= History of Palermo FC =

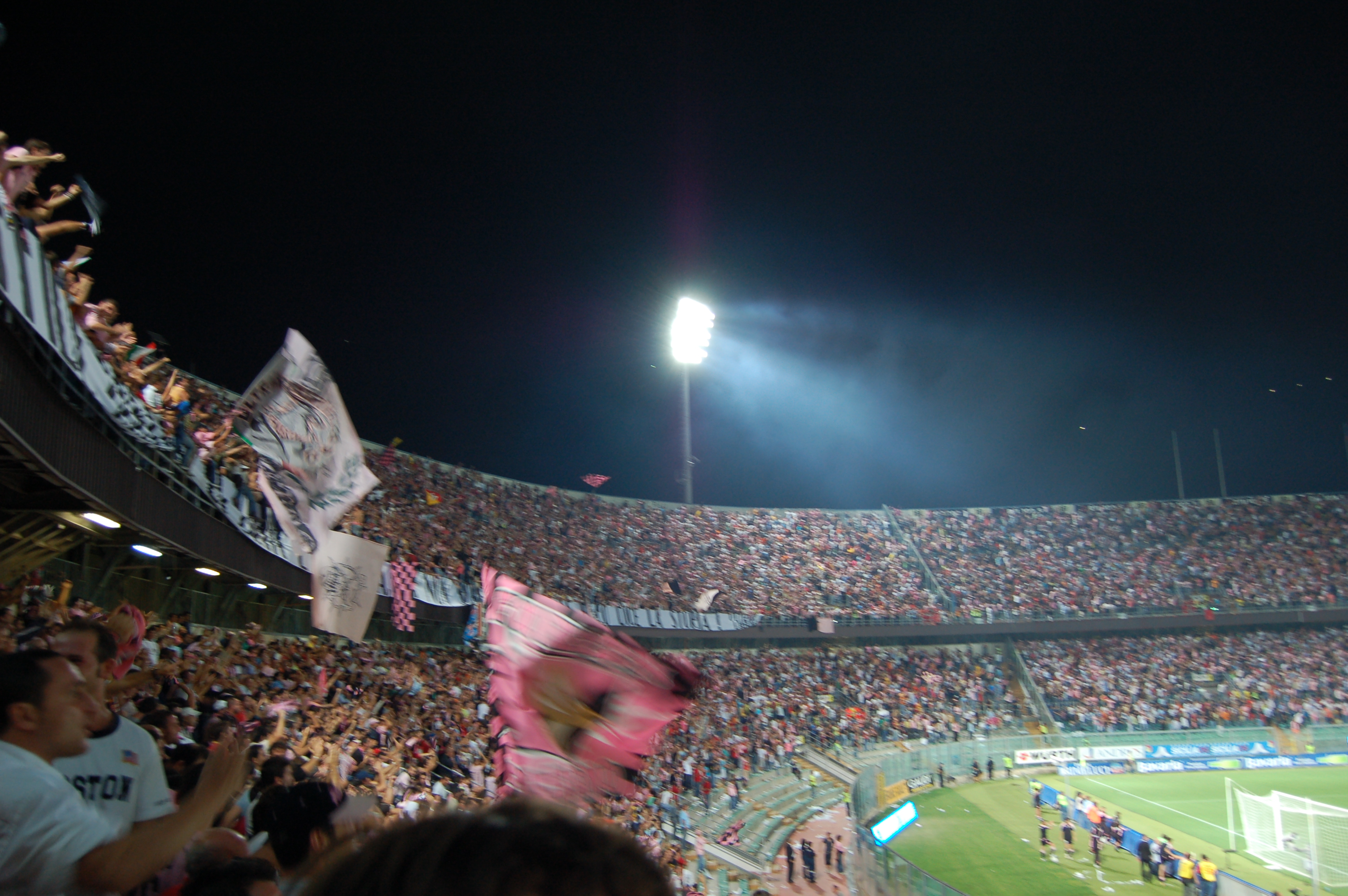
Palermo supporters in the 2006 Sicilian derby

Palermo FC, as the top association football club in Sicily in terms of Serie A appearances and among the major ones in the Italian football panorama, has a long history, which spans from its official foundation in 1900.

The club was refounded a number of times, most recently in 2019, and played in all the Italian professional leagues from Serie A to Serie C2 in different times. Its recent renaissance in the early 2000s brought the rosanero back to Serie A and later on to gain a spot in the UEFA Cup for the first time in the club history, thus giving the club a worldwide popularity. The club currently plays in Serie B, Italy's second-tier football league. They won UEFA Cup qualification for three consecutive seasons from 2004 to 2007.

== Foundation and early years (1898–1927) ==
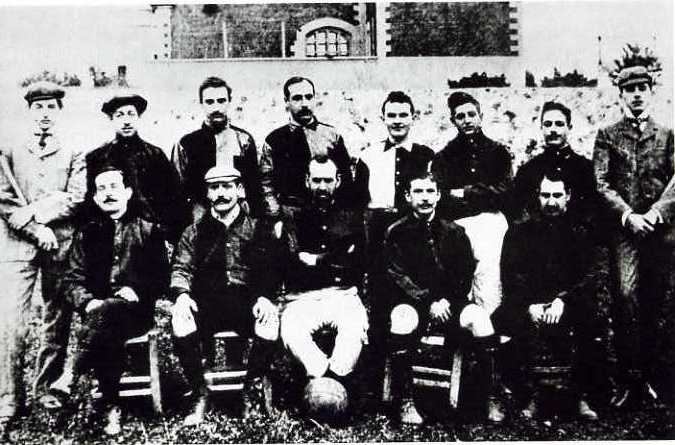
Historical first Anglo-Palermitan Athletic & Foot-Ball Club lineup, year 1900. The staff foundations of the Palermo football organization was composed of 3 Englishmen and 9 natives of Palermo, including: standing from left: De Garston, Olsen, Pirandello, Gaffiero, V. Piero, Marino, Giaconia, R. Pojero, Blake, Macaluso... Fourth person from left seated: Ignazio Majo Pagano

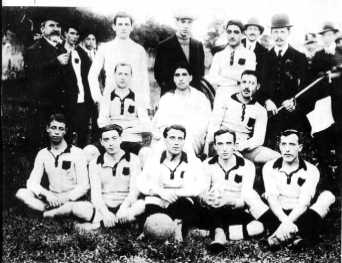
Lipton Cup winning side of 1910.

The history of the arrival of football in Palermo city is linked to the solid relationships that the high local bourgeoisie entertained with the British people. There is some debate and uncertainty about the exact date the club was founded. Some authorities believe that it may have been founded as early as 1898 due to the existence of papers addressed to Joseph Whitaker, English ornithologist in Palermo and originally believed to be first club president, about a Palermo football team founded in the month of April of that year. Conversely, another source cites that in April 1897, the future founders of Palermo Calcio founded the Sport Club. Joseph Whitaker have had an important role in the first years of the club: in 1902 he would then have been appointed honorary president, as evidenced by a letter dated 14 March of that year.

The most common and officially stated foundation date is 1 November 1900, thanks to the contribution, as well as the English community in the city, by Ignazio Majo Pagano, a young man who had known football in England and who had decided to import it in his native town. Thus was born the Anglo-Palermitan Athletic and Foot-Ball Club, which had the aim of promoting the development of the sports. Colors were chosen in red and blue, like the colors of a football t-shirt that Majo Pagano had brought with him from England. As the first president was appointed the Deputy British Console in Palermo Edward de Garston, as a trainer George Blake, coming from Genoa Cricket and Football Club. The first registered office of Sicilian Sodalizio was established at the Villa La Grua di Carini (today Villa Zito), while its first gaming land, for home-based football meetings, was made available by the Whitaker family, on their own property. However the Varvaro camp was soon nicknamed "u Pantanu" (the mire), given the bad drainage of the waters.

The Anglo-Palermitan Athletic and Foot-Ball Club played his first game on 30 December, same year, of his official foundation, on the Varvaro camp against the Nathan crew. The worldly character of the event is confirmed by the local chronicles that also remember the refreshment of the post-game. The first games in the history of the club were held all against the Team of British ships, coming from the port of Palermo: on 3 April 1901 the first meeting not solved in a defeat, against the crew of Caterina Walker.

Ignazio Majo Pagano had remained in contact with Alfredo Marangolo, a Messina's citizen who had been, for a period, his companion to the Eton College. He returned to Sicily in the early days of August 1900, once he discovered the newborn game of football, bringing with it some manuals on the rules of the game with a leather ball, shoes, a referee uniform, hats and different home. Next, on 1 December, he founded the Messina Football Club in his hometown.

The two friends would like to challenge the clubs of the respective inhabited centers. On the following 18 April 1901 this first Sicilian derby was played, completed 3-2 for the Palermo, meeting considered the first real match between Sicilian companies. Also the Messina was the protagonist of the first trip to the Palermitan team: played on 5 April 1904, the match was won 3-2 by the local team, but this match was rich in consequences, in fact the guest team contained the validity of the third and decisive goal.

To recompose the issue it was decided to play a revenge to reverse fields and to give annual cadence to the appointment. In practice, the Whitaker Challenge Cup was born, a silver trophy set up from Joshua Whitaker (also known as Joshua) and his wife Euphrosyne, among the most passionate family sports members. Of the Whitaker cup were played four editions, won, in order, two from Messina and two from Palermo. In the third edition the game was postponed by bad weather and was not immediately recovered due to the lack of an agreement on the arbitrage, then the match was held on 2 April 1907 at the Palermo house, which came out winners. After the catastrophic 1908 Messina earthquake at dawn of 28 December, the event was no longer organized.

Palermo FBC logo

In 1907, the club changed its name to Palermo Foot-Ball Club, and the team colours were changed to the current pink and black; some sources state that the club colours were changed due to an accident which happened when washing the old red and blue shirts, while others (including an official letter from the time) state that the colours are poetically intended to represent bitter and sweet.

From 1908 until the final one in 1914, Palermo also played in the Lipton Challenge Cup, not to be confused with the Sir Thomas Lipton Trophy, also organized by English businessman Sir Thomas Lipton. The competition saw them face off against Naples; Palermo won the competition three times, including a 6–0 victory in 1912. Football activity in Palermo then halted until 1918 because of the World War I.

On 16 February 1919 the club name was changed to Unione Sportiva Palermo, the club was refounded by a committee of young university students and sportsmen with barone Sergio as president, just after World War I. In 1920, Palermo competed in and won the Coppa Federale Siciliana. For the rest of the early 1920s the club competed in the Campionato Lega Sud reaching the semi-finals in 1924, before being knocked out when facing Audace Taranto, Alba Roma and Internaples.

== Early league prominence (1927–1943) ==
With the ratification of the Carta di Viareggio of 1926, the 1926–27 Prima Divisione, in which Palermo participated, became the prodromer of the current second level of the Italian football championship, being managed for the first time by the Direttorio Divisioni Superiori also for the South Italy: the Sicilians, however, played only nine football matches, because President Colombo had to withdraw the team due to financial problems, on 10 December of the same season. The first team of the city then became Vigor Palermo, that it was of the future Palermo' sport manager Totò Vilardo, who, after the championship of the 1927–28 Seconda Divisione, became the third series, the equivalent today's Serie C, changed its name to Palermo Football Club and took on the rosanero colors, making a merger with the old company on 15 July 1928. President became Conte Liotta di Lemos. On 15 August, the company is a point of a share capital of one hundred thousand lire, thanks to a subscription led by Vincenzo Florio. After three presidents in the short term of a year, the company began to be administered by Barone Bordonaro di Gebbiarossa, who resigned in 1931 to take up motor racing. The barone is responsible for the commissioning of a new coat of arms, made in the Futurist style by the Palermo painter Giuseppe "Pippo" Rizzo.

The new Palermo was admitted on 2 September at the 1928–29 Campionato Meridionale, which put a place in the new Serie B championship: the club placed third in the Sicilian sub-rig of group D, but was introduced in the next round for the FIGC resolution. Also in this phase the Palermo, arrived second, arrived made to pass from office. Arrived at the semi-finals, in the mini standings of group A, Palermo, together with Cagliari, Foggia and Lecce, played the first place for the final and, after having fought for a long time for that, came first on equal points with Lecce. It was therefore necessary to play a play-off for the final and to have the best were the Lecce players, set 1–0 in the neutral pitch of Naples. The promotion was then obtained the following year, thanks also to 15 goal striker Carlo Radice.

Palermo then got off to a great start in Serie B, almost gaining promotion during its first season with a third-place finish, only three points behind Bari. The following season it gained promotion and the Serie B championship, with Radice scoring 27 of the 50 goals for Palermo.

For its first season in Serie A, the club moved to a new stadium named Stadio Littorio (Lictorian Stadium) in the Favorita neighbourhood, today known as Stadio Renzo Barbera. The opening match was played there on 24 January 1932 against Atalanta, with Palermo winning 5–1. It took Palermo a couple of years to find its footing in the league, but by 1934–35 the club finished 7th, cementing its place as a well-established side. The next season however the club relegated to Serie B.

Down in Serie B Palermo spent three consecutive seasons finishing in 7th position. Notably for Sicilian football, the league featured all three major regional teams, Palermo, Messina and Catania; it was also the first time Palermo played against Catania on a national scale; their rivalry would then become known as the Sicilian derby.

Not considering the 1-0 Palermo win in a Reserve League match in 1929, the first official game between the two sides was played in Catania during the 1935–36 Coppa Italia, and ended in a 1–0 win for the home side. The first derby in a domestic league was featured only a few months later, on 1 November 1936 at the Stadio Littorio and ended in a 1–1 tie, with Catania being supported by only eight people attending the match; Palermo got the better of Catania later in the season though, with a 1–0 victory.

In 1936 the fascist regime forced Palermo to change its colours to yellow and red, after the official ones of the local municipality. Meanwhile, economical troubles arose: causing even the imposition of a 10 lire meat tax in an attempt to finance the club. However Palermo's fourth season for back down in the league was a troublesome one, as in 1940 it was expelled by the Italian Football Federation because of financial problems. A merger with Unione Sportiva Juventina Palermo brought to the foundation of Unione Sportiva Palermo-Juventina, which entered Serie C in 1941 and played with light blue colours. In 1942 the club returned to Serie B and switched back to its original colours. In 1943, however, chairman Beppe Agnello was forced to retire the club from the league following the World War II events.

== Post-War Palermo (1946–1970) ==
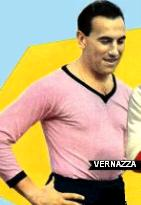
Palermo goalscorer, Santiago Vernazza.

After having won the war Sicilian championship, the Palermo, as a Serie B company, was invited to play in the south-central round of the 1945–46 Divisione Nazionale, the first and last non-single group championship since 1929. In the meantime each reference to Juventina had fallen and the denomination was once again Unione Sportiva Palermo. Re-admitted to the category of belonging, in the 1947–48 season Palermo won the girone C of the Serie B championship and obtained the promotion: in that team they played players like the Czechoslovak Čestmír Vycpálek and the Italians Gaetano Conti, Carmelo Di Bella and Aurelio Pavesi De Marco. The president was Stefano La Motta, who at the beginning of the season, after taking office on 1 July 1947, had declared: "I will be President for a season, the time to bring Palermo back to Serie A". He was speaking and the helm of the society passed to Giuseppe Guzzardella, although the main financier was Prince Raimondo Lanza di Trabia, who a few years later became the president himself. Meanwhile, Palermo finished 11th the following season in Serie A, thanks to several good performances, such as a vamp of two goals against Grande Torino. The prince brought several valuable players to Palermo such as Helge Bronée or Şükrü Gülesin and emerging coaches such as Giuseppe Viani. In 1951–52 the rosanero fought long for first place, but a final drop brought them back to 11th position. The rosanero stayed six consecutive seasons in the top flight and the relegation of 1953–54 came only after the playoffs salvation against SPAL and Udinese.

The relegation was followed by a phase of profound reorganization, which involved all levels: the season of political presidents was inaugurated with Mario Fasino. Among the many new players purchased, Enzo Benedetti also arrived, who will become the captain of the Palermo team from 1955, after his first landing in Sicily, to 1962. In the following years, Palermo became a team that alternated Serie A promotions with relegations in Serie B (Club Yo-yo). One of the symbol players of this period was the former River Plate striker Santiago Vernazza, a fans' idol thanks to 54 goals in 121 total games which also make him the third in the all-time scorer list of Palermo. In the summer of 1960, Palermo participated for the first time in international competitions: in June at its first and last Cup of the Alps, in July at the first of two Mitropa Cups.

The Palermo at the time succeeded in enhancing several players destined for a good career, such as Tarcisio Burgnich or goalkeeper Roberto Anzolin who was then sold to Juventus The good corporate relationship with the Turin club is also witnessed by the passages of other players such as Giuseppe Furino, Carlo Mattrel and Franco Causio. The peak under the sporting profile arrived in the 1961–62 Serie A, when the rosanero reached the 8th place, gaining prestigious results, such as a historic 2–4 away victory against Juve in Turin, on 18 February 1962. In the same year the first Sicilian derbies were played in the top flight with Catania. The following edition Palermo failed to repeat and relegated to Serie B. In those years there were Casimiro Vizzini president and Totò Vilardo sports manager: Vilardo, the company's all-round secretary, was nicknamed The football wizard. At the end of the 1962–63 season Vilardo was disqualified for life for an illegal attempt: he asked to the referee Concetto Lo Bello the Bari's win on the last day of the Serie B championship, so that once the Apulian freshman was promoted would be bought the player José Ferdinando Puglia, healing the coffers of the rosanero company.

In 1968, with the transformation of the football club into a joint-stock company, Palermo changed its name to Società Sportiva Calcio Palermo and moreover, in that year, the team returned in Serie A in the 1967–68 Serie B, with the former player and coach Carmelo Di Bella. In December of the new season, Palermo took part in its second and last Mitropa Cup and, therefore, in its third and last participation in a European competition. The following international experience will be lived 37 years later, in 2005 (UEFA Cup).

== Mixed times (1970–2001) ==
Renzo Barbera took over the club on 4 May 1970, becoming the new chairman; he would go on to be remembered as one of the greatest chairmen in the club's history. After 1973, Palermo played exclusively in Serie B for a long period time. Despite their lower league status, Palermo were still able to garner some success in the cup this period, reaching the Italian Cup final in 1974, against Bologna, Palermo lost on penalty shoot-outs after a 1–1 tie, with the Bologna goal, a penalty, scored during injury time in the second half.

The club's second Coppa Italia final, under coach Fernando Veneranda, was reached in 1979; the game was lost 2–1 to Juventus after extra time, with the equaliser goal for the opponents curiously scored again during injury time, as happened five years before.

On 7 March 1980 Barbera sold the club to constructor Gaspare Gambino, following a five-points deduction imposed by the Italian Football Federation due to a match fixing scandal which involved Palermo midfielder Guido Magherini, then disqualified for 3 years and a half. In 1984 Palermo relegated to Serie C1 for the first time in its history, but promptly returned to Serie B one year later. The 1985–86 season which ended in the summer was however the last for Palermo, as the club, after a struggling saving from relegation, was expelled by the federation because of financial problems. the summer of 1987, after a year without professional football in Palermo, the club was refounded, bearing the name Unione Sportiva Città di Palermo, and began to play down from Serie C2, which was promptly won.

A return to Serie B occurred in 1991, but lasted only a year. Palermo won the Serie C1 championship in 1993: that season, the league featured numerous other Sicilian clubs including Messina, Catania, Giarre, Siracusa and Acireale, with the latter promoted to Serie B together with Palermo. The rosanero stayed back up in Serie B for four seasons, and in 1994 wrote a piece of history for themselves with a 1–0 away win against Milan in the Coppa Italia second round.

In the 1990s, the 1995–96 season was the highlight for Palermo, obtaining a seventh place after having fought hard for promotion, and even appearing in the quarter-finals of the Coppa Italia after eliminating Parma and Vicenza among others, with a team mostly composed of Palermitan footballers and coached by Palermo-born Ignazio Arcoleo.

However, the following season ended with relegation to Serie C1. In 1997 Palermo played one of the worst season in its history, as they were due to be relegated to the Serie C2 division after a dramatic and shocking defeat in a play-off against Battipagliese; however Palermo was later saved by the Italian Football Federation due to the expulsion of Ischia Isolaverde, another Serie C1 team.

AS Roma chairman Franco Sensi bought the team on 3 March 2000, but the Palermo, in 1999–2000, missed a spot in the promotion playoffs. However, Palermo won group B of 2000–01 Serie C1 and got promoted to Serie B the next year, after a hard fight against fellow islanders Messina, reached at the top of the table just at the last match-day.

== Back in Serie A (2001–2005) ==
In the summer of 2002, after a quiet Serie B season ended in mid-table place, Palermo was sold by Sensi to retail trade entrepreneur Maurizio Zamparini in a 15 million euro bid. The former Venezia owner brought in various players, including several ones from his past club, such as Mario Santana, Kewullay Conteh, Stefano Morrone and Arturo Di Napoli.

The 2002–03 season was the first of the Zamparini era: the club went through two managers that season, Ezio Glerean and Daniele Arrigoni, the former being fired only after the first league matchday, a 4–2 loss to Ancona, before arriving at Nedo Sonetti, who managed to help Palermo climb the league table. However, Palermo missed out on promotion to Serie A on the final day of the season, after a 3–0 away defeat to Lecce, who obtained the last promotion place. Palermo ended in fifth place, and Sonetti was replaced by Empoli coach Silvio Baldini for the upcoming 2003–04 campaign.

Zamparini was ambitious and reinforced the team with top signings such as Luca Toni, Lamberto Zauli and Eugenio Corini, and promising youngsters Simone Pepe, Andrea Gasbarroni and Christian Terlizzi. However, Baldini was fired in January 2004, after a shocking home defeat to Salernitana followed by public attacks from the head coach directed to the team chairman. Palermo, in third place at the time and reinforced still further with signings of Fabio Grosso, Antonio and Emanuele Filippini, replaced Baldini with Francesco Guidolin. The rosanero ended its season winning the Serie B title season on goal difference over Cagliari, with Luca Toni finishing the league top-scorer by some distance, with 30 goals in 45 matches.

The 2004–05 season was the first back in Serie A for the Palermo club since 1973. The event was well welcomed by the team supporters, as the club managed to sell all the 33,000 home stadium seats reserved to local fans as season tickets. Palermo ended the season with an excellent sixth place, allowing it to qualify for the 2005–06 UEFA Cup for the first time in its history. Luca Toni broke the Palermo's Serie A scoring record by notching up 20 league goals.

== European years (2005–2013) ==
After two successful seasons in Sicily, Francesco Guidolin resigned as coach and Luigi Delneri was appointed to replace him for the 2005–06 season, the first in a European competition in Palermo's history. During the summer football market, Luca Toni was sold to Fiorentina for €10 millions and a couple of young internationals, Andrea Caracciolo and Stephen Makinwa, were signed to replace him. The team had a good start in the new season, most notably with an exciting 3–2 win against Inter Milan and a successful UEFA Cup debut against Anorthosis Famagusta, defeated 6–1 on aggregate (2–1 and 4–0). Palermo successively won the group stage, finishing above Espanyol, Lokomotiv Moscow, Maccabi Petah Tikva and Brøndby.

Despite good European form, Palermo was not able to keep up its form in the league; Delneri was consequently fired in January 2006 following a 2–1 home defeat to Siena and Giuseppe Papadopulo was appointed to replace him. He made his debut at the helm of Palermo with a sensational 3–0 win to Milan in the Coppa Italia quarter-final return leg, taking Palermo through to the semi-final round for the third time in its history; they eventually went out to Roma on away goals rule, the score being 2–2 on aggregate. Palermo was also eliminated from European by Schalke in a 3-1 aggregate loss, after having defeated Slavia Prague in the round of 32. Palermo ended the season in eighth place, and thus was expected to play the 2006 UEFA Intertoto Cup. However, due to the Calciopoli, the FIGC stated they would not enter Palermo into the Intertoto Cup. In the meanwhile, Francesco Guidolin left Monaco to re-join Palermo at Papadopulo's place.

After the verdicts penalized numerous clubs, Palermo's overall position for that season was elevated to fifth, meaning they had qualified for the 2006–07 UEFA Cup. In the transfer window, Palermo spent millions adding players to their squad, including Aimo Diana, Mark Bresciano, Fábio Simplício and Amauri, but sold World Cup winner Fabio Grosso to Inter Milan. The events led several football pundits to tip Palermo to do well in the season ahead. A very exciting start saw Palermo sitting on top of the Serie A table in September 2006 after beating Catania 5–3 at home in the Sicilian derby. Another notable victory was a 2–0 away win to Milan at San Siro stadium. The team started well also in the UEFA Cup by knocking out West Ham United. However, this time around the group stage proved to be more difficult than the previous year, and Palermo finished last in a group that contained Celta de Vigo, Eintracht Frankfurt, Fenerbahçe and Newcastle United.

On 2 February 2007 Palermo was involved in a controversial away Sicilian derby, suspended for 30 minutes during the second half and followed by violence outside the Catania stadium in which policeman Filippo Raciti was killed by a small explosive launched by a Catania hooligan. This was followed by a two-weeks stop to all football leagues and national team matches in the whole country. Successively to these events Palermo, then clearly third-placed, did not manage to achieve a single victory, and dropped down to sixth position in the Serie A. Club chairman Maurizio Zamparini became more critical of Guidolin and finally sacked him on 23 April 2007 following a 3–4 home defeat to third-last placed Parma which extended the run of poor results to 11 games without a single win. Assistant coach Renzo Gobbo and youth team coach Rosario Pergolizzi, appointed as caretaker coaches at Guidolin's place, led the team for two matches, a 2–1 away win at Livorno in their debut which ended the negative run and two further defeats, including an upset 3–2 away loss against last-placed team Ascoli, already relegated to Serie B at the time, which left the rosanero in seventh place, the last UEFA Cup spot, only three points above Atalanta. The events led Zamparini to revoke Guidolin's dismissal and call him back for the remaining two matches. Guidolin's return brought two victories, to Siena and Udinese, ending the season in fifth place, obtaining thus qualification to the 2007–08 UEFA Cup for the third consecutive time and breaking its previous record of 53 points of two years before. On 31 May 2007 Palermo chairman Maurizio Zamparini announced Stefano Colantuono as new rosanero coach for the 2007–08 season. The first two signings for the new season, midfielder Giulio Migliaccio from Atalanta and goalkeeper Samir Ujkani from Anderlecht, were announced on 8 June. Contemporarily, team captain Eugenio Corini, whose contract was due to expire within a few days, announced he was going to leave Palermo. Palermo's moves in the summer market included notable signings such as Boško Janković and Fabrizio Miccoli to replace Andrea Caracciolo and David Di Michele, sold to Sampdoria and Torino respectively. A fairly unimpressive start in the season, including a shock UEFA Cup elimination against Czech minnows Mladá Boleslav, however convinced Zamparini to sack Colantuono after a crush 5–0 loss to Juventus, re-calling Guidolin at the helm of the rosanero. Guidolin's fourth spell as Palermo boss proved to be even more unsuccessful, as Palermo struggled in the league, falling down to thirteenth place with concerns of being unexpectedly involved in the relegation battle. A 3–2 home loss to Genoa, the third in a row for Palermo, followed by Guidolin's controversial attacks against the supporting fanbase and the club management, brought in to Colantuono being reinstated as rosanero boss on 24 March 2008.

Colantuono was confirmed as Palermo boss for the 2008–09 season. During the summer transfer market, club stars like Amauri, Andrea Barzagli and Cristian Zaccardo were sold. New signings included former and current Italian internationals Marco Amelia, Fabio Liverani and Antonio Nocerino. The Rosanero started their season with a disappointing 2–1 home loss to Lega Pro Prima Divisione side Ravenna in the Third Round of the Coppa Italia. After just one game from the new campaign, a 3–1 loss to Udinese, Zamparini sacked Colantuono, and the head coach role was given to Davide Ballardini. With Ballardini as head coach, Palermo ended the season with a respectable eighth place, and also won its first Campionato Nazionale Primavera national title, under the guidance of youth coach Rosario Pergolizzi. After the end of the season, Palermo dismissed Ballardini from the coaching post following disagreements with the board, and replaced him with Walter Zenga, whose appointment from Sicilian arch-rivals Catania was greeted with surprise and dismay from supporters of both parties. Zenga's reign, however, lasted only 13 games, as he was dismissed on 23 November 2009 due to poor performances, ironically after a 1–1 home tie to Sicilian rivals and Zenga's former team, Catania, with former Lazio boss Delio Rossi being appointed at his place. Under the tutelage of Delio Rossi, results dramatically improved, and Palermo established a record of seven consecutive home wins, and also achieved prestigious results such as two 2–0 wins against Italian giants Milan and Juventus. The latter win, achieved on February, led Palermo to climb over the Bianconeri in fourth place, establishing the Rosanero as serious contenders for a Champions League spot, which they ultimately lost to Sampdoria by only one point. Such season also launched new emerging stars such as midfielder Javier Pastore and goalkeeper Salvatore Sirigu, who went on to become integral part of their respective international teams.

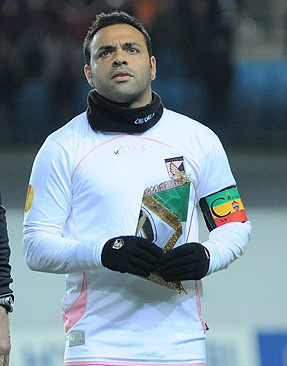
Former club captain Fabrizio Miccoli

The new season started with Delio Rossi still in charge of the club: Simon Kjær and Edinson Cavani left the club, and a few more promising youngsters were signed (most notably Argentine Ezequiel Muñoz and the Slovene duo of Armin Bačinović and Josip Iličić), plus more experienced acquisitions such as forwards Massimo Maccarone and Mauricio Pinilla. The 2010–11 season also marked Palermo's return into continental football in the form of the UEFA Europa League. Palermo reached their third Coppa Italia finals after defeating Milan 4–3 on aggregate on 10 May 2011, losing 3–1 to Inter Milan in the final. For the 2011–12 season, Delio Rossi was replaced by former Chievo boss Stefano Pioli, who was, however, sacked before the Serie A kickoff after being eliminated by Swiss minnows Thun in the UEFA Europa League third preliminary round. In a somewhat surprise move, Pioli was replaced by under-19 team coach Devis Mangia, with no managerial experience other than at youth team and minor league level; despite that, Mangia turned Palermo fortunes by leading the Rosanero in fifth place thanks to an impressive string of six consecutive home wins, thus deserving a long-term deal at the club. A string of poor results, however, led Palermo to three consecutive defeats, including elimination from the Coppa Italia and a disappointing loss in the Sicilian derby, persuading Zamparini to replace Mangia with the more experienced Bortolo Mutti. Palermo arrived 16th in that season.

== Zamparini's later years and Serie B return (2013–2018) ==
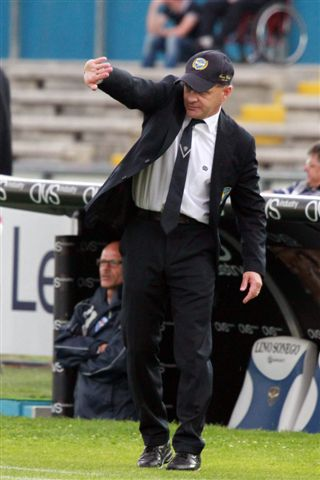
Giuseppe Iachini, formerly a Palermo midfielder in the 1990s, replaced Gattuso as head coach during the 2013–14 season and led the club to a Serie B champions title and broke the highest-Serie-B-point record.

For the 2012–13 season, Zamparini came with another staff revolution, appointing Giorgio Perinetti as the new director of football and Giuseppe Sannino as the manager, both coming from Siena. Significant sales included Federico Balzaretti and Giulio Migliaccio, who left the Rosanero as part of a complete restructuring. The season started in unfashionable manner, leading to the sacking of Sannino and his replacement with Gian Piero Gasperini; days later, Perinetti resigned and Pietro Lo Monaco was named as the new club managing director. Results did not improve, however, and Palermo descended into the relegation zone; a controversial handling of the January transfer window and even more negative results led to Gasparini being sacked for Alberto Malesani, and called back after three games, the return of Perinetti in place for Lo Monaco, and ultimately a second dismissal for Gasperini who was replaced by a re-hired Sannino. Despite a slight increase in results, Palermo ended its season in 18th place, being thus relegated to Serie B after nine consecutive seasons in the top flight.

For the new Serie B campaign, Zamparini appointed former Milan and Italy international star Gennaro Gattuso as the new manager, despite him having little prior managerial experience; he was sacked in September 2013, the 28th sacked manager in 11 years. Fortune was reversed rather rapidly, however, as Palermo regained promotion back to Serie A for the 2014–15 season thanks to a 1–0 victory over Novara on 3 May 2014 under the guidance of Giuseppe Iachini, who took the reins over after Gattuso was sacked due to poor results, with the Rosanero responding with a record-breaking Serie B season ended with 86 points, one more than previous record holders Juventus, Chievo and Sassuolo (all of them in the 22-team Serie B format).

Due to his successful results, Palermo confirmed Iachini as head coach for the 2014–15 Serie A season, and agreed a contract extension until June 2016 with him. A new director of football, Franco Ceravolo (formerly a scout for Juventus), was instead named in place of Perinetti, but was removed (with Iachini being instead confirmed) after a dismal season start led Zamparini to intervene in order to turn the team's fortunes. The non-playing staff changes at Palermo turned out to be ultimately successful, with Palermo winning many games afterwards and entering the fight for a UEFA Europa League spot thanks to the all-Argentine striking force of Paulo Dybala and Franco Vázquez.

In 2015–16 season, Palermo started their season without Dybala after the youngster moved to Juventus; the Rosanero therefore relied on senior striker Alberto Gilardino to play as a partner of Vázquez. On 10 November 2015, coach Giuseppe Iachini was sacked due to disappointing results in the beginning of the season; he was replaced by Davide Ballardini. Ballardini only lasted for 7 matches with Palermo before fired by Zamparini after spectacularly falling out with Palermo's players. Palermo captain Stefano Sorrentino reported that during 1–0 victory against Hellas Verona, the coach did not speak to Palermo players neither before nor after the match. Fabio Viviani became Palermo's caretaker manager in a 0–4 defeat against Genoa. Rosanero hired Guillermo Barros Schelotto as a new manager. Schelotto, however, did not have the necessary paperwork to be registered as Palermo coach, so his position was taken by Primavera youth team coach Giovanni Bosi during a 4–1 win over Udinese. Schelotto was registered as a team manager during that match. Giovanni Tedesco named as Palermo's sixth coach of the season while Schelotto is still waiting for the paperwork. On 10 February 2016, following Schelotto's resignation after UEFA refusal to hand him a valid European coaching authorization, Palermo announced to have promoted Primavera youth coach Giovanni Bosi as new head coach, with Tedesco as his technical collaborator. Five days later, Bosi was sacked, and Iachini was re-appointed as manager. On 10 March, Iachini was sacked once again, as Walter Novellino was appointed as his replacement. Novellino was then sacked on 11 April. Davide Ballardini was rehired a day later for the ninth managerial change that season. On 15 May, Palermo escaped relegation on the last day of the league with the necessary win over Hellas Verona 3–2, securing 16th place.

For the 2016–17 season, Zamparini re-appointed Rino Foschi as director of football; he however resigned after just a month in charge and was replaced by former Trapani director Daniele Faggiano. Most senior players such as Gilardino, Sorrentino, Vázquez and Maresca were sold and mostly replaced with Alessandro Diamanti plus a number of young and quasi-unknown foreign players. Ballardini, who was originally confirmed as head coach, left his position after a draw at Inter Milan at the second matchday of the season and was replaced with Serie A newbie Roberto De Zerbi. De Zerbi's stint as Palermo head coach ended in dismal as he was sacked following Coppa Italia elimination at home against Serie B team Spezia, and after seven league losses in a row, with former club captain Eugenio Corini taking over. This was followed by Faggiano's resignations; his role was not filled as Zamparini announced his intention to operate in the January 2017 transfer market with the support of a number of consultants of his, mostly Gianni Di Marzio, football agent Davor Ćurković and Dario Šimić (who was successively officially announced as part of the club non-coaching staff). After two more defeats against relegation battle opponents Empoli and Sassuolo, no major signing in the first half of January and eight points deep into relegation zone, Zamparini however decided to change his mind by appointing Nicola Salerno as new director of football.

On 27 February 2017, Zamparini stepped down as chairman of Palermo after 15 years in charge, announcing he had agreed in principle to sell his controlling stake to an unspecified Anglo-American fund, led by Italian-American Paul Baccaglini who was named new club president on 6 March.

Palermo ended the season in 19th place, being relegated to Serie B. The takeover, originally scheduled to be finalized by 30 April 2017 and then delayed by 30 June, eventually collapsed after Zamparini, who in the meantime had appointed Bruno Tedino as new head coach for the 2017–18 Serie B campaign, rejected the final offer he received from Baccaglini. On 4 July 2017, Baccaglini resigned as Palermo chairmen, falling back into the hands of Zamparini, after the necessary funds were not in place.

Palermo's campaign in the 2017–18 Serie B aimed to an immediate promotion to the top flight, with Bruno Tedino as head coach and Fabio Lupo as director of football. The Rosanero ended the first half of the season in first place; however, a streak of negative results and disagreements between Lupo and Zamparini led to the former's dismissal and replacement with Aladino Valoti. As results did not improve, Tedino was ultimately dismissed as well and replaced by Roberto Stellone, who however failed on winning promotion, ending the regular season in fourth place and eventually losing the playoff finals to Frosinone. The club also experienced a number of administrative issues which led to Zamparini appointing Giovanni Giammarva, an administrative expert from Palermo, as new president.

== New ownerships, financial issues and Serie B exclusion (2018–2019) ==
For the 2018–19 Serie B season, Palermo found themselves forced to sell a number of players due to financial issues, with Antonino La Gumina sold to Empoli for a reported fee of €9m and Igor Coronado to Sharjah for €6m. With Tedino reappointed as head coach, Zamparini also decided to rehire Rino Foschi as director of football for a third time, and Giammarva resigning from his chairman post on 8 August 2018. On 26 September 2018, Tedino was sacked for a second time, and again replaced by Stellone. On 24 October 2018, Raffaello Follieri's attempt to buy the club from Zamparini's hands collapsed.

On 22 November 2018, the club formally confirmed a takeover agreement between Zamparini and an undisclosed investor. On 1 December, Zamparini confirmed the sale of the club to an unnamed London company for the "symbolic" price of €10 (£8.75). The takeover by Sport Capital Group Investments Ltd. was officially formalized on 29 December 2018, with English businessman Clive Richardson, head of the new group, being named as new club chairman. In January 2019, the parent company, Sport Capital Group Investments was acquired by a listed company of NEX Exchange: Sport Capital Group plc, for a nominal fee.

Following a January 2019 transfer session with no signings at all and tensions within the board, on 4 February 2019 Clive Richardson (chairman) and John Treacy (director) left the club with immediate effect. On 14 February 2019, Sport Capital Group plc, the ultimate owner of the club, sold the parent company of the club, Palermo F.C. S.p.A., as well as the club itself and other subsidiaries, such as Mepal S.r.l., to a consortium that led by Daniela De Angeli and other managers of the club, for a nominal fee. De Angeli was also appointed as the club's managing director, while Rino Foschi became the club chairman on top of his position as the director of sport. It was also announced that they would found new investors for the club. On 3 May 2019, it was announced that Sporting Network S.r.l., controlled by travel business company Arkus Network, had purchased Palermo F.C. S.p.A. as well as its subsidiaries U.S. Città di Palermo and Mepal S.r.l. On the same day Alessandro Albanese became the new chairman of the club, while Roberto Bergamo became the new CEO; Rino Foschi was also re-appointed as the director of sport. The new owner Sporting Network S.r.l. subscribed a €5 million capital increase of the club.

By the end of the 2018–19 Serie B, Palermo were originally the third-placed team with 63 points, but were placed at the bottom of the league table by the FIGC on 13 May, due to financial irregularities, relegating them to Serie C. According to the press release of FIGC, under the Zamparini's ownership, the club had sold Mepal S.r.l., an investment vehicle that owns the image rights of the club, to a Luxembourger company that controlled by Zamparini, and then the club leased back the image rights for a nominal fee. On 29 May 2019, Palermo partially won on appeal against their relegation to Serie C, being docked 20 points for financial irregularities, therefore remaining in Serie B.

On 24 June 2019, Palermo was reported to have failed to correctly submit its application to participate in the 2019–20 Serie B season, by failing to provide a valid insurance policy for the new year; in case of the application being rejected, the club would be excluded from Italian football and be possibly replaced by a phoenix club which would be forced to restart from Serie D, with all of its players and staff members being released automatically. The club was formally excluded from Serie B on 12 July 2019.

== A new club (2019–present) ==
On 23 July 2019, in compliance of Article 52 of NOIF, Mayor of Palermo Leoluca Orlando confirmed six declarations of interests had been presented for a new phoenix club to be admitted in Serie D for the 2019–20 season. The next day, Orlando announced to have chosen "Hera Hora srl", owned by entrepreneurs Dario Mirri (Palermo native, and Renzo Barbera's nephew) and Sicilian-American Tony DiPiazza, as the new owners.

The new club, named Società Sportiva Dilettantistica Palermo, started with Rosario Pergolizzi (a former Palermo youth coach) as their first manager, and managed to keep Andrea Accardi from the previous Serie B campaign, as well as signing former Serie A and Palermo star Mario Santana. Palermo completed their Serie D campaign in first place, and was awarded promotion to Serie C by the Italian Football Federation after all the amateur leagues were stopped in March 2020 due to the global COVID-19 pandemic. On 16 July 2020, the club changed its name to Palermo Football Club.

== Bibliography ==
- Prestigiacomo, Vincenzo; Bagnati, Giuseppe; Maggio, Vito (2001). Il Palermo: una storia di cento anni (in Italian). Palermo: Corrado Rappa. p. 232.
- Prestigiacomo, Vincenzo; Bagnati, Giuseppe; Maggio, Vito (2004). Il Palermo racconta: storie, confessioni e leggende rosanero (in Italian). Palermo: Grafill. p. 253. ISBN 88-8207-144-8.
- Giordano, Giovanni; Brandaleone, Carlo (1982). Calcio Palermo: gli ottantaquattro anni di storia della societa rosanero (in Italian). Palermo: Giada. p. 432. ISBN 88-8207-144-8.
- Ginex, Roberto; Gueli, Roberto (1996). Breve storia del grande Palermo (in Italian). Rome: Newton. p. 66. ISBN 88-8183-361-1.
