= 2005–06 US Città di Palermo season =

U.S. Città di Palermo
2005–06 season
- Chairman: Maurizio Zamparini
- Manager: Luigi Delneri (Days 1-22); Giuseppe Papadopulo (Days 23-38)
- Serie A: 5th (UEFA Cup)
- UEFA Cup: Round of 16
- Coppa Italia: Semi-finals
- Top goalscorer: League: David Di Michele (10); All: Andrea Caracciolo (11)
- Highest home attendance: 33,149 (vs Juventus – January 7, 2006)
- Lowest home attendance: 1,470 (vs Bari – January 10, 2006)

U.S. Città di Palermo played the season 2005-06 in the Serie A league, the second consecutive time since the 2004 promotion. During this season, Palermo also competed in the UEFA Cup, thus making its historical first appearance in a European competition.

== Review and events ==
After having ended the 2004-05 Serie A campaign in sixth place, Palermo automatically qualified to the next UEFA Cup for an historical first time. Meanwhile, Francesco Guidolin resigned following the last matchday and Luigi Delneri was appointed to replace him. The summer market was heavily conditioned by the sale of powerful striker Luca Toni to Fiorentina for €10mln in a highly controversial move. Two young strikers, Andrea Caracciolo from Brescia and Stephen Makinwa from Atalanta, were signed as potential replacements for Toni.

Palermo had a good start in the season, showing a spectacular style of playing with impressive results, with an exciting 3-2 home win against Inter Milan as the highest point of the first half of the season. Palermo also successfully passed to the UEFA Cup group stage, after having defeated Cypriot side Anorthosis Famagusta FC in a 6-1 aggregate win. The club also succeeded to win its UEFA Cup round against the likes of RCD Espanyol, FC Lokomotiv Moscow, Maccabi Petah Tikva F.C. and Brøndby IF.

However, the initial successes were not repeated at the domestic one, as the team gradually lost touch with the top sides of the Serie A table. Despite intensive activity during the January football market, which brought David Di Michele, Federico Agliardi, Cristiano Lupatelli and Denis Godeas to the club, Palermo continued not to win matches, and a 3-1 home loss against Siena convinced Maurizio Zamparini to sack Delneri and replace him with Giuseppe Papadopulo. The new Palermo boss made an astonishing debut in a 3-0 home win to AC Milan in the quarter-finals of Coppa Italia, thus overturning the 1-0 defeat in the first leg and qualifying to the semi-finals of Coppa Italia with AS Roma as its opponent.

In the meanwhile Palermo also qualified to the UEFA Cup round of 16 after having defeated SK Slavia Praha. In the round of 16, Palermo challenged FC Schalke 04: a 1-0 home win in the first leg, with a goal by Franco Brienza, was followed by a 3-0 loss at Gelsenkirchen, with Palermo playing the whole second half in 10 players after team captain Eugenio Corini was sent off. Just six days after the UEFA Cup loss, Palermo won the first leg of the Coppa Italia semifinal over AS Roma by 2-1. The return match, played at the Stadio Olimpico of Rome on April 12, ended in a 1-0 win for AS Roma which eliminated the rosanero.

Palermo ended the season in eighth place, being initially qualified for the UEFA Intertoto Cup 2006. However, following the 2006 Serie A scandal, the team was admitted to play UEFA Cup for the next season.

== Match results ==
=== Serie A ===
Pos	Team	Pld	W	D	L	GF	GA	GD	Pts	Qualification or relegation
3	Milan (Note: Milan, Fiorentina and Lazio were docked 30 points, all for involvement in the Calciopoli.)	38	28	4	6	85	31	+54	58	Qualification to Champions League third qualifying round
4	Chievo	38	13	15	10	54	49	+5	54	Qualification to Champions League third qualifying round
5	Palermo	38	13	13	12	50	52	−2	52	Qualification to UEFA Cup first round
6	Livorno	38	12	13	13	37	44	−7	49	Qualification to UEFA Cup first round
7	Parma (Note: Parma gained entry to the 2006–07 UEFA Cup because 2005–06 Coppa Italia finalists Inter and Roma qualified to the 2006–07 UEFA Champions League and 2006–07 UEFA Cup through their respective championship positions. The final positions of Parma and Empoli were decided by head-to-head record.)	38	12	9	17	46	60	−14	45	Qualification to UEFA Cup first round

Source: 2005–06 Serie A, Soccerway
Rules for classification: 1) points; 2) goal difference; 3) number of goals scored.
Notes:

Legend
Win	Draw	Loss

Date and time	Opponent	Venue	Result	Scorers	Attendance
August 28, 2005 – 15.00	Parma	Away	Drew 1-1	Terlizzi	12,733
September 10, 2005 – 18.00	Inter	Home	Won 3-2	Corini, Terlizzi, Makinwa	31,309
September 18, 2005 – 15.00	Siena	Away	Won 2-1	Terlizzi, Makinwa	7,492
September 21, 2005 – 20.30	Reggina	Home	Won 1-0	Terlizzi	28,145
September 25, 2005 – 15.00	Lazio	Away	Lost 2-4	Caracciolo, González	23,935
October 2, 2005 – 15.00	Empoli	Home	Drew 2-2	Caracciolo, Makinwa	26,642
October 16, 2005 – 15.00	Chievo	Home	Drew 2-2	Corini, Caracciolo	27,092
October 23, 2005 – 15.00	AC Milan	Away	Lost 1-2	Caracciolo	63,115
October 26, 2005 – 20.30	Lecce	Home	Won 3-0	Bonanni, Mutarelli, Ferri	27,084
October 30, 2005 – 20.30	Udinese	Away	Drew 0-0		16,561
November 6, 2005 – 20.30	Sampdoria	Home	Lost 0-2		29,087
November 20, 2005 – 15.00	Treviso	Away	Drew 2-2	Ferri, Brienza	5,540
November 27, 2005 – 15.00	Ascoli	Away	Drew 1-1	Bonanni	9,790
December 4, 2005 – 15.00	Cagliari	Home	Drew 2-2	Caracciolo, Makinwa	26,209
December 11, 2005 – 15.00	AS Roma	Away	Won 2-1	Biava, Caracciolo	35,316
December 18, 2005 – 15.00	Livorno	Home	Lost 0-2		26,151
December 21, 2005 – 20.30	Fiorentina	Away	Lost 0-1		29,487
January 7, 2006 – 20.30	Juventus	Home	Lost 1-2	Terlizzi	33,149
January 14, 2006 – 20.30	Messina	Away	Drew 0-0		20,233
January 18, 2006 – 20.30	Parma	Home	Won 4-2	Corini, Barzagli, Di Michele (2)	26,990
January 21, 2006 – 20.30	Inter	Away	Lost 0-3		48,942
January 28, 2006 – 18.00	Siena	Home	Lost 1-3	Godeas	26,428
February 5, 2006 – 15.00	Reggina	Away	Drew 2-2	Barone, Caracciolo	13,683
February 8, 2006 – 20.30	Lazio	Home	Won 3-1	González, Tedesco, Caracciolo	27,074
February 12, 2006 – 15.00	Empoli	Away	Won 1-0	Barzagli	5,379
February 19, 2006 – 15.00	Chievo	Away	Drew 0-0		5,580
February 26, 2006 – 15.00	AC Milan	Home	Lost 0-2		31,868
March 5, 2006 – 15.00	Lecce	Away	Lost 0-2		10,890
March 12, 2006 – 15.00	Udinese	Home	Won 2-0	Di Michele, Tedesco	25,792
March 19, 2006 – 15.00	Sampdoria	Away	Won 2-0	Mutarelli, Di Michele	21,073
March 26, 2006 – 15.00	Treviso	Home	Won 1-0	Makinwa	26,025
April 2, 2006 – 15.00	Ascoli	Home	Drew 1-1	Caracciolo	26,440
April 9, 2006 – 15.00	Cagliari	Away	Drew 1-1	Di Michele	10,000
April 15, 2006 – 15.00	AS Roma	Home	Drew 3-3	Di Michele, Barone (2)	27,855
April 22, 2006 – 15.00	Livorno	Away	Lost 1-3	Tedesco	10,635
April 30, 2006 – 15.00	Fiorentina	Home	Won 1-0	Di Michele	30,056
May 7, 2006 – 15.00	Juventus	Away	Lost 1-2	Godeas	56,488
May 14, 2006 – 15.00	Messina	Home	Won 1-0	Godeas	26,558

=== UEFA Cup ===
Date and time	Round	Opponent	Venue	Result	Scorers	Attendance
September 15, 2005 – 20.30	1st Round – 1st Leg	(Cyprus) Anorthosis Famagusta	Home	Won 2-1	Corini, Brienza	13,047
September 29, 2005 – 17.00	1st Round – 2nd Leg	(Cyprus) Anorthosis Famagusta	Away	Won 4-0	Caracciolo, Makinwa (2), Santana	12,000
October 20, 2005 – 17.00	Group Stage – Group B	(Israel) Maccabi Petah Tikva	Away	Won 2-1	Brienza, Terlizzi	2,000
November 3, 2005 – 21.00	Group Stage – Group B	(Russia) Lokomotiv Moscow	Home	Drew 0-0		15,823
November 24, 2005 – 21.15	Group Stage – Group B	(Spain) Espanyol	Away	Drew 1-1	González	22,000
December 15, 2005 – 20.45	Group Stage – Group B	(Denmark) Brøndby	Home	Won 3-0	Makinwa, Rinaudo (2)	4,521
February 16, 2006 – 20.45	Round of 32 – 1st Leg	(Czech Republic) Slavia Praha	Away	Lost 1-2	Tedesco	6,706
February 23, 2006 – 16.00	Round of 32 – 2nd Leg	(Czech Republic) Slavia Praha	Home	Won 1-0	Godeas	8,063
March 9, 2006 – 18.00	Round of 16 – 1st Leg	(Germany) Schalke 04	Home	Won 1-0	Brienza	10,581
March 16, 2006 – 20.30	Round of 16 – 2nd Leg	(Germany) Schalke 04	Away	Lost 0-3		52,151

=== Coppa Italia ===
Date and time	Round	Opponent	Venue	Result	Scorers	Attendance
December 7, 2005 – 18.00	Round of 16 – 1st Leg	Bari	Away	Drew 0-0		2,969
January 10, 2006 – 15.00	Round of 16 – 2nd Leg	Bari	Home	Won 5-4	González (2), Corini, Biava, Terlizzi	1,470
January 25, 2006 – 21.00	Quarter-finals – 1st Leg	AC Milan	Away	Lost 0-1		2,105
January 31, 2006 – 21.00	Quarter-finals – 2nd Leg	AC Milan	Home	Won 3-0	González (2), Caracciolo	10,739
March 22, 2006 – 18.15	Semi-finals – 1st Leg	AS Roma	Home	Won 2-1	Brienza, Mutarelli	12,847
April 12, 2006 – 21.00	Semi-finals – 2nd Leg	AS Roma	Away	Lost 0-1		49,790

== Player details ==
No.	Pos	Nat	Player	Total		Serie A		UEFA Cup		Coppa Italia	
No.	Pos	Nat	Player	Apps	Goals	Apps	Goals	Apps	Goals	Apps	Goals
1	GK	(Italy) ITA	Federico Agliardi	17	-21	10	-10	0	0	7	-11
13	GK	(Italy) ITA	Cristiano Lupatelli	16	-26	13	-25	0	0	3	-1
24	GK	(Argentina) ARG	Mariano Gonzalo Andújar	21	-21	11	-10	7	-6	3	-5
2	DF	(Italy) ITA	Cristian Zaccardo	44	0	36	0	4	0	4	0
11	DF	(Italy) ITA	Fabio Grosso	47	0	33	0	8	0	6	0
21	DF	(Italy) ITA	Giuseppe Biava	22	2	17	1	1	0	4	1
23	DF	(Italy) ITA	Christian Terlizzi	33	7	21	5	8	1	4	1
25	DF	(Sierra Leone) SLE	Kewullay Conteh	11	0	6	0	4	0	1	0
32	DF	(Italy) ITA	Pietro Accardi	12	0	6	0	3	0	3	0
43	DF	(Italy) ITA	Andrea Barzagli	47	2	35	2	8	0	4	0
77	DF	(Italy) ITA	Leandro Rinaudo	17	2	10	0	5	2	2	0
4	MF	(Italy) ITA	Giovanni Tedesco	19	4	14	3	4	1	1	0
5	MF	(Italy) ITA	Eugenio Corini	37	5	27	3	6	1	4	1
8	MF	(Italy) ITA	Simone Barone	48	3	36	3	7	0	5	0
18	MF	(Argentina) ARG	Mario Santana	40	1	28	0	9	1	3	0
19	MF	(Argentina) ARG	Mariano González	44	7	30	2	9	1	5	4
20	MF	(Romania) ROU	Paul Costantin Codrea	22	0	12	0	6	0	4	0
22	MF	(Italy) ITA	Massimo Mutarelli	33	3	23	2	8	0	2	1
10	FW	(Italy) ITA	Franco Brienza	39	5	27	1	9	3	3	1
17	FW	(Italy) ITA	David Di Michele	40	10	35	10	0	0	5	0
26	FW	(Nigeria) NGA	Stephen Makinwa	33	8	23	5	8	3	2	0
29	FW	(Italy) ITA	Andrea Caracciolo	46	11	35	9	6	1	5	1
59	FW	(Italy) ITA	Gianluca Palmiteri	3	0	1	0	0	0	2	0
99	FW	(Italy) ITA	Denis Godeas	23	4	15	3	3	1	5	0
Players sold or loaned out during the January transfer market:
1	GK	(Italy) ITA	Nicola Santoni	11	-15	8	-14	2	-1	1	0
99	GK	(Italy) ITA	Matteo Guardalben	7	-9	6	-8	1	-1	0	0
81	DF	(Italy) ITA	Michele Ferri	14	2	8	2	4	0	2	0
6	MF	(Italy) ITA	Massimo Bonanni	25	2	18	2	4	0	3	0
9	FW	(Italy) ITA	Simone Pepe	6	0	3	0	3	0	0	0

=== January transfer market bids ===
In

1	GK	ITA	Federico Agliardi (from Brescia)
13	GK	ITA	Cristiano Lupatelli (on loan from Fiorentina)
4	MF	ITA	Giovanni Tedesco (from Genoa)
17	FW	ITA	David Di Michele (from Udinese)
99	FW	ITA	Denis Godeas (from Triestina)

Out

1	GK	ITA	Nicola Santoni (co-ownership deal with Udinese, loaned to Brescia)
99	GK	ITA	Matteo Guardalben (loaned to Parma)
81	DF	ITA	Michele Ferri (co-ownership deal with Cagliari)
6	MF	ITA	Massimo Bonanni (loaned to Lazio)
9	FW	ITA	Simone Pepe (co-ownership deal with Udinese)
