= Bernt Christian Birkeland =

Norwegian football player (born 1974)

Personal information
- Date of birth: 16 July 1974 (age 52)
- Place of birth: Norway
- Position: Midfielder

Youth career
- Start

Senior career*
Years	Team	Apps	(Gls)
–1996	Start	42	(1)
1997	Skeid	17	(1)
1999	Marsala		
2000	Kongsvinger	6	(0)
- * Club domestic league appearances and goals

Bernt Christian Birkeland (born 16 July 1974) is a Norwegian former footballer who played as a midfielder.

== Career ==
Birkeland started his career with Norwegian side Start, where he made 42 league appearances and scored 1 goal. On 17 April 1994, Birkeland debuted for Start during a 0–2 loss to Rosenborg. On 21 April 1996, he scored his first goal for Start during a 3–3 draw with Bodø/Glimt. In 1999, Birkeland signed for Marsala in the Italian third tier after trialing for Portuguese top flight club Boavista and Aberdeen in the Scottish top flight. Before the 2000 season, he signed for Norwegian second-tier team Kongsvinger.
