= Bruno Tedino =

Italian football manager (born 1964)

Personal information
- Date of birth: 13 August 1964 (age 62)
- Place of birth: Treviso, Italy

Team information
- Current team: Union Clodiense Chioggia (head coach)

Managerial career
- Years: Team
- 1994–1995: Montebelluna
- 1997–1998: Sandonà
- 1998–1999: Novara
- 1999–2001: Pordenone
- 2003–2004: Südtirol
- 2004–2005: Pistoiese
- 2006–2007: Pistoiese
- 2007–2008: Sangiovannese
- 2009–2010: Città di Jesolo
- 2010–2011: SandonàJesolo
- 2013–2014: Italy U16
- 2014–2015: Italy U17
- 2015–2017: Pordenone
- 2017–2018: Palermo
- 2018: Palermo
- 2019–2020: Teramo
- 2020: Virtus Entella
- 2021–2022: Pordenone
- 2022–2024: Trento
- 2025–: Union Clodiense Chioggia

Bruno Tedino (born 13 August 1964) is an Italian professional football coach and former player, currently in charge of Union Clodiense Chioggia.

== Managerial career ==
After a short career as a player cut short by an injury at the age of 22, Tedino turned to management and took his first role in 1986 as youth coach of Sandonà. He then also served as youth coach for other teams such as Treviso, Conegliano and Montebelluna.

From 1995 to 1997 he worked as youth coach of Venezia, during the ownership of Maurizio Zamparini. He took over his first professional head coaching role in 1997, at the age of 32, with Serie C2 club Sandonà. He successively worked as head coach for a variety of other Northern Italian teams in the lower leagues, such as Novara, Pordenone, Südtirol, Pistoiese, Sangiovannese and Città di Jesolo (then SandonàJesolo).

In 2013, he was personally picked by Arrigo Sacchi, then coordinator of the Italian youth national teams, as the new head coach of the Italy U16; he was successively promoted in charge of the Italy U17 one year later. In 2015 he left his role in order to accept an offer from Pordenone; after the club was readmitted to Lega Pro to fill a vacancy, he guided it to two consecutive promotion playoff participation in 2016 and 2017, losing to Pisa and Parma (the latter on penalties) at the semi-finals in both occasions.

On 22 June 2017, it was announced he was the new head coach of Serie B club Palermo, in what would represent his first appearance in the second tier of Italian football, as well as his first coaching experience in Southern Italy. Under his managership, Palermo ended the first half of the season in first place, but experienced a decline in results towards the end of the season, resulting to the Rosanero being overtaken by Empoli and reached by Frosinone and Parma; a 0–3 loss to Venezia which put automatic promotion in danger with five games to go eventually led to Tedino being removed from his coaching post and replaced by Roberto Stellone on 28 April 2018.

In June 2018, he returned to Palermo, being named as head coach for the 2018–19 Serie B campaign after the club missed promotion to Serie A following a two-legged defeat to Frosinone in the playoff finals. After a lackluster start to the season, he was however sacked again on 26 September 2018 following a 1–2 loss to Brescia.

On 1 July 2019, Tedino was announced as new head coach of Serie C club Teramo. He was dismissed on 16 February 2020 due to poor results.

On 17 August 2020, he replaced Roberto Boscaglia as manager of Serie B side Virtus Entella. He was dismissed on 23 November 2020 following a dismal start to the season.

On 18 October 2021, Tedino signed a one-year contract with Serie B club Pordenone, thus returning in charge of the Ramarri four years after his departure in 2017. On 12 May 2022, after failing to save Pordenone from relegation, the club announced Tedino would not be confirmed as head coach.

On 11 October 2022, he was hired by Serie C club Trento. He was dismissed on 10 October 2024.

On 18 January 2025, Tedino took over at bottom-placed Serie C club Union Clodiense Chioggia.
