= Santiago Vernazza =

Argentine footballer

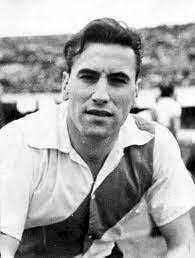
- Vernazza in River Plate

Personal information
- Full name: Julio Carlos Santiago Vernazza
- Date of birth: 23 September 1928
- Place of birth: Buenos Aires, Argentina
- Date of death: 12 November 2017 (aged 89)
- Place of death: Buenos Aires, Argentina
- Height: 1.75 m (5 ft 9 in)
- Positions: Attacking midfielder; right winger; striker

Senior career*
Years	Team	Apps	(Gls)
1947–1951	Platense	109	(53)
1951–1956	River Plate	163	(60)
1956–1960	Palermo	115	(51)
1960–1961	AC Milan	29	(14)
1961–1963	Lanerossi Vicenza	30	(3)
Total		446	(181)

International career
	Argentina	6	(1)
- * Club domestic league appearances and goals

Julio Carlos Santiago "Ghito" Vernazza (23 September 1928 – 12 November 2017) was an Argentine footballer. He was a forward who played for Platense and River Plate in his native Argentina until 1956, when he moved to Italy and signed for newly promoted Serie A club Palermo. He played four seasons in Sicily, two in Serie A and two in Serie B, scoring over 50 goals and becoming one of the major players in the team history.

In 1960/1961, Vernazza played for A.C. Milan, where he obtained a second place. In 1961/1962, he moved to Vicenza, where he played two seasons before retiring in 1963 at the age of 35.

In April 2009, Palermo paid tribute to Vernazza with an official invitation in the Sicilian capital city. He was also awarded and presented to the Stadio Renzo Barbera public before the Serie A league game against Torino.

== Honours ==
River Plate

- Argentine Primera División: 1952, 1953, 1955, 1956
- Copa Ibarguren: 1952

Argentina

- Copa América: 1955
