= Carmelo Di Bella =

Italian footballer and manager (1921–1992)

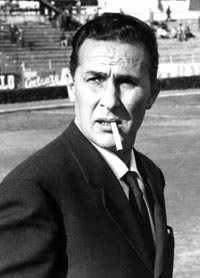
- Di Bella as a manager

Personal information
- Date of birth: January 30, 1921
- Place of birth: Catania, Italy
- Date of death: September 9, 1992 (aged 71)
- Place of death: Palermo, Italy
- Position: Left wing

Youth career
- Catania

Senior career*
Years	Team	Apps	(Gls)
1939–1941	Catania	49	(2)
1941–1949	Palermo	111	(12)
1949–1951	Igea Virtus		
1951–1952	Marsala		
1952–1954	Akragas		

Managerial career
- 1950–1951: Igea Virtus (player/manager)
- 1951–1952: Marsala (player/manager)
- 1952–1954: Akragas (player/manager)
- 1955–1957: Termitana
- 1957–1958: Catania (youth team)
- 1958–1966: Catania
- 1966–1967: Catanzaro
- 1967–1971: Palermo
- 1971–1973: Catania
- 1974–1976: Reggiana
- 1976–1977: Catania
- 1981: Palermo
- * Club domestic league appearances and goals

Carmelo Di Bella (January 30, 1921 – September 9, 1992) was an Italian football player and manager. Di Bella spent the vast majority of his career in Sicily where he was a prominent figure in the footballing scene, especially in relation to the island's most successful clubs; Catania and Palermo.

== Playing career ==
Di Bella, a left wing, started his professional career for his native city team Catania. From 1941 he played for Juventina Palermo, then renamed to Palermo in 1946. He also played a Serie A season with the rosanero, making nine appearances and scoring a goal in 1948–49. He retired from playing football in 1954, after two seasons as player/manager for minor team Akragas from Agrigento.

== Managing career ==
After two seasons as coach of minor team Termitana from Termini Imerese, Di Bella was appointed as Catania's youth team coach in 1957. In 1958–59, with just twelve matches remaining, Di Bella was called to replace Blagoje Marjanović with the goal to save the club from relegation to Serie C, with the initial support of technical director Felice Borel. Di Bella ended the season with a sixteenth place which allowed Catania to avoid relegation, and he was consequently confirmed at the helm of Catania. Di Bella coached Catania till 1966, when he resigned from his office, obtaining a Serie A promotion in 1960 and leading the Sicilian club to the Italian top division until his resignations. Di Bella then signed for Catanzaro, narrowly missing promotion to Serie A. In 1967, he became head coach of Palermo, where he immediately won Serie B bringing the rosanero back to Serie A. He left Palermo in 1971 to return to Catania, where however did not repeat his previous triumphs with the rossoblù (eighth, then fifth, in Serie B). In 1974, he became coach of Reggiana of Serie B: he avoided relegation in his first season, but not in the second. In 1976–77 he coached again Catania, but without being able to avoid relegation.

His last coaching effort, in 1981, was as Palermo boss: called to coach the rosanero since the 28th matchday, he helped the club to avoid relegation from Serie B.

Di Bella died in 1992 in Palermo.

=== Managerial statistics ===
Team	Nat	From	To	League Record					Cup Record					Total				
Team	Nat	From	To	G	W	D	L	Win %	G	W	D	L	Win %	G	W	D	L	Win %
U.S. Catanzaro 1929	Italy	1 July 1966	30 June 1967	38	14	14	10	36.84	1	0	0	1	0.00	39	14	14	11	35.90
U.S. Catanzaro 1929	Italy	13 January 1974	30 June 1974	23	7	9	7	30.43	0	0	0	0	—	23	7	9	7	30.43
Total				61	21	23	17	34.43	1	0	0	1	0.00	62	22	23	17	35.48

== Honours ==
=== Player ===
- 1941–42 Serie C (Palermo)
- 1947–48 Serie B (Palermo)

=== Manager ===
- 1967–68 Serie B (Palermo)
