= ASD Marsala 1912 =

Italian football club

Marsala
- Full name: Assocazione Sportiva Dilettantistica Marsala 1912
- Nicknames: Biancazzurri (White-blues); Lilybetani
- Founded: 1912
- Ground: Stadio Antonino Lombardo Angotta, Marsala, Italy
- Capacity: 13,500
- League: Promozione Sicily Group A
- 2022–23: Promozione Sicily Group A, 13th of 13
| Home colours | Away colours |

Assocazione Sportiva Dilettantistica Marsala 1912 is an Italian association football club based in the city of Marsala, Sicily. The club plays in Promozione Sicily Group A.

== History ==
Marsala was founded in 1912. It is also known as lilybetani, after Lilybaeum, the ancient name of Marsala during the Roman period.

After the First World War, it was entered into the Coppa Federale Siciliana, which was competed amongst the top Sicilian sides Marsala, Palermo, Messinese and Catanese. Marsala lost heavily in the semi-finals against eventual winner Palermo.

The club's first professional appearance was in 1942, when the team ended round N of Serie C in sixth place. Since then, Marsala has played 28 other times at the Serie C level, narrowly missing promotion to Serie B in 1960 (second placed in round C) and launching several young players who then obtained notoriety even at the worldwide level, such as Marco Materazzi and Patrice Evra.

The team declared bankruptcy in 2000 after a Serie C1 season ended with a relegation. A new team, Associazione Sportiva Marsala 2000, was founded as a relocation of the existing Eccellenza club Don Bosco Partinico. The team was immediately promoted to Serie D, but it was cancelled in 2004 immediately after another relegation after losing playoffs to Ariano Irpino, again because of financial troubles.

Following the 2006–07 season, four teams were representing the city of Marsala:

- U.S.D. Petrosino Marsala, an Eccellenza team officially based in Petrosino but playing its home matches in Marsala;
- S.C. Marsala A.S.D., a minor local club formerly known as Bosco 1970 that were crowned Promozione champions in 2007, being therefore elected to play Eccellenza the following season;
- U.S. Kennedy J.F., a Prima Categoria club hailing from the local frazione of Birgi, home of the Trapani-Birgi Airport, that gained promotion to Promozione in 2007;
- and S.C. Marsala 1912, the direct and legal heir of the historical local club, re-registered to the Italian Football Federation in 2006, which played and won Seconda Categoria in 2006–2007.

In June 2007, after failing to find an agreement with Sport Club Marsala, Marsala 1912 agreed to merge with Kennedy Birgi. The new club assumed the denomination of A.S.D. S.C. Marsala 1912, and participated in the 2007–08 regionally organized Promozione league. In 2008–09, Marsala 1912 won promotion to Eccellenza through play-offs, after defeating Palermo-based club Sporting Arenella in the final, so they played in the Italian 6th tier the following season.

In the 2011–12 season, Marsala was relegated to Eccellenza. After some seasons in the minor leagues, Marsala returned to Serie D in 2015 under head coach Rosario Pergolizzi; the club was, however, relegated back to Eccellenza in the first season, then returning to Serie D in 2018, staying in the top Italian amateur tier for two seasons before a period of steep decline that led them to get down to Eccellenza and then Promozione.

In 2024, the club acquired the sports title of Eccellenza club Mazara 46 (formerly known as Mazarese), and assured a place in the top regional amateur as a consequence.

== Colors and badge ==
The official and historical colours of the club are white and blue.
