= Paul Baccaglini =

American basketball player (1984–2025)

- Born: January 31, 1984; Chicago, Illinois, U.S.
- Died: September 9, 2025 (aged 41); Segrate, Italy
- Occupations: Businessman, television personality
- Known for: Chairman of Palermo

Paul Mario Baccaglini (January 31, 1984 – September 9, 2025) was an American-born Italian businessman and television personality, who was chairman of Palermo Football club.

Baccaglini was an eccentric personality, known for his career in Italian television. In 2017, he made news by attempting to acquire the Palermo soccer club from owner Maurizio Zamparini; the takeover, originally agreed in March 2017, was called off by June of the same year before being finalized.

== Life and career ==
Raised in the United States by an American father and Italian mother, Baccaglini was born in Chicago but spent most of his youth in Pittsburgh, Pennsylvania. Baccaglini's mother came to the United States to study neurobiology at Harvard University, while his father is from Washington. His parents separated when he was 15 years old.

After graduating from high school, Baccaglini later moved to his mother's native Italy to pursue a career in basketball. Baccaglini played two years with the Serie C Gold Unione Basket Padova basketball club from 2002 to 2003, concluding his brief career with the Solesino basketball club.

=== Television personality ===
Leaving behind his sporting career, Baccaglini transitioned into work in radio, working for Radio Padova as host of the program "The Groove" for three years on RTL 102.5. Following his success in radio, Baccaglini began work for MTV and Italia 1, appearing regularly on the program Le Iene, on which he interviewed numerous personalities in politics. Baccaglini was known for his use of sarcasm and irony, and the program was well-known for deploying its hosts to dupe public figures for comic effect.

Baccaglini claimed in an interview with La Gazzetta dello Sport that he had more than 60 tattoos.

=== U.S. Città di Palermo ===
Baccaglini negotiated the purchase of U.S. Città di Palermo in secret for more than one year before finally coming to terms with former owner Maurizio Zamparini in March 2017. As part of the agreement, he was named as club chairman until the takeover was not finalized. In his initial press conference, he declared that his goal was to bring Palermo to be one of the best teams in Serie A, and to compete in the UEFA Champions League. Despite his initial enthusiasm for the potential takeover, Palermo's win-loss record did not improve enough to prevent the club from relegating to Serie B for the 2017–18 season.

On July 4, 2017, Baccaglini resigned as Palermo chairman, and the club fell back into the hands of Zamparini, after the necessary funds were not in place.

=== Death ===
Baccaglini was found dead at his home in Segrate, on September 9, 2025, at the age of 41.
