= Coppa Federale Siciliana =

Coppa Federale Siciliana (which translates as the Sicilian Federal Cup) was a Sicilian football competition which took place during May 1920. The tournament took place just once, in the aftermath of World War I. The winners of the competition were Palermo.

Sicilian football clubs were not entered into the Italian Football Championship after the war and the tournament was organized in an attempt to set up a viable alternative for the four main clubs on the island at the time; Palermo, Messinese, Catanese and Marsala. A couple of notable ommissons from the competition were Trapani and Paternò.

== Semi-finals ==
	First Leg, 5-5-1920
Messinese	9 - 1*	Catanese
Palermo	7 - 0	Marsala

	Second Leg, 11-5-1920
Catanese	2 - 6**	Messinese
Marsala	0 - 1	Palermo

(*) result uncertain, either 9-1 or 2-0 in favour of Messinese.

(**) Could be non-disputed because of problems with stadium.

== Final ==
=== First leg ===
	Palermo, 18-5-1920
Palermo	3 - 2	Messinese

=== Second leg ===
	Messina, 23-5-1920
Messinese	0 - 0	Palermo

Messinese: Lucchesi, Prestamburgo, Nebbia, Fulci, Stracuzzi, Starvaggi, De Zardo, Barone, Gallina, De Nicola, Allegra.

Palermo: De Lucia, Bottega, Mannino, Sichera, Trabucco, Pirandello, Grippi, Aliotta, Brancaleone, Ferro, Frangipane.

Referee: Peregalli.
