= Renzo Barbera =

Italian businessman and football chairman (1920 – 2002)

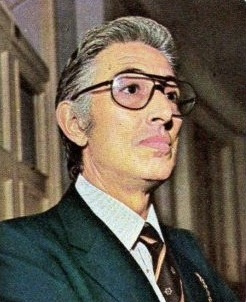
- Renzo Barbera, 1972
- Born: 19 April 1920; Palermo
- Died: 20 May 2002 (aged 82); Palermo
- Occupation: Businessman

Renzo Barbera (19 April 1920 in Palermo – 20 May 2002 in Palermo) was an Italian businessman and the chairman of Palermo Football Club from 1970 to 1980. He was nicknamed "Presidentissimo" and "The Last Leopard".

During his presidency the "rosanero" team reached two Coppa Italia finals in 1974 (against Bologna) and in 1979 (against Juventus). After the experience as chairman of Palermo, he was elected president of the Sicilian Organising Committee of the 1990 FIFA World Cup. He died on 20 May 2002 of heart disease.

On 18 September 2002, the Palermo stadium La Favorita was renamed as Renzo Barbera.

== Biography ==
He was the son of Giuseppe (founder of "Latteria Barbera" and supporting member of Palermo FC in the 1930s) and Maria Rutelli.

His maternal grandfather was the renowned sculptor Mario Rutelli. His paternal grandfather, also named Lorenzo Barbera, was an oil merchant and a Cavaliere del Lavoro. Since 2019, his great-grandson, Dario Mirri, has been president of Palermo FC.

An officer in the Royal Italian Army during World War II, he was taken prisoner by the Germans in 1943. He managed to escape during a transfer and was then hidden by some farmers and shepherds in the Ciociaria region. Married to Giuliana Cicutto, he had three children: Giuseppe, Ferruccio (1951–2005), and Maria Ludovica.

Renzo Barbera died in the early hours of May 19, 2002, at the age of 82, due to heart complications.
