= Stadio Renzo Barbera =

Football stadium in Palermo, Italy

Coordinates: 38°9′9.96″N 13°20′32.19″E

- La Favorita
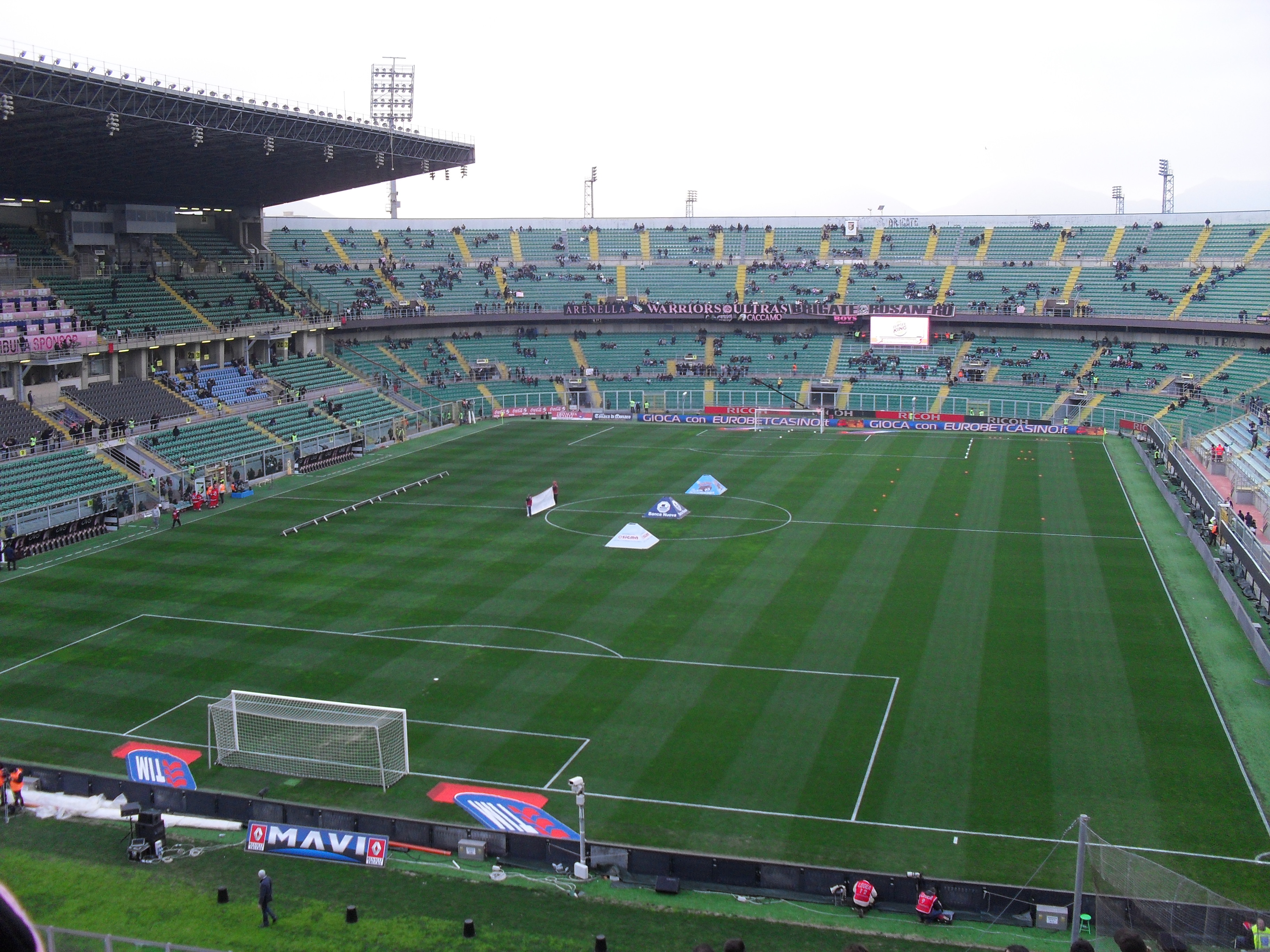
- Interactive map of Stadio Renzo Barbera
- Full name: Stadio Comunale Renzo Barbera
- Former names: Stadio Littorio (1932–1936); Stadio Michele Marrone (1936–1945); Stadio La Favorita (1945–2002)
- Location: Palermo, Italy
- Owner: Municipality of Palermo
- Capacity: 36,365
- Surface: Grass
- Field size: 105 x 68 m

Construction
- Opened: 24 January 1932
- Renovated: 1989

Tenants
- Palermo FC (1932–present); Italy national football team (selected matches)

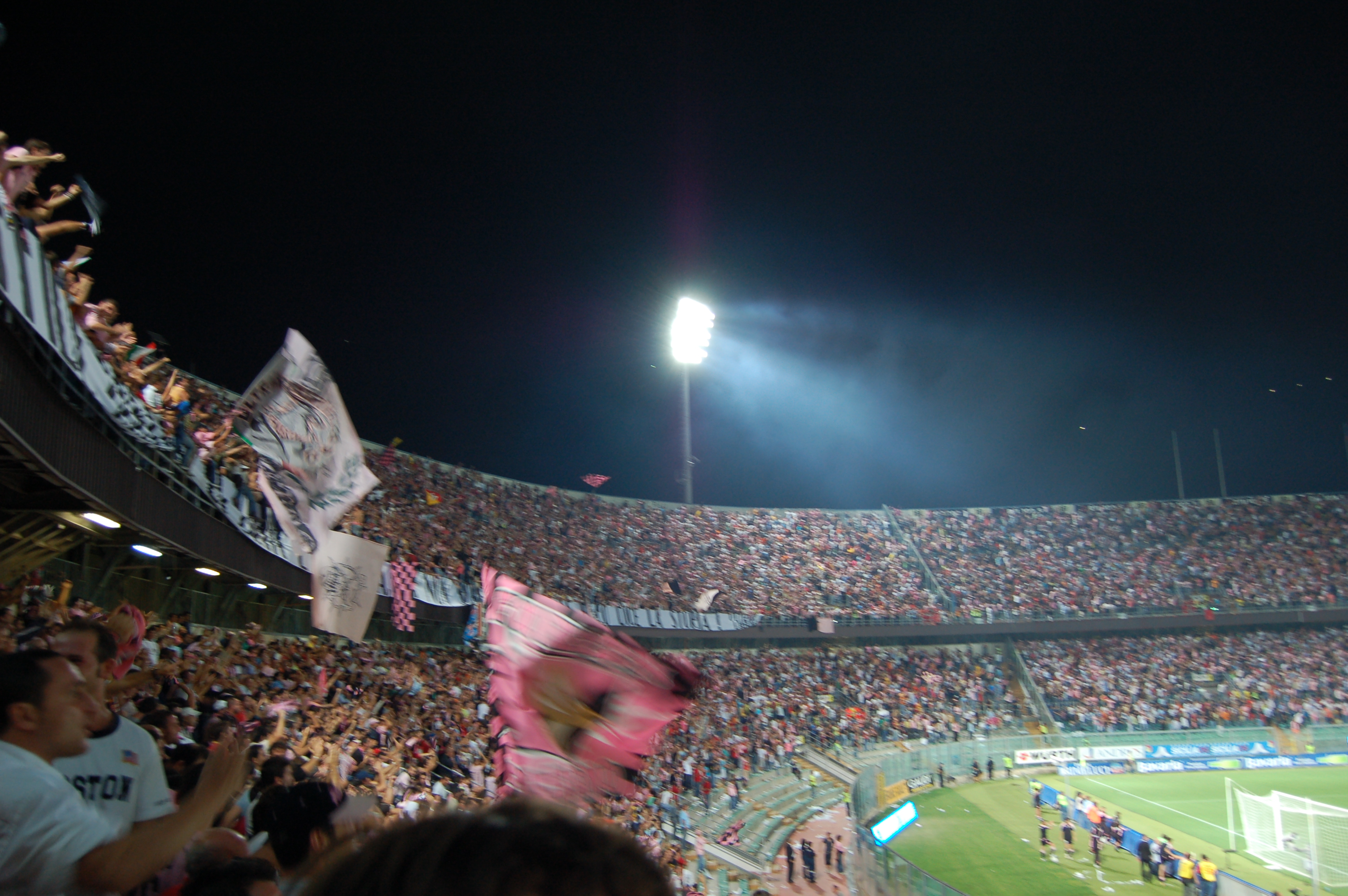
Palermo fans at Stadio Renzo Barbera during a league game

Stadio Renzo Barbera (commonly known as La Favorita) is a football stadium in Palermo, Italy. It is currently the home stadium of Palermo FC. The stadium was inaugurated during the fascist era on 24 January 1932, and was originally named Stadio Littorio after the Italian word for the fasces symbol. The opening match was Palermo vs Atalanta, with Palermo winning 5–1. A running track surrounded the pitch, and there were no stands behind either goal. In 1936, the stadium was renamed Stadio Michele Marrone, in memory of a soldier killed during the Spanish Civil War. In 1945, the name was changed again at the end of World War II to Stadio La Favorita, taken from the name of the local ancient game preserve of Frederick II, Holy Roman Emperor in the 13th century.

In 1948, the running track was removed, and stands were built behind each goal. The stadium then remained essentially unchanged until 1984, when a second major redevelopment took place, involving the addition of a second tier to the stadium, which increased the total capacity to 50,000 spectators. This maximum capacity was, however, only reached twice: in a Serie C1 league match against Sicilian rivals Messina, and for a friendly match against Juventus. A third, and to date the most recent, modernisation of the stadium took place in 1990, due to the city of Palermo having been chosen to host a number of the 1990 FIFA World Cup First Round matches. A tragic accident occurred during the course of these works, resulting in the deaths of five construction workers. Following this redevelopment, the total capacity of the stadium was lowered to its current 37,619 seats.

On 18 September 2002 the stadium was officially renamed as Stadio Comunale Renzo Barbera, in honour of the chairman of Palermo during the club's last Serie A tenure, as well as the two Coppa Italia finals throughout the 1960s and the 1970s, who had died that same year on 19 May. In the Serie A 2004–05 campaign, which marked Palermo's first appearance in the top division for over 30 years, all seats in the stadium were already sold before the season began to season-ticket holders. However, this was not repeated in the following years.

In May 2026, the city announced a plan for redevelopment of the stadium. The goal would be to have the redevelopment reintegrated into UEFA Euro 2032 hosting as well as allow the stadium to host other competitions and events. The redevelopment would include a fully covered roof, stands closer to the pitch, new hospitality suites, improved disability access, and larger areas for concessions and special events. A new club headquarters would be built as part of the redevelopment featuring a club museum, offices, and fan experiences.

== Transport ==
The stadium is linked to the city center and the central railway station by regular bus route 101.

== 1990 FIFA World Cup ==
The stadium was one of the venues of the 1990 FIFA World Cup, and staged the following matches:

Date	Team #1	Res.	Team #2	Round
12 June 1990	Netherlands	1–1	Egypt	Group F
17 June 1990	Republic of Ireland	0–0	Egypt	Group F
21 June 1990	Republic of Ireland	1–1	Netherlands	Group F

== Concerts ==
The stadium was frequently used as a music concert venue during the 1980s. Starting in the 1990s, however, concerts and other cultural events were gradually banned from the stadium due to fears they could damage the grass on the field. The Renzo Barbera Stadium is currently the only stadium in Italy where concerts are prohibited. From the early 1990s, large open air concerts in Palermo were held at the Velodromo Paolo Borsellino instead.

Below is a list of artists who have performed at the Renzo Barbera Stadium in the past.

Date	Band/Artist	Tour	Notes
17, 18, 19 July 1970	Aretha Franklin; Duke Ellington; Johnny Halliday; Arthur Brown; Little Tony; Rosa Balistreri; Ricchi e Poveri; and others	Palermo Pop Festival 70	Led Zeppelin and the Rolling Stones were announced as headliners, but both bands cancelled their appearances. Arthur Brown was arrested after an impromptu striptease on stage. He was released on the premise that he would never return to Sicily again.
5, 6, 7 September 1971	Black Sabbath; Manfred Mann's Earth Band; The Pretty Things; and others	Palermo Pop Festival 71	
17 July 1980	Antonello Venditti	Buona Domenica Tour	
14 July 1982	Frank Zappa	1982 European Tour	A riot occurred during "Cocaine Decisions" in which the police fired tear-gas into the crowd. Zappa was reported as stating "We played for an hour and a half with tear-gas in our face and everything else, and when it was all over we went off stage and we were trapped inside this place. It wasn't a lot of fun". The riot inspired the back cover of the album The Man From Utopia.
21 July 1982	Claudio Baglioni	Alè-oò Tour	
22 August 1985	Vasco Rossi	Cosa succede in città Tour	
5 to 11 July 1986	Miles Davis; Herbie Hancock with Branford Marsalis; Pat Metheny Trio; Wayne Shorter Quartet; and others	Jazz Estate '86: Fusion Time Festival	The festival was held over a period of one week. Due to concerns over the grass, the playing field remained off-limits for the audience. The stage was set up in front of the southern tribune stands. Attendance averaged 10,000 patrons per day.
28 May 1987	Duran Duran	The Strange Behaviour Tour	
13 June 1987	Frank Sinatra	Italian Tour	
4 August 1987	Spandau Ballet	Through the Barricades Tour	
11 August 1987	Antonello Venditti	Venditti e segreti Tour	
27 August 1992	Antonello Venditti	Alta marea Tour	
10 June 1994	Pino Daniele, Eros Ramazzotti & Jovanotti	Pino, Jova, Eros in concerto	
29 September 1994	Adriano Celentano	European Tour	Cancelled due to US Palermo's concerns about possible damage to the grass on the playing field. The concert was scheduled to take place only 4 days before a match.
28 September 1995	Antonello Venditti	Ogni volta Tour	
1 July 1997	Zucchero	The Best Of Tour	
13 August 1998	Claudio Baglioni	Da me a te Tour	The concert was promoted as an anti-mafia event in the press and attracted around 41,000 fans, grossing 2 billion Italian lira (US$1.2 million), becoming the highest grossing non-sporting event at the stadium.
12 July 2003	Claudio Baglioni	Tutto in un abbraccio Tour	Cancelled due to restructuring works on the field.
22, 23 June 2023	Vasco Rossi	Vasco Live 2023	
