= Palermo FC =

Association football club in Italy

Palermo
- Full name: Palermo Football Club
- Nicknames: I Rosanero (The Pink and Blacks); Le Aquile (The Eagles)
- Founded: 1 November 1900; 126 years ago as Anglo-Palermitan Athletic and Foot-Ball Club; 1920; 106 years ago as Unione Sportiva Palermo; 1928; 98 years ago 1941; 85 years ago as Unione Sportiva Palermo-Juventina; 1987; 39 years ago as Unione Sportiva Palermo; 1 August 2019; 7 years ago as Palermo Football Club
- Stadium: Stadio Renzo Barbera
- Capacity: 36,365
- Coordinates: 38°09′09.8″N 13°20′31.9″E
- Owner(s): City Football Group (94.94%); Hera Hora S.r.l. (5%); Associazione Amici Rosanero (0.06%)
- President: Dario Mirri
- Head coach: Filippo Inzaghi
- League: Serie B
- 2025–26: Serie B, 4th of 20
- Website: palermofc.com
Home colours	Away colours

Palermo Football Club (Italian pronunciation: [paˈlɛrmo]) is an Italian professional football club based in Palermo, Sicily, that currently plays in Serie B, the second division of Italian football. It is part of the City Football Group.

Founded for the first time on 1 November 1900 as Anglo Palermitan Athletic and Football Club, Palermo is one of the oldest clubs in Italy.

Among the club's accomplishments are a Coppa Italia Serie C, won in the 1992–93, and five Serie B league titles. It also appeared in three Coppa Italia finals: in 1973–74, in 1978–79 and in 2010–11. It has played 29 seasons in Serie A.

Internationally, the club has made five appearances in European competitions, all in the UEFA Cup/Europa League.

== History ==
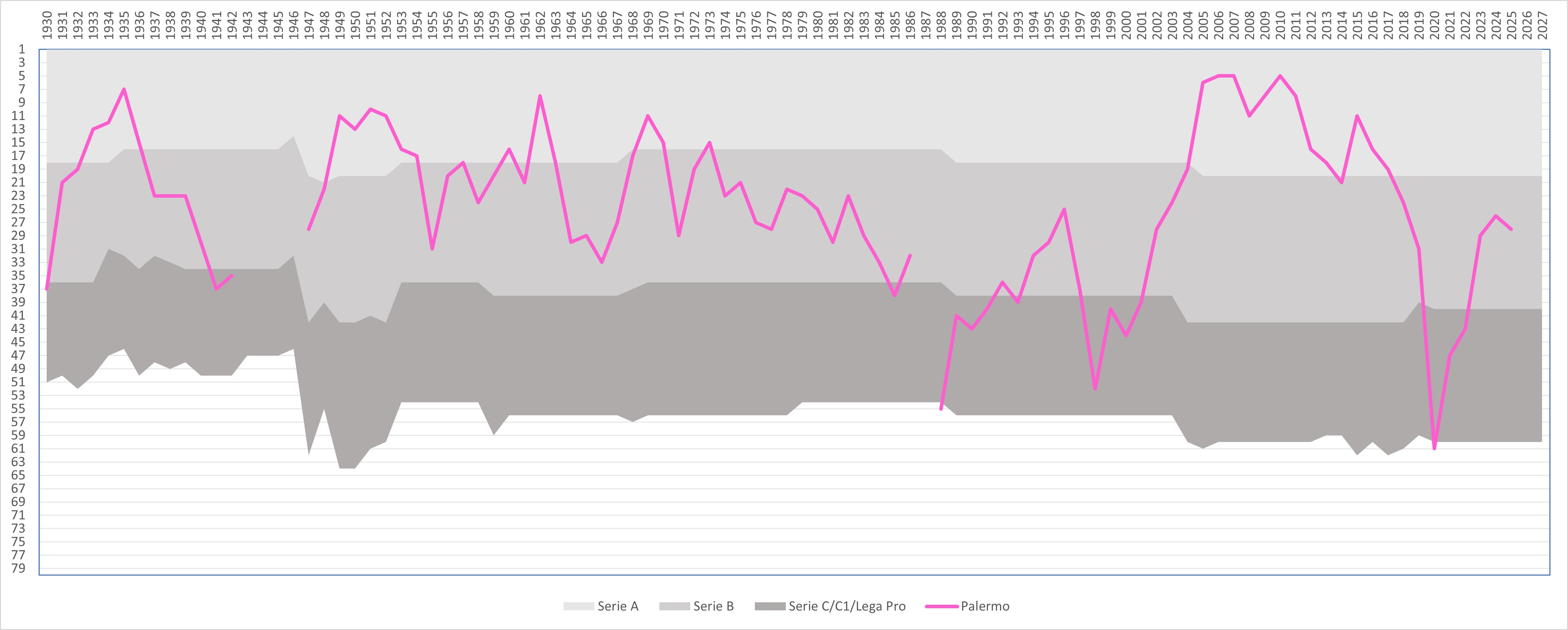
The performance of Palermo in the Italian football league structure since the first season of a unified Serie A (1929/30).

=== Early history (1898–1947) ===
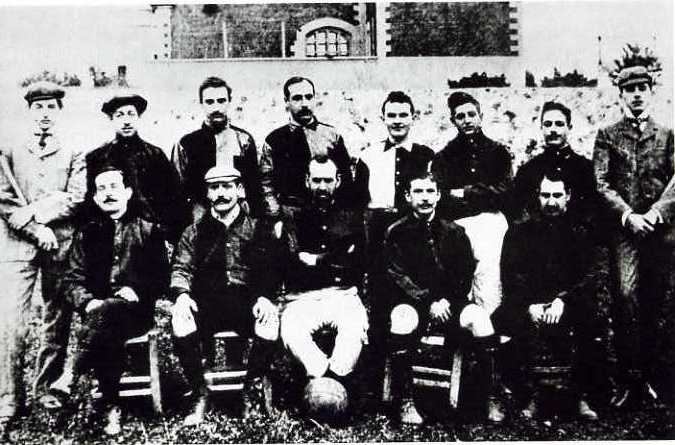
Historical first Anglo-Palermitan Athletic & Foot-Ball Club lineup, year 1900. The staff foundations of the Palermo football organization was composed of 3 Englishmen and 9 natives of Palermo, including: standing from left: De Garston, Olsen, Pirandello, Gaffiero, V. Piero, Marino, Giaconia, R. Pojero, Blake, Macaluso... Fourth person from left seated: Ignazio Majo Pagano

The history of the arrival of football in Palermo city is linked to the solid relationships that the high local bourgeoisie entertained with the British people. There is some debate and uncertainty about the exact date the club was founded. Some authorities believe that it may have been founded as early as 1898 due to the existence of papers addressed to Joseph Whitaker, English ornithologist in Palermo and originally believed to be first club president, about a Palermo football team founded in the month of April of that year. Conversely, another source cites that in April 1897, the future founders of Palermo Calcio founded the Sport Club. Joseph Whitaker have had an important role in the first years of the club: in 1902 he would then have been appointed honorary president, as evidenced by a letter dated March 14 of that year.

The most common and officially stated foundation date is 1 November 1900, as the Anglo-Palermitan Athletic and Foot-Ball Club. The club is thought to have been founded by Ignazio Majo Pagano, a young Palermitan colleague of Whitaker who had discovered football while at college in London in the UK, where the modern game of association football originated. The initial staff comprised three Englishmen and nine natives of Palermo, with Whitaker as honorary chairman, Edward De Garston as inaugural president and with red and blue as the original team colours. The first recorded football match, played by the team on 30 December 1900, ended in a 5–0 defeat to an unidentified amateur English team. The club's first official match, played on 18 April 1901 against Messina Football Club, ended in a 3–2 victory for the Palermitan side.

Palermo FBC logo

In 1907, the club changed its name to Palermo Foot-Ball Club, and the team colours were changed to the current pink and black. From 1908 until Italy's entry in World War I in 1915, Palermo was featured in the Lipton Challenge Cup, organised by Scottish businessman Sir Thomas Lipton. The competition saw them face off against Naples FBC; Palermo won the competition three times, including a 6–0 victory in 1912.

After a gap during the First World War, the club was refounded in 1919 as Unione Sportiva Palermo, by a committee of young university students and sportsmen. During the early 1920s, the club mainly competed in the Campionato Lega Sud, a football league in Southern Italy, reaching the semi-finals in 1924 before being knocked out by Audace Taranto, Alba Roma and Internaples. The club was dissolved in 1927 due to financial problems, but was reformed one year later following a merger with Vigor Palermo under the name Palermo Football Club. Originally admitted to Prima Divisione (First Division), the equivalent of today's Serie C1, the team was promoted to Serie B in 1930 and finally reached Serie A in 1932. From its debut season in Italy's top division, Palermo relocated to a new home, the Stadio Littorio (Lictorian Stadium) in the Favorita neighbourhood, today known as Stadio Renzo Barbera. The club played in Serie A until 1936, when they were relegated to Serie B and first played Catania in the Sicilian derby.

In 1936, Palermo was forced by the fascist regime to change its colours to yellow and red, after the official colours of the local municipality. Meanwhile, economic difficulties arose, and in 1940 the club was expelled by the Italian Football Federation because of financial problems. A merger with Unione Sportiva Juventina Palermo brought the foundation of Unione Sportiva Palermo-Juventina, which joined Serie C in 1941 and Serie B in 1942.

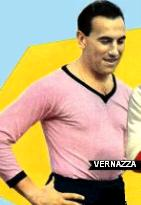
Palermo goalscorer, Santiago Vernazza

The club could not finish the 1942–43 season due to the outbreak of World War II. At the same time, the pink-and-black colours were chosen because Sicily became a "war zone". After the conflict, the club changed its name to Unione Sportiva Palermo.

=== Post-war years (1947–2002) ===
After World War II, the team returned to Serie A by winning the Serie B championship of 1947–48. The new Palermo squad featured players such as Czechoslovak legend Čestmír Vycpálek, who signed from Juventus alongside Conti, Carmelo Di Bella and Pavesi. Palermo played Serie A until they were relegated in 1954. Massive changes in the board, as well as the manager's job and the squad, proved successful, and the club returned to Serie A in 1956. Palermo became a "yo-yo club", bouncing up and down between the top two Italian leagues. Several stars played for Palermo during this period, such as Argentine striker Santiago Vernazza (51 goals in 115 games with the Rosanero), goalkeepers Roberto Anzolin and Carlo Mattrel, Giuseppe Furino and Franco Causio. Palermo marked its best campaign in 1961–62 season, finishing in eighth place in Serie A. In 1963, however, they were relegated to Serie B, where they played for five seasons.

Palermo played again in Serie A between 1968 and 1970. In 1968, with the transformation of the football club into a joint-stock company, Palermo changed its name to Società Sportiva Calcio Palermo and moreover, in that year, the team returned in Serie A in the 1967–68 Serie B, with the former player and coach Carmelo Di Bella. In December of the new season, Palermo took part in its second and last Mitropa Cup and, therefore, in its third and last participation in a European competition.

In 1970, Renzo Barbera took over the club as the new chairman. After 1973, Palermo FBC remained firmly rooted in Serie B. Despite this, Palermo reached two Italian Cup finals, both of which they narrowly lost: in 1974 to Bologna on penalty shoot-outs, and in 1979 to Juventus after extra time. Barbera left the club in 1980, and Palermo were relegated to Serie C1 four years later. The 1985–86 season, however, which ended in the summer, was the last for Palermo FBC, as, having just saved themselves from relegation, the club was expelled by the football federation due to financial problems. In the summer of 1987, after a year without professional football in Palermo, the club was re-founded bearing the name Unione Sportiva Città di Palermo and began to play in Serie C2, which it promptly won.

In the 1990s, Palermo played between Serie B and Serie C1 with a few highs, such as its 1995–96 Serie B and Coppa Italia campaign, the latter ending in the quarter-finals, and a number of lows such as the 1998 relegation to Serie C2 after defeat in the play-offs to Battipagliese, later revoked by the federation to fill a vacant league slot.

In March 2000, Roma chairman Franco Sensi led a holding company to purchase Palermo and Sergio D'Antoni became the president of Palermo and Palermo were promoted to Serie B one year later after a dramatic final week of the season, with Palermo coming back from behind to take first place from league-toppers Sicilian rivals Messina. The first comeback season in the Serie B, with Bortolo Mutti as head coach, was an eventless one, with Palermo ending in a mid-table placement.

=== The Zamparini era: back to Serie A and European years (2002–2013) ===
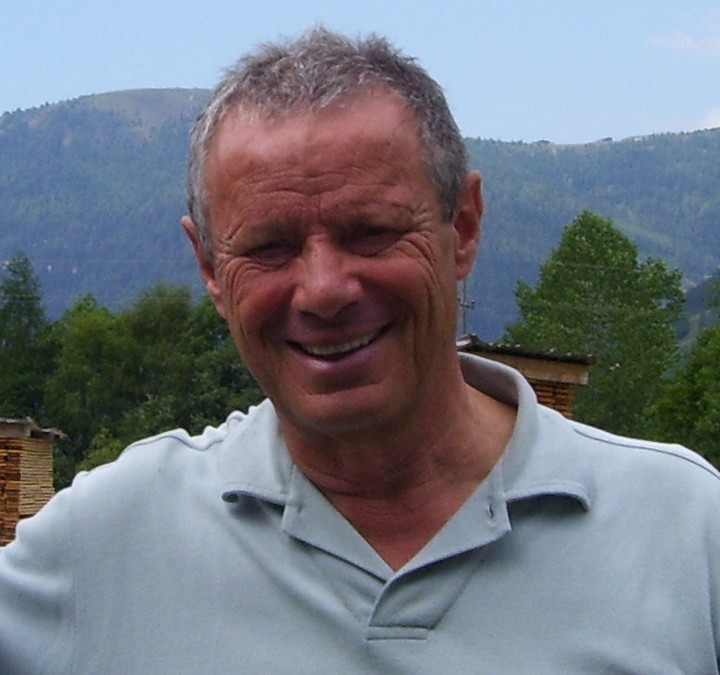
Palermo chairman and owner Maurizio Zamparini

In the summer of 2002, Friulian businessman and Venezia owner Maurizio Zamparini acquired the club from Franco Sensi in a €15 million bid, with the clear intention to bring Palermo back to Serie A and establish the club as a Serie A regular with aims of participations to European competitions. Palermo failed in its first attempt to reach the Serie A in 2002–03 on the final week of the season, but later managed to achieve it after a challenging but successful 2003–04 campaign which saw Palermo crowned as Serie B champions and promoted to Serie A after 31 years, under head coach Francesco Guidolin, who was hired in January 2004 as replacement for dismissed Silvio Baldini.

The 2004–05 season, the first in Serie A for the Palermo club since 1973, ended with an excellent sixth place, securing qualification for the 2005–06 UEFA Cup for the first time in its history. Luca Toni broke the Palermo Serie A scoring record by notching up 20 league goals. In the following season, despite an unimpressive eighth place in the Serie A table, Palermo reached the last 16 in the UEFA Cup as well as the Coppa Italia semi-finals. The club was however admitted to play UEFA Cup again due to the 2006 Calciopoli scandal, with Palermo players Andrea Barzagli, Cristian Zaccardo, Simone Barone and Fabio Grosso being crowned 2006 World Cup winners. Several impressive signings were made to establish an ambitious team, and a good beginning in the 2006–07 campaign appeared initially to confirm this. An 11-game winless streak, however, forced Palermo to fall down from third to seventh place, ending the season in fifth place and ensuring another UEFA Cup qualification. The club successively established as a force in the mid-table part of the Serie A league, also winning a Campionato Nazionale Primavera national title in 2009.

The following season started with new manager Walter Zenga, whose appointment from Sicilian arch-rivals Catania was greeted with surprise and dismay from supporters of both parties; Zenga's reign, however, lasted only 13 games, as he was dismissed on 23 November 2009 due to poor performances, ironically after a 1–1 home tie to Sicilian rivals and Zenga's former team, Catania, with former Lazio boss Delio Rossi being appointed at his place. Under the tutelage of Delio Rossi, results dramatically improved, and Palermo established a record of seven consecutive home wins, including wins against Italian giants Milan and Juventus, and emerging as serious contenders for a Champions League spot, which they ultimately lost to Sampdoria by only one point. Such season also launched new emerging stars such as midfielder Javier Pastore and goalkeeper Salvatore Sirigu, who went on to become integral part of their respective international teams.

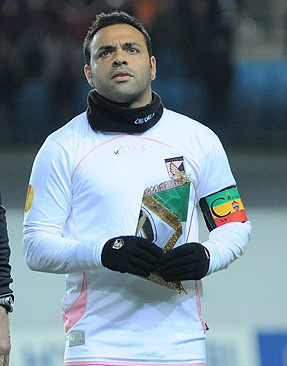
Former club captain Fabrizio Miccoli

The 2010–11 season started with Delio Rossi still in charge of the club, and also marked Palermo's return into continental football in the form of the UEFA Europa League. Palermo reached their third Coppa Italia finals after defeating Milan 4–3 on aggregate on 10 May 2011, losing 3–1 to Internazionale in the final, in what is considered one of the peak moments of Zamparini's period at the club.

=== Zamparini's later years and Serie B return (2011–2018) ===
For the 2011–12 season, Delio Rossi was replaced by former Chievo boss Stefano Pioli, who was, however, sacked before the Serie A kickoff after being eliminated by Swiss minnows FC Thun in the Europa League third preliminary round. New head coach Devis Mangia, despite no managerial experience other than at youth team and minor league level, turned Palermo fortunes by leading the Rosanero into fifth place thanks to an impressive string of six consecutive home wins, thus deserving a long-term deal at the club. A string of poor results, however, led Palermo to three straight defeats, including elimination from the Coppa Italia and a disappointing loss in the Sicilian derby, persuading Zamparini to replace Mangia with the more experienced Bortolo Mutti. Palermo finished 16th.

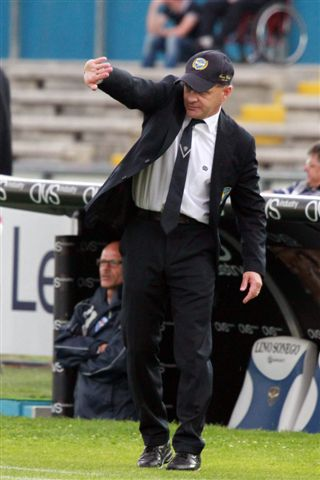
Giuseppe Iachini, formerly a Palermo midfielder in the 1990s, replaced Gattuso as head coach during the 2013–14 season and led the club to a Serie B champions title and broke the highest-Serie-B-point record

For the 2012–13 season, Zamparini came with another staff revolution, appointing Giorgio Perinetti as the new director of football and Giuseppe Sannino as the manager, both coming from Siena. A complete squad restructuring, a total five managerial changes and some staff changes (including a short stint with Pietro Lo Monaco as sports director) did not help, and Palermo ended its season in 18th place, being thus relegated to Serie B after nine consecutive seasons in the top flight.

For the new Serie B campaign, Zamparini appointed former Milan and Italy international star Gennaro Gattuso as the new manager, despite him having little prior managerial experience; he was sacked in September 2013, the 28th sacked manager in 11 years. Fortune was reversed rather rapidly, however, as Palermo regained promotion back to Serie A for the 2014–15 season under the guidance of new head coach Giuseppe Iachini, with the Rosanero completing a record-breaking Serie B season with 86 points, one more than previous record holders Juventus, Chievo and Sassuolo (all of them in the 22-team Serie B format).

With Iachini confirmed in charge, Palermo played a relatively successful 2014–15 Serie A season, narrowly missing a UEFA Europa League spot also thanks to the all-Argentine striking force of Paulo Dybala and Franco Vázquez.

In 2015–16 season, Palermo started their season without Dybala after the youngster moved to Juventus; the Rosanero therefore relied on senior striker Alberto Gilardino to play as a partner of Vázquez. Another long list of managerial changes during the season (seven in total, with Davide Ballardini as the final one) marked a very troublesome season, during which Palermo escaped relegation on the last day of the league with the necessary win over Hellas Verona 3–2, securing 16th place.

For the 2016–17 season, Zamparini re-appointed Rino Foschi as sporting director; however, he resigned after just a month in charge and was replaced by former Trapani director Daniele Faggiano. Most senior players such as Gilardino, Sorrentino, Vázquez and Maresca were sold and mostly replaced with Alessandro Diamanti plus several young and quasi-unknown foreign players. Ballardini, who was originally confirmed as head coach, left his position after a draw at Inter Milan at the second matchday of the season and was replaced with Serie A newbie Roberto De Zerbi who ended his stay after seven league losses in a row, with former club captain Eugenio Corini taking over. More managerial and staff changes followed with little luck and, on 27 February 2017, Zamparini stepped down as chairman of Palermo after 15 years in charge, announcing he had agreed in principle to sell his controlling stake to an unspecified Anglo-American fund, led by Italian-American Paul Baccaglini who was named new club president on 6 March.

Palermo ended the season in 19th place, being relegated to Serie B. The takeover, originally scheduled to be finalized by 30 April 2017 and then delayed by 30 June, eventually collapsed after Zamparini, who in the meantime had appointed Bruno Tedino as new head coach for the 2017–18 Serie B campaign, rejected the final offer he received from Baccaglini. On 4 July 2017, Baccaglini resigned as Palermo chairman, falling back into the hands of Zamparini, after the necessary funds were not in place.

Palermo's campaign in the 2017–18 Serie B aimed for an immediate return to the top flight, with Bruno Tedino as head coach and Fabio Lupo as director of football. Initially, the team's form was good, and the Rosanero ended the first half of the season in first place; however, a string of negative results led to the appointment of new manager Roberto Stellone, who was ultimately unable to win promotion, ending the regular season in fourth place and eventually losing the playoff finals to Frosinone.

=== New ownerships, financial issues and Serie B exclusion (2018–2019) ===
For the 2018–19 Serie B season, Palermo (with Rino Foschi back for a third time as sporting director) found themselves having to sell many players for financial reasons. On 22 November 2018, the club formally confirmed a takeover agreement between Zamparini and an undisclosed investor, later confirmed to be the London based Sport Capital Group Investments Ltd., with English businessman Clive Richardson, head of the new group, being named as new club chairman. Following a January 2019 transfer window with no signings at all and serious tensions within the board, Clive Richardson (chairman) and John Treacy (director) both resigned from the club with immediate effect on 4 February 2019, citing that the full nature of the serious financial situation at the club had not been fully disclosed to them at the time of their purchase. Days later, the club was acquired for a nominal fee by Daniela De Angeli (former managing director from the Zamparini days) and Rino Foschi (appointed as chairman), only for them to sell it again to hotel and tourism company Arkus Network S.r.l. later in May. The new owner, Sporting Network S.r.l., subscribed a €5 million capital increase to the club.

At the end of the 2018–19 Serie B, Palermo finished in third place with 63 points but was demoted by FIGC to last place in Serie B on 13 May due to serious financial irregularities, which meant relegation to Serie C for the following season. The club appealed to FIGC against this ruling and was successful in having the penalty revised; rather than automatic demotion, the club was merely docked 20 points instead, which consequently placed them in a comfortable mid-table eleventh position. However, on 24 June 2019, Palermo incorrectly submitted to FIGC their standard application for the following 2019–20 Serie B season, by failing to provide evidence of a valid insurance policy for the new season. A club trading with no insurance is a severe breach of Italian company law, and as such FIGC had no alternative but to formally exclude the club not only from Serie B, but indeed all professional leagues, on 12 July 2019.

=== A fresh start, City Football Group ownership (2019–present) ===
On 23 July 2019, in compliance of Article 52 of NOIF, Mayor of Palermo Leoluca Orlando confirmed six declarations of interests had been presented for a new phoenix club to be admitted in Serie D, the highest level of non-professional football in Italy, for the 2019–20 season. The next day, Orlando announced his choice of a bid by a company named "Hera Hora srl", jointly owned by entrepreneurs Dario Mirri (a Palermo native, and Renzo Barbera's nephew) and a Sicilian-American, Tony DiPiazza.

The new club, named Società Sportiva Dilettantistica Palermo, started with Rosario Pergolizzi (a former Palermo youth coach) as their first manager, and managed to keep Andrea Accardi from the previous Serie B campaign, as well as signing former Serie A and Palermo star Mario Santana. Palermo completed their Serie D campaign in first place, and was awarded promotion to Serie C by the Italian Football Federation after all the amateur leagues were stopped in March 2020 due to the global COVID-19 pandemic. On 16 July 2020, the club changed its name to Palermo Football Club.

Palermo, under the guidance of Silvio Baldini, concluded the 2021–22 Serie C campaign in third place in the Group C, behind Bari and Catanzaro, and then made it to the promotion playoff final against Padova after eliminating Triestina, Virtus Entella and Feralpisalò in the process (during playoffs, Renzo Barbera stadium was always sold out). On 12 June 2022, Palermo were promoted to Serie B after defeating Padova 2–0 on aggregate, thus returning to the Italian second division just three years after being excluded from the league. On 4 July 2022, in the presence of Manchester City F.C. CEO Ferran Soriano, the club was formally announced to have been acquired by City Football Group, a subsidiary of Abu Dhabi United Group, with outgoing owner Dario Mirri (who was confirmed as club chairman) keeping a 20% of the quotes.

Under new head coach Eugenio Corini, former Palermo captain in the 2000s, the Rosanero ended their season in ninth place, missing out on promotion playoffs in the season's final game. The follow-up season saw Palermo aiming for direct promotion; however, inconsistency in league performances led to the dismissal of Corini and the appointment of Michele Mignani as new head coach for the remainder of the campaign.

== Colours and badge ==
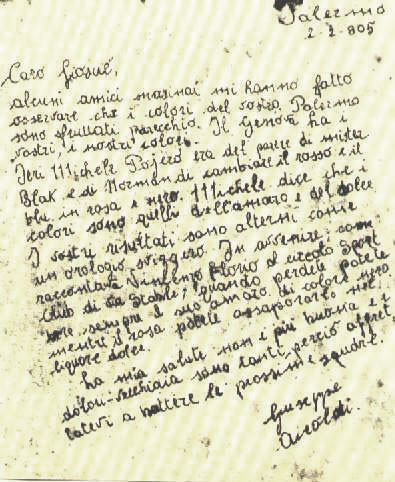
Airoldi's letter in which he suggests pink and black as the club's new official colours

Palermo's original red-blue kit, worn from 1900 until 1907.

The new official badge as of 2019 is a white eagle's head and three pink/black feathers within a black stylized letter 'P'. The eagle represents the city of Palermo, as it is also part of the city's official coat of arms. This new badge replaced the long-standing badge of the previous formation of the club, an escutcheon with an eagle poised for flight within it, and the previous official club denomination "U.S. Città di Palermo" in capital letters on the top.

From its foundation, Palermo originally played with a red and blue shirt as its official colours, but decided to switch to the unusual current choice of pink and black on 27 February 1907, contemporaneously with the change of denomination to "Palermo FootBall Club".

The colour choice of pink and black was suggested by Count Giuseppe Airoldi, a prominent founding member of the club. In a personal letter Airoldi wrote on 2 February 1905 to English club councillor Joseph Whitaker, he defined pink and black poetically as "colours of the bitter and the sweet", a choice he amusingly asserted to be suited for a team characterised by "results as up and down as a Swiss clock", noting also the fact that red and blue were a very commonly used choice of colours around Italy at the time.

The club had to wait for their new jerseys for three months, because no pink cotton flannel material was available in Palermo and the appointed tailoring company could only find suitable material from England and had to import it from there. The vivid new shirts were first worn in a friendly match against Sir Thomas Lipton's crew team; the match ended in a 2–1 win for Palermo. From 1936 to 1940, the team were forced to play in red and yellow jerseys due to an imposition by the fascist regime of Benito Mussolini (red and yellow being the official colours of the municipality of Palermo.) When the club was refounded in 1941 following a merger with Juventina Palermo, they started dressing in light blue shirts on the pitch, but switched back to the very popular pink and black only one year later.

=== Shirt sponsors and manufacturers ===
Period	Kit manufacturer	Shirt sponsor
1979–80	Pouchain	None
1981–82	NR	Vini Corvo
1983–84	NR	Pasta Ferrara
1985–86	NR	Juculano
1987–90	NR	Città di Palermo
1989–90	Hummel	Città di Palermo
1990–91	ABM	Città di Palermo
1991–92	ABM	Seleco
1992–93	ABM	Giornale di Sicilia
1993–94	ABM	Toka
1994–96	ABM	Provincia Regionale di Palermo
1996–97	Kappa	Giornale di Sicilia
1997–98	Kappa	Tomarchio Naturà
1998–99	Kappa	Palermo Provincia Turistica
1999–00	Kronos	Tele+
2000–01	Lotto	Alitalia
2001–02	Lotto	LTS
2002–06	Lotto	Provincia di Palermo
2006–08	Lotto	None
2008	Lotto	Pramac
2008–09	Lotto	None
2009–10	Lotto	Betshop
2010	Lotto	Eurobet
2010–11	Legea	Eurobet
2011–12	Legea	Eurobet & Burger King
2012–2013	Puma	Eurobet & Italiacom
2013–2014	Puma	Palermocalcio.it & Sigma
2014–2015	Joma	RosaneroCares & CBM
2015–2017	Joma	None
2017–2019	Legea	None
2019	Legea	Gruppo Arena c/o Super Conveniente
2019–2023	Kappa	Bisaten, Gruppo Arena, Nuova Sicilauto, Sicilgesso and Gagliano Gioielli
2023–2025	Puma	Old Wild West Restaurant, Bisaten & A29
2025–	Puma	Sicily by Car, Bisaten & InXaero

== Stadium ==
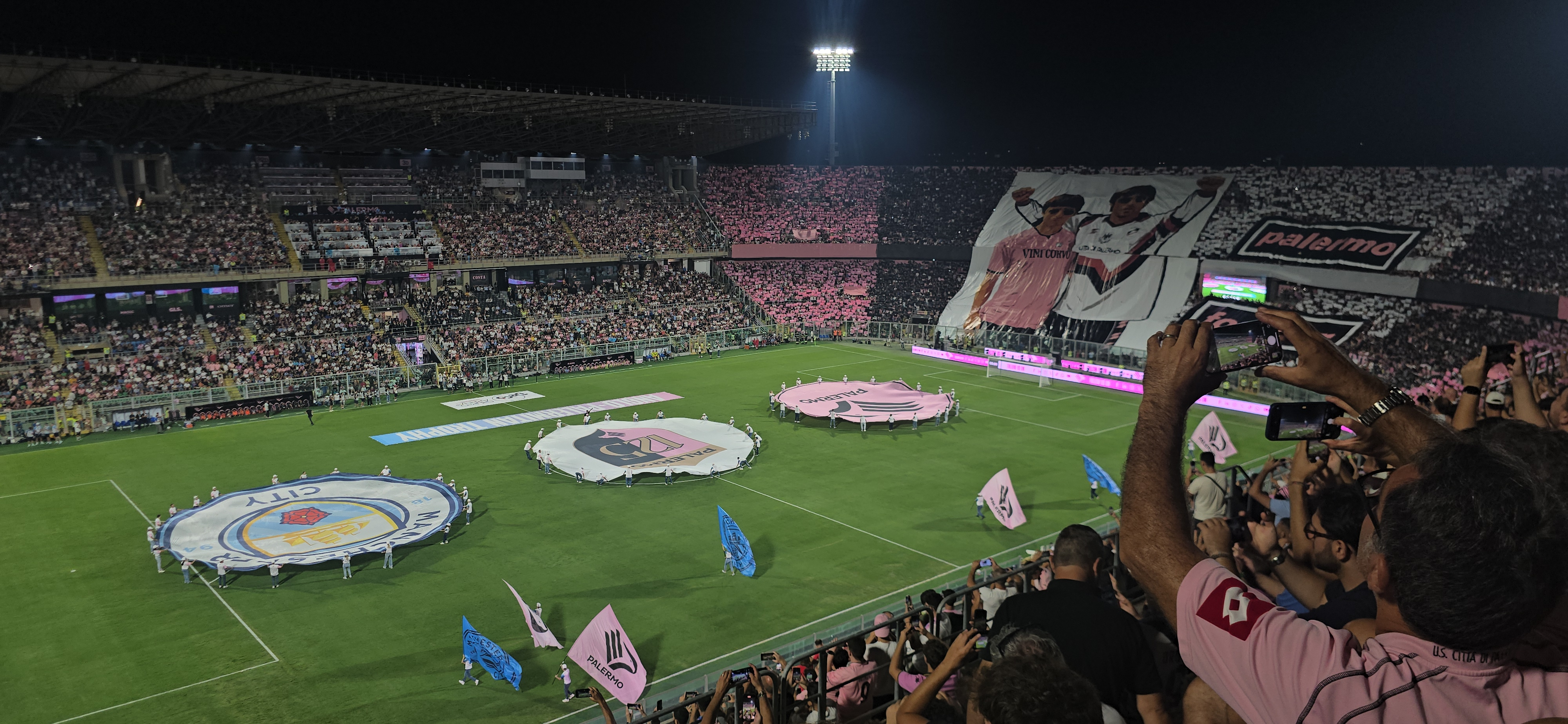
Stadio Renzo Barbera, Palermo

Palermo plays its home matches at Stadio Renzo Barbera. The stadium was opened in 1932, during the fascist regime, with the name Stadio Littorio (after the Italian name for the fasces symbol). The inaugural match, won by Palermo 5–1, was played on 24 January 1932 against Atalanta. In 1936, the Littorio was renamed Stadio Michele Marrone after a fascist soldier who died in the Spanish Civil War.

Initially, the stadium featured a running track and no spectator space behind the goals, only terraces and a stand along the side. In 1948, following the end of World War II and the fall of the fascist regime, the stadium was renamed Stadio La Favorita after the Favorita neighbourhood where it was located. It was also restructured to remove the running track and add two curved end sections, increasing its capacity to 30,000. In 1984, it was enlarged to 50,000. The new capacity was reached only twice: for a Serie C1 league match against Sicilian rivals Messina and a friendly match against Juventus. On the occasion of the 1990 FIFA World Cup, the stadium was renovated, some new seats added, but the overall capacity reduced to 37,619. During the 1989 renovation works, five employees died following the collapse of a section of the stadium. In 2002 the stadium was renamed in honour of Renzo Barbera, legendary Palermo chairman in the 1970s.

In 2007, Palermo chairman and owner Maurizio Zamparini announced plans to move the club to a new state-of-the-art stadium, possibly located in the ZEN neighbourhood of Palermo, not far from the Velodromo Paolo Borsellino, a smaller stadium that had previously hosted some Palermo matches.

In 2024, Palermo inaugurated their own training centre, located in the city of Torretta, their first one in the club's history.

== Supporters ==
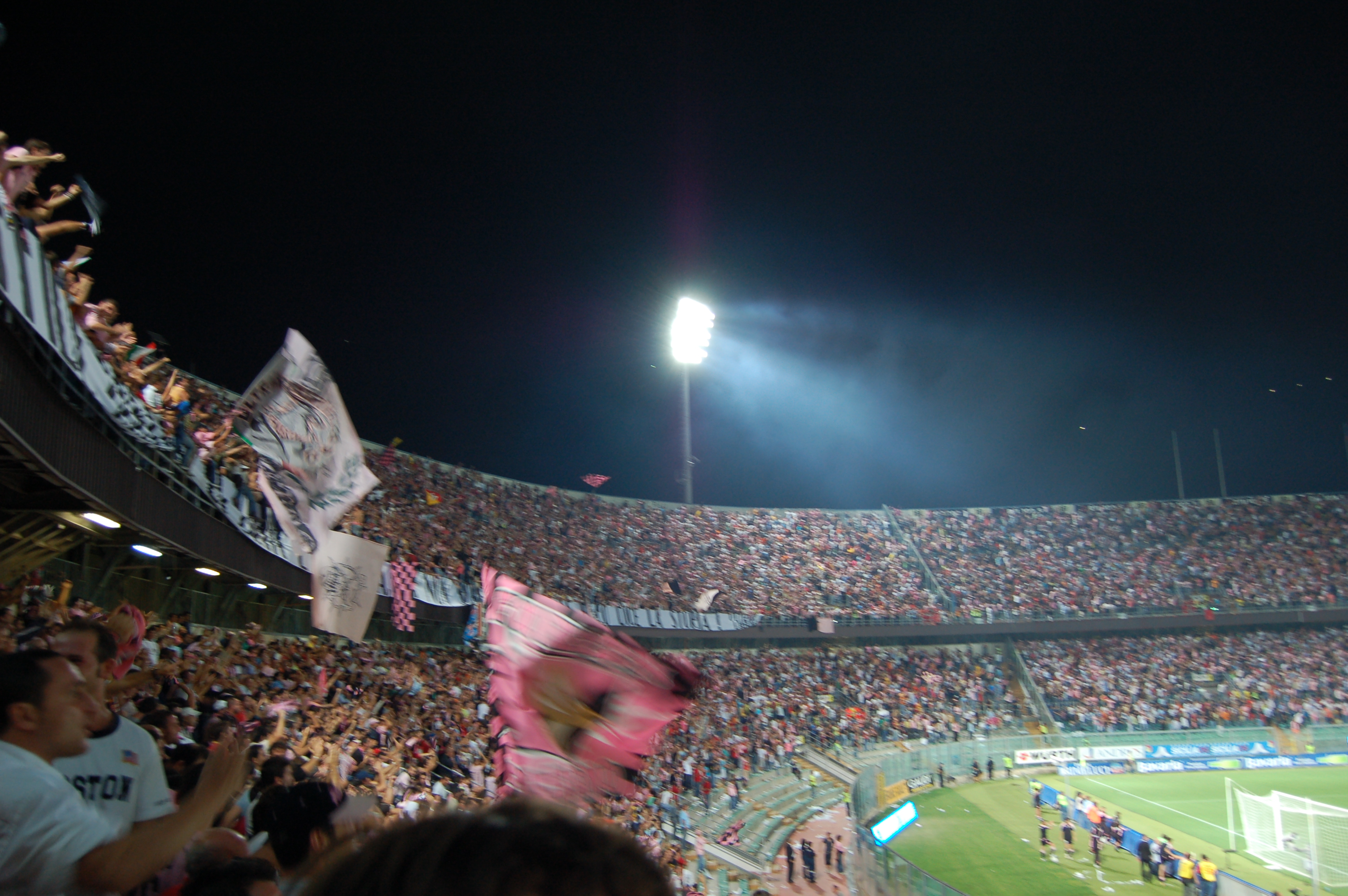
Palermo supporters in the 2006 Sicilian derby

The majority of Palermo supporters come from the city and its neighbourhood. However, Palermo is also widely popular throughout Western Sicily, as well as among Sicilian immigrants in northern Italy, For example, a number of Palermo fans living in and around the German city of Solingen have even founded a club named FC Rosaneri in honour of Palermo which, as of 2007, plays in the Kreisliga B league.

Support for Palermo is traditionally closely associated with a strong sense of Sicilian identity; indeed, it is not uncommon to see Sicilian flags waved by fans and ultras during Palermo matches. Palermo fans are also twinned with Lecce ultras. This friendship was strengthened by the acquisition of Fabrizio Miccoli, who is originally from the city of Lecce and a well-known Lecce supporter who went on to become captain of Palermo and also the club's most prolific player, setting records for: most Serie A league goals (74, from 2007 to 2013); most goals in all competitions (81, from 2007 to 2013); and most Serie A league appearances (165, from 2007 to 2013).

Palermo's biggest rivals are fellow islanders Catania. Matches between Palermo and Catania are usually referred to as Sicilian derbies, despite the existence of a third Sicilian team, Messina, who played in Serie A alongside Palermo and Catania in recent years. Rivalry with Messina, although historically older, is generally less intense than that with Catania.

The 2006–07 return match between Palermo and Catania, played on 2 February 2007 at Stadio Angelo Massimino, Catania, is remembered due to the death of policeman Filippo Raciti who was injured during riots between the local police and the Catania supporters.

According to a survey of 2008, the team has about 1.47 million fans domestically, placing it among the top ten best-supported Italian teams. For example, at the Coppa Italia final played in Rome on 29 May 2011 against Inter, which Palermo lost 3–1, it was estimated that there were 25,000 - 35,000 fans from Palermo, easily outnumbering the Nerazzurri fans present.

== Players ==
=== Current squad ===
As of 11 September 2026

Note: Flags indicate national team as defined under FIFA eligibility rules; some limited exceptions apply. Players may hold more than one non-FIFA nationality.

No.	Pos.	Nation	Player
1	GK	ITA	Mattia Perin
3	DF	ITA	Tommaso Augello
5	MF	ITA	Antonio Palumbo
6	MF	FRA	Claudio Gomes
7	MF	BRA	Gabriel Strefezza
8	MF	ITA	Jacopo Segre
9	FW	ITA	Dominic Vavassori (on loan from Atalanta)
10	MF	ITA	Filippo Ranocchia
11	MF	GHA	Emanuel Gyasi
12	GK	ITA	Manfredi Nespola
13	DF	ITA	Mattia Bani
14	GK	ITA	Mattia Fortin (on loan from Lens)
17	FW	NOR	Dennis Johnsen

No.	Pos.	Nation	Player
20	FW	FIN	Joel Pohjanpalo
23	MF	BRA	Hernani
24	MF	ARG	Nahuel Estévez
27	DF	ITA	Niccolò Pierozzi
29	DF	POL	Patryk Peda
32	DF	ITA	Pietro Ceccaroni
33	DF	ITA	Andrea Bozzolan (on loan from Reggiana)
36	MF	ITA	Luca Mazzitelli
66	GK	FIN	Jesse Joronen
84	DF	ITA	Tommaso Cassandro
93	DF	ITA	Federico Barba
96	DF	ITA	Giangiacomo Magnani
99	FW	ITA	Alessandro Gabrielloni (on loan from Como)

=== Out on loan ===
Note: Flags indicate national team as defined under FIFA eligibility rules; some limited exceptions apply. Players may hold more than one non-FIFA nationality.

No.	Pos.	Nation	Player
—	GK	ITA	Francesco Cutrona (at Costa Orientale Sarda until 30 June 2027)
—	GK	ITA	Sebastiano Desplanches (at Frosinone until 30 June 2027)
—	GK	ITA	Francesco Di Bartolo (at Team Altamura until 30 June 2027)
—	DF	MLI	Salim Diakité (at Zulte Waregem until 30 June 2027)
—	DF	GRE	Dimitrios Nikolaou (at OFI until 30 June 2027)

No.	Pos.	Nation	Player
—	MF	SRB	Aljoša Vasić (at Südtirol until 30 June 2027)
—	FW	FRA	Stredair Appuah (at Lommel until 30 June 2027)
—	FW	ITA	Giacomo Corona (at Virtus Entella until 30 June 2027)
—	FW	FRA	Jérémy Le Douaron (at Troyes until 30 June 2027)

=== Former players ===
In 2020, as part of the club's 120th anniversary celebrations, Palermo announced a hall of fame selection, with eleven players and a manager selected from a list of over 100 proposals.

The most voted players were:

- (Italy) Fabrizio Miccoli; 4183 votes
- (Brazil) George Martins; 3924 votes
- (Argentina) Javier Pastore; 3835 votes
- (Italy) Federico Balzaretti; 3738 votes
- (Italy) Andrea Barzagli; 3495 votes
- (Slovenia) Josip Iličić; 2801 votes
- (Argentina) Paulo Dybala; 2798 votes
- (Italy) Luca Toni; 2700 votes
- (Italy) Fabio Grosso; 2575 votes
- (Italy) Francesco Guidolin; 2516 votes
- (Italy) Amauri; 2292 votes
- (Uruguay) Edinson Cavani; 1702 votes
- (Italy) Stefano Sorrentino; 1583 votes
- (Italy) Roberto Biffi; 1566 votes
- (Italy) Lamberto Zauli; 1490 votes

== Club officials ==
=== Board of directors ===
As of 3 July 2025

Role	Name
President	(Italy) Dario Mirri
Managing director & CEO	(Italy) Giovanni Gardini
Board members	(England) Simon Richard Cliff (Italy) Alberto Galassi (England) Theodore Macbeath (England) Brian Marwood
Sporting director	(Italy) Carlo Osti
Head of scout	(Italy) Leonardo Masieri
Scout	(Italy) Simone Lo Schiavo
Academy director	(Italy) Giuseppe Geria

=== Current technical staff ===
As of 17 June 2025

Role	Name
Head coach	(Italy) Filippo Inzaghi
Assistant coach	(Italy) Maurizio D'Angelo
Head of fitness coach	(Italy) Giuseppe Bellistri
Fitness coach	(Italy) Luca Alimonta (Italy) Daniele Cominotti (Italy) Guglielmo Pillitteri
Match analyst	(Italy) Simone Baggio (Italy) Federico Montalto
Goalkeeping coach	(Italy) Federico Orlandi (Italy) Michele Marotta
Technical collaborator	(Italy) Evans Soligo
Team manager	(Italy) Fabio Pinna
Health manager	(Italy) Roberto Matracia
Doctors	(Italy) Marco Bruzzone (Italy) Davide Lo Nardo
Rehab coach	(Italy) Domenico Giordano (Italy) Simone Sigillo
Head of physiotherapists	(Italy) Massimiliano Mereu
Physiotherapist	(Italy) Mirko Genzardi (Italy) Rosario Sciacchitano (Italy) Salvatore Di Paola
Nutritionist	(Italy) Clara Gabrielli
Kitman	(Italy) Pasquale Castellana (Italy) Giuseppe Caruso (Italy) Francesco Salerno (Italy) Gabriele Simone Trapani

== Managers ==
In 2020, as part of the celebrations for the club's 120th anniversary, Palermo announced a hall of fame selection, asking their supporters to select the best manager in the club's history among a list of successful ones from the past.

The best manager in the club's history was selected to be Francesco Guidolin, who led Palermo to win promotion to Serie A in 2004 after a 31-year absence, and sixth place in the top flight (best result in the club's history) and consequent first ever European qualification the year after.

Other candidates for all-time manager were (in order of votes):

- (Italy) Delio Rossi
- (Italy) Giuseppe Iachini
- (Italy) Ignazio Arcoleo
- (Czech Republic) Čestmír Vycpálek
- (Italy) Fernando Veneranda
- (Italy) Giuseppe Caramanno
- (Italy) Rosario Pergolizzi
- (Italy) Corrado Viciani
- (Italy) Carmelo Di Bella
- (Italy) Gipo Viani
- (Italy) Benigno De Grandi

== Chairmen history ==
Over the years Palermo has had various owners and chairmen; here is a chronological list of the known chairmen:

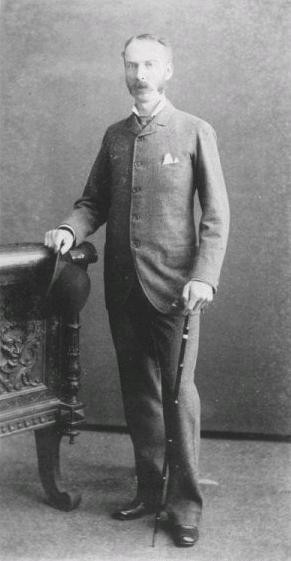
Joseph Whitaker, honorary chairman during the early 1900s

- (England) Edward De Garston (1900–1903)
- (Italy) Barone Michele Vannucci (1903–1904)
- (Italy) Cavaliere Ignazio Majo Pagano (1904–1908)
- (Italy) Barone Roberto Pottino (1908–1915)
- (Italy) Valentino Colombo (1920–1923)
- (Italy) Cavaliere Michele Utveggio (1923–1925)
- (Italy) Valentino Colombo (1925–1926)
- (Italy) Conte Liotta di Lemos (1928)
- (Italy) Barone Giovanni Sergio (1928)
- (Italy) Conte Guido Airoldi (1928–1929)
- (Italy) Barone Luigi Bordonaro di Gebbiarossa (1929–1931)
- (Italy) Francesco Paolo Barresi (1931–1933)
- (Italy) Cavaliere Giovanni Lo Casto Valenti (1933–1934)
- (Italy) Valentino Colombo (1934–1935)
- (Italy) Giovanni De Luca (1935)
- (Italy) Luigi Majo Pagano (1935–1936)
- (Italy) Valentino Colombo (1936–1937)
- (Italy) Paolo Di Pietra (1937–1938)
- (Italy) Salvatore Barbaro (1938–1940)
- (Italy) Duilio Lanni (1941–1942)
- (Italy) Giuseppe Agnello (1942–1947)
- (Italy) Stefano La Motta (1947–1948)
- (Italy) Giuseppe Guazzardella (1948–1951)
- (Italy) Raimondo Lanza di Trabia (1951–1952)
- (Italy) Barone Carlo La Lomia (1952–1953)
- (Italy) Mario Fasino (1953–1954)
- (Italy) Ernesto Pivetti (1954–1955)
- (Italy) Giuseppe Trapani (1955)
- (Italy) Conte Arturo Cassina (1955–1956)
- (Italy) Giuseppe Seminara (1956–1957)
- (Italy) Casimiro Vizzini (1957–1963)
- (Italy) Conte Guglielmo Pinzero (1963–1964)
- (Italy) Ernesto Di Fresco, (Italy) Luigi Barbaccia, (Italy) Franz Gorgone (1964)
- (Italy) Casimiro Vizzini (1964)
- (Italy) Conte Guglielmo Pinzero (1964)
- (Italy) Totò Vilardo (1964–1965)
- (Italy) Franco Spagnolo (1965)
- (Italy) Franz Gorgone (1965)
- (Italy) Luigi Gioia (1965)
- (Italy) Giuseppe Pergolizzi (1967–1970)
- (Italy) Renzo Barbera (1970–1980)
- (Italy) Gaspare Gambino (1980–1982)
- (Italy) Roberto Parisi (1982–1985)
- (Italy) Salvatore Matta (1985–1986)
- (Italy) Salvino Lagumina (1987–1989)
- (Italy) Giovanni Ferrara (1989–1993)
- (Italy) Liborio Polizzi (1993–1995)
- (Italy) Giovanni Ferrara (1995–2000)
- (Italy) Sergio D'Antoni (2000–2002)
- (Italy) Maurizio Zamparini (2002–2017)
- (United States) (Italy) Paul Baccaglini (2017)
- (Italy) Giovanni Giammarva (2017–2018)
- (England) Clive Richardson (2018–2019)
- (Italy) Rino Foschi (2019)
- (Italy) Alessandro Albanese (2019)
- (Italy) Dario Mirri (2019–)

== Honours ==
- Serie B
  - Champions (5): 1931–32, 1947–48, 1967–68, 2003–04, 2013–14
- Serie C1
  - Champions (4): 1941–42, 1945–46, 1992–93, 2000–01
- Serie C2
  - Champions (1): 1987–88
- Serie D
  - Champions (1): 2019–20
- Prima Divisione
  - Champions (1): 1929–30
- Coppa Italia Serie C
  - Winners (1): 1992–93

=== Other Titles ===
- Coppa Federale Siciliana

- Winners (1): 1920

- Whitaker Challenge Cup

- Winners (1): 1908

- Lipton Challenge Cup

- Winners (5): 1910, 1912, 1913, 1914, 1915

- Torneo di Tunisi
  - Winners (1): 1923
- Campionato Primavera:
  - Winners (1): 2008–09
- Campionato Nazionale Dante Berretti:
  - Winners (1): 2000–01
- Coppa Allievi Professionisti:
  - Winners (1): 1997–98
- Campionato Giovanissimi Regionali:
  - Winners (2): 2011–12, 2012–13

== Records ==
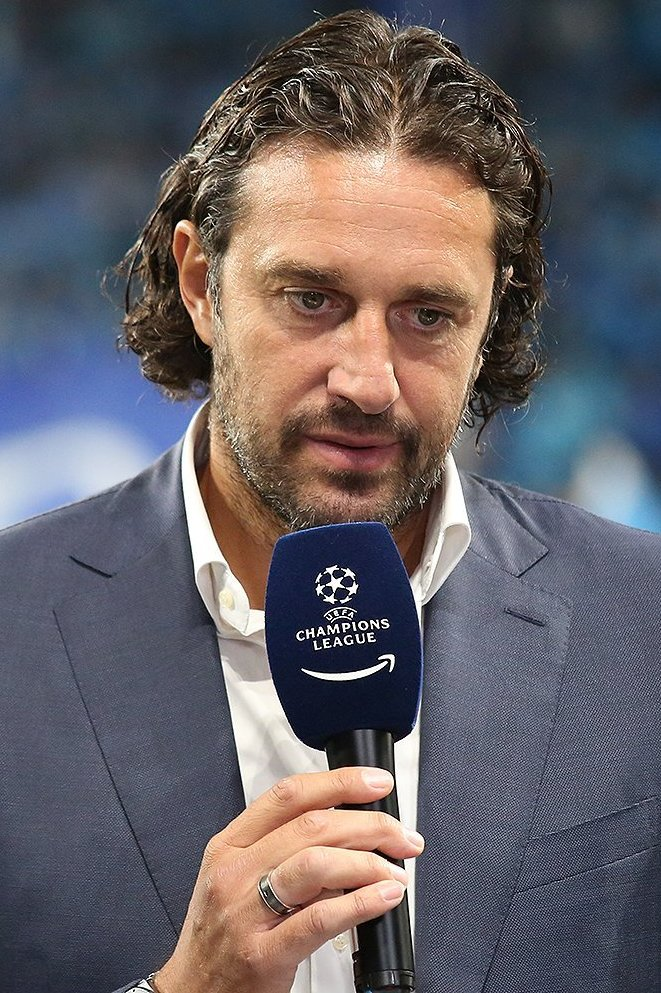
Italian striker Luca Toni holds the record for most goals in a single season with Palermo, scoring 30 times during the club's 2003–04 Serie B campaign

- Most appearances in all competitions – 373, Roberto Biffi (1988–1999)
- Most European appearances – 15, Andrea Barzagli, Franco Brienza and Mattia Cassani
- Most Serie A league appearances – 165, Fabrizio Miccoli (2007–2013)
- Most league goals – 74, Fabrizio Miccoli (2007–2013)
- Most Serie A league goals – 74, Fabrizio Miccoli (2007–2013)
- Most Serie B league goals – 44, Carlo Radice (1930–1932)
- Most Serie C/C1 league goals – 25, Matteo Brunori (2021–2022)
- Most Coppa Italia cup goals – 7, Massimo De Stefanis (1979–1984)
- Most Europa League/UEFA Cup goals – 4, Franco Brienza (2005–2007), Abel Hernández (2010–2011)
- Most goals in all competitions – 81, Fabrizio Miccoli (2007–2013)
- Most goals in a season – 30, Luca Toni (2003–2004)
- Current player with most appearances – 156, Matteo Brunori (as of 12 April 2025)
- Biggest win and biggest home win in Serie A – 8–0 (v. Pro Patria, 5 November 1950)
- Biggest away win – 8–1 (v. Potenza, 1 March 1942)
- Biggest defeat and biggest away defeat – 0–9 (v. Milan, 18 February 1951)
- Biggest home defeat – 0–7 (v. Udinese, 27 February 2011)
- Highest number of points in Serie A league – 65 pt. (2009–10) 5th position
- Best series without home defeats – 31 (Palermo–Vibonese 0–0, 10 April 2021 – Palermo–Perugia 2–0, 13 August 2022)
- Greatest series of consecutive victories in Serie A league – 5 (1961–62 and 2006–07)

== Competitions ==
=== League ===
Level	Category	Participations	Debut	Last season	Moves
A	Serie A	29	1932–33	2016–17	▼9
B	Serie B	50	1930–31	2025–26	▲9 ▼3 ✟ 3
C	Prima Divisione	1	1929–30		▲6
C	Serie C	3	1941–42	2021–22	▲6
C	Serie C1	9	1984–85	2000–01	▲6
C	Serie C2	1	1987–88		▲1
93 out of 95 years of professional football in Italy since 1929
D	Serie D	1	2019–2020		▲1

=== National cups ===
Competition	Participation	Debut	Last season
Coppa Italia	69	1935–36	2025–26
Coppa Italia Serie C	12	1984–85	2021–22
Supercoppa di Serie C	1	2000–01	2000–01

=== International competitions ===
Category	Participations	Debut	Last season
Europa League ex UEFA Cup	5	2005–06	2011–12
Mitropa Cup	2	1960	1968–69
Coppa delle Alpi	1	1960	1960

== In Europe ==
=== UEFA Cup / UEFA Europa League ===
Season	Round	Opposition	Home	Away	Aggregate	Reference
2005–06	First round	(Cyprus) Anorthosis	2–1	4–0	6–1	
2005–06	Group B	(Israel) Maccabi Petah Tikva	—N/a	2–1	1st	
2005–06	Group B	(Russia) Lokomotiv Moscow	0–0	—N/a	1st	
2005–06	Group B	(Spain) Espanyol	—N/a	1–1	1st	
2005–06	Group B	(Denmark) Brøndby	3–0	—N/a	1st	
2005–06	Round of 32	(Czech Republic) Slavia Prague	1–0	1–2	2–2 (a)	
2005–06	Round of 16	(Germany) Schalke 04	1–0	0–3	1–3	
2006–07	First round	(England) West Ham United	3–0	1–0	4–0	
2006–07	Group H	(Germany) Eintracht Frankfurt	—N/a	2–1	4th	
2006–07	Group H	(England) Newcastle United	0–1	—N/a	4th	
2006–07	Group H	(Turkey) Fenerbahçe	—N/a	0–3	4th	
2006–07	Group H	(Spain) Celta Vigo	1–1	—N/a	4th	
2007–08	First round	(Czech Republic) Mladá Boleslav	0–1 (a.e.t.)	1–0	1–1 (2–4 p)	
2010–11	Play-off round	(Slovenia) Maribor	3–0	2–3	5–3	
2010–11	Group F	(Czech Republic) Sparta Prague	2–2	2–3	3rd	
2010–11	Group F	(Switzerland) Lausanne-Sport	1–0	1–0	3rd	
2010–11	Group F	(Russia) CSKA Moscow	0–3	1–3	3rd	
2011–12	Third qualifying round	(Switzerland) Thun	2–2	1–1	3–3 (a)	

== Bibliography ==
- Del Tappo, Luca; Mazzola, Calogero (2005). Il Palermo. Saggio sociologico-sportivo (in Italian) (III ed.). Palermo: Edizioni il foglio. p. 313.
- Tarantino, Giovanni; Paterna, Massimiliano (2014). Una storia in rosa e nero. La maglia del Palermo, i colori di una città (in Italian). Palermo: il Palindromo. p. 105. ISBN 9788898447077.
- Prestigiacomo, Vincenzo; Bagnati, Giuseppe; Maggio, Vito (2001). Il Palermo: una storia di cento anni (in Italian). Palermo: Corrado Rappa. p. 232.
- Prestigiacomo, Vincenzo; Bagnati, Giuseppe; Maggio, Vito (2004). Il Palermo racconta: storie, confessioni e leggende rosanero (in Italian). Palermo: Grafill. p. 253. ISBN 88-8207-144-8.
- Giordano, Giovanni; Brandaleone, Carlo (1982). Calcio Palermo: gli ottantaquattro anni di storia della societa rosanero (in Italian). Palermo: Giada. p. 432. ISBN 88-8207-144-8.
- Ginex, Roberto; Gueli, Roberto (1996). Breve storia del grande Palermo (in Italian). Rome: Newton. p. 66. ISBN 88-8183-361-1.
