= Maurizio Zamparini =

Italian businessman (1941–2022)

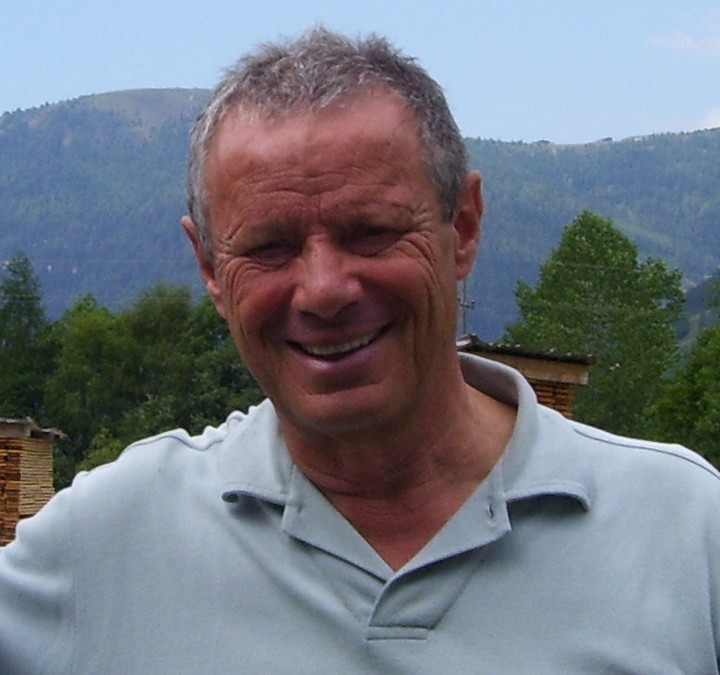
- Zamparini in 2007
- Born: 9 June 1941; Sevegliano, Italy
- Died: 1 February 2022 (aged 80); Cotignola, Italy
- Occupation: Businessman
- Known for: Former owner of Palermo
- Spouse: Laura Giordani
- Children: 5

Maurizio Zamparini (9 June 1941 – 1 February 2022) was an Italian businessman. He was the owner and director of the football club Palermo between July 2002 and February 2017 and from July 2017 to December 2018.

== Biography ==
Zamparini had business interests in several fields, with Emmezeta department stores being the most important one. He entered into football in 1987, after having bought then-Serie C2 club Venezia, saving it from possible bankruptcy. His investments in the football club led Venezia to reach Serie A in a few years. He sold Venezia in 2002 in order to buy then-Serie B club Palermo from Roma chairman Franco Sensi with the goal to bring the Sicilian team back to Serie A, a goal that was achieved with promotion in the 2003–04 season.

In April 2012, Zamparini was suspended for one year for involvement in third-party ownership; however, this was shortened to five months after appeal.

On 27 February 2017, Zamparini stepped down as chairman of Palermo after 15 years in charge with over 40 managerial changes (the last one being the appointment of Diego López as head coach in place of resigning Eugenio Corini a month previous), announcing he had formally sold his controlling stake to an unspecified Anglo-American fund. On 4 July 2017, Paul Baccaglini resigned as Palermo chairman, falling back into the hands of Zamparini, after the necessary funds were not in place. Zamparini had declared that he would not seek the place of chairman after Baccaglini's resignation. He became a member of the board of directors of the club, with a vacant chairman position. Giovanni Giammarva was later appointed chairman in November 2017. On 1 December 2018, Zamparini confirmed the sale of the club to an unnamed London company for the "symbolic" price of €10 (£8.75).

He died from complications of peritonitis in Cotignola on 1 February 2022 at the age of 80.
