= 2003–04 US Città di Palermo season =

U.S. Città di Palermo
2003-04 season
- President: Maurizio Zamparini
- Manager: Silvio Baldini (Until 26 January 2004); Francesco Guidolin
- Serie B: 1º (promoted to Serie A)
- Coppa Italia: Eightfinals
- Top goalscorer: League: Luca Toni (30); All: Toni (30)
Home colours	Away colours	Third colours

U.S. Città di Palermo played the season 2003-04 in the Serie B league and Coppa Italia.

== Summary ==
Ambitious Palermo, for the first time since 1973, failed to gain promotion to Serie A in the previous season following a 3–0 away defeat in the final match against Lecce, which were promoted at Palermo's place. That dramatic defeat was also the last appearance in his playing career for team captain Antonino Asta, who seriously injured during the match and did not manage to recover; he was part of the first team squad in the season 2003–04, without however making a single appearance. Following the events, Palermo made a number of prominent signings in the summer market, such as Eugenio Corini, Andrea Gasbarroni and Luca Toni; in addition, Palermo-born star Gaetano Vasari agreed to join the rosanero with a salary based on the number of appearances he would have made in the season. Silvio Baldini was appointed as new boss to replace Nedo Sonetti. Several football pundits suggested Palermo to be the real favourite team to win the Serie B league because of the quality of its roster.

The team made a very impressive start by defeating Gianfranco Zola's Cagliari Calcio, and managed to be always in the promotion spots. However, following a surprising 3–1 home defeat to Salernitana that brought Palermo down to third place, Baldini heavily criticized club chairman Maurizio Zamparini who consequently fired him and appointed Francesco Guidolin at his place. On the last day of the January transfer market, three new notable signings were made: Antonio Filippini, Emanuele Filippini and Fabio Grosso. Palermo later returned to top the table and eventually won the league, ending with the same points than Cagliari, but being crowned as Serie B champions due to head-to-head matches and promoted to Serie A after 31 years in the lower divisions.

== Squad ==
Note: Flags indicate national team as defined under FIFA eligibility rules; some limited exceptions apply. Players may hold more than one non-FIFA nationality.

No.	Pos.	Nation	Player
1	GK	ITA	Gianluca Berti
2	DF	ITA	Paolo Cotroneo
3	DF	ITA	Francesco Modesto
4	DF	ITA	Gianluca Atzori
5	MF	ITA	Eugenio Corini
6	DF	ITA	Christian Terlizzi
7	MF	ITA	Gaetano Vasari
8	MF	ITA	Daniele Di Donato
9	FW	ITA	Luca Toni
10	MF	ITA	Lamberto Zauli
11	MF	ITA	Salvatore Masiello
12	GK	ITA	Nicola Santoni
13	DF	ITA	Pietro Accardi
14	MF	CMR	Frank Oliver Ongfiang
14	DF	ITA	Rocco D'Aiello
16	FW	ITA	Pietro Balistreri
17	FW	ITA	Antonino Asta
18	FW	ITA	Franco Brienza
18	DF	ITA	Fabio Grosso
19	DF	ITA	Daniele Zito

No.	Pos.	Nation	Player
20	FW	ITA	Simone Pepe
21	MF	ROU	Paul Codrea
21	DF	ITA	Giuseppe Biava
22	MF	ITA	Massimo Mutarelli
23	MF	ITA	Ighli Vannucchi
23	MF	ITA	Emanuele Filippini
24	FW	NGA	John Olufemi
25	DF	SLE	Kewullay Conteh
26	MF	ITA	Antonio Filippini
27	MF	ITA	Michele Trionfante
29	DF	ROU	Valentin Năstase
30	FW	BRA	Jeda
32	MF	ITA	Marco Fina
46	MF	ITA	Andrea Gasbarroni
51	MF	ITA	Vincenzo Giannusa
79	MF	ITA	Evans Soligo
81	DF	ITA	Michele Ferri
82	MF	ITA	Nicola Milano
84	GK	ITA	Paolo Comi

=== Transfers ===
In
Pos.	Name	from	Type
GK	Gianluca Berti	Empoli	
GK	Paolo Comi	Monza	
DF	Michele Ferri	A.C. Milan	
DF	Gianluca Atzori	Empoli	
DF	Christian Terlizzi	Cesena	
MF	Evans Soligo	Venezia	
MF	Ighli Vannucchi	Empoli	
MF	Andrea Gasbarroni	Juventus	
MF	Eugenio Corini	Chievo Verona	
MF	Gaetano Vasari	Cesena	
FW	Simone Pepe	A.S. Roma	
FW	Franco Brienza	Ascoli	loan ended
FW	Luca Toni	Brescia Calcio	

Out
Pos.	Name	To	Type
GK	Vincenzo Sicignano	Parma	
DF	Alessandro Lucarelli	Fiorentina	
DF	Oscar Brevi	Ascoli	
DF	Matteo Pivotto	Modena	
DF	Leandro Rinaudo	Salernitana	loan
MF	Valentino Lai	Salernitana	loan
MF	Manolo Pestrin	Cesena	
MF	Frank Oliver Ongfiang	Cesena	
FW	Filippo Maniero	Brescia Calcio	
FW	Cristian La Grottería	Padova	

==== Winter ====
In

18	DF	ITA	Fabio Grosso (from Perugia)
21	DF	ITA	Giuseppe Biava (from AlbinoLeffe)
23	MF	ITA	Emanuele Filippini (from Parma)
26	MF	ITA	Antonio Filippini (from Brescia)
30	FW	BRA	Jeda (from Vicenza)

Out

3	DF	ITA	Francesco Modesto (to Reggina)
18	MF	ITA	Franco Brienza (on loan to Perugia)
21	MF	ROU	Paul Codrea (on loan to Perugia)
23	MF	ITA	Ighli Vannucchi (to Empoli)

== Competitions ==
=== Serie B ===
==== League table ====
Pos	Team	Pld	W	D	L	GF	GA	GD	Pts	Promotion or relegation
1	Palermo (P, C)	46	22	17	7	75	39	+36	83	Promotion to Serie A
2	Cagliari (P)	46	23	14	9	80	51	+29	83	Promotion to Serie A
3	Livorno (P)	46	20	19	7	75	45	+30	79	Promotion to Serie A
4	Messina (P)	46	21	16	9	71	45	+26	79	Promotion to Serie A
5	Atalanta (P)	46	19	20	7	59	36	+23	77	Promotion to Serie A

Source: Almanacco Illustrato del Calcio - La Storia 1898-2004, Panini Edizioni, Modena, September 2005
Rules for classification: 1) points; 2) head-to-head points; 3) head-to-head goal difference; 4) head-to-head goals scored; 5) goal difference; 6) number of goals scored.
(C) Champions; (P) Promoted

==== Results by round ====
Round	1	2	3	4	5	6	7	8	9	10	11	12	13	14	15	16	17	18	19	20	21	22	23	24	25	26	27	28	29	30	31	32	33	34	35	36	37	38	39	40	41	42	43	44	45	46	47
Ground	H	A	H	A	H	A	H	A	H	H	A	H	A	A	H	A	H	A	H	A	H	A	H	A	H	A	A	H	A	H	H	A	H	A													
Result	P	D	W	W	D	L	W	D	W	W	D	W	D	W	W	D	W	D	W	D	D	L	W	L	L	D	D	L	D	W	W	W	L	W	W	D	W	D	L	W	W	D	W	D	W	D	W
Position	-	7	3	1	5	7	5	7	3	3	3	3	2	2	2	2	1	2	2	2	2	2	1	3	3	3	3	3	3	2	2	1	1	1	1	1	1	1	1	1	1	1	1	1	1	1	1

Source: Competitive matches
A = Away; H = Home; W = Win; D = Draw; L = Loss; P = Postponed; = Leader, Serie A; = 2004–05 Serie A; = Promotion playoff to 2004–05 Serie A

==== Matches ====
11 September 2003 3	Avellino	0–0	Palermo	Avellino
20:30		Report		Stadium: Partenio; Referee: Bergonzi

14 September 2003 4	Palermo	1–0	Cagliari Calcio	Palermo
20:30	Corini 53' (pen.)	Report		Stadium: Renzo Barbera; Referee: Nucini

20 September 2003 5	Palermo	2–1	Ternana Calcio	Palermo
20:30	Brienza 14'; Mutarelli 83'	Report	92' Kharja	Stadium: Renzo Barbera; Referee: Rosetti

23 September 2003 1	Salernitana	1–1	Palermo	Salerno
20:30	Tulli 49'	Report	94' Gasbarroni	Stadium: Stadio Arechi; Referee: Girardi
Note: Match rescheduled from 23 August 2003 due to issues against the expansion of Serie B to 24 squads.

27 September 2003 6	Torino	2–1	Palermo	Turin
20:30	Ferrante 24' (pen.), 43'	Report	59' (pen.) Corini	Stadium: Delle Alpi; Referee: Trefoloni

4 October 2003 7	Palermo	2–1	Delfino Pescara	Palermo
20:30	Corini 11' (pen.); Pepe 85'	Report	55' (o.g.) Di Donato	Stadium: Renzo Barbera; Referee: Bolognino

8 October 2003 2	Palermo	1–1	Piacenza Calcio	Palermo
20:30	Toni 64'	Report	90' Beghetto	Stadium: Renzo Barbera; Referee: Cruciani
Note: Match rescheduled from 7 September 2003 due to issues against the expansion of Serie B to 24 squads.

12 October 2003 8	Como Calcio	0–1	Palermo	Como
15:00		Report	57' (pen.) Corini	Stadium: Giuseppe Sinigaglia; Referee: Gabriele

15 October 2003 9	Palermo	2–0	Fiorentina	Palermo
20:30	Corini 29' (pen.); Di Donato 33'	Report		Stadium: Renzo Barbera; Referee: Dondarini

18 October 2003 10	Venezia F.C.	1–1	Palermo	Venice
20:30	Liendo 77'	Report	94' Toni	Stadium: Penzo; Referee: Rizzoli

25 October 2003 11	Ascoli Calcio	1–2	Palermo	Ascoli Piceno
20:30	Bonfiglio 29'	Report	28' Toni; 56' Mutarelli	Stadium: Stadio Cino e Lillo Del Duca; Referee: De Santis

2 November 2003 12	Palermo	0–0	Atalanta B.C.	Palermo
15:00		Report		Stadium: Renzo Barbera; Referee: Gabriele

9 November 2003 13	Catania Calcio	0–2	Palermo	Catania
15:00		Report	7' (pen.) Corini; 65' Zauli	Stadium: Massimino; Referee: Paparesta

16 November 2003 14	Palermo	4–0	S.S.C. Napoli	Palermo
15:00	Ferri 27'; Toni 37', 60'; Zauli 48'	Report		Stadium: Renzo Barbera; Referee: Racalbuto

20 November 2003 15	Treviso	1–1	Palermo	Treviso
20:30	Centurioni 50'	Report	92' Corini	Stadium: Tenni; Referee: Rodomonti

23 November 2003 16	Palermo	3–1	Hellas Verona	Palermo
15:00	Toni 27', 52', 72'	Report	23' Papa Waigo	Stadium: Renzo Barbera; Referee: Palanca

28 November 2003 17	Genoa C.F.C.	1–1	Palermo	Genoa
20:30	Colacone 56'	Report	79' Corini	Stadium: Luigi Ferraris; Referee: Racalbuto

7 December 2003 18	Palermo	2–1	U.C. Albinoleffe	Palermo
15:00	Toni 14'; Di Donato 39'	Report	30' Biava	Stadium: Renzo Barbera; Referee: Romeo

14 December 2003 19	Vicenza Calcio	0–0	Palermo	Vicenza
15:00		Report		Stadium: Romeo Menti; Referee: Rizzoli

21 December 2003 20	Palermo	0–0	Messina	Palermo
15:00		Report		Stadium: Renzo Barbera; Referee: De Santis

6 January 2004 21	Triestina Calcio	1–0	Palermo	Trieste
15:00	Moscardelli 82'	Report		Stadium: Nereo Rocco; Referee: Tombolini

11 January 2004 22	Palermo	4–1	Livorno	Palermo
15:00	Zauli 22', 71'; Toni 49', 84'	Report	48' C.Lucarelli	Stadium: Renzo Barbera; Referee: Brighi

18 January 2004 23	A.S. Bari	2–1	Palermo	Bari
15:00	Cordova 29' (pen.); De Rosa 41'	Report	35' Corini	Stadium: San Nicola; Referee: Collina

25 January 2004 24	Palermo	0–2	Salernitana	Palermo
15:00		Report	59', 84' Bogdani	Stadium: Renzo Barbera; Referee: De Marco

2 February 2004 25	Piacenza Calcio	2–2	Palermo	Piacenza
20:30	Lucenti 42'; Beghetto 89'	Report	49' Toni; 81' Nastase	Stadium: Garilli; Referee: Paparesta

8 February 2004 26	Palermo	1–1	Avellino	Palermo
15:00	Toni 42'	Report	70' Stroppa	Stadium: Renzo Barbera; Referee: Brighi

15 February 2004 27	Cagliari Calcio	3–2	Palermo	Cagliari
15:00	Abeijon 42'; E.Filippini 79' (o.g.); Langella 87'	Report	49', 67' Gasbarroni	Stadium: Sant'Elia; Referee: Ayroldi

22 February 2004 28	Ternana Calcio	1–1	Palermo	Terni
15:00	Zampagna 41'	Report	8' Toni	Stadium: Liberati; Referee: Rizzoli

29 February 2004 29	Palermo	2–1	Torino	Palermo
15:00	Gasbarroni 39'; Jeda 40'	Report	8' Tiribocchi	Stadium: Renzo Barbera; Referee: Racalbuto

4 March 2004 30	Delfino Pescara	0–2	Palermo	Pescara
20:30		Report	5' Toni; 77' Jeda	Stadium: Adriatico; Referee: Girardi

7 March 2004 31	Palermo	2–1	Como Calcio	Palermo
15:00	Toni 71'; Corini 89' (pen.)	Report	83' De Francesco	Stadium: Renzo Barbera; Referee: Rizzoli

12 March 2004 32	Fiorentina	2–1	Palermo	Florence
20:30	Di Livio 34'; Vryzas 92'	Report	20' Toni	Stadium: Artemio Franchi; Referee: Bolognino

18 March 2004 33	Palermo	4–0	Venezia F.C.	Palermo
20:30	Toni 20', 82'; E.Filippini 39'; Gasbarroni 61'	Report		Stadium: Renzo Barbera; Referee: De Marco

21 March 2004 34	Palermo	1–0	Ascoli Calcio	Palermo
15:00	Corini 50' (pen.)	Report		Stadium: Renzo Barbera; Referee: Rizzoli

28 March 2004 35	Atalanta B.C.	0–0	Palermo	Bergamo
20:30		Report		Stadium: Atleti Azzurri d'Italia; Referee: De Santis

4 April 2004 36	Palermo	5–0	Catania Calcio	Palermo
15:00	A.Filippini 7'; Biava 30'; Toni 57', 73' (pen.); E.Filippini 70'	Report		Stadium: Renzo Barbera; Referee: Messina

10 April 2004 37	S.S.C. Napoli	1–1	Palermo	Naples
15:00	Dionigi 28'	Report	40' A.Filippini	Stadium: San Paolo; Referee: Rodomonti

17 April 2004 38	Palermo	2–3	Treviso	Palermo
20:30	Corini 31' (pen.); Jeda 43'	Report	19' A.D'Agostino; 61' Bianco; 81' Ganci	Stadium: Renzo Barbera; Referee: De Santis

23 April 2004 39	Hellas Verona	1–2	Palermo	Verona
20:30	Adailton 11'	Report	28', 88' Toni	Stadium: Marcantonio Bentegodi; Referee: Rizzoli

1 May 2004 40	Palermo	3–1	Genoa C.F.C.	Palermo
20:30	Toni 5', 52'; E.Filippini 44'	Report	72' Milito	Stadium: Renzo Barbera; Referee: Ayroldi

8 May 2004 41	U.C. Albinoleffe	1–1	Palermo	Bergamo
20:30	Raimondi 81'	Report	59' Biava	Stadium: Atleti Azzurri d'Italia; Referee: Tombolini

15 May 2004 42	Palermo	3–0	Vicenza Calcio	Palermo
20:30	Gasbarroni 10'; Toni 25'; Di Donato 65'	Report		Stadium: Renzo Barbera; Referee: Pellegrino

22 May 2004 43	Messina	1–1	Palermo	Messina
20:30	Sosa 80'	Report	75' Biava	Stadium: Giovanni Celeste; Referee: Rodomonti

29 May 2004 44	Palermo	3–1	Triestina Calcio	Palermo
20:30	Toni 31', 41'; E.Filippini 83'		63' Mantovani	Stadium: Renzo Barbera; Referee: Dondarini

5 June 2004 45	Livorno	1–1	Palermo	Livorno
20:30	C.Lucarelli 71'	Report	69' Toni	Stadium: Stadio Armando Picchi; Referee: Saccani

12 June 2004 46	Palermo	3–0	A.S. Bari	Palermo
20:30	Toni 31'; Grosso 45+1'; Vasari 89'	Report		Stadium: Renzo Barbera; Referee: Farina

== Statistics ==
=== Players statistics ===
No.	Pos	Nat	Player	Total		Serie B		Coppa Italia	
No.	Pos	Nat	Player	Apps	Goals	Apps	Goals	Apps	Goals
1	GK	(Italy) ITA	Gianluca Berti	43	-35	42	-35	1	0
18	DF	(Italy) ITA	Fabio Grosso	21	1	21	1	0	0
13	DF	(Italy) ITA	Pietro Accardi	35	0	31+1	0	3	0
25	DF	(Sierra Leone) SLE	Kewullay Conteh	34	0	31+1	0	2	0
81	DF	(Italy) ITA	Michele Ferri	39	2	35+1	1	3	1
8	MF	(Italy) ITA	Daniele Di Donato	39	3	28+11	3	0	0
26	MF	(Italy) ITA	Antonio Filippini	21	2	20+1	2	0	0
22	MF	(Italy) ITA	Massimo Mutarelli	44	2	41	2	3	0
5	MF	(Italy) ITA	Eugenio Corini	43	12	38+2	12	3	0
46	MF	(Italy) ITA	Andrea Gasbarroni	41	6	26+13	6	2	0
9	FW	(Italy) ITA	Luca Toni	47	30	45	30	2	0
12	GK	(Italy) ITA	Santoni	8	-10	4	-4	4	-6
21	DF	(Italy) ITA	Giuseppe Biava	19	3	19	3	0	0
23	MF	(Italy) ITA	Emanuele Filippini	20	4	18+2	4	0	0
10	MF	(Italy) ITA	Lamberto Zauli	24	4	17+4	4	3	0
4	DF	(Italy) ITA	Atzori	18	0	17	0	1	0
6	DF	(Italy) ITA	Terlizzi	15	0	12	0	3	0
11	MF	(Italy) ITA	Salvatore Masiello	22	0	9+9	0	4	0
29	DF	(Romania) ROU	Valentin Năstase	19	1	9+7	1	3	0
7	MF	(Italy) ITA	Gaetano Vasari	30	2	8+18	1	4	1
	MF	(Italy) ITA	Franco Brienza	18	1	8+10	1		
30	FW	(Brazil) BRA	Jeda	17	3	8+9	3	0	0
20	FW	(Italy) ITA	Simone Pepe	24	3	5+14	1	5	2
	MF	(Romania) ROU	Codrea	8	0	5+3	0		
79	MF	(Italy) ITA	Evans Soligo	13	1	3+6	0	4	1
	MF	(Italy) ITA	Ighli Vannucchi	8	0	3+5	0		
	DF	(Italy) ITA	Francesco Modesto	1	0	1	0		
84	GK	(Italy) ITA	Comi	0	0	0	0	0	0
17	MF	(Italy) ITA	Antonino Asta	0	0	0	0	0	0
82	MF	(Italy) ITA	Nicola Milano	1	0	0	0	1	0
24	FW	(Nigeria) NGA	John Otuagomah Olufemi	1	0	0	0	1	0

- Source: http://calcio-seriea.net/presenze/2003/2962/
