= List of Palermo FC seasons =

Graph of Palermo season-by-season placements from 1929–30 to 2009–10

This is a record of all seasons played by Palermo FC since 1929, including their seasonal performances in all major football competitions when notable.

== Key ==
- UC = UEFA Cup.
- CI = Coppa Italia.
- CIC = Coppa Italia Serie C.
- CID = Coppa Italia Serie D.

| Promoted | Relegated |

== Seasons ==
| Season | Div | Pos | League record | | | | | | | Other competitions | Other | Top scorer(s) | |
| | | | Pld | W | D | L | GF | GA | Pts | | | Player(s) | Goals |
|---|---|---|---|---|---|---|---|---|---|---|---|---|---|
| 1929–30 | Prima Divisione | 1st | 28 | 20 | 2 | 6 | 59 | 17 | 42 | | | Carlo Radice | 15 |
| 1930–31 | Serie B | 3rd | 34 | 18 | 8 | 8 | 54 | 31 | 44 | | | Carlo Radice | 16 |
| 1931–32 | Serie B | 1st | 34 | 21 | 8 | 5 | 80 | 35 | 50 | | | Carlo Radice | 27 |
| 1932–33 | Serie A | 12th | 34 | 11 | 7 | 16 | 28 | 58 | 29 | | | Giovanni Chiecchi | 8 |
| 1933–34 | Serie A | 12th | 34 | 10 | 9 | 15 | 39 | 51 | 29 | | | Aldo Borel | 12 |
| 1934–35 | Serie A | 7th | 30 | 9 | 11 | 10 | 27 | 34 | 29 | | | Coriolano Palumbo | 5 |
| 1935–36 | Serie A | 15th | 30 | 10 | 3 | 17 | 24 | 50 | 23 | | | Coriolano Palumbo | 5 |
| 1936–37 | Serie B | 7th | 30 | 9 | 12 | 9 | 43 | 32 | 30 | | | Oliviero Icardi | 18 |
| 1937–38 | Serie B | 7th | 32 | 15 | 5 | 12 | 46 | 43 | 35 | | | Umberto Di Falco Balilla Lombardi | 12 |
| 1938–39 | Serie B | 7th | 34 | 13 | 10 | 11 | 35 | 34 | 36 | | | Romolo Celant | 9 |
| 1939–40 | Serie B | 7th | 34 | 11 | 7 | 16 | 36 | 69 | 29 | | | Romolo Celant | 9 |
| 1940–41 | Club cancelled, did not play in any league | | | | | | | | | | | | |
| 1941–42 | Club cancelled, did not play in any league | | | | | | | | | | | | |
| 1942–43 | Serie B | 18th | 23 | 6 | 5 | 12 | 19 | 30 | 17 | | | ? | ? |
| 1943–44 | Leagues suspended due to World War II | | | | | | | | | | | | |
| 1944–45 | Leagues suspended due to World War II | | | | | | | | | | | | |
| 1945–46 | Serie A | 8th | 20 | 6 | 5 | 9 | 16 | 23 | 17 | | | Luigi Perugini | 5 |
| 1946–47 | Serie B/C | 8th | 32 | 10 | 9 | 12 | 35 | 35 | 31 | | | Balilla Lombardi | 9 |
| 1947–48 | Serie B/C | 1st | 34 | 19 | 8 | 7 | 66 | 30 | 46 | | | Aurelio Pavesi | 23 |
| 1948–49 | Serie A | 11th | 38 | 14 | 8 | 16 | 57 | 58 | 36 | | | Aurelio Pavesi | 13 |
| 1949–50 | Serie A | 14th | 38 | 13 | 7 | 18 | 47 | 64 | 33 | | | Dante Di Maso Čestmír Vycpálek | 10 |
| 1950–51 | Serie A | 10th | 38 | 14 | 6 | 18 | 59 | 67 | 34 | | | Dante Di Maso | 15 |
| 1951–52 | Serie A | 11th | 38 | 11 | 14 | 13 | 43 | 51 | 36 | | | Helge Bronée | 11 |
| 1952–53 | Serie A | 16th | 34 | 10 | 10 | 14 | 43 | 56 | 30 | | | Lorenzo Bettini Enrique Martegani | 8 |
| 1953–54 | Serie A | 17th | 34 | 9 | 8 | 17 | 37 | 59 | 26 | | | Enrique Martegani | 10 |
| 1954–55 | Serie B | 13th | 34 | 10 | 10 | 14 | 38 | 43 | 30 | | | Franco Maselli Angelo Turconi | 6 |
| 1955–56 | Serie B | 2nd | 34 | 17 | 13 | 4 | 41 | 34 | 47 | | | Franco Maselli | 7 |
| 1956–57 | Serie A | 18th | 34 | 7 | 8 | 19 | 32 | 66 | 22 | | | Santiago Vernazza | 11 |
| 1957–58 | Serie B | 6th | 34 | 12 | 13 | 9 | 36 | 35 | 37 | | | Santiago Vernazza | 12 |
| 1958–59 | Serie B | 2nd | 38 | 11 | 13 | 7 | 52 | 28 | 49 | | | Santiago Vernazza | 19 |
| 1959–60 | Serie A | 16th | 34 | 6 | 15 | 13 | 27 | 40 | 27 | | | Santiago Vernazza | 9 |
| 1960–61 | Serie B | 3rd | 38 | 13 | 20 | 5 | 46 | 27 | 46 | | | Eugenio Fantini | 14 |
| 1961–62 | Serie A | 8th | 34 | 13 | 9 | 12 | 30 | 35 | 35 | | | José Fernando Puglia | 10 |
| 1962–63 | Serie A | 18th | 34 | 5 | 10 | 19 | 18 | 54 | 20 | | | Rune Börjesson | 7 |
| 1963–64 | Serie B | 12th | 38 | 9 | 17 | 12 | 25 | 28 | 35 | | | Santino Maestri | 10 |
| 1964–65 | Serie B | 11th | 38 | 12 | 12 | 14 | 43 | 43 | 36 | | | Giorgio Tinazzi | 11 |
| 1965–66 | Serie B | 15th | 38 | 9 | 16 | 13 | 34 | 34 | 34 | | | Gaetano Troja | 12 |
| 1966–67 | Serie B | 9th | 38 | 12 | 14 | 12 | 34 | 26 | 38 | | | Silvino Bercellino | 13 |
| 1967–68 | Serie B | 1st | 40 | 18 | 16 | 6 | 40 | 23 | 52 | | | Silvino Bercellino Gilberto Perucconi | 9 |
| 1968–69 | Serie A | 11th | 30 | 7 | 11 | 12 | 21 | 32 | 25 | | | Sergio Pellizzaro | 10 |
| 1969–70 | Serie A | 15th | 30 | 5 | 10 | 15 | 23 | 45 | 20 | | | Sergio Pellizzaro Gaetano Troja | 6 |
| 1970–71 | Serie B | 13th | 38 | 8 | 21 | 9 | 33 | 33 | 37 | | | Silvino Bercellino Sergio Pellizzaro Gaetano Troja | 7 |
| 1971–72 | Serie B | 3rd | 38 | 17 | 14 | 7 | 35 | 22 | 48 | | | Enzo Ferrari | 12 |
| 1972–73 | Serie A | 15th | 30 | 3 | 11 | 16 | 13 | 41 | 17 | | | Arturo Ballabio | 3 |
| 1973–74 | Serie B | 7th | 38 | 9 | 21 | 8 | 35 | 42 | 39 | CI: runners-up | | Giacomo La Rosa | 15 |
| 1974–75 | Serie B | 5th | 38 | 13 | 17 | 8 | 31 | 25 | 43 | | | Giorgio Barbana | 7 |
| 1975–76 | Serie B | 11th | 38 | 11 | 6 | 11 | 34 | 35 | 38 | | | Guido Magherini | 11 |
| 1976–77 | Serie B | 13th | 38 | 8 | 17 | 13 | 29 | 41 | 33 | | | Sergio Magistrelli | 7 |
| 1977–78 | Serie B | 6th | 38 | 12 | 16 | 10 | 42 | 36 | 40 | | | Vito Chimenti | 16 |
| 1978–79 | Serie B | 7th | 38 | 11 | 19 | 9 | 38 | 34 | 41 | CI: runners-up | | Vito Chimenti | 13 |
| 1979–80 | Serie B | 10th | 38 | 12 | 14 | 12 | 29 | 35 | 38 | | | Fausto Silipo | 6 |
| 1980–81 | Serie B | 14th | 38 | 9 | 21 | 8 | 35 | 33 | 34 | | | Egidio Calloni | 11 |
| 1981–82 | Serie B | 6th | 38 | 15 | 12 | 11 | 52 | 42 | 42 | | | Gianni De Rosa | 19 |
| 1982–83 | Serie B | 15th | 38 | 11 | 12 | 15 | 36 | 46 | 34 | | | Gianni De Rosa | 10 |
| 1983–84 | Serie B | 17th | 38 | 9 | 16 | 13 | 30 | 32 | 34 | | | Massimo De Stefanis | 11 |
| 1984–85 | Serie C1/B | 2nd | 38 | 16 | 13 | 5 | 41 | 24 | 45 | | | Gabriele Messina | 15 |
| 1985–86 | Serie B | 16th | 38 | 7 | 20 | 11 | 27 | 35 | 34 | | | Orazio Sorbello | 9 |
| 1986–87 | Club cancelled, did not play in any league | | | | | | | | | | | | |
| 1987–88 | Serie C2/D | 1st | 34 | 19 | 11 | 4 | 57 | 21 | 49 | CIC: runners-up | | Claudio Casale | 13 |
| 1988–89 | Serie C1/B | 3rd | 34 | 11 | 18 | 5 | 31 | 19 | 40 | | | Gaetano Auteri | 11 |
| 1989–90 | Serie C1/B | 5th | 34 | 14 | 15 | 5 | 34 | 19 | 43 | CIC: runners-up | | Gaetano Musella | 11 |
| 1990–91 | Serie C1/B | 2nd | 34 | 15 | 13 | 6 | 40 | 24 | 43 | CIC: runners-up | | Giorgio Lunerti | 11 |
| 1991–92 | Serie B | 17th | 38 | 11 | 13 | 14 | 41 | 43 | 35 | | | Antonio Rizzolo | 11 |
| 1992–93 | Serie C1/B | 1st | 34 | 16 | 14 | 4 | 46 | 25 | 46 | CIC: winners | | Luca Cecconi | 14 |
| 1993–94 | Serie B | 14th | 38 | 12 | 12 | 14 | 32 | 38 | 36 | | | Antonio Soda | 8 |
| 1994–95 | Serie B | 12th | 38 | 10 | 14 | 14 | 33 | 35 | 44 | | | Salvatore Campilongo Pietro Maiellaro | 9 |
| 1995–96 | Serie B | 7th | 38 | 12 | 16 | 10 | 36 | 35 | 52 | CI: quarter-finals | | Gaetano Vasari | 10 |
| 1996–97 | Serie B | 19th | 38 | 6 | 17 | 15 | 40 | 55 | 35 | | | Giampaolo Saurini | 17 |
| 1997–98 | Serie C1/B | 14th | 34 | 8 | 13 | 13 | 32 | 37 | 37 | | | Lorenzo Scarafoni | 7 |
| 1998–99 | Serie C1/B | 2nd | 34 | 15 | 11 | 8 | 36 | 30 | 56 | | | Andrea D'Amblè Luca Puccinelli | 5 |
| 1999–2000 | Serie C1/B | 6th | 34 | 13 | 13 | 8 | 30 | 23 | 52 | | | Luca Lugnan | 6 |
| 2000–01 | Serie C1/B | 1st | 34 | 18 | 10 | 6 | 47 | 31 | 64 | | | Massimiliano Cappioli | 15 |
| 2001–02 | Serie B | 11th | 38 | 12 | 12 | 14 | 47 | 54 | 48 | | | Christian La Grotteria Stefano Guidoni | 11 |
| 2002–03 | Serie B | 6th | 38 | 15 | 13 | 10 | 45 | 42 | 58 | | | Filippo Maniero | 13 |
| 2003–04 | Serie B | 1st | 46 | 22 | 17 | 7 | 75 | 39 | 83 | | | Luca Toni | 30 |
| 2004–05 | Serie A | 6th | 38 | 12 | 17 | 9 | 48 | 44 | 53 | | | Luca Toni | 20 |
| 2005–06 | Serie A | 5th | 38 | 13 | 13 | 12 | 50 | 52 | 52 | CI: semi-finals UC: round of 16 | | Andrea Caracciolo | 9 |
| 2006–07 | Serie A | 5th | 38 | 16 | 10 | 12 | 55 | 46 | 58 | UC: group stage | | Eugenio Corini | 10 |
| 2007–08 | Serie A | 11th | 38 | 12 | 11 | 15 | 47 | 47 | 47 | CI: round of 16; UC: first round | | Amauri | 15 |
| 2008–09 | Serie A | 8th | 38 | 17 | 6 | 15 | 57 | 50 | 57 | CI: third round | | Edinson Cavani Fabrizio Miccoli | 14 |
| 2009–10 | Serie A | 5th | 38 | 18 | 11 | 9 | 59 | 47 | 65 | CI: fifth round | | Fabrizio Miccoli | 19 |
| 2010–11 | Serie A | 8th | 38 | 17 | 5 | 16 | 58 | 63 | 56 | CI: runners-up UC: first round | | Javier Pastore | 11 |
| 2011–12 | Serie A | 16th | 38 | 11 | 10 | 17 | 52 | 62 | 43 | CI: round of 16; UC: 3rd preliminary round | | Fabrizio Miccoli | 14 |
| 2012–13 | Serie A | 18th | 38 | 6 | 14 | 18 | 34 | 54 | 32 | CI: fourth round | | Josip Iličić | 11 |
| 2013–14 | Serie B | 1st | 42 | 25 | 11 | 6 | 62 | 28 | 86 | CI: third round | | Abel Hernández | 14 |
| 2014–15 | Serie A | 11th | 38 | 12 | 13 | 13 | 53 | 55 | 49 | CI: third round | | Paulo Dybala | 13 |
| 2015–16 | Serie A | 16th | 38 | 10 | 9 | 19 | 38 | 56 | 39 | CI: fourth round | | Alberto Gilardino | 11 |
| 2016–17 | Serie A | 19th | 38 | 6 | 8 | 24 | 33 | 77 | 26 | CI: fourth round | | Ilija Nestorovski | 11 |
| 2017–18 | Serie B | 4th | 42 | 18 | 17 | 7 | 59 | 39 | 71 | CI: third round | | Ilija Nestorovski | 13 |
| 2018–19 | Serie B | 11th | 36 | 16 | 15 | 5 | 57 | 38 | 43 | CI: third round | | Ilija Nestorovski | 14 |
| 2019–20 | Serie D | 1st | 26 | 20 | 3 | 3 | 47 | 16 | 63 | CID: preliminary round | | Giovanni Ricciardo | 9 |
| 2020–21 | Serie C | 7th | 36 | 14 | 11 | 11 | 44 | 40 | 53 | | | Lorenzo Lucca | 13 |
| 2021–22 | Serie C | 3rd | 36 | 18 | 12 | 6 | 64 | 33 | 66 | CIC: round of 16 | | Matteo Brunori | 25 |
| 2022–23 | Serie B | 9th | 38 | 11 | 16 | 11 | 48 | 49 | 49 | CI: round of 64 | | Matteo Brunori | 17 |
| 2023–24 | Serie B | 6th | 38 | 15 | 11 | 12 | 62 | 53 | 56 | CI: round of 64 | | Matteo Brunori | 17 |
| 2024–25 | Serie B | 8th | 38 | 14 | 10 | 14 | 52 | 43 | 52 | CI: second round | | Matteo Brunori; Joel Pohjanpalo | 9 |
