= 2002–03 US Città di Palermo season =

Palermo
2002–03 season
- President: Maurizio Zamparini
- Manager: Ezio Glerean (Coppa Italia and matchday 3); Daniele Arrigoni (Matchdays 1–2 and 4–22); Nedo Sonetti (Matchdays 23–38)
- Stadium: La Favorita (Note: On 18 September 2002 the stadium was officially renamed as Stadio Comunale Renzo Barbera in honour of the chairman Renzo Barbera, who had died on 20 May 2002.)
- Serie B: 6th
- Coppa Italia: Group stage
- Top goalscorer: League: Filippo Maniero (13); All: Filippo Maniero (15)
- Highest home attendance: 31,572 (v Hellas Verona)
- Lowest home attendance: 8,595 (v Bari)
- Average home league attendance: 16,282
- Biggest win: 4–0 (v Taranto)
- Biggest defeat: 0–3 (v Lecce)

The 2002–03 season was U.S. Città di Palermo's second season in a row in Serie B. In addition to the domestic league, Palermo participated in this season's edition of the Coppa Italia.

== Players and statistics ==
As of 7 June 2003

No.	Pos	Nat	Player	Total		Serie B		Coppa Italia	
No.	Pos	Nat	Player	Apps	Goals	Apps	Goals	Apps	Goals
Goalkeepers
1	GK	(Italy) ITA	Vincenzo Sicignano	33	0	30	0	3	0
19	GK	(Italy) ITA	Nicola Santoni	9	0	9	0	0	0
21	GK	(Italy) ITA	Marco Viola	0	0	0	0	0	0
22	GK	(Italy) ITA	Francesco Tarantino	0	0	0	0	0	0
Defenders
2	DF	(Sierra Leone) SLE	Kewullay Conteh	17	1	17	1	0	0
3	DF	(Brazil) BRA	Fábio Bilica	15	0	12	0	3	0
3	DF	(Italy) ITA	Paolo Tricoli	0	0	0	0	0	0
6	DF	(Italy) ITA	Paolo Cotroneo	1	0	1	0	0	0
13	DF	(Italy) ITA	Pietro Accardi	29	0	28	0	1	0
25	DF	(Romania) ROU	Valentin Năstase	24	1	22	1	2	0
27	DF	(Italy) ITA	Matteo Pivotto	20	0	20	0	0	0
33	DF	(Italy) ITA	Francesco Modesto	13	0	12	0	1	0
36	DF	(Italy) ITA	Luca Ferri	17	0	14	0	3	0
37	DF	(Italy) ITA	Oscar Brevi	16	0	16	0	0	0
77	DF	(Italy) ITA	Alessandro Lucarelli	30	0	28	0	2	0
Midfielders
4	MF	(Italy) ITA	Stefano Morrone	38	5	35	5	3	0
7	MF	(Romania) ROU	Paul Codrea	12	2	12	2	0	0
8	MF	(Italy) ITA	Antonio Marasco	17	1	15	1	2	0
8	MF	(Italy) ITA	Salvatore Masiello	2	0	2	0	0	0
11	MF	(Italy) ITA	Daniele Di Donato	35	0	32	0	3	0
12	MF	(Italy) ITA	Roberto Palumbo	0	0	0	0	0	0
14	MF	(Cameroon) CMR	Frank Ongfiang	5	0	4	0	1	0
20	MF	(Italy) ITA	Franco Brienza	2	0	0	0	2	0
20	MF	(Italy) ITA	Lamberto Zauli	22	6	21	6	1	0
23	MF	(Sweden) SWE	Valentino Lai	1	0	1	0	0	0
24	MF	(Nigeria) NGA	John Olufemi	2	0	2	0	0	0
28	MF	(Italy) ITA	Massimo Mutarelli	30	0	28	0	2	0
30	MF	(Italy) ITA	Manolo Pestrin	4	0	4	0	0	0
31	MF	(Italy) ITA	Antonino Asta	25	4	24	3	1	1
81	MF	(Argentina) ARG	Mario Santana	33	1	33	1	0	0
Forwards
5	FW	(Argentina) ARG	Cristian La Grottería	23	2	21	2	2	0
7	FW	(Italy) ITA	Giuseppe Mascara	20	4	17	2	3	2
9	FW	(Italy) ITA	Filippo Maniero	34	15	31	13	3	2
10	FW	(Italy) ITA	Arturo Di Napoli	33	8	30	8	3	0
82	FW	(Italy) ITA	Davide Matteini	1	0	1	0	0	0

== Competitions ==
=== Overview ===
Competition	First match	Last match	Starting round	Final position	Record							
Competition	First match	Last match	Starting round	Final position	Pld	W	D	L	GF	GA	GD	Win %
Serie B	14 September 2002	7 June 2003	Matchday 3 (Note: The first two games were postponed due to a dispute between clubs and pay TVs.)	6th place	38	15	13	10	45	42	+3	39.47
Coppa Italia	18 August 2002	8 September 2002	Group stage	Group stage	3	1	1	1	5	2	+3	33.33
Total					41	16	14	11	50	44	+6	39.02

Source: Archivio storico - U.S. Città di Palermo

=== Serie B ===
==== League table ====
Pos	Team	Pld	W	D	L	GF	GA	GD	Pts	Promotion or relegation
4	Ancona (P)	38	16	13	9	53	40	+13	61	Promotion to Serie A
5	Triestina	38	16	10	12	54	46	+8	58	
6	Palermo	38	15	13	10	45	42	+3	58	
7	Ternana	38	14	13	11	45	37	+8	55	
8	Cagliari	38	14	12	12	47	46	+1	54	

Source: Almanacco Illustrato del Calcio - La Storia 1898-2004, Panini Edizioni, Modena, September 2005
Rules for classification: 1) points; 2) head-to-head points; 3) head-to-head goal difference; 4) head-to-head goals scored; 5) goal difference; 6) number of goals scored.
(P) Promoted

==== Matches ====
Day	Date	Opponents	Venue	Result	Scorers	Attendance
3	14 September 2002	Ancona	A	2–4	Maniero (2) 31' (pen.), 90+2' (pen.)	8,652
4	21 September 2002	Siena	H	1–0	Maniero 41' (pen.)	19,619
5	28 September 2002	Triestina	A	1–2	Marasco 53'	8,766
6	5 October 2002	Livorno	H	1–0	Maniero 56'	14,593
7	13 October 2002	Salernitana	A	1–3	Di Napoli 65'	9,253
8	19 October 2002	Vicenza	A	3–1	Zauli (2) 26', 57', Santana 69'	4,350
9	26 October 2002	Cagliari	H	1–1	Maniero 6'	25,443
10	2 November 2002	Bari	A	1–0	Maniero 7'	6,098
1	5 November 2002	Cosenza	A	2–1	Morrone 5', Maniero 79' (pen.)	3,565
11	10 November 2002	Venezia	H	0–2		21,399
12	18 November 2002	Catania	A	0–2		21,000
13	24 November 2002	Ternana	H	2–1	Mascara 36', Maniero 55' (pen.)	12,689
14	29 November 2002	Napoli	A	0–0		10,355
15	8 December 2002	Genoa	H	0–0		10,614
16	15 December 2002	Messina	A	1–2	Maniero 81'	9,124
17	22 December 2002	Ascoli	H	2–2	Mascara 18', Di Napoli 89'	10,953
2	6 January 2003	Sampdoria	H	0–0		23,435
18	12 January 2003	Hellas Verona	A	0–0		10,378
19	19 January 2003	Lecce	H	2–0	Di Napoli (2), 24', 90+4'	13,271
20	26 January 2003	Cosenza	H	1–0	Di Napoli 36' (pen.)	11,880
21	2 February 2003	Sampdoria	A	0–1		19,814
22	9 February 2003	Ancona	H	0–1		14,370
23	23 February 2003	Siena	A	1–2	Conteh 64'	6,025
24	2 March 2003	Triestina	H	1–0	Nastase 57'	11,257
25	9 March 2003	Livorno	A	2–2	La Grottería 34' (pen.), Morrone 36'	9,663
26	16 March 2003	Salernitana	H	1–1	Maniero 2' (pen.)	11,146
27	23 March 2003	Vicenza	H	1–0	Morrone 43'	10,946
28	30 March 2003	Cagliari	A	2–2	Morrone 15', Maniero 69'	8,000
29	4 April 2003	Bari	H	2–2	Codrea 85', Di Napoli 90'	8,595
30	12 April 2003	Venezia	A	2–0	Codrea 4' (pen.), La Grottería 78'	2,958
31	19 April 2003	Catania	H	3–3	Asta 33', Zauli 55', Maniero 61'	25,155
32	26 April 2003	Ternana	A	0–0		11,122
33	4 May 2003	Napoli	H	2–1	Maniero 1', Asta 17'	13,626
34	10 May 2003	Genoa	A	1–1	Asta 6'	18,142
35	17 May 2003	Messina	H	2–1	Di Napoli 15', Morrone 79'	18,791
36	24 May 2003	Ascoli	A	2–1	Zauli 16', Di Napoli 90'	6,704
37	31 May 2003	Verona	H	2–0	Zauli (2) 7', 31'	31,572
38	7 June 2003	Lecce	A	0–3		35,038

Win	Draw	Loss

- Source: Formazioni Palermo

=== Coppa Italia ===
==== Group 8 table ====
Pos	Team	Pld	W	D	L	GF	GA	GD	Pts
1	Reggina	3	2	1	0	4	0	+4	7
2	Palermo	3	1	1	1	5	2	+3	4
3	Taranto	3	1	0	2	1	7	−6	3
4	Messina	3	0	2	1	1	2	−1	2

==== Matches ====
Round	Date	Opponents	Venue	Result	Scorers
Group stage – Day 1	18 August 2002	Messina	A	1–1	Mascara 81'
Group stage – Day 2	25 August 2002	Taranto	H	4–0	Maniero (2) 27' (pen.), 54', Mascara 61', Asta 86'
Group stage – Day 3	8 September 2002	Reggina	H	0–1	

Win	Draw	Loss

- Source: La Coppa Italia
