= List of Palermo FC players =

The following notable footballers have played for Palermo Football Club. Generally, this means players that have played 100 or more league matches for the club. However, some players who have played fewer matches are also included; this includes players that have had considerable success at Italian top flight or European level with other clubs, club record holders, and players who have appeared at least once in the FIFA World Cup, or regulars who appeared with a national team during their stay with the club.

Players are listed according to the date of their first-team debut for the club. Appearances and goals are for first-team competitive domestic league matches only; wartime and playoff matches are excluded. Substitute appearances included. Statistics correct as of June 10, 2007.

Name	Nationality	Position	Palermo career	Appearances	Goals	Note
Carlo Radice	Italy	FW	1929–1933, 1934–1935	?	64	Most league goals
Archimede Valeriani	Italy	GK	1929–1934	152	0	
Américo Ruffino	Argentina	FW	1929–1934	135	32	
Ettore Banchero	Italy	FW	1931–1933	55	21	
Antonio Blasevich	Italy	MF	1931–1935	121	17	
Luigi Ziroli	Italy	MF	1931–1940	194	9	
Gennaro Santillo	Italy	DF	1932–1940	234	5	
Héctor Scarone	Uruguay	MF	1932–1934	56	4	1930 FIFA World Cup winner
Maximiliano Faotto	Uruguay	DF	1932–1942, 1945–1947	129	3	
Oliver Icardi	Uruguay	MF	1935–1937, 1939–1940	54	24	
Umberto Di Falco	Italy	FW	1936–1940	73	26	
Carmelo Di Bella	Italy	MF	1941–1949	111	12	
Čestmír Vycpálek	Czechoslovakia	MF	1947–1952	143	23	
Aurelio Pavesi De Marco	Italy	FW	1947–1950	59	35	
Dante Di Maso	Italy	MF	1947–1948, 1949–1955	164	42	
Pietro De Santis	Italy	FW	1948–1950	60	20	
Carlo Galli	Italy	FW	1949–1951	45	16	1954 FIFA World Cup participant
Aredio Gimona	Italy	MF	1949–1953	124	9	
Gino Giaroli	Italy	DF	1949–1954	151	7	
Helge Bronée	Denmark	MF	1950–1952	70	22	
Şükrü Gülesin	Turkey	FW	1950–1951, 1952–1953	50	20	
Bülent Eken	Turkey	DF	1951–1952	17	0	1954 FIFA World Cup participant
Benigno De Grandi	Italy	DF	1951–1954, 1955–1956	97	8	
Enrique Martegani	Argentina	FW	1952–1955	93	21	
Enzo Benedetti	Italy	DF	1955–1965	274	0	
Walter Gómez	Uruguay	FW	1956–1958	48	8	
Santiago Vernazza	Argentina	FW	1956–1960	115	51	
Antonio De Bellis	Italy	DF	1957–1961, 1965–1971	258	0	
Alberto Malavasi	Italy	MF	1957–1965	248	11	
Roberto Anzolin	Italy	GK	1959–1961	71	0	1966 FIFA World Cup participant
Dionisio Arce	Paraguay	FW	1959–1961	27	2	
Tarcisio Burgnich	Italy	DF	1961–1962	31	1	1966, 1970, 1974 FIFA World Cup participant
Rune Börjesson	Sweden	MF	1961–1962	38	10	
Carlo Mattrel	Italy	GK	1961–1962	34	0	1962 FIFA World Cup participant
Metin Oktay	Turkey	FW	1961–1962	12	3	
José Ferdinando Puglia	Brazil	MF	1961–1963	62	13	
Lennart Skoglund	Sweden	MF	1962–1963	6	0	1950, 1958 FIFA World Cup participant
Mario Giubertoni	Italy	DF	1964–1970	199	2	
Giovanni Ferretti	Italy	GK	1964–1974	166	0	
Gaetano Troja	Italy	FW	1964–1966, 1968–1973	172	43	
Ignazio Arcoleo	Italy	MF	1966–1967, 1970–1974, 1978–1980	192	6	
Silvino Bercellino	Italy	FW	1966–1972	134	39	
Franco Landri	Italy	DF	1966–1973	213	2	
Romeo Benetti	Italy	MF	1967–1968	35	2	1974, 1978 FIFA World Cup participant
Giuseppe Furino	Italy	DF	1968–1969	27	1	1970 FIFA World Cup participant
Sergio Pellizzaro	Italy	FW	1968–1971	85	23	
Enzo Ferrari	Italy	FW	1968–1972	126	22	
Edoardo Reja	Italy	MF	1968–1973	124	1	
Franco Causio	Italy	MF	1969–1970	22	3	1982 FIFA World Cup winner
Spartaco Landini	Italy	DF	1970–1973	97	0	1966 FIFA World Cup participant
Sergio Girardi	Italy	GK	1970–1974	119	0	
Sandro Vanello	Italy	MF	1970–1975	153	12	
Erminio Favalli	Italy	DF	1971–1978	203	6	
Sergio Magistrelli	Italy	FW	1973–1974, 1976–1978	87	23	
Antonino Trapani	Italy	GK	1974–1979	119	0	
Valerio Majo	Italy	MF	1974–1978, 1983–1986	212	12	
Filippo Citterio	Italy	DF	1975–1979	129	2	
Lorenzo Frison	Italy	GK	1975–1981	103	0	
Mauro Di Cicco	Italy	DF	1976–1984	237	0	
Vito Chimenti	Italy	FW	1977–1979	74	29	
Gian Piero Gasperini	Italy	MF	1978–1983	128	11	
Massimo De Stefanis	Italy	MF	1979–1984	169	30	
Giampaolo Montesano	Italy	MF	1979–1984	170	21	
Giuseppe Volpecina	Italy	DF	1980–1984	133	6	
Gianni De Rosa	Italy	FW	1981–1983	61	29	Serie B topscorer title as a Palermo player
Tebaldo Bigliardi	Italy	DF	1981–1986, 1993–1994	144	1	
Gianni De Biasi	Italy	MF	1983–1986	105	7	
Pietro De Sensi	Italy	DF	1987–1994	201	17	
Domenico Di Carlo	Italy	MF	1987–1990	97	6	
Roberto Biffi	Italy	DF	1988–1999	319	15	Most league appearances
Vincenzo Sicignano	Italy	GK	1994–2003	182	0	
Gianluca Berti	Italy	GK	1995–1996, 2003–2004	78	0	
Gaetano Vasari	Italy	MF	1995–1997, 2003–2004	95	18	
Davide Bombardini	Italy	MF	1999–2002	94	15	
Massimiliano Cappioli	Italy	MF	2000–2002	57	16	
Christian La Grotteria	Argentina	FW	2000–2003	80	17	
Daniele Di Donato	Italy	MF	2000–2004	133	4	
Franco Brienza	Italy	FW	2000–2002, 2003–2008	168	17	
Mario Santana	Argentina	MF	2002–2003, 2004–2006	91	4	
Lamberto Zauli	Italy	FW	2002–2005	69	14	Serie B promotion captain
Simone Pepe	Italy	MF	2003–2004, 2005–2006	22	1	2010 FIFA World Cup participant
Eugenio Corini	Italy	MF	2003–2007	129	25	
Luca Toni	Italy	FW	2003–2005	80	51	2006 FIFA World Cup winner; most goals in a season
Simone Barone	Italy	MF	2004–2006	71	5	2006 FIFA World Cup winner
Andrea Barzagli	Italy	DF	2004–2008	142	4	2006 FIFA World Cup winner
Giuseppe Biava	Italy	DF	2004–2008	112	5	
Fabio Grosso	Italy	DF	2004–2006	90	2	2006 FIFA World Cup winner
Cristian Zaccardo	Italy	DF	2004–2008	142	8	2006 FIFA World Cup winner
Mariano Andújar	Argentina	GK	2005–2006	11	0	2010 and 2014 FIFA World Cup participant
Giovanni Tedesco	Italy	MF	2005–2010	78	9	
Amauri	Italy	FW	2006–2008	52	23	
Alberto Fontana	Italy	GK	2006–2009	66	0	
Fábio Simplício	Brazil	MF	2006–2010	129	21	Capped as Palermo player
Mark Bresciano	Australia	MF	2006–2010	107	12	2006, 2010 and 2014 FIFA World Cup participant
Mattia Cassani	Italy	DF	2006–2011	161	2	Most European appearances
Salvatore Sirigu	Italy	GK	2006–2011	69	0	2014 FIFA World Cup participant
Cesare Bovo	Italy	DF	2006–2007, 2008–2011	89	7	
Fabrizio Miccoli	Italy	FW	2007–2013	165	74	Most Serie A league goals
Edinson Cavani	Uruguay	FW	2007–2010	109	34	2010 and 2014 FIFA World Cup participant
Marco Amelia	Italy	GK	2008–2009	34	0	2006 FIFA World Cup winner
Simon Kjær	Denmark	DF	2008–2010	62	5	2010 FIFA World Cup participant
Antonio Nocerino	Italy	MF	2008–2011	106	6	
Fabio Liverani	Italy	MF	2008–2011	66	0	
Federico Balzaretti	Italy	DF	2008–2012	143	3	
Dorin Goian	Romania	DF	2009–2011	30	1	
Javier Pastore	Argentina	MF	2009–2011	69	14	2010 FIFA World Cup participant
Abel Hernández	Uruguay	FW	2009–2014	111	31	2014 FIFA World Cup participant
Matteo Darmian	Italy	DF	2010–2011	11	0	2014 FIFA World Cup participant
Mauricio Pinilla	Chile	FW	2010–2012	35	10	2014 FIFA World Cup participant
Josip Iličić	Slovenia	MF	2010–2013	98	20	
Ezequiel Muñoz	Argentina	DF	2010–2015	131	5	
Afriyie Acquah	Ghana	MF	2011–2013	31	0	2014 FIFA World Cup participant
Alexandros Tzorvas	Greece	GK	2011–2012	11	0	2010 FIFA World Cup participant
Eran Zahavi	Israel	MF	2011–2012	23	2	
Édgar Barreto	Paraguay	MF	2011–2015	122	7	2006 and 2010 FIFA World Cup participant
Steve von Bergen	Switzerland	DF	2012–2013	34	1	2010 and 2014 FIFA World Cup participant
Egidio Arévalo Ríos	Uruguay	MF	2012–2013	27	2	2010 and 2014 FIFA World Cup participant
Emiliano Viviano	Italy	GK	2012–2014	20	0	
Paulo Dybala	Argentina	FW	2012–2015	90	21	2022 FIFA World Cup winner; 2022 Finalissima winner; 2021 Copa América winner
Franco Vázquez	Italy	MF	2012–2016	105	22	
Kyle Lafferty	Northern Ireland	FW	2013–2014	34	11	
Andrea Belotti	Italy	FW	2013–2015	62	16	
Stefano Sorrentino	Italy	GK	2013–2016	117	0	
Enzo Maresca	Italy	MF	2014–2016	47	1	
Achraf Lazaar	Morocco	DF	2014–2016	73	3	
Giancarlo González	Costa Rica	DF	2014–2017	82	4	2014 FIFA World Cup participant
Robin Quaison	Sweden	MF	2014–2017	66	7	2015 UEFA European Under-21 Championship winner
Ivaylo Chochev	Bulgaria	DF	2014–2019	116	12	
Oscar Hiljemark	Sweden	MF	2015–2017	53	4	2015 UEFA European Under-21 Championship winner
Alberto Gilardino	Italy	FW	2015–2016	33	10	2006 FIFA World Cup winner
Alessandro Diamanti	Italy	MF	2016–2017	31	1	
Aleksandar Trajkovski	North Macedonia	FW	2015–2019	104	16	
Ilija Nestorovski	North Macedonia	FW	2016–2019	94	38	
Toni Šunjić	Bosnia and Herzegovina	DF	2017	7	0	2014 FIFA World Cup participant
Matteo Brunori	Italy	FW	2021–	66	40	

== Key ==
- GK — Goalkeeper
- DF — Defender
- MF — Midfielder
- FW — Forward

Nationalities are indicated by the corresponding FIFA country code.

== Sources ==
- Channel 4: Palermo All-Time XI
- (in Italian) Cuore Rosanero
- (in Italian) Repubblica.it - Palermo edition article
- (in Italian) RSSSF: Sicilian teams in Serie A
- (in Italian) RSSSF: Sicilian teams in Serie B
