= 2007–08 Parma FC season =

Parma
2007–08 season
- Chairman: Guido Angiolini
- Manager: Domenico Di Carlo
- Serie A: 19th (relegated)
- Coppa Italia: Third Elimination Round
- Top goalscorer: League: Igor Budan (7); All: Igor Budan (7)
Home colours	Away colours	Third colours

== Squad ==
Note: Flags indicate national team as defined under FIFA eligibility rules; some limited exceptions apply. Players may hold more than one non-FIFA nationality.

No.	Pos.	Nation	Player
1	GK	CZE	Radek Petr
2	DF	ITA	Damiano Zenoni
4	MF	ITA	Stefano Morrone
5	GK	ITA	Luca Bucci
6	DF	ITA	Luca Antonelli
7	DF	ITA	Paolo Castellini
9	FW	ITA	Cristiano Lucarelli
10	FW	ITA	Domenico Morfeo
11	MF	ITA	Andrea Pisanu
13	DF	ITA	Marco Rossi
15	FW	ARG	Leandro Martínez
17	MF	KEN	McDonald Mariga
18	MF	ITA	Andrea Gasbarroni
19	DF	ITA	Giulio Falcone
21	MF	ITA	Luca Cigarini
22	MF	ITA	Federico Moretti

No.	Pos.	Nation	Player
23	MF	ITA	Daniele Dessena
24	DF	POR	Fernando Couto
28	DF	ITA	Massimo Paci
29	DF	ITA	Cristian Anelli
20	FW	CRO	Igor Budan
32	FW	ITA	Bernardo Corradi
33	DF	SEN	Ferdinand Coly
34	FW	SUI	Aleksandar Prijovic
55	MF	ITA	Francesco Parravicini
83	FW	BRA	Reginaldo
89	GK	ITA	Eros Corradini
99	GK	ITA	Nicola Pavarini
—	DF	ITA	Alessio Tombesi
—	MF	ITA	Davide Matteini
—	FW	ITA	Pietro Lorenzini
—	FW	ITA	Daniele Paponi

== Competitions ==
=== Serie A ===
==== Results ====
26 August 2007 1	Parma	2–2	Catania	Stadio Ennio Tardini, Parma
	Pisanu 28'; Rossi 43'	Summary	Morimoto 12'; Baiocco 44'

2 September 2007 2	Atalanta	2–0	Parma	Stadio Atleti Azzurri d'Italia, Bergamo
	Zampagna 21' (pen.); Carrozzieri 65'	Summary

16 September 2007 3	Parma	1–1	Cagliari	Stadio Ennio Tardini, Parma
	Corradi 72'	Summary	Matri 41'

22 September 2007 4	Milan	1–1	Parma	San Siro, Milan
	Seedorf 44'	Summary	Pisanu 73'

26 September 2007 5	Parma	2–0	Torino	Stadio Ennio Tardini, Parma
	Reginaldo 62'; Corradi 64'	Summary

30 September 2007 6	Udinese	2–1	Parma	Stadio Friuli, Udine
	Quagliarella 78'; Zapata 90+2'	Summary	Corradi 27'

7 October 2007 7	Parma	0–3	Roma	Stadio Ennio Tardini, Parma
	Corradi (yellow card) 17' (yellow-red card) 26'	Summary	Totti 2', 82'; Mancini 21'

21 October 2007 8	Sampdoria	3–0	Parma	Stadio Luigi Ferraris, Genoa
	Montella 25'; Bellucci 47', 58'	Summary

28 October 2007 9	Parma	3–2	Livorno	Stadio Ennio Tardini, Parma
	Morrone 9'; Paci 54'; Morfeo 74'	Summary	Tavano 23', 49' (pen.); De Vezze (red card) 90'^{1}

31 October 2007 10	Palermo	1–1	Parma	Stadio Renzo Barbera, Palermo
	Amauri 86'	Summary	Morrone 3'

4 November 2007 11	Parma	2–2	Siena	Stadio Ennio Tardini, Parma
	Corradi 24'; Matteini 80'	Summary	De Ceglie 33'; Galloppa 90'

11 November 2007 12	Parma	2–2	Juventus	Stadio Ennio Tardini, Parma
	Gasbarroni 43' (pen.); Pisanu 57'; Morfeo (red card) 78'^{2} Coly (red card) 90+2'	Summary	Legrottaglie 75'; Iaquinta 82'; Chiellini (red card) 78'

25 November 2007 13	Lazio	1–0	Parma	Stadio Olimpico, Rome
	Firmani 90'	Summary

2 December 2007 14	Parma	1–0	Empoli	Stadio Ennio Tardini, Parma
	Paci 21'	Summary

9 December 2007 15	Napoli	1–0	Parma	Stadio San Paolo, Naples
	Zalayeta 18'	Summary

16 December 2007 16	Parma	3–0	Reggina	Stadio Ennio Tardini, Parma
	Corradi 26'; Pisanu 49'; Paci 66'	Summary

22 December 2007 17	Genoa	1–0	Parma	Stadio Luigi Ferraris, Genoa
	Borriello 43' (pen.)	Summary

13 January 2008 18	Parma	1–2	Fiorentina	Stadio Ennio Tardini, Parma
	Coly 69'	Summary	Mutu 44', 85' (pen.)

20 January 2008 19	Inter	3–2	Parma	San Siro, Milan
	Cambiasso 30'; Ibrahimović 88' (pen.), 90+3'	Summary	Cigarini 40'; Gasbarroni 69'; Couto (red card) 87'

27 January 2008 20	Catania	0–0	Parma	Stadio Angelo Massimino, Catania
		Summary

3 February 2008 21	Parma	2–3	Atalanta	Stadio Ennio Tardini, Parma
	Lucarelli 39'; Gasbarroni 90+1' (pen.)	Summary	Pellegrino 18'; Bellini 54'; Floccari 69'

10 February 2008 22	Cagliari	1–1	Parma	Stadio Sant'Elia, Cagliari
	Jeda 34'	Summary	Reginaldo 36'

16 February 2008 23	Parma	0–0	Milan	Stadio Ennio Tardini, Parma
		Summary

23 February 2008 24	Torino	4–4	Parma	Stadio Olimpico di Torino, Turin
	Stellone 11', 69'; Natali 45'; Di Michele 82'	Summary	Gasbarroni 29', 32'; Morrone 42'; Budan 43'

27 February 2008 25	Parma	2–0	Udinese	Stadio Ennio Tardini, Parma
	Lucarelli 78'; Cigarini 87' (pen.)	Summary

1 March 2008 26	Roma	4–0	Parma	Stadio Olimpico, Rome
	Aquilani 27'; Falcone 51' (o.g.); Totti 80'; Vučinić 90+4'	Summary

9 March 2008 27	Parma	1–2	Sampdoria	Stadio Ennio Tardini, Parma
	Budan 67'	Summary	Maggio 12'; Bonazzoli 57'

16 March 2008 28	Livorno	1–1	Parma	Stadio Armando Picchi, Livorno
	Vidigal 41'	Summary	Reginaldo 61'

19 March 2008 29	Parma	2–1	Palermo	Stadio Ennio Tardini, Parma
	Mariga (yellow card) 13' (yellow-red card) 27'; Budan 53', 90' (pen.)	Summary	Cavani 68'; Barzagli (yellow card) 51' (yellow-red card) 70'

22 March 2008 30	Siena	2–0	Parma	Stadio Artemio Franchi, Siena
	Maccarone 87' (pen.), 90+1'	Summary

6 April 2008 32	Parma	2–2	Lazio	Stadio Ennio Tardini, Parma
	Budan 17'; Paci 43'	Summary	Pandev 35'; Bianchi 38'

13 April 2008 33	Empoli	1–1	Parma	Stadio Carlo Castellani, Empoli
	Giovinco 30'	Summary	Lucarelli 7'

16 April 2008 31	Parma	3–0	Juventus	Stadio delle Alpi, Turin
	Trezeguet 17'; Palladino 30'; Morrone 76' (o.g.)	Summary	Couto (red card) 78'
Note: The match was rescheduled from March 30 due to the death of a Parma fan in a road accident.

20 April 2008 34	Parma	1–2	Napoli	Stadio Ennio Tardini, Parma
	Budan 23' (pen.); Mariga (yellow card) 28' (red card) 45'; Falcone (red card) 77'; Gasbarroni (red card) 80'	Summary	Domizzi 45+3'; Bogliacino 72'; Gargano (red card) 77'

27 April 2008 35	Reggina	2–1	Parma	Stadio Oreste Granillo, Reggio Calabria
	Cozza 55', 64'	Summary	Cigarini 25' (pen.); Paci (yellow card) 38' (yellow-red card) 54'

4 May 2008 36	Parma	1–0	Genoa	Stadio Ennio Tardini, Parma
	Lucarelli 58'	Summary

11 May 2008 37	Fiorentina	3–1	Parma	Stadio Artemio Franchi, Florence
	Santana 39'; Semioli 77'; Osvaldo 86'	Summary	Budan 11'; Rossi (yellow card) 80' (yellow-red card) 80'

18 May 2008 38	Parma	0–2	Inter	Stadio Ennio Tardini, Parma
		Summary	Ibrahimović 62', 79'

Notes

- De Vezze was an unused sub.
- Domenico Morfeo was an unused sub.

==== League table ====
Pos	Team	Pld	W	D	L	GF	GA	GD	Pts	Qualification or relegation
16	Reggina	38	9	13	16	37	56	−19	40 (Note: Torino finished ahead of Reggina on head-to-head points: Torino 2-2 Reggina, Reggina 1–3 Torino.)	
17	Catania	38	8	13	17	33	45	−12	37	
18	Empoli (R)	38	9	9	20	29	52	−23	36	Relegation to Serie B
19	Parma (R)	38	7	13	18	42	62	−20	34	Relegation to Serie B
20	Livorno (R)	38	6	12	20	35	60	−25	30	Relegation to Serie B

Source: Serie A
Rules for classification: 1) points; 2) head-to-head points; 3) head-to-head goal difference; 4) head-to-head goals scored; 5) goal difference; 6) number of goals scored.
(R) Relegated

=== Coppa Italia ===
29 August 2007 Third Elimination Round	Parma	1–3	Juventus	Stadio Ennio Tardini, Parma
21:00 CEST	Castellini 75' (pen.)	[Report]	Molinaro 62'; Almirón 73'; Salihamidžić 82'	Referee: Mauro Bergonzi

== Squad statistics ==
=== Appearances and goals ===
No.	Pos	Nat	Player	Total		Serie A		Coppa Italia	
No.	Pos	Nat	Player	Apps	Goals	Apps	Goals	Apps	Goals
2	DF	(Italy) ITA	Damiano Zenoni	31	0	26+5	0	0+0	0
4	MF	(Italy) ITA	Stefano Morrone	36	3	36+0	3	0+0	0
5	GK	(Italy) ITA	Luca Bucci	31	0	30+1	0	0+0	0
6	DF	(Italy) ITA	Luca Antonelli	8	0	2+6	0	0+0	0
7	DF	(Italy) ITA	Paolo Castellini	34	1	34+0	0	0+0	1
9	FW	(Italy) ITA	Cristiano Lucarelli	16	4	12+4	4	0+0	0
10	FW	(Italy) ITA	Domenico Morfeo	10	1	0+10	1	0+0	0
11	MF	(Italy) ITA	Andrea Pisanu	26	4	25+1	4	0+0	0
13	DF	(Italy) ITA	Marco Rossi	15	1	13+2	1	0+0	0
15	FW	(Argentina) ARG	Leandro Martínez	1	0	0+1	0	0+0	0
17	MF	(Kenya) KEN	McDonald Mariga	18	0	11+7	0	0+0	0
18	MF	(Italy) ITA	Andrea Gasbarroni	26	5	19+7	5	0+0	0
19	DF	(Italy) ITA	Giulio Falcone	28	0	28+0	0	0+0	0
20	FW	(Croatia) CRO	Igor Budan	15	7	10+5	7	0+0	0
21	MF	(Italy) ITA	Luca Cigarini	32	3	27+5	3	0+0	0
22	MF	(Italy) ITA	Federico Moretti	1	0	0+1	0	0+0	0
23	MF	(Italy) ITA	Daniele Dessena	28	0	17+11	0	0+0	0
24	DF	(Portugal) POR	Fernando Couto	17	0	16+1	0	0+0	0
28	DF	(Italy) ITA	Massimo Paci	22	4	20+2	4	0+0	0
29	DF	(Italy) ITA	Cristian Anelli	1	0	0+1	0	0+0	0
32	FW	(Italy) ITA	Bernardo Corradi	27	5	21+6	5	0+0	0
33	DF	(Senegal) SEN	Ferdinand Coly	21	1	20+1	1	0+0	0
34	FW	(Switzerland) SUI	Aleksandar Prijović	1	0	0+1	0	0+0	0
55	MF	(Italy) ITA	Francesco Parravicini	16	0	10+6	0	0+0	0
83	FW	(Brazil) BRA	Reginaldo	35	3	31+4	3	0+0	0
99	GK	(Italy) ITA	Nicola Pavarini	9	0	8+1	0	0+0	0
	DF	(Italy) ITA	Alessio Tombesi	2	0	0+2	0	0+0	0
	MF	(Italy) ITA	Davide Matteini	12	1	1+11	1	0+0	0
	FW	(Italy) ITA	Pietro Lorenzini	1	0	0+1	0	0+0	0
	FW	(Italy) ITA	Daniele Paponi	7	0	1+6	0	0+0	0
Players who appeared for Parma that left during the season:

=== Top scorers ===
Place	Position	Nation	Number	Name	Serie A	Coppa Italia	Total
1	FW	(Croatia)	20	Igor Budan	7	0	7
2	FW	(Italy)	32	Bernardo Corradi	5	0	5
2	MF	(Italy)	18	Andrea Gasbarroni	5	0	5
4	FW	(Italy)	11	Andrea Pisanu	4	0	4
4	FW	(Italy)	9	Cristiano Lucarelli	4	0	4
4	DF	(Italy)	28	Massimo Paci	3	0	3
7	FW	(Brazil)	83	Reginaldo	3	0	3
7	MF	(Italy)	4	Stefano Morrone	3	0	3
7	MF	(Italy)	21	Luca Cigarini	3	0	3
10	DF	(Italy)	13	Marco Rossi	1	0	1
10	FW	(Italy)	10	Domenico Morfeo	1	0	1
10	FW	(Italy)		Davide Matteini	1	0	1
10	DF	(Senegal)	33	Ferdinand Coly	1	0	1
10	DF	(Italy)	7	Paolo Castellini	0	1	1
				TOTALS	42	1	43

=== Disciplinary record ===
Number	Nation	Position	Name	Serie A		Coppa Italia		Total	
Number	Nation	Position	Name	Yellow card	Red card	Yellow card	Red card	Yellow card	Red card
2	(Italy)	DF	Damiano Zenoni	4	0	0	0	4	0
4	(Italy)	MF	Stefano Morrone	7	0	0	0	7	0
7	(Italy)	DF	Paolo Castellini	5	0	0	0	5	0
9	(Italy)	FW	Cristiano Lucarelli	5	0	0	0	5	0
10	(Italy)	FW	Domenico Morfeo	3	0	0	0	3	0
11	(Italy)	MF	Andrea Pisanu	6	0	0	0	6	0
13	(Italy)	DF	Marco Rossi	4	1	0	0	4	1
17	(Kenya)	MF	McDonald Mariga	6	2	0	0	6	2
18	(Italy)	MF	Andrea Gasbarroni	6	1	0	0	6	1
19	(Italy)	DF	Giulio Falcone	5	1	0	0	5	1
20	(Croatia)	FW	Igor Budan	1	0	0	0	1	0
21	(Italy)	MF	Luca Cigarini	8	0	0	0	8	0
23	(Italy)	MF	Daniele Dessena	5	0	0	0	5	0
24	(Portugal)	DF	Fernando Couto	3	2	0	0	3	2
28	(Italy)	DF	Massimo Paci	7	1	0	0	7	1
32	(Italy)	FW	Bernardo Corradi	5	1	0	0	5	1
33	(Senegal)	DF	Ferdinand Coly	2	1	0	0	2	1
55	(Italy)	MF	Francesco Parravicini	5	0	0	0	5	0
83	(Brazil)	FW	Reginaldo	8	0	0	0	8	0
99	(Italy)	GK	Nicola Pavarini	2	0	0	0	2	0
			TOTALS	97	10	0	0	97	10

== Sources ==
- RSSSF – Italy 2007/08
