= Evans Soligo =

Italian footballer (born 1979)

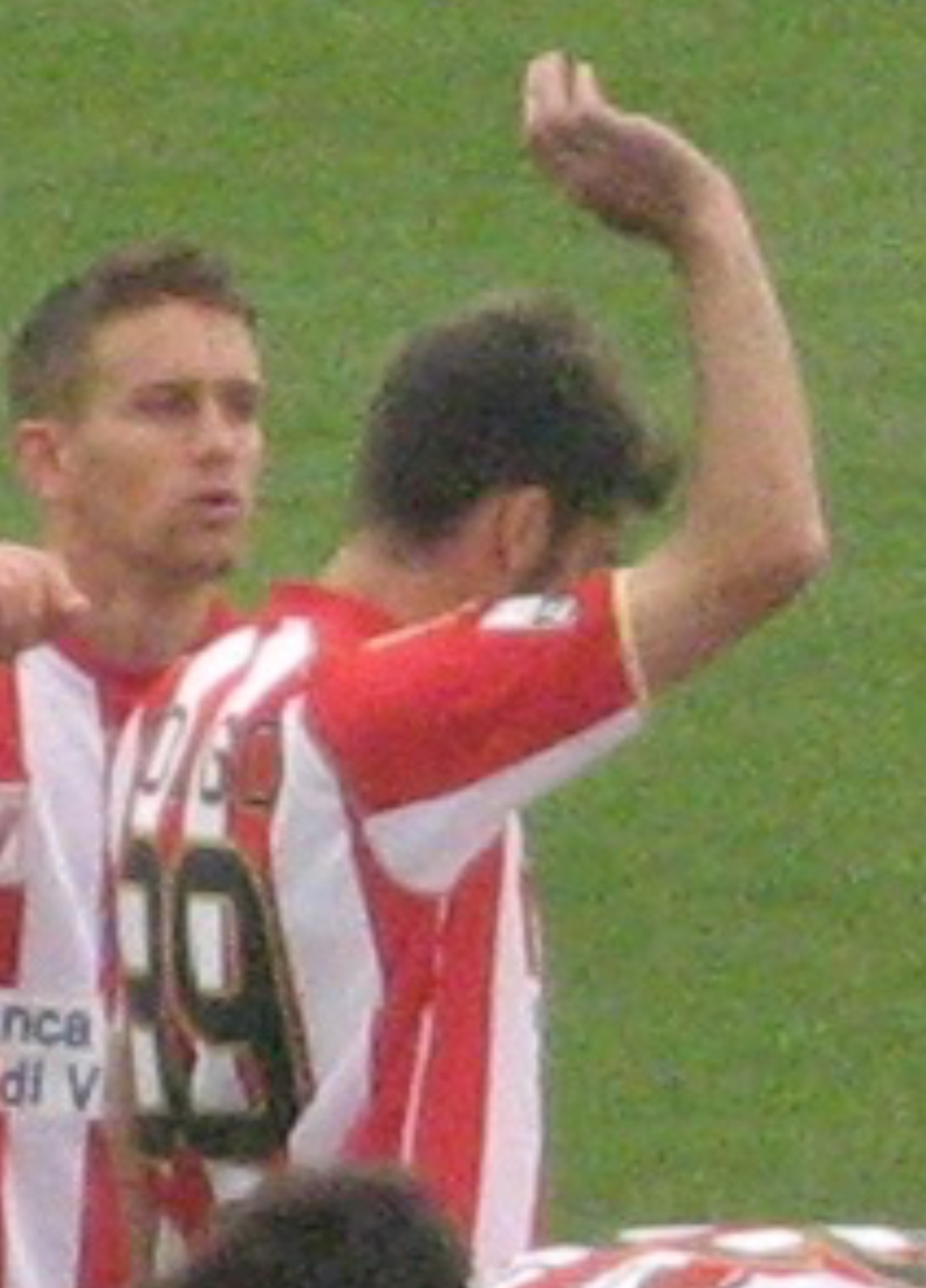

Personal information
- Date of birth: 14 January 1979 (age 47)
- Place of birth: Marghera, Italy
- Height: 1.80 m (5 ft 11 in)
- Position: Midfielder

Youth career
- –1998: Venezia

Senior career*
Years	Team	Apps	(Gls)
1998–2002	Venezia	0	(0)
1998–1999	→ Sandonà (loan)	33	(2)
1999–2000	→ SPAL (loan)	28	(3)
2000–2002	→ Lumezzane (loan)	61	(3)
2002–2005	Palermo	9	(0)
2002–2003	→ Venezia (loan)	18	(1)
2004	→ Triestina (loan)	17	(1)
2005	→ Hellas Verona (loan)	11	(0)
2005–2010	Salernitana	166	(10)
2010–2012	Vicenza	69	(2)
2012–2013	Paganese	27	(0)
2013–2014	Delta Porto Tolle	22	(1)
2014–2015	San Marino Calcio	31	(1)
2015–2018	Venezia	57	(4)
Total		549	(29)

Managerial career
- 2019–2025: Venezia Primavera (assistant coach)
- 2025–: Palermo (technical collaborator)
- * Club domestic league appearances and goals

Evans Soligo (born 14 January 1979) is an Italian former footballer who played as a midfielder. He is currently working as Filippo Inzaghi's technical collaborator at Serie B club Palermo. Soligo spent his entire career playing for clubs in Serie B and Serie C.

== Playing career ==
Born in Marghera, the inland part of Venice, Soligo began his career with hometown club A.C. Venezia. In the 1998–99 season, he was loaned to Serie C1 and Serie C2 clubs Sandonà, SPAL and Lumezzane, respectively. In July 2002, following Venezia owner Maurizio Zamparini's takeover of Palermo from then–AS Roma president Franco Sensi, Zamparini brought most of Venezia's players to Palermo in August and planned to sell Venezia to an uncredited person (AC Venezia then folded in 2005). Among those signed were players such as Stefano Morrone, Daniel Andersson, Fábio Bilica, Igor Budan, Francesco Ciullo, Kewullay Conteh, Arturo Di Napoli, Valentino Lai, Filippo Maniero, Antonio Marasco, Francesco Modesto, Franck Ongfiang, Generoso Rossi, Mario Santana, Ighli Vannucchi and William Viali, all of whom left for the Sicilian side.

But at the start of the season, he was loaned back to Venezia from Palermo along with Budan and Andrea Guerra. Soligo made his Serie B debut with Venezia on 19 October 2002 (round 8, but the 6th match as the first two were postponed). He was in the starting XI and was replaced by Anderson Luiz in the 77th minute, 1 minute after Daniele Amerini scored the equalizing goal. The match eventually ended 1–1 with Ternana. Soligo then remained in the starting XI until round 21 (31 January), when he appeared as a substitute. He played his next match in round 35 and featured in all four of the last matches as a member of the starting XI (rounds 35 to 38).

In the 2003–04 season, Soligo returned to Palermo but made just nine league appearances for the Serie B champions.

Soligo was not a part of the club's Serie A plans, and so on 21 July 2004, he was loaned to Serie B side Triestina, three days before the Rosanero's pre-season training camp. On 31 January 2005, he was loaned to fellow Serie B promotion hopefuls Verona. But he made just 11 league appearances, and the team missed the chance to enter the promotion play-offs when they finished 1 point behind Ascoli, who were eventually promoted to Serie A due to the Caso Genoa scandal and the bankruptcy of Torino Calcio (leading to Torino F.C.'s formation and subsequent reinstatement to Serie B). The 2005–06 season also saw the bankruptcy of Salernitana Sport (leading to Salernitana Calcio 1919's formation and subsequent reinstatement to Serie C1).

Soligo remained with the southern Italian side for five seasons; he won the Serie C1 Group B championship with the team in 2008 and spent the last two seasons in Serie B. The team avoided the drop in 2009 by finishing 1 point ahead of relegated Cittadella and Rimini. But following the Salerno club's relegation to Lega Pro Prima Divisione (ex–Serie C1) and subsequent expulsion from the league, he joined Serie B side Vicenza on a free transfer, returning to the Veneto region after five years in Campania.

In summer 2012, he moved to Paganese; in November 2013, he joined Delta Rovigo. Soligo spent the 2014–15 season with San Marino Calcio; in summer 2015, however, he returned to his boyhood club, Venezia, after twelve years away. With the Arancio-nero-verde (Orange-black-and-green) side, he achieved back-to-back promotions: from Serie D to Serie C, and subsequently from Serie C to Serie B during the 2016–2017 season. Following the 2017–2018 season, he decided to retire from professional football.

== Coaching career ==
Following retirement, Soligo remained at Venezia, serving as assistant coach of the Primavera (under-19 side) during the 2019–2020 season.

In June 2025, Soligo joined Filippo Inzaghi's coaching staff at Palermo as a technical collaborator.

In June 2025, Soligo joined Filippo Inzaghi's coaching staff at Palermo as a technical collaborator.

== Honours ==
Palermo

- Serie B: 2003–04

Salernitana

- Serie C1: 2007–08

Venezia

- Serie D: 2015–16
- Lega Pro: 2016–17
- Coppa Italia Lega Pro: 2016–17
