= Stefano Morrone =

Italian footballer (born 1978)

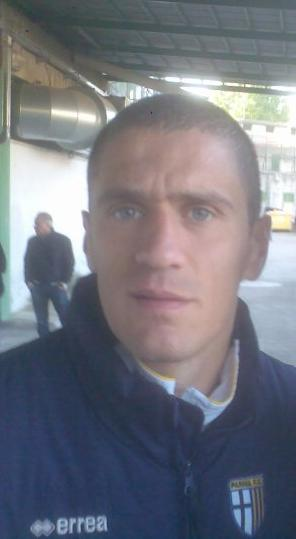

Personal information
- Date of birth: 26 October 1978 (age 48)
- Place of birth: Cosenza, Italy
- Height: 1.78 m (5 ft 10 in)
- Position: Central midfielder

Youth career
- Cosenza

Senior career*
Years	Team	Apps	(Gls)
1997–1998	Cosenza	27	(2)
1998–1999	Empoli	24	(0)
1999–2001	Piacenza	32	(0)
2001–2002	Venezia	18	(1)
2002	→ Cosenza (loan)	14	(0)
2002–2005	Palermo	58	(5)
2003–2004	→ Chievo (loan)	20	(0)
2005–2007	Livorno	72	(7)
2007–2015	Parma	169	(9)
2013–2014	→ Latina (loan)	33	(3)
2014–2015	→ Pisa (loan)	25	(4)

International career
1999–2000	Italy U21	9	(0)

Managerial career
- 2015–2016: Parma (Allievi)
- 2016–2017: Parma (Berretti)
- 2016: Parma (caretaker)
- 2017–2018: Sassuolo (Berretti)
- 2018–2019: Sassuolo (Primavera)
- 2019: Brescia (assistant)
- 2020–2021: Sion (assistant)
- 2021–2023: Frosinone (assistant)
- 2023: Ternana (assistant)
- * Club domestic league appearances and goals

Stefano Morrone (born 26 October 1978) is an Italian football coach and a former player who played as a midfielder.

== Club career ==
In 1998, he was co-signed by Lazio and Empoli. In 1999, he joined Piacenza along with Flavio Roma and Stefano Di Fiordo to Piacenza as part of Simone Inzaghi's deal. That month Piacenza also signed Empoli team-mate Arturo Di Napoli.

In January 2001, he joined Venezia, re-joined Di Napoli. He was loaned back to Cosenza in January 2002.

=== Palermo ===
After Venezia's owner Maurizio Zamparini purchased Palermo, he joined the Sicily side along with team-mate: Daniel Andersson, Bilica, Igor Budan, Francesco Ciullo, Kewullay Conteh, Di Napoli, Valentino Lai, Filippo Maniero, Antonio Marasco, Francesco Modesto, Frank Ongfiang, Generoso Rossi, Mario Santana, Evans Soligo, Ighli Vannucchi and William Viali.

In summer 2003, he was loaned to Serie A side Chievo along with Mario Santana, with Eugenio Corini moved to opposite direction. On 1 July 2004, he returned to Palermo, which the team won Serie B and promoted to the Italian top division in June 2004.

=== Livorno ===
In July 2005, he was sold to Serie A side Livorno for €500,000.

=== Parma ===
In July 2007, Morrone was signed by Parma for €2.5 million.

In 2009–10 season, he was the starting central midfielder in 352 formation, or 433 formation. partnered mainly with Daniele Galloppa, Blerim Džemaili (until February), Francesco Valiani (since February as left midfielder) and Luis Jiménez (since February as attacking midfielder). He only played as substitute in round 5, suspended in round 19 and round 29. Since April, Morrone was rested due to injury. He was also the team captain. On 5 May, he was returned from training and played the match against Juventus on 9 May, which he was recovered in-time to replace Džemaili who suspended.

Morrone had a more injury-free season in 2010–11 and missed just four games as he captained the club to Serie A safety, but the Italian lost his place in the side towards the end of the following season under new coach Roberto Donadoni.

On 19 August 2013 Morrone was signed by U.S. Latina Calcio in a temporary deal.

On 14 July 2014 he was signed by A.C. Pisa 1909.

== International career ==
Morrone was call-up to 2000 Summer Olympics as backup player as Simone Perrotta was injured. He also played at 2000 UEFA European Under-21 Football Championship qualification, substituted Roberto Baronio, Gianni Comandini, Cristiano Zanetti respectively. In the last group stage match against Belarus U21 in October 1999, Morrone was in the starting XI, partnered with Roberto Baronio, Gennaro Gattuso and Andrea Pirlo in midfield.

In August 2006, he received a call-up from new Italy coach Roberto Donadoni against Croatia, but did not play. That match Giulio Falcone, Christian Terlizzi, Gennaro Delvecchio, Massimo Gobbi, Angelo Palombo and Tommaso Rocchi also received their first call-up.

== Coaching career ==
In 2015, he was named Allievi youth coach for the refounded Parma, then in Serie D and under the presidency of Nevio Scala. He was promoted as Primavera coach in 2016, and also served as caretaker for two games following the transition from Luigi Apolloni to Roberto D'Aversa.

He left Parma in the summer of 2017 to accept an offer from Sassuolo as a youth coach and later also managed the Primavera team. On 6 November 2019, Morrone was appointed assistant manager to Fabio Grosso at Brescia Calcio, whit whom he had been friends win for several years. However, after 3 games in charge and 0 points, the duo was fired on 2 December 2019.

== Career statistics ==
As of 16 May 2012

Club performance			League		Cup		Continental		Total	
Season	Club	League	Apps	Goals	Apps	Goals	Apps	Goals	Apps	Goals
Italy			League		Coppa Italia		Europe		Total	
1996–97	Cosenza	Serie B	1	0	0	0			1	0
1997–98	Cosenza	Serie C1	19	1	2	0			21	1
1998–99	Cosenza	Serie B	7	1	4	0			11	1
1998–99	Empoli	Serie A	24	0					24	0
1999–2000	Piacenza	Serie A	23	0	4	0			27	0
2000–01	Piacenza	Serie B	9	0	2	0			11	0
2000–01	Venezia	Serie B	13	1					13	1
2001–02	Venezia	Serie A	5	0	0	0			5	0
2001–02	Cosenza	Serie B	14	0					14	0
2002–03	Palermo	Serie B	35	5	3	0			38	5
2003–04	Chievo	Serie A	20	0	1	0			21	0
2004–05	Palermo	Serie A	23	0	4	0			27	0
2005–06	Livorno	Serie A	35	6	3	1			38	7
2006–07	Livorno	Serie A	37	1	2	0	8	0	47	1
2007–08	Parma	Serie A	36	3	1	0			37	3
2008–09	Parma	Serie B	35	3	2	1			37	4
2009–10	Parma	Serie A	31	1	0	0			31	1
2010–11	Parma	Serie A	34	1	2	0			36	1
2011–12	Parma	Serie A	30	1	1	0			36	1
Career total			431	24	31	0	8	0	436	25

== Honours ==
Cosenza

- Serie C1: 1997–98
