= Puccinelli =

Puccinelli is an Italian surname. Notable people with the surname include:

- Aldo Puccinelli (1920–1994), Italian footballer
- André Puccinelli (born 1948), Brazilian politician
- Angelo Puccinelli, Italian painter
- Dorothy Wagner Puccinelli (1901–1974), American artist
- George Puccinelli (1907–1956), American baseball player
- Keith Puccinelli (1950–2017), American artist
- Luca Puccinelli (born 1973), Italian footballer
- Placido Puccinelli (1609–1685), Italian Christian monk and historian
