= Andrea Guerra (footballer) =

Italian footballer and coach (born 1972)

Personal information
- Date of birth: 4 September 1972 (age 54)
- Place of birth: Bolzano, Italy
- Height: 1.79 m (5 ft 10 in)
- Position: Left-back

Team information
- Current team: Monza (assistant coach)

Youth career
- 1991–1992: Hellas Verona

Senior career*
Years	Team	Apps	(Gls)
1991–1994	Hellas Verona	35	(1)
1992–1993	→ Salernitana (loan)	28	(0)
1994–2001	ChievoVerona	157	(2)
2001–2003	Palermo	33	(0)
2002–2003	→ Venezia (loan)	21	(0)
2004–2006	Südtirol	63	(0)
2006–2007	Monza	23	(0)
2007–2008	Merano		
2008	Bolzano		
Total		360	(3)

Managerial career
- 2009–2011: Südtirol (youth)
- 2011–2012: Südtirol (assistant)
- 2012: Pescara (assistant)
- 2013: Spezia (assistant)
- 2015–2016: Südtirol (assistant)
- 2016–2017: Foggia (technical assistant)
- 2017–2018: Foggia (technical assistant)
- 2018–2021: Foggia (assistant)
- 2021–: Monza (assistant)
- * Club domestic league appearances and goals

Andrea Guerra (born 4 September 1972) is an Italian football coach and former player who is the assistant coach of Serie A club Monza. As a player, he played as a left-back.

== Career ==
Born in Bolzano, South Tyrol, Guerra started his career at Veneto club Hellas Verona. He made his Serie A debut on 15 September 1991, against Internazionale; he came on as a substitute for Marino Magrin in the 59th minute. He made his second appearance for Verona on 3 November 1991, against Parma, replacing Paolo Piubelli in the 53rd minute; the match ended in a 1–1 draw.

After Verona were relegated in June 1992, Guerra left for Serie C1 side Salernitana. In the 1993–94 season, Guerra returned to Verona, where he became a regular starter for the club in Serie B. In the 1994–95 season, he left for city rival and Serie B newcomers Chievo Verona. With Chievo, Guerra won an historic promotion to Serie A (the first one in the club's history) during the 2000–01 season, under coach Luigi Delneri, although he was injured and missed most of the season.

On 22 August 2001, Guerra left for Serie B newcomers Palermo in a co-ownership deal, where he played 33 times in the league.

After Maurizio Zamparini purchased the Sicily side in July, Zamparini bought some players from Venezia, the club which he had previously owned, and sent Palermo's Daniele Amerini and Guerra back to Venezia, along with Igor Budan and Evans Soligo, who had also been purchased from Venezia.

Guerra was not included in the squad for the 2003–04 season.

In 2004–05, Guerra left for his hometown club F.C. Südtirol, where he played for two seasons in Serie C2.

In July 2007, he was signed by Serie C1 side Monza.

The following season, he left for Eccellenza Trentino-Alto Adige/Südtirol side Merano, and in the 2008–09 season, he played for Serie D side Bolzano; both clubs are located in South Tyrol. In November, he was released.

== Managerial career ==
In 2015, Guerra was appointed assistant coach of Südtirol. He was appointed technical assistant of Foggia in 2016. On 28 May 2021, Guerra became assistant coach to Giovanni Stroppa at Monza.
