= Pietro Lorenzini =

Italian footballer

Personal information
- Date of birth: 17 March 1989 (age 37)
- Place of birth: Parma, Italy
- Height: 1.71 m (5 ft 7 in)
- Position: Striker

Team information
- Current team: A.S.D. San Secondo Parmense

Youth career
- 2005–2009: Parma

Senior career*
Years	Team	Apps	(Gls)
2006–2009	Parma	1	(0)
2008–2009	→ Bellaria (loan)	15	(3)
2009–2010	Carpenedolo	26	(2)
2010–2011	Crociati Noceto	7	(0)
2011–2012	Colorno	22	(6)
2012–2013	San Secondo Parmense	110	(70)

International career^{‡}
2004–2005	Italy U-16	4	(0)
- * Club domestic league appearances and goals as of 20:27, 5 May 2010 (UTC) ‡ National team caps and goals as of 29 April 2005

Pietro Lorenzini (born 17 March 1989 in Parma) is an Italian professional football player

He made his Serie A debut for Parma F.C. on 4 May 2008 in a game against Genoa C.F.C. when he came on as a substitute in the 83rd minute for Reginaldo.
