= Ferdinand Coly =

Senegalese footballer (born 1973)

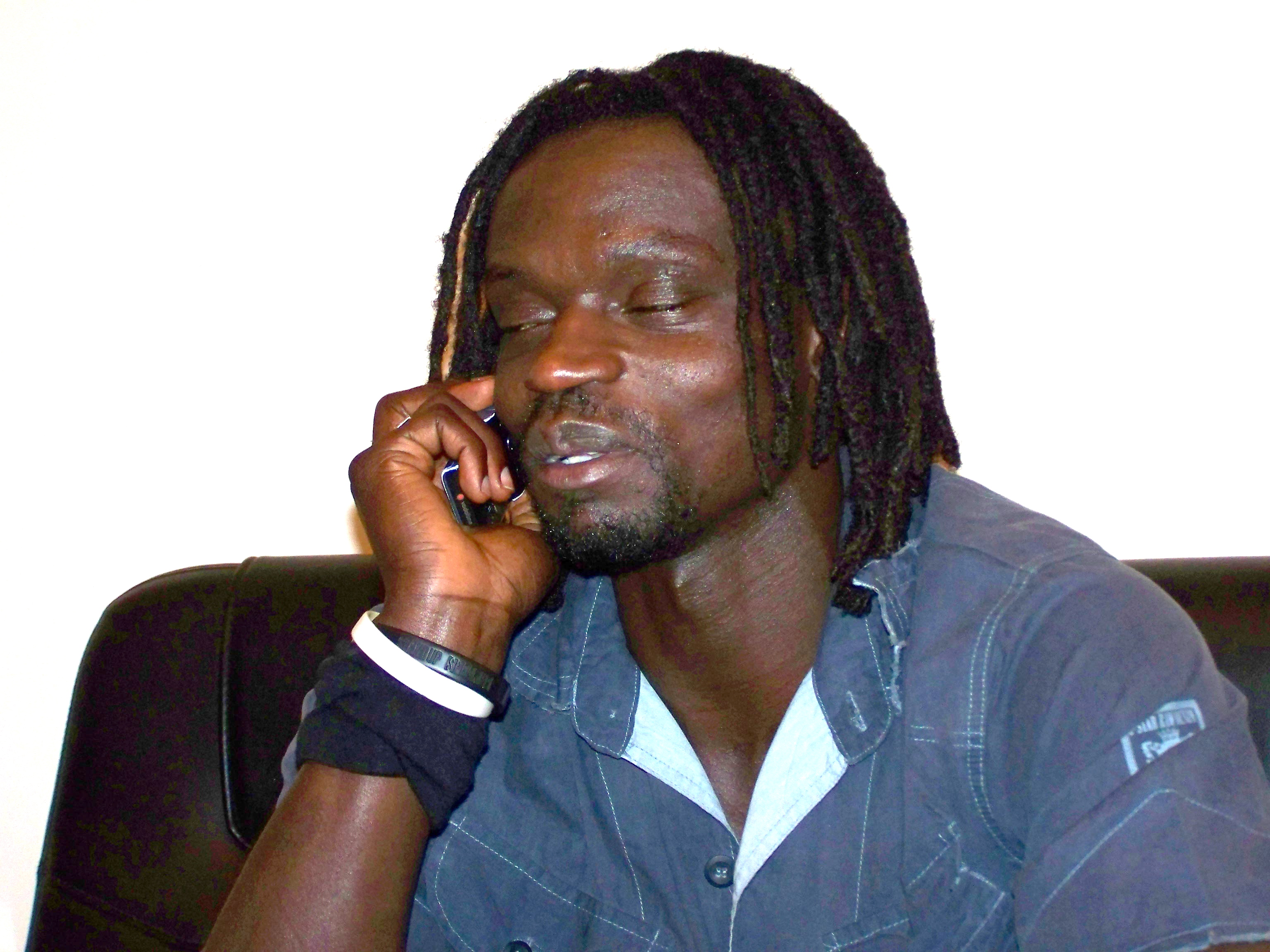
- Coly in 2008

Personal information
- Full name: Ferdinand Alexandre Coly
- Date of birth: 10 September 1973 (age 53)
- Place of birth: Dakar, Senegal
- Height: 5 ft 11 in (1.80 m)
- Position: Full-back

Senior career*
Years	Team	Apps	(Gls)
1993–1994	Libourne	29	(0)
1994–1996	Poitiers	66	(4)
1996–1999	Châteauroux	91	(8)
1999–2003	Lens	74	(2)
2003	→ Birmingham City (loan)	1	(0)
2003–2005	Perugia	41	(2)
2005–2008	Parma	56	(2)
Total		358	(18)

International career
2000–2007	Senegal	43	(0)
- * Club domestic league appearances and goals

Ferdinand Alexandre Coly (born 10 September 1973) is a Senegalese former professional footballer who played as a full-back.

Domestically, Coly primarily played in France, but also had a long stint in Italy. Internationally, he represented Senegal 43 times, including at the 2002 African Cup of Nations, in which Senegal reached the final, and the 2002 World Cup.

== Early life ==
Ferdinand Alexandre Coly was born on 10 September 1973 in Dakar, Senegal. His father, a soldier and UN peacekeeper, died in 1980, when Coly was only 7, after which his mother fell ill. Two years later, at the age of 9, Coly, alongside his younger brother Jean-Sébastien, was taken in by a French couple named Bernard and Irène Poncet, who lived in Artigues-près-Bordeaux. He grew up and was educated there, earning a baccalauréat in accounting and management at the age of 18, before enrolling at a local university to study psychology, though he would stop his studies after a year in order to pursue a career in football.

== Club career ==
=== Early career ===
Having not developed through an academy, Coly began his footballing career by joining local Nouvelle-Aquitaine side FC Libourne, who competed in the National 2 (the fourth tier of French football), for the 1993-94 season. After a year with the side, he was picked up by newly-promoted National outfit Stade Poitevin, who also offered him a civil service job in the town hall's legal department. In his first season in Poitiers, Coly helped the club once again win promotion, this time to Division 2, and was a staple in the side the following season, albeit that the club would be immediately relegated back to the National.

=== Châteauroux ===
Following Stade Poitevin's relegation, Coly returned to Division 2 by joining Châteauroux, signing his first ever professional contract with the club. During the 1996-97 season, Coly made 39 appearances for Châteauroux as they won promotion to Division 1. The following season, he made his first top flight appearance on the first matchday of the season, a away fixture against Paris Saint-Germain which his side would lose 2-0, before scoring his first Division 1 goal on 15 August in a 2-1 home loss to FC Metz. In total, Coly made 19 league appearance and netted 3 times as his side were relegated back to Division 2, and Coly remained with the club for one more season, during which he made 33 league appearances.

=== Lens ===
In the summer of 1999, Coly joined Division 1 side Lens. He was unable to play much in his first season with the side due to being sidelined for over six months with an initially misdiagnosed meniscus injury to his right knee, including missing out on the 2000 African Cup of Nations. For the following two seasons, however, he was a regular starter at the club, playing 28 and 26 matches respectively. After impressing at the 2002 FIFA World Cup, he began the season again with Lens, but only played 10 games for the side before relations soured between player and club, with Coly stating that Lens made it clear that he was no longer part of their future. As a result, he left to join English Premiership side Birmingham City on loan for the second half of the season.

==== Birmingham City (loan) ====
Coly agreed a deal to join Birmingham City on loan with an option to buy should the club avoid relegation, citing positive remarks from international teammate Aliou Cissé as his motivation for choosing the club. The deal was agreed in December 2002, but the player was only able to join the side on 1 January 2003, once the transfer window had opened. His time in England, however, would not be a success, with the player only making two appearances for the club: an FA Cup away defeat against Fulham in which he struggled to cope with the pace of Louis Saha, and a 4-0 home thrashing against Arsenal. Consequently, Birmingham City decided against taking up the option to buy, despite having stayed in the Premiership, but due to a clause in the loan contract stipulating that the player remain with the English side until he found a new club, he remained there until mid-August, when he agreed a mutual termination with the club.

=== Perugia ===
Coly joined Italian Serie A side Perugia on a one-year deal in late August 2003, but struggled for a place in the side and only made 11 league appearances as the side were relegated. He remained with the club in Serie B the following season, earning himself a starting spot and making 30 league appearances for the side, but unfortunately the season was not wholly positive for Coly, who found himself the target of racist abuse from Hellas Verona fans during a match against the club, which ultimately led to the side receiving a one-match stadium ban, the first punishment of such a kind handed out due to racism in Italian football history.

=== Parma ===
Coly left Perugia to return to the Serie A with Parma in the summer of 2005. After a difficult first season, in which he only made eight league appearances for the club, he became a regular starter for the following two seasons, albeit that at the beginning of the 2007-08 season he received a three game suspension for elbowing Torino player Cesare Natali in an act judged to be "unnecessary" and "intentional" by the Italian footballing authorities.

At the end of the 2007-08 season, Coly's contract was not renewed by the Italian club, and he briefly found himself a free agent, before deciding to retire and call a day on his playing career.

== International career ==
Coly made his Senegal debut in a 2002 FIFA World Cup qualification fixture against Algeria on 16 June 2000, and would go on to become a regular fixture in his birth country's national team for the next 7 years. In 2002, he represented Senegal in the African Cup of Nations and played in all of his national side's matches in the FIFA World Cup, as they reached the quarter finals. He continued representing Senegal regularly for the next five years, playing his final game for Les Lions de la Teranga in a September 2007 win over Burkina Faso in 2008 African Cup of Nations qualifying and earning a total of 43 caps for his national team.

== Post-retirement ==
Following his playing career, Coly remained with the Senegal national team for several years in an organisational capacity. He has since left football entirely, and is now a farmer in M’bour.
