= Antonio Filippini =

Italian footballer (born 1973)

Personal information
- Full name: Antonio Filippini
- Date of birth: 3 July 1973 (age 53)
- Place of birth: Brescia, Italy
- Height: 1.68 m (5 ft 6 in)
- Position: Midfielder

Team information
- Current team: Pavia (head coach)

Youth career
- 1991–1992: Brescia

Senior career*
Years	Team	Apps	(Gls)
1992–2003	Brescia	265	(15)
1992–1995	→ Ospitaletto (loan)	93	(8)
2004–2005	Palermo	21	(2)
2004–2005	→ Lazio (loan)	36	(2)
2005–2006	Treviso	32	(0)
2006–2010	Livorno	110	(4)
2010–2011	Brescia	15	(0)
Total		572	(31)

Managerial career
- 2011–2012: Brescia B
- 2012–2014: FeralpiSalò (youth)
- 2016: Lumezzane
- 2017–2018: Trento
- 2020: Livorno
- 2021: Pro Sesto
- 2023–2024: Genoa Women
- 2025–: Pavia
- * Club domestic league appearances and goals

Antonio Filippini (born 3 July 1973) is an Italian football coach and a former player who played mainly as a defensive midfielder, currently in charge as head coach of club Pavia.

He played in several teams with his twin brother, Emanuele, and spent most of his extensive career with Brescia, amassing Serie A totals of 303 games and 12 goals over the course of 11 seasons.

== Football career ==
Filippini was born in Brescia. Having emerged through hometown Brescia Calcio's youth system, he stayed there for eight professional seasons, after having started – on loan – with amateurs Ospitaletto, the first of many teams he shared with his sibling Emanuele. The pair made their Serie A debut on 31 August 1997, in a 1–2 away loss against Inter Milan.

In January 2004, Filippini moved to the Serie B with U.S. Città di Palermo. He was crucial to the Sicilians' promotion, with 21 matches in only five months.

After a solid campaign with S.S. Lazio and a year with lowly Treviso F.B.C. 1993, Filippini signed with A.S. Livorno Calcio on a free transfer in 2006, being rejoined by Emanuele (also his teammate at Lazio and Treviso) the following year and helping the side return to the top flight in his third season, with 24 matches and one goal.

Filippini rejoined Brescia's for 2010–11, after 18 years. Following the team's top-level relegation, he retired in June 2011 at the age of 38.

=== Coaching career ===
On 25 June 2012, it was announced that both brothers would join lower league club FeralpiSalò as youth system coordinators.

He successively served as the head coach of Lumezzane in 2016, then managing Serie D club Trento from November 2017 to March 2018.

In November 2019, he was appointed assistant coach at Livorno. On 8 March 2020, with the club at the bottom of the Serie B league table, he was promoted to head coach, replacing Roberto Breda. He was dismissed following Livorno's relegation to Serie C at the end of the 2019–20 season.

On 29 March 2021, he was hired by Serie C club Pro Sesto. He was sacked on 19 September 2021 following a negative start in the 2021–22 Serie C campaign.

On 3 January 2023, Filippini was announced as the new head coach of Genoa Women of the Italian women's football Serie B league. He left the club in June 2024.

On 17 October 2025, Filippini was hired as the new head coach of Serie D club Pavia.
