= Balilla Lombardi =

Italian footballer (1916–1987)

Personal information
- Date of birth: 1 April 1916
- Place of birth: Rome, Italy
- Date of death: 3 March 1987 (aged 70)
- Height: 1.72 m (5 ft 7 1/2 in)
- Position: Midfielder

Senior career*
Years	Team	Apps	(Gls)
1932–1935	Roma	9	(0)
1935–1936	Pistoiese	30	(8)
1936–1937	Bari	3	(0)
1937–1938	Palermo	32	(12)
1938–1940	Venezia	32	(6)
1940–1941	Anconitana	11	(1)
1941–1944	M.A.T.E.R.		
1944–1945	Roma	7	(3)
1945–1946	Forlì		
1946–1947	Palermo	20	(?)
1948–1949	Grosseto	23	(1)
- * Club domestic league appearances and goals

Balilla Lombardi (1 April 1916 – 3 March 1987) was an Italian professional football player.

He played 4 seasons (17 games, 1 goal) in the Serie A for A.S. Roma, A.S. Bari and A.C. Venezia. Lombardi died in March 1987 at the age of 70.
