= Emanuele Filippini =

Italian retired footballer (born 1973)

Personal information
- Full name: Emanuele Filippini
- Date of birth: 3 July 1973 (age 53)
- Place of birth: Brescia, Italy
- Height: 1.68 m (5 ft 6 in)
- Position: Midfielder

Team information
- Current team: Italy U19 (assistant)

Youth career
- 1990–1992: Brescia

Senior career*
Years	Team	Apps	(Gls)
1992–2003	Brescia	200	(5)
1992–1995	→ Ospitaletto (loan)	87	(5)
2002–2003	→ Parma (loan)	42	(3)
2004–2005	Palermo	20	(4)
2004–2005	→ Lazio (loan)	27	(0)
2005–2007	Treviso	30	(2)
2006–2007	→ Bologna (loan)	37	(2)
2007–2009	Livorno	30	(1)
Total		473	(22)

Managerial career
- 2013: Kenya U20
- 2016: Adrense
- 2016–2017: Ciliverghe
- 2017: Imolese
- 2017–2018: Rezzato
- * Club domestic league appearances and goals

Emanuele Filippini (born 3 July 1973) is an Italian retired footballer who played as a defensive midfielder, currently working as an assistant coach for the Italy national under-19 football team.

He played in several teams with his twin brother, Antonio, and spent most of his career with Brescia, amassing Serie A totals of 175 games and six goals over the course of eight seasons.

== Playing career ==
Born in Brescia, Filippini emerged through his hometown Brescia Calcio's youth system, and stayed there for eight professional seasons, after having started – on loan – with amateurs Ospitaletto, the first of many teams he shared with his sibling Antonio. The pair made their Serie A debut on 31 August 1997, in a 1–2 away loss against Inter Milan.

After one-and-a-half seasons on loan to Parma AC, Filippini moved alongside Antonio to U.S. Città di Palermo. He scored four goals in his short spell, to help the Sicilian side return to the top division after 31 years.

Filippini then hard three more solid campaigns, one each with S.S. Lazio, Treviso F.B.C. 1993 and Bologna F.C. 1909 (the first two with Antonio, the latter in the second division), before signing with A.S. Livorno Calcio in 2007. In his second season he appeared in only a handful of games – unlike his twin, who had joined the previous year – but helped the club in the successful promotion play-offs, after which he was released, at nearly 36, retiring shortly after.

== Coaching career ==
In late January 2010, Brescia appointed Filippini as assistant coach of the Giovanissimi Nazionali youth team guided by Omar Danesi. On 25 June 2012, it was announced that both brothers would join lowly FeralpiSalò as youth system coordinators.

In July 2012, he was awarded the UEFA Pro Licence in 2012. He subsequently served as Kenya U20 head coach for a short time in 2013. In February 2016 he took over as head coach of Promozione Lombardy amateurs Adrense.

In June 2016, Filippini was hired as head coach of Serie D amateurs Ciliverghe. In June 2017 he took over as head coach of Serie D club Imolese, but resigned later on in September, two days before the first game of the season, for personal reasons. In October 2017, he was hired as the new boss of Rezzato, another Serie D club.

In August 2018, he accepted an offer from the Italian Football Federation to work as Carmine Nunziata's assistant in charge of the U17 national team. Both Nunziata and Filippini were successively promoted in charge of the U19 national team in July 2020.
