= Cristian Agnelli =

Italian professional footballer (born 1985)

Personal information
- Full name: Cristian Antonio Agnelli
- Date of birth: 23 September 1985 (age 41)
- Place of birth: Foggia, Italy
- Height: 1.74 m (5 ft 9 in)
- Position: Midfielder

Youth career
- Foggia

Senior career*
Years	Team	Apps	(Gls)
2002–2003	Foggia	1	(0)
2003–2010	Lecce	0	(0)
2003–2005	→ Verona (loan)	30	(1)
2005	→ Catanzaro (loan)	12	(0)
2005–2006	→ Juve Stabia (loan)	32	(3)
2006–2007	→ Salernitana (loan)	27	(2)
2007–2008	→ Benevento (loan)	33	(3)
2008–2009	→ Sorrento (loan)	23	(3)
2010	Foggia	12	(0)
2010–2011	Barletta	19	(0)
2011–2012	SPAL	32	(2)
2012–2019	Foggia	187	(18)
2019–2020	Pergolettese	23	(2)
2020–2021	FC Messina	18	(2)
2021–2022	Audace Cerignola	29	(2)

International career
2004	Italy U19	4	(0)
2004–2005	Italy U20	6	(0)
2005	Italy U21	3	(0)
- * Club domestic league appearances and goals as of 29 May 2022

Cristian Antonio Agnelli (born 23 September 1985) is an Italian professional footballer who plays as a midfielder.

== Career ==
=== Club career ===
Agnelli began his professional career with hometown club Foggia, making his debut in May 2002. He signed for Lecce in January 2003 and spent loan spells at Verona, Catanzaro, Juve Stabia, Salernitana and Benevento.

Agnelli was released from his contract with Lecce in January 2010, six months early. He consequently returned to Foggia on 6-month contract.

On 7 August 2010, Agnelli signed a 1-year contract with Barletta. On 28 August 2012, he re-joined Foggia again.

On 12 September 2019, he signed with Pergolettese.

On 1 September 2021, he moved to Audace Cerignola.

=== International career ===
Agnelli participated at the 2005 FIFA World Youth Championship.
