= Antonino Asta =

Italian footballer and manager (born 1970)

Personal information
- Full name: Antonino Asta
- Date of birth: 17 November 1970 (age 55)
- Place of birth: Alcamo, Italy
- Height: 1.74 m (5 ft 8 1/2 in)
- Position: Midfielder

Youth career
- 1984–1985: Aldini U.N.E.S.
- 1985–1988: Seguro S.Giorgio

Senior career*
Years	Team	Apps	(Gls)
1989–1991	Corbetta	63	(11)
1991–1992	Abbiategrasso	25	(1)
1992–1995	Saronno	91	(17)
1995–1997	Monza	60	(7)
1997–2000	Torino	73	(3)
2000	Napoli	15	(2)
2000–2002	Torino	55	(4)
2002–2004	Palermo	24	(3)

International career
2002	Italy	1	(0)

Managerial career
- 2005–2007: Torino (Allievi Regionali)
- 2007–2009: Torino (Nazionali)
- 2009–2012: Torino (Primavera)
- 2012–2014: Monza
- 2014–2015: Bassano Virtus
- 2015: Lecce
- 2016–2017: FeralpiSalò
- 2017–2018: Teramo
- 2018–2019: Pistoiese
- 2020: Torino (staff)
- * Club domestic league appearances and goals

Antonino Asta (Italian pronunciation: [antoˈniːno ˈasta]; born 17 November 1970) is an Italian football manager and former football player.

He played as a right winger during his career, although he was a versatile player capable of playing anywhere in midfield. As a player, he was mainly known for his speed, work-rate, tactical intelligence, and leadership.

== Club career ==
Asta, a midfielder, played mostly at the amateur level in his early footballing years, also working as a bartender. During the 1994–95 season, played with Saronno, was his first one in a professional league (Serie C2). He then played for Monza of Serie C1; in 1997, Asta signed for Torino of Serie B, where he became a fan favourite, eventually becoming the team's captain during his time with the club; he helped his team to obtain a Serie A promotion in 1999. In January 2000, Asta was sent on loan to Napoli of Serie B, helping the club to gain promotion to Serie A; the following season, he led Torino to Serie A promotion, winning the Serie B title with the club.

During the 2001–02 Serie A season, Antonino Asta impressed many football pundits with his performances, captaining Torino to place in the 2002 UEFA Intertoto Cup, and making 25 appearances with the team, despite picking up an injury in the Derby della mole return leg against local rivals and eventual Serie A champions Juventus, after being tackled harshly by Edgar Davids. As a result, Italy national football team head coach Giovanni Trapattoni called him up to the national side, and gave him his debut during a pre-World Cup friendly match against U.S.A., in Catania, on 13 February 2002, which Italy won 1–0, with a goal from Alessandro Del Piero; this was his only appearance for Italy.

For the 2002–03 season, after his contract with Torino had expired, ambitious Serie B club Palermo signed him on a free transfer; Asta, a key player for the team, however experienced a serious ankle injury during the last league match of the season, against Lecce, and did not manage to recover, missing out on Palermo's defeat in the Serie A play-off match, as they finished the season in fourth place. He retired in 2004, after Palermo won the Serie B title, winning promotion to Serie A the following season, despite failing to make an appearance throughout the season due to his injury.

== Managerial career ==
In the summer of 2005, he embarked on a career as a manager, starting with the Allievi Regionali of the Torino youth after the club's bankruptcy.

The next season, he was confirmed as manager of the same youth category, while in the 2007–08 season he was promoted to manager of the Allievi Nazionali. He remained at the helm of the Allievi Nazionali for the 2008–09 season, reaching the final round, but eliminated in the round before the final.

For the 2009–10 season he was promoted to head of the Torino Primavera. Early in the season, in Siena–Torino (3–0), he was sent-off after just a minute of the game. The season ended with a mid-table finish.

He continued with the Primavera for the 2010–11 season, finishing fourth place in the standings and participated in the Final Eight, where Torino was defeated in the quarter-finals by Inter Milan on penalties. In 2011–2012 he brought the Primavera to second place in the group behind Juventus, but lost the first game of the Final Eight for the Scudetto against Lazio.

On 29 June 2012 he became the coach of Monza in Lega Pro Seconda Divisione, the team in which he played for two years between 1995 and 1997. Although the team had a six-point penalty, he led Monza to a fifth place in the league and a place in the playoffs; without the penalty points his team would have won the division. Here, Monza eliminated Bassano Virtus in the semifinals, but was eliminated in the final by Venezia.

On 23 June 2014 he was appointed new head coach of Bassano Virtus in the Italian third tier. He left the club one year later in June 2015.

On 6 July 2015 he was named successor of Alberto Bollini as head coach of U.S. Lecce. He was sacked in October 2015.

On 23 October 2018 he was appointed head coach of Serie C club Pistoiese.

On 6 February 2020, Asta returned to Torino, this time as a part of new manager Moreno Longo's first team staff. Longo and his staff, including Asta, was fired on 7 August 2020.

== Honours ==
=== Club ===
Torino

- Serie B: 2000–01

Palermo

- Serie B: 2003–04
