= Andrea Gasbarroni =

Italian footballer (born 1981)

Personal information
- Date of birth: 6 August 1981 (age 45)
- Place of birth: Turin, Italy
- Height: 1.75 m (5 ft 9 in)
- Position: Midfielder

Youth career
- 1998–2001: Juventus

Senior career*
Years	Team	Apps	(Gls)
2001–2002	Juventus	0	(0)
2001–2002	→ Varese (loan)	27	(6)
2002–2003	Sampdoria	21	(2)
2003–2006	Palermo	48	(6)
2005–2006	→ Sampdoria (loan)	39	(5)
2006–2007	Juventus	0	(0)
2006–2007	→ Parma (loan)	29	(6)
2007–2008	Parma	26	(5)
2008	Genoa	10	(0)
2009–2012	Torino	69	(2)
2012–2015	Monza	53	(25)
2015–2016	Giana Erminio	37	(4)
2016–2017	Pinerolo	27	(7)
2017–2018	Bra	30	(4)
Total		416	(69)

International career
2002–2004	Italy U-21	11	(2)
2004	Olympic Italy	3	(0)
Medal record
Representing Italy
Olympic Games
Men's Football
Bronze medal – third place	2004 Athens	Team competition
- * Club domestic league appearances and goals as of 10 December 2017

Andrea Gasbarroni Cavaliere OMRI (born 6 August 1981) is an Italian former professional footballer who played as a midfielder.

== Club career ==
=== Juventus ===
An attacking midfielder who can also play occasionally as a winger or second striker, Gasbarroni started his career at Juventus FC youth team, but after graduate from Primavera team, he was loaned to Varese, later sold to Sampdoria in joint-ownership bid. In summer 2003, he was transferred to Palermo in another co-ownership deal for about €1.3 million and bought back in June 2006 for an undisclosed fee.

=== Parma ===
After Marco Marchionni joined Juventus on a free transfer, Gasbarroni joined Parma on loan.

He was sold to Parma F.C. outright for €1.5 million in 2007.

=== Genoa ===
Genoa signed Gasbarroni in July 2008, for €2 million, as well as half of the card of Magnus Troest for €1.5 million, with Julio César de León joined Parma for €2.9 million and Alessandro Lucarelli for €1.2 million.

=== Torino ===
On 2 February 2009, Torino F.C. engaged the offensive wing in a co-ownership deal from Genoa, for €500,000. The move became permanent in June 2009 after Genoa declined to make an offer to buy back the remaining half of the player's registration rights.

=== Monza ===
On 23 January 2015, Gasbarroni was released by Monza.

== International career ==
Gasbarroni was in the Italian Olympic squad that won the bronze medal at the 2004 Summer Olympics football tournament.

== Honours ==
Orders

- 5th Class / Knight: Cavaliere Ordine al Merito della Repubblica Italiana: 2004
