= Gianni De Rosa =

Italian footballer

Personal information
- Full name: Giovanni De Rosa
- Date of birth: 19 September 1956
- Place of birth: Cerignola, Italy
- Date of death: 2 August 2008 (aged 51)
- Place of death: Rimini, Italy
- Height: 1.77 m (5 ft 9 1/2 in)
- Position: Striker

Youth career
- AC Milan

Senior career*
Years	Team	Apps	(Gls)
1974–1977	Lecco	20	(2)
1976–1977	→ Massese (loan)	29	(11)
1977–1980	Ternana	78	(15)
1980–1981	Perugia	22	(4)
1981	Como	6	(1)
1981–1983	Palermo	61	(29)
1983–1984	Napoli	?	(?)
1984–1986	Cagliari	?	(?)
1986–?	Rimini	?	(?)
- * Club domestic league appearances and goals

Giovanni "Gianni" De Rosa (19 September 1956 – 2 August 2008) was an Italian football striker who played at Serie A level with Napoli, Como and Perugia, also winning a Serie B topscorer title in 1981 as a Palermo player.

== Career ==
Born in Cerignola, Province of Foggia, he made his professional debut in 1974 with Serie C side Lecco. After a season out on loan at Massese, he was signed by Ternana, where he spent three seasons. In 1980, he made his Serie A debut with Perugia. After a short spell with Como, he was signed by Serie B club Palermo, where he spent two successful seasons, scoring a total of 29 goals and winning a top scorer title in 1981. He then returned to the Italian top flight in 1983, with Napoli, where he spent a single season before moving to Cagliari. He then finally moved to Rimini in his final appearance as a professional player. After his retirement, he settled in Riccione.

Gianni De Rosa died on 2 August 2008, in a road accident in Rimini, as his motorcycle was struck by a bus at night.
