= Luca Puccinelli =

Italian footballer and agent

Luca Puccinelli (born 11 July 1973 in Viareggio, Province of Lucca) is an Italian retired footballer and agent. He played as a midfielder. After playing in Sampdoria youth teams he played mainly in Serie C1 and Serie C2. During his career he had to face many injuries that in the end forced him to retire from football. Nowadays he is an important football agent and he assists many successful players including Alessandro Diamanti, Alberto Gilardino, Aleandro Rosi and Nicolao Dumitru. He was born in Viareggio but he travelled a lot during his life because of his career. He is married and has two children.

== Career ==
1992-1994 Viareggio 20 (5)
1994-1996 Empoli 48 (5)
1996-1998 Siena 44 (3)
1998-2000 Palermo 45 (5)
2000-2001 Savoia 22 (0)
2001-2002 Pescara 19 (2)
2003-2004 Brindisi 32 (5)
2004 Torres 9 (0)
2004-2005 Novara 21 (0)
2005-2006 Perugia 21 (0)
