= Francesco Ciullo =

Italian professional footballer

Francesco Ciullo (born 30 September 1979 in Marghera) is an Italian former professional footballer who played as a forward.

== Football career ==
Ciullo started playing professional football in 1997 with his hometown team S.S.C. Venezia. The next season, he went out to Sandonà (Serie C2), where he played 32 games and he scored 10 goals.

After a year Ciullo returned to Venezia team, with which he played two games, but did not score any goals.

The next season, Ciullo was engaged by A.C. Reggiana, and had a productive Lega Pro Prima Divisione season with his new club, scoring one goal in ten league games.

Ciullo later signed on with Ascoli Calcio where he played 24 games and scored one goal. Next year Ciullo changed again, to play with the U.S. Triestina Calcio team (Lega Pro Prima Divisione). Here he played for three years making 40 appearances and scoring 8 goals.

After two years with Arezzo team and Pavia team, Triestina bought him again and he returned to his old team where he collected a presence even in Serie B. After this bad experience he tried to return to play in the Pro League First Division and Pisa Calcio engaged him. In Pisa he played in 15 games.

After some bad seasons, Ciullo went to play in Series D with the Jesolo team. He is one of the reserve players in the Jesolo but comes into play when needed and does a nice work. In the current season Francesco Ciullo made over three goals even though he played very little, and he is proving one of the strongest players in the series.
