= Dante Di Maso =

Italian footballer and manager (1924-2005)

Personal information
- Date of birth: July 23, 1924
- Place of birth: Turin, Italy
- Date of death: 2005 (aged 81)
- Place of death: Turin, Italy
- Position: Winger

Senior career*
Years	Team	Apps	(Gls)
????–1947	Lancia Torino	?	(?)
1947–1948	Palermo	6	(1)
1948–1949	Arsenale Messina	23	(9)
1949–1955	Palermo	158	(41)
1955–1957	Foligno	?	(?)
- * Club domestic league appearances and goals

Dante Di Maso (23 July 1924 – 2005) was an Italian football player and manager. Di Maso spent the vast majority of his career in Sicily where he was a prominent figure in the footballing scene, especially in relation to the island's most successful club, Palermo.

A winger, Di Maso scored 40 goals in Serie A with the rosanero shirt of Palermo. This record was broken in the 2009-10 season by Fabrizio Miccoli.
