= Carlo Radice =

Italian footballer (1907–1976)

Personal information
- Date of birth: December 16, 1907
- Place of birth: Monza, Italy
- Position: Striker

Senior career*
Years	Team	Apps	(Gls)
1925–1926	Monza	11	(3)
1927–1928	Virtus Goliarda	?	(?)
1928–1929	Lazio	5	(2)
1929–1933	Palermo	84+	(64)
1933–1934	Catanzarese	12	(6)
1934–1935	Palermo	1	(0)
1935–1936	Falck	23	(7)
- * Club domestic league appearances and goals

Carlo Radice (born 16 December 1907, in Monza – 9 May 1976) was a former Italian footballer. Radice was nicknamed "Il Vichingo" ("The Viking") by virtue of his Nordic appearance.
