= Gaetano Troja =

Italian footballer (1944–2023)

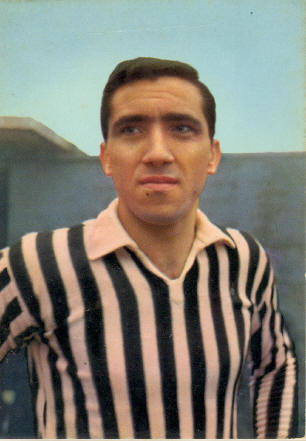
- Troja in the 1960s with Palermo

Personal information
- Date of birth: 25 July 1944
- Place of birth: Palermo, Italy
- Date of death: 19 June 2023 (aged 78)
- Place of death: Palermo, Italy
- Height: 1.80 m (5 ft 11 in)
- Position(s): Forward

Senior career*
Years	Team	Apps	(Gls)
?–1963	Faldese		
1963–1964	Paternò	29	(15)
1964–1966	Palermo	66	(20)
1966–1968	Brescia	58	(13)
1968–1973	Palermo	112	(23)
1973–1974	Napoli	4	(0)
1974–1976	Bari	46	(11)
1976–1977	Catania	12	(1)
1977–1978	Lignano		(10)
- * Club domestic league appearances and goals

Gaetano Troja (25 July 1944 – 19 June 2023) was an Italian footballer who played as a forward for Palermo, Brescia, Napoli, Bari and Catania. He played seven seasons with Palermo, three in Serie A and four in Serie B, scoring 43 goals and becoming one of the most beloved players in the team's history.

== Biography ==
=== Football career ===
Described as an individual with a rocky physique, Troja began his life of football playing for Faldese, a Palermitan team based at the foot of Mount Pellegrino. Beginning at age 16, he played as a starter in Promozione, with which he became the top scorer of the group. The following year he moved to Paternò in Serie D, where played a great season and after which, was bought by Palermo in 1964 for 80 million lire.

Troja made his league debut on 13 September 1964 against Trani, a match in which he immediately made a major score for the 3–0 aggregate. He closed the first season with 8 overall goals, 6 of which in the first round. In the return he only scored in the match against Modena (2–0), making a brace. In the following season he scored 2 goals in 2 matches in the Italian Cup, against Reggiana and Fiorentina respectively. While in the league he scored 12 times, making him the season's top scorer for the Rosanero team. He went on to make memorable braces against: Monza (4–0) and Padova (1–3). Troja has been dubbed as one of the best Palermo players of all time.

In 1966, he was sold to Brescia for budgetary reasons. He then returned to Palermo in 1968 and was promoted to Serie A. In the 1969–1970 championship against Gigi Riva's Cagliari, Troja scored a memorable diving header. In 1973, after Palermo's relegation to Serie B, he moved to Napoli, where he failed to establish himself despite playing 4 games in the league. A year later he went to Bari, being downgraded to Serie C.

In 1976, while he was negotiating with Udinese who always played in Serie C, coach Carmelo Di Bella, Troja's coach during his time at Palermo, went to see him in his boutique in Lignano Sabbiadoro, where Catania was having their summer training camp, and in just three hours he convinced him to wear the rossazzurri (red and blue) colors for the 1976–1977 season in Serie B. He went on to play in the Derby di Sicilia; in the first game played at Cibali, he was replaced, and in the second game played at Favoritahe, he refused to take the field, watching the whole game (which ended 0–0) from the grandstand.

In his career he had a total of 133 appearances and 21 goals in Serie A and 119 appearances and 36 goals in Serie B.

=== Futsal career ===
After retiring from football, he devoted himself to futsal, and led Pro Ficuzza to the championship finals.

=== As manager ===
He was chief observer of Palermo F.C. when the team was owned by the Roman businessman Franco Sensi from 2000 to 2001. In that year, the Sicilian team was playing in Serie C1 and at the end they obtained promotion to Serie B in the 2001 to 2002 season.

=== Death ===
Troja died from complications of diabetes in Palermo on 19 June 2023. He was 78.
