= Enzo Ferrari (Italian footballer) =

Italian footballer and manager (1942–2025)

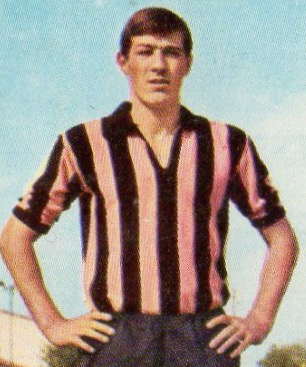
- Ferrari in 1969

Personal information
- Date of birth: 21 October 1942
- Place of birth: San Donà di Piave, Italy
- Date of death: 11 May 2025 (aged 82)
- Position: Forward

Senior career*
Years	Team	Apps	(Gls)
1961–1963	Sandonà	11	(2)
1963–1964	Forlì	32	(4)
1964–1967	Arezzo	79	(18)
1967–1968	Genoa	36	(14)
1968–1973	Palermo	126	(22)
1976–1977	Clodiasottomarina	31	(4)

Managerial career
- 1978–1979: Conegliano Calcio
- 1980–1984: Udinese
- 1984–1985: Real Zaragoza
- 1985–1988: Triestina
- 1988: Avellino
- 1989: Padova
- 1991: Palermo
- 1992–1994: Reggina
- 1994–1995: Reggiana
- 1995–1997: Alessandria
- 1998–2001: Ascoli
- 2001–2002: Arezzo
- * Club domestic league appearances and goals

Enzo Ferrari (21 October 1942 – 11 May 2025) was an Italian professional footballer and manager.

== Playing career ==
As a footballer, he played in Serie A with Palermo; on 12 January 1969, in Rome, he scored a famous goal from a distance of 77 metres.

== Coaching career ==
As a coach, he trained Udinese in Serie A and then Real Zaragoza, in La Liga.

After several experiences in Serie A, B and C1 he later became the general director of Triestina.

== Death ==
Ferrari died on 11 May 2025, at the age of 82.
