= John Olufemi =

Nigerian footballer

Personal information
- Full name: John Olufemi Otuagomah Sfondo
- Date of birth: April 7, 1984 (age 42)
- Place of birth: Lagos, Nigeria
- Height: 1.83 m (6 ft 0 in)
- Position: Striker

Senior career*
Years	Team	Apps	(Gls)
2002–2004	Palermo	2	(0)
2004	→ Venezia (loan)	6	(0)
2005	→ Potenza (loan)	6	(0)
2005	→ Venezia (loan)	11	(2)
2006	→ Rovigo (loan)	6	(0)
2007	Bellinzona	4	(1)
2008–2009	Locarno	0	(0)
- * Club domestic league appearances and goals

John Olufemi Otuagomah Sfondo (born 7 April 1984 in Lagos) is a Nigerian footballer.

== Career ==
Olufemi was on loan to Rovigo from Palermo in summer 2006, but in January 2007, he left for Bellinzona. He then transferred to FC Locarno in February 2008, in a deal effective as of summer 2008.
