= Manolo Pestrin =

Italian footballer

Personal information
- Date of birth: 13 October 1978 (age 48)
- Place of birth: Rome, Italy
- Height: 1.76 m (5 ft 9 in)
- Position: Midfielder

Senior career*
Years	Team	Apps	(Gls)
1996–1997	Monterotondo		
1997–2000	Castel di Sangro	41	(1)
2000–2002	Lanciano	71	(4)
2003	Palermo	4	(0)
2003–2007	Cesena	107	(6)
2007	→ Messina (loan)	16	(0)
2007–2008	Messina	19	(1)
2008–2011	Salernitana	48	(2)
2010	→ Torino (loan)	9	(0)
2011	Frosinone	17	(0)
2011–2012	Cremonese	29	(1)
2012–2013	Carrarese	20	(0)
2013–2014	Ascoli	19	(0)
2014–2016	Salernitana	64	(1)
2016–2017	Paganese	31	(0)
2017–2018	San Marino	28	(0)
2018–2019	Tre Fiori	23	(1)

Managerial career
- 2020: Rieti (assistant)
- 2020–2023: Salernitana (Assistant coach)
- * Club domestic league appearances and goals

Manolo Pestrin (born 13 October 1978) is a retired Italian footballer who played as a midfielder.

== Career ==
=== Club career ===
Born in Rome, capital of Italy and Lazio region, Pestrin started his career at Roman club Monterotondo. He was signed by Lanciano in 2000. In January 2003 Pestrin left for Palermo, which 6 months later he was signed by Cesena in co-ownership deal.

Pestrin spent 3 1/2 seasons in the Romagna club. In January 2007 Pestrin left for Messina in temporary deal. In mid-2007 Messina signed him outright. However the club bankrupted in 2008. He joined Salernitana as free agent.

In January 2011 Pestrin was signed by Frosinone, with Salvatore Aurelio moved to opposite direction. In 2011, he was swapped with Matías Miramontes.

In 2012, he was signed by Carrarese. In 2013, he was signed by Ascoli. On 30 January 2014 he returned to Salernitana.

=== Coaching career ===
On 11 February 2020, Pestrin was appointed assistant coach under newly appointed manager, Alberto Mariani, at F.C. Rieti. On 20 August 2020, Pestrin joined Salernitana as a technical collaborator under his former Lanciano and Cesena manager, Fabrizio Castori. Pestrin, who at the time was under manager Davide Nicola's staff, was fired alongside the manager in February 2023.
