= Franck Ongfiang =

Cameroonian footballer

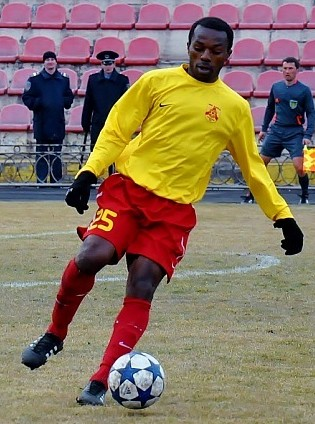
- Ongfiang in 2014

Personal information
- Full name: Franck Olivier Ongfiang
- Date of birth: 6 April 1985 (age 41)
- Place of birth: Yaoundé, Cameroon
- Height: 1.72 m (5 ft 8 in)
- Position: Midfielder

Youth career
- Bordeaux
- 2001–2002: Venezia
- 2002–2003: Palermo

Senior career*
Years	Team	Apps	(Gls)
2002	Venezia	1	(0)
2002–2005	Palermo	4	(0)
2003–2004	→ Cesena (loan)	12	(1)
2004–2005	→ Martina (loan)	23	(1)
2005–2008	Espérance de Tunis		
2006–2007	→ Al Ain (loan)		
2007–2008	→ Sharjah SC (loan)		
2008–2010	Al Ahly Tripoli		
2010–2011	Zirka Kirovohrad	20	(0)
2011–2012	Sheikh Russel KC		
2013	Benfica Luanda		
2014	Sriwijaya	15	(1)

International career
2005	Cameroon U20		
2007	Cameroon U23		
- * Club domestic league appearances and goals

Franck Olivier Ongfiang (born 6 April 1985) is a Cameroonian former professional footballer who played as a midfielder.

== Club career ==
=== Early career and Italy ===
Born in Yaoundé, Ongfiang started his European career at France for Bordeaux. In the 2001–02 season, he was signed by Venezia and made his Serie A debut on 17 March 2002 against Chievo, substituted Arturo Di Napoli in the last minutes. The match ended in 1–1 draw. At that time he was the 4th all-time youngest Serie A foreign player, after Valeri Bojinov, Lampros Choutos and Claiton.

In August 2002, after Venezia's owner Maurizio Zamparini purchased Palermo, he followed his team-mates likes Di Napoli, Kewullay Conteh, Mario Santana, Igor Budan, Stefano Morrone and Daniel Andersson, etc. transferred to the Sicily side.

In 2003–04 season, he left for Cesena of Serie C1 on loan. In the next season, played for Martina.

=== Africa & Middle East ===
On 1 July 2005, he left for Espérance de Tunis and played at 2005 CAF Champions League.

In 2007, he left for Al Ain and played at 2007 AFC Champions League. In mid-2008, he left for Al Ahly Tripoli.

=== Ukraine ===
In March 2011 he signed for the Ukrainian side Zirka Kirovohrad.

== International career ==
Ongfiang was the captain of Cameroon U20 team at 2005 African Youth Championship qualification.

Ongfiang was a member of Cameroon U23 team. He was called up to a 42-men preliminary squad for 2004 CAF Men's Pre-Olympic Tournament against Ivory Coast U23 team in February 2004.

In November 2004, he was called up to the senior national team against Germany as reserve player. He also capped for Cameroon Youth team at 2007 All-Africa Games.
