= Daniele Di Donato =

Italian footballer and manager (born 1977)

Personal information
- Date of birth: 21 February 1977 (age 49)
- Place of birth: Giulianova, Italy
- Height: 1.73 m (5 ft 8 in)
- Position: Central midfielder

Team information
- Current team: Arzignano (head coach)

Youth career
- 1995–1996: Torino

Senior career*
Years	Team	Apps	(Gls)
1996–1997	Torino	8	(1)
1997	Castel di Sangro	0	(0)
1997–1998	Siena	20	(1)
1998–2000	Lodigiani	62	(1)
2000–2004	Palermo	133	(4)
2004–2005	Siena	23	(0)
2005–2007	Arezzo	77	(1)
2007–2013	Ascoli	207	(3)
2013–2014	Cittadella	3	(0)

Managerial career
- 2017–2018: Jesina
- 2018–2019: ArzignanoChiampo
- 2019–2020: Arezzo
- 2020: Trapani
- 2020–2021: Vis Pesaro
- 2021–2024: Latina
- 2024–2025: Team Altamura
- 2025–: Arzignano
- * Club domestic league appearances and goals

Daniele Di Donato (born 21 February 1977) is an Italian football manager and a former midfielder, currently in charge of Serie C Group A club Arzignano.

== Playing career ==
Di Donato, nicknamed Dido, started his professional career with Torino (then in Serie B). He is best known for having spent a total of four seasons with Palermo, being the protagonist of two promotions that led the Sicilians from Serie C1 to Serie A, and being a fan favourite during his stay with the rosanero with a total of 133 appearances. He also played a season in Serie A with Siena in 2005–2006. After two seasons with Arezzo of Serie B, in 2007, he signed a contract with Ascoli.

== Coaching career ==
After retirement, Di Donato joined Modena as a youth coach. He was subsequently appointed as the head coach of the Serie D club Jesina for the 2017–18 season.

He was then named the new head coach of ArzignanoChiampo, which he guided to promotion to Serie C on his first season in charge. He left the club at the end of the 2018–19 season to become manager of Arezzo. He left Arezzo at the end of the 2019–20 season.

On 30 August 2020, he was hired by Serie C club Trapani. Trapani never took the field in their scheduled games and was officially excluded from Serie C on 5 October 2020.

On 3 November 2020, he signed with Serie C club Vis Pesaro.

On 11 August 2021, he was presented as the new manager of the newly promoted Serie C club Latina. After two and a half years in charge of the first team, he was dismissed from his role on 14 January 2024.

In July 2024, Di Donato was hired by newly promoted Serie C club Team Altamura. Despite guiding Team Altamura to safety, he departed by the end of the season after having failed to find an agreement with the club regarding a contract extension.

On 4 November 2025, Di Donato returned to Arzignano as the club's new head coach in the Serie C league.
