= Ighli Vannucchi =

Italian footballer

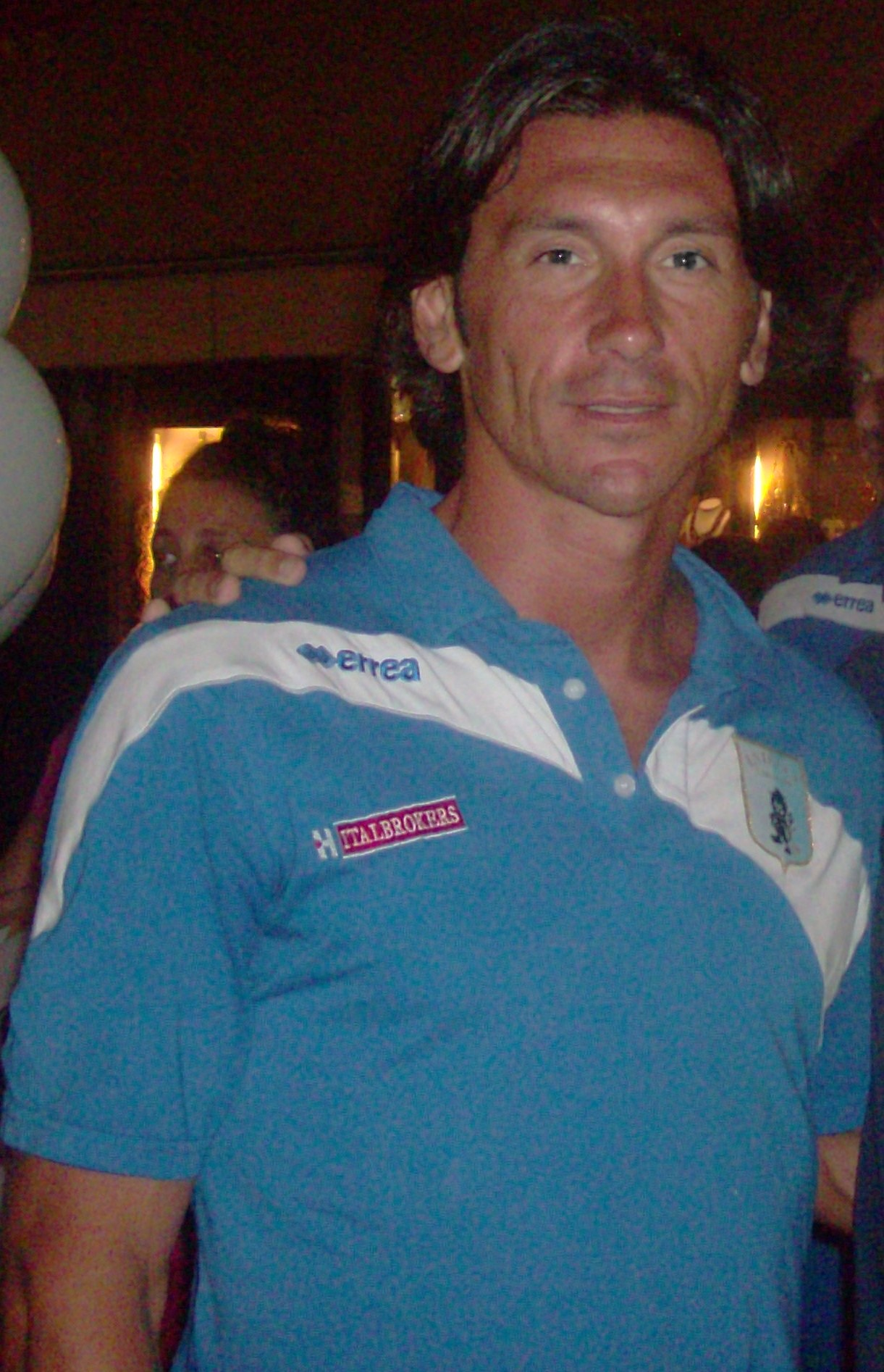
- Ighli Vannucchi in 2012.

Personal information
- Date of birth: 5 August 1977 (age 49)
- Place of birth: Prato, Italy
- Height: 1.80 m (5 ft 11 in)
- Position: Attacking midfielder

Youth career
- 1985–1991: Maliseti Seano
- 1991–1993: Margine Coperta
- 1993–1996: Lucchese

Senior career*
Years	Team	Apps	(Gls)
1996–1998	Lucchese	49	(3)
1998–2000	Salernitana	73	(13)
2001–2002	Venezia	33	(1)
2002–2004	Palermo	8	(0)
2002–2003	→ Empoli (loan)	29	(3)
2004–2010	Empoli	234	(32)
2010	Guamo	2	(0)
2010–2012	Spezia	39	(7)
2012–2013	Entella Chiavari	33	(4)
2013–2014	Viareggio	25	(5)

International career
1998–2000	Italy U-21	16	(2)
- * Club domestic league appearances and goals

Ighli Vannucchi (born 5 August 1977) is an Italian former footballer who played as a midfielder. A player with notable technical ability and vision, he played mainly for mid-table Serie A clubs, as well as in the Serie B.

== Club career ==
Vannucchi was born in Prato.

=== Empoli ===
He joined first Empoli in their 2002-2003 campaign, and returned to the Tuscan side in January 2004 after an unimpressive six-month stay at Palermo. He was the team captain and was considered one of the most representative players of the squad.

=== Spezia ===
Vannucchi was released on 1 July 2010 and in October signed by Spezia. On 27 June 2011, he signed a new one-year contract.

== International career ==
Vannucchi has represented Italy at U-21 level, winning the UEFA U-21 Championship in 2000, also representing the Italy U-23 side at the 2000 Summer Olympics.
