= Cristian La Grottería =

Argentine footballer

Personal information
- Full name: Cristian Alejandro La Grottería
- Date of birth: July 25, 1974 (age 52)
- Place of birth: La Plata, Argentina
- Height: 1.88 m (6 ft 2 in)
- Position: Second striker

Team information
- Current team: Cittadella (academy manager)

Youth career
- –1989: Gimnasia LP
- 1989–1995: Estudiantes

Senior career*
Years	Team	Apps	(Gls)
1995–1997	Estudiantes	21	(1)
1995	→ Estación Quequén (loan)	14	(11)
1997	San Martín (SJ)	8	(4)
1998	→ San Martín (M) (loan)	13	(2)
1998–2000	Ancona	33	(12)
2000–2003	Palermo	80	(17)
2003–2007	Padova	88	(22)
2007–2009	SPAL 1907	49	(13)
2009–2011	Bassano Virtus	52	(10)
Total		358	(92)

Managerial career
- 2011–2016: Bassano Virtus (technical director)
- 2012: Bassano Virtus (assistant)
- 2012–2016: Bassano Virtus (head of youth development)
- 2015–2016: Bassano Virtus (assistant)
- 2017: Catania (assistant)
- 2018: Bassano Virtus (academy coordinator)
- 2018–: Cittadella (academy manager)
- * Club domestic league appearances and goals

Cristian Alejandro La Grottería (born 25 July 1974) is a retired Argentine footballer. He also has Italian citizenship.

== Playing career ==
La Grottería began his career playing professionally at Estudiantes de La Plata. He also had short spells with Argentine lower division club Club Atlético San Martín (San Juan) and San Martín de Mendoza. His previous clubs in Italy include Padova, Palermo and Ancona. He retired in June 2011 after two seasons with Lega Pro Seconda Divisione club Bassano Virtus.

== Post-playing and coaching career ==
After retirement, La Grottería agreed to stay at Bassano Virtus in a non-playing role as a technical area coordinator. He then also served as assistant coach on a couple different stints before leaving the club in February 2017 to become Mario Petrone's assistant at Catania. He left the club just a few weeks later, on 8 March 2017, following Petrone's resignations.

Palermo

- Serie C: 2000-01
