= Valentino Lai =

Swedish footballer (born 1984)

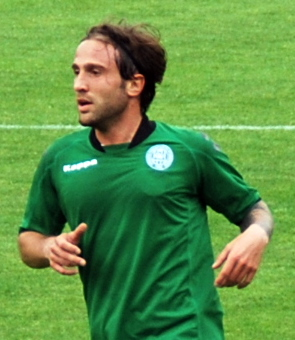

Personal information
- Date of birth: 3 February 1984 (age 42)
- Place of birth: Cagliari, Italy
- Height: 1.76 m (5 ft 9 in)
- Position: Midfielder

Youth career
- –2000: FBK Balkan
- 2000: Malmö FF
- 2000–2001: Venezia

Senior career*
Years	Team	Apps	(Gls)
2001–2002	Venezia	3	(0)
2002–2005	Palermo	1	(0)
2003–2004	→ Salernitana (loan)	31	(2)
2004–2005	→ Triestina (loan)	17	(0)
2005–2007	Landskrona BoIS	34	(3)
2007–2011	Vejle Boldklub	73	(9)
2010	→ Apollon Limassol (loan)	10	(1)
2011	Viborg FF	14	(0)
2012–2013	KSF Prespa Birlik	29	(2)
2014–2017	FC Rosengård		

International career^{‡}
2004	Sweden U21	6	(0)
- * Club domestic league appearances and goals as of 11:50, 27 June 2012 (UTC) ‡ National team caps and goals as of 19 August 2011

Valentino Lai (born 3 February 1984) is a former footballer who played as a midfielder. Born in Italy, Lai represented Sweden internationally.

== Club career ==
Born in Cagliari, Italy, Lai started his career playing for Swedish club FBK Balkan at youth level, and subsequently Malmö FF. In 2001, he moved back to Italy playing for Venezia, where he made his Serie A debut. In 2002, he moved to Palermo, appearing just in one Serie B match. After two loan spells at the Serie B level, in Salernitana and Triestina, in June 2005 Lai decided to return in Sweden by signing a 2-years contract for Landskrona BoIS, playing in Superettan. Then he went to the Danish club Vejle Boldklub. In the winter of 2010, Valentino went to Apollon Limassol on a loan deal. After leaving Apollon Limassol in summer of 2010, Lai went back to Vejle BK.

== International career ==
At international level, Lai also represented Sweden at U21 level.
