= Adriano Zancopè =

Italian footballer and manager (born 1971)

Personal information
- Date of birth: 19 November 1971 (age 54)
- Place of birth: Padova, Italy
- Height: 1.92 m (6 ft 3 1/2 in)
- Position: Goalkeeper

Team information
- Current team: Padova

Youth career
- Padova

Senior career*
| Years | Team | Apps | (Gls) |
| 1989–1990 | Padova | 1 | (0) |
| 1990–1991 | Trento | 8 | (0) |
| 1991–1992 | Baracca Lugo | 8 | (0) |
| 1992–1993 | Vigor Lamezia | 27 | (0) |
| 1993–1994 | Giorgione | 18 | (0) |
| 1994–2000 | Cittadella | 184 | (0) |
| 2000 | Viterbese | 15 | (0) |
| 2000–2001 | Catania | 13 | (0) |
| 2001–2004 | Modena | 20 | (0) |
| 2004–2005 | Siena | 0 | (0) |
| 2005–2006 | Treviso | 29 | (0) |
| 2006–2008 | Vicenza | 56 | (0) |
| Total | | 379 | (0) |

International career
| 1989 | Italy U18 | 12 | (0) |
| 1990 | Italy U21 | 1 | (0) |

Managerial career
- 2014–: Padova (goalkeepers)
- * Club domestic league appearances and goals

Adriano Zancopè (born 19 November 1971) is an Italian football manager and former footballer. He spent most of his career in Serie C2 (179 matches) and Serie C1 (94 matches). He also briefly played in Serie A (46 matches) and Serie B (60 matches). He spent 6 seasons at Cittadella, and also played as a backup goalkeeper for by-then Serie A teams Modena, Siena and Treviso.

== Club career ==
=== Early career ===
Zancopè started his professional career at hometown club Padova. He played 8 matches at Serie B with first team in 1989–90 season, while also played at Primavera Team. From 1990 to 1994 seasons, he left for Serie C1 and Serie C2 clubs, where he became the regular at Vigor Lamezia and Giorgione.

=== Cittadella ===
In 1994, he was signed by Cittadella permanently. He was the regular starter and won 1997–98 Serie C2 runner-up and promoted to Serie C1. He continued to play as the first choice, ahead Luca Capecchi. In 1999–2000 season, he was signed by Viterbese. He played the remain half season as starter, helped the club enter the promotion playoffs but lost in semi-finals (while his former clubs won the playoffs in another group).

=== Catania ===
In 2000, he was signed by Catania of Serie C1. He played as backup goalkeeper of Gennaro Iezzo but also played 13 matches.

=== Modena ===
In 2001, he was signed by Modena of Serie B in co-ownership deal. He played as Marco Ballotta's backup. In 2003–04 season, he played his first Serie A match on 5 October 2003, a 3–0 win against Empoli F.C. In that match he replaced Riccardo Allegretti in the 15th minute, after Ballotta was sent off. In that season he also played 17 starts along with Ballotta. But the team failed to score regularly and ranked 3rd in the least in both points and scored. He left the club at the end of season as Modena relegated.

=== Siena & Treviso ===
In 2004, at aged 32, he was signed by Siena of Serie A. He played as backup of Austrian internationals Alex Manninger and Marco Fortin.

In the next season, he was signed by newly promoted Serie A team Treviso, exchanged with Davide Zomer (which promoted due to Caso Genoa), replaced Marco Ballotta who left for Lazio. He played regularly and backup by Slovenian internationals Samir Handanovič and later Matteo Sereni. But the team also failed to score regularly and ranked bottom in both points (later ahead Juventus due to 2006 Italian football scandal) and goal scored.

=== Vicenza ===
In August 2006, he was offered a 1-year contract at Vicenza of Serie B. He replaced the Vicenza legend Giorgio Sterchele as the first choice, which only about 2-year old than him, ahead Matteo Guardalben. In the next season his contract was extended, and from Round 2 to Round 15 he was the first choice, but the team ranked 5th from the bottom. He then played as backup of Guardalben and replaced him on the 43rd minute against Frosinone on 15 December 2007. He played the next match as starter on 22 December 2007 which 1–3 lost to Chievo but handed back to Guardalben in next match. On 29 January 2008, Vicenza signed former teammate Marco Fortin and both Guardalben and Zancopè became backup, and eventually survived from relegation.

== International career ==
Zancopè played for the Italy U-18 side during 1990 UEFA European Under-18 Football Championship qualification. He also played once for Italy U21 on 19 December 1990, against Cyprus U21.

== Coaching career ==
In June 2008 he returned to Calcio Padova and joined the coaching team.

In the summer of 2014 became goalkeeping coach of Biancoscudati Padova, the phoenix club of the original club.
