= 2004–05 Genoa CFC season =

Genoa
2004–05 season
- Chairman: Enrico Preziosi
- Head coach: Serse Cosmi
- Stadium: Stadio Luigi Ferraris
- Serie B: 22nd (demoted)
- Coppa Italia: Group stage
- Top goalscorer: League: Diego Milito (21); All: Diego Milito (21)
- Biggest win: Genoa 5–0 Salernitana
- Biggest defeat: Salernitana 4–0 Genoa

The 2004–05 Genoa CFC season was the club's 112th season in existence and the club's 10th consecutive season in the top flight of Italian football. In addition to the domestic league, Genoa participated in the 2004–05 Coppa Italia. Genoa was put in the last place by the FIGC as punishment because of match fixing in the Caso Genoa.

== Pre-season and friendlies ==
Win Draw Loss Fixtures

24 July 2004 Friendly	Genoa (Italy)	1–2	(Italy) Torino	Biella
20:30 CEST (UTC+2)	Makinwa 42'		Emiliano 60'; Franco 67'	Stadium: Stadio Lamarmora; Attendance: 3,000; Referee: Di Fiore

== Competitions ==
=== Overview ===
Competition	First match	Last match	Starting round	Final position	Record							
Competition	First match	Last match	Starting round	Final position	Pld	W	D	L	GF	GA	GD	Win %
Serie B	13 September 2004	11 June 2005	Matchday 1	22nd	42	19	19	4	72	44	+28	45.24
Coppa Italia	14 August 2004	29 August 2004	Group stage	Group stage	3	1	1	1	7	6	+1	33.33
Total					45	20	20	5	79	50	+29	44.44

Source: Competitions

=== Serie B ===
==== League table ====
Pos	Team	Pld	W	D	L	GF	GA	GD	Pts	Promotion or relegation
18	Triestina (T)	42	12	12	18	43	54	−11	48	Qualification for Relegation play-offs
19	Pescara (Note: Spared from relegation following Salernitana's and Perugia's bankruptcy.) (T)	42	10	16	16	43	61	−18	46	Spared from relegation
20	Venezia (Note: Dissolved due to bankruptcy. A new entity was admitted to Serie C2 by Lodo Petrucci. The team was also involved in Caso Genoa.) (R, E, D)	42	7	14	21	33	58	−25	35	Relegation to Serie C2
21	Catanzaro (T)	42	5	11	26	40	82	−42	26	Spared from relegation
22	Genoa (Note: Put in the last place by the FIGC because of match fixing in the Caso Genoa.) (D, R)	42	19	19	4	72	44	+28	76	Relegation to Serie C1

Source: Almanacco Illustrato del Calcio 2006, Panini Edizioni, Modena, November 2005
Rules for classification: 1) points; 2) head-to-head points; 3) head-to-head goal difference; 4) head-to-head goals scored; 5) goal difference; 6) number of goals scored.
(D) Disqualified; (E) Eliminated; (R) Relegated; (T) Qualified, but not yet for the particular phase indicated

==== Results summary ====
Overall								Home						Away					
Pld	W	D	L	GF	GA	GD	Pts	W	D	L	GF	GA	GD	W	D	L	GF	GA	GD
42	19	19	4	72	44	+28	76	13	7	1	43	20	+23	6	12	3	29	24	+5

==== Results by round ====
Round	1	2	3	4	5	6	7	8	9	10	11	12	13	14	15	16	17	18	19	20	21	22	23	24	25	26	27	28	29	30	31	32	33	34	35	36	37	38	39	40	41	42
Ground	A	H	A	H	A	H	A	H	A	H	A	H	A	H	A	H	A	H	A	H	A	H	A	H	A	H	A	H	A	H	A	H	A	H	A	H	A	H	A	H	A	H
Result	D	W	L	W	D	W	W	W	D	D	W	D	W	W	W	W	D	W	D	W	W	D	D	D	L	L	D	W	L	W	D	W	D	D	W	D	D	D	D	W	D	W
Position	10	7	10	6	7	5	3	2	2	3	2	2	2	2	2	1	1	1	1	1	1	1	1	1	1	1	1	1	1	1	1	1	1	1	1	1	1	2	2	2	2	22

A = Away; H = Home; W = Win; D = Draw; L = Loss

==== Matches ====
13 September 2004 1	Modena	1–1	Genoa	Modena
CEST (UTC+2)

18 September 2004 2	Genoa	2–0	Pescara	Genoa
CEST (UTC+2)				Stadium: Stadio Luigi Ferraris

21 September 2004 3	Torino	2–1	Genoa	Turin
CEST (UTC+2)

25 September 2004 4	Genoa	5–0	Salernitana	Genoa
CEST (UTC+2)				Stadium: Stadio Luigi Ferraris

1 October 2004 5	Perugia	2–2	Genoa	Perugia
CEST (UTC+2)

6 October 2004 6	Genoa	5–2	Vicenza	Genoa
CEST (UTC+2)				Stadium: Stadio Luigi Ferraris

10 October 2004 7	Bari	0–1	Genoa	Bari
CEST (UTC+2)

18 October 2004 8	Genoa	2–1	Treviso	Genoa
CEST (UTC+2)				Stadium: Stadio Luigi Ferraris

23 October 2004 9	Arezzo	2–2	Genoa	Arezzo
CEST (UTC+2)

26 October 2004 10	Genoa	1–1	Hellas Verona	Genoa
CEST (UTC+2)				Stadium: Stadio Luigi Ferraris

30 October 2004 11	AlbinoLeffe	0–3	Genoa	Bergamo
CEST (UTC+2)

7 November 2004 12	Genoa	2–2	Triestina	Genoa
CET (UTC+1)				Stadium: Stadio Luigi Ferraris

13 November 2004 13	Catania	1–3	Genoa	Catania
CET (UTC+1)

21 November 2004 14	Genoa	3–0	Ascoli	Genoa
CET (UTC+1)				Stadium: Stadio Luigi Ferraris

28 November 2004 15	Ternana	0–1	Genoa	Terni
CET (UTC+1)

5 December 2004 16	Genoa	1–0	Crotone	Genoa
CET (UTC+1)				Stadium: Stadio Luigi Ferraris

10 December 2004 17	Cesena	1–1	Genoa	Cesena
CET (UTC+1)

19 December 2004 18	Genoa	3–2	Empoli	Genoa
CET (UTC+1)				Stadium: Stadio Luigi Ferraris

6 January 2005 19	Catanzaro	1–1	Genoa	Catanzaro
CET (UTC+1)

9 January 2005 20	Genoa	1–0	Piacenza	Genoa
CET (UTC+1)				Stadium: Stadio Luigi Ferraris

16 January 2005 21	Venezia	0–3	Genoa	Venice
CET (UTC+1)

21 January 2005 22	Genoa	0–0	Modena	Genoa
CET (UTC+1)				Stadium: Stadio Luigi Ferraris

30 January 2005 23	Pescara	2–2	Genoa	Pescara
CET (UTC+1)

3 February 2005 24	Genoa	0–0	Torino	Genoa
CET (UTC+1)				Stadium: Stadio Luigi Ferraris

6 February 2005 25	Salernitana	4–0	Genoa	Salerno
CET (UTC+1)

13 February 2005 26	Genoa	0–1	Perugia	Genoa
CET (UTC+1)				Stadium: Stadio Luigi Ferraris

20 February 2005 27	Vicenza	2–2	Genoa	Vicenza
CET (UTC+1)

27 February 2005 28	Genoa	2–1	Bari	Genoa
CET (UTC+1)				Stadium: Stadio Luigi Ferraris

7 March 2005 29	Treviso	3–0	Genoa	Treviso
CET (UTC+1)

13 March 2005 30	Genoa	3–1	Arezzo	Genoa
CET (UTC+1)				Stadium: Stadio Luigi Ferraris

26 March 2005 31	Hellas Verona	1–1	Genoa	Verona
CET (UTC+1)

9 April 2005 32	Genoa	3–2	AlbinoLeffe	Genoa
CEST (UTC+2)				Stadium: Stadio Luigi Ferraris

16 April 2005 33	Triestina	0–0	Genoa	Trieste
CEST (UTC+2)

20 April 2005 34	Genoa	0–0	Catania	Genoa
CEST (UTC+2)				Stadium: Stadio Luigi Ferraris

25 April 2005 35	Ascoli	0–3	Genoa	Ascoli
CEST (UTC+2)

30 April 2005 36	Genoa	1–1	Ternana	Genoa
CEST (UTC+2)				Stadium: Stadio Luigi Ferraris

7 May 2005 37	Crotone	0–0	Genoa	Crotone
CEST (UTC+2)

14 May 2005 38	Genoa	3–3	Cesena	Genoa
CEST (UTC+2)				Stadium: Stadio Luigi Ferraris

21 May 2005 39	Empoli	0–0	Genoa	Empoli
CEST (UTC+2)

28 May 2005 40	Genoa	3–1	Catanzaro	Genoa
CEST (UTC+2)				Stadium: Stadio Luigi Ferraris

5 June 2005 41	Piacenza	2–2	Genoa	Piacenza
CEST (UTC+2)

11 June 2005 42	Genoa	3–2	Venezia	Genoa
CEST (UTC+2)				Stadium: Stadio Luigi Ferraris

=== Coppa Italia ===
==== Group stage ====
14 August 2004 1	Empoli	0–2	Genoa	Empoli
20:30 CEST (UTC+2)				Stadium: /Stadio Carlo Castellani; Referee: Paolo Tagliavento

22 August 2004 2	Genoa	2–3	Lumezzane	Genoa
20:45 CEST (UTC+2)				Stadium: Stadio Luigi Ferraris; Attendance: 9,857; Referee: Andrea Romeo

29 August 2004 3	Genoa	3–3	Torino	Genoa
20:30 CEST (UTC+2)				Stadium: Stadio Luigi Ferraris; Attendance: 13,040; Referee: Pierluigi Collina

== Statistics ==
=== Goalscorers ===
Rank	Pos	No.	Nat	Name	Serie B	Coppa Italia	Total
1	FW		(Argentina)	Diego Milito	21	0	21
2	FW		(Italy)	Roberto Stellone	18	0	18
3	MF		(Italy)	Giovanni Tedesco	7	0	7
4	FW		(Nigeria)	Stephen Makinwa	6	0	6
Own goals					0	0	0
Totals					72	0	72
