= Davide Zomer =

Italian footballer (born 1977)

Personal information
- Date of birth: 21 October 1977 (age 49)
- Place of birth: Rovereto, Italy
- Height: 1.91 m (6 ft 3 in)
- Position: Goalkeeper

Youth career
- Verona

Senior career*
Years	Team	Apps	(Gls)
1997–2004	Verona	16	(0)
1998–1999	→ Trento (loan)	26	(0)
1999–2000	→ Siena (loan)	2	(0)
2000–2001	→ Südtirol (loan)	13	(0)
2004–2005	Treviso	5	(0)
2005–2006	Siena	0	(0)
2007–2008	Ancona	10	(0)
2008	Lumezzane	11	(0)
2009	Ascoli	3	(0)
2009–2011	Südtirol	68	(0)
2011–2012	FeralpiSalò	7	(0)
2013–2015	Mezzocorona	31	(0)
2015–2016	Levico Terme	7	(0)
- * Club domestic league appearances and goals

Davide Zomer (born 21 October 1977) is an Italian former footballer.

== Biography ==
Born in Rovereto, Trentino-Alto Adige/Südtirol region (Trentino – South Tyrol in English and Trentino – Alto Adige in Italian), Zomer started his career at Veneto club Hellas Verona.

Zomer returned to Trentino for Trento, then moved to Tuscany side Siena. In 2000–01 season, he left for South Tyrolean club Südtirol. He then returned to Verona as backup keeper and competed with Jess Vanstrattan.

In 2004–05 season, he left for Serie B side Treviso. After the team promoted due to Caso Genoa, he was exchanged with Adriano Zancopè of Siena. He worked as the backup of young keeper Antonio Mirante and competed with Marco Fortin. In May 2006, he had a surgery.

In March 2007, he left for Serie C1 side Ancona. At the start of 2007–08 season, he was offered a new annual contract. In January 2008, he swapped club with Luca Brignoli, to Serie C2 side Lumezzane. (which Ancona eventually promoted back to Serie B).

In March 2009, he was signed by Serie B side Ascoli. On 2 July 2009, Zomer returned to South Tyrol for the second time, winning group a of 2009–10 Lega Pro Seconda Divisione. On 31 March 2010, his contract was extended to 30 June 2012.

On 20 July 2011 he was sold to FeralpiSalò.
