= 2004–05 UC AlbinoLeffe season =

U.C. AlbinoLeffe
2004–05 season
- Chairman: Gianfranco Andreoletti
- Head coach: Elio Gustinetti
- Stadium: Stadio Atleti Azzurri d'Italia
- Serie B: 11th
- Coppa Italia: Group stage
- Top goalscorer: League: Christian Araboni (8); All: Christian Araboni (8)

The 2004–05 season was the seventh season in the existence of U.C. AlbinoLeffe and the club's second consecutive season in the second division of Italian football. In addition to the domestic league, AlbinoLeffe participated in this season's edition of the Coppa Italia.

== Transfers ==
=== In ===
| No. | Pos | Player | Transferred from | Fee | Date | Source |
|---|---|---|---|---|---|---|
| | DF | (Italy) Valerio Di Cesare | (England) Chelsea | | | |
| | FW | (France) Julien Rantier | (Italy) Vicenza | | | |

=== Out ===
| No. | Pos | Player | Transferred to | Fee | Date | Source |
|---|---|---|---|---|---|---|
| | FW | (Italy) Davide Possanzini | (Italy) Palermo | | | |
| | MF | (Italy) Giovanni Serrapica | (Italy) Sassuolo | | | |
| | MF | (Italy) Alberto Colombo | (Italy) Como | | | |
| | GK | (Italy) Matteo Gritti | (Italy) Pro Palazzolo | | | |

== Pre-season and friendlies ==
Win Draw Loss

== Competitions ==
=== Overall record ===
| Competition | First match | Last match | Starting round | Final position | Record | | | | | | | |
| Competition | First match | Last match | Starting round | Final position | Pld | W | D | L | GF | GA | GD | Win % |
|---|---|---|---|---|---|---|---|---|---|---|---|---|
| Serie B | 11 September 2004 | 11 June 2005 | Matchday 1 | 11th | 42 | 14 | 13 | 15 | 55 | 51 | +4 | 33.33 |
| Coppa Italia | 14 August 2004 | 29 August 2004 | Group stage | Group stage | 3 | 2 | 0 | 1 | 3 | 3 | +0 | 66.67 |
| Total | | | | | 45 | 16 | 13 | 16 | 58 | 54 | +4 | 35.56 |

Source: Competitions

=== Serie B ===
==== League table ====
| Pos | Team | Pld | W | D | L | GF | GA | GD | Pts | Promotion or relegation |
|---|---|---|---|---|---|---|---|---|---|---|
| 9 | Piacenza | 42 | 16 | 8 | 18 | 44 | 46 | −2 | 56 | |
| 10 | Bari (Note: 1 point deducted.) | 42 | 13 | 17 | 12 | 41 | 37 | +4 | 55 | |
| 11 | AlbinoLeffe | 42 | 14 | 13 | 15 | 55 | 51 | +4 | 55 | |
| 12 | Catania | 42 | 13 | 16 | 13 | 42 | 44 | −2 | 55 | |
| 13 | Salernitana (Note: Relegated to Serie C1 for financial problems.) (E, R) | 42 | 12 | 15 | 15 | 50 | 57 | −7 | 51 | Relegation to Serie C1 |

Source: Almanacco Illustrato del Calcio 2006, Panini Edizioni, Modena, November 2005
Rules for classification: 1) points; 2) head-to-head points; 3) head-to-head goal difference; 4) head-to-head goals scored; 5) goal difference; 6) number of goals scored.
(E) Eliminated; (R) Relegated

==== Results summary ====
| Overall | | | | | | | | Home | | | | | | Away | | | | | |
| Pld | W | D | L | GF | GA | GD | Pts | W | D | L | GF | GA | GD | W | D | L | GF | GA | GD |
|---|---|---|---|---|---|---|---|---|---|---|---|---|---|---|---|---|---|---|---|
| 0 | 0 | 0 | 0 | 0 | 0 | 0 | 0 | 0 | 0 | 0 | 0 | 0 | 0 | 0 | 0 | 0 | 0 | 0 | 0 |

Source: Serie B

==== Results by round ====
| Round | 1 | 2 | 3 | 4 | 5 | 6 | 7 | 8 | 9 | 10 | 11 | 12 | 13 | 14 | 15 | 16 | 17 | 18 | 19 | 20 | 21 | 22 | 23 | 24 | 25 | 26 | 27 | 28 | 29 | 30 | 31 | 32 | 33 | 34 | 35 | 36 | 37 | 38 | 39 | 40 | 41 | 42 |
|---|---|---|---|---|---|---|---|---|---|---|---|---|---|---|---|---|---|---|---|---|---|---|---|---|---|---|---|---|---|---|---|---|---|---|---|---|---|---|---|---|---|---|
| Ground | A | H | A | H | A | H | A | H | A | H | H | A | A | H | A | H | A | H | A | H | A | H | A | H | A | H | A | H | A | H | A | A | H | H | A | H | A | H | A | H | A | H |
| Result | W | W | W | W | D | D | L | L | W | D | L | L | D | D | D | L | L | W | L | W | L | W | D | W | L | L | W | D | W | D | L | L | D | W | L | W | D | W | D | D | L | L |
| Position | 3 | 3 | 2 | 1 | 2 | 3 | 4 | 5 | 3 | 4 | 7 | 9 | 8 | 8 | 8 | 11 | 14 | 10 | 12 | 9 | 9 | 9 | 10 | 9 | 10 | 12 | 10 | 10 | 9 | 9 | 10 | 11 | 12 | 10 | 12 | 10 | 12 | 10 | 10 | 9 | 10 | 11 |

Source: Serie B
A = Away; H = Home; W = Win; D = Draw; L = Loss

==== Matches ====
| 11 September 2004 1 | Venezia | 0–2 | AlbinoLeffe |
| --:-- CEST (UTC+2) |

| 18 September 2004 2 | AlbinoLeffe | 2–0 | Modena | Bergamo |
| --:-- CEST (UTC+2) | | | | Stadium: Stadio Atleti Azzurri d'Italia |

| 21 September 2004 3 | Pescara | 1–3 | AlbinoLeffe |
| --:-- CEST (UTC+2) |

| 25 September 2004 4 | AlbinoLeffe | 2–1 | Vicenza | Bergamo |
| --:-- CEST (UTC+2) | | | | Stadium: Stadio Atleti Azzurri d'Italia |

| 2 October 2004 5 | Bari | 1–1 | AlbinoLeffe |
| --:-- CEST (UTC+2) |

| 6 October 2004 6 | AlbinoLeffe | 1–1 | Catanzaro | Bergamo |
| --:-- CEST (UTC+2) | | | | Stadium: Stadio Atleti Azzurri d'Italia |

| 11 October 2004 7 | Empoli | 1–0 | AlbinoLeffe |
| --:-- CEST (UTC+2) |

| 16 October 2004 8 | AlbinoLeffe | 1–2 | Ascoli | Bergamo |
| --:-- CEST (UTC+2) | | | | Stadium: Stadio Atleti Azzurri d'Italia |

| 23 October 2004 9 | Treviso | 0–2 | AlbinoLeffe |
| --:-- CEST (UTC+2) |

| 30 October 2004 11 | AlbinoLeffe | 0–3 | Genoa | Bergamo |
| --:-- CEST (UTC+2) | | | | Stadium: Stadio Atleti Azzurri d'Italia |

| 3 November 2004 10 | AlbinoLeffe | 3–3 | Triestina | Bergamo |
| --:-- CET (UTC+1) | | | | Stadium: Stadio Atleti Azzurri d'Italia |

| 7 November 2004 12 | Hellas Verona | 3–2 | AlbinoLeffe |
| --:-- CET (UTC+1) |

| 14 November 2004 13 | Arezzo | 1–1 | AlbinoLeffe |
| --:-- CET (UTC+1) |

| 21 November 2004 14 | AlbinoLeffe | 1–1 | Crotone | Bergamo |
| --:-- CET (UTC+1) | | | | Stadium: Stadio Atleti Azzurri d'Italia |

| 28 November 2004 15 | Catania | 0–0 | AlbinoLeffe |
| --:-- CET (UTC+1) |

| 5 December 2004 16 | AlbinoLeffe | 1–2 | Salernitana | Bergamo |
| --:-- CET (UTC+1) | | | | Stadium: Stadio Atleti Azzurri d'Italia |

| 12 December 2004 17 | Ternana | 1–0 | AlbinoLeffe |
| --:-- CET (UTC+1) |

| 19 December 2004 18 | AlbinoLeffe | 3–0 | Piacenza | Bergamo |
| --:-- CET (UTC+1) | | | | Stadium: Stadio Atleti Azzurri d'Italia |

| 6 January 2005 19 | Cesena | 2–1 | AlbinoLeffe |
| --:-- CET (UTC+1) |

| 9 January 2005 20 | AlbinoLeffe | 2–1 | Torino | Bergamo |
| --:-- CET (UTC+1) | | | | Stadium: Stadio Atleti Azzurri d'Italia |

| 16 January 2005 21 | Perugia | 1–0 | AlbinoLeffe |
| --:-- CET (UTC+1) |

| 23 January 2005 22 | AlbinoLeffe | 1–0 | Venezia | Bergamo |
| --:-- CET (UTC+1) | | | | Stadium: Stadio Atleti Azzurri d'Italia |

| 30 January 2005 23 | Modena | 2–2 | AlbinoLeffe |
| --:-- CET (UTC+1) |

| 3 February 2005 24 | AlbinoLeffe | 4–0 | Pescara | Bergamo |
| --:-- CET (UTC+1) | | | | Stadium: Stadio Atleti Azzurri d'Italia |

| 6 February 2005 25 | Vicenza | 4–1 | AlbinoLeffe |
| --:-- CET (UTC+1) |

| 13 February 2005 26 | AlbinoLeffe | 0–1 | Bari | Bergamo |
| --:-- CET (UTC+1) | | | | Stadium: Stadio Atleti Azzurri d'Italia |

| 20 February 2005 27 | Catanzaro | 0–1 | AlbinoLeffe |
| --:-- CET (UTC+1) |

| 28 February 2005 28 | AlbinoLeffe | 0–0 | Empoli | Bergamo |
| --:-- CET (UTC+1) | | | | Stadium: Stadio Atleti Azzurri d'Italia |

| 6 March 2005 29 | Ascoli | 2–3 | AlbinoLeffe |
| --:-- CET (UTC+1) |

| 17 March 2005 30 | AlbinoLeffe | 2–2 | Treviso | Bergamo |
| --:-- CET (UTC+1) | | | | Stadium: Stadio Atleti Azzurri d'Italia |

| 26 March 2005 31 | Triestina | 2–1 | AlbinoLeffe |
| --:-- CET (UTC+1) |

| 9 April 2005 32 | Genoa | 3–2 | AlbinoLeffe |
| --:-- CEST (UTC+2) |

| 16 April 2005 33 | AlbinoLeffe | 1–1 | Hellas Verona | Bergamo |
| --:-- CEST (UTC+2) | | | | Stadium: Stadio Atleti Azzurri d'Italia |

| 20 April 2005 34 | AlbinoLeffe | 1–0 | Arezzo | Bergamo |
| --:-- CEST (UTC+2) | | | | Stadium: Stadio Atleti Azzurri d'Italia |

| 23 April 2005 35 | Crotone | 1–0 | AlbinoLeffe |
| --:-- CEST (UTC+2) |

| 30 April 2005 36 | AlbinoLeffe | 1–0 | Catania | Bergamo |
| --:-- CEST (UTC+2) | | | | Stadium: Stadio Atleti Azzurri d'Italia |

| 9 May 2005 37 | Salernitana | 1–1 | AlbinoLeffe |
| --:-- CEST (UTC+2) |

| 14 May 2005 38 | AlbinoLeffe | 3–1 | Ternana | Bergamo |
| --:-- CEST (UTC+2) | | | | Stadium: Stadio Atleti Azzurri d'Italia |

| 21 May 2005 39 | Piacenza | 1–1 | AlbinoLeffe |
| --:-- CEST (UTC+2) |

| 28 May 2005 40 | AlbinoLeffe | 1–1 | Cesena | Bergamo |
| --:-- CEST (UTC+2) | | | | Stadium: Stadio Atleti Azzurri d'Italia |

| 5 June 2005 41 | Torino | 3–1 | AlbinoLeffe |
| --:-- CEST (UTC+2) |

| 11 June 2005 42 | AlbinoLeffe | 0–1 | Perugia | Bergamo |
| --:-- CEST (UTC+2) | | | | Stadium: Stadio Atleti Azzurri d'Italia |

=== Coppa Italia ===
Group B

| 14 August 2004 1 | AlbinoLeffe | 2–0 | Pro Patria | Bergamo |
| | | | | Stadium: Stadio Atleti Azzurri d'Italia |

| 22 August 2004 2 | Atalanta | 3–0 | AlbinoLeffe | Bergamo |
| | | | | Stadium: Stadio Atleti Azzurri d'Italia |

| 29 August 2004 3 | Vicenza | 0–1 | AlbinoLeffe | Vicenza |
| | | | | Stadium: Stadio Romeo Menti |
