= 1997–98 AC Perugia season =

AC Perugia season

Perugia
1997–98 season
- Chairman: Luciano Gaucci
- Manager: Attilio Perotti (1st–8th); Alberto Bigon (9th–16th); Attilio Perotti (17th–27th); Ilario Castagner (28th–38th + tie-breaker)
- Serie B: 4th (promoted)
- Coppa Italia: Round of 32
- Top goalscorer: League: Bernardini (11); Tovalieri (11); All: Bernardini (11); Tovalieri (11)
Home colours	Away colours	Third colours

During the 1997–98 season, Perugia competed in Serie B, securing a historic promotion back to Serie A after winning a tense promotion tie-breaker match against Torino.

== Season review ==
Following relegation from the top flight the previous year, Perugia entered the 1997–98 Serie B campaign with the clear objective of an immediate return to Serie A. The club started the season under head coach Attilio Perotti. However, an inconsistent run of form led to a turbulent campaign characterized by multiple managerial changes: spells under Alberto Bigon and a brief return for Perotti preceded the decisive appointment of veteran coach Ilario Castagner in March 1998.

A strong, determined run in the final stretch of the season—bolstered by key winter additions such as striker Sandro Tovalieri, goalkeeper Angelo Pagotto, and midfielder Renato Olive—allowed the Grifoni to climb the table and finish in fourth place. Level on points with Torino at the end of the 38-game regular season, Perugia achieved promotion by prevailing 5–4 on penalties following a 1–1 draw in the neutral-venue promotion tie-breaker held in Reggio Emilia on 21 June 1998.

== Squad ==
=== Goalkeepers ===
- ITA Angelo Pagotto
- ARG Juan Carlos Docabo
- ITA Crescenzo De Vito
- FRY Aleksandar Kocić
- ITA Marco Storari

=== Defenders ===
- ITA Gianluca Colonnello
- ITA Marco Materazzi
- ITA Salvatore Matrecano
- ITA Massimiliano Tangorra
- YUG Bratislav Mijalković
- ITA Martino Traversa
- ITA Gabriele Grossi
- ITA Paolo Guastalvino
- ITA Andrea Cottini
- ITA Patrick Panucci
- ITA Gianluca Esposito

=== Midfielders ===
- ITA Antonino Bernardini
- ITA Renato Olive
- ITA Alessandro Cucciari
- ITA Antonio Manicone
- SUI Massimo Lombardo
- ITA Pasquale Domenico Rocco
- ITA Daniele Russo
- ITA Pier Giovanni Rutzittu
- ITA Luca Bordichini
- ITA Giovanni Renna
- BEL Bruno Versavel
- BEL Marc Emmers
- ITA Renzo Tasso

=== Attackers ===
- ITA Sandro Tovalieri
- CRO Milan Rapaić
- ITA Stefano Guidoni
- ITA Alessandro Melli
- ARG Fernando Pandolfi
- DEN Thomas Thorninger
- ITA Emiliano Testini

== Competitions ==
=== Serie B ===
==== League table ====
Pos	Team	Pld	W	D	L	GF	GA	GD	Pts	Promotion or relegation
1	Salernitana	38	19	15	4	65	32	+33	72	Promotion to Serie A
2	Venezia	38	17	13	8	51	31	+20	64	Promotion to Serie A
3	Cagliari	38	15	18	5	53	36	+17	63	Promotion to Serie A
4	Perugia (P)	38	15	17	6	52	35	+17	62	Promotion to Serie A
5	Torino	38	17	11	10	50	40	+10	62	

(P) Promoted

==== Promotion tie-breaker ====
The 1997–98 Serie B regular season ended with Perugia and Torino locked on 62 points in the battle for the fourth and final promotion spot to Serie A. To settle the tie, a one-off play-off match was scheduled on neutral ground at the Stadio Giglio in Reggio Emilia.

The match proved to be a dramatic, high-tension affair played in front of nearly 20,000 spectators. After a tightly contested scoreless first half, Perugia broke the deadlock in the 76th minute when veteran striker Sandro Tovalieri found the back of the net. Torino reacted immediately, equalizing just three minutes later through their star forward Marco Ferrante in the 79th minute. With the score tied 1–1 after regulation time, the match went into extra time. Neither side managed to score during the additional thirty minutes, pushing the decision to a penalty shoot-out.

In the dramatic spot-kick sequence, Perugia's execution was flawless: Bernardini, Rapaić, Materazzi, Colonnello, and Tovalieri all successfully converted their penalties. For Torino, while Ferrante, Lentini, Cravero, and Carparelli scored, former England international defender Tony Dorigo missed his spot-kick, hitting the post. Winning the shoot-out 5–4, Perugia secured their triumphant return to the top flight.

21 June 1998
17:00 CEST

Perugia	1–1 (a.e.t.)	Torino
Tovalieri 76'		Ferrante 79'
Penalties
Bernardini (penalty scored); Rapaić (penalty scored); Materazzi (penalty scored); Colonnello (penalty scored); Tovalieri (penalty scored)	5–4	(penalty scored) Ferrante; (penalty scored) Lentini; (penalty scored) Cravero; (penalty missed) Dorigo; (penalty scored) Carparelli

Stadio Giglio, Reggio Emilia
Attendance: 19,614
Referee: Graziano Cesari

A.C. Perugia promoted to 1998–99 Serie A.

==== Topscorers ====
- Antonino Bernardini 11
- Sandro Tovalieri 11
- Stefano Guidoni 7
- Marco Materazzi 5
- Milan Rapaić 5
