= Gianluca Zanetti =

Italian footballer

Personal information
- Full name: Gianluca Zanetti
- Date of birth: 2 July 1977 (age 49)
- Place of birth: Forlimpopoli, Italy
- Height: 1.86 m (6 ft 1 in)
- Position: Defender

Youth career
- 1995–1996: Cesena

Senior career*
Years	Team	Apps	(Gls)
1996–1997	Cesena	22	(1)
1997–1998	Monza	2	(0)
1998–2000	Milan	0	(0)
1998–1999	→ Monza (loan)	4	(0)
1999–2000	→ Cremonese (loan)	21	(2)
2000	→ Livorno (loan)	2	(0)
2000	Parma	0	(0)
2000–2002	Castel di Sangro	36	(0)
2002–2003	Pescara	28	(1)
2003–2004	Teramo	18	(0)
2004–2006	Sambenedettese	50	(3)
2006–2007	Foggia	25	(2)
2007–2008	Lucchese	9	(1)
2008	→ Foggia (loan)	8	(3)
2008–2009	Foggia	27	(3)
2009–2010	Bassano	14	(2)
2010–2011	Pro Patria	30	(3)
2011–2012	Rimini	17	(1)
- * Club domestic league appearances and goals as of 30 June 2012

Gianluca Zanetti (born 2 July 1977) is an Italian former footballer who played as a defender. Throughout his career, he played over 200 matches in the Lega Pro Prima Divisione, the third-highest level of Italian football.

== Career ==
Born in Forlimpopoli, the Province of Forlì-Cesena, Zanetti started his career at Cesena. He then left for Serie B side Monza. In January 1998, he was signed by AC Milan but played nil match. In 1998–99 season, he returned to Monza on loan. In the next season, he played at Serie C2 side Cremonese. In 2000–01 season, he left for Livorno on loan. But in October 2000, he swapped club with Alessio Sarti but immediate left for Serie C1 side Castel di Sangro, where he regularly picked up by the coach. In January 2002 he left for Serie C1 side Pescara, where he won promotion playoffs in 2003.

In 2003–04 season, he left for Serie C1 side Teramo but failed to play regularly.

=== Sambenedettese ===
In 2004, he was transferred to Sambenedettese but faced a knee injury. In April 2005, he was offered a new 2-year contract with Sambenedettese. In October 2005 he returned from injury and played his first match of the season. He was the regular of the team, and became the team captain. After the resignation of the coach, he worked with teammate Gianluca Colonnello, who also worked as caretaker manager to manager the team.

=== Foggia ===
In next season he left for Serie C1 side Foggia, signed a 1-year contract. He was ruled out from squad by injury in March 2007. In July 2007, he left for Serie C1 side Lucchese. In January 2008, he returned to Foggia on loan. In July 2008 he deal became permanent after the bankrupt of Lucchese. He played regularly for Foggina including the two promotion playoffs, which lost to Benevento.

=== Bassano ===
In July 2009, Zanetti left for Seconda Divisione side Bassano, signed a 2-year contract. He missed the whole October due to injury and again in February for another injury.

In July 2011 he was signed by Rimini.
