= Giovanni Serrapica =

Giovanni Serrapica may refer to:

- John Serry, Sr. (Giovanni Serrapica, 1915–2003), concert accordionist, arranger and composer
- John Serry Jr. (John Serrapica Jr., born 1954), US musician
- Giovanni Serrapica (footballer) (born 1981), Italian footballer
