= Ivan Aiardi =

Italian footballer (born 1971)

Personal information
- Date of birth: 16 January 1971 (age 55)
- Place of birth: Milan, Italy
- Height: 1.89 m (6 ft 2 in)
- Position: Goalkeeper

Youth career
- Monza

Senior career*
Years	Team	Apps	(Gls)
1990–1995	Monza	24	(0)
1992–1994	→ Corsico (loan)	57	(0)
1995–2000	Lecce	6	(0)
1998–1999	→ Andria (loan)	13	(0)
2000–2001	Messina	7	(0)
2000–2001	→ Monza (loan)	1	(0)
2001–2003	Gualdo	55	(0)
2003–2004	Rosetana	28	(0)
	Francavilla	?	(?)
2007–2008	Copertino	?	(?)
2009–2010	Toma Maglie	?	(?)
Total		191	(0)
- * Club domestic league appearances and goals

Ivan Aiardi (born 16 January 1971) is an Italian former professional footballer who played as a goalkeeper.

== Career ==
=== Monza ===
Aiardi started his professional career at Monza, at that time part of the Province of Milan. After the relegation to Serie C1 in 1990, he was promoted to first team, as 3rd keeper behind Paolo Mancini and Massimiliano Caniato. In summer 1992, he left for Serie D side Corsico where he played 2 seasons at Corsico, the Province of Milan. In 2004–95 season, he returned to Monza and played as first choice for the Serie C1 campaign, ahead Christian Abbiati.

=== Lecce ===
He then left for Serie C1 side Lecce, as backup goalkeeper of Fabrizio Lorieri along with Giuseppe Gatta. He won Serie C1 champion in 1996. He continued to play for Lecce at Serie B as Lorieri's backup ahead Alessandro Quarta. He played his first Serie B on round 38 (last round), against Cesena which certainly relegated after the season. He replaced Lorieri in the 85th minutes, which Lecce scored the 3rd goal by Francesco Palmieri. The match Lecce won Cesena 3–0 and secured the promotion. Lecce finished 3rd with 63 points, ahead Genoa (the 5th) with only 2 points and first 4 teams promoted to Serie A.

In 1997–98 season, he secured a place in Lecce Serie A plan. He played his first Serie A match on 11 February 1998, replaced Lorieri's in the 87th minutes, which Lecce already lost 1–3 to A.S. Roma. In round 33, he second last round, Lecce which certainly relegated was against mid-table side Sampdoria. Aiardi substituted Lorieri in the 5th minutes and the match ended in 1–1 draw in Stadio Luigi Ferraris. In the last round, Aiardi was the starting keeper with Quarta as backup, that match Lecce lost to Piacenza in 1–3 at home.

In 1998–99, he was loaned to league rival Serie B side Andria. He played the first 13 matches at first choice, ahead Cristiano Lupatelli. But under the new coach Giorgio Rumignani, he chosen Lupatelli as first choice. Andria relegated at the end of season and Aiardi returned to Lecce, which the team has won promotion to Serie A again. Aiardi worked as 3rd goalkeeper again, behind Antonio Chimenti and Massimo Lotti. Lecce secured a place in next Serie A season before the start of last round, and that match (round 34) Aiardi substituted Chimenti in the 76th minutes and concerned 1 more goal. The match ended in a 1–4 loss to Parma.

=== Returned to Monza ===
In 2000–01 season, he left for Serie C1 side Messina, but in October he left for Serie B side Monza, as 3rd goalkeeper behind youth keeper Luca Redaelli and first choice Gabriele Aldegani, to provide extra cover in keeper role due to the left of Jean-François Gillet. After Aldegani was injured in the round 13, he made his single appearances on round 15, 10 December 2000, a 1–5 loss to Chievo. In January 2001, Monza signed Alex Calderoni and the coach preferred Redaelli on the bench and Calderoni played on the field. That season Monza relegated again. He returned to Messina in 2001 which the team promoted from Serie C1. As the club had Emanuele Manitta, Vincenzo Marruocco and Quarta, he was sent to Gualdo.

=== Late career ===
Aiardi played two Serie C2 seasons for Gualdo as a regular starter. He then left for Rosetana of Serie C2. In October 2009, he joined Toma Maglie of Eccellenza Apulia (Italian 6th level). but soon left the club. He also played for Eccellenza Apulia side Francavilla and Copertino.

== Honours ==
Lecce

- Serie C1: 1996
