= Massimo Lotti =

Italian footballer

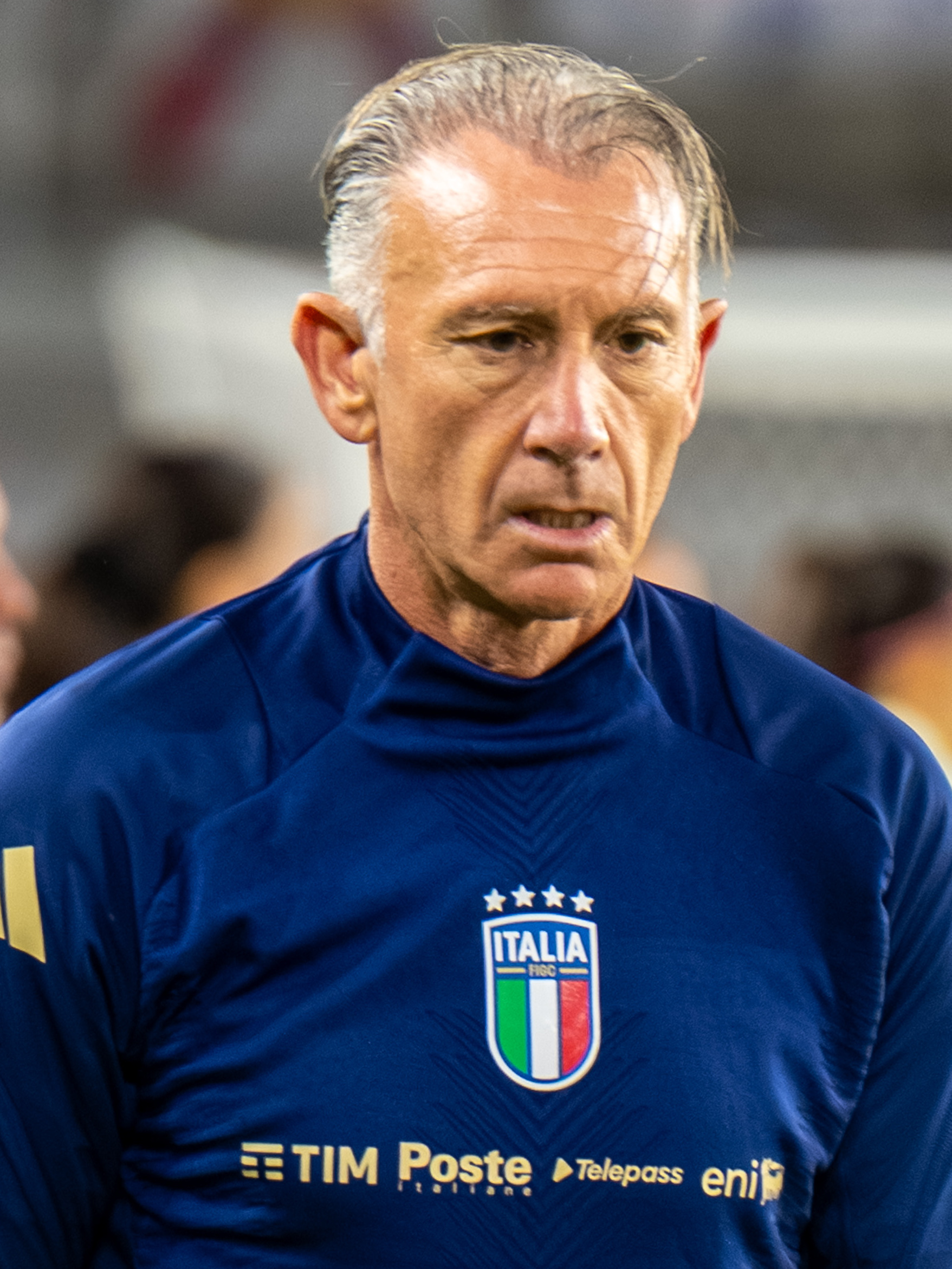

Personal information
- Full name: Massimo Lotti
- Date of birth: 7 March 1969 (age 57)
- Place of birth: Formia, Italy
- Height: 1.88 m (6 ft 2 in)
- Position: Goalkeeper

Senior career*
Years	Team	Apps	(Gls)
1991–1993	Arzanese	65	(0)
1993–1996	Albanova	94	(0)
1996–1998	Castel di Sangro	43	(0)
1998–2001	Lecce	4	(0)
2001–2002	Arezzo	13	(0)
2002–2005	Benevento	85	(0)
2005–2010	Venezia	66	(0)
- * Club domestic league appearances and goals

Massimo Lotti (born 7 March 1969) is an Italian footballer who played as a goalkeeper. He spent half of his career at Lega Pro (ex-Serie C).

== Career ==
Born in Formia, Lazio, halfway between Rome, Lazio and Naples, Campania, Lotti started his senior career at Serie D side Arzanese, which located at Arzano, the Province of Naples. He then left for another Serie D side Albanova which located at Casal di Principe, Campania. He won promotion in 1994 and played 2 seasons at Serie C2. In summer 1996, he joined Serie B side Castel di Sangro.

In summer 1998, he was signed by Serie B side Lecce and played as Fabrizio Lorieri's backup along with Vincenzo Marruocco. Lecce won promotion in June 1999 and the club signed Antonio Chimenti as first choice and Lotti worked as backup along with Ivan Aiardi. He played his only match at Serie A on 24 October 1999, a 2–4 loss to Lazio. In summer 2001, he left for Serie C1 side Arezzo, which he shared the starting role with Marco Giannitti and Alessio Sarti. In summer 2002, he joined Serie C1 side Benevento where he was the first choice. In summer 2005, he was signed by newly formed Serie C2 S.S.C. Venezia, which replaced the bankrupted A.C. Venezia. He was the first choice at the first season, played 23 league matches. At the end of season, he was offered a new 2-year contract. In the next season, Venezia signed Giuseppe Aprea and played as first choice. In 2007–08 season, he shared the first choice role with Aprea and mid-season signing Enrico Alfonso also played 7 times. But in 2008–09 season, Aprea resume as starting keeper. After the bankrupt of SSC Venezia, he remained at Venice for newly formed Serie D side Unione Venezia. He retired as a player in 2011, and became goalkeeper coach for Venezia in 2014.

== Honours ==
Venezia

- Serie C2: 2006
