= Domenico Cristiano =

Italian football coach and player (born 1976)

Personal information
- Full name: Domenico Cristiano
- Date of birth: 29 March 1976 (age 50)
- Place of birth: Ravenna, Italy
- Height: 1.75 m (5 ft 9 in)
- Position: Midfielder

Team information
- Current team: Castel di Sangro (head coach)

Senior career*
Years	Team	Apps	(Gls)
1993–1995	Lazio	1	(0)
1995–1996	Venezia	5	(0)
1996–1998	Castel di Sangro	56	(3)
1998–1999	Monza	26	(3)
1999–2001	Salernitana	28	(1)
2000	→ Fermana (loan)	10	(0)
2001–2003	Napoli	17	(0)
2003	→ Ascoli (loan)	9	(0)
2003–2006	Ascoli	70	(4)
2006–2008	Rimini	47	(1)
2008–2011	Pro Patria	54	(1)

Managerial career
- 2019–: Castel di Sangro
- * Club domestic league appearances and goals

Domenico Cristiano (born 29 March 1976) is an Italian football coach and former player. He is currently in charge as head coach of Promozione amateurs Castel di Sangro.

== Playing career ==
Born in Ravenna, Cristiano started his career at S.S. Lazio youth system. He made his Serie A debut on 10 April 1994 against Atalanta B.C. He then spent his career at Serie B clubs. In 1999, he joined Salernitana. In June 2001 he was signed by Napoli tagged for 5.25 billion lire (€2.71 million), and exchanged with Giorgio Di Vicino tagged for 5.5 billion lire (€2.84 million), thus only 250 million lire involved (€129,114). In summer 2005, Ascoli promoted due to Caso Genoa and Torino faced bankrupt, Cristiano played 16 games for the newcomer, including 10 start. At the end of season, he joined Rimini of Serie B.

== Coaching career ==
In June 2019, he was named new head coach of Promozione club Castel di Sangro.
