= 1997 Torneo di Viareggio =

1997 Torneo Mondiale di Calcio Coppa Carnevale
49° Torneo di Viareggio

Tournament details
- Host country: Italy
- City: Viareggio
- Dates: January 25, 1997 - February 10, 1997
- Teams: 32

Final positions
- Champions: (Italy) Bari
- Runners-up: (Italy) Torino
- Third place: (Italy) Cremonese
- Fourth place: (Italy) Napoli

Tournament statistics
- Matches played: 64
- Goals scored: 150 (2.34 per match)

The 1997 winners of the Torneo di Viareggio (in English, the Viareggio Tournament, officially the Viareggio Cup World Football Tournament Coppa Carnevale), the annual youth football tournament held in Viareggio, Tuscany, are listed below.

== Format ==
The 32 teams are seeded in 8 groups. Each team from a group meets the others in a single tie. The winning club and runners-up from each group progress to the final knockout stage. All matches in the final rounds are single tie. The Round of 16 envisions penalties and no extra time, while the rest of the final round matches include 30 minutes extra time and penalties to be played if the draw between teams still holds. Semifinal losing teams play 3rd-place final with penalties after regular time. The winning sides play the final with extra time and repeat the match if the draw holds.

== Participating teams ==
Italian teams

- (Italy) Atalanta
- (Italy) Bari
- (Italy) Brescia
- (Italy) Castel di Sangro
- (Italy) Cosenza
- (Italy) Cremonese
- (Italy) Empoli
- (Italy) Fiorentina
- (Italy) Inter Milan
- (Italy) Juventus
- (Italy) Lecce
- (Italy) Lucchese
- (Italy) Milan
- (Italy) Napoli
- (Italy) Parma
- (Italy) Perugia
- (Italy) Roma
- (Italy) Torino
- (Italy) Udinese
- (Italy) Viareggio
- (Italy) Verona
- (Italy) Vicenza

European teams

- (Czech Republic) Slavia Prague
- (England) Manchester United
- (Netherlands) Ajax
- (Germany) Werder Bremen
- (Germany) Borussia Dortmund
- (Denmark) Brøndby
- (Spain) RCD Espanyol

American teams

- (Mexico) Pumas

Oceanian teams

- (Australia) Marconi Stallions
- (Australia) Goldfields

== Group stage ==
=== Group 1 ===
Team	Pts	Pld	W	D	L	GF	GA	GD
(Italy) Perugia	5	3	1	2	0	4	1	+3
(Italy) Viareggio	5	3	1	2	0	3	1	+2
(Italy) Fiorentina	5	3	1	2	0	2	1	+1
(Czech Republic) Slavia Prague	0	3	0	0	3	1	7	-6

=== Group 2 ===
Team	Pts	Pld	W	D	L	GF	GA	GD
(Italy) Udinese	7	3	2	1	0	3	1	+2
(Italy) Torino	6	3	2	0	1	4	1	+3
(Australia) Marconi Stallions	2	3	0	2	1	1	3	-2
(England) Manchester United	1	3	0	1	2	2	5	-3

=== Group 3 ===
Team	Pts	Pld	W	D	L	GF	GA	GD
(Italy) Parma	7	3	2	1	0	5	1	+4
(Italy) Roma	6	3	2	0	1	5	3	+2
(Netherlands) Ajax	3	3	1	0	2	3	6	-3
(Italy) Empoli	1	3	0	1	2	1	4	-3

=== Group 4 ===
Team	Pts	Pld	W	D	L	GF	GA	GD
(Italy) Lecce	7	3	2	1	0	8	2	+6
(Italy) Napoli	7	3	2	1	0	5	2	+3
(Italy) Vicenza	1	3	0	1	2	2	6	-4
(Germany) Werder Bremen	1	3	0	1	2	4	9	-5

=== Group 5 ===
Team	Pts	Pld	W	D	L	GF	GA	GD
(Italy) Lucchese	6	3	2	0	0	5	3	+2
(Italy) Milan	5	3	1	2	0	3	2	+1
(Italy) Verona	4	3	1	1	0	5	4	+1
(Denmark) Brøndby	1	3	0	1	2	1	5	-4

=== Group 6 ===
Team	Pts	Pld	W	D	L	GF	GA	GD
(Italy) Bari	6	3	2	0	1	8	3	+5
(Italy) Inter Milan	4	3	1	1	1	2	2	0
(Germany) Borussia Dortmund	4	3	1	1	1	6	8	-2
(Italy) Castel di Sangro	3	3	1	0	2	3	6	-3

=== Group 7 ===
Team	Pts	Pld	W	D	L	GF	GA	GD
(Italy) Atalanta	7	3	2	1	0	5	3	+2
(Italy) Cremonese	5	3	1	2	0	6	5	+1
(Italy) Brescia	2	3	0	2	1	7	8	-1
(Mexico) Pumas	1	3	0	1	2	3	5	-2

=== Group 8 ===
Team	Pts	Pld	W	D	L	GF	GA	GD
(Italy) Cosenza	6	3	2	0	1	4	2	+2
(Italy) Juventus	6	3	2	0	1	3	1	+2
(Spain) RCD Espanyol	6	3	2	0	1	3	1	+2
(Australia) Goldfields	0	3	0	0	3	1	7	-6

== Knockout stage ==
Round of 16
5 february
(Italy) Bari (pen)	0 (4)
(Italy) Milan	0 (3)
5 february
(Italy) Juventus (pen)	1 (4)
(Italy) Atalanta	1 (2)
5 february
(Italy) Cremonese (pen)	2 (2)
(Italy) Cosenza	2 (1)
5 february
(Italy) Inter Milan	3
(Italy) Lucchese	2
5 february
(Italy) Torino (pen)	0 (4)
(Italy) Perugia	0 (2)
5 february
(Italy) Lecce	3
(Italy) Roma	1
5 february
(Italy) Napoli	1
(Italy) Parma	0
5 february
(Italy) Viareggio	1
(Italy) Udinese	0

Quarter-finals
6 february
(Italy) Bari	2
(Italy) Juventus	1
6 february
(Italy) Cremonese	1
(Italy) Inter Milan	0
6 february
(Italy) Torino	2
(Italy) Lecce	0
6 february
(Italy) Napoli (pen)	0 (4)
(Italy) Viareggio	0 (2)

Semi-finals
8 february
(Italy) Bari (pen)	1 (4)
(Italy) Cremonese	1 (3)
8 february
(Italy) Torino	2
(Italy) Napoli	1

Final
10 february
(Italy) Bari	1
(Italy) Torino	0
Third place
10 february
(Italy) Cremonese	3
(Italy) Napoli	0

== Champions ==
Torneo di Viareggio 1997 Champions

Bari
1st time
