= Matteo Guardalben =

Italian footballer

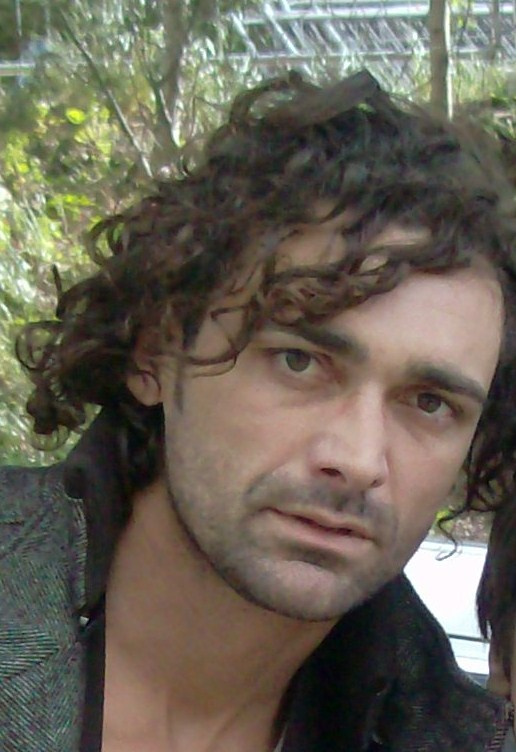

Personal information
- Date of birth: 5 June 1974 (age 52)
- Place of birth: Nogara, Italy
- Height: 1.88 m (6 ft 2 in)
- Position: Goalkeeper

Youth career
- 1991–1994: Verona

Senior career*
Years	Team	Apps	(Gls)
1994–1997	Verona	30	(0)
1994–1995	→ Massese (loan)	27	(0)
1997–2001	Parma	3	(0)
2001–2004	Piacenza	80	(0)
2004–2006	Palermo	43	(0)
2006	→ Parma (loan)	6	(0)
2006–2008	Vicenza	13	(0)
2008–2009	Treviso	25	(0)
2009–2010	Sampdoria	0	(0)
2010–2012	Modena	17	(0)
Total		244	(0)
- * Club domestic league appearances and goals

Matteo Guardalben (born 5 June 1974) is an Italian former professional football goalkeeper.

== Club career ==
Guardalben was born in Nogara, Province of Verona. After five seasons with Parma, Guardalben (along with Nicola Mora and Matuzalém) joined Piacenza in a co-ownership deal. Half of Guardalben's rights was valued for 3 billion lire.

Guardalben was exchanged with Cristiano Lupatelli in January 2006.

Guardalben signed a three-year contract with Vicenza of Serie B in July 2006, as Adriano Zancopè's backup, but he was injured in October and back to squad in May 2007.

In the next season, he became the first choice since November 2007, until February 2008 the arrival of Marco Fortin.

In summer 2009, he was signed by Serie A club Sampdoria as third-choice keeper, and never played a single game during his stay with the blucerchiati. In July 2010 he was signed by Serie B club Modena in a free transfer.

== International career ==
In 2005, Guardalben was called up three times by the Italy national football team, all as unused substitute.
