= Alessio Sarti =

Italian footballer (born 1979)

Personal information
- Date of birth: 8 September 1979 (age 47)
- Place of birth: Florence, Italy
- Height: 1.87 m (6 ft 1 1/2 in)
- Position: Goalkeeper

Youth career
- 1997–1998: Prato

Senior career*
Years	Team	Apps	(Gls)
1998–2000	Parma	0	(0)
1998–1999	→ Prato (loan)	23	(0)
1999–2000	→ Ravenna (loan)	14	(0)
2000–2006	A.C. Milan	0	(0)
2000–2001	→ Ravenna (loan)	13	(0)
2001–2002	→ Arezzo (loan)	12	(0)
2002–2003	→ Prato (loan)	30	(0)
2003–2005	→ Lucchese (loan)	59	(0)
2005–2006	→ Cesena (loan)	1	(0)
2006–2009	Cesena	30	(0)
Total		182	(0)
- * Club domestic league appearances and goals

Alessio Sarti (born 8 September 1979) is an Italian former footballer who played as a goalkeeper.

== Career ==
=== Prato ===
Born in Florence, Tuscany, Sarti started his career at Tuscany club Prato. He then sold to Parma and loaned back to Prato. In 1998–99 season, he played as a regular of the team at Serie C2 after the left of Gabriele Aldegani.

=== Parma, Milan and loans ===
During the 1999–2000 season, he left for Serie B side Ravenna, as Giovanni Cervone's backup. In October 2000, he swapped club with Gianluca Zanetti to A.C. Milan but remained at Ravenna. At Ravenna, he competed with Alex Calderoni and Gilbert Bodart and none of them were absolute starter. Ravenna relegated that season and concerned the second highest goals.

In 2001–02 season, he left for Serie C1 side Arezzo, he competed with Massimo Lotti and Marco Giannitti, again none them were the absolute regular starter. In 2002–03 season, he returned to Prato and played as regular and earned a switch to Lucchese in co-ownership deal. At Lucchese he was the regular starter and helped the club reach the promotion playoffs, although they lost to Lumezzane in the first round (semi-final). In June 2004 Milan bought back Sarti and loaned him back to Lucchese as the 1st choice.

=== Cesena ===
In July 2005, he was loaned to Serie B side Cesena, as Luigi Turci's backup. In March 2006 he deal became permanent. In 2006–07 season he was the regular starter along with Turci. In 2007–08 season he competed with Gianluca Berti then injuries made him unable to play. In January 2008 the club signed Artur as the new first choice. He had an operation on his left knee in March 2008.

In his last season with Cesena, he faced injuries problem and unable to play the whole season. After the team won Lega Pro Prima Divisione, he was released.
