= Guidoni =

Guidoni is an Italian surname. Notable people with the surname include:

- Alessandro Guidoni (1880–1928), Italian Air Force general
- Dorival Guidoni Junior (born 1972), Brazilian retired footballer
- Jean Guidoni (1952–2025), French singer and songwriter
- Stefano Guidoni (born 1971), Italian footballer
- Umberto Guidoni (born 1954), Italian astrophysicist, science writer and a former ESA astronaut,

== See also ==
- 10605 Guidoni, asteroid
- Guideschi
- Valter Giuliani
