= 2004–05 Serie B =

Italian football league season

Serie B TIM
- Season: 2004–05
- Promoted: Empoli (1st title); Ascoli; Treviso
- Relegated: Genoa; Perugia; Salernitana; Venezia (to C2)
- Matches: 462
- Goals: 1,098 (2.38 per match)
- Top goalscorer: (Italy) Gionatha Spinesi (22 goals)

Serie B 2004-05 team distribution

The 2004–05 Serie B is the 73rd season since its establishment in 1929. It is the second highest football league in Italy.

== Teams ==
Arezzo, Catanzaro, Cesena and Crotone had been promoted from Serie C, while Perugia, Modena, and Empoli had been relegated from Serie A, and Ancona had lost their national professional licence.

=== Stadiums and locations ===
Team	Home city	Stadium	2003–04 season
AlbinoLeffe	Albino and Leffe	Stadio Atleti Azzurri d'Italia (Bergamo)	18th in Serie B
Arezzo	Arezzo	Stadio Città di Arezzo	Serie C1 Group A champions
Ascoli	Ascoli Piceno	Stadio Cino e Lillo Del Duca	11th in Serie B
Bari	Bari	Stadio San Nicola	21st in Serie B
Catania	Catania	Stadio Angelo Massimino	9th in Serie B
Catanzaro	Catanzaro	Stadio Nicola Ceravolo	Serie C1 Group B champions
Cesena	Cesena	Stadio Dino Manuzzi	Serie C1 Group A play-off winners
Crotone	Crotone	Stadio Ezio Scida	Serie C1 Group B play-off winners
Empoli	Empoli	Stadio Carlo Castellani	17th in Serie A
Genoa	Genoa	Stadio Luigi Ferraris	16th in Serie B
Hellas Verona	Verona	Stadio Marcantonio Bentegodi	19th in Serie B
Modena	Modena	Stadio Alberto Braglia	16th in Serie A
Perugia	Perugia	Stadio Renato Curi	15th in Serie A
Pescara	Pescara	Stadio Adriatico	22nd in Serie B
Piacenza	Piacenza	Stadio Leonardo Garilli	8th in Serie B
Salernitana	Salerno	Stadio Arechi	17th in Serie B
Ternana	Terni	Stadio Libero Liberati	7th in Serie B
Torino	Turin	Stadio delle Alpi	12th in Serie B
Treviso	Treviso	Stadio Omobono Tenni	15th in Serie B
Triestina	Trieste	Stadio Nereo Rocco	10th in Serie B
Venezia	Venice	Stadio Pierluigi Penzo	20th in Serie B
Vicenza	Vicenza	Stadio Romeo Menti	13th in Serie B

=== Personnel and kits ===
Team	President	Manager	Kit manufacturer	Shirt sponsor
AlbinoLeffe	(Italy) Gianfranco Andreoletti	(Italy) Elio Gustinetti	Legea	SCAME
Arezzo	(Italy) Piero Mancini	(Italy) Pasquale Marino	Legea	Banca Etruria
Ascoli	(Italy) Roberto Benigni	(Italy) Marco Giampaolo and (Italy) Massimo Silva	Uhlsport	Carisap
Bari	(Italy) Vincenzo Matarrese	(Italy) Guido Carboni	Lotto	Pasta Ambra
Catania	(Italy) Antonino Pulvirenti	(Italy) Nedo Sonetti	Galex	SP Energia Siciliana, Regione Siciliana
Catanzaro	(Italy) Claudio Parente	(Italy) Bruno Bolchi	Asics	Catanzaro città tra due mari, Caffè Guglielmo
Cesena	(Italy) Giorgio Lugaresi	(Italy) Fabrizio Castori	Lotto	Solo Affitti
Crotone	(Italy) Raffaele Vrenna	(Italy) Gian Piero Gasperini	Devis	Sovreco (H)/Frais Monde (A)
Empoli	(Italy) Fabrizio Corsi	(Italy) Mario Somma	Asics	Computer Gross
Genoa	(Italy) Enrico Preziosi	(Italy) Serse Cosmi	Asics	Costa Cruises
Hellas Verona	(Italy) Giambattista Pastorello	(Italy) Massimo Ficcadenti	Legea	Clerman
Modena	(Italy) Romano Amadei	(Italy) Stefano Pioli	Erreà	Immergas, Alberti & Tagliazucchi
Perugia	(Italy) Alessandro Gaucci	(Italy) Stefano Colantuono	Galex	Mobili Paolo
Pescara	(Italy) Dante Paterna	(Italy) Giovanni Simonelli	Ennedue	Eurovision TV
Piacenza	(Italy) Fabrizio Garilli	(Italy) Giuseppe Iachini	Lotto	UNICEF
Salernitana	(Italy) Aniello Aliberti	(Italy) Angelo Gregucci	Devis	Centrale del Latte di Salerno/Caffè Motta
Ternana	(Italy) Luigi Agarini	(Italy) Claudio Tobia	Erreà	None
Torino	(Italy) Attilio Romero	(Italy) Renato Zaccarelli	Asics	Bavaria
Treviso	(Italy) Ettore Setten	(Italy) Giuseppe Pillon	Lotto	Segafredo, Provincia di Treviso
Triestina	(Italy) Amilcare Berti	(Italy) Attilio Tesser	Asics	Bossini
Venezia	(Italy) Francesco Dal Cin	(Italy) Andrea Manzo	Sportika	Boscolo Tours
Vicenza	(Italy) (Egypt) Sergio Cassingena	(Italy) Maurizio Viscidi	Biemme	Caffè Vero, Supermercati SISA

== Events ==
Following the long-standing consequences of the "Caso Catania", the league included 22 teams, while promotions decreased to three spots.

Promotion playoffs were also introduced.

== Final classification ==
Pos	Team	Pld	W	D	L	GF	GA	GD	Pts	Promotion or relegation
1	Empoli (P, C)	42	19	17	6	72	44	+28	74	Promotion to Serie A
2	Torino (Note: Originally promoted to Serie A after play-off but later not admitted for financial problems. New club created by the Lodo Petrucci.) (O, E)	42	21	11	10	49	31	+18	74	Phoenix without promotion
3	Perugia (Note: New club in Serie C1 by the Lodo Petrucci for financial problems.) (E, R)	42	21	11	10	56	34	+22	74	Phoenix in Serie C1
4	Treviso (Note: Promoted to Serie A in place of Torino and Perugia.) (P)	42	18	10	14	58	48	+10	64	Promotion to Serie A
5	Ascoli (P)	42	17	11	14	51	52	−1	62	Promotion to Serie A
6	Hellas Verona	42	15	16	11	60	47	+13	61	
7	Modena (Note: 1 point deducted.)	42	16	14	12	47	37	+10	61	
8	Ternana	42	14	15	13	51	54	−3	57	
9	Piacenza	42	16	8	18	44	46	−2	56	
10	Bari	42	13	17	12	41	37	+4	55	
11	AlbinoLeffe	42	14	13	15	55	51	+4	55	
12	Catania	42	13	16	13	42	44	−2	55	
13	Salernitana (E, R)	42	12	15	15	50	57	−7	51	Phoenix in Serie C1
14	Arezzo	42	12	15	15	51	52	−1	51	
15	Cesena	42	12	14	16	47	61	−14	50	
16	Crotone (Note: 3 points deducted.)	42	13	14	15	48	45	+3	50	
17	Vicenza (Note: Vicenza was restored in Serie B following Genoa conviction.)	42	12	13	17	59	67	−8	49	Relegation play-off (annulled)
18	Triestina	42	12	12	18	43	54	−11	48	Relegation play-off (annulled)
19	Pescara (Note: Spared from relegation following Salernitana's and Perugia's bankruptcy.) (T)	42	10	16	16	43	61	−18	46	Spared from relegation
20	Venezia (Note: Dissolved due to bankruptcy. A new entity was admitted to Serie C2 by Lodo Petrucci. The team was also involved in Caso Genoa.) (R, E, D)	42	7	14	21	33	58	−25	35	Phoenix in Serie C2
21	Catanzaro (T)	42	5	11	26	40	82	−42	26	Spared from relegation
22	Genoa (Note: Put in the last place by the FIGC because of match fixing in the Caso Genoa.) (D, R)	42	19	19	4	72	44	+28	76	Relegation to Serie C1

Source: Almanacco Illustrato del Calcio 2006, Panini Edizioni, Modena, November 2005
Rules for classification: 1) points; 2) head-to-head points; 3) head-to-head goal difference; 4) head-to-head goals scored; 5) goal difference; 6) number of goals scored.
(C) Champions; (D) Disqualified; (E) Eliminated; (O) Play-off winners; (P) Promoted; (R) Relegated; (T) Qualified, but not yet for the particular phase indicated

== Results ==
Home \ Away	ALB	ARE	ASC	BAR	CTN	CTZ	CES	CRO	EMP	GEN	MOD	PER	PES	PIA	SAL	TER	TOR	TRV	TRI	VEN	HEL	VIC
AlbinoLeffe	—	1–0	1–2	0–1	1–0	1–1	1–1	1–1	0–0	0–3	2–0	0–1	4–0	3–0	1–2	3–1	2–1	2–2	3–3	1–0	1–1	2–1
Arezzo	1–1	—	0–0	2–1	3–1	2–1	1–1	3–0	1–1	2–2	1–2	1–2	1–1	2–0	1–0	1–2	0–0	0–1	1–2	1–0	2–1	3–0
Ascoli	2–3	2–2	—	3–1	1–2	1–0	4–0	0–2	1–1	0–3	1–0	0–1	1–0	1–0	3–2	0–0	0–3	2–1	1–1	1–0	2–1	2–0
Bari	1–1	1–0	0–1	—	1–0	1–1	1–1	0–0	4–1	0–1	2–2	1–1	1–1	1–0	1–3	1–2	0–1	1–1	2–0	2–0	1–0	3–0
Catania	0–0	1–1	2–2	0–1	—	2–0	2–0	1–0	1–3	1–3	0–1	0–0	2–1	1–1	2–1	2–0	1–0	3–0	2–1	1–1	1–1	1–0
Catanzaro	0–1	1–1	2–3	2–1	2–3	—	2–2	2–2	2–3	1–1	2–1	1–3	1–0	1–3	3–0	1–4	1–1	1–4	1–0	0–0	1–1	1–1
Cesena	2–1	0–1	1–2	1–1	1–0	2–1	—	1–0	3–3	1–1	3–0	0–1	1–1	1–0	1–1	2–0	1–0	3–4	1–0	1–1	0–1	1–3
Crotone	1–0	2–0	1–0	0–2	1–1	3–0	0–1	—	1–1	0–0	1–0	1–1	3–0	1–0	4–1	1–2	2–1	2–2	4–2	2–0	2–2	0–1
Empoli	1–0	1–1	2–1	0–0	0–0	2–0	0–0	0–0	—	0–0	2–1	1–0	2–1	0–0	3–0	1–1	3–0	0–1	2–0	5–2	1–0	2–1
Genoa	3–2	3–1	3–0	2–1	0–0	3–1	3–3	1–0	3–2	—	0–0	0–1	2–0	1–0	5–0	1–1	0–0	2–1	2–2	3–2	1–1	5–2
Modena	2–2	1–1	0–1	0–0	1–0	2–0	4–0	2–0	1–1	1–1	—	2–1	0–0	1–0	1–0	4–0	0–0	1–1	0–1	1–0	2–0	2–1
Perugia	1–0	1–0	2–0	0–1	1–1	3–1	1–1	2–1	0–2	2–2	0–0	—	4–1	0–1	0–1	4–0	1–1	2–0	1–0	0–0	0–2	2–0
Pescara	1–3	2–2	0–2	2–2	2–2	3–2	2–1	1–4	1–0	2–2	2–0	2–1	—	1–2	0–2	1–1	0–2	1–0	2–1	0–0	1–1	4–0
Piacenza	1–1	3–0	3–1	1–1	0–1	2–1	2–1	3–0	1–3	2–2	1–0	2–4	0–1	—	0–1	0–2	1–0	3–2	0–0	2–1	1–0	0–0
Salernitana	1–1	2–0	2–1	2–2	1–0	0–0	6–1	1–1	1–1	4–0	2–2	0–2	0–2	3–2	—	1–1	0–0	0–0	3–3	0–0	1–2	3–1
Ternana	1–0	1–1	2–0	0–1	0–0	3–2	1–0	3–1	1–1	0–1	2–1	0–2	0–0	0–1	1–1	—	1–1	3–2	3–0	2–0	1–1	1–1
Torino	3–1	1–0	2–1	2–0	2–1	3–0	0–0	1–0	0–0	2–1	0–3	2–0	3–1	0–1	0–0	2–1	—	1–2	1–0	1–1	3–1	2–1
Treviso	0–2	1–4	1–1	2–0	0–0	2–0	3–1	2–2	0–1	3–0	1–2	1–0	1–1	1–1	1–0	3–1	0–1	—	2–0	3–0	1–0	2–0
Triestina	2–1	2–1	1–1	0–0	3–1	1–0	0–2	1–0	3–4	0–0	0–2	0–0	3–0	0–2	1–0	3–1	0–1	1–0	—	1–1	1–2	1–1
Venezia	0–2	1–2	1–1	1–0	1–1	2–0	0–2	0–0	1–0	0–3	0–0	2–4	1–1	1–0	2–0	3–3	0–3	1–2	1–2	—	3–2	2–0
Hellas Verona	3–2	5–3	2–2	0–0	4–0	4–1	2–1	0–0	0–1	1–1	3–0	1–2	1–1	1–0	1–1	2–2	2–0	2–1	0–0	1–0	—	5–3
Vicenza	4–1	1–1	1–1	0–0	2–2	5–0	4–1	3–2	2–1	2–2	2–2	2–2	0–0	4–2	4–1	1–0	1–2	0–1	2–1	2–1	0–0	—

Source: Almanacco Illustrato del Calcio 2006, Panini Edizioni, Modena, November 2005
Legend: Blue = home team win; Yellow = draw; Red = away team win.

== Play-off ==
=== Promotion play-off ===
(later became a relegation play-off)

Semi-finals

Team 1	Agg.	Team 2	1st leg	2nd leg
Ascoli	1-3	Torino	0-1	1-2
Treviso	0-3	Perugia	0-1	0-2

Finals

Team 1	Agg.	Team 2	1st leg	2nd leg
Perugia	2-2	Torino	1-2	1-0

Torino Calcio promoted to Serie A, but later it went bankrupt and it was restored in 2005–06 Serie B by the Lodo Petrucci. Perugia Calcio also went bankrupt and it was restored in 2005–06 Serie C1 by the Lodo Petrucci.

This promotion play-off consequently became a relegation play-off.

=== Relegation play-off ===
(later annulled)

Team 1	Agg.	Team 2	1st leg	2nd leg
Triestina	4-0	Vicenza	2-0	2-0

Vicenza Calcio was lucky because its relegation was annulled following the Caso Genoa.

== Attendances ==
#	Club	Average
1	Genoa	21,449
2	Hellas	10,948
3	Torino	10,003
4	Catania	8,931
5	Salernitana	8,840
6	Modena	7,915
7	Piacenza	7,812
8	Cesena	7,593
9	Vicenza	7,554
10	Perugia	6,717
11	Catanzaro	6,416
12	Triestina	6,333
13	Ascoli	6,095
14	Arezzo	5,561
15	Bari	4,891
16	Crotone	4,301
17	Treviso	4,015
18	Empoli	4,002
19	Ternana	3,887
20	Pescara	3,879
21	Venezia	2,207
22	AlbinoLeffe	1,722
