= Claudio Bonomi =

Italian footballer (born 1972)

Personal information
- Date of birth: 28 December 1972 (age 53)
- Place of birth: Codogno, Italy
- Height: 1.80 m (5 ft 11 in)
- Position: Midfielder

Senior career*
Years	Team	Apps	(Gls)
1990–1991	Fanfulla	28	(2)
1991–1992	Napoli	0	(0)
1992–1997	Castel di Sangro	146	(19)
1997–1998	Torino	13	(3)
1998–1999	Empoli	49	(3)
1999–2001	Lecce	24	(3)
2000	→ Sampdoria (loan)	11	(0)
2001	→ Pescara (loan)	11	(0)
2001–2002	Sampdoria	8	(0)
2002	→ Catania (loan)	15	(1)
2002–2003	Fiorentina	17	(1)
2003–2005	Reggiana	32	(2)
2004–2005	→ Pro Vasto (loan)	31	(3)
2005	Casale		
2006–2008	Castel di Sangro		
2008–2009	Sporting Aesernia		
Total		385	(37)

Managerial career
- 2010–2012: Castello 2000
- 2017–2019: Roccasicura
- 2021–2022: Volturnia Calcio
- 2022–2023: Castel di Sangro
- 2023–2024: Barisardo
- * Club domestic league appearances and goals

Claudio Bonomi (born 28 December 1972), is an Italian former professional footballer who played as a midfielder.

== Playing career ==
Having started his career at ASD Fanfulla, Bonomi played during the 1990s for several of the main teams in Italian football, such as Napoli, Empoli, Lecce and Sampdoria. In 2002–03, he was part of the champion squad for Fiorentina in Serie C2. He played in the last years of his career in the Eccellenza and Promozione categories.

== Managerial career ==
Bonomi became a coach soon after retiring, managing Castello 2000 in the Prima Categoria. His most recent work was at Barisardo, which competes in Eccellenza.

== Honours ==
Fiorentina

- Serie C2: 2002–03

Castel di Sangro

- Promozione: 2006–07
