= Nicola Mora =

Italian footballer (1979)

Personal information
- Date of birth: 31 July 1979 (age 47)
- Place of birth: Parma, Italy
- Height: 1.73 m (5 ft 8 in)
- Position: Left back

Youth career
- Parma

Senior career*
Years	Team	Apps	(Gls)
1997–2000	Parma	3	(0)
1998–2000	→ Napoli (loan)	47	(2)
2000–2001	Torino	11	(0)
2001–2002	Piacenza	15	(0)
2002–2006	Bari	86	(0)
2004–2005	→ Napoli (loan)	28	(0)
2007	Pescara	16	(0)
2007–2008	Foggia	26	(1)
2008–2011	Grosseto	96	(6)
2011–2012	Spezia	15	(0)
2012–2014	Ischia	11	(2)
2014	Arzanese	10	(0)
2014–2015	Frattese	28	(0)
2015–2017	Real Forio		

International career
2000	Italy U21	5	(0)
- * Club domestic league appearances and goals

Nicola Mora (born 31 July 1979) is an Italian former footballer who played as a defender.

== Career ==
Mora started his career at hometown club Parma. After played 3 league matches, he joined Napoli of Serie B in temporary deal and was signed by another second division club Torino in co-ownership deal for 2.3 billion lire (€1.188 million). In June 2001 Parma bought back Mora for undisclosed fee and re-sold him to newly promoted Serie A club Piacenza of Serie A in another co-ownership for 2 billion lire (€1.033 million). The club also acquired half of Matuzalém for 6 billion lire from Napoli via Parma and half of Matteo Guardalben for 3 billion lire from Parma directly. Moreover, half of the registration rights of Giuseppe Cardone was signed from Parma in de facto and Vicenza retained another half. In June 2002, the transfer of Mora and Guardalben became permanent for undisclosed fee (with Matuzalém returned to Parma), but Mora joined Bari of Serie B in July. He was the regular but in 2004–05 season loaned to Napoli which newly relegated to Serie C1. After he returned to Bari, he failed to become a regular starter, and joined Pescara of Serie B in 6-month contract.

After the relegation of Pescara, in August 2007, he joined Foggia of Serie C1 in 1-year deal.

In June 2008, he returned to Serie B football after 1 1/2 seasons, joined Grosseto.

In November 2011 he was re-signed by Spezia.

== Personal life ==
Mora is married to Flaminia and had a child; he is the brother-in-law of footballer Emanuele Calaiò, married to Flaminia's sister Federica. Mora and Calaiò both played for Torino in 2000–01 season and Napoli in 2004–05 season.
