= Mattia Fortin =

Italian footballer (born 2003)

Personal information
- Date of birth: 8 July 2003 (age 23)
- Place of birth: Noale, Italy
- Height: 1.97 m (6 ft 6 in)
- Position: Goalkeeper

Team information
- Current team: Palermo (on loan from Lens)
- Number: 14

Youth career
- Calvi Noale
- Padova

Senior career*
Years	Team	Apps	(Gls)
2023–2025	Padova	38	(0)
2023–2024	→ Legnago (loan)	39	(0)
2025–	Lens	0	(0)
2025–2026	→ Padova (loan)	14	(0)
2026–	→ Palermo (loan)	0	(0)
- * Club domestic league appearances and goals as of 13 May 2026

Mattia Fortin (born 8 July 2003) is an Italian professional footballer who plays as a goalkeeper for Serie B club Palermo, on loan from Ligue 1 club Lens.

== Club career ==
=== Youth and loan at Legnano ===
Born in Noale, in the Metropolitan City of Venice, Mattia Fortin is the son of former Siena, Cagliari and Vicenza goalkeeper Marco Fortin.

Mattia is a youth product of Padova, where he signed his first professional contract in August 2022, as he had already featured on the bench for the first team. He made his professional debut the following season on loan in Serie C with FC Legnago.

=== Debut in Padova ===
Following the departure of Antonio Donnarumma, Fortin made his debut with Padova on 4 August 2024, starting in a 3–1 Coppa Italia loss to Cesena, also playing in the following Coppa Serie C fixture against Feralpisalò, before becoming a regular starter and leader with the club, as they achieved promotion to Serie B, after they won the Serie C North championship. Main protagonist of the best defence in the league, standout performances from the goalkeeper included the two games against local rivals vice-champion and promotion favourites Vicenza.

=== Lens ===
On the summer 2025, after reports of moves to Serie A teams, he was transferred to Ligue 1 club RC Lens, but stayed on loan at Padova for the following Serie B season.

==== Loan to Palermo ====
On 18 July 2026, Fortin moved to Palermo on loan with an option to buy.

== Career statistics ==
As of match played 9 May 2026

Appearances and goals by club, season and competition
Club	Season	League			Cup		Europe		Other		Total	
Club	Season	Division	Apps	Goals	Apps	Goals	Apps	Goals	Apps	Goals	Apps	Goals
Padova	2023–24	Serie C	0	0	—		—		0	0	0	0
Padova	2024–25	Serie C	38	0	1	0	—		2 (Note: One appearance in Coppa Italia Serie C, one appearance in Supercoppa di Serie C)	0	41	0
Padova	Total		38	0	1	0	—		2	0	41	0
Legnago (loan)	2023–24	Serie C	39	0	—		—		0	0	39	0
Lens	2025–26	Ligue 1	0	0	0	0	—		—		0	0
Lens	2026–27	Ligue 1	0	0	0	0	0	0	0	0	0	0
Lens	Total		0	0	0	0	0	0	0	0	0	0
Padova (loan)	2025–26	Serie B	14	0	1	0	—		—		15	0
Career total			91	0	2	0	0	0	2	0	95	0
