= Pietro Spinosa =

Italian football manager

Personal information
- Date of birth: 5 January 1963 (age 63)
- Place of birth: Italy
- Position: Goalkeeper

Senior career*
Years	Team	Apps	(Gls)
–1982	Lavello		
1982–1984	Fasano		
1984–1989	Fidelis Andria	101+	(0+)
1989–1992	Team Altamura	97	(0)
1992–1994	Turris	46	(0)
1994–1995	Civitanovese		
1995–1997	Castel di Sangro	4	(0)

Managerial career
- 1997–1999: Savoia (goalkeeper coach)
- 1999: Williams Ephs (goalkeeper coach)
- 2001–2003: Livorno (goalkeeper coach)
- 2004–2009: Livorno (goalkeeper coach)
- 2009–2010: Eupen (goalkeeper coach)
- 2011: CFR Cluj (goalkeeper coach)
- 2011–2012: Chievo (goalkeeper coach)
- 2013: Williams Ephs (goalkeeper coach)
- 2014: Pune City (goalkeeper coach)
- 2020–: Ternana (goalkeeper coach)
- * Club domestic league appearances and goals

Pietro Spinosa (born 5 January 1963) is an Italian football manager who is the goalkeeper coach of Unione Sportiva Livorno Calcio.

== Career ==
=== Playing career ===
Spinosa started his career with Italian fourth tier side Lavello. In 1984, Spinosa signed for Fidelis Andria in the Italian third tier, where he made over 101 league appearances and scored 0 goals. In 1994, he signed for Italian fourth tier club Civitanovese.

In 1995, Spinosa signed for Castel di Sangro in the Italian third tier, where during the play-off final against Ascoli he was substituted on before the penalty shoot-out and made the decisive save, helping them earn promotion to the Italian second tier for the first time.

=== Managerial career ===
In 1997, Spinosa was appointed goalkeeper coach of Italian third-tier team Savoia. In 1999, he was appointed goalkeeper coach of Williams Ephs in the United States. In 2001, he was appointed goalkeeper coach of Italian third tier outfit Livorno. In 2004, Spinos returned to Livorno in the Italian Serie A. In 2009, he was appointed goalkeeper coach of Belgian second-tier side Eupen.

In 2011, he was appointed goalkeeper coach of CFR Cluj in the Romanian top flight. After that, Spinosa was appointed goalkeeper coach of Italian Serie A club Chievo. In 2013, he returned to Williams Ephs in the United States. In 2014, he was appointed goalkeeper coach of Indian top flight team Pune City. In 2020, Spinosa was appointed goalkeeper coach of Ternana in Italy.
