= Gianluca Colonnello =

Italian footballer

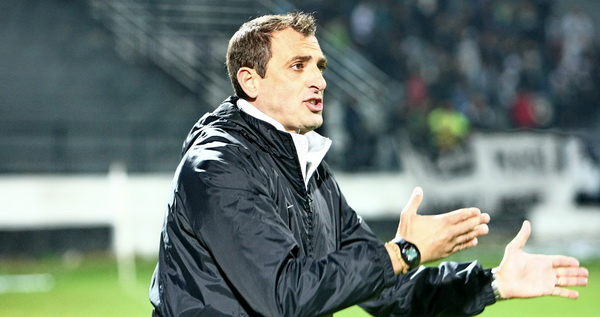

Personal information
- Date of birth: 8 February 1973 (age 53)
- Place of birth: Guardiagrele, Italy
- Height: 1.78 m (5 ft 10 in)
- Position: Left-back

Youth career
- 1981–1984: AS Tollo
- 1984–1989: Francavilla

Senior career*
Years	Team	Apps	(Gls)
1990–1993	Francavilla	49	(3)
1993–1995	Castel di Sangro	38	(1)
1995–1997	Pescara	62	(0)
1997–1999	Perugia	60	(1)
1999–2003	Lecce	76	(0)
2003–2004	Pescara	34	(0)
2004–2006	Sambenedettese	54	(0)
2006–2007	Pomezia	13	(0)
2007–2008	Santegidiese	12	(0)
2008–2009	Francavilla	3	(1)
Total		401	(6)

Managerial career
- 2006: Sambenedettese
- 2010–2011: Siena youth team
- 2011–2012: Borgo a Buggiano
- 2013–2014: Zakynthos
- 2015–2016: Zakynthos
- 2016: Pisa
- 2019–2020: AEK Athens (assistant)
- 2019–2020: AEK Athens
- 2021: Bari (Assistant)
- 2022–2023: Juventus Academy
- 2024: Sassuolo (coordinator)
- 2025: Ilisiakos
- * Club domestic league appearances and goals

Gianluca Colonnello (born 8 February 1973), is an Italian football coach and former player.

== Playing career ==
A left-back, Colonnello began his career with Francavilla in Serie C2, a division where he also played for Castel di Sangro, where he stood out. He was signed by Pescara in Serie B in 1995, and later played for Perugia, the club with which he gained access to Serie A. In 1999 Colonnello was signed by Lecce, a team for which he made 76 appearances in four seasons in Serie A. Still he returned to a new spell in Pescara, and later played for clubs in the lower divisions, ending his career at the same club where he started, Francavilla.

== Managerial career ==
Colonnello had his first experience as a coach at the end of the 2005–06 season, while defending Sambenedettese in Serie C1, where together with Gianluca Zanetti he finished the season after the coach Maurizio Simonato resigned. He later coached Siena's youth sectors, and Borgo a Buggiano in the Seconda Categoria.

For the 2013–14 season, he was the head coach of the Super League Greece 2 team Zakynthos, where he returned for the 2015–16 season.

He provisionally took over Pisa SC in July 2016, with the departure of Gennaro Gattuso to AC Milan Primavera, and was later sacked for his return. Became Massimo Carrera assistant in his spells at the AEK and Bari. It is worth noting that in AEK game for the Europa League against Zoria, the colonel took over as coach (due to Carrera illness).

His last job as a coach in the Juventus FC project in the United Arab Emirates, the Juventus Academy, and in 2024, Colonnello has worked as a coordinator at the Sassuolo in Serie A.
