= 2003–04 Serie B =

Italian football league season

Serie B TIM
- Season: 2003–04
- Promoted: Palermo (3rd title); Cagliari; Messina; Livorno; Atalanta; Fiorentina
- Relegated: Como; Avellino; Napoli
- Matches: 552
- Goals: 1,287 (2.33 per match)
- Top goalscorer: (Italy) Luca Toni (30 goals)

Serie B 2003-04 team distribution

The 2003–04 Serie B is the 72nd season since its establishment in 1929. It is the second highest football league in Italy.

This 46 matchdays championship was the longest tournament in all the history of the Italian football.

== Teams ==
Treviso, Avellino, AlbinoLeffe and Pescara had been promoted from Serie C, while Atalanta, Piacenza, Como, and Torino had been relegated from Serie A. Following the Caso Catania, Fiorentina was added.

=== Personnel and sponsoring ===
Team	Manager	Kit manufacturer	Shirt sponsor
AlbinoLeffe	(Italy) Elio Gustinetti	Legea	SCAME
Ascoli	(Italy) Aldo Ammazzalorso	Uhlsport	Carisap
Atalanta	(Italy) Andrea Mandorlini	Asics	Promatech
Avellino	(Czech Republic) Zdeněk Zeman	Devis	NewNet Gruppo Tufano
Bari	(Italy) Giuseppe Pillon	Lotto	Pasta Ambra
Cagliari	(Italy) Edoardo Reja	A-Line	Terra Sarda
Catania	(Italy) Nedo Sonetti	Galex	Toyota
Como	(Italy) Roberto Galia	Erreà	Integratori Integra Sport
Fiorentina	(Italy) Emiliano Mondonico	Adidas	Fondiaria-Sai
Genoa	(Italy) Luigi De Canio	Erreà	Costa Cruises
Hellas Verona	(Italy) Sergio Maddè	Legea	Clerman
Livorno	(Italy) Walter Mazzarri	Asics	Gruppo Banca Carige
Messina	(Italy) Bortolo Mutti	Legea	Confcommercio/Caffè Miscela d'Oro, Confcommercio
Napoli	(Italy) Luigi Simoni	Legea	Russo di Cicciano
Palermo	(Italy) Francesco Guidolin	Lotto	Provincia di Palermo, Regione Siciliana
Pescara	(Italy) Cetteo Di Mascio	Ennedue	Saquella Caffè
Piacenza	(Italy) Luigi Cagni	Lotto	UNICEF
Salernitana	(Italy) Stefano Pioli	Devis	Centrale del Latte di Salerno
Ternana	(Italy) Bruno Bolchi	Erreà	EnerTAD
Torino	(Italy) Ezio Rossi	Asics	Bavaria
Treviso	(Italy) Adriano Buffoni	Lotto	Segafredo, Provincia di Treviso
Triestina	(Italy) Attilio Tesser	Asics	San Marco Imaging
Venezia	(Italy) Angelo Gregucci	Sportika	Gioco Calcio
Vicenza	(Italy) Giuseppe Iachini	Biemme	Caffè Vero

== Events ==
Following the Caso Catania, the league had been expanded to 24 clubs, and six special promotions were decided to descend to 22.

Relegation play-offs were also introduced.

== Final classification ==
Pos	Team	Pld	W	D	L	GF	GA	GD	Pts	Promotion or relegation
1	Palermo (P, C)	46	22	17	7	75	39	+36	83	Promotion to Serie A
2	Cagliari (P)	46	23	14	9	80	51	+29	83	Promotion to Serie A
3	Livorno (P)	46	20	19	7	75	45	+30	79	Promotion to Serie A
4	Messina (P)	46	21	16	9	71	45	+26	79	Promotion to Serie A
5	Atalanta (P)	46	19	20	7	59	36	+23	77	Promotion to Serie A
6	Fiorentina (P)	46	19	16	11	53	48	+5	73	Promotion test-match
7	Ternana	46	18	15	13	64	52	+12	69	
8	Piacenza	46	17	17	12	50	47	+3	68	
9	Catania	46	18	13	15	53	53	0	67	
10	Triestina	46	15	19	12	50	50	0	64	
11	Ascoli	46	14	18	14	54	54	0	60	
12	Torino	46	14	17	15	57	54	+3	59	
13	Vicenza	46	12	20	14	48	51	−3	56	
14	Napoli (Note: Folded after bankruptcy, new entity re-admitted to Serie C1 by Lodo Petrucci.) (E, R)	46	10	26	10	35	43	−8	56	Phoenix in Serie C1
15	Treviso	46	12	19	15	48	51	−3	55	
16	Genoa	46	13	16	17	57	62	−5	55	
17	Salernitana	46	14	13	19	36	53	−17	55	
18	AlbinoLeffe	46	13	15	18	47	59	−12	54	
19	Hellas Verona	46	13	14	19	54	65	−11	53	
20	Venezia	46	12	15	19	40	57	−17	51	Relegation play-offs (annulled)
21	Bari (Note: Relegation play-off’s losers later readmitted in place of Napoli.) (T)	46	13	11	22	50	63	−13	50	Relegation play-offs (annulled)
22	Pescara (Note: Later readmitted after newly relegated Ancona's bankruptcy.) (T)	46	11	13	22	46	69	−23	46	Reinstated
23	Avellino (R)	46	8	13	25	51	69	−18	37	Relegation to Serie C1
24	Como (R)	46	7	12	27	34	71	−37	33	Relegation to Serie C1

Source: Almanacco Illustrato del Calcio - La Storia 1898-2004, Panini Edizioni, Modena, September 2005
Rules for classification: 1) points; 2) head-to-head points; 3) head-to-head goal difference; 4) head-to-head goals scored; 5) goal difference; 6) number of goals scored.
(C) Champions; (E) Eliminated; (P) Promoted; (R) Relegated; (T) Qualified, but not yet for the particular phase indicated

== Results ==
Home \ Away	ALB	ASC	ATA	AVE	BAR	CAG	CTN	COM	FIO	GEN	LIV	MES	NAP	PAL	PES	PIA	SAL	TER	TOR	TRV	TRI	VEN	HEL	VIC
AlbinoLeffe	—	3–3	0–4	1–0	3–1	0–0	1–1	2–1	1–0	0–0	1–1	0–0	1–0	1–1	1–0	0–0	0–1	1–2	2–2	1–0	0–0	0–0	2–0	2–1
Ascoli	2–1	—	1–1	0–1	1–1	3–1	1–0	4–0	0–1	0–1	2–1	1–1	1–2	2–1	0–0	0–0	3–2	0–0	2–2	1–3	2–1	1–0	3–0	3–1
Atalanta	2–1	2–0	—	2–0	2–0	2–1	3–0	2–1	1–1	1–0	0–0	2–2	0–0	0–0	1–0	0–1	0–0	1–1	1–1	2–2	4–1	0–0	0–2	3–2
Avellino	0–3	2–2	1–1	—	1–2	2–3	0–0	0–0	0–1	2–1	1–1	0–1	3–0	0–0	3–2	1–3	2–1	0–2	1–3	2–3	1–0	1–0	6–0	0–1
Bari	0–1	1–2	2–1	2–1	—	0–0	1–2	1–0	0–0	1–0	3–2	1–3	0–0	2–1	2–2	2–1	3–0	1–2	2–1	0–0	4–1	1–2	1–2	2–1
Cagliari	1–0	3–0	5–1	3–1	2–1	—	2–1	3–2	3–1	2–0	4–1	1–1	1–1	3–2	3–0	0–2	3–1	3–0	0–0	1–1	3–1	2–2	1–1	0–0
Catania	2–1	1–1	1–1	2–0	1–0	0–3	—	0–0	1–1	1–0	0–3	1–0	1–0	0–2	2–0	3–0	2–0	1–1	2–0	1–0	0–1	3–0	1–1	1–1
Como	1–1	2–1	0–3	0–3	1–3	1–3	1–4	—	0–2	1–3	3–5	1–1	2–0	0–1	1–1	2–2	1–0	0–2	0–2	2–1	0–0	1–1	0–2	0–1
Fiorentina	2–1	0–0	1–1	3–1	3–1	2–1	3–2	1–0	—	2–2	1–1	2–0	2–1	2–1	1–1	2–1	1–0	1–0	1–0	2–0	1–1	1–1	1–0	1–1
Genoa	4–2	1–1	0–3	1–1	2–0	4–2	1–3	0–1	2–1	—	0–1	2–2	2–2	1–1	1–1	1–1	1–2	4–1	2–1	0–0	2–2	1–0	4–1	2–0
Livorno	3–0	1–0	0–0	0–0	1–1	1–1	2–2	2–1	2–0	1–1	—	3–0	3–0	1–1	5–1	2–0	2–0	1–0	3–1	2–0	1–1	0–0	3–0	1–2
Messina	4–1	2–1	3–0	3–2	1–0	2–2	3–0	3–0	3–0	4–0	2–1	—	1–1	1–1	2–2	2–0	2–0	1–1	1–1	3–1	1–1	2–1	1–0	1–1
Napoli	0–0	1–1	0–0	1–0	0–0	1–0	2–3	0–1	2–2	0–0	0–0	1–0	—	1–1	1–0	1–1	0–0	2–1	2–2	1–0	0–0	1–1	2–2	1–1
Palermo	2–1	1–0	0–0	1–1	3–0	1–0	5–0	2–1	2–0	3–1	4–1	0–0	4–0	—	2–1	1–1	0–2	2–1	2–1	2–3	3–1	4–0	3–1	3–0
Pescara	4–3	2–1	0–0	1–0	2–0	0–1	1–0	1–1	0–0	1–2	0–0	1–2	1–2	0–2	—	1–0	2–2	2–2	2–1	1–2	1–0	1–0	2–1	0–0
Piacenza	0–0	1–1	0–0	2–0	1–0	1–2	0–0	1–1	2–0	4–4	1–3	1–0	2–3	2–2	2–1	—	1–0	2–1	2–0	2–0	1–0	1–0	3–1	1–0
Salernitana	0–3	0–0	1–3	1–0	2–0	3–2	1–2	1–0	1–0	0–1	0–2	0–3	0–0	1–1	1–2	0–0	—	2–1	2–0	0–0	2–2	2–0	1–1	0–0
Ternana	0–0	1–1	2–1	2–2	0–0	1–1	3–1	0–0	3–2	1–0	1–2	3–0	0–0	1–1	3–0	2–0	1–2	—	0–0	3–2	1–0	5–2	2–0	1–0
Torino	4–0	3–1	0–1	2–2	3–2	4–2	1–0	1–0	1–1	1–0	1–1	1–3	1–2	2–1	2–0	4–2	0–1	2–1	—	2–1	1–1	0–0	1–1	1–1
Treviso	2–1	3–1	0–3	2–1	1–1	0–0	2–1	2–0	0–0	1–0	1–1	1–2	0–1	1–1	3–0	1–1	4–0	1–1	0–0	—	2–1	1–1	0–2	1–1
Triestina	3–0	1–1	1–1	2–1	1–0	1–2	0–0	2–2	2–1	2–1	4–3	1–1	0–0	1–0	2–1	0–0	2–1	1–1	1–0	1–0	—	1–0	2–2	0–1
Venezia	2–1	1–0	1–0	2–1	3–2	1–2	0–3	3–1	0–2	2–2	3–2	2–0	0–0	1–1	2–0	0–0	0–1	0–1	2–1	0–0	1–0	—	0–2	1–1
Hellas Verona	2–3	0–1	1–2	2–2	4–3	1–2	0–0	1–0	0–1	3–0	1–1	0–0	1–1	1–2	4–3	3–0	0–0	3–2	0–0	0–0	0–1	1–0	—	2–3
Vicenza	1–0	2–3	0–1	2–2	1–1	2–0	2–0	0–1	1–1	0–0	2–2	2–1	1–0	0–0	1–1	0–1	3–1	1–2	2–2	1–1	1–1	3–1	1–2	—

Source: Almanacco Illustrato del Calcio - La Storia 1898-2004, Panini Edizioni, Modena, September 2005
Legend: Blue = home team win; Yellow = draw; Red = away team win.

== Promotion play-offs ==
Fiorentina had to play a qualification match with 15th-placed team of Serie A, Perugia.

16 June 2004
20:30 CEST

Perugia	0–1	Fiorentina
		Fantini 10'

Stadio Renato Curi, Perugia
Attendance: 23,500
Referee: Matteo Trefoloni

20 June 2004
20:30 CEST

Fiorentina	1–1	Perugia
Fantini 47'		do Prado 82'

Stadio Artemio Franchi, Florence
Attendance: 43,000
Referee: Roberto Rosetti

A.C. Perugia relegated to Serie B, while ACF Fiorentina was promoted to Serie A.

== Relegation play-off* ==
16 June 2004
20:30 CEST

Bari	1–0	Venezia
Bruno 57'

Stadio San Nicola, Bari
Attendance: 22,583
Referee: Pasquale Rodomonti

19 June 2004
20:30 CEST

Venezia	2–0	Bari
Brellier 50'; Biancolino 90+4'

Stadio Pier Luigi Penzo, Venice
Attendance: 4,846
Referee: Stefano Farina

A.S. Bari was relegated but was later readmitted in place of S.S.C. Napoli.

== Top scorers ==
1. Luca Toni, Palermo: 30

== Attendances ==
#	Club	Average
1	Fiorentina	25,887
2	Palermo	23,559
3	Genoa	17,347
4	Napoli	14,603
5	Cagliari	12,111
6	Atalanta	11,680
7	Hellas	10,667
8	Livorno	10,643
9	Salernitana	10,469
10	Catania	10,171
11	Messina	10,162
12	Torino	9,831
13	Ternana	8,645
14	Avellino	8,348
15	Triestina	7,905
16	Vicenza	7,170
17	Bari	6,620
18	Ascoli	5,962
19	Piacenza	5,239
20	Pescara	4,786
21	Treviso	3,421
22	Como	2,834
23	Venezia	2,790
24	AlbinoLeffe	2,458
