= Gianluca Berti =

Italian footballer

Personal information
- Date of birth: 20 May 1967 (age 59)
- Place of birth: Florence, Italy
- Height: 1.89 m (6 ft 2 in)
- Position: Goalkeeper

Youth career
- 1985–1986: AC Prato

Senior career*
Years	Team	Apps	(Gls)
1986–1990	Prato	11	(0)
1990–1991	Olbia	34	(0)
1991–1992	Genoa	6	(0)
1992–1993	Pisa	34	(0)
1993–1994	Genoa	15	(0)
1994–1995	Ancona	28	(0)
1995–1996	Palermo	36	(0)
1996	Genoa	5	(0)
1997	Roma	3	(0)
1997–1998	Reggiana	25	(0)
1998–1999	Ravenna	34	(0)
1999–2003	Empoli	133	(0)
2003–2004	Palermo	42	(0)
2004	Parma	1	(0)
2005	Torino	0	(0)
2005	Empoli	19	(0)
2006	Fiorentina	1	(0)
2006–2007	Sampdoria	11	(0)
2007	Cesena	12	(0)
2008–2009	Novara	9	(0)
Total		459	(0)
- * Club domestic league appearances and goals

Gianluca Berti (born 20 May 1967) is an Italian former professional footballer who played as a goalkeeper.

== Football career ==
Berti was born in Florence. He started playing professionally with Prato, in the third division, representing Olbia in the same level, in 1990–91.

From 1991 to 2007, he alternated between the Serie A and B, with Genoa, Pisa, Ancona, Palermo (playing 42 matches in the Sicilians' 2004 top flight promotion), Roma, Reggiana, Ravenna, Empoli, Parma, Torino, Fiorentina, Sampdoria and Cesena.

In June 1998, Gianluca Berti was transferred to Perugia, in exchange for Stefano Guidoni; but, in July, he left for Ravenna.

Aged 41, after still managing 11 first division appearances for Sampdoria, in 2006–07, Berti re-joined the third level in 2008, moving to Novara, in the Serie C1/Lega Pro Prima Divisione.

He left professional football in 2009, joining Eccellenza Tuscany side Jolly & Montemurlo.

== Honours ==
Palermo

- Serie B: 2003–04
