= Danilo Di Vincenzo =

Italian footballer (1968-1996)

Personal information
- Date of birth: 18 April 1968
- Place of birth: Rome, Italy
- Date of death: 10 December 1996 (aged 28)
- Place of death: Orvieto, Italy
- Position: Striker

Senior career*
Years	Team	Apps	(Gls)
- Cosenza
- Castel di Sangro
- Giulianova
- * Club domestic league appearances and goals

Danilo Di Vincenzo (18 April 1968 in Rome – 10 December 1996 in Orvieto) was an Italian footballer. He played as a striker. He played in Serie B with Cosenza and A.S.D. Castel di Sangro Calcio and in Serie C with various other teams, in particular Giulianova. He died on the morning of 10 December 1996 in a car accident alongside Castel di Sangro teammate Pippo Biondi.

== Career ==
- 1994 Giulianova ? (30)
- 1996 Castel di Sangro 9 (3)
