= Giovanni Serrapica (footballer) =

Italian footballer

Personal information
- Date of birth: 18 May 1981 (age 45)
- Place of birth: Pompei, Italy
- Height: 1.75 m (5 ft 9 in)
- Position: Midfielder

Youth career
- Parma

Senior career*
Years	Team	Apps	(Gls)
2000–2005	Prato	111	(1)
2004	→ AlbinoLeffe (loan)	8	(0)
2005	Sassuolo	15	(0)
2005–2006	Pro Vercelli	31	(1)
2006–2007	Paganese	31	(1)
2007–2008	Pizzighettone	31	(1)
2008	Neapolis	9	(0)
2008–2010	Nocerina	35	(0)
2010–2011	Civitanovese	23	(0)
2011	Battipagliese	13	(0)
2011–2012	Noto	15	(0)
2012	Pro Cavese		
2012–2016	Sant'Agnello		
2016–2017	Sorrento		
2017–2018	Sant'Agnello		
- * Club domestic league appearances and goals

Giovanni Serrapica (born 18 May 1981) is an Italian former footballer.

== Biography ==
=== Prato ===
Born in Pompei, the Province of Naples, Campania, he had played for Emilia club Parma in youth levels. He played for Parma Allievi U17 team in 1997. He left for Prato along with Gabriele Giaroli in co-ownership deal for a total fee of 70 million lire (€36,152) in summer 2000. He played 33 out of possible 34 games of 2000–01 Serie C2. In June 2001 the co-ownership of Serrapica was renewed and Giaroli was bought back for undisclosed fee. Prato also got Davide Stirpe (35 million lire; €18,076) in a new co-ownership deal. In the next season he only played 24 games and suspended once, due to his fourth caution; he was warned 5 times in total that season. The team won promotion to Italian third division in May 2002. The co-ownership of Serrapica was renewed again in June 2002 and bought back Stirpe for undisclosed fee. However, he was later sold to Empoli from Parma for undisclosed fee as part of the signing of Mark Bresciano (100%) and Marco Marchionni (residual 50%). In 2002–03 Serie C1 Serrapica was cautioned 6 times and suspended once (round 16). In June 2003 Empoli gave up the remain 50% registration rights to Prato. Serrapica played 11 games in 2003–04 Serie C1 before left on loan to AlbinoLeffe of Serie B. He made his Serie B debut on 8 February 2004, a 0–0 draw with Ternana Calcio. In June 2004 the Lombard club did not bought Serrapica, thus he returned to Tuscany for Prato. Serrapica played half season for Prato in 2004–05 Serie C1 and signed by Emilia club Sassuolo in January 2005, re-joining Giaroli. He served once game suspension with Sassuolo in round 22. Serrapica left the club again in summer 2005.

=== Serie C2 clubs ===
In summer 2005 he was signed by Pro Vercelli, however he missed 3 games also due to suspension (round 12, 21 (rescheduled to 15 February), 24 (rescheduled to 4 March)). In the next two seasons he played for Paganese and Pizzighettone respectively, both as regular starter. He was suspended in the first match of 2006–07 Coppa Italia Lega Pro and twice in 2007–08 Serie C2. In summer 2008 he briefly returned to home province for Serie D club Neapolis (of Group I). In November 2008 he was signed by another Campania team Nocerina of Serie D Group H. The club finished as the second of the group and entered the promotion playoffs. Nocerina eventually won the promotion back to fully professional league of Italy, Lega Pro Seconda Divisione (ex- Serie C2) – the fourth division. In 2009–10 Lega Pro Seconda Divisione season, even though Serrapica remained in the squad, he only played 15 times. He was suspended once in the cup and twice in the league. The team finished narrowly survived from relegation zone for only 1 point, but accepted invitation to 2010–11 Lega Pro Prima Divisione to fill the vacancies by bankrupted teams. While Serrapica was released.

=== Non-professional clubs ===
Since 2010 he played for Civitanovese, Battipagliese, Noto and Pro Cavese in Serie D. He was cautioned 6 times in 2010–11 Serie D and once in 2011–12 Serie D.

In December 2012 he left for Eccellenza Campania club Sant'Agnello. In March 2013, he applied for youth coaching course.

In 2016, Serrapica signed for Eccellenza Campania team Sorrento, after they were refounded following their bankruptcy and temporary expulsion from Italian league football.

== Honours ==
- Serie C2: 2002 (Prato)
