= Marco Fortin =

Italian football goalkeeper

Personal information
- Date of birth: 8 July 1974 (age 52)
- Place of birth: Noale, Italy
- Height: 6 ft 1 in (1.85 m)
- Position: Goalkeeper

Team information
- Current team: Calvi Noale

Youth career
- 1993–1995: Internazionale

Senior career*
Years	Team	Apps	(Gls)
1995–1996	Pro Sesto	17	(0)
1996–1997	Torres	26	(0)
1997–1999	Giorgione	67	(0)
1999–2003	Treviso	56	(0)
2002–2006	Siena	88	(0)
2006–2007	Cagliari	29	(0)
2008–2010	Vicenza	88	(0)
2010–2012	AEK Larnaca	15	(0)
Total		360	(0)
- * Club domestic league appearances and goals

Marco Fortin (born 8 July 1974) is an Italian former football goalkeeper. During his playing career, Fortin frequently wore the number 14 shirt, as the pronunciation of his surname sounded similar to the number fourteen in English.

== Career ==
=== Early career ===
Fortin began his career in the youth academy of Internazionale. Fortin made his professional debut with Serie C Pro Sesto and spent his first 7 seasons of his career in the lower divisions of Italian football.

=== Siena ===
Fortin joined Siena in July 2002. In his first season, he served as the first choice goalkeeper for the Serie B runners-up, as they won promotion to the Italian top division. In his second season with Siena, and his first Serie A season, he lost his place in the starting line-up to Generoso Rossi. In the 2004–05 season, both Fortin and Alex Manninger shared the role of the club's first choice keeper. In the next season, he became Antonio Mirante's backup. In July 2006, he joined Cagliari and worked as Antonio Chimenti's backup. In 2007–08 season he was the first choice goalkeeper ahead Jan Koprivec and Vincenzo Marruocco. In December 2007 he lost his place to Marruocco, and in January 2008 the club signed Marco Storari. Fortin and Marruocco left the club in late January.

=== Cagliari ===
Fortin spent two seasons with Cagliari after leaving Siena following the end of the 2005-2006 season, largely serving as a backup behind Antonio Chimenti.

=== Vicenza ===
Fortin joined Vicenza in the winter transfer window of the 2007-2008 season. He spent three seasons with Vicenza in Serie B as the starting goalkeeper, making a total of 88 appearances over two and a half seasons.

=== AEK Larnaca ===
On September 4 2010, Fortin joined AEK Larnaca in the Cypriot First Division. Fortin made 15 appearances over two seasons.

== Personal life ==
Fortin's son, Mattia Fortin, is also a professional football goalkeeper currently playing for Palermo, on loan from Lens. Following the footsteps of his father, Mattia often uses the number 14 shirt.

== Career statistics ==
Appearances and goals by club, season and competition
Club	Season	League			National Cup		Europe		Other		Total	
Club	Season	Division	Apps	Goals	Apps	Goals	Apps	Goals	Apps	Goals	Apps	Goals
Pro Sesto	1995–96	Serie C1	17	0	—		—		0	0	17	0
Torres	1996–97	Serie C2	26	0	—		—		—		26	0
Giorgione	1997–98	Serie C2	34	0	—		—		2	0	36	0
Giorgione	1998–99	Serie C2	33	0	—		—		—		33	0
Giorgione	Total		67	0	—		—		2	0	69	0
Treviso	1999–2000	Serie B	11	0	4	0	—		—		36	2
Treviso	2000–01	Serie B	12	0	2	0	—		—		14	0
Treviso	2001–02	Serie C1	33	0	2	0	—		2	0	37	0
Treviso	Total		56	0	8	0	—		2	0	66	0
Siena	2002–03	Serie B	36	0	3	0	—		—		39	0
Siena	2003–04	Serie A	13	0	4	0	—		—		17	0
Siena	2004–05	Serie A	19	0	1	0	—		—		20	0
Siena	2005–06	Serie A	12	0	0	0	—		—		12	0
Siena	Total		88	0	8	0	—		—		96	0
Cagliari	2006–07	Serie A	17	0	0	0	—		—		17	0
Cagliari	2007–08	Serie A	12	0	1	0	—		—		13	0
Cagliari	Total		29	0	1	0	—		—		30	0
Vicenza	2007–08	Serie B	18	0	—		—		—		18	0
Vicenza	2008–09	Serie B	35	0	2	0	—		—		37	0
Vicenza	2009–10	Serie B	35	0	1	0	—		—		36	0
Vicenza	Total		88	0	3	0	—		—		91	0
AEK Larnaca	2010–11	Cypriot First Division	5	0	0	0	—		—		5	0
AEK Larnaca	2011–12	Cypriot First Division	10	0	0	0	7	0	—		17	0
AEK Larnaca	Total		15	0	0	0	7	0	—		22	0
Career total			360	0	20	0	7	0	4	0	391	0
