= Stefano Guidoni =

Italian footballer

Personal information
- Date of birth: 27 October 1971 (age 55)
- Place of birth: Turin, Italy
- Height: 1.84 m (6 ft 0 in)
- Position: Forward

Senior career*
Years	Team	Apps	(Gls)
1990–1992	Giaveno	62	(17)
1992–1993	Sparta Novara	24	(11)
1993–1994	Solbiatese	25	(9)
1994–1996	Monza	56	(26)
1996	Avellino	11	(4)
1996–1997	Cosenza	25	(10)
1997–1999	Perugia	37	(4)
1998	→ Reggiana (co-ownership)	7	(3)
1998–1999	→ Verona (co-ownership)	26	(8)
1999–2001	Salernitana	50	(13)
2001	→ Cosenza (loan)	17	(5)
2001–2002	Palermo	32	(11)
2002–2003	Cosenza	35	(8)
2003–2005	Venezia	49	(8)
2006	Cremonese	6	(0)
2006–2007	Ivrea	25	(2)
Total		487	(139)
- * Club domestic league appearances and goals

Stefano Guidoni (born 27 October 1971) is an Italian former footballer who played as a forward.

== Career ==
=== Early career ===
Born in Turin, Piedmont, Guidoni started his senior career at Serie D side Giaveno and Sparta Novara, both located in Piedmont. In 1993–94 season, he left for Lombardy side Solbiatese and played one season at Serie C2. After played 10 league matches in 1994–95 Serie C2 season, he was signed by Serie C1 side Monza. He played 56 league matches for the Lombardy side before left for Campania side Avellino in 1996–97 Serie C1. In December 1996, he was signed by Serie B side Cosenza, played 25 league matches and scored 10 goals for the southern Italy club.

=== Perugia ===
As Cosenza's financial crisis, he was transferred to Umbria side Perugia in June 1997, the last few days of the 1996–97 fiscal year, for 850 million Italian lire. He just scored 4 goals for the team that won Serie A promotion.

Guidoni left for Serie B side Reggiana in co-ownership deal in June 1998, in exchange with Gianluca Berti. But in October he was signed by Verona along with Antonio Marasco (priced Guidoni 2 billion Italian lire, purchased the 50% rights from Reggiana) He won Serie B champion with the Veneto club. In June 1999, he was bought back by Perugia.

He made his Serie A debut on 29 August 1999, the opening match of the season. He was in the starting XI and was replaced by Pierpaolo Bisoli in the 68th minutes. Perugia 1–1 draw with Parma in that match. He played his 2nd league match of the season in round 3, substituted Alessandro Melli (who scored the 3rd goal). The match Perugia won Cagliari 3–0.

=== Salernitana ===
On 1 October 1999, he was sold to Serie B side Salernitana for 2.5 billion lire. After just scored 2 goals in Serie B, in January 2001, he was loaned to Serie B rival Cosenza.

=== Palermo & Cosenza ===
In July 2001, Guidoni requested the court to void the contract with Salernitana after the club owe him salary, and he had already signed a pre-contract with Palermo. With the Sicily side, he scored 11 league goals, tied his personal record in a single Serie B season. After Maurizio Zamparini purchased Palermo in July 2002 and bought some of the players from Venezia he previous own, Guidoni became a surplus and on 13 September left for Cosenza again.

=== Venezia & late career ===
After the bankruptcy of Cosenza, he joined Serie B side Venezia but the club also went bankrupt in 2005. In February 2006, he was signed by Serie B side Cremonese and in 2006–07 season he was acquired by Ivrea.

== Honours ==
Verona

- Serie B: 1998–99
