= 2003–04 Serie C1 =

Italian football league season

The 2003–04 Serie C1 was the twenty-sixth edition of Serie C1, the third highest league in the Italian football league system.

== League standings ==
=== Serie C1/A ===
Pos	Team	Pld	W	D	L	GF	GA	GD	Pts
1	AC Arezzo	34	20	7	7	51	27	+24	67
2	AC Lumezzane	34	17	8	9	42	33	+9	59
3	AC Cesena	34	15	13	6	47	34	+13	58
4	AC Rimini 1912	34	14	11	9	42	33	+9	53
5	AS Lucchese	34	14	10	10	39	34	+5	52
6	Spezia Calcio	34	13	12	9	35	33	+2	51
7	Calcio Padova	34	13	10	11	44	37	+7	49
8	Pisa Calcio	34	12	12	10	35	27	+8	48
9	SPAL	34	12	11	11	31	28	+3	47
10	AC Pistoiese	34	11	11	12	35	36	−1	44
11	AS Cittadella	34	11	9	14	34	35	−1	42
12	Novara Calcio	34	9	13	12	37	41	−4	40
13	Sassari Torres 1903	34	9	11	14	21	28	−7	38
14	Pro Patria	34	9	11	14	28	38	−10	38
15	AC Reggiana 1919	34	9	10	15	32	45	−13	37
16	AS Varese 1910	34	8	11	15	29	43	−14	35
17	AC Prato	34	8	10	16	33	46	−13	34
18	AC Pavia	34	8	8	18	29	47	−18	32

==== Play-off ====
===== Semifinal =====
Location and Date	Team 1	Score	Team 2
Lucca, 31 May 2004	Lucchese	3–4	Lumezzane
Lumezzane, 6 June 2004	Lumezzane	2–0	Lucchese
Rimini, 31 May 2004	Rimini	1–1	Cesena
Cesena, 6 June 2004	Cesena	2–0	Rimini

===== Final =====
Location and Date	Team 1	Score	Team 2
Cesena, 13 June 2004	Cesena	1–1	Calcio Lumezzane
Lumezzane, 20 June 2004	Lumezzane	1–2 (a.e.t.)	Cesena

==== Play-out ====
Location and Date	Team 1	Score	Team 2
Prato, May 31, 2004	Prato	0–0	Pro Patria
Busto Arsizio, June 6, 2004	Pro Patria	3–2	Prato
Varese, May 31, 2004	Varese	0–1	Reggiana
Reggio Emilia, June 6, 2005	Reggiana	1–1	Varese

==== Final Verdict ====
Arezzo and Cesena promoted to Serie B

Varese, Pavia and Prato relegated to Serie C2

Repechage : Pavia and Prato admitted at Serie C1 2004–05

=== Serie C1/B ===
Pos	Team	Pld	W	D	L	GF	GA	GD	Pts
1	FC Catanzaro	34	19	10	5	44	25	+19	67
2	FC Crotone	34	19	8	7	57	33	+24	65
3	AS Viterbese Calcio	34	16	13	5	45	29	+16	61
4	AS Acireale	34	16	12	6	40	26	+14	60
5	Benevento Calcio	34	14	14	6	41	28	+13	56
6	SS Lanciano	34	15	8	11	34	31	+3	53
7	SS Sambenedettese	34	13	13	8	50	40	+10	52
8	SS Chieti Calcio	34	13	9	12	39	35	+4	48
9	US Foggia	34	11	13	10	43	43	0	46
10	Teramo Calcio	34	13	6	15	40	41	−1	45
11	Giulianova Calcio	34	11	8	15	35	39	−4	41
12	AC Martina	34	11	9	14	45	50	−5	41 (Note: 1 point deducted)
13	AS Sora	34	10	11	13	27	35	−8	41
14	US Fermana	34	9	13	12	34	46	−12	40
15	Vis Pesaro dal 1898	34	9	9	16	31	48	−17	36
16	AC Paternò 2004	34	8	8	18	32	47	−15	32
17	AS Taranto Calcio	34	7	9	18	31	46	−15	30
18	L'Aquila Calcio 1927	34	2	7	25	26	52	−26	13

==== Play-off ====
===== Semifinal =====
Location and Date	Team 1	Score	Team 2
Benevento, May 31, 2004	Benevento	1–0	Crotone
Crotone, June 6, 2004	Crotone	3–1	Benevento
Acireale, May 31, 2004	Acireale	1–2	Viterbese
Viterbo, June 6, 2004	Viterbese	1–0	Acireale

===== Final =====
Location and Date	Team 1	Score	Team 2
Naples, June 13, 2004	Viterbese	0–0	Crotone
Crotone, June 20, 2004	Crotone	3–0	Viterbese

==== Play-out ====
Location and Date	Team 1	Score	Team 2
Paternò, May 31, 2004	Paternò	0–0	Vis Pesaro
Pesaro, June 6, 2004	Vis Pesaro	2–1	Paternò
Taranto, May 31, 2004	Taranto	1–1	Fermana
Fermo, June 6, 2004	Fermana	0–0	Taranto

==== Final Verdict ====
Catanzaro and Crotone promoted to Serie B

L'Aquila, Paternò, Taranto and Viterbese relegated to Serie C2

=== Team failed ===
Varese, L'Aquila, Paternò, Viterbese
