= Luca Capecchi =

Italian footballer

Personal information
- Date of birth: 4 August 1974 (age 52)
- Place of birth: Imola, Italy
- Height: 6 ft 3 in (1.91 m)
- Position: Goalkeeper

Senior career*
Years	Team	Apps	(Gls)
1993–1997	Baracca Lugo	50	(0)
1997–2002	A.S. Cittadella	81	(0)
2002–2003	Pisa Calcio	31	(0)
2003–2004	A.S. Sora	18	(0)
2004–2008	Ravenna Calcio	128	(0)
2008	→ Cagliari Calcio (loan)	1	(0)
2008–2012	SPAL 1907	43	(0)
2012–2014	Fondi Calcio	8	(0)
- * Club domestic league appearances and goals

Luca Capecchi (born 4 August 1974) is an Italian former footballer who played as a goalkeeper.

Capecchi has played for Baracca Lugo, A.S. Cittadella, Pisa Calcio, A.S. Sora and Ravenna Calcio. In January 2008, he joined Cagliari Calcio on loan until June.
