= Vincenzo Marruocco =

Italian footballer

Personal information
- Date of birth: 26 March 1979 (age 47)
- Place of birth: Naples, Italy
- Height: 1.80 m (5 ft 11 in)
- Position: Goalkeeper

Youth career
- Cascina

Senior career*
Years	Team	Apps	(Gls)
1997–1998	Giugliano	23	(1)
1998	Ischia	0	(0)
1998–1999	Lecce	0	(0)
1999–2002	Messina	24	(0)
2002–2003	Salernitana	13	(0)
2003–2004	Chieti	13	(0)
2003–2004	Messina	0	(0)
2004–2007	Foggia	61	(1)
2007–2008	Cagliari	5	(0)
2008	→ Ravenna (loan)	17	(0)
2008–2009	Cavese	28	(0)
2009–2010	Manfredonia	20	(0)
2010–2011	Avellino	23	(0)
2011–2012	Nissa	6	(0)
2012–2013	Paganese	20	(0)
2014–2017	Paganese	82	(0)
2017–2018	Cavese	6	(0)

Managerial career
- 2019–2020: Manfredonia (GK coach)
- 2020: Messina (GK coach)
- 2020: Arezzo (assistant)
- * Club domestic league appearances and goals

Vincenzo Marruocco (born 26 March 1979) is an Italian football coach and a former goalkeeper.

== Playing career ==
Marruocco played at Serie A level with Cagliari.

In January 2008 he was exchanged with Luca Capecchi. On 1 September 2008, his contract with Cagliari was terminated.
