= Article 52 of NOIF =

Italian football regulations

Art.52, Norme organizzative interne della FIGC ("Article 52 of the Italian Football Federation regulations for internal organisation") governs the status of phoenix clubs of football in Italy. The article was revised in 2004, 2008, 2010, and 2014. Many Commas, or paragraphs, are present throughout the document. Comma 1 describes the article's main points, while Comma 2 forbids to sell a club sport's rights.

== Comma 3 and 4 ==
According to Comma 3, a new company may replace a bankrupt football club from the same city. With this acquisition, the new company has to take over the liabilities to pay any costs, as well as any outstanding taxes.

=== Examples ===
==== Serie B ====
- F.C. Bari 1908: (2014)

==== Serie C ====
- Ascoli Picchio F.C. 1898: (2014)
- Carrarese Calcio 1908: (2016)
- U.S. Foggia: (2004)
- S.S. Virtus Lanciano 1924: (2008)
- A.C. Monza Brianza 1912: (2004)
- Delfino Pescara 1936: (2009)
- Aurora Pro Patria 1919: (2009)
- S.S. Sambenedettese Calcio: (2006)
- Savona F.B.C.: (2012)

Comma 4 is similar to Comma 3 in semiprofessional and amatorial leagues.

==== Serie D ====
- A.R.L.S.S.D. Atletico San Paolo Padova: (2014)
- A.S.D. Città di Foligno 1928: (2015)
- U.S. Imperia 1923: (2000)
- A.C.R. Messina: (2009)
- S.S.D. Vivi Altotevere Sansepolcro: (2014)

==== Eccellenza ====
- S.S.D. Massese: (2009)
- Fulgor Maceratese: (2009)
- F.C. Sezze Latina: (2003)

==== Promozione ====
- A.C. Cesenatico: (2000)
- A.C. Trento S.C.S.D.: (2014)
- A.S.D. Amici del Verbania: (2006)

== Comma 5 ==
Comma 5 allows the merging of two or more clubs. The new team follows the sport rights of any one of the two clubs that is considered to be more convenient. It is one of the oldest FIGC rules, and one team who applied this rule was UC Sampdoria (1946), which inherited and continued the history of its forerunner, SG Sampierdarenese, in Serie A.

== Commas 6 through 9 (Lodo Petrucci) ==
Lodo Petrucci (Petrucci Award) was a ruling named after Gianni Petrucci. Ratified in 2004, instead of acquiring the sports title by clearing the debt, FIGC awards the title to a new company based on the historic sporting merit of an old club. However, in such a situation, the new club was automatically relegated to one level below the original club. In 2008, this changed to an automatic relegation two levels below the original club, and was limited to Serie A and B clubs only. However, the ruling was repealed in 2015, as its criteria were too subjective.

=== Examples ===
Serie A → Serie B

- Società Civile Campo Torino: (2005)

Serie B → Serie C1

- Perugia Calcio: (2005)
- Salernitana Calcio 1919: (2005)

Serie C1 → Serie C2

- A.S. Andria BAT: (2005)
- Benevento Calcio: (2005)
- Reggio Emilia F.C.: (2005)
- SPAL 1907: (2005)
- S.S.C. Venezia: (2005)

Some clubs unsuccessfully tried the Lodo Petrucci, so they had to pay part of the old debts to create the new phoenix club. These cases were privately managed by the FIGC without specific rules as the ACF Fiorentina case in 2002:

- Napoli: (2004)
- A.C. Ancona: (2004)

== Comma 10 ==
Comma 10 of the article allowed a new company to be admitted to Serie D in order to replace the old football club that was not admitted to professional leagues. Formerly Comma 9, it was changed to Comma 10 in the 2010 amendment. One example was the failed auction of Parma F.C., which was in debt with €22.6 million (reduced from €70 million by the resettlement during administration).

=== Examples ===
City	Team	Year	Ref.
Serie D
Arezzo	A.S.D. Atletico Arezzo	2010	
Avellino	Avellino Calcio.12 S.S.D.	2009	
Avellino	U.S. Avellino 1912	2018	
Bari	S.S.C. Bari	2018	
Como	Calcio Como	2005	
Como	Como 1907	2017	
Ferrara	Real SPAL	2012	
Foggia	A.C.D. Foggia Calcio	2012	
Foggia	Calcio Foggia 1920	2019	
Grosseto	F.C. Grosseto S.S.D.	2015	
Latina		2017	
Livorno	U.S. Livorno	2021	
Mantua	Mantova F.C.	2010	
Mantua		2017	
Messina	A.C. Rinascita Messina	2008	
Messina		2017	
Modena	Modena Football Club	2018	
Monza	S.S.D. Monza 1912	2015	
Novara	Novara Football Club	2021	
Padua	S.S.D. Biancoscudati Padova	2014	
Palermo	Palermo Football Club	2019	
Parma	S.S.D. Parma Calcio 1913	2015	
Perugia	A.S.D. Perugia Calcio S.r.l.	2010	
Pisa	A.C. Pisa 1909	2009	
Reggio Calabria	A.S.D. Reggio Calabria	2015	
Reggio Calabria	LFA Reggio Calabria	2023	
Reggio Emilia	Reggio Audace F.C.	2018	
Rimini	A.C. Rimini 1912 S.S.D. a r.l.	2010	
Salerno	Salerno Calcio	2011	
Siena	Robur Siena S.S.D.	2014	
Spezia	Spezia Calcio	2008	
Trieste	US Triestina Calcio	1994	
Venice	F.B.C. Unione Venezia	2009	
Venice	Venezia Football Club	2015	
Eccellenza
Alessandria	U.S. Alessandria Calcio 1912	2003	
Barletta	A.S.D. Barletta 1922	2015	
Ferrara	Ars et Labor Ferrara Calcio	2025	
Imola	Imolese	2005	
Manfredonia	A.S.D. Manfredonia Football 1932	2010	
Mantua	Mantova Calcio 1994	1994	
Olbia	A.S.D. Olbia 1905	2010	
Siena	Siena Football Club	2023	
Sora	Sora	2005	
Trieste	Unione Triestina 2012 S.S.D.	2012	
Varese	Varese Calcio S.S.D.	2015	
Promozione
Chieti	A.S.D. Chieti	2006	
Cassino	A.S.D. Nuova Cassino Calcio 1924	2010	
Gallipoli	Gallipoli Football 1909	2010	
