= ACD Castel di Sangro Cep 1953 =

Italian football club

A.C.D. Castel di Sangro Cep 1953
- Full name: Associazione Calcistica Dilettantistica; Castel di Sangro Cep 1953
- Nicknames: Giallorossi (Yellow-reds), Sangrini, Castello (Castle), Castelsangro
- Founded: 1953; 2005 (refounded); 2012 (refounded)
- Ground: Stadio Teofilo Patini, Castel di Sangro, Italy
- Capacity: 7,220
- Chairman: Giuseppe Santostefano
- Manager: Domenico Cristiano
- League: Eccellenza Molise
- 2020–21: Eccellenza Molise, 7th
Home colours	Away colours

Castel di Sangro Cep is an Italian association football club from Castel di Sangro in the Province of L'Aquila, Abruzzo. They currently play in Eccellenza Molise.

Their moment of greatness came in 1996, when they were promoted to Serie B, a noteworthy accomplishment for a team coming from a town of only 5,500 residents. Even greater, they were able to survive in that league another year. The story of their first season in Serie B is chronicled in the book The Miracle of Castel di Sangro by Joe McGinniss. The team played at the 7,220 seat Stadio Teofilo Patini in Castel di Sangro. The team's colours are red and yellow.

== History ==
=== Beginnings ===
The village of Castel di Sangro had suffered great damage during the Second World War. At the end of the war, a priest named Don Arbete organized a football team to help to rebuild the community. Materials were scarce, so the players used a ball of socks tied with twine. They won their first match against a neighboring town, thus setting the bar high as far as expectations went. A formal team was organized by 1953, joining the lowest of all leagues in Italy, Terza Categoria (third category).

It took the team thirty years to earn a promotion to Seconda Categoria, doing so in 1983. However, the jump up a league meant they needed money for league fees, players' wages, and better equipment, and they had none. Their savior came in the form of Pietro Rezza, a southerner from the region of Apulia who had married into one of the town's wealthiest families and who left the operation of the team to his niece's husband, Gabriele Gravina.

The club's promotion to the Prima Categoria came only two years later. At this point, it was no longer possible to remain competitive by fielding a team composed solely of local talent, and although they were still not a professional team, Gravina "hired in" players from out of town to work at local jobs and thus be available to play for the team. In this way, the team quickly moved up the ranks, and by 1989 it had reached the professional ranks of Serie C2.

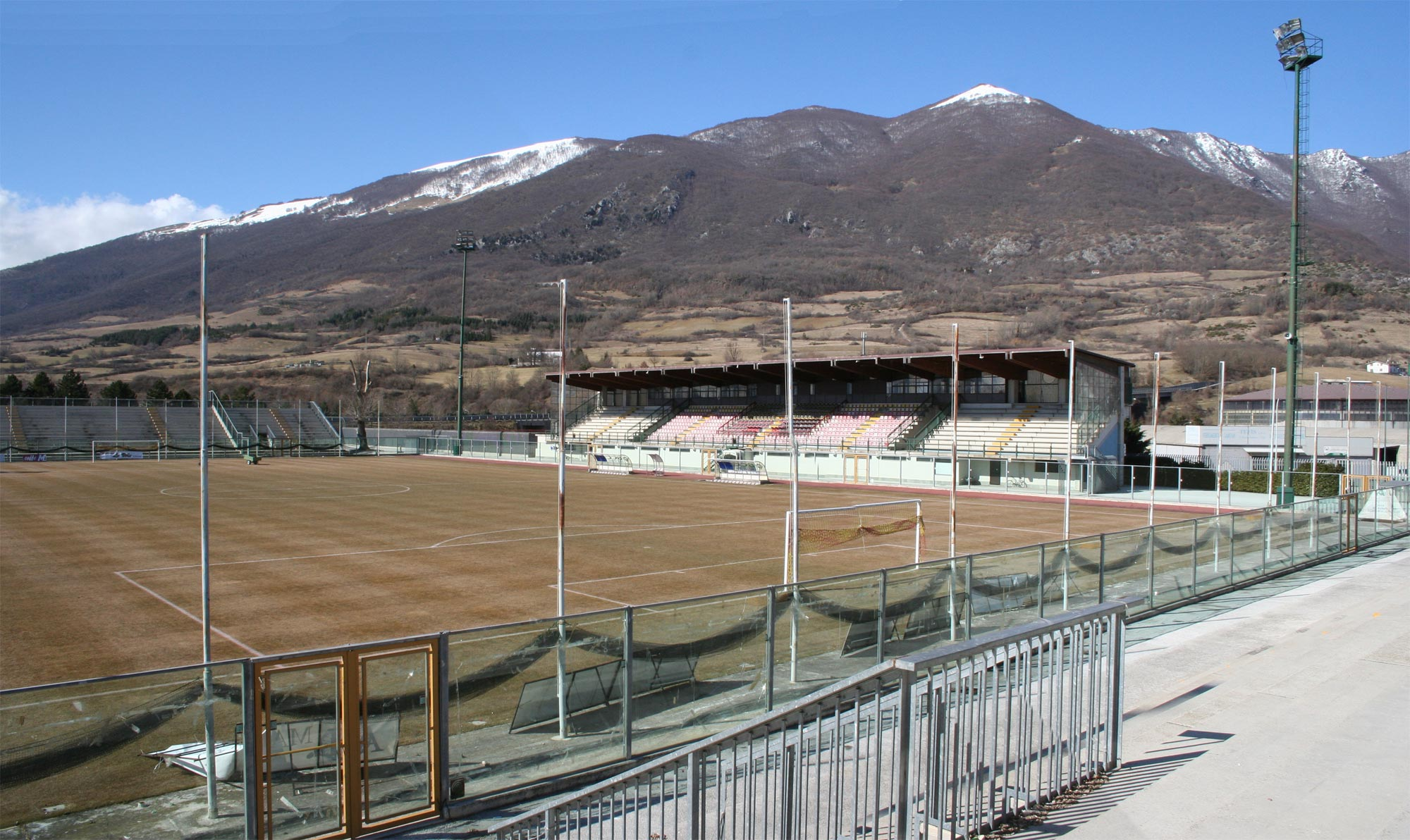
Stadium "Teofilo Patini", home grounds for Castel di Sangro Calcio

=== 1993–1996 ===
At this point, the road to success became a little bumpy, and they struggled to stay in C2. One-third of the way through the 1993–94, things were looking bad and they were facing relegation. Gravina brought in manager Osvaldo Jaconi, who worked a minor miracle by leading the team to a seventh-place finish. The next season, he astonished again by taking them to Serie C1.

The difference between C1 and C2 is vast. C2 may be professional, but it is barely so, and the teams are generally from small towns. Still, it was mind-boggling that a team from tiny Castel di Sangro deep in the hinterlands of the Abruzzo not only made it there but lasted seven years. For them to get to C1 was inconceivable, for C1 contained truly professional teams, some of whom had even been in Serie A at one point (Ascoli had been there in 1990, and Lecce in 1993; both would later return to Serie A).

Naturally, expectations were low. Simply staying in C1 itself would have been quite an accomplishment, but Jaconi outperformed far beyond that; that season they finished second, meaning they qualified for the playoffs to determine promotion to Serie B. Their first playoff was a two-legged match against nearby Gualdo. They lost the first match 1–0 on the road. At home, it looked as if the match would end in a scoreless tie (meaning that Castel di Sangro would lose on the aggregate score), when Jaconi made a seemingly bizarre substitution. With only fifteen seconds or so left, he sent in a defender who had played in only seven games the entire season. His maneuver worked to perfection: He scored seven seconds after that. Castel di Sangro thus advanced, having finished higher in the standings than fifth-place Gualdo.

The second playoff was a single match against Ascoli, to whom they had lost twice during the season. Ninety minutes went by without a goal, then thirty minutes more of overtime, still without a score, and it was up to a penalty shootout to decide the victor. One minute before the end of overtime, Jaconi had made another inexplicable substitution: He sent in Pietro Spinosa, a goalkeeper who had not played a single minute that season. As the shootout progressed, neither side missed, until the eighth round, when Spinosa made a seemingly impossible save, securing the victory — and promotion — for his team. This was the "Miracle of Castel di Sangro".

=== The Serie B debut: 1996–97 season ===
Having been in the lower leagues, the team was forced to upgrade their stadium in accordance with Serie B regulations, and as construction hadn't finished by the beginning of the season, they played their first several home matches in nearby Chieti. After months of delays, when it finally did open in December, the severe winter weather and poor fertilizer made the pitch unplayable, causing their first fixture there to be called off. Later that month two of their players, Danilo Di Vincenzo and Pippo Biondi, died in a car crash.

At the beginning of 1997, another player, Gigi Prete, was arrested in connection with a drug-smuggling operation. Prete was eventually acquitted after being detained for 22 weeks.

It looked like they were going to get some help in the form of Joe Addo of FSV Frankfurt of the German Oberliga Hessen. He was also captain of the Ghana national football team, which had made the semifinals in the 1996 Summer Olympics. However, Jaconi refused to sign the contract and Addo went on to Sparta Rotterdam of the Eredivisie.

Following this, Gravina announced the team was to sign a Nigerian player from Leicester City F.C. of the FA Premier League named Robert Ponnick. Being the first Premiership player to play in Serie B, the press crowded his debut in an exhibition match. The match was a disaster, with Ponnick showing almost no sense of understanding football and getting into a fight with one of his teammates. At the end, it was revealed that the opposing team was an acting troupe and he was one of its members. The whole charade had been cooked up by Gravina in order to generate publicity. As might be expected, it worked, but all of the press was sharply negative.

Throughout the turmoil, the team was near the bottom of the standings, and only monumental performances by goalkeeper Massimo Lotti as well as critical goals by Claudio Bonomi and Gionatha Spinesi (obtained on loan from Inter Milan) kept them from falling to the bottom. In the second-to-last game, they scored a 2–1 victory over Pescara to keep from being relegated, and the miracle continued.

According to McGinniss, the last match of the season was fixed; he overheard players before the match discussing how Bari, who needed a victory to ensure promotion to Serie A, would be allowed to score three goals and win, with Castel di Sangro allowed one consolation goal from a penalty kick. One player explained to him that Bari had asked for a favor, and even had they not done so, Castel di Sangro was unlikely to win anyway because of the emotional and physical toll consumed by the relegation battle. However, because "it is demanded by il sistema" (McGinniss claims that several members of the Castel di Sangro squad told him that the pre-arrangement of results in end-of-season matches that are significant to one of the teams was common in Italian football), the team could not possibly refuse. Bari won the match 3–1, Castel di Sangro's goal coming from a penalty.

=== Falling down: 1997–98 season and on ===
Their second year in Serie B did not go nearly as well. Many players were sold or left through other means, and Jaconi was fired midway through the season. Their relegation that year was their first in any league since 1983.

The first year back in Serie C1, however, saw some success in the 1999 Coppa Italia, where they were able to defeat Serie A teams Perugia and Salernitana before losing to Inter Milan in the quarterfinals.

In 2005, the club was wound up due to financial issues. Out of its ashes a new club was formed, called Pro Castel Di Sangro.

=== Quest for promotion ===
In the 2005–2006 Promozione season, Pro Castel di Sangro battled for promotion from beginning to end. After a long, hard fought season, the club fell short of promotion by three points (73) to Canistro (76). In 2006–07, Pro Castel di Sangro clearly won the league with an 11-point advantage to the second-placed team, moving up the ranks of Italian football to Eccellenza for the next season, with a squad featuring former Serie B protagonists Bonomi and Martino. Pro Castel di Sangro then ended their first Eccellenza campaign of the 2000s with a mid-table placement, in a league which also featured former professional teams Chieti (who were eventually crowned champions) and L'Aquila.

In Summer 2008 the club changed its name to A.S.D. Castel di Sangro Calcio.
