= Caso Genoa =

2005 Italian football scandal

Caso Genoa was an Italian football scandal in 2005. In the 2004–05 Serie B season, Genoa won the Serie B championship and were set to be promoted to the Serie A for the first time in 10 years. Genoa went into their final match of the season against Venezia on 11 June 2005, having already secured at least promotion play-off, and beat Venezia 3–2. However, three days later, it was discovered that Stefano Capozucca, a director of Genoa, had paid Venezia director Giuseppe Pagliara €250,000 for his team to intentionally lose the match. It was later found that the principal protagonists behind the scandal were Genoa's president, Enrico Preziosi, and Venezia's president, Franco Dal Cin.

On 8 August 2005, the Italian Football Federation (FIGC) determined that Genoa would be relegated to Serie C1 with a three-point penalty; it was the second time in Genoa's history that they had dropped out of the top two divisions, the first being in 1970. In addition, Preziosi, Dal Cin, Pagliara and Capozucca were each banned from Italian football for five years, while Michele Dal Cin was banned for three years and one month.
