= List of Palermo FC managers =

This is a list of Palermo Football Club managers since 1930:

Name	Nationality	From	To
Tony Cargnelli	Austria	1930	1931
Gyula Feldmann	Hungary	1931	1934
Karl Csapkay	Hungary	1935	1935
Gyula Lelovich	Hungary	1935	1936
Angelo Benincasa	Italy	1936	1936
Karl Csapkay	Hungary	1936	1937
Árpád Hajós	Hungary	1937	1938
Armand Halmos	Hungary	1938	1939
Ermenegildo Negri	Italy	1939	1940
Otto Krappan	Germany	1941	1942
Renato Nigiotti	Italy	1942	1943
Maximiliano Faotto	Uruguay	1945	1947
Virginio Rosetta	Italy	1947	1948
Giovanni Varglien	Italy	1948	1949
Giuseppe Viani	Italy	1949	1951
Remo Galli	Italy	1951	1952
Guido Masetti	Italy	1952	1952
Luigi Bonizzoni	Italy	1952	1953
József Bánás	Hungary	1953	1953
Giovanni Varglien	Italy	1953	1953
Rudolf Hiden	Austria	1953	1954
Adolfo Baloncieri	Italy	1954	1955
Mario Sperone	Italy	1955	1955
Carlo Rigotti	Italy	1955	1956
Héctor Puricelli	Uruguay	1956	1957
Attilio Kossovel	Italy	1957	1958
Pietro Rava	Italy	1958	1958
Carlo Rigotti	Italy	1958	1958
Čestmír Vycpálek	Czechoslovakia	1958	1960
Fioravante Baldi	Italy	1960	1961
Oscar Montez	Argentina	1961	1962
Fioravante Baldi	Italy	1962	1963
Oscar Montez	Argentina	1963	1963
László Székely	Hungary	1963	1965
Carlo Facchini	Italy	1965	1966
Camillo Achilli	Italy	1966	1967
Carmelo Di Bella	Italy	1967	1971
Benigno De Grandi	Italy	1971	1972
Umberto Pinardi	Italy	1972	1973
Alvaro Biagini	Italy	1973	1973
Corrado Viciani	Italy	1973	1975
Benigno De Grandi	Italy	1975	1975
Antonio De Bellis	Italy	1975	1977
Giuseppe Grassotti	Italy	1977	1977
Fernando Veneranda	Italy	1977	1979
Giancarlo Cadé	Italy	1979	1980
Fernando Veneranda	Italy	1980	1981
Vincenzo Urbani	Italy	1981	1981
Carmelo Di Bella	Italy	1981	1981
Antonio Renna	Italy	1981	1983
Carmelo Del Noce	Italy	1983	1983
Gustavo Giagnoni	Italy	1983	1984
Graziano Landoni	Italy	1984	1984
Tom Rosati	Australia	1984	1985
Antonio Valentín Angelillo	Argentina	1985	1986
Fernando Veneranda	Italy	1986	1986
Giuseppe Caramanno	Italy	1987	1988
Giorgio Rumignani	Italy	1988	1989
Franco Liguori	Italy	1989	1990
Enzo Ferrari	Italy	1990	1992
Gianni Di Marzio	Italy	1992	1992
Angelo Orazi	Italy	1992	1993
Enrico Nicolini	Italy	1993	1994
Gaetano Salvemini	Italy	1994	1995
Giampiero Vitali	Italy	1995	1995
Ignazio Arcoleo	Italy	1995	1997
Giampiero Vitali	Italy	1997	1997
Giorgio Rumignani	Italy	1997	1998
Ignazio Arcoleo	Italy	1998	1998
Massimo Morgia	Italy	1998	2000
Giuliano Sonzogni	Italy	July 2000	June 2001
Ezio Sella	Italy	April 2001	June 2001
Bortolo Mutti	Italy	July 2001	June 2002
Roberto Pruzzo	Italy	2002	2002
Ezio Glerean	Italy	2002	2002
Daniele Arrigoni	Italy	July 2002	February 2003
Nedo Sonetti	Italy	2003	2003
Silvio Baldini	Italy	July 2003	January 2004
Francesco Guidolin	Italy	January 2004	June 2005
Luigi Delneri	Italy	July 2005	January 2006
Giuseppe Papadopulo	Italy	January 2006	June 2006
Francesco Guidolin	Italy	June 2006	April 2007
Renzo Gobbo; Rosario Pergolizzi	Italy; Italy	April 2007	May 2007
Francesco Guidolin	Italy	2007	2007
Stefano Colantuono	Italy	2007	2007
Francesco Guidolin	Italy	November 2007	March 2008
Stefano Colantuono	Italy	March 2008	September 2008
Davide Ballardini	Italy	September 2008	June 2009
Walter Zenga	Italy	July 2009	November 2009
Delio Rossi	Italy	November 2009	February 2011
Serse Cosmi	Italy	February 2011	April 2011
Delio Rossi	Italy	2011	2011
Stefano Pioli	Italy	June 2011	August 2011
Devis Mangia	Italy	August 2011	December 2011
Bortolo Mutti	Italy	December 2011	May 2012
Giuseppe Sannino	Italy	June 2012	September 2012
Gian Piero Gasperini	Italy	September 2012	February 2013
Alberto Malesani	Italy	February 2013	March 2013
Gian Piero Gasperini	Italy	March 2013	March 2013
Giuseppe Sannino	Italy	March 2013	June 2013
Gennaro Gattuso	Italy	June 2013	September 2013
Giuseppe Iachini	Italy	September 2013	November 2015
Davide Ballardini	Italy	November 2015	January 2016
Fabio Viviani	Italy	January 2016	January 2016
Giovanni Tedesco	Italy	January 2016	February 2016
Giovanni Bosi	Italy	February 2016	February 2016
Giuseppe Iachini	Italy	February 2016	March 2016
Walter Novellino	Italy	March 2016	April 2016
Davide Ballardini	Italy	April 2016	September 2016
Roberto De Zerbi	Italy	September 2016	November 2016
Eugenio Corini	Italy	November 2016	January 2017
Diego López	Uruguay	January 2017	April 2017
Diego Bortoluzzi	Italy	April 2017	June 2017
Bruno Tedino	Italy	June 2017	April 2018
Roberto Stellone	Italy	April 2018	June 2018
Bruno Tedino	Italy	June 2018	September 2018
Roberto Stellone	Italy	September 2018	April 2019
Delio Rossi	Italy	April 2019	June 2019
Pasquale Marino	Italy	June 2019	July 2019
Rosario Pergolizzi	Italy	July 2019	August 2020
Roberto Boscaglia	Italy	August 2020	February 2021
Giacomo Filippi	Italy	February 2021	December 2021
Silvio Baldini	Italy	December 2021	July 2022
Eugenio Corini	Italy	August 2022	April 2024
Michele Mignani	Italy	April 2024	June 2024
Alessio Dionisi	Italy	June 2024	
