= 2006–07 US Città di Palermo season =

U.S. Città di Palermo
2006–07 season
- Chairman: Maurizio Zamparini
- Manager: Francesco Guidolin (Days 1–33, 36–38); Renzo Gobbo (Days 34–36)
- Serie A: 5th (UEFA Cup)
- UEFA Cup: Group stage
- Coppa Italia: Round of 16
- Top goalscorer: League: Eugenio Corini (10); All: Eugenio Corini and David Di Michele (10)
- Highest home attendance: 34,261 (vs Catania – 20 September 2006)
- Lowest home attendance: 8,521 (vs Sampdoria – 30 November 2006)

U.S. Città di Palermo played the season 2006–07 in the Serie A league. It has been the third season in a row for Palermo in the top division of Italy.

== Review and events ==
Palermo initially ended the 2005–06 season in eighth place, and thus was expected to play the UEFA Intertoto Cup 2006. Meanwhile, Francesco Guidolin was re-hired at Giuseppe Papadopulo's place. However, due to the Serie A scandal of 2006, the FIGC had stated they would not enter Palermo into the Intertoto Cup.

After the verdicts penalized numerous clubs, Palermo's overall position for that season was elevated to 5th, meaning they had qualified for the 2006–2007 UEFA Cup. In the transfer window, Palermo spent millions adding players to their squad, including Aimo Diana, Mark Bresciano, Fábio Simplício and Amauri, but sold World Cup winner Fabio Grosso to Internazionale. Several football experts and pundits tipped Palermo to do well in the season ahead, including Alessandro Del Piero.

They started well by knocking out English side West Ham United in the UEFA Cup. However, this time around the group stage proved to be more difficult than the previous year, and Palermo finished last in a group that contained Celta de Vigo, Eintracht Frankfurt, Fenerbahçe SK and Newcastle United.

For the first time in its history Palermo sat on top of the Serie A table in September 2006 after beating Catania 5–3 at home in the Sicilian derby. Another notable victory was a 2–0 away win to AC Milan at San Siro stadium. A serious knee injury for Amauri caused Palermo to replace the powerful striker, and Uruguayan Edinson Cavani and Polish Radosław Matusiak were signed in the Winter transfer market, together with midfielders Maurizio Ciaramitaro and Guillermo Giacomazzi.

On 2 February 2007 Palermo was involved in a controversial away Sicilian derby match which was suspended for 30 minutes during the second half after some tear gas explosions from outside the stadium, used by the police to minimize hooliganism outside the Massimino Stadium, drifted onto the playing area. After the match, violence went on and policeman Filippo Raciti was killed by a small explosive launched by a Catania hooligan. This led Commissioner Luca Pancalli to suspend indefinitely football leagues and national team matches in the whole country. Following these events Palermo, which was clearly third-placed at the time, was not able to achieve a single victory, and dropped to sixth position in the Serie A. Maurizio Zamparini, the chairman, became more and more critical of Guidolin, who was finally sacked on 23 April following a 3–4 home defeat to third-last placed Parma which extended the run of poor results to 11 games without a single win. Assistant coach Renzo Gobbo and youth team coach Rosario Pergolizzi were subsequently appointed as caretaker coaches at Guidolin's place. On their debut match, Pergolizzi and Gobbo led Palermo to a 2–1 away win at Livorno, finally ending the negative run. The victory was however followed by two further defeats, including an upset 3–2 away loss against last-placed team Ascoli, already relegated to Serie B, which left the rosanero in seventh place, the last UEFA Cup spot, only three points above Atalanta. The events led Zamparini to reappoint Guidolin as head coach for the remaining two matches. Guidolin's return brought two victories, to Siena and Udinese, clinched fifth place in the final table, qualification to the UEFA Cup 2007-08 for the third consecutive time and broke its previous record of 53 points of two years before.

== Match results ==
=== Serie A ===
Pos	Team	Pld	W	D	L	GF	GA	GD	Pts	Qualification or relegation
3	Lazio (Note: Fiorentina were docked 15 points, Reggina 11 points, Milan 8 points and Lazio 3 points, all for involvement in the 2006 Italian football scandal.)	38	18	11	9	59	33	+26	62	Qualification to Champions League third qualifying round
4	Milan	38	19	12	7	57	36	+21	61	Qualification to Champions League group stage (Note: Milan qualified for 2007–08 UEFA Champions League group stage instead of third qualifying round as the title holders.)
5	Palermo	38	16	10	12	58	51	+7	58	Qualification to UEFA Cup first round
6	Fiorentina	38	21	10	7	62	31	+31	58	Qualification to UEFA Cup first round
7	Empoli	38	14	12	12	42	43	−1	54	Qualification to UEFA Cup first round

Source: "Serie A 2006/2007 - 38. Round". worldfootball.net. 21 July 2025.
Rules for classification: 1) points; 2) goal difference; 3) number of goals scored.
Notes:

Legend
Win	Draw	Loss

Date and time	Opponent	Venue	Result	Scorers	Attendance
10 September 2006 – 15.00	Reggina	Home	Won 4–3	Bresciano, Biava, Corini, Amauri	24,509
17 September 2006 – 15.00	Lazio	Away	Won 2–1	Di Michele (2)	20,395
20 September 2006 – 20.30	Catania	Home	Won 5–3	Tedesco, Simplício, Corini, Amauri, Barzagli	34,261
24 September 2006 – 15.00	Empoli	Away	Lost 0–2		4,672
1 October 2006 – 20.30	Chievo	Away	Won 1–0	Corini	6,184
15 October 2006 – 15.00	Atalanta	Home	Lost 2–3	Bresciano, Corini	21,716
22 October 2006 – 20.30	AC Milan	Away	Won 2–0	Bresciano, Amauri	50,028
25 October 2006 – 20.30	Messina	Home	Won 2–1	Zaccardo, Di Michele	28,547
29 October 2006 – 15.00	Fiorentina	Away	Won 3–2	Di Michele, Amauri (2)	34,050
5 November 2006 – 15.00	Sampdoria	Home	Won 2–0	Corini, Zaccardo	22,244
12 November 2006 – 15.00	Torino	Home	Won 3–0	Corini, Di Michele, Amauri	26,642
18 November 2006 – 20.30	Cagliari	Away	Lost 0–1	Bresciano, Biava, Corini, Amauri	?
26 November 2006 – 20.30	Inter	Home	Lost 1–2	Amauri	34,095
3 December 2006 – 15.00	Parma	Away	Drew 0–0		14,173
9 December 2006 – 20.30	Livorno	Home	Won 3–0	Simplício (2), Amauri	20,441
17 December 2006 – 20.30	AS Roma	Away	Lost 0–4		40,124
20 December 2006 – 20.30	Ascoli	Home	Won 4–0	Bresciano, Corini, Tedesco, Capuano	19,485
23 December 2006 – 15.00	Siena	Away	Drew 1–1	Simplício	6,411
14 January 2007 – 15.00	Udinese	Home	Won 2–0	Caracciolo, Zaccardo	20,913
20 January 2007 – 20.30	Reggina	Away	Drew 0–0		11,745
27 January 2007 – 20.30	Lazio	Home	Lost 0–3		22,453
2 February 2007 – 18.00	Catania	Away	Won 2–1	Caracciolo, Di Michele	21,000
11 February 2007 – 15.00	Empoli	Home	Lost 0–1		19,144
18 February 2007 – 15.00	Chievo	Home	Drew 1–1	Di Michele	22,057
24 February 2007 – 20.30	Atalanta	Away	Drew 1–1	Diana	8,092
28 February 2007 – 15.00	AC Milan	Home	Drew 0–0		25,361
4 March 2007 – 15.00	Messina	Away	Lost 0–2		11,521
11 March 2007 – 15.00	Fiorentina	Home	Drew 1–1	Cavani	22,476
17 March 2007 – 20.30	Sampdoria	Away	Drew 1–1	Cavani	17,596
1 April 2007 – 15.00	Torino	Away	Drew 0–0		20,932
7 April 2007 – 15.00	Cagliari	Home	Lost 1–3	Bresciano	21,655
15 April 2007 – 20.30	Inter	Away	Drew 2–2	Caracciolo, Zaccardo	46,611
22 April 2007 – 20.30	Parma	Home	Lost 3–4	Bresciano, Di Michele, Zaccardo	21,472
29 April 2007 – 15.00	Livorno	Away	Won 2–1	Corini, Di Michele	7,750
6 May 2007 – 15.00	AS Roma	Home	Lost 1–2	Tedesco	24,680
13 May 2007 – 15.00	Ascoli	Away	Lost 2–3	Simplício, Matusiak	4,352
20 May 2007 – 15.00	Siena	Home	Won 2–1	Corini, Caracciolo	20,043
27 May 2007 – 15.00	Udinese	Away	Won 2–1	Caracciolo, Corini	5,000

=== UEFA Cup ===
Date and time	Round	Opponent	Venue	Result	Scorers	Attendance
14 September 2006 – 21.00	1st round – 1st Leg	(England) West Ham United	Away	Won 1–0	Caracciolo	32,222
28 September 2006 – 20.45	1st round – 2nd Leg	(England) West Ham United	Home	Won 3–0	Simplício (2), Di Michele	19,284
19 October 2006 – 18.15	Group Stage	(Germany) Eintracht Frankfurt	Away	Won 2–1	Brienza, Zaccardo	50,000
2 November 2006 – 20.45	Group Stage	(England) Newcastle	Home	Lost 0–1		16,091
23 November 2006 – 19.00	Group Stage	(Turkey) Fenerbahçe	Away	Lost 0–3		39,071
13 December 2006 – 20.45	Group Stage	(Spain) Celta Vigo	Home	Drew 1–1	Tedesco	10,222

=== Coppa Italia ===
Date and time	Round	Opponent	Venue	Result	Scorers	Attendance
8 November 2006 – 20.30	Round of 16 – 1st Leg	Sampdoria	Away	Lost 0–1		9,120
30 November 2006 – 21.00	Round of 16 – 2nd Leg	Sampdoria	Home	Lost 2–3	Guana, Brienza	8,521

== Player details ==
No.	Pos	Nat	Player	Total		Serie A		UEFA Cup		Coppa Italia	
No.	Pos	Nat	Player	Apps	Goals	Apps	Goals	Apps	Goals	Apps	Goals
1	GK	(Italy) ITA	Federico Agliardi	11	-17	7+2	-13	1	-1	1	-3
12	GK	(Italy) ITA	Alberto Fontana	35	-36	31	-38	4	2	0	0
20	GK	(Italy) ITA	Salvatore Sirigu	2	-4	0	0	1	-3	1	-1
2	DF	(Italy) ITA	Cristian Zaccardo	42	6	35+1	5	4+1	1	1	0
15	DF	(Italy) ITA	Hernán Paolo Dellafiore	13	0	5+2	0	3+1	0	2	0
16	DF	(Italy) ITA	Mattia Cassani	36	0	22+7	0	4+1	0	2	0
21	DF	(Italy) ITA	Giuseppe Biava	27	1	22+2	1	1+2	0	0	0
26	DF	(Italy) ITA	Marco Pisano	39	0	30+3	0	5	0	1	0
32	DF	(Italy) ITA	Ciro Capuano	9	1	2+5	1	1+1	0	0	0
43	DF	(Italy) ITA	Andrea Barzagli (vice-captain)	42	1	36	1	5	0	1	0
53	DF	(Italy) ITA	Alberto Cossentino	3	0	0	0	1	0	2	0
4	MF	(Italy) ITA	Giovanni Tedesco	31	4	8+18	3	2+1	1	2	0
5	MF	(Italy) ITA	Eugenio Corini (captain)	29	10	27	10	2	0	0	0
8	MF	(Italy) ITA	Aimo Diana	28	1	20+5	1	2+1	0	0	0
14	MF	(Italy) ITA	Roberto Guana	40	1	29+4	0	3+3	0	1	1
18	MF	(Uruguay) URU	Guillermo Giacomazzi	7	0	0+7	0	0	0	0	0
22	MF	(Italy) ITA	Maurizio Ciaramitaro	6	0	3+3	0	0	0	0	0
23	MF	(Australia) AUS	Mark Bresciano	39	6	32+2	6	3+1	0	1	0
30	MF	(Brazil) BRA	Fábio Simplício	40	7	32+1	5	4+1	2	2	0
50	MF	(Italy) ITA	Nicola Ficano	3	0	0	0	1	0	2	0
90	MF	(Italy) ITA	Franco Brienza	29	2	9+13	0	3+2	1	2	1
7	FW	(Uruguay) URU	Edinson Cavani	7	2	4+3	2	0	0	0	0
9	FW	(Poland) POL	Radosław Matusiak	3	1	1+2	1	0	0	0	0
10	FW	(Italy) ITA	Andrea Caracciolo	35	6	17+10	5	6	1	2	0
11	FW	(Brazil) BRA	Amauri	19	8	17+1	8	0	0	1	0
17	FW	(Italy) ITA	David Di Michele	33	10	28+1	9	3+1	1	0	0
Players sold or loaned out during the January transfer market:
3	DF	(Italy) ITA	Cesare Bovo	2	0	0+1	0	0	0	1	0
18	MF	(Italy) ITA	Francesco Parravicini	14	0	1+7	0	4+1	0	1	0
22	MF	(Italy) ITA	Gianni Munari	5	0	0	0	3	0	2	0

=== January transfer market bids ===
In

18	MF	URU	Guillermo Giacomazzi (on loan from Lecce)
22	MF	ITA	Maurizio Ciaramitaro (loan return from Parma)
7	FW	URU	Edinson Cavani (from Danubio)
9	FW	POL	Radosław Matusiak (from GKS Bełchatów)

Out

3	DF	ITA	Cesare Bovo (loaned to Torino)
18	MF	ITA	Francesco Parravicini (loaned to Parma, co-owned with Fiorentina)
22	MF	ITA	Gianni Munari (loaned to Lecce)

== See also ==
- 2006–07 in Italian football
- 2007 Catania football violence
