= 2008–09 US Città di Palermo season =

U.S. Città di Palermo
2008–09 season
- Chairman: Maurizio Zamparini
- Manager: Stefano Colantuono (until 4 September 2008); Davide Ballardini (from 4 September 2008)
- Serie A: 8th
- Coppa Italia: Third round
- Top goalscorer: League: Edinson Cavani; Fabrizio Miccoli (14 goals); All: Edinson Cavani (15 goals)

U.S. Città di Palermo spent the 2008–09 season in the Serie A, the fifth season in a row for the Sicilian club in the Italian top flight since their return to the league in 2004.

== Review and events ==
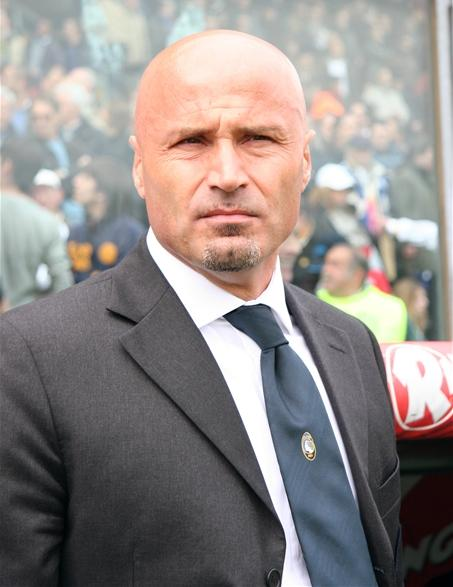
Stefano Colantuono was originally confirmed as Palermo head coach for the 2008–09 season

For the upcoming season, Palermo are expected to confirm Stefano Colantuono as head coach. A number of signings were completed in mid-season, namely Brazilian striker Túlio de Melo from Le Mans (free transfer), and young Danish defender Simon Kjær from Midtjylland; these are expected to be joined by a number of loan and co-ownership returns, such as Hernan Dellafiore from Torino. On May 28, Palermo announced to have signed Empoli defender Andrea Raggi in a full transfer. Two days later, the rosanero also finalized the signing of former Fiorentina midfielder Fabio Liverani. On June 5 Palermo announced on their website to have finalized the signing of Italy national team and Livorno goalkeeper Marco Amelia.

On June 19, Palermo announced to have re-signed Croatian striker Igor Budan from Parma and Genoa defender Cesare Bovo, the latter in exchange with long-time rosanero Giuseppe Biava. Six days later, the club completed the signing of Atalanta centre-back Moris Carrozzieri. On July 1, the club finalized the signing of Davide Lanzafame from Juventus in a co-ownership bid.

In addition, Palermo-born Giovanni Tedesco and 41-year-old goalkeeper Alberto Fontana have agreed a one-year contract extension.

On the other hand, a number of transfer were completed, with Amauri sold to Juventus (and Antonio Nocerino being signed by Palermo as part of the deal), Leandro Rinaudo transferred to Napoli and Italian internationals Cristian Zaccardo and Andrea Barzagli signed by German side VfL Wolfsburg;

Palermo's pre-season phase will begin on July 14 to the training camp of Bad Kleinkirchheim, Austria. They then moved to another camp in Levico Terme on August 1, then playing a friendly match in Wolfsburg against VfL Wolfsburg.

Palermo started their season with a surprise 1–2 home loss to Ravenna, a Lega Pro Prima Divisione team (two divisions below Serie A). Successively, Zamparini confirmed the intention to sell newly acquired striker Túlio de Melo, citing the impossibility to ensure the player a guaranteed place in the starting lineup as he wanted. In the meantime, on August 30, and just a few hours before the rosanero's kickoff league match, Palermo announced the signing of 18-year-old striker Levan Mchedlidze on loan. The next day, Lille confirmed to have finalized the permanent signing of Melo from Palermo. On 1 September, Palermo completed both the signing of Davide Succi from Ravenna the loaning out of Boško Janković to Genoa. Both moves were finalized following several unsuccessful attempts to sign Brazilian international striker Nilmar from Internacional, as confirmed in a club statement.

The very next day saw notable criticism from supporters and local and national media regarding the club's strategy in the transfer market, particularly underlining the lack of an appropriate replacement for Amauri and the controversial sale of Túlio de Melo a mere two months after signing with the rosanero. Zamparini responded to these criticisms by making the whole bid amounts in the seasons available to the public, in a very unusual move in Italy, noting his club was among the ones who spent the most money in order to sign new players.

On September 4, 2008, in what was promptly received as another controversial move, the club surprisingly announced the immediate dismissal of Stefano Colantuono from his position, making him the first head coach to be sacked in the whole Serie A season, contemporaneously announcing the appointment of Davide Ballardini as new rosanero boss. Ballardini made his debut with an impressive 3–1 home win to Roma on September 13.

Ballardini then followed up the next week by beating Genoa 2–1, with centre-back Cesare Bovo scored a winning goal from 26 metres out.

Palermo's wonderful form continued as they stopped Italian giants Juventus 2–1, ending their unbeaten season. Fabrizio Miccoli scored a tap-in after Buffon deflected a volley from Uruguayan striker Edinson Cavani. Newly acquired youngster Levan Mchedlidze scored in only his second-ever game in the Italian Serie A, grabbing Palermo a surprise win. Palermo then went on to achieve impressive wins to less exciting games, not performing particularly well in away matches. Namely, striking duo of Fabrizio Miccoli and Edinson Cavani proved to be instrumental to the rosanero's successes, with the former Benfica star establishing himself as team topscorer despite being limited by injuries.

Another fan favourite win came in a league match against A.C. Milan, with the rosanero showing probably one of their finest seasonal performances and defeating 3–1 the rossoneri, with goals by Miccoli, Cavani and Simplicio, and Sicilian goalkeeper Marco Amelia being instrumental in the team win by saving a penalty shot by FIFA World Player winner Ronaldinho.

In the January 2009 transfer window, Palermo opted to loan out all of their players who did not play regularly in the first half, namely Hernán Paolo Dellafiore, Andrea Raggi, Davide Lanzafame and Maurizio Ciaramitaro. The club, with Igor Budan being unavailable for the whole season so far, was also linked with being interested to the likes of ACF Fiorentina striker Giampaolo Pazzini, who was ultimately acquired by Sampdoria. Later in the market window, Palermo also announced the loan of Ciro Capuano to Sicilian rivals Catania, and the signing for free of Mirko Savini from Napoli, then completing the transfer session with two international youngsters, Swiss full-back Michel Morganella and Uruguayan striker Abel Hernández.

The club went on performing relatively well with several ups and downs, the bottom point being a shock 0–4 home loss to Catania in the Sicilian derby, which was promptly followed by a 2–0 win at ACF Fiorentina's home. Palermo also managed to come back from two goals down to achieve a 2–2 draw at San Siro against José Mourinho's league leaders Internazionale thanks to efforts from Edinson Cavani and backup striker Davide Succi. In the second part of the season, Palermo declared interest in fighting to take a UEFA Europa League 2009–10 spot, with Roma, league surprise Cagliari and Lazio as main challengers.

On April 23, the Italian National Olympic Committee announced that Moris Carrozzieri was found positive for cocaine as he failed a doping test made immediately after a home game against Torino on April 5. The physical centre-back was immediately suspended from football activities and is likely to face a long ban that could keep him off from the game for up to two years. According to Palermo chairman Maurizio Zamparini and sports director Walter Sabatini, the player might likely have assumed cocaine during a night out in a club in Milan. Such events, which prived Palermo of one of the main defenders in the squad, were followed by a 0–3 loss to AC Milan, with two of the rossoneri goals being scored from controversial penalty kicks and Palermo reduced to 10 men after Cesare Bovo was sent off minutes after the beginning of the second half; this brought to bitter criticism against the referee from Maurizio Zamparini, who also announced a one-day news blackout as a form of protest.

=== Confirmed summer transfer market bids ===
In

—	GK	ITA	Marco Amelia (from Livorno, €6m)
—	DF	ITA	Cesare Bovo (from Genoa, co-ownership resolution, €5m)
—	FW	CRO	Igor Budan (from Parma, co-ownership resolution, €4.5m)
—	DF	ITA	Moris Carrozzieri (from Atalanta, €3.4m)
—	DF	ITA	Paolo Dellafiore (loan return from Torino, €400k)
—	DF	DEN	Simon Kjær (from FC Midtjylland, €4m)
—	FW	ITA	Davide Lanzafame (from Juventus, co-ownership, €2.5m)
—	MF	ITA	Fabio Liverani (from Fiorentina, free transfer)
—	FW	BRA	Túlio de Melo (from Le Mans UC72, €4.2m)
—	FW	GEO	Levan Mchedlidze (from Empoli, loan, €6.2m)
—	MF	ITA	Antonio Nocerino (from Juventus, €7.5m)
—	DF	ITA	Andrea Raggi (from Empoli, €7m)
—	FW	ITA	Davide Succi (from Ravenna, co-ownership, €1.75m)

Out

—	FW	BRA	Amauri (to Juventus, €22.8m)
—	DF	ITA	Andrea Barzagli (to VfL Wolfsburg, €12.95m)
—	DF	ITA	Giuseppe Biava (to Genoa, €500k)
—	MF	ITA	Andrea Bovo (to Padova, co-ownership resolution, €426k)
—	FW	ITA	Franco Brienza (to Reggina, €2.2m)
—	MF	ITA	Fabio Caserta (to Lecce, €1.6m)
—	MF	ARG	Mariano González (to Porto, €3.2m)
—	FW	BRA	Túlio de Melo (to Lille OSC, €4m)
—	MF	GHA	Daniel Mensah Boampong (to Bellinzona, free)
—	DF	ITA	Marco Pisano (to Torino, €1.5m)
—	DF	ITA	Leandro Rinaudo (to Napoli, €5.5m)
—	DF	ITA	Cristian Zaccardo (to Wolfsburg, €7m)

Out on loan

—	GK	ITA	Federico Agliardi (to Rimini)
—	FW	ALB	Edgar Çani (to Ascoli)
—	FW	ITA	Paolo Carbonaro (to Monopoli)
—	DF	ITA	Alberto Cossentino (to Triestina)
—	FW	ITA	Davis Curiale (to Vicenza)
—	MF	SRB	Boško Janković (to Genoa)
—	FW	SRI	Panushanth Kulenthiran (to Vibonese)
—	GK	ITA	Salvatore Sirigu (to Ancona)
—	DF	ITA	Emanuele Terranova (to Livorno)

=== Confirmed winter transfer market bids ===
In

—	MF	ITA	Daniel Cappelletti (from Cantù San Paolo (Eccellenza Lombardy))
—	DF	ITA	Alberto Cossentino (loan return from Triestina)
—	DF	SUI	Michel Morganella (from FC Basel)
—	FW	URU	Abel Hernández (from Peñarol)
—	DF	ITA	Mirko Savini (from Napoli, free transfer)

Out on loan

—	MF	ITA	Maurizio Ciaramitaro (to Salernitana)
—	FW	ITA	Davis Curiale (loan return from Vicenza, to Ravenna)
—	DF	ITA	Paolo Dellafiore (to Torino)
—	MF	ITA	Luca Di Matteo (to Cittadella)
—	FW	ITA	Davide Lanzafame (to Bari)
—	DF	ITA	Andrea Raggi (to Sampdoria)
—	DF	ITA	Ciro Capuano (to Catania)

== Player details ==
Season statistics

No.	Pos	Nat	Player	Total		Serie A		Coppa Italia	
No.	Pos	Nat	Player	Apps	Goals	Apps	Goals	Apps	Goals
1	GK	(Albania) ALB	Samir Ujkani	1	0	1	0	0	0
12	GK	(Italy) ITA	Alberto Fontana	5	-4	5	-4	0	0
32	GK	(Italy) ITA	Marco Amelia	35	-48	34	-46	1	-2
5	DF	(Italy) ITA	Cesare Bovo	29	1	28	1	1	0
6	DF	(Italy) ITA	Samuele Romeo	0	0	0	0	0	0
16	DF	(Italy) ITA	Mattia Cassani	36	1	36	1	0	0
21	DF	(Italy) ITA	Alberto Cossentino	0	0	0	0	0	0
24	DF	(Denmark) DEN	Simon Kjær	27	3	27	3	0	0
25	DF	(Italy) ITA	Mirko Savini	11	0	11	0	0	0
26	DF	(Switzerland) SUI	Michel Morganella	2	0	2	0	0	0
42	DF	(Italy) ITA	Federico Balzaretti	34	0	33	0	1	0
80	DF	(Italy) ITA	Moris Carrozzieri	24	0	23	0	1	0
4	MF	(Italy) ITA	Giovanni Tedesco	17	1	17	1	0	0
8	MF	(Italy) ITA	Giulio Migliaccio	31	3	31	3	0	0
11	MF	(Italy) ITA	Fabio Liverani (captain)	34	0	33	0	1	0
14	MF	(Italy) ITA	Roberto Guana	19	0	18	0	1	0
23	MF	(Australia) AUS	Mark Bresciano	27	4	26	4	1	0
30	MF	(Brazil) BRA	Fábio Simplício	37	8	36	8	1	0
33	MF	(Italy) ITA	Antonio Nocerino	33	0	33	0	0	0
7	FW	(Uruguay) URU	Edinson Cavani	36	15	35	14	1	1
10	FW	(Italy) ITA	Fabrizio Miccoli	33	14	32	14	1	0
19	FW	(Italy) ITA	Davide Succi	24	6	24	6	0	0
20	FW	(Croatia) CRO	Igor Budan	5	0	5	0	0	0
90	FW	(Uruguay) URU	Abel Hernández	6	0	6	0	0	0
99	FW	(Georgia (country)) GEO	Levan Mchedlidze	9	1	9	1	0	0
Players sold or loaned out during the summer transfer market:
17	MF	(Serbia) SRB	Boško Janković	1	0	1	0	0	0
9	FW	(Brazil) BRA	Túlio de Melo	1	0	0	0	1	0
72	FW	(Italy) ITA	Paolo Carbonaro	0	0	0	0	0	0
Players sold or loaned out during the winter transfer market:
3	DF	(Italy) ITA	Ciro Capuano	2	0	2	0	0	0
15	DF	(Italy) ITA	Paolo Dellafiore	5	0	4	0	1	0
46	DF	(Italy) ITA	Andrea Raggi	3	0	2	0	1	0
18	MF	(Italy) ITA	Maurizio Ciaramitaro	3	0	3	0	0	0
22	MF	(Italy) ITA	Luca Di Matteo	0	0	0	0	0	0
77	FW	(Italy) ITA	Davide Lanzafame	10	0	9	0	1	0

== Competitions ==
=== Serie A ===
Pos	Team	Pld	W	D	L	GF	GA	GD	Pts	Qualification or relegation
6	Roma	38	18	9	11	64	61	+3	63	Qualification to Europa League third qualifying round
7	Udinese	38	16	10	12	61	50	+11	58	
8	Palermo	38	17	6	15	57	50	+7	57	
9	Cagliari	38	15	8	15	49	50	−1	53	
10	Lazio	38	15	5	18	46	55	−9	50	Qualification to Europa League play-off round (Note: Lazio qualified for the play-off round of the 2009–10 UEFA Europa League by winning the 2008–09 Coppa Italia.)

Source: lega-calcio.it (in Italian)
Rules for classification: 1) points; 2) head-to-head points; 3) head-to-head goal difference; 4) head-to-head goals scored; 5) goal difference; 6) number of goals scored.

==== Matches ====
Legend
Win	Draw	Loss

Date	Opponent	Venue	Result	Scorers	Attendance	Position	Report
August 30, 2008 – 18:00	Udinese	Away	Lost 1–3	Bresciano			18
September 13, 2008 – 18:00	Roma	Home	Won 3–1	Miccoli (2), Cavani			
September 21, 2008 – 15:00	Genoa	Home	Won 2–1	Bovo, Cavani			4
September 24, 2008 – 15:00	Napoli	Away	Lost 2–1	Miccoli			
September 28, 2008 – 15:00	Reggina	Home	Won 1–0	Miccoli			
October 5, 2008 – 15:00	Juventus	Away	Won 2–1	Miccoli, Mchedlidze			
October 19, 2008 - 15:00	Catania	Away	Lost 0–2				Report
October 26, 2008 - 20:30	Fiorentina	Home	Lost 1–3	Simplício			Report
October 29, 2008 – 20:30	Lecce	Away	Drew 1–1	Cavani			Report
November 2, 2008 - 15:00	Chievo	Home	Won 3–0	Miccoli, Kjær, Cavani			
November 8, 2008 - 18:00	Torino	Away	Lost 0–1				Report
November 15, 2008 - 20:30	Internazionale	Home	Lost 0–2				Report
November 23, 2008 - 15:00	Bologna	Away	Drew 1–1	Succi			Report
November 30, 2008 - 20:30	AC Milan	Home	Won 3–1	Miccoli, Cavani, Simplício			Report
December 7, 2008 - 15:00	Cagliari	Away	Lost 0–1				Report
December 14, 2008 - 15:00	Siena	Home	Won 2–0	Cassani, Simplício			Report
December 20, 2008 - 18:00	Lazio	Away	Lost 0–1				Report
January 11, 2009 - 15:00	Atalanta	Home	Won 3–2	Miccoli, Bresciano, Cavani			Report
January 18, 2009 - 15:00	Sampdoria	Home	Won 2–0	Bresciano (2)			Report
January 25, 2009 - 15:00	Udinese	Home	Won 3–2	Simplício (2), Cavani			Report
January 28, 2009 - 20:30	AS Roma	Away	Lost 1–2	Cavani			Report
February 1, 2009 - 15:15	Genoa	Away	Lost 0–1				Report
February 8, 2009 - 20:30	Napoli	Home	Won 2–1	Migliaccio, Simplício			Report
February 15, 2009 - 15:00	Reggina	Away	Drew 0–0				Report
February 21, 2009 - 20:30	Juventus	Home	Lost 0–2				Report
March 1, 2009 - 15:00	Catania	Home	Lost 0–4				Report
March 8, 2009 - 15:00	Fiorentina	Away	Won 2–0	Simplício, Miccoli			Report
March 15, 2009 - 15:00	Lecce	Home	Won 5–2	Cavani (2), Simplício, Miccoli, Kjær			Report
March 22, 2009 - 15:00	Chievo	Away	Lost 0–1				Report
April 5, 2009 - 15:00	Torino	Home	Won 1–0	Cavani			Report
April 19, 2009 - 15:00	Internazionale	Away	Drew 2–2	Cavani, Succi			Report
April 19, 2009 - 15:00	Bologna	Home	Won 4–1	Belleri (own goal), Kjær, Succi, Cavani			Report
April 26, 2009 - 15:00	AC Milan	Away	Lost 0–3				Report
May 3, 2009 - 15:00	Cagliari	Home	Won 5–1	Migliaccio, Miccoli, Tedesco, Cavani, Succi			Report
May 10, 2009 - 15:00	Siena	Away	Lost 0–1				Report
May 17, 2009 - 15:00	Lazio	Home	Won 2–0	Miccoli, Migliaccio			Report
May 24, 2009 - 15:00	Atalanta	Away	Drew 2–2	Succi, Miccoli			Report
May 31, 2009 - 15:00	Sampdoria	Home	Drew 2–2	Miccoli, Succi			Report

=== Coppa Italia ===
Date	Round	Opponent	Venue	Result	Scorers	Attendance	Report
August 23, 2008 – 20:30	Third Round	Ravenna	Home	Lost 1–2	Cavani	16,000	(Report)

== See also ==
- 2008–09 in Italian football
