= 2015 Pro Duta FC season =

Pro Duta F.C
2015 season
- CEO: Wahyu Wahab Usman
- Head Coach: Alfredo Carlos Gonzalez Machado
- Stadium: Teladan, Medan, Indonesia
Home colours	Away colours

Pro Duta Football Club played in Liga Indonesia Premier Division in 2015. Their home games were played in Teladan Stadium, Medan.

== Players ==
=== 2015 First Team Squad ===
Note: Flags indicate national team as defined under FIFA eligibility rules; some limited exceptions apply. Players may hold more than one non-FIFA nationality.

No.	Pos.	Nation	Player
1	GK	IDN	Yuda Andika
2	GK	IDN	Muhammad Halim
3	DF	IDN	Sutrisno Purba
4	DF	IDN	Arif Rahman Adilah
7	MF	IDN	Faisal Azmi
11	DF	IDN	Arifin Wael
12	DF	IDN	Hendrajid Nahumahury
15	FW	IDN	Fiwi Dwipan
16	DF	IDN	Rahmadhany Fidnadi
17	FW	IDN	Heri Irwansyah
18	DF	IDN	Nico C Sinurat

No.	Pos.	Nation	Player
19	MF	IDN	Muhammad Iqbal
20	MF	IDN	Muhammad Syamir
21	FW	IDN	Muhammad Fadil Redian
22	GK	IDN	Yudha Hananta
23	DF	IDN	Arsyad Yusgiantoro
24	DF	IDN	Fajar Handika
25	DF	IDN	Suyatno
26	MF	IDN	Agus Pranoto
28	FW	IDN	Indra Kembar Bungsu
36	DF	IDN	Romi Agustiawan
42	FW	IDN	Arif Sajali

== Friendly Matches ==
=== International Friendly Matches ===
29 January 2015 Friendly	S.S.D. Massese (Italy)	7 - 0	(Indonesia) Pro Duta	Massa, Italy
				Stadium: Stadio degli Oliveti

30 January 2015 Friendly	Pro Duta (Indonesia)	3 - 1	(Australia) APIA Leichhardt	Italy
	Arsyad; Arsyad; Zhifar			Stadium: Cavanis Stadium

==== 2015 Viareggio Cup - Italia ====
The Torneo di Viareggio (English: Viareggio Tournament), official name Viareggio Cup World Football Tournament Coppa Carnevale, is one of the most important youth football tournaments in the world. It is officially recognized by CONI, FIGC, UEFA and FIFA. It is held each year in Viareggio, Tuscany and its surroundings, starting on the begins the third last Carnival Monday. The tournament runs for a fortnight, and finishes on the last Monday of Carnival. For this reason, it is also known as Coppa Carnevale (Carnival Cup). In 2015 Viareggio Cup Pro Duta FC represented by its U-19 young team. In 2015 Viareggio Cup Pro Duta FC joined in Group 5 together with Inter Milan, K.R.C. Genk and Parma F.C.

Team	Pld	W	D	L	GF	GA	GD	Poin
Inter Milan	3	3	0	0	8	2	6	9
K.R.C. Genk	3	2	0	1	7	4	3	6
Parma F.C.	3	1	0	2	8	5	3	3
Pro Duta FC	3	0	0	3	0	12	-12	0

3 February 2015 Group 5	Parma F.C. (Italy)	6 - 0	(Indonesia) Pro Duta	Italy
15:00 CET	Lorenzo Mitta 11'; Didiba Mboke 42', 58'; Gonzalo Martinez 47', 57', 71'	Report		Stadium: Stadio Cavanis; Referee: (Italy) Finzi

5 February 2015 Group 5	K.R.C. Genk (Belgium)	4 - 0	(Indonesia) Pro Duta	Italy
15:00 CET	Sory Kaba 30'; Damien Krutzen 42'; Henry Odutayo 47'; Senne Verbiest 63'	Report		Stadium: Stadio Cavanis; Referee: (Italy) Simiele

7 February 2015 Group 5	Inter Milan (Italy)	2 - 0	(Indonesia) Pro Duta	Italy
15:00 CET	Federico Dimarco 56' (pen.); Andrea Palazzi 78'	Report		Stadium: Stadio Buon Riposo; Referee: (Italy) Gariglio

=== Local Friendly Matches ===
24 January 2015 Friendly	Perserang Serang (Indonesia)	1 - 0	(Indonesia) Pro Duta	Tangerang, Indonesia
				Stadium: SPH Karawaci Field

25 January 2015 Friendly	Pro Duta (Indonesia)	3 - 2	(Indonesia) Barito Putra	Tangerang, Indonesia
				Stadium: SGU BSD-City Field

16 April 2015 Friendly	Pro Duta (Indonesia)	1 - 1	(Indonesia) PSBL Langsa	Medan, Indonesia
	Fiwi Dwipan 75'			Stadium: T.D. Pardede Field

==== Pangdam I/BB Cup 2015 ====
29 March 2015 Group B	PSAD Bukit Barisan (Indonesia)	1 - 0	(Indonesia) Pro Duta	Medan, Indonesia
16:15 UTC+7	Bambang 9'	Report		Stadium: Teladan Stadium

31 March 2015 Group B	Pro Duta (Indonesia)	0 - 2	(Indonesia) Bintang Jaya Asahan	Medan, Indonesia
19:00 UTC+7		Report	Wiganda Pradika 32'; Kiki Lussianto 74'	Stadium: Teladan Stadium

2 April 2015 Group B	Pro Duta (Indonesia)	0 - 0	(Indonesia) Persiraja Banda Aceh	Medan, Indonesia
19:00 UTC+7				Stadium: Teladan Stadium
