= Ficano =

Ficano is an Italian surname. Notable people with the surname include:

- Nicola Ficano (born 1987), Italian footballer
- Robert A. Ficano (born 1952), American politician

== See also ==
- Fiano (disambiguation)
