= 2006–07 in Italian football =

The 2006–07 season was the 105th season of competitive football in Italy.

== Overview ==
The look of Italian football in the first divisions took on major changes as a result of the Calciopoli scandal. It saw 29 time Serie A champions Juventus relegated from the top division to the second division Serie B for the first time in the club's history.

Fiorentina and Lazio began the season in Serie A with deductions of 15 points and 3 points respectively. Milan were given an 8-point deduction, but played in the Champions League after defeating Red Star Belgrade in the third qualifying round.

Catania made their first appearance in Serie A since 1984 after being promoted from Serie B.

Val di Sangro play their first season of professional football in Italy, after being promoted from Serie D to Serie C2.

== Events ==
- 22 July 2006 – Claudio Gentile's contract as coach of the Italian U21 national team is not renewed.
- 24 July 2006 – Former Lazio and Juventus forward Pierluigi Casiraghi is named coach of the Italian U21 national team. Gianfranco Zola will act as Casiraghi's technical consultant.
- 25 July 2006 – After appeals were heard in the 2006 Italian football scandal, all penalties were reduced. Juventus will play in Serie B with a 17-point deduction, Lazio and Fiorentina are back in Serie A with 11 and 19-point reductions, and Milan will also stay in Serie A with an 8-point deduction.
- 17 August 2006 – Further penalties in the ongoing scandal were handed out. Reggina will start the Serie A season with a 15-point deduction. Arezzo will start the Serie B season with a 9-point deduction.
- 26 August 2006 – On appeal, Arezzo's penalty of a 9-point deduction was reduced to 6 points.
- 26 August 2006 – After going behind by 3 goals early in the Super Cup, Inter come back to defeat Roma, 4–3 after extra time.
- 30 August 2006 – Fixture lists for the upcoming season in Serie A and Serie B are released.
- 7 September 2006 – Torino coach Gianni De Biasi is sacked three days before the start of the season. Alberto Zaccheroni is the new coach.
- 9 September 2006 – Serie A and Serie B seasons begin.
- 19 September 2006 – Guido Rossi resigns as commissioner of the FIGC.
- 20 September 2006 – Luca Pancalli is appointed commissioner of the FIGC.
- 20 September 2006 – Francesco Flachi of Sampdoria and Moris Carrozzieri of Atalanta receive two-month bans as a result of a betting inquiry. The two players were accused of "trying to obtain information on the final result of some football matches, in order to allow third parties to place their bets and be sure to win".
- 9 October 2006 – Pescara sack coach Davide Ballardini.
- 10 October 2006 – The Italian U21 team defeats Spain 2–1 to reach the UEFA U-21 Championships.
- 11 October 2006 – Pescara appoint Aldo Ammazzalorso as new coach.
- 16 October 2006 – Chievo sack coach Giuseppe Pillon and name former coach Luigi Delneri as his replacement.
- 19 October 2006 – Siena are given a one-point deduction for a delay in payment of social security contributions.
- 27 October 2006 – After further appeals in the 2006 Serie A scandal, Juventus had their point penalty reduced from −17 to −9. Lazio had their penalty cut from −11 to −3. Fiorentina had their penalty cut from −19 to −15.
- 30 October 2006 – Serie C1 club Grosseto name Antonello Cuccureddu coach after sacking Massimiliano Allegri.
- 31 October 2006 – Arezzo sack coach Antonio Conte. Maurizio Sarri was named as his replacement.
- 8 November 2006 – The Italian Youth championship will be named after deceased Inter president Giacinto Facchetti.
- 13 November 2006 – Ascoli sack coach Attilio Tesser.
- 14 November 2006 – Ascoli appoint Nedo Sonetti as new coach.
- 27 November 2006 – Italian and Real Madrid defender Fabio Cannavaro is named European Footballer of the Year.
- 28 November 2006 – Genoa striker Giuseppe Sculli is handed an eight-month ban after a match-fixing episode called Caso Genoa.
- 12 December 2006 – Reggina have their penalty cut from 15 to 11 points in further appeals for their part in the 2006 Serie A scandal.
- 12 December 2006 – Pescara sack coach Aldo Luigi Ammazzalorso. Assistant coach Vincenzo Vivarini takes over on an interim basis.
- 17 December 2006 – Cagliari sack coach Marco Giampaolo.
- 18 December 2006 – Fabio Cannavaro is named FIFA World Player of the Year for 2006.
- 19 December 2006 – Franco Colomba is appointed coach of Cagliari.
- 23 December 2006 – Verona sack coach Massimo Ficcadenti, and replace him with Giampiero Ventura.
- 6 January 2007 – Marcello Lippi and all 23 player from Italy's 2006 World Cup winning squad have been given the title of Cavaliere, an Italian OBE, by Italian President Giorgio Napolitano.
- 14 January 2007 – Livorno sack coach Daniele Arrigoni.
- 16 January 2007 – Udinese sack coach Giovanni Galeone and appoint Alberto Malesani as his replacement.
- 16 January 2007 – After being sacked two days earlier, Livorno coach Daniele Arrigoni has been reinstated as coach of the club.
- 17 January 2007 – Luigi De Rosa is appointed coach of Pescara, with Vincenzo Vivarini going back at his previous assistant coach position.
- 30 January 2007 – Messina sack coach Bruno Giordano and appoint Alberto Cavasin as his replacement.
- 2 February 2007 – All the Italian league fixtures, including Serie A and B, have been suspended indefinitely due to riots after a match between Palermo and Catania lead to the death of a policeman. Italy's match against Romania and the Italy U21 match against Belgium have also been called off.
- 11 February 2007 – Crotone sack coach Elio Gustinetti and appoint Guido Carboni to replace him.
- 11 February 2007 – Football leagues in Italy restart after events in Catania.
- 12 February 2007 – Parma sack coach Stefano Pioli and appoint Claudio Ranieri to replace him.
- 12 February 2007 – Modena sack coach Daniele Zoratto.
- 13 February 2007 – Bortolo Mutti is appointed coach of Modena.
- 14 February 2007 – Catania are handed a stadium ban until 30 June, and all "home" games for the rest of the season will be played behind closed doors.
- 22 February 2007 – Francesco Flachi of Sampdoria is indefinitely suspended by the Football Federation after having failed a drugs test for cocaine.
- 26 February 2007 – Torino sack coach Alberto Zaccheroni and recall Gianni De Biasi, fired three days before the start of the season, to replace him.
- 26 February 2007 – Cagliari sack coach Franco Colomba and recall Marco Giampaolo, fired two months earlier, to replace him.
- 26 February 2007 – Bari sack coach Rolando Maran and appoint Giuseppe Materazzi as his replacement.
- 26 February 2007 – Triestina sack coach Andrea Agostinelli and appoint Franco Varrella as his replacement.
- 27 February 2007 – Brescia sack coach Mario Somma.
- 28 February 2007 – Serse Cosmi is appointed coach of Brescia.
- 12 March 2007 – Messina goalkeeper Nicholas Caglioni is indefinitely suspended by the Football Federation after having failed a drugs test for cocaine.
- 13 March 2007 – Arezzo sack coach Maurizio Sarri and reappoint Antonio Conte, replaced by Sarri himself in October, to replace him.
- 21 March 2007 – Livorno sack coach Daniele Arrigoni and appoint Fernando Orsi to replace him.
- 2 April 2007 – Giancarlo Abete is unanimously elected president of FIGC.
- 2 April 2007 – Messina sack coach Alberto Cavasin and recall Bruno Giordano, fired two months earlier, to replace him.
- 2 April 2007 – Italy are named as World Team of the Year at the Laureus Awards.
- 3 April 2007 – Brescia president Gino Corioni is suspended for six months for confronting a referee after a match against Mantova.
- 22 April 2007 – A 2–1 away win to Siena at Stadio Artemio Franchi clinches the scudetto for Inter, with five matches remaining in the season.
- 23 April 2007 – Palermo sack coach Francesco Guidolin and appoint assistant manager Renzo Gobbo and youth team coach Rosario Pergolizzi as caretakers for the five remaining Serie A matches.
- 23 April 2007 – Messina sack Bruno Giordano for a second time in the season, and replace him with Bruno Bolchi.
- 6 May 2007 – Following their defeats respectively to Torino and Inter Milan, Ascoli and Messina are mathematically relegated to Serie B.
- 9 May 2007 – Ravenna are the first team to be promoted to Serie B.
- 12 May 2007 – Pescara are mathematically relegated to Serie C1.
- 13 May 2007 – Grosseto are promoted to Serie B.
- 14 May 2007 – With only two remaining matchdays to the end of the Serie A league, Palermo sack Renzo Gobbo and Rosario Pergolizzi, reappointing Francesco Guidolin at the helm of the team.
- 19 May 2007 – With three remaining matchdays at the end of the season, Juventus are the first team to be promoted to Serie A, and Crotone is mathematically relegated to Serie C1.
- 20 May 2007 – Fiorentina, Empoli and Palermo are mathematically qualified to the 2007–08 UEFA Cup in advance of a matchday.
- 22 May 2007 – UEFA announce that Atalanta will not be able to enter the Intertoto Cup after failing to receive a licence.
- 22 May 2007 – Bologna President Alfredo Cazzola has been suspended from any football activity until 30 November after a protest during a recent match.
- 26 May 2007 – Didier Deschamps resigned from his Juventus head coaching post.
- 27 May 2007 – The last Serie A 2006-07 day is played, with Chievo relegated following a 2–0 dramatic defeat to Catania.
- 29 May 2007 – Juventus appoints assistant coach Giancarlo Corradini as caretaker for the two final Serie B league matches.

== National teams ==
=== Italy national football team ===
Italy won the 2006 FIFA World Cup in a penalty shootout against France on 9 July 2006.

==== 2006 FIFA World Cup ====
===== Group stage =====
| Pos | Team | Pld | W | D | L | GF | GA | GD | Pts | Qualification |
|---|---|---|---|---|---|---|---|---|---|---|
| 1 | Italy | 3 | 2 | 1 | 0 | 5 | 1 | +4 | 7 | Advance to knockout stage |
| 2 | Ghana | 3 | 2 | 0 | 1 | 4 | 3 | +1 | 6 | Advance to knockout stage |
| 3 | Czech Republic | 3 | 1 | 0 | 2 | 3 | 4 | −1 | 3 | |
| 4 | United States | 3 | 0 | 1 | 2 | 2 | 6 | −4 | 1 | |

Source: FIFA
Rules for classification: Tie-breaking criteria

| 12 June 2006 2006 FIFA World Cup | Italy | 2–0 | Ghana | Hanover, Germany |
| 21:00 CEST (UTC+02:00) | Pirlo 40'; Iaquinta 83' | Report | | Stadium: AWD-Arena; Attendance: 43,000; Referee: Carlos Eugênio Simon (Brazil) |

| 17 June 2006 2006 FIFA World Cup | Italy | 1–1 | United States | Kaiserslautern, Germany |
| 21:00 CEST (UTC+02:00) | Gilardino 22' | Report | Zaccardo 27' (o.g.) | Stadium: Fritz-Walter-Stadion; Attendance: 46,000; Referee: Jorge Larrionda (Uruguay) |

| 22 June 2006 2006 FIFA World Cup | Czech Republic | 0–2 | Italy | Hamburg, Germany |
| 16:00 CEST (UTC+02:00) | | Report | Materazzi 26'; Inzaghi 87' | Stadium: FIFA World Cup Stadium, Hamburg; Attendance: 50,000; Referee: Benito Archundia (Mexico) |

===== Round of 16 =====
| 26 June 2006 2006 FIFA World Cup | Italy | 1–0 | Australia | Kaiserslautern, Germany |
| 17:00 CEST (UTC+02:00) | Totti 90+5' (pen.) | Report | | Stadium: Fritz-Walter-Stadion; Attendance: 46,000; Referee: Luis Medina Cantalejo (Spain) |

===== Quarter-final =====
| 30 June 2006 2006 FIFA World Cup | Italy | 3–0 | Ukraine | Hamburg, Germany |
| 21:00 CEST (UTC+02:00) | Zambrotta 6'; Toni 59', 69' | Report | | Stadium: FIFA World Cup Stadium, Hamburg; Attendance: 50,000; Referee: Frank De Bleeckere (Belgium) |

===== Semi-final =====
| 4 July 2006 2006 FIFA World Cup | Germany | 0–2 | Italy | Dortmund, Germany |
| 21:00 CEST (UTC+02:00) | | Report | Grosso 119'; Del Piero 120+1' | Stadium: FIFA World Cup Stadium, Dortmund; Attendance: 65,000; Referee: Benito Archundia (Mexico) |

===== Final =====
| 9 July 2006 2006 FIFA World Cup | Italy | 1–1 (a.e.t.) (5–3 p) | France | Berlin, Germany |
| 20:00 CEST (UTC+02:00) | Materazzi 19' | Report | Zidane 7' (pen.) | Stadium: Olympiastadion; Attendance: 69,000; Referee: Horacio Elizondo (Argentina) |
| | Penalties |
| | Pirlo (penalty scored); Materazzi (penalty scored); De Rossi (penalty scored); Del Piero (penalty scored); Grosso (penalty scored) | | (penalty scored) Wiltord; (penalty missed) Trezeguet; (penalty scored) Abidal; (penalty scored) Sagnol |

==== UEFA Euro 2008 qualifying ====
| Pos | Team | Pld | W | D | L | GF | GA | GD | Pts | Qualification |
|---|---|---|---|---|---|---|---|---|---|---|
| 1 | Italy | 12 | 9 | 2 | 1 | 22 | 9 | +13 | 29 | Qualify for final tournament |
| 2 | France | 12 | 8 | 2 | 2 | 25 | 5 | +20 | 26 | Qualify for final tournament |
| 3 | Scotland | 12 | 8 | 0 | 4 | 21 | 12 | +9 | 24 | |
| 4 | Ukraine | 12 | 5 | 2 | 5 | 18 | 16 | +2 | 17 | |
| 5 | Lithuania | 12 | 5 | 1 | 6 | 11 | 13 | −2 | 16 | |
| 6 | Georgia | 12 | 3 | 1 | 8 | 16 | 19 | −3 | 10 | |
| 7 | Faroe Islands | 12 | 0 | 0 | 12 | 4 | 43 | −39 | 0 | |

Rules for classification: Qualification tiebreakers

| 2 September 2006 UEFA Euro 2008 qualifying | Italy | 1–1 | Lithuania | Naples, Italy |
| 20:50 CEST (UTC+02:00) | Inzaghi 30' | Report | Danilevičius 21' | Stadium: Stadio San Paolo; Attendance: 60,000; Referee: Martin Hansson (Sweden) |

| 6 September 2006 UEFA Euro 2008 qualifying | France | 3–1 | Italy | Saint-Denis, France |
| 21:00 CEST (UTC+02:00) | Govou 2', 55'; Henry 18' | Report | Gilardino 20' | Stadium: Stade de France; Attendance: 78,800; Referee: Herbert Fandel (Germany) |

| 7 October 2006 UEFA Euro 2008 qualifying | Italy | 2–0 | Ukraine | Rome, Italy |
| 20:50 CEST (UTC+02:00) | Oddo 71' (pen.); Toni 79' | Report | | Stadium: Stadio Olimpico; Attendance: 49,149; Referee: Kyros Vassaras (Greece) |

| 28 March 2007 UEFA Euro 2008 qualifying | Italy | 2–0 | Scotland | Bari, Italy |
| 20:50 CEST (UTC+02:00) | Toni 12', 70' | Report | | Stadium: Stadio San Nicola; Attendance: 37,500; Referee: Frank De Bleeckere (Belgium) |

==== Friendlies ====
| 2 June 2006 International friendly | Italy | 0–0 | Ukraine | Lausanne, Switzerland |
| 20:50 CEST (UTC+02:00) | | Report | | Stadium: Stade olympique de la Pontaise; Attendance: 14,000; Referee: Markus Nobs (Switzerland) |

| 16 August 2006 International friendly | Italy | 0–2 | Croatia | Livorno, Italy |
| 20:50 CEST (UTC+02:00) | | Report | Eduardo 28'; Modrić 42' | Stadium: Stadio Armando Picchi; Attendance: 16,150; Referee: Knut Kircher (Germany) |

| 15 November 2006 International friendly | Italy | 1–1 | Turkey | Bergamo, Italy |
| 20:50 CET (UTC+01:00) | Di Natale 29' | Report | Materazzi 42' (o.g.) | Stadium: Stadio Atleti Azzurri d'Italia; Attendance: 24,386; Referee: Massimo Busacca (Switzerland) |

== Honours ==
| Competition | Winner |
|---|---|
| Serie A | Inter |
| Coppa Italia | Roma |
| Serie B | Juventus |
| Serie C1/A | Grosseto |
| Serie C1/B | Ravenna |
| Serie C2/A | Legnano |
| Serie C2/B | Foligno |
| Serie C2/C | Sorrento |
| Coppa Italia Serie C | Foggia |
| Serie D | Round A: Canavese; Round B: Tempio; Round C: Mezzocorona; Round D: Rodengo Saiano; Round E: Esperia Viareggio; Round F: Valle del Giovenco; Round G: Scafatese; Round H: Noicattaro; Round I: Sangiuseppese |
| Eccellenza Regionale | see Eccellenza 2006–07 |
| Italian Super Cup | Inter |

== Deaths ==
- Giacinto Facchetti, 64, president of Inter.
- Alessio Ferramosca and Riccardo Neri, both 17, Juventus youth players.
- Pietro Rava, 90, last remaining Italy 1938 FIFA World Cup winner.
- Sandro Salvadore, 67, Juventus and Italy defender.
- Benito "Veleno" Lorenzi, 81, Internazionale and Italy striker.
- Paolo De Luca, 64, Siena chairman.
