= Akeem Omolade =

Nigerian footballer (1983–2022)

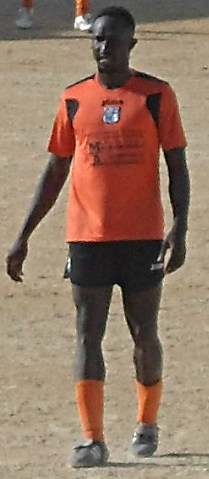
- Omolade in 2012

Personal information
- Full name: Akeem Oluwashegun Omolade
- Date of birth: 4 March 1983
- Place of birth: Kaduna, Nigeria
- Date of death: 13 June 2022 (aged 39)
- Place of death: Palermo, Italy
- Height: 1.76 m (5 ft 9 in)
- Position: Striker

Youth career
- Treviso

Senior career*
Years	Team	Apps	(Gls)
2000–2001	Treviso	3	(1)
2001–2003	Torino	5	(0)
2003–2004	Novara	18	(4)
2004–2005	Biellese	10	(2)
2005–2006	Reggiana	11	(0)
2006–2008	Gela	34	(2)
2008–2009	Barletta	10	(2)
2009–2010	Vibonese	26	(6)
2011–2012	Mazara	?	(6)
2012–2013	Ribera 1954	20	(6)
2013–2014	Mazara	3	(0)
2014–2015	Borgata Terrenove		
2016–2017	Altofonte		
- * Club domestic league appearances and goals

Akeem Oluwashegun Omolade (4 March 1983 – 13 June 2022) was a Nigerian professional footballer.

== Career ==
Omolade arrived in Italy at the age of 17, joining Treviso, with whom he made his professional debut in the Serie B league. He subsequently joined Torino, with whom he made his Serie A debut.

Following his departure from Torino, he went on to play a career in the lower leagues of Italian football.

In 2011, he moved to Sicily to join Mazara. In 2012, he played for Ribera 1954 in Serie D, before returning to Mazara in 2013.

In 2014, he went down even further, joining Marsala-based Promozione club Borgata Terrenove.

Omolade died on 13 June 2022, at the age of 39.
