= USD Mazara =

Italian football club

Mazara
- Full name: Unione Sportiva Dilettantistica Mazara
- Nicknames: I Gialloblù (The Yellow-and-Blues); I Canarini (The Canaries)
- Founded: 1946 (U.S. Mazara); 1996 (merger)
- Ground: Stadio Nino Vaccara, Mazara del Vallo, Italy
- Capacity: 3,266
- Chairman: Salvatore Asaro
- Head coach: Filippo Cavataio
- League: Promozione Sicily
- 2024–25: Promozione Sicily/A, 11th
Home colours	Away colours

Unione Sportiva Dilettantistica Mazara, commonly known just as Mazara, is an Italian football team from Mazara del Vallo, Sicily. They currently play in the amateur Promozione league.

== History ==
=== Foundation and early years ===
Mazara was founded in 1946. However, a team representing Mazara del Vallo — Unione Sportiva Mazara' — was not founded until 1957–1958. Initially, the team played in the Promozione league. They played in Serie D from 1960 to 1961 but were relegated three years later. The club played in Serie D from 1971 to 1972 before they were relegated again. They returned to play in Serie D in 1976–1977 after winning a promotion playoff to Canicattì 1–0. The playoff match took place at Stadio Renzo Barbera, Palermo, attended by 12,000 people, the majority of whom were Mazara supporters. Following the promotion, the club consecutively played in Serie D for 19 seasons.

=== Promotion attempts ===
During the 1980s and early 1990s, Mazara often aimed to win the Serie D league but always missed their goal. In 1985, coach Ignazio Arcoleo led Mazara to win Serie D, so they were planned to be promoted to Serie C2, but the Football Federation later cancelled the promotion because of alleged match-fixing, and Mazara's bitter rivals Trapanis were promoted in their place. Mazara narrowly missed promotion on several occasions: the club placed second in 1988–1989, just one point behind winners Acireale; in 1990–1991, third behind Gangi, who then lost the playoff match to Matera; in 1993–1994, seventh after having led the point count for almost the whole first half of the season.

=== Relegation, decline and merger ===
First logo of the club after the 1996 fusion

After nineteen Serie D seasons, Mazara encountered serious financial troubles. In 1994–1995, they were relegated to Eccellenza, where another local team, S.C. Mazara 2000, was already playing. Mazara 2000 was a minor, young team that quickly climbed the football pyramid to Eccellenza. Mazara proper appeared to be an old team under decline. Both teams played in Eccellenza in 1995–1996, challenging each other in a local derby. Mazara placed fourth at the end of the season, whereas Mazara 2000 obtained seventh place. Mazara, under growing economic difficulties, agreed to merge with Mazara 2000. The merged team's name was Gruppo Sportivo Mazara 1946 (Mazara 1946 Sports Group).

The new football team included almost all the best players from the two former local clubs. Their first season in 1996–1997 was very successful, winning Eccellenza hands down and returning to Serie D. The first season for the new club in the Italian fifth-ranked division ended with just Mazara earning one point above the relegation limit. The 1998–1999 campaign was even harder. Since Mazara ended the season with the same number of points as Sancataldese, they were forced to play a single-legged relegation playoff. Held in Termini Imerese, the match ended in a 1–0 win for Mazara, which escaped relegation again.

Affected by heavy financial struggles, Mazara's team comprised young and inexperienced players in the 1999–2000 Serie D season. They were relegated to Eccellenza with just 8 points in 34 matches, placed last in number of points in the league.

Mazara experienced a period of decline. It was relegated to the Promozione (7th-ranked division) in 2003–2004 after losing relegation playoffs to Licata. With a new property, the club returned to Eccellenza in 2005–2006 under coach Filippo Cavataio, a native of Mazara and a former centre back of several Serie C teams. In 2006–2007, the club, again coached by Cavataio, ended the regular season phase in third place, behind Alcamo and Carini. They were admitted to the promotion playoff semifinal, where they eliminated Kamarat (from Cammarata) in a one-legged semifinal after a 0–0 tie. Mazara moved to the next round because of their best placement in the regular season. However, another tie with second-placed Carini in the final caused Mazara to be eliminated. Mazara failed to receive promotion in the following season, finishing in fifth place after a long battle with Nissa and bitter rivals Trapani, who then defeated and eliminated Mazara in the following promotion play-off tournament. All three matches (two in the regular season, plus a one-legged play-off match) against Trapani were played behind closed doors.

In 2008–09, Mazara returned, expecting to win the league, and established themselves in the top positions of the league. However, in January 2009, the club unwillingly gained national news coverage due to a key home game against first-placed Villabate. Mazara striker Francesco Erbini scored a goal in the first minutes of the match, but the referee disallowed the goal and restarted the game as Mazara's players were celebrating, thus allowing Villabate to score a goal with no significant opposition on the pitch. Due to heavy protests, the referee sent off three Mazara footballers in succession and abandoned the pitch minutes later. The Sicilian Football Federation then announced that the match was to be replayed on 10 March; Mazara won the game 2–0 and established themselves in first place. On 22 March, after a 4–0 home win against Marsala in a local derby, Mazara mathematically ensured first place in the league table. They had a six-point advantage over Villabate and only one remaining match to be played, marking their return to the Serie D after nine years.

=== Serie D and fusion ===
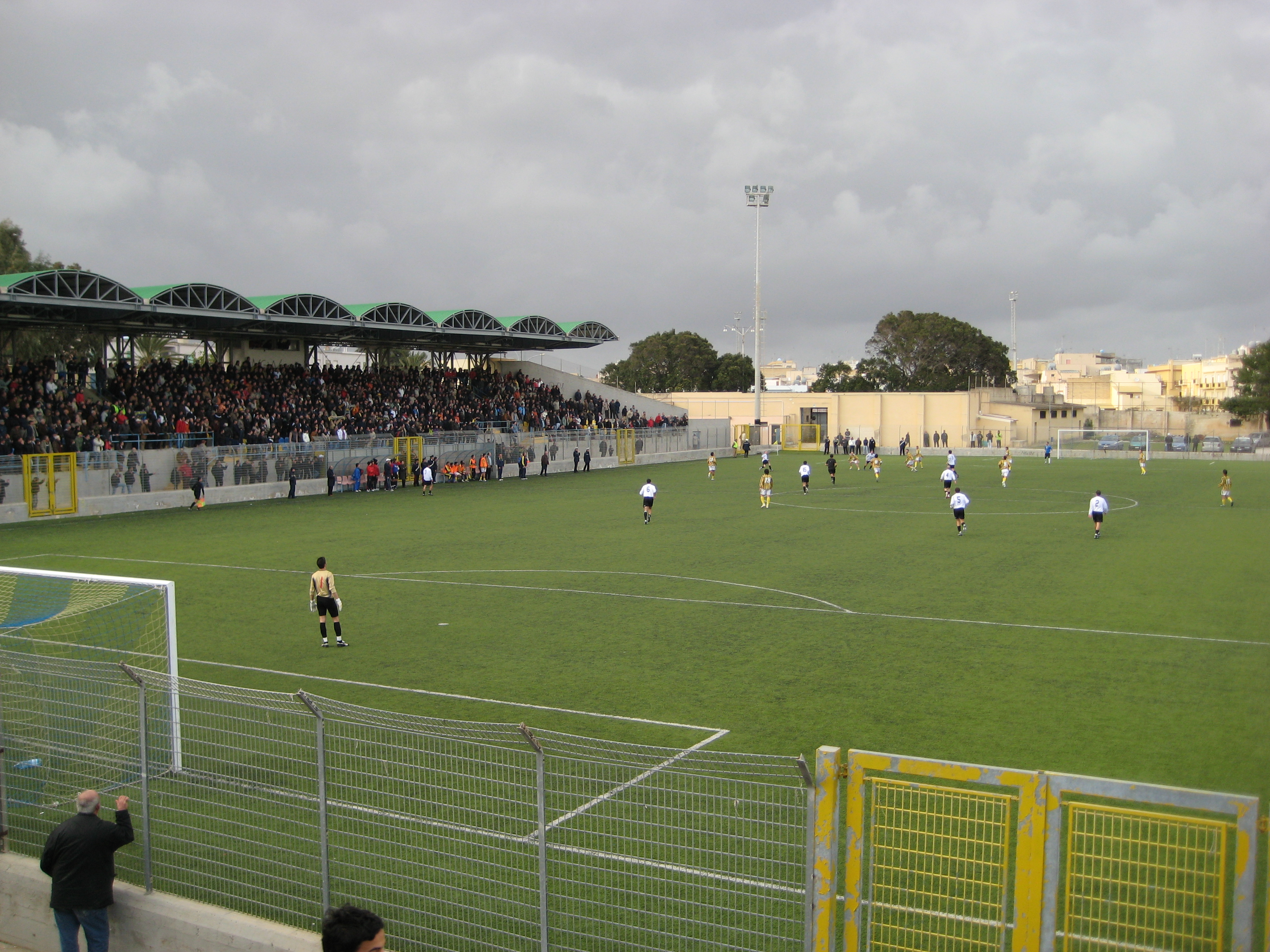
Mazara 1946 during a home match in 2009

The club's comeback season to Serie D was hailed by financial problems, mostly caused by the move from a regional league to a national one. Former player Giovanni Iacono was appointed head coach on an unusual part-time basis. Throughout the season, Mazara found themselves at the bottom side of the league despite managing to achieve some prominent results, such as home wins to fallen giants Messina, and arch-rivals and league leaders Trapani. The club also experienced the loss of former Palermo striker and its team captain, Francesco Erbini. He was banned from the league for ten months in February 2010 because he greeted two club staff members under criminal investigation. Despite these issues, the club ended the season above the relegation playoff zone, ensuring that they would play in the next Serie D season. In July 2010, a fusion was announced between the main Mazara club and the historical local youth system club Aurora Mazara. The new club took the name Mazara Calcio A.S.D.

Mazara successfully returned to Serie D in 2010 as Eccellenza Sicily champions and played two seasons. They were relegated in 2011 as second-last placed in the Round I of the top amateur league in Italy. In their first season back in Eccellenza, Mazara clearly stated their intent to return immediately to Serie D by acquiring several top players, including former Torino striker Akeem Omolade. Despite several attempts, the club suffered difficult times. The 2013–14 season was particularly disastrous: Mazara narrowly escaped relegation through playoffs, which were decided by a last-minute extra-time draw against Rocca di Caprileone.

For the 2014–15 season, Mazara appointed Nicola Terranova, former assistant coach and older brother of Serie A defender Emanuele Terranova, as the new head coach. The club ended the season in second place behind winners Marsala. Qualifying for the national playoff phase, they were eliminated in the finals by Apulia-based club Nardò.

The 2015–16 season started with Terranova again at the team's helm. A Palermo-based consortium took over the club. New leader Elio Abbagnato (former club chairman from 1989 to 1991, and father-in-law of former Italy international Federico Balzaretti) appointed former Serie A player Tommaso Napoli as Mazara's new manager. Playing in Eccellenza, the club ended in seventh place. Mazara had a very successful campaign in the Coppa Italia Dilettanti, winning the regional cup for the first time. They ended the national phase, which offered an additional Serie D spot to the competition winners, as runners-up, losing to Unione Sanremo in the final.

In the new season, Andrea Pensabene became the new head coach, replacing Mazara-born Giacomo Modica in September. In November 2016, Abbagnato sold the club to managing director Filippo Franzone.

The club changed ownership again in 2019, sold by Palermo-based Franzone to a local consortium. In 2023, the club was renamed U.S.D. Mazara. Mazara were relegated by the end of the 2023–24 season, finishing dead last in the Group A of the Eccellenza Sicily league. The club was successively acquired by Salvatore Asaro, a former player for the club, who also initially served as head coach in the club's 2024–25 Promozione campaign, which eventually ended with the club escaping a second consecutive relegation just on the final game of the season.

== Colours and badge ==
The official team colours for every major sports team in Mazara are canary yellow and blue, which are also the official colours of Mazara del Vallo.

Mazara's original team badge was reminiscent of the 1996 merger between the two local and rival clubs U.S. Mazara and S.C. Mazara 2000. Both two characteristic elements of the respective original crests, respectively the canary bird and the seahorse, were present on it, along with the words "GS MAZARA 1946". That logo was dropped in 2010 in favour of a new version depicting only the canary.

== Stadium ==
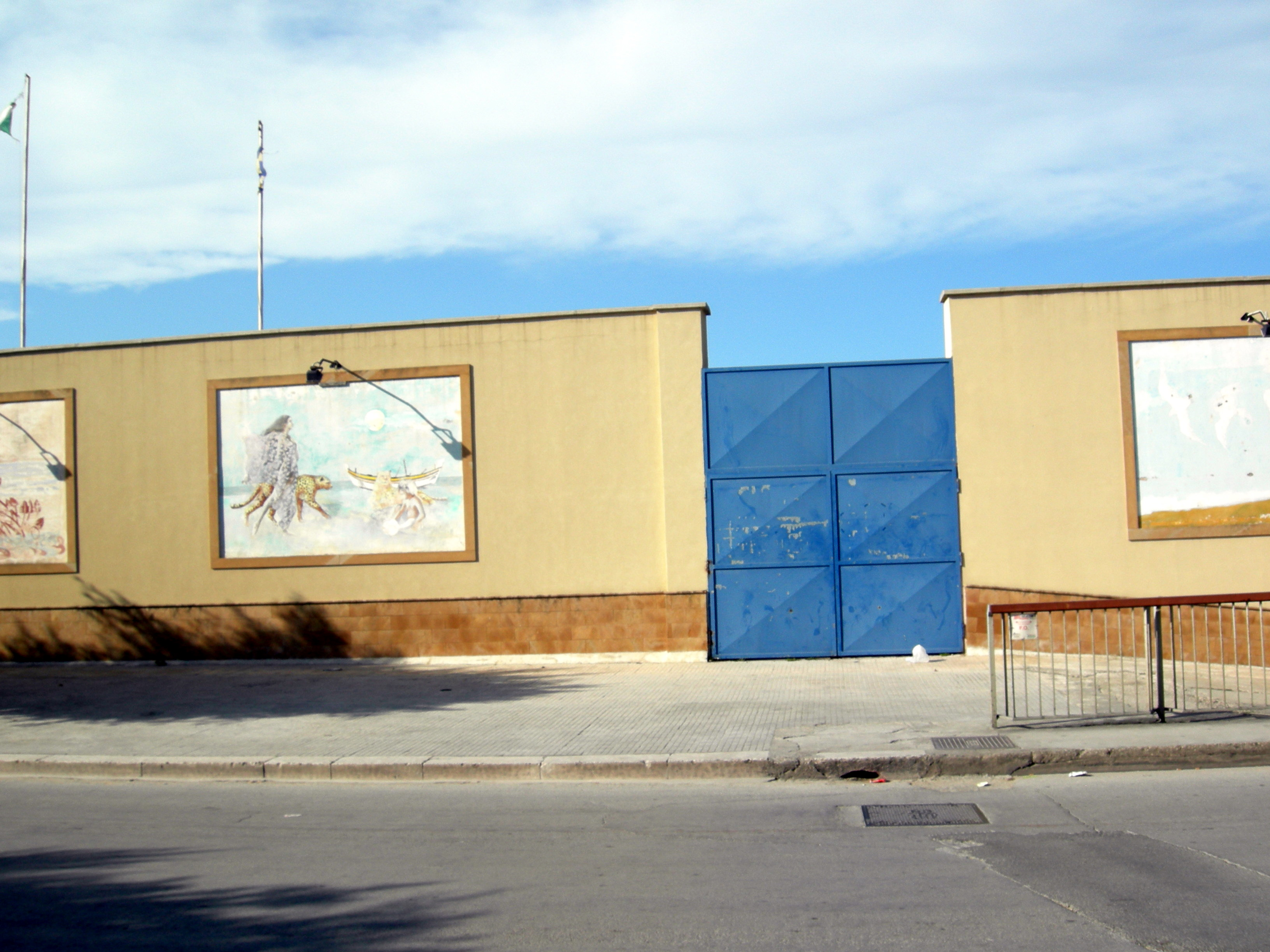
Entrance of Stadio Nino Vaccara, Mazara del Vallo

Mazara plays its home matches at Stadio Nino Vaccara, a small stadium along the local Mazaro river. Originally a dirt floor stadium without seats, Stadio Nino Vaccara undertook a massive restructuring in the early 2000s, implementing a synthetic field and a numbered seats-only grandstand with a roof.

The stadium is divided into three sectors: the numbered grandstand (tribuna centrale) with a capacity of 1,086; the curva (not a curved sector), where organized supporters sit down, with a capacity of 800; and the gradinata in front of the grandstand, with a capacity of 1,380, usually opened in exceptional cases.

Outside the stadium, right beside the main entrance, murals depict fishermen and fishing boats characteristic of Mazara del Vallo.

== List of seasons ==
Season	League	Placement	Other
1956–57	Prima Divisione	5th	
1957–58	Prima Divisione	1st	promoted
1958–59	Prima Categoria	7th	
1959–60	Prima Categoria	1st	promoted after playoff against Milazzo
1960–61	Serie D	10th	
1961–62	Serie D	7th	
1962–63	Serie D	8th	
1963–64	Serie D	17th	relegated
1964–65	Prima Categoria	7th	
1965–66	Prima Categoria	11th	
1966–67	Prima Categoria	15th	
1967–68	Prima Categoria	7th	
1968–69	Prima Categoria	2nd	
1969–70	Prima Categoria	1st	6 points later deducted because of match fixing, AMAT Palermo promoted at its place
1970–71	Promozione	1st	promoted
1971–72	Serie D	17th	relegated
1972–73	Promozione	2nd	
1973–74	Promozione	3rd	
1974–75	Promozione	3rd	
1975–76	Promozione	1st	promoted after playoff against Canicattì
1976–77	Serie D	7th	
1977–78	Serie D	10th	
1978–79	Serie D	12th	
1979–80	Serie D	8th	
1980–81	Serie D	18th	2 points deducted; no relegations in that season
1981–82	Serie D	14th	
1982–83	Interregionale	12th	
1983–84	Interregionale	8th	
1984–85	Interregionale	1st	5 points later deducted because of match fixing, Trapani promoted in their place
1985–86	Interregionale	11th	
1986–87	Interregionale	7th	
1987–88	Interregionale	12th	
1988–89	Interregionale]]	2nd	
1989–90	Interregionale	6th	
1990–91	Interregionale	3rd	
1991–92	Interregionale	4th	
1992–93	Campionato Nazionale Dilettanti	14th	
1993–94	Campionato Nazionale Dilettanti	7th	
1994–95	Campionato Nazionale Dilettanti	17th	relegated
1995–96	Eccellenza	4th	merged with Mazara 2000 at the end of the season
1996–97	Eccellenza	1st	promoted
1997–98	Campionato Nazionale Dilettanti	14th	
1998–99	Campionato Nazionale Dilettanti	14th	saved from relegation after playoff against Sancataldese
1999–00	Campionato Nazionale Dilettanti	18th	relegated
2000–01	Eccellenza	6th	
2001–02	Eccellenza	7th	
2002–03	Eccellenza	3rd	
2003–04	Eccellenza	13th	relegated after playoff against Licata
2004–05	Promozione	5th	
2005–06	Promozione	1st	promoted
2006–07	Eccellenza	3rd	
2007–08	Eccellenza	5th	
2008–09	Eccellenza	1st	promoted
2009–10	Serie D	12th	
2010–11	Serie D	18th	relegated
2011–12	Eccellenza	9th	
2012–13	Eccellenza	10th	
2013–14	Eccellenza	13th	
2014–15	Eccellenza	2nd	lost national playoff finals to Nardò
2015–16	Eccellenza	7th	Coppa Italia Dilettanti Sicilia winners, Coppa Italia Dilettanti runners-up after losing to Sanremese in the final
2016–17	Eccellenza	9th	
2017–18	Eccellenza	6th	
2018–19	Eccellenza	8th	
2019–20	Eccellenza	6th	
2020–21	Eccellenza	3rd	
2021–22	Eccellenza	9th	
2022–23	Eccellenza	7th	
2023–24	Eccellenza	16th	relegated
2024–25	Promozione	11th	

== Notable managers ==
- (Italy) Ignazio Arcoleo (Palermo coach in the 1990s)
- (Italy) Giuseppe Caramanno (Palermo and Foggia coach in the 1990s)
- (Czechoslovakia) Čestmír Vycpálek (Juventus coach in the 1970s)

== Achievements ==
- Serie D:
  - Runners-up (2): 1984–1985, 1988–1989
- Coppa Italia Dilettanti:
  - Runners-up (1): 2015–2016
- Coppa Italia Dilettanti Sicilia:
  - Winners (1): 2015–2016
- Eccellenza Sicilia:
  - Winners (2): 1996–1997, 2008–2009
- Promozione Sicilia:
  - Winners (3): 1970–1971, 1975–1976, 2005–2006
  - Runners-up (1): 1972–1973
