= Ivo Banella =

Italian footballer

Personal information
- Date of birth: 29 September 1953 (age 73)
- Place of birth: Castiglione del Lago, Italy
- Position: Striker

Senior career*
Years	Team	Apps	(Gls)
1971–1973	Roma	1	(0)
1973–1974	Legnano	21	(1)
1974–1978	Trapani	112	(21)
1978–1979	Gallipoli	27	(3)
1979–1981	Latina	58	(9)
- * Club domestic league appearances and goals

Ivo Banella (born 29 September 1953 in Castiglione del Lago) is a retired Italian football player.

His debut professional game in the 1971/72 season for A.S. Roma remained his only Serie A game.
