= Umberto Pinardi =

Italian footballer and manager (1928–2025)

Personal information
- Date of birth: 22 May 1928
- Place of birth: San Martino Sinzano, Collecchio, Italy
- Date of death: 21 June 2025 (aged 97)
- Place of death: Parma, Italy
- Position: Defender

Senior career*
Years	Team	Apps	(Gls)
1946–1947	Dop. Ceretti e Tanfani		
1947–1949	Gallaratese		
1949–1952	Como	92	(7)
1952–1954	Juventus	12	(1)
1954–1956	Udinese	46	(7)
1956–1959	Lazio	61	(1)
1959–1960	Udinese	27	(2)
1960–1961	Como	22	(1)

Managerial career
- 1964–1967: Pisa
- 1968–1969: Massese
- 1969–1970: Ternana
- 1970–1971: Massese
- 1972–1973: Palermo
- 1973–1975: Brescia
- 1975–1976: SPAL
- 1976–1978: Modena
- 1980–1981: Taranto
- 1983–1984: Cavese
- * Club domestic league appearances and goals

Umberto Pinardi (22 May 1928 – 21 June 2025) was an Italian professional football player and coach.

== Life and career ==
Born in San Martino Sinzano, a Collecchio frazione, at young age Pinardi moved to Milan, where he became passionate for football playing in amateur parish clubs. A full-back and centre-half defender, he made his professional debut in 1947, playing in the Serie B club Gallaratese. He made his Serie A debut with Como, and in 1954 he moved to Juventus, where a serious injury compromised his tenure in the club and the rest of his career.

As a football manager, Pinardi started his career in Serie D, and spent most years in Serie B, even having a brief Serie A stint with Palermo. As a coach, he is best remembered for having launched the career of Evaristo Beccalossi at Brescia.

Pinardi died on 21 June 2025, at the age of 97.

== Honours ==
- Coppa Italia winner: 1958
