= Giampiero Vitali =

Italian footballer and manager (1940–2001)

Personal information
- Date of birth: 1 August 1940
- Place of birth: Milan, Italy
- Date of death: 20 May 2001 (aged 60)
- Place of death: Milan, Italy
- Height: 1.76 m (5 ft 9 in)
- Position: Defender

Senior career*
Years	Team	Apps	(Gls)
1959–1962	Fanfulla	44	(3)
1962–1964	Triestina	70	(4)
1964–1966	Lazio	46	(2)
1966–1967	Fiorentina	17	(0)
1967–1968	Brescia	18	(0)
1968–1969	S.P.A.L.	20	(2)
1969–1976	Massese	245	(25)

Managerial career
- 1975–1976: Massese (assistant)
- 1977–1978: Empoli
- 1978: Pisa
- 1979–1981: Lucchese
- 1982–1983: Empoli
- 1983–1984: Perugia
- 1984–1985: Varese
- 1985–1986: Sambenedettese
- 1987: Campobasso
- 1987–1989: Parma
- 1989: Como
- 1991: Empoli
- 1991–1992: Taranto
- 1993–1994: Modena
- 1995: Palermo
- 1996: Pistoiese
- 1997: Palermo
- 1997–2000: Carrarese (technical director)
- 1998: Carrarese (caretaker)
- * Club domestic league appearances and goals

Giampiero Vitali (1 August 1940 — 20 May 2001) was an Italian football defender and later manager. He died in 2001, aged 60, due to an incurable disease.
Overall, as a player, he scored 81 appearances and 2 goals in Serie A with Lazio, Fiorentina and Brescia, 124 appearances and 9 goals in Serie B with Triestina, SPAL and Massese, 255 appearances and 25 goals in Serie C with Fanfulla and Massese. With Massese he obtained a promotion from Serie C to Serie B, still setting the record for matches played in the league with 245 appearances.
When he ceased playing sports, he had twenty years of experience as a coach (to his credit 13 Serie B championships), leading, among other things, Parma for two seasons before the advent of Nevio Scala and Palermo twice. He obtained one admission to the new Serie C1 championship with Empoli (1977-1978 season), a promotion from Serie C1 to Serie B in 1982-1983 always at the lead of Empoli and ended his career at Carrara, in Serie C1, season 1997-1998, when hired as Technical Director, the management asked him to return to coaching (with the team relegated to the last place in the standings), managing to save the Tuscans.
In total, as a professional coach, he directed 539 matches in the league, of which 317 in Serie B, 154 in Serie C1 and 68 in Serie C2. Since 2001, the year of his death, a sporting event has been organized annually in Tuscany in memory of him, which attracts great personalities from the world of sport.
In 2020 the Stadio degli Oliveti in Massa was named after him.
