= Foiano =

Foiano may refer to:

- Fiano (grape), white Italian wine grape variety
- Foiano della Chiana, town in eastern Tuscany, in the province of Arezzo
- Foiano di Val Fortore, municipality in the Province of Benevento in the Italian region of Campania

== See also ==
- Fiano (disambiguation)
