= Giorgio Rumignani =

Italian football player and manager (1939–2025)

Personal information
- Date of birth: 6 December 1939
- Place of birth: Gemona del Friuli, Italy
- Date of death: 21 December 2025 (aged 86)
- Height: 1.83 m (6 ft 0 in)
- Position: Forward

Senior career*
Years	Team	Apps	(Gls)
1956–1957	Portogruaro		
1957–1960	Nuova Valdagno		
1960–1962	Sambenedettese		
1962–1963	Cosenza		
1963–1965	Siena		
1965–1967	Pisa		
1967–1969	Arezzo		
1969–1971	Savona		

Managerial career
- 1973–1975: Lignano
- 1976–1977: Messina
- 1977: Messina
- 1978–1979: Varese
- 1979–1980: Mestre
- 1980–1981: Forli
- 1980–1983: Mestre
- 1983–1984: Teramo
- 1984–1985: Lucchese
- 1985–1986: Teramo
- 1986–1987: Virtus Francavilla
- 1987: Barletta
- 1987–1988: Barletta
- 1988–1989: Palermo
- 1989–1990: Piacenza
- 1990–1992: Sambenedettese
- 1992–1993: Fidelis Andria
- 1993: Pisa
- 1993–1994: Pescara
- 1995–1996: Ravenna
- 1996–1997: Monza
- 1997: Palermo
- 1998–1999: Fidelis Andria
- 1999–2000: Reggiana
- 2000–2001: Ravenna
- 2001–2002: Benevento
- 2002–2003: Arezzo
- 2004: Imolese
- 2004–2005: Fidelis Andria
- 2005: Foggia
- 2009: Sambenedettese
- 2009: Sambenedettese (technical director)
- 2009–2010: Treviso
- * Club domestic league appearances and goals

Giorgio Rumignani (6 December 1939 – 21 December 2025) was an Italian football player and manager who played as a forward. He died on 21 December 2025 at the age of 86.
