= Ignazio Arcoleo =

Italian footballer and manager

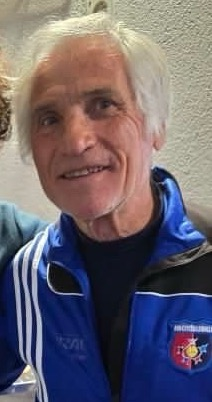

Personal information
- Date of birth: 15 February 1948 (age 78)
- Place of birth: Palermo, Italy
- Position: Midfielder

Youth career
- Elenka T.N.
- Juventina Palermo

Senior career*
Years	Team	Apps	(Gls)
1966–1967	Palermo	4	(0)
1968–1969	Taranto	2	(0)
1970–1974	Palermo	126	(5)
1974–1978	Genoa	132	(8)
1978–1980	Palermo	62	(1)
1980–1982	Reggina		
1982–1983	Nocerina		

Managerial career
- 1983–1985: Mazara
- 1985–1986: Akragas
- 1992–1995: Trapani
- 1995–1997: Palermo
- 1998: Palermo
- 1999–2000: Gualdo
- 2000–2001: Foggia
- 2002: Frosinone
- 2005: Nocerina
- 2006: Trapani (technical director)
- * Club domestic league appearances and goals

Ignazio Arcoleo (born 15 February 1948 in Palermo) is an Italian footballer and manager.

== Playing career ==
Arcoleo, born in Mondello, a Palermo maritime frazione, to a fishermans' family, started his professional career in 1966/1967 for his home city team. He returned to play for Palermo in 1970, becoming one of the most representative players for the rosanero in the period. He also played a Coppa Italia final in 1974, being the author of the foul to Giacomo Bulgarelli which allowed Bologna to kick and score the equaliser penalty in injury time, and then win the tournament on penalty shootouts. From 1974/1975 to 1977/1978, Arcoleo played for Genoa, being remembered as the author of the first football goal ever shown on colour TV, during a Serie A home match against Torino ended in a 1–1 tie and played on 6 February 1977.

Arcoleo returned to Palermo, then in Serie B, on 1978, and again played another unsuccessful Coppa Italia final, lost to top division giants Juventus. He left Palermo in 1980 and retired in 1983.

== Managing career ==
In 1983/1984, Arcoleo started his managing career, becoming head coach of Serie D team Mazara. He coached Mazara for two seasons, winning the Serie D league in 1985: however the promotion was then cancelled by the federation because of alleged matchfixing. In 1985/1986, Arcoleo unsuccessfully coached Akragas, as the then-Serie C2 team relegated at the end of the season despite very strong performances in the second half of the season.

Arcoleo had his breakthrough at the coaching level during his years at the helm of Trapani, another Serie D team, which he led from the top amateur league to Serie C1 and almost reaching an otherwise historical promotion to Serie B, being defeated on playoffs by Gualdo. Thanks to his results on Trapani, Arcoleo was called to coach "his" Palermo the next season. The 1995/1996 Palermo, widely considered a minor Serie B team, was mostly composed by local players, most of them right from Arcoleo's Trapani: despite this, the rosanero managed to play one of their best seasons in the 1990s, obtaining a seventh place in the final league table and gaining several successes in the Coppa Italia, eliminating Serie A well-established teams such as Parma and Vicenza.

The following 1996/1997 season, however, was the beginning of Arcoleo career breakdowns, as he was fired and Palermo then relegated to Serie C1. Arcoleo was recalled to coach Palermo in the latest matches of the 1997/1998 Serie C campaign, with the rosanero involved in a heavy struggle to avoid relegation, ended to a shocking loss to Battipagliese on playoffs which meant to be the second consecutive relegation for both Arcoleo and Palermo.

Since then, Arcoleo coached a number of Serie C teams (Gualdo, Foggia, Frosinone, Nocerina) never being able to end the season in his position. In 2006, he also made a comeback at Trapani, now in Serie D, as "technical director" and aide for the head coach, but did not achieve any success and instead saw his team relegated to Eccellenza. He is currently a football pundit for a number of regional TV channels of Sicily.
