= Davide Succi =

Italian footballer (born 1981)

Personal information
- Date of birth: 11 October 1981 (age 45)
- Place of birth: Bologna, Italy
- Height: 1.84 m (6 ft 0 in)
- Position: Forward

Senior career*
Years	Team	Apps	(Gls)
2000–2005	Chievo	1	(0)
2001–2002	→ Poggese Calcio (loan)	32	(14)
2002–2003	→ Padova (loan)	29	(11)
2003	→ Como (loan)	10	(0)
2004	→ SPAL (loan)	12	(1)
2005	→ Lucchese (loan)	19	(5)
2005–2008	Ravenna	94	(42)
2008–2012	Palermo	30	(7)
2010	→ Bologna (loan)	10	(0)
2010–2012	→ Padova (loan)	33	(15)
2012–2016	Cesena	81	(22)
2016–2017	Chennaiyin	13	(3)
2017	Forlì	15	(1)
2017–2018	Hamrun Spartans	5	(2)
2018	La Fiorita		
2019	AC Massa Lombarda		
2019–2022	ASD Meldola		
Total		375	(123)
- * Club domestic league appearances and goals

Davide Succi (born 11 October 1981) is an Italian former professional footballer who played as a forward.

== Career ==
Davide Succi started his professional career at Chievo. He was co-owned with A.C. Milan and later Genoa C.F.C. He was on loan to various Serie C1 clubs and briefly for Calcio Como in Serie B. He played his only Serie A game, in an away match that Chievo lost 0–1 to Brescia, on 6 November 2004. He left on loan again to Lucchese of Serie C1 in January 2005. In June 2005, Chievo got full ownership of the player, but left on loan to Ravenna in summer 2005.

After winning promotion to Serie B, and Chievo relegated to Serie B, Ravenna bought Succi permanently.

=== Palermo ===
On 1 September 2008, he was signed by Palermo in a co-ownership deal for €1.75 million in 5-year contract, only a few days after having eliminated the rosanero from the 2008–09 Coppa Italia by scoring both goals in a surprising 2–1 away win for Ravenna.

In his first full season in the Italian top flight, Succi scored a total four goals, several of them coming on the pitch during games. On 23 November he scored his first Serie A goal, a late equalizer in a 1–1 away tie against his hometown club Bologna; this was followed by another equalizer, the second rosanero goal in an unexpected 2–2 draw at San Siro against league toppers Inter. Since then scored two more goals, again against Bologna, and then Cagliari. In June 2009 Palermo bought Succi outright for another €1.3 million, made the company had a special financial income of €450,000 for the discount.

On 26 January 2010 Bologna signed the striker on loan from Palermo until June 2010, with an option for the rossoblu to sign the player permanently for €3.5 million. In July 2010, Bologna announced they were not interested in buying Succi, and Palermo successively agreed for a season loan to Serie B club Padova later in August. Again, the club had an option to sign Succi in co-ownership deal for €500,000.

Padova did not excised the option to sign Succi, however on 31 August 2011 Succi returned to Padua in another temporary deal.

On 6 July 2012 Succi moved to Cesena, in Serie B. On 4 July 2013 he signed a new 3-year contract with Cesena. He made a total 35 appearances with five goals in the 2013–14 season, winning promotion back to Serie A with his club.
