= FC Trapani 1905 =

Association football club in Trapani, Italy

Trapani
- Full name: Football Club Trapani 1905 S.r.l.
- Nickname: I Granata (The Maroons)
- Founded: 1905; 121 years ago
- Ground: Stadio Polisportivo Provinciale, Erice, Italy
- Capacity: 7,000
- Chairman: Valerio Antonini
- Manager: Salvatore Aronica
- League: Serie D Group I
- 2025–26: Serie C Group C, 20th of 20 (relegated)
- Website: www.fctrapani1905.net
Home colours	Away colours	Third colours

Football Club Trapani 1905, commonly referred to as Trapani, is an Italian football club based in Trapani, Sicily.

They are nicknamed the Granata (the Maroons), after their kit colour.

== History ==
=== Foundation ===
The club's roots can be traced back to 1905; on 2 April of that year, local newspaper the Gazzetta di Trapani ran an advert requesting young people to form a football association for Trapani. The club founded, by professor Ugolino Montagna and young native Abele Mazzarese to represent the West-Sicilian town was named Unione Sportiva Trapanese. It is one of the oldest teams on the island, after Palermo and Messina.

U.S. Trapanese's first president was Giuseppe Platamone, and the club played its games at Via Spalti. The club's first official game came against Palermo in October 1908; the more experienced Palermitan team won emphatically, scoring 12 goals. The Trapanese bounced back, however, playing local derbies against teams from Marsala and Erice.

=== Post-war times ===
After World War I, in 1921, three local teams rose: Vigor, Bencivegna and Drepanum. During the 1921–22 season, Vigor finished 6th in the Sicilian section of the national championship of the C.C.I. (Confederazione Calcistica Italiana). On 22 January 1923, a merger occurred between Vigor and Drepanum; the club decided to revive the previous name U.S. Trapanese.

In June 1926, the club's name was changed to A.S. Trapani. In the 1930–31 season, under the name Juventus Trapani, the club won promotion from III Divisione to II Divisione. The following season, they achieved promotion again, this time into the early 1930s equivalent of Serie C. They finished 8th in Serie C in the 1942–43 season, but then football in Italy was put on hold for World War II.

=== 1940s, 50s and 60s ===
Just after World War II, the club used the name A.S. Trapani for one season before changing its name to A.S. Drepanum. They were entered into Serie C, which, at the time, was divided into many regional groups. For the 1947–48 season, they qualified for the new, smaller Serie C, even finishing above Messina. Unfortunately for the club, they were relegated to Serie D in the 1949–50 season after finishing second from bottom.

=== 1990s: peak and decline ===
With former Serie A player Ignazio Arcoleo as head coach, Trapani experienced two consecutive promotions from Serie D to Serie C1 in the early 1990s.

In 1995, a strong and qualified team composed mostly of young promising players such as Marco Materazzi and more experienced local footballers such as Francesco Galeoto qualified to the promotion play-off, but ultimately lost to Walter Novellino's Gualdo in the semi-finals with a late goal scored on injury time. After that, Trapani experienced a slow but continuous decline despite attempts to repeat past successes: Arcoleo left Trapani to coach Palermo along with some of the best players, including Galeoto. The club then relegated to Serie C2 in 1997, Serie D in 2000 and even Eccellenza in the 2005–06 season, despite a late attempt by Arcoleo and former star Gaetano Vasari to save the team from relegation. In addition, the club also received a 12-point deduction for the 2006–07 season following a match-fixing attempt recognized by the Football Federation. In its 2006–07 Eccellenza campaign, Trapani, coached by former Parma midfielder Tarcisio Catanese, ended the regular season phase to eleventh place and escaped relegation after having won relegation play-offs to Terrasini in a 5–0 single-legged win. From 2007 onwards, Trapani competed in the Serie D with little success.

=== From Serie D to Serie B and league exclusion ===
In 2009, chairman Vittorio Morace appointed Roberto Boscaglia as new head coach, intending to bring the club's return into professionalism; in his first season in charge, Trapani ended as runner-up behind Milazzo. However, later in August, due to the high number of resignations of clubs in the higher tiers, Trapani was admitted into the 2010–11 Lega Pro Seconda Divisione (formerly Serie C2), thus ending the club's 13-year absence from the professional tiers.

In 2010–11, Trapani finished as runner-up in the Lega Pro Seconda Divisione Group C and successively won the promotion play-offs to Lega Pro Prima Divisione. In the first campaign in the third tier, Trapani surprised everyone by topping the league against all odds; an end-of-season crisis, however, led to the Sicilians being overtaken by Spezia in the penultimate week of the season and losing a direct promotion. In the subsequent promotion play-offs, after defeating Cremonese in the semi-finals, Trapani lost a two-legged final to fourth-placed outsiders Lanciano. In the following season, however, Trapani were crowned champions (this time in group A) and finally promoted to Serie B for the first time ever.

In 2015–16, with Serse Cosmi as their coach, they finished in 3rd place, losing to Pescara in the playoff final. However, they started off badly the following season, sacking Cosmi on 30 November with the club in last place. The appointment of Alessandro Calori saw an improvement in form, and they ended the season in 19th place, sitting in the relegation play-off spots. Unfortunately, 18th placed Ternana finished five points above the Granata, meaning the club were relegated to Serie C for the 2017–18 season.

Trapani's first season return to the third tier, with Calori still in charge, saw the Granata ending in third place (behind US Lecce and Catania) and then being eliminated at the playoff stage by eventual winners Cosenza.

During the summer of 2018, Trapani's ownership announced their intention to sell the club and reduce the budget due to financial and legal issues surrounding the parent company, Ustica Lines. Vincenzo Italiano was hired as the new head coach in place of Calori, with Raffaele Rubino as sporting director for the new season. The season also saw the club being sold from the Morace family to the FM Service company, owned by Maurizio De Simone. The club ended the season in second place, and had a successful campaign in the subsequent promotion playoffs, making it to the finals against Piacenza after defeating Catania in the semi-finals.

On 5 June 2019, just a few days after the first leg of the playoff finals, the Trapani playing squad announced their intention to send their notice of default after the new ownership had repeatedly failed to pay their salaries. On 15 June 2019, Trapani defeated Piacenza 2–0 to win their second promotion to Serie B in the club's history. The very next day, Rome-based property developer Giorgio Heller (who was already linked to the club in the past) announced his acquisition of a majority 80% share of the club. The takeover was formally finalized on 21 June 2019, in time to allow the club to successfully register for the 2019–20 Serie B season.

However, after an unfavourable season that ended with immediate relegation to Serie C, Trapani were excluded altogether on 5 October 2020 due to outstanding financial issues.

=== Restart from Serie D and Serie C return ===
In the summer of 2021, Paceco-based Serie D club Dattilo acquired the footballing rights of Trapani, including the logo, and renamed themselves as Football Club Trapani 1905. In their debut season under the new denomination, Trapani ended in a mid-table finish. In April 2023, the club was bought for €1,240,000 by Valerio Antonini. Under his tenure, Trapani dominated the 2023–24 Serie D Group I, without losing a single match in the league, winning promotion to Serie C immediately.

On 29 May 2024, Trapani also won the Coppa Italia Serie D title, defeating Follonica Gavorrano in a two-legged final.

== Rivalries ==
Trapani's main rivals are Marsala 1912 and Mazara, from the neighbouring cities of Marsala and Mazara del Vallo. A rivalry with Palermo also exists but has rarely been contested: Palermo and Trapani briefly played together in Serie C1 and renewed their rivalry in the 2013–14 Serie B campaign.

== Current squad ==
As of 27 July 2026

Note: Flags indicate national team as defined under FIFA eligibility rules; some limited exceptions apply. Players may hold more than one non-FIFA nationality.

No.	Pos.	Nation	Player
—	GK	ITA	Simone Salamone
—	GK	ITA	Alex Sposito
—	DF	MAD	Louis Démoléon
—	DF	ITA	Simone Giuliano
—	DF	MDA	Andrei Motoc
—	MF	ITA	Domenico Anzelmo
—	MF	ITA	Giovanni Aronica
—	MF	ITA	Cristiano La Sorsa

No.	Pos.	Nation	Player
—	MF	ITA	Dario Maltese
—	MF	ITA	Zak Ruggiero
—	MF	ITA	Riccardo Sciortino
—	FW	ALB	Besmir Balla
—	FW	SEN	Mamadou Kanouté
—	FW	ITA	Luca Sasanelli
—	FW	ARG	Federico Vázquez

== Honours ==
=== Domestic ===
==== League ====
- Lega Pro Prima Divisione
  - Winners: 2012–13
- Serie C2
  - Winners: 1993–94
- Serie D
  - Winners: 1971–72, 1984–85, 1992–93, 2023–24
- II Divisione
  - Winners: 1931–32
- III Divisione
  - Winners: 1930–31

==== Cup ====
- Coppa Italia Serie D
  - Winners: 2023–24

== Notable former managers ==
- (Austria) Heinrich Schönfeld (1930–33)
- (Italy) Achille Piccini (1949–50)
- (Hungary) Ferenc Plemich (1953)
- (Italy) Gastone Prendato (1955–57), (1961–62)
- (Italy) Leandro Remondini (1962–63)
- (Italy) Alberto Eliani (1972–73)
- (Italy) Egizio Rubino (1977–79)
- (Uruguay) Washington Cacciavillani (1981–83)
- (Italy) Mario Facco (1989–90)
- (Italy) Ignazio Arcoleo (1992–95)
- (Italy) Ivo Iaconi (1996–97)
- (Italy) Ezio Capuano (1999–00)
- (Italy) Tarcisio Catanese (2006–08)
- (Italy) Roberto Boscaglia (2009–15)
- (Italy) Serse Cosmi (2015–16)
- (Italy) Vincenzo Italiano (2018–19)
- (Italy) Francesco Baldini (2019–2021)

== Former players ==
- Ivo Banella (1974–1978)
