= Stadio Gianpiero Vitali =

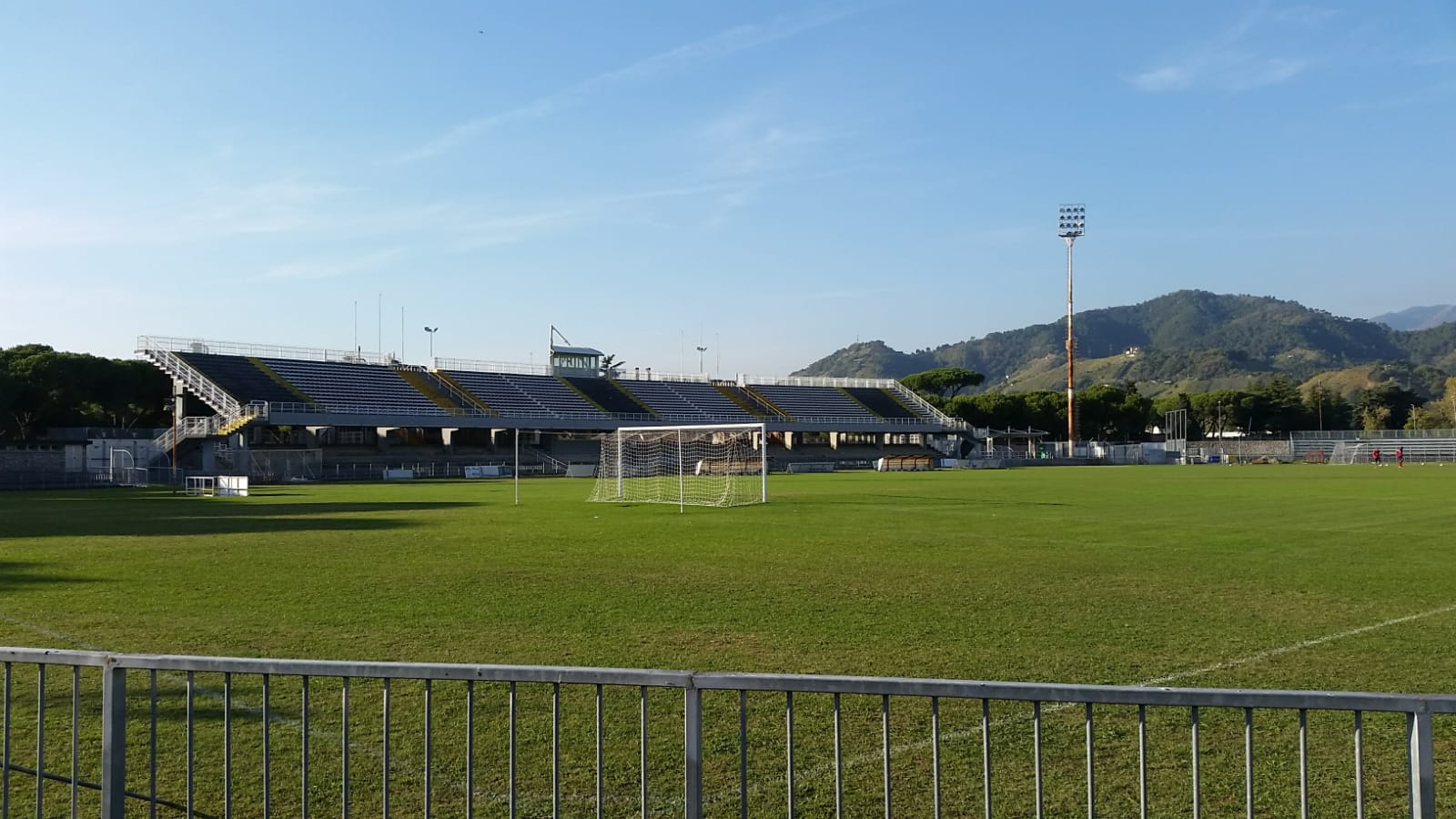
- Stadiogiampierovitali
- Interactive map of Stadio Gianpiero Vitali
- Location: Massa, Italy
- Coordinates: 44°1′51″N 10°7′0″E
- Owner: Municipality of Massa
- Capacity: 11,500
- Surface: Grass

Construction
- Opened: 1960

Tenant
- U.S. Massese 1919

Stadio Gianpiero Vitali, also known as Stadio degli Oliveti is a multi-use stadium in Massa, Italy. It is currently used mostly for football matches and is the home ground of U.S. Massese 1919. The stadium holds 11,500 and was opened in 1960. In 2020 it was named after Giampiero Vitali, historic captain of U.S. Massese 1919 who, with his 245 continuous appearances (only league), holds the all-time attendance record with the Massese team.

In the mid-2000s, the sports facility underwent renovation works. Further renovations were carried out in 2022 with the reconstruction of the stadium bleacher, coloring it in black and white and also designing the U.S. Massese 1919 company logo.
The stadium is located near the center of the city of Massa, and in the period in which Massese played in Serie C, the Apuan derby, also known as the marble derby, was played between Massese and Carrarese. The stadium also hosted a training session of the Italy national team.
