= Fiano =

Fiano may refer to:

Places:

- Fiano, Piedmont, a town in Piedmont, Italy
- Fiano Romano, a town in Lazio, Italy

Viticulture:

- Fiano (grape), a white grape variety from Campania, Italy
- Fiano di Avellino, an Italian wine DOCG

== See also ==
- Foiano (disambiguation)
