= Maurizio Ciaramitaro =

Italian footballer

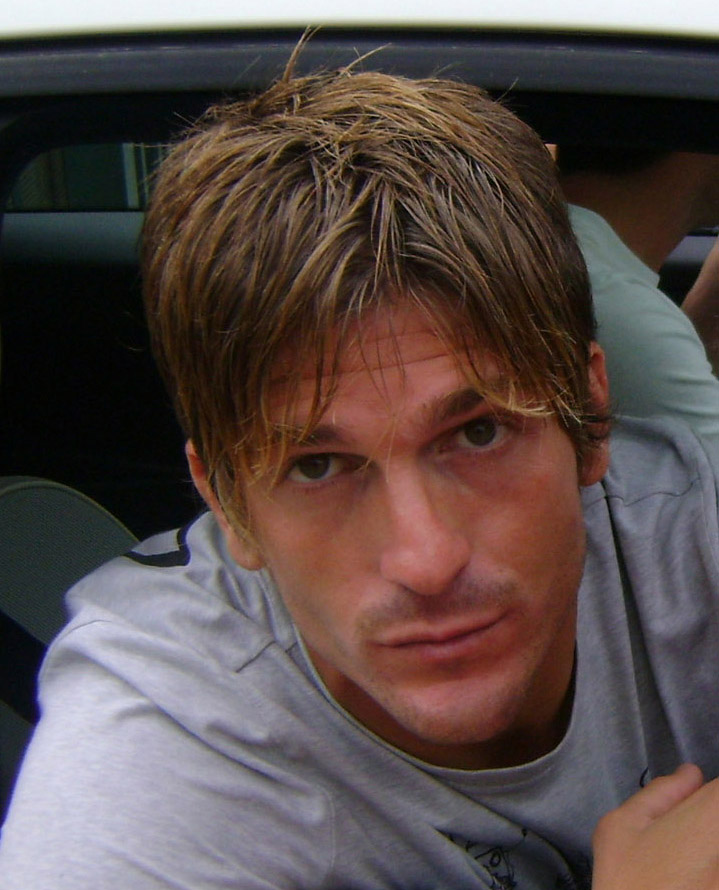

Personal information
- Date of birth: 16 January 1982 (age 44)
- Place of birth: Palermo, Italy
- Height: 1.80 m (5 ft 11 in)
- Position: Midfielder

Youth career
- Palermo

Senior career*
Years	Team	Apps	(Gls)
2000–2002	Palermo	0	(0)
2001–2002	→ Avellino (loan)	11	(0)
2002–2004	Livorno	43	(0)
2004–2006	Cesena	68	(11)
2006–2010	Palermo	9	(0)
2006–2007	→ Parma (loan)	17	(0)
2007–2008	→ Chievo (loan)	29	(4)
2009	→ Salernitana (loan)	17	(2)
2009–2010	→ Bellinzona (loan)	11	(0)
2011–2013	Modena	34	(2)
2013	→ Vicenza (loan)	18	(0)
2013–2017	Trapani	99	(6)

International career
2003–2004	Italy U21 Serie B	2	(0)
- * Club domestic league appearances and goals

Maurizio Ciaramitaro (born 16 January 1982) is a former Italian football midfielder.

== Career ==
A Palermo youth system product, Ciaramitaro was however never constantly included into the first team and was instead often sent out on loan throughout his career: he had spells of such kind at Avellino, Livorno (also co-ownership deal), Cesena (co-ownership deal in second season), Parma and Chievo.

He was bought back from Cesena in June 2006 by terminated the co-ownership agreement but sent to Parma as part of Fabio Simplicio and Mark Bresciano's deal. Igor Budan also left for Parma from Palermo. He returned to Palermo in January 2007. He then left for Chievo on loan with first-option to sign. In January 2009 he left for Salernitana with option to co-own the player.

In July 2009 he was loaned out again, this time to Swiss Super League side AC Bellinzona.

He returned to Palermo in June 2010 after his loan to Bellinzona ended, but the Sicilian club did not find a good destination for him in the summer, thus forcing Ciaramitaro to stay at the team, but without being included into the first team.

On 6 January 2011, he terminated his contract with club and joined Modena on free transfer.
