= Fernando Veneranda =

Italian footballer and manager

Personal information
- Date of birth: 23 May 1941
- Place of birth: Porto San Giorgio, Italy
- Date of death: 1 March 2007 (aged 65)
- Place of death: Porto San Giorgio, Italy
- Position: Striker

Youth career
- ?–1960: Sangiorgese

Senior career*
Years	Team	Apps	(Gls)
1960–1962	Fiorentina	0	(0)
1962–1964	Prato	63	(14)
1964–1966	Brescia	29	(3)
1966–1967	Potenza	33	(6)
1967–1968	Palermo	15	(2)
1968–1969	Genoa	2	(1)
1969–1973	Matera	113	(10)

Managerial career
- 1973–1974: Matera
- 1974–1975: Campobasso
- 1975–1976: Marsala
- 1976–1979: Palermo
- 1979–1980: Verona
- 1980–1981: Palermo
- 1981–1982: Foggia
- 1982–1984: Avellino
- 1984–1985: Cagliari
- 1985–1986: Palermo
- 1986–1987: Taranto
- 1988–1989: Taranto
- 1990–1991: Triestina
- 1991–1992: Messina
- * Club domestic league appearances and goals

Fernando Veneranda (23 May 1941 – 1 March 2007 in Porto San Giorgio) was an Italian football (soccer) player and manager.

== Playing career ==
Veneranda, a forward, started his professional career for Fiorentina, where he played from 1960 to 1963. He never played a single Serie A match, but appeared in a Cup Winners' Cup match, as well as in the Coppa Italia and Mitropa Cup. He owns the record of being the Fiorentina players with the highest number of appearances without having ever played a league match. He then played for a number of Serie A, B and C clubs. Veneranda ended his playing career in 1973 for Matera, and soon became manager of the same club.

== Managing career ==
After his time at Matera, Veneranda moved to Campobasso, Marsala, and to Palermo, a former playing club of his, at the end of the 1976/1977 season. He is best remembered among Palermo fans for having led the Serie B club to its second Coppa Italia final in history, then lost 2–1 to giants Juventus. Despite this, Veneranda coached only a single Serie A team in his whole career, Avellino; he was called to coach the biancoverdi in October 1982 and obtained a good ninth place for the small club; he was fired after the tenth matchday of the next season. Veneranda retired from football in 1992, after he relegated to Serie C1 with Messina.

Veneranda died on 1 March 2007, aged 65, in his native city of Porto San Giorgio.
