= Renzo Gobbo =

Italian footballer and manager

Personal information
- Date of birth: 13 January 1961 (age 65)
- Place of birth: Castelfranco Veneto, Italy
- Height: 1.75 m (5 ft 9 in)
- Position: Central midfielder

Senior career*
Years	Team	Apps	(Gls)
1977–1980	Montebelluna	44	(7)
1980–1983	Como	55	(5)
1983–1984	Catanzaro	34	(2)
1984–1985	Como	21	(0)
1985–1986	Brescia	32	(3)
1986–1988	Messina	60	(2)
1988–1991	Venezia	72	(4)
1991–1993	Massese	51	(1)
1993–1995	Carrarese	40	(0)

International career
1981	Italy U-21	1	(0)

Managerial career
- 1995–1996: Sondrio (player-manager)
- 1996–1998: Sondrio
- 1998–2001: Canzese
- 2001–2002: Usmate
- 2002–2003: Pro Vercelli
- 2004–2005: Carrarese
- 2006–2007: Palermo (assistant coach)
- 2007: Palermo (caretaker)
- 2007: Palermo (assistant coach)
- 2008–2010: Montichiari
- 2010: Ternana
- 2012: Sambonifacese
- * Club domestic league appearances and goals

Renzo Gobbo (born 13 January 1961 in Castelfranco Veneto) is the Italian association football former manager of Sambonifacese and former player.

== Career ==
=== Playing ===
Gobbo, a midfielder, made his playing debut with Montebelluna before to move to Como in 1980, where he made his Serie A debut. During his time at Como, Gobbo made also a single appearance in the Italian U-21 team in 1981. He then played for several Serie B and C teams before to retire from professional football in 1995.

=== Coaching ===
In 1996, he became coach of amateur team Sondrio. In 1998, he signed for Canzese, a Prima Categoria club which he led to two consecutive promotions up to Eccellenza. In 2001, he obtained the coaching license with a top grade of 110/110. After a short spell at Serie D team Usmate, which he did not manage to save from relegation, Gobbo was appointed coach of Serie C2 club Pro Vercelli in November 2002, and saved the team from relegation. In April 2004 he was appointed by Carrarese, another Serie C2 team in danger of relegation, which he saved too. He coached Carrarese also in 2004–2005, missing a spot in the promotion playoffs. He was fired in 2005, after the fifth matchday.

In 2006, after having been considered for the Kazakhstan national football team managing position, he became assistant coach of Francesco Guidolin at Serie A club U.S. Città di Palermo. On 23 April 2007 Renzo Gobbo was appointed as caretaker alongside Rosario Pergolizzi following the dismissal of Guidolin. He however served for only three matches before being sacked himself too, being replaced by his predecessor Guidolin and moved back to his previous assistantship position alongside him. He was then confirmed as assistant coach after Stefano Colantuono's signing as new head coach, being later fired on late November together with Colantuono and the whole technical staff.

On 8 December 2008 he was appointed as new head coach of Lega Pro Seconda Divisione club Montichiari. A relegation to Serie D under his tenure was followed by a prompt return into professionalism in 2009–10 as league champions.

In July 2010 Gobbo was announced as new head coach of Lega Pro Prima Divisione club Ternana. On 12 October 2010 he was sacked.

From 28 February to 19 March 2012 he was the coach of Sambonifacese.
