= Alberto Cossentino =

Italian football defender (born 1988)

Personal information
- Date of birth: 10 September 1988 (age 38)
- Place of birth: Palermo, Italy
- Height: 1.87 m (6 ft 1 1/2 in)
- Position: Centre back

Team information
- Current team: Don Carlo Misilmeri

Youth career
- Palermo

Senior career*
Years	Team	Apps	(Gls)
2006–2010	Palermo	1	(0)
2008–2009	→ Triestina (loan)	0	(0)
2009–2012	Novara	7	(0)
2011	→ Gela (loan)	9	(0)
2011–2012	→ Andria BAT (loan)	26	(3)
2012–2015	Reggiana	26	(0)
2014	→ Torres (loan)	7	(0)
2015	Aversa Normanna	0	(0)
2016–2017	Modena	9	(1)
2017	Siracusa	4	(0)
2017–2018	Latina	29	(3)
2018	Messina	5	(0)
2018–2019	ASD Sancataldese	9	(0)
2019–2020	Torres	2	(0)
2020–	Don Carlo Misilmeri		

International career
2007	Italy U-19	2	(0)
2007–2008	Italy U-20	3	(0)
- * Club domestic league appearances and goals as of 17:52, 5 May 2020 (UTC)

Alberto Cossentino (born 10 September 1988) is an Italian football defender who plays for Don Carlo Misilmeri.

== Career ==
=== Club career ===
A product of the Palermos youth system, Cossentino made his first team debut with the Rosanero being featured in the starter lineup in a Coppa Italia 2006-07 match against Sampdoria, and then a 2006–07 UEFA Cup game against Fenerbahçe. He was confirmed to the Rosanero first team squad also for the 2007–08 campaign, and finally made his Serie A debut on 30 March 2008 at Stadio San Paolo, against Napoli.

In July 2008 Cossentino accepted a loan to Serie B side Triestina in order to gain more first team experience. However, he did not manage to play a single match for the alabardati, and returned to Palermo in January 2009.

In July 2009 Cossentino agreed another move on loan, and spent the 2009–10 season with Lega Pro Prima Divisione side Novara, where he played only six games throughout a season that ended with his side winning the league and ensuring promotion to Serie B. In July 2010 Palermo announced to have sold half of Cossentino's registration rights to Novara. On 29 January 2011 he was loaned to Gela. Cossentino made his second comeback to Novara in June 2011, as his co-ownership was solved in favour of the piemontesi. On 30 August 2011 he moved on loan to Andria BAT.

On 13 July 2012, he joined Reggiana on a permanent deal. He was released on 7 January 2015.

He joined Modena for the 2016–17 season, but was released later in January 2017 and successively signed by another Lega Pro club, Siracusa, on 2 February 2017 as a free transfer.

In June 2019, Cossentino joined Torres.

In October 2020 he signed for Eccellenza Sicily amateurs Don Carlo Misilmeri.

=== International career ===
Cossentino has also appeared for the Italian team at Under-19 and Under-20 level.
