= Nicola Ficano =

Italian football defender/midfielder

Personal information
- Date of birth: 21 February 1987 (age 39)
- Place of birth: Palermo, Italy
- Height: 1.82 m (5 ft 11 1/2 in)
- Positions: Left wing; left back

Youth career
- Palermo

Senior career*
Years	Team	Apps	(Gls)
2006–2008	Palermo	0	(0)
2007–2008	→ Sambenedettese (co-ownership)	0	(0)
2008	→ Martina (loan)	8	(0)
2008–2009	Sambenedettese	0	(0)
2009	→ Colligiana (loan)	6	(0)
2010–2011	Parmonval		
2011	Palermitana		
2011–2014	Audace Monreale		
- * Club domestic league appearances and goals as of 23:14, 28 August 2012 (UTC)

Nicola Ficano (born 21 February 1987) is an Italian football defender or midfielder. He played professionally with hometown club Palermo.

== Career ==
A product of Palermo's youth system, he made his debut for the club playing as starter in the 2006–2007 Coppa Italia (against Sampdoria) and UEFA Cup (against Fenerbahçe).

He was sold in a co-ownership bid to Sambenedettese, together with fellow player Davis Curiale, during the summer of 2007, after he refused an offer from Mezzocorona. He was then loaned out to Martina on 31 January 2008.

In June 2008 Sambenedettese bought the remaining half of his registration rights from Palermo. He spent the second half of the season on loan to Lega Pro Seconda Divisione club Colligiana, and was subsequently released after Sambenedettese was excluded from Italian football due to financial troubles.

In November 2009, he joined Carrarese for a trial period, but he was not eventually offered a contract.

He successively left professional football for good, joining Eccellenza Sicily amateurs Parmonval (based in the Palermo neighbourhood of Partanna-Mondello) in 2010. Ficano was announced in August 2011 as a new acquisition from Eccellenza Sicily amateurs Palermitana, thus effectively ending his professional career at the age of 24. He then joined another team from same division, Audace Monreale (based in Monreale), later in December 2011.
