= Rosario Pergolizzi =

Italian football coach and former player (born 1968)

Personal information
- Date of birth: 7 October 1968 (age 58)
- Place of birth: Palermo, Italy
- Height: 1.72 m (5 ft 7 1/2 in)
- Position: Defender

Team information
- Current team: Giulianova (head coach)

Senior career*
Years	Team	Apps	(Gls)
1986–1987	Olbia	32	(1)
1987–1988	Napoli	1	(0)
1988–1990	Reggina	49	(4)
1990–1993	Ascoli	99	(7)
1993–1996	Bologna	91	(4)
1996–1997	Brescia	33	(1)
1997–1998	Padova	30	(0)
1998–2000	Ravenna	72	(0)
2000–2001	Padova	2	(0)
2001–2002	Olbia	1	(0)

Managerial career
- 2002–2003: Ascoli (assistant coach)
- 2003–2004: Bari (assistant coach)
- 2004–2005: Olbia
- 2007: Palermo (joint caretaker)
- 2011–2011: Portogruaro
- 2011: Pavia
- 2013: Ascoli
- 2014–2016: Marsala
- 2019–2020: Palermo
- 2023–2024: Campobasso
- 2024: LFA Reggio Calabria
- 2025–: Giulianova
- * Club domestic league appearances and goals

Rosario Pergolizzi (born 7 October 1968) is an Italian football coach and former player. He is the head coach of Serie D club Giulianova.

== Playing career ==
Pergolizzi, a defender, made his professional debut with Sardinian team Olbia Calcio; he then moved to Napoli, where he made a single appearance in the Serie A 1987-88. Pergolizzi then played for several minor Serie A and Serie B clubs, including Ascoli, Bologna, Brescia, Padova and Ravenna. He retired in 2001–2002, after a single appearance with Olbia, then in Serie D.

== Coaching career ==
Pergolizzi started his coaching career in 2002 as Giuseppe Pillon's assistant coach at Ascoli of Serie C1. The same year, the club immediately gained promotion to Serie B. In 2003–2004, he followed Pillon at Bari.

From 2004 to 2005, he coached Serie C2 club Olbia, the same team in which he started and ended his playing career. In 2005, he was appointed to coach Palermo's youth squad. In his first season, he reached the semifinals of both the Campionato Nazionale Primavera and the Coppa Italia Primavera. In 2006–2007, he again reached the Coppa Italia Primavera semifinals, where his team was defeated by Juventus.

On 23 April 2007, following the firing of head coach Francesco Guidolin, Pergolizzi was appointed alongside first-team assistant manager Renzo Gobbo to coach Palermo for the five remaining Serie A league matches. He served for only three games before being sacked and replaced by his predecessor, Guidolin.

After a year without a job, in the summer of 2008, Pergolizzi returned to his previous role as coach of the Palermo youth team. In his first season back with the Palermo youngsters, he guided the under-19 team to win the Campionato Nazionale Primavera for a historical first time after defeating tipped favourites Juventus in the quarter-finals, Chievo in the semi-final, and Siena in the league final. He left Palermo in June 2010 to get back into first-team coaching.

In June 2011 he was unveiled as new head coach of Portogruaro, who will take part to the 2011–12 Lega Pro Prima Divisione after being relegated from Serie B. On 18 July 2011 he was forced, in agreement with the company, to leave his post due to serious family problems.

On 26 October 2011, he was named head coach of Pavia. He resigned a few weeks later, on 5 December, due to poor results.

On 20 March 2013, he was named new manager of Ascoli, but he was relieved of his duties again on 13 April 2013.

He was successively reappointed at the helm of Ascoli in July 2013 after the club's relegation to Lega Pro, but resigned on 27 October 2013 after a 2–5 home loss to Lecce.

On 27 November 2014, he was named the new head coach of Eccellenza Sicily amateur team Marsala. guiding them to promotion to Serie D by the end of the season. However, on the following 2015–16 Serie D season, he suffered immediate relegation on the final matchday of the season.

On 30 July 2018, he was named the new Under-17 coach of Empoli for the 2018–19 season.

On 3 August 2019, he was unveiled as the new head coach of the refounded Palermo, that played Serie D in 2019–20. Palermo was promoted to Serie C at the end of the season as Pergolizzi left the club.

Between 2021 and 2022, Pergolizzi returned to Ascoli, this time as a youth coach in charge of the Under-19 team.

On 11 October 2023, Pergolizzi was appointed new head coach of Serie D club Campobasso. On 28 April 2024, Pergolizzi won the league title with Campobasso with a game in hand. On 17 May 2024, Campobasso announced to have mutually parted ways with Pergolizzi with immediate effect.

On 13 June 2024, he was hired as the new head coach of Serie D club LFA Reggio Calabria. He resigned in November 2024 due to family issues.

On 1 October 2025, Pergolizzi was unveiled as the new head coach of Serie D club Giulianova.

== Honours ==
=== Player ===
Bologna

- Serie B: 1995–96
- Serie C1: 1994–95 (Group A)

Brescia

- Serie B: 1996–97

Olbia

- Serie D: 2001–02 (Group B)

=== Managerial ===
Palermo

- Campionato Nazionale Primavera: 2008–09
- Serie D: 2019–20 (Group I)

Campobasso

- Serie D: 2023–24 (Group F)

Marsala

- Eccellenza Sicily: 2014–15 (Group A)
- Coppa Italia Dilettanti Sicilia: 2014–15
