= US Massese 1919 =

Italian football club

Massese
- Full name: Unione Sportiva Massese 1919
- Founded: 1919; 1945 (refounded)
- Ground: Stadio degli Oliveti, Massa, Italy
- Capacity: 11,500
- Chairman: Giuseppe Della Bona
- Manager: Antonio Gerini
- League: Eccellenza/Tuscany
- 2022–23: 10th
Home colours	Away colours

Unione Sportiva Massese 1919 is an Italian football club, based in Massa, Tuscany. Massese currently plays in Serie E, having last been in Serie B in 1970–71 season.

== History ==
The first club in Massa was founded in 1919 as Società Sportiva Juventus Massa with green colors.

The black and white Massese dates back to the end of World War II in 1945. In the summer of 1991 it was renamed Unione Sportiva Massese 1919, but in 2009 it went bankrupt and it was reformed under the current name.

In the season 2011–12 the team was promoted from Eccellenza Tuscany/A to Serie D after playoffs.

== Colors and badge ==
The team's colors are black and white.

== Notable former players ==
- (Italy) Claudio Vinazzani
- (Italy) Giorgio Chinaglia
- (Italy) Roberto Mussi
- (Italy) Giancarlo Oddi
- (Italy) Gianluca Pessotto
- (Italy) Giacomo Lorenzini
