= 2010–11 US Città di Palermo season =

U.S. Città di Palermo
2010–11 season
- Chairman: Maurizio Zamparini
- Head coach: Delio Rossi (until Week 27); Serse Cosmi (from Week 28 to 31); Delio Rossi (from Week 32)
- Serie A: 8th
- UEFA Europa League: Group stage
- Coppa Italia: Runners-up
Home colours	Away colours	Third colours

U.S. Città di Palermo played the 2010–11 season in Serie A, the seventh consecutive season for the Sicilian club in the Italian top flight since their return to the league in 2004.

== Review and events ==
US Palermo lineup in a UEFA Europa League game against PFC CSKA Moscow.

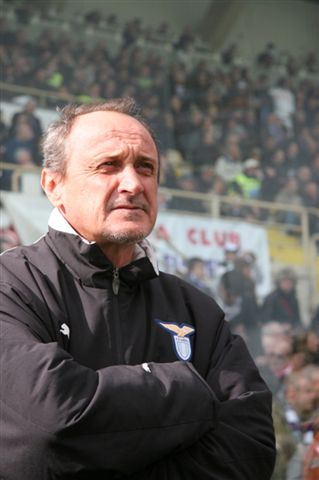
Delio Rossi, the head coach of Palermo until Week 27 and from Week 32.

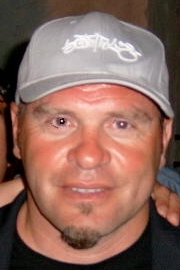
Serse Cosmi was appointed the head coach following Delio Rossi's dismissal, only for 4 Weeks.

Long-time Palermo players Fábio Simplício and Mark Bresciano left the rosanero by 30 June after failing to agree for a contract extension with the club. On 29 May 2010 Legea was announced as Palermo's new teamwear sponsor, taking over such duties from Lotto Sport Italia. The club also announced in June 2010 a one-year agreement extension with main sponsor Eurobet.

The first high-profile move from Palermo was completed on 11 June, when the club announced the signing of Chilean prolific striker Mauricio Pinilla from Grosseto. The move was followed by the signing of experienced Siena forward Massimo Maccarone days later.

On 6 July it was confirmed the appointment of 38-year-old former player Giovanni Tedesco as the club's new team manager. On 7 July Palermo also announced the signing of Polish international defender Kamil Glik.

On 8 July, Palermo announced to have sold Danish international centre-back Simon Kjær to 1. Bundesliga club VfL Wolfsburg. Four days later, the club confirmed to have signed Italy U-20 international Matteo Darmian from AC Milan in a co-ownership bid.

On 16 July Palermo announced the signing of Argentine full-back Santiago García from Rosario Central. The next day Napoli announced the acquisition of Uruguayan international striker Edinson Cavani from the rosanero club.

As a replacement for Kjær, Palermo then chose to acquire young Argentine centre back Ezequiel Muñoz; the player was successively announced to have joined the club's Austrian training camp on 30 July, after he underwent a medical in Sicily. The transfer was officially formalized on 4 August. On 6 August, Paolo Beruatto was introduced as the new head of the Primavera under-19 squad. On the same day, Palermo was coupled to Slovenian club NK Maribor for the playoff round of the 2010–11 UEFA Europa League, with the first leg scheduled at Stadio Renzo Barbera, Palermo on 19 August, and the return leg seven days later at Maribor's home venue. In the first leg, and the first competitive seasonal game for Palermo, the Sicilians defeated Maribor with a clear result of 3–0, thanks to goals from Maccarone, Hernández and Pastore; the rosanero won the qualification to the group stage one week late, despite losing the return leg 3–2. On the following group stage draw, Palermo was included in Group F together with PFC CSKA Moscow, Sparta Prague and FC Lausanne-Sport.

On 27 August 2010 Maribor announced to have sold midfielders Armin Bačinović and Josip Iličić, both Slovenian internationals, to Palermo. The first league game, played on 29 August, ended in a 0–0 home draw to Cagliari; on the very next day, Palermo announced the signing of Brazilian 18-year-old attacking midfielder João Pedro from Atlético Mineiro.

Palermo started the season in good fashion, achieving impressive results such as away wins against Juventus and Fiorentina, as well a clear home win against Roma; in particular, the newly acquired Slovenian duo of Bačinović and Ilicić proved to be an absolute bargain signing, with both players being regularly featured in Palermo's Serie A games and praised. Other new signings who managed to break into the first team in a regular basis included defender Ezequiel Muñoz and striker Mauricio Pinilla.

Impressive results at domestic league level were not repeated in the Europa League, as Palermo was eliminated by the likes of PFC CSKA Moscow and Sparta Prague, ending the qualification round with only 7 points (2 wins, 1 draw, 3 losses).

In December 2010 Palermo confirmed to have signed a third Slovenian player from Maribor, defender Siniša Anđelković, who will join the rosanero from January 2011. A fourth Slovenian player, midfielder Jasmin Kurtić, was acquired days later.

Another winter move was completed on 24 January 2011, with striker Massimo Maccarone departing from Sicily after only six months, in order to join fellow Serie A club Sampdoria in a permanent transfer move. The following day, Palermo won qualification to the Coppa Italia semifinals after defeating Parma on penalties.

This result was followed by a string of three consecutive defeats, the latest of whom being a record home loss in which a nine-man Palermo succumbed to Udinese in a shocking 0–7 result, which represents both the largest home loss and the largest Serie A loss in the club's history. Such result led to immediate rumours regarding an imminent dismissal of head coach Delio Rossi, that was informally confirmed by Zamparini himself in several interview throughout the day. The next day Palermo formally announced the dismissal of Delio Rossi and the appointment Serse Cosmi as his replacement. After two more losses (against Lazio and Genoa, respectively), Cosmi achieved his first win in charge of Palermo by surprisingly defeating league-toppers AC Milan in a 1–0 home triumph, with Romanian defender Dorin Goian scoring the only goal of the game.

On 3 April 2011 Cosmi, after the defeat in the derby with Catania, for 4–0 was sacked. In its place, after 4 games back Delio Rossi. Rossi's return led Palermo ultimately back to track with a surprising 3–2 win at Stadio Olimpico against Roma, and an even more surprising win in the Coppa Italia semifinals, where the rosanero defeated freshly-crowned Italian champions AC Milan with an aggregate 4–3 win (2–2 in Milan, 2–1 in Palermo), thus qualifying the Sicilians to the domestic cup final for their third time in history. The final, that saw a massive participation from Palermo fans, ended however in a rather controversial 1–3 loss to Inter, with Muñoz scoring the only goal for the rosanero in a game the Sicilians were forced to play without key elements as Bačinović and Bovo, and with Goian getting injured in the first half to be replaced by Moris Carrozzieri, who was at his second game in the season after a two-year suspension due to cocaine usage. In the days following the event, Zamparini and Delio Rossi announced to have parted company, thus freeing the Palermo dugout for the new season.

=== Confirmed summer transfer market bids ===
In

—	MF	SUI	Pajtim Kasami (from AC Bellinzona)
—	FW	CHI	Mauricio Pinilla (from Grosseto)
—	FW	ITA	Massimo Maccarone (from Siena)
—	DF	POL	Kamil Glik (from Piast Gliwice)
—	DF	ITA	Matteo Darmian (from Milan, co-ownership)
—	GK	ITA	Giacomo Brichetto (from Novara)
—	DF	ARG	Santiago García (from Rosario Central)
—	GK	ITA	Francesco Benussi (from Lecce)
—	DF	ARG	Ezequiel Muñoz (from Boca Juniors)
—	GK	ITA	Mattia Migani (from Rimini, free transfer)
—	FW	ITA	Michele Pieri (from Rimini, free transfer)
—	DF	GRE	Sokratis Tsoukalas (from Atromitos)
—	DF	ITA	Nicola Maniero (on loan from Padova)
—	FW	ITA	Umberto Nappello (from Potenza, free transfer)
—	MF	SLO	Armin Bačinović (from Maribor)
—	MF	SLO	Josip Iličić (from Maribor)
—	MF	BRA	João Pedro (from Atlético Mineiro)
—	MF	ISR	Eran Zahavi (from Tel-Aviv)
—	FW	PAR	Daniel Jara Martínez (from Club Nacional)

Out

—	MF	BRA	Fábio Simplício (end of contract, to Roma)
—	MF	AUS	Mark Bresciano (end of contract, to Lazio)
—	FW	ITA	Marco Giovio (to Grosseto, co-ownership)
—	DF	ITA	Antonio Mazzotta (to Lecce, co-ownership)
—	MF	ITA	Giovanni Tedesco (retired)
—	DF	DEN	Simon Kjær (to VfL Wolfsburg)
—	DF	ITA	Alberto Cossentino (to Novara, co-ownership)

Out on loan

—	FW	ITA	Davide Lanzafame (to Juventus)
—	FW	ITA	Davis Curiale (to Crotone)
—	DF	ITA	Andrea Raggi (to Bari)
—	DF	ITA	Emanuele Terranova (to Frosinone)
—	MF	ITA	Daniele Conti (to Südtirol)
—	DF	SUI	Michel Morganella (to Novara)
—	GK	ALB	Samir Ujkani (to Novara)
—	MF	ITA	Karim Laribi (to Foggia)
—	FW	ALB	Edgar Çani (to Modena)
—	FW	URU	Edinson Cavani (to Napoli)
—	DF	ITA	Samuele Romeo (to Alessandria)
—	DF	ITA	Eros Pellegrini (to Pavia)
—	MF	ITA	Roberto Guana (to Chievo)
—	MF	ARG	Nicolás Bertolo (to Real Zaragoza)
—	FW	ITA	Davide Succi (to Padova)
—	DF	ITA	Daniel Cappelletti (to Padova)
—	DF	ITA	Hernán Paolo Dellafiore (to Parma)
—	DF	ITA	Andrea Adamo (to Reggiana)
—	FW	CRO	Igor Budan (to Cesena)
—	GK	BRA	Rubinho (to Torino)
—	GK	ITA	Giuseppe Ingrassia (to Pergocrema)
—	MF	ITA	Salvatore Temperino (to Canavese)

=== Confirmed winter transfer market bids ===
In

—	DF	SLO	Siniša Anđelković (from Maribor)
—	DF	SLO	Jasmin Kurtić (from Gorica)
—	FW	ITA	Michele Paolucci (on loan from Siena)
—	FW	ALB	Jurgen Hoxha (from L'Aquila)

Out

—	MF	ITA	Maurizio Ciaramitaro (released)
—	FW	ITA	Massimo Maccarone (to Sampdoria)

Out on loan

—	DF	POL	Kamil Glik (at Bari)
—	MF	ITA	Nicola Rigoni (at Vicenza)
—	MF	BRA	João Pedro (at Vitória Guimarães)
—	FW	ITA	Paolo Carbonaro (loan return from Barletta, to Gela)

== Squad stats ==
Updated 22 May 2011

No.	Pos	Nat	Player	Total		Serie A		Europa League		Coppa Italia	
No.	Pos	Nat	Player	Apps	Goals	Apps	Goals	Apps	Goals	Apps	Goals
12	GK	(Italy) ITA	Giacomo Brichetto	0	0	0	0	0	0	0	0
46	GK	(Italy) ITA	Salvatore Sirigu	43	-70	37	-62	3	-6	3	-2
99	GK	(Italy) ITA	Francesco Benussi	6	-9	1	-1	5	-8	0	0
3	DF	(Romania) ROU	Dorin Goian	20	1	16	1	3	0	1	0
5	DF	(Italy) ITA	Cesare Bovo	42	4	32	4	7	0	3	0
6	DF	(Argentina) ARG	Ezequiel Muñoz	40	1	34	0	4	1	2	0
16	DF	(Italy) ITA	Mattia Cassani	42	0	32	0	7	0	3	0
29	DF	(Argentina) ARG	Santiago García	7	0	3	0	3	0	1	0
36	DF	(Italy) ITA	Matteo Darmian	16	0	11	0	4	0	1	0
42	DF	(Italy) ITA	Federico Balzaretti	42	2	33	2	7	0	2	0
66	DF	(Slovenia) SLO	Siniša Anđelković	8	0	7	0	0	0	1	0
80	DF	(Italy) ITA	Moris Carrozzieri	1	0	1	0	0	0	0	0
95	DF	(Italy) ITA	Giuseppe Prestia	1	0	0	0	1	0	0	0
4	MF	(Switzerland) SUI	Pajtim Kasami	24	0	14	0	8	0	2	0
8	MF	(Italy) ITA	Giulio Migliaccio	44	3	35	2	6	1	3	0
11	MF	(Italy) ITA	Fabio Liverani	18	0	12	0	5	0	1	0
21	MF	(Slovenia) SLO	Armin Bačinović	34	2	33	2	0	0	1	0
23	MF	(Italy) ITA	Antonio Nocerino	47	4	38	4	6	0	3	0
27	MF	(Argentina) ARG	Javier Pastore	43	13	35	11	6	1	2	1
72	MF	(Slovenia) SLO	Josip Iličić	37	8	34	8	0	0	3	0
77	MF	(Slovenia) SLO	Jasmin Kurtić	5	1	4	1	0	0	1	0
92	MF	(Italy) ITA	Francesco Ardizzone	1	0	0	0	1	0	0	0
94	MF	(Ghana) GHA	Afriyie Acquah	12	0	11	0	0	0	1	0
9	FW	(Uruguay) URU	Abel Hernández	27	8	22	3	4	4	1	1
10	FW	(Italy) ITA	Fabrizio Miccoli (captain)	27	10	21	9	3	0	3	1
22	FW	(Italy) ITA	Michele Paolucci	1	0	1	0	0	0	0	0
51	FW	(Chile) CHI	Mauricio Pinilla	29	9	22	8	6	1	1	0
90	FW	(Paraguay) PAR	Daniel Jara Martínez	1	0	0	0	0	0	1	0
98	FW	(Italy) ITA	Gabriele Zerbo	1	0	0	0	1	0	0	0
Players sold or loaned out during the winter transfer market:
25	DF	(Poland) POL	Kamil Glik	4	0	0	0	4	0	0	0
7	MF	(Brazil) BRA	João Pedro	4	0	1	0	3	0	0	0
24	MF	(Italy) ITA	Nicola Rigoni	9	1	4	0	5	1	0	0
32	FW	(Italy) ITA	Massimo Maccarone	26	5	18	2	8	3	0	0

== Match results ==
=== Legend ===
Win	Draw	Loss

=== Serie A ===
Date and time	Opponent	Venue	Result	Scorers	Attendance	Report
28 August 2010 – 20:45	Cagliari	Home	Drew 0–0		28,612	1, 2
12 September 2010 – 12:30	Brescia	Away	Lost 2–3	Pastore, Balzaretti	~ 7,000	1, 2
19 September 2010 – 15:00	Inter	Home	Lost 1–2	Iličić	27,291	1, 2
23 September 2010 – 20:45	Juventus	Away	Won 3–1	Pastore, Iličić, Bovo	~ 16,000	1, 2
26 September 2010 – 15:00	Lecce	Home	Drew 2–2	Pinilla, Maccarone	22,378	1, 2
3 October 2010 – 15:00	Fiorentina	Away	Won 2–1	Iličić, Pastore	~ 35,000	1, 2
17 October 2010 – 15:00	Bologna	Home	Won 4–1	Pastore, Iličić, Pinilla, Bačinović	23,587	1, 2
24 October 2010 – 15:00	Udinese	Away	Lost 1–2	Pinilla	~ 20,000	1, 2
27 October 2010 – 12:30	Lazio	Home	Lost 0–1		29,539	1, 2
31 October 2010 – 20:45	Genoa	Home	Won 1–0	Pinilla	24,368	1, 2
7 November 2010 – 20:45	Milan	Away	Lost 1–3	Bačinović	38,903	1, 2
21 November 2010 – 15:00	Catania	Home	Won 3–1	Pastore (3)	25,532	1, 2
28 November 2010 – 15:00	Cesena	Away	Won 2–1	Iličić, Miccoli	14,068	1, 2
4 December 2010 – 20:45	Roma	Home	Won 3–1	Miccoli, Iličić, Nocerino	29,691	1, 2
11 December 2010 – 20:45	Napoli	Away	Lost 0–1		~ 40,000	1, 2
18 December 2010 – 18:00	Parma	Home	Won 3–1	Pinilla, Miccoli, Kasami	~ 25,000	1, 2
6 January 2011 – 15:00	Torino	Away	Drew 1–1	Iličić	~ 15,000	1, 2
8 January 2011 – 15:00	Sampdoria	Home	Won 3–0	Miccoli, Migliaccio, Maccarone	26,020	1, 2
11 January 2011 – 15:00	Chievo	Away	Drew 0–0		9,800	1, 2
16 January 2011 – 12:30	Cagliari	Away	Lost 1–3	Pastore	~ 8,000	1, 2
22 January 2011 – 18:00	Brescia	Home	Won 1–0	Bovo	21,152	1, 2
30 January 2011 – 15:00	Inter	Away	Lost 2–3	Miccoli, Nocerino	?	1, 2
3 February 2011 – 20:45	Juventus	Home	Won 2–1	Miccoli, Migliaccio	25,972	1, 2
6 February 2011 – 15:00	Lecce	Away	Won 4–2	Miccoli, Pastore, Hernández, Iličić	~ 15,000	1, 2
13 February 2011 – 12:30	Fiorentina	Home	Lost 2–4	Pastore, Nocerino	24,571	1, 2
19 February 2011 – 18:00	Bologna	Away	Lost 0–1		~ 20,000	1, 2
27 February 2011 – 15:00	Udinese	Home	Lost 0–7		22,831	1, 2
6 March 2011 – 20:45	Lazio	Away	Lost 0–2		~ 25,000	1, 2
13 March 2011 – 15:00	Genoa	Away	Lost 0–1			1
19 March 2011 – 20:45	Milan	Home	Won 1–0	Goian	25,116	1
3 April 2011 – 15:00	Catania	Away	Lost 0–4		~ 25,000	1
10 April 2011	Cesena	Home	Drew 2–2	Kurtić, Pinilla		1
16 April 2011	Roma	Away	Won 3–2	Pinilla, Hernández (2)		1
23 April 2011	Napoli	Home	Won 2–1	Balzaretti, Bovo		1
1 May 2011	Parma	Away	Lost 1–3	Pastore		1
8 May 2011	Torino	Home	Won 2–1	Miccoli, Bovo		1
15 May 2011	Sampdoria	Away	Won 2–1	Miccoli, Pinilla		1
22 May 2011	Chievo	Home	Lost 1–3	Nocerino		1

=== Coppa Italia ===
Date and time	Round	Opponent	Venue	Result	Scorers	Attendance	Report
19 January 2011 – 17:30	Round of 16	Chievo	Home	Won 1–0	Miccoli	~ 8,000	1, 2
25 January 2011 – 21:00	Quarter-finals	Parma	Home	Won 0–0 (5–4 p)		15,335	1, 2
20 April 2011 – 20:45	Semi-finals – First leg	AC Milan	Away	Drew 2–2	Pastore, Hernández		1
11 May 2011 – 20:45	Semi-finals – Second leg	AC Milan	Home	Won 2–1	Migliaccio, Bovo	33,414	1
29 May 2011 – 20:45	Final	Internazionale	Olimpico, Rome	Lost 1–3	Muñoz	68,815	1

=== UEFA Europa League ===
Date and time	Round	Opponent	Venue	Result	Scorers	Attendance	Report
19 August 2010 – 20:30	1st round – 1st Leg	(Slovenia) Maribor	Home	Won 3–0	Maccarone, Hernández, Pastore	28,416	1, 2
26 August 2010 – 20:45	1st round – 2nd Leg	(Slovenia) Maribor	Away	Lost 2–3	Hernández (2)	~ 12,000	1, 2
16 September 2010 – 19:00	Group stage – Group F	(Czech Republic) Sparta Prague	Away	Lost 2–3	Maccarone, Hernández	13,766	1, 2
30 September 2010 – 21:00	Group stage – Group F	(Switzerland) FC Lausanne-Sport	Home	Won 1–0	Migliaccio	~ 10,000	1, 2
21 October 2010 – 21:00	Group stage – Group F	(Russia) PFC CSKA Moscow	Home	Lost 0–3		~ 10,000	1, 2
4 November 2010 – 19:00	Group stage – Group F	(Russia) PFC CSKA Moscow	Away	Lost 1–3	Maccarone	?	1, 2
25 November 2010 – 21:00	Group stage – Group F	(Czech Republic) Sparta Prague	Home	Drew 2–2	Rigoni, Pinilla	~ 10,000	1, 2
9 December 2010 – 19:00	Group stage – Group F	(Switzerland) FC Lausanne-Sport	Away	Won 1–0	Muñoz	?	1, 2
