= 2009–10 US Città di Palermo season =

Palermo
2009–10 season
- Chairman: Maurizio Zamparini
- Manager: Walter Zenga (until Week 13); Delio Rossi (from Week 14 onwards)
- Stadium: Stadio Renzo Barbera
- Serie A: 5th
- Coppa Italia: Fifth round
- Top goalscorer: League: Fabrizio Miccoli (19); All: Fabrizio Miccoli (22)
- Highest home attendance: 35,872 vs Sampdoria (9 May 2010, Serie A)
- Lowest home attendance: 18,817 vs Atalanta (10 January 2010, Serie A)
- Average home league attendance: 25,017
Home colours	Away colours	Third colours

U.S. Città di Palermo played the 2009–10 season in Serie A, the sixth consecutive season for the Sicilian club in the Italian top flight since their return to the league in 2004.

== Season overview ==
On 30 May 2009, hours before the final Serie A 2008–09 league game against Sampdoria, Palermo head coach Davide Ballardini announced he was taking a 10-day pause in order to decide with his future with the club. Later that day, Palermo chairman Maurizio Zamparini announced Ballardini had asked to be relieved from his position due to his unwillingness to keep on serving as Palermo head coach. This led Zamparini to start searching for a new head coach: successively, on 5 June, Palermo announced they had finished their search for a new boss by appointing outgoing Catania manager Walter Zenga. The choice was not appreciated by a large part of the Palermo fanbase, who rejected the idea of appointing the head coach who had just guided Sicilian rivals Catania in the previous season, also leading his side to an astonishing 4–0 win at Palermo, the biggest one for Catania against their rosanero rivals. Successively, Zamparini motivated the appointment of Zenga by saying he wanted a manager he regarded as fit to fulfil his own personal ambitions of a UEFA Champions League spot for the new season.

Since then, Zamparini started working on improving the current roster by a number of additions. Mirko Savini and Alberto Fontana's expiring contracts were not renewed, whereas Genoa applied an option to buy one half of Boško Janković rights, something that Sampdoria did not do on Andrea Raggi. The club was successively linked with Argentine players Nicolás Bertolo, Gabriel Paletta and Javier Pastore. Bertolo then announced on 17 June he had already agreed a permanent deal with Palermo which was set to be finalized later on July due to his ongoing involvement in the Clausura tournament. On 25 June, Zamparini announced he had also completed the signing of Javier Pastore, dubbed by him as "the new Kaká", stating the move will be officially announced at the end of the Clausura tournament; this was however successively denied by the player's agent. On 11 July, Palermo announced on its official website to have completed the signing of Pastore.

Several other outgoing moves involved youngsters from the Under-19 squad who had just won the Trofeo Giacinto Facchetti: Samuele Romeo was loaned to Lumezzane, Gianvito Misuraca was sold to Vicenza in a co-ownership bid (as part of a deal from Palermo in order to buy Nicola Rigoni from the biancorossi starting from the 2010–11 season), midfielder Salvatore Temperino to Rimini and goalkeeper Giuseppe Ingrassia loaned to Verona. Also, on 3 July Hernán Dellafiore returned from relegated Torino only to be loaned out again, this time to Parma. On 7 July Palermo announced to have loaned out midfielder Roberto Guana to Bologna. On 5 August, an exchange bid with Genoa was finalized, with first choice keeper Marco Amelia being transferred with the rossoblu club, and Rubinho joining the Sicilian side. On 7 August Palermo also finalized the signing of Romanian international Dorin Goian from Steaua. On 10 August young full-back Antonio Mazzotta, who had joined the first team during the pre-season phase, was then loaned out to Serie B outfit Lecce in order to gain some first team experience.

Zenga made his first press conference as Palermo boss on 8 July in Udine, in the eve of the start of the pre-season phase in the training camps of Sankt Veit and Bad Kleinkirchheim, Austria. In his first official appearances as new rosanero boss, Zenga surprised the press by declaring he wants to guide Palermo into winning the Serie A 2009–10 title. Palermo made their debut in front of its fans for a friendly tournament called Win Win Palermo and held at Stadio Renzo Barbera, against La Liga clubs RCD Mallorca and Sevilla FC, composed by three games of 45 minutes each; Palermo defeated Sevilla 1–0 in the first game, but then lost the following to Mallorca (who eventually won the tournament) in a 2–0 result. The rosanero side made their competitive debut on 15 August, in a third round 2009–10 Coppa Italia single-legged home game against Lega Pro Prima Divisione club SPAL 1907, which they won 4–2.

After an unimpressive start of season, with Palermo lying in twelfth place, on 23 November 2009 Palermo chairman Maurizio Zamparini announced to have dismissed Walter Zenga from the head coaching role; this followed a 1–1 home draw in the Derby di Sicilia against Catania which was received with massive disappointment by the rosanero supporters. He was replaced by former Lazio boss Delio Rossi.

Under the tenure of Delio Rossi, Palermo enjoyed a considerable improvement in results, achieving 17 points in his first eight games in charge, and seven consecutive league games without a defeat. These results also included a shock 2–0 win at Stadio San Siro against A.C. Milan, and a 3–0 clear home win against UEFA Champions League competitors ACF Fiorentina. On the other hand, Palermo's run in the Coppa Italia was already halted at the round of 16 by incumbent champions Lazio.

Another historic victory came on 28 February, as Palermo cruised to defeat Juventus again also in the return leg in Turin, with a 2–0 result provided by goals from Fabrizio Miccoli and Igor Budan. Such victory led Palermo up to fourth place, the last remaining spot to qualify for the 2010–11 UEFA Champions League. This prestigious victory was then followed by a record seventh consecutive home win in a game against Livorno, ended 1–0. Palermo lost the fourth place to Sampdoria in the final games of the season, after losing 2–0 the Sicilian derby to Catania, and only achieving a 2–2 draw at Cagliari and a 1–1 home draw to Sampdoria itself; in the latter game, team captain Fabrizio Miccoli got seriously injured in action with broken knee ligaments after a challenge that led to a penalty scored by Miccoli himself. Palermo ended the season in fifth place, completing the season with an injury-time 2–1 win to Atalanta.

Palermo will also have a number of players featuring in the 2010 FIFA World Cup: Javier Pastore with Argentina, Simon Kjær with Denmark, Edinson Cavani with Uruguay and out-of-contract Mark Bresciano with Australia. Two other players, Salvatore Sirigu and Mattia Cassani, were originally selected by Marcello Lippi to be part of a 28-player preliminary squad for Italy, but they did not make into the 23-player definitive squad in the end.

=== Confirmed summer transfer market bids ===
In

—	GK	ITA	Giacomo Brichetto (on loan from Novara)
—	DF	ROU	Dorin Goian (from Steaua)
—	MF	ARG	Javier Pastore (from Talleres)
—	MF	ARG	Nicolás Bertolo (from Banfield)
—	DF	ROU	Cristian Melinte (free transfer)
—	GK	ITA	Salvatore Sirigu (loan return from Ancona)
—	GK	BRA	Rubinho (from Genoa)
—	MF	ITA	Manuele Blasi (on loan from Napoli)
—	DF	ITA	Karim Laribi (from Fulham)
—	MF	ITA	Nicola Rigoni (from Vicenza, co-ownership bid)

Out

—	GK	ITA	Federico Agliardi (loan return from Rimini, to Padova)
—	GK	ITA	Marco Amelia (to Genoa)
—	DF	ITA	Ciro Capuano (to Catania)
—	GK	ITA	Alberto Fontana (end of contract)
—	DF	ITA	Mirko Savini (end of contract)
—	MF	SRB	Boško Janković (to Genoa, co-ownership)
—	FW	ITA	Gianvito Misuraca (to Vicenza, co-ownership)
—	MF	ITA	Giuseppe Polito (to Südtirol, co-ownership)

Out on loan

—	GK	ITA	Giuseppe Ingrassia (to Verona)
—	GK	ALB	Samir Ujkani (to Novara)
—	DF	ITA	Alberto Cossentino (to Novara)
—	DF	ITA	Rosario Costantino (to Monopoli)
—	DF	ITA	Hernán Paolo Dellafiore (loan return from Torino, to Parma)
—	DF	ITA	Antonio Mazzotta (to Lecce)
—	DF	ITA	Samuele Romeo (to Lumezzane)
—	DF	ITA	Andrea Raggi (loan return from Sampdoria, to Bologna)
—	DF	ITA	Emanuele Terranova (loan return from Livorno, to Lecce)
—	MF	ITA	Roberto Guana (to Bologna)
—	MF	ITA	Nicola Rigoni (to Vicenza)
—	MF	ITA	Salvatore Temperino (to Rimini)
—	MF	ITA	Antonio Tranchina (to Monopoli)
—	MF	ITA	Luca Di Matteo (loan return from Cittadella, to Crotone)
—	MF	ITA	Maurizio Ciaramitaro (loan return from Salernitana, to AC Bellinzona)
—	FW	ALB	Edgar Çani (loan return from Ascoli, to Padova)
—	FW	ITA	Paolo Carbonaro (loan return from Monopoli, to Giulianova)
—	FW	ITA	Davis Curiale (loan return from Ravenna, to Cittadella)
—	FW	ITA	Davide Lanzafame (loan return from Bari, to Parma)
—	FW	ITA	Gianluca Palmiteri (to Celano)

== Transfers ==
=== In ===
—	MF	GHA	Afriyie Acquah (from D.C. United)
—	GK	ITA	Francesco Benussi (on loan from Lecce)
—	DF	ITA	Marco Calderoni (on loan from Piacenza)
—	GK	ITA	Andrea Caroppo (on loan from Brescia)
—	DF	CZE	Ondřej Čelůstka (on loan from Slavia Prague)
—	MF	ITA	Giovanni Cristofari (free transfer)
—	DF	ROU	Ionuţ Radu (from Chievo Verona)

=== Out ===
—	MF	ITA	Luca Di Matteo (loan return from Crotone, to Vicenza, co-ownership)

Out on loan

—	FW	ALB	Edgar Çani (loan return from Padova, to Piacenza)
—	MF	ITA	Daniele Conti (to Arezzo)
—	DF	ROU	Cristian Melinte (to Piacenza)
—	GK	BRA	Rubinho (to Livorno)
—	FW	ITA	Davide Succi (to Bologna)

== Players ==
=== Squad information ===
As of 31 May 2010

No.	Pos	Nat	Player	Total		Serie A		Coppa Italia	
No.	Pos	Nat	Player	Apps	Goals	Apps	Goals	Apps	Goals
1	GK	(Italy) ITA	Giacomo Brichetto	0	0	0	0	0	0
46	GK	(Italy) ITA	Salvatore Sirigu	33	-41	32	-39	1	-2
28	GK	(Italy) ITA	Francesco Benussi	0	0	0	0	0	0
3	DF	(Romania) ROU	Dorin Goian	14	0	14	0	0	0
5	DF	(Italy) ITA	Cesare Bovo	32	2	29	2	3	0
16	DF	(Italy) ITA	Mattia Cassani	40	0	37	0	3	0
24	DF	(Denmark) DEN	Simon Kjær	38	2	35	2	3	0
26	DF	(Switzerland) SUI	Michel Morganella	0	0	0	0	0	0
27	DF	(Italy) ITA	Marco Calderoni	1	0	1	0	0	0
42	DF	(Italy) ITA	Federico Balzaretti	36	1	34	1	2	0
89	DF	(Czech Republic) CZE	Ondřej Čelůstka	1	0	1	0	0	0
91	DF	(Italy) ITA	Andrea Adamo	0	0	0	0	0	0
4	MF	(Italy) ITA	Giovanni Tedesco	5	0	4	0	1	0
6	MF	(Argentina) ARG	Javier Pastore	37	3	34	3	3	0
8	MF	(Italy) ITA	Giulio Migliaccio	32	1	30	1	2	0
9	MF	(Italy) ITA	Antonio Nocerino	38	2	35	2	3	0
11	MF	(Italy) ITA	Fabio Liverani	23	0	21	0	2	0
14	MF	(Argentina) ARG	Nicolás Bertolo	23	0	21	0	2	0
18	MF	(Italy) ITA	Guido Davì	0	0	0	0	0	0
23	MF	(Australia) AUS	Mark Bresciano	20	1	18	1	2	0
30	MF	(Brazil) BRA	Fábio Simplício	30	4	27	3	3	1
88	MF	(Italy) ITA	Manuele Blasi	15	0	14	0	1	0
7	FW	(Uruguay) URU	Edinson Cavani	37	15	34	13	3	2
10	FW	(Italy) ITA	Fabrizio Miccoli (captain)	38	22	35	19	3	3
20	FW	(Croatia) CRO	Igor Budan	31	7	30	5	1	2
90	FW	(Uruguay) URU	Abel Hernández	21	7	21	7	0	0
99	FW	(Georgia (country)) GEO	Levan Mchedlidze	2	0	2	0	0	0
Players sold or loaned out during the winter transfer market:
83	GK	(Brazil) BRA	Rubinho	8	-11	6	-8	2	-3
21	DF	(Romania) ROU	Cristian Melinte	3	0	2	0	1	0
77	MF	(Italy) ITA	Daniele Conti	0	0	0	0	0	0
19	FW	(Italy) ITA	Davide Succi	5	0	5	0	0	0

== Competitions ==
=== Serie A ===
==== League table ====
Pos	Team	Pld	W	D	L	GF	GA	GD	Pts	Qualification or relegation
3	Milan	38	20	10	8	60	39	+21	70	Qualification to Champions League group stage
4	Sampdoria	38	19	10	9	49	41	+8	67	Qualification to Champions League play-off round
5	Palermo	38	18	11	9	59	47	+12	65	Qualification to Europa League play-off round
6	Napoli	38	15	14	9	50	43	+7	59	Qualification to Europa League play-off round
7	Juventus	38	16	7	15	55	56	−1	55	Qualification to Europa League third qualifying round

Source: Lega Calcio and Yahoo! Sport
Rules for classification: 1) points; 2) head-to-head points; 3) head-to-head goal difference; 4) head-to-head goals scored; 5) goal difference; 6) number of goals scored.

==== Results summary ====
Overall								Home						Away					
Pld	W	D	L	GF	GA	GD	Pts	W	D	L	GF	GA	GD	W	D	L	GF	GA	GD
38	18	11	9	59	47	+12	65	13	6	0	34	14	+20	5	5	9	25	33	−8

Last updated: 16 May 2010.
Source: Competitive matches

==== Results by round ====
Round	1	2	3	4	5	6	7	8	9	10	11	12	13	14	15	16	17	18	19	20	21	22	23	24	25	26	27	28	29	30	31	32	33	34	35	36	37	38
Ground	H	A	H	A	H	A	H	A	H	A	H	A	H	A	H	A	H	A	H	A	H	A	H	A	H	A	H	A	H	A	H	A	H	A	H	A	H	A
Result	W	L	D	L	D	D	W	W	W	L	D	L	D	L	W	W	W	D	W	D	W	L	W	L	W	W	W	L	D	D	W	L	W	D	W	W	D	W
Position	3	10	8	13	13	15	10	7	4	7	10	11	12	14	13	13	7	9	7	6	5	6	5	7	6	4	4	4	4	4	4	4	4	5	5	5	5	5

Updated to match(es) played on 16 May 2010. Source: Competitive matches
A = Away; H = Home; W = Win; D = Draw; L = Loss

==== Matches ====
Date	Opponent	Venue	Result	Scorers	Attendance	Position	Report
23 August 2009 – 20:45	Napoli	Home	Won 2–1	Cavani, Miccoli	31,236	3	1, 2
30 August 2009 – 20:45	Fiorentina	Away	Lost 0–1		24,576	10	1, 2
13 September 2009 – 15:00	Bari	Home	Drew 1–1	Budan	20,004	10	1, 2
20 September 2009 – 15:00	Parma	Away	Lost 0–1		~ 15,000	13	1, 2
23 September 2009 – 20:45	AS Roma	Home	Drew 3–3	Budan, Miccoli, Nocerino	21,111	13	1, 2
27 September 2009 – 15:00	Lazio	Away	Drew 1–1	Cavani	~ 25,000	15	1, 2
4 October 2009 – 20:45	Juventus	Home	Won 2–0	Cavani, Simplício	31,606	10	1, 2
18 October 2009 – 15:00	Livorno	Away	Won 2–1	Miccoli, Balzaretti	~ 12,000	7	1, 2
25 October 2009 – 15:00	Udinese	Home	Won 1–0	Bovo	21,034	4	1, 2
29 October 2009 – 20:45	Inter	Away	Lost 3–5	Miccoli, Hernández, Miccoli	53,261	7	1, 2
1 November 2009 – 20:45	Genoa	Home	Drew 0–0		25,624	10	1, 2
8 November 2009 – 15:00	Bologna	Away	Lost 1–3	Kjær	~ 15,000	12	1, 2
22 November 2009 – 15:00	Catania	Home	Drew 1–1	Migliaccio	25,082	12	1, 2
29 November 2009 – 15:00	Chievo	Away	Lost 0–1		~ 8,000	14	1, 2
6 December 2009 – 15:00	Cagliari	Home	Won 2–1	Budan, Kjær	18,963	13	1, 2
13 December 2009 – 15:00	AC Milan	Away	Won 2–0	Miccoli, Bresciano	39,253	13	1, 2
20 December 2009 – 15:00	Siena	Home	Won 1–0	Cavani	19,221	7	1, 2
6 January 2010 – 15:00	Sampdoria	Away	Drew 1–1	Cavani	~ 28,000	9	1, 2
10 January 2010 – 15:00	Atalanta	Home	Won 1–0	Cavani	18,817	7	1, 2
17 January 2010 – 20:45	Napoli	Away	Drew 0–0		~ 60,000	6	1, 2
24 January 2010 – 15:00	Fiorentina	Home	Won 3–0	Hernández (2), Budan	21,585	5	1, 2
31 January 2010 – 18:00	Bari	Away	Lost 2–4	Cavani, Pastore	~ 25,000	5	1, 2
7 February 2009 – 18:00	Parma	Home	Won 2–1	Cavani, Simplício	22,252	5	1, 2
14 February 2010 – 18:00	AS Roma	Away	Lost 1–4	Miccoli	~ 35,000	7	1, 2
21 February 2010 – 15:00	Lazio	Home	Won 3–1	Hernández, Miccoli, Nocerino	23,104	6	1, 2
28 February 2010 – 20:45	Juventus	Away	Won 2–0	Miccoli, Budan	~ 18,000	4	1, 2
7 March 2010 – 15:00	Livorno	Home	Won 1–0	Miccoli	25,108	4	1, 2
14 March 2010 – 15:00	Udinese	Away	Lost 2–3	Simplício, Cavani	?	4	1, 2
21 March 2010 – 20:45	Inter	Home	Drew 1–1	Cavani	35,753	4	1, 2
24 March 2010 – 20:45	Genoa	Away	Drew 2–2	Hernández, Pastore	~ 22,000	4	1, 2
27 March 2010 – 20:45	Bologna	Home	Won 3–1	Miccoli (3)	27,092	4	1, 2
3 April 2010 – 19:00	Catania	Away	Lost 0–2		?	4	1, 2
11 April 2010 – 15:00	Chievo	Home	Won 3–1	Pastore, Miccoli (2)	25,917	4	1, 2
18 April 2010 – 15:00	Cagliari	Away	Drew 2–2	Miccoli, Hernández	~ 15,000	5	1, 2
24 April 2010 – 20:45	AC Milan	Home	Won 3–1	Bovo, Hernández, Miccoli	25,695	5	1, 2
2 May 2010 – 15:00	Siena	Away	Won 2–1	Cavani, Miccoli	~ 11,000	5	1, 2
9 May 2010 – 15:00	Sampdoria	Home	Drew 1–1	Miccoli	35,872	5	1, 2
16 May 2010 – 15:00	Atalanta	Away	Won 2–1	Cavani (2)	12,147	5	1, 2

=== Coppa Italia ===
Date	Round	Opponent	Venue	Result	Scorers	Attendance	Report
15 August 2009 – 20:30	Third Round	SPAL	Home	Won 4–2	Miccoli (2), Simplício, Cavani		Report
26 November 2009 – 20:30	Fourth Round	Reggina	Home	Won 4–1	Miccoli, Cavani, Budan (2)		Report
14 January 2010 – 21:00	Fifth Round	Lazio	Away	Lost 0–2		~ 10,000	1, 2
