= Cristofari =

Cristofari is an Italian surname. Notable people with the surname include:

- Fabio Cristofari (died 1689), Italian Baroque painter
- Giovanni Cristofari (born 1993), Italian footballer
- Jacques Cristofari (born 1978), French footballer
- Pietro Paolo Cristofari (1685–1743), Italian artist
