= Rubinho =

Rubinho may refer to:

- Rubens Barrichello (born 1972), nicknamed "Rubinho", Brazilian Formula One racing driver
- Rubinho (footballer) (born 1982), Brazilian football goalkeeper Rubens Fernando Moedim
