= Salvatore Sirigu =

Italian footballer (born 1987)

Salvatore Sirigu Cavaliere OMRI
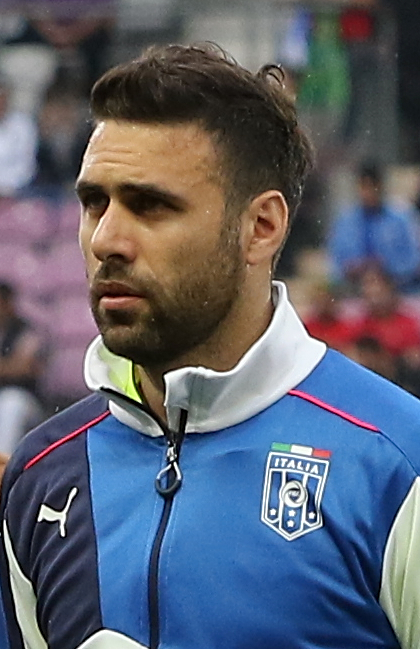
- Sirigu with Italy in 2015

Personal information
- Full name: Salvatore Sirigu
- Date of birth: 12 January 1987 (age 39)
- Place of birth: Nuoro, Italy
- Height: 1.92 m (6 ft 4 in)
- Position: Goalkeeper

Youth career
- 2002–2005: Venezia
- 2005–2007: Palermo

Senior career*
Years	Team	Apps	(Gls)
2006–2011	Palermo	69	(0)
2007–2008	→ Cremonese (loan)	20	(0)
2008–2009	→ Ancona (loan)	15	(0)
2011–2017	Paris Saint-Germain	145	(0)
2016–2017	→ Sevilla (loan)	2	(0)
2017	→ Osasuna (loan)	18	(0)
2017–2021	Torino	141	(0)
2021–2022	Genoa	37	(0)
2022–2023	Napoli	0	(0)
2023	Fiorentina	1	(0)
2023–2024	Nice	0	(0)
2024	Fatih Karagümrük	17	(0)
2024–2025	Palermo	3	(0)

International career^{‡}
2005	Italy U18	3	(0)
2005	Italy U19	2	(0)
2007–2009	Italy U21	3	(0)
2010–2021	Italy	28	(0)
Medal record
Men's Football
Representing Italy
UEFA European Championship
Winner	2020 Europe
Runner-up	2012 Poland–Ukraine
FIFA Confederations Cup
Third place	2013 Brazil
UEFA Nations League
Third place	2021 Italy
- * Club domestic league appearances and goals as of 24 July 2026 ‡ National team caps and goals as of 22:04, 8 September 2021 (UTC)

Salvatore Sirigu Cavaliere OMRI (Italian pronunciation: [salvaˈtoːre ˈsiːriɡu], Sardinian: [saɾβaˈðɔɾɛ ˈziɾiɣu]; born 12 January 1987) is an Italian professional footballer who plays as a goalkeeper.

Sirigu began his career with Venezia and then Palermo. In 2011, he moved to French side Paris Saint-Germain. Twice voted the Ligue 1 Goalkeeper of the Year, his honours at the club include four consecutive league titles and all four domestic competitions in both the 2014–15 and 2015–16 seasons. After spending the 2016–17 season in Spain on loan to Sevilla and Osasuna, Sirigu was signed by Torino in 2017. After playing 152 matches with the club, he then had brief spells at Genoa, Napoli and Fiorentina.

A former youth international, Sirigu made his senior debut for Italy in 2010, and was selected for the UEFA European Championship in 2012, 2016 and 2020, finishing as runner-up in 2012 and winning the 2020 tournament. He was also part of Italy's squads at the 2013 FIFA Confederations Cup (finishing in third place) and the 2014 FIFA World Cup.

== Club career ==
=== Early career ===
Born in Nuoro, Sardinia, Italy, Sirigu started his football career in Venezia's youth system playing as a midfielder. He was known for his powerful back heels, which he used to take penalty kicks. He had been training as an attacker for a local amateur side, Puri e Forti, at 11 years old when coaches concluded that his asthma condition would hinder him too much as an outfield player. Instead, observing Sirigu's extensive hands, they told him to have a go at the goal.

=== Palermo ===
In 2002, he joined Palermo's youth system. In the 2006–07 season, he made his debut as a starter in a Coppa Italia match against Sampdoria and a UEFA Cup match against Fenerbahçe. Palermo loaned him to Serie C1 club Cremonese on 12 July 2007 to gain some first team experience.

He spent the 2008–09 season on loan to Serie B side Ancona, but only played 15 games with his club, as Ancona managers Francesco Monaco, and later Sandro Salvioni preferred Brazilian Da Costa over him.

Sirigu successively returned to Palermo as a second-choice keeper, behind new signing Rubinho, for the 2009–10 season. Following a string of unimpressive performances by Rubinho, Palermo coach Walter Zenga, himself a former goalkeeper who was noted for his ability, elevated Sirigu to the starting role for the Week 6 game, an away match against Davide Ballardini's Lazio on 27 September 2009. The game, which also represented Sirigu's official debut in the Italian Serie A, ended in a 1–1 draw, with the young goalkeeper being nominated Man of the Match due to his numerous saves throughout the match. He was subsequently confirmed for the following game, where Sirigu managed to keep a clean sheet in a 2–0 win against Serie A giants Juventus. Since then, Sirigu was regularly featured in the starting line-up and permanently confirmed as the first-choice goalkeeper, leading the club to send Rubinho out on loan to Livorno later in January. Due to his performance during his time at Palermo, Sirigu earned the nickname "Walterino," a reference to his coach, Walter Zenga, who is regarded as one of the greatest goalkeepers of all time.

On 21 October 2009, Palermo announced to have agreed a contract extension with him, the new contract would have expired in June 2014. His final appearance for Palermo came in the 2011 Coppa Italia Final against Internazionale at Rome's Stadio Olimpico, a 3–1 loss.

=== Paris Saint-Germain ===
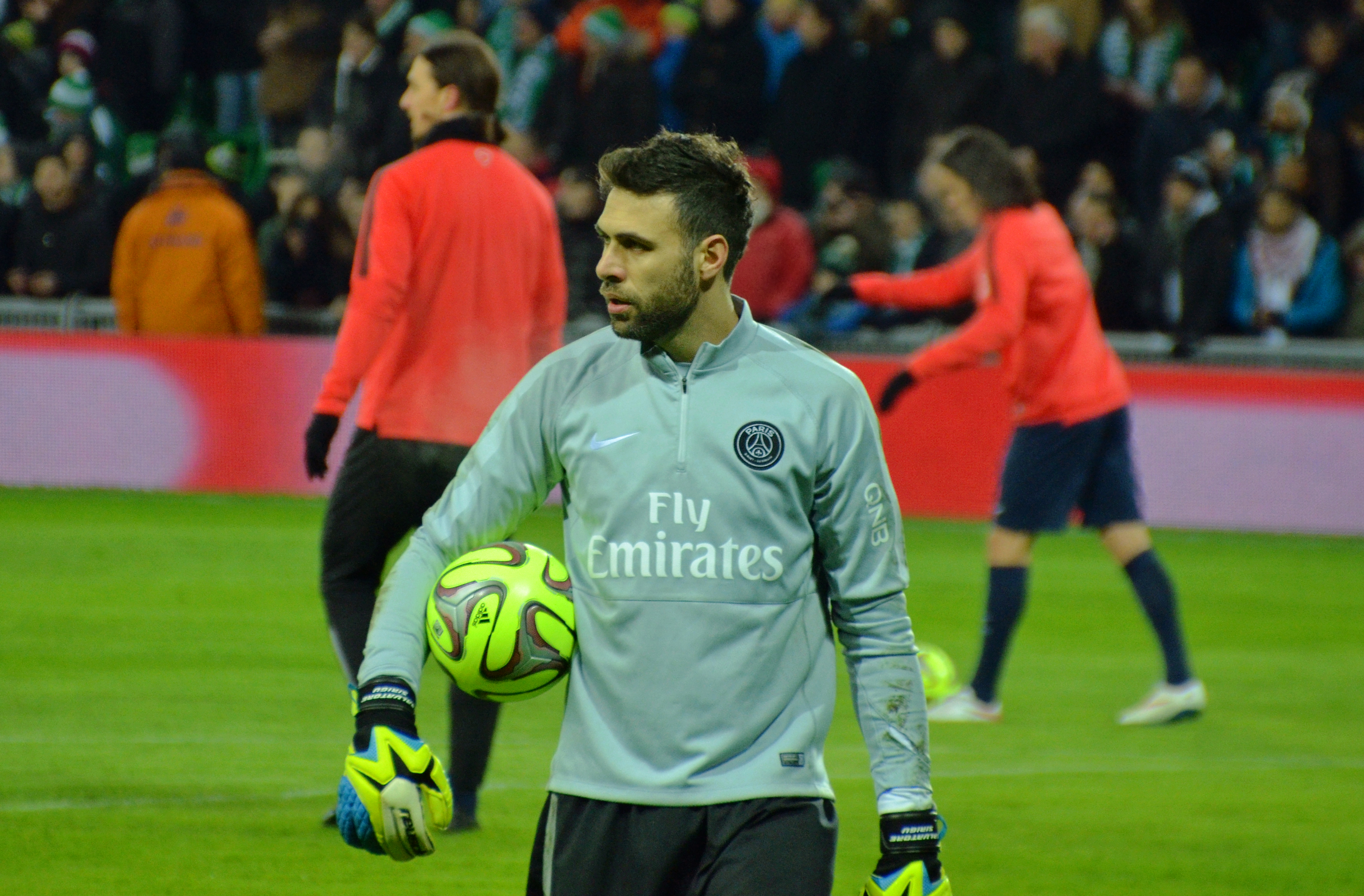
Sirigu warming up for Paris Saint-Germain before a match against AS Saint-Étienne in January 2015

On 28 July 2011, Sirigu signed a four-year contract with French club Paris Saint-Germain for a transfer fee of €3.895 million. Although initially signed as a reserve for Nicolas Douchez, Sirigu started all 38 Ligue 1 matches during his first season at the club as PSG finished as runners-up to Montpellier HSC.

On 27 January 2013, Sirigu broke Bernard Lama's clean-sheet record for a PSG goalkeeper in Ligue 1 (697 minutes). He became the first foreign player to be named UNFP's goalkeeper of the season as PSG won the 2012–13 Ligue 1 championship. Sirigu won the award for the second consecutive year in 2014, with PSG defending their league title and winning the Coupe de la Ligue.

On 2 August 2014, as PSG won the Trophée des Champions 2–0 against Guingamp at the Workers Stadium in Beijing, Sirigu saved a 32nd-minute penalty kick from Mustapha Yatabaré. He signed a contract extension on 10 September of the same year, lasting until 2018. Sirigu remained PSG's first choice goalkeeper in the 2014–15 season for Ligue 1 and UEFA Champions League matches, as the capital club won a domestic treble of the league championship, Coupe de France and Coupe de la Ligue, as well as reaching the quarter-finals of the Champions League.

After PSG completed the signing of German goalkeeper Kevin Trapp from Eintracht Frankfurt in July 2015, deputy sporting director Olivier Letang announced that the club "would not stand in [Sirigu's] way" if he wished to leave Paris. However, the player's agent denied that the player would leave the club. Sirigu remained PSG's first choice goalkeeper in the Coupe de France and Coupe de la Ligue, winning both titles, with Trapp taking his place as the preferred choice in Ligue 1 and UEFA Champions League matches. On 12 February 2016, he announced that he would have left PSG during the previous winter transfer window if "an important proposal had arrived", but ultimately remained with the club for the remainder of the season.

==== Loans to Sevilla and Osasuna ====
On 26 August 2016, Sirigu joined La Liga club Sevilla FC on a season-long loan. He made his debut with the club in a 1–1 away draw against Eibar on 17 September. A week later, away to Athletic Bilbao, he was sent off for elbowing Aritz Aduriz, leaving midfielder Vicente Iborra to unsuccessfully face the former's penalty in a 3–1 loss.

Having made only three appearances for the Andalusians, Sirigu moved to fellow league club, strugglers CA Osasuna on 31 January 2017 for the remainder of the season.

=== Torino ===
On 27 June 2017, Torino announced they had signed Sirigu on a free transfer. He made his debut for Torino on 12 August, in a 7–1 home win against Trapani in the Coppa Italia third round, and eight days later made a first Serie A appearance in a 1–1 draw away to Bologna.

In July 2018, when Sirigu had a year left on his contract, he extended it until June 2022. On 3 March 2019, he recorded his sixth consecutive Serie A clean sheet, thereby surpassing Luciano Castellini's club record of 517 minutes without conceding a goal in Serie A. On 15 July 2021, his contract with Torino was terminated by mutual consent.

=== Later career ===
On 3 August 2021, Sirigu joined Genoa, stating that his aim was to be chosen by Italy for the 2022 FIFA World Cup. Having missed only the last game of his one season at the Stadio Luigi Ferraris, he then joined Napoli on a free transfer.

Having not played at all for Napoli, Sirigu transferred to Fiorentina on 25 January 2023. After playing two games – one in the UEFA Europa Conference League – he suffered an Achilles tendon injury in March, ruling him out for an estimated six months; his contract was set to expire in June, but included a one-year extension option.

On 15 September 2023, Sirigu joined Ligue 1 side OGC Nice on a one-year deal.

On 16 January 2024, after failing to make an appearance during 124 days at Nice, Sirigu left the club and joined Turkish Süper Lig club Fatih Karagümrük. He left the club by the end of the season following the expiration of his contract.

On 24 August 2024, Sirigu signed a one-year deal with Serie B club Palermo, thus returning to the Rosanero thirteen years after his departure.

== International career ==
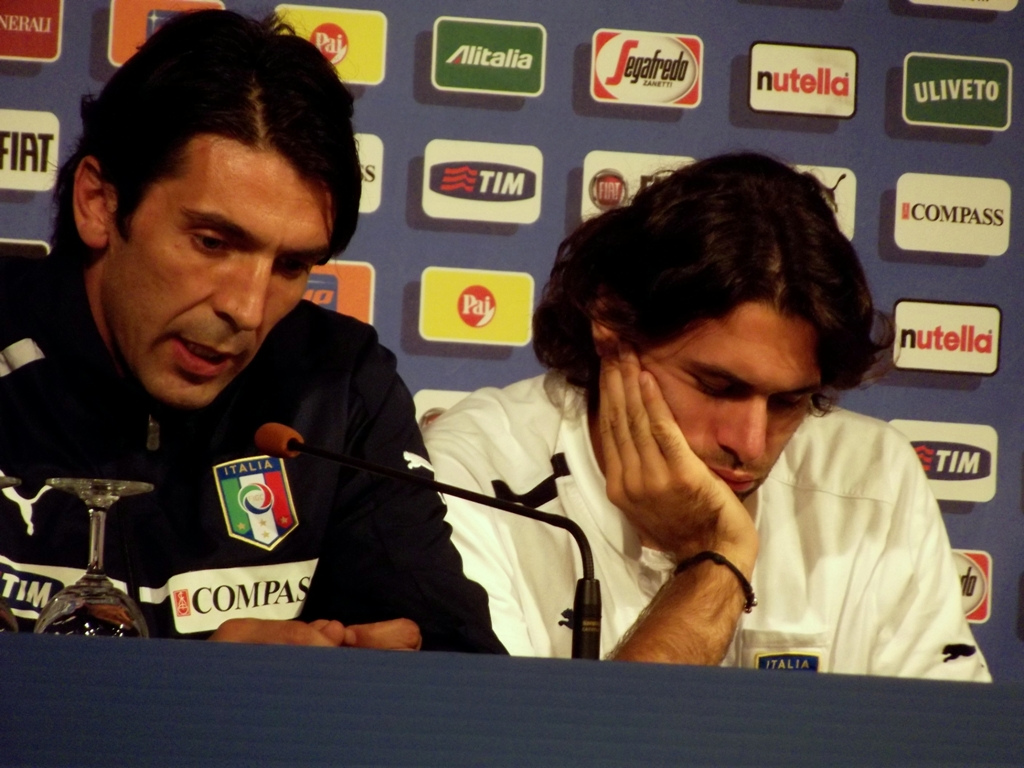
Gianluigi Buffon and Sirigu at a press conference during Euro 2012

=== Youth ===
Sirigu represented Italy at Under-18 and Under-19 levels. On 21 August 2007, he made his debut with the Italy U-21 squad under manager Pierluigi Casiraghi, in a 2–1 friendly victory against France held in La Spezia, coming on as a second-half substitute for Andrea Consigli. He took part at the 2009 UEFA European Under-21 Championship as the back up of starter Consigli.

=== Senior ===
==== Debut and UEFA Euro 2012 ====
On 28 February 2010, Sirigu received his first call-up for the Italy national team by manager Marcello Lippi for a friendly match versus Cameroon which was played at Stade Louis II, Monaco, but did not play, as Federico Marchetti was chosen to start. In May, he was included in Lippi's 28-man provisional 2010 FIFA World Cup squad, but was not included in the 23-man final squad for the tournament.

With Cesare Prandelli serving as national coach, Sirigu was named in his first squad list for the friendly match against Ivory Coast on 10 August 2010, in which the goalkeeper also debuted as Italy lost 1–0. On 3 September, he made his second appearance for the first competitive match, a 2–1 away victory against Estonia for Euro 2012 qualifying.

Sirigu was eventually selected to go to UEFA Euro 2012 as the third choice keeper of the Italian team, behind Gianluigi Buffon and Morgan De Sanctis; he did not feature in the tournament as Italy reached the final, losing out 4–0 to Spain.

==== 2013 FIFA Confederations Cup and 2014 FIFA World Cup ====
For the 2013 FIFA Confederations Cup, he was selected as the second-choice keeper behind Buffon. Shortly before the tournament, on 31 May, he kept his first international clean sheet as Italy beat San Marino 4–0 in a friendly match in Bologna. In the final tournament, he once again did not feature as Italy finished in third place, defeating Uruguay on penalties in the bronze medal match following a 2–2 draw.

Prandelli selected Sirigu as his second-choice goalkeeper for the 2014 FIFA World Cup. Due to an injury to starting goalkeeper Buffon, he started in the opening group match, and made several decisive saves which contributed to the 2–1 victory against England; this was his only appearance throughout the tournament. Following consecutive 1–0 defeats to Costa Rica and Uruguay, however, Italy finished in third place in their group, and were eliminated in the group stage for a second consecutive World Cup.

==== Later senior career ====
On 31 May 2016, Sirigu was included in Antonio Conte's 23-man Italy squad for UEFA Euro 2016. Due to a fever suffered by starting goalkeeper Buffon, Sirigu made his only appearance of the tournament on 22 June, in his country's final group match, a 1–0 defeat to the Republic of Ireland. Italy were eliminated from the tournament in the quarter-finals, following a penalty shoot-out loss against Germany.

After not featuring under manager Gian Piero Ventura in Italy's unsuccessful qualifying campaign for the 2018 FIFA World Cup, Sirigu returned to the national side under his successor Roberto Mancini, appearing in Italy's 3–1 friendly defeat to France in Nice on 1 June 2018; he went on to feature during Italy's Euro 2020 qualification campaign, conceding his only goal in qualifying in Italy's 2–1 home win over Bosnia and Herzegovina on 11 June 2019. On 11 November 2020, Sirigu made his first appearance as Italy captain, starting in a 4–0 friendly win over Estonia in Florence.

In June 2021, Sirigu was included in Italy's squad for the rescheduled UEFA Euro 2020 by manager Mancini. He made his only appearance of the tournament in Italy's final group match against Wales on 20 June, coming on as a late substitute for Gianluigi Donnarumma in the team's 1–0 victory in Rome, which saw them top their group. On 11 July, Sirigu won the European Championship with Italy following a 3–2 penalty shoot-out victory over England at Wembley Stadium in the final, following a 1–1 draw after extra time.

Sirigu was once again named Italy's second-choice goalkeeper for the 2021 UEFA Nations League Finals, where they finished in third place, beating out Belgium 2–1 in the bronze medal match.

== Style of play ==
Regarded as one of the best Italian goalkeepers of his generation, Sirigu was considered in the 2010s as the possible 'heir-apparent' of Gianluigi Buffon as Italy's first-choice goalkeeper, due to his consistency, physical strength, composure, strong mentality, explosive reflexes, and shot-stopping ability between the posts. Although he was frequently compared to Zenga in his youth, his former manager at Cremonese, Emiliano Mondonico, compared him to Dino Zoff because of his calm character under pressure. Former Italy goalkeeper Angelo Peruzzi has also praised Sirigu for his goalkeeping technique and ability to come off his line quickly to collect the ball. Sirigu is also known for his professionalism and leadership qualities, as well as his ability to motivate his teammates, and is therefore considered to be an influential dressing room personality, which makes him a popular figure with his teams' fans.

== Career statistics ==
=== Club ===
As of match played 26 January 2025

Appearances and goals by club, season and competition
Club	Season	League			National cup (Note: Includes Coppa Italia, Coppa Italia Serie C, Coupe de France, Copa del Rey, Turkish Cup)		League cup (Note: Includes Coupe de la Ligue)		Europe		Other		Total	
Club	Season	Division	Apps	Goals	Apps	Goals	Apps	Goals	Apps	Goals	Apps	Goals	Apps	Goals
Palermo	2006–07	Serie A	0	0	1	0	—		1 (Note: Appearance in UEFA Cup)	0	—		2	0
Palermo	2009–10	Serie A	32	0	1	0	—		—		—		33	0
Palermo	2010–11	Serie A	37	0	5	0	—		3 (Note: Appearance(s) in UEFA Europa League)	0	—		45	0
Palermo	Total		69	0	7	0	—		4	0	—		80	0
Cremonese (loan)	2007–08	Serie C1	20	0	2	0	—		—		3 (Note: Appearances in Serie C1 promotion play-offs)	0	25	0
Ancona (loan)	2008–09	Serie B	15	0	0	0	—		—		—		15	0
Paris Saint-Germain	2011–12	Ligue 1	38	0	2	0	0	0	1	0	—		41	0
Paris Saint-Germain	2012–13	Ligue 1	33	0	0	0	0	0	10 (Note: Appearances in UEFA Champions League)	0	—		43	0
Paris Saint-Germain	2013–14	Ligue 1	37	0	0	0	1	0	10	0	1 (Note: Appearance in Trophée des Champions)	0	49	0
Paris Saint-Germain	2014–15	Ligue 1	34	0	0	0	0	0	10	0	1	0	45	0
Paris Saint-Germain	2015–16	Ligue 1	3	0	6	0	3	0	0	0	0	0	12	0
Paris Saint-Germain	Total		145	0	8	0	4	0	31	0	2	0	190	0
Sevilla (loan)	2016–17	La Liga	2	0	1	0	—		0	0	0	0	3	0
Osasuna (loan)	2016–17	La Liga	18	0	0	0	—		—		—		18	0
Torino	2017–18	Serie A	37	0	1	0	—		—		—		38	0
Torino	2018–19	Serie A	36	0	2	0	—		—		—		38	0
Torino	2019–20	Serie A	36	0	2	0	—		6	0	—		44	0
Torino	2020–21	Serie A	32	0	0	0	—		—		—		32	0
Torino	Total		141	0	5	0	—		6	0	—		152	0
Genoa	2021–22	Serie A	37	0	0	0	—		—		—		37	0
Napoli	2022–23	Serie A	0	0	0	0	—		0	0	—		0	0
Fiorentina	2022–23	Serie A	1	0	0	0	—		1 (Note: Appearance in UEFA Europa Conference League)	0	—		2	0
Nice	2023–24	Ligue 1	0	0	0	0	—		—		—		0	0
Fatih Karagümrük	2023–24	Süper Lig	17	0	2	0	—		—		—		19	0
Palermo	2024–25	Serie B	3	0	1	0	—		—		0	0	4	0
Career total			468	0	26	0	4	0	42	0	5	0	545	0

=== International ===
Appearances and goals by national team and year
National team	Year	Apps	Goals
Italy	2010	2	0
Italy	2011	0	0
Italy	2012	2	0
Italy	2013	3	0
Italy	2014	4	0
Italy	2015	4	0
Italy	2016	2	0
Italy	2017	0	0
Italy	2018	2	0
Italy	2019	5	0
Italy	2020	2	0
Italy	2021	2	0
Total		28	0

== Honours ==
Paris Saint-Germain

- Ligue 1: 2012–13, 2013–14, 2014–15, 2015–16
- Coupe de France: 2014–15, 2015–16
- Coupe de la Ligue: 2013–14, 2014–15, 2015–16
- Trophée des Champions: 2013, 2014, 2015, 2016

Italy

- UEFA European Championship: 2020; runner-up: 2012
- FIFA Confederations Cup third place: 2013
- UEFA Nations League third place: 2020–21

Individual

- Ligue 1 Team of the Year: 2012–13, 2013–14
- Ligue 1 Goalkeeper of the Year: 2012–13, 2013–14

Orders

- 5th Class / Knight: Ufficiale Ordine al Merito della Repubblica Italiana: (2021)
