= Nicolás Bertolo =

Argentine footballer (born 1986)

Personal information
- Full name: Nicolás Santiago Bertolo
- Date of birth: 2 January 1986 (age 40)
- Place of birth: Córdoba, Argentina
- Height: 1.79 m (5 ft 10 in)
- Position: Winger

Team information
- Current team: Fénix

Youth career
- Instituto
- Boca Juniors

Senior career*
Years	Team	Apps	(Gls)
2006–2008	Boca Juniors	10	(1)
2008	→ Nacional (loan)	15	(3)
2008–2009	Banfield	35	(8)
2009–2012	Palermo	56	(3)
2010–2011	→ Real Zaragoza (loan)	36	(5)
2012–2014	Cruz Azul	15	(2)
2013–2014	→ Banfield (loan)	39	(7)
2014–2015	Banfield	25	(6)
2015–2017	River Plate	15	(0)
2016–2017	→ Banfield (loan)	25	(7)
2017–2021	Banfield	44	(3)
2021–2022	Platense	34	(1)
2022–2023	Banfield	18	(0)
2024–	Fénix	12	(1)

International career
2011–	Argentina	2	(0)
- * Club domestic league appearances and goals as of 20 September 2024

Nicolás Santiago Bertolo (born 2 January 1986) is an Argentinian professional footballer who plays as a winger for Fénix in Primera B Metropolitana. His nickname is El Cordobés.

== Career ==
=== Club ===
Bertolo was born in Córdoba, and came through the Boca Juniors youth system to make his professional debut on 10 January 2006 in a 3–2 win over Velez Sarsfield. In 2007 he was part of the Boca Juniors squad that won Copa Libertadores.

In 2008, Bertolo was loaned to Uruguayan club Nacional where he scored 3 goals in 15 appearances and in July 2008 he joined Banfield.

As a child Bertolo was a supporter of local side Instituto Atlético Central Córdoba but opted to join Boca Juniors instead. On 20 July 2009 Palermo acquired the Argentine midfielder from Banfield.

After a season as a backup player behind regulars Fabio Liverani, Antonio Nocerino and Giulio Migliaccio, Bertolo was sent on loan to Real Zaragoza of La Liga in August 2010, with an option for the Spanish club to sign him permanently at the end of the season. He ended the season with 36 appearances and 5 goals, but Zaragoza ultimately opted not to acquire the player, leading him to a return to Palermo. Scored his first goal in rosanero on 21 September 2011 against Cagliari, in a Serie A match.

On 29 December 2012 he moved to the Mexican club Cruz Azul. On 8 August 2013 he returned to Banfield, initially on loan, before joining River Plate two years later and won the Copa Libertadores within his first few games for the club. However, after fifteen appearances in two seasons for River Plate he found himself back with Banfield, joining on loan in 2016.

=== International ===
He made his International debut on 1 June 2011 against Nigeria in a 4–1 defeat. Played against Poland four days from the first minute.

== Honours ==
Boca Juniors

- Argentine Primera División: 2005–06 Clausura
- Copa Libertadores: 2007

Cruz Azul

- Copa MX: 2012–13 Clausura

Banfield

- Primera B Nacional: 2013–14

River Plate

- Copa Libertadores: 2015
- Suruga Bank Championship: 2015
