= 2010–11 in Italian football =

The 2010–11 season was the 109th season of competitive football in Italy.

== Promotions and relegations (pre-season) ==
Teams promoted to Serie A

- Lecce
- Cesena
- Brescia

Teams relegated from Serie A

- Atalanta
- Siena
- Livorno

Teams promoted to Serie B

- Novara
- Pescara
- Portogruaro
- Varese

Teams relegated from Serie B

- Ancona
- Mantova
- Gallipoli
- Salernitana

== Honours ==
Competition	Winner	Details	At
Serie A	Milan (18th title)	2010–11 Serie A	
Coppa Italia	Inter (7th title)	2010–11 Coppa Italia; Beat Palermo 3–1	Stadio Olimpico
Serie B	Atalanta	2010–11 Serie B	
Supercoppa Italiana	Inter (5th title)	2010 Supercoppa Italiana; Beat Roma 3–1	San Siro

== Italy national football team ==
=== Euro 2012 qualification ===
3 September 2010	Estonia	1–2	Italy	A. Le Coq Arena, Tallinn
20:30 CEST	Zenjov 31'; Vunk (yellow card) 56'; Klavan (yellow card) 85'; Piiroja (yellow card) 90+7'	Report	60' Cassano; 63' Bonucci	Attendance: 9,000; Referee: (Spain) Carlos Velasco Carballo

7 September 2010	Italy	5–0	Faroe Islands	Stadio Artemio Franchi, Florence
20:50 CEST	Gilardino 11'; De Rossi 22'; Cassano 27'; Quagliarella 81'; Pirlo 90'	Report	(yellow card) 7' Davidsen	Attendance: 19,266; Referee: (Belarus) Aleksei Kulbaov

8 October 2010	Northern Ireland	0–0	Italy	Windsor Park, Belfast
20:45 CEST		Report		Attendance: 15,150; Referee: (France) Tony Chapron

12 October 2010	Italy	3–0 (awarded)	Serbia	Stadio Luigi Ferraris, Genoa
20:50 CEST		Report	(yellow card) 3' Rajković	Referee: (Scotland) Craig Thomson

25 March 2011	Slovenia	0–1	Italy	Stožice Stadium, Ljubljana
20:45 CET	Cesar (yellow card) 80'	Report	(yellow card) 55' Montolivo; 73' (yellow card) 90+1' Thiago Motta	Referee: (Germany) Felix Brych

3 June 2011	Italy	3–0	Estonia	Stadio Alberto Braglia, Modena
20:45 CEST	Aquilani (yellow card) 8'; Rossi 21'; Cassano 39'; Pazzini 68'	Report	(yellow card) 42' Klavan; (yellow card) 54' Vunk	Referee: (Romania) Alexandru Tudor

=== Friendlies ===
10 August 2010	Italy	0–1	Ivory Coast	Boleyn Ground, London, England
20:45 CEST	Bonucci (yellow card) 83'	Report	(yellow card) 35' Eboué; 55' K. Touré	Attendance: 11,177; Referee: (England) Martin Atkinson

17 November 2010	Romania	1–1	Italy	Hypo-Arena, Klagenfurt, Austria
20:45 CET	Torje (yellow card) 32'; Marica 34'	Report	(yellow card) 38' Balzaretti; (yellow card) 56' Santon; 82' (o.g.) Marica; (yellow card) 86' Aquilani	Attendance: 3,000; Referee: (Austria) Thomas Einwaller

9 February 2011	Germany	1–1	Italy	Westfalenstadion, Dortmund
20:50 CET	Klose 16'	Report	(yellow card) 35' Thiago Motta; 80' G. Rossi	Attendance: 60,196; Referee: (Netherlands) Eric Braamhaar

29 March 2011	Ukraine	0–2	Italy	Lobanovsky Dynamo Stadium, Kyiv
20:45 CEST	Oshchypko (yellow card) 11'	Report	27' Rossi; (yellow card) 64' Gastaldello; (yellow card) 19' (yellow-red card) 73' Astori; 81' Matri	Referee: (Russia) Alexei Nikolaev

7 June 2011	Italy	0–2	Republic of Ireland	Stade Maurice Dufrasne, Liège, Belgium
20:45 CEST		Report	(yellow card) 22' Hunt; (yellow card) 31' (goal) 36' Andrews; 89' Cox	Referee: (Belgium) Serge Gumienny

== Italian club's performance in Europe ==
These are the results of the Italian teams in European competitions during the 2010–11 season. (Italian team score displayed first)

Team	Contest and round	Opponent	1st leg score*	2nd leg score**	Aggregate score
Internazionale	Champions League Group Stage	(Netherlands) Twente	1–0	2–2	None
Internazionale	Champions League Group Stage	(Germany) Werder Bremen	4–0	0–3	None
Internazionale	Champions League Group Stage	(England) Tottenham	4–3	1–3	None
Internazionale	Champions League Round of 16	(Germany) Bayern Munich	0–1 (H)	3–2 (A)	W 3–3 (Away goals rule)
Internazionale	Champions League Quarterfinals	(Germany) Schalke 04	2–5 (H)	1–2 (A)	L 3–7
Roma	Champions League Group Stage	(Germany) Bayern Munich	3–2	0–2	None
Roma	Champions League Group Stage	(Romania) CFR Cluj	2–1	1–1	None
Roma	Champions League Group Stage	(Switzerland) Basel	1–3	3–2	None
Roma	Champions League Round of 16	(Ukraine) Shakhtar Donetsk	2–3 (H)	0–3 (A)	L 2–6
Milan	Champions League Group Stage	(France) Auxerre	2–0	2–0	None
Milan	Champions League Group Stage	(Netherlands) Ajax	0–2	1–1	None
Milan	Champions League Group Stage	(Spain) Real Madrid	2–2	0–2	None
Milan	Champions League Round of 16	(England) Tottenham	0–1 (H)	0–0 (A)	L 0–1
Sampdoria	Champions League Play-off Round	(Germany) Werder Bremen	1–3 (A)	3–2 (H)	L 4–5
Sampdoria	Europa League Group Stage	(Netherlands) PSV Eindhoven	1–2	1–1	None
Sampdoria	Europa League Group Stage	(Hungary) Debrecen	1–0	0–2	None
Sampdoria	Europa League Group Stage	(Ukraine) Metalist Kharkiv	0–0	1–2	None
Palermo	Europa League Play-off Round	(Slovenia) Maribor	3–0 (H)	2–3 (A)	W 5–3
Palermo	Europa League Group Stage	(Czech Republic) Sparta Prague	2–2	2–3	None
Palermo	Europa League Group Stage	(Switzerland) Lausanne-Sport	1–0	1–0	None
Palermo	Europa League Group Stage	(Russia) CSKA Moscow	0–3	1–3	None
Napoli	Europa League Play-off Round	(Sweden) Elfsborg	1–0 (H)	2–0 (A)	W 3–0
Napoli	Europa League Group Stage	(Netherlands) Utrecht	0–0	3–3	None
Napoli	Europa League Group Stage	(Romania) Steaua București	1–0	3–3	None
Napoli	Europa League Group Stage	(England) Liverpool	0–0	1–3	None
Napoli	Europa League Round of 32	(Spain) Villarreal	0–0 (H)	1–2 (A)	L 1–2
Juventus	Europa League Third Qual. Round	(Republic of Ireland) Shamrock Rovers	2–0 (A)	1–0 (H)	W 3–0
Juventus	Europa League Play-off Round	(Austria) Sturm Graz	2–1 (A)	1–0 (H)	W 3–1
Juventus	Europa League Group Stage	(Poland) Lech Poznań	3–3	1–1	None
Juventus	Europa League Group Stage	(England) Manchester City	1–1	1–1	None
Juventus	Europa League Group Stage	(Austria) Red Bull Salzburg	0–0	1–1	None

* For group games in Champions League or Europa League, score in home game is displayed
** For group games in Champions League or Europa League, score in away game is displayed
