= Cristian Melinte =

Romanian footballer

Personal information
- Full name: Cristian Costel Melinte
- Date of birth: 9 May 1988 (age 38)
- Place of birth: Timișoara, Romania
- Height: 1.83 m (6 ft 0 in)
- Position: Centre back

Youth career
- Fortuna Covaci
- 2009: Dinamo București

Senior career*
Years	Team	Apps	(Gls)
2005–2006	Auxerre Lugoj	15	(1)
2006–2008	UTA Arad	23	(0)
2007	→ CS Ineu (loan)	7	(0)
2009–2013	Palermo	2	(0)
2010	→ Piacenza (loan)	16	(0)
2011–2012	→ Petrolul Ploieşti (loan)	25	(0)
2012–2013	→ Astra Giurgiu (loan)	6	(0)
2013–2014	Concordia Chiajna	26	(0)
2014–2015	Politehnica Iași	3	(0)
2015–2019	Poli Timișoara	94	(1)
2016–2017	→ Concordia Chiajna (loan)	26	(0)
2019–2021	UTA Arad	56	(2)

International career^{‡}
	Romania U-19	2	(0)
2009	Romania U-21	1	(0)
- * Club domestic league appearances and goals as of 19:51, 14 June 2021 (UTC) ‡ National team caps and goals as of 19:51, 14 June 2021 (UTC)

Cristian Costel Melinte (born 9 May 1988) is a Romanian professional footballer who plays as a full back.

== Club career ==
He began his career at Fortuna Covaci, but just some months later he went to play for Auxerre Lugoj in Liga II. Then he joined UTA Arad in 2005, playing three times in his first season and four times in the following one, in Liga I. He then was sent on loan to CS Ineu and then returned to UTA Arad in early 2008 playing regularly with the side. In late 2008 he joined AS Monaco FC for an unsuccessful trial, and then left to join FC Dinamo București later in March 2009.

=== Career in Italy ===
He was acquired by Palermo in a free transfer in August 2009, after a successful trial with the Sicilians, being awarded a four-year contract with the rosanero club.

He made his debut on 29 October 2009, playing the first half in a Serie A game ended in a 3–5 away loss to Inter. After playing a Coppa Italia home game against Reggina, he was again featured in the Italian Serie A on 30 January 2010 as a replacement for injured Federico Balzaretti in an away game versus Bari. Melinte's performance was then verbally criticized by club chairman Maurizio Zamparini after the Romanian caused a penalty (then scored) with the game being 2–2, and then making a mistake that was instrumental in Bari's fourth goal. Two days later, he was sent out on loan to Serie B club Piacenza in switch with Marco Calderoni.

He returned at Palermo at the end of his loan spell, but no interested party was found and he was subsequently excluded from the first team. On 31 August 2011 he moved on loan to Petrolul Ploiești. On 3 July 2012, he was loaned to Astra Giurgiu, until the end of the season.
