= Antonio Nocerino =

Italian footballer (born 1985)

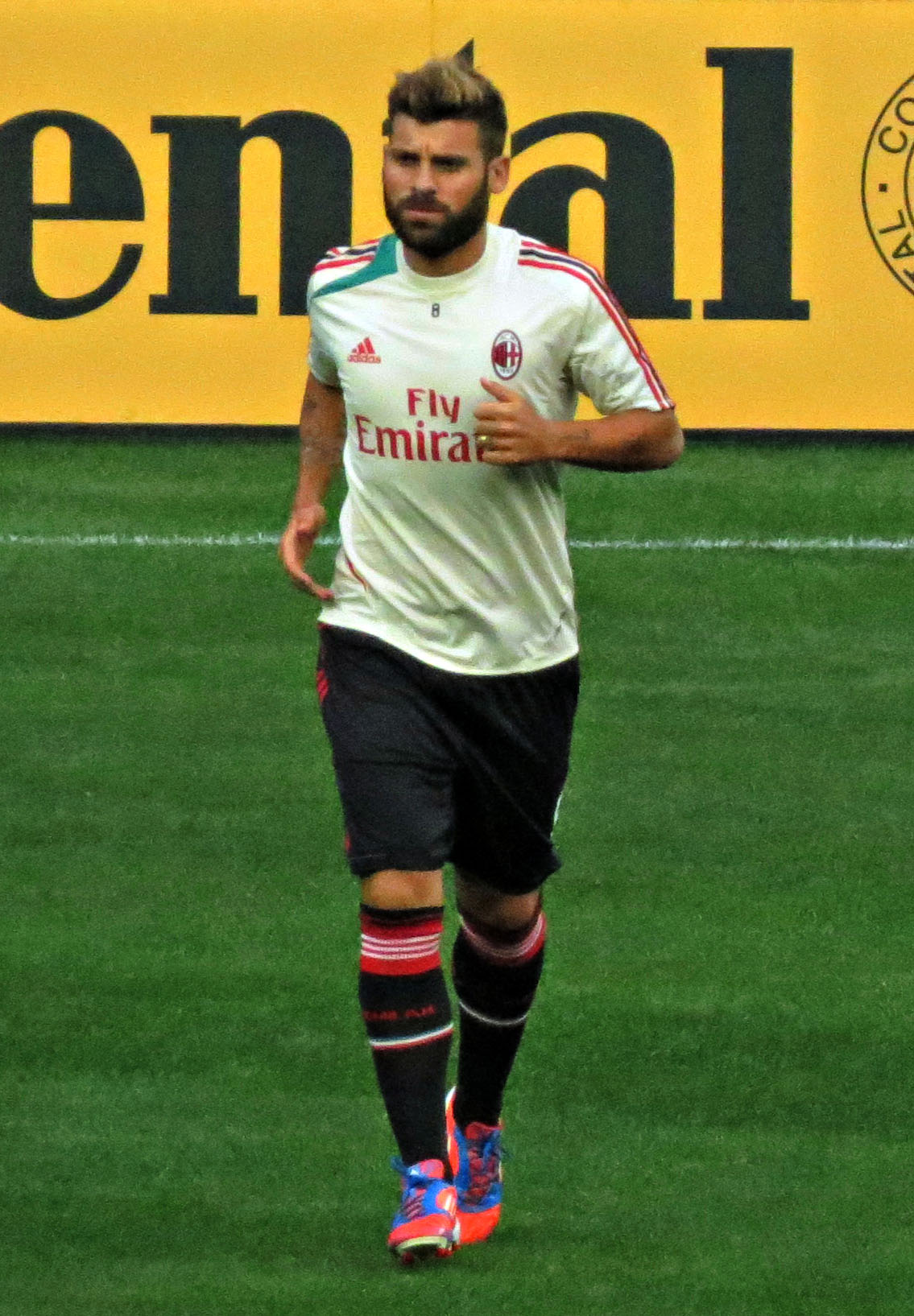
- Nocerino with AC Milan in 2012

Personal information
- Full name: Antonio Nocerino
- Date of birth: 9 April 1985 (age 41)
- Place of birth: Naples, Italy
- Height: 1.75 m (5 ft 9 in)
- Position: Midfielder

Youth career
- 1997–2003: Juventus

Senior career*
Years	Team	Apps	(Gls)
2003–2004	Juventus	0	(0)
2003–2004	→ Avellino (loan)	34	(0)
2004–2006	Genoa	5	(0)
2005	→ Catanzaro (loan)	21	(0)
2005–2006	→ Crotone (loan)	15	(0)
2006	→ Messina (loan)	11	(1)
2006–2007	Piacenza	37	(6)
2007–2008	Juventus	32	(0)
2008–2011	Palermo	106	(6)
2011–2016	AC Milan	74	(12)
2014	→ West Ham United (loan)	10	(0)
2014	→ Torino (loan)	5	(0)
2015	→ Parma (loan)	20	(3)
2016–2017	Orlando City	52	(1)
2018	Benevento	6	(0)
Total		428	(29)

International career
2004	Italy U19	7	(0)
2004–2005	Italy U20	16	(0)
2006–2007	Italy U21	9	(0)
2008	Italy U23	6	(0)
2008	Italy Olympic	3	(0)
2007–2012	Italy	15	(0)

Managerial career
- 2024: Miami FC
- 2025: Las Vegas Lights
Medal record
Men's Football
Representing Italy
UEFA European Championship
Runner-up	2012 Poland–Ukraine
- * Club domestic league appearances and goals

Antonio Nocerino (Italian pronunciation: [anˈtɔːnjo notʃeˈriːno]; born 9 April 1985) is an Italian football manager and former player who played as a midfielder. He was formerly the head coach of USL Championship club Las Vegas Lights FC.

During his playing career, Nocerino played predominantly in Italy for namely AC Milan, Juventus, Palermo, and in the United States for Orlando City. At international level, he represented the Italy national team, winning a runners-up medal at Euro 2012, and was also a member of the Italy national team that took part at the 2008 Olympics. He used to serve as an academy coach at Orlando City.

== Club career ==
=== Early career ===
Nocerino started playing at the age of five years at a small club in his neighbourhood, coached by his father. When he was 13, he joined the Juventus youth academy. He made his professional debut with Avellino in Serie B on 11 September 2003, drawing 0–0 with Parma.

In August 2004 Nocerino was sold to Genoa in a co-ownership deal for €450,000; in a separate deal Domenico Criscito and Francesco Volpe joined Turin also in co-ownership deals for a total fee of €1.9 million in June 2004.

His first match in Serie A came on 12 February 2006 for Messina, beating Sampdoria 4–2. His first goal in Serie A for Messina was scored on 7 May 2006 against Empoli; it was then stricken off when the game was forfeited. In summer 2006 half of the registration rights of Nocerino was sold to Piacenza from Genoa.

=== Piacenza and Juventus ===
In the 2006–07 Serie B season, at Piacenza, Nocerino started regularly, playing 37 games and scoring six goals. In June 2007, Juventus bought back 50% registration rights of Nocerino, from Piacenza for €3.7 million.

He made his official debut with Juventus playing in the starting XI on the opening day of Serie A against Livorno, which Juventus won 5–1. His performances saw coach Claudio Ranieri play him in the first half of the season. In the second half, with the arrival of Mohamed Sissoko, his opportunity to play diminished. He made 32 league appearances and four in the Coppa Italia.

=== Palermo ===
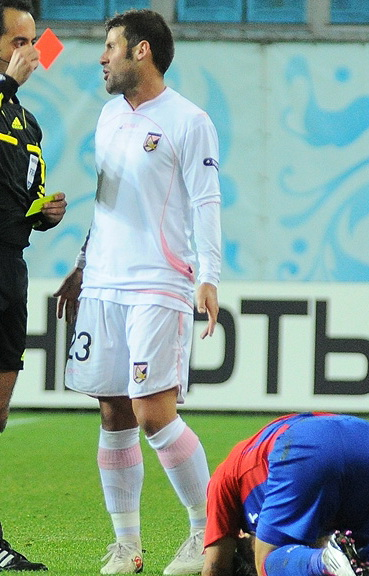
Nocerino receiving a red card in a Europa League match against CSKA Moscow

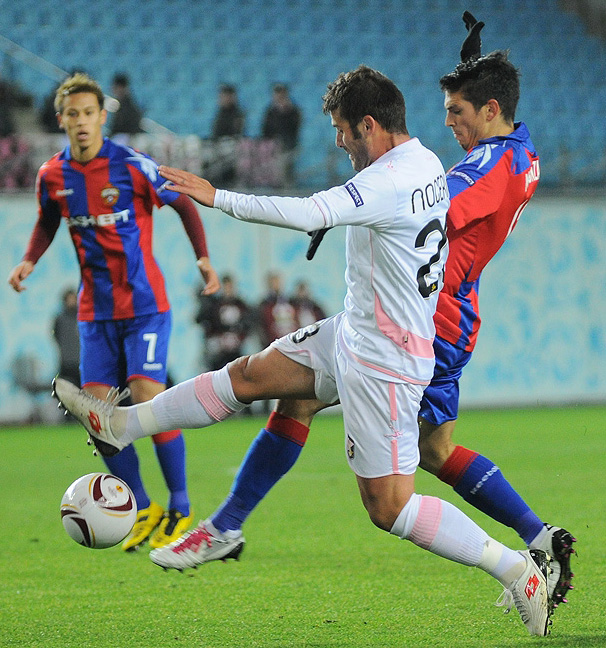
Nocerino playing in 2011

On 30 May 2008, Nocerino moved permanently to Palermo as part of the transfer that took Amauri to Juventus. Nocerino was priced at €7.5 million. He made his debut in the Rosanero shirt in a 3–1 victory against Roma on 13 September. In the 2009–10 season, with Walter Zenga as coach, he started again regularly in the first XI. On 23 September 2009, in the home game against Roma, he scored his first goal in Serie A for Palermo. His only other goal that season was scored against Lazio on 21 February 2010.

With the arrival of manager Delio Rossi, he was assigned the task of offensive midfielder, leaving the defensive midfield work to Giulio Migliaccio. He was also used as coverage of the left wing when full-back Federico Balzaretti pushed forward. He closed his second season with Palermo with 35 appearances and two goals in the league, plus three appearances in Coppa Italia. Playing the quarter-finals in the Coppa Italia, which Palermo won on penalties against Parma, marked his 100th appearance for Palermo. He finished this season with 49 appearances in all competitions, being the most used player in the team and scoring four goals, all in the league.

In the beginning of the 2011–12 season, after playing two matches in the Europa League's third qualifying round against Swiss side FC Thun, he left Palermo, making a total of 122 appearances and scoring six goals during his tenure.

=== AC Milan ===
On 31 August 2011, the last day of the Italian transfer window and only an hour before the window ended, Nocerino joined Milan on a five-year contract, for €500,000.

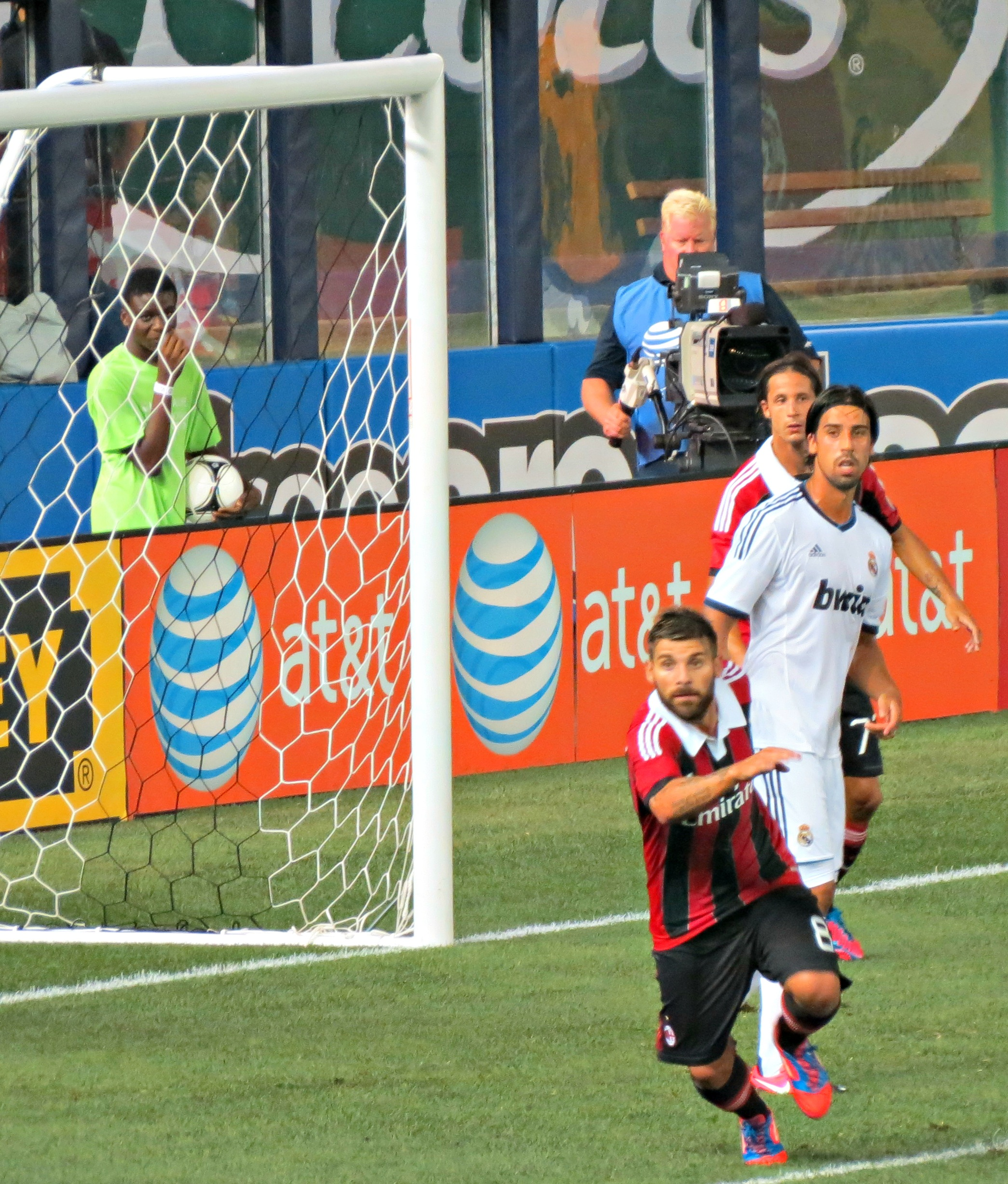
Nocerino in action for A.C. Milan against Real Madrid – Nocerino charging in front of Real Madrid's Sami Khedira with Luca Antonini in check

Nocerino made his Milan debut in the first 2011–12 game of the season on 9 September 2011 coming on as a 68th-minute substitute for fellow debutante Alberto Aquilani in a 2–2 home draw against Lazio. He made his UEFA Champions League debut in the next game on 13 September, when Milan drew 2–2 against FC Barcelona.

On 15 October, he scored his first goal in the 3–0 home victory against former club Palermo, completing a great team move led by Antonio Cassano and Robinho. Due to the injury crisis, he played regularly until picking up his fourth caution of the season on 6 November, resulting in a suspension. On 26 October, Nocerino notched a hat-trick for Milan in a 4–1 win against Parma. On 25 February 2012, Nocerino scored against title chaser Juventus in the 1–1 draw, putting his goal tally to eight for the season.

Nocerino scored in Milan's Second-Leg Champions League Quarter-final tie against Barcelona just after the half-hour mark to level the match at 1–1 after Lionel Messi opened the scoring with a penalty. The game ended 3–1 on the night and also on aggregate to Barcelona. After A.C. Milan's elimination from the Champions League and failure to defend their league title, manager Massimiliano Allegri rejected speculation that Nocerino would be sold. Forza Italian Football named Nocerino as the signing of the season, due to his goalscoring attributes. Nocerino finished the season with 10 goals in Serie A, finishing the 2011–12 campaign as the highest-scoring central midfielder, and breaking Romeo Benetti's 1973 club record of 7 goals from midfield in a single season, as Milan finished in second place in the League.

In the summer of 2012, Nocerino took the A.C. Milan squad number 8 following the departure of Gennaro Gattuso to join Swiss club Sion. He said it was 'an honour' to receive the number 8 shirt as a worthy successor to Gattuso. On 16 December 2012, Nocerino scored a goal 35 seconds into the game in which Milan defeated Pescara. After the game, Nocerino told the press that he would like to dedicate his goal to the victims of the Sandy Hook Elementary School shooting. Nocerino said, "... everything I did today was only for them." However, as the season progressed, Nocerino considered leaving the club in the summer if he was not guaranteed a regular starting place.

In the summer of 2013, Nocerino changed his squad number to 23 following the departure of the former captain Massimo Ambrosini. Following the sack of Manager Allegri, Nocerino made 11 appearances in 2013–14 season and reacted with shock when he left A.C. Milan on loan. At the time of his transfer, he was linked with a move to Torino.

==== West Ham United (loan) ====
On 25 January 2014, Nocerino signed for Premier League club West Ham United on loan for the remainder of the season. Nocerino made his first appearance for West Ham against Chelsea on 29 January coming on as a substitute for Kevin Nolan in the 80th minute in a 0–0 draw at Stamford Bridge. Having made ten appearances for the club, Nocernino's loan spell with West Ham United came to an end despite his wish to stay.

==== Torino (loan) ====
On 2 July 2014, Nocerino was loaned to Torino. He made his debut during the third round of the 2014–15 Europa League in a 3–0 win against Sweden's Brommapojkarna.

==== Parma (loan) ====
On 15 January 2015, Torino decided to terminate the loan and Nocerino moved to Parma until the end of the season. On 1 February 2015, he scored his first goal for Parma in a 1–3 away loss to Milan.

=== Orlando City ===
On 14 February 2016, Milan announced that Nocerino would move to MLS club Orlando City after mutually terminating his contract, a signing he completed on 18 February.

On 8 November 2017, Nocerino stated that he would not extend his contract with Orlando and left the club at the end of the 2017 season.

=== Benevento ===
On 6 July 2018, Nocerino signed with Serie B club Benevento. He was released from his Benevento contract by mutual consent on 19 December 2018.

=== Retirement ===
Nocerino announced his retirement from professional football on 23 January 2020, and was hired to coach in Orlando City's academy

== International career ==
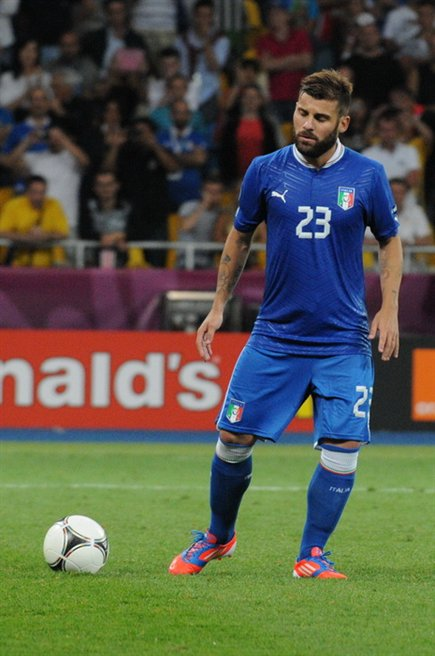
Nocerino in action for Italy in the quarter-final against England at UEFA Euro 2012

Nocerino played for Italy's under-20 in the 2005 FIFA World Youth Championship and with their under-21 in the 2007 UEFA European Under-21 Championship. He captained the Italy under-23 side in their triumph over Chile to win the Toulon Tournament for the first time in the team's history. He also competed in the 2008 Beijing Olympics as captain of Italy's Olympic squad. He received his first call up to Italy's national team by Roberto Donadoni on 17 October 2007 in a friendly against South Africa. Under Cesare Prandelli, Nocerino was selected to Italy's final 23-man squad at the 2012 European Championships. He played in the quarter-finals against England, where he had a goal disallowed for offside in extra-time, and subsequently scored in the penalty shootout which Italy won 4–2. Italy went on to reach the final of the tournament, were they beaten 4–0 by Spain, who claimed a record third consecutive major trophy, and their second consecutive European Championship title.

== Style of play ==
Compared to Gennaro Gattuso during his time at Milan, Nocerino was a quick, energetic, and hard-working player who was primarily deployed as a ball-winning defensive midfielder, or as a box-to-box midfielder, although he could be deployed anywhere in midfield. During his time at Juventus, he was played as a deep-lying playmaker on occasion, and even as a winger, although his preferred role was that of an attacking central midfielder, known as the "mezzala" role, in Italy. With the Italy national team, under Cesare Prandelli, he has also been used in a new role on occasion, as a false-attacking midfielder. Nocerino was primarily known for his pace, stamina, strength, and his tenacious tackling ability, as well his adeptness at reading the game and pressing opponents. He was also capable of being an offensive threat due to his tendency to make attacking runs into the box, as well as his eye for goal and powerful and accurate shot from distance. Throughout his career, he was able to improve his distribution, as well as his technical and creative skills, which made him capable of providing assists for teammates.

== Coaching career ==
Nocerino was appointed to his first head coaching position in November 2023, taking over Miami FC in the USL Championship. Nocerino departed Miami FC late in the season, on 16 October 2024. He compiled a league record of three wins, 27 losses, and two draws.

Nocerino was named head coach of Las Vegas Lights in the USL Championship in January 2025. He was fired in June after only 12 games into the regular season, as the team was 3–6–3 and one point away from playoff qualification at the time.

== Personal life ==
On 18 September 2007, it was reported that Nocerino was hit by a car after leaving a restaurant in Turin and was hospitalised for scans when he suffered minor concussion and bruising. The following day, Nocerino was discharged from the hospital and monitored for a few days. In response of asking question to Twitter, Nocerino has two children that he cited "change his life and that his father is his role model."

== Career statistics ==
=== Club ===
Appearances and goals by club, season and competition
Club	Season	League			National cup		Continental		Other		Total	
Club	Season	Division	Apps	Goals	Apps	Goals	Apps	Goals	Apps	Goals	Apps	Goals
Avellino (loan)	2003–04	Serie B	34	0	0	0	—		—		34	0
Genoa	2004–05	Serie B	5	0	0	0	—		—		5	0
Catanzaro (loan)	2004–05	Serie B	21	0	0	0	—		—		21	0
Crotone (loan)	2005–06	Serie B	15	0	0	0	—		—		15	0
Messina (loan)	2005–06	Serie A	10	0	0	0	—		—		10	0
Piacenza	2006–07	Serie B	37	6	2	0	—		—		39	6
Juventus	2007–08	Serie A	32	0	4	0	—		—		36	0
Palermo	2008–09	Serie A	33	0	0	0	—		—		33	0
Palermo	2009–10	Serie A	35	2	3	0	—		—		38	2
Palermo	2010–11	Serie A	38	4	5	0	6	0	—		49	4
Palermo	2011–12	Serie A	0	0	0	0	2	0	—		2	0
Palermo	Total		106	6	8	0	8	0	0	0	122	6
AC Milan	2011–12	Serie A	35	10	3	0	10	1	—		48	11
AC Milan	2012–13	Serie A	26	2	0	0	3	0	—		29	2
AC Milan	2013–14	Serie A	11	0	2	0	3	0	—		16	0
AC Milan	2015–16	Serie A	2	0	1	0	—		—		3	0
AC Milan	Total		74	12	6	0	16	1	0	0	96	13
West Ham (loan)	2013–14	Premier League	10	0	0	0	—		—		10	0
Torino (loan)	2014–15	Serie A	5	0	0	0	6	0	—		11	0
Parma (loan)	2014–15	Serie A	20	3	1	0	—		—		21	3
Orlando City	2016	MLS	21	0	2	0	—		—		23	0
Orlando City	2017	MLS	31	1	1	0	—		—		32	1
Orlando City	Total		52	1	3	0	0	0	0	0	55	1
Benevento	2018–19	Serie B	6	0	3	0	—		—		9	0
Career total			427	28	26	0	30	1	0	0	484	29

=== International ===
Appearances and goals by national team and year
National team	Year	Apps	Goals
Italy	2007	1	0
Italy	2011	8	0
Italy	2012	6	0
Total		15	0

=== Managerial ===
As of match played 6 October 2024

Managerial record by team and tenure
Team	From	To	Record								Ref.
Team	From	To	M	W	D	L	GF	GA	GD	Win %	Ref.
Miami FC	14 November 2023	16 October 2024	33	3	2	28	27	82	−55	9.09	
Total			33	3	2	28	27	82	−55	9.09	

== Honours ==
Italy U21

- Toulon Tournament: 2008

Italy

- UEFA European Championship runner-up: 2012

Individual

- Serie A Team of the Year: 2011–12
