= Rubinho (footballer) =

Brazilian footballer (born 1982)

Personal information
- Full name: Rubens Fernando Moedim
- Date of birth: 4 August 1982 (age 44)
- Place of birth: São Paulo, Brazil
- Height: 1.86 m (6 ft 1 in)
- Position: Goalkeeper

Youth career
- –2001: Corinthians

Senior career*
| Years | Team | Apps | (Gls) |
| 2001–2005 | Corinthians | 34 | (0) |
| 2005–2006 | Vitória Setúbal | 12 | (0) |
| 2006–2009 | Genoa | 95 | (0) |
| 2009–2011 | Palermo | 6 | (0) |
| 2010 | → Livorno (loan) | 11 | (0) |
| 2010–2011 | → Torino (loan) | 26 | (0) |
| 2012–2016 | Juventus | 2 | (0) |
| 2016–2017 | Como | 0 | (0) |
| 2017 | Genoa | 2 | (0) |
| 2018 | Avaí | 1 | (0) |
| Total | | 189 | (0) |

International career
| 2000–2003 | Brazil U20 | 19 | (0) |
- * Club domestic league appearances and goals

Rubens Fernando Moedim (born 4 August 1982), known as Rubinho, is a Brazilian former professional footballer who played as a goalkeeper.

After starting out at Corinthians in his country of birth, he went on to spend most of his professional career in Italy.

== Club career ==
Having started at SC Corinthians Paulista, São Paulo-born Rubinho played his first four professional seasons there. In January 2006 he signed with Portugal's Vitória de Setúbal, helping the Sadinos achieve a final comfortable eighth position in the Primeira Liga.

Subsequently, Rubinho moved to Italy's Serie B, joining Genoa where he was an undisputed starter from early on, achieving promotion to Serie A in his first season (29 games played). He appeared in the exact number of matches in the following campaign, as the team ranked tenth.

On 6 August 2009, Rubinho joined Palermo signing a five-year contract, with Marco Amelia, whom occupied the same position, moving in the opposite direction – both players were valued at €5 million. He was loaned out to Livorno on February of the following year, after losing his place to young Salvatore Sirigu.

On 29 June 2010, ChievoVerona initially agreed with Palermo to sign Rubinho on loan, subject to Stefano Sorrentino's sale. The deal eventually collapsed but, on 31 August, he signed for second-tier club Torino, also on loan.

Despite Sirigu refusing to sign a new contract with Palermo and being eventually cast aside, Benussi was used in the 2011–12 UEFA Europa League third qualifying round, which ended in elimination at the hands of FC Thun, and Rubinho even lost his second-choice status for that tie, with Giacomo Brichetto taking his place. On 16 December 2011, he terminated his contract with the club.

On 29 August 2012, after training with Grêmio Barueri in his country and going on trial with Varese, even signing with the latter, Rubinho joined Juventus on a one-year deal. During his spell, he played second-fiddle to Gianluigi Buffon and Marco Storari, although he became known as a key dressing room personality for the Turin side. He made his competitive debut on 18 May 2013, coming on for Storari in the 80th minute of a 2–3 away defeat to Sampdoria on the final match of the season as the club had already been crowned champions; subsequently, he renewed his contract.

Rubinho made his second appearance for the club on 18 May 2014, coming on for Buffon and keeping a clean sheet in a 3–0 home win over Cagliari as the Old Lady celebrated another league title under manager Antonio Conte with a record 102 points. In late June 2014, he agreed to another extension.

On 30 August 2015, whilst on the bench of an away fixture against [[AS Roma]Roma]], Rubinho received a straight red card in the 65th minute of the eventual 1–2 loss for unsportsmen-like conduct. After four seasons with the club, he left Juventus on 30 June 2016 following the expiration of his contract.

After remaining without a club for several months, on 14 December, Rubinho signed a contract with Lega Pro sude Como, which would keep him at the club until the end of the 2016–17 season. On 13 January 2017, however, the club's general director announced that his contract with the club had been cancelled, for personal reasons. The following day, he signed with his former club Genoa.

On 31 December, Rubinho signed a one–year contract with Avaí in his home country.

== International career ==
Rubinho represented Brazil in the 2001 FIFA World Youth Championship, being first-choice.

== Style of play ==
A reliable and experienced shot-stopper, who was well–regarded for his goalkeeping ability during his time in Italy, Rubinho was also known for his leadership and vocal presence in goal, being considered a key dressing room personality for his teams throughout his career. As a goalkeeper, he also stood out for his speed when rushing off his line to collect the ball or anticipate opponents who had beaten the off-side trap, and was known for his ability to get to ground quickly to parry shots. Moreover, he was effective in his distribution and competent with the ball at his feet. In 2009, former goalkeeper Luca Marchegiani considered Rubinho to be me among the best goalkeepers in Italy.

== Personal life ==
Rubinho's older brother, Zé Elias, was also a professional footballer. A midfielder, he played for nearly 15 clubs during 16 years, including Inter Milan.

== Career statistics ==
Appearances and goals by club, season and competition
| Club | Season | League | | | State league | | National cup | | Continental | | Other | | Total | |
| Club | Season | Division | Apps | Goals | Apps | Goals | Apps | Goals | Apps | Goals | Apps | Goals | Apps | Goals |
|---|---|---|---|---|---|---|---|---|---|---|---|---|---|---|
| Vitória Setúbal | 2005–06 | Primeira Liga | 12 | 0 | — | | 4 | 0 | — | | — | | 16 | 0 |
| Genoa | 2006–07 | Serie B | 29 | 0 | — | | 3 | 0 | — | | 0 | 0 | 32 | 0 |
| Genoa | 2007–08 | Serie A | 29 | 0 | — | | 2 | 0 | — | | — | | 29 | 0 |
| Genoa | 2008–09 | Serie A | 37 | 0 | — | | 1 | 0 | — | | — | | 38 | 0 |
| Genoa | Total | | 95 | 0 | — | | 6 | 0 | — | | 0 | 0 | 101 | 0 |
| Palermo | 2009–10 | Serie A | 6 | 0 | — | | 2 | 0 | — | | — | | 8 | 0 |
| Livorno (loan) | 2009–10 | Serie A | 11 | 0 | — | | — | | — | | — | | 11 | 0 |
| Torino (loan) | 2010–11 | Serie B | 26 | 0 | — | | 0 | 0 | — | | — | | 26 | 0 |
| Juventus | 2012–13 | Serie A | 1 | 0 | — | | 0 | 0 | 0 | 0 | — | | 1 | 0 |
| Juventus | 2013–14 | Serie A | 1 | 0 | — | | 0 | 0 | 0 | 0 | 0 | 0 | 1 | 0 |
| Juventus | 2014–15 | Serie A | 0 | 0 | — | | 0 | 0 | 0 | 0 | 0 | 0 | 0 | 0 |
| Juventus | 2015–16 | Serie A | 0 | 0 | — | | 0 | 0 | 0 | 0 | 0 | 0 | 0 | 0 |
| Juventus | Total | | 2 | 0 | — | | 0 | 0 | 0 | 0 | 0 | 0 | 2 | 0 |
| Como | 2016–17 | Lega Pro | 0 | 0 | — | | — | | — | | — | | 0 | 0 |
| Genoa | 2016–17 | Serie A | 2 | 0 | — | | 0 | 0 | — | | — | | 2 | 0 |
| Avaí | 2018 | Série B | 1 | 0 | 1 | 0 | 0 | 0 | — | | — | | 2 | 0 |
| Career total | | | 155 | 0 | 1 | 0 | 12 | 0 | 0 | 0 | 0 | 0 | 168 | 0 |

== Honours ==
Juventus

- Serie A: 2012–13, 2013–14, 2014–15, 2015–16
- Coppa Italia: 2014–15, 2015–16
- Supercoppa Italiana: 2013, 2015

Individual

- Toulon Tournament Best Goalkeeper: 2002
