= Fabio Cristofari =

Italian painter (died 1689)

- Fabio Cristofari, Jesus meets Veronica, after a design of Andrea Sacchi, Vatican Grottoes
- Born: before 1648; Italy
- Died: 1689
- Occupations: Baroque painter and mosaicist
- Known for: mosaicist in St. Peter's Basilica during the 1670s and 1680s
- Notable work: Chapel of the Pietà, Presentation Chapel, Chapel of the Crucifixion

Fabio Cristofari (died 1689) was an Italian Baroque painter and mosaicist active in Rome. He was a member of the Academy of Saint Luke by 1658, and became the leading mosaicist in St. Peter's Basilica during the 1670s and 1680s. His contributions to the Chapel of the Pietà, the Presentation Chapel, and the Chapel of the Crucifixion were after the designs of Ciro Ferri, Carlo Maratti, and Andrea Sacchi, respectively. His son, Pietro Paolo Cristofari was also responsible for many of the church's mosaic decorations.
