= Daniel Jara Martínez =

Paraguayan footballer (born 1993)

Personal information
- Full name: Daniel Celso Jara Martínez
- Date of birth: 22 November 1993 (age 32)
- Place of birth: Capiata, Paraguay
- Height: 1.83 m (6 ft 0 in)
- Position: Attacking midfielder

Youth career
- Nacional Asunción
- 2010–2012: Palermo
- 2012–2013: → Genoa (loan)

Senior career*
Years	Team	Apps	(Gls)
2013–2016	Genoa	0	(0)
2013–2014	→ Nocerina (loan)	12	(0)
2014–2015	→ San Marino (loan)	12	(2)
2016–	29 de Setiembre		
- * Club domestic league appearances and goals

Daniel Celso Jara Martínez (born 22 November 1993) is a Paraguayan football midfielder.

== Career ==
Jara Martínez started his career with Paraguayan outfit Club Nacional Asunción, with whom he participated in the 2010 Torneo di Viareggio, a youth international tournament during which he was noticed by Palermo director of football Walter Sabatini. He was subsequently offered a trial in February 2010, joining the first team for a number of weeks and taking part to their training sessions; in order to defy journalists from his real identity, Sabatini referred him to the journalists using the name of "Gonzalez".

On 31 August 2010 Palermo confirmed the signing of Jara Martínez from Nacional Asunción. The player immediately joined the under-19 youth team, but only made his competitive debut later on November due to bureaucratic issues. Since then, the player has trained occasionally with the first-team squad, and also appeared on the bench for a number of Serie A games.

On 25 January 2011, an injury crisis that left Palermo with only an available first-team striker (captain Fabrizio Miccoli) led head coach Delio Rossi to call him up for the 2010–11 Coppa Italia quarter-final game against Parma, a game that saw Jara Martínez making his first team debut as a 70th-minute replacement for Miccoli. The match ultimately ended to a penalty shootout, with Jara Martínez himself scoring the decisive goal that led Palermo into the semi-finals of the competition. This was followed by a lacklustre season where Jara Martínez was regularly benched in the Primavera team too, behind other promising youngsters such as Mauro Bollino, César Verdún and Cephas Malele.

On 20 August 2012, Palermo announced to have loaned Jara Martínez to Genoa in an exchange deal that involved the permanent signing of Steve von Bergen for €1.7 million and the permanent sale of Alexandros Tzorvas for €600,000. After spending a full season with the youth squad, he was permanently signed by Genoa and successively loaned to Lega Pro Prima Divisione club Nocerina.

On 10 July 2014 he was signed by San Marino.
