= Pietro Paolo Cristofari =

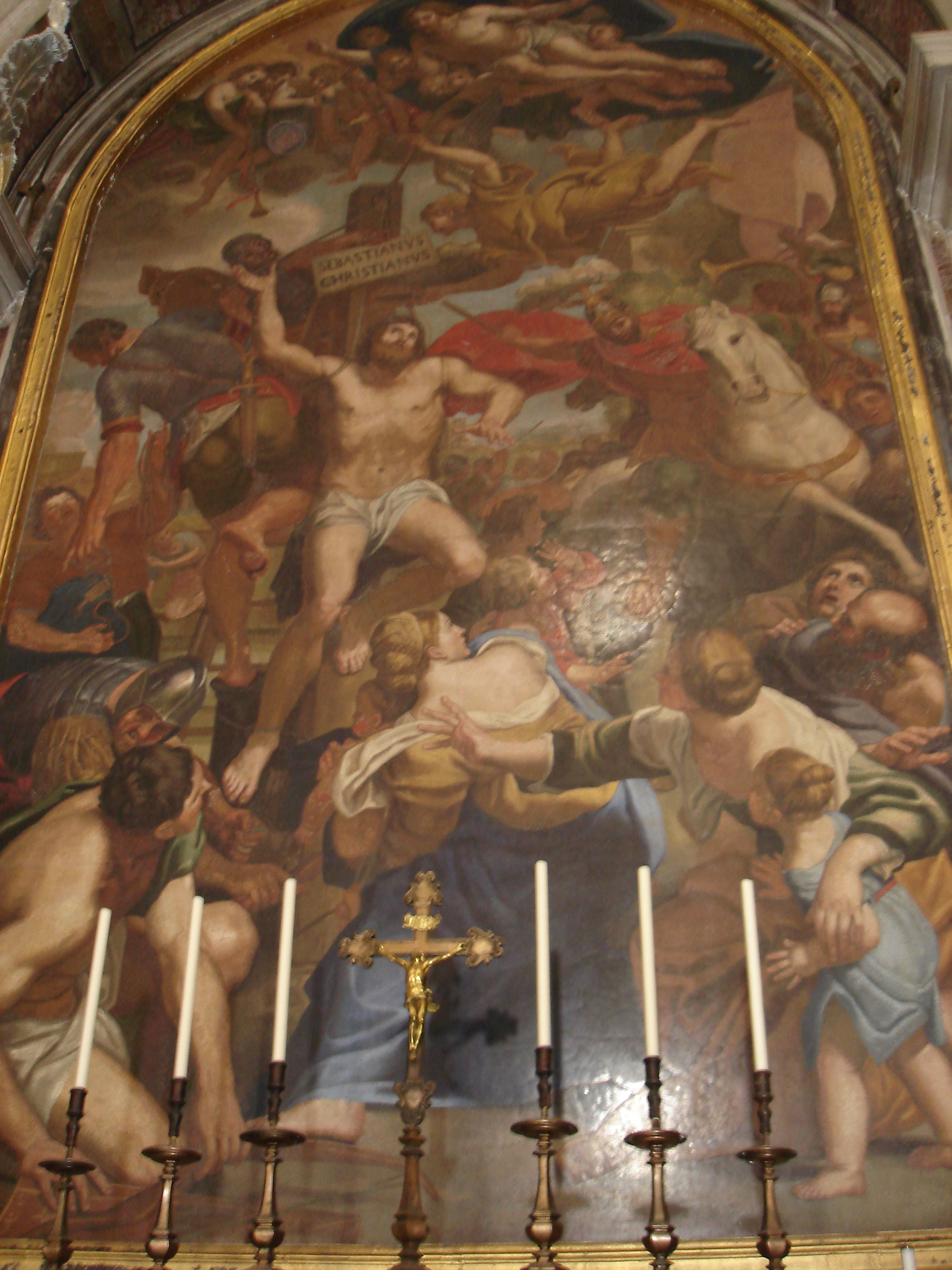
Martyrdom of Saint Sebastian, mosaic by Pietro Paolo Cristofari after the painting of Domenichino.

Pietro Paolo Cristofari (1685–1743) was a late-Baroque Italian mosaicist active in Rome, and the son of Fabio Cristofari. He became the first director of the Vatican mosaic studio, responsible for decorating the domes and altars in St. Peter's Basilica. Under his leadership he personally made mosaic altarpieces after the paintings of artists such as Giovanni Francesco Romanelli, Guercino, Domenichino, and Nicolas Poussin.
