= Marco Calderoni =

Italian footballer (born 1989)

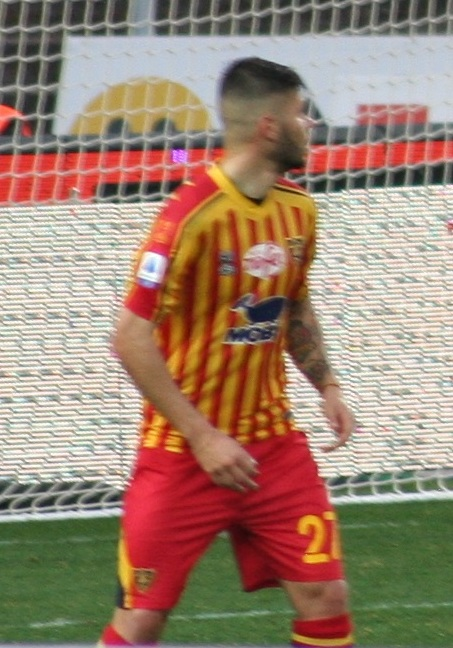

Personal information
- Full name: Marco Calderoni
- Date of birth: 18 February 1989 (age 37)
- Place of birth: Latisana, Italy
- Height: 1.80 m (5 ft 11 in)
- Position: Left back

Team information
- Current team: Nardò
- Number: 27

Youth career
- Liventina Gorghense
- 2003–2008: Piacenza

Senior career*
Years	Team	Apps	(Gls)
2008–2012	Piacenza	68	(1)
2009–2010	→ Palermo (loan)	1	(0)
2010–2011	→ Ascoli (loan)	18	(0)
2012–2013	Grosseto	43	(0)
2013–2015	Bari	69	(3)
2015–2017	Chievo	0	(0)
2015–2016	→ Latina (loan)	38	(1)
2016–2017	→ Novara (loan)	33	(3)
2017–2018	Novara	36	(1)
2018–2021	Lecce	71	(4)
2021–2022	Vicenza	16	(0)
2022–2023	Cesena	37	(2)
2023–2024	Fermana	15	(0)
2024	Brindisi	12	(0)
2024–	Nardò	11	(0)

International career
2006–2007	Italy U18	3	(0)
2009–2012	Italy U20	13	(0)
- * Club domestic league appearances and goals as of 17 November 2024

Marco Calderoni (born 18 February 1989) is an Italian footballer who plays as a left-back for Serie D club Nardò.

== Club career ==
=== Piacenza ===
Calderoni made his first team debut on 25 May 2008 against Cesena, the 2nd last match of the season.

In February 2010, Piacenza and Serie A outfit Palermo agreed on a loan exchange between Calderoni and Romanian full-back Cristian Melinte, with the former joining the rosanero with immediate effect.

He played his first game in a rosanero jersey, as well as his first Serie A game, as a starter in a 3–1 home win to Bologna. He returned at Piacenza at the end of the season, with only one appearance during his short stint with the Sicilian side. In January 2011, he transferred on loan to Ascoli.

=== Grosseto ===
In January 2012 Calderoni was signed by Grosseto.

=== Bari ===
On 14 August 2013, Calderoni was signed by Chievo. Half of the registration rights, valued for €90,000, was immediately swap to Bari, for the full registration rights of Claiton dos Santos, valued for undisclosed fee. Calderoni signed a 5-year contract with Bari. In March 2014, the liquidator of Bari also adjusted the valued of the 50% registration rights, to €126,700. However, in June 2015, Cheivo bought back Calderoni for a price below the valuation, for €80,000.

=== Chievo ===
Calderoni re-joined Chievo on 25 June 2015 for €80,000. On 13 July he was signed by U.S. Latina Calcio in a temporary deal.

=== Novara ===
On 4 July 2016, he moved on loan to Novara Calcio along with Tomasz Kupisz. On 1 July 2017, Calderoni joined Novara on a permanent basis and signed a three-year deal with his club.

=== Lecce ===
In July 2018, he moved to Lecce and gained promotion to Serie A in the 2018–19 Serie B season. He scored his first Serie A goal on 25 September 2019 against SPAL.

=== Vicenza ===
On 16 July 2021, he joined Vicenza on a one-year contract with an option to extend.

=== Cesena ===
On 25 January 2022, he signed a contract with Cesena until the end of the 2023–24 season.

=== Fermana ===
On 30 August 2023, Calderoni joined Fermana on a one-year deal.

== International career ==
He was selected to 2009 Mediterranean Games and 2009 FIFA U-20 World Cup along with team-mate Francesco Bini.
