= Andrea Adamo (footballer) =

Italian footballer (born 1991)

Personal information
- Date of birth: 23 April 1991 (age 35)
- Place of birth: Alcamo, Italy
- Height: 1.74 m (5 ft 9 in)
- Position: Centre back

Team information
- Current team: Sansepolcro

Youth career
- Palermo

Senior career*
Years	Team	Apps	(Gls)
2010–2012	Palermo	0	(0)
2010–2011	→ Reggiana (loan)	6	(0)
2011–2012	→ Portogruaro (loan)	2	(0)
2012–2014	Foligno	64	(3)
2014–2015	Gavorrano	18	(0)
2015–2016	Leonfortese	28	(2)
2016	Foligno	12	(0)
2016–2017	Villabiagio	0	(0)
2016–2017	→ Verbania (loan)	17	(3)
2017–	Sansepolcro	5	(0)

International career
2009	Italy U18	4	(1)
2009–2010	Italy U19	13	(0)
2010	Italy U20	1	(0)
- * Club domestic league appearances and goals

Andrea Adamo (born 23 April 1991) is an Italian footballer who plays for Italian Serie D club Sansepolcro.

== Biography ==
Adamo started his career at Palermo. In August 2010 Adamo left for Reggiana. He was signed by Portogruaro in July 2011, in exchange for which the club received a subsidy of €20,000 from Palermo. On 29 June 2012 Adamo along with Francesco Vassallo were sold to Foligno in co-ownership deal, for a peppercorn of €500 each, but on 31 August 2012 Palermo bought back Vassallo by selling Adamo outright.

=== International career ===
Adamo received his first call-up in February 2009 from Italy national under-19 football team. The team in fact the same team with Italy national under-18 football team that season, as born 1990 team was eliminated from 2009 UEFA European Under-19 Football Championship qualification in October 2008. He did not play that match, but played the next match against Ukraine U19 (born 1990 squad) In April 2009 the same team had another fixture in Slovakia, but a U18 event. Adamo played all 3 matches of 2010 UEFA European Under-19 Football Championship qualification in November 2009, however he only played once in elite round in May 2010.

In the final tournament, Adamo started all 3 matches.
