= Samuele Romeo =

Italian footballer (born 1989)

Personal information
- Date of birth: March 6, 1989 (age 37)
- Place of birth: Palermo, Italy
- Height: 1.84 m (6 ft 0 in)
- Position: Centre back

Team information
- Current team: Nuorese

Youth career
- Palermo

Senior career*
Years	Team	Apps	(Gls)
2008–2011	Palermo	0	(0)
2009–2010	→ Lumezzane (loan)	9	(1)
2010–2011	→ Alessandria (loan)	29	(0)
2011–2012	Sorrento	14	(0)
2012–2014	Empoli	17	(0)
2014–2016	Juve Stabia	52	(2)
2016–2017	Mantova	11	(1)
2017	AS Melfi	16	(0)
2017	Latina	12	(0)
2018	Pomigliano	14	(0)
2018	Lupa Roma	12	(0)
2019	Torres	13	(0)
2019	Marsala	3	(0)
2020–	Nuorese	0	(0)

International career
2007	Italy U-18	1	(0)
- * Club domestic league appearances and goals as of 14:42, 9 January 2020 (UTC)

Samuele Romeo (born 6 March 1989) is an Italian professional football player who plays for Nuorese.

== Career ==
A youth product of Palermo, Romeo was signed by Lumezzane in a temporary deal on 10 July 2009.

In January 2014 Romeo was sold to Juve Stabia, with Luca Martinelli moved to Empoli. Both players were priced for €1.5 million.

On 25 August 2016 he was signed by Mantova in a 1-year deal.

He played for Serie D club Lupa Roma from September to December 2018.

On 4 February 2019, Romeo joined S.E.F. Torres 1903. In August 2019, he then joined S.S.D. Marsala Calcio. However, Romeo announced on 8 November 2019, that his contract had been terminated by mutual agreement. On 11 January 2020, he moved to Eccellenza club Nuorese.
