= Giuseppe Ingrassia =

Italian footballer

Personal information
- Date of birth: 9 September 1988 (age 38)
- Place of birth: Palermo, Italy
- Height: 1.85 m (6 ft 1 in)
- Position: Goalkeeper

Team information
- Current team: A.S.D. Licata 1931
- Number: 88

Youth career
- Palermo

Senior career*
| Years | Team | Apps | (Gls) |
| 2009–2011 | Palermo | 0 | (0) |
| 2009–2010 | → Verona (loan) | 5 | (0) |
| 2010–2011 | → Pergocrema (loan) | 0 | (0) |
| 2011–2013 | C.S. Visé | 44 | (0) |
| 2019– | A.S.D. Licata 1931 | 0 | (0) |
- * Club domestic league appearances and goals as of 17 August 2011 (UTC)

Giuseppe Ingrassia (born 9 September 1988 in Palermo) is an Italian professional football player currently playing for A.S.D. Licata 1931.
