= Giovanni Cristofari =

Italian footballer

Personal information
- Date of birth: 24 June 1993 (age 33)
- Place of birth: Rome, Italy
- Position: Midfielder

Youth career
- Roma
- 2010–2012: Palermo

Senior career*
Years	Team	Apps	(Gls)
2012–2013	Prato	13	(0)
2013–2014	Nocerina	7	(0)
2014	Benevento	0	(0)
2014–2015	Como	5	(0)
2015–2016	Martina	19	(0)
2017	Ancona	0	(0)

International career
2008–2009	Italy U16	10	(0)
2009	Italy U17	3	(0)
- * Club domestic league appearances and goals as of 10 April 2017 (UTC)

Giovanni Cristofari (born 24 June 1993) is an Italian footballer who currently is on a free agent.

== Biography ==
Cristofari was a youth product of A.S. Roma. However, he left the club before entering their reserve team. In January 2010 Cristofari was signed by Palermo. In 2012, he was signed by Prato on a free transfer. in 2013 the club was signed by Nocerina. However, after the club was expelled from the league, he was transferred to Benevento.

In July 2014 he was signed by Como on a free transfer. In July 2015 Cristofari was signed by Martina Franca.

Cristofari became a free agent circa 2016. On 11 March 2017 Cristofari was signed by Ancona.
