= Giacomo Brichetto =

Italian footballer

Personal information
- Date of birth: 9 May 1983 (age 43)
- Place of birth: Genoa, Italy
- Height: 1.94 m (6 ft 4 in)
- Position: Goalkeeper

Team information
- Current team: Ruggell

Senior career*
Years	Team	Apps	(Gls)
2001–2003	Alessandria	8	(0)
2003–2005	Martina	1	(0)
2005–2007	Sanremese	52	(0)
2007–2009	Novara	86	(0)
2009–2013	Palermo	1	(0)
2013–2017	did not play		
2017–	Ruggell		
- * Club domestic league appearances and goals as of 23:41, 15 December 2011 (UTC)

Giacomo Brichetto (born 9 May 1983) is an Italian former professional footballer who played as a goalkeeper for Ruggell.

== Career ==
Brichetto was born in Genoa, and spent most of his career in the lower ranks of Italian professional football. He joined then-Serie C2 club Novara in 2007, and played as first choice keeper until January 2010, when he was signed by Serie A club Palermo in a loan exchange deal with Samir Ujkani. He was fully acquired by Palermo later in June, filling the role of third choice goalkeeper at the Sicilian side. Brichetto made his first appearance with a Palermo jersey on 13 December 2011, replacing injured Alexandros Tzorvas during the first half of a Coppa Italia game against Siena, then lost 4–7 on penalties (4–4 after extra time).
