= Giulio Migliaccio =

Italian footballer

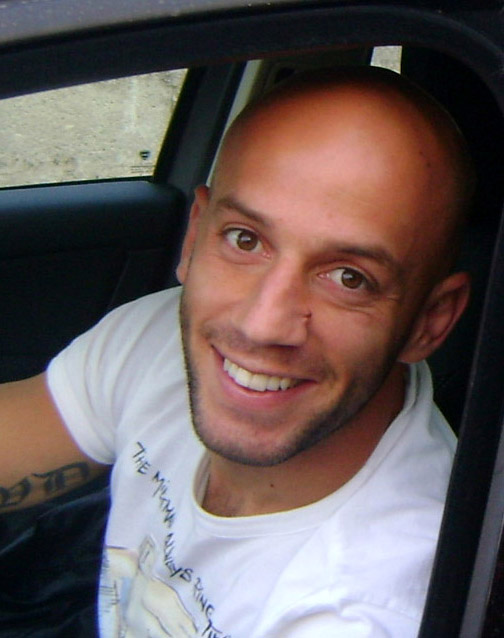

Personal information
- Date of birth: 23 June 1981 (age 45)
- Place of birth: Mugnano di Napoli, Italy
- Height: 1.78 m (5 ft 10 in)
- Positions: Defensive midfielder; central defender

Team information
- Current team: Salernitana (technical director)

Senior career*
Years	Team	Apps	(Gls)
1998–2000	Savoia	10	(0)
1999–2000	→ Puteolana (loan)	29	(6)
2000–2001	Bari	0	(0)
2001–2003	Giugliano	62	(1)
2003–2005	Ternana	36	(0)
2005–2007	Atalanta	78	(4)
2007–2013	Palermo	158	(8)
2012–2013	→ Fiorentina (loan)	24	(1)
2013–2017	Atalanta	60	(2)

International career
2000–2002	Italy U-20	4	(0)
- * Club domestic league appearances and goals

Giulio Migliaccio (Italian pronunciation: [ˈdʒuːljo miʎˈʎattʃo]; born 23 June 1981) is an Italian former professional footballer who played as a midfielder. He started at lower league sides Savoia, Puteolana, Bari, Giugliano, and Ternana before later featuring for Atalanta, Palermo, and Fiorentina in the Serie A.

== Club career ==
Migliaccio started his career at Savoia. He debuted as a professional during the 1998–99 season, playing in the Serie C championship, and making a total of 8 appearances. The following year he went on loan to Serie D club Puteolana. After an excellent season, his performances drew the attention of league leaders Bari, who bought Migliaccio ahead of the 2000–01 Serie A season. However, he never appeared for the club. The following year he was transferred to Giugliano in Serie C2.

In 2003, he moved to Ternana to play in Serie B. After 39 appearances, in January 2005 he moved to Atalanta during the 2004–05 Serie A season. He played three seasons with Atalanta, collecting 86 caps and 4 goals. His high quality performances during the 2006–07 season contributed to the club's excellent placement in the league.

=== Palermo ===
Migliaccio joined Palermo in the summer of 2007, and was strongly wanted by his former coach Stefano Colantuono. He was purchased for €5 million, plus the ownership of Adriano Pereira da Silva. In Palermo, Giulio became a pivotal player for the club in midfield, and a popular fan favourite, due to his commitment to the club and fighting spirit on the pitch. He was also occasionally lined up as a centre-back, first by Davide Ballardini and then, much more regularly, by Walter Zenga, Serse Cosmi and Devis Mangia. He was appointed Palermo vice-captain in 2011.

On 28 August 2010, he made his 100th appearance in the rosanero shirt: 93 appearances in the league, 4 in European competitions, and three in the Coppa Italia.

=== Fiorentina ===
On 31 August 2012, Migliaccio moved on loan to Fiorentina on the last day of the summer transfer window.

=== Atalanta ===
On 11 July 2013, Migliaccio completed a move to Atalanta from Palermo. On 29 May 2017, he announced that he would retire at the end of the season.

== International career ==
Between 2000 and 2002, Migliaccio was called up to the Italy under-20 national team on 11 occasions, collecting 4 appearances.

== Post-playing career ==
In June 2024, Migliaccio returned to Palermo as the club's new "international scout" working alongside the new sporting director Morgan De Sanctis. On 3 January 2025, both Migliaccio and De Sanctis were removed from their management roles due to Palermo underperforming significantly in the first half of the season.

== Career statistics ==
=== Club ===
As of 1 June 2017

Appearances and goals by club, season and competition
Club	Season	League			Cup		Continental		Total	
Club	Season	Division	Apps	Goals	Apps	Goals	Apps	Goals	Apps	Goals
Savoia	1998–99	Serie C1	8	0	0	0	0	0	8	0
Savoia	1999–2000	Serie B	1	0	0	0	0	0	1	0
Savoia	2000–01	Serie C1	1	0	0	0	0	0	1	0
Savoia	Total		10	0	0	0	0	0	10	0
Puteolana (loan)	1999–2000	Serie D	29	6	0	0	0	0	29	6
Bari	2000–01	Serie A	0	0	0	0	0	0	0	0
Giugliano	2001–02	Serie C2	31	0	0	0	0	0	31	0
Giugliano	2002–03	Serie C2	31	1	0	0	0	0	31	1
Giugliano	Total		62	1	0	0	0	0	62	1
Ternana	2003–04	Serie B	20	0	0	0	0	0	20	0
Ternana	2004–05	Serie B	16	0	3	0	0	0	19	0
Ternana	Total		46	0	3	0	0	0	49	0
Atalanta	2004–05	Serie A	14	0	1	0	0	0	15	0
Atalanta	2005–06	Serie B	31	2	4	0	0	0	35	2
Atalanta	2006–07	Serie A	33	2	3	0	0	0	36	2
Atalanta	Total		78	4	8	0	0	0	86	4
Palermo	2007–08	Serie A	31	0	1	0	2	0	34	0
Palermo	2008–09	Serie A	31	3	0	0	0	0	31	3
Palermo	2009–10	Serie A	30	1	2	0	0	0	32	1
Palermo	2010–11	Serie A	35	2	5	1	6	1	46	4
Palermo	2011–12	Serie A	30	2	1	0	2	0	33	2
Palermo	2012–13	Serie A	1	0	0	0	0	0	1	0
Palermo	Total		158	8	9	1	10	1	177	10
Fiorentina (loan)	2012–13	Serie A	24	1	3	0	0	0	27	1
Atalanta	2013–14	Serie A	19	1	2	0	0	0	21	1
Atalanta	2014–15	Serie A	20	1	2	0	0	0	22	1
Atalanta	2015–16	Serie A	18	0	1	0	0	0	19	0
Atalanta	2016–17	Serie A	3	0	1	0	0	0	4	0
Atalanta	Total		60	2	6	0	0	0	66	2
Career total			457	22	29	1	10	1	496	24
