= Federico Balzaretti =

Italian footballer (born 1981)

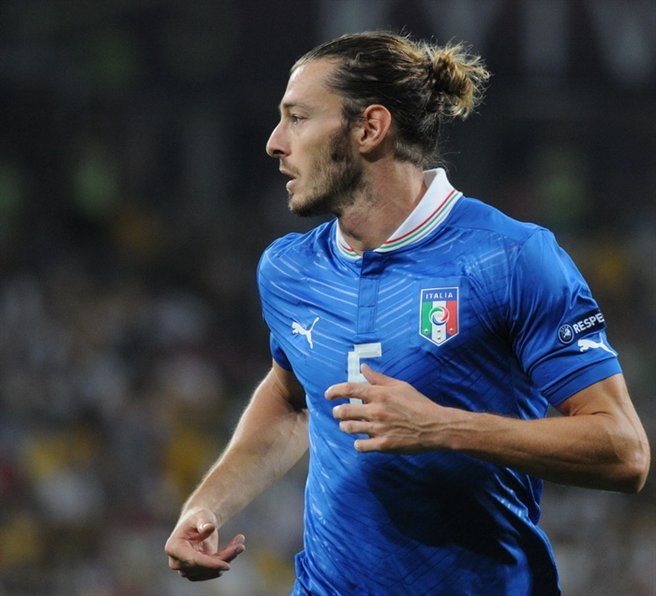
- Balzaretti with Italy at the UEFA Euro 2012

Personal information
- Date of birth: 6 December 1981 (age 44)
- Place of birth: Turin, Italy
- Height: 1.78 m (5 ft 10 in)
- Position: Left-back

Youth career
- 1994–1999: Torino

Senior career*
Years	Team	Apps	(Gls)
1999–2005	Torino	94	(2)
1999–2001	→ Varese (loan)	44	(0)
2001–2002	→ Siena (loan)	16	(0)
2005–2007	Juventus	57	(2)
2007–2008	Fiorentina	6	(0)
2008–2012	Palermo	143	(3)
2012–2015	Roma	39	(1)
Total		399	(8)

International career
2000	Italy U20	23	(1)
2002	Italy U21	4	(0)
2010–2013	Italy	16	(0)
Medal record
Men's Football
Representing Italy
UEFA European Championship
Runner-up	2012 Poland–Ukraine
- * Club domestic league appearances and goals

Federico Balzaretti (Italian pronunciation: [fedeˈriːko baldzaˈretti, - baltsa-]; born 6 December 1981) is an Italian former professional footballer who played as a left-back. Currently is the Loan Manager of Roma.

A product of the Torino youth system, his first experience as a professional footballer was on loan to Varese and Siena, returning to Turin to play a year in Serie A and two in Serie B. Later he moved to Juventus, playing a year in Serie A and the Champions League and winning the Scudetto, later revoked for the events of Calciopoli and the next season in the lower division that ended in promotion. Sold to Fiorentina in 2007, after half a season he moved to Palermo, with whom he played in the Europa League. In 2010, he was called up to the Italy national team and took part in the UEFA Euro 2012, where Italy finished as runners-up . The same summer, he moved to Roma. After struggling with injuries, on 12 August 2015, he announced his retirement from football after having made a total of 221 appearances and scored 4 goals in Serie A and 130 appearances and 3 goals in Serie B.

== Club career ==
=== Torino ===
Balzaretti began his playing career at the age of 6 for hometown club Torino, playing in the various youth teams. He soon gained a reputation as an athletic wing-back with enormous potential, and was soon loaned out to provincial sides Varese and Siena between 1999 and 2002. A local, Balzaretti identified with the supporters and shortly became a symbol for Torino supporters, kissing the badge under the curva at the end of games.

In 2004–05, he was heavily involved in the campaign for promotion, which brought the team back to Serie A. However, the promotion, achieved on the field, was lost during the difficult pre-season retreat after the bankruptcy of Torino Calcio. Balzaretti, as all the other players, were released and allowed to come to agreements with other teams.

=== Juventus ===
On 15 August 2005, Balzaretti was signed by cross-city rivals Juventus on a free transfer. "It was a hard decision," Balzaretti said. "But I only moved to Juve because I was promised I would stay and not be sold. I can't lie that the thought of staying in Turin, my home, was a big factor." His first wife, Jessica, was then pregnant with daughter Lucretia, influencing his stay in Piedmont. The move was interpreted as an act of betrayal by the Torino faithful (Balzaretti, having previously sworn eternal love for his former club) which have, ever since, booed and insulted him whenever he returns to Turin.

In 2005–06 he was part of the first team for the bianconeri, often playing as regular under orders of coach Fabio Capello, and finally winning the Serie A league. His first ever senior goal came on 17 February 2007, in Serie B, as Juventus beat Crotone 5–0.

=== Fiorentina and Palermo ===
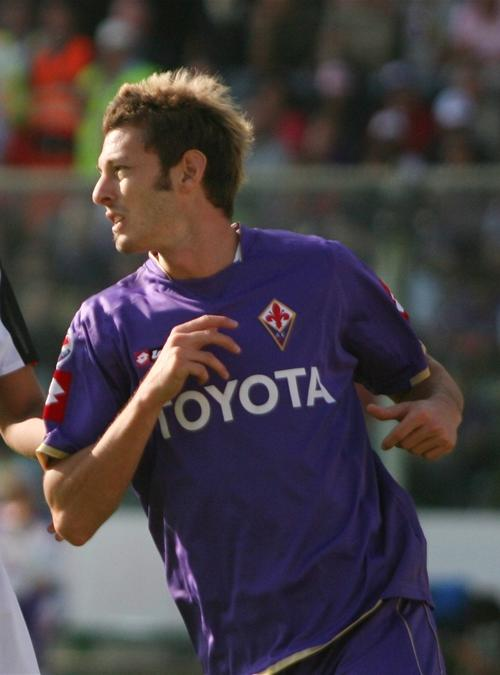
Balzaretti at Fiorentina

Balzaretti was sold to Fiorentina in July 2007 for €3.8 million fee, but failed to adjust with the Viola as he made only six appearances in the first half of the Serie A 2007-08, and was subsequently signed by Palermo on a 3 1/2-year contract in a permanent move (loan with an option to buy according to financial report) during the January transfer market, also for €3.8 million (€1.27 million for loan plus €2.53 million).

At Palermo, Balzaretti took the #42 jersey as a homage to his father, who was born in 1942; in his tenure with the Sicilian side, he immediately established himself as a mainstay, playing regularly for the rosanero also in the following seasons and establishing as one of the most praised Italian left backs.

In January 2010, Balzaretti signed a new 3 1/2-year contract.

=== Roma ===
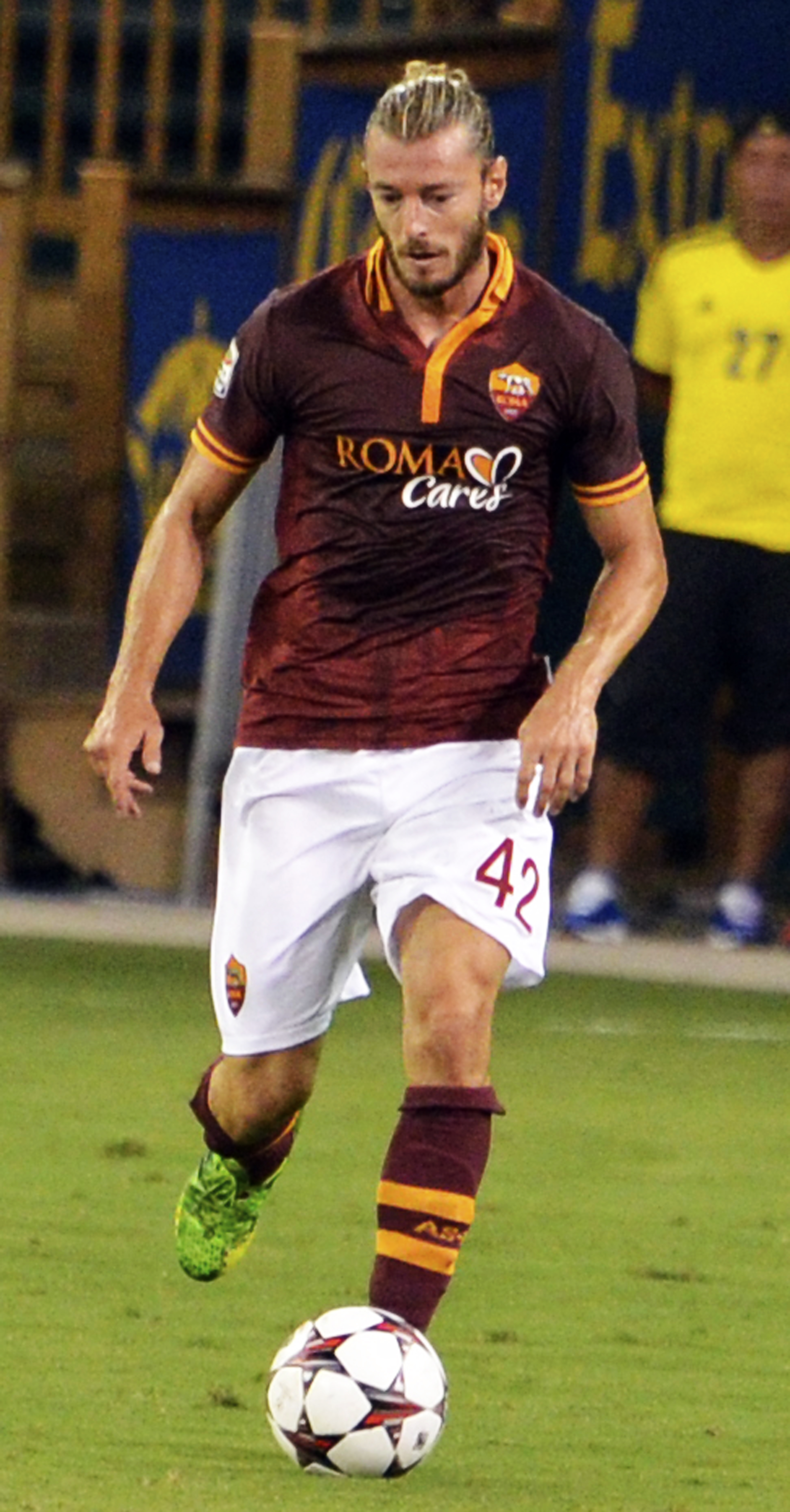
Balzaretti warming up prior to a friendly game against Chelsea

On 1 August 2012, Balzaretti signed a three-year contract with Roma, for a fee of €4.5 million. He made his debut in a 2–2 draw against Catania, during the 2012–13 season. He scored his first goal for Roma in the Derby della capitale match against Lazio, on 22 September 2013; Roma won the game 2–0. During his second season at the club, however, Balzaretti suffered a severe case of athletic pubalgia following Roma's match against Sassuolo, on 10 November 2013, which threatened to end his career; due to the pain in his pelvis, he had to undergo several operations. He finally returned to the pitch on the final match of the 2014–15 season, in a 2–1 home defeat to his former club Palermo, on 31 May 2015.

=== Retirement ===
On 12 August 2015, Balzaretti declared his retirement from professional football. He stated that failing to fully recover from the hip injury that he had battled with for the past two years was the reason for him to quit for good at the age of 33. The following is taken from Balzaretti's public statement:

"I am retiring from Football. Unfortunately the injury I've had is forcing me to hang up my boots. It has been a difficult decision to make, but I can't continue playing the way I want to, at 100 percent. Last year, in my last news conference here, I said I wanted to get back on the field and play one more match for Roma. I managed to play 90 more minutes with Roma and I'd like to thank everyone here for making that last dream come true. I'm happy to have spent the last few months of the season with this group and I am delighted we secured second place."

== International career ==
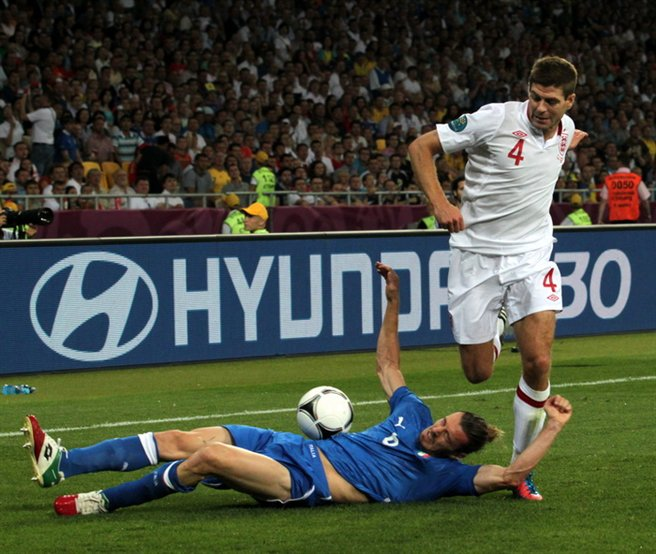
Balzaretti slide tackles Steven Gerrard at Euro 2012.

After playing with a number of youth selections between 2000 and 2002, Balzaretti made his debut with the Italy national team under coach Cesare Prandelli on 17 November 2010, in a friendly match against Romania. He has been selected in the Italian team for UEFA Euro 2012, becoming the starting left-back in the third match at the group stage as Italy moved from 3–5–2 to 4–4–2. He also played the entire match against Germany as a right-back due to absences of Christian Maggio who was suspended and Ignazio Abate who was injured but stayed on the bench, conceding a penalty during stoppage time, but also helping his team to reach the tournament final.

== Style of play ==
An offensive-minded, left-sided full-back, who was also capable of playing as a winger, wing-back, or as a wide-midfielder, Balzaretti's main attributes were his pace, stamina, and crossing ability. A tactically versatile player, he was also capable of playing on the right side of the pitch.

== Post-playing career ==
Following his retirement, Balzaretti agreed to stay at Roma, working under Roma sporting director Walter Sabatini. He stated, “I will now form part of the sports management staff here at Roma. It's something I like and feel is right for me."

On 2 November 2021 he was announced as the new director of football of struggling Serie B club Vicenza.

== Personal life ==
Balzaretti is married to renowned Italian ballerina Eleonora Abbagnato; their wedding took place in summer of 2011 in Palermo. They have two children. Balzaretti has two children from a previous relationship.

== Career statistics ==
=== Club ===
Appearances and goals by club, season and competition
Club	Season	League			Cup		Continental		Total	
Club	Season	Division	Apps	Goals	Apps	Goals	Apps	Goals	Apps	Goals
Varese (loan)	1999–2000	Serie C1	17	0	0	0	0	0	17	0
Varese (loan)	2000–01		27	0	2	0	0	0	29	0
Varese (loan)	Total		44	0	2	0	0	0	46	0
Siena (loan)	2001–02	Serie B	16	0	4	0	0	0	20	0
Torino	2002–03	Serie A	13	0	1	0	0	0	14	0
Torino	2003–04	Serie B	39	0	0	0	0	0	39	0
Torino	2004–05	Serie B	38+4	1+1	7	0	0	0	49	2
Torino	Total		94	2	8	0	0	0	102	2
Juventus	2005–06	Serie A	20	0	4	0	4	0	28	0
Juventus	2006–07	Serie B	37	2	3	0	0	0	40	2
Juventus	Total		57	2	7	0	4	0	68	2
Fiorentina	2007–08	Serie A	6	0	2	0	3	0	11	0
Palermo	2007–08	Serie A	16	0	0	0	0	0	16	0
Palermo	2008–09	Serie A	33	0	1	0	0	0	34	0
Palermo	2009–10	Serie A	34	1	2	0	0	0	36	1
Palermo	2010–11	Serie A	33	2	4	0	7	0	44	2
Palermo	2011–12	Serie A	27	0	0	0	2	0	29	0
Palermo	Total		143	3	7	0	9	0	159	3
Roma	2012–13	Serie A	27	0	5	0	0	0	32	1
Roma	2013–14	Serie A	11	1	0	0	0	0	11	1
Roma	2014–15	Serie A	1	0	0	0	0	0	1	0
Roma	Roma		39	1	5	0	0	0	44	2
Career total			399	9	35	0	16	0	450	9

=== International ===
Appearances and goals by national team and year
National team	Year	Apps	Goals
Italy	2010	1	0
Italy	2011	6	0
Italy	2012	8	0
Italy	2013	1	0
Total		16	0

== Honours ==
Juventus

- Serie B: 2006–07

Roma

- Coppa Italia runner-up: 2012–13

Italy

- UEFA European Championship runner-up: 2012

Individual

- Serie A Team of the Year: 2011–12
