= Amauri =

Brazilian-born Italian footballer (born 1980)

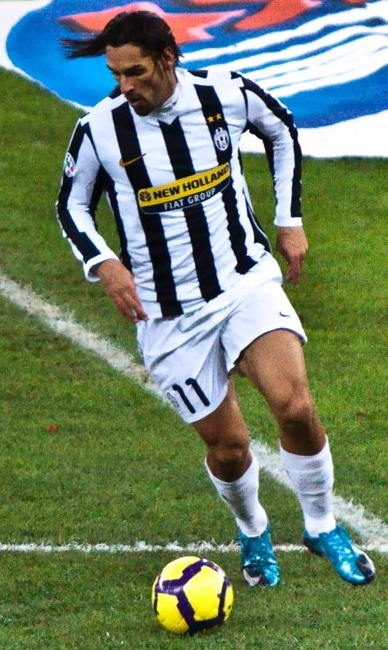
- Amauri with Juventus in 2009

Personal information
- Full name: Amauri Carvalho de Oliveira
- Date of birth: 3 June 1980 (age 46)
- Place of birth: Carapicuíba, Brazil
- Height: 1.86 m (6 ft 1 in)
- Position: Striker

Senior career*
Years	Team	Apps	(Gls)
1999–2000	Santa Catarina		
2000	Bellinzona	5	(1)
2000–2003	Parma	0	(0)
2001	→ Napoli (loan)	6	(1)
2001–2002	→ Piacenza (loan)	7	(1)
2002	→ Empoli (loan)	0	(0)
2002–2003	→ Messina (loan)	23	(4)
2003–2006	Chievo	90	(17)
2006–2008	Palermo	52	(23)
2008–2011	Juventus	71	(17)
2011	→ Parma (loan)	11	(7)
2012	Fiorentina	13	(1)
2012–2014	Parma	57	(16)
2014–2016	Torino	21	(1)
2016	Fort Lauderdale Strikers	13	(5)
2017	New York Cosmos	3	(0)

International career
2010	Italy	1	(0)
- * Club domestic league appearances and goals as of 9 August 2017

Amauri Carvalho de Oliveira (born 3 June 1980), known as Amauri, is a former professional footballer who played as a striker. Born in Brazil, he played for the Italy national team.

His previous clubs include Bellinzona, Parma, Napoli, Piacenza, Empoli, Messina, Chievo, Palermo, Juventus, Fiorentina and Fort Lauderdale Strikers. He made one appearance for the Italy national team in 2010.

== Club career ==
=== Early career ===
Amauri was trained at Palmeiras, the club of his place of birth, São Paulo state, but failed to impress. At the age of 19, he went to Santa Catarina state to work and played for a local club Santa Catarina at Santa Catarina State League 2nd Division. The club was invited to 2000 Torneo di Viareggio in Italy, at which he showed his talent to scouts; he was signed by a club from the Italian-speaking region of Switzerland, Bellinzona. He scored once in five appearances.

=== Parma and loans ===
After half a season in the Swiss Nationalliga B and Nationalliga A/B playoffs, Amauri played for Napoli in 2000–01 due to the abolishment of the non-EU quota. In a Lega Nazionale Professionisti record, Amauri joined Parma from Napoli in summer 2001 on free transfer, but Parma also paid Harold McKenzie $3.5 million, apparently the "true owner" of Amauri's playing rights. Officials from Parma also argued that Amauri was Parma-owned player since 2000, but that he was loaned to Napoli in 2001, in order to register the player. This was made public in the hearing of Caso Parmalat in 2010.

Amauri made his Serie A debut on 14 April 2001 in a league match against Bari. He played as one of the starting XI and was replaced by Francesco Moriero in the 69th minute. He then played for Piacenza in Serie A for the 2001–02 season (on loan from Parma, alongside Matuzalém), and for Messina in Serie B in 2002–03. He was also loaned from Parma to Empoli of Serie A in June 2002, along with teammate Gaetano Grieco, but left the club after the start of the 2002–03 Coppa Italia on 13 September, for Messina, before the start of Serie B, which was delayed. Amauri made his Messina club debut on 21 September 2002 in a 3–3 draw with Catania; he replaced Emanuele Calaiò in the 76th minute.

=== Chievo ===
In mid-2003, Amauri joined Chievo on a co-ownership deal, with Simone Barone's loan becoming permanent. With Sergio Pellissier and Federico Cossato, Amauri first played as a backup then as a second-striker. In June 2005, Chievo bought the remaining 50% of Amauri's registration rights from Parma. During his time with Chievo—particularly during the 2005–06 season, which ended in qualification to the preliminary phase of the UEFA Champions League (also favoured by the 2006 Serie A scandal)—Amauri showed most of his potential, becoming one of the key players of the team.

=== Palermo ===
On 31 August 2006, the last day of the 2006 summer transfer period, Amauri was sold to Palermo for €7 million cash plus Denis Godeas (valued at €700,000) after having scored two goals in the return match of the third qualifying round against Levski Sofia. Palermo had not had a prolific centre-forward since the departure of Luca Toni in 2005, and were in search for a viable partner for David Di Michele, as Andrea Caracciolo and Stephen Makinwa were not making a significant impact.

Immediately after his debut with Palermo, Amauri became a fan favourite and a key player for the Rosanero, scoring eight goals in 18 league matches until December 2006. However, a serious knee injury in a league match against Siena prevented him from playing for seven months. He recovered in time for the start of the 2007–08 season, immediately featuring in the starting lineup for Palermo's first league match against Roma. He scored his first goal in the new season in the next match, a 4–2 away win to Livorno.

=== Juventus, Parma and Fiorentina ===
On 30 May 2008, Amauri completed a €22.8 million move to Juventus, in which part of the fee was paid via player transfer (Antonio Nocerino, tagged for €7.5 million and half of the registration rights to Davide Lanzafame, tagged at €2.5 million). Towards the end of 2008, Amauri began to play more regularly under Claudio Ranieri and ended the year with 11 Serie A goals, the second-highest goal-total for Juventus. Amauri chose the number 11 jersey for the 2009–10 season while his former number 8 went to midfielder Claudio Marchisio. The season turned out to be a disaster, as it coincided with his goal droughts and a Juve squad decimated by injuries. He came under much criticism from fans for his yield of only five goals in 30 matches.

On 30 June 2010, due to irregularities of his transfer to Juventus and Palermo and third-party ownership, Amauri was fined along with his agents and numbers of staff of Juventus, Palermo and Chievo. It involved the irregularity of agents Stanislao Grimaldi and his son Mariano (representing both Amauri and Chievo at the same time, thus a conflict of interest), verbal agreement of Amauri with Palermo to waive some bonus of the 2007–08 season as part of the transfer; requesting Chievo to pay the agent 8% of the future transfer fee and requesting Palermo to pay €2 million in the transfer to Juventus.

The 2010–11 season started well for Amauri, as he scored a brace in the UEFA Europa League qualifying rounds against Shamrock Rovers. After that, however, he was benched for most games under new manager Luigi Delneri. On 31 January 2011, Amauri joined former club Parma on loan until 30 June 2011. He enjoyed an excellent few months at the club, scoring seven times in 11 games and playing a significant role in Parma securing their place in Serie A for another year, as he formed an attacking tandem with former Juve teammate Sebastian Giovinco.

Amauri returned to Juventus after his loan deal expired. Despite much talk that he was to be "offloaded", no concrete deal was ever made. However, Juventus write-down the residual value of Amauri's contract (which last until 30 June 2012) backdated to 2010–11 financial year, which worth €5.348 million on 30 June 2011 (~25% of €22.8million). Juventus also wrote in the official translated press release that "unnamed" player "will be free from any obligation vis-à-vis Juventus commencing from January 2012, and who is no longer included in the new technical programme". He remained in the squad for the 2011–12 season under manager Antonio Conte, but did not receive any call-ups. His number 11 shirt was also given to fullback Paolo De Ceglie.

After a protracted transfer saga, Amauri finally moved to Fiorentina for €500,000 on a permanent deal. Despite making little impact for the struggling Tuscan club, producing only one goal in 13 appearances, this sole Viola goal was a memorable one: on 7 April, in an away tie against then-league leaders Milan, Amauri completed his side's unlikely comeback to finish the match 1–2. This upset allowed Juventus to leapfrog Milan to the top of the table, in which they remained until the end of the season.

=== Return to Parma ===
On 2 July 2012, Amauri returned to Parma, signing a four-year contract. He scored his first two goals in his third spell at Parma on 21 October 2012, netting from the penalty spot and from open play as Parma defeated Sampdoria 2–1. Amauri helped fire the Ducali side to another victory in the club's next match, a 3–1 defeat of Torino, on 28 October. In Parma's first game following the Serie A winterbreak on 6 January 2013, Amauri came off the bench and scored a 90th-minute winner, helping Parma overcome his former club Palermo, 2–1. He powered his side to victory on 10 March, scoring three goals in 13 minutes as Parma came from behind to defeat Torino 4–1, snapping an eight-game losing streak.

=== Torino ===
On 1 September 2014, the last day of the summer transfer window, Amauri signed with Torino. On 23 October, he scored his first goal for the Granata in a 2–0 home win against HJK Helsinki, the third match during the group stage of the Europa League. On 1 February 2015, he scored his first goal for Torino in Serie A play in a 5–1 win against Sampdoria. In the 2015–16 season, he was excluded from the team by the manager Giampiero Ventura, having only played two matches between the league and Coppa Italia. On 11 February 2016, his contract was mutually rescinded, making him a free agent.

=== Fort Lauderdale Strikers ===
On 9 August 2016, the Fort Lauderdale Strikers of the North American Soccer League announced the signing of Amauri.

=== New York Cosmos ===
On 21 February 2017, New York Cosmos announced that they had come to terms with Amauri "pending a physical and league approval". On 1 August 2017, Amauri was released by New York.

== International career ==
Following his impressive performances when at Palermo, Amauri was suggested to be a potential call-up of the then Italy coach Roberto Donadoni, who stated he might be interested in calling him to the Italian squad. Amauri, who has not appeared at international level for Brazil, would have been indeed eligible in the future to play for the Italian national team because he was eligible to acquire Italian nationality by marriage to a Brazilian–Italian woman. According to Italian law, however, Amauri was forced to wait for at least one year from the day of the proclamation of his wife as an Italian citizen, which did not happen before April 2009. On 31 January 2009, Brazilian coach Dunga selected Amauri, who was still ineligible to play for Italy at the time, as a replacement for injured striker Luís Fabiano in an international friendly ironically against Italy. A few hours later, in the aftermath of a Juventus league game on the same day, Juventus Chairman Giovanni Cobolli Gigli stated the club's intention not to allow the player to respond to Brazil's call-up.

In November 2009, Amauri himself confirmed his decision to play for Italy instead of Brazil following remarks by Italian striker Giampaolo Pazzini, who was critical about the possibility of having a non-Italian-born player within the Azzurri squad. After receiving Italian citizenship in April 2010, Amauri finally became eligible to play for the Azzurri. Italy was scheduled to play two World Cup warm-up friendlies in June, who would feature players from a 30-men preliminary squad to be announced on 11 May, thus making Amauri unable to be featured in any of such friendly games without receiving a call-up to join such preliminary squad. Marcello Lippi, the Italy coach, said Amauri would be followed like all the other players and no certainly inclusion. Which Lippi did not ruled out a call-up to the foreign born player completely.

He [Amauri] will be followed like all the other players. I am taking this month to evaluate and take decisions that have to be made exclusively for the good of the national team.

–Marcello Lippi 13 April 2010

Lippi later expressed that he had confirmed 18 out of 23 players in his squad to the World Cup, and excluded Amauri from the 29-man squad of the training camp in Rome on 3–5 May. Amauri said he expected his exclusion as there were better players than him that season. On 6 August 2010, Amauri received his first call-up for the Italian national team as part of the squad announced by new head coach Cesare Prandelli for a friendly match against Ivory Coast, the first match after the 2010 World Cup. On 10 August, he started the match alongside fellow debutant Mario Balotelli, and Antonio Cassano, the latter making his first appearance in two years, in a new-look line-up. The Ivorians, however, won 1–0 at Upton Park, London.

== Style of play ==
Amauri has been described as a physically strong player with good technique, who excels in the air, and who is capable of taking advantage of chances and finishing well in the penalty area. He is a hardworking and opportunistic player, who is known for his offensive movement and ability to score goals or create space for teammates. Although he is usually deployed in the centre as a main striker, he is also capable of playing off of another forward as a second striker.

== Personal life ==
Amauri is married to fellow Brazilian Cynthia, whom he first met during his spell at Napoli. They have a daughter, Cindy, and a son, Hugo Leonardo. Cynthia received Italian nationality in March 2009, making Amauri eligible to obtain Italian nationality from March 2010. Amauri finally received his Italian citizenship on 12 April 2010 during a ceremony in Turin.

== Career statistics ==
=== Club ===
As of 29 September 2016

Club	Season	League			Cup		Europe		Total	
Club	Season	Division	Apps	Goals	Apps	Goals	Apps	Goals	Apps	Goals
Bellinzona	2000–01	Nationalliga B	5	1			–		5	1
Napoli	2000–01	Serie A	6	1	–		–		6	1
Piacenza	2001–02	Serie A	7	0	4	0	–		11	0
Messina	2002–03	Serie B	23	4			–		23	4
Chievo	2003–04	Serie A	29	4	1	0	–		30	4
Chievo	2004–05	Serie A	24	2			–		24	2
Chievo	2005–06	Serie A	37	11	3	3	–		40	14
Chievo	2006–07	Serie A	–		–		2	2	2	2
Chievo	Total		90	17	4	3	2	2	96	22
Palermo	2006–07	Serie A	18	8	1	0	–		19	8
Palermo	2007–08	Serie A	34	15	2	0	2	0	38	15
Palermo	Total		52	23	3	0	2	0	57	23
Juventus	2008–09	Serie A	32	12	2	0	10	2	44	14
Juventus	2009–10	Serie A	30	5	2	0	8	2	40	7
Juventus	2010–11	Serie A	9	0	1	0	6	3	16	3
Juventus	Total		71	17	5	0	24	7	100	24
Parma	2010–11	Serie A	11	7	–		–		11	7
Fiorentina	2011–12	Serie A	13	1	0	0	–		13	1
Parma	2012–13	Serie A	33	10	1	0	–		34	10
Parma	2013–14	Serie A	31	8	2	2	–		33	10
Parma	2014–15	Serie A	1	0	0	0	–		1	0
Parma	Total		76	25	3	2	0	0	79	27
Torino	2014–15	Serie A	20	1	1	0	7	2	28	3
Torino	2015–16	Serie A	1	0	1	0	–		2	0
Torino	Total		21	1	2	0	7	2	30	3
Fort Lauderdale Strikers	2016	NASL	13	5	–		–		13	5
Career total			378	96	21	5	35	11	426	108

=== International ===
As of 10 August 2010

Italy
Year	Apps	Goals
2010	1	0
Total	1	0

== Bibliography ==
- Aurelio, Benigno (2009). Amauri Carvalho De Oliveira. Dal Brasile alla Juve per coronare un sogno. Italy: Limina. p. 135. ISBN 978-88-6041-072-6.
