= Edinson Cavani =

Uruguayan footballer (born 1987)

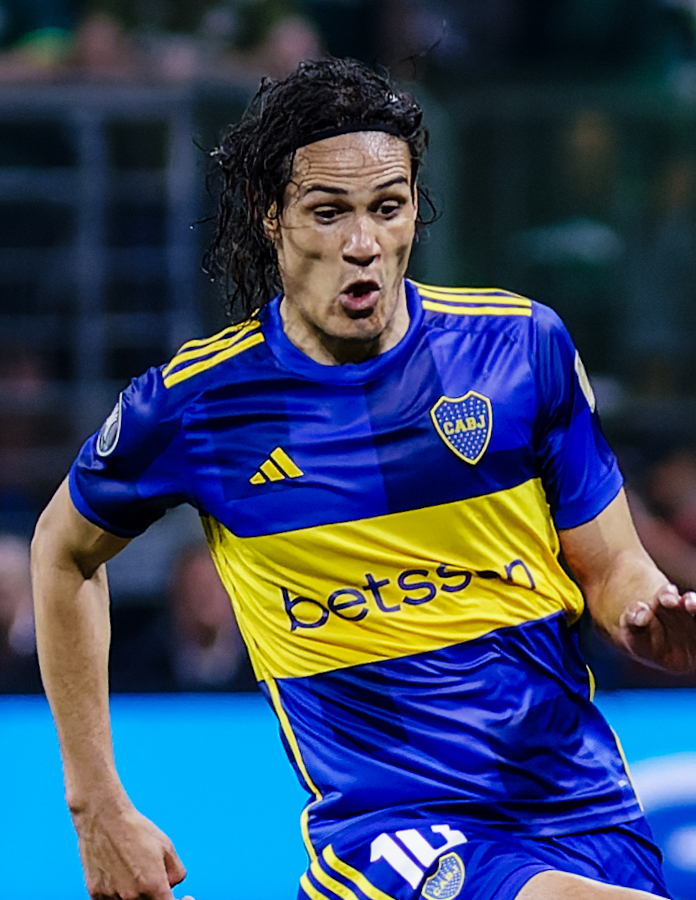
- Cavani with Boca Juniors in 2023

Personal information
- Full name: Edinson Roberto Cavani Gómez
- Date of birth: 14 February 1987 (age 39)
- Place of birth: Salto, Uruguay
- Height: 1.85 m (6 ft 1 in)
- Position: Striker

Youth career
- 2000–2005: Danubio

Senior career*
| Years | Team | Apps | (Gls) |
| 2005–2007 | Danubio | 15 | (5) |
| 2007–2010 | Palermo | 109 | (34) |
| 2010–2013 | Napoli | 104 | (78) |
| 2013–2020 | Paris Saint-Germain | 200 | (138) |
| 2020–2022 | Manchester United | 41 | (12) |
| 2022–2023 | Valencia | 25 | (5) |
| 2023–2026 | Boca Juniors | 60 | (16) |

International career
| 2006–2007 | Uruguay U20 | 15 | (11) |
| 2012 | Uruguay Olympic (O.P.) | 5 | (3) |
| 2008–2022 | Uruguay | 136 | (58) |
Medal record
Men's football
Representing Uruguay
Copa América
| Winner | 2011 Argentina |
- * Club domestic league appearances and goals as of 20 February 2026 (UTC)

Edinson Roberto Cavani Gómez (Spanish pronunciation: [ˈeðinsoŋ kaˈβani]; Italian: [kaˈvaːni]; born 14 February 1987) is a Uruguayan professional footballer who plays as a striker. Nicknamed "El Matador" (The Bullfighter), he is regarded as one of the best strikers of his generation. Cavani has scored over 400 club goals and has been frequently ranked as one of the best strikers of the century. He is known for his off the ball movement, work ethic, and finishing. Cavani is one of the few players to have scored 100 goals in two of Europe's big five leagues.

Cavani began his career playing for Danubio in Montevideo, where he played for two years, before moving to Italian side Palermo in 2007. In 2010, Cavani signed for Napoli, who signed him on an initial loan deal before buying him for a total fee of €17 million. He helped them win the Coppa Italia in 2012 and established himself as one of the best players in Serie A, finishing as the Serie A top scorer in the 2012–13 season. In mid-2013, Cavani joined French club Paris Saint-Germain for a reported €64 million, at the time the most expensive signing in French football history, and went on to be one of their most important players.

Although Cavani was frequently deployed on the left wing in a 4–3–3 due to Zlatan Ibrahimović's presence, he scored decisive goals in the 2014 Coupe de la Ligue final and the 2015 and 2016 Coupe de France final. After Ibrahimović left in 2016, Cavani returned to a centre-forward role. Despite PSG losing the Ligue 1 title in 2016–17, he scored 35 league goals and was named Ligue 1 Player of the Year. In 2017–18, he became the club's all-time top goalscorer at the time and finished as the league's top goalscorer for a second consecutive season as PSG reclaimed the Ligue 1 title. In total, he won six Ligue 1 titles. In 2020, Cavani signed with Manchester United before signing for Valencia in 2022 and Argentine club Boca Juniors in the following year.

Cavani scored on his Uruguay debut against Colombia in 2008, and went on to earn 136 caps and score 58 international goals, only behind strike partner Luis Suárez among Uruguayan internationals. He participated in ten major international tournaments: four FIFA World Cups (2010, 2014, 2018 and 2022), five Copas América (2011, 2015, 2016, 2019 and 2021), and one FIFA Confederations Cup (2013). Cavani scored at the 2010 World Cup to help Uruguay to fourth place in the tournament, and in 2011 was part of the Uruguay squad that won a record fifteenth Copa América title. He finished as the CONMEBOL 2018 World Cup qualification top scorer with ten goals. He was awarded the Golden Foot in 2018 for his achievements in football.

== Club career ==
=== Palermo ===
To this day. Batistuta wasn't a typical striker. A powerful footballer who was incredibly effective in front of goal. I always tried to copy him.

— Cavani on his idol growing up, Gabriel Batistuta.

After his breakthrough at the 2007 South American Youth Championship, several big teams were reportedly interested in signing Cavani, including Juventus and Milan. On 29 January 2007, however, Palermo chairman Maurizio Zamparini announced the signing of the promising Uruguayan. The bid was officially confirmed on 31 January for €4.475 million. Cavani made his debut on 11 March 2007 in a home league match against Fiorentina, coming on in the 55th minute with his team 1–0 down and scoring an impressive equaliser only 15 minutes later, a goal reminiscent of Marco van Basten's strike in the 1988 UEFA European Football Championship final. In his second season with the Rosanero, Cavani found himself fighting for a first team place with Fabrizio Miccoli and Amauri.

After Amauri's departure to Juventus in June 2008, Cavani cemented his place in the starting line-up, forming a striking partnership with Fabrizio Miccoli and scoring a total 14 goals in the 2008–09 season, earning the nickname "El Matador" due to his composure in front of goal. He retained his place for the 2009–10 season under new boss Walter Zenga, and also under successor Delio Rossi, being instrumental in the team's successful run in Serie A which took Palermo to European qualification and potential qualification to the UEFA Champions League with two games remaining. In April 2010, he signed a new contract with Palermo valid to June 2014.

=== Napoli ===
==== 2010–11: Adapting to Europe ====
In July 2010, Cavani signed for Napoli. The transfer, however, was a loan of €5 million plus an option/obligation to buy outright for €12 million, which made the total fee €17 million. After debuting for Napoli as a substitute in the previous game, Cavani scored twice in his first start, as Napoli beat Elfsborg in the UEFA Europa League 2–0 and qualified for the main tournament. He then started his Serie A tenure with Napoli scoring a controversial goal against Fiorentina after just seven minutes, with replays showing the ball landing on the line. Cavani also scored on his home debut against Bari before adding a late winner against Sampdoria, meaning he had scored in his first four competitive matches with Napoli.

On 26 September, Cavani came on as a late replacement with 30 minutes left in a game against Cesena which Napoli was losing 1–0. After assisting the equalising goal, he went on to score two more, with the scoreline finishing at 4–1. That meant Cavani shared the lead as top scorer in the league alongside Internazionale's Samuel Eto'o. Cavani's partnership with fellow forwards Ezequiel Lavezzi and Marek Hamšík led the Italian sporting media to dub them "The Three Tenors" after the famous singing group of the same name. On 15 December, Cavani netted a 92nd-minute goal against Steaua București to help his team to a 1–0 win and progress beyond the group stage of the Europa League. In the first match, which was held on Romanian soil, he had scored an equalising goal in the 97th minute. On 9 January 2011, Cavani scored a hat-trick during a 3–0 win over Juventus, the third goal coming by way of a diving header. On 30 January, Cavani scored another hat-trick, this time in a 4–0 win over Sampdoria. Cavani continued his fine form scoring a brace against Roma, with Napoli winning 2–0.

On 20 March, Cavani scored another brace against Cagliari in a 2–1 win. This win kept them within three points of leaders Milan with eight games left. On 3 April, Cavani scored yet another hat-trick in a 4–3 comeback win over Lazio, having been 2–0 and 3–2 down during the game. He also became the highest league goalscorer in a single season in Napoli's history, netting 25 goals in Serie A. On 8 May, in a 2–1 away loss against Lecce, he received a red card for two bookable offences. He sarcastically applauded the referee after the decision and was handed a two-match ban for the action. As Napoli only had two more games of the season, it meant that his season was over and that he would not be able to regain his top position in the Serie A scoring charts, as Antonio Di Natale had surpassed him with 26 goals. Cavani signed a new five-year contract on 19 May, keeping him at Napoli until 2016.

==== 2011–13: Coppa Italia win and Serie A top scorer ====
On 14 September, Cavani scored the opener in Napoli's first game of their Champions League campaign, a 1–1 away draw at Manchester City. Four days later, on 18 September, he scored a hat-trick against Milan in Napoli's 3–1 home win. On 22 November, Cavani scored both goals in the match winning brace 2–1 at home against Manchester City in the Champions League, leaving Napoli in pole position to follow Bayern Munich into the knockout stage. On 26 November, Cavani scored a 94th-minute equaliser against Atalanta after Napoli went a goal down in the 64th minute through on-loan Napoli striker Germán Denis. On 21 December, Cavani netted a brace in Napoli's 6–1 thrashing of Genoa, helping the Azzurri finish 2011 strong and end the first half of the season in sixth place.

On 17 February 2012, Cavani scored two goals against Fiorentina, helping Napoli go in fifth place ahead of Internazionale. On 21 February, Cavani scored the second goal against Chelsea in the Champions League round of 16 first leg in Naples. He also provided the assists for both of Ezequiel Lavezzi's goals that game. Napoli subsequently went on to win this game 3–1. Following Napoli's exit from the Champions League at the hands of Chelsea, Cavani scored two goals against Udinese in the last ten minutes to earn a much-needed draw to keep Napoli in the hunt for the last Champions League qualifying spot. A few days later, he converted a fantastic counter-attack against Siena to book Napoli a place in the Coppa Italia final. On 21 April, he celebrated his 200th career league appearance by scoring in a 2–0 win against Novara. Cavani finished the league season with 23 goals, tied for third on the goal scoring charts with Udinese striker Antonio Di Natale. On 20 May, Cavani scored a penalty against Juventus in the 2012 Coppa Italia final at the Stadio Olimpico, Rome, which Napoli won 2–0. Cavani finished the tournament as the top goalscorer, with five goals.

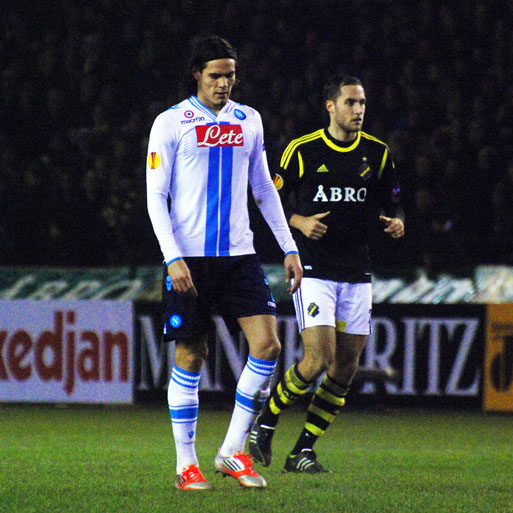
Cavani playing against AIK in the UEFA Europa League in November 2012

Cavani's first goal of the Serie A season came on 26 August, netting the final goal of Napoli's 3–0 defeat of former club Palermo. A month later, on 26 September, Cavani scored a mesmerising hat-trick against Lazio to maintain Napoli's undefeated start to the Serie A season in a 3–0 win.

On 8 November, Cavani scored all four goals, including a half-volley from outside the box and a tremendous free kick, as Napoli came back from 2–1 down to defeat Dnipro Dnipropetrovsk 4–2 in the group stage of the Europa League. Cavani scored a late penalty in the 94th minute to secure a 2–1 victory over Swedish side AIK on 22 November, sending Napoli through to the next round of the Europa League. Cavani was the last player ever to score on the Råsunda Stadium which was the stadium that hosted the 1958 FIFA World Cup final. On 6 January 2013, Cavani netted a perfect hat-trick as Napoli thumped Roma 4–1, gaining ground in the race for the league title as champions Juventus fell to a shock win. Cavani finished the season as leading Serie A goalscorer, with 29 goals, six ahead of Udinese striker Antonio Di Natale in second.

Towards the end of the season, reports emerged that Cavani would leave Napoli, with Chelsea, Manchester City, Paris Saint-Germain and Real Madrid all believed to be interested. On 27 May 2013, however, he told that he was not thinking of moving, saying, "Real Madrid, Chelsea and [Manchester] City are interested in me? I just think about Napoli." Nonetheless, he continued, "If an important offer were to come in, I will talk with president [Aurelio] De Laurentiis". He then paid tribute to his time in Italy, saying, "I'm fine in Italy, I have grown as a man there and as a player with the Serie A experience". Cavani was asked about the interest Chelsea and Manchester City took in him, saying, "I don't know if they made an offer for me, I just know that to be coached by someone like [Man City manager] Manuel Pellegrini or [Chelsea manager] José Mourinho would always be a pleasure". On 23 June, Napoli club president Aurelio De Laurentiis revealed that Cavani's reported £53 million "buyout clause expires" on 10 August 2013.

=== Paris Saint-Germain ===
On 16 July 2013, Cavani joined French champions Paris Saint-Germain on a five-year contract, for a fee believed to be around €64 million, making it the sixth largest transfer in history, at the time. The reported sum made Cavani the record signing in French football, breaking Radamel Falcao's €60 million move to Monaco earlier in the summer, and saw him link up with former Napoli teammate Ezequiel Lavezzi in Paris.

==== 2013–16: Debut season and back-to-back domestic quadruples ====
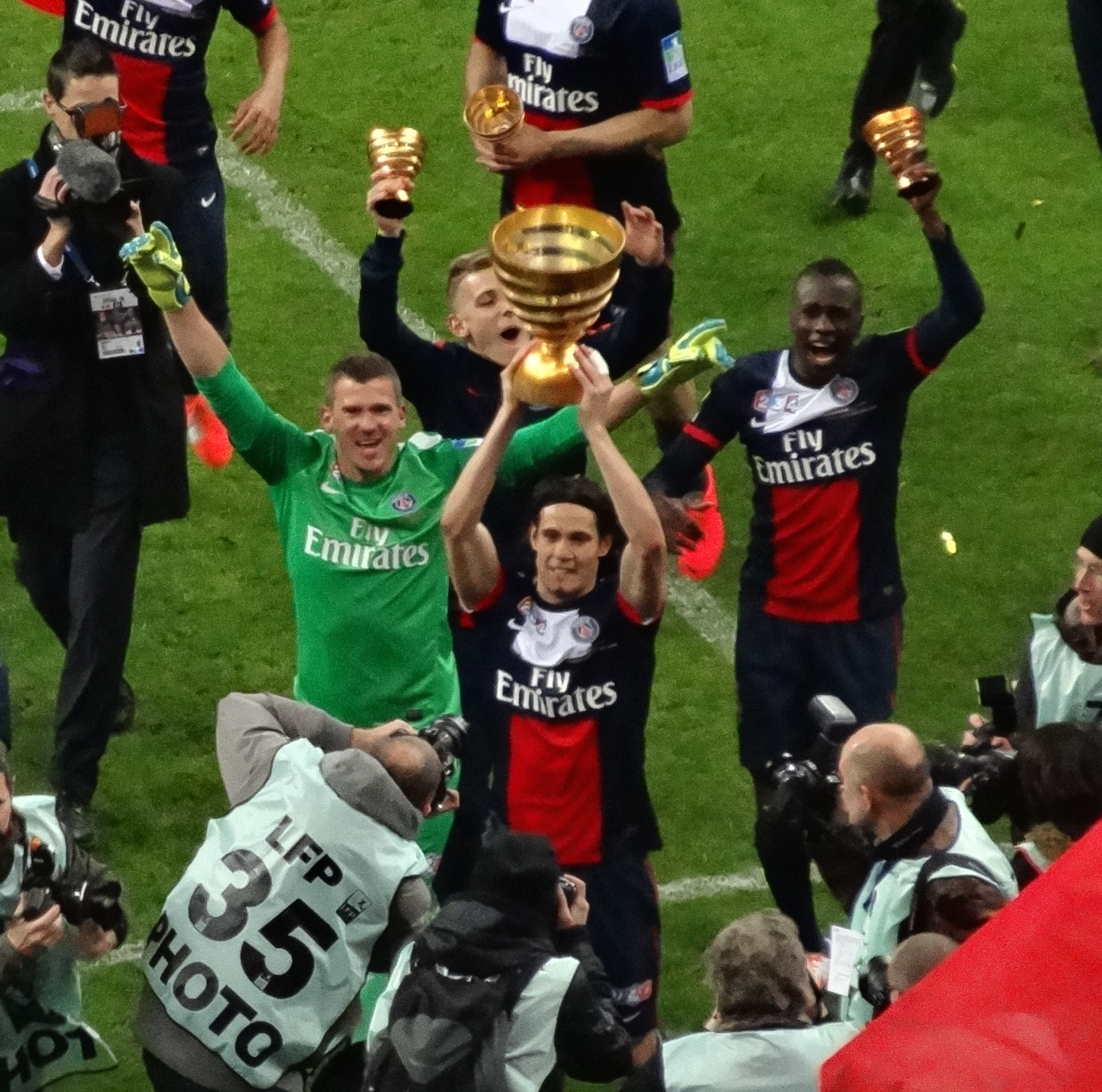
Cavani (middle) celebrating after the Coupe de la Ligue final in April 2014

Cavani debuted for PSG on 9 August, coming on as a 72nd-minute substitute for Lavezzi in a league match against Montpellier. He started the following game on 18 August and scored his first goal for the club, a late equaliser against Ajaccio. Cavani scored his first Champions League goal for the club in their European season opener against Olympiacos on 17 September. He ended the group stage with four goals from five matches as PSG qualified with a 100% win record.

On 22 January 2014, Cavani scored his 20th goal of the season in PSG's 2–1 Coupe de France defeat at home to Montpellier. On 2 March, after missing a month of the season with a thigh injury, Cavani scored on his return to the team in a 2–0 win over Le Classique rivals Marseille at the Parc des Princes.

On 19 April, he scored both goals for PSG as they beat Lyon 2–1 in the 2014 Coupe de la Ligue Final. He finished his first season with 25 goals in 43 games across all competitions, including 16 in 30 league games.

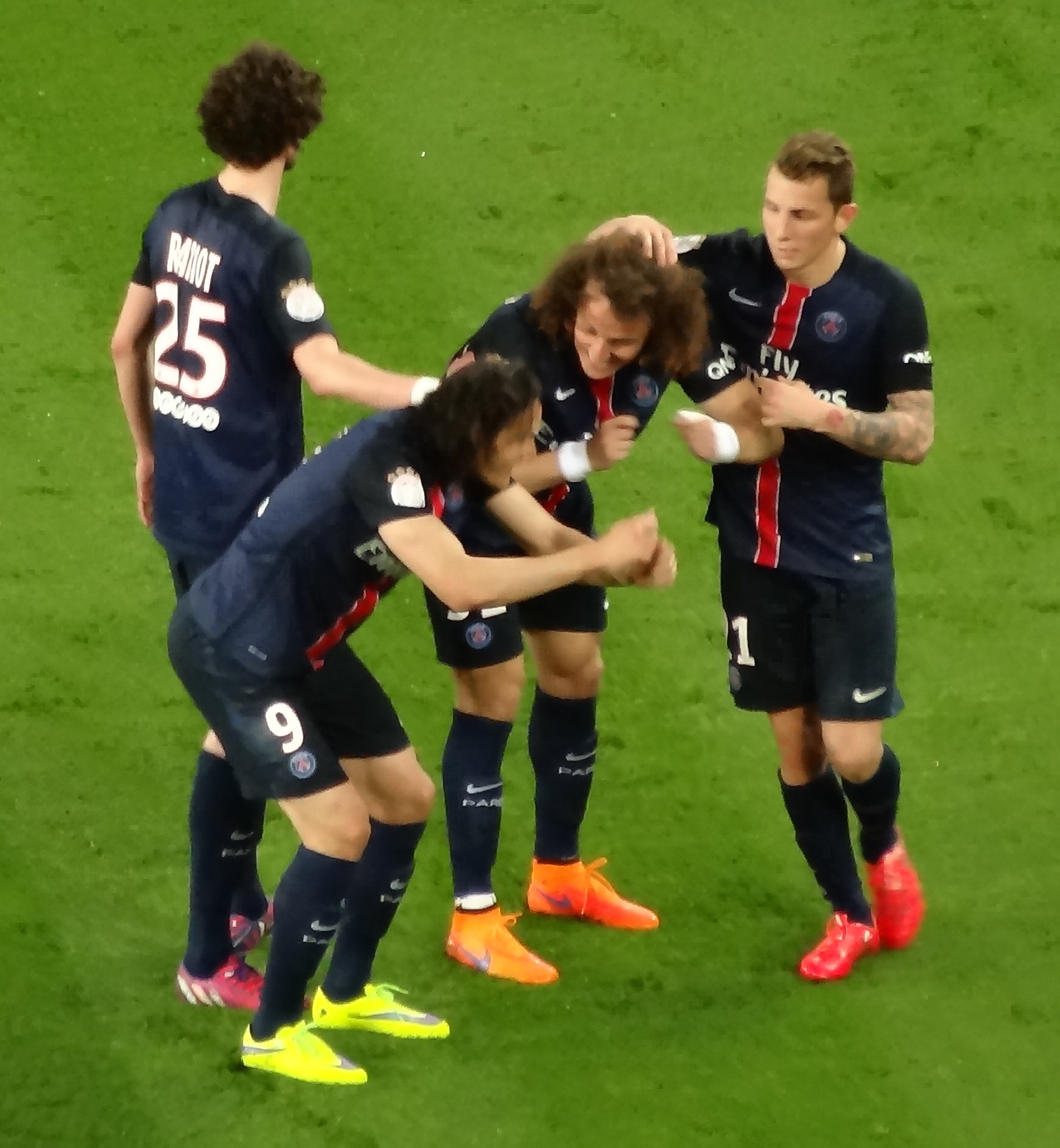
Cavani (number 9) celebrating a goal with his teammates in a Ligue 1 win against Reims in May 2015

Cavani scored a penalty to secure a 3–1 win at Lens on 17 October 2014, and celebrated by shooting an imaginary bow and arrow. Referee Nicolas Rainville booked him for this, and sent him off for dissent after Cavani complained about it. PSG club president Nasser Al-Khelaifi said to Canal+, "Why did he get the yellow card before? He always celebrates the same way." On 5 November 2014, it took Cavani 56 seconds to score the only goal of the game against Cypriot club APOEL, a result which put PSG into the Champions League knock-out stage with two games to spare.

In January 2015, Cavani and Ezequiel Lavezzi were fined and suspended for two matches by PSG manager Laurent Blanc for missing a mid-season training camp in Morocco and the first training session after the winter break. On 11 April, he scored two goals as a second-half substitute for Lavezzi as PSG defeated Bastia 4–0 to win the 2015 Coupe de la Ligue Final. On 8 May, he scored a hat-trick in a 6–0 defeat of Guingamp, which gave PSG a six-point lead in Ligue 1 with two matches remaining. With the title retained, PSG sealed a domestic treble on 30 May when Cavani headed the only goal of the game – his 31st in all competitions that season – to defeat Auxerre in the Coupe de France final.

Cavani and PSG kicked off the season against Lyon for the 2015 Trophée des Champions on 1 August, with him scoring the second goal of a 2–0 victory. On 21 May 2016, Cavani scored the decisive third goal of PSG's 4–2 2016 Coupe de France Final win over Marseille to record a second consecutive Ligue 1–Coupe de France–Coupe de la Ligue domestic treble for the club.

==== 2016–18: Ligue 1 Player of the Year and PSG's all-time top goalscorer ====
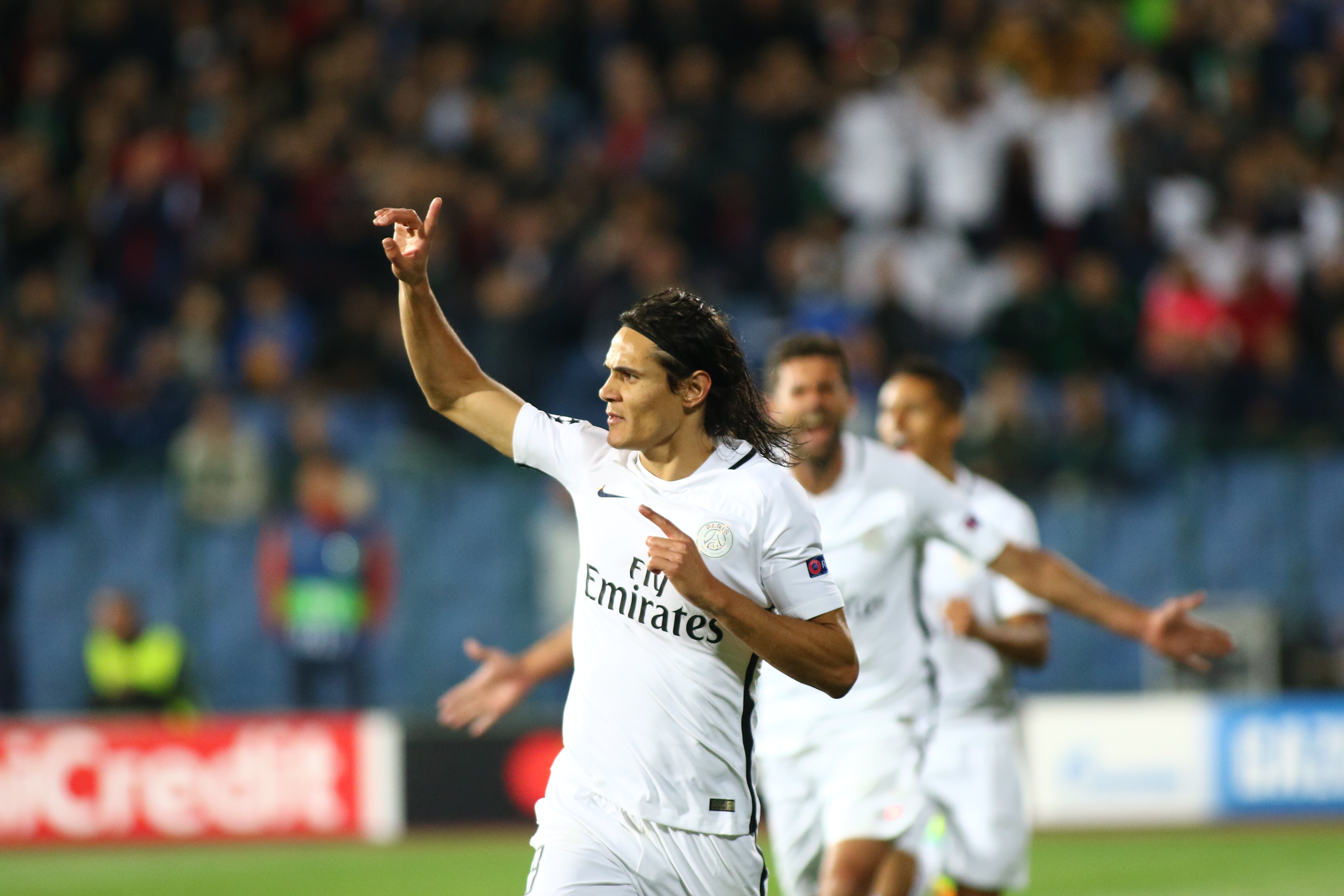
Cavani after scoring a goal against Ludogorets Razgrad in the UEFA Champions League in September 2016

On 13 September 2016, in the opening 2016–17 Champions League Group A match against Arsenal at the Parc des Princes, Cavani scored after just 44 seconds had elapsed in the first half by heading in Serge Aurier's cross from the right for PSG's fastest-ever Champions League goal. The match ended in a 1–1 draw. On 16 September, Cavani scored four times (his first ever four-goal haul with PSG) in the first half as PSG trounced Caen 6–0 away in a Ligue 1 match to end PSG's streak of three competitive matches without victory, two of them in Ligue 1. On 30 November, he scored a penalty in a 2–0 home win against Angers to take his Ligue 1 tally to 14 goals in 14 matches, which also saw him become only the fourth player in PSG history to score 100 competitive goals for the club.

Cavani scored one goal in each leg of PSG's 6–5 aggregate loss to FC Barcelona in their UEFA Champions League round of 16 tie, taking him to eight goals from eight matches in the season's competition. On 1 April 2017, he scored two second-half goals in PSG's 4–1 win over Monaco in the 2017 Coupe de la Ligue Final. On 15 May 2017, he was named Ligue 1 Player of the Year for scoring 35 goals.

Prior to the 2017–18 season, Cavani was joined at the club by Brazilian forward Neymar, who moved to PSG in a transaction worth €222 million making him the world's most expensive player, and 18-year-old French prodigy Kylian Mbappé, a loan signing with the club having an option to sign him for €180 million. Cavani, Neymar and Mbappé immediately formed a formidable attacking trio, with Cavani scoring in each of PSG's opening three games of the 2017–18 UEFA Champions League group stage, twice in the team's 5–0 win at Celtic, once in the 3–0 win at home to Bayern Munich, and once in the 4–0 win at Anderlecht.

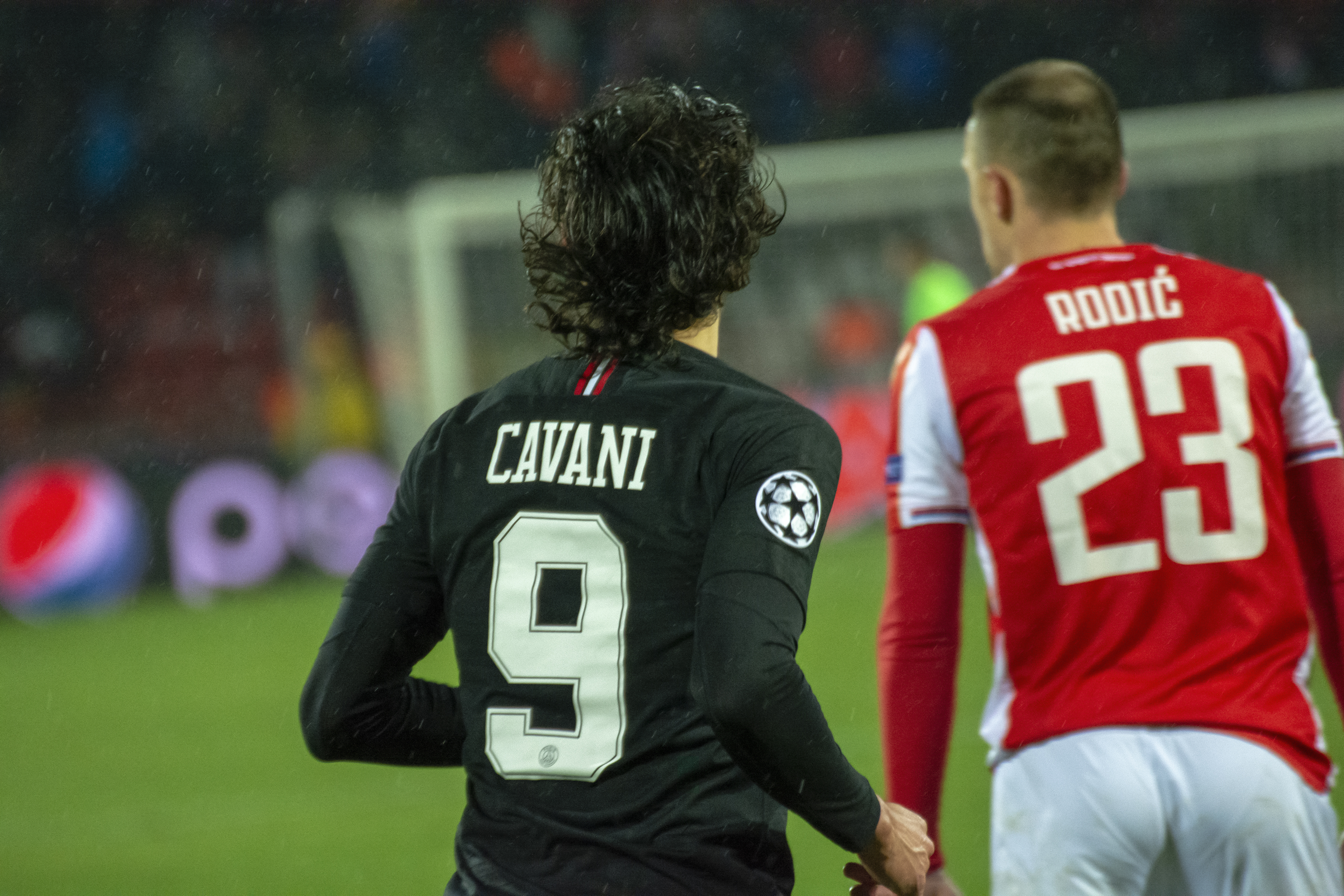
Cavani during a Champions League match against Red Star Belgrade in December 2018

On 22 October, Cavani scored a curling free kick off the crossbar to earn PSG a 2–2 draw in Le Classique away to Marseille. The following month, he scored twice in the return leg against Celtic in a 7–1 win. The result saw PSG break the record for the most goals scored by a club in the group stages of the Champions League, with 24. On 4 November, Cavani's goals in a 5–0 win at Angers made him only the third player to score 100 times in two of Europe's five best leagues, after Ibrahimović and Gonzalo Higuaín.

Cavani became PSG's all-time top scorer on 27 January 2018 with a goal in a 4–0 home win over Montpellier. He surpassed Zlatan Ibrahimović's record with his 157th goal in his 229th match. On 8 May 2018, he scored as PSG won 2–0 against Les Herbiers VF to clinch the 2017–18 Coupe de France.

==== 2018–20: Final seasons in Paris ====
On 25 August 2018, Cavani played his first game of the season after missing PSG's first three games following his injury at the 2018 World Cup. The front three of Cavani, Neymar and Mbappé all scored in a 3–1 league win over Angers at home, with Cavani scoring the opener from Neymar's assist. On 11 November 2018, Cavani scored a hat-trick in a 4–0 win over Monaco. On 18 December, Cavani scored in PSG's 2–1 win over Orléans in the Coupe de La Ligue; this was his 15th goal all-time in the competition, tying Pauleta's record for most goals in the tournament.

In April 2020, PSG were assigned the 2019–20 Ligue 1 title after the season was ended prematurely due to the outbreak of the COVID-19 pandemic; at the time of the League's suspension, PSG were in first place, with a twelve–point lead over second-placed Marseille. On 13 June, PSG's sporting director Leonardo revealed that Cavani would be leaving the club at the end of the Champions League campaign in August, alongside his teammate Thiago Silva. However, it was later revealed that, unlike Silva, Cavani had refused a short-term two-month contract extension that would allow him to see out the rest of the delayed Champions League campaign (including the final), the Coupe de la Ligue final and the Coupe de France final, and he left the club upon the expiry of his original contract on 30 June.

=== Manchester United ===
==== 2020–22: Europa League runner-up and final season ====
On 5 October 2020, Cavani joined Premier League club Manchester United on a one-year deal with an option to extend for a further year. He was given the prestigious number 7 shirt. On 24 October, he made his Premier League debut from the bench in a 0–0 draw against Chelsea. On 7 November, Cavani scored his first goal in the Premier League in a 3–1 away win against Everton. On 29 November, Cavani scored twice, including the winning goal in added time, in a 3–2 comeback win against Southampton after coming on as a half-time substitute.

On 2 February 2021, he scored the fourth goal in United's Premier League record-equalling 9–0 win against Southampton. On 29 April, he scored twice and assisted two more goals in a 6–2 home win over Roma in the first leg of the Europa League semi-finals; he scored another two in a 3–2 defeat in the return leg, which allowed United to advance to the final 8–5 on aggregate. Across April, Cavani scored five goals and collected three man of the match award from four starts which lead to him winning his first Manchester United player of the month award.

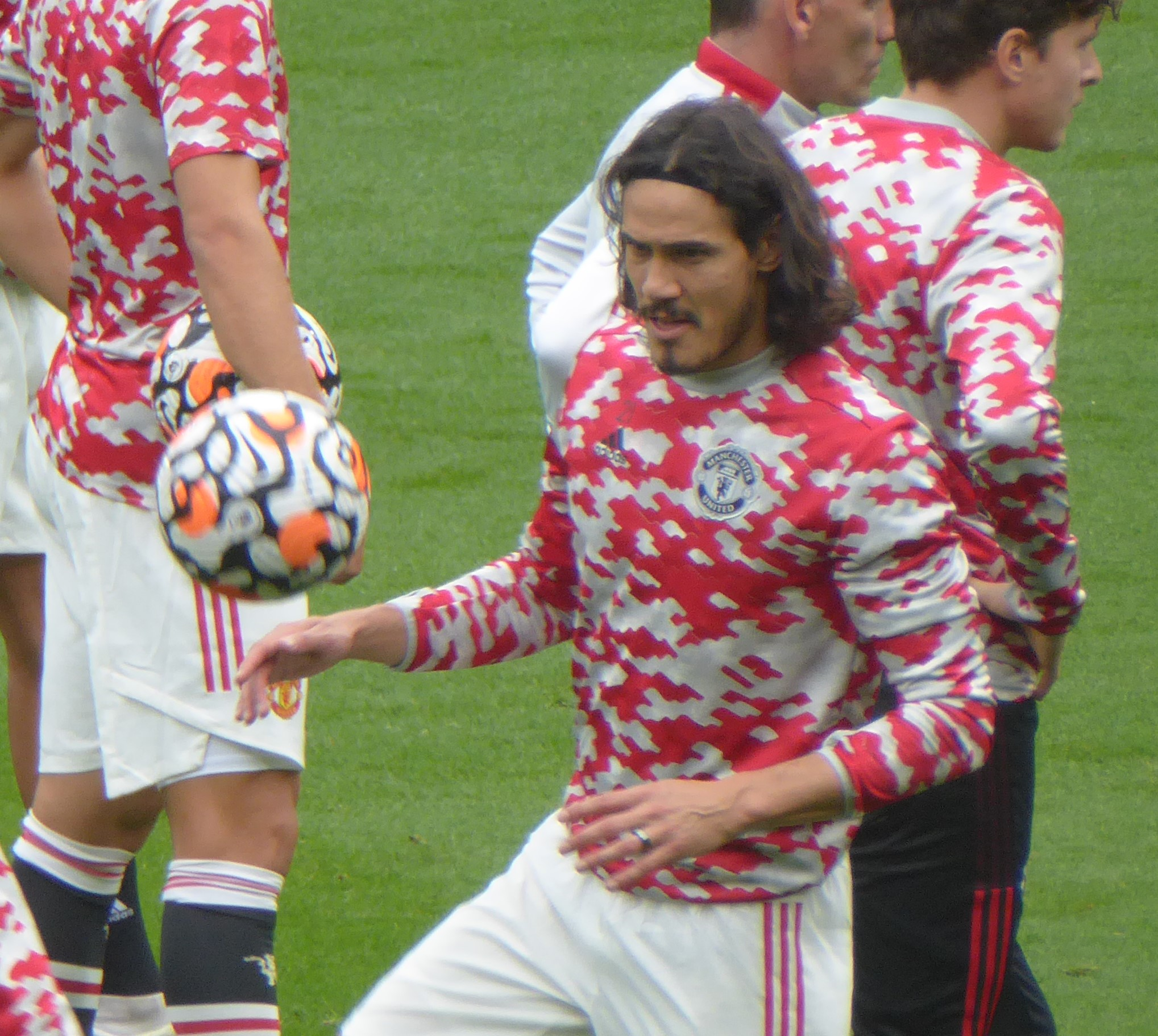
Cavani training for Manchester United prior to a Premier League match against Aston Villa in September 2021

On 10 May, Cavani officially extended his stay for another season. On 18 May, in an eventual 1–1 home draw against Fulham, Cavani scored the first goal at Old Trafford with fans in attendance since the start of the COVID-19 pandemic, a 40-yard lob. He was later awarded Premier League Goal of the Month for his effort. On 26 May, he scored the equalising goal in a 1–1 draw against Villarreal in the Europa League Final; however, Manchester United lost eventually on penalties, despite Cavani netting his spot kick in the shoot-out.

Even though Cavani played his first match of the 2021–22 season against Wolverhampton Wanderers in the number 7 shirt, upon the arrival of Cristiano Ronaldo, he agreed to switch to the number 21 shirt, the same number he wears for the Uruguay national team. He scored his first goal of the season, in a 3–0 away win on 30 October against Tottenham Hotspur, assisted by Ronaldo.

On 22 May 2022, interim-manager Ralf Rangnick announced that Cavani would be leaving the club when his contract expired at the end of season.

=== Valencia ===
On 29 August 2022, Valencia announced the signing of Cavani with a two-year contract. He made his debut in La Liga on 17 September by starting in a 3–0 home win over Celta Vigo; he had been under anaesthetic for six hours the day before, having caught his finger in the boot of his car while moving house. On 15 October, he scored his first goals in a 2–2 draw with Elche also at the Mestalla Stadium.

Cavani scored another two goals on 16 January 2023 in a 4–0 win away to Sporting Gijón in the last 16 of the Copa del Rey. These were his last goals for Valencia, ending his spell on 29 July with 28 games and 7 goals.

=== Boca Juniors ===
On 29 July 2023, Cavani joined Boca Juniors on a free transfer and a deal running until December 2024. Two days later, Boca Juniors presented him at an unveiling ceremony as their new signing. On 9 August, he made his debut for the club in the 2023 Copa Libertadores round of 16 match against Nacional; ten days later he scored his first goal in a 3–1 home win over Platense in the Copa de la Liga Profesional. On 6 October he opened a 1–1 draw with Palmeiras in the semi-finals of the Libertadores; in the ensuing penalty shootout he missed Boca's first attempt, though the Xeneizes still advanced. He played in the 2–1 extra-time loss in the final to Fluminense at the Maracanã Stadium.

On 3 March 2024, Cavani ended a goalscoring drought of nearly five months by netting a hat-trick in a 3–2 win over Belgrano de Córdoba in the Copa de la Liga Profesional. In October, he extended his contract until the end of 2026. He told Olé that he wished to retire at Boca Juniors.

Boca Juniors terminated Cavani's contract in June 2026, after manager Rodolfo Arruabarrena stated he would not need his services as player of the senior team. Cavani bid farewell to Boca Juniors on 2 July after making 81 appearances and scoring 28 goals for the club.

== International career ==
=== Youth ===
In January 2007, Cavani was selected to join the Uruguay national under-20 team to play in the 2007 South American Youth Championship in Paraguay. He finished the tournament as top scorer with seven goals in nine games, helping Uruguay to finish in third place, thereby earning them a place in the 2007 FIFA U-20 World Cup.

=== Senior ===
==== 2010 World Cup, 2011 Copa América, 2012 Olympics and 2013 Confederations Cup ====
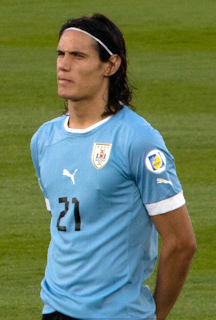
Cavani prior to a match against Chile in November 2011

On 6 February 2008, Cavani debuted for the Uruguayan senior team in a 2–2 draw against Colombia, scoring from his own area on the counterattack from a corner. The same year on 22 June, in the final match of the group stage of the 2010 World Cup, Cavani set-up a goal for Luis Suárez in a 1–0 victory over Mexico. Uruguay won Group A and advanced to the knockout stage. On 10 July, he scored against Germany in the third place match to make the score 1–1; Germany went on to win 3–2.

On 8 October 2010, Cavani scored his first international hat-trick in a 7–1 friendly victory against Indonesia, where Luis Suárez also scored a hat-trick.

Cavani was included in the Uruguayan squad at the 2011 Copa América in Argentina. He started the first two group games, but a knee injury in the second game against Chile ruled him out until the final. In the final, he replaced Álvaro Pereira after 63 minutes, and was involved in his team's final goal as Uruguay beat Paraguay 3–0 won a record 15th title.

Cavani was one of the three over-age players selected by Uruguay for the 2012 Summer Olympics.

At the 2013 FIFA Confederations Cup, Cavani equalised in the semi-final against the hosts and eventual champions Brazil, who eventually won 2–1. In the match for third place, he equalised twice against Italy, his second goal coming from a free kick, taking the game to penalties. Although Cavani scored his spot kick, Uruguay lost; he was named man of the match for his performance.

==== 2014 World Cup, 2018 World Cup, 2019 Copa América and retirement ====
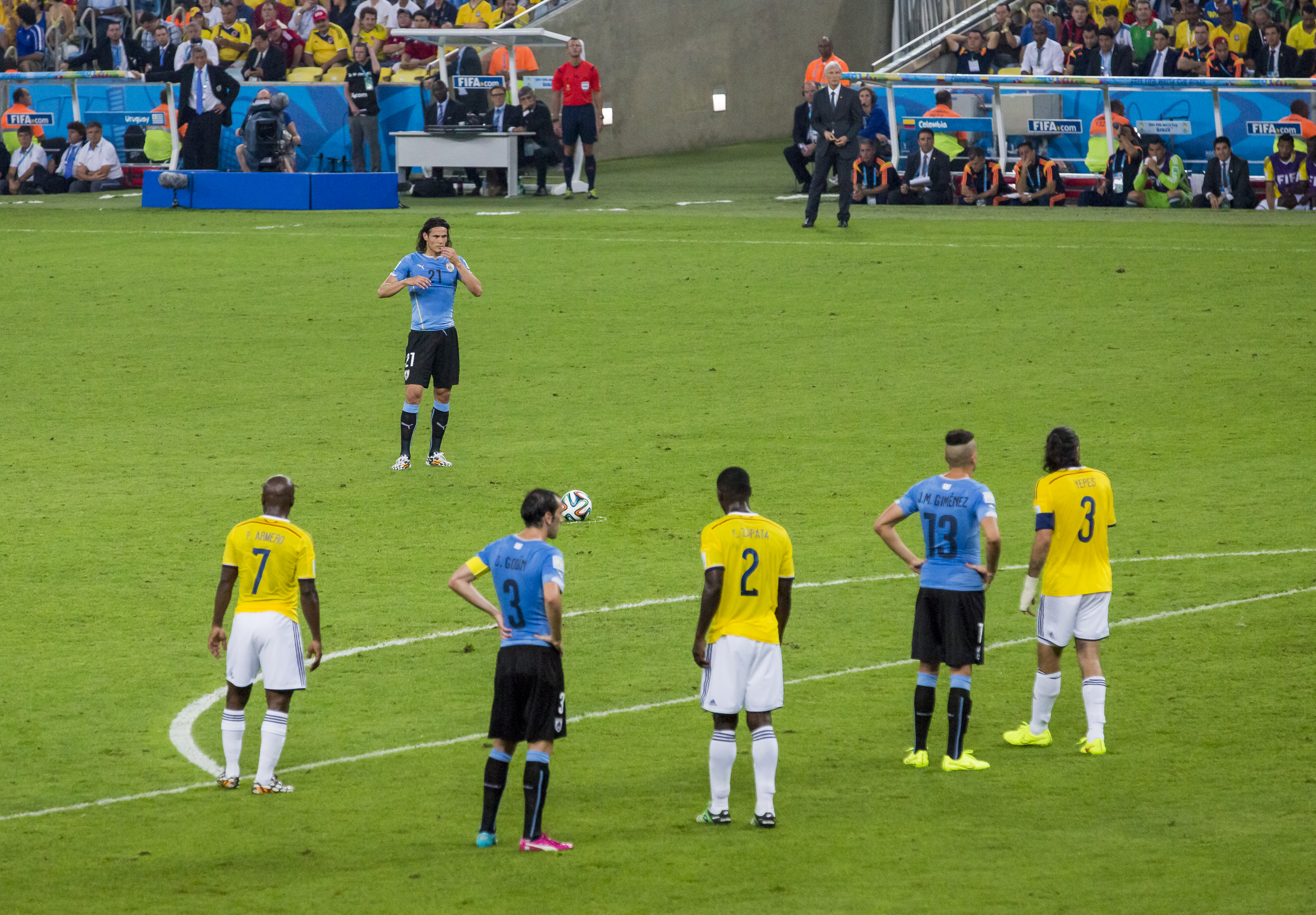
Cavani waiting to take a free-kick in the round of 16 game against Colombia at the 2014 FIFA World Cup

On 13 November 2013, Cavani scored the last goal in Uruguay's 5–0 away win over Jordan in a play-off for the 2014 World Cup. In their first group game of the finals, against Costa Rica in Fortaleza, Cavani opened the scoring with a penalty after Diego Lugano had been pulled down. Uruguay, however, eventually lost 3–1. Uruguay were eliminated by Colombia, following a 2–0 defeat in the round of 16 on 28 June 2014.

With Suárez suspended for the entire tournament, Cavani was an undisputed starter for Uruguay at the 2015 Copa América in Chile. In the quarter-finals against the hosts at the Estadio Nacional, Cavani was sent off for two bookings: the first for a foul on Arturo Vidal, the second for flicking at Gonzalo Jara's face after Jara had poked him in the buttocks. Teammate Jorge Fucile was later also dismissed, and holders Uruguay were eliminated with a 1–0 defeat. Cavani also took part in the Copa América Centenario the following year, but he once again went scoreless in the competition, as Uruguay were eliminated in the first round.

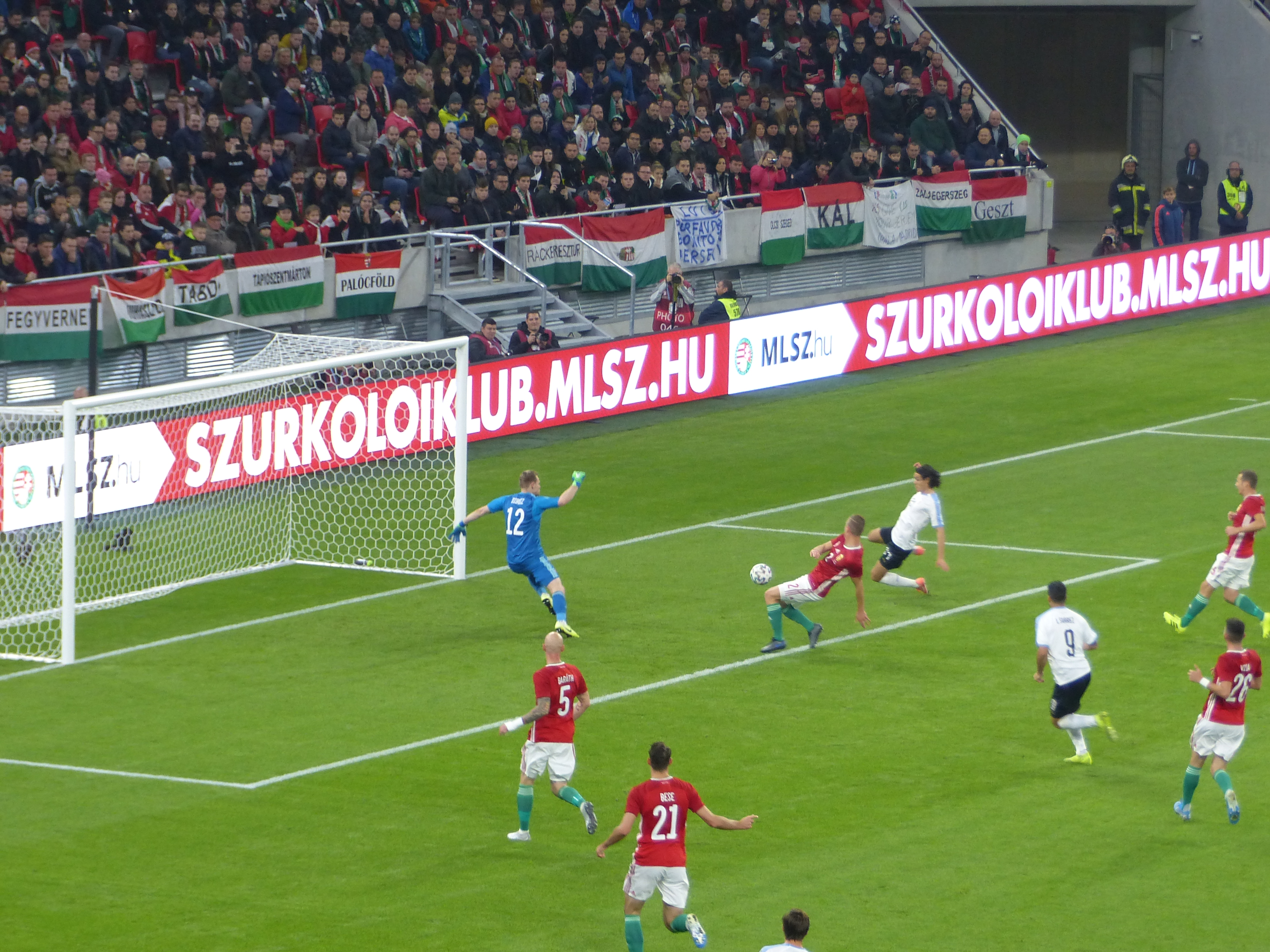
Cavani scoring a goal against Hungary in November 2019

In 2018, Uruguay participated in the China Cup. Cavani led Uruguay to the trophy by scoring the only goal in the final match against Wales. Cavani finished as the top scorer in the CONMEBOL 2018 FIFA World Cup qualification, with 10 goals. In March 2018, Cavani was part of the Uruguay squad that won the China Cup. He scored in the 2–0 semi-final win over the Czech Republic, and in the final he scored the only goal against Wales, his 100th cap. In his nation's final group game of the 2018 FIFA World Cup on 25 June, Cavani scored Uruguay's final goal in a 3–0 win over hosts Russia. Cavani then went on to score both of Uruguay's goals against Portugal in a 2–1 victory in the Round of 16 on 30 June, though he was withdrawn in the second half with an apparent hamstring injury. Because of his injury, he was ruled out of Uruguay's 2–0 defeat to France in the quarter-finals on 6 July.

In March 2019, manager Óscar Tabárez included Cavani in the final 23-man Uruguay squad for the 2019 Copa América in Brazil. On 16 June, Cavani scored "an acrobatic bicycle-kick" in a 4–0 win over Ecuador in the team's opening group match of the tournament; this was his first goal ever in the Copa América. In the quarter-finals against Peru on 29 June, he had a goal disallowed by VAR for offside in regulation time; following a 0–0 draw, the match went to a penalty shoot-out. Although Cavani was able to convert his spot-kick, Peru won the shoot-out 5–4, which saw Uruguay eliminated from the competition.

On 30 May 2024, Cavani announced his retirement from the national team. His last match was in Uruguay's 2–0 victory over Ghana in the group stages of the 2022 FIFA World Cup, on 2 December.

== Style of play ==
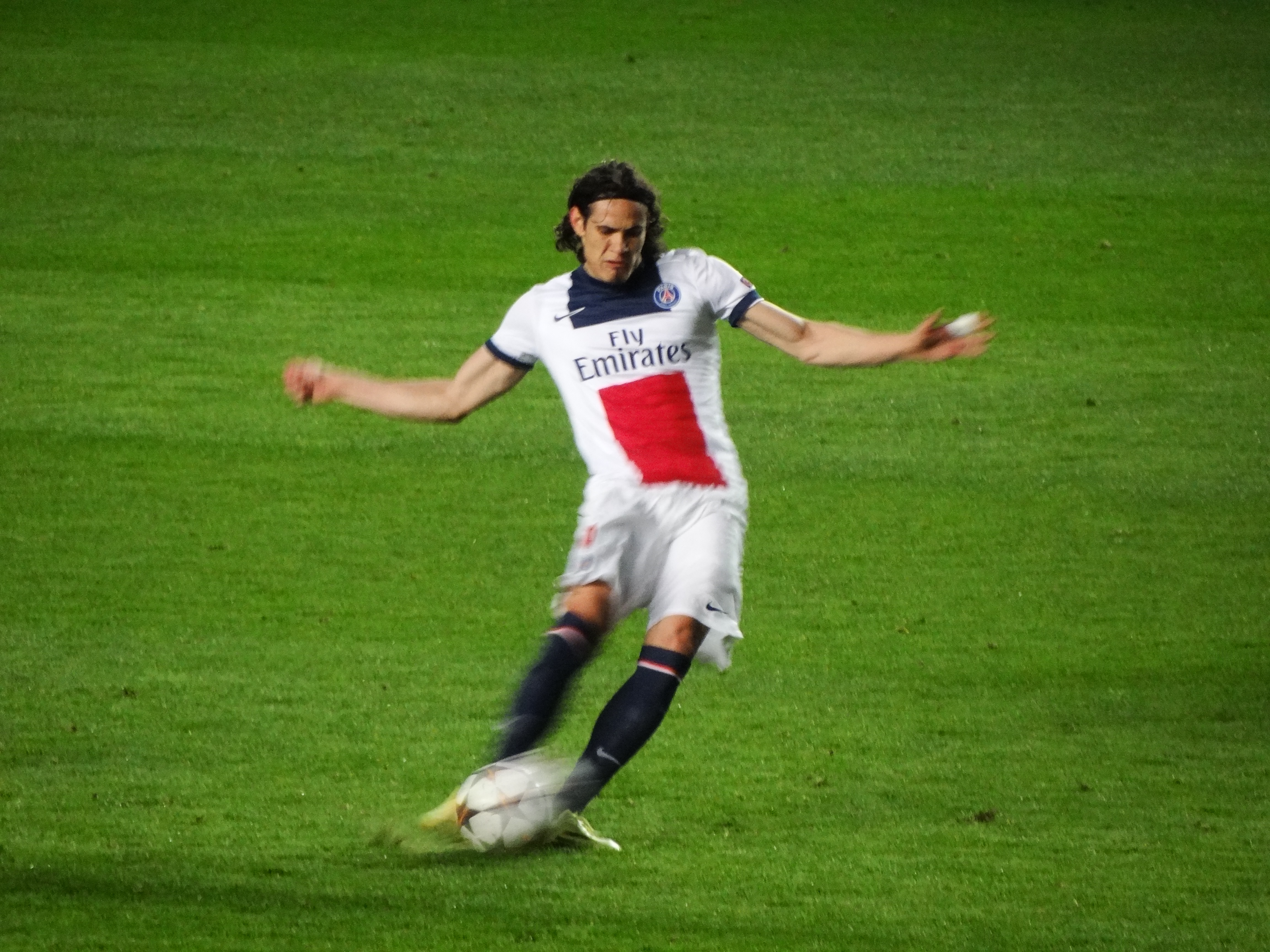
Cavani striking the ball for PSG in 2014

Although Cavani primarily plays either as a centre forward or as a main striker, he is capable of playing in several offensive positions, and has also been deployed as a supporting striker or as a winger. Due to his composure in front of goal, he was given the nickname "El Matador" ('The Bullfighter' in Spanish) during his time in Italy. In addition to his goalscoring, Cavani is also known for his ability to create space for his teammates.

Cavani's movement in the penalty area has received praise from coaches and teammates. His former Napoli manager Walter Mazzarri described him as "a strong player athletically" who is "the biggest threat in the penalty area". His PSG teammate Ángel Di María said, "His movement is great, he knows how to get away from his marker and he always pops up in the right place in the area. He always tries to anticipate what his marker will do." Manchester United manager Ole Gunnar Solskjær described him as "one of the cleverest and best movers in the box", while teammate Mason Greenwood remarked: "I've never seen a striker do as many movements... he does probably the same movement about six or seven times a game." Football publications have also highlighted Cavani's intelligence away from the ball as one of his most important assets. FourFourTwo described his movement as "elite" and "a symphony" of feints, changes of direction and spatial awareness, arguing that his off-the-ball play made him "a world-class exponent of modern forward play". Writing for The Guardian in 2018, Jorge Valdano remarked upon "the generous endeavour of Cavani, a striker who covers the entire pitch".

However, despite being a prolific player, and having a reputation as one of the best strikers of his generation, Cavani has been accused at times in the media of missing an excessive number of chances, and has also been criticised on occasion for his performances in important matches. He has also struggled with injuries throughout his career.

Like his idol, former Argentine striker Gabriel Batistuta, Cavani often celebrates scoring a goal by pretending to fire an imaginary machine gun; he has also celebrated goals by pretending to shoot a bow and arrow.

== Personal life ==
Cavani was born in Salto, Uruguay on 14 February 1987 to Luis Cavani and Berta Gómez. His elder brothers, striker Walter Guglielmone and Christian Cavani, are also professional footballers. Cavani holds an Italian passport as a result of playing in Italy and his Italian heritage; Cavani's paternal grandparents were originally from Maranello. In 1929, they migrated to Argentina and later to Montevideo. Cavani is trilingual; he is fluent in Spanish, Italian and French.

Cavani was married to Maria Soledad Cabris Yarrús, with whom he has two sons, born in 2011 and 2013. In 2013, Cavani announced that he and his wife were to get a divorce, following a split between the two the year before.

He is a devout Evangelical Christian. As a child, Cavani idolised Argentine striker Gabriel Batistuta. Cavani also enjoys ballet dancing.

== Career statistics ==
=== Club ===
As of match played 20 February 2026

Appearances and goals by club, season and competition
| Club | Season | League | | | National cup (Note: Includes Coppa Italia, Coupe de France, FA Cup, Copa del Rey, Copa Argentina) | | League cup (Note: Includes Coupe de la Ligue, EFL Cup) | | Continental | | Other | | Total | |
| Club | Season | Division | Apps | Goals | Apps | Goals | Apps | Goals | Apps | Goals | Apps | Goals | Apps | Goals |
|---|---|---|---|---|---|---|---|---|---|---|---|---|---|---|
| Danubio | 2005–06 | Uruguayan Primera División | 0 | 0 | 0 | 0 | — | | — | | — | | 0 | 0 |
| Danubio | 2006–07 | Uruguayan Primera División | 15 | 5 | 0 | 0 | — | | — | | — | | 15 | 5 |
| Danubio | Total | | 15 | 5 | 0 | 0 | — | | — | | — | | 15 | 5 |
| Palermo | 2006–07 | Serie A | 7 | 2 | — | | — | | — | | — | | 7 | 2 |
| Palermo | 2007–08 | Serie A | 33 | 5 | 2 | 0 | — | | 2 (Note: Appearances in UEFA Cup) | 0 | — | | 37 | 5 |
| Palermo | 2008–09 | Serie A | 35 | 14 | 1 | 1 | — | | — | | — | | 36 | 15 |
| Palermo | 2009–10 | Serie A | 34 | 13 | 3 | 2 | — | | — | | — | | 37 | 15 |
| Palermo | Total | | 109 | 34 | 6 | 3 | — | | 2 | 0 | — | | 117 | 37 |
| Napoli | 2010–11 | Serie A | 35 | 26 | 2 | 0 | — | | 10 (Note: Appearances in UEFA Europa League) | 7 | — | | 47 | 33 |
| Napoli | 2011–12 | Serie A | 35 | 23 | 5 | 5 | — | | 8 (Note: Appearances in UEFA Champions League) | 5 | — | | 48 | 33 |
| Napoli | 2012–13 | Serie A | 34 | 29 | 1 | 1 | — | | 7 | 7 | 1 (Note: Appearance in Supercoppa Italiana) | 1 | 43 | 38 |
| Napoli | Total | | 104 | 78 | 8 | 6 | — | | 25 | 19 | 1 | 1 | 138 | 104 |
| Paris Saint-Germain | 2013–14 | Ligue 1 | 30 | 16 | 2 | 1 | 3 | 4 | 8 | 4 | 0 | 0 | 43 | 25 |
| Paris Saint-Germain | 2014–15 | Ligue 1 | 35 | 18 | 4 | 4 | 3 | 3 | 10 | 6 | 1 (Note: Appearance in Trophée des Champions) | 0 | 53 | 31 |
| Paris Saint-Germain | 2015–16 | Ligue 1 | 32 | 19 | 5 | 2 | 4 | 1 | 10 | 2 | 1 | 1 | 52 | 25 |
| Paris Saint-Germain | 2016–17 | Ligue 1 | 36 | 35 | 3 | 2 | 3 | 4 | 8 | 8 | 0 | 0 | 50 | 49 |
| Paris Saint-Germain | 2017–18 | Ligue 1 | 32 | 28 | 5 | 3 | 2 | 2 | 8 | 7 | 1 | 0 | 48 | 40 |
| Paris Saint-Germain | 2018–19 | Ligue 1 | 21 | 18 | 3 | 2 | 2 | 1 | 7 | 2 | 0 | 0 | 33 | 23 |
| Paris Saint-Germain | 2019–20 | Ligue 1 | 14 | 4 | 2 | 2 | 2 | 0 | 3 | 1 | 1 | 0 | 22 | 7 |
| Paris Saint-Germain | Total | | 200 | 138 | 24 | 16 | 19 | 15 | 54 | 30 | 4 | 1 | 301 | 200 |
| Manchester United | 2020–21 | Premier League | 26 | 10 | 3 | 0 | 1 | 1 | 9 (Note: Four appearances in UEFA Champions League, five appearances and six goals in UEFA Europa League) | 6 | — | | 39 | 17 |
| Manchester United | 2021–22 | Premier League | 15 | 2 | 1 | 0 | 0 | 0 | 4 | 0 | — | | 20 | 2 |
| Manchester United | Total | | 41 | 12 | 4 | 0 | 1 | 1 | 13 | 6 | — | | 59 | 19 |
| Valencia | 2022–23 | La Liga | 25 | 5 | 2 | 2 | — | | — | | 1 (Note: Appearance in Supercopa de España) | 0 | 28 | 7 |
| Boca Juniors | 2023 | Argentine Primera División | 8 | 1 | 2 | 1 | — | | 6 (Note: Appearance(s) in Copa Libertadores) | 1 | — | | 16 | 3 |
| Boca Juniors | 2024 | Argentine Primera División | 29 | 11 | 4 | 4 | — | | 6 (Note: Appearances in Copa Sudamericana) | 5 | — | | 39 | 20 |
| Boca Juniors | 2025 | Argentine Primera División | 21 | 4 | 1 | 1 | — | | 1 | 0 | 1 (Note: Appearance in FIFA Club World Cup) | 0 | 24 | 5 |
| Boca Juniors | 2026 | Argentine Primera División | 2 | 0 | 0 | 0 | — | | 0 | 0 | — | | 2 | 0 |
| Boca Juniors | Total | | 60 | 16 | 7 | 6 | — | | 13 | 6 | 1 | 0 | 81 | 28 |
| Career total | | | 534 | 280 | 51 | 33 | 40 | 24 | 107 | 61 | 7 | 2 | 739 | 400 |

=== International ===
Appearances and goals by national team and year
| National team | Year | Apps | Goals |
|---|---|---|---|
| Uruguay | 2008 | 4 | 1 |
| Uruguay | 2009 | 8 | 0 |
| Uruguay | 2010 | 12 | 7 |
| Uruguay | 2011 | 12 | 2 |
| Uruguay | 2012 | 9 | 3 |
| Uruguay | 2013 | 15 | 7 |
| Uruguay | 2014 | 10 | 4 |
| Uruguay | 2015 | 8 | 4 |
| Uruguay | 2016 | 11 | 9 |
| Uruguay | 2017 | 9 | 3 |
| Uruguay | 2018 | 11 | 6 |
| Uruguay | 2019 | 7 | 4 |
| Uruguay | 2020 | 2 | 1 |
| Uruguay | 2021 | 8 | 2 |
| Uruguay | 2022 | 10 | 5 |
| Total | | 136 | 58 |

Scores and results list Uruguay's goal tally first, score column indicates score after each Cavani goal.

List of international goals scored by Edinson Cavani
| No. | Date | Venue | Cap | Opponent | Score | Result | Competition |
|---|---|---|---|---|---|---|---|
| 1 | 6 February 2008 | Estadio Centenario, Montevideo, Uruguay | 1 | Colombia | 1–2 | 2–2 | Friendly |
| 2 | 3 March 2010 | AFG Arena, St. Gallen, Switzerland | 13 | Switzerland | 3–1 | 3–1 | Friendly |
| 3 | 10 July 2010 | Nelson Mandela Bay Stadium, Port Elizabeth, South Africa | 20 | Germany | 1–1 | 2–3 | 2010 FIFA World Cup |
| 4 | 11 August 2010 | Estádio do Restelo, Lisbon, Portugal | 21 | Angola | 1–0 | 2–0 | Friendly |
| 5 | 8 October 2010 | Gelora Bung Karno Stadium, Jakarta, Indonesia | 22 | Indonesia | 1–1 | 7–1 | Friendly |
| 6 | 8 October 2010 | Gelora Bung Karno Stadium, Jakarta, Indonesia | 22 | Indonesia | 6–1 | 7–1 | Friendly |
| 7 | 8 October 2010 | Gelora Bung Karno Stadium, Jakarta, Indonesia | 22 | Indonesia | 7–1 | 7–1 | Friendly |
| 8 | 12 October 2010 | Wuhan Sports Center Stadium, Wuhan, China | 23 | China | 2–0 | 4–0 | Friendly |
| 9 | 30 March 2011 | Aviva Stadium, Dublin, Republic of Ireland | 25 | Republic of Ireland | 2–1 | 3–2 | Friendly |
| 10 | 7 October 2011 | Estadio Centenario, Montevideo, Uruguay | 33 | Bolivia | 3–1 | 4–2 | 2014 FIFA World Cup qualification |
| 11 | 29 February 2012 | Arena Națională, Bucharest, Romania | 37 | Romania | 1–0 | 1–1 | Friendly |
| 12 | 11 September 2012 | Estadio Centenario, Montevideo, Uruguay | 42 | Ecuador | 1–1 | 1–1 | 2014 FIFA World Cup qualification |
| 13 | 14 November 2012 | PGE Arena Gdańsk, Gdańsk, Poland | 45 | Poland | 2–0 | 3–1 | Friendly |
| 14 | 12 June 2013 | Polideportivo Cachamay, Puerto Ordaz, Venezuela | 50 | Venezuela | 1–0 | 1–0 | 2014 FIFA World Cup qualification |
| 15 | 26 June 2013 | Mineirão, Belo Horizonte, Brazil | 53 | Brazil | 1–1 | 1–2 | 2013 FIFA Confederations Cup |
| 16 | 30 June 2013 | Itaipava Arena Fonte Nova, Salvador, Brazil | 54 | Italy | 1–1 | 2–2 (a.e.t.) (2–3 p) | 2013 FIFA Confederations Cup |
| 17 | 30 June 2013 | Itaipava Arena Fonte Nova, Salvador, Brazil | 54 | Italy | 2–2 | 2–2 (a.e.t.) (2–3 p) | 2013 FIFA Confederations Cup |
| 18 | 10 September 2013 | Estadio Centenario, Montevideo, Uruguay | 56 | Colombia | 1–0 | 2–0 | 2014 FIFA World Cup qualification |
| 19 | 15 October 2013 | Estadio Centenario, Montevideo, Uruguay | 58 | Argentina | 3–2 | 3–2 | 2014 FIFA World Cup qualification |
| 20 | 13 November 2013 | Amman International Stadium, Amman, Jordan | 59 | Jordan | 5–0 | 5–0 | 2014 FIFA World Cup qualification |
| 21 | 4 June 2014 | Estadio Centenario, Montevideo, Uruguay | 62 | Slovenia | 1–0 | 2–0 | Friendly |
| 22 | 14 June 2014 | Estádio Castelão, Fortaleza, Brazil | 63 | Costa Rica | 1–0 | 1–3 | 2014 FIFA World Cup |
| 23 | 5 September 2014 | Sapporo Dome, Sapporo, Japan | 67 | Japan | 1–0 | 2–0 | Friendly |
| 24 | 13 November 2014 | Estadio Centenario, Montevideo, Uruguay | 69 | Costa Rica | 3–2 | 3–3 | Friendly |
| 25 | 28 March 2015 | Stade Adrar, Agadir, Morocco | 71 | Morocco | 1–0 | 1–0 | Friendly |
| 26 | 6 June 2015 | Estadio Centenario, Montevideo, Uruguay | 72 | Guatemala | 2–0 | 5–1 | Friendly |
| 27 | 6 June 2015 | Estadio Centenario, Montevideo, Uruguay | 72 | Guatemala | 3–0 | 5–1 | Friendly |
| 28 | 12 November 2015 | Estadio Olímpico Atahualpa, Quito, Ecuador | 77 | Ecuador | 1–1 | 1–2 | 2018 FIFA World Cup qualification |
| 29 | 25 March 2016 | Itaipava Arena Pernambuco, Recife, Brazil | 79 | Brazil | 1–2 | 2–2 | 2018 FIFA World Cup qualification |
| 30 | 29 March 2016 | Estadio Centenario, Montevideo, Uruguay | 80 | Peru | 1–0 | 1–0 | 2018 FIFA World Cup qualification |
| 31 | 27 May 2016 | Estadio Centenario, Montevideo, Uruguay | 81 | Trinidad and Tobago | 1–1 | 3–1 | Friendly |
| 32 | 27 May 2016 | Estadio Centenario, Montevideo, Uruguay | 81 | Trinidad and Tobago | 2–1 | 3–1 | Friendly |
| 33 | 6 September 2016 | Estadio Centenario, Montevideo, Uruguay | 86 | Paraguay | 1–0 | 4–0 | 2018 FIFA World Cup qualification |
| 34 | 6 September 2016 | Estadio Centenario, Montevideo, Uruguay | 86 | Paraguay | 4–0 | 4–0 | 2018 FIFA World Cup qualification |
| 35 | 6 October 2016 | Estadio Centenario, Montevideo, Uruguay | 87 | Venezuela | 2–0 | 3–0 | 2018 FIFA World Cup qualification |
| 36 | 6 October 2016 | Estadio Centenario, Montevideo, Uruguay | 87 | Venezuela | 3–0 | 3–0 | 2018 FIFA World Cup qualification |
| 37 | 15 November 2016 | Estadio Nacional Julio Martínez Prádanos, Santiago, Chile | 89 | Chile | 1–0 | 1–3 | 2018 FIFA World Cup qualification |
| 38 | 23 March 2017 | Estadio Centenario, Montevideo, Uruguay | 90 | Brazil | 1–0 | 1–4 | 2018 FIFA World Cup qualification |
| 39 | 10 October 2017 | Estadio Centenario, Montevideo, Uruguay | 96 | Bolivia | 2–1 | 4–2 | 2018 FIFA World Cup qualification |
| 40 | 14 November 2017 | Ernst-Happel-Stadion, Vienna, Austria | 98 | Austria | 1–1 | 1–2 | Friendly |
| 41 | 23 March 2018 | Guangxi Sports Center, Nanning, China | 99 | Czech Republic | 2–0 | 2–0 | 2018 China Cup |
| 42 | 26 March 2018 | Guangxi Sports Center, Nanning, China | 100 | Wales | 1–0 | 1–0 | 2018 China Cup |
| 43 | 25 June 2018 | Cosmos Arena, Samara, Russia | 104 | Russia | 3–0 | 3–0 | 2018 FIFA World Cup |
| 44 | 30 June 2018 | Fisht Olympic Stadium, Sochi, Russia | 105 | Portugal | 1–0 | 2–1 | 2018 FIFA World Cup |
| 45 | 30 June 2018 | Fisht Olympic Stadium, Sochi, Russia | 105 | Portugal | 2–1 | 2–1 | 2018 FIFA World Cup |
| 46 | 16 October 2018 | Saitama Stadium 2002, Saitama, Japan | 107 | Japan | 2–2 | 3–4 | Friendly |
| 47 | 16 June 2019 | Estádio Mineirão, Belo Horizonte, Brazil | 111 | Ecuador | 2–0 | 4–0 | 2019 Copa América |
| 48 | 24 June 2019 | Estádio do Maracanã, Rio de Janeiro, Brazil | 113 | Chile | 1–0 | 1–0 | 2019 Copa América |
| 49 | 15 November 2019 | Puskás Aréna, Budapest, Hungary | 115 | Hungary | 1–0 | 2–1 | Friendly |
| 50 | 18 November 2019 | Bloomfield Stadium, Tel Aviv, Israel | 116 | Argentina | 1–0 | 2–2 | Friendly |
| 51 | 13 November 2020 | Estadio Metropolitano Roberto Meléndez, Barranquilla, Colombia | 117 | Colombia | 1–0 | 3–0 | 2022 FIFA World Cup qualification |
| 52 | 24 June 2021 | Arena Pantanal, Cuiabá, Brazil | 121 | Bolivia | 2–0 | 2–0 | 2021 Copa América |
| 53 | 28 June 2021 | Estádio Olímpico Nilton Santos, Rio de Janeiro, Brazil | 122 | Paraguay | 1–0 | 1–0 | 2021 Copa América |
| 54 | 1 February 2022 | Estadio Centenario, Montevideo, Uruguay | 128 | Venezuela | 3–0 | 4–1 | 2022 FIFA World Cup qualification |
| 55 | 2 June 2022 | State Farm Stadium, Glendale, United States | 131 | Mexico | 2–0 | 3–0 | Friendly |
| 56 | 2 June 2022 | State Farm Stadium, Glendale, United States | 131 | Mexico | 3–0 | 3–0 | Friendly |
| 57 | 11 June 2022 | Estadio Centenario, Montevideo, Uruguay | 133 | Panama | 1–0 | 5–0 | Friendly |
| 58 | 11 June 2022 | Estadio Centenario, Montevideo, Uruguay | 133 | Panama | 2–0 | 5–0 | Friendly |

== Honours ==
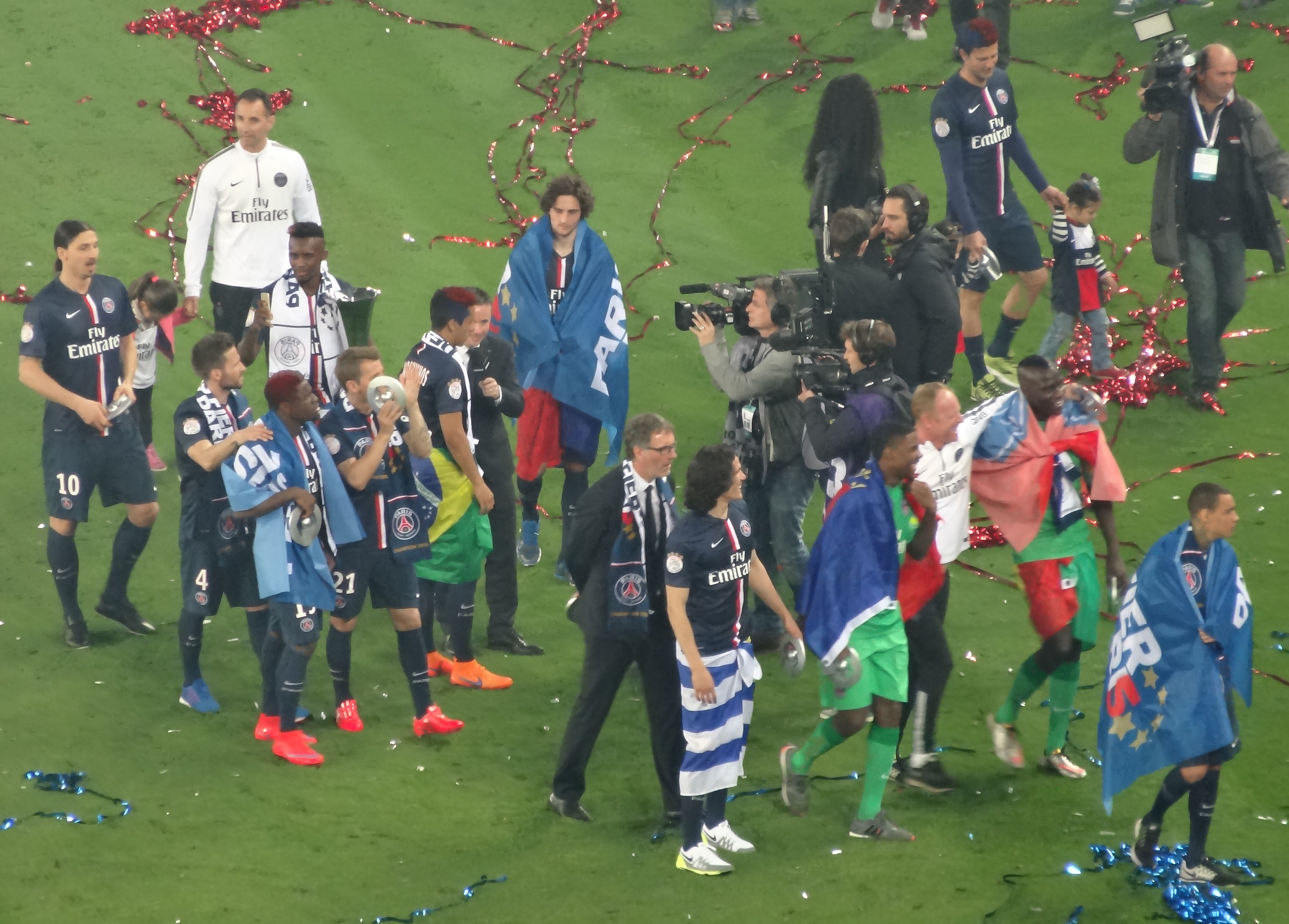
Cavani (pictured with the Uruguay flag) during PSG's 2014–15 Ligue 1 title win celebration in May 2015

Danubio

- Primera División: 2006–07

Napoli

- Coppa Italia: 2011–12

Paris Saint-Germain

- Ligue 1: 2013–14, 2014–15, 2015–16, 2017–18, 2018–19, 2019–20
- Coupe de France: 2014–15, 2015–16, 2016–17, 2017–18, 2019–20; runner-up: 2018–19
- Coupe de la Ligue: 2013–14, 2014–15, 2015–16, 2016–17, 2017–18, 2019–20
- Trophée des Champions: 2014, 2015, 2017, 2019

Manchester United

- UEFA Europa League runner-up: 2020–21

Boca Juniors

- Copa Libertadores runner-up: 2023
- Argentine Primera División: 2026

Uruguay

- Copa América: 2011

Individual

- South American Youth Championship top goalscorer: 2007 (7 goals)
- Serie A Fan Award: 2010
- Serie A Team of the Year: 2010–11, 2011–12, 2012–13
- Coppa Italia top goalscorer: 2011–12 (5 goals)
- Capocannoniere: 2012–13
- Guerin d'Oro: 2012–13
- UNFP Ligue 1 Team of the Year: 2013–14, 2016–17, 2017–18
- UNFP Ligue 1 Player of the Year: 2016–17
- Ligue 1 top goalscorer: 2016–17 (35 goals), 2017–18 (28 goals)
- Coupe de la Ligue top goalscorer: 2013–14 (four goals), 2014–15 (three goals), 2016–17 (four goals)
- Coupe de France top goalscorer: 2014–15 (four goals)
- UNFP Ligue 1 Player of the Month: September 2016, October 2016
- Trofeo EFE: 2017–18
- ESM Team of the Year: 2016–17
- CONMEBOL FIFA World Cup qualification top goalscorer: 2018 (ten goals)
- Ligue 1 Best Foreign Player: 2017
- Golden Foot: 2018
- Premier League Goal of the Month: May 2021
- UEFA Europa League Squad of the Season: 2020–21
- IFFHS Uruguayan Men's Dream Team (Team B)

== See also ==
- List of men's footballers with 100 or more international caps
- List of men's footballers with 50 or more international goals
- List of FIFA World Cup top goalscorers
