= Fabrizio Miccoli =

Italian footballer (born 1979)

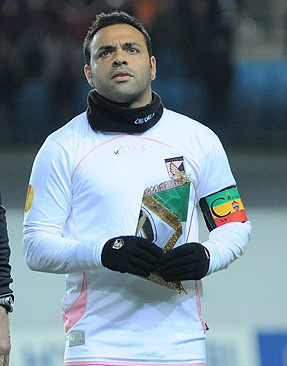
- Miccoli playing for Palermo in 2010

Personal information
- Date of birth: 27 June 1979 (age 47)
- Place of birth: Nardò, Italy
- Height: 1.68 m (5 ft 6 in)
- Position: Forward

Youth career
- 1991–1995: AC Milan
- 1995–1996: Casarano

Senior career*
Years	Team	Apps	(Gls)
1996–1998	Casarano	57	(19)
1998–2002	Ternana	120	(32)
2002–2004	Juventus	25	(8)
2002–2003	→ Perugia (loan)	34	(10)
2004–2005	Fiorentina	35	(11)
2005–2007	Juventus	0	(0)
2005–2007	→ Benfica (loan)	39	(14)
2007–2013	Palermo	165	(74)
2013–2015	Lecce	44	(17)
2015	Birkirkara	11	(6)
Total		530	(191)

International career
1996–1997	Italy U18	10	(5)
1998–2000	Italy U21	7	(2)
2003–2004	Italy	10	(2)
- * Club domestic league appearances and goals

Fabrizio Miccoli (Italian pronunciation: [faˈbrittsjo ˈmikkoli]; born on 27 June 1979) is an Italian former professional footballer who played as a forward.

He scored 103 goals in 259 matches in Serie A across nine seasons, representing Perugia, Juventus, Fiorentina and Palermo, also spending time on loan to Benfica in Portugal. He later spent two seasons with his hometown club Lecce in Lega Pro. He retired in 2015 after playing for Maltese club Birkirkara.

In a two-year international career, Miccoli scored twice in ten appearances for Italy.

== Club career ==
=== Early years ===
After playing at youth level with AC Milan, Miccoli returned to his native Puglia in 1995 to join Serie C1 team Casarano, where he made his professional debut at age 17. He then agreed for a move to Serie B side Ternana in 1998, where he scored a total 32 goals in 4 seasons, 15 of which in his final year at the club. His performances at Ternana had Miccoli dubbed the "new Del Piero" by many sections of the Italian media.

=== Juventus, Perugia and Fiorentina ===
Following his impressive performances, Juventus showed interest in signing Miccoli, and ultimately acquired his transfer rights from Ternana in July 2002, then loaning him to minor Serie A side Perugia for the 2002–03 season.

Miccoli showed great qualities during his first season in the top flight, scoring great goals and showing excellent technical ability. He was dubbed "the Romário of the Salento", "the Maradona of the Salento" and "bomber tascabile" ("pocket bomber"), due to his small stature, pace and his technical ability. His efforts helped Perugia reach an UEFA Intertoto Cup spot. For his efforts, he received an Italy call-up during the season and Juventus recalled him back for the following season.

Miccoli played six UEFA Champions League matches for Juventus, scoring one goal. He also scored seven goals in Serie A for Juventus. However, after a fallout with Juve manager Fabio Capello, he did not receive much playing time, and the next season, half of Miccoli's registration rights was sold to newly promoted Fiorentina for €7 million. Once in Florence, Miccoli showed his good qualities once again, helping Fiorentina to salvation on the last day of the season, scoring a goal to send Brescia to Serie B. At the end of the season, there was a blind auction between Fiorentina and Juventus to decide his ownership, and Juventus won it by a lump sum of approximately €6.7 million for three players (Miccoli (€2.39M), Enzo Maresca (€7,000) and Giorgio Chiellini (€4.3 million)). Therefore, Miccoli had to return to Turin, but he was sent on loan to Benfica. Juventus also had to pay agent fee of €250,000 for Miccoli's new three-year contract.

=== Benfica ===
In July 2005, Miccoli's loan to Benfica was confirmed despite initial interest from Aston Villa. Miccoli scored two goals for Benfica in six Champions League appearances. He also became a fan favourite when he scored a magnificent scissor-kick goal against Liverpool during that competition, sending Benfica to the quarter-finals. At Benfica, Miccoli attracted attention from other clubs such as Roma and Inter Milan. Miccoli opted to stay one more year in Lisbon with Benfica.

At age 35, Miccoli said Benfica was the, "most beautiful experience of his career". He had a great reputation among Benfica fans. He scored 14 goals in 39 matches for Benfica in the Primeira Liga.

=== Palermo ===
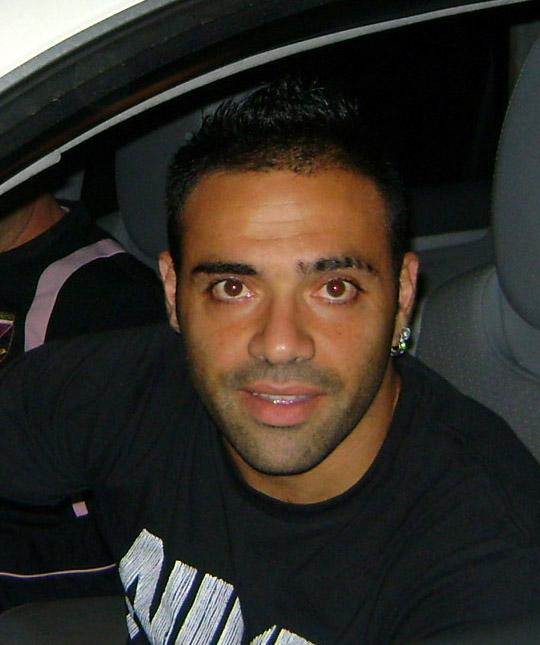
Miccoli in 2009

On 5 July 2007, Palermo announced on their official website to have signed Miccoli with a three-year agreement, costing Palermo €4.3 million. He completed a four-way swap: Miccoli replaced the departed Andrea Caracciolo, Caracciolo for Fabio Quagliarella and Vincenzo Iaquinta was replaced by Quagliarella. Miccoli returned to Italian football in the 2007–08 season and took part in the Rosanero's third UEFA Cup campaign. He scored a total eight goals in his first season with the Sicilian club, including the winning goal in the Sicilian derby against Catania, despite a number of injuries which prevented him from playing continuously in the season.

In 2008–09, Miccoli, now Palermo vice-captain (behind Fabio Liverani) following the transfers of Andrea Barzagli and Cristian Zaccardo to German club VfL Wolfsburg, enjoyed a remarkable seasonal start, especially after the appointment of Davide Ballardini as new head coach for the team, creating a prolific striking partnership with the Uruguayan Edinson Cavani, scoring 14 goals each. He renewed his contract on 30 May.

Starting in the 2009–10 season, Miccoli took the role of captain leading the team through the campaign in place of the injured Fabio Liverani, and being then confirmed after the latter rejoined the team in November 2009. During the 2009–10 season, Miccoli scored 19 goals, tying him for third in the Serie A goal-scoring race. He scored a hat-trick on 27 March 2010 against Bologna, and in a home draw against Sampdoria on 9 May 2010, Miccoli scored his 41st goal in Serie A for Palermo on a penalty which he had earned, making him the all-time Serie A leading goalscorer for Palermo. The Luciano Zauri foul that earned Miccoli the penalty against Sampdoria, though it resulted in a successfully converted penalty, also caused a moderate injury to Miccoli's knee. As a result, Miccoli underwent right knee surgery on 13 May 2010 at the Villa Stuart Clinic in Rome. The moderate damage to his cruciate ligament was deemed "successfully repaired" by knee specialist Professor Pier Paolo Mariani, and Miccoli was expected to make a full recovery over the summer months.

Miccoli's strong 2009–10 season played a big part in Palermo's campaign, which saw the club finish fifth in Serie A, tied for the best league finish in club history, and narrowly missing out on Champions League football. This also brought transfer interest from English Premier League side, Birmingham City, whom despite his injury at the time and the prospect of Miccoli missing most of the first half of the next season, still bid a reported £5 million for the 31-year-old striker.

Miccoli made a strong start to the 2011–12 Serie A season, scoring twice in a 4–3 win against Inter Milan and helping Palermo to fourth place in Serie A after five matches, recording three goals and three assists en route. In February 2011, Palermo defeated Lecce 4–2, with Miccoli, a boyhood supporter of Lecce, scoring a free-kick on the stroke of half-time. However, Miccoli refused to celebrate, being visibly upset as he left the field and was substituted during the interval.

Miccoli reached the 2011 Coppa Italia final with Palermo; however they lost out to Inter following a 3–1 defeat.

Miccoli maintained his good form despite a lacklustre season from Palermo, with three different managers serving as head coach from August to January, and on 1 February 2012, he became the top goalscorer in club history after scoring a hat-trick in a 4–4 draw against Inter Milan at the San Siro. In May 2012, he scored a hat-trick against Chievo away in a 4–4 draw. On 30 September 2012, he scored another hat-trick against Chievo in a 4–1 away win.

On 24 November, Miccoli scored his 100th Serie A goal in Palermo's 3–1 win over Catania. On 28 April 2013, on the 34th matchday of the 2012–13 Serie A season, Miccoli equalled the record for most appearances in Serie A with Palermo (161) in a 1–0 win against Inter Milan; he broke the club's appearance record in the team's following match, a 1–0 loss to Juventus on 5 May. Later in June, it was confirmed that Miccoli would not be offered a new deal, and would therefore be released by the end of his contract, set to be on 30 June 2013, ending his six-year stint in Sicily. At the end of the season, Palermo were relegated to Serie B.

After being released, Miccoli was linked with a number of clubs including Australian club Melbourne Victory. Australian media reports suggested he had made a verbal agreement to join the Victory. However, he later signed with his hometown club Lecce.

=== Lecce ===
Having been released by Palermo, Miccoli reached an agreement with Lecce and a contract was formalised 17 July 2013. He was immediately made captain of the team he supported as a child. He scored 14 goals in 27 appearances for a Lecce side which just narrowly missed out on promotion back into Serie B, reaching the final of the 2013–14 Lega Pro Prima Divisione Play-off during his first season with the club, only to be defeated by Frosinone. The following season, the club missed out on promotion yet again, finishing sixth in Group C of the Lega Pro Championship.

=== Birkirkara ===
On 24 June 2015, Miccoli reached an agreement with Maltese Premier League side Birkirara on a one-year deal. He made his Stripes debut on 2 July as a 71st-minute substitute for Edmond Agius in a goalless home draw against Ulisses in the first leg of the first qualifying round of that season's Europa League. One week later, on his first start in the return leg at the Vazgen Sargsyan Republican Stadium, he opened a 3–1 victory after the opponents' defensive error. In the second qualifying round second leg, held at the Ta' Qali National Stadium, he scored the only goal to defeat West Ham United and earn an aggregate draw, but was later substituted and Birkirkara lost in a penalty shootout.

In the league campaign, Miccoli scored 6 goals in 11 matches, including Birkirkara's first of the season on 21 August in a 4–0 home win over Naxxar Lions, and two on 4 October in a win of the same score over St. Andrews. On 16 December 2015, Miccoli announced his decision to retire from professional football.

== International career ==
Fabrizio Miccoli made ten appearances for Italy between 2003 and 2004, scoring twice. He made his debut under manager Giovanni Trapattoni in a friendly win against Portugal in Genoa on 12 February 2003, helping to create the only goal of the match for Bernardo Corradi, after the latter scored from the rebound when Miccoli's shot was saved by the keeper. On 30 March 2004, Miccoli scored directly from a corner kick in another friendly match against Portugal in Braga, which Italy won 2–1.

Miccoli featured in UEFA Euro 2004 qualifying matches and received another call-up in a friendly against Finland on 17 November 2004 in Messina, which ended in a 1–0 win, with the only goal scored by Miccoli from a free-kick; this would be his final international appearance.

After leaving Juventus on numerous loan stints, Miccoli did not receive any call ups under Marcello Lippi, missing out on the 2006 FIFA World Cup–winning squad, and was not called up to the Azzurri under either Roberto Donadoni nor Cesare Prandelli. Many sections of the Italian media attribute Miccoli's exclusion from the Italy national side under Lippi due to Miccoli's role in court during the 2006 Italian football scandal ("Calciopoli") in which Miccoli testified against Juventus, a club with close relations to Lippi. Notwithstanding, Lippi still spoke positively in the media about Miccoli, referring to him in 2005: "I am constantly keeping him under observation, He's a big quality player and technically he is really good. He is a genius. Miccoli is a forward that can be really important for all teams in which he plays."

During the 2009–10 Serie A season, there were several calls and speculation within the Italian media and high football figures that Miccoli could make a return to the Azzurri for the 2010 FIFA World Cup, and expressed continued interest in playing for the national team. However, Miccoli was not selected by Lippi for the World Cup and in March 2011, upon return from a serious knee injury, he effectively announced his intentions not to pursue an international career any further.

== Style of play ==
Usually deployed as a creative second striker, Miccoli was well known throughout his career for his all-round attacking and creative abilities, specifically his technique, pace and his powerful and accurate finishing, both inside and outside the area with either foot. While being a prolific goalscorer, Miccoli was also a regular assist provider. Due to his acceleration, balance, agility, and his technical skills, Miccoli was also capable of playing in a playmaking role, as an attacking midfielder on occasion, a position which allowed him to undertake individual dribbling runs during counterattacks and create chances for teammates. Throughout his career, he was also deployed as a winger, where he demonstrated his ability to beat opposing players in one-on-one situations courtesy of his ball skills and close control, and subsequently cut in onto his right foot to curl shots on goal from the left flank. Miccoli was also an accurate set piece and penalty taker. He frequently used the "Panenka" gesture when taking penalties during his playing career, and also often employed a "stutter feint" when taking them, where he would slow down during his run-up and fake a shot before finally kicking the ball.

Considered to be a promising player in his youth, due to his small stature, physique, pace, talent, goalscoring, and technical ability, he was dubbed the "Romário of the Salento" in the media; he was also nicknamed, "Lu Maradona," "Il Pibe de Nardò" (a reference to his hometown, as well as Diego Maradona's nickname "El Pibe de Oro," or "The Golden Kid"), and "the Maradona of the Salento," with the latter player being Miccoli's idol. His diminutive stature and eye for goal also earned him the nickname "bomber tascabile" ("pocket bomber"), while during his time at Ternana, his playing style was also compared to that of Juventus forward Alessandro Del Piero, prior to Miccoli's move to the Turin–based side, with whom he competed for a starting spot. He was also praised for his leadership qualities as Palermo's captain. Despite his talent, he has been accused of not living up to his potential in the media, in part due to his unorthodox character, his controversial life off the pitch, and his struggles with injuries; as such, he had more success with smaller clubs rather than larger ones.

== Post-playing career ==
After retirement, Miccoli kept working on his youth football team in his native Salento, originally founded in 2012.

On 30 December 2020, he was announced as the new assistant coach of Francesco Moriero at Albanian club Dinamo Tirana; he was also named in charge of the club's youth sector. On 2 March 2021, both Moriero and Miccoli resigned from their coaching roles at the club, after having been in charge of only two league games for the Albanian club.

In July 2021 he accepted an offer from Triestina to become the club's under-19 chief youth coach, but resigned from his post only nine days later.

== Personal life ==
Miccoli is married to Flaviana, a woman he met first when he was 17 and she was 14. Together they have a daughter, Suami, who was born in March 2003. His second child, a son named Diego – after Diego Maradona –, was born in June 2008.

In early 2010, Miccoli made national news after he purchased an earring belonging to his childhood hero Diego Maradona. The earring had been confiscated by the national tax office during a visit by Maradona to Italy (the Argentine star owing several million euros in taxes to the Italian state). It was sold at a public auction for €25,000. After confirming the purchase, Miccoli revealed he would return the earring to Maradona if he were to meet him. Like his idol Maradona, Miccoli has a tattoo of Che Guevera, on his right leg.

Miccoli is a supporter of Lecce and, before joining them in 2013, had previously expressed an interest in playing for the club in the future.

== Controversy ==
On 22 June 2013, the Italian press agency ANSA reported that the office of public prosecution in Palermo had started investigations against Miccoli for extortion in connection with allegations he commissioned Mauro Lauricella, the son of Sicilian mafioso Antonino Lauricella, to collect money owed to him by a nightclub. Additionally, Miccoli was quoted in wiretaps of taped telephone conversations, published in the newspaper La Repubblica, as referring to the assassinated anti-mafia judge Giovanni Falcone as "fango", or "filth" in English. Subsequently, during the 2013–14 season, the FIGC Federal Prosecutor's Office asked for a disqualification day and a fine of €50,000, but on 27 February 2014, he was acquitted by the Federcalcio Disciplinary Committee.

On 20 April 2015, Miccoli was investigated on charges of aggravated extortion because of constant contact with Lauricella to recover €12,000 from a physiotherapist friend at the disco "il Paparazzi" in Isola delle Femmine.

On 21 October 2017, Miccoli was sentenced by the Court of Palermo to three years and six months imprisonment, with abbreviated procedure, for extortion aggravated by Mafia method. His sentence was confirmed in an appeal in January 2020. On 23 November 2021, Miccoli had his appeal rejected by the Supreme Court, and the sentence upheld. On the following day, he turned himself in to the police of the prison of Rovigo. He was released in May 2022, after accepting to do community services for the remainder of his sentence.

== Career statistics ==
=== Club ===
Appearances and goals by club, season and competition
Club	Season	League			Cup		Continental		Other		Total	
Club	Season	Division	Apps	Goals	Apps	Goals	Apps	Goals	Apps	Goals	Apps	Goals
Casarano	1996–97	Serie D	27	8	2	0	—		—		29	8
Casarano	1997–98	Serie D	30	11	—		—		—		30	11
Casarano	Total		57	19	0	0	0	0	0	0	59	19
Ternana	1998–99	Serie B	30	1	2	0	—		—		32	1
Ternana	1999–2000	Serie B	33	9	7	0	—		—		40	9
Ternana	2000–01	Serie B	23	7	2	0	—		—		25	7
Ternana	2001–02	Serie B	34	15	4	3	—		—		38	18
Ternana	Total		120	32	15	3	0	0	0	0	135	35
Perugia (loan)	2002–03	Serie A	34	9	6	5	2	2	—		42	16
Juventus	2003–04	Serie A	25	8	6	1	6	1	1	0	38	10
Juventus	2004–05	Serie A	0	0	1	0	0	0	—		1	0
Juventus	Total		25	8	7	1	6	1	0	0	39	10
Fiorentina	2004–05	Serie A	35	12	4	0	—		—		39	12
Benfica (loan)	2005–06	Primeira Liga	17	4	0	0	6	2	—		23	6
Benfica (loan)	2006–07	Primeira Liga	22	10	0	0	11	3	—		33	13
Benfica (loan)	Total		39	14	0	0	17	5	0	0	56	19
Palermo	2007–08	Serie A	22	8	0	0	0	0	—		22	8
Palermo	2008–09	Serie A	30	14	1	0	—		—		31	14
Palermo	2009–10	Serie A	35	19	3	3	—		—		38	22
Palermo	2010–11	Serie A	21	9	4	1	3	0	—		28	10
Palermo	2011–12	Serie A	28	16	0	0	2	1	—		30	17
Palermo	2012–13	Serie A	29	8	1	2	0	0	—		30	10
Palermo	Total		165	74	9	6	5	1	0	0	179	81
Lecce	2013–14	Lega Pro Prima Divisione	27	14	4	0	—	—	—		31	14
Lecce	2014–15	Lega Pro Prima Divisione	17	3	2	2	—		—		19	5
Lecce	Total		44	17	6	2	0	0	0	0	48	19
Birkirkara	2015–16	Maltese Premier League	11	6	—		4	2	1	1	16	9
Career total			530	191	49	17	34	11	2	1	615	220

=== International ===
As of match played 17 November 2004

Italy
Year	Apps	Goals
2003	5	0
2004	5	2
Total	10	2

#	Date	Venue	Opponent	Score	Result	Competition
1.	31 March 2004	Estádio Municipal de Braga, Braga, Portugal	Portugal	1–2	1–2	Friendly
2.	17 November 2004	Stadio San Filippo, Messina, Italy	Finland	1–0	1–0	Friendly

== Honours ==
Juventus

- Supercoppa Italiana: 2003
- Coppa Italia runner-up: 2003–04

Palermo

- Coppa Italia runner-up: 2010–11

Birkirkara

- Maltese Super Cup runner-up: 2015

Individual

- Coppa Italia top scorer: 2002–03 (5 goals)
