= Paolo Carbonaro =

Italian footballer

Personal information
- Date of birth: 16 February 1989 (age 37)
- Place of birth: Palermo, Italy
- Height: 1.78 m (5 ft 10 in)
- Positions: Left winger; forward

Team information
- Current team: Marsala
- Number: 7

Youth career
- –2008: Palermo

Senior career*
Years	Team	Apps	(Gls)
2008–2011	Palermo	1	(0)
2008–2009	→ Monopoli (loan)	30	(3)
2009–2010	→ Giulianova (loan)	28	(4)
2010–2011	→ Barletta (loan)	14	(0)
2011	→ Gela (loan)	5	(0)
2011–2012	Giulianova	26	(5)
2012–2013	Catanzaro	3	(0)
2013	HinterReggio	12	(7)
2013–2014	Vigor Lamezia	12	(1)
2014–2015	Aversa Normanna	11	(1)
2015	Monza	8	(0)
2015–2016	Venezia	33	(12)
2016–2017	Altovicentino	24	(7)
2017–2019	Folgore Caratese	44	(8)
2019–2021	FC Messina	45	(17)
2021–2022	Cavese	24	(1)
2022	Acireale	9	(4)
2022–2023	Trapani	15	(2)
2023	Lamezia	4	(0)
2023–2025	Manfredonia	53	(11)
2025–2026	Ars et Labor		
2026–	Marsala		

International career
2006	Italy U18	1	(0)
2007–2008	Italy U19	6	(1)
2010	Italy U20	2	(2)
- * Club domestic league appearances and goals as of 4 October 2026

Paolo Carbonaro (born 16 February 1989) is an Italian footballer who plays as a forward for Marsala.

== Club career ==
Born in Palermo, Carbonaro is a product of Palermo's youth system. He made his Serie A debut on 18 May 2008, substituting Boško Janković in the 79th minute in the rosanero's final 2007–08 league game against Siena. Both team failed to score more goal afterward and ended as a 2–2 draw.

He was loaned at Lega Pro Seconda Divisione club Monopoli on 1 September 2008. On 18 July 2009, he was loaned to Giulianova.

=== Barletta and Gela ===
On 30 July 2010, he was loaned to Barletta. Originally one of the starting striker in a 4–3–3 formation, he found himself out of the starting lineup after Arcangelo Sciannimanico chose to bet on experienced central forward Massimo Margiotta instead.

On 31 January 2011, Palermo announced Carbonaro would complete the 2010–11 season with Sicilian Lega Pro Prima Divisione club Gela.

In the summer 2011 he moved permanently to Giulianova. He started the 2012–13 season with Catanzaro, and then joined Lega Pro Seconda Divisione club HinterReggio during the January 2013 transfer window, being unable to save his team from relegation to Serie D. He stayed in the Seconda Divisione for the 2013–14 season, playing with Vigor Lamezia and Cosenza respectively. In August 2014 he joined Aversa Normanna of Lega Pro.

=== Serie D ===
In July 2019 he signed for Serie D club FC Messina. In June 2020, he extended for one more season his contract with the Sicilians.

On 3 August 2021 he moved to Cavese. He successively joined Acireale for the first half of the 2022–23 Serie D season, then leaving for Trapani later in December 2022.

== International career ==
Carbonaro was also briefly part of the Italian under-19 and under-20 national teams.
