= 2007–08 US Città di Palermo season =

U.S. Città di Palermo
2007–08 season
- Chairman: Maurizio Zamparini
- Manager: Stefano Colantuono (Days 1–13); Francesco Guidolin (Days 14–30); Stefano Colantuono (From Day 31)
- Serie A: 11th
- UEFA Cup: 1st Round (eliminated)
- Coppa Italia: Round of 16 (eliminated)
- Top goalscorer: League: Amauri (15); All: Amauri (15)
- Highest home attendance: 34,271 vs Juventus, April 6, 2008
- Lowest home attendance: 21,829 vs Cagliari, February 17, 2008

U.S. Città di Palermo is playing the season 2007–08 in the Serie A, being the fourth season in a row for Palermo in the league since their return in 2004.

== Review and events ==
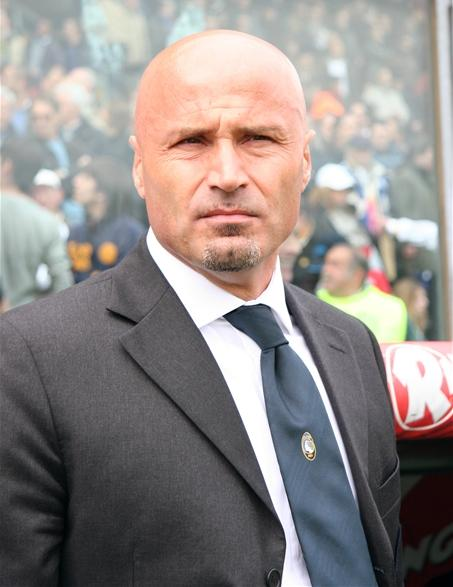
Stefano Colantuono, original Palermo head coach for 2007-08

Following a hard season ended in fifth place, Francesco Guidolin, sacked and successively recalled during the final days of the 2006–07 season, was not confirmed as Palermo head coach. On 31 May 2007, Atalanta boss Stefano Colantuono was announced to fill the vacant managing position.

Regarding the team players, Giovanni Tedesco announced, immediately following the final 2006–07 matchday, to have agreed for a one-year contract extension. The first two signings for the new season, midfielder Giulio Migliaccio from Atalanta and goalkeeper Samir Ujkani from Anderlecht, were announced on 8 June. On the same day, Palermo captain Eugenio Corini announced his intention not to renew his contract with the rosanero, which due to expire on 30 June, following a dispute with club management. The 22 June deadline for the resolution of co-ownership brought the return of Davide Matteini from Empoli, whereas Stephen Makinwa, previously in co-ownership between Palermo and Lazio, was ultimately acquired by the biancazzurri. That same day, Andrea Caracciolo was announced to have been sold to Sampdoria in a co-ownership bid, whereas Mariano González, back from a season loan to Internazionale, was loaned out once again, this time to Porto. On 28 June, the club unveiled the signing of Serbian international Boško Janković from Mallorca. On 5 July, two moves were made by Palermo, with David Di Michele being sold to Torino and Fabrizio Miccoli signing from Juventus.

Palermo's pre-season phase begun on 12 July, when all the players gathered in Udine and then moved to the training camp of Bad Kleinkirchheim, Austria, where the team stayed until 4 August. From 6 to 12 August, the team successively moved to Villach, and then returned to Palermo in a training session at Stadio Renzo Barbera in front of 10,000 spectators. They made their Serie A debut on 26 August, a 2–0 home loss to Roma, and achieved their first seasonal win in the next matchday, a 4–2 away win at Livorno. The season ticket sale closed on 11 September with 19,992 tickets being altogether sold.

Palermo started their UEFA Cup campaign, their third consecutive, challenging Czech side Mladá Boleslav in the first round. The first leg, played at Mlada's home venue, ended in a 1–0 win for the rosanero thanks to a late winner goal by Boško Janković. This was followed by two Serie A consecutive wins, a 1–0 away victory at Cagliari and a last-minute 2–1 triumph against Milan, with Miccoli scoring a late winning goal during injury time.

However, in the return leg of the UEFA Cup first round, Palermo lost 1–0 at home, with a Mladá goal scored during injury time, and were defeated in the subsequent penalty shootouts, causing an unexpected elimination. In October, Palermo managed just to achieve four ties out of four matches, causing the team to slide down to ninth place, six points behind the fourth UEFA Champions League spot; increasing fans disappointment for these poor results led them to whistle and jeer the players during their October 31 home match, a home match with Parma ended in a 1–1 tie thanks to a late penalty equaliser scored by Amauri. In the aftermath of the match, Palermo captain Andrea Barzagli heavily criticized the fans for what he felt to be a hostile reception. They returned to win on 10 November in a 2–1 home win to Napoli, after five consecutive ties. A crushing 5–0 away loss at Juventus on 25 November however persuaded club chairman Zamparini to sack Colantuono the next day and reappoint Guidolin at the helm of the rosanero. Guidolin marked his debut on 2 December, losing the Sicilian derby 3–1 in Catania. This was followed by two consecutive wins to Fiorentina and Atalanta and a home tie with Lazio, which allowed the rosanero to end the 2007 solar year in sixth place, four points shy of the fourth Champions League spot. Still in December, Palermo made their Coppa Italia seasonal debut with a 0–0 draw against Udinese at Stadio Friuli. They were however later defeated at home, and thus eliminated from the competition, by the bianconeri on the return leg, with a goal by Antonio Floro Flores scored during injury time.

During the January transfer market, Palermo loaned out Franco Brienza, the only player to have been a rosanero in all the top three Italian tiers, to Reggina. They successively sold Marco Pisano (on loan) and Aimo Diana (permanent transfer) to Torino, and signed full back Federico Balzaretti from Fiorentina and youngsters Luca Di Matteo and Edgar Çani from Pescara. The rosanero ended the first Serie A half in eighth place, after two consecutive league defeats to Sampdoria and Siena (the latter at home), and notably with the second-worst defensive line in terms of goals allowed. Palermo ended their negative row of results of four consecutive defeats (including Coppa Italia matches) with a 1–0 home win to Livorno on 2 February. However, a disappointing row in March, with two points in four matches, and Palermo down to eleventh place, causing Zamparini to attack Guidolin for the poor performances of his team. This was followed by a third consecutive defeat, a disappointing 3–2 home loss to Genoa, and subsequent criticism by Guidolin who attacked Palermo fans declaring "it's like playing in hell here". These remarks were immediately criticized by the club management, who consequently declared they might reconsider Guidolin's position as head coach in the near future. On March 24 Palermo announced to have sacked Guidolin and reappointed Colantuono at the helm of the rosanero. In the debut match for his second tenure, Palermo lost 1–0 to Napoli, suffering the match's lone goal during injury time, but managed to defeat 3–2 third-placed Juventus the following week thanks to a late goal by full back Mattia Cassani, and then winning the Sicilian derby the following week thanks to a free kick by Fabrizio Miccoli.

Palermo ended the league in 11th place, their worst result since the rosanero's return to the top-flight in 2004.

== Match results ==
=== Serie A ===
Pos	Team	Pld	W	D	L	GF	GA	GD	Pts
9	Atalanta	38	12	12	14	52	56	−4	48 (Note: Atalanta finished ahead of Genoa on head-to-head points: Genoa 2-1 Atalanta, Atalanta 2-0 Genoa.)
10	Genoa	38	13	9	16	44	52	−8	48
11	Palermo	38	12	11	15	47	57	−10	47
12	Lazio	38	11	13	14	47	51	−4	46
13	Siena	38	9	17	12	40	45	−5	44

Source: Serie A
Rules for classification: 1) points; 2) head-to-head points; 3) head-to-head goal difference; 4) head-to-head goals scored; 5) goal difference; 6) number of goals scored.
Notes:

Legend
Win	Draw	Loss

Date	Opponent	Venue	Result	Scorers	Attendance	Position	Report
August 26, 2007 – 20:30	AS Roma	Home	Lost 0–2		32,202	16	(Report)
September 2, 2007 – 15:00	Livorno	Away	Won 4–2	Rinaudo, Miccoli (2), Amauri	8,475	10	(Report)
September 16, 2007 – 15:00	Torino	Home	Drew 1–1	Simplício	25,987	9	(Report)
September 23, 2007 – 15:00	Cagliari	Away	Won 1–0	Zaccardo	10,000	7	(Report)
September 26, 2007 – 20:30	AC Milan	Home	Won 2–1	Diana, Miccoli	30,761	5	(Report)
September 30, 2007 – 15:00	Empoli	Away	Lost 1–3	Cavani	6,002	6	(Report)
October 7, 2007 – 15:00	Reggina	Home	Drew 1–1	Amauri	22,845	6	(Report)
October 21, 2007 – 15:00	Udinese	Away	Drew 1–1	Amauri	13,404	5	(Report)
October 28, 2007 – 15:00	Internazionale	Home	Drew 0–0		33,972	9	(Report)
October 31, 2007 – 20:30	Parma	Home	Drew 1–1	Amauri	22,680	9	(Report)
November 4, 2007 – 15:00	Genoa	Away	Drew 3–3	Cavani, Brienza, Amauri	23,595	8	(Report)
November 10, 2007 – 20:30	Napoli	Home	Won 2–1	Tedesco (2)	25,138	7	(Report)
November 25, 2007 – 20:30	Juventus	Away	Lost 0–5		20,036	8	(Report)
December 2, 2007 – 15:00	Catania	Away	Lost 1–3	Caserta	17,400	11	(Report)
December 8, 2007 – 20:30	Fiorentina	Home	Won 2–0	Miccoli, Simplício	22,823	8	(Report)
December 16, 2007 – 15:00	Atalanta	Away	Won 3–1	Cavani, Langella (own goal), Amauri	5,452	6	(Report)
December 23, 2007 – 15:00	Lazio	Home	Drew 2–2	Simplício, Amauri	24,148	6	(Report)
January 13, 2008 – 15:00	Sampdoria	Away	Lost 0–3		19,574	6	(Report)
January 20, 2008 – 15:00	Siena	Home	Lost 2–3	Amauri, Miccoli	22,542	8	(Report)
January 26, 2008 – 20:30	AS Roma	Away	Lost 0–1		32,618	9	(Report)
February 2, 2008 – 18:00	Livorno	Home	Won 1–0	Miccoli	23,033	9	(Report)
February 10, 2008 – 15:00	Torino	Away	Lost 1–3	Amauri	17,914	10	(Report)
February 17, 2008 – 15:00	Cagliari	Home	Won 2–1	Cavani, Janković	21,829	8	(Report)
February 24, 2008 – 20:30	AC Milan	Away	Lost 1–2	Bresciano	50,643	10	(Report)
February 27, 2008 – 20:30	Empoli	Home	Won 2–0	Simplício, Rinaudo	22,897	10	(Report)
March 2, 2008 – 15:00	Reggina	Away	Drew 0–0		10,316	9	(Report)
March 8, 2008 – 20:30	Udinese	Home	Drew 1–1	Simplício	24,833	8	(Report)
March 16, 2008 – 15:00	Internazionale	Away	Lost 1–2	Materazzi (own goal)	49,360	9	(Report)
March 19, 2008 – 20:30	Parma	Away	Lost 1–2	Cavani	12,599	11	(Report)
March 22, 2008 – 15:00	Genoa	Home	Lost 2–3	Amauri (2)	23,260	12	(Report)
March 30, 2008 – 20:30	Napoli	Away	Lost 0–1		49,341	13	(Report)
April 6, 2008 – 20:30	Juventus	Home	Won 3–2	Amauri (2), Cassani	34,271	12	(Report)
April 12, 2008 – 18:00	Catania	Home	Won 1–0	Miccoli	24,847	10	(Report)
April 19, 2008 – 20:30	Fiorentina	Away	Lost 0–1		28,827	10	(Report)
April 27, 2008 – 15:00	Atalanta	Home	Drew 0–0		23,288	10	(Report)
May 4, 2008 – 15:00	Lazio	Away	Won 2–1	Amauri (2)	20,786	10	(Report)
May 11, 2008 – 15:00	Sampdoria	Home	Lost 0–2		23,929	11	(Report)
May 18, 2008 – 15:00	Siena	Away	Drew 2–2	Janković, Miccoli	9,339	11	(Report)

=== UEFA Cup ===
Date	Round	Opponent	Venue	Result	Scorers	Attendance	Report
September 20, 2007 – 18:15	1st Round – 1st Leg	(Czech Republic) Mladá Boleslav	Away	Won 1–0	Janković	4,110	(Report)
October 4, 2007 – 20:45	1st Round – 2nd Leg	(Czech Republic) Mladá Boleslav	Home	Lost 0–1 (2–4p)		6,335	(Report)

=== Coppa Italia ===
Date	Round	Opponent	Venue	Result	Scorers	Attendance	Report
December 19, 2007 – 15:30	Round of 16 – 1st Leg	Udinese	Away	Drew 0–0		1,695	(Report)
January 16, 2008 – 15:00	Round of 16 – 2nd Leg	Udinese	Home	Lost 0–1		12,516	(Report)

== Player details ==
Final statistics

No.	Pos	Nat	Player	Total		Serie A		UEFA Cup		Coppa Italia	
No.	Pos	Nat	Player	Apps	Goals	Apps	Goals	Apps	Goals	Apps	Goals
1	GK	(Italy) ITA	Federico Agliardi	14	-18	10	-16	2	-1	2	-1
12	GK	(Italy) ITA	Alberto Fontana	30	-41	30	-41	0	0	0	0
88	GK	(Kosovo) KOS	Samir Ujkani	0	0	0	0	0	0	0	0
2	DF	(Italy) ITA	Cristian Zaccardo	38	1	35	1	1	0	2	0
3	DF	(Italy) ITA	Ciro Capuano	14	0	12	0	1	0	1	0
16	DF	(Italy) ITA	Mattia Cassani	29	1	26	1	1	0	2	0
21	DF	(Italy) ITA	Giuseppe Biava	24	0	24	0	0	0	0	0
42	DF	(Italy) ITA	Federico Balzaretti	16	0	16	0	0	0	0	0
43	DF	(Italy) ITA	Andrea Barzagli (captain)	36	0	34	0	2	0	0	0
53	DF	(Italy) ITA	Alberto Cossentino	1	0	1	0	0	0	0	0
77	DF	(Italy) ITA	Leandro Rinaudo	26	2	22	2	2	0	2	0
4	MF	(Italy) ITA	Giovanni Tedesco	21	2	17	2	2	0	2	0
8	MF	(Italy) ITA	Giulio Migliaccio	34	0	31	0	2	0	1	0
14	MF	(Italy) ITA	Roberto Guana	33	0	32	0	0	0	1	0
17	MF	(Serbia) SRB	Boško Janković	30	3	26	2	2	1	2	0
20	MF	(Italy) ITA	Fabio Caserta	31	1	27	1	2	0	2	0
22	MF	(Italy) ITA	Luca Di Matteo	1	0	1	0	0	0	0	0
23	MF	(Australia) AUS	Mark Bresciano	30	1	26	1	2	0	2	0
30	MF	(Brazil) BRA	Fábio Simplício	36	5	32	5	2	0	2	0
7	FW	(Uruguay) URU	Edinson Cavani	37	5	33	5	2	0	2	0
9	FW	(Albania) ALB	Edgar Çani	1	0	1	0	0	0	0	0
10	FW	(Italy) ITA	Fabrizio Miccoli	22	8	22	8	0	0	0	0
11	FW	(Italy) ITA	Amauri	38	15	34	15	2	0	2	0
18	FW	(Italy) ITA	Paolo Carbonaro	1	0	1	0	0	0	0	0
Players sold or loaned out during the January transfer market:
19	FW	(Italy) ITA	Franco Brienza	9	1	8	1	1	0	0	0
26	DF	(Italy) ITA	Marco Pisano	7	0	6	0	0	0	1	0
32	MF	(Italy) ITA	Aimo Diana	18	1	15	1	2	0	1	0
67	MF	(Italy) ITA	Francesco Mirko Velardi	0	0	0	0	0	0	0	0

=== January transfer market bids ===
In

42	DF	ITA	Federico Balzaretti (from Fiorentina)
9	FW	ALB	Edgar Çani (from Pescara)
22	MF	ITA	Luca Di Matteo (from Pescara)

Out

19	FW	ITA	Franco Brienza (loaned to Reggina)
32	MF	ITA	Aimo Diana (to Torino)
26	DF	ITA	Marco Pisano (loaned to Torino)
67	MF	ITA	Francesco Mirko Velardi (loaned to Pescara)

== See also ==
- 2007–08 in Italian football
