= 2003–04 AC ChievoVerona season =

Chievo
2003–04 season
- Chairman: Luca Campedelli
- Manager: Luigi Delneri
- Serie A: 9th
- Coppa Italia: Round of 16
- Top goalscorer: Federico Cossato (6)
- Highest home attendance: 34,634 vs Juventus
- Lowest home attendance: 9,043 vs Ancona
- Average home league attendance: 14,868

A.C. ChievoVerona played its third consecutive season in Serie A, and nearly equaled 7th place from the 2002-03 Serie A season. The club finished 9th in Serie A and was eliminated by Perugia in the round of 16 of Coppa Italia.

== Competitions ==
=== Serie A ===
| Pos | Team | Pld | W | D | L | GF | GA | GD | Pts | Qualification or relegation |
|---|---|---|---|---|---|---|---|---|---|---|
| 7 | Udinese (Note: Udinese gained entry to the 2004–05 UEFA Cup as Coppa Italia because both finalists Lazio and Juventus qualified for the 2004–05 UEFA Cup and the 2004–05 UEFA Champions League through league position, respectively.) | 34 | 13 | 11 | 10 | 44 | 40 | +4 | 50 | Qualification to UEFA Cup first round |
| 8 | Sampdoria | 34 | 11 | 13 | 10 | 40 | 42 | −2 | 46 | |
| 9 | Chievo | 34 | 11 | 11 | 12 | 36 | 37 | −1 | 44 | |
| 10 | Lecce | 34 | 11 | 8 | 15 | 43 | 56 | −13 | 41 | |
| 11 | Brescia | 34 | 9 | 13 | 12 | 52 | 57 | −5 | 40 | |

Source: Almanacco Illustrato del Calcio – La Storia 1898-2004, Panini Edizioni, Modena, September 2005
Rules for classification: 1) points; 2) tiebreaker for relevant positions 3) head-to-head points and goal difference; 4) head-to-head goals scored; 5) goal difference; 6) number of goals scored.
