= 2004–05 AC ChievoVerona season =

Chievo
2004–05 season
- Chairman: Luca Campedelli
- Manager: Mario Beretta, from the 36th day Maurizio D'Angelo
- Serie A: 15th
- Coppa Italia: First round
- Top goalscorer: Sergio Pellissier (7)
- Highest home attendance: 29,450 vs Inter
- Lowest home attendance: 6,745 vs Livorno
- Average home league attendance: 12,103

A.C. ChievoVerona played its fourth consecutive season in Serie A, and nearly equaled 7th place from the 2002-03 Serie A season. The club finished 15th in Serie A, escaping relegation by just one point.

== Competitions ==
=== Serie A ===
Pos	Team	Pld	W	D	L	GF	GA	GD	Pts	Qualification or relegation
13	Lazio (Note: Lazio gained entry to the 2005 UEFA Intertoto Cup after Messina and Livorno renounced.)	38	11	11	16	48	53	−5	44	Qualification to Intertoto Cup third round
14	Siena	38	9	16	13	44	55	−11	43	
15	Chievo	38	11	10	17	32	49	−17	43	
16	Fiorentina	38	9	15	14	42	50	−8	42	
17	Parma	38	10	12	16	48	65	−17	42	Relegation tie-breaker

Source: 2004–05 Serie A, RSSSF.com, Soccerway
Rules for classification: 1) Points; 2) Head-to-head points; 3) Head-to-head goal difference; 4) Goal difference; 5) Goals scored; 6) Draw. (Note: Head-to-head record is used only after all the matches between the teams in question have been played).
