= 2000 Torneo di Viareggio =

2000 Torneo Mondiale di Calcio Coppa Carnevale
52° Torneo di Viareggio

Tournament details
- Host country: Italy
- City: Viareggio
- Dates: February 22, 2000 - March 6, 2000
- Teams: 40

Final positions
- Champions: (Italy) Empoli
- Runners-up: (Italy) Fiorentina
- Third place: (Brazil) Campinas
- Fourth place: (Italy) Inter Milan

Tournament statistics
- Matches played: 76
- Goals scored: 210 (2.76 per match)

The 2000 winners of the Torneo di Viareggio (in English, the Viareggio Tournament, officially the Viareggio Cup World Football Tournament Coppa Carnevale), the annual youth football tournament held in Viareggio, Tuscany, are listed below.

== Format ==
The 40 teams are seeded in 10 pools, split up into 5-pool groups. Each team from a pool meets the others in a single tie. The winning club from each pool and three best runners-up from both group A and group B progress to the final knockout stage. All matches in the final rounds are single tie. The Round of 16 envisions penalties and no extra time, while the rest of the final round matches include 30 minutes extra time with Golden goal rule and penalties to be played if the draw between teams still holds. Semifinal losing teams play 3rd-place final with penalties after regular time. The winning sides play the final with extra time, no Golden goal rule and repeat the match if the draw holds.

== Participating teams ==
Italian teams

- (Italy) Atalanta
- (Italy) Bari
- (Italy) Brescia
- (Italy) Empoli
- (Italy) Fiorentina
- (Italy) Genoa
- (Italy) Inter Milan
- (Italy) Juventus
- (Italy) Lazio
- (Italy) Livorno
- (Italy) Milan
- (Italy) Napoli
- (Italy) Parma
- (Italy) Perugia
- (Italy) Pistoiese
- (Italy) Pontedera
- (Italy) Roma
- (Italy) Salernitana
- (Italy) Siena
- (Italy) Torino
- (Italy) Verona
- (Italy) Vicenza

European teams

- (Switzerland) Bellinzona
- (Switzerland) Lugano
- (Croatia) Hajduk
- (Denmark) AB

African teams

- (South Africa) Jomo Cosmos
- (Nigeria) Udoji United

Asian teams

- (Israel) Maccabi Haifa

American teams

- (Mexico) Pumas
- (United States) Commack United NY
- (Brazil) Corinthians
- (Brazil) Vitória
- (Brazil) Campinas
- (Brazil) Santa Catarina
- (Brazil) Irineu
- (Brazil) Linense
- (Brazil) São Bento
- (Brazil) Matsubara

Oceanian teams

- (Australia) Marconi Stallions

== Group stage ==
=== Group 1 ===
Team	Pts	Pld	W	D	L	GF	GA	GD
(Italy) Lazio	7	3	2	1	0	4	0	+4
(Brazil) Corinthians	5	3	1	2	0	5	2	+3
(Italy) Milan	4	3	1	1	1	2	3	-1
(Israel) Maccabi Haifa	0	3	0	0	3	1	7	-6

=== Group 2 ===
Team	Pts	Pld	W	D	L	GF	GA	GD
(Italy) Brescia	7	3	2	1	0	3	1	+2
(Croatia) Hajduk	5	3	1	2	0	4	3	+1
(Switzerland) Bellinzona	3	3	1	0	2	2	3	-1
(Italy) Torino	1	3	0	1	2	3	5	-2

=== Group 3 ===
Team	Pts	Pld	W	D	L	GF	GA	GD
(Italy) Bari	7	3	2	1	0	4	0	+4
(Italy) Empoli	6	3	2	0	1	6	4	+2
(Brazil) Santa Catarina	2	3	1	1	1	6	7	-1
(Italy) Pistoiese	1	3	0	0	3	4	9	-5

=== Group 4 ===
Team	Pts	Pld	W	D	L	GF	GA	GD
(Brazil) Campinas	7	3	2	1	0	5	3	+2
(Italy) Napoli	5	3	1	2	0	3	2	+1
(Italy) Perugia	4	3	1	1	1	5	5	0
(Australia) Marconi Stallions	0	3	0	0	3	1	4	-3

=== Group 5 ===
Team	Pts	Pld	W	D	L	GF	GA	GD
(Italy) Fiorentina	9	3	3	0	0	7	1	+6
(Italy) Salernitana	6	3	0	2	1	3	1	+2
(Brazil) São Bento	3	3	1	0	2	2	5	-3
(South Africa) Jomo Cosmos	0	3	0	0	3	0	5	-5

=== Group 6 ===
Team	Pts	Pld	W	D	L	GF	GA	GD
(Italy) Inter Milan	6	3	2	0	1	7	1	+6
(Italy) Verona	6	3	2	0	1	9	1	+8
(Brazil) Matsubara	3	3	1	0	2	9	3	+6
(United States) Commack United NY	3	3	1	0	2	0	20	-20

=== Group 7 ===
Team	Pts	Pld	W	D	L	GF	GA	GD
(Italy) Juventus	7	3	2	1	0	9	3	+6
(Italy) Vicenza	7	3	2	1	0	6	4	+2
(Brazil) Linense	1	3	0	1	2	5	7	-2
(Denmark) AB	1	3	0	1	3	4	10	-6

=== Group 8 ===
Team	Pts	Pld	W	D	L	GF	GA	GD
(Italy) Roma	9	3	3	0	0	13	2	+11
(Brazil) Irineu	4	3	1	1	1	6	6	0
(Mexico) Pumas	4	3	1	1	1	3	3	0
(Italy) Livorno	0	3	0	0	3	3	14	-11

=== Group 9 ===
Team	Pts	Pld	W	D	L	GF	GA	GD
(Italy) Atalanta	7	3	2	1	0	5	1	+4
(Brazil) Vitória	5	3	2	1	0	2	1	+1
(Switzerland) Lugano	3	3	1	0	2	2	4	-2
(Italy) Siena	1	3	0	1	2	1	4	-3

=== Group 10 ===
Team	Pts	Pld	W	D	L	GF	GA	GD
(Italy) Parma	7	3	2	1	0	10	3	+7
(Italy) Pontedera	5	3	1	2	0	6	5	+1
(Italy) Genoa	4	3	1	1	1	7	7	0
(Nigeria) Udoji United	0	3	0	0	3	4	12	-8

== Knockout stage ==
Round of 16
1 march
(Italy) Juventus	0
(Italy) Empoli	2
1 march
(Italy) Roma	0 (4)
(Brazil) Corinthians (pen)	0 (5)
1 march
(Italy) Parma	1
(Italy) Brescia	0
1 march
(Italy) Inter Milan (pen)	1 (4)
(Italy) Salernitana	1 (2)
1 march
(Brazil) Campinas	2
(Italy) Verona	0
1 march
(Italy) Lazio	1
(Italy) Vicenza	4
1 march
(Italy) Fiorentina (pen)	0 (6)
(Italy) Atalanta	0 (5)
1 march
(Italy) Bari	3
(Italy) Pontedera	2

Quarter-finals
2 march
(Italy) Empoli	3
(Brazil) Corinthians	0
2 march
(Italy) Parma	1
(Italy) Inter Milan	2
2 march
(Brazil) Campinas	2
(Italy) Vicenza	1
2 march
(Italy) Fiorentina (pen)	1 (3)
(Italy) Bari	1 (1)

Semi-finals
4 march
(Italy) Empoli (Pld.Pld. a.e.t.)	3
(Italy) Inter Milan	2
4 march
(Brazil) Campinas	0 (2)
(Italy) Fiorentina (pen)	0 (4)

Final
6 march
(Italy) Empoli	2
(Italy) Fiorentina	1
Third place
6 march
(Italy) Inter Milan	1
(Brazil) Campinas	2

== Champions ==
Torneo di Viareggio 2000 Champions

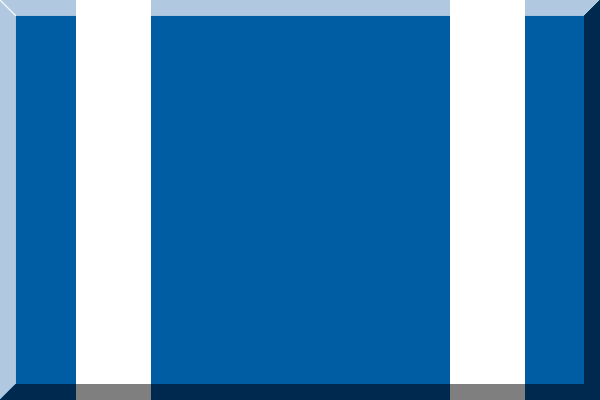

Empoli
1st time
