= 2011–12 AC Siena season =

Siena
2011–12 season
- President: Massimo Mezzaroma
- Head Coach: Giuseppe Sannino
- Stadium: Stadio Artemio Franchi
- Serie A: 14th
- Coppa Italia: Semi-finals
- Top goalscorer: League: Mattia Destro (12); All: Mattia Destro (13)
Home colours	Away colours	Third colours

The 2011–12 season was Associazione Calcio Siena's 106th in existence and 8th season in the top flight of Italian football, Serie A.

== First Team ==
Players and squad numbers last updated on 30 May 2012. Note: Flags indicate national team as has been defined under FIFA eligibility rules. Players may hold more than one non-FIFA nationality.

No.	Name	Nationality	Position	Date of birth (age)	Signed from	Notes
Goalkeepers
1	Željko Brkić	(Serbia)	GK	9 July 1986 (age 40)	Udinese	on loan from Udinese
12	Simone Farelli	(Italy)	GK	19 February 1983 (age 43)	Crotone	
25	Gianluca Pegolo	(Italy)	GK	25 March 1981 (age 45)	Genoa	
Defenders
2	Roberto Vitiello	(Italy)	RB	8 May 1983 (age 43)	Rimini	
4	Cristiano Del Grosso	(Italy)	LB	24 March 1983 (age 43)	Cagliari	
13	Luca Rossettini	(Italy)	CB	9 May 1985 (age 41)	Padova	
15	Nicola Belmonte	(Italy)	RB	15 April 1987 (age 39)	Bari	
19	Claudio Terzi	(Italy)	CB	19 June 1984 (age 42)	Bologna	
21	Andrea Rossi	(Italy)	LB	7 November 1986 (age 40)	Juventus Primavera	
26	Emanuele Pesoli	(Italy)	CB	31 August 1980 (age 46)	Varese	
80	Matteo Contini	(Italy)	CB	16 April 1980 (age 46)	(Spain) Zaragoza	on loan from Zaragoza
Midfielders
5	Paul Codrea	(Romania)	CM	4 April 1981 (age 45)	Palermo	
6	Ângelo	(Brazil)	MF	12 June 1981 (age 45)	Parma	
7	Luigi Giorgi	(Italy)	MF	19 April 1987 (age 39)	Novara	on loan from Novara
8	Simone Vergassola	(Italy)	DM	24 January 1976 (age 50)	Torino	Captain
10	Gaetano D'Agostino	(Italy)	MF	2 June 1982 (age 44)	Fiorentina	
14	Alessandro Gazzi	(Italy)	MF	28 January 1983 (age 43)	Bari	
17	Paolo Grossi	(Italy)	LW	29 May 1985 (age 41)	AlbinoLeffe	
20	Joel Acosta	(Argentina)	MF	16 January 1991 (age 35)	(Argentina) Boca Juniors	on loan from Boca Juniors
36	Francesco Bolzoni	(Italy)	CM	7 May 1989 (age 37)	Genoa	
55	Francesco Parravicini	(Italy)	CM	31 January 1982 (age 44)	Parma	
70	Daniele Mannini	(Italy)	RW	25 October 1983 (age 43)	Sampdoria	
77	Alessio Sestu	(Italy)	MF	29 September 1983 (age 43)	Vicenza	
Forwards
9	Marcelo Larrondo	(Argentina)	ST	16 August 1988 (age 38)	(Uruguay) Progrese	
11	Emanuele Calaiò	(Italy)	ST	8 January 1982 (age 44)	Napoli	Vice-captain
14	Pablo González	(Argentina)	FW	28 May 1985 (age 41)	Palermo	on loan from Palermo
22	Mattia Destro	(Italy)	ST	29 March 1991 (age 35)	Genoa	on loan from Genoa
23	Franco Brienza	(Italy)	FW	19 March 1979 (age 47)	Reggina	
32	Erjon Bogdani	(Albania)	ST	14 April 1977 (age 49)	Cesena	
Players transferred during the season
7	Gennaro Troianiello	(Italy)	MF	21 March 1983 (age 43)	Frosinone	on loan to Sassuolo
27	Milan Milanović	(Serbia)	CB	31 March 1991 (age 35)	Palermo	recalled from loan by Palermo
33	Gabriele Angella	(Italy)	CB	28 April 1989 (age 37)	Udinese	recalled from loan by Udinese
83	Reginaldo	(Brazil)	FW	31 July 1983 (age 43)	Parma	on loan to (Japan) JEF United Ichihara Chiba
89	Mihail Ivanov	(Bulgaria)	GK	7 August 1989 (age 37)	Youth System	on loan to Piacenza

== Transfers ==
For a list of all A.C. Siena transfers, see List of Italian football transfers winter 2011–12, List of Italian football transfers summer 2011 (July), List of Italian football transfers summer 2011 (August), List of Italian football transfers summer 2011 (co-ownership)

== Statistics ==
=== Goals and appearances ===
Substitute appearances off of the bench appear only in parentheses.

No.	Pos.	Name	League		Coppa Italia		Total		Discipline	
No.	Pos.	Name	Apps	Goals	Apps	Goals	Apps	Goals	Yellow card	Red card
1	GK	(Serbia) Željko Brkić	18	0	2	0	20	0	1	0
2	DF	(Italy) Roberto Vitiello	33	1	1(1)	0	34(1)	1	7	0
3	DF	(Italy) Cristiano Del Grosso	31(1)	2	1	0	32(1)	2	7	0
5	MF	(Romania) Paul Codrea	0(1)	0	1(1)	0	1(2)	0	0	0
6	MF	(Brazil) Ângelo	7(6)	0	5	2	12(6)	2	1	0
7	MF	(Italy) Luigi Giorgi	12(1)	1	0(1)	0	12(2)	1	3	0
7	MF	(Italy) Gennaro Troianiello	0	0	2	0	2	0	0	0
8	MF	(Italy) Simone Vergassola	23(6)	0	2	0	25(6)	0	3	0
9	FW	(Argentina) Marcelo Larrondo	6(8)	1	2(2)	0	8(10)	1	3	0
10	MF	(Italy) Gaetano D'Agostino	19(5)	3	2	1	21(5)	8	7	0
11	FW	(Italy) Emanuele Calaiò	24(1)	11	1	1	25(1)	12	5	0
12	GK	(Italy) Simone Farelli	1	0	2	0	3	0	0	0
13	DF	(Italy) Luca Rossettini	30(1)	1	2	0	32(1)	1	11	0
14	MF	(Italy) Alessandro Gazzi	31(2)	1	2	0	33(2)	1	7	0
15	DF	(Italy) Nicola Belmonte	1(1)	0	4	0	5(1)	0	0	0
17	MF	(Italy) Paolo Grossi	9(8)	1	2	0	11(8)	1	1	1
18	FW	(Argentina) Pablo González	5(11)	1	3(1)	2	8(12)	3	1	0
19	DF	(Italy) Claudio Terzi	33(2)	1	2(1)	0	35(3)	1	12	0
20	MF	(Argentina) Joel Acosta	0	0	0	0	0	0	0	0
21	DF	(Italy) Andrea Rossi	7(3)	0	5	0	12(3)	0	7	0
22	FW	(Italy) Mattia Destro	26(4)	12	1(1)	1	27(5)	13	5	0
23	FW	(Italy) Franco Brienza	34(2)	4	2(1)	0	36(3)	4	4	1
25	GK	(Italy) Gianluca Pegolo	19	0	2	0	21	0	1	1
26	DF	(Italy) Emanuele Pesoli	7(2)	0	4	0	11(2)	0	4	0
33	DF	(Italy) Gabriele Angella	0	0	0(2)	0	0(2)	0	0	0
36	MF	(Italy) Francesco Bolzoni	8(8)	1	2(2)	0	10(10)	1	2	0
55	MF	(Italy) Francesco Parravicini	1(8)	0	3(1)	0	4(9)	0	3	0
70	MF	(Italy) Daniele Mannini	12(9)	0	3	0	15(9)	0	4	0
77	MF	(Italy) Alessio Sestu	1(4)	0	0(3)	0	1(7)	0	1	0
80	DF	(Italy) Matteo Contini	12(4)	0	4	0	16(4)	0	4	0
81	FW	(Albania) Erjon Bogdani	4(7)	4	1(1)	0	5(8)	4	0	0
83	FW	(Brazil) Reginaldo	4(9)	0	5	3	9(9)	3	1	0

Last updated: 29 May 2012
Source: Statistics from legaseriea.it

=== Top scorers ===
Includes all competitive matches. The list is sorted by shirt number when total goals are equal.

R	No.	Pos	Nat	Name	Serie A	Coppa Italia	Total
1	22	ST	(Italy)	Mattia Destro	12	1	13
2	10	ST	(Italy)	Emanuele Calaiò	11	1	12
3	10	CM	(Italy)	Gaetano D'Agostino	3	1	4
"	23	FW	(Italy)	Franco Brienza	4	0	4
"	81	ST	(Albania)	Erjon Bogdani	4	0	4

Last updated: 29 May 2012
Source: Statistics from legaseriea.it

=== Most appearances ===
Includes all competitive matches.

R	No.	Pos	Nat	Name	Serie A	Coppa Italia	Total
1	23	FW	(Italy)	Franco Brienza	36	3	39
2	19	CB	(Italy)	Claudio Terzi	35	3	38
3	14	MF	(Italy)	Alessandro Gazzi	33	2	35
4	2	RB	(Italy)	Roberto Vitiello	33	1	34
5	4	LB	(Italy)	Cristiano Del Grosso	32	1	33
"	13	CB	(Italy)	Luca Rossettini	31	2	33

Last updated: 29 May 2012
Source: Statistics from legaseriea.it

== Club ==
Coaching staff

Position	Staff
Head coach	(Italy) Giuseppe Sannino
Assistant coach	(Italy) Francesco Baiano
Technical Collaborator	(Italy) Luca Lomi
Goalkeepers' coach	(Italy) Marco Savorani
Athletic coach	(Italy) Francesco Bertini (Italy) Giorgio D'Urbano (Italy) Giovanni Saracini

Last updated: May 2012
Source: Staff

== Competitions ==
=== Overall ===
Competition	Started round	Final position / round	First match	Last match
Serie A	—	14th	11 September 2011	13 May 2012
Coppa Italia	Third round	Semi-finals	21 August 2011	21 March 2012

Updated to match played 20 May 2012
Source: Competitions

=== Serie A ===
==== League table ====
Pos	Team	Pld	W	D	L	GF	GA	GD	Pts
12	Atalanta (Note: Atalanta were deducted 6 points due to involvement in the 2011–12 Italian football scandal.)	38	13	13	12	41	43	−2	46 (Note: Atalanta finished ahead of Fiorentina on head–to–head away goals scored: Atalanta 2–0 Fiorentina, Fiorentina 2–2 Atalanta.)
13	Fiorentina	38	11	13	14	37	43	−6	46
14	Siena	38	11	11	16	45	45	0	44
15	Cagliari	38	10	13	15	37	46	−9	43 (Note: Cagliari finished ahead of Palermo on goal difference : Cagliari 2–1 Palermo, Palermo 3–2 Cagliari; Cagliari = –9, Palermo = –10.)
16	Palermo	38	11	10	17	52	62	−10	43

Source: Lega Serie A
Rules for classification: 1) points; 2) head-to-head points; 3) head-to-head goal difference; 4) head-to-head goals scored; 5) goal difference; 6) number of goals scored

==== Results summary ====
Overall								Home						Away					
Pld	W	D	L	GF	GA	GD	Pts	W	D	L	GF	GA	GD	W	D	L	GF	GA	GD
38	11	11	16	45	45	0	44	8	4	7	27	19	+8	3	7	9	18	26	−8

Last updated: 13 May 2012.
Source: Lega Serie A - Standings

==== Results by round ====
Round	1	2	3	4	5	6	7	8	9	10	11	12	13	14	15	16	17	18	19	20	21	22	23	24	25	26	27	28	29	30	31	32	33	34	35	36	37	38
Ground	H	A	H	A	H	A	A	H	A	H	A	H	H	A	H	A	H	A	H	A	H	A	H	A	H	H	A	H	A	H	A	A	H	A	H	A	H	A
Result	D	D	L	D	W	L	D	W	D	W	L	D	L	L	L	L	W	L	D	L	L	D	W	L	W	W	W	L	D	W	W	L	D	W	L	D	L	L
Position	14	15	18	17	13	17	15	12	12	8	10	12	13	15	16	16	16	17	17	17	17	17	17	17	17	17	14	15	15	13	11	13	14	11	13	13	14	14

Updated to match(es) played on 13 May 2012. Source: Competitive matches
A = Away; H = Home; W = Win; D = Draw; L = Loss

==== Matches ====
The fixtures for the 2011–12 Serie A season were announced by the Lega Serie A on 27 July.

Win Draw Loss

11 September 2011 2	Catania	0–0	Siena	Catania
15:00 CEST (UTC+02)	Lanzafame (yellow card) 11'; Biagianti (yellow card) 62'	Report	González (yellow card) 37'; Rossettini (yellow card) 65'; Terzi (yellow card) 77'; Calaiò (yellow card) 90+4'	Stadium: Stadio Angelo Massimino; Attendance: 13,268; Referee: Luca Banti

18 September 2011 3	Siena	0–1	Juventus	Siena
15:00 CEST (UTC+02)	Del Grosso (yellow card) 34'; Terzi (yellow card) 90+2'	Report	Matri 54'	Stadium: Stadio Artemio Franchi; Attendance: 15,265; Referee: Paolo Valeri

22 September 2011 4	Roma	1–1	Siena	Rome
15:00 CEST (UTC+02)	Osvaldo 25'; Burdisso (yellow card) 82'	Report	Vitiello 88'; Rossi (yellow card) 90+1'	Stadium: Stadio Olimpico; Attendance: 34,896; Referee: Marco Guida

25 September 2011 5	Siena	3–0	Lecce	Siena
15:00 CEST (UTC+02)	Destro 6', (yellow card) 7'; Calaiò 53', 70'; D'Agostino (yellow card) 66'	Report	Tomović (yellow card) 39'; Esposito (yellow card) 45+1' (yellow-red card) 61'	Stadium: Stadio Artemio Franchi; Attendance: 8,469; Referee: Daniele Doveri

2 October 2011 6	Palermo	2–0	Siena	Palermo
15:00 CEST (UTC+02)	Migliaccio 19'; Miccoli (yellow card) 36'; Federico Balzaretti (yellow card) 41' (yellow-red card) 54'; Hernández (yellow card) 86', (goal) 90+4' (pen.); Tzorvas (yellow card) 90+2'	Report	Rossettini (yellow card) 18'; Terzi (yellow card) 58'; Rossi (yellow card) 82'; Vitiello (yellow card) 90+3'	Stadium: Stadio Renzo Barbera; Attendance: 20,461; Referee: Andrea Romeo

16 October 2011 7	Cagliari	0–0	Siena	Cagliari
15:00 CEST (UTC+02)	Canini (yellow card) 37'	Report	Calaiò (yellow card) 29'; Mannini (yellow card) 64'; Rossettini (yellow card) 73'	Stadium: Stadio Sant'Elia; Referee: Dino Tommasi

23 October 2011 8	Siena	2–0	Cesena	Siena
15:00 CEST (UTC+02)	González 9'; Rossettini (yellow card) 41'; Calaiò 53'	Report	Candreva (yellow card) 74'	Stadium: Stadio Artemio Franchi; Attendance: 8,935; Referee: Nicola Rizzoli

26 October 2011 9	Novara	1–1	Siena	Novara
20:45 CEST (UTC+02)	Centurioni (yellow card) 70'; Gemiti 80'; Meggiorini (yellow card) 90+2'	Report	Calaiò 17'; Vitiello (yellow card) 58'; Terzi (yellow card) 74'; Contini (yellow card) 81'	Stadium: Stadio Silvio Piola; Attendance: 8,384; Referee: Paolo Tagliavento

30 October 2011 10	Siena	4–1	Chievo	Siena
12:30 CEST (UTC+02)	Destro 25', 57'; D'Agostino 61'; Larrondo (yellow card) 88'; Calaiò 90+4'	Report	Cruzado (yellow card) 39'; Jokić (yellow card) 47'; Hetemaj (yellow card) 61'; Cesar (yellow card) 67'; Moscardelli 75'; Mandelli (yellow card) 89'	Stadium: Stadio Artemio Franchi; Attendance: 8,472; Referee: Christian Brighi

6 November 2011 11	Udinese	2–1	Siena	Udine
15:00 CET (UTC+01)	Basta 1'; Di Natale 64'	Report	Brienza (yellow card) 36'; Calaiò (yellow card) 74'; Bolzoni 76'	Stadium: Stadio Friuli; Attendance: 16,033; Referee: Carmine Russo

15 November 2011 12	Siena	2–2	Atalanta	Siena
15:00 CET (UTC+01)	D'Agostino (yellow card) 22', (goal) 44' (pen.); Destro (yellow card) 50'; Gazzi 87'; Rossettini (yellow card) 90+1'	Report	Denis 15' (pen.), 53'; Lucchini (yellow card) 50'; Peluso (yellow card) 56'	Stadium: Stadio Artemio Franchi; Attendance: 8,526; Referee: Daniele Doveri

27 November 2011 13	Siena	0–1	Internazionale	Siena
15:00 CET (UTC+01)	Terzi (yellow card) 38'; Brienza (yellow card) 80' (yellow-red card) 90+1'; Mannini (yellow card) 90+4'	Report	Ranocchia (yellow card) 14'; Stanković (yellow card) 88'; Castaignos 89'	Stadium: Stadio Artemio Franchi; Attendance: 13,587; Referee: Andrea De Marco

4 December 2011 14	Bologna	1–0	Siena	Bologna
15:00 CET (UTC+01)	Di Vaio 28'; Pulzetti (yellow card) 31'	Report	D'Agostino (yellow card) 42'; Vitiello (yellow card) 67'	Stadium: Stadio Renato Dall'Ara; Attendance: 18,316; Referee: Paolo Mazzoleni

12 December 2011 15	Siena	0–2	Genoa	Siena
18:00 CET (UTC+01)	Rossi (yellow card) 68'; Gazzi (yellow card) 74'; Contini (yellow card) 89'; Brienza (yellow card) 90+2'	Report	Zé Eduardo (yellow card) 38'; Rossi 56'; Constant (yellow card) 90+2'; Palacio 90+2'	Stadium: Stadio Artemio Franchi; Attendance: 9,190; Referee: Marco Guida

12 December 2011 1	Siena	0–0	Fiorentina	Siena
18:00 CET (UTC+01)	D'Agostino (yellow card) 22'; Gazzi (yellow card) 31'; Larrondo (yellow card) 84'; Rossettini (yellow card) 87'; Vitiello (yellow card) 89'	Report	Montolivo (yellow card) 26'; De Silvestri (yellow card) 33'; Behrami (yellow card) 78'; Gilardino (yellow card) 83'; Gamberini (yellow card) 84'	Stadium: Stadio Artemio Franchi; Attendance: 9,117; Referee: Luca Banti
Note: The start of the Serie A season was postponed from its scheduled start (August 27 and 28) to a future date because of a strike declared by the Italian Footballers' Association. The round was later rescheduled for December 21.

17 December 2011 16	Milan	2–0	Siena	Milan
20:45 CET (UTC+01)	Seedorf (yellow card) 50'; Nocerino 53'; Ibrahimović 63' (pen.)	Report	Gazzi (yellow card) 35'; Brkić (yellow card) 62'	Stadium: Stadio San Siro; Attendance: 41,759; Referee: Mauro Bergonzi

7 January 2012 17	Siena	4–0	Lazio	Siena
18:00 CET (UTC+01)	Destro 11', 81', (yellow card) 12'; Calaiò 35' (pen.), 45+4' (pen.); Rossettini (yellow card) 54'; Del Grosso (yellow card) 88'	Report	Bizzarri (red card) 45+2'; Sculli (yellow card) 74'	Stadium: Stadio Artemio Franchi; Attendance: 10,270; Referee: Andrea Gervasoni

15 January 2012 18	Parma	3–1	Siena	Parma
15:00 CET (UTC+01)	Biabiany 24'; Morrone (yellow card) 40'; Zaccardo (yellow card) 56'; Valiani 66'; Pavarini (yellow card) 90+2'; Giovinco 90+4'	Report	Rossettini (yellow card) 14'; Gazzi (yellow card) 27'; Grossi 79'	Stadium: Stadio Ennio Tardini; Attendance: 11,570; Referee: Sebastiano Peruzzo

22 January 2012 19	Siena	1–1	Napoli	Siena
15:00 CET (UTC+01)	Vitiello (yellow card) 28'; Pesoli (yellow card) 59'; Calaiò 67'; Bolzoni (yellow card) 72'; D'Agostino (yellow card) 80'	Report	Campagnaro (yellow card) 3'; Aronica (yellow card) 75'; Cavani (penalty missed) 79'; Pandev 86'	Stadium: Stadio Artemio Franchi; Attendance: 14,643; Referee: Antonio Damato

29 January 2012 20	Fiorentina	2–1	Siena	Florence
12:30 CET (UTC+01)	Jovetić 4'; Natali 63'; Nastasić (yellow card) 88'	Report	Brienza (yellow card) 47'; Del Grosso (yellow card) 62'; Calaiò 89'	Stadium: Stadio Artemio Franchi; Attendance: 16,784; Referee: Mauro Bergonzi

5 February 2012 22	Juventus	0–0	Siena	Turin
15:00 CET (UTC+01)	Barzagli (yellow card) 74'; Borriello (yellow card) 84'; Chiellini (yellow card) 90+3'	Report	Pegolo (yellow card) 72'; Parravicini (yellow card) 90+4'	Stadium: Juventus Stadium; Attendance: 35,226; Referee: Sebastiano Peruzzo

13 February 2012 23	Siena	1–0	Roma	Siena
20:45 CET (UTC+01)	Calaiò 51' (pen.); Grossi (yellow card) 87'	Report	Totti (yellow card) 41'; Kjær (yellow card) 50'	Stadium: Stadio Artemio Franchi; Attendance: 9,288; Referee: Gianluca Rocchi

19 February 2012 24	Lecce	4–1	Siena	Lecce
12:30 CET (UTC+01)	Muriel 32'; Obodo (yellow card) 38'; Carrozzieri (yellow card) 54'; Di Michele 68' (pen.); Cuadrado (yellow card) 80', (goal) 82'; Blasi (red card) 90+2'; Brivio 90+4'	Report	Reginaldo (yellow card) 21'; Del Grosso 25', (yellow card) 75'; Terzi (yellow card) 35'; Rossettini (yellow card) 52'; Vergassola (yellow card) 85'	Stadium: Stadio Via del Mare; Attendance: 6,519; Referee: Nicola Rizzoli

22 February 2012 21	Siena	0–1	Catania	Siena
18:30 CET (UTC+01)	Calaiò (yellow card) 34'; Gazzi (yellow card) 48'	Report	Lodi 23' (pen.); Legrottaglie (yellow card) 63'; Carrizo (yellow card) 79'	Stadium: Stadio Artemio Franchi; Attendance: 8,242; Referee: Carmine Russo
Note: The match was postponed from February 1 to February 22 because of snow.

26 February 2012 25	Siena	4–1	Palermo	Siena
15:00 CET (UTC+01)	Terzi 23' (pen.), (yellow card) 28'; Bogdani 33'; Rossettini 46' (yellow card) 88'; Brienza 58'	Report	Federico Balzaretti (red card) 2'; Budan (yellow card) 5', (goal) 12'; Viviano (yellow card) 21'; Donati (yellow card) 22'; Miccoli (yellow card) 22'; Barreto (yellow card) 90+3'	Stadium: Stadio Artemio Franchi; Attendance: 8,604; Referee: Gabriele Gava

4 March 2012 26	Siena	3–0	Cagliari	Siena
15:00 CET (UTC+01)	Bogdani 40'; Gazzi (yellow card) 54'; Calaiò 80' (yellow card) 81'; Del Grosso 82'	Report	Astori (yellow card) 90+3'	Stadium: Stadio Artemio Franchi; Attendance: 8,529; Referee: Daniele Doveri

11 March 2012 27	Cesena	0–2	Siena	Cesena
15:00 CET (UTC+01)	Arrigoni (yellow card) 7'; Ceccarelli (red card) 28'; Moras (yellow card) 43'	Report	Terzi (penalty missed) 30'; Brienza 30'; Del Grosso (yellow card) 34'; Bogdani 36'	Stadium: Stadio Dino Manuzzi; Attendance: 15,360; Referee: Antonio Damato

18 March 2012 28	Siena	0–2	Novara	Siena
15:00 CET (UTC+01)	Terzi (yellow card) 65'	Report	Morganella (yellow card) 41'; Rigoni 72'; Porcari 81'	Stadium: Stadio Artemio Franchi; Attendance: 9,891; Referee: Domenico Celi

25 March 2012 29	Cheivo	1–1	Siena	Verona
15:00 CEST (UTC+02)	Acerbi 9'; Frey (yellow card) 49'; Sammarco (yellow card) 49'; Moscardelli (yellow card) 88'	Report	Giorgi (yellow card) 22'; Gazzi (yellow card) 37'; Destro 51'; Vergassola (yellow card) 60'	Stadium: Stadio Marc'Antonio Bentegodi; Attendance: 6,500; Referee: Daniele Doveri

1 April 2012 30	Siena	1–0	Udinese	Siena
15:00 CEST (UTC+02)	Rossettini (yellow card) 5'; Larrondo (yellow card) 39'; Destro 70'; Contini (yellow card) 84'; Brienza (yellow card) 90'	Report	Pinzi (yellow card) 55'; Barreto (yellow card) 84'; Handanović (yellow card) 90'	Stadium: Stadio Artemio Franchi; Attendance: 9,094; Referee: Paolo Tagliavento

7 April 2012 31	Atalanta	1–2	Siena	Bergamo
15:00 CEST (UTC+02)	Schelotto 9'; Stendardo (yellow card) 40'; Manfredini (yellow card) 89'	Report	Larrondo 13' (pen.); Terzi (yellow card) 86'; Giorgi (yellow card) 90'; Destro 90+1'	Stadium: Stadio Atleti Azzurri d'Italia; Attendance: 15,508; Referee: Carmine Russo

11 April 2012 32	Internazionale	2–1	Siena	Milan
20:45 CEST (UTC+02)	Samuel (yellow card) 20'; Milito 42', 81' (pen.)	Report	D'Agostino 6'; Pesoli (yellow card) 44'; Vitiello (yellow card) 60'; Mannini (yellow card) 84'; Contini (yellow card) 84'	Stadium: San Siro; Attendance: 46,327; Referee: Andrea Romeo

22 April 2012 34	Genoa	1–4	Siena	Genoa
15:00 CEST (UTC+02)	Mesto (yellow card) 18'; Rossi (yellow card) 26'; Gilardino (yellow card) 50'; Del Grosso 79' (o.g.)	Report	Brienza 17', 37'; Destro 19'; Del Grosso (yellow card) 26'; Giorgi 49', (yellow card) 49'	Stadium: Stadio Luigi Ferraris; Attendance: 20,078; Referee: Paolo Tagliavento

25 April 2012 33	Siena	1–1	Bologna	Siena
15:00 CEST (UTC+02)	Destro 52'; Vergassola (yellow card) 68'; Vitiello (yellow card) 74'; Rossi (yellow card) 81'	Report	Brkić 69' (o.g.)	Stadium: Stadio Artemio Franchi; Attendance: 9,011; Referee: Gianpaolo Calvarese
Note: All the fixtures of April 14–15 weekend were postponed due to Piermario Morosini's death and rescheduled to April 24–25.

29 April 2012 35	Siena	1–4	Milan	Siena
15:00 CEST (UTC+02)	Terzi (yellow card) 15'; Del Grosso (yellow card) 40'; Bogdani 83'	Report	Cassano 26'; Ibrahimović 29', 90+5'; Gattuso (yellow card) 50'; Van Bommel (yellow card) 79'; Nocerino 90'	Stadium: Stadio Artemio Franchi; Attendance: 14,655; Referee: Christian Brighi

2 May 2012 36	Lazio	1–1	Siena	Rome
20:45 CEST (UTC+02)	Biava (yellow card) 16'; Ledesma (yellow card) 41' (goal) 62' (pen.)	Report	Destro 27'; Bolzoni (yellow card) 61'; Rossi (yellow card) 90+2'	Stadium: Stadio Olimpico; Attendance: 26,194; Referee: Domenico Celi

6 May 2012 37	Siena	0–2	Parma	Siena
12:30 CEST (UTC+02)	Terzi (yellow card) 18'; Contini (yellow card) 85'	Report	Giovinco 67'; Floccari 90+2'	Stadium: Stadio Artemio Franchi; Attendance: 8,644; Referee: Silvio Baratta

13 May 2012 38	Napoli	2–1	Siena	Naples
20:45 CEST (UTC+02)	Dossena 3', 34', (yellow card) 35'; Campagnaro (yellow card) 30'; Hamšík (yellow card) 40'; Lavezzi (yellow card) 90'	Report	Destro 6', (yellow card) 15'; Parravicini (yellow card) 56'; D'Agostino (yellow card) 59'; Terzi (yellow card) 86'	Stadium: Stadio San Paolo; Attendance: 43,582; Referee: Domenico Celi

=== Coppa Italia ===
21 August 2011 Third round	Siena	1–0	Torino	Siena
20:45 CEST (UTC+02)	Calaiò 80' (pen.)	Report		Stadium: Stadio Artemio Franchi; Attendance: 1,007; Referee: Paolo Valeri

24 November 2011 Fourth round	Cagliari	1–2	Siena	Cagliari
21:15 CET (UTC+01)	Conti (red card) 75'; Sampaio (yellow card) 75', (goal) 84'; Gozzi (yellow card) 80'	Report	González 16'; Troianiello (yellow card) 19'; Ângelo 52'; Rossi (yellow card) 74'; Sestu (yellow card) 82'	Stadium: Stadio Sant'Elia; Attendance: 2,000; Referee: Gianpaolo Calvarese

13 December 2011 Round of 16	Palermo	4–4 (a.e.t.) (0–3 p)	Siena	Palermo
21:00 CET (UTC+01)	Iličić 39' (pen.), 46', 90+1' (pen.); Migliaccio (yellow card) 41'; Cetto (yellow card) 64'; Bertolo 98'	Report	Reginaldo 21', 59'; González 40'; Pegolo (yellow card) 84'; Ângelo (yellow card) 89', (goal) 100'; Angella (yellow card) 108'	Stadium: Stadio Renzo Barbera; Attendance: 6,489; Referee: Andrea Gervasoni
	Penalties
	Bollino (penalty missed); Iličić (penalty missed); Cetto (penalty missed)		(penalty scored) González; (penalty scored) Pesoli; (penalty scored) Ângelo

25 January 2012 Quarter-finals	Chievo	0–1	Siena	Verona
17:30 CET (UTC+01)	Vacek (yellow card) 64'	Report	Parravicini (yellow card) 50'; Destro 54'; Grossi (red card) 60'	Stadium: Stadio Marc'Antonio Bentegodi; Attendance: 3,000; Referee: Daniele Doveri

9 February 2012 Semi Final–1st Leg	Siena	2–1	Napoli	Siena
20:45 CET (UTC+01)	Mannini (yellow card) 19'; Reginaldo 42'; D'Agostino 66'	Report	Pandev (yellow card) 18'; Campagnaro (yellow card) 23'; Pesoli 86' (o.g.)	Stadium: Stadio Artemio Franchi – Montepaschi Arena; Attendance: 4,616; Referee: Andrea De Marco

21 March 2012 Semi Final–2nd Leg	Napoli	2–0	Siena	Naples
20:45 CET (UTC+01)	Vergassola 10' (o.g.); Cavani 31'; Gargano (yellow card) 38'	Report	Mannini (yellow card) 55'; Pesoli (yellow card) 80'	Stadium: Stadio San Paolo; Attendance: 56,418; Referee: Paolo Valeri
