= 2011–12 US Città di Palermo season =

U.S. Città di Palermo
2011–12 season
- Chairman: Maurizio Zamparini
- Head coach: Stefano Pioli (pre-season, until 31 August 2011); Devis Mangia (from 31 August to 19 December 2011); Bortolo Mutti (from 19 December 2011)
- Serie A: 16th
- UEFA Europa League: 3rd Preliminary Round
- Coppa Italia: Round of 16
Home colours	Away colours	Third colours

U.S. Città di Palermo played the 2011–12 season in Serie A, the eighth consecutive season for the Sicilian club in the Italian top flight since their return to the league in 2004. The club ended the season in 16th place, the worst result in all of its last eight Serie A seasons.

The Sicilian club took part in two cup competitions, the UEFA Europa League and the Coppa Italia, being eliminated immediately in both of them.

== Review and events ==
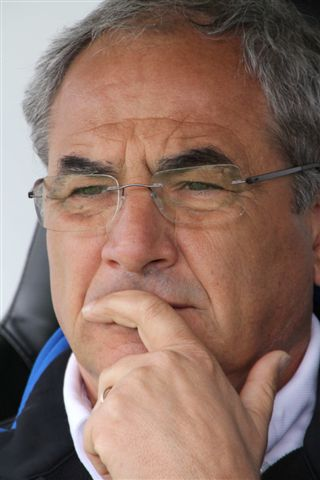
Incumbent head coach Bortolo Mutti, appointed in December 2011 in place of Devis Mangia.

Following Palermo's last game of the 2010–11 season, a 3–1 loss to Internazionale in the Coppa Italia final, Chairman Maurizio Zamparini announced to have parted company with head coach Delio Rossi, and announced Stefano Pioli as new trainer the very next day. Pioli's own coaching staff will be composed by four members: assistant Giacomo Murelli, technical collaborator Davide Lucarelli, fitness coach Matteo Osti and Graziano Vinti (a past Palermo player in the 1990s) as goalkeeping coach. The club then announced to have hired Sean Sogliano as new director of football on 8 June, filling a vacancy created by the resignation of Walter Sabatini in November 2010.

As in previous seasons, Palermo also acquired a number of young international starts. Many of these acquisitions were announced before the end of the previous seasons: signings of defenders Carlos Labrín and Milan Milanović, as well as striker Pablo González, were made public already in January 2011. Later on in May, the club confirmed the acquisitions of Eros Pisano from Serie B club Varese, Israeli international Eran Zahavi from Hapoel Tel Aviv and Ádám Simon from Szombathelyi Haladás in Hungary. In June, the club also announced the free signing of defender Mauro Cetto from Toulouse in France.

On 17 June, the club confirmed to have appointed Varese youth coach Devis Mangia at the helm of the Primavera under-19 squad, replacing Paolo Beruatto.

On 2 July, the squad officially gathered together in Verona, and on the same day, Maurizio Zamparini personally introduced new head coach Stefano Pioli to the press; on the following day, the players and non-playing staff moved to Malles Venosta, South Tyrol, for the pre-season training camp that took place until 20 July.

On 5 July, defender Andrea Mantovani joined the Palermo squad, after the Sicilian club managed to find an agreement with Chievo regarding his signing. The acquisition was formally confirmed by the club the following day, with the player signing a four-year deal with the Sicilians.

On 9 July, Palermo confirmed the acquisition of Uruguayan youngster Ignacio Lores from Defensor Sporting in a five-year deal. On 25 July, the club announced to have sold Dorin Goian to Scottish champions Rangers and Pajtim Kasami to English Premier League Fulham.

On 28 July, Palermo and Paris Saint-Germain completed the move of first-choice goalkeeper Salvatore Sirigu from Sicily to France; the same day, the rosanero made their seasonal debut, playing at home the first leg of the UEFA Europa League third preliminary round against Swiss side Thun: the game ended in a disappointing 2–2 draw thanks to an injury time free kick equalizer from veteran striker Fabrizio Miccoli. Palermo were successively eliminated on the away goals rule after only achieving a 1–1 draw in the return leg in Thun.

On 6 August, after weeks of speculation linking him to several top-ranked European clubs, Argentine playmaker Javier Pastore left Palermo in order to join Paris Saint-Germain, thus following teammate Salvatore Sirigu in France; the bid was speculated to be in the range of €43 million, a record for the rosanero. In an attempt to reply to dissatisfied supporters after the sales of top players Sirigu and Pastore and rumours of possible transfers involving other key elements, on 9 August the club published the list of all bid amounts spent in new signings during the summer transfer window, also implicitly confirming the acquisitions of Matías Silvestre from fellow islanders Catania, then formalized the very next day.

By the end of August, Palermo also sold two long-time defenders, Cesare Bovo and Mattia Cassani, loaned out respectively to Genoa and Fiorentina.

On 26 August, Palermo confirmed the acquisition of Greek international goalkeeper Alexandros Tzorvas from Panathinaikos.

On 31 August, an eventful day saw Palermo selling Italy international midfielder Antonio Nocerino to Milan and acquire three midfielders: Edgar Álvarez from Bari, Francesco Della Rocca from Bologna and Édgar Barreto from Atalanta. Later on that day, Palermo announced to have surprisingly sacked Stefano Pioli, appointing newly hired youth team coach Devis Mangia on a temporary basis. His first game in charge of team duties, played on 11 September against European powerhouse Inter, ended in an astonishing 4–3 win for the rosanero thanks to a brace from captain Fabrizio Miccoli.

Under debutant coach Mangia, Palermo won all its first five home games, defeating also Cagliari, Siena, Bologna and Lecce; such performances were not confirmed in away games, where the rosanero regularly struggled in winning points and never scored a single goal as of November 2011.

On 2 November 2011, director of football Sean Sogliano tended his resignation due to disagreements with chairman Maurizio Zamparini. He was replaced by Luca Cattani, formerly chief scout at the same club. Sogliano's resignation led to rumours regarding a possible future removal of Devis Mangia as caretaker, which was promptly dismissed two days later, when Palermo announced to have agreed a two-year contract as permanent head coach with the young tactician.

Palermo also enjoyed a string of seven consecutive home wins that ended with a 0–1 loss to Cesena on 10 December. Three days later, the rosanero were surprisingly eliminated from the Coppa Italia after losing 4–7 at home on penalties to Siena (3–3; 4–4 after extra time). A third consecutive loss, a 0–2 defeat in the Sicilian derby against Catania, led to the dismissal of Mangia and his replacement with veteran coach Bortolo Mutti. The first game under his tenure ended in a 2–2 draw at Novara, that also featured the first goals scored by Palermo in an away league fixture during the season.

In the December break, Palermo formalized the signings of attacking midfielder Franco Vázquez and striker Agon Mehmeti, who both made their debut in the first game of the year 2012, a 1–3 home loss to Napoli. Two major signings followed in January as goalkeeper Emiliano Viviano and midfielder Massimo Donati joined the rosanero squad. They made both their debut in Palermo's first win under coach Mutti, a 5–3 home win against Genoa. On 1 February, Palermo achieved a surprise 4–4 draw at San Siro against Inter, three of the goals being scored by Fabrizio Miccoli, that made him the most prolific goalscorer in the whole club history. After snatching a row of positive results, Palermo entered into another string of winless games by February, leaving the club in the second half of the league table and leaving Mutti again in a delicate position.

On 20 March 2012, Palermo announced former Italian international player Christian Panucci as the team's new team manager. This was preceded by weeks of speculation surrounding future potential investments of Arab entrepreneurs in the club, a move that was confirmed as possible by Zamparini himself between February and March. Palermo's first away win of the season finally came on 1 April, as the rosanero achieved a 3–1 victory at Stadio Renato Dall'Ara against former coach Pioli's Bologna, thus ending an 11-month winless streak. However, Palermo kept struggling in the final part of the season, and did not secure their Serie A place for the following season until the 36th matchday, doing so despite a 2–0 defeat at the hands of Napoli.

On 24 April 2012, it was confirmed Christian Panucci had resigned from his non-playing role after only one month, due to a strained relationship with chairman and owner Maurizio Zamparini.

=== Confirmed summer transfer market bids ===
In

—	DF	CHI	Carlos Labrín (from Huachipato, €1.3M)
—	DF	ITA	Eros Pisano (from Varese, €1.85M)
—	MF	ISR	Eran Zahavi (from Hapoel Tel Aviv, €1.675M)
—	MF	HUN	Ádám Simon (from Szombathelyi Haladás, €0.98M)
—	DF	ARG	Mauro Cetto (from Toulouse, end of contract, €0.45M)
—	MF	ITA	Luca Di Matteo (from Vicenza, co-ownership resolution)
—	MF	ITA	Gianluca Di Chiara (from Reggiana, co-ownership, €0.14M)
—	DF	ITA	Andrea Mantovani (from Chievo, €3.5M)
—	MF	URU	Ignacio Lores (from Defensor Sporting, €2.8M)
—	GK	ITA	Alessandro Micai (free transfer, from Varese, €35K)
—	MF	ITA	Andrea Barberis (on loan from Varese)
—	MF	ITA	Pasquale De Vita (on loan from Atalanta)
—	DF	ITA	Alexander Caputo (from Rosignano, €50K)
—	DF	ARG	Matías Silvestre (from Catania, €7.3M)
—	FW	SUI	Cephas Malele (from Zürich, €0.9M)
—	DF	SRB	Jevrem Kosnić (from Bežanija)
—	MF	PAR	Óscar Nery Arzamendia (from Club Nacional)
—	FW	PAR	César Verdún Servin (from Club Nacional)
—	MF	PAR	Roger Miller Rojas (from Club Nacional)
—	DF	URU	Matías Aguirregaray, €0.25M (on loan from Wanderers)
—	GK	GRE	Alexandros Tzorvas (from Panathinaikos, €0.7M)
—	MF	HON	Edgar Álvarez (from Bari, €0.7M)
—	MF	PAR	Édgar Barreto (from Atalanta, €5.3M)
—	MF	ITA	Francesco Della Rocca (from Bologna, €3.5M)
—	DF	ITA	Luca Piscopo (from Napoli)

Out

—	MF	ITA	Fabio Liverani (end of contract)
—	MF	ITA	Francesco Ardizzone (to Reggiana, co-ownership)
—	DF	ITA	Adriano Siragusa (to Reggiana)
—	DF	ITA	Emanuele Terranova (to Sassuolo, €0.4M)
—	GK	ITA	Mattia Migani (to San Marino, co-ownership)
—	FW	ITA	Dario Maltese (to Viareggio, co-ownership)
—	DF	POL	Kamil Glik (to Torino, co-ownership, €0.3M)
—	FW	ALB	Edgar Çani (to Polonia Warszawa)
—	MF	ITA	Guido Davì (to Juve Stabia)
—	DF	ITA	Moris Carrozzieri (released, to Lecce)
—	MF	ITA	Gianni Munari (from Lecce, co-ownership resolution; to Fiorentina, €0.8M)
—	MF	ITA	Roberto Guana (to Cesena)
—	DF	ROU	Dorin Goian (to Rangers, €0.5M)
—	MF	SUI	Pajtim Kasami (to Fulham, €1.6M)
—	DF	ITA	Samuele Romeo (to Sorrento)
—	GK	ITA	Salvatore Sirigu (to Paris Saint-Germain, €3.9M)
—	MF	ARG	Javier Pastore (to Paris Saint-Germain, €22.8M)
—	FW	ITA	Davide Lanzafame (from Juventus, co-ownership resolution; to Catania, co-ownership, €1M)
—	DF	ITA	Andrea Raggi (to Bologna)
—	MF	ITA	Antonio Nocerino (to Milan, €0.5M)
—	FW	ITA	Davis Curiale (to Triestina)

Out on loan

—	DF	ITA	Daniel Cappelletti (to Sassuolo)
—	MF	ITA	Karim Laribi (to Sassuolo)
—	FW	ITA	Michele Pieri (to San Marino)
—	DF	ITA	Andrea Adamo (to Portogruaro)
—	DF	ITA	Matteo Darmian (to Torino)
—	DF	ARG	Santiago García (to Novara)
—	MF	SVN	Jasmin Kurtić (to Varese)
—	DF	SVN	Siniša Anđelković (to Ascoli)
—	MF	BRA	João Pedro (to Peñarol)
—	DF	ITA	Cesare Bovo (to Genoa, €0.2M)
—	DF	ITA	Mattia Cassani (to Fiorentina, €2M)
—	FW	ARG	Pablo González (from Novara, €5M; to Siena, €0.1M)
—	FW	ITA	Davide Succi (to Padova)
—	MF	ROU	Cristian Melinte (to Petrolul Ploiești)
—	DF	ITA	Gianmarco Corsino (to Ebolitana)
—	FW	ITA	Umberto Nappello (to Monza)
—	DF	ITA	Francesco Mirko Velardi (to Monza)
—	DF	SRB	Milan Milanović (from Lokomotiv Moscow, free transfer, €1.77M; to Siena)
—	DF	CHI	Carlos Labrín (from Huachipato, €1.3M; to Novara)

=== Confirmed winter transfer market bids ===
In

—	MF	ARG	Franco Vázquez (from Belgrano)
—	FW	SWE	Agon Mehmeti (from Malmö FF)
—	DF	SRB	Milan Milanović (loan return from Siena)
—	DF	CHI	Carlos Labrín (loan return from Novara)
—	GK	ITA	Emiliano Viviano (from Inter, co-ownership)
—	MF	ITA	Massimo Donati (from Bari)
—	MF	ITA	Nicolas Viola (from Reggina, co-ownership)

Out

—	GK	BRA	Rubinho (released)
—	DF	ITA	Fabio Piscopo (loan return to Napoli)

Out on loan

—	DF	ITA	Daniel Cappelletti (loan return from Sassuolo, to Juve Stabia)
—	GK	ITA	Francesco Benussi (to Torino)
—	MF	HUN	Ádám Simon (to Bari)
—	FW	CHI	Mauricio Pinilla (to Cagliari)
—	DF	ARG	Mauro Cetto (to Lille)
—	MF	ITA	Luca Di Matteo (to Lecce)
—	MF	ITA	Nicolas Viola (to Reggina)

== Squad information ==
Updated 25 March 2012

No.	Pos	Nat	Player	Total		Serie A		Europa League		Coppa Italia	
No.	Pos	Nat	Player	Apps	Goals	Apps	Goals	Apps	Goals	Apps	Goals
1	GK	(Italy) ITA	Emiliano Viviano	18	-32	18	-32	0	0	0	0
12	GK	(Italy) ITA	Giacomo Brichetto	1	-2	0	0	0	0	1	-2
33	GK	(Greece) GRE	Alexandros Tzorvas	12	-17	11	-15	0	0	1	-2
61	GK	(Italy) ITA	Alessandro Micai	0	0	0	0	0	0	0	0
2	DF	(Italy) ITA	Andrea Mantovani	25	2	22	2	2	0	1	0
3	DF	(Argentina) ARG	Matías Silvestre	28	4	28	4	0	0	0	0
6	DF	(Argentina) ARG	Ezequiel Muñoz	20	1	18	1	2	0	0	0
13	DF	(Uruguay) URU	Matías Aguirregaray	12	0	11	0	0	0	1	0
15	DF	(Serbia) SRB	Milan Milanović	4	0	4	0	0	0	0	0
18	DF	(Chile) CHI	Carlos Labrín	8	0	8	0	0	0	0	0
31	DF	(Italy) ITA	Eros Pisano	26	0	26	0	0	0	0	0
42	DF	(Italy) ITA	Federico Balzaretti	28	0	26	0	2	0	0	0
55	DF	(Italy) ITA	Luigi Silvestri	0	0	0	0	0	0	0	0
95	DF	(Italy) ITA	Giuseppe Prestia	0	0	0	0	0	0	0	0
5	MF	(Paraguay) PAR	Édgar Barreto	33	1	33	1	0	0	0	0
7	MF	(Italy) ITA	Francesco Della Rocca	22	0	21	0	0	0	1	0
8	MF	(Italy) ITA	Giulio Migliaccio	31	2	28	2	2	0	1	0
14	MF	(Argentina) ARG	Nicolás Bertolo	27	4	25	3	1	0	1	1
16	MF	(Israel) ISR	Eran Zahavi	21	2	19	2	2	0	0	0
17	MF	(Argentina) ARG	Franco Vázquez	12	0	12	0	0	0	0	0
20	MF	(Ghana) GHA	Afriyie Acquah	23	0	20	0	2	0	1	0
21	MF	(Slovenia) SVN	Armin Bačinović	14	0	13	0	1	0	0	0
23	MF	(Italy) ITA	Massimo Donati	17	1	17	1	0	0	0	0
26	MF	(Uruguay) URU	Ignacio Lores	6	0	5	0	0	0	1	0
27	MF	(Slovenia) SVN	Josip Iličić	36	7	33	3	2	1	1	3
53	MF	(Italy) ITA	Andrea Barberis	0	0	0	0	0	0	0	0
90	MF	(Honduras) HON	Edgar Álvarez	9	0	8	0	0	0	1	0
10	FW	(Italy) ITA	Fabrizio Miccoli (captain)	29	14	27	13	2	1	0	0
11	FW	(Uruguay) URU	Abel Hernández	19	6	19	6	0	0	0	0
19	FW	(Croatia) CRO	Igor Budan	21	7	20	7	0	0	1	0
24	FW	(Sweden) SWE	Agon Mehmeti	2	0	2	0	0	0	0	0
58	FW	(Italy) ITA	Mauro Bollino	1	0	0	0	0	0	1	0
Players sold or loaned out during the summer transfer market:
5	DF	(Italy) ITA	Cesare Bovo	2	0	0	0	2	0	0	0
16	DF	(Italy) ITA	Mattia Cassani	2	0	0	0	2	0	0	0
23	MF	(Italy) ITA	Antonio Nocerino	2	0	0	0	2	0	0	0
19	FW	(Argentina) ARG	Pablo González	1	1	0	0	1	1	0	0
Players sold or loaned out during the winter transfer market:
99	GK	(Italy) ITA	Francesco Benussi	9	-12	7	-9	2	-3	0	0
4	DF	(Argentina) ARG	Mauro Cetto	8	0	7	0	0	0	1	0
22	MF	(Italy) ITA	Luca Di Matteo	0	0	0	0	0	0	0	0
30	MF	(Hungary) HUN	Ádám Simon	0	0	0	0	0	0	0	0
51	FW	(Chile) CHI	Mauricio Pinilla	14	2	13	2	1	0	0	0

== Match results ==
=== Legend ===
Win	Draw	Loss

=== Pre-season friendlies ===
Win Draw Loss

9 July 2011 Friendly	Palermo (Italy)	18–0	(Italy) Vinschgau selection	Vinschgau
17:00 CEST	7' Migliaccio; 19', 33', 41' Miccoli; 23', 37', 45' Zahavi; 34' González; 56', 80', 89' Pinilla; 61' Nocerino; 63' Pisano; 71' Iličić; 77' Bovo; 79' (o.g.) Metzs; 86' Goian	Report		Stadium: Mals; Referee: Volpato di Merano
Note: Match of 45' minutes

12 July 2011 Friendly	Palermo (Italy)	7–1	(Italy) South Tyrolean selection	Vinschgau
17:00 CEST	13' Muñoz; 36' Pinilla; 41' Balzaretti; 61', 64' Miccoli; 66' Iličić; 90' Anđelković	Report	Stecher 90+1'	Stadium: Mals; Referee: Detta

16 July 2011 Friendly	Palermo (Italy)	2–0	(United Arab Emirates) Al Ain S.C.C.	Brixen
17:00 CEST	14' Miccoli; 60' Migliaccio	Report		Stadium: Stadio Comunale; Referee: Zuliani

16 July 2011 Friendly	Brixen selection (Italy)	1–4	(Italy) Palermo	Brixen
20:00 CET	8' Priller	Report	Bertolo 2'; Pinilla 13', 15', 37'	Stadium: Stadio Comunale; Referee: Zuliani

19 July 2011 Friendly	Palermo (Italy)	18–0	(Italy) Oltrisarco	Vinschgau
17:00 CET	3', 20' João Pedro; 5', 33', 53' Bertolo; 11', 23', 42', 66' González; 30' Anđelković; 44', 90' Bačinović; 51' Simon; 73', 77', 87' Pinilla; 61' Acquah; 82' Miccoli	Report		Stadium: Mals; Referee: Paolo (Modena)

20 July 2011 Friendly	Palermo (Italy)	3–1	(Italy) Siena	Brixen
20:00 CEST	37' Pinilla; 45+1' Mantovani; 60' Zahavi	Report	Reginaldo 18'	Stadium: Stadio Comunale; Attendance: >1,000; Referee: Alessandro Caso

25 July 2011 Friendly	Palermo (Italy)	8–0	(Italy) Monreale	Palermo
17:00 CEST	Pisano; Miccoli; Zahavi; Cassani; Bertolo (o.g.) Monreale	Report		Stadium: Campo Tenente Onorato

12 August 2011 Friendly	Palermo (Italy)	9–0	(Italy) Palermo B	Palermo
17:00 CEST	González; Acquah; Bertolo; Hernández	Report		Stadium: Campo Tenente Onorato

18 August 2011 Friendly	Trapani (Italy)	3–5	(Italy) Palermo	Trapani
17:30 CEST	8' Gambino; 65' Barracco; 71' Filippi	Report	30', 40' Miccoli; 57', 71' Hernández; 68' Iličić	Stadium: Stadio Polisportivo Provinciale; Attendance: 7.000; Referee: Michele Gallo di Barcellona Pozzo di Gotto

21 August 2011 Friendly	Palermo (Italy)	2–3	(Turkey) Fenerbahçe	Palermo
20:45 CEST		Report		Stadium: Stadio Renzo Barbera; Attendance: 7.456; Referee: Gianpaolo Calvarese

21 August 2011 Friendly	Napoli (Italy)	3–1	(Italy) Palermo	Naples
22:00 CEST	19' Hamšík; 30', 67' Maggio	Report	44' Migliaccio	Stadium: San Paolo; Attendance: 65.240; Referee: Baratta

=== Serie A ===
Pos	Team	Pld	W	D	L	GF	GA	GD	Pts	Qualification or relegation
14	Siena	38	11	11	16	45	45	0	44	
15	Cagliari	38	10	13	15	37	46	−9	43 (Note: Cagliari finished ahead of Palermo on goal difference : Cagliari 2–1 Palermo, Palermo 3–2 Cagliari; Cagliari = –9, Palermo = –10.)	
16	Palermo	38	11	10	17	52	62	−10	43	
17	Genoa	38	11	9	18	50	69	−19	42	
18	Lecce (R, D, R)	38	8	12	18	40	56	−16	36	Relegation to Serie C1 (Note: Lecce were originally relegated to Serie B, but further relegated to Lega Pro Prima Divisione due to involvement in the 2011–12 Italian football scandal.)

Source: Lega Serie A
Rules for classification: 1) points; 2) head-to-head points; 3) head-to-head goal difference; 4) head-to-head goals scored; 5) goal difference; 6) number of goals scored
(D) Disqualified; (R) Relegated
Notes:

Date and time	Opponent	Venue	Result	Scorers	Attendance	Report
11 September 2011 – 20:45	Internazionale	Home	Won 4–3	Miccoli, Hernández, Miccoli, Pinilla	20,795	1, 2
18 September 2011 – 12:30	Atalanta	Away	Lost 0–1		~ 20,000	1, 2
21 September 2011 – 20:45	Cagliari	Home	Won 3–2	Zahavi, Bertolo, Miccoli	18,965	1, 2
25 September 2011 – 15:00	Lazio	Away	Drew 0–0		?	1, 2
2 October 2011 – 15:00	Siena	Home	Won 2–0	Migliaccio, Hernández		1, 2
15 October 2011 – 20:45	Milan	Away	Lost 0–3		47,765	1, 2
23 October 2011 – 15:00	Roma	Away	Lost 0–1		~ 35,000	1, 2
27 October 2011 – 20:45	Lecce	Home	Won 2–0	Pinilla, Hernández	19,730	1, 2
30 October 2011 – 15:00	Udinese	Away	Lost 0–1		~ 20,000	1, 2
5 November 2011 – 18:00	Bologna	Home	Won 3–1	Zahavi, Silvestre, Iličić	18,507	1, 2
20 November 2011 – 15:00	Juventus	Away	Lost 0–3		~ 40,000	1, 2
27 November 2011 – 15:00	Fiorentina	Home	Won 2–0	Miccoli, Iličić	19,536	1, 2
4 December 2011 – 20:45	Parma	Away	Drew 0–0		11,815	1, 2
10 December 2011 – 20:45	Cesena	Home	Lost 0–1		18,474	1, 2
18 December 2011 – 15:00	Catania	Away	Lost 0–2		16,471	1, 2
21 December 2011 – 20:45	Novara	Away	Drew 2–2	Ludi (og), Bertolo	8,392	1, 2
8 January 2012 – 20:45	Napoli	Home	Lost 1–3	Miccoli	22,110	1, 2
15 January 2012 – 15:00	Chievo	Away	Lost 0–1		~10,000	1, 2
22 January 2012 – 15:00	Genoa	Home	Won 5–3	Budan, Silvestre, Mantovani, Miccoli, Migliaccio	15,658	1, 2
29 January 2012 – 15:00	Novara	Home	Won 2–0	Budan (2)	16,224	1, 2
1 February 2012 – 20:45	Internazionale	Away	Drew 4–4	Mantovani, Miccoli (3)	18,320	1, 2
5 February 2012 – 15:00	Atalanta	Home	Won 2–1	Miccoli, Budan	15,320	1, 2
12 February 2012 – 15:00	Cagliari	Away	Lost 1–2	Hernández	?	1, 2
19 February 2012 – 15:00	Lazio	Home	Won 5–1	Barreto, Donati, Silvestre, Budan, Miccoli	18,364	1, 2
26 February 2012 – 15:00	Siena	Away	Lost 1–4	Budan	?	1, 2
3 March 2012 – 18:00	Milan	Home	Lost 0–4		22,246	1, 2
10 March 2012 – 20:45	Roma	Home	Lost 0–1		16,451	1, 2
18 March 2012 – 15:00	Lecce	Away	Drew 1–1	Muñoz	~10,000	1, 2
24 March 2012 – 20:45	Udinese	Home	Drew 1–1	Miccoli	17,918	1, 2
1 April 2012 – 15:00	Bologna	Away	Won 3–1	Donati, Hernández, Morleo (o.g.)	?	1, 2
7 April 2012 – 15:00	Juventus	Home	Lost 0–2		28,941	1, 2
11 April 2012 – 20:45	Fiorentina	Away	Drew 0–0		~ 20,000	1, 2
22 April 2012 – 15:00	Cesena	Away	Drew 2–2	Bertolo, Silvestre	~ 8,000	1, 2
25 April 2012 – 15:00	Parma	Home	Lost 1–2	Hernández	14,365	1, 2
28 April 2012 – 18:00	Catania	Home	Drew 1–1	Miccoli	18,462	1, 2
1 May 2012 – 20:45	Napoli	Away	Lost 0–2		41.397	1, 2
6 May 2012 – 15:00	Chievo	Home	Drew 4–4	Miccoli (3), Silvestre	22.617	
13 May 2012 – 20:45	Genoa	Away	Lost 0-2		Closed Doors	

=== UEFA Europa League ===
Date and time	Round	Opponent	Venue	Result	Scorers	Attendance	Report
28 July 2011 – 20:30	3rd Preliminary Round – 1st Leg	(Switzerland) Thun	Home	Drew 2–2	Iličić, Miccoli		
4 August 2011 – 19:30	3rd Preliminary Round – 2nd Leg	(Switzerland) Thun	Away	Drew 1–1	González		

=== Coppa Italia ===
Date and time	Round	Opponent	Venue	Result	Scorers	Attendance	Report
13 December 2011 – 21:00	Round of 16	Siena	Home	Lost 4–4 (0-3 p)	Iličić (3), Bertolo	6,489	1, 2
