= 2008–09 US Lecce season =

U.S. Lecce
2008–09 season
- Chairman: Giovanni Semeraro
- Head coach: Mario Beretta; Luigi De Canio
- Stadium: Stadio Via del Mare
- Serie A: 20th (relegated)
- Coppa Italia: Third round
- Top goalscorer: League: Simone Tiribocchi (11); All: Simone Tiribocchi (11)
- Highest home attendance: 29,658
- Lowest home attendance: 6,100
- Average home league attendance: 11,867
| Home colours | Away colours | Third colours |

The 2008–09 season was the 91st season in the history of U.S. Lecce and the club's first season back in the top flight of Italian football. In addition to the domestic league, Lecce participated in this season's edition of the Coppa Italia. The season covered the period from 1 July 2008 to 30 June 2009.

== Players ==
=== First-team squad ===
Note: Flags indicate national team as defined under FIFA eligibility rules; some limited exceptions apply. Players may hold more than one non-FIFA nationality.

| No. | Pos. | Nation | Player |
|---|---|---|---|
| 1 | GK | ITA | Antonio Rosati |
| 2 | DF | ITA | Guglielmo Stendardo (on loan from Lazio) |
| 3 | DF | ITA | Tiziano Polenghi |
| 4 | MF | BRA | Edinho |
| 6 | DF | BRA | Ângelo |
| 7 | MF | ITA | Andrea Zanchetta (captain) |
| 8 | MF | ITA | Gianni Munari |
| 9 | FW | ITA | Daniele Cacia |
| 10 | MF | ITA | Fabio Caserta |
| 11 | FW | ARG | José Ignacio Castillo |
| 14 | DF | BRA | Fabiano |
| 15 | DF | FRA | Hemza Mihoubi |
| 16 | DF | ITA | Andrea Esposito |
| 18 | MF | URU | Guillermo Giacomazzi |

| No. | Pos. | Nation | Player |
|---|---|---|---|
| 19 | MF | ITA | Luca Ariatti |
| 20 | MF | ITA | Giuseppe Vives |
| 21 | MF | ITA | Andrea Ardito |
| 22 | GK | ITA | Davide Petrachi |
| 23 | DF | ITA | Raffaele Schiavi |
| 24 | MF | PAR | Daniel Raschle |
| 25 | FW | CIV | Axel Cédric Konan |
| 26 | FW | FRA | Mario Janvier (from youth team) |
| 27 | MF | ITA | Cristian Agnelli |
| 28 | DF | SWE | André Möllestam (from youth team) |
| 30 | DF | POR | Vitorino Antunes (on loan from Roma) |
| 35 | FW | SEN | Papa Waigo (on loan from Fiorentina) |
| 37 | FW | PAR | Jorge Ortega |
| 40 | DF | ITA | Alberto Giuliatto |
| 41 | DF | ITA | Gianmarco Ingrosso (from youth team) |
| 77 | MF | SRB | Dušan Basta |
| 81 | FW | GRE | Dimitrios Papadopoulos |
| 90 | FW | ITA | Simone Tiribocchi |
| 99 | GK | ITA | Francesco Benussi |
| — | MF | SUI | Gianluca Frontino (on loan from Grasshopper) |

== Competitions ==
=== Overall record ===
| Competition | First match | Last match | Starting round | Final position | Record | | | | | | | |
| Competition | First match | Last match | Starting round | Final position | Pld | W | D | L | GF | GA | GD | Win % |
|---|---|---|---|---|---|---|---|---|---|---|---|---|
| Serie A | August 2008 | 31 May 2009 | Matchday 1 | 20th | 38 | 5 | 15 | 18 | 37 | 67 | −30 | 13.16 |
| Coppa Italia | 23 August 2008 | 23 August 2008 | Third round | Third round | 1 | 0 | 0 | 1 | 0 | 1 | −1 | 0.00 |
| Total | | | | | 39 | 5 | 15 | 19 | 37 | 68 | −31 | 12.82 |

Source: Soccerway

=== Serie A ===
==== League table ====
| Pos | Team | Pld | W | D | L | GF | GA | GD | Pts | Qualification or relegation |
|---|---|---|---|---|---|---|---|---|---|---|
| 16 | Chievo | 38 | 8 | 14 | 16 | 35 | 49 | −14 | 38 | |
| 17 | Bologna | 38 | 9 | 10 | 19 | 43 | 62 | −19 | 37 | |
| 18 | Torino (R) | 38 | 8 | 10 | 20 | 37 | 61 | −24 | 34 | Relegation to Serie B |
| 19 | Reggina (R) | 38 | 6 | 13 | 19 | 30 | 62 | −32 | 31 | Relegation to Serie B |
| 20 | Lecce (R) | 38 | 5 | 15 | 18 | 37 | 67 | −30 | 30 | Relegation to Serie B |

Source: lega-calcio.it (in Italian)
Rules for classification: 1) points; 2) head-to-head points; 3) head-to-head goal difference; 4) head-to-head goals scored; 5) goal difference; 6) number of goals scored.
(R) Relegated

==== Results summary ====
| Overall | | | | | | | | Home | | | | | | Away | | | | | |
| Pld | W | D | L | GF | GA | GD | Pts | W | D | L | GF | GA | GD | W | D | L | GF | GA | GD |
|---|---|---|---|---|---|---|---|---|---|---|---|---|---|---|---|---|---|---|---|
| 38 | 5 | 15 | 18 | 37 | 67 | −30 | 30 | 3 | 10 | 6 | 20 | 28 | −8 | 2 | 5 | 12 | 17 | 39 | −22 |

Source: Serie A

==== Results by round ====
| Round | 1 | 2 | 3 | 4 | 5 | 6 | 7 | 8 | 9 | 10 | 11 | 12 | 13 | 14 | 15 | 16 | 17 | 18 | 19 | 20 | 21 | 22 | 23 | 24 | 25 | 26 | 27 | 28 | 29 | 30 | 31 | 32 | 33 | 34 | 35 | 36 | 37 | 38 |
|---|---|---|---|---|---|---|---|---|---|---|---|---|---|---|---|---|---|---|---|---|---|---|---|---|---|---|---|---|---|---|---|---|---|---|---|---|---|---|
| Ground | A | H | H | A | H | A | H | A | H | A | H | A | H | A | H | A | H | A | H | H | A | A | H | A | H | A | H | A | H | A | H | A | H | A | H | A | H | A |
| Result | L | W | D | L | W | D | D | L | D | D | D | L | L | D | L | L | D | W | L | D | D | W | L | L | L | L | D | L | D | L | L | L | W | D | D | L | D | L |
| Position | 18 | 12 | 12 | 15 | 11 | 13 | 11 | 13 | 12 | 13 | 12 | 16 | 17 | 16 | 16 | 17 | 18 | 16 | 17 | 17 | 17 | 16 | 17 | 17 | 18 | 19 | 19 | 19 | 19 | 19 | 19 | 19 | 19 | 19 | 19 | 20 | 19 | 20 |

Source: Serie A
A = Away; H = Home; W = Win; D = Draw; L = Loss

==== Matches ====
| 31 August 2008 1 | Torino | 3–0 | Lecce | Turin |
| 15:00 CEST (UTC+2) | | | | Stadium: Stadio Olimpico Grande Torino; Referee: Andrea Gervasoni |

| 14 September 2008 2 | Lecce | 2–0 | Chievo | Lecce |
| 15:00 CEST (UTC+2) | | | | Stadium: Stadio Via del Mare; Referee: Paolo Mazzoleni |

| 21 September 2008 3 | Lecce | 1–1 | Siena | Lecce |
| 15:00 CEST (UTC+2) | | | | Stadium: Stadio Via del Mare; Referee: Andrea Romeo |

| 24 September 2008 4 | Internazionale | 1–0 | Lecce | Milan |
| 20:30 CEST (UTC+2) | | | | Stadium: San Siro; Referee: Mauro Bergonzi |

| 28 September 2008 5 | Lecce | 2–0 | Cagliari | Lecce |
| 15:00 CEST (UTC+2) | | | | Stadium: Stadio Via del Mare; Referee: Riccardo Pinzani |

| 4 October 2008 6 | Lazio | 1–1 | Lecce | Rome |
| 18:00 CEST (UTC+2) | | | | Stadium: Stadio Olimpico; Referee: Nicola Pierpaoli |

| 19 October 2008 7 | Lecce | 2–2 | Udinese | Lecce |
| 15:00 CEST (UTC+2) | | | | Stadium: Stadio Via del Mare; Referee: Andrea Gervasoni |

| 26 October 2008 8 | Reggina | 2–0 | Lecce | Reggio Calabria |
| 15:00 CEST (UTC+2) | | | | Stadium: Stadio Oreste Granillo; Referee: Carmine Russo |

| 29 October 2008 9 | Lecce | 1–1 | Palermo | Lecce |
| 20:30 CEST (UTC+2) | | | | Stadium: Stadio Via del Mare; Referee: Dino Tommasi |

| 2 November 2008 10 | Atalanta | 0–0 | Lecce | Bergamo |
| 15:00 CEST (UTC+2) | | | | Stadium: Stadio Atleti Azzurri d'Italia; Referee: Luca Marelli |

| 9 November 2008 11 | Lecce | 1–1 | Milan | Lecce |
| 20:30 CEST (UTC+2) | | | | Stadium: Stadio Via del Mare; Referee: Mauro Bergonzi |

| 16 November 2008 12 | Sampdoria | 3–2 | Lecce | Genoa |
| 15:00 CEST (UTC+2) | | | | Stadium: Stadio Luigi Ferraris; Referee: Matteo Trefoloni |

| 23 November 2008 13 | Lecce | 0–3 | Roma | Lecce |
| 15:00 CEST (UTC+2) | | | | Stadium: Stadio Via del Mare; Referee: Andrea Gervasoni |

| 29 November 2008 14 | Catania | 1–1 | Lecce | Catania |
| 18:00 CEST (UTC+2) | | | | Stadium: Stadio Angelo Massimino; Referee: Paolo Dondarini |

| 7 December 2008 15 | Lecce | 1–2 | Juventus | Lecce |
| 15:00 CEST (UTC+2) | | | | Stadium: Stadio Via del Mare; Referee: Nicola Pierpaoli |

| 13 December 2008 16 | Napoli | 3–0 | Lecce | Naples |
| 20:30 CEST (UTC+2) | Hamšík 11' (pen.); Pazienza 42'; Denis 65' | | | Stadium: Stadio San Paolo; Referee: Paolo Valeri |

| 21 December 2008 17 | Lecce | 0–0 | Bologna | Lecce |
| 15:00 CEST (UTC+2) | | | | Stadium: Stadio Via del Mare; Referee: Emidio Morganti |

| 11 January 2009 18 | Fiorentina | 1–2 | Lecce | Florence |
| 15:00 CEST (UTC+2) | | | | Stadium: Stadio Artemio Franchi; Referee: Paolo Mazzoleni |

| 18 January 2009 19 | Lecce | 0–2 | Genoa | Lecce |
| 15:00 CEST (UTC+2) | | | | Stadium: Stadio Via del Mare; Referee: Riccardo Pinzani |

| 25 January 2009 20 | Lecce | 3–3 | Torino | Lecce |
| 15:00 CEST (UTC+2) | | | | Stadium: Stadio Via del Mare; Referee: Matteo Trefoloni |

| 28 January 2009 21 | Chievo | 1–1 | Lecce | Verona |

| 1 February 2009 22 | Siena | 1–2 | Lecce | Siena |

| 7 February 2009 23 | Lecce | 0–3 | Internazionale | Lecce |
| | | | | Stadium: Stadio Via del Mare |

| 15 February 2009 24 | Cagliari | 2–0 | Lecce | Cagliari |

| 22 February 2009 25 | Lecce | 0–2 | Lazio | Lecce |
| | | | | Stadium: Stadio Via del Mare |

| 1 March 2009 26 | Udinese | 2–0 | Lecce | Udinese |

| 8 March 2009 27 | Lecce | 0–0 | Reggina | Lecce |
| | | | | Stadium: Stadio Via del Mare |

| 15 March 2009 28 | Palermo | 5–2 | Lecce | Palermo |

| 22 March 2009 29 | Lecce | 2–2 | Atalanta | Lecce |
| | | | | Stadium: Stadio Via del Mare |

| 5 April 2009 30 | Milan | 2–0 | Lecce | Milan |

| 11 April 2009 31 | Lecce | 1–3 | Sampdoria | Lecce |
| | | | | Stadium: Stadio Via del Mare |

| 19 April 2009 32 | Roma | 3–2 | Lecce | Rome |

| 26 April 2009 33 | Lecce | 2–1 | Catania | Lecce |
| | | | | Stadium: Stadio Via del Mare |

| 3 May 2009 34 | Juventus | 2–2 | Lecce | Turin |

| 10 May 2009 35 | Lecce | 1–1 | Napoli | Lecce |
| | | | | Stadium: Stadio Via del Mare |

| 17 May 2009 36 | Bologna | 2–1 | Lecce | Bologna |

| 24 May 2009 37 | Lecce | 1–1 | Fiorentina | Lecce |
| | | | | Stadium: Stadio Via del Mare |

| 31 May 2009 38 | Genoa | 4–1 | Lecce | Genoa |

=== Coppa Italia ===
| 23 August 2008 Third round | Lecce | 0–1 | Salernitana | Lecce |
| CEST (UTC+2) | | | | Stadium: Stadio Via del Mare |
