= Pesoli =

Pesoli is a surname. Notable people with the surname include:

- Emanuele Pesoli (born 1980), Italian footballer
- Stefano Pesoli (born 1984), Italian footballer
