= Francesco Benussi =

Italian footballer (born 1981)

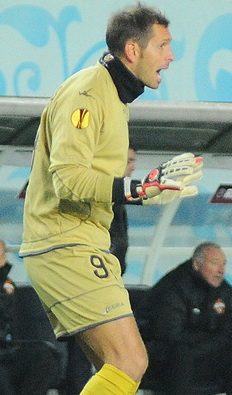

Personal information
- Date of birth: 15 October 1981 (age 45)
- Place of birth: Mestre, Italy
- Height: 1.89 m (6 ft 2 in)
- Position: Goalkeeper

Youth career
- 1998–1999: Venezia

Senior career*
Years	Team	Apps	(Gls)
1999–2005	Venezia	55	(0)
2000–2001	→ Lumezzane (loan)	18	(0)
2001–2002	→ Ascoli (loan)	2	(0)
2003	→ Arezzo (loan)	14	(0)
2005–2010	Lecce	93	(0)
2007	→ Siena (loan)	0	(0)
2009–2010	→ Livorno (loan)	5	(0)
2010–2013	Palermo	13	(0)
2012	→ Torino (loan)	18	(0)
2013–2014	Udinese	0	(0)
2014–2015	Verona	16	(0)
2015–2016	Carpi	4	(0)
2016–2017	Vicenza	37	(0)
Total		275	(0)

International career
1999–2000	Italy U18	6	(0)
2000–2001	Italy U20	3	(0)
- * Club domestic league appearances and goals

Francesco Benussi (born 15 October 1981) is a retired Italian footballer who played as a goalkeeper.

== Club career ==
=== Venezia ===
Benussi started his career at Venezia, After he made his team debut in 1999–2000 season. He was loaned to Serie C1 clubs likes Lumezzane and Ascoli. After played as a backup of Giovanni Indiveri, he returned to Venice and played as a backup of Salvatore Soviero before left on loan again for Arezzo of Serie C1. Benussi became first choice after Soviero departed for Reggina.

=== Lecce ===
After Venezia bankruptcy and relegated, Benussi was signed by Lecce, as first a backup to Vincenzo Sicignano in August 2005. But due to injury of Sicignano, he played 15 Serie A games. Lecce failed to protect her place in Serie A, and saw Sicignano left the club. Benussi became the first choice at the start of 2004–05 season, before left on loan to A.C. Siena as player exchange with Nicola Pavarini. At Siena, he failed to challenge Alex Manninger for the first choice, and Siena has not decided to bought Benussi outright.

Returned to Lecce for another Serie B season, his first choice place was challenged by Antonio Rosati but Benussi played 23 Serie B games and all 4 promotion playoffs, to win promotion for the Apulia club in June 2008.

=== Livorno ===
On 12 August 2009 Livorno have signed the goalkeeper on loan from U.S. Lecce. He played as an unused substitute on 9 August, in the Coppa Italia match that Lecce won 4–0 over Vico Equense.

On 25 October 2009, he played his first match for Livorno, substituted Nico Pulzetti after goalkeeper Alfonso De Lucia was sent off. He played as starter in the subsequent 3 league matches and 2 Coppa Italia games.

=== Palermo and loan to Torino ===
On 1 February 2010 Benussi agreed for a loan transfer to Palermo, with Rubinho making the opposite move, reunited with former Venezia owner Maurizio Zamparini. After Palermo signed Giacomo Brichetto permanently, Benussi also signed permanently from Lecce a week later, on 22 July 2010. He signed a 3-year contract.

Constantly a second choice behind Italian international Salvatore Sirigu, Benussi has since played only at UEFA Europa League level during his period while at Palermo. Initially confirmed as second goalkeeper following the departure of Sirigu to Paris Saint-Germain F.C. and the signing of Greek international Alexandros Tzorvas as a replacement, he successively became the first choice under new head coaches Devis Mangia and Bortolo Mutti. Following the acquisition of Italy international Emiliano Viviano, Palermo opted to send Benussi on loan to Torino in the Serie B league.

=== Udinese ===
On 24 July 2013, his contract with Palermo was cancelled and he moved to Udinese.

=== Verona ===
On 30 August 2014 Benussi was signed by Hellas Verona F.C.

=== Carpi ===
On 9 July 2015 Benussi was signed by Serie A newcomer Carpi F.C. 1909. On 27 January 2016 Benussi was released.

=== Vicenza ===
Benussi joined Vicenza Calcio in a 1 1/2-year contract on 27 January 2016 on a free transfer. He received no.1 shirt from departing Richard Marcone.

== International career ==
Benussi has been capped for the Italy U20 side in 2000 at the Toulon Tournament, behind Generoso Rossi as 2nd choice goalkeeper. He played once at the tournament.

== Career statistics ==
=== Club ===
Appearances and goals by club, season and competition
Club	Season	League			Cup		Europe		Other		Total	
Club	Season	Division	Apps	Goals	Apps	Goals	Apps	Goals	Apps	Goals	Apps	Goals
Venezia	1999–2000	Serie A	7	0	1	0	—		—		8	0
Venezia	2002–03	Serie B	3	0	2	0	—		—		5	0
Venezia	2003–04	Serie B	9	0	3	0	—		2	0	14	0
Venezia	2004–05	Serie B	34	0	3	0	—		—		37	0
Venezia	Total		53	0	9	0	—		2	0	64	0
Lumezzane (loan)	2000–01	Serie C1	16	0	—		—		—		16	0
Lumezzane (loan)	2001–02	Serie C1	2	0	3	0	—		—		5	0
Lumezzane (loan)	Total		18	0	3	0	—		—		21	0
Ascoli (loan)	2001–02	Serie C1	2	0	—		—		—		2	0
Arezzo (loan)	2002–03	Serie C1	14	0	—		—		—		14	0
Lecce	2005–06	Serie A	15	0	0	0	—		—		15	0
Lecce	2006–07	Serie B	17	0	1	0	—		—		18	0
Lecce	2007–08	Serie A	23	0	0	0	—		4	0	27	0
Lecce	2008–09	Serie A	34	0	1	0	—		—		35	0
Lecce	Total		89	0	2	0	—		4	0	95	0
Siena (loan)	2006–07	Serie A	0	0	—		—		—		0	0
Livorno (loan)	2009–10	Serie A	5	0	2	0	—		—		7	0
Palermo	2009–10	Serie A	0	0	—		—		—		0	0
Palermo	2010–11	Serie A	1	0	0	0	5	0	—		6	0
Palermo	2011–12	Serie A	7	0	0	0	2	0	—		9	0
Palermo	2012–13	Serie A	5	0	1	0	—		—		6	0
Palermo	Total		13	0	1	0	7	0	—		21	0
Torino (loan)	2011–12	Serie B	18	0	—		—		—		18	0
Udinese	2013–14	Serie A	0	0	0	0	0	0	—		0	0
Verona	2014–15	Serie A	16	0	1	0	—		—		17	0
Carpi	2015–16	Serie A	4	0	1	0	—		—		5	0
Vicenza	2015–16	Serie B	12	0	—		—		—		12	0
Vicenza	2016–17	Serie B	25	0	2	0	—		—		27	0
Vicenza	Total		37	0	2	0	—		—		39	0
Career total			269	0	21	0	7	0	6	0	303	0

== Honours ==
Lecce

- Serie B Third-Place: 2007–08

Ascoli

- Serie C1 Champions: 2001–02
