= Osvaldo Bosso =

Chilean footballer (born 1993)

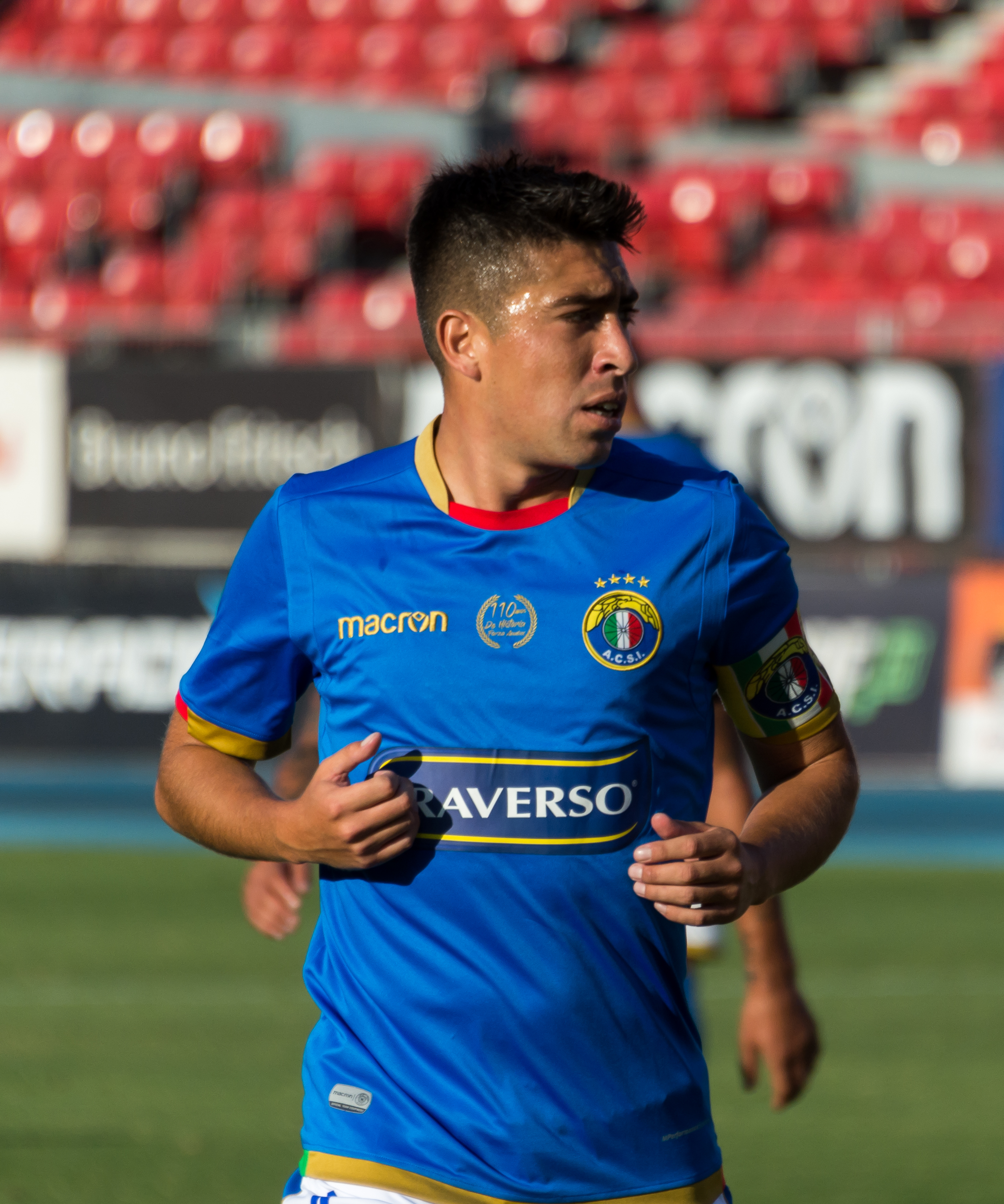

Personal information
- Full name: Osvaldo Javier Bosso Torres
- Date of birth: 14 October 1993 (age 33)
- Place of birth: Santiago, Chile
- Height: 1.73 m (5 ft 8 in)
- Position: Defender

Team information
- Current team: Ñublense

Youth career
- Audax Italiano

Senior career*
Years	Team	Apps	(Gls)
2012–2014	Audax Italiano B	59	(6)
2012–2023	Audax Italiano	230	(7)
2024–	Ñublense	0	(0)
- * Club domestic league appearances and goals as of 10 February 2024

Osvaldo Javier Bosso Torres (born 14 October 1993) is a Chilean footballer that currently plays for Ñublense in the Primera División de Chile.

== Career ==
A product of the Audax Italiano youth system, Bosso played for them until 2023. In 2024, he switched to Ñublense alongside his teammate Carlos Labrín.
