= Alessandro Gazzi =

Italian footballer (born 1983)

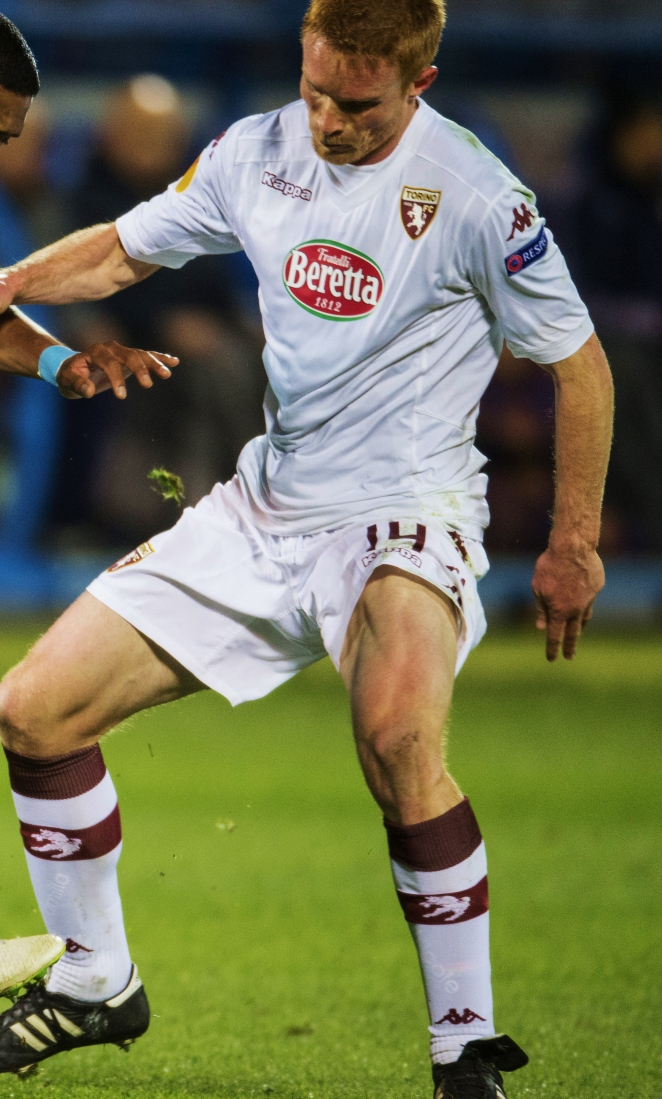
- Gazzi playing for Torino in 2015

Personal information
- Full name: Alessandro Carlo Gazzi
- Date of birth: 28 January 1983 (age 43)
- Place of birth: Feltre, Italy
- Height: 1.83 m (6 ft 0 in)
- Position: Defensive midfielder

Youth career
- 1997–1999: Montebelluna
- 1999–2000: Treviso

Senior career*
Years	Team	Apps	(Gls)
2000–2001	Treviso	2	(0)
2001–2003	→ Lazio (loan)	0	(0)
2003–2004	Viterbese	31	(1)
2004–2011	Bari	225	(6)
2007	→ Reggina (loan)	9	(0)
2011–2012	Siena	33	(1)
2012–2016	Torino	90	(2)
2016–2017	Palermo	26	(0)
2017–2021	Alessandria	99	(0)

International career
2003–2004	Italy U20	3	(0)
- * Club domestic league appearances and goals as of 13:29, 5 July 2020 (UTC)

Alessandro Gazzi (born 28 January 1983) is an Italian former professional footballer who played as a defensive midfielder.

He became an honorary citizen of the city of Reggio Calabria on 27 May 2007.

== Club career ==
=== Early career ===
He began his footballing career at Plavis, the youth team of his region, Santa Giustina. He then transferred to Montebelluna and immediately after to Treviso, with whom he debuted in the Serie B season of 2000–01, at age 17.

In the summer of 2001, he officially joined Lazio on a two-year loan and was given a place in the youth team. He played for the youth team for two seasons, but never played for the first team, and in 2003 returned to Treviso at the end of the loan.

=== Viterbese ===
In August 2003, he was sold outright to Viterbese, at the time led by former coach of Genoa Guido Carboni. He was a regular starter for the side, contesting 31 games, scoring a goal. He played four games in the promotion play-offs to Serie B, which Viterbo lost in the final against Crotone.

At the end of the season, the club was declared bankrupt, and Gazzi and all the players on the team were released on a free transfer.

=== Bari and Reggina ===
In July 2004, he moved definitively to Bari in Serie B, along with his coach and teammates Vincenzo Santoruvo and Lorenzo Sibilano. In his first season in Apulia, he played 34 games and scored 3 goals, contributing to the final placement of 10th in the league standings.

The following year, he took to the field 35 times, scoring 1 goal. On 4 January, he signed an extension until 2009. In the following season he played 11 games, but on the last day of the winter transfer market was sold to Reggina in co-ownership, where for the first time in his career he had the opportunity to play in Serie A. He made his debut in the top flight on 11 February 2007 in a win against Torino, and played 9 games until the end of the season. Thanks to his contribution, the team, then led by Walter Mazzarri, attained salvation in spite of an 11-point deduction due to the 2006 Italian football scandal. Gazzi was awarded, together with his companions, the title of honorary citizen of Reggio Calabria.

=== Return to Bari ===
On 22 June 2007, the co-ownership agreement was resolved in favour of Bari, and the player returned to Apulia. On 22 September, during a game against Ravenna, he suffered an eye injury which forced him into hospital and resulted in two weeks on the sideline. On 21 November, he extended his contract with Bari until 2011.

In the 2008–09 season, with 39 appearances, Gazzi was one of the most active players in the promotion of Bari into Serie A, coached by Antonio Conte. The following year, he was a fixture of the team led by Giampiero Ventura, playing 32 games in the top flight. On 7 April 2010, he signed a further contract extension until 2013, and during 2011–2012, despite relegation, he was again an impressive player, with 31 games played. On 10 April 2011, he scored his first goal in Serie A against Catania.

=== Siena ===
After the relegation of Bari in Serie B, there were rumours of a possible transfer to Chievo Verona and especially Torino, but on 11 August 2011, a transfer was formalised to Sienna, newly promoted to Serie A.

The anchor of the midfield, made his debut under Giuseppe Sannino on 11 September against Catania and scored his first goal for the bianconeri 20 November, in a home game against Atalanta. He played 33 games for the club, scoring 1 goal.

=== Torino ===
On 13 July 2012, Gazzi was sold to Torino for €2.5 million cash, plus Matteo Rubin to Sienna in co-ownership. He officially debuted for Torino on 18 August 2012, in a Coppa Italia fixture against Lecce; his league debut for the Granata was on 26 August, against his former club, Siena. He scored his first goal for Torino on 30 September in a 1–5 win away against Atalanta. He concluded the 2012–13 season with 34 appearances and 2 goals - plus an appearance in Coppa Italia. On 28 August 2014 he made his debut in European competition in a 1–0 defeat of HNK Hajduk Split. In February 2015, he renewed his contract with the club until the end of the 2015–16 season.

=== Palermo ===
On 3 August 2016, Palermo announced the signing of Gazzi from Torino. Upon signing for the club, he was handed the number 14 shirt.

=== Alessandria ===
On 2 August 2017, he signed a two-year deal with Alessandria. In the summer of 2018, his contract was renewed until June 2020.

== 2011–12 Italian football scandal ==
In the month of August 2012, he was investigated by prosecutors in Bari for sporting fraud, along with his other former teammates at A.S. Bari, in regard to match-fixing in the past.

On 6 June 2013, he was suspended for 3 months and 10 days, plus a fine of €40,000.

== Style of play ==
Although he is able to play several midfield positions, Gazzi is usually deployed as a central or defensive midfielder, due to his work-rate, ball-winning abilities, as well as ability to organise his team and distribute the ball to the team-mates after winning back possession, despite his lack of notable technical skills. Known for his professionalism and consistency, he is a player with physicality and possesses a strong left foot.

== Career statistics ==
=== Club ===
Updated 31 May 2015.

Club	Season	League			Cup		Europe		Other		Total	
Club	Season	Division	Apps	Goals	Apps	Goals	Apps	Goals	Apps	Goals	Apps	Goals
Viterbese	2000–01	Serie B	2	0	0	0	—		—		2	0
Lazio	2001–02	Serie A	0	0	0	0	0	0	—		0	0
Lazio	2002–03	Serie A	0	0	0	0	0	0	—		0	0
Lazio	Total		0	0	0	0	0	0	—		0	0
Viterbese	2003–04	Serie C1	31	1	0	0	—		4	0	35	1
Bari	2004–05	Serie B	34	3	2	0	—		—		0	0
Bari	2005–06	Serie B	35	1	5	0	—		—		0	0
Bari	2006–07	Serie B	17	0	1	0	—		—		0	0
Reggina	2006–07	Serie A	9	0	—		—		—		30	3
Bari	2007–08	Serie B	37	1	3	0	—		—		0	0
Bari	2008–09	Serie B	39	0	0	0	—		—		0	0
Bari	2009–10	Serie A	32	0	1	0	—		—		0	0
Bari	2010–11	Serie A	31	1	2	0	—		—		0	0
Bari	Total		225	6	14	0	—		—		239	6
Siena	2011–12	Serie A	33	1	2	0	—		—		35	1
Torino	2012–13	Serie A	34	2	1	0	—		—		35	2
Torino	2013–14	Serie A	11	0	0	0	—		—		11	0
Torino	2014–15	Serie A	30	0	1	0	10 (Note: All appearances in UEFA Europa League)	0	—		41	0
Torino	2015–16	Serie A	0	0	0	0	—		—		0	0
Torino	Total		75	2	2	0	10	0	—		87	2
Career Total			379	10	18	0	10	0	4	0	407	10

== Honours ==
=== Club ===
Bari

- Serie B: 2008–09
