= Pablo González (Argentine footballer) =

Argentine footballer (born 1985)

Personal information
- Full name: Pablo Andrés González
- Date of birth: May 28, 1985 (age 41)
- Place of birth: Tandil, Argentina
- Height: 1.82 m (6 ft 0 in)
- Position: Striker

Team information
- Current team: RG Ticino (head coach)

Senior career*
Years	Team	Apps	(Gls)
2005–2008	Racing Club	4	(0)
2007–2008	→ Locarno (loan)	14	(2)
2008–2009	Tandil	28	(16)
2009–2011	Novara	64	(20)
2011–2012	Palermo	0	(0)
2011–2012	→ Siena (loan)	16	(1)
2012–2016	Novara	144	(45)
2016–2018	Alessandria	67	(32)
2019–2023	Novara	123	(22)
2023–2024	RG Ticino	32	(3)

Managerial career
- 2024–: RG Ticino
- * Club domestic league appearances and goals as of 22 April 2023

Pablo Andrés González (born 28 May 1985) is an Argentine football coach and retired forward. He is the head coach of Italian Serie D club RG Ticino.

== Career ==
A youth product of Racing Club de Avellaneda, González moved to Europe in 2007 for the first time to join Swiss club FC Locarno on loan. After a lone but successful season with Grupo Universitario de Tandil, González moved to Italy and signed with Lega Pro Prima Divisione club Novara, immediately becoming a mainstay for the club in its triumphant campaign ended with promotion in June 2010.

González's second season at Novara saw him performing as one of the top strikers in the Serie B league and assured him a growing reputation, and his performances led to interest from various Serie A and high-profile Serie B clubs; on 13 January 2011 Palermo chairman Maurizio Zamparini confirmed the signing of González from Novara, effective from 1 July. On 31 January 2010 Palermo officially announced the signing of González (later announced the fee was €5 million), who was allowed to complete the season on loan at Novara, in a bid that included co-ownerships of rosanero players Samir Ujkani and Michel Morganella (both tagged for €1.5M) and €2 million cash. He concluded the season with 45 appearances: 38 in the league, 4 in the promotion play–off and 2 in the Coppa Italia. He scored 15 goals: 14 in the league and 1 in the promotion play–off against Padova. Novara is promoted to Serie A after 55 years of absence. In the summer, he moved to Palermo. It marked the debut rosanero, 4 August 2011, in the Europa League against Thun.

On 31 August 2011 he moved on loan to Siena for €100,000 (discounted in order to compensate the signing of Milan Milanović), with option to sign for €2.8 million (or €1.4 million for half). He made his Serie A debut on 11 September 2011, against Catania.

On 22 June 2012, Palermo announced to have sold González back to Novara in a permanent deal, for €3 million, at the same time Morganella and Ujkani returned to Palermo also for €3 million.

In the summer of 2016 he signed a four-year contract with Alessandria.

On 14 December 2018 he joined Novara for the third time.

On 30 June 2023, González moved to RG Ticino in Serie D.

== Coaching career ==
On 28 May 2024, González was promoted head coach of Serie D club RG Ticino, his final team as a player.

== Personal life ==
He is the younger brother of fellow footballer Mariano González.

== Career statistics ==
As of match played 25 May 2022

Appearances and goals by club, season and competition
Club	Season	League			National Cup		Continental		Other		Total	
Club	Season	Division	Apps	Goals	Apps	Goals	Apps	Goals	Apps	Goals	Apps	Goals
Racing Club	2005–06	Argentine Primera División	4	0	0	0	—		—		4	0
Locarno (loan)	2007–08	Swiss Challenge League	14	2	0	0	—		—		14	2
Tandil	2008–09	Torneo Argentino B	28	16	—		—		—		28	16
Novara	2009–10	Lega Pro	25	5	0	0	0	0	2 (Note: Appearance(s) in Supercoppa di Serie C)	1	27	6
Novara	2010–11	Serie B	39	15	0	0	0	0	4 (Note: Appearance(s) in Promotion Playoffs)	1	43	16
Novara	Total		64	20	0	0	0	0	6	2	70	22
Palermo	2011–12	Serie A	0	0	0	0	1 (Note: Appearance(s) in UEFA Europa League)	1	—		1	1
Siena (loan)	2011–12	Serie A	16	1	4	2	—		—		20	3
Novara	2012–13	Serie B	39	14	2	1	—		2	0	43	15
Novara	2013–14	Serie B	34	6	2	1	—		2 (Note: Appearance(s) in Relegation Playoffs)	2	38	9
Novara	2014–15	Lega Pro	34	15	1	0	—		1	0	36	15
Novara	2015–16	Serie B	37	10	2	1	—		1	3	40	14
Novara	Total		144	45	7	3	0	0	6	5	157	53
Alessandria	2016–17	Lega Pro	37	20	2	0	—		6	2	45	22
Alessandria	2017–18	Serie C	30	12	1	0	—		2	1	33	13
Alessandria	Total		67	32	3	0	0	0	8	3	78	35
Novara	2018–19	Serie C	16	2	0	0	—		2	0	18	2
Novara	2019–20	Serie C	22	3	1	0	—		1	2	24	5
Novara	2020–21	Serie C	18	1	1	0	—		—		19	1
Novara	2021–22	Serie D	34	9	0	0	—		2 (Note: Appearance(s) in Serie D Final stage)	0	36	9
Novara	Total		90	15	2	0	0	0	5	2	97	17
Novara	Total Novara		298	80	9	3	0	0	17	9	324	92
Career total			427	131	16	5	1	1	25	12	469	149
