= Simone Gozzi =

Italian footballer (born 1986)

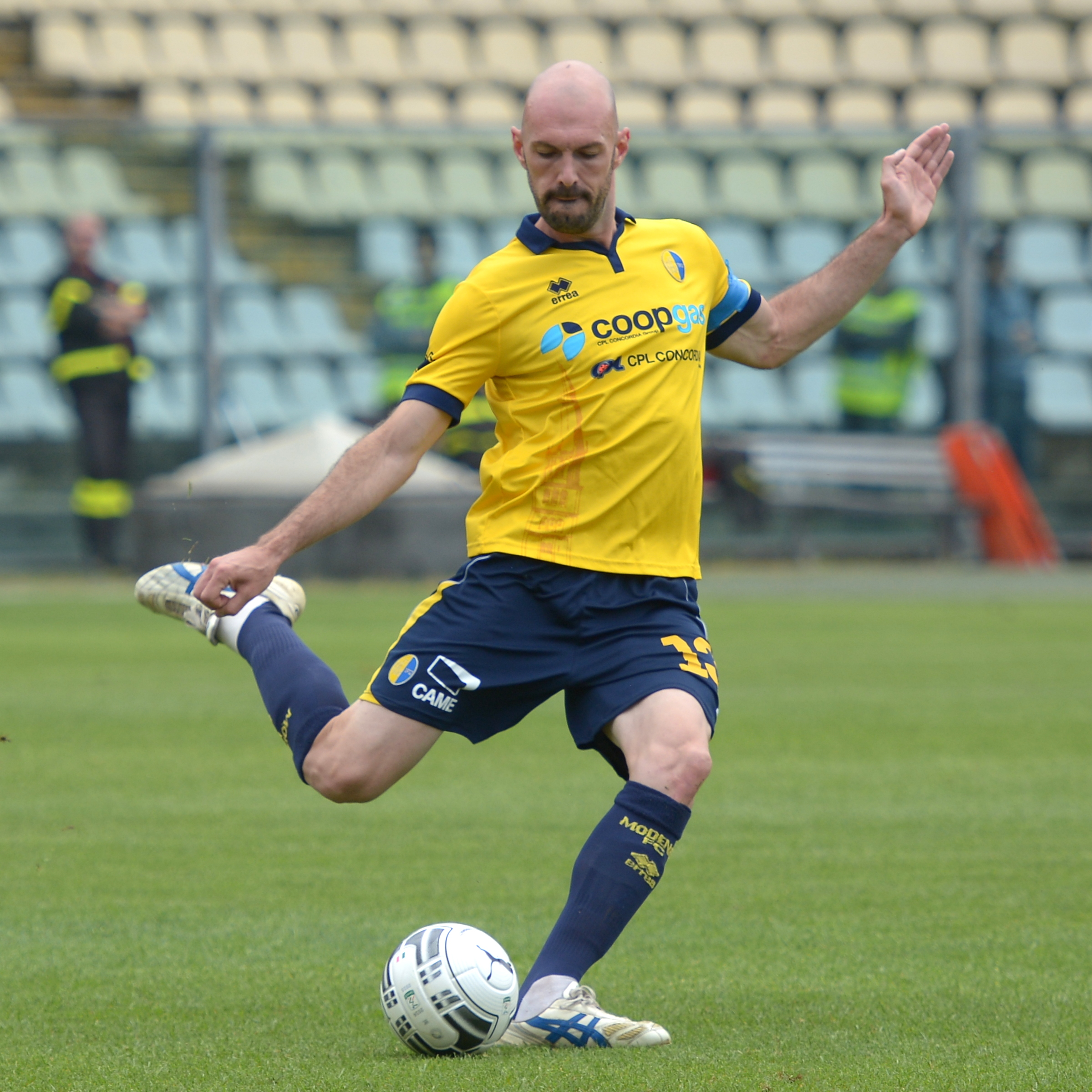
- Gozzi in 2015

Personal information
- Date of birth: 13 April 1986 (age 40)
- Place of birth: Reggio Emilia, Italy
- Height: 1.88 m (6 ft 2 in)
- Position: Right-back

Senior career*
Years	Team	Apps	(Gls)
2005–2007	Reggiana	60	(1)
2007–2016	Modena	262	(4)
2011–2012	→ Cagliari (loan)	2	(0)
2016–2018	Alessandria	44	(0)
2018	→ Pro Vercelli (loan)	20	(0)
2018–2019	Modena	21	(0)
2019–2020	Olbia	21	(0)
2020–2021	Carpi	28	(0)
- * Club domestic league appearances and goals as of 30 July 2021

Simone Gozzi (born 13 April 1986) is an Italian footballer who plays as a right-back.

== Club career ==
Born in Reggio Emilia, Emilia–Romagna, Gozzi started his career at hometown club Reggiana. On 6 July 2007 he was signed by Serie B team Modena F.C. in co-ownership deal. He made 25 starts that season. On 23 June 2008 Modena bought the remain 50% registration rights. On 19 July 2011 he was signed by Serie A team Cagliari, on loan for €100,000, with an option to purchase half of the registration rights.

Gozzi only played twice and in summer 2012 returned to Modena for their training camp.

After the relegation of Modena in Lega Pro, leaves the club and signed a two-year contract with the Alessandria.

On 24 September 2019, he signed with Olbia.

On 25 September 2020, he joined Carpi. Gozzi left the club at the end of the season.

== Career statistics ==
=== Club ===
As of match played 18 April 2021

Appearances and goals by club, season and competition
Club	Season	League			National Cup		Other		Total	
Club	Season	Division	Apps	Goals	Apps	Goals	Apps	Goals	Apps	Goals
Reggiana	2005–06	Serie C2	27	0	—		—		27	0
Reggiana	2006–07	Serie C2	33	1	—		—		33	1
Reggiana	Total		60	1	0	0	0	0	60	1
Modena	2007–08	Serie B	28	0	1	0	—		29	0
Modena	2008–09	Serie B	33	0	2	0	—		35	0
Modena	2009–10	Serie B	31	1	1	0	—		32	1
Modena	2010–11	Serie B	39	0	0	0	—		39	0
Modena	2012–13	Serie B	36	3	2	0	—		38	3
Modena	2013–14	Serie B	32	0	1	0	3 (Note: Appearance(s) in Serie B Playoffs)	0	36	0
Modena	2014–15	Serie B	31	0	2	0	2 (Note: Appearance(s) in Serie B Relegation Playoffs)	0	35	0
Modena	2015–16	Serie B	32	0	0	0	—		32	0
Modena	Total		262	4	9	0	5	0	276	4
Cagliari (loan)	2011–12	Serie A	2	0	1	0	—		3	0
Alessandria	2016–17	Serie C	31	0	1	0	7 (Note: One appearance in Coppa Italia Serie C, six appearances and one goal in Serie C Playoffs)	1	39	1
Alessandria	2017–18	Serie C	13	0	2	0	1 (Note: Appearance(s) in Coppa Italia Serie C)	0	16	0
Alessandria	2018–19	Serie C	0	0	1	0	—		1	0
Alessandria	Total		44	0	4	0	8	1	56	1
Pro Vercelli (loan)	2017–18	Serie B	20	0	—		—		20	0
Modena	2018–19	Serie D	21	0	1	0	1 (Note: Appearance(s) in Serie D Playoffs)	0	23	0
Olbia	2019–20	Serie C	21	0	—		2 (Note: Appearance(s) in Serie C Relegation Playoffs)	0	23	0
Carpi	2020–21	Serie C	28	0	—		—		28	0
Career total			458	5	15	0	16	1	489	6
