= Emanuele Pesoli =

Italian footballer (born 1980)

Personal information
- Full name: Emanuele Pesoli
- Date of birth: August 31, 1980 (age 46)
- Place of birth: Anagni, Italy
- Height: 6 ft 2 in (1.88 m)
- Position: Defender

Senior career*
| Years | Team | Apps | (Gls) |
| 1998–2000 | Anagni | 42 | (2) |
| 2000–2002 | Alzano | 18 | (2) |
| 2002–2003 | Tivoli | 16 | (1) |
| 2003 | Ancona | 0 | (0) |
| 2003–2004 | → Frascati (loan) | 30 | (7) |
| 2004–2005 | Vittoria | 14 | (0) |
| 2005–2007 | Vicenza | 45 | (1) |
| 2007–2008 | Venezia | 29 | (1) |
| 2008–2010 | Cittadella | 68 | (5) |
| 2010–2011 | Varese | 36 | (2) |
| 2011–2012 | Siena | 9 | (0) |
| 2012–2013 | Verona | 0 | (0) |
| 2013–2014 | Carpi | 36 | (1) |
| 2014–2016 | Pescara | 12 | (0) |
| 2016 | L'Aquila | 0 | (0) |

Managerial career
- 2022–2023: Viterbese
- * Club domestic league appearances and goals as of 25 January 2016

Emanuele Pesoli (born August 31, 1980) is an Italian football coach and former player, most recently in charge as manager of Serie C club Viterbese.

== Playing career ==
A defender, Pesoli started his career with hometown club Anagni. He successively moved up the divisions, reaching professional football level in 2002 with Serie C2 club Tivoli. In 2005 he made his Serie B debut with Vicenza.

On 30 June 2010 he moved to A.S. Varese 1910.

Pesoli was signed by Siena in July 2011 in 2-year contract, for €410,000 (plus €50,000 agent fee), re-joining Paolo Grossi who joined the Tuscan team on 6 July for €1.1 million. Pesoli chose no.26 shirt for Siena.

He was signed by Serie B newcomer Verona on 20 July 2012 in-2 tear deal for free, again re-joining Grossi. Pesoli played for Verona in friendly matches. Due to his ban, Pesoli did not play any competitive game for Verona in 2012–13 Serie B. Pesoli played once for the first team against the reserve team in October 2012. Verona promoted to Serie A in 2013.

On 5 July 2013 he was signed by Serie B newcomer Carpi.

=== Italian football scandal ===
Pesoli was allegedly involved in the fixed match Varese-Siena as a player of Varese. The match was the second last match of 2010-11 Serie B and both teams were competing for the promotion. On 10 August 2012 he was suspended for 3 years due to 2011 Italian football scandal. Soon after the ban he started a hunger strike in front of FIGC headquarters. On 15 August 2012, he ended his hunger strike at the request of his doctor, who asked him to eat something. In January 2013 the ban was reduced to 10 months by Tribunale Nazionale di Arbitrato per lo Sport of CONI.

== Coaching career ==
In 2017, after retirement, Pesoli took an coaching career and joined Pescara's youth coaching staff.

In November 2021, after having served as Giuseppe Pillon's assistant at Pescara, he was appointed in charge of the Under-19 team of Viterbese.

On 15 November 2022, following the dismissal of head coach Giacomo Filippi, Pesoli was promoted in charge of the first team of Viterbese on an interim basis. After having guided Viterbese for two games, he was permanently confirmed as head coach a week later. On 17 January 2023, after a string of negative results, Pesoli was dismissed from his role after just two months in charge of the team.
