= Milan Milanović =

Serbian footballer

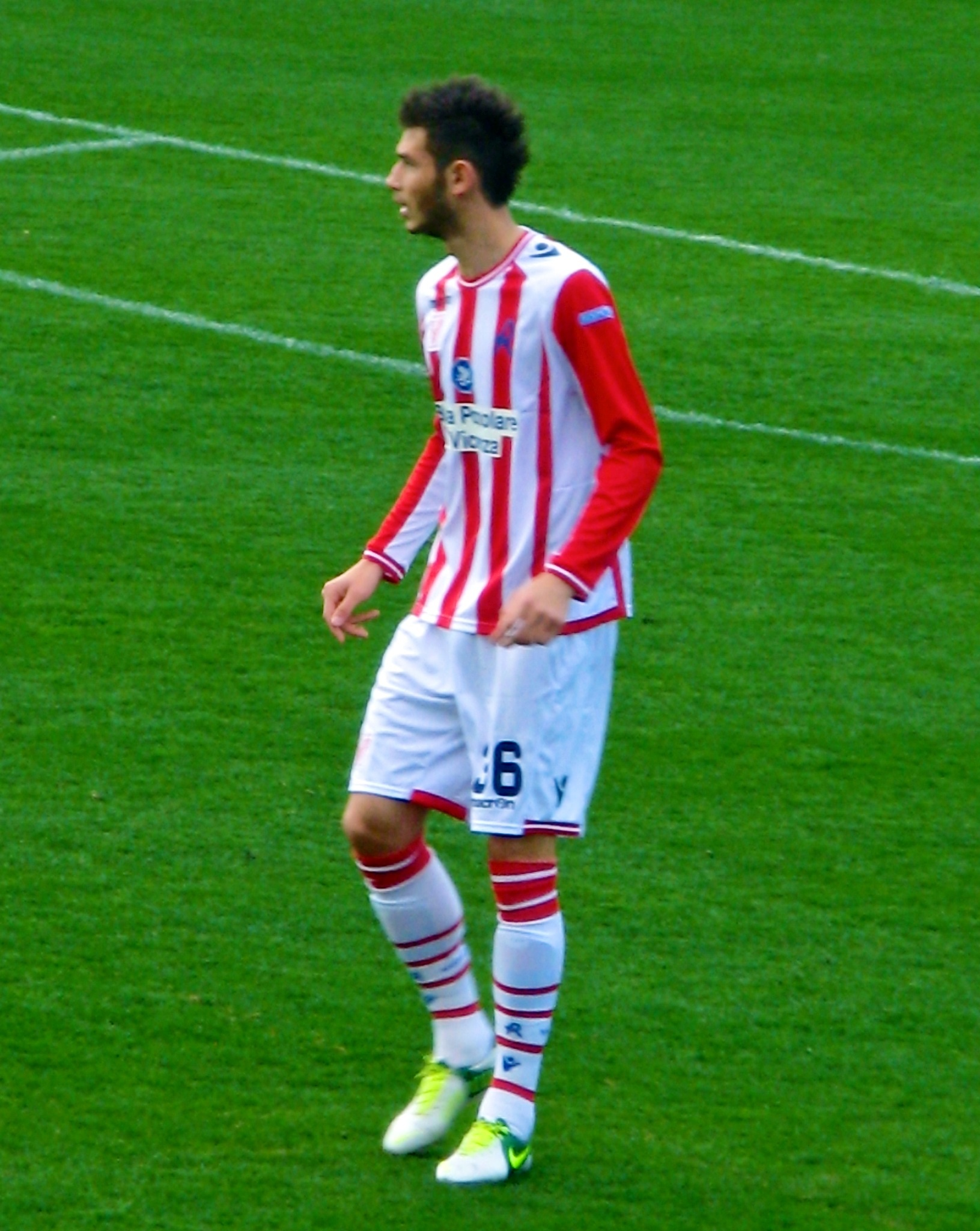

Personal information
- Date of birth: 31 March 1991 (age 35)
- Place of birth: Kosovska Mitrovica, SFR Yugoslavia
- Height: 1.94 m (6 ft 4 1/2 in)
- Position: Centre-back

Team information
- Current team: Sloga Doboj
- Number: 28

Youth career
- Zemun
- Red Star Belgrade
- 2008–2010: Lokomotiv Moscow

Senior career*
Years	Team	Apps	(Gls)
2010–2011	Lokomotiv Moscow	0	(0)
2011–2016	Palermo	23	(1)
2011–2012	→ Siena (loan)	0	(0)
2013	→ Vicenza (loan)	13	(0)
2015–2016	→ Ascoli (loan)	34	(1)
2017	Pisa	11	(0)
2019	Željezničar Banja Luka	13	(3)
2019–2020	Triglav Kranj	23	(7)
2021–2022	Radnički Kragujevac	8	(0)
2022–	Sloga Doboj	109	(1)

International career
- Serbia U17
- Serbia U19
	Serbia U21	14	(2)
- * Club domestic league appearances and goals as of 16 September 2026

Milan Milanović (Serbian Cyrillic: Милан Милановић; born 31 March 1991) is a Serbian professional footballer who plays for Bosnian Premier League club Sloga Doboj.

== Career ==
After youth football experiences in his homeland of Serbia, Milanović moved to Russia to join Lokomotiv Moscow in 2008. In 2009, he was voted by the fans as the best player of Lokomotiv youth team, and made his professional debut in 2010 with Russian Second Division feeder club FC Lokomotiv-2 Moscow.

=== Palermo ===
In November 2010 Milanović signed a pre-contract to join Serie A club Palermo. His contract with Moscow would run out in March 2011 thus Milanović was free to negotiate contract with Palermo in November. In July 2011 he was officially included in the first team squad of Palermo, and was awarded the No. 15 jersey.

On 31 August 2011 he moved "on loan" to Siena. It is because Palermo did not wish to use its own non-EU registration quota and borrowed Siena's instead, likes Udinese registered Željko Brkić via Siena. In the document of Lega Serie A, Siena signed him from Moscow as free agent, and Siena paid Lokomotiv €270,000 as training compensation as required by FIFA regulations. His "loan" was cancelled in January 2012, and he returned to Palermo for free. Palermo also paid €1.5 million agent fee. Again, Lega Serie A documented Palermo signed Milanović from Siena outright, not a loan return, likes Brkić also "signed" outright by Udinese in January 2012, as well as Luis Muriel from Lecce to Udinese. Despite Siena released Milanović for free, Siena also signed Pablo Andrés González in temporary deal from Palermo as compensation on 31 August 2011 for €100,000. While Milanović did receive some first team call-up, but only able to play a few games for the reserve team. Milanović made his Serie A debut on 24 March 2012, playing the full 90 minutes in a home league game against Udinese.

In January 2013 he moved on loan to Serie B club Vicenza. He returned to Palermo by the end of the season, after Vicenza's relegation to Lega Pro Prima Divisione.

=== Željezničar Banja Luka ===
In February 2019, he joined First League of the Republika Srpska club Željezničar Banja Luka until the end of the season.

== Career statistics ==
As of match played 16 September 2026

Appearances and goals by club, season and competition
Club	Season	League			National cup (Note: Includes Coppa Italia, Slovenian Cup, Serbian Cup, Bosnian Cup)		Other		Total	
Club	Season	Division	Apps	Goals	Apps	Goals	Apps	Goals	Apps	Goals
Palermo	2011–12	Serie A	5	0	—		—		5	0
Palermo	2013–14	Serie B	18	1	—		—		18	1
Palermo	2014–15	Serie A	0	0	1	0	—		1	0
Palermo	Total		23	1	1	0	—		24	1
Vicenza (loan)	2012–13	Serie B	13	0	2	0	—		15	0
Ascoli (loan)	2015–16	Serie B	34	1	—		—		34	1
Pisa	2016–17	Serie B	11	0	—		—		11	0
Željezničar Banja Luka	2018–19	First League of RS	13	3	—		—		13	3
Triglav Kranj	2019–20	Slovenian PrvaLiga	23	7	1	0	2 (Note: Appearances in the 2019–20 Slovenian PrvaLiga play-off)	0	26	7
Radnički Kragujevac	2021–22	Serbian SuperLiga	8	0	1	0	—		9	0
Sloga Doboj	2022–23	Bosnian Premier League	30	0	2	0	—		32	0
Sloga Doboj	2023–24	Bosnian Premier League	30	1	6	0	—		36	1
Sloga Doboj	2024–25	Bosnian Premier League	19	0	1	0	—		20	0
Sloga Doboj	2025–26	Bosnian Premier League	25	0	3	1	—		28	1
Sloga Doboj	2026–27	Bosnian Premier League	5	0	0	0	—		5	0
Sloga Doboj	Total		109	1	12	1	—		121	2
Career total			234	13	17	1	2	0	253	14
