= Giovanni Indiveri =

Italian footballer

Personal information
- Date of birth: 29 September 1974 (age 52)
- Place of birth: Monopoli, Italy
- Height: 1.87 m (6 ft 2 in)
- Position: Goalkeeper

Senior career*
Years	Team	Apps	(Gls)
1993–2000	Bari	5	(0)
1994–1995	→ Olbia (loan)	31	(0)
1995–1996	→ Benevento (loan)	12	(0)
2000	Castel di Sangro	0	(0)
2000–2001	Lanciano	33	(0)
2001–2002	Ascoli	32	(0)
2002–2003	Martina	32	(0)
2003–2005	Cesena	64	(0)
2005	Martina	3	(0)
2005–2006	Gela J-T	9	(0)
2006–2007	Gallipoli	11	(0)
2007	Pisa	11	(0)
2007–2009	Pescara	51	(0)
2009–2010	Cassino	24	(0)
2010–2011	Liberty Monopoli		
2011–2012	Victoria Locorotondo		
Total		318	(0)

Managerial career
- 2014–2019: Monopoli (goalkeepers coach)
- 2019–2020: Fasano (goalkeepers coach)
- 2020–2022: Taranto (goalkeepers coach)
- 2022–: Fasano (goalkeepers coach)
- * Club domestic league appearances and goals

Giovanni Indiveri (born 29 September 1974), is an Italian former professional footballer who played as a goalkeeper.

== Career ==
Revealed by Bari in 1993, Indiveri was a goalkeeper for several Italian football clubs, with emphasis on his spells at Lanciano, Ascoli and Cesena in the early 2000s, where he was champion. At the end of his career he also had a notable spell at Pescara in Serie C1. After finishing his career as a player, he became a goalkeeping coach, and currently works at Fasano.

== Honours ==
Lanciano

- Serie C2: 2000–01 (group B)

Ascoli

- Serie C1: 2001–02 (group B)
- Supercoppa di Serie C: 2002

Cesena

- Coppa Italia Serie C: 2003–04
