= Carlos Labrín =

Chilean footballer (born 1990)

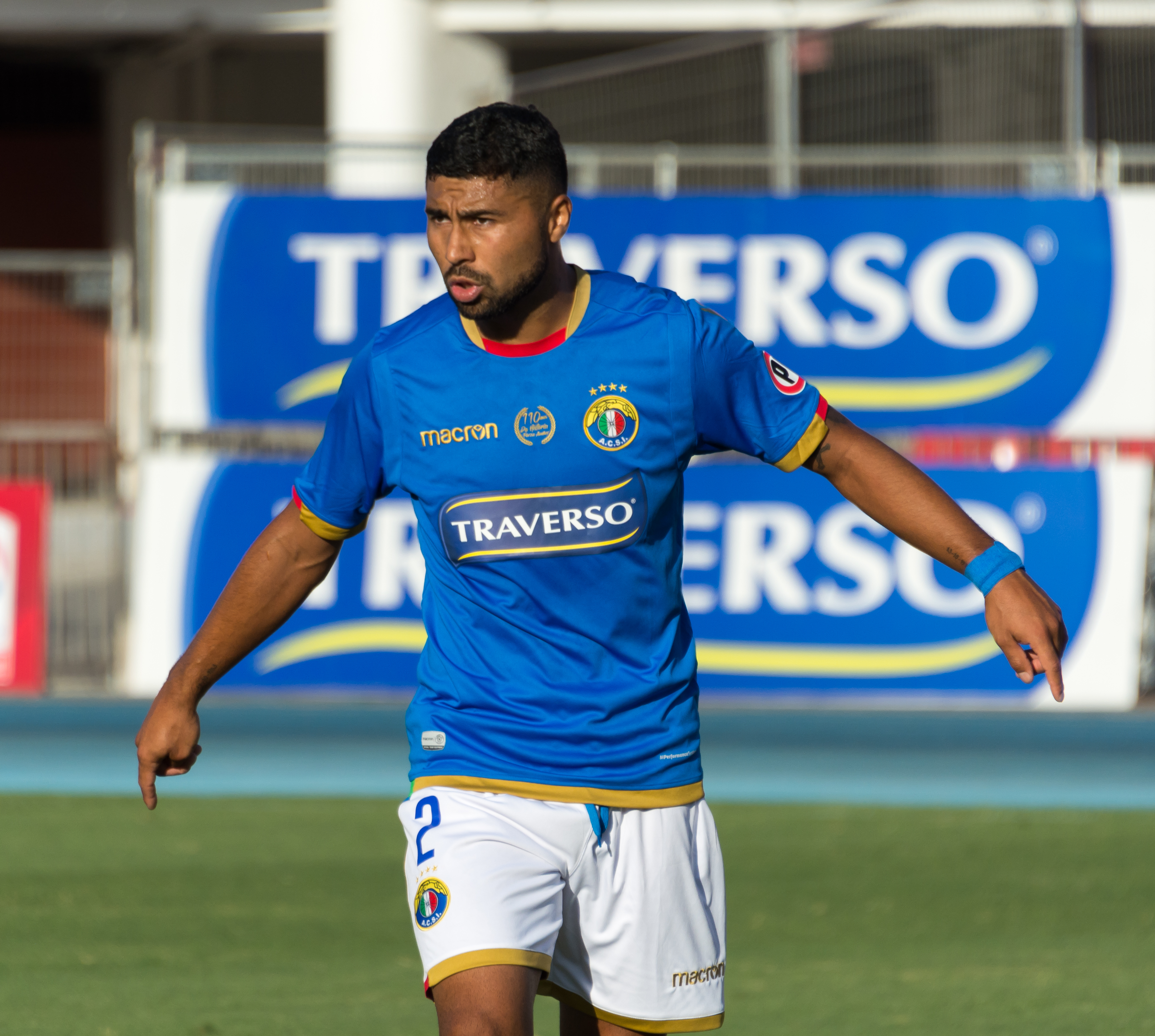
- Labrín with Audax Italiano in 2020

Personal information
- Full name: Carlos Alfredo Labrín Candia
- Date of birth: 2 December 1990 (age 35)
- Place of birth: Mulchén, Chile
- Height: 1.81 m (5 ft 11 1/2 in)
- Position: Centre back

Team information
- Current team: Rangers
- Number: 2

Youth career
- 2006–2008: Huachipato

Senior career*
| Years | Team | Apps | (Gls) |
| 2008–2011 | Huachipato | 97 | (0) |
| 2011–2014 | Palermo | 10 | (0) |
| 2011 | → Novara (loan) | 1 | (0) |
| 2013–2014 | → Huachipato (loan) | 29 | (0) |
| 2014–2015 | San Marcos | 34 | (0) |
| 2015–2023 | Audax Italiano | 190 | (4) |
| 2024–2025 | Ñublense | 43 | (0) |
| 2026– | Rangers | 1 | (0) |

International career^{‡}
| 2007 | Chile U17 | 4 | (0) |
| 2008–2010 | Chile U23 | 13 | (1) |
| 2009 | Chile U20 | 5 | (0) |
| 2010–2012 | Chile | 3 | (0) |
- * Club domestic league appearances and goals as of 23 February 2026 ‡ National team caps and goals as of 1 April 2012

Carlos Alfredo Labrín Candia (born 2 December 1990) is a Chilean footballer who plays for Rangers de Talca.

== Club career ==
Born in Mulchén, Labrín joined Huachipato youth set-up as a youngster. In 2008, he was promoted to the first-adult team and was quickly established as a starter centre back after his impressive performances during the Torneo Clausura.

On 28 January 2011 Palermo chairman Maurizio Zamparini confirmed the acquisition of Labrín, effective from July 2011, for €1.3 million. He was loaned to Novara in August 2011. He debuted with the piemotesi on 29 November against Catania in Coppa Italia.

He moved back to Palermo during the winter transfer window due to lack of first team opportunities at Novara. He made his Palermo debut only on 18 March 2012, as a surprise starting pick in an unusual 3–5–2 formation for a Serie A league game against Lecce, then being named in the starting lineup also for the two following games against Udinese and Bologna.

In January 2013 he returned to Huachipato — freshly Chilean football champion in the age — in a loan agreement until the end of the year. There Labrín played most of the team games in the year, including Copa Libertadores where he performed well in a 2–1 away win over Brazil's Grêmio in their new stadium. On 1 January 2014, his loan with Palermo to play at Huachipato was extended for six months, but he saw limited playing time under coach Mario Salas.

Following the differences mentioned with Salas, on 15 July 2014, Labrín moved to San Marcos de Arica where played all the games of the season. After a year at Arica y Parinacota Region–based team he joined Audax Italiano to face the 2015–16 season.

In 2024, Labrín signed with Ñublense alongside his teammate Osvaldo Bosso.

In December 2025, Labrín signed with Rangers de Talca in the Primera B de Chile.

== International career ==
In 2007, Labrín was called up to play with national under-17 team the FIFA category's World Cup qualifying which Chile failed to reach. In 2008, he represented Chile U23 at the 2008 Inter Continental Cup in Malaysia, scoring a goal. A year later he was nominated to the South American U-20 Championship at Venezuela by coach Ivo Basay which Chile neither qualified. However, later that year, as captain of the U-23 team, he led it to victory at the Toulon Tournament in France where he was named the tournament's best player.

On 29 August 2010, Labrín was selected for the first time to the senior side by manager Marcelo Bielsa, for a game against Ukraine at Kyiv.

== Honours ==
Huachipato

- Copa Chile: Runner-up 2013–14
- Toulon Tournament: 2009
