= Andrea Mantovani =

Italian footballer (born 1984)

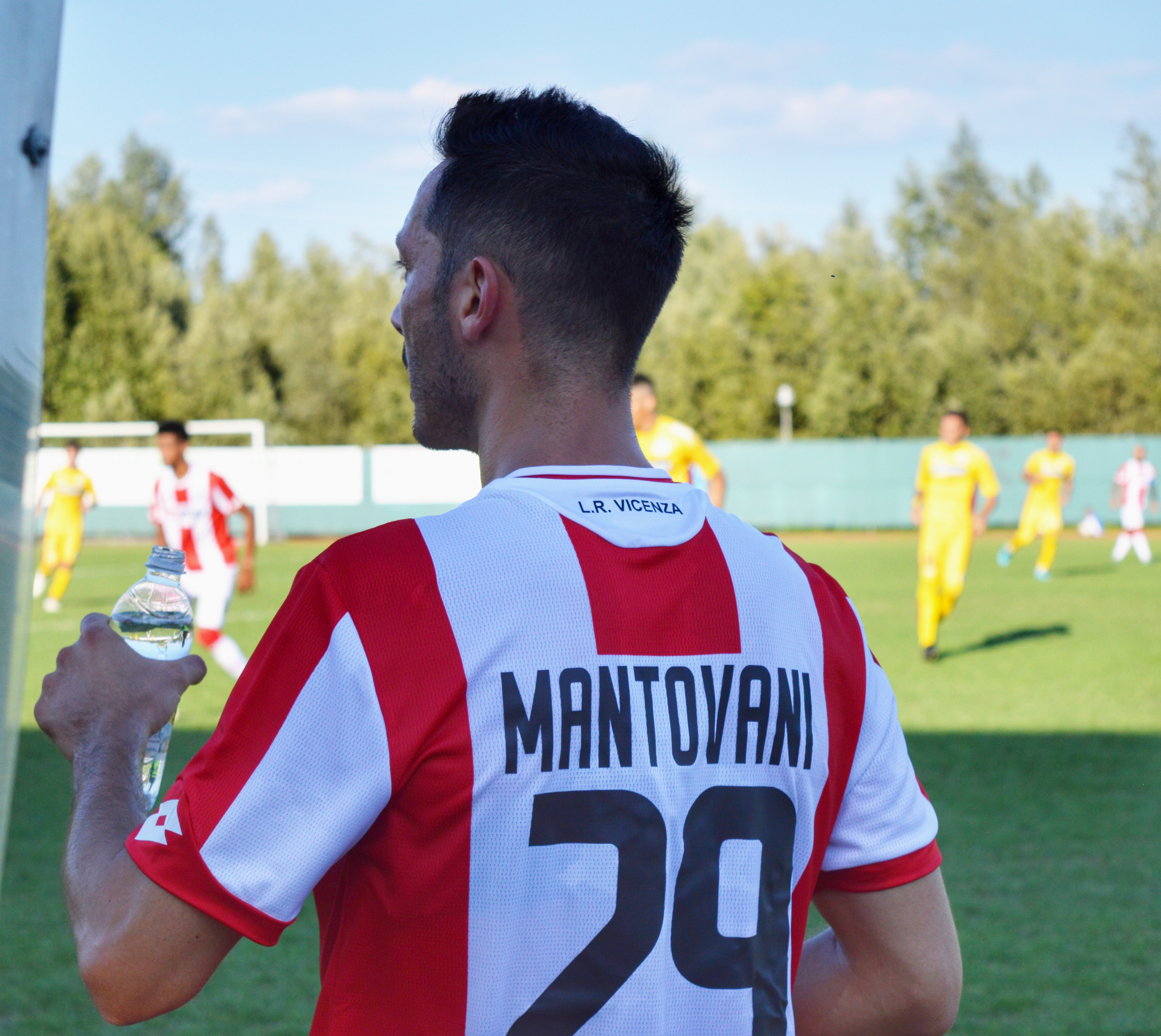
- Andrea Mantovani during a match

Personal information
- Date of birth: 22 June 1984 (age 42)
- Place of birth: Turin, Italy
- Height: 1.85 m (6 ft 1 in)
- Positions: Centre back; left back

Youth career
- Torino

Senior career*
| Years | Team | Apps | (Gls) |
| 2003–2005 | Torino | 40 | (1) |
| 2003–2004 | → Triestina (loan) | 39 | (2) |
| 2005–2011 | Chievo | 157 | (9) |
| 2011–2014 | Palermo | 30 | (2) |
| 2013–2014 | → Bologna (loan) | 21 | (0) |
| 2015 | Perugia | 9 | (0) |
| 2015–2016 | Vicenza | 17 | (0) |
| 2016–2018 | Novara | 61 | (0) |
| 2018–2019 | Vicenza | 21 | (1) |

International career
| 2000 | Italy U16 | 12 | (1) |
| 2000–2001 | Italy U17 | 14 | (0) |
| 2001–2002 | Italy U18 | 7 | (0) |
| 2001–2003 | Italy U19 | 12 | (0) |
| 2003 | Italy U20 | 3 | (0) |
| 2004–2007 | Italy U21 | 16 | (0) |
- * Club domestic league appearances and goals as of 12 May 2019

Andrea Mantovani (born 22 June 1984) is an Italian footballer who plays in the defender position.

== Club career ==
=== Torino ===
Mantovani started his career at Torino Calcio. He was a member of the Allievi Nazionali Under-17 team in the 2000–01 season. In the 2002–03 season, he occasionally received first-team call-up and made his debut on 19 January 2003 against Como, where he replaced Gianluca Comotto at half-time. The match ended in a 0–0 draw.

After Torino was relegated in 2003, he was loaned to Serie B side Triestina. In the 2004–05 season, Mantovani returned to Turin and played as one of the regular starters; he was awarded the no.4 shirt. The team won the promotion playoffs but then went bankrupt. FIGC allowed a new successor team to be admitted in 2005–06 Serie B, but the players were also allowed to leave on a free transfer.

=== Chievo ===
In August 2005, he was signed by Serie A side Chievo along with teammate Giovanni Marchese and, on 30 August, sold to Torino's rival Juventus in co-ownership for a nominal fee of €1,000. He was immediately loaned back to Chievo and played 4 league matches.

Partially due to the 2006 Italian football scandal, Juventus terminated all ongoing co-ownership deals in June 2006, and Mantovani was sold back to Chievo for about €301,000. He played 3 out of 4 European matches of Chievo, which exited in both the UEFA Champions League 3rd qualifying round and UEFA Cup first round.

Mantovani played 15 league starts in the 2006–07 season. Chievo slipped from 4th (post-trail) or 7th (pre-trail) in 2005–06 to 18th that season, and Mantovani followed the team relegated to Serie B. At Serie B, Mantovani became an absolute starter, started 36 out of 42 matches, missed round 16 and round 22 due to suspension, 1 match as a substitute and rested in the last round (round 42).

In June 2008, he signed a new 4-year contract with the club. After returning to Serie A, he continued to play as a regular and helped the team survive the relegation battle. In the 2009–10 season, he played as a left-back or one of the 3 central defenders in the 352 formation and helped the team remain in Serie A. He was either ahead of Bojan Jokić as left back or partnered with Jokić on the left flank: Jokić as wingback and Mantovani as left central defender.

=== Palermo ===
On 6 July 2011, after weeks of speculation surrounding his future, Mantovani agreed on a four-year deal with Palermo with a €3.5 million transfer fee, thus re-joining his former Chievo head coach Stefano Pioli to Sicily. He debuted with the rosanero on 28 July against Thun in the Europa League.

He spent the 2013–14 season on loan to Bologna. He was subsequently released on mutual consent on 11 September 2014.

=== Perugia ===
He was signed by Perugia in 2015.

=== Vicenza ===
On 27 July 2015 he was signed by Vicenza Calcio.

=== Novara ===
On 30 January 2016 Mantovani was signed by Novara, with Francesco Signori moved to opposite direction.

== International career ==
He was a part of the Italy national under-19 team which won the 2003 European Under-19 Championship, and played 16 games for the Italy national under-19 team.

He also played at 2001 UEFA European Under-16 Football Championship, 2006 UEFA European Under-21 Football Championship and 2007 UEFA European Under-21 Football Championship.

== Honours ==
=== Club ===
Chievo

- Serie B: 2007–08

Torino

- Serie B Runner-up: 2004–05

=== International ===
Italy U-19

- European Under-19 Championship: 2003

Italy U-20

- Under-20 Four Nations Tournament: 2006
