= Zuliani =

Zuliani is an Italian surname. Notable people with the surname include:

- Edhy Zuliani, Algerian-French footballer
- Geninho Zuliani, Brazilian politician
- Icilio Zuliani, Italian footballer
- Manuel Zuliani (born 2000), Italian rugby union footballer
- Mauro Zuliani (born 1959), Italian sprinter
- Mirco Zuliani (born 1953), Italian Air Force officer
- Polo Zuliani, Venetian nobleman, statesman, and Duke-elect of Candia

== See also ==
- Zuliani (Zulian) family
