= Guido Davì =

Italian footballer (born 1990)

Personal information
- Date of birth: 16 September 1990 (age 36)
- Place of birth: Palermo, Italy
- Height: 1.87 m (6 ft 2 in)
- Position: Central midfielder

Team information
- Current team: Marsala
- Number: 6

Youth career
- Palermo

Senior career*
Years	Team	Apps	(Gls)
2008–2010	Palermo	0	(0)
2010–2011	→ Juve Stabia (loan)	22	(0)
2011–2014	Juve Stabia	13	(0)
2012–2013	→ Benevento (loan)	25	(0)
2014	Benevento	11	(0)
2014–2016	Bassano	54	(5)
2016–2019	Feralpisalò	27	(0)
2017–2018	→ Sicula Leonzio (loan)	25	(0)
2019	Gubbio	18	(0)
2019–2021	Modena	46	(1)
2021–2022	Juve Stabia	31	(0)
2022–2023	Pistoiese	47	(1)
2023–2024	Grosseto	14	(1)
2024–	Nardò	11	(0)
- * Club domestic league appearances and goals as of 17 November 2024

Guido Davì (born 16 September 1990) is an Italian footballer who plays as a central midfielder for Serie D club Nardò.

== Career ==
On 7 August 2014, he reached an agreement with Serie C side Bassano.

On 11 January 2019, he joined Gubbio.

On 5 August 2019, he signed with Modena.

On 19 August 2021, he returned to Juve Stabia.

On 5 August 2022, Davì moved to Pistoiese in Serie D.
