= André Möllestam =

Swedish footballer

Personal information
- Full name: André Möllestam
- Date of birth: 14 May 1991 (age 35)
- Place of birth: Sweden
- Height: 1.87 m (6 ft 2 in)
- Position: Defender

Team information
- Current team: FC Höllviken
- Number: 33

Youth career
- Malmö FF
- Lunds BK
- –2009: Brommapojkarna
- 2009–2010: Lecce

Senior career*
Years	Team	Apps	(Gls)
2010–2011	Brommapojkarna	1	(0)
2011–2012	Lumezzane	1	(0)
2012–	FC Höllviken	10	(1)

International career
2006–2007	Sweden U17	6	(0)
2009	Sweden U19	5	(0)
- * Club domestic league appearances and goals

André Möllestam (born 14 May 1991) is a Swedish footballer who plays for FC Höllviken as a defender.
