= Paolo Grossi (footballer) =

Italian footballer

Personal information
- Date of birth: 29 May 1985 (age 41)
- Place of birth: Milan, Italy
- Height: 1.80 m (5 ft 11 in)
- Position: Winger

Senior career*
Years	Team	Apps	(Gls)
2004–2006	Caratese	59	(12)
2006–2009	Varese	91	(18)
2009–2011	AlbinoLeffe	37	(9)
2011–2012	Siena	17	(1)
2012–2015	Verona	16	(0)
2013	→ Pro Vercelli (loan)	6	(1)
2013–2014	→ Brescia (loan)	32	(4)
2014–2015	→ Lanciano (loan)	30	(3)
2015–2016	Ternana	22	(0)
2016–2017	Arezzo	21	(4)
- * Club domestic league appearances and goals

Paolo Grossi (born 29 May 1985) is an Italian former professional football player.

== Biography ==
Grossi was signed by AlbinoLeffe in co-ownership deal in 2009, for €180,000. In June 2011 Varese bought back Grossi for €455,000.

Grossi was signed by Siena outright for €1.1 million on 6 July 2011 in 3-year deal. He chose no.17 shirt. On 4 July 2012 he moved to Serie B newcomer Hellas Verona F.C. in temporary deal for €30,000 with option to purchase for €275,000. On 29 January 2013 50% "card" of Grossi was swapped with 50% "card" of Marco Guzzo, who also valued €275,000. 30 January 2013 Grossi was signed by fellow Serie B club Pro Vercelli. At the end of season Verona promoted from Serie B; Pro Vercelli relegated from Serie B and Siena relegated to Serie B. In June 2013 the co-ownership deals were renewed. On 2 September 2013 Grossi was signed by Serie B club Brescia Calcio in another temporary deal. On 20 August 2014 he was loaned out to Virtus Lanciano. On 24 August 2015 he signed on a free transfer to Ternana Calcio. On 19 July 2016 he signed with Serie C side U.S. Arezzo on a free transfer.
