= Ângelo (footballer, born June 1981) =

Brazilian footballer

Personal information
- Full name: Ângelo Mariano de Almeida
- Date of birth: June 12, 1981 (age 45)
- Place of birth: Salvador, Brazil
- Height: 1.75 m (5 ft 9 in)
- Positions: Full-back; defensive midfielder

Team information
- Current team: Montescaglioso Calcio

Senior career*
Years	Team	Apps	(Gls)
2000–2002	Corinthians	17	(1)
2003	São Caetano	13	(0)
2004	Criciúma	15	(1)
2005–2010	Lecce	129	(8)
2006	→ Crotone (loan)	12	(0)
2010–2011	Parma	21	(0)
2011–2014	Siena	82	(1)
2014–2015	Latina	25	(0)
2015–2017	Foggia	54	(3)
2017–2018	Matera	25	(0)
2019–	Montescaglioso Calcio		

International career
2001	Brazil U20		
- * Club domestic league appearances and goals as of 21 March 2018

Ângelo Mariano de Almeida (born 12 June 1981) more commonly known as Ângelo, is a Brazilian former footballer who last played for Montescaglioso Calcio. He was able to play both as a full-back and a defensive midfielder.

== Career ==
Ângelo started his football career in his native Brazil playing for Corinthians for three seasons. Then he moved to São Caetano, where he spent one season, and to Criciúma, for another season. During January 2005 in the winter session of Serie A, he was brought to Lecce, spending much of this season on loan at Crotone in Serie B.

As Zdeněk Zeman, the man who signed Ângelo, returned to Lecce for a second managerial spell, he ordered that the player return to Lecce in the summer of 2006. In 2006–2007 season he suffered from a serious injury at his knee, which he recovered from in the last matchdays of the championship.

At the end of the 2009–10 season, he was released by Lecce. On 2 September 2010, he was signed by Parma on a free transfer, but played a bit-part role as something of a utility player. He moved to Siena the following summer for €2.5 million along with the remain 50% rights of Reginaldo were exchanged with outright deal of Daniele Galloppa also for €5 million.

On 15 July 2015, he was signed by Foggia. On 30 August 2017, he joined Matera.

Montescaglioso Calcio announced on 5 February 2019, that Ângelo had joined the club.
