= 2011–12 ACF Fiorentina season =

Fiorentina
2011–12 season
- President: Mario Cognigni
- Manager: Siniša Mihajlović (until 7 November 2011); Delio Rossi (from 7 November 2011 to 2 May 2012); Vincenzo Guerini (from 2 May 2012)
- Stadium: Stadio Artemio Franchi
- Serie A: 13th
- Coppa Italia: Round of 16
- Top goalscorer: League: Stevan Jovetić (14); All: Stevan Jovetić (14)
- Highest home attendance: 36,387 vs Juventus (17 March 2012, Serie A)
- Lowest home attendance: 6,000 vs Cittadella (21 August 2011, Coppa Italia)
- Average home league attendance: 21,412
| Home colours | Away colours | Third colours |

The 2011–12 season was the 85th season in ACF Fiorentina's history and the club's 74th season in the top-flight of Italian football. Fiorentina competed in Serie A, finishing a disappointing 13th, and was eliminated in the round of 16 in the Coppa Italia.

== Club ==
=== Coaching staff ===
| Position | Staff |
|---|---|
| Head coach | Siniša Mihajlović |
| Assistant coach | Dario Marcolin |
| Team manager | Roberto Ripa |
| Goalkeepers coach | Giulio Nuciari |
| Athletic trainers | Antonio Bovenzi, Damir Blokar, Vincenzo Manzi |
| Doctor | Jacopo Giuliattini |
| Physiotherapist | Mauro Citzia |
| Masseurs | Maurizio Fagorzi, Daniele Misseri |

Source: violachannel.tv

== Players ==
=== Squad information ===
Last updated on 13 May 2012
Appearances include league matches only

| No. | Name | Nat | Position(s) | Date of birth (Age at end of season) | Signed from | Signed in | Apps. | Goals |
Goalkeepers
| 1 | Artur Boruc | (Poland) | GK | February 20, 1980 (aged 32) | (Scotland) Celtic | 2010 | 62 | 0 |
| 41 | Luca Lezzerini | (Italy) | GK | March 24, 1995 (aged 17) | (Italy) Youth Sector | 2011 | 0 | 0 |
| 89 | Neto | (Brazil) | GK | July 19, 1989 (aged 22) | (Brazil) Atlético Paranaense | 2011 | 2 | 0 |
Defenders
| 2 | Per Krøldrup | (Denmark) | CB | July 31, 1979 (aged 32) | (England) Everton | 2006 | 117 | 3 |
| 5 | Alessandro Gamberini | (Italy) | CB | August 27, 1981 (aged 30) | (Italy) Bologna | 2005 | 194 | 6 |
| 14 | Cesare Natali | (Italy) | CB | April 5, 1979 (aged 33) | (Italy) Torino | 2009 | 72 | 2 |
| 15 | Matija Nastasić | (Serbia) | CB | March 28, 1993 (aged 19) | (Serbia) Teleoptik | 2011 | 25 | 2 |
| 16 | Mattia Cassani | (Italy) | RB | August 26, 1983 (aged 28) | (Italy) Palermo | 2011 | 26 | 1 |
| 19 | Felipe | (Brazil) | CB | July 31, 1984 (aged 27) | (Italy) Udinese | 2010 | 26 | 0 |
| 23 | Manuel Pasqual (Captain) | (Italy) | LB / LM | March 13, 1982 (aged 30) | (Italy) Arezzo | 2005 | 204 | 3 |
| 29 | Lorenzo De Silvestri | (Italy) | RB | May 23, 1988 (aged 24) | (Italy) Lazio | 2009 | 74 | 2 |
| 31 | Michele Camporese | (Italy) | CB | May 19, 1992 (aged 20) | (Italy) Youth Sector | 2011 | 16 | 1 |
Midfielders
| 6 | Juan Manuel Vargas | (Peru) | LW / LB / LM | October 5, 1983 (aged 28) | (Italy) Catania | 2008 | 104 | 12 |
| 10 | Rubén Olivera | (Uruguay) | AM / CM / RW / LW | May 4, 1983 (aged 29) | (Italy) Lecce | 2012 | 9 | 0 |
| 13 | Houssine Kharja | (Morocco) | CM / DM / AM | November 9, 1982 (aged 29) | (Italy) Genoa | 2011 | 29 | 0 |
| 17 | Amidu Salifu | (Ghana) | CM | September 20, 1992 (aged 19) | (Italy) Vicenza | 2011 | 15 | 0 |
| 18 | Riccardo Montolivo | (Italy) | DM / CM | January 18, 1985 (aged 27) | (Italy) Atalanta | 2005 | 219 | 17 |
| 21 | Andrea Lazzari | (Italy) | CM / LW / AM | December 3, 1984 (aged 27) | (Italy) Cagliari | 2011 | 33 | 2 |
| 32 | Marco Marchionni | (Italy) | DM / RM / CM | July 22, 1980 (aged 31) | (Italy) Juventus | 2009 | 60 | 7 |
| 85 | Valon Behrami | (Switzerland) | CM | April 19, 1985 (aged 27) | (England) West Ham United | 2011 | 48 | 0 |
| 92 | Rômulo | (Brazil) | RB / CM | May 22, 1987 (aged 25) | (Brazil) Atlético Paranaense | 2011 | 10 | 0 |
Forwards
| 8 | Stevan Jovetić | (Montenegro) | CF / ST | November 2, 1989 (aged 22) | (Serbia) Partizan | 2008 | 85 | 22 |
| 11 | Amauri | (Italy) | CF / ST | June 3, 1980 (aged 32) | (Italy) Juventus | 2012 | 13 | 1 |
| 22 | Adem Ljajić | (Serbia) | LW / RW / SS / AM | 29 September 1991 (aged 20) | (Serbia) Partizan | 2010 | 50 | 4 |
| 30 | Ryder Matos | (Brazil) | ST / LW / RW | November 10, 1992 (aged 19) | (Brazil) Vitória | 2011 | 0 | 0 |
| 37 | Boadu Maxwell Acosty | (Ghana) | RW / LW / CF | September 10, 1991 (aged 20) | (Italy) Youth Sector | 2011 | 5 | 0 |
Players transferred during the season
| 9 | Khouma Babacar | (Senegal) | CF / ST | March 17, 1993 (aged 19) | (Italy) Youth Sector | 2009 | 23 | 1 |
| 10 | Santiago Silva | (Uruguay) | CF / ST | December 9, 1980 (aged 31) | (Argentina) Vélez Sarsfield | 2011 | 12 | 1 |
| 11 | Alberto Gilardino | (Italy) | CF / ST | July 5, 1982 (aged 29) | (Italy) Milan | 2008 | 118 | 48 |
| 20 | Gianni Munari | (Italy) | CM / RM / DM | June 24, 1983 (aged 29) | (Italy) Lecce | 2011 | 11 | 0 |

== Transfers ==
=== In ===
| No. | Pos. | Nat. | Name | Age | EU | Moving from | Type | Transfer window | Ends | Transfer fee | Source |
|---|---|---|---|---|---|---|---|---|---|---|---|
| 92 | DF | (Brazil) | Rômulo | 24 | EU | Cruzeiro (Brazil) | Transfer | Summer | 2015 | €2.5m | violachannel.tv |
| 15 | DF | (Serbia) | Matija Nastasić | 18 | Non-EU | Partizan (Serbia) | Transfer | Summer | 2014 | €2.5m | violachannel.tv |
| 20 | MF | (Italy) | Gianni Munari | 28 | EU | Lecce | Transfer | Summer | 2014 | Undisclosed | violachannel.tv |
| 21 | MF | (Italy) | Andrea Lazzari | 26 | EU | Cagliari | Co-ownership | Summer | 2014 | Undisclosed | violachannel.tv |
| 13 | MF | (Morocco) | Houssine Kharja | 28 | EU | Genoa | Co-ownership | Summer | 2013 | Co-ownership | violachannel.tv |
| 16 | DF | (Italy) | Mattia Cassani | 27 | EU | Palermo | Loan | Summer | 2012 | — | violachannel.tv |
| 10 | FW | (Uruguay) | Santiago Silva | 30 | Non-EU | Vélez Sarsfield (Argentina) | Transfer | Summer | 2013 | €1.7m | violachannel.tv |

Total spending: ▼ ~€6.7 million

=== Out ===
| No. | Pos. | Nat. | Name | Age | EU | Moving to | Type | Transfer window | Transfer fee | Source |
|---|---|---|---|---|---|---|---|---|---|---|
| 4 | MF | (Italy) | Marco Donadel | 28 | EU | Napoli | Transfer | Summer | Free | sscnapoli.it |
| 10 | FW | (Romania) | Adrian Mutu | 32 | EU | Cesena | Transfer | Summer | Free | violachannel.tv |
| 21 | MF | (Italy) | Gaetano D'Agostino | 29 | EU | Udinese | Transfer | Summer | €111k | udinese.it |
| | MF | (Uganda) | Savio Nsereko | 21 | EU | Juve Stabia | Loan | Summer | — | violachannel.tv |
| | FW | (Brazil) | Jefferson | 23 | EU | Latina | Loan | Summer | — | violachannel.tv |
| 25 | DF | (Italy) | Gianluca Comotto | 32 | EU | Cesena | Transfer | Summer | Free | cesenacalcio.it |
| | MF | (Italy) | Francesco Di Tacchio | 21 | EU | Juve Stabia | Loan | Summer | — | violachannel.tv |
| | DF | (Italy) | Federico Masi | 20 | EU | Bari | Co-ownership | Summer | €500 | violachannel.tv |
| | DF | (Italy) | Andrea Bagnai | 19 | EU | Carrarese | Co-ownership | Summer | €500 | violachannel.tv |
| | DF | (Italy) | Tafi | 20 | EU | Borgo a Buggiano | Co-ownership | Summer | €500 | violachannel.tv |
| 7 | MF | (Argentina) | Mario Santana | 29 | EU | Napoli | Transfer | Summer | Free | sscnapoli.it |
| 45 | MF | (Italy) | Federico Carraro | 19 | EU | Modena | Loan | Summer | — | violachannel.tv |
| | MF | (Italy) | Massimiliano Taddei | 20 | EU | Carrarese | Loan | Summer | — | violachannel.tv |
| 35 | GK | (Serbia) | Vlada Avramov | 32 | Non-EU | Cagliari | Transfer | Summer | Free | cagliaricalcio.net |
| | GK | (Italy) | Andrea Seculin | 21 | EU | Juve Stabia | Loan | Summer | — | violachannel.tv |
| | MF | (Italy) | Grifoni | 18 | EU | Venezia | Loan | Summer | — | violachannel.tv |
| 1 | GK | (France) | Sébastien Frey | 31 | EU | Genoa | Transfer | Summer | Free | genoacfc.it |
| 27 | FW | (Switzerland) | Haris Seferovic | 19 | Non-EU | Neuchâtel Xamax (Switzerland) | Loan | Summer | — | violachannel.tv |
| 20 | MF | (Senegal) | Papa Waigo | 27 | Non-EU | Ascoli | Transfer | Summer | Free | violachannel.tv |
| 40 | DF | (Italy) | Cristiano Piccini | 18 | EU | Carrarese | Loan | Summer | — | violachannel.tv |

Total income: ▲ ~€111,000

== Pre-season and friendlies ==
| 17 July 2011 Friendly | Calcio Cortina | 0–12 | Fiorentina | Cortina d'Ampezzo, Italy |
| 17:30 CEST (UTC+02:00) | | Report | Waigo 2'; Gilardino 9', 15', 24', 32'; Salifu 39', 43'; Rimoldi 47' (o.g.); Jovetić 59'; Babacar 64'; Iemmello 79'; Cerci 81' | Referee: Davide Oggioni |

| 21 July 2011 Friendly | Vazzolese | 0–14 | Fiorentina | Cortina d'Ampezzo, Italy |
| 17:00 CEST (UTC+02:00) | | Report | Jovetić 10' (pen.), 23', 36'; Gilardino 43', 45'; Ljajić 48', 79'; Cerci 57', 64', 78'; Iemmello 71'; Behrami 72'; Seferovic 74'; Gamberini 85' | Referee: Andrea Zanonato |

| 24 July 2011 Friendly | Treviso | 1–5 | Fiorentina | Cortina d'Ampezzo, Italy |
| 17:30 CEST (UTC+02:00) | Perna 56' | Report | Gilardino 26', 43', 45'; Ljajić 76', 79' | Referee: Ros |

| 29 July 2011 Friendly | Torino | 0–0 | Fiorentina | Sappada, Italy |
| 16:00 CEST (UTC+02:00) | | Report | | Referee: Dino Tommasi |

| 3 August 2011 Friendly | Gavorrano | 1–3 | Fiorentina | San Piero a Sieve, Italy |
| 18:00 CEST (UTC+02:00) | Spanu 12' | Report | Gamberini 21'; Cerci 24'; Gilardino 34' | Referee: Massimiliano Velotto |

| 6 August 2011 Friendly | Newcastle United (England) | 0–0 abandoned | (Italy) Fiorentina | Newcastle upon Tyne, England |
| 16:00 CEST (UTC+02:00) | | Report | | Stadium: St James' Park; Attendance: 12,656; Referee: Mark Halsey |

| 10 August 2011 Friendly | Fortis Juventus | 0–4 | Fiorentina | Borgo San Lorenzo, Italy |
| 18:00 CEST (UTC+02:00) | | Report | Lazzari 7'; Gilardino 26', 31'; Cerci 50' | Attendance: 1,500; Referee: Meozzi |

| 13 August 2011 Friendly | Fiorentina | 6–1 | Fiorentina Primavera | San Piero a Sieve, Italy |
| 16:00 CEST (UTC+02:00) | Gilardino 17', 38'; Munari 22'; Cerci 41'; Babacar 52'; Romizi 68' | Report | Acosty 9' | Referee: Obertani |

| 18 August 2011 Friendly | Resco Reggello | 0–17 | Fiorentina | Reggello, Italy |
| 18:00 CEST (UTC+02:00) | | Report | Gilardino 4', 22', 24', 41'; Cerci 8', 18', 26'; Gamberini 15'; Jovetić 23', 29', 32'; Jackson 55'; Ljajić 56'; Marchionni 63', 70'; Munari 78'; Matos 80' |

== Competitions ==
=== Overall ===
| Competition | Started round | Current position | Final position | First match | Last match |
|---|---|---|---|---|---|
| Serie A | Matchday 1 | — | 13th | 11 September 2011 | 13 May 2012 |
| Coppa Italia | Third round | — | Round of 16 | 21 August 2011 | 11 January 2012 |

Last updated: 13 May 2012

=== Serie A ===
==== League table ====
| Pos | Team | Pld | W | D | L | GF | GA | GD | Pts |
|---|---|---|---|---|---|---|---|---|---|
| 11 | Catania | 38 | 11 | 15 | 12 | 47 | 52 | −5 | 48 |
| 12 | Atalanta (Note: Atalanta were deducted 6 points due to involvement in the 2011–12 Italian football scandal.) | 38 | 13 | 13 | 12 | 41 | 43 | −2 | 46 (Note: Atalanta finished ahead of Fiorentina on head–to–head away goals scored: Atalanta 2–0 Fiorentina, Fiorentina 2–2 Atalanta.) |
| 13 | Fiorentina | 38 | 11 | 13 | 14 | 37 | 43 | −6 | 46 |
| 14 | Siena | 38 | 11 | 11 | 16 | 45 | 45 | 0 | 44 |
| 15 | Cagliari | 38 | 10 | 13 | 15 | 37 | 46 | −9 | 43 (Note: Cagliari finished ahead of Palermo on goal difference : Cagliari 2–1 Palermo, Palermo 3–2 Cagliari; Cagliari = –9, Palermo = –10.) |

Source: Lega Serie A
Rules for classification: 1) points; 2) head-to-head points; 3) head-to-head goal difference; 4) head-to-head goals scored; 5) goal difference; 6) number of goals scored

==== Results summary ====
| Overall | | | | | | | | Home | | | | | | Away | | | | | |
| Pld | W | D | L | GF | GA | GD | Pts | W | D | L | GF | GA | GD | W | D | L | GF | GA | GD |
|---|---|---|---|---|---|---|---|---|---|---|---|---|---|---|---|---|---|---|---|
| 38 | 11 | 13 | 14 | 37 | 43 | −6 | 46 | 7 | 7 | 5 | 24 | 22 | +2 | 4 | 6 | 9 | 13 | 21 | −8 |

Last updated: 13 May 2012.
Source: Competitive matches

==== Results by round ====
| Round | 1 | 2 | 3 | 4 | 5 | 6 | 7 | 8 | 9 | 10 | 11 | 12 | 13 | 14 | 15 | 16 | 17 | 18 | 19 | 20 | 21 | 22 | 23 | 24 | 25 | 26 | 27 | 28 | 29 | 30 | 31 | 32 | 33 | 34 | 35 | 36 | 37 | 38 |
|---|---|---|---|---|---|---|---|---|---|---|---|---|---|---|---|---|---|---|---|---|---|---|---|---|---|---|---|---|---|---|---|---|---|---|---|---|---|---|
| Ground | A | H | A | H | A | H | A | H | A | H | A | H | A | H | A | H | A | H | A | H | A | H | A | H | A | H | A | H | A | H | A | H | A | H | A | H | A | H |
| Result | L | W | L | W | D | L | D | D | L | W | L | D | L | W | L | D | W | L | D | W | L | W | D | L | L | W | L | L | D | L | W | D | W | D | L | D | W | D |
| Position | 11 | 5 | 11 | 5 | 5 | 10 | 13 | 11 | 14 | 11 | 12 | 15 | 15 | 11 | 14 | 14 | 10 | 14 | 15 | 11 | 14 | 11 | 13 | 14 | 15 | 12 | 15 | 16 | 16 | 17 | 15 | 16 | 15 | 14 | 16 | 15 | 13 | 13 |

Updated to match(es) played on 13 May 2012. Source: Competitive matches
A = Away; H = Home; W = Win; D = Draw; L = Loss

==== Matches ====
| 11 September 2011 2 | Fiorentina | 2–0 | Bologna | Florence |
| 15:00 CEST (UTC+02:00) | Gilardino 20'; Cerci 47'; Lazzari (yellow card) 74' | Report | Portanova (yellow card) 29' | Stadium: Stadio Artemio Franchi; Attendance: 20,040; Referee: Marco Guida |

| 18 September 2011 3 | Udinese | 2–0 | Fiorentina | Udine |
| 15:00 CEST (UTC+02:00) | Di Natale 8' (pen.); Isla 29'; Abdi (yellow card) 88' | Report | Gamberini (yellow card) 7'; Montolivo (yellow card) 24'; Behrami (yellow card) 75'; Munari (yellow card) 90' | Stadium: Stadio Friuli; Attendance: 16,125; Referee: Andrea Romeo |

| 21 September 2011 4 | Fiorentina | 3–0 | Parma | Florence |
| 20:45 CEST (UTC+02:00) | Jovetić 46', 81'; Cerci 61' | Report | Jadid (yellow card) 12'; Zaccardo (yellow card) 40'; Paletta (yellow card) 50'; Biabiany (yellow card) 84' | Stadium: Stadio Artemio Franchi; Attendance: 20,436; Referee: Nicola Rizzoli |

| 24 September 2011 5 | Napoli | 0–0 | Fiorentina | Naples |
| 20:45 CEST (UTC+02:00) | Inler (yellow card) 41'; Hamšík (yellow card) 63' | Report | Vargas (yellow card) 49'; Behrami (yellow card) 82'; Montolivo (yellow card) 86' | Stadium: Stadio San Paolo; Attendance: 40,653; Referee: Paolo Valeri |

| 2 October 2011 6 | Fiorentina | 1–2 | Lazio | Florence |
| 15:00 CEST (UTC+02:00) | Cerci 8'; Lazzari (yellow card) 18'; Natali (yellow card) 46'; Behrami (yellow card) 86' | Report | Dias (yellow card) 26'; Hernanes 28'; Klose 83' | Stadium: Stadio Artemio Franchi; Attendance: 22,773; Referee: Mauro Bergonzi |

| 16 October 2011 7 | Cesena | 0–0 | Fiorentina | Cesena |
| 12:30 CEST (UTC+02:00) | Ghezzal (yellow card) 67'; Mutu (red card) 73'; Ceccarelli (yellow card) 85' | Report | Montolivo (yellow card) 69'; Cassani (yellow card) 73'; Ljajić (yellow card) 78'; Munari (yellow card) 80' | Stadium: Stadio Dino Manuzzi; Attendance: 16,308; Referee: Carmine Russo |

| 22 October 2011 8 | Fiorentina | 2–2 | Catania | Florence |
| 18:00 CEST (UTC+02:00) | Jovetić 20', 61'; Montolivo (yellow card) 30' | Report | Delvecchio 43'; Spolli (yellow card) 59'; Maxi López 82' | Stadium: Stadio Artemio Franchi; Attendance: 18,783; Referee: Antonio Danilo Giannoccaro |

| 25 October 2011 9 | Juventus | 2–1 | Fiorentina | Turin |
| 20:45 CEST (UTC+02:00) | Bonucci 13'; Matri 65'; Marchisio (yellow card) 84' | Report | Jovetić 57'; Behrami (yellow card) 68'; Munari (yellow card) 76'; Natali (yellow card) 90+2' | Stadium: Juventus Stadium; Attendance: 35,517; Referee: Daniele Orsato |

| 30 October 2011 10 | Fiorentina | 1–0 | Genoa | Florence |
| 15:00 CET (UTC+01:00) | Lazzari 41'; Natali (yellow card) 47' | Report | Kucka (yellow card) 33' | Stadium: Stadio Artemio Franchi; Attendance: 19,312; Referee: Sebastiano Peruzzo |

| 6 November 2011 11 | Chievo | 1–0 | Fiorentina | Verona |
| 15:00 CET (UTC+01:00) | Dramé (yellow card) 60'; Rigoni 66' | Report | Natali (yellow card) 42'; Lazzari (yellow card) 51'; Jovetić (yellow card) 65' | Stadium: Stadio Marc'Antonio Bentegodi; Attendance: 8,250; Referee: Gabriele Gava |

| 19 November 2011 12 | Fiorentina | 0–0 | Milan | Florence |
| 20:45 CET (UTC+01:00) | Behrami (yellow card) 62' | Report | Aquilani (yellow card) 83' | Stadium: Stadio Artemio Franchi; Attendance: 33,295; Referee: Paolo Mazzoleni |

| 27 November 2011 13 | Palermo | 2–0 | Fiorentina | Palermo |
| 15:00 CET (UTC+01:00) | Miccoli 22', (yellow card) 29'; Zahavi (yellow card) 35'; Iličić 73' | Report | Natali (yellow card) 55' (yellow-red card) 89' | Stadium: Stadio Renzo Barbera; Attendance: 19,536; Referee: Carmine Russo |

| 4 December 2011 14 | Fiorentina | 3–0 | Roma | Florence |
| 15:00 CET (UTC+01:00) | Jovetić 17' (pen.); Gamberini 44'; Silva 86' (pen.) | Report | Juan (red card) 17'; Gago (yellow card) 63' (yellow-red card) 76'; Bojan (red card) 85' | Stadium: Stadio Artemio Franchi; Attendance: 21,863; Referee: Antonio Damato |

| 10 December 2011 15 | Internazionale | 2–0 | Fiorentina | Milan |
| 20:45 CET (UTC+01:00) | Maicon (yellow card) 38'; Pazzini 41'; Nagatomo 49' | Report | Gamberini (yellow card) 50' | Stadium: San Siro; Attendance: 39,917; Referee: Paolo Tagliavento |

| 17 December 2011 16 | Fiorentina | 2–2 | Atalanta | Florence |
| 20:45 CET (UTC+01:00) | Gilardino 9'; Behrami (yellow card) 45'; Jovetić 8' | Report | Cigarini (yellow card) 61'; Masiello 81'; Denis 85' | Stadium: Stadio Artemio Franchi; Attendance: 15,812; Referee: Sebastiano Peruzzo |

| 12 December 2011 1 | Siena | 0–0 | Fiorentina | Siena |
| 18:00 CET (UTC+01:00) | D'Agostino (yellow card) 22'; Gazzi (yellow card) 31'; Larrondo (yellow card) 84'; Rossettini (yellow card) 87'; Vitiello (yellow card) 89' | Report | Montolivo (yellow card) 26'; De Silvestri (yellow card) 33'; Behrami (yellow card) 78'; Gilardino (yellow card) 83'; Gamberini (yellow card) 84' | Stadium: Stadio Artemio Franchi – Montepaschi Arena; Attendance: 9,117; Referee: Luca Banti |

| 8 January 2012 17 | Novara | 0–3 | Fiorentina | Novara |
| 15:00 CET (UTC+01:00) | Centurioni (yellow card) 19' | Report | Jovetić 20' (pen.), 50'; Nastasić (yellow card) 35'; Montolivo 42'; Salifu (yellow card) 68' | Stadium: Stadio Silvio Piola; Attendance: 10,984; Referee: Antonio Damato |

| 15 January 2012 18 | Fiorentina | 0–1 | Lecce | Florence |
| 15:00 CET (UTC+01:00) | Cassani (yellow card) 65'; Rômulo (yellow card) 85'; Montolivo (yellow card) 87' | Report | Giacomazzi (yellow card) 48'; Di Michele 66' (pen.); Esposito (yellow card) 90+2' | Stadium: Stadio Artemio Franchi; Attendance: 18,474; Referee: Gianpaolo Calvarese |

| 22 January 2012 19 | Cagliari | 0–0 | Fiorentina | Cagliari |
| 15:00 CET (UTC+01:00) | El Kabir (yellow card) 80'; Cossu (yellow card) 85'; Conti (yellow card) 85' | Report | Salifu (yellow card) 17'; Cassani (yellow card) 33'; Nastasić (yellow card) 42'; Natali (yellow card) 80'; Munari (yellow card) 85' | Stadium: Stadio Sant'Elia; Referee: Andrea Gervasoni |

| 29 January 2012 20 | Fiorentina | 2–1 | Siena | Florence |
| 12:30 CET (UTC+01:00) | Jovetić 4'; Natali 63'; Nastasić (yellow card) 88' | Report | Brienza (yellow card) 47'; Del Grosso (yellow card) 62'; Calaiò 89' | Stadium: Stadio Artemio Franchi; Attendance: 16,784; Referee: Mauro Bergonzi |

| 21 February 2012 21 | Bologna | 2–0 | Fiorentina | Bologna |
| 18:30 CET (UTC+01:00) | Diamanti 30', (yellow card) 61'; Ramírez 43' | Report | Gamberini (yellow card) 20'; Vargas (yellow card) 32'; Olivera (red card) 50'; Cassani (yellow card) 84' | Stadium: Stadio Renato Dall'Ara; Attendance: 14,120; Referee: Antonio Danilo Giannoccaro |

| 5 February 2012 22 | Fiorentina | 3–2 | Udinese | Florence |
| 15:00 CET (UTC+01:00) | Lazzari (yellow card) 19'; Jovetić 39' (pen.), 84' (pen.); Cassani 56'; Montolivo (yellow card) 57' | Report | Di Natale 14'; Torje 89' | Stadium: Stadio Artemio Franchi; Attendance: 16,684; Referee: Paolo Mazzoleni |

| 7 March 2012 23 | Parma | 2–2 | Fiorentina | Parma |
| 18:30 CET (UTC+01:00) | Okaka 28'; Valdés (yellow card) 45+1'; Giovinco 87' (pen.); Morrone (yellow card) 90+3' | Report | Nastasić 60', (yellow card) 90+1'; Cerci 71'; Cassani (yellow card) 86'; Behrami (yellow card) 87'; Pasqual (yellow card) 87' | Stadium: Stadio Ennio Tardini; Attendance: 12,916; Referee: Nicola Rizzoli |

| 17 February 2012 24 | Fiorentina | 0–3 | Napoli | Florence |
| 20:45 CET (UTC+01:00) | Amauri (yellow card) 45+3'; Olivera (yellow card) 45+3' | Report | Britos (yellow card) 34'; Hamšík (yellow card) 35'; Cavani 3', 55'; Rosati (yellow card) 73'; Lavezzi 90+1' | Stadium: Stadio Artemio Franchi; Attendance: 20,042; Referee: Daniele Orsato |

| 26 February 2012 25 | Lazio | 1–0 | Fiorentina | Rome |
| 20:45 CET (UTC+01:00) | Klose 35'; Biava (yellow card) 50' | Report | Cerci (yellow card) 52' | Stadium: Stadio Olimpico; Attendance: 26,091; Referee: Christian Brighi |

| 4 March 2012 26 | Fiorentina | 2–0 | Cesena | Florence |
| 20:45 CET (UTC+01:00) | Amauri (yellow card) 18'; Moras 61' (o.g.); Nastasić 74' | Report | Moras (yellow card) 59'; Comotto (yellow card) 90+3' | Stadium: Stadio Artemio Franchi; Attendance: 26,834; Referee: Marco Guida |

| 11 March 2012 27 | Catania | 1–0 | Fiorentina | Catania |
| 20:45 CET (UTC+01:00) | Lodi 58' | Report | Gamberini (yellow card) 57'; Amauri (yellow card) 88' | Stadium: Stadio Angelo Massimino; Attendance: 12,940; Referee: Daniele Doveri |

| 17 March 2012 28 | Fiorentina | 0–5 | Juventus | Florence |
| 20:45 CET (UTC+01:00) | Cerci (red card) 21'; Olivera (yellow card) 34' | Report | Vučinić 15'; Lichtsteiner (yellow card) 24'; Vidal 27'; Marchisio 54'; Pirlo 67'; Padoin 72' | Stadium: Stadio Artemio Franchi; Attendance: 36,387; Referee: Mauro Bergonzi |

| 25 March 2012 29 | Genoa | 2–2 | Fiorentina | Genoa |
| 20:45 CEST (UTC+02:00) | Belluschi 20'; Palacio 89' | Report | Montolivo 31'; Behrami (yellow card) 54'; Gamberini (yellow card) 61'; Natali 69'; Pasqual (yellow card) 85'; Boruc (yellow card) 89' | Stadium: Stadio Luigi Ferraris; Attendance: 20,200; Referee: Christian Brighi |

| 1 April 2012 30 | Fiorentina | 1–2 | Chievo | Florence |
| 20:45 CEST (UTC+02:00) | Montolivo (yellow card) 30'; Jovetić (yellow card) 52'; Marchionni (yellow card) 64'; Ljajić 71' | Report | Cesar (yellow card) 21'; Pellissier 24'; Dainelli (yellow card) 28'; Rigoni (yellow card) 41', (goal) 88' | Stadium: Stadio Artemio Franchi; Attendance: 19,791; Referee: Nicola Rizzoli |

| 7 April 2012 31 | Milan | 1–2 | Fiorentina | Milan |
| 20:45 CEST (UTC+02:00) | Ambrosini (yellow card) 7'; Bonera (yellow card) 11'; Ibrahimović 31' (pen.); Aquilani (yellow card) 82' | Report | Pasqual (yellow card) 7'; Nastasić (yellow card) 30'; Jovetić 47'; Amauri 89'; Boruc (yellow card) 90'; De Silvestri (yellow card) 90+5' | Stadium: San Siro; Attendance: 58,646; Referee: Domenico Celi |

| 11 April 2012 32 | Fiorentina | 0–0 | Palermo | Florence |
| 20:45 CEST (UTC+02:00) | Amauri (yellow card) 81'; Jovetić (yellow card) 87' | Report | Bačinović (yellow card) 56'; Iličić (yellow card) 62' | Stadium: Stadio Artemio Franchi; Attendance: 20,037; Referee: Daniele Doveri |

| 15 April 2012 33 | Roma | 1–2 | Fiorentina | Rome |
| 20:45 CEST (UTC+02:00) | José Ángel (yellow card) 25'; Totti (yellow card) 41', (goal) 71'; De Rossi (yellow card) 90+1'; Osvaldo (red card) 90+3' | Report | Jovetić 2'; Boruc (yellow card) 58'; De Silvestri (yellow card) 82'; Behrami (yellow card) 88'; Natali (yellow card) 90+1'; Lazzari 90+2' | Stadium: Stadio Olimpico; Attendance: 36,287; Referee: Christian Brighi |

| 22 April 2012 34 | Fiorentina | 0–0 | Internazionale | Florence |
| 12:30 CEST (UTC+02:00) | Nastasić (yellow card) 45'; Acosty (yellow card) 73'; Pasqual (yellow card) 77'; Cerci (yellow card) 84' | Report | Chivu (yellow card) 16'; Milito (yellow card) 45'; Júlio César (yellow card) 68'; Lúcio (yellow card) 80'; Zárate (yellow card) 89' | Stadium: Stadio Artemio Franchi; Attendance: 23,567; Referee: Paolo Valeri |

| 29 April 2012 35 | Atalanta | 2–0 | Fiorentina | Bergamo |
| 15:00 CEST (UTC+02:00) | Denis 11'; Bonaventura 51'; Cazzola (yellow card) 59'; Raimondi (yellow card) 66'; Manfredini (yellow card) 72'; Peluso (yellow card) 75' | Report | Cassani (yellow card) 38'; Camporese (yellow card) 40' | Stadium: Stadio Atleti Azzurri d'Italia; Attendance: 14,714; Referee: Daniele Doveri |

| 2 May 2012 36 | Fiorentina | 2–2 | Novara | Florence |
| 20:45 CEST (UTC+02:00) | Lazzari (yellow card) 30'; Montolivo 48' (pen.), 71'; Camporese (yellow card) 51'; Pasqual (yellow card) 68'; Olivera (yellow card) 78' | Report | Jeda 14', (yellow card) 25'; Rigoni 30' (pen.); Gemiti (yellow card) 47'; García (yellow card) 53'; Morganella (yellow card) 68' | Stadium: Stadio Artemio Franchi; Attendance: 18,132; Referee: Antonio Danilo Giannoccaro |

| 5 May 2012 37 | Lecce | 0–1 | Fiorentina | Lecce |
| 18:00 CEST (UTC+02:00) | Delvecchio (yellow card) 37'; Seferovic (yellow card) 64'; Esposito (yellow card) 84'; Migliónico (yellow card) 87' | Report | Cerci (yellow card) 35', (goal) 35'; Marchionni (yellow card) 49'; Felipe (yellow card) 78'; Boruc (yellow card) 90+6' | Stadium: Stadio Via del Mare; Attendance: 12,693; Referee: Christian Brighi |

| 13 May 2012 38 | Fiorentina | 0–0 | Cagliari | Florence |
| 18:00 CEST (UTC+02:00) | Cerci (yellow card) 59' | Report | Conti (yellow card) 25'; Dessena (yellow card) 62' | Stadium: Stadio Artemio Franchi; Attendance: 17,787; Referee: Emiliano Gallione |

=== Coppa Italia ===
| 21 August 2011 Third round | Fiorentina | 2–1 | Cittadella | Florence |
| 18:00 CEST (UTC+02:00) | Gilardino 10'; Cerci 47'; De Silvestri (yellow card) 63' | | Schiavon (yellow card) 26'; Di Carmine 36'; De Vito (yellow card) 68'; Job (yellow card) 77' | Stadium: Stadio Artemio Franchi; Attendance: 6,000; Referee: Carmine Russo |

| 24 November 2011 Fourth round | Fiorentina | 2–1 | Empoli | Florence |
| 18:00 CET (UTC+01:00) | Cerci 28', 37' | | Shekiladze 65' | Stadium: Stadio Artemio Franchi; Attendance: 47,282; Referee: Daniele Doveri |

| 11 January 2012 Round of 16 | Roma | 3–0 | Fiorentina | Rome |
| 20:45 CET (UTC+01:00) | Lamela 53', 66'; Borini 75' | | Ljajić (yellow card) 53' | Stadium: Stadio Olimpico; Attendance: 16,320; Referee: Andrea De Marco |

== Statistics ==
=== Appearances and goals ===
| No. | Pos | Nat | Player | Total | | Serie A | | Coppa Italia | |
| No. | Pos | Nat | Player | Apps | Goals | Apps | Goals | Apps | Goals |
Goalkeepers
| 1 | GK | (Poland) POL | Artur Boruc | 36 | 0 | 36 | 0 | 0 | 0 |
| 41 | GK | (Italy) ITA | Luca Lezzerini | 0 | 0 | 0 | 0 | 0 | 0 |
| 89 | GK | (Brazil) BRA | Neto | 4 | 0 | 2 | 0 | 2 | 0 |
Defenders
| 5 | DF | (Italy) ITA | Alessandro Gamberini | 29 | 1 | 29 | 1 | 0 | 0 |
| 14 | DF | (Italy) ITA | Cesare Natali | 35 | 2 | 35 | 2 | 0 | 0 |
| 15 | DF | (Serbia) SRB | Matija Nastasić | 25 | 2 | 21+4 | 2 | 0 | 0 |
| 16 | DF | (Italy) ITA | Mattia Cassani | 26 | 1 | 24+2 | 1 | 0 | 0 |
| 19 | DF | (Brazil) BRA | Felipe | 3 | 0 | 2+1 | 0 | 0 | 0 |
| 23 | DF | (Italy) ITA | Manuel Pasqual | 32 | 0 | 32 | 0 | 0 | 0 |
| 29 | DF | (Italy) ITA | Lorenzo De Silvestri | 22 | 0 | 15+7 | 0 | 0 | 0 |
| 31 | DF | (Italy) ITA | Michele Camporese | 7 | 0 | 6+1 | 0 | 0 | 0 |
Midfielders
| 6 | MF | (Peru) PER | Juan Manuel Vargas | 24 | 0 | 18+6 | 0 | 0 | 0 |
| 10 | MF | (Uruguay) URU | Rubén Olivera | 0 | 0 | 0 | 0 | 0 | 0 |
| 13 | MF | (Morocco) MAR | Houssine Kharja | 19 | 0 | 10+9 | 0 | 0 | 0 |
| 17 | MF | (Ghana) GHA | Amidu Salifu | 14 | 0 | 6+8 | 0 | 0 | 0 |
| 18 | MF | (Italy) ITA | Riccardo Montolivo | 30 | 4 | 30 | 4 | 0 | 0 |
| 21 | MF | (Italy) ITA | Andrea Lazzari | 33 | 2 | 26+7 | 2 | 0 | 0 |
| 32 | MF | (Italy) ITA | Marco Marchionni | 8 | 0 | 3+5 | 0 | 0 | 0 |
| 85 | MF | (Switzerland) SUI | Valon Behrami | 31 | 0 | 31 | 0 | 0 | 0 |
| 92 | MF | (Brazil) BRA | Rômulo | 10 | 0 | 4+6 | 0 | 0 | 0 |
Forwards
| 7 | FW | (Italy) ITA | Alessio Cerci | 23 | 5 | 18+5 | 5 | 0 | 0 |
| 8 | FW | (Montenegro) MNE | Stevan Jovetić | 27 | 14 | 27 | 14 | 0 | 0 |
| 11 | FW | (Italy) ITA | Amauri | 13 | 1 | 13 | 1 | 0 | 0 |
| 22 | FW | (Serbia) SRB | Adem Ljajić | 15 | 1 | 9+6 | 1 | 0 | 0 |
| 26 | FW | (Brazil) BRA | Ryder Matos | 0 | 0 | 0 | 0 | 0 | 0 |
| 37 | FW | (Ghana) GHA | Boadu Maxwell Acosty | 5 | 0 | 0+5 | 0 | 0 | 0 |
Players transferred out during the season
| 9 | FW | (Senegal) SEN | Khouma Babacar | 1 | 0 | 0+1 | 0 | 0 | 0 |
| 10 | FW | (Uruguay) URU | Santiago Silva | 12 | 1 | 3+9 | 1 | 0 | 0 |
| 11 | FW | (Italy) ITA | Alberto Gilardino | 12 | 2 | 9+3 | 2 | 0 | 0 |
| 20 | MF | (Italy) ITA | Gianni Munari | 11 | 0 | 5+6 | 0 | 0 | 0 |

Last updated: 13 May 2012
Source: Competitions

=== Goalscorers ===
| Rank | Player | League | Coppa Italia | Total |
|---|---|---|---|---|
| 1 | (Montenegro) Stevan Jovetić | 14 | 0 | 14 |
| 2 | (Italy) Alessio Cerci | 4 | 3 | 7 |
| 3 | (Serbia) Matija Nastasić | 2 | 0 | 2 |

Last updated: 10 March 2012
