= 2013–14 Parma FC season =

Parma
2013–14 season
- President: Tommaso Ghirardi
- Manager: Roberto Donadoni
- Stadium: Stadio Ennio Tardini
- Serie A: 6th
- Coppa Italia: Round of 16
- Top goalscorer: League: Antonio Cassano (12); All: Antonio Cassano (13)
- Average home league attendance: 13,451
Home colours	Away colours	Third colours

The 2013–14 season was Parma Football Club's 23rd season in Serie A and their 5th consecutive season in the top-flight of Italian football, after having been promoted from Serie B in 2009–10. The club enjoyed one of their best seasons in recent years, finishing 6th.

== Players ==
=== Squad information ===
Note: Flags indicate national team as defined under FIFA eligibility rules; some limited exceptions apply. Players may hold more than one non-FIFA nationality.

No.	Pos.	Nation	Player
1	GK	ITA	Nicola Pavarini
2	DF	ITA	Mattia Cassani (on loan from Fiorentina)
3	DF	ITA	Cristian Molinaro
5	MF	URU	Walter Gargano (on loan from Napoli)
6	DF	ITA	Alessandro Lucarelli (captain)
7	FW	FRA	Jonathan Biabiany
8	MF	ITA	Daniele Galloppa
10	FW	ITA	Nicola Pozzi
11	FW	ITA	Amauri
16	MF	ITA	Marco Parolo
17	FW	ITA	Raffaele Palladino
18	DF	ITA	Massimo Gobbi
19	DF	BRA	Felipe

No.	Pos.	Nation	Player
21	FW	ITA	Nicola Sansone
22	MF	SRB	Filip Janković
23	MF	ITA	Ezequiel Schelotto (on loan from Inter)
26	MF	ARG	José Mauri
29	DF	ITA	Gabriel Paletta
30	MF	GHA	Afriyie Acquah (on loan from Hoffenheim)
31	MF	ITA	Luca Cigarini
32	MF	ITA	Marco Marchionni
43	FW	ITA	Alberto Paloschi
44	FW	ITA	Alberto Cerri
83	GK	ITA	Antonio Mirante
91	GK	SVK	Pavol Bajza
99	FW	ITA	Antonio Cassano

== Competitions ==
=== Serie A ===
==== League table ====
Pos	Team	Pld	W	D	L	GF	GA	GD	Pts	Qualification or relegation
4	Fiorentina	38	19	8	11	65	44	+21	65	Qualification for the Europa League group stage (Note: Since the 2013–14 Coppa Italia champions Napoli and runners–up Fiorentina qualified for the 2014–15 European football season thus 4th, 5th and 6th in Serie A (barring any failure to receive a "UEFA licence" from the FIGC or a ban from European competition) would qualify for group stage, play-off round and third qualifying round respectively.)
5	Internazionale	38	15	15	8	62	39	+23	60	Qualification for the Europa League play-off round
6	Parma	38	15	13	10	58	46	+12	58	
7	Torino	38	15	12	11	58	48	+10	57 (Note: Torino finished ahead of Milan on goal difference : Torino 2-2 Milan, Milan 1-1 Torino; Torino = +10, Milan = +8.)	Qualification for the Europa League third qualifying round (Note: The FIGC rejected the application of Parma for a UEFA licence, because Parma had overdue tax debt; their place went to seventh-place Torino, which had a UEFA licence.)
8	Milan	38	16	9	13	57	49	+8	57	

Source: Serie A, Soccerway
Rules for classification: 1st points; 2nd head-to-head points; 3rd head-to-head goal difference; 4th goal difference; 5th number of goals scored; 6th public draw.
(Head-to-head record is applied for clubs with the same number of points only once all matches between said clubs have been played)

==== Results summary ====
Overall								Home						Away					
Pld	W	D	L	GF	GA	GD	Pts	W	D	L	GF	GA	GD	W	D	L	GF	GA	GD
38	15	13	10	58	46	+12	58	9	7	3	27	18	+9	6	6	7	31	28	+3

Last updated: 18 May 2014.
Source: Competitive matches

==== Results by round ====
Round	1	2	3	4	5	6	7	8	9	10	11	12	13	14	15	16	17	18	19	20	21	22	23	24	25	26	27	28	29	30	31	32	33	34	35	36	37	38
Ground	H	A	H	A	H	A	H	A	H	A	H	H	A	H	A	H	A	H	A	A	H	A	H	A	H	A	H	A	H	A	A	H	A	H	A	H	A	H
Result	D	L	L	D	W	D	W	L	W	L	L	D	W	D	D	D	D	W	W	W	W	L	D	W	D	W	W	W	D	L	L	W	D	L	L	W	D	W
Position	11	16	16	18	13	14	10	13	8	11	13	11	9	8	10	11	8	8	8	8	7	8	8	6	7	6	6	6	5	6	6	6	6	6	9	7	7	6

Updated to match(es) played on 18 May 2014. Source: Competitive matches
A = Away; H = Home; W = Win; D = Draw; L = Loss

==== Matches ====
25 August 2013 1	Parma	0–0	Chievo	Parma
20:45 CEST (UTC+02:00)	Marchionni (yellow card) 54'; Cassani (yellow card) 73'	Report	Radovanović (yellow card) 54'; Hetemaj (yellow card) 77'; Sardo (yellow card) 77'	Stadium: Stadio Ennio Tardini; Attendance: 11,276; Referee: Nicola Rizzoli

1 September 2013 2	Udinese	3–1	Parma	Udine
15:00 CEST (UTC+02:00)	Badu 11'; Heurtaux 72'; Muriel 89' (pen.)	Report	Cassani (yellow card) 49'; Cassano 82', (yellow card) 90'; Mendes (yellow card) 87'; Lucarelli (yellow card) 88'	Stadium: Stadio Friuli; Attendance: 9,750; Referee: Emilio Ostinelli

16 September 2013 3	Parma	1–3	Roma	Parma
20:45 CEST (UTC+02:00)	Biabiany 39'; Lucarelli (yellow card) 41'; Cassano (yellow card) 50'; Cassani (yellow card) 84'; Gargano (yellow card) 90+3'	Report	Florenzi 47'; Totti 70'; Strootman 85' (pen.)	Stadium: Stadio Ennio Tardini; Attendance: 13,118; Referee: Marco Guida

22 September 2013 4	Catania	0–0	Parma	Catania
15:00 CEST (UTC+02:00)		Report	Marchionni (yellow card) 21'; Felipe (yellow card) 53'; Cassani (yellow card) 68'	Stadium: Stadio Angelo Massimino; Attendance: 13,125; Referee: Paolo Mazzoleni

25 September 2013 5	Parma	4–3	Atalanta	Parma
20:45 CEST (UTC+02:00)	Mesbah 19', (yellow card) 22'; Parolo 28', 40'; Rosi 35'; Benalouane (yellow card) 49'; Amauri (red card) 52'; Marchionni (yellow card) 56'	Report	Bonaventura 20'; Denis 44'; Raimondi (yellow card) 63'; Stendardo (yellow card) 71'; Livaja 78'; Del Grosso (yellow card) 78'; Yepes (yellow card) 90'	Stadium: Stadio Ennio Tardini; Attendance: 10,409; Referee: Andrea Gervasoni

30 September 2013 6	Fiorentina	2–2	Parma	Florence
20:45 CEST (UTC+02:00)	Aquilani (yellow card) 27'; Gonzalo 64', (yellow card) 69'; Pizarro (yellow card) 65'; Vargas 78'	Report	Marchionni (yellow card) 20'; Lucarelli (yellow card) 42'; Gargano 45+1'; Gobbi 90+2'	Stadium: Stadio Artemio Franchi; Attendance: 28,524; Referee: Davide Massa

6 October 2013 7	Parma	3–1	Sassuolo	Parma
12:30 CEST (UTC+02:00)	Palladino 32'; Rosi (yellow card) 36', (goal) 70'; Mirante (red card) 45+4'; Gargano (yellow card) 45+6'; Cassano 76'; Acquah (yellow card) 90+2'	Report	Berardi (yellow card) 35', (goal) 45+6' (pen.); Kurtić (yellow card) 66'; Magnanelli (yellow card) 87' (yellow-red card) 88'	Stadium: Stadio Ennio Tardini; Attendance: 10,500; Referee: Andrea De Marco

20 October 2013 8	Hellas Verona	3–2	Parma	Verona
15:00 CEST (UTC+02:00)	Cacciatore 9'; Jorginho 61' (pen.), 88' (pen.)	Report	Parolo 19', (yellow card) 27'; Felipe (yellow card) 23'; Cassano 25'; Rosi (yellow card) 30'; Gobbi (yellow card) 48'; Marchionni (yellow card) 50'; Cassani (yellow card) 60'; Acquah (yellow card) 79'	Stadium: Stadio Marc'Antonio Bentegodi; Attendance: 19,547; Referee: Maurizio Mariani

27 October 2013 9	Parma	3–2	Milan	Parma
15:00 CET (UTC+01:00)	Parolo 11', 90+4', (yellow card) 78'; Cassano 45+1'; Lucarelli (yellow card) 87'; Gargano (yellow card) 90'	Report	Balotelli (yellow card) 34'; Matri 61'; Silvestre 63'; De Jong (yellow card) 83'; Zapata (yellow card) 90+4'	Stadium: Stadio Ennio Tardini; Attendance: 16,686; Referee: Paolo Valeri

30 October 2013 10	Genoa	1–0	Parma	Genoa
20:45 CET (UTC+01:00)	Manfredini (yellow card) 42'; Antonelli (yellow card) 54'; Gilardino 57'; Antonini (yellow card) 85'	Report	Benalouane (yellow card) 59'; Mesbah (yellow card) 85'	Stadium: Stadio Luigi Ferraris; Attendance: 18,042; Referee: Carmine Russo

2 November 2013 11	Parma	0–1	Juventus	Parma
18:00 CET (UTC+01:00)	Mendes (yellow card) 34'; Gobbi (yellow card) 63'	Report	Marchisio (yellow card) 44'; Padoin (yellow card) 50'; Giovinco (yellow card) 53'; Pogba 77'; Llorente (yellow card) 80'	Stadium: Stadio Ennio Tardini; Attendance: 17,740; Referee: Domenico Celi

10 November 2013 12	Parma	1–1	Lazio	Parma
15:00 CET (UTC+01:00)	Lucarelli 64'; Parolo (yellow card) 72'; Felipe (yellow card) 80'; Rosi (red card) 86'	Report	Pereirinha (yellow card) 28'; Keita 50'; Klose (yellow card) 75'	Stadium: Stadio Ennio Tardini; Attendance: 11,139; Referee: Nicola Rizzoli

23 November 2013 13	Napoli	0–1	Parma	Naples
20:45 CET (UTC+01:00)	Higuaín (yellow card) 45'; Britos (yellow card) 79'	Report	Gargano (yellow card) 70'; Benalouane (yellow card) 74'; Cassano 81'	Stadium: Stadio San Paolo; Attendance: 36,400; Referee: Paolo Mazzoleni

30 November 2013 14	Parma	1–1	Bologna	Parma
18:00 CET (UTC+01:00)	Cassano 23', (yellow card) 32'; Cassani (yellow card) 28'; Paletta (yellow card) 35'; Lucarelli (yellow card) 46'; Marchionni (yellow card) 57'; Gobbi (yellow card) 89'	Report	Kone 10'; Pérez (yellow card) 32'; Sørensen (yellow card) 33' (yellow-red card) 53'; Garics (yellow card) 84'	Stadium: Stadio Ennio Tardini; Attendance: 11,973; Referee: Massimiliano Irrati

8 December 2013 15	Internazionale	3–3	Parma	Milan
20:45 CET (UTC+01:00)	Palacio 44', 54'; Ranocchia (yellow card) 52'; Guarín 56'; Kovačić (yellow card) 81'	Report	Parolo (yellow card) 9', (goal) 45+1'; Sansone 11', 59'	Stadium: San Siro; Attendance: 33,732; Referee: Paolo Valeri

15 December 2013 16	Parma	0–0	Cagliari	Parma
15:00 CET (UTC+01:00)	Cassano (yellow card) 36'; Mendes (yellow card) 54'; Valdés (yellow card) 58'; Lucarelli (yellow card) 66'	Report	Nainggolan (yellow card) 18'; Ekdal (yellow card) 53'; Nenê (yellow card) 62'; Rossettini (yellow card) 66'	Stadium: Stadio Ennio Tardini; Attendance: 12,713; Referee: Dino Tommasi

22 December 2013 17	Sampdoria	1–1	Parma	Genoa
15:00 CET (UTC+01:00)	Palombo (yellow card) 14'; Éder 44'; Mustafi (yellow card) 58'	Report	Gobbi (yellow card) 21'; Parolo (yellow card) 22'; Sansone (yellow card) 44'; Cassani (yellow card) 48'; Lucarelli 66'	Stadium: Stadio Luigi Ferraris; Attendance: 20,822; Referee: Marco Di Bello

6 January 2014 18	Parma	3–1	Torino	Parma
15:00 CET (UTC+01:00)	Cassani (yellow card) 14'; Marchionni 34'; Lucarelli 44'; Amauri 70'	Report	Vives (yellow card) 9'; Immobile 21'; Meggiorini (yellow card) 63'	Stadium: Stadio Ennio Tardini; Attendance: 12,367; Referee: Carmine Russo

11 January 2014 19	Livorno	0–3	Parma	Livorno
18:00 CET (UTC+01:00)	Mbaye (yellow card) 50'	Report	Palladino 2'; Lucarelli (yellow card) 31'; Amauri 86', 90+3' (pen.)	Stadium: Stadio Armando Picchi; Attendance: 9,039; Referee: Massimiliano Irrati

19 January 2014 20	Chievo	1–2	Parma	Verona
15:00 CET (UTC+01:00)	Paloschi 15'; Cesar (yellow card) 40'; Sardo (yellow card) 84'	Report	Cassano 27'; Lucarelli (yellow card) 35', (goal) 90+3'; Gargano (yellow card) 51'; Amauri (yellow card) 58'	Stadium: Stadio Marc'Antonio Bentegodi; Attendance: 6,000; Referee: Daniele Orsato

26 January 2014 21	Parma	1–0	Udinese	Parma
15:00 CET (UTC+01:00)	Parolo (yellow card) 7'; Felipe (yellow card) 9'; Amauri 35'; Acquah (yellow card) 78'	Report	Badu (yellow card) 11'; Allan (yellow card) 45+1'; Pinzi (yellow card) 90+2'	Stadium: Stadio Ennio Tardini; Attendance: 10,917; Referee: Sebastiano Peruzzo

9 February 2014 22	Parma	0–0	Catania	Parma
15:00 CET (UTC+01:00)	Marchionni (yellow card) 24'; Paletta (yellow card) 90+3'	Report	Bellusci (yellow card) 21'; Peruzzi (yellow card) 25'; Lodi (yellow card) 69'	Stadium: Stadio Ennio Tardini; Attendance: 10,609; Referee: Piero Giacomelli

16 February 2014 23	Atalanta	0–4	Parma	Bergamo
15:00 CET (UTC+01:00)	Benalouane (yellow card) 76'; Carmona (yellow card) 90+2'	Report	Molinaro 9', (yellow card) 28'; Acquah (yellow card) 12'; Parolo (yellow card) 52'; Benalouane 74' (o.g.); Cassano 77'; Schelotto (yellow card) 85', (goal) 90+3'	Stadium: Stadio Atleti Azzurri d'Italia; Attendance: 11,233; Referee: Dino Tommasi

24 February 2014 24	Parma	2–2	Fiorentina	Parma
19:00 CET (UTC+01:00)	Molinaro (yellow card) 31'; Cassano 39'; Amauri 51' (pen.); Gargano (yellow card) 56'; Mirante (yellow card) 78'; Paletta (yellow card) 90+2'; Munari (red card) 90+4'	Report	Diakité (yellow card) 26' (yellow-red card) 54'; Cuadrado 41'; Tomović (yellow card) 50'; Pizarro (yellow card) 51'; Fernández 85'; Savić (yellow card) 90+3'; Valero (red card) 90+4'	Stadium: Stadio Ennio Tardini; Attendance: 14,014; Referee: Andrea Gervasoni

2 March 2014 25	Sassuolo	0–1	Parma	Reggio Emilia
15:00 CET (UTC+01:00)	Zaza (yellow card) 40'; Berardi (red card) 72'; Gazzola (yellow card) 82'	Report	Parolo 1'; Lucarelli (yellow card) 40'	Stadium: Mapei Stadium – Città del Tricolore; Attendance: 11,693; Referee: Paolo Tagliavento

9 March 2014 26	Parma	2–0	Hellas Verona	Parma
15:00 CET (UTC+01:00)	Biabiany 20'; Gobbi (yellow card) 21'; Lucarelli (yellow card) 57'; Paletta (yellow card) 70'; Schelotto 90+2'	Report	Cirigliano (yellow card) 55'; Sala (yellow card) 75'	Stadium: Stadio Ennio Tardini; Attendance: 14,258; Referee: Andrea De Marco

16 March 2014 27	Milan	2–4	Parma	Milan
15:00 CET (UTC+01:00)	Abbiati (red card) 5'; Bonera (yellow card) 30'; Mexès (yellow card) 39'; Rami 56', (yellow card) 82'; Balotelli 76' (pen.)	Report	Cassano 9' (pen.), 51'; Marchionni (yellow card) 67'; Obi (yellow card) 75'; Amauri 78'; Biabiany 90+5'	Stadium: San Siro; Attendance: 39,249; Referee: Domenico Celi

23 March 2014 28	Parma	1–1	Genoa	Parma
12:30 CET (UTC+01:00)	Schelotto 31'; Munari (yellow card) 56'; Lucarelli (yellow card) 85'	Report	Cofie 21'; Konaté (yellow card) 51'; Burdisso (yellow card) 60'; De Maio (yellow card) 67'	Stadium: Stadio Ennio Tardini; Attendance: 12,441; Referee: Dino Tommasi

26 March 2014 29	Juventus	2–1	Parma	Turin
20:45 CET (UTC+01:00)	Tevez 25', 32', (yellow card) 77'; Vidal (yellow card) 45'; Asamoah (yellow card) 45+1'	Report	Obi (yellow card) 11'; Molinaro 62'; Amauri (red card) 65'; Cassani (yellow card) 77'; Acquah (yellow card) 85'	Stadium: Juventus Stadium; Attendance: 38,535; Referee: Luca Banti

30 March 2014 30	Lazio	3–2	Parma	Rome
15:00 CEST (UTC+02:00)	Lulić 15'; Cana (yellow card) 35'; Onazi (yellow card) 43'; Klose 67'; Candreva 90+3', (yellow card) 90+3'	Report	Biabiany 26'; Lucarelli (yellow card) 47'; Felipe (yellow card) 64'; Cassano (yellow card) 66'; Ciani 81' (o.g.)	Stadium: Stadio Olimpico; Attendance: 26,531; Referee: Antonio Damato

2 April 2014 31	Roma	4–2	Parma	Rome
18:30 CEST (UTC+02:00)	Gervinho 12'; Totti 16'; Pjanić 49'; Taddei 82', (yellow card) 83'	Report	Acquah 15'; Mauri (yellow card) 87'; Biabiany 90'	Stadium: Stadio Olimpico; Attendance: 41,265; Referee: Andrea De Marco
Note: Postponed from 2 February because of excessive rain.

6 April 2014 32	Parma	1–0	Napoli	Parma
20:45 CEST (UTC+02:00)	Cassani (yellow card) 24'; Parolo 55', (yellow card) 78'; Marchionni (yellow card) 60'; Acquah (yellow card) 63'; Mirante (yellow card) 88'	Report	Zapata (yellow card) 76'; Albiol (yellow card) 79'	Stadium: Stadio Ennio Tardini; Attendance: 14,743; Referee: Mauro Bergonzi

13 April 2014 33	Bologna	1–1	Parma	Bologna
12:30 CEST (UTC+02:00)	Cherubin 44'; Pazienza (yellow card) 78'; Morleo (yellow card) 82'; Garics (yellow card) 90+2'	Report	Palladino 79'; Lucarelli (yellow card) 85'	Stadium: Stadio Renato Dall'Ara; Attendance: 21,379; Referee: Daniele Doveri

19 April 2014 34	Parma	0–2	Internazionale	Parma
15:00 CEST (UTC+02:00)	Paletta (yellow card) 20' (yellow-red card) 46'; Lucarelli (yellow card) 47'	Report	Samuel (yellow card) 6'; Rolando 48', (yellow card) 79'; Hernanes (yellow card) 85'; Guarín 89'	Stadium: Stadio Ennio Tardini; Attendance: 16,289; Referee: Gianluca Rocchi

27 April 2014 35	Cagliari	1–0	Parma	Cagliari
15:00 CEST (UTC+02:00)	Pinilla 35' (pen.), (yellow card) 87'	Report	Felipe (red card) 53'; Gobbi (yellow card) 62'; Cassani (yellow card) 66'	Stadium: Stadio Sant'Elia; Attendance: 4,798; Referee: Andrea Gervasoni

4 May 2014 36	Parma	2–0	Sampdoria	Parma
15:00 CEST (UTC+02:00)	Cassano 8'; Molinaro (yellow card) 39'; Paletta (yellow card) 39'; Schelotto 90', (yellow card) 90+1'	Report	Okaka (yellow card) 46'	Stadium: Stadio Ennio Tardini; Attendance: 17,614; Referee: Piero Giacomelli

11 May 2014 37	Torino	1–1	Parma	Turin
15:00 CEST (UTC+02:00)	Immobile 42', (yellow card) 64' (yellow-red card) 73'; Bovo (yellow card) 50'; Glik (yellow card) 70'	Report	Parolo (yellow card) 61'; Lucarelli (red card) 64'; Biabiany 71'; Acquah (yellow card) 89'	Stadium: Stadio Olimpico di Torino; Attendance: 25,559; Referee: Antonio Damato

18 May 2014 38	Parma	2–0	Livorno	Parma
20:45 CEST (UTC+02:00)	Amauri 62', 80'	Report	Ceccherini (yellow card) 28'; Rinaudo (yellow card) 63'; Emerson (yellow card) 63'	Stadium: Stadio Ennio Tardini; Attendance: 16,763; Referee: Andrea De Marco

=== Coppa Italia ===
17 August 2013 Third round	Parma	4–0	Lecce	Parma
20:45 CEST (UTC+02:00)	Amauri 21'; Cassano 53' (pen.); Munari 81'; Palladino 85'			Stadium: Stadio Ennio Tardini; Attendance: 3,949; Referee: Mauro Bergonzi

3 December 2013 Fourth round	Parma	4–1	Varese	Parma
21:00 CET (UTC+01:00)	Valdés 5'; Munari 52'; Palladino 58'; Rosi 69'		Damonte 88'	Stadium: Stadio Ennio Tardini; Attendance: 1,420; Referee: Claudio Gavillucci

14 January 2014 Round of 16	Lazio	2–1	Parma	Rome
21:00 CET (UTC+01:00)	Perea 25', 90+1'		Biabiany 43'	Stadium: Stadio Olimpico; Attendance: 6,667; Referee: Andrea Gervasoni

== Statistics ==
=== Appearances and goals ===
No.	Pos	Nat	Player	Total		Serie A		Coppa Italia	
No.	Pos	Nat	Player	Apps	Goals	Apps	Goals	Apps	Goals
Goalkeepers
1	GK	(Italy) ITA	Nicola Pavarini	1	0	0+1	0	0	0
83	GK	(Italy) ITA	Antonio Mirante	37	0	36	0	1	0
91	GK	(Slovakia) SVK	Pavol Bajza	5	0	2+1	0	2	0
Defenders
2	DF	(Italy) ITA	Mattia Cassani	38	0	35+1	0	2	0
3	DF	(Italy) ITA	Cristian Molinaro	16	2	11+5	2	0	0
6	DF	(Italy) ITA	Alessandro Lucarelli	34	4	34	4	0	0
18	DF	(Italy) ITA	Massimo Gobbi	30	1	26+2	1	2	0
19	DF	(Brazil) BRA	Felipe	25	0	19+3	0	3	0
29	DF	(Argentina) ARG	Gabriel Paletta	23	0	19+2	0	2	0
31	DF	(Colombia) COL	Jherson Vergara	0	0	0	0	0	0
35	DF	(Switzerland) SUI	Jonathan Rossini	0	0	0	0	0	0
Midfielders
5	MF	(Uruguay) URU	Walter Gargano	23	1	20+2	1	1	0
8	MF	(Italy) ITA	Daniele Galloppa	1	0	0+1	0	0	0
16	MF	(Italy) ITA	Marco Parolo	38	8	36	8	2	0
20	MF	(Nigeria) NGA	Joel Obi	8	0	2+6	0	0	0
22	MF	(Serbia) SRB	Filip Janković	0	0	0	0	0	0
23	MF	(Italy) ITA	Ezequiel Schelotto	16	4	6+10	4	0	0
24	MF	(Italy) ITA	Gianni Munari	13	2	2+9	0	1+1	2
26	MF	(Italy) ITA	José Mauri	3	0	0+2	0	0+1	0
30	MF	(Ghana) GHA	Afriyie Acquah	28	1	18+9	1	1	0
32	MF	(Italy) ITA	Marco Marchionni	35	1	32+1	1	2	0
Forwards
7	FW	(France) FRA	Jonathan Biabiany	38	7	32+4	6	2	1
9	FW	(Italy) ITA	Alberto Cerri	1	0	0+1	0	0	0
10	FW	(Italy) ITA	Nicola Pozzi	0	0	0	0	0	0
11	FW	(Italy) ITA	Amauri	33	9	20+11	8	2	1
17	FW	(Italy) ITA	Raffaele Palladino	27	5	11+13	3	1+2	2
99	FW	(Italy) ITA	Antonio Cassano	36	13	33+1	12	2	1
Players transferred out during the season
3	DF	(Algeria) ALG	Djamel Mesbah	4	1	2+1	1	1	0
10	MF	(Chile) CHI	Jaime Valdés	8	1	5+1	0	2	1
14	FW	(Italy) ITA	Stefano Okaka	2	0	0+2	0	0	0
21	FW	(Italy) ITA	Nicola Sansone	19	2	6+11	2	1+1	0
23	DF	(Portugal) POR	Pedro Mendes	8	0	4+2	0	1+1	0
25	DF	(France) FRA	Mory Koné	1	0	0	0	0+1	0
28	DF	(Tunisia) TUN	Yohan Benalouane	5	0	2+2	0	1	0
87	DF	(Italy) ITA	Aleandro Rosi	12	3	5+6	2	1	1

Last updated: 30 May 2014
Source: BDFutbol
