= Afriyie Acquah =

Ghanaian footballer (born 1992)

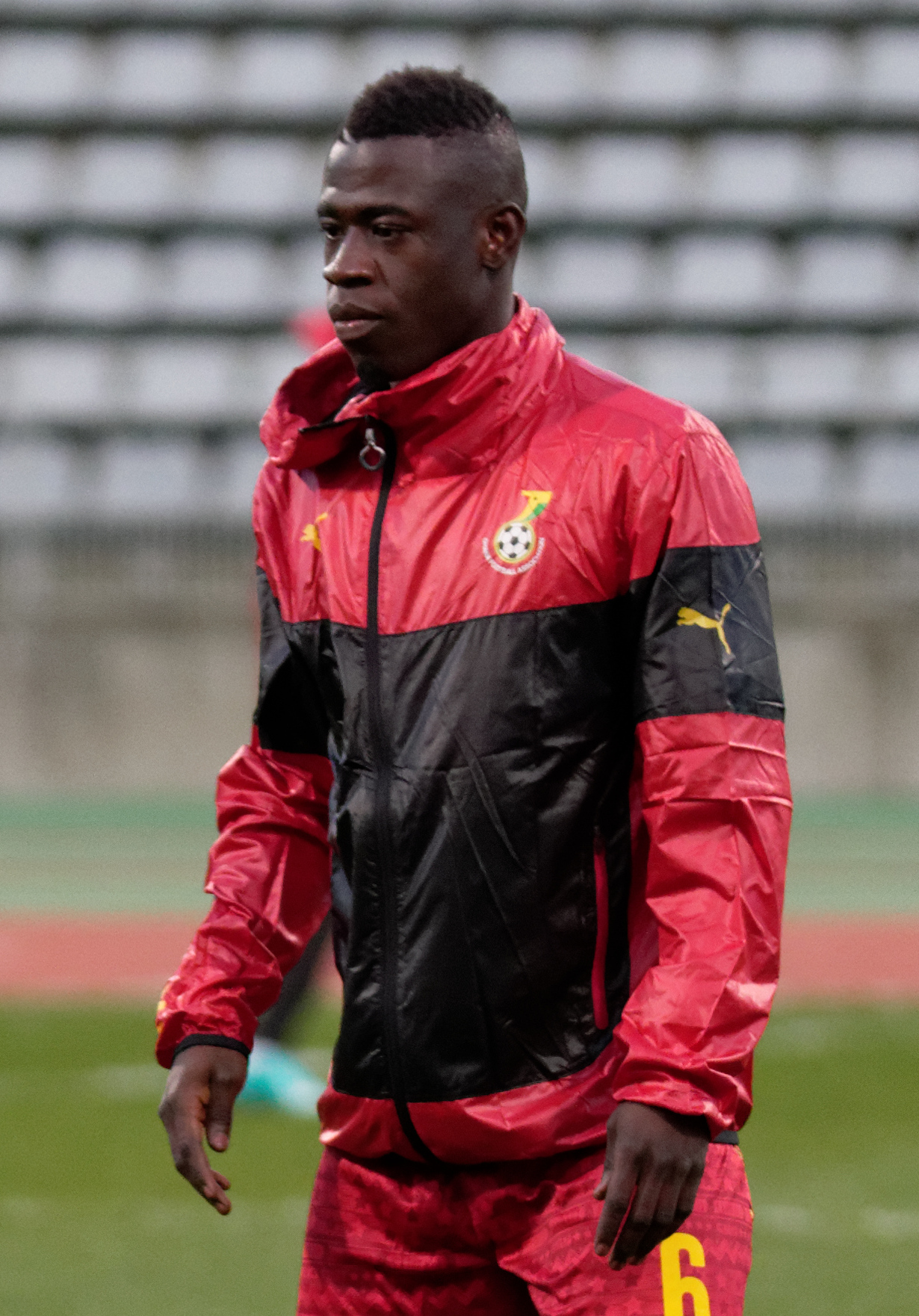
- Acquah with Ghana in 2015

Personal information
- Full name: Afriyie Acquah
- Date of birth: 5 January 1992 (age 34)
- Place of birth: Accra, Greater Accra, Ghana
- Height: 1.79 m (5 ft 10 in)
- Position: Midfielder

Youth career
- –2005: Goldfields
- 2005–2008: Glentoran
- 2008–2009: Mine Stars
- 2009: Bechem United
- 2009–2010: D.C. United Agogo
- 2010–2011: Palermo

Senior career*
Years	Team	Apps	(Gls)
2011–2013	Palermo	31	(0)
2012–2013	→ Parma (loan)	13	(0)
2013–2015	1899 Hoffenheim	0	(0)
2013–2015	→ Parma (loan)	41	(1)
2015	→ Sampdoria (loan)	10	(1)
2015–2018	Torino	71	(5)
2018–2019	Empoli	28	(2)
2019–2021	Yeni Malatyaspor	60	(3)
2021–2022	Al-Batin	8	(0)
2023	Al-Quwa Al-Jawiya		
2023–2024	Chitwan	8	(0)

International career
2012–2021	Ghana	39	(1)
- * Club domestic league appearances and goals

Afriyie Acquah (/æˈfriːi æxˈwɑː/ af-REE-ee akh-WAH; born 5 January 1992) is a Ghanaian professional footballer who plays as a midfielder.

== Early life ==
He speaks Italian, having learnt from his private tutor since he moved to Italy in 2010 and has a brother. Acquah said he had chosen shirt 94 in dedication to his mother, who was involved in a car accident and survived that year.

== Club career ==
=== Early career ===
Born in Accra, Greater Accra, Ghana, Acquah began his career at Glentoran Football Academy in Sunyani, Ghana, which was established by Christopher Forsythe an Irish National from Sunyani. During his Glentoran career, Acquah was awarded "Best Ghanaian Midfielder Under-14".

He later transferred to Bechem United as the Northern Irish club was unable to sign him, due to work permit issues, despite travelling with Christopher Forsythe to Belfast to train with the first team. In April 2009, he played for Bechem United against Italian club Empoli.

=== Palermo ===
On 1 February 2010, Palermo signed Acquah from Ghanaian club D.C. United Agogo for free, but €500,000 agent fee went to SCMG Sport Consulting & Management GmbH. Palermo was fined by FIGC as it violated the third-party ownership rule in April 2012. FIGC found that Acquah had signed a contract with the agent in June 2009 as he was unable to join any club aboard until he turned 18.

After choosing the number 94 shirt, Acquah made his Palermo debut, coming on as a substitute for Giulio Migliaccio in the 32nd minute, in a 4–2 loss against Fiorentina on 13 February 2011. After making four appearances by the start of April, Acquah signed a five-year contract, keeping him until 2016.

==== Parma (loan) ====
On 16 July 2012, Palermo announced to have loaned Acquah to Serie A rivals Parma for €100,000; the agreement also includes an option for Parma to acquire half of the player's transfer rights by the end of the season.

=== Hoffenheim ===
In January 2013 moved to German Bundesliga club Hoffenheim for €2.5 million fee on a four-year deal but he was not given any opportunity to play a single match until the end of the 2012–13 season.

==== Return to Parma (loan) ====
In July 2013, he returned to Parma on a season-long loan deal and won his place back, finishing 27 league appearances in the 2013–14 season. During the season, Acquah scored his first professional goal of his career, in a 4–2 loss against Roma on 2 April 2014. Subsequently, the loan was extended for another year.

==== Sampdoria (loan) ====
In February 2015, his loan spell at Parma was terminated early and he moved to fellow Serie A side Sampdoria, again on loan. He made his Sampdoria debut, playing 90 minutes, in a 2–1 loss against Chievo.

=== Torino ===
On 19 June 2015, he was signed by Torino on a four-year contract.

=== Empoli ===
On 17 August 2018, Acquah signed with Serie A team Empoli.

=== Yeni Malatyaspor ===
On 23 August 2019, after his contract with Empoli ended, Acquah joined Turkish club Yeni Malatyaspor on a two-year contract with the option to extend for an extra year. After playing for a year, he was appointed as the deputy captain of the club and given his favourite number 6 jersey.

=== Al Batin ===
On 22 June 2021, Acquah signed a two-year deal with Saudi Arabian club Al Batin FC as a free agent after his contract with Yeni Malatyaspor expired. He was released on 1 January 2022.

=== Al-Quwa Al-Jawiya ===
On 1 February 2023, Acquah joined Iraqi club Al-Quwa Al-Jawiya.

== International career ==
On 26 February 2012, Acquah was called up to the Ghana squad to face Chile. Acquah made his senior Ghana debut against Chile on 29 February 2012, at the PPL Park in Chester, Pennsylvania, USA. On 13 October 2012, in Civo Stadium, Lilongwe he scored a goal for Ghana against Malawi.

In May 2014, Acquah was named in a provisional 26-man squad in the FIFA World Cup by Ghana manager James Kwesi Appiah. On 2 June 2014, Acquah was selected in Ghana's squad for the 2014 tournament. Acquah made his World Cup debut, coming on as a substitute for Mohammed Rabiu in the 76th minute, in a 2–1 loss against Portugal.

He went to the Africa Cup of Nations in 2015 Equatorial Guinea, where Ghana reached the final and lost to the Ivory Coast 9–8 on penalties after a 0–0 draw. Acquah was the Man of the Match but missed his penalty.

== Style of play ==
A strong, talented and tenacious player, Acquah usually plays as a defensive midfielder in front of the defense, due to his pace, physicality, stamina and abilities as a ball-winner. Although he is primarily known for his defensive coverage, he is a versatile player, who can play anywhere in midfield; he has also been used in more advanced roles, or as a central midfielder, where he is capable of helping his team both offensively and defensively due to his work-rate, composure, temperament, consistency, and ability to make attacking runs into the opposition's penalty area. Despite his lack of particularly notable technical skills, he has also been used as a deep-lying playmaker on occasion, due to his solid first touch, ability to set the tempo of his team's play and subsequently start attacking plays with long balls after winning back possession. Although naturally right-footed, he is capable of striking or passing the ball well with either foot. His precocious performances as youngster and energetic playing style in midfield have drawn comparisons with compatriot Michael Essien.

== Career statistics ==
=== Club ===
As of match played 26 May 2019

Appearances and goals by club, season and competition
Club	Season	League			Cup		Europe		Other		Total	
Club	Season	Division	Apps	Goals	Apps	Goals	Apps	Goals	Apps	Goals	Apps	Goals
Palermo	2010–11	Serie A	11	0	3	0	0	0	0	0	14	0
Palermo	2011–12	Serie A	20	0	1	0	2	0	0	0	23	0
Palermo	Total		31	0	4	0	2	0	—		37	0
Parma (loan)	2012–13	Serie A	13	0	0	0	—		—		13	0
1899 Hoffenheim	2012–13	Bundesliga	0	0	0	0	—		—		0	0
Parma	2013–14	Serie A	27	1	1	0	—		—		28	1
Parma	2014–15	Serie A	14	0	0	0	—		—		14	0
Parma	Total		54	1	1	0	—		—		55	1
Sampdoria	2014–15	Serie A	10	1	—		—		—		10	1
Torino	2015–16	Serie A	29	2	2	1	—		—		31	3
Torino	2016–17	Serie A	20	2	2	0	—		—		22	2
Torino	2017–18	Serie A	22	1	4	0	—		—		26	1
Torino	Total		71	5	8	1	—		—		79	6
Empoli	2018–19	Serie A	28	2	0	0	—		—		28	2
Career total			194	9	13	1	2	0	0	0	209	10

=== International ===
As of 25 March 2021

Appearances and goals by national team and year
National team	Year	Apps	Goals
Ghana	2012	3	1
Ghana	2013	0	0
Ghana	2014	5	0
Ghana	2015	11	0
Ghana	2016	5	0
Ghana	2017	6	0
Ghana	2018	3	0
Ghana	2019	3	0
Ghana	2020	2	0
Ghana	2021	1	0
Total		39	1

== Honors ==
Al-Quwa Al-Jawiya

- Iraq FA Cup: 2022–23

Ghana

- Africa Cup of Nations runner-up: 2015
