= Ahinful =

Ahinful is a surname. Notable people with the surname include:

- Augustine Ahinful (born 1974), Ghanaian footballer
- Kwaku Duah Ahinful (born 1985), Ghanaian footballer
