= Kwaku Duah Ahinful =

Ghanaian football striker

Kwaku Duah
Personal information
- Full name: Kwaku Duah Ahinful
- Date of birth: March 19, 1985 (age 41)
- Place of birth: Prestea, Ghana
- Position: Midfielder

Team information
- Current team: Ashanti Gold SC
- Number: 17

Senior career*
Years	Team	Apps	(Gls)
2002–2005	Mine Stars	87	(10)
2006–2008	Ashanti Gold SC	34	(8)
2008–	Berekum Arsenal	3	(0)
- * Club domestic league appearances and goals ‡ National team caps and goals as of June 28, 2008

Kwaku Duah Ahinful (born March 19, 1985) is a Ghanaian football striker, who currently plays for Berekum Arsenal.

== Career ==
Ahninful began his career in his hometown Prestea with Mine Stars and joined in 2006 to Ashanti Gold SC, he signed on 11 July 2008 for Berekum Arsenal and left Ashanti Gold SC.
