= Gianni Munari =

Italian footballer (born 1983)

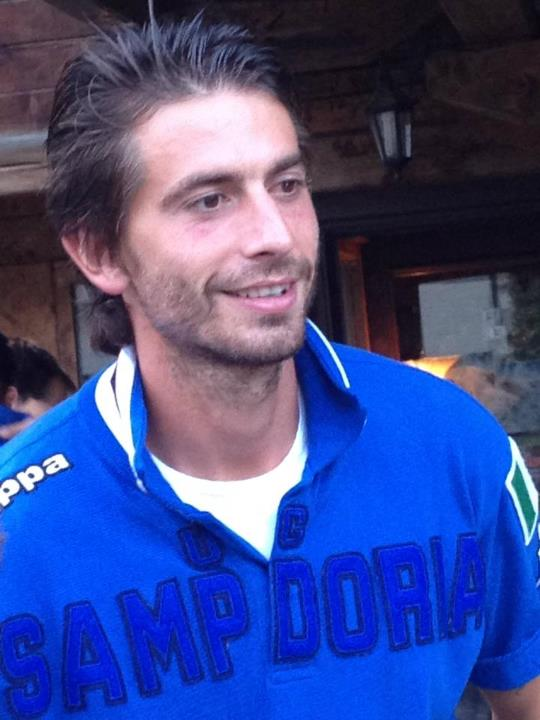
- Munari with Sampdoria

Personal information
- Date of birth: 24 June 1983 (age 43)
- Place of birth: Sassuolo, Italy
- Height: 1.90 m (6 ft 3 in)
- Position: Midfielder

Youth career
- Sassuolo

Senior career*
Years	Team	Apps	(Gls)
2001–2003	Sassuolo	49	(2)
2003–2004	Giulianova	25	(3)
2004–2005	Chievo	0	(0)
2004–2005	→ Triestina (loan)	35	(5)
2005–2006	Verona	38	(4)
2006–2007	Palermo	0	(0)
2007–2011	Lecce	143	(16)
2011–2012	Fiorentina	11	(0)
2012–2013	Sampdoria	47	(4)
2013–2015	Parma	11	(0)
2014–2015	→ Watford (loan)	28	(3)
2015–2017	Cagliari	31	(2)
2017–2019	Parma	46	(4)
2019	→ Verona (loan)	2	(0)
Total		466	(43)
- * Club domestic league appearances and goals

Gianni Munari (born 24 June 1983) is an Italian football official and a former player who played as a midfielder. He works as a scout for Parma.

== Career ==
=== From Sassuolo to Palermo ===
Munari started his career with hometown club Sassuolo, after being promoted to the senior squad from the youth team. He scored 2 goals in 49 appearances during his two-year spell with the club. In 2003, he joined Giulianova (via Chievo in co-ownership deal), where he would spend just one season, scoring three goals in 25 total appearances. He then joined Serie B side Triestina in 2004 in temporary deal with option to co-own the player. He had an impressive season, making 35 appearances and scoring 5 goals in his only season with the Trieste-based club. In June 2005 Triestina excised the option for €175,000. He was snapped up by another Serie B club on 30 August 2005 in the form of Verona, (which Verona bought Munari from Triestina for €350,000) where he managed to make 38 appearances and score 4 goals in one season. In June 2006 Verona acquired Munari outright from the cross-town rival for an undisclosed fee.

Following such an impressive spell in Verona, he was purchased by Serie A side U.S. Città di Palermo together with teammate Mattia Cassani. Half of the Munari's registration rights was valued €1 million while full "card" of Cassani was valued €2.5 million. However, Munari never managed to break into the first team at the Sicilian club and did not play at all during the first half of the 2006–07 Serie A season, being subsequently loaned out to Serie B side Lecce in January 2007. In June 2007 Palermo acquired another half of Munari for €800,000. However, in July 2007, Lecce acquired 50% of the player's rights from Palermo for €1 million; Munari then remained at Lecce for four more seasons, making a total of 143 appearances for the club, scoring 16 goals and becoming one of the first team mainstays.

=== From Fiorentina to Sampdoria ===
In June 2011, Munari's co-ownership was ultimately solved in favour of Palermo for €391,000, and the player returned to Palermo, but was immediately clarified he was not in the rosanero first team plans after he was not called up to join the Sicilians' pre-season training camp. On 21 July 2011, he moved permanently to Fiorentina for €800,000, signing a three-year contract for the Tuscans. On 31 January 2012, the final day of 2011–12 winter transfer window, he moved to Serie B side Sampdoria.

==== Loan to Watford ====
On 4 August 2014, Munari joined English Championship side Watford on a season-long loan deal from Parma. He scored his first goal for Watford against Rotherham United on 19 August 2014 in a 2–0 away win for the Hornets.

=== Cagliari ===
After his loan at Watford expired, and after leaving Parma, Munari penned a one-year deal with Cagliari on 29 July 2015. His contract was extended in summer 2016.

=== Return to Parma ===
In January 2017, Munari was re-signed by Parma in a 2 1/2-year contract. On 14 November 2019, he announced his retirement from playing and that he joined the club's scouting department.

==== Loan to Verona ====
On 31 January 2019, Munari joined Verona on loan until 30 June 2019.
