= Marco Marchionni =

Italian footballer (born 1980)

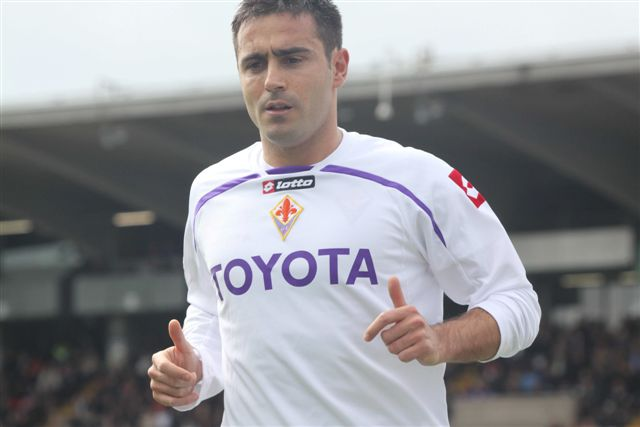
- Marchionni playing for Fiorentina

Personal information
- Date of birth: 22 July 1980 (age 46)
- Place of birth: Monterotondo, Italy
- Height: 1.73 m (5 ft 8 in)
- Position: Winger

Senior career*
Years	Team	Apps	(Gls)
1997–1998	Monterotondo	29	(4)
1998–2001	Empoli	55	(7)
2001–2006	Parma	112	(13)
2003	→ Piacenza (loan)	16	(1)
2006–2009	Juventus	63	(3)
2009–2012	Fiorentina	60	(7)
2012–2014	Parma	61	(2)
2014–2015	Sampdoria	1	(0)
2015–2017	Latina	6	(0)
2017–2018	Carrarese	6	(0)
Total		409	(37)

International career
2000–2002	Italy U21	18	(2)
2003–2009	Italy	6	(0)

Managerial career
- 2018–2020: Carrarese (Assistant coach)
- 2020–2021: Foggia
- 2021–2022: Novara
- 2023: Novara
- 2023–2024: Potenza
- 2024–2026: Ravenna
- * Club domestic league appearances and goals

Marco Marchionni (Italian pronunciation: [ˈmarko marˈkjɔnni]; born 22 July 1980) is an Italian professional football coach and former Italian professional footballer who played as a midfielder.

A versatile player, he was capable of playing in several midfield positions, and has been deployed as a right winger, as an attacking midfielder, and even as a central midfielder in his later career. A right-footed player, his main attributes are his pace, technique, and dribbling skills, as well as his crossing and playmaking ability, which make him an effective assist provider.

== Club career ==
=== Early career ===
Marchionni began his professional career with Empoli F.C. in 1998, from CND team Monterotondo; he won the Torneo di Viareggio in 2000 with the youth side. He spent three seasons at the club only to leave the team for Parma in 2001, where he won the 2001–02 Coppa Italia, though he only played in the first leg of the final. He played little during his first two years at Parma, and was loaned to Italian club Piacenza for the second half of the 2002–03 season, to get more playing time, experience, and increase his skills. His performances were convincing enough that he was recalled to Parma and included in the first team for the 2003–04 season.

In 2003–04, under Cesare Prandelli, who was renowned for his affinity for young players, Marchionni blossomed under his guidance. That season Marchionni became a revelation in the league and made his career breakthrough, with 35 games played and six goals scored in Serie A and UEFA Cup. His performances earned him his first call-up with the Italian senior side.

The following season was also positive, with 32 games and six goals scored. The 2005–06 season was by far Marchionni's best with Parma: he gave great contributions to the team's gameplay, including many assists and many instances of "playmaking." He finished the season with 31 appearances and four goals, helping Parma avoid relegation. His talent and relatively young age attracted the keen eyes of the Juventus scouts, and the team did not delay signing him from Parma. Marchionni joined his new team on a free transfer in June 2006.

=== Juventus ===
In 2006–07, Marchionni agreed to play with Juventus in Serie B, and under manager Didier Deschamps, he immediately helped his team to win the title, and gain Serie A promotion that season; his performances enabled him to be recalled to the national side.

During the 2007–08 season, his second with Juventus, which saw Juventus compete in Serie A once again, Marchionni suffered an injury-filled season, keeping him off the pitch for most of the season. He only managed to start one game but played a total of eleven league matches, scoring one goal.

During the pre-season to the 2008–09 Serie A campaign, Marchionni was in excellent form playing in all the friendly tournaments and matches. He stated that he hoped to continue his form and remain injury free for the season's Champions League, Serie A, and Coppa Italia with Juventus.

In the 2008–09 Serie A campaign, he was quickly introduced into the Juventus squad as the club's first-choice winger Mauro Camoranesi was ruled out to injury problems. He handled this brilliantly with a handful of great performances, including the match against A.S. Roma, where he scored a goal.

=== Fiorentina ===
On 6 July 2009, ACF Fiorentina agreed with Juventus to buy Marchionni, subject to personal terms.

On 15 July 2009, Marchionni signed a contract with ACF Fiorentina after having spent three years with Juventus, making a total of 78 appearances and seven goals in all competitions. He was part of a 'swap plus cash' deal that saw midfielder Felipe Melo go the other way to Turin. Marchionni joined Cesare Prandelli, his former coach at Parma, and former Parma teammates Sébastien Frey, Marco Donadel, Alberto Gilardino and Adrian Mutu for the 2009–10 season. He scored his first goal for the Viola against Genoa in a 2–1 defeat on 28 October 2009, repeating this step the following week with a brace against Catania in a 3–1 win and another goal in the next UEFA Champions League encounter against Debreceni.

=== Parma ===
On 14 September 2012, Marchionni rejoined Parma on a free transfer after being released by Fiorentina earlier in the summer.

=== Sampdoria ===
On 27 August 2014, Marchionni joined U.C. Sampdoria, while Andrea Costa moved in the opposite direction.

=== Latina ===
On 31 August 2015, Sampdoria sold Marchionni to U.S. Latina Calcio for free, as part of the deal that Antonio Di Nardo moved to Sampdoria for €1 million, net of VAT.

== International career ==
Marchionni was a member of the Italy U21 team between 2000 and 2002 and made 18 appearances for the side in total, scoring two goals. He was called up for the 2002 UEFA European Under-21 Football Championship under Claudio Gentile, forming the Italian midfield with Matteo Brighi, Andrea Pirlo and Manuele Blasi, as they reached the semi-finals.

Marchionni made his senior debut for the national team on 12 November 2003, under Giovanni Trapattoni, in a 3–1 friendly defeat to Poland in Warsaw. In the 2006 FIFA World Cup he was one of the four backup players for the 23-men main squad to step in for any possible injuries. However, he did not take part in the final tournament under Marcello Lippi, and thus never received a winners medal.

Despite playing in Serie B with Juventus during the 2006–07 season, he received another call up to Italy national team in September 2006, where he won his third cap under Roberto Donadoni in a 1–1 home draw against Lithuania in a UEFA Euro 2008 qualifying match on 2 September. On 30 August 2009, he was called up again by Lippi after a three-year absence from the Italy national side, taking part in Italy's 2–0 away win against Georgia on 5 September, in a 2010 FIFA World Cup qualifying match. In total, he obtained six caps for Italy between 2003 and 2009.

== Coaching career ==
After retiring as a player, Marchionni agreed to stay at Carrarese, becoming the assistant to head coach Silvio Baldini. In October 2020 he became the head coach of Foggia.

On 11 September 2021, he was hired by Novara in Serie D. On his first season in charge, he won the Group A title, thus immediately leading Novara back to Serie C.

After working with Novara during the pre-season, on 18 August 2022, Marchionni parted ways with the club. On 16 January 2023, he was re-hired as Novara manager. After guiding them to a mid-table finish, Novara announced on 14 June 2023 to have parted ways with Marchionni once again.

On 28 December 2023, Marchionni was unveiled as the new head coach of Serie C club Potenza. He was dismissed on 13 April 2024, together with sporting director Fortunato Varrà, and replaced by Pietro De Giorgio.

On 25 October 2024, he moved down a division to accept the head coaching job at Serie D club Ravenna.

== Career statistics ==
National team	Club	Season	Apps	Goals
Italy	Parma	2003–04	2	0
Italy	Juventus	2006–07	1	0
Italy	Fiorentina	2009–10	3	0
Total			6	0

== Honours ==
=== Player ===
Parma

- Coppa Italia: 2001–02

Juventus

- Serie B: 2006–07

=== Manager ===
Novara

- Serie D: 2021–22 (Group A)
