= Felipe (footballer, born July 1984) =

Brazilian footballer

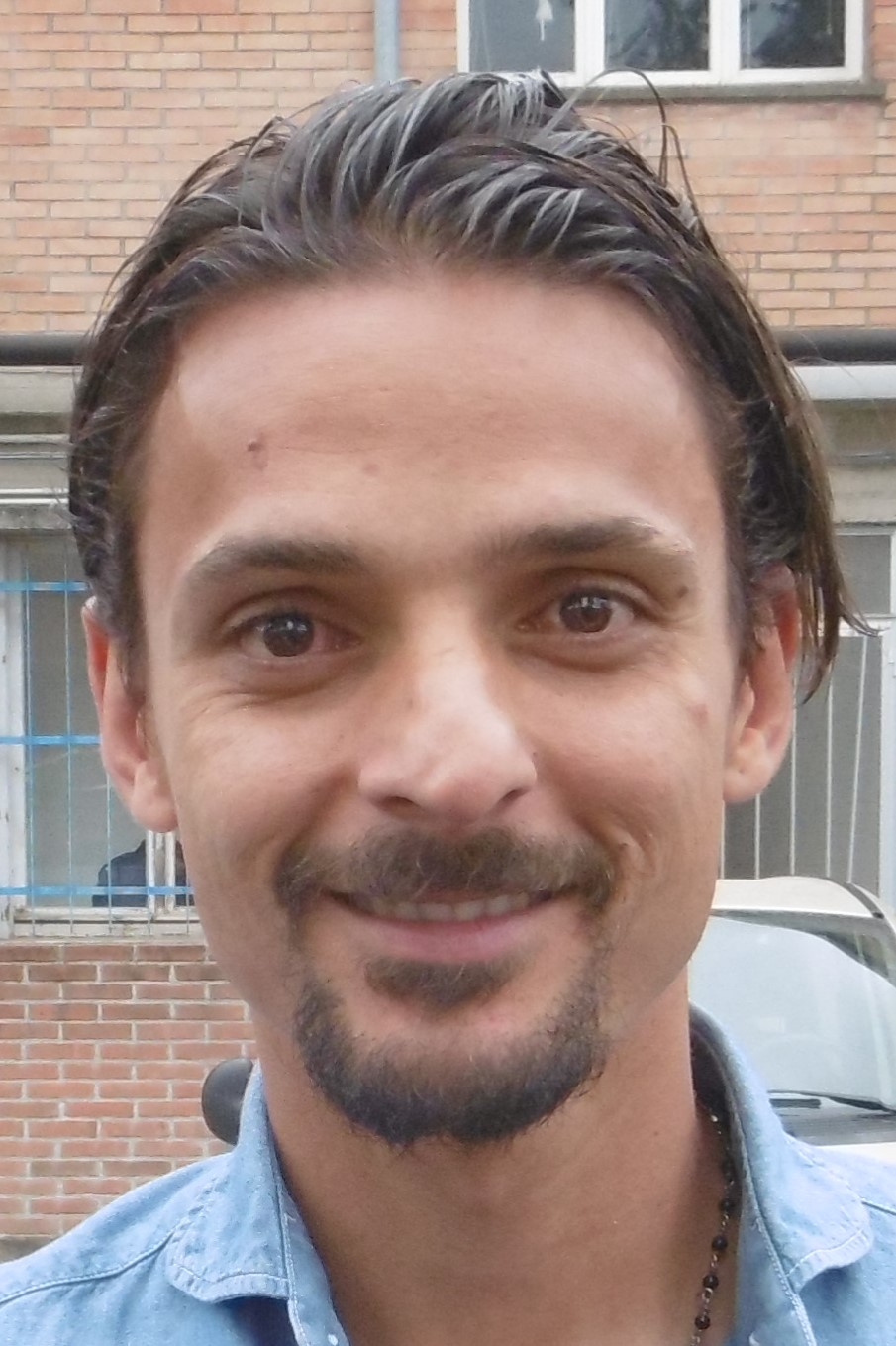
- Felipe

Personal information
- Full name: Felipe Dias da Silva dal Belo
- Date of birth: 31 July 1984 (age 42)
- Place of birth: Guaratinguetá, Brazil
- Height: 1.88 m (6 ft 2 in)
- Position: Centre back

Youth career
- 1999–2002: Udinese

Senior career*
Years	Team	Apps	(Gls)
2002–2010	Udinese	139	(5)
2010	→ Fiorentina (loan)	18	(0)
2010–2013	Fiorentina	8	(0)
2011	→ Cesena (loan)	7	(0)
2012–2013	→ Siena (loan)	34	(0)
2013–2015	Parma	33	(1)
2015	Internazionale	4	(0)
2015–2017	Udinese	54	(2)
2017–2020	SPAL	75	(4)
- * Club domestic league appearances and goals

Felipe Dias da Silva dal Belo, commonly known as Felipe (born 31 July 1984), is a Brazilian former professional footballer who played as a defender. He has spent most of his professional career in Serie A.

== Club career ==
=== Udinese ===
Felipe began his career with Udinese Calcio, where he made his first team debut in April 2003. He has proven himself as a reliable central defender in Serie A, especially in the 2005–06 season for the club in the UEFA Champions League.

Felipe signed a new four-year contract with Udinese in March 2008 which would see him stay until 2012. He also signed an improved contract in November 2005.

In the 2006–07 season, Felipe missed the rest of the season after he was injured in January. He returned to the team in September 2007 and became one of the key players who helped Udinese qualify for the 2008–09 UEFA Cup. But another injury in March 2008 meant he would miss the rest of the season and he returned in November 2008. He played 6 matches in 2008–09 UEFA Cup, which he missed the front part of the tournament.

In the 2009–10 season, Felipe was not a regular; the coach preferred Andrea Coda and Cristian Zapata (who changed his role from fullback) as the central defensive pair. He only played 3 league matches.

=== Fiorentina ===
A week before the opening of the transfer window, Felipe was allowed to train with ACF Fiorentina and have medical and aptitudinal tests to finalize a possible transfer on 28 December 2009.

On 2 January 2010, Felipe completed the transfer, signed a loan contract with option to purchase. The loan fee was €3 million. He made his debut for the Viola in a 5–1 away win to Siena. In June 2010 la Viola excised the rights to sign him for €6 million. After a disappointing performance, he was loaned out to Cesena on 31 January 2011. On 21 August 2012, he was signed by Siena.

=== Internazionale ===
After being released from Parma, Felipe joined Internazionale on 26 February 2015, on a six-month deal, he will wear shirt no 26.

=== Return to Udinese ===
On 30 August 2015, he returned to Udinese, signing a two-year contract with an option for a third year. In 4 October, he made his debut on a draw against Genoa.

=== SPAL ===
On 3 July 2017, he moved to SPAL and signed a three-year contract.

=== Semi-professional league ===
On 20 February 2021, after spending one year being a free agent, he was signed by ASD Manzanese, a club playing in Serie D. 13 July 2022, Felipe signed for another club that used to play in Serie D, signed for Torviscosa.

== Career statistics ==
As of match played 2 August 2020

Appearances and goals by club, season and competition
Club	Season	League			National Cup		Continental		Other		Total	
Club	Season	Division	Apps	Goals	Apps	Goals	Apps	Goals	Apps	Goals	Apps	Goals
Udinese	2002–03	Serie A	4	0	0	0	—		—		4	0
Udinese	2003–04	Serie A	16	0	3	0	—		—		19	0
Udinese	2004–05	Serie A	31	0	4	1	—		—		35	1
Udinese	2005–06	Serie A	35	3	5	0	10	1	—		50	4
Udinese	2006–07	Serie A	12	1	3	0	—		—		15	1
Udinese	2007–08	Serie A	22	1	3	1	—		—		25	2
Udinese	2008–09	Serie A	16	2	2	0	6	0	—		24	2
Udinese	2009–10	Serie A	3	0	0	0	—		—		3	0
Fiorentina (loan)	2009–10	Serie A	18	0	1	0	2	0	—		21	0
Fiorentina	2010–11	Serie A	5	0	1	0	—		—		6	0
Cesena (loan)	2010–11	Serie A	7	0	0	0	—		—		7	0
Fiorentina	2011–12	Serie A	3	0	0	0	—		—		3	0
Fiorentina	Total		26	0	2	0	2	0	0	0	30	0
Siena	2012–13	Serie A	34	0	1	0	—		—		35	0
Parma	2013–14	Serie A	22	0	3	0	—		—		25	0
Parma	2014–15	Serie A	11	1	1	0	—		—		12	1
Parma	Total		33	1	4	0	0	0	0	0	37	1
Inter	2014–15	Serie A	4	0	0	0	—		—		4	0
Udinese	2015–16	Serie A	26	1	1	0	—		—		27	1
Udinese	2016–17	Serie A	32	1	1	0	—		—		33	1
Udinese	Total		197	9	22	2	16	1	0	0	235	12
SPAL	2017–18	Serie A	30	1	0	0	—		—		30	1
SPAL	2018–19	Serie A	30	3	1	0	—		—		31	3
SPAL	2019–20	Serie A	15	0	1	0	—		—		16	0
SPAL	Total		75	4	2	0	0	0	0	0	77	4
Career total			376	14	31	2	18	1	0	0	425	17
