= Jonathan Biabiany =

French footballer (born 1988)

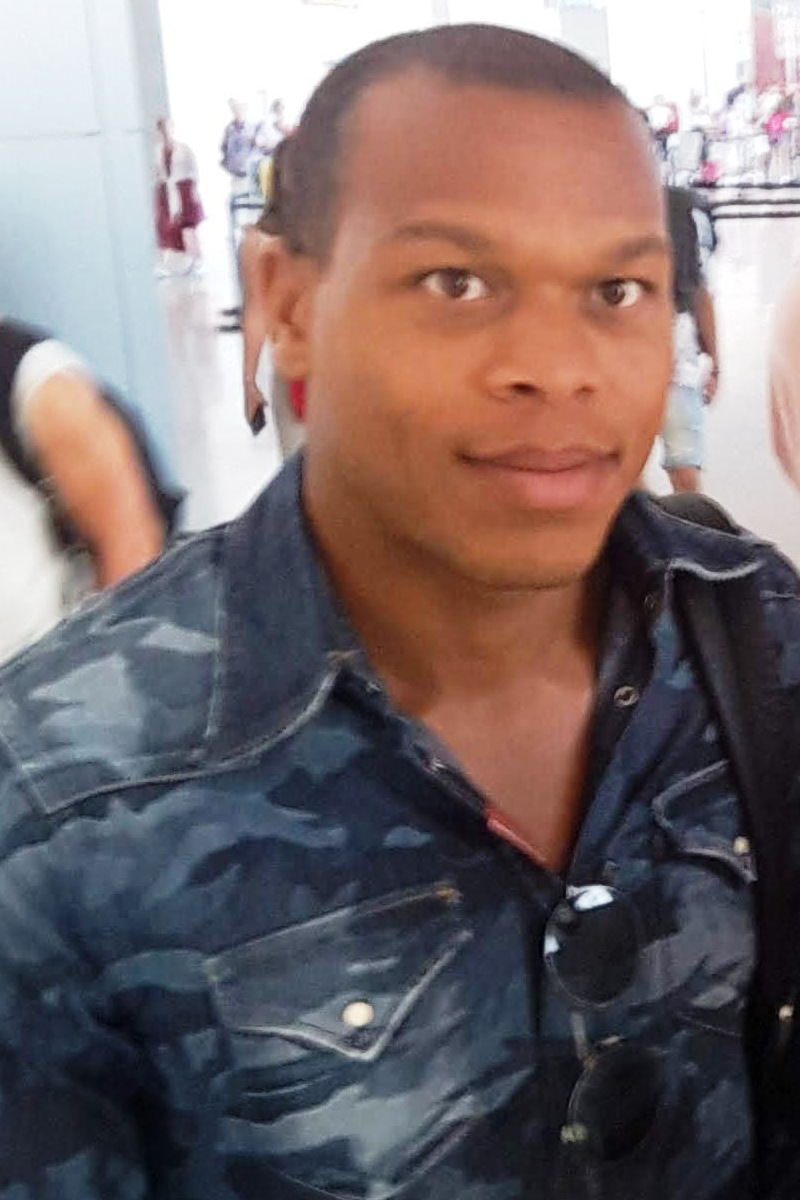
- Biabiany in 2018

Personal information
- Full name: Jonathan Ludovic Biabiany
- Date of birth: 28 April 1988 (age 38)
- Place of birth: Paris, France
- Height: 1.77 m (5 ft 10 in)
- Position: Winger

Youth career
- 2000–2004: Blanc Mesnil
- 2004–2007: Inter Milan

Senior career*
Years	Team	Apps	(Gls)
2007–2010	Inter Milan	0	(0)
2007–2008	→ Chievo Verona (loan)	0	(0)
2008–2009	→ Modena (loan)	55	(9)
2009–2010	→ Parma (loan)	13	(2)
2010	Parma	16	(4)
2010–2011	Inter Milan	14	(1)
2011	Sampdoria	16	(1)
2011–2015	Parma	108	(14)
2015–2018	Inter Milan	21	(1)
2017–2018	→ Sparta Prague (loan)	15	(0)
2018–2019	Parma	18	(0)
2019–2020	Trapani	12	(0)
2020–2024	San Fernando	122	(22)
2024–2026	Antequera	65	(8)

International career
2009–2010	France U21	6	(2)
- * Club domestic league appearances and goals as of 10 September 2026

Jonathan Ludovic Biabiany (born 28 April 1988) is a French professional footballer who plays as a winger. Between 2008 and 2014, he was regarded as the fastest footballer in the world.

== Early life ==
Biabiany, of Guadeloupean descent, began his career with a local club in Le Blanc-Mesnil (in the northeastern suburbs of Paris) and was signed by Italian club Inter Milan in July 2004, initially as Jonathan Begora.

== Club career ==
=== Inter Milan ===
Biabiany, along with Sebastián Ribas, made his senior debut for Inter against Empoli in the Coppa Italia in January 2007. It was his only appearance that season.

==== Chievo Verona (loan) ====
In August 2007, he was loaned to Chievo Verona, but failed to play a first-team game. Instead, he played with the club's youth team, and by January 2008, he had made the Chievo bench just two times, not being used on either occasion.

==== Modena (loan) ====
Biabiany was then loaned to Modena in January 2008, where his loan was extended to a further season in July 2008. He became an immediate starter at Modena and made 15 appearances in the second half of the 2007–08 season, scoring his first goal at a professional level against Ascoli in Round 41 of the Serie B. The next season, he had an explosion of form at Modena, managing eight goals and eight assists in 40 appearances.

=== Parma ===
In July 2009, Biabiany was loaned to Parma, who had recently been promoted back to Serie A. He featured in the first team for the first few league matches. After international duty for France's under-21 team, he did not play again for Parma due to minor injuries until late November. Notably, he scored both of Parma's goals in a 2–2 draw with Genoa in Round 15, his first two Serie A goals.

On 1 February 2010, Parma gained half the rights to Biabiany, as part of a deal that sent McDonald Mariga to Inter. Inter later revealed that Biabiany was valued €5 million at that time, thus it cost Parma €2.5 million for half of the rights. He ended the season with six goals and three assists in 30 appearances.

=== Return to Inter ===
In June 2010, Inter bought Biabiany and Mariga outright for €4.2 million each. The deal effectively made Inter pay €10.9 million in cash and the special loan of Biabiany to Parma for the signing of Mariga.

On 13 July 2010, Biabiany was presented to the media by Inter where he declared it was "a joy to be back home". He was also registered as one of the four club-trained players for 2010–11 UEFA Champions League.

On 18 December 2010, he scored his first goal for Inter, against TP Mazembe in the 2010 FIFA Club World Cup Final, following an assist by Dejan Stanković. He registered three assists in one game, when the nerazzurri beat his old side Parma 5–2 in Round 14.

=== Sampdoria ===
On 28 January 2011, it was confirmed that Biabiany would move to Sampdoria as part of the deal that took Giampaolo Pazzini to Inter for €19 million. Biabiany was valued at €7 million at that time, thus only €12 million cash was involved. Biabiany struggled in his time at Sampdoria as they were relegated, managing one goal and three assists in 16 appearances.

=== Return to Parma ===
On 24 June 2011, Biabiany was signed to Parma on a loan deal with an option to purchase him outright from Sampdoria, a year after his departure from the Emilian club. He went on to feature in every Parma league game that season and the summer of 2012 saw him move to Parma in a co-ownership deal for €2.5 million on a three-year contract.

On 2 February 2014, Biabiany extended his contract to 30 June 2018. On 20 June 2014, Parma acquired Biabiany outright for another €1 million.

After a strong 2013–14 season, Biabiany was set to move to Milan on the last day of the 2014 summer transfer window. After posing for a photo with the Milan scarf outside of the club headquarters, Biabiany failed his medical at what was set to become his new home with the Milan side's medical staff uncovering a heart problem the player had. After extensive testing, doctors indicated that the Frenchman had an irregular heartbeat and would miss the first half of the season in order to have his condition treated. Biabiany returned to training in February 2015. On 11 April 2015, Biabiany terminated his contract with Parma by mutual consent. Parma was declared bankrupt in mid-season.

=== Third spell with Inter ===
On 10 July 2015, Biabiany rejoined Inter as a free agent, signing a four-year contract. On 24 September 2015, Biabiany returned to action against Hellas Verona following one year on the sideline. He was substituted on for Geoffrey Kondogbia in the 17th minute of the second half.

Biabiany scored his first league goal for the club in a 4–0 win over Frosinone, a victory that pushed Inter two points clear at the top of the league table.

==== Sparta Prague (loan) ====
On 7 August 2017, Biabiany left for Sparta Prague on a temporary basis.

=== Second return to Parma ===
On 7 August 2018, Biabiany signed a one-year contract with Parma.

=== Trapani ===
On 8 November 2019, Biabiany signed a one-year contract with Serie B club Trapani.

=== San Fernando ===
On 13 August 2020 he joined third-tier Spanish club San Fernando.

== International career ==
Biabiany has represented France at under-21 level, making 4 competitive appearances in team's successful 2009 UEFA European Under-21 Championship qualifying campaign.

== Health problems ==
On 18 September 2014, it was announced that Biabiany had been diagnosed with cardiac dysrhythmia, and would be out of competitive action for an indefinite period. His irregular heartbeat had been discovered on 1 September during a medical exam with the staff of Milan, where his acquisition from Parma had already been announced. Following his medical exam, another statement was issued announcing that the transfer had been called off; the initial reason given was that Milan defender Cristian Zaccardo could not agree to terms for his return to Parma, and therefore the deal had collapsed. The announcement of Biabiany's condition by Parma CEO Pietro Leonardi seventeen days later revealed the true reason for the transfer's cancellation. Leonardi stated that Biabiany had undergone further testing upon his return to Parma, after which "It was felt that the best thing to do at this time would be to take a break from competitive activity for a limited period of time, during which the player will be monitored and subjected to further investigation to establish the eventual return to action".

== Career statistics ==
As of 11 June 2019

Appearances and goals by club, season and competition
Club	Season	League			National cup (Note: Includes Coppa Italia, Czech Cup)		Continental		Total	
Club	Season	Division	Apps	Goals	Apps	Goals	Apps	Goals	Apps	Goals
Inter Milan	2006–07	Serie A	0	0	1	0	0	0	1	0
ChievoVerona (loan)	2007–08	Serie B	0	0	0	0	—		0	0
Modena (loan)	2007–08	Serie B	15	1	—		—		15	1
Modena (loan)	2008–09	Serie B	38	8	2	0	—		40	8
Modena (loan)	Total		53	9	2	0	—		55	9
Parma (loan)	2009–10	Serie A	29	6	1	0	—		30	6
Inter Milan	2010–11	Serie A	14	0	1	0	6 (Note: Five appearances in UEFA Champions League, one appearance in FIFA Club World Cup)	1	21	1
Sampdoria	2010–11	Serie A	16	1	0	0	—		16	1
Parma	2011–12	Serie A	38	6	0	0	—		38	6
Parma	2012–13	Serie A	33	2	1	0	—		34	2
Parma	2013–14	Serie A	36	6	2	1	—		38	7
Parma	2014–15	Serie A	1	0	0	0	—		1	0
Parma	Total		108	14	3	1	—		111	15
Inter Milan	2015–16	Serie A	20	1	4	0	—		24	1
Inter Milan	2016–17	Serie A	1	0	0	0	3 (Note: Appearance(s) in UEFA Europa League)	0	4	0
Inter Milan	Total		21	1	4	0	3	0	28	1
Sparta Prague	2017–18	Czech First League	15	0	1	0	0	0	16	0
Parma	2018–19	Serie A	18	0	1	0	—		19	0
Career total			274	31	14	1	9	1	297	33

== Honours ==
Inter Milan

- Supercoppa Italiana: 2010
- FIFA Club World Cup: 2010
