= Mine Stars =

- Full name: Mine Stars
- Ground: Ghana
- League: Division One League Zone 2A

Mine Stars is a Ghanaian professional football team that plays in the 2A Zone of the Ghana Division One League. Zone 2A has seven competing teams from the part of the Ashanti Region, Western Region and the Central Region of Ghana.
