= Mattia Cassani =

Italian footballer

Personal information
- Date of birth: 26 August 1983 (age 43)
- Place of birth: Borgomanero, Italy
- Height: 1.85 m (6 ft 1 in)
- Position: Right back

Team information
- Current team: Bari
- Number: 15

Youth career
- Juventus

Senior career*
Years	Team	Apps	(Gls)
2002–2003	Juventus	0	(0)
2003	→ Sampdoria (loan)	2	(0)
2003–2006	Verona	118	(0)
2006–2011	Palermo	161	(2)
2011–2013	Fiorentina	34	(1)
2013	→ Genoa (loan)	5	(0)
2013–2015	Parma	52	(0)
2015–2016	Sampdoria	25	(0)
2016–2018	Bari	28	(0)
Total		425	(3)

International career^{‡}
2003	Italy U-20	6	(0)
2004	Italy U-21 Serie B	1	(0)
2009–2012	Italy	11	(0)
- * Club domestic league appearances and goals as of 17 October 2016 ‡ National team caps and goals as of 11 September 2012

Mattia Cassani (Italian pronunciation: [matˈtiːa kasˈsaːni]; born 26 August 1983) is an Italian former footballer who played as a defender.

== Club career ==
=== Juventus ===
Cassani started his career at Juventus during the 2002–03 Serie A season, and then left for Sampdoria on loan in January 2003.

=== Verona ===
In June 2003 Cassani left for Hellas Verona on loan with an option to buy him outright for €800,000, Cassani was awarded the number 83 shirt. The loan was extended for one more year in the same month. In June 2005, Verona bought him in a co-ownership deal for €400,000. With Juventus facing the 2006 Italian football scandal they terminated all co-ownership deals, either selling or buying back, Verona bought Cassani outright in June 2006 for an undisclosed fee, thought to be around €1.43 million.

=== Palermo ===
Cassani, who had made a name for himself as a versatile fullback, capable of playing on either flank, joined Palermo on 1 July 2006, for €2.5 million on a five-year contract along with teammate Gianni Munari (who joined the club in a co-ownership deal for €1 million on a four-year contract). That season, Palermo also sold Fabio Grosso.

On 6 April 2008, Cassani scored his first professional goal, a late 28-yard shot which gave Palermo a 3–2 home win against his former club Juventus, ending a string of four consecutive defeats.

In October 2008, his contract was renewed until 30 June 2013. Cassani extended his contract again during the 2010–11 season, until 30 June 2015. Cassani also served as team captain during the first period of the 2010–11 season due to the absence of both Fabrizio Miccoli and Fabio Liverani.

On 2 February 2011, Cassani made his 151st appearance with Palermo, thus becoming the most capped player in Serie A history for the rosanero.

=== Fiorentina ===
On 24 August 2011, Cassani moved to Fiorentina on loan, for €2 million, with an option to make the move permanent at the end of the season, for another €2.75 million. On 2 July 2012, he moved permanently to Fiorentina for the pre-agreed price on a three-year contract.

On 30 January 2013, he moved to Genoa in a temporary deal with the option to purchase, rejoining Rubén Olivera. In June 2013 Genoa did not excise their option to buy Cassani and sold Nenad Tomović to Fiorentina in a forced auction, as both clubs failed to form an agreement before the deadline. On 7 July 2013, Cassani and Olivera were included in La Viola's pre-season friendly. Both players were not in the starting line-up.

=== Parma ===
On 8 August 2013, Cassani was signed by Parma on a temporary deal with the option to buy. In July 2014 he was signed outright.

=== Return to Sampdoria ===
On 2 July 2015, Cassani joined Sampdoria on a free transfer, having been recently released by Parma.

== International career ==
Cassani was capped at U20 level, a development squad to fill the gap between the U19 team and the U21.

He also played for the U21 B team consisting of Serie B players, against Belgium U21 on 30 March 2004. On the same day Italy U21 team also scheduled a match against Portugal U21.

In May 2009, Cassani got his first senior national call-up to play for Italy against Northern Ireland, but did not make his debut on that occasion. After receiving his second call-up for Italy's friendlies against the Netherlands and Sweden in November later that year, he made his international debut on 18 November 2009, coming on as a substitute for Christian Maggio in a 1–0 friendly win against Sweden, earning praise for his performance.

Although he was initially named to Lippi's 30 and 28-men provisional 2010 FIFA World Cup squads, he was not included in the 23-men final squad for the tournament, as Italy suffered a first round elimination.

On 6 August 2010, he received his first call-up under the new Italy manager Cesare Prandelli for a friendly match against the Ivory Coast, making a substitute appearance in a 1–0 defeat, coming on for Marco Motta in the 70th minute of the match. Cassani was subsequently also called up for Italy's UEFA Euro 2012 qualifiers against Estonia and the Faroe Islands, making his first competitive appearance for Italy, and his first international appearance as a starter in a 2–1 away win over Estonia on 3 September 2010; in total he made 4 appearances in the European qualifiers.

== Style of play ==
A versatile right-footed full-back, although he is usually deployed on the right, Cassani is capable of playing along either flank, and is effective both offensively and defensively, due to his defensive skills, consistency and work-rate, as well as his crossing accuracy, technique, and ability to make attacking runs; he has also occasionally been deployed as a centre-back, due to his tenacity and physique.

== Career statistics ==
=== Club ===
As of 31 July 2013

Appearances and goals by club, season and competition
Club	Season	League			Cup		Continental		Total	
Club	Season	Division	Apps	Goals	Apps	Goals	Apps	Goals	Apps	Goals
Juventus	2002–03	Serie A	0	0	0	0	1	0	1	0
Sampdoria (loan)	2002–03	Serie B	2	0	0	0	0	0	2	0
Hellas Verona	2003–04	Serie B	37	0	1	0	0	0	38	0
Hellas Verona	2004–05	Serie B	40	0	3	0	0	0	43	0
Hellas Verona	2005–06	Serie B	41	0	2	0	0	0	43	0
Hellas Verona	Total		118	0	6	0	0	0	124	0
Palermo	2006–07	Serie A	30	0	2	0	5	0	37	0
Palermo	2007–08	Serie A	26	1	2	0	1	0	29	1
Palermo	2008–09	Serie A	36	1	0	0	0	0	36	1
Palermo	2009–10	Serie A	37	0	3	0	0	0	40	0
Palermo	2010–11	Serie A	32	0	5	0	7	0	44	0
Palermo	2011–12	Serie A	0	0	0	0	2	0	2	0
Palermo	Total		161	2	12	0	15	0	188	2
Fiorentina	2011–12	Serie A	26	1	1	0	0	0	27	1
Fiorentina	2012–13	Serie A	8	0	2	0	0	0	10	0
Fiorentina	Total		34	1	3	0	0	0	37	1
Genoa (loan)	2012–13	Serie A	5	0	0	0	–	–	5	0
Career total			320	3	21	0	16	0	357	3

=== International ===
Appearances and goals by national team and year
National team	Year	Apps	Goals
Italy	2009	1	0
Italy	2010	5	0
Italy	2011	4	0
Italy	2012	1	0
Total		11	0
