= 2005–06 SS Lazio season =

Lazio
2005–06 season
- Owner: Claudio Lotito
- Chairman: Claudio Lotito
- Manager: Delio Rossi
- Serie A: 6th (later reverted to 16th)
- Coppa Italia: Quarter-finals
- Intertoto Cup: Semi-finals
- Top goalscorer: League: Tommaso Rocchi (16); All: Tommaso Rocchi (17)
Home colours	Away colours	Third colours

The 2005–06 season was the 106th season in Società Sportiva Lazio's history and their 18th consecutive season in the top-flight of Italian football. Lazio finished Serie A in 6th place, but were later placed in 16th, just above the relegation zone due to involvement in the 2006 Italian football scandal.

== Squad ==
Note: Flags indicate national team as defined under FIFA eligibility rules; some limited exceptions apply. Players may hold more than one non-FIFA nationality.

No.	Pos.	Nation	Player
1	GK	ITA	Angelo Peruzzi
2	DF	ITA	Guglielmo Stendardo
4	MF	ITA	Fabio Firmani
5	DF	ITA	Felice Piccolo
6	MF	FRA	Ousmane Dabo
7	DF	ITA	Manuel Belleri
8	DF	ITA	Luciano Zauri
9	FW	ITA	Paolo Di Canio
10	MF	ITA	Massimo Bonanni
11	MF	ITA	Stefano Mauri
13	DF	ITA	Sebastiano Siviglia
14	DF	ITA	Lorenzo De Silvestri
16	DF	ITA	Andrea Giallombardo
17	FW	ALB	Igli Tare

No.	Pos.	Nation	Player
18	FW	ITA	Tommaso Rocchi
19	FW	MKD	Goran Pandev
20	MF	ITA	Fabio Liverani
21	FW	ITA	Simone Inzaghi
22	DF	ITA	Massimo Oddo
24	GK	SLO	Samir Handanovič
25	DF	BRA	Cribari
26	MF	BEL	Gaby Mudingayi
31	MF	DEN	Christian Keller
32	GK	ITA	Marco Ballotta
68	MF	CIV	Christian Manfredini
85	MF	SUI	Valon Behrami
86	MF	BRA	Guilherme Siqueira

=== Transfers ===
In
Pos.	Name	from	Type
GK	Marco Ballotta	Treviso FBC 1993	
DF	Manuel Belleri	Udinese Calcio	
DF	Emílson Sánchez Cribari	Udinese Calcio	loan
DF	Andrea Giallombardo	AS Livorno	loan
DF	Cristiano Gimelli	AS Casale Calcio	loan ended
DF	Felice Piccolo	Juventus FC	loan
DF	Sebastiano Siviglia	Parma FC	
DF	Guglielmo Stendardo	AC Perugia Calcio	
MF	Valon Behrami	Genoa CFC	
MF	Fabio Firmani	Calcio Catania	
MF	Christian Keller	Torino FC	
MF	Miguel Mea Vitali	Sora Calcio	loan ended
MF	Gaby Mudingayi	Torino FC	
MF	Braian Robert	US Catanzaro 1929	loan ended
FW	Simone Inzaghi	UC Sampdoria	loan ended
FW	Goran Pandev	Internazionale	
FW	Igli Tare	Bologna FC 1909	

Out
Pos.	Name	To	Type
GK	Fabrizio Casazza	AC Pavia	
DF	Fernando Couto	Parma FC	
DF	Cristiano Gimelli	US Viterbese 1908	loan
DF	Matías Lequi	Celta Vigo	loan
DF	Óscar López	FC Barcelona	loan ended
DF	Paolo Negro	AC Siena	
DF	Simone Sannibale	Salernitana Calcio	loan
DF	Anthony Šerić	Hellas Verona FC	loan ended
DF	Leonardo Talamonti	Rosario Central	loan ended
MF	Dino Baggio	US Triestina	
MF	Emiliano Corsi	Giulianova Calcio	
MF	Alessio Ferrazza	Hellas Verona FC	
MF	Antonio Filippini	US Città di Palermo	loan ended
MF	Emanuele Filippini	US Città di Palermo	loan ended
MF	Giuliano Giannichedda	Juventus FC	
MF	Esteban González	Gimnasia La Plata	loan ended
MF	Miguel Mea Vitali	Levadiakos	
MF	Fabrizio Melara	Salernitana Calcio	loan
MF	Braian Robert	La Plata FC	
MF	Simone Rughetti	SS Tivoli Calcio	
FW	Fabio Bazzani	UC Sampdoria	loan ended
FW	Claudio de Sousa	Torino FC	
FW	Roberto Delgado	SPAL	loan
FW	Claudio López	Club América	
FW	Roberto Muzzi	Torino FC	

==== Winter ====
In
Pos.	Name	from	Type
GK	Samir Handanovič	Treviso FBC 1993	loan
DF	Guilherme Siqueira	Internazionale	loan
MF	Valon Behrami	Genoa CFC	
MF	Massimo Bonanni	US Città di Palermo	loan
MF	Stefano Mauri	Udinese Calcio	loan
MF	Fabrizio Melara	Salernitana Calcio	loan ended
FW	Roberto Delgado	SPAL	loan ended

Out
Pos.	Name	To	Type
GK	Matteo Sereni	Treviso FBC 1993	loan
DF	Marco Angeletti	US Sambenedettese	
MF	Roberto Baronio	Udinese Calcio	loan
MF	César	Internazionale	
MF	Andrea Ciani	Genoa CFC	
MF	Fabrizio Melara	US Sambenedettese	
FW	Roberto Delgado	Potenza Calcio	
FW	Simone Perugini	US Sambenedettese	

== Competitions ==
=== Serie A ===
==== League table ====
Pos	Team	Pld	W	D	L	GF	GA	GD	Pts	Qualification or relegation
14	Cagliari	38	8	15	15	42	55	−13	39	
15	Siena	38	9	12	17	42	60	−18	39	
16	Lazio (Note: Milan, Fiorentina and Lazio were docked 30 points, all for involvement in the Calciopoli.)	38	16	14	8	57	47	+10	32	
17	Messina (Note: Messina were reprieved from relegation following Juventus's punishment.)	38	6	13	19	33	59	−26	31	
18	Lecce (R)	38	7	8	23	30	57	−27	29	Relegation to Serie B

Source: 2005–06 Serie A, Soccerway
Rules for classification: 1) points; 2) goal difference; 3) number of goals scored.
(R) Relegated

==== Results summary ====
Overall								Home						Away					
Pld	W	D	L	GF	GA	GD	Pts	W	D	L	GF	GA	GD	W	D	L	GF	GA	GD
38	16	14	8	57	47	+10	62	11	7	1	34	18	+16	5	7	7	23	29	−6

==== Results by round ====
Round	1	2	3	4	5	6	7	8	9	10	11	12	13	14	15	16	17	18	19	20	21	22	23	24	25	26	27	28	29	30	31	32	33	34	35	36	37	38
Ground	H	A	H	A	H	A	H	A	H	A	H	A	A	H	A	H	A	H	A	A	H	A	H	A	H	A	H	A	H	A	H	H	A	H	A	H	A	H
Result	W	D	W	L	W	L	W	D	D	L	D	L	W	W	L	D	D	W	D	D	D	W	D	L	D	W	L	D	W	L	W	D	W	W	D	W	W	W
Position	1	4	2	7	4	8	4	5	5	8	10	12	9	8	8	8	8	7	8	9	9	8	7	8	9	8	8	8	7	8	6	7	6	6	6	6	6	16

Updated to match(es) played on 14 May 2006. Source: Competitive matches
A = Away; H = Home; W = Win; D = Draw; L = Loss

==== Matches ====
28 August 2005 1	Lazio	1–0	Messina	Rome
15:00 CEST (UTC+02:00)	Pandev 21'			Stadium: Stadio Olimpico; Attendance: 23,004; Referee: Paolo Dondarini

11 September 2005 2	Cagliari	1–1	Lazio	Cagliari
20:30 CEST (UTC+02:00)	Suazo 1'		Siviglia 13'	Stadium: Stadio Sant'Elia; Attendance: 10,000; Referee: Paolo Bertini

18 September 2005 3	Lazio	3–1	Treviso	Rome
15:00 CEST (UTC+02:00)	Rocchi 20'; Pandev 26'; Oddo 87' (pen.)		Pinga 44'	Stadium: Stadio Olimpico; Attendance: 22,378; Referee: Paolo Mazzoleni

21 September 2005 4	Milan	2–0	Lazio	Milan
20:30 CEST (UTC+02:00)	Shevchenko 12'; Kaká 14'			Stadium: San Siro; Attendance: 57,778; Referee: Paolo Dondarini

25 September 2005 5	Lazio	4–2	Palermo	Rome
15:00 CEST (UTC+02:00)	Rocchi 58', 86'; Pandev 60'; Manfredini 85'		Caracciolo 36'; M. González 49'	Stadium: Stadio Olimpico; Attendance: 25,000; Referee: Massimiliano Saccani

1 October 2005 6	Udinese	3–0	Lazio	Udine
20:30 CEST (UTC+02:00)	Iaquinta 51' (pen.); Di Natale 79'; Candela 90'			Stadium: Stadio Friuli; Attendance: 15,000; Referee: Roberto Rosetti

16 October 2005 7	Lazio	1–0	Fiorentina	Rome
15:00 CEST (UTC+02:00)	Zauri 82'			Stadium: Stadio Olimpico; Attendance: 27,502; Referee: Nicola Rizzoli

23 October 2005 8	Roma	1–1	Lazio	Rome
20:30 CEST (UTC+02:00)	Totti 40'		Rocchi 57'	Stadium: Stadio Olimpico; Attendance: 61,030; Referee: Gianluca Paparesta

26 October 2005 9	Lazio	2–2	Chievo	Rome
20:30 CEST (UTC+02:00)	Rocchi 32'; Oddo 90+1' (pen.)		D'Anna 48'; Pellissier 66'	Stadium: Stadio Olimpico; Attendance: 20,000; Referee: Nicola Ayroldi

30 October 2005 10	Reggina	1–0	Lazio	Reggio Calabria
15:00 CET (UTC+01:00)	Zauri 76' (o.g.)			Stadium: Stadio Oreste Granillo; Attendance: 9,352; Referee: Gianluca Rocchi

5 November 2005 11	Lazio	0–0	Internazionale	Rome
20:30 CET (UTC+01:00)				Stadium: Stadio Olimpico; Attendance: 33,367; Referee: Domenico Messina

20 November 2005 12	Sampdoria	2–0	Lazio	Genoa
15:00 CET (UTC+01:00)	Diana 71'; Flachi 73'			Stadium: Stadio Luigi Ferraris; Attendance: 22,575; Referee: Salvatore Racalbuto

27 November 2005 13	Empoli	2–3	Lazio	Empoli
15:00 CET (UTC+01:00)	Bonetto 55'; Tavano 58' (pen.)		Dabo 28'; Tare 77'; Liverani 80'	Stadium: Stadio Carlo Castellani; Attendance: 6,290; Referee: Paolo Tagliavento

4 December 2005 14	Lazio	3–2	Siena	Rome
15:00 CET (UTC+01:00)	Di Canio 42'; César 61'; Tare 80'		Bogdani 53'; Peruzzi 90+1' (o.g.)	Stadium: Stadio Olimpico; Attendance: 20,000; Referee: Luca Marelli

11 December 2005 15	Livorno	2–1	Lazio	Livorno
15:00 CET (UTC+01:00)	De Ascentis 58'; Peruzzi 79' (o.g.)		Pandev 66'	Stadium: Stadio Armando Picchi; Attendance: 13,000; Referee: Daniele Tombolini

17 December 2005 16	Lazio	1–1	Juventus	Rome
20:30 CET (UTC+01:00)	Rocchi 16'		Trezeguet 26'	Stadium: Stadio Olimpico; Attendance: 28,000; Referee: Tiziano Pieri

21 December 2005 17	Lecce	0–0	Lazio	Lecce
20:30 CET (UTC+01:00)				Stadium: Stadio Via del Mare; Attendance: 12,082; Referee: Giorgio Lops

8 January 2006 18	Lazio	4–1	Ascoli	Rome
15:00 CET (UTC+01:00)	Di Canio 29'; Mudingayi 34'; Pandev 73'; Tare 80'		Guana 14'	Stadium: Stadio Olimpico; Attendance: 30,000; Referee: Nicola Stefanini

15 January 2006 19	Parma	1–1	Lazio	Parma
15:00 CET (UTC+01:00)	Corradi 39'		Di Canio 6'	Stadium: Stadio Ennio Tardini; Attendance: 20,000; Referee: Paolo Dondarini

18 January 2006 20	Messina	1–1	Lazio	Messina
20:30 CET (UTC+01:00)	Rafael 22'		Manfredini 78'	Stadium: Stadio San Filippo; Attendance: 8,000; Referee: Tiziano Pieri

21 January 2006 21	Lazio	1–1	Cagliari	Rome
20:30 CET (UTC+01:00)	Di Canio 36'		Gobbi 69'	Stadium: Stadio Olimpico; Attendance: 21,972; Referee: Mario Mazzoleni

29 January 2006 22	Treviso	0–1	Lazio	Treviso
15:00 CET (UTC+01:00)			Rocchi 87'	Stadium: Stadio Omobono Tenni; Attendance: 5,071; Referee: Paolo Tagliavento

5 February 2006 23	Lazio	0–0	Milan	Rome
20:30 CET (UTC+01:00)				Stadium: Stadio Olimpico; Attendance: 29,956; Referee: Massimiliano Saccani

8 February 2006 24	Palermo	3–1	Lazio	Palermo
20:30 CET (UTC+01:00)	M. González 12'; Tedesco 56'; Caracciolo 65'		Belleri 84'	Stadium: Stadio Renzo Barbera; Attendance: 27,000; Referee: Gianluca Rocchi

11 February 2006 25	Lazio	1–1	Udinese	Rome
20:30 CET (UTC+01:00)	Rocchi 20'		Iaquinta 26' (pen.)	Stadium: Stadio Olimpico; Attendance: 21,503; Referee: Andrea De Marco

19 February 2006 26	Fiorentina	1–2	Lazio	Florence
15:00 CET (UTC+01:00)	Bojinov 61'		Behrami 33'; Rocchi 50'	Stadium: Stadio Artemio Franchi; Attendance: 30,196; Referee: Paolo Tagliavento

26 February 2006 27	Lazio	0–2	Roma	Rome
20:30 CET (UTC+01:00)			Taddei 31'; Aquilani 63'	Stadium: Stadio Olimpico; Attendance: 60,040; Referee: Matteo Trefoloni

5 March 2006 28	Chievo	2–2	Lazio	Verona
15:00 CET (UTC+01:00)	Tiribocchi 42', 45'		Mauri 32'; Oddo 67' (pen.)	Stadium: Stadio Marcantonio Bentegodi; Attendance: 5,461; Referee: Paolo Mazzoleni

12 March 2006 29	Lazio	3–1	Reggina	Rome
15:00 CET (UTC+01:00)	Di Canio 25'; Rocchi 36'; Pandev 68'		Amoruso 69'	Stadium: Stadio Olimpico; Attendance: 20,000; Referee: Nicola Stefanini

19 March 2006 30	Internazionale	3–1	Lazio	Milan
15:00 CET (UTC+01:00)	Figo 37'; Recoba 46', 72'		Pandev 54'	Stadium: San Siro; Attendance: 48,818; Referee: Tiziano Pieri

26 March 2006 31	Lazio	2–0	Sampdoria	Rome
15:00 CEST (UTC+02:00)	Oddo 70', 90' (pen.)			Stadium: Stadio Olimpico; Attendance: 24,000; Referee: Roberto Rosetti

2 April 2006 32	Lazio	3–3	Empoli	Rome
15:00 CEST (UTC+02:00)	Pandev 7'; Behrami 8'; Di Canio 80'		Tosto 25'; Tavano 64'; Oddo 90+3' (o.g.)	Stadium: Stadio Olimpico; Attendance: 24,061; Referee: Nicola Ayroldi

9 April 2006 33	Siena	2–3	Lazio	Siena
15:00 CEST (UTC+02:00)	Vergassola 24'; Chiesa 40' (pen.)		Mauri 14'; Rocchi 22'; Dabo 50'	Stadium: Stadio Artemio Franchi; Attendance: 9,525; Referee: Nicola Rizzoli

15 April 2006 34	Lazio	3–1	Livorno	Rome
15:00 CEST (UTC+02:00)	Oddo 20' (pen.); Pandev 56', 71'		Colucci 52'	Stadium: Stadio Olimpico; Attendance: 25,662; Referee: Matteo Trefoloni

22 April 2006 35	Juventus	1–1	Lazio	Turin
15:00 CEST (UTC+02:00)	Trezeguet 87'		Rocchi 29'	Stadium: Stadio delle Alpi; Attendance: 33,898; Referee: Gianluca Paparesta

30 April 2006 36	Lazio	1–0	Lecce	Rome
15:00 CEST (UTC+02:00)	Rocchi 57'			Stadium: Stadio Olimpico; Attendance: 26,833; Referee: Gabriele Gava

7 May 2006 37	Ascoli	1–4	Lazio	Ascoli Piceno
15:00 CEST (UTC+02:00)	Ferrante 30'		Stendardo 7'; Oddo 11' (pen.); Pandev 20'; Rocchi 57'	Stadium: Stadio Cino e Lillo Del Duca; Attendance: 13,116; Referee: Luca Marelli

14 May 2006 38	Lazio	1–0	Parma	Rome
15:00 CEST (UTC+02:00)	Rocchi 61'			Stadium: Stadio Olimpico; Attendance: 32,000; Referee: Antonio Giannoccaro

==== Topscorers ====
- (Italy) Tommaso Rocchi 16
- (North Macedonia) Goran Pandev 12
- (Italy) Massimo Oddo 6 (6)
- (Italy) Paolo Di Canio 5

=== Coppa Italia ===
==== Round of 16 ====
8 December 2005 First leg	Lazio	2–0	Cittadella	Rome
20:30 CET	S. Inzaghi 39' (pen.); Pandev 84'			Stadium: Stadio Olimpico; Attendance: 5,000; Referee: Oberdan Pantana

12 January 2006 Second leg	Cittadella	0–0 (0–2 agg.)	Lazio	Padova
20:30 CET				Stadium: Stadio Euganeo; Attendance: 690; Referee: Oscar Girardi

==== Quarter-finals ====
24 January 2006 First leg	Lazio	1–1	Internazionale	Rome
21:00 CET	Manfredini 27'		Stanković 26'	Stadium: Stadio Olimpico; Attendance: 10,027; Referee: Nicola Rizzoli

2 February 2006 Second leg	Internazionale	1–0 (2–1 agg.)	Lazio	Milan
21:00 CET	Stanković 37'			Stadium: San Siro; Attendance: 25,000; Referee: Emidio Morganti

=== UEFA Intertoto Cup ===
==== Third round ====
17 July 2005 First leg	Lazio (Italy)	3–0	(Finland) Tampere United	Rome, Italy
17:00	Belleri 28'; Rocchi 29'; Di Canio 48'			Stadium: Stadio Olimpico; Attendance: 3,150; Referee: Hervé Piccirillo (France)

23 July 2005 Second leg	Tampere United (Finland)	1–1 (1–4 agg.)	(Italy) Lazio	Tampere, Finland
17:00	Wiss 88'		Muzzi 90'	Stadium: Ratina Stadion; Attendance: 3,151; Referee: Rob Styles (England)

==== Semi-finals ====
27 July 2005 First leg	Lazio (Italy)	1–1	(France) Marseille	Rome, Italy
21:00	Di Canio 42'		Méïté 70'	Stadium: Stadio Olimpico; Attendance: 19,698; Referee: Carlos Megía Dávila (Spain)

3 August 2005 Second leg	Marseille (France)	3–0 (4–1 agg.)	(Italy) Lazio	Marseille, France
21:00	Niang 60'; Mendoza 61'; Ribéry 65'			Stadium: Stade Vélodrome; Attendance: 40,987; Referee: António Costa (Portugal)
