= 2008–09 SS Lazio season =

Lazio
2008–09 season
- Owner: Claudio Lotito
- Chairman: Claudio Lotito
- Manager: Delio Rossi
- Serie A: 10th
- Coppa Italia: Winners
- Top goalscorer: League: Mauro Zárate (13); All: Mauro Zárate (16)
- Highest home attendance: 55,490 v Roma (11 April 2009)
- Lowest home attendance: 25,500 v Napoli (26 October 2008)
- Average home league attendance: 34,626
Home colours	Away colours	Third colours

The 2008–09 season was the 109th season in Società Sportiva Lazio's history and their 21st consecutive season in the top-flight of Italian football. Lazio finished in 10th place in Serie A, however, won the Coppa Italia this season.

== Club ==
=== Management ===
Position	Staff
Head coach	(Italy) Delio Rossi
Assistant coach	(Italy) Fedele Limone
Goalkeeping coach	(Italy) Adalberto Grigioni
Fitness coaches	(Italy) Valter Vio (Italy) Adriano Bianchini
Club doctors	(Italy) Roberto Bianchini (Italy) Stefano Salvatori

Last updated: October 14, 2008
Source: S.S Lazio Staff

=== Other information ===
President	(Italy) Claudio Lotito
Ground (capacity and dimensions)	Stadio Olimpico (72, 698 / 105m x 68m)

Source: SSLazio.it

== Squad ==
=== First team ===
As of September 20, 2008 Note: Flags indicate national team as defined under FIFA eligibility rules; some limited exceptions apply. Players may hold more than one non-FIFA nationality.

No.	Pos.	Nation	Player
1	GK	ARG	Juan Pablo Carrizo
2	DF	SUI	Stephan Lichtsteiner
3	DF	SRB	Aleksandar Kolarov
4	MF	ITA	Fabio Firmani
5	MF	ITA	Cristian Brocchi
6	MF	FRA	Ousmane Dabo
7	DF	ITA	Manuel Belleri
8	MF	BRA	Matuzalém (on loan from Real Zaragoza)
10	FW	ARG	Mauro Zárate (on loan from Al-Sadd)
11	MF	ITA	Stefano Mauri
13	DF	ITA	Sebastiano Siviglia
14	GK	ITA	Tommaso Berni
16	DF	ITA	Alessandro Tuia
17	MF	ITA	Pasquale Foggia
18	FW	ITA	Tommaso Rocchi (captain)
19	FW	MKD	Goran Pandev
20	FW	CZE	Libor Kozák

No.	Pos.	Nation	Player
21	FW	ITA	Simone Inzaghi
22	DF	CZE	David Rozehnal
23	MF	ALG	Mourad Meghni
24	MF	ARG	Cristian Ledesma (vice-captain)
25	DF	BRA	Emílson Sánchez Cribari
26	FW	NGA	Stephen Ayodele Makinwa
29	DF	ITA	Lorenzo De Silvestri
32	DF	ROU	Ştefan Radu
49	MF	ITA	Antonio Cinelli
68	MF	CIV	Christian Manfredini
80	MF	ITA	Massimo Mutarelli
81	FW	ITA	Simone Del Nero
86	GK	URU	Fernando Muslera
87	DF	FRA	Modibo Diakité
89	GK	FRA	Vincent Degré
90	FW	ITA	Ettore Mendicino
91	DF	ITA	Marco Davide Faraoni

For all transfers and loans pertaining to Lazio for the current season, please see; summer 2008 transfers.

=== Double passports ===
- (Italy) Juan Pablo Carrizo
- (Italy) Mauro Zárate
- (France) Mourad Meghni
- (Italy) Cristian Ledesma
- (Italy) Cribari
- (Italy) Christian Manfredini
- (Italy) Fernando Muslera

=== Non-EU players ===
- (Serbia) Aleksandar Kolarov
- (Brazil) Matuzalém
- (Nigeria) Stephen Makinwa
- (North Macedonia) Goran Pandev

== Competitions ==
=== Serie A ===
==== League table ====
Pos	Team	Pld	W	D	L	GF	GA	GD	Pts	Qualification or relegation
8	Palermo	38	17	6	15	57	50	+7	57	
9	Cagliari	38	15	8	15	49	50	−1	53	
10	Lazio	38	15	5	18	46	55	−9	50	Qualification to Europa League play-off round (Note: Lazio qualified for the play-off round of the 2009–10 UEFA Europa League by winning the 2008–09 Coppa Italia.)
11	Atalanta	38	13	8	17	45	48	−3	47	
12	Napoli	38	12	10	16	43	45	−2	46 (Note: Napoli finished ahead of Sampdoria on head-to-head points: Napoli 2–0 Sampdoria, Sampdoria 2–2 Napoli.)	

Source: lega-calcio.it (in Italian)
Rules for classification: 1) points; 2) head-to-head points; 3) head-to-head goal difference; 4) head-to-head goals scored; 5) goal difference; 6) number of goals scored.

==== Results summary ====
Overall								Home						Away					
Pld	W	D	L	GF	GA	GD	Pts	W	D	L	GF	GA	GD	W	D	L	GF	GA	GD
38	15	5	18	46	55	−9	50	8	4	7	23	24	−1	7	1	11	23	31	−8

==== Results by round ====
Round	1	2	3	4	5	6	7	8	9	10	11	12	13	14	15	16	17	18	19	20	21	22	23	24	25	26	27	28	29	30	31	32	33	34	35	36	37	38
Ground	A	H	A	H	A	H	A	H	A	H	H	A	H	A	H	A	H	A	H	H	A	H	A	H	A	H	A	H	A	A	H	A	H	A	H	A	H	A
Result	W	W	L	W	W	D	L	L	W	W	W	L	D	L	L	D	W	W	D	L	L	L	L	D	W	W	W	L	L	L	W	W	L	L	L	L	W	L
Position	1	1	3	2	1	1	5	7	6	5	4	5	5	5	7	8	7	7	7	9	9	10	11	11	10	7	7	8	9	9	9	9	9	10	10	10	10	10

Updated to match(es) played on 31 May 2009. Source: Competitive matches
A = Away; H = Home; W = Win; D = Draw; L = Loss

==== Matches ====
31 August 2008 1	Cagliari	1–4	Lazio	Cagliari
15:00 CEST (UTC+02:00)	Larrivey 31'		Zárate 62' (pen.), 71'; Foggia 75'; Pandev 84'	Stadium: Stadio Sant'Elia; Attendance: 12,000; Referee: Mauro Bergonzi

14 September 2008 2	Lazio	2–0	Sampdoria	Rome
15:00 CEST (UTC+02:00)	Zárate 7'; Pandev 72'			Stadium: Stadio Olimpico; Attendance: 35,000; Referee: Christian Brighi

21 September 2008 3	Milan	4–1	Lazio	Milan
20:30 CEST (UTC+02:00)	Seedorf 7'; Zambrotta 34'; Pato 48'; Kaká 59'		Zárate 25'	Stadium: San Siro; Attendance: 57,362; Referee: Nicola Rizzoli

24 September 2008 4	Lazio	3–0	Fiorentina	Rome
20:30 CEST (UTC+02:00)	Mauri 51'; Pandev 55'; Siviglia 59'			Stadium: Stadio Olimpico; Attendance: 32,000; Referee: Andrea De Marco

28 September 2008 5	Torino	1–3	Lazio	Turin
15:00 CEST (UTC+02:00)	Amoruso 90+2' (pen.)		Pandev 30'; Zárate 63', 83' (pen.)	Stadium: Stadio Olimpico di Torino; Attendance: 15,264; Referee: Gabriele Gava

4 October 2008 6	Lazio	1–1	Lecce	Rome
18:00 CEST (UTC+02:00)	S. Inzaghi 38'		Tiribocchi 26'	Stadium: Stadio Olimpico; Attendance: 38,237; Referee: Nicola Pierpaoli

19 October 2008 7	Bologna	3–1	Lazio	Bologna
15:00 CEST (UTC+02:00)	Volpi 5'; Di Vaio 12', 26'		Rocchi 51'	Stadium: Stadio Renato Dall'Ara; Attendance: 20,145; Referee: Paolo Tagliavento

26 October 2008 8	Lazio	0–1	Napoli	Rome
15:00 CET (UTC+01:00)			Siviglia 61' (o.g.)	Stadium: Stadio Olimpico; Attendance: 30,000; Referee: Luca Banti

29 October 2008 9	Chievo	1–2	Lazio	Verona
20:30 CET (UTC+01:00)	Pellissier 11'		Pandev 15'; Mantovani 82' (o.g.)	Stadium: Stadio Marc'Antonio Bentegodi; Attendance: 9,282; Referee: Mauro Bergonzi

2 November 2008 10	Lazio	1–0	Catania	Rome
15:00 CET (UTC+01:00)	Foggia 85'			Stadium: Stadio Olimpico; Attendance: 30,000; Referee: Gabriele Gava

9 November 2008 11	Lazio	3–0	Siena	Rome
15:00 CET (UTC+01:00)	Zárate 58'; Rocchi 86', 90+3'			Stadium: Stadio Olimpico; Attendance: 30,799; Referee: Christian Brighi

16 November 2008 12	Roma	1–0	Lazio	Rome
20:30 CET (UTC+01:00)	J. Baptista 50'			Stadium: Stadio Olimpico; Attendance: 61,998; Referee: Gianluca Rocchi

23 November 2008 13	Lazio	1–1	Genoa	Rome
15:00 CET (UTC+01:00)	Dabo 80'		Milito 69'	Stadium: Stadio Olimpico; Attendance: 31,110; Referee: Paolo Mazzoleni

30 November 2008 14	Atalanta	2–0	Lazio	Bergamo
15:00 CET (UTC+01:00)	Valdés 54'; Floccari 68'			Stadium: Stadio Atleti Azzurri d'Italia; Attendance: 10,449; Referee: Mauro Bergonzi

6 December 2008 15	Lazio	0–3	Internazionale	Rome
20:30 CET (UTC+01:00)			Samuel 2'; Diakité 45+4' (o.g.); Ibrahimović 55'	Stadium: Stadio Olimpico; Attendance: 50,000; Referee: Daniele Orsato

14 December 2008 16	Udinese	3–3	Lazio	Udine
15:00 CET (UTC+01:00)	Di Natale 9', 55'; Quagliarella 15'		Zárate 60'; Diakité 72'; Ledesma 85'	Stadium: Stadio Friuli; Attendance: 14,000; Referee: Roberto Rosetti

20 December 2008 17	Lazio	1–0	Palermo	Rome
18:00 CET (UTC+01:00)	Rocchi 66'			Stadium: Stadio Olimpico; Attendance: 35,000; Referee: Gabriele Gava

11 January 2009 18	Reggina	2–3	Lazio	Reggio Calabria
15:00 CET (UTC+01:00)	Corradi 4'; Cozza 63'		Pandev 14', 21', 76'	Stadium: Stadio Oreste Granillo; Attendance: 10,000; Referee: Mauro Bergonzi

18 January 2009 19	Lazio	1–1	Juventus	Rome
20:30 CET (UTC+01:00)	Ledesma 25'		Mellberg 30'	Stadium: Stadio Olimpico; Attendance: 60,000; Referee: Emidio Morganti

25 January 2009 20	Lazio	1–4	Cagliari	Rome
15:00 CET (UTC+01:00)	Rocchi 3'		Jeda 5', 9'; Acquafresca 21' (pen.); Matri 41'	Stadium: Stadio Olimpico; Attendance: 35,000; Referee: Andrea Romeo

28 January 2009 21	Sampdoria	3–1	Lazio	Genoa
20:30 CET (UTC+01:00)	Delvecchio 13'; Cassano 55'; Stankevičius 55'		Rocchi 30'	Stadium: Stadio Luigi Ferraris; Attendance: 25,000; Referee: Nicola Ayroldi

1 February 2009 22	Lazio	0–3	Milan	Rome
20:45 CET (UTC+01:00)			Pato 42'; Ambrosini 47'; Kaká 83'	Stadium: Stadio Olimpico; Attendance: 45,000; Referee: Nicola Rizzoli

8 February 2009 23	Fiorentina	1–0	Lazio	Florence
15:00 CET (UTC+01:00)	Gilardino 90'			Stadium: Stadio Artemio Franchi; Attendance: 35,000; Referee: Andrea De Marco

14 February 2009 24	Lazio	1–1	Torino	Rome
18:00 CET (UTC+01:00)	Siviglia 75'		Abate 36'	Stadium: Stadio Olimpico; Attendance: 20,000; Referee: Massimiliano Saccani

22 February 2009 25	Lecce	0–2	Lazio	Lecce
15:00 CET (UTC+01:00)			Foggia 10'; Kolarov 50'	Stadium: Stadio Via del Mare; Attendance: 7,118; Referee: Andrea Gervasoni

28 February 2009 26	Lazio	2–0	Bologna	Rome
18:00 CET (UTC+01:00)	Zárate 36', 81'			Stadium: Stadio Olimpico; Attendance: 30,000; Referee: Carmine Russo

8 March 2009 27	Napoli	0–2	Lazio	Naples
15:00 CET (UTC+01:00)			Rocchi 57', 65'	Stadium: Stadio San Paolo; Attendance: 35,000; Referee: Massimiliano Saccani

15 March 2009 28	Lazio	0–3	Chievo	Rome
15:00 CET (UTC+01:00)			Bogdani 27'; Pellissier 28', 84'	Stadium: Stadio Olimpico; Attendance: 30,000; Referee: Oscar Girardi

21 March 2009 29	Catania	1–0	Lazio	Catania
18:00 CET (UTC+01:00)	Paolucci 24'			Stadium: Stadio Angelo Massimino; Attendance: 15,000; Referee: Christian Brighi

5 April 2009 30	Siena	2–0	Lazio	Siena
15:00 CEST (UTC+02:00)	Calaiò 25'; Maccarone 85'			Stadium: Stadio Artemio Franchi; Attendance: 13,000; Referee: Domenico Celi

11 April 2009 31	Lazio	4–2	Roma	Rome
15:00 CEST (UTC+02:00)	Pandev 2'; Zárate 4'; Lichtsteiner 58'; Kolarov 85'		Mexès 10'; De Rossi 80'	Stadium: Stadio Olimpico; Attendance: 60,000; Referee: Emidio Morganti

18 April 2009 32	Genoa	0–1	Lazio	Genoa
18:00 CEST (UTC+02:00)			Zárate 65'	Stadium: Stadio Luigi Ferraris; Attendance: 26,000; Referee: Massimiliano Saccani

26 April 2009 33	Lazio	0–1	Atalanta	Rome
15:00 CEST (UTC+02:00)			Talamonti 24'	Stadium: Stadio Olimpico; Attendance: 40,000; Referee: Andrea Romeo

2 May 2009 34	Internazionale	2–0	Lazio	Milan
20:30 CEST (UTC+02:00)	Ibrahimović 58'; Muntari 70'			Stadium: San Siro; Attendance: 58,576; Referee: Paolo Tagliavento

10 May 2009 35	Lazio	1–3	Udinese	Rome
15:00 CEST (UTC+02:00)	Rocchi 56'		Floro Flores 60'; D'Agostino 69'; Quagliarella 86' (pen.)	Stadium: Stadio Olimpico; Attendance: 20,000; Referee: Nicola Stefanini

17 May 2009 36	Palermo	2–0	Lazio	Palermo
15:00 CEST (UTC+02:00)	Miccoli 6' (pen.); Migliaccio 87'			Stadium: Stadio Renzo Barbera; Attendance: 29,480; Referee: Carmine Russo

20 May 2009 37	Lazio	1–0	Reggina	Rome
19:30 CEST (UTC+02:00)	Zárate 26'			Stadium: Stadio Olimpico; Attendance: 15,000; Referee: Andrea Gervasoni

31 May 2009 38	Juventus	2–0	Lazio	Turin
15:00 CEST (UTC+02:00)	Iaquinta 3', 59'			Stadium: Stadio Olimpico di Torino; Attendance: 21,000; Referee: Sebastiano Peruzzo

=== Coppa Italia ===
23 August 2008 Third round	Lazio	5–1	Benevento	Rome
20:45 CEST	Cattaneo 9' (o.g.); Meghni 23'; Manfredini 55'; Pandev 58', 90'		Bueno 49'	Stadium: Stadio Olimpico; Attendance: 9,000; Referee: Matteo Trefoloni

1 October 2008 Fourth round	Lazio	2–0	Atalanta	Rome
20:30 CEST	Ledesma 17'; Pandev 84'			Stadium: Stadio Olimpico; Attendance: 6,000; Referee: Matteo Trefoloni

3 December 2008 Round of 16	Milan	1–2 (a.e.t.)	Lazio	Milan
20:45 CET	Shevchenko 77'		Zárate 79' (pen.); Pandev 93'	Stadium: San Siro; Attendance: 3,905; Referee: Nicola Ayroldi

22 January 2009 Quarter-finals	Lazio	3–1	Torino	Rome
21:00 CET	Pandev 49'; Mauri 55'; Rocchi 90+1'		Natali 29'	Stadium: Stadio Olimpico; Attendance: 10,000; Referee: Andrea Gervasoni

3 March 2009 Semi-finals; First leg	Lazio	2–1	Juventus	Rome
20:45 CET	Pandev 65'; Rocchi 78'		Marchionni 34'	Stadium: Stadio Olimpico; Attendance: 50,000; Referee: Paolo Tagliavento

22 April 2009 Semi-finals; Second leg	Juventus	1–2 (2–4 agg.)	Lazio	Turin
20:45 CEST	Del Piero 64'		Zárate 38'; Kolarov 52'	Stadium: Stadio Olimpico; Attendance: 20,00; Referee: Nicola Rizzoli

13 May 2009 Final	Lazio	1–1 (a.e.t.) (6–5 p)	Sampdoria	Rome
20:45 CEST	Zárate 4'	Report	Pazzini 31'	Stadium: Stadio Olimpico; Attendance: 68,000; Referee: Roberto Rosetti
	Penalties
	Ledesma (penalty scored); Rocchi (penalty missed); Rozehnal (penalty scored); Kolarov (penalty scored); Zárate (penalty scored); Lichtsteiner (penalty scored); Dabo (penalty scored)		(penalty missed) Cassano; (penalty scored) Palombo; (penalty scored) Pazzini; (penalty scored) Gastaldello; (penalty scored) Accardi; (penalty scored) Delvecchio; (penalty missed) Campagnaro

== Top scorers ==
- (Argentina) Mauro Zárate 13 (2)
- (North Macedonia) Goran Pandev 9
- (Italy) Tommaso Rocchi 9
- (Italy) Pasquale Foggia 2
- (Argentina) Cristian Ledesma 2
- (Italy) Stefano Mauri 2

== Transfers ==
=== In ===
Date	Pos.	Name	From	Fee
9 June 2008	DF	(Czech Republic) David Rozehnal	(England) Newcastle United	Undisclosed
24 June 2008	DF	(Romania) Ştefan Radu	(Romania) Dinamo București	€4.2m
5 July 2008	FW	(Czech Republic) Libor Kozák	(Czech Republic) Opava	€1.2m
16 July 2008	DF	(Switzerland) Stephan Lichtsteiner	(France) Lille	€1.8m
28 August 2008	MF	(Italy) Cristian Brocchi	(Italy) Milan	Undisclosed

=== Out ===
Date	Pos.	Name	To	Fee
30 June 2008	GK	(Italy) Marco Ballotta	Unattached	Retired
30 June 2008	MF	(Italy) Fabio Vignaroli	Unattached	End of contract
9 July 2008	FW	(Albania) Igli Tare	Unattached	Retired
17 July 2008	MF	(Belgium) Gaby Mudingayi	(Italy) Bologna	€6m
23 July 2008	MF	(Switzerland) Valon Behrami	(England) West Ham United	€6.5m
25 October 2008	MF	(Italy) Massimo Mutarelli	Unattached	Breach of contract

=== Loaned in ===
Date From	Date To	Pos.	Name	From	Fee
5 July 2008	End of the season	FW	(Argentina) Mauro Zárate	(Qatar) Al-Sadd	€3m
18 July 2008	End of the season	MF	(Brazil) Matuzalém	(Spain) Real Zaragoza	Free

=== Loaned out ===
Date From	Date To	Pos.	Name	Moving To	Fee
19 July 2008	End of the season	DF	(Italy) Ivan Artipoli	(Italy) Modena	Free
18 July 2008	End of the season	DF	(Italy) Luciano Zauri	(Italy) Fiorentina	Free
31 August 2008	End of the season	MF	(Italy) Roberto Baronio	(Italy) Brescia	Free
31 August 2008	End of the season	DF	(Italy) Guglielmo Stendardo	(Italy) Lecce	Free
22 January 2009	End of the season	FW	(Nigeria) Stephen Makinwa	(Italy) Chievo	Free
25 January 2009	End of the season	DF	(Italy) Manuel Belleri	(Italy) Bologna	Free
31 January 2009	End of the season	GK	(Italy) Tommaso Berni	(Italy) Salernitana	Free

=== Estimated transfer totals ===
Does not take into account undisclosed fees.

Expenditure

Summer: ▼€10.2 million

Winter: ▼€0

Total: ▼€10.2 million

Income

Summer: ▲€12.5 million

Winter: ▲€0

Total: ▲€12.5 million

Overall

Summer: ▲€2.3 million

Winter: ▲€0

Total: ▲€2.3 million
