= 2006–07 SS Lazio season =

Lazio
2006–07 season
- Owner: Claudio Lotito
- Chairman: Claudio Lotito
- Manager: Delio Rossi
- Serie A: 3rd
- Coppa Italia: Third round
- Top goalscorer: League: Tommaso Rocchi (16); All: Tommaso Rocchi (19)
Home colours	Away colours	Third colours

The 2006–07 season was the 107th season in Società Sportiva Lazio's history and their 19th consecutive season in the top-flight of Italian football.

== Squad ==
Note: Flags indicate national team as defined under FIFA eligibility rules; some limited exceptions apply. Players may hold more than one non-FIFA nationality.

No.	Pos.	Nation	Player
1	GK	ITA	Angelo Peruzzi
2	DF	ITA	Guglielmo Stendardo
3	DF	ITA	Riccardo Bonetto
4	MF	ITA	Fabio Firmani
5	MF	ITA	Massimo Mutarelli
7	DF	ITA	Manuel Belleri
8	DF	ITA	Luciano Zauri
10	MF	ITA	Roberto Baronio
11	MF	ITA	Stefano Mauri
13	DF	ITA	Sebastiano Siviglia
14	GK	ITA	Tommaso Berni
15	DF	FRA	Modibo Diakité
17	FW	ALB	Igli Tare

No.	Pos.	Nation	Player
18	FW	ITA	Tommaso Rocchi
19	FW	MKD	Goran Pandev
20	FW	NGA	Stephen Makinwa
21	FW	ITA	Simone Inzaghi
24	MF	ARG	Cristian Ledesma
25	DF	BRA	Cribari
26	MF	BEL	Gaby Mudingayi
29	DF	ITA	Lorenzo De Silvestri
32	GK	ITA	Marco Ballotta
68	MF	CIV	Christian Manfredini
77	MF	CHI	Luis Jiménez
85	MF	SUI	Valon Behrami

=== Left club during season ===
Note: Flags indicate national team as defined under FIFA eligibility rules; some limited exceptions apply. Players may hold more than one non-FIFA nationality.

No.	Pos.	Nation	Player
22	DF	ITA	Massimo Oddo (to AC Milan)
—	MF	ITA	Pasquale Foggia (on loan to Reggina)
—	MF	ITA	Alberto Quadri (on loan to Spezia)

=== Formation ===
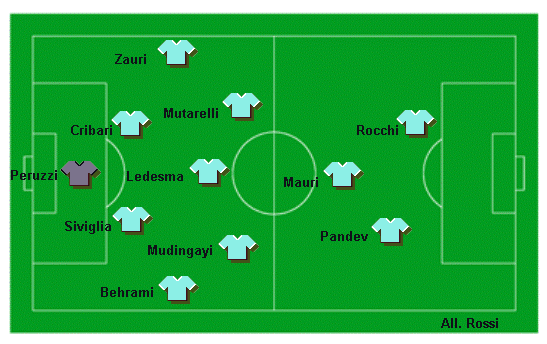

== Competitions ==
=== Serie A ===
==== League table ====
Pos	Team	Pld	W	D	L	GF	GA	GD	Pts	Qualification or relegation
1	Internazionale (C)	38	30	7	1	80	34	+46	97	Qualification to Champions League group stage (Note: Milan qualified for 2007–08 UEFA Champions League group stage instead of third qualifying round as the title holders.)
2	Roma	38	22	9	7	74	34	+40	75	Qualification to Champions League group stage
3	Lazio (Note: Fiorentina were docked 15 points, Reggina 11 points, Milan 8 points and Lazio 3 points, all for involvement in the 2006 Italian football scandal.)	38	18	11	9	59	33	+26	62	Qualification to Champions League third qualifying round
4	Milan	38	19	12	7	57	36	+21	61	Qualification to Champions League group stage
5	Palermo	38	16	10	12	58	51	+7	58	Qualification to UEFA Cup first round

Source: "Serie A 2006/2007 - 38. Round". worldfootball.net. 21 July 2025.
Rules for classification: 1) points; 2) goal difference; 3) number of goals scored.
(C) Champions

==== Results summary ====
Overall								Home						Away					
Pld	W	D	L	GF	GA	GD	Pts	W	D	L	GF	GA	GD	W	D	L	GF	GA	GD
38	18	11	9	69	33	+36	65	10	6	3	35	9	+26	8	5	6	34	24	+10

==== Results by round ====
Round	1	2	3	4	5	6	7	8	9	10	11	12	13	14	15	16	17	18	19	20	21	22	23	24	25	26	27	28	29	30	31	32	33	34	35	36	37	38
Ground	A	H	A	H	A	H	A	A	H	A	H	A	H	A	H	A	H	A	H	H	A	H	A	H	A	H	H	A	H	A	H	A	H	A	H	A	H	A
Result	L	L	W	W	W	D	L	L	D	D	W	W	W	L	W	D	L	W	D	D	W	D	D	W	W	W	W	W	W	W	W	D	L	D	W	L	D	L
Position	17	18	18	11	9	10	11	12	13	13	12	10	7	7	5	5	7	5	5	6	4	6	6	6	5	4	4	3	3	3	3	3	3	4	3	3	3	3

Updated to match(es) played on 27 May 2007. Source: Competitive matches
A = Away; H = Home; W = Win; D = Draw; L = Loss

==== Matches ====
10 September 2006 1	Milan	2–1	Lazio	Milan
15:00 CEST (UTC+02:00)	Inzaghi 27'; Oliveira 67'		Makinwa 73'	Stadium: San Siro; Attendance: 44,770; Referee: Paolo Bertini

17 September 2006 2	Lazio	1–2	Palermo	Rome
15:00 CEST (UTC+02:00)	Rocchi 73'		Di Michele 11', 38'	Stadium: Stadio Olimpico; Attendance: 20,395; Referee: Nicola Rizzoli

20 September 2006 3	Chievo	0–1	Lazio	Verona
20:30 CEST (UTC+02:00)			Oddo 63' (pen.)	Stadium: Stadio Marc'Antonio Bentegodi; Attendance: 5,232; Referee: Luca Banti

24 September 2006 4	Lazio	1–0	Atalanta	Rome
15:00 CEST (UTC+02:00)	Siviglia 69'			Stadium: Stadio Olimpico; Attendance: 19,339; Referee: Oscar Girardi

30 September 2006 5	Torino	0–4	Lazio	Turin
20:30 CEST (UTC+02:00)			Rocchi 48'; Oddo 55' (pen.), 77'; Mauri 81'	Stadium: Stadio Olimpico Grande Torino; Attendance: 14,000; Referee: Tiziano Pieri

15 October 2006 6	Lazio	0–0	Cagliari	Rome
20:30 CEST (UTC+02:00)				Stadium: Stadio Olimpico; Attendance: 19,402; Referee: Andrea De Marco

22 October 2006 7	Catania	3–1	Lazio	Lecce
15:00 CEST (UTC+02:00)	Colucci 36', 53'; Spinesi 45'		Rocchi 56'	Stadium: Stadio Via del Mare; Referee: Domenico Messina

25 October 2006 8	Sampdoria	2–0	Lazio	Genoa
20:30 CEST (UTC+02:00)	Quagliarella 52'; Volpi 74' (pen.)			Stadium: Stadio Luigi Ferraris; Attendance: 25,000; Referee: Matteo Trefoloni

29 October 2006 9	Lazio	0–0	Reggina	Rome
15:00 CET (UTC+01:00)				Stadium: Stadio Olimpico; Attendance: 18,315; Referee: Gabriele Gava

5 November 2006 10	Empoli	1–1	Lazio	Empoli
15:00 CET (UTC+01:00)	Vannucchi 87'		Rocchi 17'	Stadium: Stadio Carlo Castellani; Attendance: 4,679; Referee: Christian Brighi

12 November 2006 11	Lazio	5–0	Udinese	Rome
15:00 CET (UTC+01:00)	Rocchi 33', 81'; Mauri 41', 74'; Oddo 78'			Stadium: Stadio Olimpico; Attendance: 35,000; Referee: Mauro Bergonzi

19 November 2006 12	Messina	1–4	Lazio	Messina
15:00 CET (UTC+01:00)	Riganò 56' (pen.)		Mauri 11', 82'; Pandev 59'; Makinwa 84'	Stadium: Stadio San Filippo; Attendance: 7,000; Referee: Nicola Ayroldi

26 November 2006 13	Lazio	3–1	Ascoli	Rome
15:00 CET (UTC+01:00)	Belleri 8'; Pandev 25'; Foggia 85'		Mauri 16' (o.g.)	Stadium: Stadio Olimpico; Attendance: 23,868; Referee: Gianluca Paparesta

3 December 2006 14	Fiorentina	1–0	Lazio	Florence
15:00 CET (UTC+01:00)	Toni 15'			Stadium: Stadio Artemio Franchi; Attendance: 30,178; Referee: Nicola Rizzoli

10 December 2006 15	Lazio	3–0	Roma	Rome
20:30 CET (UTC+01:00)	Ledesma 44'; Oddo 52' (pen.); Mutarelli 73'			Stadium: Stadio Olimpico; Attendance: 60,815; Referee: Roberto Rosetti

17 December 2006 16	Livorno	1–1	Lazio	Livorno
15:00 CET (UTC+01:00)	Lucarelli 65'		Pandev 25'	Stadium: Stadio Armando Picchi; Attendance: 8,641; Referee: Oberdan Pantana

20 December 2006 17	Lazio	0–2	Internazionale	Rome
20:30 CET (UTC+01:00)			Cambiasso 40'; Materazzi 85'	Stadium: Stadio Olimpico; Attendance: 35,203; Referee: Gianluca Rocchi

23 December 2006 18	Parma	1–3	Lazio	Parma
18:00 CET (UTC+01:00)	Budan 20'		Stendardo 30'; Pandev 34'; Rocchi 45+1'	Stadium: Stadio Ennio Tardini; Attendance: 12,427; Referee: Massimiliano Saccani

14 January 2007 19	Lazio	1–1	Siena	Rome
20:30 CET (UTC+01:00)	Rocchi 61'		Cozza 87'	Stadium: Stadio Olimpico; Attendance: 16,925; Referee: Gabriele Gava

21 January 2007 20	Lazio	0–0	Milan	Rome
20:30 CET (UTC+01:00)				Stadium: Stadio Olimpico; Attendance: 28,948; Referee: Massimiliano Saccali

27 January 2007 21	Palermo	0–3	Lazio	Palermo
20:30 CET (UTC+01:00)			Rocchi 45', 80' (pen.); Siviglia 53'	Stadium: Stadio Renzo Barbera; Attendance: 22,453; Referee: Paolo Dondarini

11 February 2007 23	Atalanta	0–0	Lazio	Bergamo
15:00 CET (UTC+01:00)				Stadium: Stadio Atleti Azzurri d'Italia; Referee: Emidio Morganti

18 February 2007 24	Lazio	2–0	Torino	Rome
15:00 CET (UTC+01:00)	Pandev 11', 60'			Stadium: Stadio Olimpico; Attendance: 16,852; Referee: Nicola Rizzoli

25 February 2007 25	Cagliari	0–2	Lazio	Cagliari
15:00 CET (UTC+01:00)			Cribari 21'; Rocchi 34'	Stadium: Stadio Sant'Elia; Attendance: 8,000; Referee: Domenico Messina

28 February 2007 26	Lazio	3–1	Catania	Rome
15:00 CET (UTC+01:00)	Rocchi 45+5'; Pandev 60'; Siviglia 88'		Colucci 17'	Stadium: Stadio Olimpico; Attendance: 16,241; Referee: Gianluca Rocchi

4 March 2007 27	Lazio	1–0	Sampdoria	Rome
15:00 CET (UTC+01:00)	Rocchi 23'			Stadium: Stadio Olimpico; Attendance: 20,050; Referee: Oscar Girardi

11 March 2007 28	Reggina	2–3	Lazio	Reggio Calabria
15:00 CET (UTC+01:00)	Tedesco 26'; Foggia 65'		Manfredini 45'; Pandev 45+1'; Makinwa 79'	Stadium: Stadio Oreste Granillo; Attendance: 10,236; Referee: Massimiliano Saccani

18 March 2007 29	Lazio	3–1	Empoli	Rome
20:30 CET (UTC+01:00)	Pandev 8'; Rocchi 27'; Manfredini 74'		Almirón 90+4'	Stadium: Stadio Olimpico; Attendance: 25,527; Referee: Antonio Giannoccaro

1 April 2007 30	Udinese	2–4	Lazio	Udine
20:30 CEST (UTC+02:00)	Di Natale 58' (pen.); Iaquinta 90+2'		Stendardo 18'; Mauri 50'; Behrami 51'; Rocchi 60' (pen.)	Stadium: Stadio Friuli; Attendance: 13,652; Referee: Gianluca Paparesta

7 April 2007 31	Lazio	1–0	Messina	Rome
15:00 CEST (UTC+02:00)	Stendardo 45'			Stadium: Stadio Olimpico; Attendance: 24,106; Referee: Oscar Girardi

15 April 2007 32	Ascoli	2–2	Lazio	Ascoli Piceno
14:00 CEST (UTC+02:00)	Soncin 3'; Di Biagio 67' (pen.)		Rocchi 45+1'; Jiménez 74'	Stadium: Stadio Cino e Lillo Del Duca; Attendance: 9,600; Referee: Christian Brighi

18 April 2007 22	Lazio	0–0	Chievo	Rome
17:30 CEST (UTC+02:00)				Stadium: Stadio Olimpico; Attendance: 19,411; Referee: Mauro Bergonzi

22 April 2007 33	Lazio	0–1	Fiorentina	Rome
15:00 CEST (UTC+02:00)			Mutu 71'	Stadium: Stadio Olimpico; Attendance: 25,723; Referee: Massimiliano Saccani

29 April 2007 34	Roma	0–0	Lazio	Rome
15:00 CEST (UTC+02:00)				Stadium: Stadio Olimpico; Attendance: 61,292; Referee: Nicola Rizzoli

6 May 2007 35	Lazio	1–0	Livorno	Rome
15:00 CEST (UTC+02:00)	Jiménez 27'			Stadium: Stadio Olimpico; Attendance: 24,809; Referee: Paolo Dondarini

13 May 2007 36	Internazionale	4–3	Lazio	Milan
15:00 CEST (UTC+02:00)	Crespo 20', 35', 83'; Materazzi 86'		Pandev 3'; Mutarelli 5'; Ledesma 43'	Stadium: San Siro; Attendance: 45,429; Referee: Luca Banti

20 May 2007 37	Lazio	0–0	Parma	Rome
15:00 CEST (UTC+02:00)				Stadium: Stadio Olimpico; Attendance: 37,914; Referee: Andrea De Marco

27 May 2007 38	Siena	2–1	Lazio	Siena
15:00 CEST (UTC+02:00)	Maccarone 23' (pen.); Negro 85'		Rocchi 73' (pen.)	Stadium: Stadio Artemio Franchi; Attendance: 10,803; Referee: Domenico Messina

=== Coppa Italia ===
==== First round ====
20 August 2006	Lazio	4–0	Rende	Rome
20:30 CEST	Pandev 21'; Rocchi 34', 57'; De Silvestri 67'			Stadium: Stadio Flaminio; Attendance: 15.000; Referee: Stefano Ayroldi

==== Second round ====
23 August 2006	Monza	1–1 (a.e.t.) (2–3 p)	Lazio	Monza
20:30 CEST	Beretta 90+1'		Zauri 10'	Stadium: Stadio Brianteo; Attendance: 5,000; Referee: Paolo Tagliavento
	Penalties
	Campi (penalty scored); Coti (penalty scored); Tricarico (penalty missed); Santos (penalty missed); Beretta (penalty missed)		(penalty missed) Rocchi; (penalty scored) Tare; (penalty scored) Belleri; (penalty scored) Manfredini; (penalty missed) Ledesma

==== Third round ====
27 August 2006	Messina	4–3 (a.e.t.)	Lazio	Messina
20:30 CEST	Iliev 2'; Córdova 4'; Di Napoli 98', 102'		Pandev 6', 70'; Rocchi 113'	Stadium: Stadio San Filippo; Attendance: 10,000; Referee: Tiziano Pieri

== Goalscorers ==
=== Serie A ===
- (Italy) Tommaso Rocchi 16 (3)
- (North Macedonia) Goran Pandev 11
- (Italy) Stefano Mauri 6
- (Italy) Massimo Oddo 5 (3)
- (Nigeria) Stephen Ayodele Makinwa 3
- (Italy) Sebastiano Siviglia 3
- (Chile) Luis Jiménez 2
- (Argentina) Cristian Ledesma 2
- (Ivory Coast) Christian Manfredini 2
- (Italy) Massimo Mutarelli 2
- (Switzerland) Valon Behrami 1
- (Italy) Manuel Belleri 1
- (Brazil) Emílson Sánchez Cribari 1
- (Italy) Pasquale Foggia 1

=== Coppa Italia ===
- (North Macedonia) Goran Pandev 3
- (Italy) Tommaso Rocchi 3
- (Italy) Lorenzo De Silvestri 1
- (Italy) Luciano Zauri 1

== Sources ==
- RSSSF – Italy 2006/07
