= Lorenzo De Silvestri =

Italian footballer (born 1988)

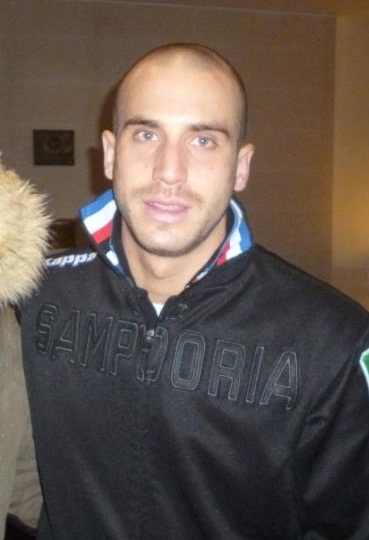
- De Silvestri with Sampdoria in 2013

Personal information
- Date of birth: 23 May 1988 (age 38)
- Place of birth: Rome, Italy
- Height: 1.87 m (6 ft 2 in)
- Position: Right-back

Team information
- Current team: Bologna
- Number: 29

Youth career
- Lazio

Senior career*
Years	Team	Apps	(Gls)
2006–2009	Lazio	47	(0)
2009–2014	Fiorentina	74	(2)
2012–2014	→ Sampdoria (loan)	59	(4)
2014–2016	Sampdoria	50	(5)
2016–2020	Torino	112	(8)
2020–	Bologna	121	(9)

International career
2003–2004	Italy U16	18	(1)
2003–2005	Italy U17	18	(3)
2005	Italy U18	2	(0)
2005–2007	Italy U19	10	(0)
2006	Italy U20	1	(0)
2007–2010	Italy U21	11	(0)
2008	Italy Olympic	6	(0)
2010–2016	Italy	6	(0)
- * Club domestic league appearances and goals as of 19 September 2026

Lorenzo De Silvestri (Italian pronunciation: [loˈrɛntso de silˈvɛstri]; born 23 May 1988) is an Italian professional footballer who plays as a defender for Serie A club Bologna. He is an offensive full-back with an imposing physique; although naturally a right-back, he is capable of playing on either flank as well as in the middle.

== Club career ==
=== Lazio ===
Born in Rome, De Silvestri is a product of Lazio youth academy. He was promoted to the senior team during the 2006–07 season, during which he made his first two league appearances.

His first senior appearance was a match in the UEFA Intertoto Cup in 2005 at the age of 17. His debut in Italian competition came a year later, during a 4–0 Coppa Italia victory over Rende, scoring the fourth goal of the match.

De Silvestri then made his Serie A debut coming on as a substitute, in a 1–0 home loss to Fiorentina, on 22 April 2007. He then made his first start in the penultimate match of the season at the Stadio Olimpico against Parma.

During the 2007–08 season, De Silvestri established himself as a regular in the Lazio side with several impressive performances as an attacking right-back. He made 24 league appearances, as well as six in the UEFA Champions League, three as a starter and three as a substitute.

In 2007, he signed a contract renewal with the club believed to be worth around €350,000, keeping him at Formello until 2010. On 19 November 2007, English football magazine World Soccer included De Silvestri in their list of the 50 most promising talents. He and Andrea Russotto were the only Italians to make the list.

On 19 December 2007, just over a year after his debut goal against Rende, De Silvestri scored again in the Coppa Italia, this time against Napoli. He dedicated his goal to his close friend and fellow Lazio fan Gabriele Sandri, who was shot dead by a policeman at a service area near Arezzo. Since making his debut, De Silvestri has continued to improve the technical and tactical aspects of his game under the guidance of manager Delio Rossi. However a number of disagreement between De Silvestri and his club arose, most notably regarding difficult talks regarding the extension to his contract with Lazio. He also endured a frustrating 2008–09 season playing deputy to new signing Stephan Lichtsteiner and started in only 13 league matches. Due to the contract wrangles and his failure to dislodge Lichtsteiner, led to him being put on sale during the 2009 summer transfer window.

=== Fiorentina ===
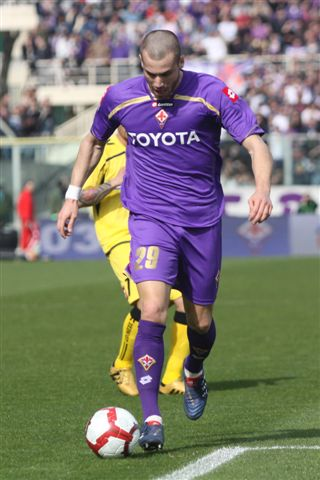
De Silvestri in a Fiorentina jersey

On 26 August 2009, ACF Fiorentina signed the right-back from S.S. Lazio on a five-year deal. He was presented to the press in Florence on 27 August; on successive declarations, De Silvestri stated he had reluctantly decided to leave his favourite club due to his strained relationship with president Claudio Lotito. After an injury that prevented him from appearing in the early weeks of the season, De Silvestri became a regular under head coach Cesare Prandelli and completed the 2009–10 campaign with a total 27 appearances. Under new Fiorentina boss Siniša Mihajlović, De Silvestri was originally confirmed as a regular, but successively lost his place as a starter in favour of Gianluca Comotto after the poor performance the team. However, he re-took the starting position (right-back) after the winter break. He also played the last matches before the winter break as starting left-back to replace the unavailable Manuel Pasqual.

=== Sampdoria ===
On 16 July 2012, De Silvestri was officially loaned to Sampdoria for the 2012–13 season, with Sampdoria having the option to sign him in full following the season. He made his début as a second-half substitute for Gianni Munari against Napoli on 30 September 2012. On 8 May 2013, De Silvestri scored his first goal for Sampdoria by opening the scores in the 1–1 draw against Catania. Following the end of the season, his loan spell was extended for a further season on 12 July 2013. On 18 June 2014, Sampdoria acquired 50% registration rights of De Silvestri. On 25 June 2015, Sampdoria acquired him outright.

=== Torino ===
On 18 August 2016, De Silvestri was signed by Serie A rivals Torino for a reported transfer fee of €3.6 million plus bonuses.

=== Bologna ===
On 17 September 2020, De Silvestri signed with Bologna for free.

== International career ==
De Silvestri made his international debut at the U-16 level in June 2003, the team was mainly consist of born 1987 players aiming for 2004 UEFA European Under-17 Football Championship.

He made his U-21 debut on 11 September 2007 against Albania. He was the youngest player in the squad for Italy's victorious 2008 Toulon Tournament campaign, and also, subsequently, at the 2008 Summer Olympics. Although he played in several of the 2009 European Championship qualifiers, he did not make the 23-man squad for the tournament. After the tournament, he became first-choice and was appointed captain. He was suspended in the playoffs against Belarus in 2011 season.

On 7 September 2010, he made his debut with the Italy national team in a qualification match against Faroe Islands. Italy won the game with 5–0. De Silvestri played the full 90 minutes. On 12 June 2015, he sustained an injury in a 1–1 away draw against Croatia, in a UEFA Euro 2016 qualifying match.

== Career statistics ==
=== Club ===
As of match played 19 September 2026

Appearances and goals by club, season and competition
Club	Season	League			Coppa Italia		Europe		Total	
Club	Season	Division	Apps	Goals	Apps	Goals	Apps	Goals	Apps	Goals
Lazio	2006–07	Serie A	2	0	0	0	—		2	0
Lazio	2007–08	Serie A	24	0	0	0	6 (Note: All appearances in UEFA Champions League)	0	30	0
Lazio	2008–09	Serie A	21	0	1	0	—		22	0
Lazio	Total		47	0	1	0	6	0	54	0
Fiorentina	2009–10	Serie A	26	1	3	0	5	0	34	1
Fiorentina	2010–11	Serie A	26	1	2	0	—		28	1
Fiorentina	2011–12	Serie A	22	0	2	0	—		24	0
Fiorentina	Total		74	2	7	0	5	0	86	2
Sampdoria	2012–13	Serie A	24	2	1	0	—		25	2
Sampdoria	2013–14	Serie A	35	2	1	0	—		36	2
Sampdoria	2014–15	Serie A	33	4	2	0	—		35	4
Sampdoria	2015–16	Serie A	17	1	0	0	—		17	1
Sampdoria	2016–17	Serie A	0	0	1	0	—		1	0
Sampdoria	Total		109	9	5	0	—		114	9
Torino	2016–17	Serie A	16	1	2	0	—		18	1
Torino	2017–18	Serie A	35	5	4	2	—		39	7
Torino	2018–19	Serie A	32	2	2	0	—		34	2
Torino	2019–20	Serie A	29	0	2	1	6 (Note: Appearances in UEFA Europa League)	2	37	3
Torino	Total		112	8	10	3	6	2	128	13
Bologna	2020–21	Serie A	29	2	1	0	—		30	2
Bologna	2021–22	Serie A	31	3	0	0	—		31	3
Bologna	2022–23	Serie A	15	1	2	0	—		17	1
Bologna	2023–24	Serie A	15	2	2	0	—		17	2
Bologna	2024–25	Serie A	18	1	1	0	0	0	19	1
Bologna	2025–26	Serie A	12	0	0	0	0	0	12	0
Bologna	2026–27	Serie A	1	0	0	0	—		1	0
Bologna	Total		121	9	6	0	0	0	127	9
Career total			463	28	29	3	17	2	509	33

=== International ===
Appearances and goals by national team and year
National team	Year	Apps	Goals
Italy	2010	1	0
Italy	2013	1	0
Italy	2014	1	0
Italy	2015	1	0
Italy	2016	2	0
Total		6	0

== Honours ==
Lazio

- Coppa Italia: 2008–09

Bologna

- Coppa Italia: 2024–25

Italy U-21

- Toulon Tournament: 2008
