= Sebastiano Siviglia =

Italian footballer

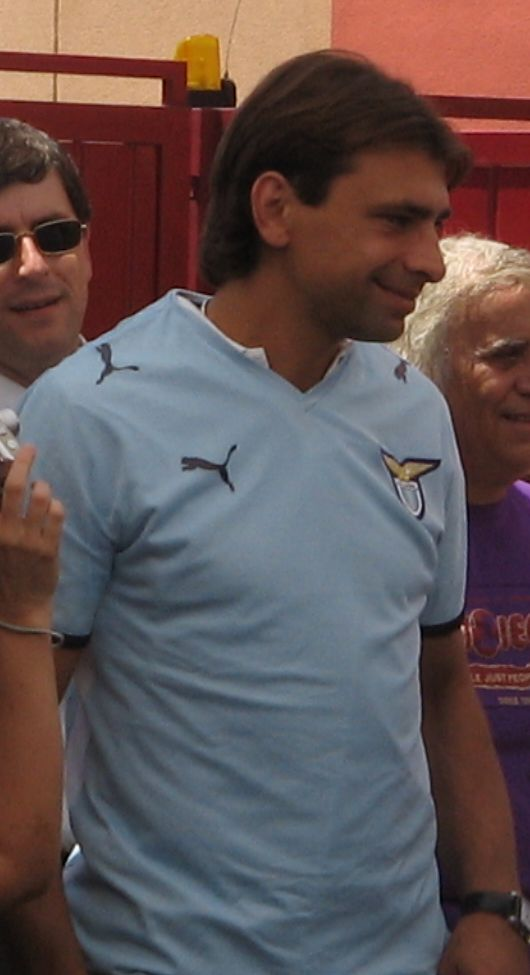

Personal information
- Date of birth: 29 March 1973 (age 53)
- Place of birth: Palizzi, Italy
- Height: 1.82 m (6 ft 0 in)
- Positions: Central defender; right back

Youth career
- 1990–1993: Parma

Senior career*
| Years | Team | Apps | (Gls) |
| 1989–1990 | Audax Ravagnese | 23 | (0) |
| 1993 | Parma | 0 | (0) |
| 1993–1996 | Nocerina | 87 | (2) |
| 1996–1998 | Verona | 58 | (1) |
| 1998–2001 | Atalanta | 88 | (3) |
| 2001–2002 | Roma | 5 | (0) |
| 2002–2005 | Parma | 2 | (0) |
| 2003 | → Atalanta (loan) | 17 | (0) |
| 2003–2004 | → Lecce (loan) | 31 | (0) |
| 2004–2005 | → Lazio (loan) | 29 | (2) |
| 2005–2010 | Lazio | 129 | (8) |

Managerial career
- 2011: Monterotondo
- 2012: Nocerina U19
- 2012–2016: Lazio (youth)
- 2016–2017: Ternana U19
- 2016: Ternana (caretaker)
- 2018–2020: Lecce U19
- 2021: Carpi
- 2022: Potenza
- * Club domestic league appearances and goals

Sebastiano Siviglia (born 29 March 1973) is an Italian football coach and a former player who played as a defender. Throughout his career, Siviglia played over 250 matches in the Italian Serie A for several clubs, in particular Lazio, where he made over 150 league appearances.

== Playing career ==
=== Early career ===
Born in Palizzi, the Province of Reggio Calabria, Siviglia started his senior career at Audax Ravagnese, a Serie D club located in Ravagnese, Reggio Calabria, southern Italy. He then spent three seasons at Parma, located in Emilia–Romagna region in northern Italy.

Siviglia then moved to Serie D side Nocerina in 1993, which finished as runner-up with the Campania side in Group H and promoted to professional football (Serie C2, Italian fourth highest level). He was the Serie C2 Group C Champion in 1995 and promoted again. Siviglia finished the third in Group B with Nocerina, but lost to Ascoli in the promotion playoffs first round (also semi-final).

=== Verona & Atalanta ===
In 1996, he was signed by Serie A side Verona. He played the first Serie A match on 22 September 1996 against Fiorentina as starter, which the Veneto side lost 0–2 to la viola. He played 30 league matches that season (all as starter), and followed the team relegated to Serie B. In 1998, he was signed by newly relegated league rival Atalanta, in exchange with Paolo Foglio, and won promotion back to Serie A in 2000 after finishing 4th. He finished seventh in 2000–01 Serie A season with the Lombardy side, but was provisionally banned two months for suspected match-fixing along with team-mate Fabio Gallo and Luciano Zauri. The ban cleared in May 2001. Siviglia returned to squad on 13 May, against Roma, which lost 0–1 away at Stadio Olimpico. Roma maintained 5 points lead that round (round 30) and ultimately won the Scudetto.

=== Roma and return to Parma ===
On 19 May 2001, Roma agreed to sign Siviglia which Siviglia's contract was reported would expire on 30 June and announced officially on 6 July, but he failed to play regularly. He played five league matches under Fabio Capello, as the club had internationals players Cafu, Aldair, Walter Samuel, Zago, Christian Panucci, Vincent Candela and Jonathan Zebina. He made his UEFA Champions League debut there, on 30 October 2001 against Anderlecht, as starting XI along with Cafu, Aldair and Samuel.

On 30 June 2002, the last day of the 2001–02 fiscal year, he was re-signed by Parma in exchange with Luigi Sartor. Sartor was priced €9.5 million and Siviglia priced €9 million. Roma also swapped their backup players and even youth players for inflated price with other clubs, in order to gain false "profit". As both club got value added on the players they sell, which gave "profit" by selling players, but they were false "profit" because they turned all the revenue they sell to buy registration rights from opposite side also with inflated price, but as the cost was amortized proportionally during the player contract (usually multi-year), which still appeared profit in the first fiscal year balance sheet. Roma finally fined €60,000 by Criminal Court of Rome for irregularity on youth players transfers only on 30 October 2007. But the chairman of both clubs acquitted the false accounting. And inflate the price and cross-trading itself are not illegal, prosecutor failed to prove the purpose behind is illegal against the clubs.

=== Parma & loans ===
Siviglia only played twice for Parma before returned to Atalanta in December 2002 for their Serie A campaign. In August 2003, he left for another Serie A side Lecce, where he partnered with the rising star Cesare Bovo, which also one of the few youth players sold by Roma in 2002 and not a flop. Both players was spotted and shined again, which Siviglia joined Lazio on loan.

=== Lazio ===
==== 2004–05 ====
Although aged 31, Siviglia started to play as a regular for a big club, as Lazio only had Fernando Couto, Paolo Negro and Massimo Oddo remained and Jaap Stam, Siniša Mihajlović and Giuseppe Favalli had left the club. He played 29 league matches that season and four 2004–05 UEFA Cup matches, three as starting XI, out of possible six.

==== 2005–06 ====
On 31 August 2005, the loan deal became permanent, cost €610,000 only for Lazio He signed a three-year contract. Prior to joining Lazio, he also played two matches (all at Coppa Italia) for Parma as starter. Later Couto also joined Parma on free transfer.

Siviglia was selected by Delio Rossi along with Cribari as a central defender pairing and secured sixth place for the club. He only missed a few matches due to injury, like in round 7. and suspended in round 22 & 23 (after received a red card in round 21). But due to the 2006 Italian football scandal, Lazio were deducted 30 points in the 2005–06 season and three points in next season, ruling the biancocelesti out of European competition.

==== 2006–07 ====
In 2006–07 season, Lazio finished third (due to Fiorentina deducted 15 points and finished 6th), which marked a return to the UEFA Champions League. That season, Siviglia played 32 Serie A matches, 31 as starter and was sent off two times and thus suspended twice (round 19, 37 & 38). He was also injured due to a muscle injury in his left thigh and missed the round 28 match.

==== 2007–08 ====
At the start of 2007–08 season, he was injured in a friendly, but he was also offered a new contract which last until June 2010. After he played the first league match of the season on 23 October as starter, he complained of pain and ended up having surgery. On 25 November, he returned to the squad and played 90+ minutes against his former club Parma. Three days later, on 28 November, he played his first UEFA Champions League match and the second in his career against Olympiakos; the match resulted in a 1–2 loss at home. He then only missed round 18 and 36 due to suspension, and rested against Parma on round 34. He also played the last group stage match against Real Madrid after they lost to Olympiacos. He was not selected for the match before the Coppa Italia semi-final, but played the full match on 7 May the 2-0, which they lost to Internazionale in the Cup. After that match, his season ended pre-maturely, due to injury; he was not selected for the last match against Napoli, as Lazio didn't qualify for European competition, finishing seven points away from the eighth-placed Napoli, who qualified for the 2008 UEFA Intertoto Cup.

==== 2008–09 ====
As one of the most experienced players in the squad, Siviglia had deputized as captain on many occasions, and before the start of the 2008–09 season, he was selected as vice-captain behind Tommaso Rocchi and Cristian Ledesma.

He missed two months again since November 2008 due to injury He returned to the squad on 22 January 2010 against Torino in the Coppa Italia. He then missed round 23 after receiving his fourth yellow card of the season. He played for Lazio in the 2009 Coppa Italia Final, in which Lazio beat Sampdoria after a penalty shootout; it was Siviglia's first major honour. As Lazio qualified for next season's UEFA Europa League, he was rested again for round 37, and suspended for round 36, due to receiving another four yellow cards.

==== 2009–10 ====
Siviglia started the 2009–10 season by winning against Internazionale in the 2009 Supercoppa Italiana. As he had only one year left on his contract with Lazio and aged 36, he became less active as part of the starting XI, partially due to injury and the coach failing to find the best central pair. Siviglia and Cribari at first were the starting centre backs under the new coach Davide Ballardini. He played both legs of the UEFA Europa League play-off round, but was replaced by Aleksandar Kolarov in the 23rd minute on 27 August 2009, as he suffered muscle problems.

Siviglia returned on 12 September against Juventus, partnering with Modibo Diakité and lost 0–2. In the next game, the opening match of the Europa League group stage, the coach preferred Diakité and Cribari, but then Siviglia partnered with Diakité again in the fourth round of Serie A. In the next match (round 5), in although he was the starter, he was replaced by Cribari in the 35th minute, again due to injury.

Siviglia returned in round 8 against Sampdoria, but as a right back, and Cribari-Diakité were the starting pair. For the match against Villarreal, Siviglia did not have a place in the final XI, as the coach preferred Ștefan Radu partnered with Cribari, and Diakité was the only central back on the bench.

With Lazio struggling to win, the starting line-up was unstable. Siviglia was not selected for the match against Bari in round 9, but returned in round 10, this time partnered with Radu, although Cribari and Diakitè also featured. But Ballardini's experiment failed again, and they lost to Cagliari 0–1; the experiment continued in the next match, a 1–1 draw with Siena in round 11. Four days later, he traveled to Spain for the European match against Villarreal, in which he partnered with Diakite again and Radu moved to fullback position, but he was substituted at half-time with Mauro Zárate in order strengthen the attack. Ultimately, Lazio lost 1–4. Ballardini resumed the experimental Siviglia-Radu pair and the coach disliked Cribari who often collect yellow cards, but the team lost again to Milan in round 12. Siviglia was then injured again.

On 6 December, Siviglia returned to play as an unused substitute in the Derby della Capitale (round 15). In the next match, Siviglia formed a three-man defence, along with Radu and Guglielmo Stendardo in a 3-5-2 formation, which finally led to a second win of the league, and the first for Siviglia against Genoa. Then, in the next European match, Lazio replaced him with a back-up player. Three days after that game, Siviglia played as one of the a three-man defence again in the 0–1 lost to Inter on 20 December (round 17). Siviglia also secured a place in the three-man defence in the next two matches, including the third league win against Livorno. Since the arrival of the new coach Edoardo Reja, he did not play in the game against Palermo in the Coppa Italia, but returned as part of the three-man defence in the next match (round 20). After playing as an unused sub in the Coppa Italia, he played as a starting centre-back, partnering with Stendardo (in a 4-3-3 formation), against Chievo, which ended in a hard-fought draw.

After that match (round 21), he was favoured by the coach and returned to the starting XI in round 26, partnering again with Stendardo; the game ended in a 1–1 draw with Fiorentina. In the next two matches, the 3-5-2 formation was re-introduced and Siviglia played as a starter; Lazio lost both games.

But, in mid-March, he suffered muscle problems again. Siviglia returned to the field on 25 April, replacing Simone Del Nero in the last minute.

On 15 May, in the last game of the season, Siviglia returned to the starting XI, with new experimental partners André Dias and Giuseppe Biava in their 3-5-2 formation. Before the match, both teams secured a place in next season's Serie A and Lazio beat Udinese 3–1.

== Coaching career ==
On 12 July 2016, Siviglia was hired as the coach of the Under-19 squad of Serie B club Ternana. On 11 August 2016, Christian Panucci, who was hired as the head coach for the senior squad of Ternana earlier that summer, was fired by the club after one game in charge. On 12 August, Siviglia was appointed a temporary head coach. On 13 August, Siviglia coached Ternana in a Coppa Italia game against Cesena, a 0–2 loss. On 14 August, a new permanent coach Benito Carbone was hired and Siviglia moved back to the Under-19 squad.

In July 2021, he was appointed head coach of Serie C club Carpi. However, Carpi were not allowed to enter the 2021–22 Serie C season for financial reasons, and a different Carpi-based club called Athletic Carpi were entered into Serie D, with Siviglia not involved in the new club.

On 13 June 2022, Siviglia was unveiled as the new head coach of Serie C club Potenza. On 24 October 2022, he was dismissed following a negative start in the club's 2022–23 Serie C campaign.

== Career statistics ==
As of 15 May 2010

| Club performance | | | League | | Cup | | Continental | | Total | |
| Season | Club | League | Apps | Goals | Apps | Goals | Apps | Goals | Apps | Goals |
| Italy | | | League | | Cup | | Continental | | Total | |
|---|---|---|---|---|---|---|---|---|---|---|
| 1989–1990 | Audax Ravagnese | Interregionale | 23 | 0 | ? | ? | | | ? | ? |
| 1993–94 | Nocerina | CND | 24 | 0 | ? | ? | | | ? | ? |
| 1994–95 | Nocerina | Serie C2 | 33 | 2 | ? | ? | | | ? | ? |
| 1995–96 | Nocerina | Serie C1 | 30 | 0 | ? | ? | | | ? | ? |
| 1996–97 | Verona | Serie A | 30 | 1 | 2 | 0 | | | 32 | 1 |
| 1997–98 | Verona | Serie B | 28 | 0 | 4 | 1 | | | 32 | 1 |
| 1998–99 | Atalanta | Serie B | 32 | 2 | 6 | 0 | | | 38 | 2 |
| 1999–2000 | Atalanta | Serie B | 30 | 1 | 7 | 0 | | | 37 | 1 |
| 2000–01 | Atalanta | Serie A | 26 | 0 | 7 | 0 | | | 33 | 0 |
| 2001–02 | Roma | Serie A | 5 | 0 | 1 | 0 | 1 | 0 | 7 | 0 |
| 2002–03 | Parma | Serie A | 2 | 0 | 1 | 0 | 1 | 0 | 4 | 0 |
| 2002–03 | Atalanta | Serie A | 17 | 3 | | | | | 17 | 3 |
| 2003–04 | Lecce | Serie A | 31 | 0 | 0 | 0 | | | 31 | 0 |
| 2004–05 | Lazio | Serie A | 29 | 2 | 1 | 0 | 4 | 0 | 34 | 2 |
| 2005–06 | Parma | Serie A | 0 | 0 | 2 | 0 | | | 2 | 0 |
| 2005–06 | Lazio | Serie A | 31 | 1 | | | | | 31 | 1 |
| 2006–07 | Lazio | Serie A | 32 | 3 | 2 | 0 | | | 34 | 3 |
| 2007–08 | Lazio | Serie A | 19 | 1 | 6 | 0 | 2 | 0 | 27 | 1 |
| 2008–09 | Lazio | Serie A | 27 | 2 | 5 | 0 | | | 32 | 2 |
| 2009–10 | Lazio | Serie A | 20 | 1 | 0 | 0 | 3 | 0 | 24^{1} | 1 |
| Career total | | | 469 | 19 | ? | ? | 11 | 0 | ? | ? |

^{1} Included 1 appearance at Supercoppa Italiana

== Honours ==
=== Club ===
Roma

- Supercoppa Italiana (1): 2001

Lazio

- Coppa Italia (1): 2008–09
- Supercoppa Italiana (1): 2009

Nocerina

- Serie C2 (1): 1994–95
