= Tommaso Berni =

Retired goalkeeper

Personal information
- Date of birth: 6 March 1983 (age 43)
- Place of birth: Florence, Italy
- Height: 1.85 m (6 ft 1 in)
- Position: Goalkeeper

Youth career
- Fiorentina
- 1998–2001: Inter Milan

Senior career*
Years	Team	Apps	(Gls)
2001–2003	Wimbledon	0	(0)
2003–2006	Ternana	82	(0)
2006–2011	Lazio	8	(0)
2009	→ Salernitana (loan)	16	(0)
2011–2012	Braga	1	(0)
2012–2013	Sampdoria	3	(0)
2013–2014	Torino	0	(0)
2014–2020	Inter Milan	0	(0)
Total		108	(0)

International career
1999	Italy U16	2	(0)
2000	Italy U17	2	(0)
2000–2001	Italy U18	4	(0)
2001	Italy U19	7	(0)
2002–2003	Italy U20	9	(0)
2002–2005	Italy U21	3	(0)
- * Club domestic league appearances and goals as of 5 July 2017

Tommaso Berni (born 6 March 1983) is a retired Italian professional footballer who last played as a goalkeeper for Inter Milan.

== Club career ==
=== Early career ===
Berni started his career at Fiorentina. In 1998, he joined Inter Milan. He was a backup goalkeeper for their Primavera youth team in 2001 Torneo di Viareggio. Marco Varaldi was the starting keeper.

In March 2001, Berni moved to England, joining Wimbledon, but never made a first team appearance. He was released on 30 June 2003.

In mid-2003, he joined Ternana in Serie B.

=== Lazio ===
Berni left for Lazio in mid-2006 on a temporary deal as Ternana was relegated to 2006–07 Serie C1. Just before the January transfer window closed, Lazio bought his full ownership for €1.5 million from Ternana, as Lazio needed a backup goalkeeper due to Angelo Peruzzi set to leave and Marco Ballotta's advancing years. He signed a contract with Lazio which lasted until June 2011.

He made his Serie A debut on 20 May 2007 against Parma, the 37th match day of the season as Lazio had already qualified for 2007–08 UEFA Champions League third qualifying round. In 2007–08 season, Berni was the third-choice keeper behind Marco Ballotta and new signing Fernando Muslera. When Juan Pablo Carrizo was signed by Lazio in June 2008, Berni was loaned to Salernitana of Serie B to seek first team football in February 2009. Since arrived at Salernitana, he displaced Salvatore Pinna to the bench.

=== SC Braga ===
On 29 June 2011, Portuguese club S.C. Braga signed Berni on a free transfer.

=== Sampdoria ===
On 24 August 2012, Berni joined Serie A club Sampdoria after one season at Braga.

=== Inter Milan ===
On 2 July 2014, Berni returned to Inter Milan on a one-year contract as one of the four homegrown players of Inter in 2014–15 UEFA Europa League. However, he was not eligible as a youth product of Inter, as he only spent less than three years in the youth system of Inter.

On 3 June 2015, Tommaso agreed to extend his contract by twelve months. He was offered a one-year contract again on 1 July 2016, as one of the four homegrown players in 2016–17 UEFA Europa League. However, he was not registered in Serie A, as the regulation allowed to replace one keeper with another on the list, in case of emergency. Due to not on the list since September, Berni still received call-up from the coach for Serie A matches, but never appeared on the bench. Juan Pablo Carrizo was the second keeper instead in domestic match since September. After five days as free agent, on 5 July 2017, Berni signed a new one-year contract again. With his contract set to expire on 30 June, Berni would again sign a one-year contract extension to keep him at Inter until 30 June 2019. He signed another one-year contract on 28 June 2019. He also got two red cards despite zero appearances in six years.

He was released by Inter at the end of 2019–20 season and formally retired a week after.

== International career ==
Berni has been capped by the Italian youth teams, from as young as the U16s to the U21 side, and finished runners-up with the Italian U20 team at the Toulon Tournament in 2002 and 2003. He received two caps for the Italy U17 side (called U16 team until 2001) at the 2000 UEFA European Under-16 Football Championship qualification and Italy U19 side at the 2002 UEFA European Under-19 Football Championship that reached the third qualifying round. He made one appearance in the 2006 UEFA European Under-21 Football Championship qualification.

== Career statistics ==
=== Club ===
As of 29 September 2019

Club	Season	League			Cup		Europe		Other		Total	
Club	Season	League	Apps	Goals	Apps	Goals	Apps	Goals	Apps	Goals	Apps	Goals
Wimbledon	2002–03	First Division	0	0	0	0	—		—		0	0
Ternana	2003–04	Serie B	9	0	0	0	—		—		9	0
Ternana	2004–05	Serie B	36	0	3	0	—		—		39	0
Ternana	2005–06	Serie B	37	0	2	0	—		—		39	0
Lazio	2006–07	Serie A	2	0	0	0	—		—		2	0
Lazio	2007–08	Serie A	0	0	0	0	0	0	—		0	0
Lazio	2008–09	Serie A	0	0	0	0	—		—		0	0
Salernitana (loan)	2008–09	Serie B	16	0	0	0	—		—		16	0
Lazio	2009–10	Serie A	2	0	0	0	—		—		2	0
Lazio	2010–11	Serie A	2	0	3	0	—		—		5	0
Braga	2011–12	Primiera Liga	1	0	2	0	0	0	2 (Note: All appearance(s) in Taça da Liga.)	0	5	0
Sampdoria	2012–13	Serie A	3	0	0	0	—		—		3	0
Torino	2013–14	Serie A	0	0	0	0	—		—		0	0
Internazionale	2014–15	Serie A	0	0	0	0	0	0	—		0	0
Internazionale	2015–16	Serie A	0	0	0	0	—		—		0	0
Internazionale	2016–17	Serie A	0	0	0	0	0	0	—		0	0
Internazionale	2017–18	Serie A	0	0	0	0	—		—		0	0
Internazionale	2018–19	Serie A	0	0	0	0	0	0	—		0	0
Internazionale	2019–20	Serie A	0	0	0	0	0	0	—		0	0
Career total			108	0	10	0	0	0	2	0	120	0
