= Cristiano Gimelli =

Italian footballer (born 1982)

Personal information
- Date of birth: 15 February 1982 (age 44)
- Place of birth: Rome, Italy
- Height: 1.85 m (6 ft 1 in)
- Position: Defender

Youth career
- 2001–2002: Alba Longa (Serie D)
- 2002–2003: Guidonia Montecelio (Serie D)
- 2003–2004: Ostia Mare (Serie D)

Senior career*
Years	Team	Apps	(Gls)
2004–2009	Lazio	0	(0)
2005	→ Casale (loan)	0	(0)
2005–2006	→ Viterbese (loan)	17	(0)
2007	→ Lanciano (co-ownership)	3	(0)
- * Club domestic league appearances and goals

Cristiano Gimelli (born 15 February 1982) is an Italian football defender.

Gimelli played at Serie D clubs at Rome. In September 2004, he signed a 5-year contract with Lazio. He went on loan to Casale, Viterbese of Serie C2, before joined Lanciano in co-ownership deal. In June 2007, he returned to Lazio, but went on loan to Serie D club F.C. Rieti in mid-2007, Flaminia Civita Castellana in mid-2008 and Civitavecchia in September 2008.
