= List of Italian football transfers summer 2008 =

List of Italian football transfers summer 2008 may refer to:

- List of Italian football transfers summer 2008 (July)
- List of Italian football transfers summer 2008 (August)
- List of Italian football transfers summer 2008 (co-ownership)
