= Fabrizio Melara =

Italian footballer

Personal information
- Date of birth: 6 May 1986 (age 40)
- Place of birth: Rome, Italy
- Height: 1.88 m (6 ft 2 in)
- Position: Midfielder

Team information
- Current team: Santa Marinella 1947

Youth career
- Lazio

Senior career*
Years	Team	Apps	(Gls)
2005–2006	Salernitana	3	(0)
2006	Sambenedettese	7	(0)
2006–2007	Rieti	32	(2)
2007–2008	Massese	23	(0)
2008–2010	Pro Patria	54	(5)
2011–2012	SPAL	49	(2)
2012–2013	Reggina	31	(2)
2013	Carpi	14	(1)
2013–2014	Lecce	14	(0)
2014–2018	Benevento	85	(10)
2018–2020	Juve Stabia	46	(1)
2020–2021	Atletico Fiuggi	11	(1)
2022–	Santa Marinella 1947		
- * Club domestic league appearances and goals

Fabrizio Melara (born 6 May 1986) is an Italian professional footballer who plays as a midfielder for ASD Santa Marinella 1947.
