= Braian Robert =

Argentine footballer (born 1984)

Personal information
- Date of birth: February 8, 1984 (age 42)
- Place of birth: Argentina
- Position: Midfielder

Senior career*
Years	Team	Apps	(Gls)
2001–2003	Gimnasia	4	(0)
2003–2004	Independiente	1	(0)
2005–2006	Lazio	0	(0)
2005	→ Catanzaro (loan)	7	(1)
2006–2007	La Plata	14	(2)
2008	Almagro	17	(1)
2008	Talleres	12	(0)
2009–2010	Platense	58	(3)
- * Club domestic league appearances and goals

Braian Robert (born 8 February 1984) is an Argentine former footballer.

== Early life ==
Robert was born in 1984 in La Plata, Argentina. Robert started his career with Argentine side Gimnasia. He is the son of a former vice president of the club.

== Career ==
In 2003, Robert signed for Argentine side Independiente. In 2005, he signed for Italian Serie A side Lazio. After that, he was sent on loan to Italian side Catanzaro. He debuted for the club against Catania. He scored his first goal for the club against Ascoli. In 2006, he signed for Argentine side La Plata. In 2008, he signed for Argentine side Almagro. After that, he signed for Argentine side Talleres. In 2009, he signed for Argentine side Platense.

== Style of play ==
Robert started his career as a striker. He then operated as an attacking midfielder while playing for Gimnasia.
