= Riccardo Bonetto =

Italian football of Bassano Virtus

Personal information
- Date of birth: 20 March 1979 (age 47)
- Place of birth: Asolo, Italy
- Height: 1.77 m (5 ft 9 1/2 in)
- Positions: Left back; left winger

Youth career
- Juventus

Senior career*
Years	Team	Apps	(Gls)
1997–2001	Juventus	0	(0)
1997–1998	→ Novara (loan)	15	(1)
1998	→ Fermana (loan)	0	(0)
1999	→ Beveren (loan)	19	(2)
2000–2001	→ Arezzo (loan)	30	(3)
2001–2006	Empoli	64	(2)
2002	→ Ascoli (loan)	11	(0)
2003	→ Lucchese (loan)	13	(0)
2006	→ Ascoli (loan)	0	(0)
2006–2011	Lazio	9	(0)
2007–2008	→ Bologna (loan)	33	(0)
2008–2009	→ Livorno (loan)	38	(0)
2011–2012	Bassano Virtus	22	(0)
2012	Pergine		
2013–2016	Istrana		
- * Club domestic league appearances and goals

Riccardo Bonetto (born 20 March 1979) is an Italian former footballer who played as a defender or midfielder.

== Career ==
He also played at Serie A level with Empoli and Livorno. Bonetto was sold to Empoli in co-ownership deal in 2001 from Juve, for €516,000. In June 2003 Juventus gave up the remain registration rights to Empoli.
