= Stefano Mauri =

Italian former footballer (born 1980)

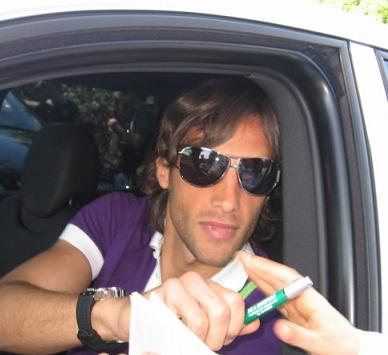
- Mauri signing an autograph in 2009

Personal information
- Date of birth: 8 January 1980 (age 46)
- Place of birth: Monza, Italy
- Height: 1.84 m (6 ft 0 in)
- Position: Attacking midfielder

Youth career
- 1996–1997: Brugherio

Senior career*
| Years | Team | Apps | (Gls) |
| 1997–1998 | Brugherio | 23 | (10) |
| 1998–2001 | Meda | 83 | (12) |
| 2001–2004 | Modena | 34 | (2) |
| 2003–2004 | → Brescia (loan) | 30 | (7) |
| 2004–2006 | Udinese | 48 | (5) |
| 2006–2016 | Lazio | 253 | (42) |
| 2017 | Brescia | 12 | (1) |

International career
| 2004–2011 | Italy | 11 | (0) |
- * Club domestic league appearances and goals as of 20 July 2017 (UTC)

Stefano Mauri (Italian pronunciation: [ˈsteːfano ˈmauri]; born 8 January 1980) is an Italian former footballer, who spent most of his career with Lazio, also serving as the club's captain. A versatile midfielder, he was capable of playing as an attacking midfielder, as a central midfielder, and as a winger, or even in a more advanced role, as a second striker, courtesy of his dribbling skills, precise passing, and playmaking ability. Although predominantly left-footed, he was also capable of striking or passing the ball well with his right foot.

== Club career ==
=== Early career ===
Mauri started his career at 16 years of age with Brugherio. Two years later he moved to Meda, where he spent three years between Serie C2 and Serie D.

In 2001, he joined Modena, and in September 2002, he made his Serie A debut in a 3–0 loss to Milan. With the gialloblù, Mauri spent two good seasons before moving on loan to Brescia for the 2003–04 season.

At Brescia, he played another good season with 30 appearances and seven goals. In 2004, he joined Udinese on a co-ownership deal. He spent two seasons at the Stadio Friuli, yet he lost his place as a regular starter in the second season.

=== Lazio ===
In 2006, Mauri moved south to Rome where he joined Lazio. He made his Biancoceleste debut in a Coppa Italia match against Inter and continued to establish himself as a regular, becoming a key player in a high-flying Lazio team.

Manager Delio Rossi began to use him as a trequartista, behind Goran Pandev and Tommaso Rocchi, and he continued to shine, being a protagonist in Lazio's qualification for the UEFA Champions League.

In 2010, Mauri continued his form, becoming a crucial player in Edoardo Reja's team as an attacking midfielder. He now predominantly plays on the left wing, providing flair, assists and important goals for the team.

In early 2012, Mauri sustained a heavy injury that kept him out of action for four months. He made a comeback in early March 2012. He came back to lead Lazio as captain in the Derby Della Capitale and scored the winning goal, celebrating under the Curva Nord. Mauri scored spectacular overhead kick against Napoli. He was visited by national team boss Cesare Prandelli after his good form.

In the 2012–13 season Mauri was still a pivotal part of the Lazio starting line up and became Lazio's full-time captain after Rocchi left the club. On 11 November 2012, in terrible conditions, he scored the winning goal in the Derby against Roma, after being hit in the face by Roma player De Rossi. Under Vladimir Petkovic Mauri's fitness improved together with being crucial with his movements, assists and goals.

On 2 October 2013, Mauri had his ban for falling to report match fixing increased to nine months, though it later on 10 January 2014 was decreased to six months again, which made him available for play from 2 February 2014 and able to once again lead Lazio in the Derby against Roma on 9 February 2014.

On 30 May 2014, Mauri signed a new one-year contract. On 9 July 2015, he announced his departure from Lazio after almost ten years with the club. On 21 August 2015 it was announced that Mauri re-joined Lazio.

=== Return to Brescia ===
Following the expiration of his contract with Lazio in July 2016, Mauri became a free agent and remained without a club for the first half of the 2016–17 season. On 11 January 2017, Mauri joined Serie B side Brescia; this was his second spell with the club and the first time he had played for the team since his loan deal ended in 2004.

== International career ==
Mauri made his international debut in November 2004 against Finland under Marcello Lippi, and went on to receive 11 caps. He has not been selected as part of a squad for any major tournaments and never represented Italy at youth level. Mauri was called up to the Italy national team by Cesare Prandelli for the nation's UEFA Euro 2012 qualifiers against Northern Ireland and Serbia after his positive form with S.S. Lazio and an impressive start to the Serie A campaign.

== Personal life ==
On 28 May 2012, Mauri was arrested by Italian Police for his alleged involvement in the Calcioscommesse sports betting scandal. He was given a six-month ban in 2013 for failing to report match fixing, Subsequent appeals saw the ban being increased to nine months, then reduced back to six months.

== Career statistics ==
As of match played 31 May 2016.

| Club performance | | | League | | Cup | | Continental | | Total | |
| Season | Club | League | Apps | Goals | Apps | Goals | Apps | Goals | Apps | Goals |
| Italy | | | League | | Coppa Italia | | Europe | | Total | |
|---|---|---|---|---|---|---|---|---|---|---|
| 1997–98 | Brugherio | Dilettanti | 23 | 10 | 0 | 0 | 0 | 0 | 23 | 10 |
| 1998–99 | Meda | Serie D | 30 | 9 | 0 | 0 | 0 | 0 | 30 | 9 |
| 1999–00 | Meda | Serie C2 | 21 | 1 | 0 | 0 | 0 | 0 | 21 | 1 |
| 2000–01 | Meda | Serie C2 | 32 | 2 | 0 | 0 | 0 | 0 | 32 | 2 |
| Total Meda | | | 83 | 12 | 0 | 0 | 0 | 0 | 83 | 12 |
| 2002–03 | Modena | Serie B | 9 | 1 | 0 | 0 | 0 | 0 | 9 | 1 |
| 2002–03 | Modena | Serie A | 25 | 1 | 0 | 0 | 0 | 0 | 25 | 1 |
| Total Modena | | | 34 | 2 | 0 | 0 | 0 | 0 | 34 | 2 |
| 2003–04 | Brescia | Serie A | 30 | 7 | 0 | 0 | 0 | 0 | 30 | 7 |
| 2004–05 | Udinese | Serie A | 32 | 5 | 0 | 0 | 2 | 1 | 34 | 6 |
| 2005–06 | Udinese | Serie A | 16 | 0 | 0 | 0 | 7 | 0 | 23 | 0 |
| Total Udinese | | | 48 | 5 | 0 | 0 | 9 | 0 | 57 | 6 |
| 2005–06 | Lazio | Serie A | 15 | 2 | 0 | 0 | 0 | 0 | 15 | 2 |
| 2006–07 | Lazio | Serie A | 29 | 6 | 0 | 0 | 0 | 0 | 29 | 6 |
| 2007–08 | Lazio | Serie A | 24 | 3 | 5 | 0 | 4 | 0 | 33 | 3 |
| 2008–09 | Lazio | Serie A | 26 | 1 | 5 | 2 | 0 | 0 | 31 | 3 |
| 2009–10 | Lazio | Serie A | 35 | 3 | 4 | 0 | 6 | 1 | 45 | 4 |
| 2010–11 | Lazio | Serie A | 29 | 6 | 1 | 0 | 0 | 0 | 30 | 6 |
| 2011–12 | Lazio | Serie A | 16 | 4 | 0 | 0 | 3 | 1 | 19 | 5 |
| 2012–13 | Lazio | Serie A | 26 | 3 | 4 | 1 | 6 | 0 | 36 | 4 |
| 2013–14 | Lazio | Serie A | 12 | 4 | 0 | 0 | 0 | 0 | 12 | 4 |
| 2014–15 | Lazio | Serie A | 29 | 9 | 2 | 0 | 0 | 0 | 31 | 9 |
| 2015–16 | Lazio | Serie A | 12 | 1 | 1 | 0 | 6 | 0 | 19 | 1 |
| Total Lazio | | | 253 | 42 | 22 | 3 | 25 | 2 | 300 | 47 |
| Career total | | | 460 | 76 | 36 | 7 | 34 | 3 | 517 | 84 |

== Honours ==
Lazio

- Coppa Italia: 2008–09, 2012–13
- Supercoppa Italiana: 2009
