= Gaby Mudingayi =

Belgian footballer (born 1981)

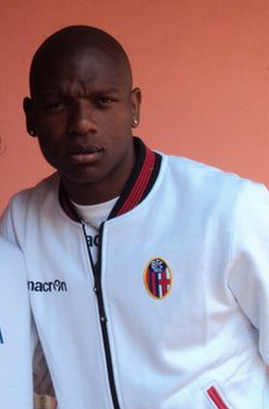
- Mundigayi with Bologna in 2011

Personal information
- Full name: Gabriel Mudingayi
- Date of birth: 1 October 1981 (age 45)
- Place of birth: Kinshasa, Zaire
- Height: 1.80 m (5 ft 11 in)
- Position: Midfielder

Senior career*
Years	Team	Apps	(Gls)
1998–2000	Union Saint-Gilloise	35	(1)
2000–2004	Gent	63	(0)
2004–2005	Torino	34	(1)
2005–2008	Lazio	69	(1)
2008–2013	Bologna	128	(2)
2012–2013	→ Inter Milan (loan)	9	(0)
2013–2014	Inter Milan	1	(0)
2015	Cesena	9	(0)
2016–2017	Pisa	2	(0)
Total		350	(5)

International career
2002–2003	Belgium U21	8	(0)
2003–2008	Belgium	18	(0)
- * Club domestic league appearances and goals

Gabriel "Gaby" Mudingayi (born 1 October 1981) is a former professional footballer who played as a midfielder. Born in Zaire, he represented the Belgium national team at international level.

== Career ==
=== Early years ===
Mudingayi moved to Belgium at a young age and started his career at the third division club Union Saint-Gilloise. He spent two seasons with the club before moving to Jupiler League side Gent, aged 19.

Mudingayi established himself in the club's starting XI during the following campaigns, and was selected to represent Belgium at both youth and senior level for the first time.

=== Move to Italy: Torino and Lazio ===
In January 2004 Mudingayi joined Italian Serie B side Torino, helping the club win promotion back to Serie A in 2005. However, the club went bankrupt, releasing all the players as free agents. He moved to Lazio in August 2005.

After struggling with injuries, Mudingayi scored his first and only goal for Lazio on 8 January 2006, in a 4–1 win over Ascoli. However, on 22 April, in a 1–1 away draw against Juventus, his leg was broken in a tackle by Fabio Cannavaro.

Mudingayi only became a regular starter in the 2006–07 campaign, under Delio Rossi, appearing in 28 matches.

=== Bologna ===
On 21 July 2008, Mudingayi was sold to newly promoted team Bologna for €7 million, on a five-year contract. with part of the transfer receivable of Lazio was converted to the signing of Mourad Meghni outright, for an additional €1.75m.

Mudingayi was an ever-present figure for the rossoblu during his spell, appearing in nearly 30 matches per season.

=== Inter Milan ===
On 20 July 2012, Inter Milan announced that they had signed Mudingayi from Bologna on loan, with an option to purchase. The loan fee was €750,000. Behind Esteban Cambiasso, Walter Gargano and Zdravko Kuzmanović, he only appeared in nine matches during the campaign. Mudingayi also injured his Achilles tendon in January.

In May 2013, after Gargano's departure, Mudingayi was signed permanently by the Nerazzurri for an additional €750,000 fee. on a two-year contract. However, he went on to appear only eight minutes during the whole season, being released in the following year.

=== Elche ===
On 20 October 2014, Mudingayi signed a one-year deal with La Liga side Elche CF. However, he could not be registered due to the club's financial troubles, and left on 3 February of the following year.

=== Cesena ===
On 11 February 2015, he was signed by Cesena.

=== Pisa ===
In October 2016 Mudingayi was signed by Pisa. He was released on 31 January 2017.
