= Tommaso Rocchi =

Italian footballer (born 1977)

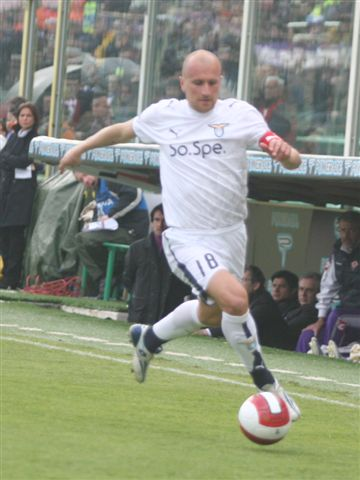
- Rocchi playing for Lazio in 2008

Personal information
- Date of birth: 19 September 1977 (age 49)
- Place of birth: Venice, Italy
- Height: 1.77 m (5 ft 10 in)
- Position: Striker

Youth career
- 1986–1993: Venezia
- 1994–1996: Juventus

Senior career*
Years	Team	Apps	(Gls)
1995–1998	Juventus	0	(0)
1996–1997	→ Pro Patria (loan)	27	(6)
1997	→ Fermana (loan)	4	(0)
1997–1998	→ Saronno (loan)	28	(10)
1998–2000	Como	64	(21)
2000–2001	Treviso	37	(8)
2001–2004	Empoli	104	(28)
2004–2013	Lazio	244	(82)
2013	Inter Milan	13	(3)
2013–2014	Padova	18	(5)
2014–2015	Haladás	17	(3)
2015–2016	Tatabánya	6	(2)
Total		664	(168)

International career
1995	Italy U17	7	(4)
1995–1996	Italy U18	8	(3)
1998	Italy U21	1	(1)
2008	Italy Olympic (O.P.)	2	(1)
2006–2007	Italy	3	(0)
- * Club domestic league appearances and goals

Tommaso Rocchi (Italian pronunciation: [tomˈmaːzo ˈrɔkki]; born 19 September 1977) is an Italian former professional footballer who played as striker. He spent a large part of his career with Lazio and is the club's sixth highest goalscorer of all time, three behind Bruno Giordano. At international level, Rocchi earned three caps for the Italy national team.

== Club career ==
=== Early years ===
Born in Venice, Rocchi began playing football in his home city and joined the youth ranks of Venezia at nine years of age. He came up through the ranks in the Venezia junior system before signing for giants Juventus in 1994. Rocchi won the Primavera title with the Turin club that year before moving up to the first team for the 1995–96 season, in which the bianconeri claimed the Champions League title. He did not make any first team appearances however, and soon left the club.

From then on, Rocchi played Serie C football (mainly in Serie C1), playing in 121 matches and scoring 36 goals for Pro Patria, Fermana, Saronno and Como. Como bought Rocchi for 300 million lire (€154,937) in 1998 in co-ownership deal. In June 2000 Como bought Rocchi outright for 900 million lire (€464,811), 600 million lire (€309,874) excess the original fee. He managed to get a chance in Serie B with Treviso, which Como sold half of the registration rights to Treviso in 2000 for 1.4 billion lire (€723,040) and bought back in June 2001.

=== Empoli ===
From Treviso (via Como), Rocchi moved to Tuscany with Empoli, also in Serie B at the time. With Empoli, Rocchi made over 100 appearances, and scored a total of 29 goals, 16 of which came in Serie A, where Rocchi had put in some decent performances during the 2002–03 and 2003–04 seasons. He scored a winner against Inter Milan on 18 January 2004, and a week later, he scored a hattrick against original club Juventus in a 3–3 draw.

=== Lazio ===
These performances earned Rocchi a €1.5 million move to Lazio for the 2004–05 season, in another co-ownership deal.

Rocchi's first goal of the championship for Lazio came on 22 September 2004 against Brescia at the Stadio Mario Rigamonti in a 2–0 win. His finest individual performance of the season was a hattrick against Lecce, and Rocchi ended a successful debut season with 13 goals in 35 league appearances. He also scored twice in the 2004–05 UEFA Cup, his first appearance in European competition. Most significantly however, Rocchi scored the third goal in a 3–1 Derby della Capitale win, the first of these clashes in which he played. In June 2005 Lazio bought him outright for another €2.5 million.

It was during this time that Rocchi began to develop a partnership with teammate Paolo Di Canio. Often creating assists for each other, Rocchi and Di Canio had a good relationship both on and off the field. Di Canio left Lazio in 2006, leaving Rocchi as the major star striker at the club.

Rocchi also had a strong partnership with Macedonian forward Goran Pandev. Often Pandev would play in the hole behind Rocchi, but they were also able to play up front together with a central attacking midfielder behind. Between them, they were Lazio's top goalscorers for three seasons consecutively. A positive 2005–06 season saw Rocchi score a personal best 16 league goals as Lazio finished sixth, a place which was later taken away from them due to the Calciopoli scandal. At first relegation to Serie B was the verdict, but Lazio were soon reinstated to the top flight.

Beginning the 2006–07 season with an eleven-point deduction, a relegation battle appeared on the cards for Lazio, and a slow start did nothing to help the situation. However, the team's form soon improved, and the deduction was reduced to three, making a tilt at a UEFA Champions League place an unlikely yet possible goal. Rocchi backed up his 16-goal haul yet again, as Lazio finished third and qualified for Europe's premier club competition.

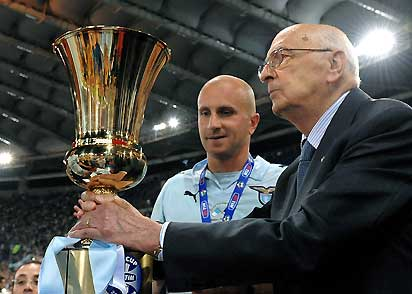
Rocchi receives the Coppa Italia trophy from Giorgio Napolitano.

The 2007–08 season saw Rocchi make his personal debut in the UEFA Champions League, where he scored a crucial winning goal against Werder Bremen. This season he ended the campaign with 14 Serie A goals. He spent much of the year as captain of Lazio, deputizing for the often injured Luciano Zauri. On 20 February 2008, Rocchi renewed his contract, extending the deal by five years. This contract extension would run until 2013, and effectively ensure Rocchi would remain at the club for the remainder of his career. On 19 March 2008, Rocchi scored his fourth goal in the Derby della Capitale in a 3–2 victory against AS Roma.

From a personal perspective, 2008–09 was a poor season for Rocchi. After missing the first two months of the season due to an injury suffered while on international duty at the 2008 Beijing Games, Rocchi never reached his usual goalscoring form, finishing with just 9 for the season; his lowest tally in six years. However, the club won their fifth Coppa Italia title, defeating Sampdoria in a penalty shootout. Rocchi suffered the indignity of being the only Lazio player to fail to convert his spot kick, however he did go on to score the winning goal in the Italian Super Cup final against Inter Milan. This season was also his first as the official team captain, after the departure of Zauri to Fiorentina.

At the end of the 2008–09 season, having made over 200 appearances in the Lazio shirt, and having scored 83 goals, Rocchi declared his target was to join an exclusive list of players to have scored 100 goals for the club. This mark had only previously been reached by four players, Silvio Piola, Giuseppe Signori, Bruno Giordano and Giorgio Chinaglia. Rocchi decided to change his number 18 shirt for the number 9, which had previously been worn by all of those four, aside from Signori.

=== Inter Milan ===
On 4 January 2013, after spending nine years at Lazio, Rocchi joined Inter Milan by signing a contract until the end of the 2012–13. His new side paid a fee of €300,000 to the Roman side. He was presented to the media three days later and was handed squad number 18.

He scored his first goal for Inter on 7 April 2013 against Atalanta at home in an eventual in a 4–3 loss. Ten days later, Rocchi give his first assist, a backheel assist for Jonathan, in the returning leg of 2012–13 Coppa Italia semi-final tie against Roma which ended in a 2–3 home defeat. On 21 April, Rocchi scored his second goal of the season, the winner against Parma.

== International career ==
Rocchi has represented Italy at youth level several times.

In August 2006, following Italy's fourth FIFA World Cup title, new Azzurri boss Roberto Donadoni called Rocchi up to the squad as a reward for his exceptional scoring record in Serie A.

He made his debut against Croatia in the 2–0 loss at 29 years of age. Rocchi played two more matches for the national team on the road to Euro 2008 but did not make the squad for the final tournament.

He was selected as the only overage player in Pierluigi Casiraghi's Olympic team to play at the 2008 Beijing Olympic Games. He scored on his debut against South Korea on 10 August, contributing in a 3–0 win which helped Italy to finish top in the Group D. However, he picked up an injury during the match, a fracture in fibula, which forced him to abandon the tournament. He was replaced by Antonio Candreva.

== Career statistics ==
=== Club ===
Appearances and goals by club, season and competition
Club	Season	League			National cup (Note: Includes Coppa Italia, Magyar Kupa)		Europe		Other		Total	
Club	Season	Division	Apps	Goals	Apps	Goals	Apps	Goals	Apps	Goals	Apps	Goals
Juventus	1995–96	Serie A	0	0	0	0	0	0	0	0	0	0
Pro Patria (loan)	1996–97	Serie C2	27	6	0	0	—		—		27	6
Fermana (loan)	1997–98	Serie C1	4	0	0	0	—		—		4	0
Saronno (loan)	1997–98	Serie C1	28	10	0	0	—		—		28	10
Como	1998–99	Serie C1	34	12	0	0	—		—		34	12
Como	1999–2000	Serie C1	30	9	5	4	—		—		35	13
Como	Total		64	21	5	4	—		—		69	25
Treviso	2000–01	Serie B	37	8	1	0	—		—		38	8
Empoli	2001–02	Serie B	37	11	4	1	—		—		41	12
Empoli	2002–03	Serie A	34	6	7	1	—		—		41	7
Empoli	2003–04	Serie A	33	11	2	0	—		—		35	11
Empoli	2004–05	Serie B	0	0	1	0	—		—		1	0
Empoli	Total		104	28	14	2	—		—		118	30
Lazio	2004–05	Serie A	35	13	1	2	5 (Note: Appearances in UEFA Cup)	2	—		41	17
Lazio	2005–06	Serie A	37	16	1	0	3 (Note: Appearances in UEFA Intertoto Cup)	1	—		41	17
Lazio	2006–07	Serie A	36	16	3	3	—		—		39	19
Lazio	2007–08	Serie A	36	14	4	1	8 (Note: Appearances in UEFA Champions League)	4	—		48	19
Lazio	2008–09	Serie A	27	9	5	2	—		—		32	11
Lazio	2009–10	Serie A	32	6	2	1	5 (Note: Appearances in UEFA Europa League)	2	1 (Note: Appearance in Supercoppa Italiana)	1	40	10
Lazio	2010–11	Serie A	18	3	2	0	—		—		20	3
Lazio	2011–12	Serie A	20	5	2	1	7	3	—		20	9
Lazio	2012–13	Serie A	3	0	0	0	0	0	—		3	0
Lazio	Total		244	82	19	9	28	12	1	1	293	105
Inter Milan	2012–13	Serie A	13	3	2	0	0	0	—		15	3
Padova	2013–14	Serie B	20	5	0	0	—		—		20	5
Haladás	2014–15	Nemzeti Bajnokság I	17	3	2	3	—		—		19	6
Tatabánya	2015–16	Nemzeti Bajnokság III	6	2	0	0	—		—		6	2
Career total			664	168	44	19	28	12	1	1	637	200

=== International ===
Appearances and goals by national team and year
National team	Year	Apps	Goals
Italy	2006	2	0
Italy	2007	1	0
Total		3	0

== Honours ==
Lazio

- Coppa Italia: 2008–09
- Supercoppa Italiana: 2009
