= Massimo Mutarelli =

Italian footballer

Personal information
- Full name: Massimo Mutarelli
- Date of birth: January 13, 1978 (age 48)
- Place of birth: Como, Italy
- Height: 1.78 m (5 ft 10 in)
- Position: Midfielder

Youth career
- 1994–1995: Atalanta

Senior career*
Years	Team	Apps	(Gls)
1995–1997	Atalanta	5	(0)
1998–2002	Genoa	138	(8)
2003–2006	Palermo	116	(5)
2006–2008	Lazio	48	(4)
2009–2011	Bologna	33	(1)
2012	Atalanta	13	(0)

International career
1995	Italy U-17	7	(1)
1995–1996	Italy U-18	17	(1)
1998	Italy U-21	1	(0)
- * Club domestic league appearances and goals

Massimo Mutarelli (born 13 January 1978) is an Italian retired football midfielder.

== Career ==
Mutarelli started his career at Serie A club Atalanta, making his debut in April 1996 in a 3–1 loss at home to Lazio.

After four seasons in Bergamo, Mutarelli was sold to Genoa in January 1998. With Genoa, Mutarelli made 138 appearances in Serie B.

In 2002, Mutarelli moved again, this time south to Palermo. He spent two seasons in Serie B with the rosanero, before the club made a glorious return to Serie A in 2004–05. He continued his excellent form in the top flight, and after one season was rewarded with a move to the capital club Lazio, signed a 5-year contract as a free agent.

Mutarelli's first season with the Biancocelesti was a good one, and he capped off a quality first season in Rome, with a goal in the historic 3–0 Derby win over inter-city rivals Roma.

In 2007–08, Mutarelli was hampered by injuries and did not have a season as successful as the last. He made his debut in the UEFA Champions League but was sent off against Werder Bremen.

Involved in a contract dispute after having been frozen out of the Lazio side at the beginning of the 2008–09 season, Mutarelli took his case to court and was freed from his contract. He then joined Bologna in January 2009.
