= Manuel Belleri =

Italian footballer

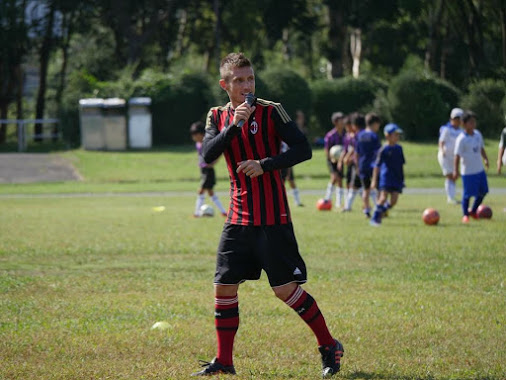
- Belleri as a technical director of Milan Academy Tokyo

Personal information
- Date of birth: 29 August 1977 (age 49)
- Place of birth: Brescia, Italy
- Height: 1.75 m (5 ft 9 in)
- Position: Right back

Team information
- Current team: A.C. Milan Academy Tokyo (as technical director)

Senior career*
Years	Team	Apps	(Gls)
1993–1999	Lumezzane	106	(5)
1999–2004	Empoli	156	(5)
2004–2005	Udinese	22	(0)
2005–2009	Lazio	39	(2)
2007–2008	→ Atalanta (loan)	20	(0)
2009	→ Bologna (loan)	6	(0)
2009–2010	Lecce	19	(0)
2010–2011	SPAL	18	(0)
- * Club domestic league appearances and goals

Manuel Belleri (born 29 August 1977) is an Italian former footballer who played as a defender. Since 2016 he is a technical director of A.C. Milan Academy Tokyo and resides in Tokyo, Japan.

== Football career ==
Belleri started his career at Lumezzane. He played in Serie A for Empoli in the 2002–03 season. When Empoli failed to protect his place in 2004, Belleri, Di Natale and Cribari were sold to Udinese in a co-ownership deal, with Almirón and Nomvethe moving in the opposite direction. Cribari and Belleri were sold to S.S. Lazio the next year. Belleri signed a 4-year contract in another co-ownership deal for €250,000 transfer fee. In June 2006, Belleri, Cribari, Pandev and Mauri were acquired outright from Udinese for €400,000, €3 million, €4 million and €3 million respectively.

In the mid-2007, Belleri was loaned to Atalanta B.C. After the game against A.C. Milan on 25 January 2009, Bologna F.C. 1909 announced the signing of Belleri on loan.

He joined Lecce on 31 August 2009 on a free transfer.

== Post-playing career ==
Belleri obtained the license as a youth team coach in 2013. In the same year Belleri was admitted to the course that teach sport directorship.

In 2015 he was hired by A.C. Milan as one of the 16 trainers (Italian: Tecnici) of A.C. Milan Academy. He was assigned a role that he would be sent to one of the 16 academies that located abroad (13 countries).

In 2016 he moved to Tokyo, Japan as a technical director of A.C. Milan Academy Tokyo.
