= Cristian Ledesma (footballer, born 1982) =

Argentine-born Italian footballer

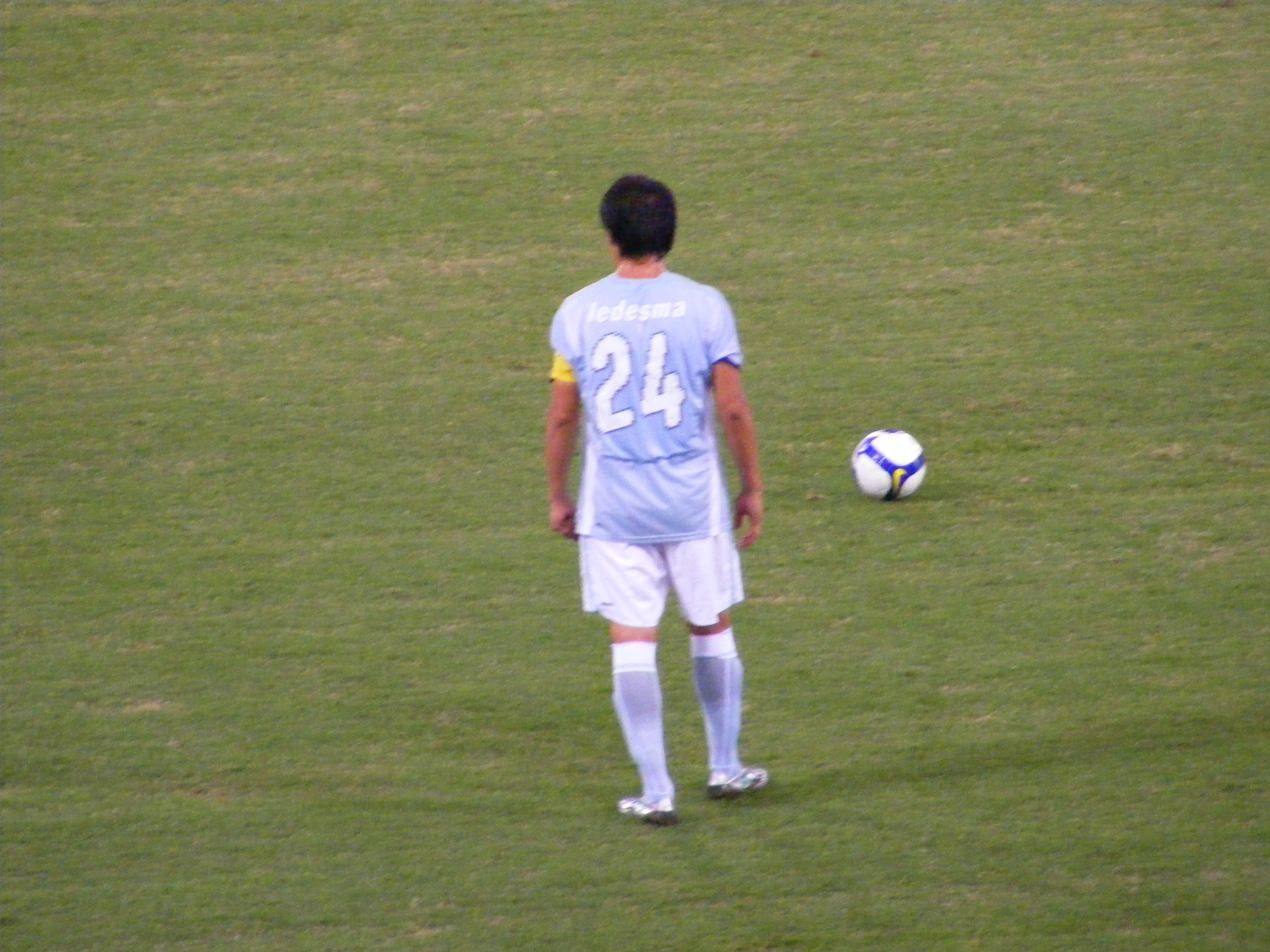
- Ledesma playing for Lazio in 2008

Personal information
- Full name: Cristian Daniel Ledesma
- Date of birth: 24 September 1982 (age 44)
- Place of birth: Morón, Argentina
- Height: 1.80 m (5 ft 11 in)
- Position: Midfielder

Team information
- Current team: Ascoli (Under-19 youth coach)

Youth career
- 1997–2001: Boca Juniors
- 2001–2002: Lecce

Senior career*
Years	Team	Apps	(Gls)
2002–2006	Lecce	126	(4)
2006–2015	Lazio	259	(12)
2015	Santos	4	(0)
2016–2017	Panathinaikos	6	(3)
2017	Ternana	19	(0)
2017–2018	Lugano	20	(0)
2018	Pro Piacenza	14	(0)
Total		448	(19)

International career
2010	Italy	1	(0)

Managerial career
- 2019–2021: LUISS
- 2022: Cimini
- 2024: Ascoli (caretaker)
- * Club domestic league appearances and goals as of 16 December 2018

Cristian Daniel Ledesma (born 24 September 1982) is an Argentine-born Italian retired footballer who played as a central midfielder. He is currently working as the Under-19 coach of Ascoli.

A dual citizen of Argentina and Italy, he appeared with the latter's national team in November 2010.

Ledesma is perhaps best known for his nine years at Italian club Lazio, where he was involved in two Coppa Italia wins. He is a deep lying central midfield playmaker with good vision, passing, and technique; he also possesses a powerful shot with either foot, despite being naturally right-footed, and occasionally scores goals from long range.

== Club career ==
=== Early career ===
Born in Morón, Buenos Aires, Ledesma grew up in Puerto Madryn, in the province of Chubut. He later returned to the capital, joining the youth system of Boca Juniors in 1997 at the age of 14.

In 2001, Ledesma moved to Italy and joined Lecce, whose sporting director Pantaleo Corvino decided to bring him to Salento. Initially assigned to the Primavera squad, he made his first team – and Serie A – debut on 10 March 2002, starting in a 1–2 away loss against Atalanta.

After suffering relegation, Ledesma was promoted to the main squad. He scored his first goal for the club on 1 December 2002, netting the last in a 1–1 Serie B draw at Hellas Verona.

Ledesma appeared in 29 matches during the campaign, as Lecce returned to the top tier at the first attempt. He scored his first goal in the main category on 9 November 2003, netting his team's second in a 2–2 away draw against Perugia.

Ledesma was an ever-present figure for the Giallorossi during the following campaigns, being also captain.

=== Lazio ===
In July 2006, after suffering another relegation, Ledesma signed a four-year deal with Lazio for a €5.3 million fee. He made his debut for the club on 19 August 2006, starting in a 4–0 Coppa Italia home routing of Rende.

During his first season in the capital, Ledesma established himself as a key player despite a difficult start. His first moment of magic came in December 2006 during a Derby della Capitale against historical rivals AS Roma, when he scored a strike from 25 metres out. He continued this good form until the end of the season when Lazio qualified for the UEFA Champions League. He successively served as vice-captain and was a protagonist in Lazio's winning Coppa Italia 2008–09 campaign.

In July 2009, with his contract set to expire the following year, Ledesma was excluded from the first team due to disagreements with club chairman Claudio Lotito and did not play any competitive games during the whole first half of the 2009–10 season. This led the player to formally ask the Lega Calcio arbitration committee for a contract termination due to violation of its terms, only a few weeks after teammate Goran Pandev had taken the same exact action.

This was, however, turned down on 26 January 2010 on the grounds that Ledesma was occasionally involved in first-team activities. After being linked with a move to Internazionale, he ultimately stayed at Lazio and, immediately after the replacement of head coach Davide Ballardini with veteran manager Edoardo Reja, he made his 2009–10 season debut on 14 February, being featured in the starting lineup in a 2–0 win at Parma. Since his return to the pitch, Ledesma immediately established himself back into being a key player for the biancazzurri.

On 23 August 2010, Ledesma signed a new contract with Lazio, extending his link until 2015. In his 2010–11 campaign, he was one of the protagonists of Lazio's surprising start that led the Rome club to even top the Serie A table for a few weeks between October and November. Lazio ended their 2011–12 season campaign qualifying once again for the Europa League and only just missing out on Udinese by a goal difference in a Champions League spot.

On 1 July 2015, Ledesma was released after not having his contract renewed. He appeared in 318 matches and scored 14 goals for Lazio, being honoured by the club after his departure.

=== Santos ===
On 28 August 2015, Ledesma agreed to a contract with Brazilian club Santos. He made his debut for the club on 18 October, coming on as a second-half substitute for Renato in a 3–1 home win against Goiás.

On 6 January 2016, after being rarely used, Ledesma rescinded his contract.

=== Panathinaikos ===
On 14 July 2016, Panathinaikos officially announced the transfer of Argentinian midfielder. The 33-year-old centre midfielder, who played for Santos last season, has signed a two-year contract with the Greens for an undisclosed fee. On 18 August 2016, Ledesma along with Marcus Berg was the scorer of goal from the penalty spot, helping Panathinaikos win the first leg of the Europa League playoffs and is set to qualify for the group stage, as the Greens crushed Danish Brøndby IF 3–0 at Leoforos stadium. On 2 October 2016, he scored with two penalty kicks, helping his club to achieve a 3–1 home win against Asteras Tripolis for the 4th day of the 2016–17 season.

On 28 December 2016, as expected, Panathinaikos parted ways with Ledesma. The Greens have officially announced the news, while the 34-year-old midfielder seems to be heading to Italy.

=== Pro Piacenza ===
On 5 September 2018, Ledesma returned to Italy once again for Serie C club Pro Piacenza. Pro Piacenza experienced financial difficulties in late 2018 and all the players were released from contracts.

== International career ==
Ledesma acquired Italian citizenship in 2008 through marriage to an Italian woman he met during his spell at Lecce; this made him eligible at international level for both Argentina and the Italy (Azzurri), as he had never been capped with the Selección before.

On 14 November 2010, Ledesma accepted a call-up by Italy manager Cesare Prandelli for a friendly match against Romania, thus becoming the third oriundo to become part of the Azzurri senior squad in the last ten years, the other two being Mauro Camoranesi and Amauri.

== Coaching career ==
Ledesma confirmed in summer 2019 that he had retired from football and would continue as a coach for the Ledesma Academy, where he should be in charge of training children from 5 to 15 years.

In September 2019 he took over on his first role as a first team manager, coaching Promozione amateurs LUISS, the football branch of the Libera Università Internazionale degli Studi Sociali Guido Carli. He left the club in October 2021, overseeing a promotion to Eccellenza. In March 2022 he was named new head coach of Eccellenza amateur side Cimini.

In July 2022, Ledesma joined Frosinone as a youth coach in charge of the Under-17 team.

On 27 September 2024, Ledesma was appointed interim head coach of Serie C club Ascoli, a club for which he was working as youth coach in charge of the Under-19 team. He returned to work for the Under-19 team after only one game, a 0–1 loss to Rimini.

== Career statistics ==
=== Club ===
Club	Season	League			Cup		Continental		Other		Total	
Club	Season	Division	Apps	Goals	Apps	Goals	Apps	Goals	Apps	Goals	Apps	Goals
Lecce	2001–02	Serie A	1	0	1	0	—		—		2	0
Lecce	2002–03	Serie B	29	1	1	0	—		—		30	1
Lecce	2003–04	Serie A	30	1	1	0	—		—		31	1
Lecce	2004–05	Serie A	33	0	4	2	—		—		37	2
Lecce	2005–06	Serie A	33	2	1	0	—		—		34	2
Lecce	Total		126	4	8	2	—		—		134	6
Lazio	2006–07	Serie A	33	2	3	0	—		—		36	2
Lazio	2007–08	Serie A	32	3	4	0	7 (Note: All appearance(s) in UEFA Champions League)	0	—		43	3
Lazio	2008–09	Serie A	34	2	7	1	—		—		41	3
Lazio	2009–10	Serie A	13	0	0	0	0	0	0	0	13	0
Lazio	2010–11	Serie A	34	1	2	0	—		—		36	1
Lazio	2011–12	Serie A	37	3	2	0	8 (Note: All appearance(s) in UEFA Europa League)	0	—		47	3
Lazio	2012–13	Serie A	36	1	5	0	11	0	—		52	1
Lazio	2013–14	Serie A	27	0	1	0	5	0	1 (Note: All appearance(s) in Supercoppa Italiana)	0	34	0
Lazio	2014–15	Serie A	13	0	3	1	—		—		16	1
Lazio	Total		259	12	27	2	31	0	1	0	318	14
Santos	2015	Série A	4	0	0	0	—		0	0	4	0
Santos	Total		4	0	0	0	—		0	0	4	0
Panathinaikos	2016–17	Super League Greece	6	3	1	0	8	1	0	0	15	4
Ternana	2016–17	Serie B	19	0	—		—		—		19	0
Lugano	2017–18	Swiss Super League	20	0	2	0	4	0	—		26	0
Pro Piacenza	2018–19	Serie C	14	0	—		—		—		14	0
Career total			448	19	38	4	43	1	1	0	530	24

=== International ===
As of match played 29 August 2015

Italy
Year	Apps	Goals
2010	1	0
Total	1	0

== Honours ==
Lazio

- Coppa Italia: 2008–09, 2012–13
- Supercoppa Italiana: 2009
