= Emílson Cribari =

Brazilian footballer (born 1980)

Personal information
- Full name: Emílson Sánchez Cribari
- Date of birth: 6 March 1980 (age 46)
- Place of birth: Cambará, Brazil
- Height: 1.90 m (6 ft 3 in)
- Position: Centre back

Senior career*
Years	Team	Apps	(Gls)
1996–1998	Londrina	21	(0)
1998–2004	Empoli	103	(3)
2004–2006	Udinese	8	(0)
2006–2010	Lazio	109	(1)
2010	→ Siena (loan)	18	(0)
2010–2011	Napoli	9	(0)
2011–2012	Cruzeiro	5	(0)
2012–2014	Rangers	33	(0)
Total		306	(4)
Medal record
Lazio
Winner	Supercoppa Italiana	2009
Rangers
Winner	Scottish Third Division	2013
- * Club domestic league appearances and goals

Emílson Sánchez Cribari (born 6 March 1980) is a Brazilian former footballer who played as a centre back.

== Career ==
Cribari started his career in his home state of Paraná, with Londrina Esporte Clube. From Londrina, he moved to Italy where he began his Serie A career with Empoli and Udinese.

Cribari was signed by Udinese along with Antonio Di Natale and Manuel Belleri. Cribari joined Lazio in 2005 from Udinese in temporary deal. In 2006, Lazio signed him outright for €3 million. In his first two seasons, he established himself as a regular in the Biancoceleste defence, and gained a reputation as a quality and uncompromising player. Cribari was a key man in Lazio's successful season in 2006–07, when they achieved a third-place finish to qualify for the Champions League.

He fractured his jaw and cheekbone in Lazio's UEFA Champions League clash with Dinamo Bucharest and was initially ruled out for over two months, but managed to return for Lazio's second leg win only two weeks later. However, his recent form since returning from the injury has been poor, and not of the high standards he set during his first seasons at the club. In January 2010, AC Siena signed the Brazilian central defender from SS Lazio until the end of the season 2009/2010. In the first match for Siena, he got a red card.

On 31 August 2010, Cribari signed a deal with S.S.C. Napoli, leaving Lazio for €500,000. On 8 July 2011, after his contract with Napoli expired, Cribari agreed a one-year deal with Brazilian club Cruzeiro.

Cribari trained with Rangers with a view to signing on 6 August 2012. The next day it was confirmed he had agreed terms with the club, penning a two-year deal with the option of a third. Emilson stated "The club is famous in my country because it has such a strong history so it was an easy decision for me. Rangers are without doubt the greatest club in Scottish Football, look at their list of honours". Cribari made his Rangers debut on 18 August 2012, as a substitute at home to East Stirlingshire. Cribari went on to help Rangers win the Third Division league title on 30 March 2013. His appearances the following season were limited to single figures and Cribari left the club upon the expiration of his contract.

== Honours ==
Lazio

- Supercoppa Italiana: 1 (2009)

Rangers

- Scottish Third Division: 1 (2013)
- Scottish League One: 1 (2014)
