= Delio Rossi =

Italian football manager (born 1960)

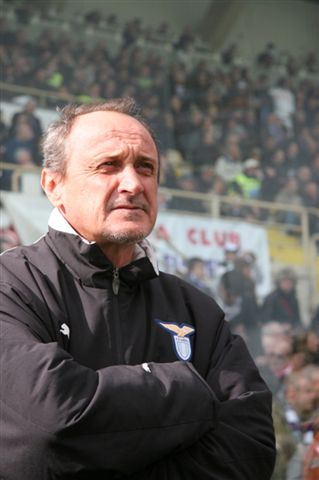
- Rossi with Lazio in 2008

Personal information
- Date of birth: 26 January 1960 (age 66)
- Place of birth: Rimini, Italy
- Position: Midfielder

Senior career*
Years	Team	Apps	(Gls)
1978–1980	Forlimpopoli	54	(2)
1980–1981	Cattolica	29	(3)
1981–1987	Foggia	127	(3)
1987–1988	Vis Pesaro	22	(0)
1988–1989	Fidelis Andria	15	(0)
Total		247	(8)

Managerial career
- 1990–1991: Torremaggiore
- 1993–1995: Salernitana
- 1995–1996: Foggia
- 1996–1997: Pescara
- 1997–1999: Salernitana
- 1999–2000: Genoa
- 2000: Pescara
- 2001: Pescara
- 2002–2004: Lecce
- 2004–2005: Atalanta
- 2005–2009: Lazio
- 2009–2011: Palermo
- 2011: Palermo
- 2011–2012: Fiorentina
- 2012–2013: Sampdoria
- 2015: Bologna
- 2017–2018: Levski Sofia
- 2019: Palermo
- 2020: Ascoli
- 2023: Foggia
- 2025: Foggia
- * Club domestic league appearances and goals

Delio Rossi (born 26 January 1960) is an Italian football manager and former player.

== Playing career ==
Rossi was born in Rimini. A midfielder, his playing career was not a bright one, as he reached his top from 1981 to 1983, playing in the Serie B with Foggia, where he spent most of his footballing time. He retired in 1989 after a season with Fidelis Andria in Serie C2.

== Managerial career ==
=== Early years and Serie A debut with Salernitana ===
Rossi, a sports science graduate with honours, took his first coaching job in 1990, aged 29, at Torremaggiore in the Promozione league, and immediately won the championship. The following year, he joined Foggia as youth coach. In 1993, Rossi signed for Salernitana of Serie C1, and led the team to a Serie B promotion. After an unlucky comeback to Foggia, and a sixth place in Pescara, Rossi returned to coach Salernitana in 1997, leading the team to its second Serie A promotion in history. Rossi guided the team in Serie A as well, but was fired in March 1999 after failing to keep Salernitana out of the relegation zone.

=== Minor teams in Serie A and Serie B ===
A troubled year in Genoa and a poor comeback to Pescara were followed by three seasons with Lecce. Rossi, appointed as Lecce's coach in February 2002, was unable to avoid relegation to Serie B, but led the team back to Serie A the following season and maintained a place in the division the following year. He left Lecce in 2004 to be replaced by his maestro Zděnek Zeman, who was head coach at Foggia during Rossi's time in leading its youth team.

In December 2004, Rossi replaced Andrea Mandorlini at the helm of Atalanta, last-placed in Serie A. Despite all his efforts and numerous praises, Rossi was unable to help his team escape relegation.

=== Lazio ===
Despite not saving Atalanta, his efforts at the helm of the Dea club gained interest from Lazio, who appointed him as a replacement for Giuseppe Papadopulo.

His time at Lazio was a remarkable success, attracting interest from many top Serie A clubs. Rossi guided Lazio to a surprising UEFA Cup place in the 2005–2006 season, only for the place to be lost as part of the Calciopoli scandal that rocked the country in the summer of 2006. Even more remarkable, however, was Rossi's feat the following season. Despite an initial 11-point deduction (which was subsequently reduced to 3 on appeal), Rossi guided the biancocelesti to an unlikely third-place Serie A finish and a place in the 2007–08 UEFA Champions League. However, during the 2007–08 season, he led Lazio to a disappointing 12th-place finish.

On 13 May 2009, Rossi led Lazio to their first trophy since the Coppa Italia triumph in 2004. It was also a Coppa Italia victory, which came after a successful penalty shootout against Sampdoria. On 8 June 2009, Delio Rossi was announced to have left Lazio due to personal reasons, allegedly linked to an unstable working relationship with the chairman Claudio Lotito. He was replaced by Davide Ballardini.

=== Palermo ===
On 23 November 2009, Rossi returned into management as new head coach of Palermo, replacing Walter Zenga at the helm of the rosanero. He immediately managed to turn the fortunes of Palermo, guiding the Sicilians to quickly rise up the Serie A league table also thanks to surprise results such as two 2–0 away win against teams such as AC Milan and Juventus, and ending the season in fifth place with only one point behind fourth-placed Sampdoria who were admitted to the UEFA Champions League third qualifying round at the rosanero's expense. He was consequently confirmed as head coach of Palermo for the 2010–11 season, during which he also guided the club in its 2010–11 UEFA Europa League campaign. Impressive results in the new season included another remarkable win at Juventus' home, as well as his ability to launch the careers of youngsters such as Javier Pastore, Ezequiel Muñoz, Josip Iličić, and Armin Bačinović.

Rossi was sacked on 28 February 2011 by club president Maurizio Zamparini following a record 7–0 home loss to Udinese; he was replaced by Serse Cosmi. However, Rossi returned at Palermo only four weeks later, after Cosmi's Palermo side was soundly defeated by Catania in the Sicilian derby later on 3 April. Following a surprising comeback, he led the club to the Coppa Italia final, which Palermo lost 3–1 to Inter Milan. During the pre-season, on 1 June 2011, Rossi resigned as Palermo manager by mutual consent with president Zamparini.

=== Fiorentina ===
On 7 November 2011, Rossi returned to management as the new head coach of Serie A club Fiorentina, replacing Siniša Mihajlović, who had been dismissed due to poor results. Rossi's debut match as Fiorentina boss ended in a 0–0 home draw against incumbent champions Milan. Afterwards, Fiorentina lost 2–0 to Delio's former club Palermo. He later beat Empoli 2–1 in the Coppa Italia. In the following weeks, he put Fiorentina up to 10th place in Serie A after they beat Roma 3–0. The following games, however, saw Fiorentina drop down the table to 17th place at some point, and thus were involved in the fight to escape relegation.

Rossi's time with Fiorentina came to a shocking end. On 2 May 2012, during a home game against 19th-placed Novara, Rossi substituted Serbian striker Adem Ljajić in the 32nd minute, with Fiorentina losing 2–0. The player sarcastically applauded the substitution as he left the pitch and, from the dugout, gave the coach a sarcastic thumbs-up, to which Rossi reacted by physically assaulting Ljajić, pushing the youngster from above, then jumping after him into the dugout while attempting to punch him. Claims that Ljajić had insulted Rossi's family were found to be false after several other players and staff who were present denied hearing Ljajić use any derogatory language. After the game (which ended in a 2–2 draw), the club board announced that Rossi had been immediately removed from his position due to his actions, with two games still to go in the league season. The incident also cost him a three-month ban from Italian football, effective from 3 May 2012.

=== Sampdoria ===
Rossi was appointed head coach of Sampdoria in December 2012, succeeding Ciro Ferrara, becoming the seventh coach to have worked with both Genoa and Sampdoria. During his coaching tenure with the club, Rossi helped the Blucerchiati avoid relegation at the end of the 2012–13 Serie A season. On 11 November 2013, Rossi was sacked from his post, with Sampdoria in 18th position in the Serie A table, having earned just nine points and won only twice in 12 Serie A matches during the 2013–14 Serie A season. Sampdoria had lost its last three Serie A matches, including a 2–1 defeat at Fiorentina on the day of Rossi's dismissal. Rossi hinted after the Fiorentina defeat that 'trust' between himself and the club was becoming an issue. "If there is a time when you do not feel that the trust is there, you should not wait to see how things unfold. I am a man of the world and I think that if the confidence is there, then it is normal that one continues, but if it is not, then it is better to end the rapport regardless of the results", he said.

=== Bologna ===
On 4 May 2015, Rossi was named the new manager of Bologna in Serie B replacing Diego López. He guided Bologna to win the promotion playoffs, defeating Pescara in the finals, and was confirmed for the club's successive Serie A campaign.

He was sacked by Bologna on 28 October 2015, after a string of negative results.

=== Levski ===
On 4 August 2017, Rossi was announced as the new head coach of Bulgarian club Levski Sofia. He was presented at a press conference a few days later, on 8 August 2017. After a string of 6 matches without victory, losing the final of the Bulgarian Cup and also a shock exit from Europa League at the hands of Vaduz, Rossi was released from his duties on 25 July 2018.

=== Return to Palermo ===
On 24 April 2019, he was appointed Palermo manager, on what was his second stint at the head of the Rosanero. After failing to win automatic promotion to Lecce in his four games in charge, Palermo was subsequently excluded from the subsequent promotion playoffs due to financial irregularities, and he was later not confirmed by the new ownership.

=== Ascoli ===
On 29 November 2020, he was named new head coach of Serie B club Ascoli. He was however sacked only less than a month later, on 22 December, after having achieved only one point in six games in charge.

=== Return to Foggia ===
On 30 March 2023, after three years out of football, Rossi was appointed new head coach of Foggia in the Italian Serie C league on a contract until 30 June 2024, thus marking his return with the Satanelli after 27 years.

After guiding Foggia to a surprise spot in the promotion playoff finals and then losing to Lecco, Rossi announced his intention to leave Foggia with immediate effect.

On 19 July 2025, Rossi agreed to return to Foggia for a third time, signing a one-year contract with the Satanelli. On 6 November 2025, after a negative start to the 2025–26 Serie C season, Rossi departed from Foggia by mutual consent.

== Managerial statistics ==
As of 22 December 2020

Managerial record by team and tenure
Team	From	To	Record							
Team	From	To	G	W	D	L	GF	GA	GD	Win %
Torremaggiore	1 July 1990	30 June 1991	30	12	10	8	32	27	+5	40.00
Salernitana	6 June 1993	30 June 1995	85	39	33	13	129	74	+55	45.88
Foggia	30 June 1995	5 March 1996	31	8	10	13	23	34	−11	25.81
Pescara	1 July 1996	17 June 1997	41	16	12	13	55	41	+14	39.02
Salernitana	20 June 1997	22 March 1999	68	25	22	21	92	82	+10	36.76
Genoa	16 June 1999	14 February 2000	30	10	7	13	39	39	+0	33.33
Pescara	20 June 2000	3 November 2000	12	1	6	5	15	20	−5	8.33
Pescara	18 February 2001	12 June 2001	15	2	3	10	14	25	−11	13.33
Lecce	28 January 2002	22 May 2004	92	29	31	32	110	127	−17	31.52
Atalanta	6 December 2004	30 May 2005	27	8	5	14	26	31	−5	29.63
Lazio	10 June 2005	8 June 2009	184	74	54	56	261	223	+38	40.22
Palermo	23 November 2009	28 February 2011	64	31	12	21	103	89	+14	48.44
Palermo	3 April 2011	1 June 2011	10	5	2	3	18	19	−1	50.00
Fiorentina	7 November 2011	2 May 2012	28	8	9	11	28	38	−10	28.57
Sampdoria	17 December 2012	11 November 2013	34	9	10	15	38	47	−9	26.47
Bologna	4 May 2015	28 October 2015	18	4	4	10	13	22	−9	22.22
Levski Sofia	8 August 2017	19 July 2018	42	23	11	8	68	31	+37	54.76
Palermo	24 April 2019	5 June 2019	4	1	3	0	8	7	+1	25.00
Ascoli	29 November 2020	22 December 2020	6	0	1	5	5	14	−9	0.00
Total			821	305	245	271	1,077	990	+87	37.15

== Honours ==
=== Manager ===
Lazio

- Coppa Italia: 2008–09

Palermo

- Coppa Italia: 2010–11 runners-up

Levski Sofia

- Bulgarian Cup: 2017–18 runners-up
