= Claudio Lotito =

Italian entrepreneur (born 1957)

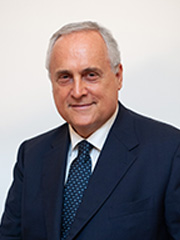
- Lotito in 2022.

Member of the Senate
- Incumbent
- Assumed office 13 October 2022
- Constituency: Molise

Personal details
- Born: 9 May 1957 (age 69) Rome, Italy
- Party: Forza Italia
- Height: 1.74 m (5 ft 9 in)
- Education: Sapienza University of Rome
- Profession: Entrepreneur

Claudio Lotito (born 9 May 1957) is an Italian entrepreneur and politician. He is the owner and president of the Serie A football club Lazio since 2004, and the new owner and president of the Serie D football club AS Reggina 1914 since 2026.

== Education ==
Lotito earned his high school diploma in Classics at Ugo Foscolo Classical Lyceum in Albano Laziale and a Bachelor of Arts in pedagogy cum laude from the University of Rome I "La Sapienza".

== Biography ==
Lotito was banned from football for two and a half years in July 2006 for his involvement in the 2006 Italian football scandal. Lotito got banned again for ten months due to third-party ownership of Mauro Zárate and Julio Ricardo Cruz. However, it was shortened to two months after the appeal. In 2018, he was second on the electoral list for the Senate in the Caserta-Avellino-Benevento district, close to Naples, for the coalition around Silvio Berlusconi In March 2021, he was banned from football for two months due to Lazio breaching COVID-19 protocols.
