= 2009–10 SS Lazio season =

Lazio
2009–10 season
- Owner: Claudio Lotito
- Chairman: Claudio Lotito
- Manager: Edoardo Reja
- Serie A: 12th
- Coppa Italia: Round of 16
- Europa League: Group stage
- Supercoppa Italiana: Winners
- Top goalscorer: League: Sergio Floccari (8 goals); All: Sergio Floccari (8 goals)
- Highest home attendance: 60,000 vs Juventus (12 September 2009)
- Lowest home attendance: 18,000 vs Elfsborg (20 August 2009)
- Average home league attendance: 29,222
Home colours	Away colours	Third colours

The 2009–10 SS Lazio season was the club's 110th season in their history and their 22nd consecutive season in the top-flight of Italian football. After having won their fifth Coppa Italia the previous season, manager Delio Rossi opted to leave and was replaced by Davide Ballardini, the former manager of Palermo. In his first competitive match, Ballardini led the club to victory in the 2009 Supercoppa Italiana against Internazionale at the Beijing National Stadium.

== Pre-season and friendlies ==
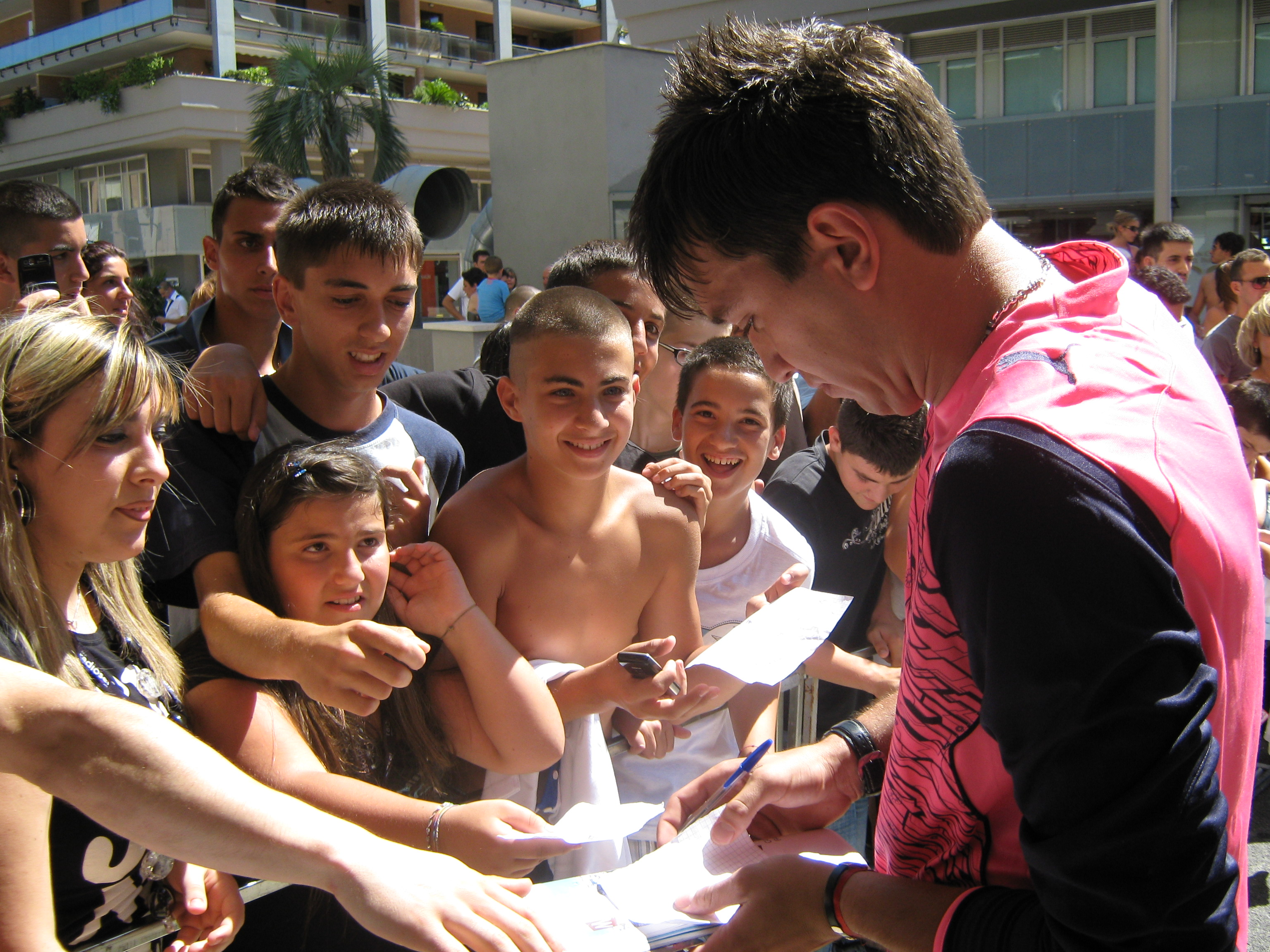
Fernando Muslera signing autographs during the kits' presentation in Fiumicino.

As the previous year, Lazio played their 2009 pre-season matches at the Auronzo di Cadore in Veneto, where they stayed from 10 July to 30 July 2009. Prior to leaving, the kits for the 2009–10 season were presented: produced by Puma, they were shown for the first time at the "Lazio Style" store in Fiumicino on 8 July. At the ceremony, new manager Davide Ballardini and players Tommaso Rocchi, Modibo Diakité and Fernando Muslera were present.

Two days later, the 32-man squad arrived at Auronzo, where they started training under Ballardini, the new manager who replaced Delio Rossi in June, who left Lazio after four years. The first friendly match was played against the local side of Auronzo di Cadore on 12 July: Lazio won 10–0 easily. The next week, Romanian club Universitatea Craiova arrived in Auronzo to play Lazio in another friendly. This time, Lazio drew the match: after Lionel Scaloni scored at the 60th minute, a Michael Baird header locked the match at 1–1.

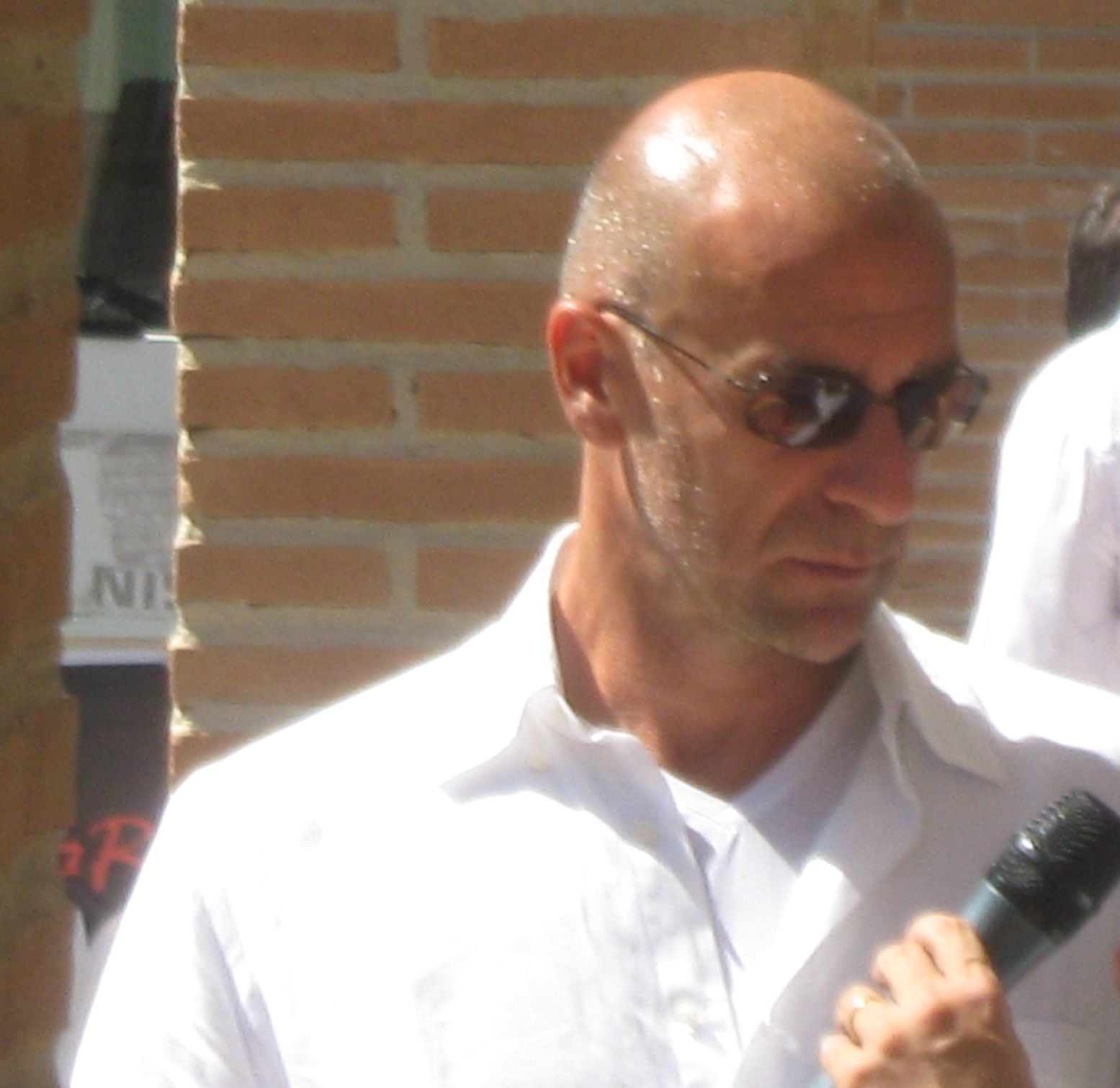
Davide Ballardini was appointed new manager on 15 June 2009.

On 22 July, Lazio played against Lega Pro team SPAL 1907: the match was determined in the second half, with Mauro Zárate and Goran Pandev scoring and making the final Martinucci's goal vane. The final match at Auronzo was played against Serie B team Triestina; in this match, Lazio had a difficult start, with Testini and Luigi Della Rocca scoring two goals for Triestina in the first half. However, the Biancocelesti saved the match thanks to Zárate and Eliseu, who in the second half evened up the score.

After leaving Auronzo, Lazio travelled to China on 2 August in the offing of the Supercoppa Italiana match against Internazionale on 8 August. They stayed in Beijing for seven days and, after winning the game, came back to Rome on 9 August via the Fiumicino Airport, where they were greeted by over 2,000 fans, all celebrating the conquest of the trophy. Lazio played their last friendly match of the pre-season against CA Osasuna at the Stadio Olimpico. Before the game started, the players celebrated in front of the Curva Nord the victory of the last two trophies (Coppa Italia and Supercoppa), with Tommaso Rocchi and Fernando Muslera showing them to the fans. After that, the game started and Osasuna went ahead with a Juanfran goal after 22 minutes, who beat Albano Bizzarri right in front of the goal. Approximately 15 minutes later, Zárate equalized after a Cristian Brocchi cross. No goals were scored after this and the match was determined in the penalty shootout; Lazio won 5–4, with Baronio scoring the last penalty.

12 July 2009	Auronzo di Cadore	0–10	Lazio	Auronzo di Cadore
18:00 CEST		Report	Rocchi 11', 13'; Mauri 12', 20'; Pandev 25', 70', 72'; Inzaghi 26'; Kolarov 39'; Firmani 47'	Referee: Christian Vaccher

18 July 2009	Lazio	1–1	Universitatea Craiova	Auronzo di Cadore
18:00 CEST	Scaloni 60'	Report	Baird 76'	Referee: Gabriele Gava

22 July 2009	Lazio	2–1	SPAL	Auronzo di Cadore
18:00 CEST	Zárate 52'; Pandev 81'	Report	Martucci 87'	Referee: Matteo Bergher

26 July 2009	Lazio	2–2	Triestina	Auronzo di Cadore
18:00 CEST	Zárate 66'; Eliseu 86'	Report	Testini 4'; Della Rocca 26'	Referee: Dino Tommasi

13 August 2009	Lazio	1–1 (4–3 p)	Osasuna	Rome, Italy
21:00 CEST	Zárate 36'	Report	Juanfran 23'	Stadium: Stadio Olimpico; Attendance: 15,000; Referee: Matteo Trefoloni
	Penalties
	Lichtsteiner (penalty scored); Zárate (penalty missed); Dabo (penalty scored); Radu (penalty missed); Meghni (penalty scored); Baronio (penalty scored)		(penalty scored) Puñal; (penalty scored) Juanfran; (penalty scored) Pandiani; (penalty missed) Galán; (penalty missed) Dady; (penalty missed) Vadócz

== Supercoppa Italiana ==
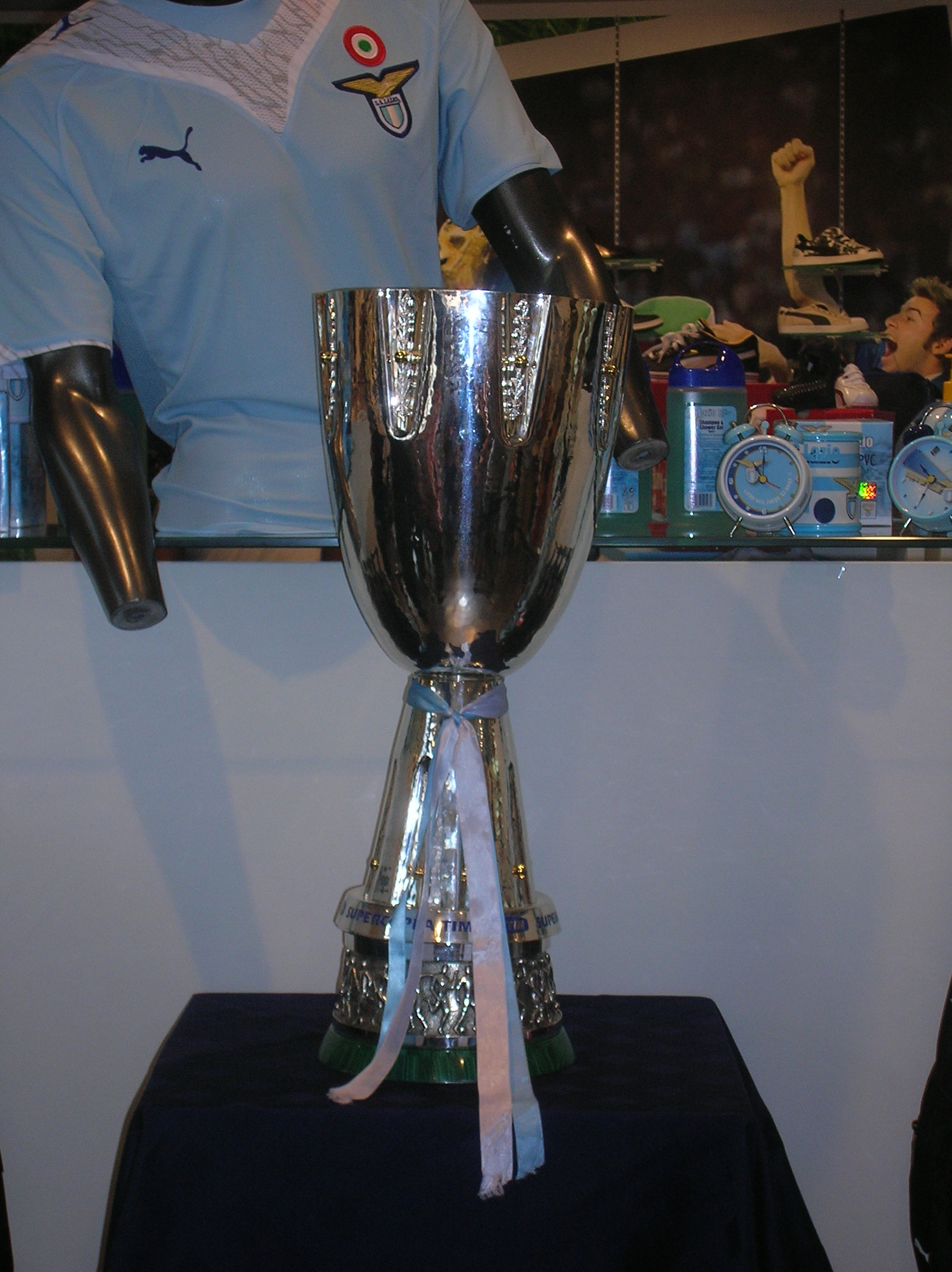
The Supercoppa Italiana trophy on display in a Lazio Style 1900.

As the 2008–09 Coppa Italia winners, Lazio kicked off the 2009–10 season with the traditional annual curtain-raiser, the 2009 Supercoppa Italiana. The match was played against 2008–09 Serie A winners Internazionale on 8 August at the Beijing National Stadium, exactly one year after the 2008 Summer Olympics opening ceremony.

Lazio opened the scoring by a Matuzalém goal in the 62nd minute, who converted on his own rebound after his shot had been saved by Inter goalkeeper Júlio César. Just five minutes later, Lazio captain Tommaso Rocchi, assisted by Stefano Mauri, scored the second goal by lob in front of Júlio César. Samuel Eto'o scored for Inter by a powerful shot inside the area in the 77th minute, but Lazio defended well and Inter was not able to equalize. The win ensured Tommaso Rocchi could thus lift the Supercoppa Italiana trophy that Lazio won for the third time in their history, and the first one during Claudio Lotito's chairmanship.

8 August 2009	Internazionale	1–2	Lazio	Beijing, China
20:30 CST (UTC+08:00)	Muntari (yellow card) 29'; Eto'o 77'; Maicon (yellow card) 89'; Chivu (yellow card) 89'	Report	Matuzalém (yellow card) 30', (goal) 63'; Rocchi 66'	Stadium: Beijing National Stadium; Attendance: 68,961; Referee: Emidio Morganti

== Serie A ==
The 2009–10 Serie A fixtures were released on 29 July 2009, with Lazio due to open their campaign against Atalanta. This match, as well as the next one, was played at 20:45 due to Lega Calcio's decision to play the first two-round on night because of the summer heat.

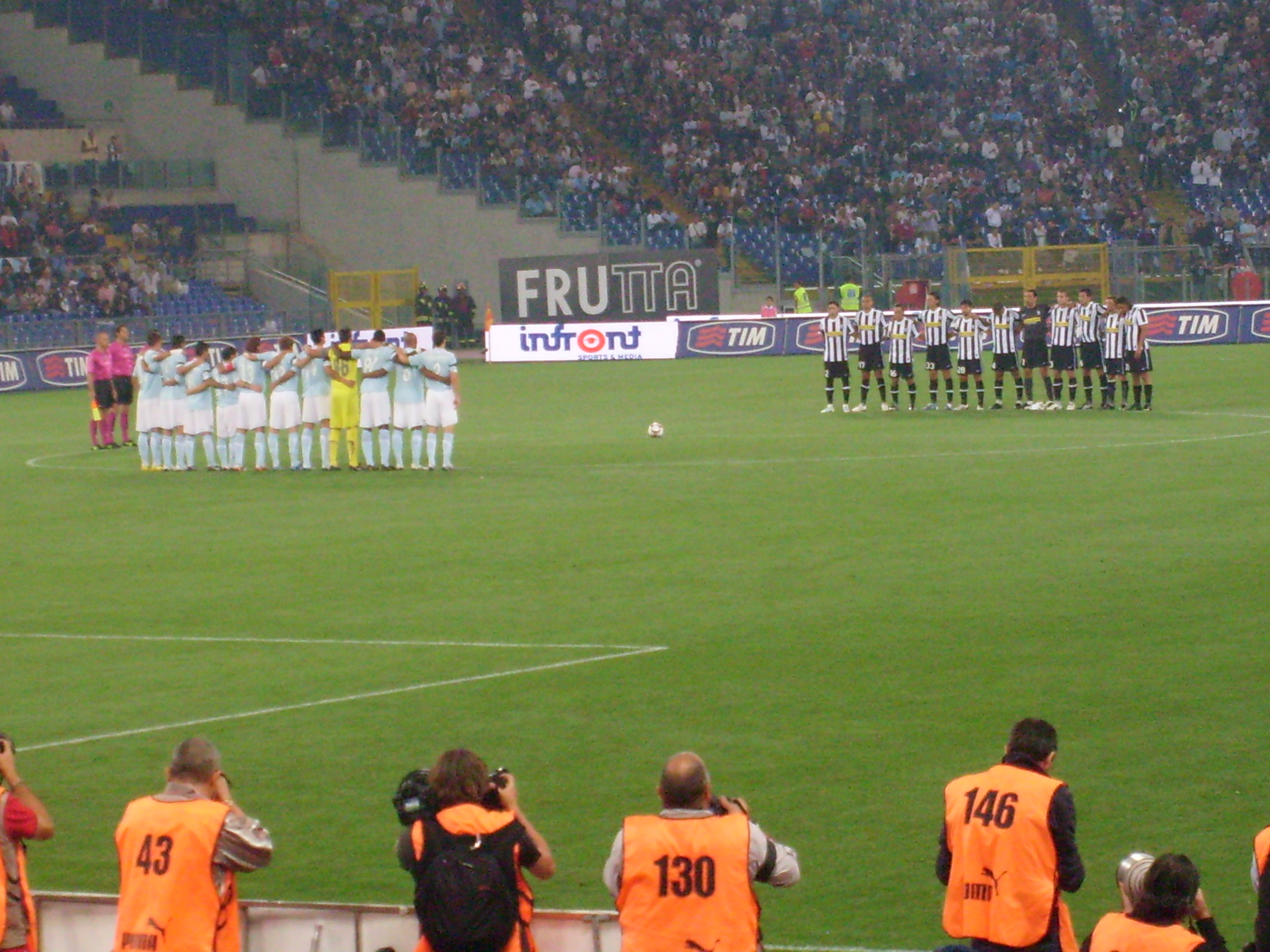
Lazio and Juventus starting teams observing a moment of silence in memory of Alessandro Capponi and Nicola Lo Buono on 12 September 2009.

As the previous year, Lazio opened with a victory. Tommaso Rocchi, assisted at the 22nd minute by Pasquale Foggia, who with a long pass put him alone in front of Consigli, waited until the very last moment and placed the ball with cold shoulder. As the match went on, Lazio and Atalanta shared the ball possession and the goal occasions, and Lazio could thus conquest the first three points of the league.

After the Europa League match against Elfsborg played on 27 August at Borås, the Biancocelesti didn't come back to Rome but flew directly to Verona on 28 August to prepare the Serie A second turn against Chievo two days later. As the last match at the Stadio Bentegodi between the two teams, Sergio Pellissier opened the scoring in the first time by a header, after a Michele Marcolini's corner had been deviate by Nicolas Frey. But at the end of the first half, Santiago Morero artlessly held back Julio Cruz in the penalty area: the referee decided for the penalty, that the same Cruz scored marking in this way his first goal at Lazio. At the 51st minute, Mauro Zárate tried a shot from outside the area that Sorrentino beat back inexpertly, allowing to Cruz to score his second goal at free net. Despite Emílson Cribari being sent off six minutes later due to his second yellow card, Lazio managed to win the match and to stay at the top flight with Sampdoria, Juventus and Genoa.

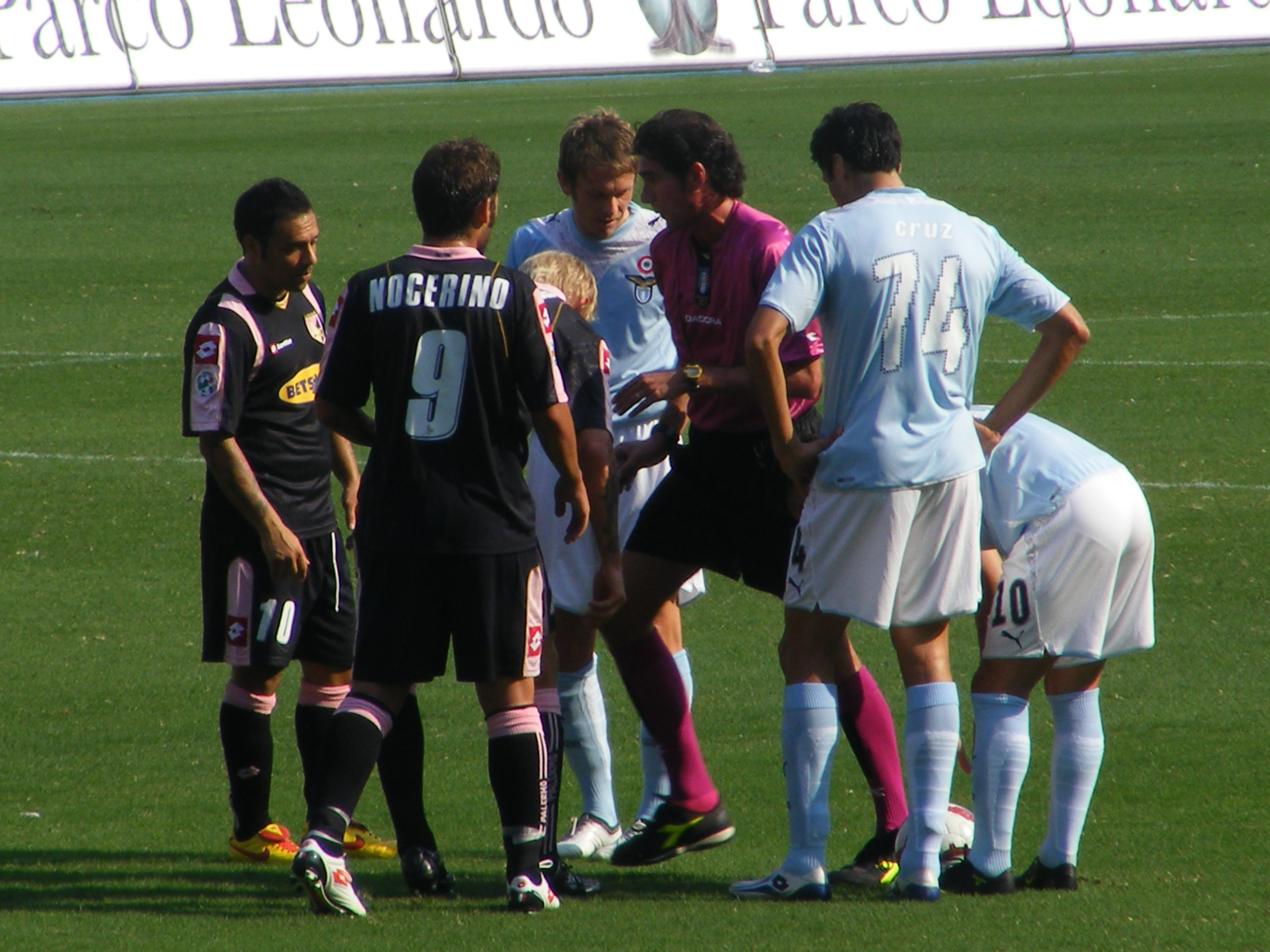
Lazio and Palermo teams arguing with the referee on 27 September 2009.

After this game, there was a week off for international duty: in this period, Lazio's players who were not occupied with national teams met Real Zaragoza in a friendly match at La Romareda on 4 September. Two goals in the second half, one by Pasquale Foggia on penalty and the other one by Zárate in the injury time, assured the victory to the Roman team.

Lazio returned to action on 12 September against Juventus at the Stadio Olimpico. The Biancocelesti couldn't line up their regular forwards, Zárate and Rocchi, both of them absent because of injuries. Also, the defender Cribari lost the match due to his red card during the previous game against Chievo. Before the starting whistle, the starting teams observed a moment of silence in memory of Alessandro Capponi and Nicola Lo Buono, two Lazio players who had died in the same week.

Lazio played very well in the first half and also scored with Mauri in the injury time, but the referee Gervasoni disallowed the goal due to a doubtful Cruz's foul. In the second half, Juventus surprisingly took the lead: a Claudio Marchisio's cross hit Trezeguet's back and the ball fell to Martín Cáceres, who at his first game in Serie A beat Muslera with a volley. Lazio looked tired in the last ten minutes, and at the 94th minute Juventus doubled by David Trezeguet after a break-back.

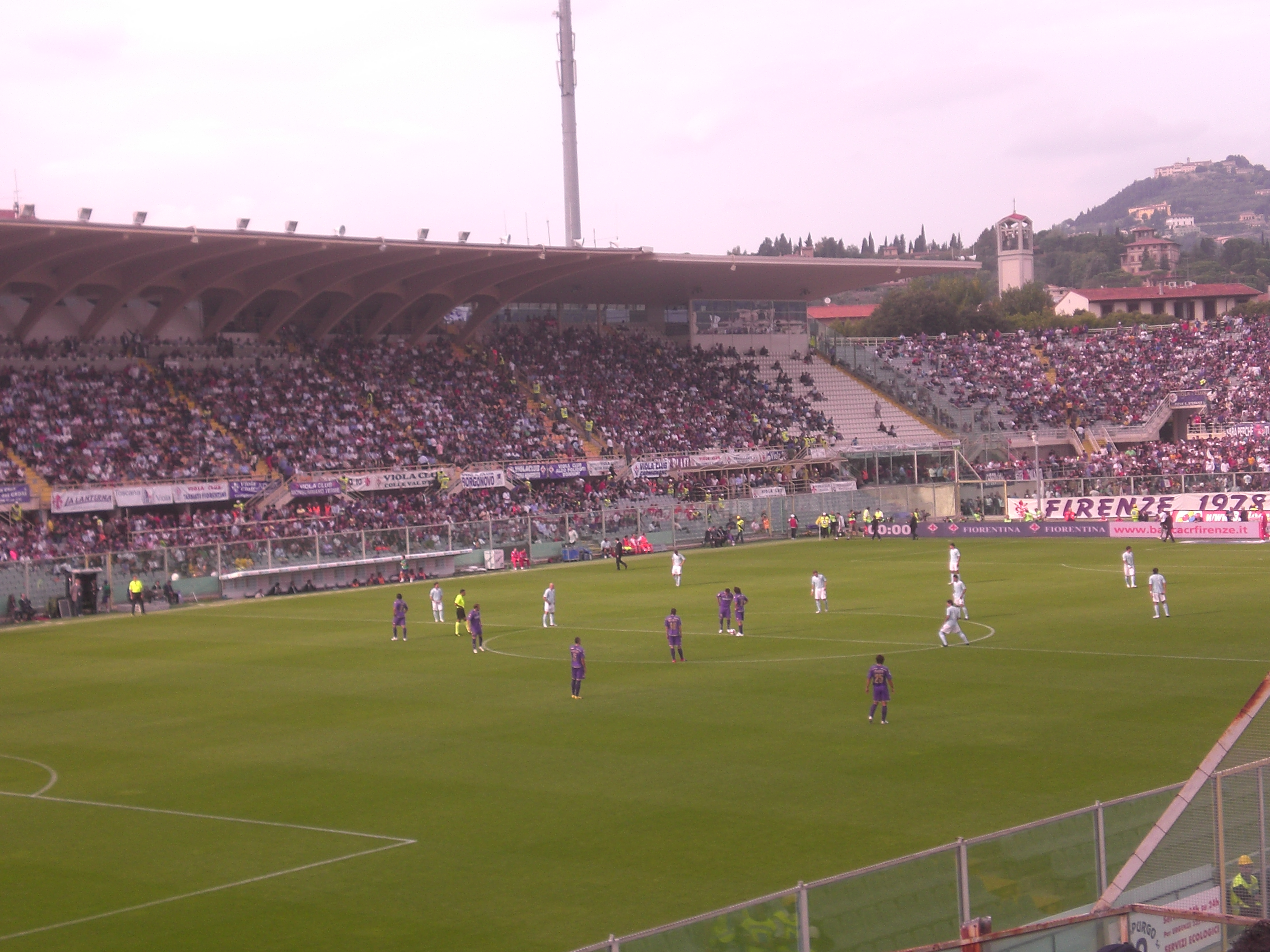
Adrian Mutu and Stevan Jovetić kicking off Fiorentina-Lazio on 4 October 2009.

The following weekend, Lazio made the trip to Catania to take on Catania at the Angelo Massimino. Catania went immediately ahead after few minutes, by a valuable shot by Jorge Andrés Martínez just inside the penalty area. In the second half, Ballardini replaced Mourad Meghni with Julio Cruz: it was a successful move, as the Argentine striker equalized at the 57th minute by a header after Foggia's cross.

The league schedule took Lazio back to Stadio Olimpico for their next game against Parma on 23 September. As the match against Catania, Lazio went down in the first half, when Valeri Bojinov fired home on the volley within the box. However, Cruz gained a penalty kick at the 41st minute, when he was chopped down by McDonald Mariga inside the area. The penalty was kicked by Zárate who finalized and equalised. Only three minutes later, and Lazio returned the favour to Parma, as Kolarov took Bojinov down and was sent off. Nicola Amoruso made no mistake and put Parma ahead for the second time. Lazio, without a man, wasn't able to equalise again and collected the third home defeat in a row.

=== League table ===
Pos	Team	Pld	W	D	L	GF	GA	GD	Pts
10	Bari	38	13	11	14	49	49	0	50
11	Fiorentina	38	13	8	17	48	47	+1	47
12	Lazio	38	11	13	14	39	43	−4	46
13	Catania	38	10	15	13	44	45	−1	45
14	Chievo	38	12	8	18	37	42	−5	44 (Note: Chievo finished ahead of Udinese and Cagliari on head-to-head points: Chievo: 8 pts, Udinese: 6 pts, Cagliari: 1 pts.)

Source: Lega Calcio and Yahoo! Sport
Rules for classification: 1) points; 2) head-to-head points; 3) head-to-head goal difference; 4) head-to-head goals scored; 5) goal difference; 6) number of goals scored.

=== Results summary ===
Overall								Home						Away					
Pld	W	D	L	GF	GA	GD	Pts	W	D	L	GF	GA	GD	W	D	L	GF	GA	GD
38	11	13	14	39	43	−4	46	5	6	8	19	21	−2	6	7	6	20	22	−2

=== Results by round ===
Round	1	2	3	4	5	6	7	8	9	10	11	12	13	14	15	16	17	18	19	20	21	22	23	24	25	26	27	28	29	30	31	32	33	34	35	36	37	38
Ground	H	A	H	A	H	H	A	H	A	H	A	H	A	H	A	H	A	H	A	A	H	A	H	A	A	H	A	H	A	H	A	H	A	H	A	H	A	H
Result	W	W	L	D	L	D	D	D	L	L	D	L	D	D	L	W	L	W	D	L	D	D	L	W	L	D	L	L	W	W	D	D	W	L	W	L	W	W
Position	6	4	6	7	10	10	11	13	15	15	15	16	15	15	16	15	17	15	16	16	16	16	18	16	16	17	17	17	17	16	16	17	16	16	15	16	14	12

Updated to match(es) played on 15 May 2010. Source: Competitive matches
A = Away; H = Home; W = Win; D = Draw; L = Loss

=== Matches ===
23 August 2009 1	Lazio	1–0	Atalanta	Rome
20:45 CEST (UTC+02:00)	Rocchi 22'			Stadium: Stadio Olimpico; Attendance: 25,000; Referee: Nicola Pierpaoli

30 August 2009 2	Chievo	1–2	Lazio	Verona
20:45 CEST (UTC+02:00)	Pellissier 16'		Cruz 41' (pen.), 53'	Stadium: Stadio Marc'Antonio Bentegodi; Attendance: 8,581; Referee: Antonio Damato

12 September 2009 3	Lazio	0–2	Juventus	Rome
20:45 CEST (UTC+02:00)			Cáceres 72'; Trezeguet 90'	Stadium: Stadio Olimpico; Attendance: 55,000; Referee: Andrea Gervasoni

20 September 2009 4	Catania	1–1	Lazio	Catania
15:00 CEST (UTC+02:00)	Martínez 12'		Cruz 57'	Stadium: Stadio Angelo Massimino; Attendance: 12,150; Referee: Emidio Morganti

23 September 2009 5	Lazio	1–2	Parma	Rome
20:45 CEST (UTC+02:00)	Zárate 42' (pen.)		Bojinov 21'; Amoruso 45+1' (pen.)	Stadium: Stadio Olimpico; Attendance: 28,000; Referee: Massimiliano Velotto

27 September 2009 6	Lazio	1–1	Palermo	Rome
15:00 CEST (UTC+02:00)	Zárate 84'		Cavani 75'	Stadium: Stadio Olimpico; Attendance: 31,109; Referee: Mauro Bergonzi

4 October 2009 7	Fiorentina	0–0	Lazio	Florence
15:00 CEST (UTC+02:00)				Stadium: Stadio Artemio Franchi; Attendance: 26,436; Referee: Christian Brighi

18 October 2009 8	Lazio	1–1	Sampdoria	Rome
15:00 CEST (UTC+02:00)	Matuzalém 42'		Pazzini 40'	Stadium: Stadio Olimpico; Attendance: 33,103; Referee: Daniele Orsato

25 October 2009 9	Bari	2–0	Lazio	Bari
15:00 CET (UTC+01:00)	Barreto 11'; Meggiorini 69'			Stadium: Stadio San Nicola; Attendance: 20,675; Referee: Sebastiano Peruzzo

28 October 2009 10	Lazio	0–1	Cagliari	Rome
20:45 CET (UTC+01:00)			Matri 50'	Stadium: Stadio Olimpico; Attendance: 28,000; Referee: Christian Brighi

1 November 2009 11	Siena	1–1	Lazio	Siena
15:00 CET (UTC+01:00)	Maccarone 32'		Mauri 8'	Stadium: Stadio Artemio Franchi; Attendance: 10,060; Referee: Nicola Pierpaoli

8 November 2009 12	Lazio	1–2	Milan	Rome
15:00 CET (UTC+01:00)	Silva 64' (o.g.)		Silva 21'; Pato 34'	Stadium: Stadio Olimpico; Attendance: 38,207; Referee: Antonio Damato

22 November 2009 13	Napoli	0–0	Lazio	Naples
15:00 CET (UTC+01:00)				Stadium: Stadio San Paolo; Attendance: 46,524; Referee: Massimiliano Saccani

29 November 2009 14	Lazio	0–0	Bologna	Rome
15:00 CET (UTC+01:00)				Stadium: Stadio Olimpico; Attendance: 30,489; Referee: Mauro Bergonzi

6 December 2009 15	Roma	1–0	Lazio	Rome
20:45 CET (UTC+01:00)	Cassetti 78'			Stadium: Stadio Olimpico; Attendance: 54,273; Referee: Nicola Rizzoli

13 December 2009 16	Lazio	1–0	Genoa	Rome
15:00 CET (UTC+01:00)	Kolarov 45+1'			Stadium: Stadio Olimpico; Attendance: 29,489; Referee: Domenico Celi

20 December 2009 17	Internazionale	1–0	Lazio	Milan
20:45 CET (UTC+01:00)	Eto'o 14'			Stadium: San Siro; Attendance: 52,859; Referee: Carmine Russo

6 January 2010 18	Lazio	4–1	Livorno	Rome
15:00 CET (UTC+01:00)	Floccari 48', 54'; Rocchi 72'; Kolarov 90+1' (pen.)		Bergvold 7'	Stadium: Stadio Olimpico; Attendance: 30,865; Referee: Antonio Giannoccaro

10 January 2010 19	Udinese	1–1	Lazio	Udine
15:00 CET (UTC+01:00)	Di Natale 27'		Floccari 16'	Stadium: Stadio Friuli; Attendance: 15,044; Referee: Mauro Bergonzi

17 January 2010 20	Atalanta	3–0	Lazio	Bergamo
15:00 CET (UTC+01:00)	Doni 5', 9'; Padoin 35'			Stadium: Stadio Atleti Azzurri d'Italia; Attendance: 10,000; Referee: Trefoloni

24 January 2010 21	Lazio	1–1	Chievo	Rome
15:00 CET (UTC+01:00)	Stendardo 18'		Pellissier 77'	Stadium: Stadio Olimpico; Attendance: 30,308; Referee: Christian Brighi

31 January 2010 22	Juventus	1–1	Lazio	Turin
20:45 CET (UTC+01:00)	Del Piero 70' (pen.)		Mauri 78'	Stadium: Stadio Olimpico di Torino; Attendance: 20,899; Referee: Massimiliano Saccani

7 February 2010 23	Lazio	0–1	Catania	Rome
15:00 CET (UTC+01:00)			López 63'	Stadium: Stadio Olimpico; Attendance: 32,496; Referee: Gabriele Gava

14 February 2010 24	Parma	0–2	Lazio	Parma
15:00 CET (UTC+01:00)			Stendardo 68'; Zárate 88'	Stadium: Stadio Ennio Tardini; Attendance: 15,400; Referee: Andrea De Marco

21 February 2010 25	Palermo	3–1	Lazio	Palermo
15:00 CET (UTC+01:00)	Hernández 1'; Miccoli 28' (pen.); Nocerino 58'		Kolarov 78'	Stadium: Stadio Renzo Barbera; Attendance: 23,104; Referee: Gianluca Rocchi

27 February 2010 26	Lazio	1–1	Fiorentina	Rome
20:45 CET (UTC+01:00)	Siviglia 7'		Keirrison 90+2'	Stadium: Stadio Olimpico; Attendance: 10,000; Referee: Andrea Romeo

7 March 2010 27	Sampdoria	2–1	Lazio	Genoa
15:00 CET (UTC+01:00)	Guberti 29'; Pazzini 36'		Floccari 7'	Stadium: Stadio Luigi Ferraris; Attendance: 23,000; Referee: Christian Brighi

14 March 2010 28	Lazio	0–2	Bari	Rome
15:00 CET (UTC+01:00)			Almirón 51'; Álvarez 64'	Stadium: Stadio Olimpico; Attendance: 46,942; Referee: Nicola Rizzoli

21 March 2010 29	Cagliari	0–2	Lazio	Cagliari
15:00 CET (UTC+01:00)			Rocchi 4'; Floccari 37'	Stadium: Stadio Sant'Elia; Attendance: 12,000; Referee: Domenico Celi

24 March 2010 30	Lazio	2–0	Siena	Rome
20:45 CET (UTC+01:00)	Lichtsteiner 6'; Cruz 72'			Stadium: Stadio Olimpico; Attendance: 40,000; Referee: Mauro Bergonzi

28 March 2010 31	Milan	1–1	Lazio	Milan
20:45 CEST (UTC+02:00)	Borriello 18' (pen.)		Lichtsteiner 32'	Stadium: San Siro; Attendance: 40,393; Referee: Paolo Tagliavento

3 April 2010 32	Lazio	1–1	Napoli	Rome
15:00 CEST (UTC+02:00)	Floccari 4'		Hamšík 38'	Stadium: Stadio Olimpico; Attendance: 31,820; Referee: Daniele Orsato

11 April 2010 33	Bologna	2–3	Lazio	Bologna
15:00 CEST (UTC+02:00)	Guana 11'; Portanova 16'		Mauri 44'; Dias 63'; Rocchi 68'	Stadium: Stadio Renato Dall'Ara; Attendance: 21,000; Referee: Roberto Rosetti

18 April 2010 34	Lazio	1–2	Roma	Rome
18:30 CEST (UTC+02:00)	Rocchi 14'		Vučinić 53' (pen.), 63'	Stadium: Stadio Olimpico; Attendance: 61,615; Referee: Paolo Tagliavento

25 April 2010 35	Genoa	1–2	Lazio	Genoa
15:00 CEST (UTC+02:00)	Palacio 8'		Dias 25'; Floccari 32'	Stadium: Stadio Luigi Ferraris; Attendance: 26,082; Referee: Emidio Morganti

2 May 2010 36	Lazio	0–2	Internazionale	Rome
20:45 CEST (UTC+02:00)			Samuel 45+1'; Motta 70'	Stadium: Stadio Olimpico; Attendance: 50,945; Referee: Mauro Bergonzi

9 May 2010 37	Livorno	1–2	Lazio	Livorno
15:00 CEST (UTC+02:00)	Lucarelli 33'		Rocchi 13'; Brocchi 41'	Stadium: Stadio Armando Picchi; Attendance: 9,214; Referee: Gabriele Gava

15 May 2010 38	Lazio	3–1	Udinese	Rome
15:00 CEST (UTC+02:00)	Hitzlsperger 15'; Floccari 45'; Brocchi 52'		Di Natale 30'	Stadium: Stadio Olimpico; Attendance: 32,000; Referee: Marco Guida

=== Top Scorers ===
- (Italy) Sergio Floccari 8
- (Italy) Tommaso Rocchi 4
- (Argentina) Julio Cruz 4
- (Italy) Stefano Mauri 3
- (Argentina) Mauro Zárate 3
- (Serbia) Aleksandar Kolarov 3

== Coppa Italia ==
As winners of the tournament the previous season, Lazio automatically qualified to the Round of 16 for the 2009–10 Coppa Italia.

14 January 2010 Round of 16	Lazio	2–0	Palermo	Rome
21:00 CET (UTC+01:00)	Kolarov 57'; Floccari 74'			Stadium: Stadio Olimpico; Attendance: 10,000; Referee: Paolo Tagliavento

20 January 2010 Quarter-finals	Fiorentina	3–2	Lazio	Florence
21:00 CET (UTC+01:00)	Mutu 9', 44'; Krøldrup 59'		Zárate 50'; Rocchi 67'	Stadium: Stadio Artemio Franchi; Attendance: 10,565; Referee: Domenico Celi

== UEFA Europa League ==
=== Play-off round ===
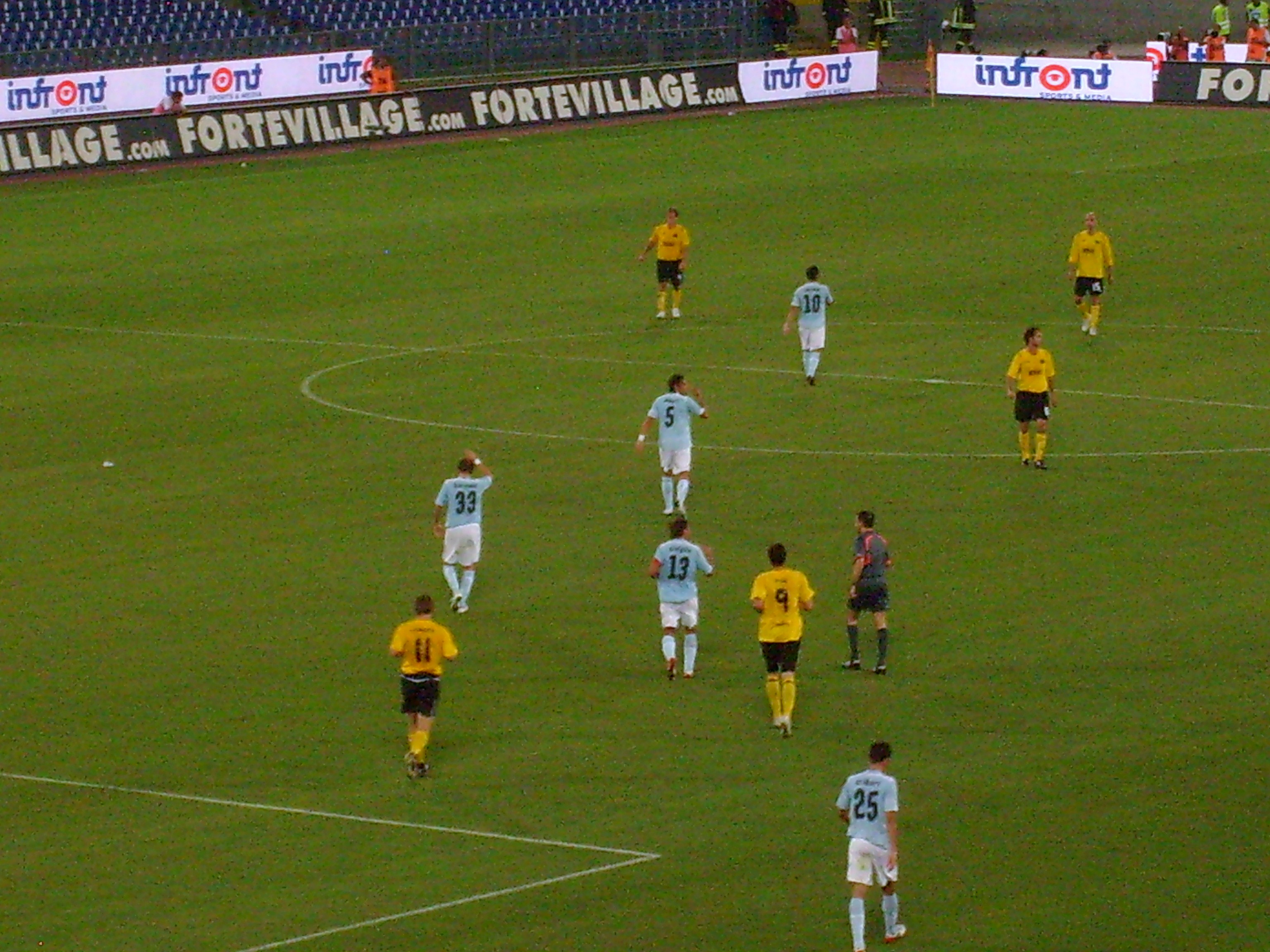
Lazio–Elfsborg at the Stadio Olimpico in Rome.

Despite Lazio finishing 10th in the 2008–09 Serie A placing, which does not allow participation in European Competitions, the team could participate in the new Europa League due to the triumph in the 2009 Coppa Italia Final.

Lazio started from the Play-off round, where in Nyon they drew Swedish club IF Elfsborg on 7 August. The first leg was played in Rome, where Lazio won 3–0. Elfsborg went behind after 24 minutes, as Aleksandar Kolarov scored from outside the area with an unstoppable shot that Ante Čović couldn't save. After 12 minutes, Mauro Zárate doubled with a placed shot after a move on the left. Elfsborg tried to score at least one goal, with Fernando Muslera saving multiple shots in the second half, but at the 69th minute, Stefano Mauri, assisted by Zárate, didn't miss in front of Čović and locked the match up for Lazio.

The team started the preparation for the second leg on 25 August, when they trained in the afternoon on an artificial turf pitch, to get used to play on this material present at the Borås Arena, the home ground of Elfsborg. The next day, the team left to Borås. There, Lazio ran into the first defeat of the season, losing for 1–0 at the Borås Arena. Elfsborg went ahead when Denni Avdić scored at the 70th minute by head. In the next minutes, the Swedish team tried to make other two goals to lead the match to the extra time: there was many nervousness, with Kolarov who was sent out and other seven players cautioned at the end of the game. Anyway, Lazio won 3–0 on aggregate and could pass at the group stage.

20 August 2009 First leg	Lazio (Italy)	3–0	(Sweden) Elfsborg	Rome, Italy
20:45	Kolarov 23'; Zárate 35'; Mauri 69'	Report		Stadium: Stadio Olimpico; Attendance: 18,000; Referee: Douglas McDonald (Scotland)

27 August 2009 Second leg	Elfsborg (Sweden)	1–0 (1–3 agg.)	(Italy) Lazio	Borås, Sweden
19:00	Avdić 70'	Report		Stadium: Borås Arena; Attendance: 11,693; Referee: Oleg Oriekhov (Ukraine)

=== Group stage ===
The draw for the group stage took place in Monaco on 28 August 2009. As the 24th top ranked side in this competition, Lazio was seeded in Pot 2 and couldn't meet any team of his own country. Eventually, they were drawn into Group G with Villarreal of Spain, Levski Sofia of Bulgaria and Red Bull Salzburg of Austria.

Lazio started against Red Bull Salzburg on 17 September at home. After a poor first half, Lazio created a flurry of chances in the second half, and went ahead at the 59th minute thanks to Pasquale Foggia by a left-foot shot from the distance. When the match seemed to be going to finish, Salzburg equalized by Franz Schiemer after a defensive error by Lazio at the 82nd minute. Unbelievably, Salzburg went ahead in the stoppage time by Marc Janko, who scored after Cribari unintentionally passed him the ball disastrously. As Villarreal won 1–0 against Levsky Sofia, Lazio was sent temporarily at the third place of the group.

For the next match, two weeks later, Lazio travelled to Sofia to meet Levski Sofia side. The Biancocelesti began the game strongly, and took the lead at the 22nd minute by Matuzalém, who assisted by Zárate in front of the net easily concluded. The Argentine forward doubled at the end of the first half, shooting by right foot beating Tzvetan Dimitrov, Levski Sofia's third goalkeeper who this time was guilty on the goal. Levski tried to respond in the second half, and continued to press their opponents as they took control of the game: Lazio then made them pay for their lack of finishing. Foggia spotted an opening and fed Mourad Meghni, who scored the third goal in front of Dimitrov. Not many minutes later, Foggia opened again, Youssef Rabeh slipped and fell, allowing Rocchi to tap it after avoiding Dimitrov, completing a 4–0 win for Lazio, the biggest one in their season so far. In the meantime, Salzburg surprisingly won in Europe again, this time 2–0 against Villarreal, taking the top of the group, while Lazio reached the second place.

Lazio got their first win at home after almost two months on 22 October, when they were visited from Villarreal. Initially, they hardly got into the game, and didn't create any chances, but despite their poor start, it was them who took the lead. Cruz assisted Zárate in front of Diego López and chipped the ball over him and into the back of the net. Villarreal's dominance finally paid off, however, as they equalized by a Sebastián Eguren's header after a Joan Capdevila cross.

Lazio came out stronger side in the second half, but were then dealt a major blow as Matuzalém was sent off for a suspect diving. As the match seemed to be finished, Rocchi did win the points at the death, scoring after Kolarov cross from the left that finalized through the goalkeeper's legs at the 92nd minute. By this victory, Lazio stayed at the second place of the group, three points above Villarreal and three points below Salzburg that won for the third time in a row in Europe.

Pos	Team	Pld	W	D	L	GF	GA	GD	Pts	Qualification
1	(Austria) Red Bull Salzburg	6	6	0	0	9	2	+7	18	Advance to knockout phase
2	(Spain) Villarreal	6	3	0	3	8	6	+2	9	Advance to knockout phase
3	(Italy) Lazio	6	2	0	4	9	10	−1	6	
4	(Bulgaria) Levski Sofia	6	1	0	5	1	9	−8	3	

Source: Soccerway

17 September 2009 1	Lazio (Italy)	1–2	(Austria) Red Bull Salzburg	Rome, Italy
21:05 CEST	Foggia 59'	Report	Schiemer 82'; Janko 90+3'	Stadium: Stadio Olimpico; Attendance: 25,000; Referee: Saïd Ennjimi (France)

1 October 2009 2	Levski Sofia (Bulgaria)	0–4	(Italy) Lazio	Sofia, Bulgaria
19:00 CEST		Report	Matuzalém 22'; Zárate 45+1'; Meghni 67'; Rocchi 74'	Stadium: Georgi Asparuhov Stadium; Attendance: 16,500; Referee: Nikolay Ivanov (Russia)

22 October 2009 3	Lazio (Italy)	2–1	(Spain) Villarreal	Rome, Italy
19:00 CEST	Zárate 20'; Rocchi 90+2'	Report	Eguren 40'	Stadium: Stadio Olimpico; Attendance: 20,000; Referee: Ivan Bebek (Croatia)

5 November 2009 4	Villarreal (Spain)	4–1	(Italy) Lazio	Villarreal, Spain
21:05 CET	Pires 2', 15' (pen.); Cani 13'; Rossi 83' (pen.)	Report	Zárate 73'	Stadium: Estadio El Madrigal; Attendance: 15,000; Referee: Knut Kircher (Germany)

2 December 2009 5	Red Bull Salzburg (Austria)	2–1	(Italy) Lazio	Salzburg, Austria
19:00 CET	Afolabi 52'; Tchoyi 78'	Report	Foggia 57'	Stadium: Red Bull Arena; Attendance: 26,270; Referee: Alexandru Tudor (Romania)

17 December 2009 6	Lazio (Italy)	0–1	(Bulgaria) Levski Sofia	Rome, Italy
21:05 CET		Report	Yovov 61'	Stadium: Stadio Olimpico; Attendance: 3,000; Referee: William Collum (Scotland)

== Squad statistics ==
No.	Pos.	Name	League		Coppa Italia		Europe		Other		Total		Discipline	
No.	Pos.	Name	Apps	Goals	Apps	Goals	Apps	Goals	Apps	Goals	Apps	Goals	Yellow card	Red card
1	GK	(Argentina) Albano Bizzarri	0	0	0	0	3	0	0	0	3	0	0	0
2	DF	(Switzerland) Stephan Lichtsteiner	11(1)	0	0	0	5	1	1	0	17(1)	0	4	0
3	DF	(Argentina) Lionel Scaloni	1(1)	0	0	0	0	0	0	0	1(1)	0	0	0
4	DF	(Italy) Fabio Firmani	0	0	0	0	0	0	0	0	0	0	0	0
5	MF	(Italy) Stefano Mauri	11(1)	1	0	0	4(3)	1	1	0	16(4)	2	2	0
6	MF	(France) Ousmane Dabo	8(4)	0	0	0	4(3)	0	1(1)	0	13(7)	0	2	1
7	MF	(Portugal) Eliseu	1(1)	0	0	0	4(3)	0	0	0	5(4)	0	0	0
8	MF	(Brazil) Matuzalém	10(2)	0	0	0	5	1	1	1	16(2)	3	4	1
9	FW	(Italy) Tommaso Rocchi (c)	8(3)	1	0	0	3(1)	2	1	1	12(4)	4	0	0
10	FW	(Argentina) Mauro Zárate	10	1	0	0	5(1)	3	1	0	16(1)	5	2	0
11	DF	(Serbia) Aleksandar Kolarov	9	0	0	0	3(1)	1	1	0	13(1)	1	3	2
13	DF	(Italy) Sebastiano Siviglia	7	0	0	0	2	0	1	0	10	0	1	0
17	MF	(Italy) Pasquale Foggia	9(2)	0	0	0	3(2)	1	0	0	12(3)	2	2	0
18	FW	(Nigeria) Stephen Makinwa	0	0	0	0	0	0	0	0	0	0	0	0
19	FW	(North Macedonia) Goran Pandev	0	0	0	0	0	0	0	0	0	0	0	0
21	FW	(Italy) Simone Inzaghi	2(2)	0	0	0	0	0	0	0	2(2)	0	1	0
23	MF	(France) Mourad Meghni	3(2)	0	0	0	3	1	0	0	6(2)	1	1	0
24	MF	(Argentina) Cristian Ledesma	0	0	0	0	0	0	0	0	0	0	0	0
25	DF	(Brazil) Emílson Cribari	8(2)	0	0	0	5	0	1(1)	0	14(3)	0	2	1
26	DF	(Romania) Ștefan Radu	6	0	0	0	4	0	0	0	10	0	0	0
28	DF	(Italy) Guglielmo Stendardo	0	0	0	0	0	0	0	0	0	0	0	0
32	MF	(Italy) Cristian Brocchi	5	0	0	0	2	0	1	0	8	0	1	0
33	MF	(Italy) Roberto Baronio	10	0	0	0	4	0	1	0	15	0	3	1
52	DF	(Italy) Alessio Luciani	1(1)	0	0	0	0	0	0	0	1(1)	0	0	0
68	MF	(Ivory Coast) Christian Manfredini	0	0	0	0	0	0	0	0	0	0	0	0
74	FW	(Argentina) Julio Cruz	10(5)	3	0	0	4	0	1(1)	0	15(6)	3	2	0
80	DF	(Brazil) André Dias	0	0	0	0	0	0	0	0	0	0	0	0
81	MF	(Italy) Simone Del Nero	2	0	0	0	0	0	0	0	2	0	1	0
86	GK	(Uruguay) Fernando Muslera	11	0	0	0	2	0	1	0	14	0	2	0
87	DF	(France) Modibo Diakité	7(1)	0	0	0	3(2)	0	1	0	11(3)	0	1	0
87	DF	(Italy) Riccardo Perpetuini	2	0	0	0	0	0	0	0	2	0	1	0

Statistics accurate as of match played 28 October 2009

== Transfers ==
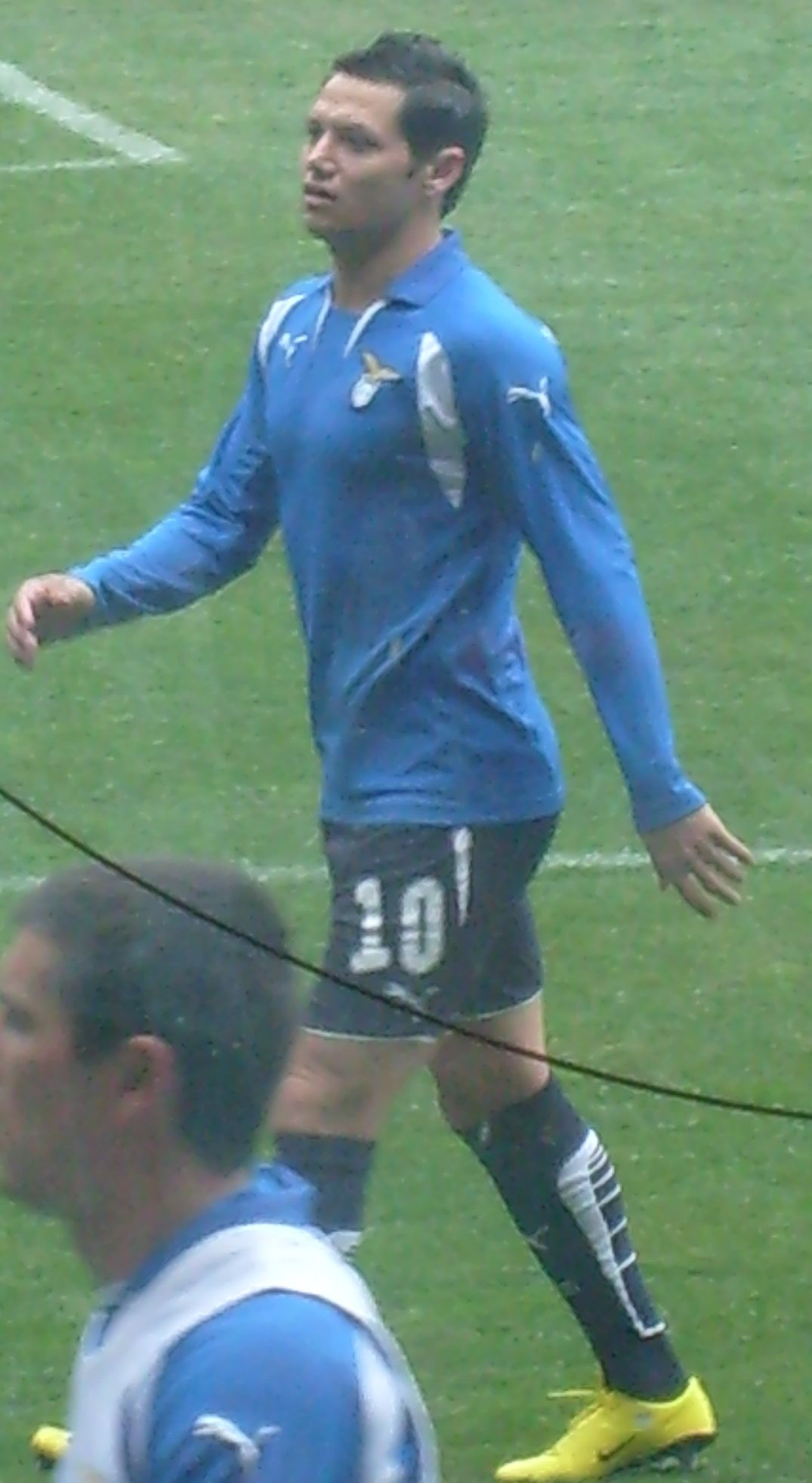
Mauro Zárate was the 2009 fourth-most expensive player of Serie A, behind Samuel Eto'o, Felipe Melo and Diego.

Lazio opened their summer market signing the goalkeeper Albano Bizzarri for free from Catania on 10 June, in offing of the departure of Juan Pablo Carrizo, who had stated many times his will to leave in the previous months. The next week, team president Claudio Lotito, after having spent many days in Qatar dealing with Al-Sadd Sports Club board, confirmed that Mauro Zárate's move to Lazio was made permanent for a fee of about €20 million. Later, it was reported that the player signed a new five-year contract with a €60 million buy-out clause. He was the most expensive signing during Lotito's chairmanship in five years. Before June finished, also the international Portuguese Eliseu reached Rome from Málaga for €1 million.

As expected, Carrizo left Lazio at the beginning of July. He was loaned out to Real Zaragoza in a €1 million season-long deal, with Carrizo having an option of signing permanently. Brazilian player Matuzalém, who was initially on loan for a season, was signed permanently for €6.5 million. Luciano Zauri was loaned out to Sampdoria and Alessandro Tuia to Monza. The end of July saw the departure of Czech defender David Rozehnal to German side Hamburger SV for €5 million, and the signing of the Argentine forward Julio Cruz, who had rescinded his contract with Internazionale.

At the end of August, the week of the transfer deadline, academy graduate Lorenzo De Silvestri signed for Fiorentina for €6 million. Also the young forwards Libor Kozák and Ettore Mendicino left the club on loan to Brescia and Crotone respectively.

Come the winter transfer window, Uruguayan youngster Gonzalo Barreto will be joining from Danubio with Lazio having already sealed a €3 million deal, but he will only join in January, when he has turned eighteen.

On 31 January, the club claimed to have signed Israeli prospect Eyal Golasa. However, the move was disputed by the club he played with until then, Maccabi Haifa, which claimed to have a valid contract with him.

And the last day of winter transfer window, Lazio signed Brazilian defender André Dias from São Paulo for a €2.5 million fee.

=== In ===
Date	Pos.	Name	Fromvi	Fee
10 June 2009	GK	(Argentina) Albano Bizzarri	(Italy) Catania	Free
18 June 2009	FW	(Argentina) Mauro Zárate	(Qatar) Al-Sadd	€20,000,000
25 June 2009	MF	(Portugal) Eliseu	(Spain) Málaga	€1,000,000
9 July 2009	MF	(Brazil) Matuzalém	(Spain) Real Zaragoza	€6,500,000
31 July 2009	FW	(Argentina) Julio Cruz	(Italy) Internazionale	Free
3 January 2010	CF	(Italy) Sergio Floccari	(Italy) Genoa	Loan
22 January 2010	FW	(Uruguay) Gonzalo Barreto	(Uruguay) Danubio	€3,000,000
31 January 2010	MF	(Germany) Thomas Hitzlsperger	(Germany) VfB Stuttgart	€1,000,000
1 February 2010	DF	(Brazil) André Dias	(Brazil) São Paulo	€2,500,000

=== Out ===
Date	Pos.	Name	To	Fee
27 July 2009	DF	(Czech Republic) David Rozehnal	(Germany) Hamburger SV	€5,000,000
26 August 2009	DF	(Italy) Lorenzo De Silvestri	(Italy) Fiorentina	€6,000,000
1 January 2010	CF	(North Macedonia) Goran Pandev	(Italy) Internazionale	Free

=== Loaned out ===
Date From	Date To	Pos.	Name	Moving To	Fee
9 July 2009	End of the season	GK	(Argentina) Juan Pablo Carrizo	(Spain) Real Zaragoza	€1,000,000
9 July 2009	End of the season	DF	(Italy) Luciano Zauri	(Italy) Sampdoria	Free
14 July 2009	End of the season	DF	(Italy) Alessandro Tuia	(Italy) Monza	Free
19 August 2009	End of the season	FW	(Czech Republic) Libor Kozák	(Italy) Brescia	Free
27 August 2009	End of the season	FW	(Italy) Ettore Mendicino	(Italy) Crotone	Free
5 January 2010	End of the season	DF	(Brazil) Emílson Cribari	(Italy) Siena	Free
8 January 2010	End of the season	MF	(Portugal) Eliseu	(Spain) Real Zaragoza	Free
12 January 2010	End of the season	MF	(Italy) Riccardo Perpetuini	(Italy) Crotone	Free
25 January 2010	End of the season	DF	(Italy) Ivan Artipoli	(Italy) Foggia	Free

=== Estimated transfer totals ===
Expenditure

Summer: ▼€27,500,000

Winter: ▼€6,000,000

Total: ▼€33,500,000

Income

Summer: ▲€11,000,000

Winter: ▲€0

Total: ▲€11,000,000

Overall

Summer: ▼€16,500,000

Winter: ▼€6,000,000

Total: ▼€22,500,000

== See also ==
- 2009–10 Serie A
- 2009–10 Coppa Italia
- 2009–10 UEFA Europa League
- 2009 Supercoppa Italiana
