= 2010–11 SS Lazio season =

Lazio
2010–11 season
- President: Claudio Lotito
- Manager: Edoardo Reja
- Stadium: Stadio Olimpico
- Serie A: 5th
- Coppa Italia: Round of 16
- Top goalscorer: League: Hernanes (11); All: Hernanes (12)
- Highest home attendance: 53,000 (vs Juventus, 2 May 2011)
- Lowest home attendance: 16,000 (vs Cesena, 19 March 2011)
- Average home league attendance: 31,400
Home colours	Away colours	Third colours

The 2010–11 season was the 111th season in Società Sportiva Lazio's history and their club's 23rd consecutive season in the top-flight of Italian football.

== Season review ==
=== Pre-season ===
Part of the pre-season was dominated by speculation surrounding Aleksandar Kolarov's possible transfer. In late July, Manchester City managed to procure the left back. A couple of days, later Lazio presented Javier Garrido, surplus to requirements in Manchester City, as his replacement.

Lazio was also able to land Brazilian international Hernanes from São Paulo. The highly rated player signed a five-year deal with the club for an undisclosed fee thought to be in the region of £8.2 million. He was given shirt number 8, previously worn by Karel Poborský and Bernardo Corradi, among others.

== Players ==
=== Squad information ===
As of 17 September 2010

Note: Flags indicate national team as defined under FIFA eligibility rules; some limited exceptions apply. Players may hold more than one non-FIFA nationality.

No.	Pos.	Nation	Player
1	GK	ARG	Albano Bizzarri
2	DF	SUI	Stephan Lichtsteiner
3	DF	BRA	André Dias
5	DF	ARG	Lionel Scaloni
6	MF	ITA	Stefano Mauri (vice-captain)
7	FW	URU	Gonzalo Barreto
8	MF	BRA	Hernanes
9	FW	ITA	Tommaso Rocchi (captain)
10	FW	ARG	Mauro Zárate
11	MF	BRA	Matuzalém
12	GK	ITA	Tommaso Berni
13	DF	ITA	Guglielmo Stendardo
14	DF	ESP	Javier Garrido
15	MF	URU	Álvaro González
17	MF	ITA	Pasquale Foggia
18	FW	CZE	Libor Kozák

No.	Pos.	Nation	Player
20	DF	ITA	Giuseppe Biava
21	DF	FRA	Modibo Diakité
22	FW	ITA	Sergio Floccari
23	MF	AUS	Mark Bresciano
24	MF	ITA	Cristian Ledesma
26	DF	ROU	Ștefan Radu
31	MF	ALG	Mourad Meghni
32	MF	ITA	Cristian Brocchi
56	FW	ITA	Lorenzo Cinque
61	MF	ITA	Enrico Zampa
68	MF	CIV	Christian Manfredini
77	FW	ITA	Giuseppe Sculli
79	MF	ITA	Riccardo Bonetto
81	FW	ITA	Simone Del Nero
86	GK	URU	Fernando Muslera
99	GK	ITA	Alessandro Berardi

== Competitions ==
=== Serie A ===
==== League table ====
Pos	Team	Pld	W	D	L	GF	GA	GD	Pts	Qualification or relegation
3	Napoli	38	21	7	10	59	39	+20	70	Qualification to Champions League group stage
4	Udinese	38	20	6	12	65	43	+22	66 (Note: Udinese finished ahead of Lazio on head-to-head away goals scored: Udinese 2–1 Lazio, Lazio 3–2 Udinese.)	Qualification to Champions League play-off round
5	Lazio	38	20	6	12	55	39	+16	66	Qualification to Europa League play-off round (Note: As Internazionale won the 2010–11 Coppa Italia and already qualified for the Champions League, Palermo entered the 2011–12 UEFA Europa League third qualification round as the cup runners-up.)
6	Roma	38	18	9	11	59	52	+7	63	Qualification to Europa League play-off round
7	Juventus	38	15	13	10	57	47	+10	58	

Source: Lega Serie A
Rules for classification: 1) points; 2) head-to-head points; 3) head-to-head goal difference; 4) head-to-head goals scored; 5) goal difference; 6) number of goals scored.

==== Results summary ====
Overall								Home						Away					
Pld	W	D	L	GF	GA	GD	Pts	W	D	L	GF	GA	GD	W	D	L	GF	GA	GD
38	20	6	12	55	39	+16	66	13	3	3	31	15	+16	7	3	9	24	24	0

Last updated: 22 May 2011.
Source: Competitive matches

==== Results by round ====
Round	1	2	3	4	5	6	7	8	9	10	11	12	13	14	15	16	17	18	19	20	21	22	23	24	25	26	27	28	29	30	31	32	33	34	35	36	37	38
Ground	A	H	A	H	A	H	A	H	A	H	A	H	A	H	H	A	H	A	H	H	A	H	A	H	A	H	A	H	A	H	A	H	A	A	H	A	H	A
Result	L	W	W	D	W	W	W	W	W	L	L	W	D	D	W	L	W	D	L	W	L	W	D	D	W	W	L	W	L	W	L	W	W	L	L	L	W	W
Position	14	7	3	4	1	1	1	1	1	1	2	2	2	2	2	2	2	2	4	3	5	4	4	4	4	4	4	4	5	5	5	4	4	4	4	6	5	5

Updated to match(es) played on 22 May 2011. Source: Competitive matches
A = Away; H = Home; W = Win; D = Draw; L = Loss

==== Matches ====
29 August 2010 1	Sampdoria	2–0	Lazio	Genoa
20:45 CEST (UTC+02:00)	Cassano 60' (pen.); Guberti 71'; Ziegler (yellow card) 74'	Report	Dias (yellow card) 11'; Radu (yellow card) 40'; Biava (yellow card) 58'; Lichtsteiner (yellow card) 61'	Stadium: Stadio Luigi Ferraris; Attendance: 21,504; Referee: Andrea Romeo

12 September 2010 2	Lazio	3–1	Bologna	Rome
15:00 CEST (UTC+02:00)	Brocchi (yellow card) 60'; Mauri 68'; Rocchi 75'; Hernanes 90+4' (pen.)	Report	Britos (yellow card) 60'; Mudingayi 78'	Stadium: Stadio Olimpico; Attendance: 22,462; Referee: Antonio Danilo Giannoccaro

18 September 2010 3	Fiorentina	1–2	Lazio	Florence
18:00 CEST (UTC+02:00)	Ljajić 19' (pen.)	Report	Ledesma 32'; Kozák 67'	Stadium: Stadio Artemio Franchi; Attendance: 21,000; Referee: Antonio Damato

22 September 2010 4	Lazio	1–1	Milan	Rome
20:45 CEST (UTC+02:00)	Floccari 81'	Report	Ibrahimović 66'	Stadium: Stadio Olimpico; Attendance: 38,199; Referee: Luca Banti

26 September 2010 5	ChievoVerona	0–1	Lazio	Verona
15:00 CEST (UTC+02:00)		Report	Zárate 69'	Stadium: Stadio Marc'Antonio Bentegodi; Attendance: 6,500; Referee: Sebastiano Peruzzo

3 October 2010 6	Lazio	1–0	Brescia	Rome
15:00 CEST (UTC+02:00)	Mauri 45'	Report		Stadium: Stadio Olimpico; Attendance: 29,405; Referee: Domenico Celi

17 October 2010 7	Bari	0–2	Lazio	Bari
20:45 CEST (UTC+02:00)		Report	Hernanes 52'; Floccari 61'	Stadium: Stadio San Nicola; Attendance: 24,000; Referee: Gianluca Rocchi

24 October 2010 8	Lazio	2–1	Cagliari	Rome
15:00 CEST (UTC+02:00)	Floccari 21'; Mauri 53'	Report	Matri 59'	Stadium: Stadio Olimpico; Attendance: 32,391; Referee: Paolo Mazzoleni

31 October 2010 9	Palermo	0–1	Lazio	Palermo
12:30 CET (UTC+01:00)		Report	Dias 27'	Stadium: Stadio Renzo Barbera; Attendance: 29,539; Referee: Antonio Damato

7 November 2010 10	Lazio	0–2	Roma	Rome
15:00 CET (UTC+01:00)		Report	Borriello 52' (pen.); Vučinić 87' (pen.)	Stadium: Stadio Olimpico; Attendance: 52,121; Referee: Emidio Morganti

10 November 2010 11	Cesena	1–0	Lazio	Cesena
20:45 CET (UTC+01:00)	Parolo 85'	Report		Stadium: Stadio Dino Manuzzi; Attendance: 15,279; Referee: Daniele Orsato

14 November 2010 12	Lazio	2–0	Napoli	Rome
12:30 CET (UTC+01:00)	Zárate 15'; Floccari 61'	Report		Stadium: Stadio Olimpico; Attendance: 24,323; Referee: Mauro Bergonzi

21 November 2010 13	Parma	1–1	Lazio	Parma
15:00 CET (UTC+01:00)	Crespo 23'	Report	Floccari 45+3'	Stadium: Stadio Ennio Tardini; Attendance: 15,000; Referee: Nicola Rizzoli

28 November 2010 14	Lazio	1–1	Catania	Rome
15:00 CET (UTC+01:00)	Hernanes 45+1'	Report	Silvestre 44'	Stadium: Stadio Olimpico; Attendance: 22,183; Referee: Gabriele Gava

3 December 2010 15	Lazio	3–1	Internazionale	Rome
20:45 CET (UTC+01:00)	Biava 26'; Zárate 52'; Hernanes 89'	Report	Pandev 74'	Stadium: Stadio Olimpico; Attendance: 39,710; Referee: Daniele Orsato

12 December 2010 16	Juventus	2–1	Lazio	Turin
20:45 CET (UTC+01:00)	Chiellini 2'; Muslera 90+4' (o.g.)	Report	Zárate 14'	Stadium: Stadio Olimpico di Torino; Attendance: 25,000; Referee: Paolo Tagliavento

19 December 2010 17	Lazio	3–2	Udinese	Rome
12:30 CET (UTC+01:00)	Hernanes 2'; Biava 52'; Zapata 88' (o.g.)	Report	Sánchez 49'; Denis 61'	Stadium: Stadio Olimpico; Attendance: 20,644; Referee: Andrea Gervasoni

6 January 2011 18	Genoa	0–0	Lazio	Genoa
15:00 CET (UTC+01:00)		Report		Stadium: Stadio Luigi Ferraris; Attendance: 23,000; Referee: Andrea Romeo

9 January 2011 19	Lazio	1–2	Lecce	Rome
15:00 CET (UTC+01:00)	Mauri 47'	Report	Muslera 39' (o.g.); Grossmüller 72'	Stadium: Stadio Olimpico; Attendance: 25,313; Referee: Nicola Pierpaoli

16 January 2011 20	Lazio	1–0	Sampdoria	Rome
15:00 CET (UTC+01:00)	Kozák 84'	Report		Stadium: Stadio Olimpico; Attendance: 21,616; Referee: Nicola Rizzoli

23 January 2011 21	Bologna	3–1	Lazio	Bologna
15:00 CET (UTC+01:00)	Ramírez 36'; Di Vaio 39', 90'	Report	Floccari 5'	Stadium: Stadio Renato Dall'Ara; Attendance: 20,000; Referee: Gianluca Rocchi

29 January 2011 22	Lazio	2–0	Fiorentina	Rome
18:00 CET (UTC+01:00)	Kozák 69' (pen.), 73'	Report		Stadium: Stadio Olimpico; Attendance: 20,844; Referee: Andrea De Marco

1 February 2011 23	Milan	0–0	Lazio	Milan
20:45 CET (UTC+01:00)		Report		Stadium: San Siro; Attendance: 38,809; Referee: Antonio Damato

6 February 2011 24	Lazio	1–1	ChievoVerona	Rome
CET (UTC+01:00)	Hernanes 45+3'	Report	Cesar 64'	Stadium: Stadio Olimpico; Attendance: 21,443; Referee: Leonardo Baracani

13 February 2011 25	Brescia	0–2	Lazio	Brescia
15:00 CET (UTC+01:00)		Report	A. González 17'; Kozák 58'	Stadium: Stadio Mario Rigamonti; Attendance: 7,000; Referee: Antonio Danilo Giannoccaro

20 February 2011 26	Lazio	1–0	Bari	Rome
15:00 CET (UTC+01:00)	Hernanes 6'	Report		Stadium: Stadio Olimpico; Attendance: 22,000; Referee: Nicola Pierpaoli

27 February 2011 27	Cagliari	1–0	Lazio	Cagliari
15:00 CET (UTC+01:00)	Dias 40' (o.g.)	Report		Stadium: Stadio Sant'Elia; Attendance: 6,000; Referee: Carmine Russo

6 March 2011 28	Lazio	2–0	Palermo	Rome
20:45 CET (UTC+01:00)	Sculli 7', 18'	Report		Stadium: Stadio Olimpico; Attendance: 25,000; Referee: Gabriele Gava

13 March 2011 29	Roma	2–0	Lazio	Rome
15:00 CET (UTC+01:00)	Totti 69', 90+3' (pen.)	Report		Stadium: Stadio Olimpico; Attendance: 45,000; Referee: Paolo Tagliavento

19 March 2011 30	Lazio	1–0	Cesena	Rome
18:00 CET (UTC+01:00)	Zárate 2'	Report		Stadium: Stadio Olimpico; Attendance: 16,000; Referee: Antonio Danilo Giannoccaro

3 April 2011 31	Napoli	4–3	Lazio	Naples
12:30 CEST (UTC+02:00)	Dossena 60'; Cavani 62', 82' (pen.), 88'	Report	Mauri 29'; Dias 56'; Aronica 68' (o.g.)	Stadium: Stadio San Paolo; Attendance: 60,000; Referee: Luca Banti

10 April 2011 32	Lazio	2–0	Parma	Rome
15:00 CEST (UTC+02:00)	Hernanes 23'; Floccari 77'	Report		Stadium: Stadio Olimpico; Attendance: 35,000; Referee: Paolo Mazzoleni

17 April 2011 33	Catania	1–4	Lazio	Catania
15:00 CEST (UTC+02:00)	Schelotto 46'	Report	Hernanes 40'; Mauri 56'; Floccari 78'; Zárate 89'	Stadium: Stadio Angelo Massimino; Attendance: 15,699; Referee: Nicola Rizzoli

23 April 2011 34	Internazionale	2–1	Lazio	Milan
15:00 CEST (UTC+02:00)	Sneijder 40'; Eto'o 53'	Report	Zárate 24' (pen.)	Stadium: San Siro; Attendance: 60,000; Referee: Emidio Morganti

2 May 2011 35	Lazio	0–1	Juventus	Rome
20:45 CEST (UTC+02:00)		Report	Pepe 87'	Stadium: Stadio Olimpico; Attendance: 53,000; Referee: Paolo Mazzoleni

8 May 2011 36	Udinese	2–1	Lazio	Udine
15:00 CEST (UTC+02:00)	Di Natale 35', 42'	Report	Kozák 76'	Stadium: Stadio Friuli; Attendance: 23,000; Referee: Nicola Rizzoli

14 May 2011 37	Lazio	4–2	Genoa	Rome
18:00 CEST (UTC+02:00)	Biava 6'; Rocchi 52'; Hernanes 55', 66'	Report	Palacio 12'; Floro Flores 89'	Stadium: Stadio Olimpico; Attendance: 35,000; Referee: Antonio Damato

22 May 2011 38	Lecce	2–4	Lazio	Lecce
20:45 CEST (UTC+02:00)	Coppola 33'; Piatti 41'	Report	Rocchi 6'; Zárate 35', 54' (pen.); Vives 62' (o.g.)	Stadium: Stadio Via del Mare; Attendance: 19,000; Referee: Gianluca Rocchi

=== Coppa Italia ===
27 October 2010 Third round	Lazio	3–0	Portosummaga	Rome
21:00 CEST	González 8'; Kozák 35'; Bresciano 55'	Report		Stadium: Stadio Olimpico; Attendance: 2,950; Referee: Antonio Giannoccaro

25 November 2010 Fourth round	Lazio	3–0	AlbinoLeffe	Rome
18:00 CET	Garrido 16'; Stendardo 45'; Del Nero 84'	Report		Stadium: Stadio Olimpico; Attendance: 3,000; Referee: Carmine Russo

19 January 2011 Round of 16	Roma	2–1	Lazio	Rome
21:00 CET	Borriello 53' (pen.); Simplício 77'	Report	Hernanes 57' (pen.)	Stadium: Stadio Olimpico; Attendance: 40,637; Referee: Mauro Bergonzi

== Statistics ==
=== Appearances and goals ===
No.	Pos	Nat	Player	Total		Serie A		Coppa Italia	
No.	Pos	Nat	Player	Apps	Goals	Apps	Goals	Apps	Goals
1	GK	(Argentina) ARG	Albano Bizzarri	0	0	0	0	0	0
2	DF	(Switzerland) SUI	Stephan Lichtsteiner	35	0	34	0	1	0
3	DF	(Brazil) BRA	André Dias	34	2	33	2	1	0
5	MF	(Argentina) ARG	Lionel Scaloni	14	0	12	0	2	0
6	MF	(Italy) ITA	Stefano Mauri	30	6	29	6	1	0
8	MF	(Brazil) BRA	Hernanes	37	12	36	11	1	1
9	FW	(Italy) ITA	Tommaso Rocchi	19	3	17	3	2	0
10	FW	(Argentina) ARG	Mauro Zárate	36	9	35	9	1	0
11	MF	(Brazil) BRA	Matuzalém	23	0	22	0	1	0
12	GK	(Italy) ITA	Tommaso Berni	5	-3	2	-1	3	-2
13	DF	(Italy) ITA	Guglielmo Stendardo	16	1	14	0	2	1
14	DF	(Spain) ESP	Javier Garrido	12	1	10	0	2	1
15	MF	(Uruguay) URU	Álvaro González	22	2	19	1	3	1
16	MF	(Italy) ITA	Riccardo Perpetuini	1	0	0	0	1	0
17	FW	(Italy) ITA	Pasquale Foggia	11	0	9	0	2	0
18	FW	(Czech Republic) CZE	Libor Kozák	22	7	19	6	3	1
20	DF	(Italy) ITA	Giuseppe Biava	36	3	35	3	1	0
21	DF	(France) FRA	Modibo Diakité	10	0	8	0	2	0
22	FW	(Italy) ITA	Sergio Floccari	31	8	30	8	1	0
23	MF	(Australia) AUS	Mark Bresciano	23	1	20	0	3	1
24	MF	(Italy) ITA	Cristian Ledesma	36	1	34	1	2	0
26	DF	(Romania) ROU	Ștefan Radu	27	0	26	0	1	0
32	MF	(Italy) ITA	Cristian Brocchi	33	0	31	0	2	0
39	DF	(Belgium) BEL	Luis Pedro Cavanda	5	0	3	0	2	0
68	MF	(Italy) ITA	Christian Manfredini	4	0	4	0	0	0
77	FW	(Italy) ITA	Giuseppe Sculli	13	2	13	2	0	0
81	FW	(Italy) ITA	Simone Del Nero	4	1	2	0	2	1
86	GK	(Uruguay) URU	Fernando Muslera	36	-38	36	-38	0	0
