= Mourad Meghni =

Algerian former professional footballer (born 1984)

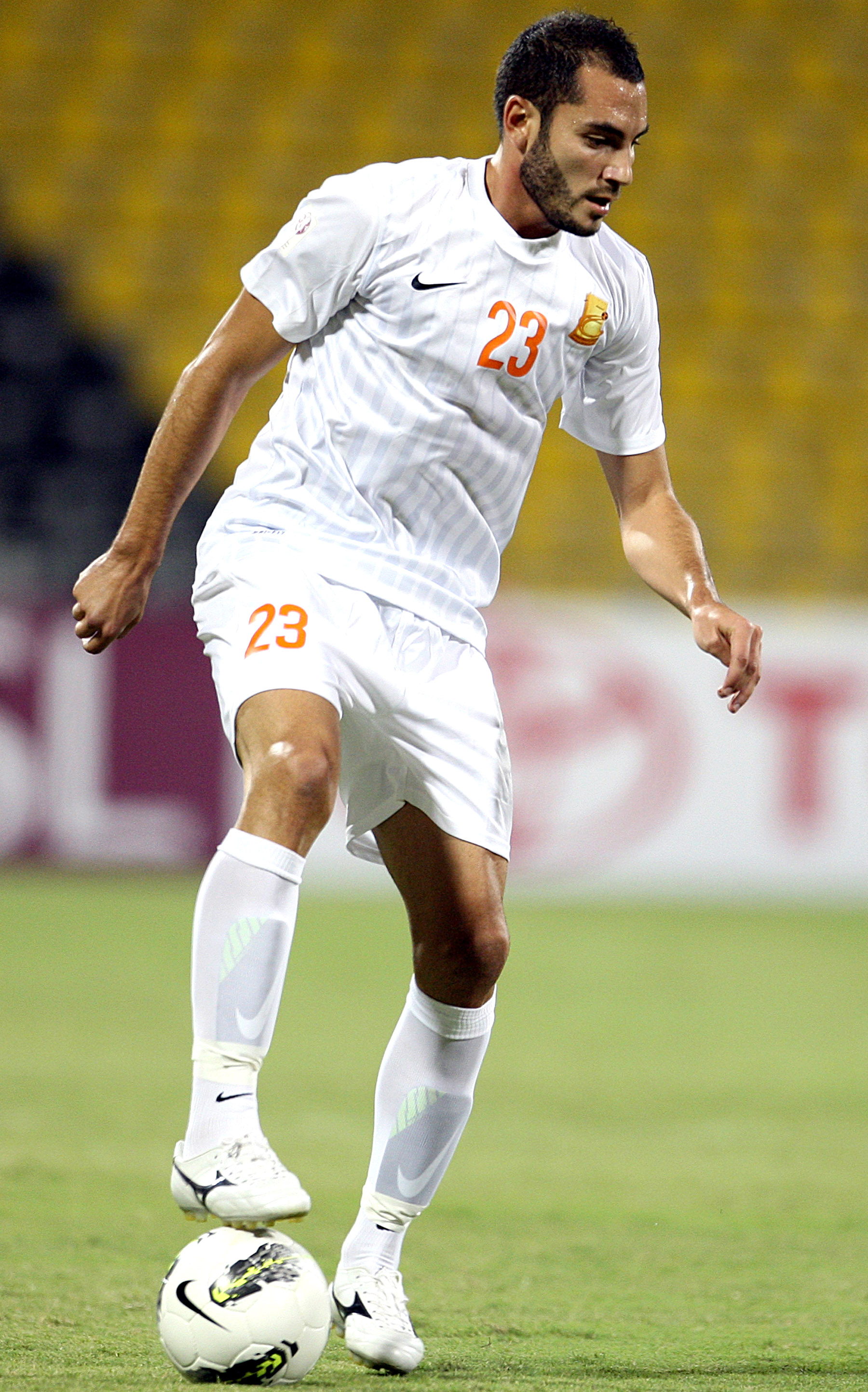
- Meghni playing for Umm Salal in 2011

Personal information
- Date of birth: 16 April 1984 (age 42)
- Place of birth: Paris, France
- Height: 1.80 m (5 ft 11 in)
- Positions: Attacking midfielder; winger

Youth career
- 1992–1996: AS Champs-sur-Marne
- 1996–1999: Torcy
- 1997–2000: INF Clairefontaine
- 2000–2002: Bologna

Senior career*
Years	Team	Apps	(Gls)
2002–2007	Bologna	72	(7)
2005–2006	→ Sochaux (loan)	16	(0)
2007–2011	Lazio	48	(0)
2011–2012	Umm Salal	4	(0)
2012	→ Al-Khor (loan)	2	(0)
2012	Lekhwiya	4	(0)
2015–2017	CS Constantine	19	(6)
Total		165	(13)

International career
2000–2001	France U17		
2002–2003	France U19	9	(0)
2003–2005	France U21	7	(0)
2009–2010	Algeria	9	(0)
Medal record
Representing France
Men's Football
Gold medal – first place	2001 Trinidad and Tobago	Team competition
- * Club domestic league appearances and goals

Mourad Meghni (Arabic: مراد مغني; born 16 April 1984) is a former professional footballer who played as an attacking midfielder or winger. He was known for his excellent technique. As a young footballer in France, his ability and Algerian heritage earned him the nickname "petit Zidane".

Aged thirteen, Meghni joined the famous academy INF Clairefontaine. In 2000 he opted to move on to Bologna, for whom he made his professional debut on 20 July 2002, against FC BATE in the Intertoto Cup, coming on as a substitute. With Bologna, he came runner-up in the 2002 Intertoto Cup losing out to Fulham on aggregate 5–3. In the summer of 2007, Meghni signed with Lazio on a co-ownership deal for €1.75 million, with the club further paying Bologna an additional €1.75 million for full ownership, in the summer of 2008. He won the 2008–09 Coppa Italia, as well as the 2009 Supercoppa Italiana whilst playing for Lazio.

Meghni is a former French youth international and was a part of the team that won the 2001 FIFA U-17 World Championship, held in Trinidad and Tobago. He opted to play for Algeria at senior level in August 2009, taking advantage of FIFA's new ruling, allowing him to change his national allegiance despite being older than 21 years of age. He made his debut for Algeria in a 1–0 win on 12 August 2009, against Uruguay. He went on to play for Algeria at the 2010 Africa Cup of Nations in Angola.

== Early life ==
Meghni was born on 16 April 1984 in Paris to Ali and Anna, an Algerian father and a Portuguese mother. His father during an interview spoke about how Mourad had been attracted by football at a very early age and that he used to take him to football stadiums very often notably to encourage his older brother Saïd who preceded him on the football pitches. His father also spoke on how Mourad joined several football training schools at an early age including that of Tursi and FC Nantes in France where he made impressive and swift progress as a budding player. His mother stated during the interview that she had always made it her duty together with her husband to visit Algeria every year to get together with all the family members and friends in the family home of Ouled Hadadj.

At the age of 13 Meghni joined the national football school at Clairefontaine there he vastly improved his technique, prior to joining the academy Meghni always played on small pitches hence he learnt quickly the necessary skills and technique that would be needed when beating a man, whilst at Clairefontaine he had a Brazilian coach, Francisco Filho, who helped him improve his technique which became known for. Meghni remained at the national football school at Clairefontaine for three years and signed a non-solicitation agreement with Cannes during his first season.

Due to financial problems Cannes was not sure it could keep their academy, and Meghni could not sign for any other French club because of his non-solicitation agreement. In the summer of 2000, Meghni decided to sign with Bologna and he did not end up joining AS Cannes. Meghni views this period as a learning experience as he was very young when he signed this agreement for AS Cannes.

== Club career ==
=== Bologna ===
As a youth player, Meghni moved from the renowned Clairefontaine academy to Bologna, where he played from the 2000–01 season to the 2004–05 season. He made his Serie A debut on 12 January 2003 in a 2–0 loss at home to Milan. Meghni then spent the 2005–06 season on loan to French Ligue 1 side Sochaux, before returning to Bologna.

While at Bologna, Meghni was never able to turn his talent into success and consistency, and as such was never a favourite among the fans. He made a statement following Bologna's relegation to Serie B, in which he declared he would never play in what he considered to be a sub-standard competition. He did spend a year in Serie B, his last at the club, where he was a regular for the entire season, yet only found the net twice.

=== Lazio ===
In the 2007–08 season, Meghni joined Lazio on a co-ownership deal for €1.75 million fee. His early performances for the Biancocelesti were not impressive, and he failed to nail down a regular place in the line-up, only starting seven matches for the season. He did make his debut in the UEFA Champions League, setting up a crucial goal for Tommaso Rocchi, which gave the club their only win in the competition, at home to Werder Bremen. In June 2008 the co-ownership was renewed, but in July, Meghni was fully bought by Lazio from Bologna for another €1.75 million. (as part of the deal of Gaby Mudingayi) After the arrival of Matuzalém, and due to many injury's, Meghni became a backup player, and in December 2009 injured. His contract with Lazio was mutually terminated on 10 June 2011.

=== Umm Salal ===
After a four-year stint playing for the Rome-based club, Meghni joined the Qatar Stars League outfit Umm-Salal on 11 June 2011.

=== Al Khor ===
On 29 March 2012, it was announced Meghni would join Al Khor on a temporary loan.

=== Lekhwiya ===
On 6 July 2012, Meghni moved from Umm Salal to league rival Lekhwiya SC on a free transfer.

== International career ==
On 12 August 2009, Meghni was selected for the first time to join the ranks of the Algeria national team, in a game facing Uruguay (Algeria won on a score of 1–0).

Meghni was not in Algeria's final World Cup squad after being informed that his knee injury had not sufficiently healed and would require surgery despite the great lengths that both the player and the Fennecs medical team had gone to give him a chance of recovering in time.

== Personal life ==
Meghni's father, Ammi Ali, is Algerian while his mother, Anna, is a Portuguese national. He is married. His older brother, Saïd Meghni, was also a footballer and played briefly in Portugal for Tirsense and Moreirense, in the 1999–2000 season, and then in Italy for Bologna's primavera team.

== Career statistics ==
Appearances and goals by club, season and competition
Club	Season	League			National Cup		League Cup		Continental		Super Cup		Total	
Club	Season	Division	Apps	Goals	Apps	Goals	Apps	Goals	Apps	Goals	Apps	Goals	Apps	Goals
Bologna	2002–03	Serie A	0	0	1	0	–		–		–		1	0
Bologna	2002–03	Serie A	8	2	1	0	–		3	0	–		12	2
Bologna	2003–04	Serie A	12	0	2	0	–		–		–		14	0
Bologna	2004–05	Serie A	17	3	2	0	–		–		–		19	3
Bologna	2006–07	Serie B	35	2	1	0	–		–		–		36	2
Bologna	Total		72	7	7	0	–		3	0	–		82	7
Sochaux (loan)	2005–06	Ligue 1	16	0	1	0	1	0	–		–		18	0
Lazio	2007–08	Serie A	19	0	1	0	–		4	0	–		24	0
Lazio	2008–09	Serie A	22	0	3	1	–		–		0	0	25	1
Lazio	2009–10	Serie A	7	0	0	0	–		4	1	–		11	1
Lazio	2010–11	Serie A	0	0	0	0	–		–		0	0	0	0
Lazio	Total		48	0	4	1	–		8	1	–		60	2
Umm Salal	2011–12	QSL	4	0	1	0	–		–		4	1	9	1
Al-Khor (loan)	2012	QSL	2	0	–		–		–		–		2	0
Lekhwiya	2012	QSL	4	0	–		–		–		–		4	0
CS Constantine	2015–16	Algerian Ligue 1	11	1			–				–		11	1
CS Constantine	2015–16	Algerian Ligue 1	8	5			–				–		8	5
CS Constantine	Total		19	6			–				–		19	6
Career total			165	13	13	1	1	0	12	2	4	1	196	17

== Honours ==
Bologna

- UEFA Intertoto Cup: runner-up 2002

Lazio

- Coppa Italia: 2008–09
- Supercoppa Italiana: 2009

France U17

- FIFA U-17 World Cup: 2001
