= Perpetuini =

Perpetuini is a surname. Notable people with the surname include:

- David Perpetuini (born 1979), English footballer
- Riccardo Perpetuini (born 1990), Italian footballer
