= Alessio Luciani =

Italian footballer (born 1990)

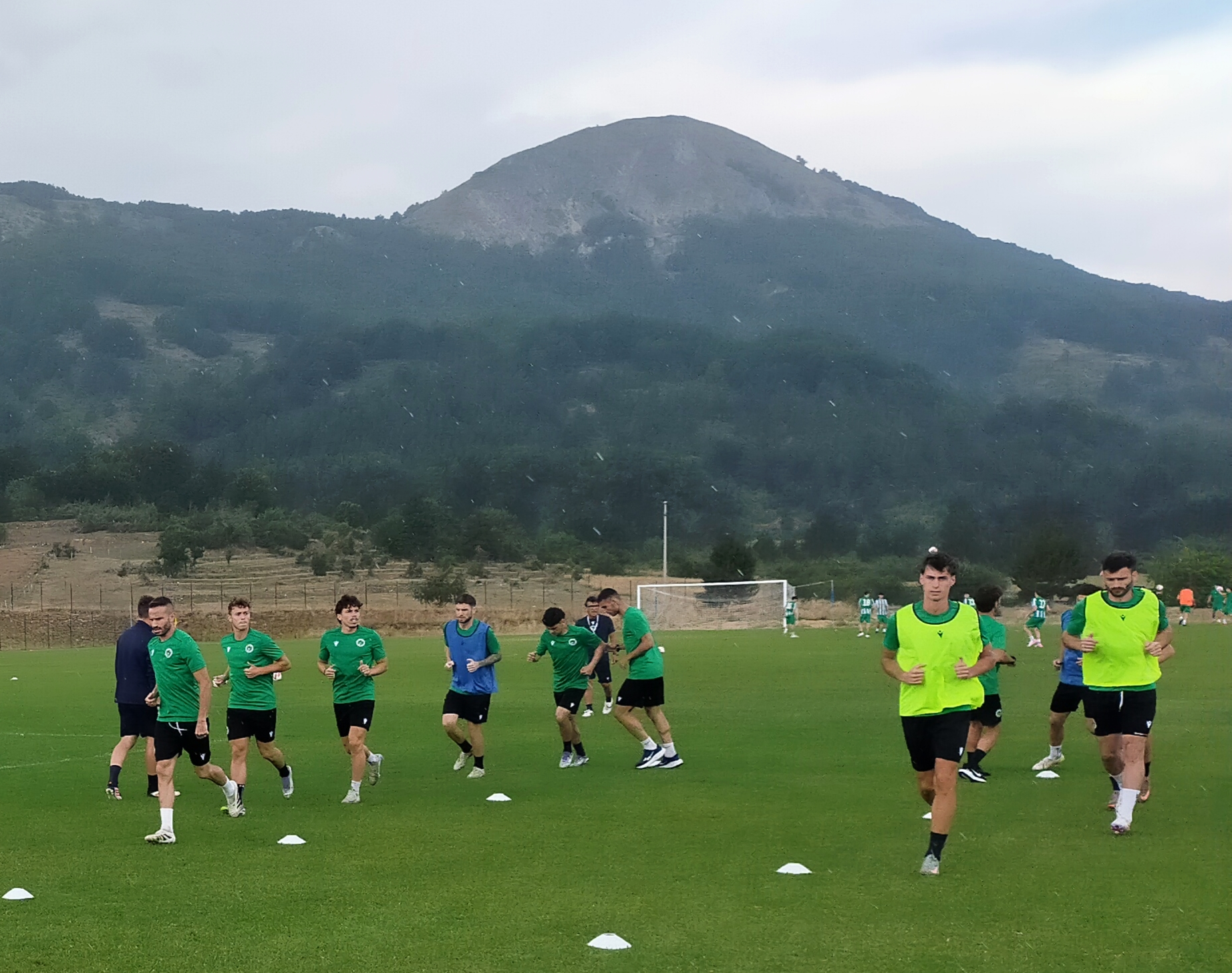
- Alessio Luciani, first on the left (FC Avezzano, 2026)

Personal information
- Date of birth: 16 January 1990 (age 36)
- Place of birth: Rieti, Italy
- Height: 1.76 m (5 ft 9 in)
- Position: Defender

Team information
- Current team: FC Avezzano
- Number: 3

Youth career
- 2002–2009: Lazio

Senior career*
Years	Team	Apps	(Gls)
2009–2011	Lazio	1	(0)
2010–2012	→ Lumezzane (loan)	47	(0)
2012–2013	→ Salernitana (loan)	29	(1)
2013–2014	Salernitana	20	(0)
2014–2015	Gubbio	37	(1)
2015–2016	Monopoli	35	(0)
2016–2021	Arezzo	155	(2)
2021–2023	Reggiana	66	(0)
2023–2024	Taranto	23	(0)
2024–2025	Feralpisalò	26	(0)
2025–2026	Cavese	25	(0)
2026	FC Avezzano		(0)
- * Club domestic league appearances and goals as of 2 July 2026

Alessio Luciani (born 16 January 1990) is an Italian professional footballer who plays as a defender for italian club Forza e Coraggio Avezzano.

== Biography ==
Alessio Luciani, born in Rieti and originally from Pescorocchiano in Lazio. He began playing football in the youth teams of Avezzano, in Abruzzo, and later in SS Lazio Youth Sector.

== Club career ==
He made his Serie A debut on 4 October 2009, coming on as an 85th-minute substitute for Simone Del Nero in a 0–0 draw to Fiorentina at the Artemio Franchi.

On 7 July 2021, he signed with Reggiana. On 1 September 2023, Luciani's contract with Reggiana was terminated by mutual consent.

On 15 November 2023, Luciani signed for Serie C club Taranto until the end of the season.

He later played with Feralpisalò and Cavese; in 2026 he signed for Forza e Coraggio Avezzano.

== Career statistics ==
Club	Season	League		Cup		League Cup		Europe		Other		Total	
Club	Season	Apps	Goals	Apps	Goals	Apps	Goals	Apps	Goals	Apps	Goals	Apps	Goals
Lazio	2009–10	1	0	0	0	0	0	0	0	0	0	1	0
Lumezzane	2010–11	16	0	2	0	-	-	-	-	-	-	18	0
Lumezzane	2011–12	31	0	2	0	-	-	-	-	-	-	33	0
Total Lumezzane		47	0	4	0	0	0	0	0	0	0	51	0
Salernitana	2012–13	0	0	0	0	-	-	-	-	-	-	0	0
Total		48	0	4	0	0	0	0	0	0	0	52	0

Statistics accurate as of match played 14 August 2012.
