= Modibo Diakité =

French footballer (born 1987)

Personal information
- Full name: Modibo Diakité
- Date of birth: 2 March 1987 (age 39)
- Place of birth: Bourg-la-Reine, France
- Height: 1.92 m (6 ft 4 in)
- Position: Centre-back

Youth career
- Sampdoria
- 2004–2006: Pescara
- 2006: Lazio

Senior career*
Years	Team	Apps	(Gls)
2005–2006	Pescara	1	(0)
2006–2013	Lazio	65	(2)
2013–2014	Sunderland	7	(0)
2014	→ Fiorentina (loan)	9	(0)
2014–2015	Deportivo La Coruña	2	(0)
2015	Cagliari	9	(0)
2015–2016	Frosinone	18	(1)
2016	Sampdoria	8	(0)
2017	Ternana	15	(1)
2017–2018	Bari	0	(0)
2018–2022	Ternana	36	(2)
2022–2023	Roma City	13	(0)
2023–2024	LUISS Roma		
2024–2025	Parioli Calcio		
- * Club domestic league appearances and goals as of 6 October 2025

Modibo Diakité (born 2 March 1987) is a French professional footballer who plays as a centre-back.

== Club career ==
=== Pescara ===
Born in Bourg-la-Reine, Diakité moved to Italy, and joined Sampdoria's youth setup. In 2004, he moved to Pescara, being initially assigned to the Primavera team.

Diakité made his first-team debut on 28 May 2006, in a 0–0 away draw against Mantova for the Serie B championship. Despite only playing one match for the first team, the 19-year-old Pescara youth product was recognized by giants Lazio, who signed him at the end of the 2005–06 season in co-ownership deal for €250,000.

=== Lazio ===
Although spending the vast majority of his first campaign appearing with the youth squad, Diakité made his first-team – and Serie A – debut on 1 April 2007, replacing Guglielmo Stendardo in the dying minutes of a 4–2 away win against Udinese. His first start came late in the month, in a 0–1 home loss against Fiorentina, also having a goal disallowed.

In June 2007 Lazio signed Diakité outright for another €250,000, and he was handed a starting spot for the first match of the campaign, against Torino. However, he eventually broke his tibia in the 2–2 home draw, missing the remainder of the season.

On 27 November 2008, Diakité extended his link with the Biancazzurri until 2013. He played his first match after returning from injury on 3 December, starting in a 2–1 away win against Milan for the campaign's Coppa Italia.

Diakité scored his first professional goal on 14 December 2008, netting his side's second through a header in a 3–3 away draw against Udinese.

=== Sunderland ===
On 10 June 2013, Premier League side Sunderland announced the arrival of Diakité on a free transfer. A starter under Paolo Di Canio, he was deemed surplus to requirements by new manager Gus Poyet, and was subsequently loaned to Fiorentina in January.

Diakité was released from Sunderland by mutual consent on 1 September 2014.

==== Fiorentina (loan) ====
On 31 January 2014, Diakité joined Fiorentina on loan for the rest of the season.

=== Deportivo La Coruña ===
On 3 September 2014, Diakité signed for La Liga side Deportivo de La Coruña. He made his debut in the competition on 20 September, starting in a 2–8 home loss against Real Madrid.

=== Frosinone ===
On 10 July 2015 Diakité signed with Frosinone. He scored his first goal with the club on 8 November 2015 in the 38th minute of a 2–2 home draw against Genoa.

=== Sampdoria ===
On 1 February 2016 Diakité signed with Sampdoria.

=== Later years ===
In January 2017 Diakité signed with Ternana.

In October 2017, free agent Diakité joined Bari. After being released due to Bari's exclusion from Italian football, Diakité returned to Ternana, playing for them until June 2022.

In October 2022, Diakité agreed to return to Rome, signing for Serie D amateurs Roma City. After suffering relegation with Roma City, Diakité left to join Eccellenza amateurs LUISS Roma, coached by Guglielmo Stendardo, a former teammate of his at Lazio.

== Style of play ==
A tactically versatile right-footed defender, Diakité is usually deployed as a centreback in a 3 or 4-man defence, although he is also capable of playing as a rightback.

== Personal life ==
Born in Bourg-La-Reine, France, Diakité also owns a Malian passport, as both of his parents are originally from Mali.

== Honours ==
Lazio

- Coppa Italia: 2008–09, 2012–13, Runners-up 2013–14
- Supercoppa Italiana: 2009
