= Pasquale Foggia =

Italian former footballer

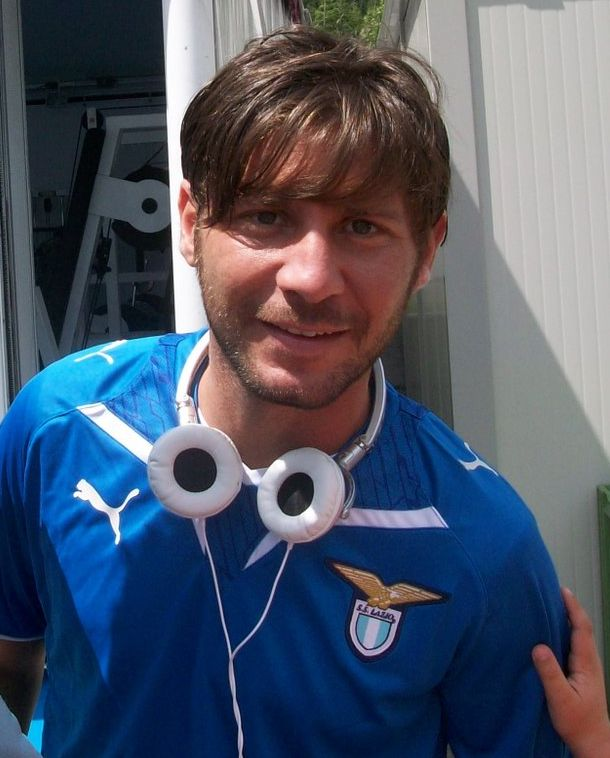
- Foggia in 2009

Personal information
- Date of birth: 3 June 1983 (age 43)
- Place of birth: Naples, Italy
- Height: 1.68 m (5 ft 6 in)
- Positions: Winger; attacking midfielder

Youth career
- Cral Banco di Napoli
- 1997–1999: Padova
- 1999–2000: Milan

Senior career*
Years	Team	Apps	(Gls)
2000–2003	Treviso	69	(13)
2003–2005	Empoli	28	(1)
2005	→ Crotone (loan)	15	(1)
2005–2006	Milan	0	(0)
2005–2006	→ Ascoli (loan)	34	(4)
2006–2013	Lazio	69	(4)
2007	→ Reggina (loan)	15	(4)
2007–2008	→ Cagliari (loan)	33	(5)
2011–2012	→ Sampdoria (loan)	31	(4)
2013	Dubai CSC	0	(0)
2013–2014	Salernitana	22	(1)
Total		316	(37)

International career
1999	Italy U-15	3	(1)
2000	Italy U-16	4	(0)
2001	Italy U-17	1	(0)
2001–2003	Italy U-20	7	(0)
2006	Italy U-21	4	(0)
2007–2009	Italy	3	(1)
- * Club domestic league appearances and goals

Pasquale Foggia (Italian pronunciation: [paˈskwaːle ˈfɔddʒa]; born 3 June 1983) is an Italian football manager and former player, who played as a left winger or attacking midfielder. A quick and creative player, he was predominantly known for his dribbling skills and his ability to create chances for teammates.

== Club career ==
Born in Naples, Italy, Foggia started playing football at a young age for local Neapolitan side Cral Banco di Napoli. He was then spotted by Padova and spent some time in their youth system before briefly playing in AC Milan's youth team before being involved in two long-term co-ownership deals (with Empoli and Treviso).

Professionally, he made his debut with Serie C1 side Treviso in 2000. Foggia played for three seasons with Treviso, gaining his first honour by helping the club to promotion into Serie B during 2003. A move to Serie A side Empoli followed, it was during the 2003–04 season that he made his first appearance at the top level of Italian football.

During the following two years Foggia was loaned out to gain more experience, first to Crotone and then to Ascoli where he spent the 2005–06 season in Serie A.

=== Lazio ===
After a loan spell at Lazio in the summer of 2006, for €150,000, he was transferred to them permanently in January 2007 from AC Milan for €3 million; the transfer deal involved Massimo Oddo moving in the opposite direction. He was sent on loan to Reggina Calcio the next day for the rest of the season, for €250,000.

While on loan at Cagliari during the 2007–08 season that Foggia began to impress which is largely due to scoring two goals against Juventus. Cagliari paid €2.5 million to Lazio for the loan. However, Cagliari president Massimo Cellino turned down the chance to sign Foggia who returned to Lazio. In 2008–09 Foggia became a key member for Lazio playing 33 games and scoring 8 goals (4 of which were free kicks).

=== Salernitana ===
On 15 August 2013, he signed with Lega Pro Prima Divisione club Salernitana.

On 1 September 2014, Foggia was released.

== International career ==
Foggia was also a member of the Italy national under-21 football team, making four appearances. After showing good form while on loan to Cagliari, he was called up for the Italy national football team, and made his senior international debut under manager Roberto Donadoni, against Georgia, on 13 October 2007.

Foggia's 2008–09 form for Lazio made him a key figure for Lazio which helped him earn a call up to the national squad under manager Marcello Lippi. In total, he made three appearances for Italy between 2007 and 2009, scoring his only international goal in a 3–0 friendly home win against Northern Ireland on 6 June 2009.

== Post-playing career ==
After retirement, Foggia took on a career as a sporting director, being first in charge of Racing Roma in 2016 and successively Benevento in 2017. At Benevento, he oversaw the club's historical first promotion to Serie A in 2020. He was dismissed on 4 February 2023.

== Honours ==
=== Club ===
Lazio

- Coppa Italia: 2008–09
- Supercoppa Italiana: 2009
