= Albano Bizzarri =

Argentine footballer

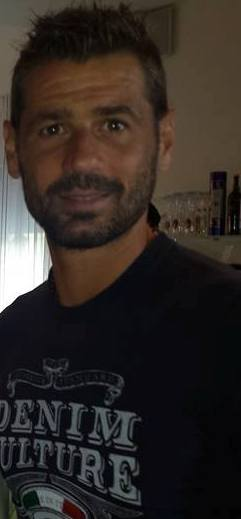
- Bizzarri in 2015

Personal information
- Full name: Albano Benjamín Bizzarri
- Date of birth: 9 November 1977 (age 49)
- Place of birth: Etruria, Argentina
- Height: 1.88 m (6 ft 2 in)
- Position: Goalkeeper

Youth career
- 1995–1996: Racing Club

Senior career*
Years	Team	Apps	(Gls)
1996–1999	Racing Club	38	(0)
1999–2000	Real Madrid	7	(0)
2000–2006	Valladolid	174	(0)
2006–2007	Gimnàstic	22	(0)
2007–2009	Catania	39	(0)
2009–2013	Lazio	12	(0)
2013–2014	Genoa	1	(0)
2014–2016	Chievo	63	(0)
2016–2017	Pescara	29	(0)
2017–2018	Udinese	32	(0)
2018–2019	Foggia	17	(0)
2019	→ Perugia (loan)	0	(0)
Total		434	(0)
- * Club domestic league appearances and goals

Albano Benjamín Bizzarri (born 9 November 1977) is an Argentine former professional footballer who played as a goalkeeper.

He spent the vast majority of his professional career in Spain and Italy, starting out at Real Madrid in 1999.

== Club career ==
=== Spain ===
Born in Etruria, Córdoba of Italian descent, Bizzarri began his career with Racing Club de Avellaneda in the Argentine Primera División, where his good performances drew attention from La Liga powerhouse Real Madrid, which signed him in 1999. Unsettled and blocked by the emergence of 18-year-old Iker Casillas, he battled for second-choice status with Bodo Illgner, being a used player in the club's victorious campaign in the UEFA Champions League.

In the summer of 2000, Bizzarri was transferred to Real Valladolid, eventually becoming the starter. He did not miss one single league game from 2002 to 2004, but his team would be relegated from the top flight in the latter season.

Bizzarri played for Gimnàstic de Tarragona in 2006–07, in another campaign that ended in top-tier relegation.

=== Italy ===
In June 2007, Bizzarri signed a two-year deal with Italy's Catania, a contract that would be renewed at the end of the season for an equal period. During 2008–09, he became first-choice under new coach Walter Zenga, after spending most of his debut campaign as a reserve behind Ciro Polito. His performances were consistent as the Sicily side retained their league status, and the player's performances also allowed him to be part of Goal.com's weekly "Serie A Team of the Week" more than any other goalkeeper in the competition.

Despite some stellar performances, Bizzarri admitted towards the end of the season he would not be renewing his link with Catania. Following this announcement, manager Zenga opted to drop him to the bench so young Tomáš Košický could gain some experience.

Bizzarri joined fellow top-flight club Lazio in June 2009, on a free transfer. In his first two years, he backed up another South American, Uruguayan Fernando Muslera, as the Rome team ranked 12th in the first (he added four appearances in the UEFA Europa League, winning two, losing two and conceding seven goals).

The 36-year-old Bizzarri moved to ChievoVerona in summer 2014, renewing his contract for two years at the end of the season. On 1 July 2016, he signed a one-year deal with Pescara, which included an automatic one-year renewal in the case of top-division survival.

On 16 July 2018, after a further campaign in the main division with Udinese, Bizzarri joined Serie B club Foggia. In the following transfer window, he was loaned to Perugia also of the latter tier until 30 June.

== International career ==
Although he never earned a cap for Argentina, Bizzarri was part of the nation's final squad at the 1999 Copa América.

== Career statistics ==
Appearances and goals by club, season and competition
Club	Season	League			National Cup		Continental		Other		Total	
Club	Season	Division	Apps	Goals	Apps	Goals	Apps	Goals	Apps	Goals	Apps	Goals
Real Madrid	1999–00	La Liga	7	0	0	0	4 (Note: Appearances in UEFA Champions League)	0	1 (Note: Appearance in Club World Cup)	0	12	0
Valladolid	2000–01	La Liga	26	0	2	0	—		—		28	0
Valladolid	2001–02	La Liga	0	0	6	0	—		—		6	0
Valladolid	2002–03	La Liga	38	0	4	0	—		—		42	0
Valladolid	2003–04	La Liga	38	0	3	0	—		—		41	0
Valladolid	2004–05	Segunda División	39	0	1	0	—		—		40	0
Valladolid	2005–06	Segunda División	33	0	0	0	—		—		33	0
Valladolid	Total		174	0	16	0	—		—		190	0
Gimnàstic	2006–07	La Liga	22	0	0	0	—		—		22	0
Catania	2007–08	Serie A	7	0	0	0	—		—		7	0
Catania	2008–09	Serie A	32	0	2	0	—		—		34	0
Catania	Total		39	0	2	0	—		—		41	0
Lazio	2009–10	Serie A	0	0	0	0	4 (Note: Appearances in UEFA Europa League)	0	0	0	4	0
Lazio	2010–11	Serie A	0	0	0	0	—		—		0	0
Lazio	2011–12	Serie A	7	0	1	0	3	0	—		11	0
Lazio	2012–13	Serie A	5	0	1	0	5	0	—		11	0
Lazio	Total		12	0	2	0	12	0	0	0	26	0
Genoa	2013–14	Serie A	1	0	0	0	—		—		1	0
Chievo	2014–15	Serie A	28	0	0	0	—		—		28	0
Chievo	2015–16	Serie A	35	0	1	0	—		—		36	0
Chievo	Total		63	0	1	0	—		—		64	0
Pescara	2016–17	Serie A	29	0	1	0	—		—		30	0
Udinese	2017–18	Serie A	32	0	0	0	—		—		32	0
Foggia	2018–19	Serie B	17	0	0	0	—		—		17	0
Perugia (loan)	2018–19	Serie B	0	0	—		—		0	0	32	0
Career total			396	0	21	0	16	0	1	0	434	0

== Honours ==
Real Madrid

- UEFA Champions League: 1999–2000

Lazio

- Coppa Italia: 2012–13
- Supercoppa Italiana: 2009
