= 2009 Supercoppa Italiana =

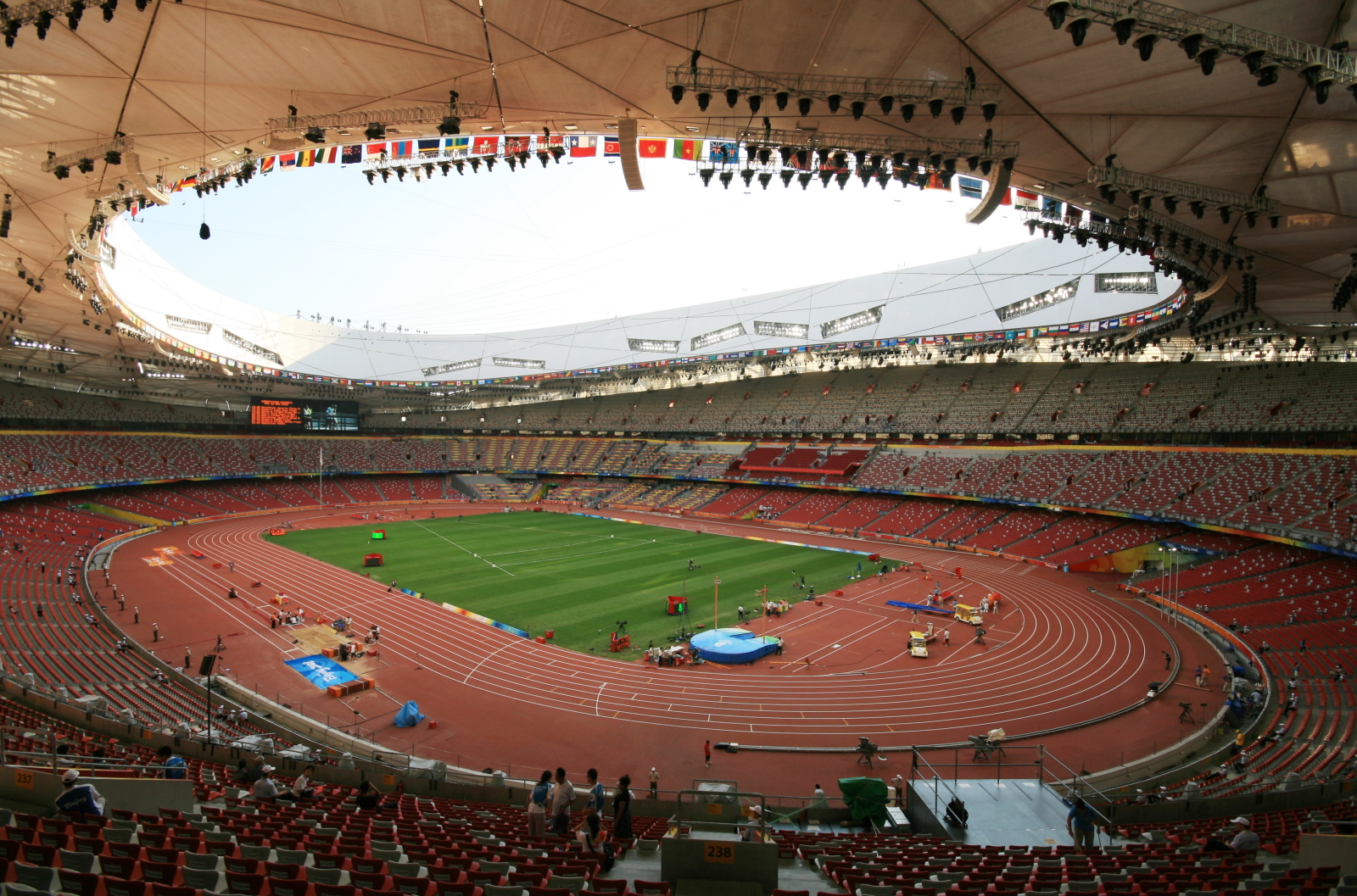
Inter Milan	Lazio
1	2
- Date: 8 August 2009
- Venue: Beijing National Stadium, Beijing
- Referee: Emidio Morganti
- Attendance: 68,961
- Weather: Mist; 25 °C (77 °F)

The 2009 Supercoppa Italiana was a match played by the 2008–09 Serie A winners Inter Milan and 2008–09 Coppa Italia winners Lazio. It took place on 8 August 2009 at the Beijing National Stadium in Beijing, China. Lazio won the match 2–1 to earn their third Supercoppa title. This edition was the first time the Supercoppa Italiana was held in China, with China becoming the fourth country to host the competition.

== Match details ==
8 August 2009
20:30 CST

Inter Milan	1–2	Lazio
Eto'o 77'	Report	Matuzalém 63'; Rocchi 66'

Beijing National Stadium, Beijing, China
Attendance: 68,961
Referee: Emidio Morganti

Inter Milan	Lazio

INTERNAZIONALE:
GK	12	(Brazil) Júlio César
RB	13	(Brazil) Maicon	(yellow card) 89'
CB	6	(Brazil) Lúcio
CB	26	(Romania) Cristian Chivu	(yellow card) 89'
LB	4	(Argentina) Javier Zanetti (c)
DM	19	(Argentina) Esteban Cambiasso
CM	11	(Ghana) Sulley Muntari	(yellow card) 29'	(substituted off) 84'
CM	8	(Brazil) Thiago Motta		(substituted off) 70'
AM	5	(Serbia) Dejan Stanković		(substituted off) 70'
CF	9	(Cameroon) Samuel Eto'o
CF	22	(Argentina) Diego Milito
Substitutes:
GK	1	(Italy) Francesco Toldo
DF	2	(Colombia) Iván Córdoba
DF	16	(Argentina) Nicolás Burdisso
DF	39	(Italy) Davide Santon
MF	14	(France) Patrick Vieira		(substituted in) 70'
FW	18	(Honduras) David Suazo		(substituted in) 84'
FW	45	(Italy) Mario Balotelli		(substituted in) 70'
Manager:
(Portugal) José Mourinho

LAZIO:
GK	86	(Uruguay) Fernando Muslera
RB	2	(Switzerland) Stephan Lichtsteiner
CB	87	(France) Modibo Diakité
CB	13	(Italy) Sebastiano Siviglia
LB	11	(Serbia) Aleksandar Kolarov
DM	33	(Italy) Roberto Baronio		(substituted off) 53'
CM	32	(Italy) Cristian Brocchi
CM	5	(Italy) Stefano Mauri
AM	8	(Brazil) Matuzalém	(yellow card) 30'	(substituted off) 81'
SS	10	(Argentina) Mauro Zárate
CF	9	(Italy) Tommaso Rocchi (c)		(substituted off) 72'
Substitutes:
GK	1	(Argentina) Albano Bizzarri
DF	25	(Brazil) Emílson Cribari		(substituted in) 81'
DF	26	(Romania) Ștefan Radu
MF	6	(France) Ousmane Dabo		(substituted in) 53'
MF	7	(Portugal) Eliseu
MF	17	(Italy) Pasquale Foggia
FW	74	(Argentina) Julio Cruz		(substituted in) 72'
Manager:
(Italy) Davide Ballardini

Supercoppa Italiana
2009 Winners
Lazio
Third title

MATCH OFFICIALS

- Assistant referees: Niccolai, Papi
- Fourth official: Orsato

MATCH RULES

- 90 minutes.
- 30 minutes of extra-time if necessary.
- Penalty shoot-out if scores still level.
- Seven named substitutes
- Maximum of 3 substitutions.

== Ticket sales ==
By 15 July 2009, approximately half the 70,000 tickets for the match had been sold.
By mid-noon of 6 August 2009, 56,780 tickets had been sold.
Approximately two hours before the commencement of the match, 68,961 tickets had been sold.

== Others ==
Because the matchday marked the one-year anniversary of the 2008 Beijing Olympics, the organization invited 100 Chinese Olympic gold medallists to attend the match.

== See also ==
- 2009–10 Inter Milan season
- 2009–10 SS Lazio season
