= Simone Del Nero =

Italian footballer

Personal information
- Full name: Simone Del Nero
- Date of birth: 4 August 1981 (age 45)
- Place of birth: Carrara, Italy
- Height: 1.84 m (6 ft 0 in)
- Position: Left winger

Team information
- Current team: Lavagnese (head of youth)

Youth career
- Empoli

Senior career*
Years	Team	Apps	(Gls)
1998–2000	Empoli	4	(0)
2000–2007	Brescia	105	(7)
2001–2002	→ Livingston (loan)	1	(0)
2003	→ Palermo (loan)		
2007–2012	Lazio	22	(0)
2012	→ Cesena (loan)	11	(2)
2013	Johor Darul Ta'zim	8	(2)
2013–2016	Massese	45	(16)
2016–2017	Carrarese	19	(4)
2017–2018	Massese	7	(4)
2018–2022	Rivasamba	?	(?)

International career
2003–2004	Italy U21	13	(0)
Medal record
Men's association football
Representing Italy
Olympic Games
Bronze medal – third place	2004	Team competition
UEFA European Under-21 Championship
Winner	2004
- * Club domestic league appearances and goals

Simone Del Nero Cavaliere OMRI (born 4 August 1981) is an Italian former professional footballer who played as a left winger.

== Club career ==
Born in Carrara, Massa-Carrara, Del Nero grew up in the youth system of Empoli. He played just four senior games in two years for the Tuscans before moving to Brescia. Upon joining the Rondinelle, Del Nero at first played with the youth team, developing as a player under the guidance of youth coach and former professional, Luciano De Paola.

Del Nero made fleeting appearances for the senior side, before a disappointing stint on loan with Scottish outfit Livingston. He returned to Brescia for the 2002–03 season, where he made three appearances before another loan spell, this time to Sicily with Palermo, at the time in Serie B. However, Del Nero did not play a game with the rosanero and returned north at the season's end.

Del Nero had a breakout year in 2003–04, the first in which he established himself as a regular and consistently played in the senior side. In 2004–05, he remained a regular, but did not manage to save his team from relegation.

Del Nero was noted as a talented young player at Brescia with his former coach, Mario Somma. He remained a regular under Rolando Maran and Zdeněk Zeman in his last two years at the club, 2005–06 and 2006–07, both of which were spent in Serie B.

In the summer of 2007, Del Nero was available on a free transfer as he was out-of-contract at Brescia and was quickly signed to a five-year deal by giants Lazio, who were preparing for a return to the UEFA Champions League, having just finished third in Serie A.

Lazio were drawn to face Romanian champions Dinamo București in the Champions League qualifiers and, in the second leg, Del Nero proved decisive. Having only managed a 1–1 draw in Rome, the biancocelesti travelled to Bucharest needing a win and Del Nero won an early penalty for the first goal before setting up the second, with Lazio going on to win 3–1 and qualify for the group stage. Unfortunately for the Ligurian, he did not take any part in the group phase, and only managed five Serie A appearances due to injury. At the end of the 2007–08 season, Del Nero underwent an operation in Finland for plantar fasciitis.

That surgery had kept him out for much of the 2008–09 season as well, but he made a return to action on 14 December 2008, playing the first half of Lazio's draw against Udinese. Del Nero went on to make a handful more appearances towards the end of the season, including a substitute appearance in the 2009 Coppa Italia Final, which Lazio won on penalties. The Coppa was Del Nero's first title with the Roman club.

He joined Malaysia Super League club, Johor Darul Ta'zim in 2013. He bagged his first goal in 2013 Malaysia Super League when Johor Darul Ta'zim draw 2–2 against LionsXII at Tan Sri Dato Haji Hassan Yunos Stadium on 19 February 2013. Fitness and injury problems restricted his playing time at Johor, affecting his performance on the pitch, and he rejected an offer to be loaned to sister club Johor FA, resulting in the end of his spell in Johor. On 6 April 2013, together with fellow import player Dani Guiza, they played their last game for Johor Darul Ta'zim in a Malaysia FA Cup semi final first leg match, which ended in 2–3 defeat to Selangor FA.

Del Nero joined Serie D club Massese in the end of 2013.

On 30 July 2016, he was sent on loan to Carrarese for the 2016–17 season, along with fellow striker Gennaro Tutino, who arrived from Napoli.

== International career ==
Del Nero was a part of the Italy national U-21 side that was victorious at the 2004 UEFA European Under-21 Championship and also won a bronze medal with the Italian Olympic team at the 2004 Summer Olympics.

== Coaching career ==
Del Nero was appointed as head of youth at Lavagnese in 2022.

== Honours ==
Lazio

- Coppa Italia: 2008–09
- Supercoppa Italiana: 2009

Italy

- UEFA European Under-21 Championship: 2004
- Olympic bronze medal: 2004 Summer Olympics

Orders

- 5th Class / Knight: Cavaliere Ordine al Merito della Repubblica Italiana: 2004
