= Riccardo Perpetuini =

Italian footballer

Personal information
- Full name: Riccardo Perpetuini
- Date of birth: 4 August 1990 (age 36)
- Place of birth: Latina, Italy
- Height: 1.79 m (5 ft 10 1/2 in)
- Positions: Midfielder; left back

Youth career
- Lazio

Senior career*
Years	Team	Apps	(Gls)
2008–2015	Lazio	3	(0)
2010–2011	→ Crotone (loan)	9	(0)
2011–2012	→ Foggia (loan)	21	(0)
2012–2014	→ Salernitana (loan)	52	(6)
2014–2015	→ L'Aquila (loan)	10	(0)
2015–2016	Cremonese	14	(0)
2016	Mantova	12	(0)

International career^{‡}
2010	Italy U20	6	(0)
- * Club domestic league appearances and goals as of 6 June 2012 ‡ National team caps and goals as of 6 June 2012

Riccardo Perpetuini (born 4 August 1990 in Latina, Italy) is an Italian retired footballer.

== Club career ==
=== Lazio ===
A native of Cisterna di Latina, just south of Rome, Perpetuini came through the successful youth academy at Lazio. He made his Serie A debut on 17 May 2009, coming on as a 69th-minute substitute for Ousmane Dabo in a 2–0 loss to Palermo at the Renzo Barbera.

He also played as left-back in 2009–10 season.

He retired in 2016 to start a career as a dentist.
