= Matuzalém =

Brazilian footballer (born 1980)

Matuzálém
Personal information
- Full name: Matuzalém Francelino da Silva
- Date of birth: 10 June 1980 (age 46)
- Place of birth: Natal, Brazil
- Height: 1.75 m (5 ft 9 in)
- Position: Midfielder

Senior career*
Years	Team	Apps	(Gls)
1997–1999	Vitória	14	(0)
1999	Bellinzona	0	(0)
1999–2001	Napoli	52	(2)
2001–2002	Piacenza	28	(3)
2002–2003	Parma	0	(0)
2002–2003	→ Brescia (loan)	30	(0)
2003–2004	Brescia	30	(3)
2004–2007	Shakhtar Donetsk	68	(25)
2007–2008	Zaragoza	14	(1)
2008–2013	Lazio	75	(2)
2013–2014	Genoa	36	(1)
2014–2015	Bologna	34	(0)
2015–2016	Hellas Verona	7	(0)
2016	Miami FC	3	(0)
2017–2018	Nuova Monterosi	28	(3)
Total		419	(40)

International career
1997	Brazil U17	6	(3)
1999	Brazil U20	4	(1)
- * Club domestic league appearances and goals

Matuzalém Francelino da Silva (born 10 June 1980), commonly known as just Matuzalém, is a Brazilian football manager and former player, who played as a midfielder.

== Club career ==
=== Early career ===
Matuzalém began his career at Salvador-based Vitória and quickly established his place in lower level of the Brazil national team. Described as a "goalscoring midfielder" by Eurosport, he first emerged in the 1997 FIFA World Youth Championship in Egypt. There, he scored three goals in six games, including a critical goal in the final match.

=== Napoli ===
In 1999, Matuzalém left Vitória to join Napoli in Italy, via Parma, in a temporary deal, where he remained for two seasons, the first was spent in Serie B – during which he helped the team win promotion to the Italian top flight – and the second season in Serie A, in what would be Napoli's last in season in the Italian top flight for six years. The club signed Matuzalém in a co-ownership deal for 5 billion lire in the summer of 2000. Matuzalém was a regular starter at Napoli, but only scored twice in 52 appearances during his tenure in Naples.

=== Piacenza and Brescia ===
Following his Napoli spell, Matuzalém was bought back by Parma, subsequently reselling half of his rights to Piacenza in another co-ownership deal in the summer of 2001, for 6 billion Lire (€3,098,741).) Matuzalém stayed at Piacenza alongside Amauri, Nicola Mora and Matteo Guardalben, all of which were also partly owned by Parma.

With Piacenza during 2001–02 season, the team finished 14th in the league. In the opening round of the season, Matuzalém became the first foreigner to score for Piacenza in Serie A. In June 2002, Parma reacquired all of his rights again.

The second season of the loan spell saw Matuzalém switch to Brescia on loan, where he had the opportunity to play alongside Roberto Baggio. He played nearly every match and the deal was made permanent at the end of the season. However, he only lasted one more year at the club, before Ukrainian giants Shakhtar Donetsk signed him in 2004.

=== Shakhtar Donetsk ===
In June 2004, Shakhtar Donetsk signed Matuzalém from Brescia, paying Brescia €8,000,000, Matuzalém's agents €3,750,000 and €221,092 to Matuzalém's former clubs as solidarity contribution. It was a Ukrainian record at the time. After the transfer of Anatoliy Tymoschuk to Zenit Saint Petersburg, he became the new captain of the club for the 2006–07 season and was voted the club's Player of the Year. During his three seasons with the club, he won two league titles and scored 25 goals in 68 appearances.

On 1 July 2007, Palermo made an offer of US$7,000,000 for Matuzalém, but it was rejected.

=== Real Zaragoza and breach of contract saga ===
On 2 July 2007, Matuzalém notified in writing Shakhtar of the fact that he unilaterally terminated their contractual relationship with immediate effect. On 5 July, Shakhtar replied Matuzalém and/or his new club should pay the sum in the release clause of €25 million, or Shakhtar would start legal action. The actual phrasing in the contract, however, stated that Shakhtar would be under an obligation to release him if the new club offered to pay that amount. It was not, strictly speaking, a penalty clause.

On 18 July, however, he was presented as Real Zaragoza's newest signing. Shakhtar informed Zaragoza to request the club to pay the fee. After played four games and scoring once, Matuzalém was reported injured since September 2007 and returned in March 2008. During his only season with the club, he featured scarcely, due to a ligament injury he sustained in September 2007; in total, he obtained 14 appearances, scoring a single goal in La Liga. Zaragoza were relegated at the end of the season.

Matuzalém's case was considered by FIFA Dispute Resolution Chamber (DRC) on 2 November 2007, which ruled Matuzalém and Zaragoza jointly and severally liable, ordering payment of €6,800,000 to Shakhtar. On 19 March 2008, however, Shakhtar appealed to the Court of Arbitration for Sport (CAS), as the club perceived the fee set by FIFA DRC as too low. On 20 March, Matuzalém and Zaragoza also made an appeal to CAS for the compensation. On 19 May 2009, the CAS ordered Matuzalém to pay €11,858,934 to Shakhtar for breach of contract. The decision was upheld by the Swiss Federal Tribunal. Zaragoza also later paid €500,000 to Shakhtar on 1 September 2010.

Neither Matuzalém or Zaragoza were able to pay the ordered compensation. For this reason, further sanctions, including banning Matuzalém from all football-related activities, were imposed by FIFA on 31 August 2010. This FIFA decision was appealed to the CAS but was rejected on 29 June 2011. The CAS decision was appealed to the Swiss Federal Tribunal. In its decision rendered on 27 March 2012, the Swiss Federal Tribunal annulled the CAS decision, as they found the ban on Matuzalém "a severe infringement of [his] right to privacy". The Tribunal also questioned whether the sanction was likely to lead to the payment of the compensation, which was the stated purpose of the ban. The compensation to be paid to Shakhtar was not affected by this case. This remains the only case where a CAS decision has been overturned based on the merits of the case.

=== Lazio ===
In July 2008, Matuzalém returned to Italy after four years, joining Lazio on a season-long loan with an option to buy at the end of the season for €13 million (plus VAT). Injuries plagued his season, though when fit he established a place for himself in the centre of the Lazio midfield alongside Cristian Ledesma. He claimed some silverware as Lazio won their fifth Coppa Italia, however a booking in the semi-final against Juventus meant he missed the final victory against Sampdoria. At the end of the season, Lazio exercised the option to keep him on a permanent basis, but for €5,310,000 on a five-year contract.

In the 2009 Supercoppa Italiana, he scored the opening goal in an eventual 2–1 victory over Inter.

On 14 March 2010, Matuzalém was injured and missed the remainder of the season. He became a backup of Ledesma and Cristian Brocchi in next season.

=== Genoa ===
On 3 January 2013, Matuzalém was signed by Genoa on a temporary deal. On 24 August 2013 Matuzalém formally joined Genoa on free transfer in two-year contract.

=== Bologna ===
On 4 July 2014, Matuzalém was signed by Serie B club Bologna in another free transfer. He was assigned number 5 shirt.

=== Hellas Verona ===
On 19 September 2015, Matuzalém signed with Serie A side Hellas Verona. His contract with Verona was terminated on 8 January 2016. In January 2016, however, Matuzalém and Verona mutually agreed to cancel his contract with the club, after only five months with the team.

=== Miami FC ===
Matuzalém signed with Miami FC of the North American Soccer League (NASL) on 20 January 2016. He was released on 12 May 2016.

=== Monterosi ===
Following his spell in the United States, Matuzalém returned to Italy and was assigned by Nuova Monterosi in December 2016, a Serie D team based in Lazio, who were playing in group G at the time. He retired from professional football in June 2018 in order to pursue a coaching career.

On 27 September, he obtained his UEFA A coaching licence, which allows him to serve as a head coach of youth teams and Serie C teams, or as an assistant coach for Serie B and Serie A sides.

== International career ==
Although he was never capped for Brazil at senior level, Matuzalém represented Brazil at youth level, playing alongside Ronaldinho. He was a member of the Brazil U17 team that won the 1997 FIFA U-17 World Championship in Brazil, and also took part at the 1999 FIFA World Youth Championship with the U20 side; in the former tournament, he played a key role in his team's success, scoring three goals in six games, including the decisive goal in the final victory.

== Style of play ==
Described as a "classic playmaker" in the Italian media, Matuzalém is an energetic offensive–minded midfielder, known in particular for his passing, creativity, and technique, as well as his tactical intelligence, which earned him the nickname "The Professor". A diminutive and hard-working left–footed player, with a slender build and significant stamina, his usual position is that of a central midfielder, although he is also capable of playing as an attacking midfielder, due to his eye for goal from midfield, or as a left–sided midfielder; he has also been deployed as a defensive midfielder, a position in which he usually functioned as a deep-lying playmaker. Despite his ability, he also earned a reputation for being overly aggressive, due to his physical and tenacious playing style, and for lacking discipline on the pitch; during his time in Italy, he earned 11 red cards between Serie A and Serie B. He earned the name Matuzalém due to his maturity and precocious performances as a youngster.

== Personal life ==
Matuzalém was hospitalised in Viterbo in March 2019, after being found in a confused state.

== Honours ==
Shakhtar Donetsk

- Ukrainian Premier League: 2004–05, 2005–06

Lazio

- Coppa Italia: 2008–09
- Supercoppa Italiana: 2009

Vitória

- Campeonato do Nordeste: 1997, 1999

Brazil U17

- FIFA U-17 World Cup: 1997
