= 2008–09 Coppa Italia =

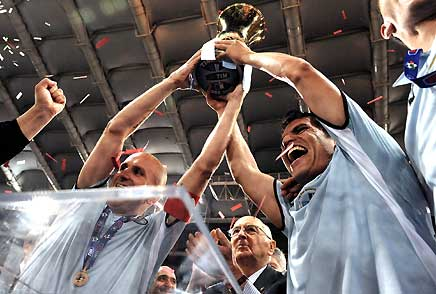
- President Giorgio Napolitano at the center of the photo, after presenting the trophy to Rocchi and Ledesma, welcomes the victory for Lazio after the Cup final in Italy

Tournament details
- Country: Italy
- Dates: 9 Aug 2008 – 13 May 2009
- Teams: 78

Final positions
- Champions: Lazio (5th title)
- Runners-up: Sampdoria

Tournament statistics
- Matches played: 79
- Goals scored: 233 (2.95 per match)
- Top goal scorer: Goran Pandev (6 goals)

The 2008–09 Coppa Italia, also known as TIM Cup for sponsorship reasons, was the 62nd edition of the domestic tournament. The competition started on 9 August 2008 and ended on 13 May 2009. The radically different format used in the 2007–08 Coppa was abandoned, with the new format more closely resembling earlier editions of the tournament.

The final was played between Lazio and Sampdoria. The match ended with Lazio winning 6–5 on penalties. The first 90 minutes ended in a 1–1 draw, and no goals were scored in extra time. It was Lazio's fifth Coppa Italia title, after having last won in the 2003–04 edition. With the win, Lazio earned a spot in the play-off round of the 2009–10 UEFA Europa League.

== Format ==
In the previous year, the number of teams participating was reduced to only 42: the teams in Serie A and Serie B. For 2008–09, that number was expanded to 78 with the addition of 18 clubs from Lega Pro Prima Divisione (formerly Serie C1), nine clubs from Lega Pro Seconda Divisione (formerly Serie C2) and nine clubs from Serie D. Also, except for the semifinals, all rounds were one-leg fixtures. The one-game final played at the Stadio Olimpico in Rome, which was first adopted in 2007–08, remained.

- First phase: one-leg fixtures
  - First round: 18 clubs from Lega Pro Prima Divisione, 9 clubs from Lega Pro Seconda Divisione and 9 clubs from Serie D were paired
  - Second round: All 22 clubs from Serie B were added to the 18 winners of the first round
  - Third round: Clubs 9–20 from Serie A were added to the 20 winners of the second round
  - Fourth round: 16 winners of the third round were paired
- Second phase: one-leg fixtures (except semifinals)
  - Round of 16: Teams 1–8 from Serie A were paired with the 8 winners of the fourth round
  - Quarterfinals
  - Semifinals: two-leg fixtures
- Final: one-leg fixture at the Stadio Olimpico in Rome

Throughout the tournament, home stadium advantage was given to the projected higher seed (i.e., assuming no upsets). In the two-leg semifinals, the projected higher seed played the second leg at home.

== Participating teams ==
Key
Serie A
Serie B
Serie C1
Serie C2
Serie D

Round of 16
Internazionale	Roma	Juventus	Fiorentina
Milan	Sampdoria	Udinese	Napoli
Third round
Atalanta	Genoa	Palermo	Lazio
Siena	Cagliari	Torino	Reggina
Catania	Chievo	Bologna	Lecce
Second round
Empoli	Parma	Livorno	AlbinoLeffe
Brescia	Pisa	Rimini	Ascoli
Mantova	Frosinone	Bari	Triestina
Grosseto	Piacenza	Modena	Vicenza
Treviso	Avellino	Sassuolo	Salernitana
Cittadella	Ancona		
First round
Ravenna	Cesena	Cremonese	Foligno
Crotone	Taranto	Foggia	Perugia
Padova	Pescara	Legnano	Arezzo
Monza	Novara	Gallipoli	Cavese
Sorrento	Pro Sesto	Pergocrema	Reggiana
Benevento	Bassano Virtus	Portogruaro	Real Marcianise
Lumezzane	Mezzocorona	Celano	Biellese
Tritium	Chioggia	Renato Curi	Castelsardo
Barletta	Sibilla Flegrea	Castellarano	Pontedera

Due to financial problems and other sanctions, the list of 78 teams was filled as follows:

- Serie A – all 20 teams
- Serie B – limited to 20 teams
  - Messina, which finished 14th in 2007–08, and La Spezia, which finished 21st, were left off due to financial difficulties
- Lega Pro Prima Divisione – number of teams participating increased from 18 to 20
  - top 10 teams from Girone C1/A and Girone C1/B based on 2007–08 standings were selected to enter
  - Lucchese, which finished 8th in Girone C1/B were omitted
  - Pro Sesto, which finished 11th in Girone C1/A with 43 points were selected. The 11th-placed team in C1/B had 40 points
- Lega Pro Seconda Divisione – 9 teams selected
  - all three division champions from Girone C2/A, C2/B and C2/C
  - both playoff finalists from each of the three divisions, a total of six teams
- Serie D – 9 teams selected
  - all second-placed teams from each of the nine divisions, except for Girone D and Girone E where the third-placed teams were selected
  - both Montichiari which finished second in Girone D, and Colligiana which finished second in Girone E, were promoted to Lega Pro Seconda Divisione

== Bracket ==
=== Elimination rounds ===
==== Section 1 ====
First Round
Gallipoli	3
Sibilla Flegrea	2
Ravenna	5
Castellarano	1

Second Round
Mantova	1
Gallipoli	0
Rimini	3(2)
Ravenna	3(4)

Third Round
Genoa	3
Mantova	1
Palermo	1
Ravenna	2

Fourth Round
Genoa	2
Ravenna	1

===== Match details =====
====== First round ======
9 August 2008
20:45

Gallipoli	3–2	Sibilla Flegrea
Russo 25'; Di Gennaro 30'; Russo 50'		Dinolfo 4'; Avolio 88'

Stadio Via del Mare, Lecce

9 August 2008
20:45

Ravenna	5–1	Castellarano
Filipi 25'; Cavagna 41'; Gerbino 43'; Pettinari 48'; Succi 47'		Mayer 90+4'

Stadio Bruno Benelli, Ravenna

====== Second round ======
17 August 2008
20:30

Mantova	1–0	Gallipoli
Godeas 8'

Stadio Danilo Martelli, Mantua

17 August 2008
20:45

Rimini	3–3	Ravenna
Docente 17'; Basha 44'; Regonesi 84'	Report	Gerbino 18'; Succi 73'; Sciaccaluga 83'
Penalties
Regonesi (penalty scored); Ricchiuti (penalty missed); La Camera (penalty scored); Basha (penalty missed)	2–4	(penalty scored) Succi; (penalty scored) Agliard; (penalty scored) Pettinari; (penalty scored) Ciuffetelli

Stadio Romeo Neri, Rimini

====== Third round ======
24 August 2008
16:00

Genoa	3–1	Mantova
Olivera 19', 44'; Milanetto 77'		Passoni 90'

Stadio Luigi Ferraris, Genoa

23 August 2008
20:30

Palermo	1–2	Ravenna
Cavani 82'		Succi 11', 72'

Stadio Renzo Barbera, Palermo

====== Fourth round ======
2 October 2008
18:00

Genoa	2–1	Ravenna
Milito 82', 90'		Pettinari 58'

Stadio Luigi Ferraris, Genoa

==== Section 2 ====
First Round
Monza	1(4)
Celano	1(3)
Perugia	1
Lumezzane	0
Taranto	1
Bassano Virtus	2

Second Round
Vicenza	3
Monza	0
Ascoli	3
Perugia	1
Bari	2
Bassano Virtus	0

Third Round
Bologna	2
Vicenza	0
Ascoli	1
Bari	0

Fourth Round
Bologna	1
Ascoli	0

===== Match details =====
====== First round ======
9 August 2008
20:45

Monza	1–1	Celano
Cesaretti 7'		Negro 57'
Penalties
Puleo (penalty scored); Capocchiano (penalty scored); Bolzan (penalty scored); Grammauta (penalty scored)	4–3	(penalty missed) Negro; (penalty scored) Villa; (penalty scored) Barbetti; (penalty scored) Fanelli; (penalty missed) Giunchi

Stadio Brianteo, Monza

9 August 2008
20:45

Perugia	1–0	Lumezzane
Cutolo 45+4'

Stadio Renato Curi, Perugia

10 August 2008
17:00

Taranto	1–2	Bassano Virtus
Prosperi 8'		Zubin 46'; Cesca 52'

Stadio Erasmo Iacovone, Taranto

====== Second round ======
17 August 2008
20:45

Vicenza	3–0	Monza
Bjelanović 10', 53'; Sgrigna 61'

Stadio Romeo Menti, Vicenza

17 August 2008
20:45

Ascoli	3–1	Perugia
Job 23'; Soncin 27'; Luci 70'		Cutolo 61'

Stadio Cino e Lillo Del Duca, Ascoli Piceno

16 August 2008
20:45

Bari	2–0	Bassano Virtus
Barreto 71' (pen.), 74'

Stadio San Nicola, Bari

====== Third round ======
23 August 2008
20:45

Bologna	2–0	Vicenza
Di Vaio 79'; Adaílton 88'

Stadio Renato Dall'Ara, Bologna

23 August 2008
20:45

Ascoli	1–0	Bari
Pesce 66'

Stadio Cino e Lillo Del Duca, Ascoli Piceno

====== Fourth round ======
1 October 2008
15:00

Bologna	1–0	Ascoli
Coelho 84'

Stadio Renato Dall'Ara, Bologna

==== Section 3 ====
First Round
Pescara	2
Mezzocorona	0

Second Round
AlbinoLeffe	2(6)
Pescara	2(5)
Pisa	1
Cittadella	2
Empoli	2
Ancona	0

Third Round
Siena	4
AlbinoLeffe	0
Cittadella	0
Empoli	1

Fourth Round
Siena	0
Empoli	2

===== Match details =====
====== First round ======
9 August 2008
20:00

Pescara	0–2	Mezzocorona
Cardinale 50'; Bazzani 84'

Stadio Adriatico, Pescara

====== Second round ======
16 August 2008
20:00

AlbinoLeffe	2–2	Pescara
Ruopolo 10'; Colacone 82'	Report	Ferraresi 6'; Zeytulaev 50'
Penalties
Colacone (penalty scored); Carobbio (penalty scored); Ruopolo (penalty scored); Ferrari (penalty scored); Gervasoni (penalty scored); Renzetti (penalty scored)	6–5	(penalty scored) Pisciotta; (penalty scored) Zeytulaev; (penalty scored) Irineu; (penalty scored) Vitale; (penalty scored) Cardinale; (penalty missed) De Matteis

Stadio Atleti Azzurri d'Italia, Bergamo

17 August 2008
20:30

Pisa	1–2	Cittadella
Colombo 58'		Rossi 66'; Oliveira 90'

Arena Garibaldi – Stadio Romeo Anconetani, Pisa

17 August 2008
20:30

Empoli	2–0	Ancona
Lodi 10' (pen.); Negrini 29'

Stadio Carlo Castellani, Empoli

====== Third round ======
23 August 2008
15:00

Siena	4–0	AlbinoLeffe
Calaiò 6'; Portanova 50'; Kharja 68'; Maccarone 81'

Stadio Artemio Franchi, Siena

23 August 2008
17:30

Cittadella	0–1	Empoli
		Lodi 88'

Stadio Pier Cesare Tombolato, Cittadella

====== Fourth round ======
17 September 2008
18:30

Siena	0–2	Empoli
		Lodi 76' (pen.), 90'

Stadio Artemio Franchi, Siena

==== Section 4 ====
First Round
Cavese	3
Biellese	1
Sorrento	3
Castelsardo	1

Second Round
Grosseto	4
Cavese	2
Triestina	2
Sorrento	1

Third Round
Reggina	3
Grosseto	0
Cagliari	1
Triestina	0

Fourth Round
Reggina	4
Cagliari	0

===== Match details =====
====== First round ======
10 August 2008
20:30

Cavese	3–1	Biellese
Tarantino 38'; Schetter 53'; Shiba 80'		Bigatti 78' (pen.)

Stadio Simonetta Lamberti, Cava de' Tirreni

9 August 2008
17:30

Sorrento	3–1	Castelsardo
Ripa 9'; Virtanen 82'; Caccavallo 90+4'		Tribuna 6'

Stadio Italia, Sorrento

====== Second round ======
17 August 2008
20:30

Grosseto	4–2	Cavese
Sansovini 2'; Sforzini 12', 74'; Mora 90'		Tarantino 31'; Schetter 82'

Stadio Olimpico Carlo Zecchini, Grosseto

17 August 2008
20:45

Triestina	2–1	Sorrento
Testini 10'; Eliakwu 82'		Giampaolo 90'

Stadio Nereo Rocco, Trieste

====== Third round ======
23 August 2008
20:30

Reggina	3–0	Grosseto
Corradi 45' (pen.); Hallfreðsson 53'; Barillà 59'

Stadio Oreste Granillo, Reggio Calabria

23 August 2008
20:30

Cagliari	1–0	Triestina
Matri 78' (pen.)

Stadio Sant'Elia, Cagliari

====== Fourth round ======
17 September 2008
21:00

Reggina	4–0	Cagliari
Ceravolo 52', 74'; Brienza 70', 89'

Stadio Oreste Granillo, Reggio Calabria

==== Section 5 ====
First Round
Legnano	1
Benevento	3
Pro Sesto	2
Tritium	0

Second Round
Treviso	2(6)
Benevento	2(7)
Modena	1
Pro Sesto	0

Third Round
Lazio	5
Benevento	1
Atalanta	2
Modena	1

Fourth Round
Lazio	2
Atalanta	0

===== Match details =====
====== First round ======
9 August 2008
17:00

Legnano	1–3	Benevento
Virdis 21'		Evacuo 31'; Cinelli 53'; Imbriani 90+1'

Stadio Giovanni Mari, Legnano
Referee: Riccardo Colasanti

10 August 2008
20:30

Pro Sesto	2–0	Tritium
Beretta 41'; Fracassetti 80'

Stadio Breda, Sesto San Giovanni
Referee: Gesuele Paparazzo

====== Second round ======
17 August 2008
20:30

Treviso	2–2	Benevento
Beghetto 10' (pen.); Smit 73'		Evacuo 14', 81'
Penalties
	6–7

Stadio Omobono Tenni, Treviso
Referee: Renzo Candussio

17 August 2008
20:30

Modena	1–0	Pro Sesto
Troiano 59'

Stadio Alberto Braglia, Modena
Referee: Luca Marelli

====== Third round ======
23 August 2008
20:45

Lazio	5–1	Benevento
Cattaneo 9' (o.g.); Meghni 23'; Manfredini 55'; Pandev 58', 90'		Bueno 49'

Stadio Olimpico, Rome
Referee: Matteo Trefoloni

23 August 2008
15:30

Atalanta	2–1	Modena
Manfredini 32'; Marconi 90'		Bruno 36' (pen.)

Stadio Atleti Azzurri d'Italia, Bergamo
Referee: Nicola Ayroldi

====== Fourth round ======
1 October 2008
20:30

Lazio	2–0	Atalanta
Ledesma 17'; Pandev 84'

Stadio Olimpico, Rome
Referee: Matteo Trefoloni

==== Section 6 ====
First Round
Foligno	3
Pergocrema	2
Crotone	2
Renato Curi	0
Novara	3
Real Marcianise	1

Second Round
Brescia	2
Foligno	1
Frosinone	0
Crotone	2
Livorno	3
Novara	0

Third Round
Torino (aet)	2
Brescia	1
Crotone	0
Livorno	3

Fourth Round
Torino (aet)	3
Livorno	2

===== Match details =====
====== First round ======
9 August 2008
17:00

Foligno	3–2	Pergocrema
de Paula 30'; Noviello 37'; Coresi 45' (pen.)		Tarallo 47'; Andreini 90'

Stadio Enzo Blasone, Foligno
Referee: Davide Massa

9 August 2008
20:30

Crotone	2–0	Renato Curi
Aurelio 51'; Basso 65'

Stadio Ezio Scida, Crotone
Referee: Gennaro Palazzino

9 August 2008
16:00

Novara	3–1	Real Marcianise
Sinigaglia 29', 60'; Rubino 31'		Innocenti 63'

Stadio Silvio Piola, Novara
Referee: Angelo Martino Giancola

====== Second round ======
17 August 2008
20:30

Brescia	2–1	Foligno
Caracciolo 50' (pen.), 87'		De Stefano 53'

Stadio Mario Rigamonti, Brescia
Referee: Daniele Orsato

17 August 2008
20:45

Frosinone	0–2	Crotone
		Cafiero 68'; Russo 90'

Stadio Matusa, Frosinone
Referee: Riccardo Tozzi

17 August 2008
20:45

Livorno	3–0	Novara
Tavano 9'; Diamanti 68'; Volpe 83'

Stadio Armando Picchi, Livorno
Referee: Leonardo Baracani

====== Third round ======
23 August 2008
20:45

Torino	2–1 (a.e.t.)	Brescia
Rosina 63'; Di Michele 105'		Possanzini 35'

Stadio Olimpico Grande Torino, Turin
Referee: Mauro Bergonzi

23 August 2008
20:30

Crotone	0–3	Livorno
		Filippini 27'; Diamanti 49'; Tavano 58'

Stadio Ezio Scida, Crotone
Referee: Maurizio Ciampi

====== Fourth round ======
1 October 2008
20:30

Torino	3–2 (a.e.t.)	Livorno
Corini 8'; Zanetti 45'; Barone 94'		Diamanti 19', 86' (pen.)

Stadio Olimpico Grande Torino, Turin
Referee: Andrea De Marco

==== Section 7 ====
First Round
Cesena	3
Chioggia	1
Foggia	0
Barletta	2
Cremonese	0
Reggiana	3^{1}

Second Round
Salernitana	3
Cesena	1
Barletta	1
Sassuolo	3
Avellino	0
Reggiana	1

Third Round
Lecce	0
Salernitana	1
Sassuolo	1
Reggiana	0

Fourth Round
Salernitana	2(6)
Sassuolo	2(5)

===== Match details =====
====== First round ======
9 August 2008
20:45

Cesena	3–1	Chioggia
Ferretti 41'; Tonucci 48'; Giaccherini 90+4'		Rizzi 4'

Stadio Dino Manuzzi, Cesena
Referee: Emiliano Gallione

9 August 2008
20:00

Foggia	0–2	Barletta
		Romano 36'; Zotti 69'

Stadio Pino Zaccheria, Foggia
Referee: Nicola Stefanini

9 August 2008
20:30

Cremonese	0–3 ^{1}	Reggiana
	(originally 1 – 0, but Cremonese fielded suspended player)

Referee: Piero Giacomelli

====== Second round ======
17 August 2008
21:00

Salernitana	3–1	Cesena
Tricarico 3'; Ciarciá 21'; Fava 90'		Tonucci 4'

Stadio Arechi, Salerno
Referee: Domenico Celi

17 August 2008
17:00

Barletta	1–3	Sassuolo
Romano 65'		Salvetti 16'; Erpen 30'; Rea 85'

Stadio Cosimo Puttilli, Barletta
Referee: Antonio Giannoccaro

20 August 2008
20:30

Avellino	0–1	Reggiana
		Stefani 60'

Stadio Partenio, Avellino
Referee: Antonio Damato

====== Third round ======
23 August 2008
18:30

Lecce	0–1	Salernitana
		Di Napoli 66'

Stadio Via del Mare, Lecce
Referee: Paolo Valeri

24 August 2008
17:00

Sassuolo	1–0	Reggiana
Salvetti 80'

Stadio Alberto Braglia, Modena
Referee: Luca Banti

====== Fourth round ======
30 September
20:30

Salernitana	2–2	Sassuolo
Marchese 46'; Kyriazis 83'	Report	Selva 14', 60'
Penalties
Marchese (penalty scored); Scarpa (penalty scored); Giannone (penalty scored); Fava (penalty scored); Kyriazis (penalty scored); Turienzo (penalty scored)	6–5	(penalty scored) Poli; (penalty scored) Erpen; (penalty scored) Bastrini; (penalty scored) Malpighi; (penalty scored) Filkor; (penalty missed) Pagani

Stadio Arechi, Salerno
Referee: Paolo Valeri

==== Section 8 ====
First Round
Arezzo	1
Portogruaro	4
Padova	8
Pontedera	0

Second Round
Parma (aet)	3
Portogruaro	2
Piacenza	0
Padova	1

Third Round
Catania (aet)	2
Parma	1
Chievo	1
Padova	2

Fourth Round
Catania	4
Padova	0

^{1} The match was played and Cremonese won by a score of 1–0, but were later disqualified for using a player who should have been under suspension. Reggiana was awarded a 3–0 victory as a result.

===== Match details =====
====== First round ======
9 August 2008
20:30

Arezzo	1–4	Portogruaro
Bondi 42'		Cunico 3' (pen.); Carboni 56'; William 89'; Levacovich 90+2'

Stadio Città di Arezzo, Arezzo

9 August 2008
20:30

Padova	8–0	Pontedera
Varricchio 3', 52', 77'; Rabito 25', 75'; Baù 41'; Malventi 54' (o.g.); Cotroneo 58'

Stadio Euganeo, Padua

====== Second round ======
16 August 2008
20:30

Parma	3–2 (a.e.t.)	Portogruaro
Paci 72'; Morrone 90'; Paponi 91'		Cunico 35'; Maniero 65'

Stadio Ennio Tardini, Parma

17 August 2008
18:00

Piacenza	0–1	Padova
		Troiano 59'

Stadio Leonardo Garilli, Piacenza

====== Third round ======
23 August 2008
20:30

Catania	2–1 (a.e.t.)	Parma
Paolucci 105', 108'		Troest 110'

Stadio Angelo Massimino, Catania

23 August 2008
20:30

Chievo	1–2	Padova
Pellissier 57'		Varricchio 16', 76'

Stadio Marc'Antonio Bentegodi, Verona

====== Fourth round ======
17 September 2008
21:00

Catania	4–0	Padova
Dică 24'; Morimoto 30', 89'; Sabato 62'

Stadio Angelo Massimino, Catania

== Final stage ==
=== Bracket ===
Round of 16
1	Internazionale (aet)	3
Genoa	1
8	Roma	2
Bologna	0
5	Sampdoria	2
Empoli	1
4	Udinese	0(8)
Reggina	0(7)
3	Milan	1
Lazio (aet)	2
6	Fiorentina	0
Torino	1
7	Napoli	3
Salernitana	1
2	Juventus	3
Catania	0

Quarterfinals
Internazionale	2
Roma	1
Sampdoria	1(4)
Udinese	1(1)
Lazio	3
Torino	1
Juventus	0(4)
Napoli	0(3)

Semifinals
Internazionale	0	1	1
Sampdoria	3	0	3
Lazio	2	2	4
Juventus	1	1	2

Final
Sampdoria	1(5)
Lazio	1(6)

==== Round of 16 ====
13 January 2009
21:00

Internazionale	3–1 (a.e.t.)	Genoa
Adriano 76'; Cambiasso 100'; Ibrahimović 104'		Rossi 79'

San Siro, Milan
Referee: Gabriele Gava

17 December 2008
21:00

Roma	2–0	Bologna
Vučinić 82', 86'

Stadio Olimpico, Rome
Referee: Paolo Mazzoleni

12 November 2008
19:30

Sampdoria	2–1	Empoli
Bonazzoli 31'; Fornaroli 45'		Lodi 62'

Stadio Luigi Ferraris, Genoa
Referee: Dino Tommasi

12 November 2008
15:00

Udinese	0–0	Reggina
	Report
Penalties
Luković (penalty scored); Obodo (penalty scored); Sala (penalty scored); Motta (penalty missed); Felipe (penalty scored); Nef (penalty scored); Asamoah (penalty scored); Pasquale (penalty missed); Koprivec (penalty scored); Luković (penalty scored)	8–7	(penalty scored) Tognozzi; (penalty scored) Ceravolo; (penalty scored) Barillà; (penalty missed) Viola; (penalty scored) Costa; (penalty scored) Rakić; (penalty scored) Basso; (penalty missed) Hallfreðsson; (penalty scored) Marino; (penalty missed) Tognozzi

Stadio Friuli, Udine
Referee: Antonio Giannoccaro

3 December 2008
20:45

Milan	1–2 (a.e.t.)	Lazio
Shevchenko 77'		Zárate 79' (pen.); Pandev 93'

San Siro, Milan
Referee: Nicola Ayroldi

17 December 2008
17:00

Fiorentina	0–1	Torino
		Bianchi 19'

Stadio Artemio Franchi, Florence
Referee: Antonio Damato

12 November 2008
21:00

Napoli	3–1	Salernitana
Peccarisi 16' (o.g.); Piá 25'; Hamšík 53' (pen.)		Di Napoli 50'

Stadio San Paolo, Naples
Referee: Andrea de Marco

14 January 2009
20:45

Juventus	3–0	Catania
Marchionni 4'; Giovinco 68'; Del Piero 70'

Stadio Olimpico, Turin
Referee: Luca Banti

==== Quarter-finals ====
21 January 2009
21:00

Internazionale	2–1	Roma
Adriano 10'; Ibrahimović 62'		Taddei 61'

San Siro, Milan
Referee: Daniele Orsato

21 January 2009
18:00

Udinese	1–1 (a.e.t.)	Sampdoria
Di Natale 63' (pen.)		Pazzini 55'
Penalties
D'Agostino (penalty missed); Di Natale (penalty scored); Pepe (penalty missed)	1–4	(penalty scored) Pazzini; (penalty scored) Palombo; (penalty scored) Sammarco; (penalty scored) Gastaldello

Stadio Friuli, Udine
Referee: Nicola Pierpaoli

22 January 2009
21:00

Lazio	3–1	Torino
Pandev 49'; Mauri 55'; Rocchi 91'		Natali 29'

Stadio Olimpico, Rome
Referee: Andrea Gervasoni

4 February 2009
20:45

Juventus	0–0 (a.e.t.)	Napoli
Penalties
Del Piero (penalty scored); Trezeguet (penalty scored); Nedvěd (penalty missed); Marchionni (penalty scored); Sissoko (penalty missed); Legrottaglie (penalty scored)	4–3	(penalty scored) Hamšík; (penalty scored) Bogliacino; (penalty scored) Denis; (penalty missed) Lavezzi; (penalty missed) Contini; (penalty missed) Gargano

Stadio Olimpico, Turin
Referee: Nicola Ayroldi

==== Semi-finals ====
===== First leg =====
4 March 2009
20:45

Sampdoria	3–0	Internazionale
Cassano 9'; Pazzini 30', 42'

Stadio Luigi Ferraris, Genoa
Referee: Massimiliano Saccani

3 March 2009
20:45

Lazio	2–1	Juventus
Pandev 65'; Rocchi 78'		Marchionni 34'

Stadio Olimpico, Rome
Referee: Paolo Tagliavento

===== Second leg =====
23 April 2009
20:45

Internazionale	1–0	Sampdoria
Ibrahimović 27'

San Siro, Milan
Referee: Daniele Orsato

22 April 2009
20:45

Juventus	1–2	Lazio
Del Piero 64'		Zárate 38'; Kolarov 52'

Stadio Olimpico, Turin
Referee: Nicola Rizzoli

== Final ==
13 May 2009
20:45 CEST

Lazio	1–1 (a.e.t.)	Sampdoria
Zárate 4'	Report	Pazzini 31'
Penalties
Ledesma (penalty scored); Rocchi (penalty missed); Rozehnal (penalty scored); Kolarov (penalty scored); Zárate (penalty scored); Lichtsteiner (penalty scored); Dabo (penalty scored)	6–5	(penalty missed) Cassano; (penalty scored) Palombo; (penalty scored) Pazzini; (penalty scored) Gastaldello; (penalty scored) Accardi; (penalty scored) Delvecchio; (penalty missed) Campagnaro

Stadio Olimpico, Rome
Attendance: 68,000
Referee: Roberto Rosetti

== Top goalscorers ==
Rank	Player	Club	Goals
1	(North Macedonia) Goran Pandev	Lazio	6
2	(Italy) Francesco Lodi	Empoli	5
2	(Italy) Massimiliano Varricchio	Padova	5
4	(Italy) Davide Succi	Ravenna	4
4	(Italy) Alessandro Diamanti	Livorno	4
4	(Italy) Giampaolo Pazzini	Sampdoria	4
7	(Sweden) Zlatan Ibrahimovic	Internazionale	3
7	(Argentina) Mauro Zárate	Lazio	3
7	(Italy) Felice Evacuo	Benevento	3
