= List of FC Crotone seasons =

F.C. Crotone is an Italian professional football club based in Crotone, Calabria, who play their matches in Stadio Ezio Scida. The club was formed in 1910, and the club's formal debut in an official league was in 1945. Before that time they played several amateur tournaments.

The club has won the Serie C1 once.

This list details the club's achievements in major competitions, and the top scorers for each season. Top scorers in bold were also the top scorers in the Italian league that season. Records of local or regional competitions are not included due to them being considered of less importance.

== Key ==
- Pld = Matches played
- W = Matches won
- D = Matches drawn
- L = Matches lost
- GF = Goals for
- GA = Goals against
- Pts = Points
- Pos = Final position
- Serie A = 1st Tier in Italian League
- Serie B = 2nd Tier in Italian League
- Serie C = 3rd Tier in Italian League
- Prima Categoria = 1st Tier until 1922
- Promozione = 2nd Tier until 1922
- Prima Divisione = 1st Tier until 1926
- Prima Divisione = 2nd Tier (1926–1929)
- Seconda Divisione = 2nd Tier until 1926
- Seconda Divisione = 3rd Tier (1926–1929)
- Divisione Nazionale = 1st Tier (1926–1929)
- F = Final
- SF = Semi-finals
- QF = Quarter-finals
- R16 = Last 16
- R32 = Last 32
- QR1 = First Qualifying Round
- QR2 = Second Qualifying Round
- QR3 = Third Qualifying Round
- PO = Play-Offs
- 1R = Round 1
- 2R = Round 2
- 3R = Round 3
- GS = Group Stage
- 2GS = Second Group Stage
- EC = European Cup (1955–1992)
- UCL = UEFA Champions League (1993–present)
- CWC = UEFA Cup Winners' Cup (1960–1999)
- UC = UEFA Cup (1971–2008)
- UEL = UEFA Europa League (2009–present)
- USC = UEFA Super Cup
- INT = Intercontinental Cup (1960–2004)
- WC = FIFA Club World Cup (2005–present)

**Champions**	Runners-up	Promoted	Relegated	1st Tier	2nd Tier	3rd Tier	4th Tier	5th Tier	6th Tier	7th Tier	8th Tier

== Seasons ==
Results of league and cup competitions by season
Season	Division	Pld	W	D	L	GF	GA	Pts	Pos	Cup	Supercoppa Italiana	Cup	Result	Player(s)	Goals
Season	League									Cup	Supercoppa Italiana	UEFA – FIFA		Top goalscorer(s)	
1945–46	Serie C Centro-Sud Girone C (3)	21	7	4	10	30	33	17	8th					n/a	
1946–47	Serie C Sud Girone C (3)	20	13	2	5	37	15	28	4th					n/a	
1947–48	Serie C Sud Girone S (3)	26	15	5	6	36	25	35	3rd					n/a	
1947–48	Serie C Sud Girone S (3)	26	15	5	6	36	25	35	3rd					n/a	
1948–49	Serie C Girone D (3)	34	10	9	15	37	47	29	13th					n/a	
1949–50	Serie C Girone D (3)	36	11	14	11	54	42	36	6th					n/a	
1950–51	Serie C Girone D (3)	36	11	14	11	54	42	36	9th					n/a	
1951–52	Serie C Girone D (3)	34	11	8	15	47	48	30	10th					n/a	
1952–53	IV Serie Girone H (4)	30	14	7	9	43	35	35	3rd					n/a	
1953–54	IV Serie Girone H (4)	30	10	8	12	46	50	28	11th					n/a	
1954–55	IV Serie Girone H (4)	34	15	9	10	50	38	39	6th					n/a	
1955–56	IV Serie Girone H (4)	34	11	10	13	35	45	32	13th					n/a	
1956–57	IV Serie Girone H (4)	34	9	12	13	47	40	30	10th					n/a	
1957–58	Campionato Interregionale Girone H (4)	30	10	9	11	48	45	29	10th					n/a	
1958–59	Campionato Interregionale Girone H (4)	34	21	7	6	66	27	49	1st					n/a	
1959–60	Serie C Girone C (3)	34	14	8	12	34	36	36	6th					Santo Barbato	11
1960–61	Serie C Girone C (3)	34	9	10	15	36	45	28	16th					Romano Forin	11
1961–62	Serie C Girone C (3)	34	9	12	13	24	32	30	14th					Giuseppe Rampazzo	7
1962–63	Serie C Girone C (3)	34	8	12	14	23	37	28	17th					Enzo Guarniero	7
1963–64	Serie D Girone F (4)	34	21	10	3	50	14	52	1st					n/a	
1964–65	Serie C Girone C (3)	34	10	11	13	26	32	31	16th					Ruggero Ronzulli	7
1965–66	Serie C Girone C (3)	34	10	13	11	25	31	33	11th					Domenico Pulvirenti	6
1966–67	Serie C Girone C (3)	34	11	7	16	29	35	29	17th					Giancarlo Ciabattari	6
1967–68	Serie C Girone C (3)	36	9	13	14	24	31	31	15th					Pietro Rasi	5
1968–69	Serie C Girone C (3)	38	10	15	13	24	28	35	13th					Loris De Carolis; Mario Tribuzio	5
1969–70	Serie C Girone C (3)	38	11	16	11	25	25	38	8th					Loris De Carolis	8
1970–71	Serie C Girone C (3)	38	11	12	15	25	36	34	15th					Angelo Seghezza	4
1971–72	Serie C Girone C (3)	38	10	15	13	23	34	35	17th					Vincenzo Damiano; Gaetano Montenegro	7
1972–73	Serie C Girone C (3)	38	10	12	16	34	47	32	17th					Gaetano Montenegro	10
1973-74	Serie C Girone C (3)	38	10	16	12	26	35	36	13th					Fedele Gualandri	7
1974–75	Serie C Girone C (3)	38	10	15	13	30	34	35	15th					Fedele Gualandri	11
1975–76	Serie C Girone C (3)	38	11	14	13	27	30	36	12th					Angelo Labellarte	11
1976–77	Serie C Girone C (3)	38	16	10	12	37	35	42	4th					Aldo Gravante	13
1977–78	Serie C Girone C (3)	38	3	20	15	28	53	25	19th					Paolo Piras	17
1978–79	Serie C2 Girone D (4)	34	8	9	17	31	53	27	18th					Alessandro Turini	11
1979–80	Prima Categoria Calabria (7)								1st					n/a	
1980–81	Promozione Calabria (6)	30	18	10	2	53	14	46	1st					n/a	
1981–82	Campionato Interregionale Gironi I (5)	30	17	7	6	46	22	41	3rd					n/a	
1982–83	Campionato Interregionale Gironi I (5)	30	14	12	4	36	16	40	2nd					n/a	
1983–84	Campionato Interregionale Gironi I (5)	30	18	9	3	35	10	45	1st					n/a	
1984–85	Serie C2 Gironi D (4)	34	5	17	12	27	37	27	18th					Elso Pelle	7
1985–86	Campionato Interregionale Gironi L (5)	30	8	13	9	32	32	29	11th					n/a	
1986–87	Campionato Interregionale Gironi L (5)	30	18	11	1	46	17	47	1st					n/a	
1987–88	Serie C2 Gironi D (4)	34	14	11	9	39	28	39	4th					Marcello Pitino	11
1988–89	Serie C2 Gironi D (4)	34	10	15	9	36	32	35	8th					Antonio Germano	8
1989–90	Serie C2 Gironi D (4)	34	8	16	10	33	34	32	12th					Carmelo Condemi	10
1990–91	Serie C2 Gironi D (4)	34	7	15	12	22	38	29	15th					Giuseppe Galluzzo	10
1991–92	L.N.D. Prima Categoria Calabria B (8)								1st					n/a	
1992–93	L.N.D. Promozione Calabria B (7)	30	15	10	5	48	22	40	2nd					n/a	
1993–94	L.N.D. Promozione Calabria A (7)	30	21	7	2	73	11	49	1st					n/a	
1994–95	L.N.D. Eccellenza Calabria (6)	30	21	6	3	86	11	48	1st					n/a	
1995–96	L.N.D. Girone I (5)	34	8	16	10	33	32	40	14th					n/a	
1996–97	L.N.D. Girone I (5)	38	22	9	7	54	30	75	1st					n/a	
1997–98	Serie C2 Girone C (4)	34	16	9	9	45	28	57	2nd					Maurizio Balestrieri; Giuseppe Tortora	13
1998–99	Serie C1 Girone B (3)	34	12	7	15	33	36	43	10th					Alessandro Ambrosi	19
1999–2000	Serie C1 Girone B (3)	34	19	12	3	65	28	69	1st					Firmino Elia; Andrea Fabbrini	7
2000–01	Serie B (2)	38	15	8	15	47	53	53	9th	GS				Andrea Deflorio	16
2001–02	Serie B (2)	38	5	10	23	44	70	25	20th	GS				Andrea Deflorio	10
2002–03	Serie C1 Girone B (3)	34	14	8	12	40	29	50	6th	GS				Edoardo Artistico	16
2003–04	Serie C1 Girone B (3)	34	19	8	7	57	33	65	2nd					Nazzareno Tarantino	12
2004–05	Serie B (2)	42	13	14	15	48	45	50	17th	GS				Daniele Vantaggiato	9
2005–06	Serie B (2)	42	18	9	15	56	48	63	9th	2R				Jeda	15
2006–07	Serie B (2)	42	7	11	24	36	67	32	21st	3R				Alfredo Cariello; Jaroslav Šedivec	6
2007–08	Prima Divisione Girone B (3)	34	14	13	7	45	30	55	4th	3R				Lorenzo Dal Rio	7
2008–09	Prima Divisione Girone B (3)	34	18	5	11	46	37	59	3rd	3R				n/a	
2009–10	Serie B (2)	42	17	11	14	52	50	62	8th	2R				Antonino Bonvissuto; Gabionetta	9
2010–11	Serie B (2)	42	13	15	14	45	50	54	11th	3R				Aniello Cutolo	11
2011–12	Serie B (2)	42	13	15	14	60	58	52	11th	4R				Caetano Calil	17
2012–13	Serie B (2)	42	14	13	15	45	56	55	12th	3R				Denilson Gabionetta	12
2013–14	Serie B (2)	42	17	12	13	56	52	63	6th	3R				Federico Bernardeschi	12
2014–15	Serie B (2)	42	12	12	18	43	52	48	17th	2R				Camillo Ciano	17
2015–16	Serie B (2)	42	23	13	6	61	36	82	2nd	4R				Ante Budimir	17
2016–17	Serie A (1)	38	9	7	22	34	58	34	17th	3R				Diego Falcinelli	13
2017–18	Serie A (1)	38	9	8	21	40	66	35	18th	4R				Marcello Trotta	8
2018–19	Serie B (2)	36	11	10	15	40	42	43	12th	4R				Simy	14
2019–20	Serie B (2)	38	20	8	10	63	40	68	2nd	3R				Simy	21
2020–21	Serie A (1)	38	6	5	27	45	92	23	19th	3R				Simy	20
2021–22	Serie B (2)	38	4	14	20	41	61	26	19th	2R				Mirko Marić	11
