= Leonardo Pettinari =

Leonardo Pettinari may refer to:

- Leonardo Pettinari (rower) (born 1973), Italian Olympic silver medalist
- Leonardo Pettinari (footballer) (born 1986), Italian footballer

== See also ==
- Pettinari
