= Stefano Scappini =

Italian footballer (born 1988)

Personal information
- Date of birth: 2 February 1988 (age 38)
- Place of birth: Perugia, Italy
- Height: 1.84 m (6 ft 0 in)
- Position: Forward

Team information
- Current team: Virtus
- Number: 90

Youth career
- Ternana

Senior career*
Years	Team	Apps	(Gls)
2007–2008	Ternana	21	(3)
2008–2014	Sampdoria	0	(0)
2008–2009	→ Ternana (loan)	22	(5)
2009–2010	→ Ravenna (loan)	24	(5)
2010–2011	→ Alessandria (loan)	30	(13)
2011–2012	→ Sorrento (loan)	34	(8)
2012–2013	→ Pisa (loan)	29	(5)
2013–2014	→ Grosseto (loan)	14	(0)
2014	→ Castel Rigone (loan)	14	(4)
2014–2015	Savona	39	(10)
2015–2016	Pontedera	34	(24)
2016–2018	Cremonese	66	(19)
2018–2019	Cittadella	24	(4)
2019–2020	Reggiana	17	(9)
2020–2021	→ Modena (loan)	31	(6)
2021–2022	Reggiana	25	(2)
2022–2023	Torres	30	(7)
2023–2024	Novara	27	(6)
2024–2025	Caldiero	15	(1)
2025–	Virtus	31	(19)
- * Club domestic league appearances and goals as of 25 June 2026

Stefano Scappini (born 2 February 1988) is an Italian footballer who plays as a forward for Campionato Sammarinese club Virtus.

== Career ==
=== Ternana ===
Born in Perugia, Umbria, Scappini started his career at Umbrian side Ternana. He made his professional debut in February 2007 and made a total of 21 matches at Serie C1.

=== Sampdoria ===
On 28 January 2008, he left for Serie A side Sampdoria in a temporary deal. He scored a goal for Sampdoria Primavera Under-20 Team at Torneo di Viareggio 2008 on 2 February. In July 2008, Sampdoria decided to buy him in co-ownership deal for €150,000 and loaned back to Ternana of Lega Pro Prima Divisione (ex-Serie C1). In June 2009, Sampdoria bought him outright after won the auction between the two clubs, for €105,000.

=== Ravenna ===
In July 2009, he was sent to Prima Divisione side Ravenna in another co-ownership deal for €120,000. He scored 6 goals, (1 at 2009–10 Coppa Italia), became the second highest goalscorer of the team ahead Luca Gerbino Polo, behind Federico Piovaccari. He successively joined Alessandria for the new 2010–11 season.

On 18 September 2009, he was involved in the accident which resulted in the death of his teammate Brian Filipi: the two players were hit by a car while walking in a street in Cervia.

=== Return to Sampdoria ===
On 24 June 2011, Sampdoria bought back Scappini from Ravenna for €200,000 in a 4-year contract. He was transferred to Sorrento, Pisa, Grosseto and Castel Rigone in temporary deals during his entire Sampdoria career.

=== Savona ===
On 22 August 2014 he was signed by Savona F.B.C. for free in a 1-year contract.

=== Pontedera and Cremonese ===
In the 2015–2016 season playing for the Pontedera; in the summer of 2016 he moved to Cremonese.

=== Cittadella ===
On 9 July 2018, he joined Serie B club Cittadella.

=== Serie C ===
On 25 July 2019, he signed with Reggiana. On 16 September 2020 he moved to Modena on loan.

On 22 September 2022, Scappini moved to Torres.

On 12 July 2023, Scappini joined Novara on a one-year deal.

On 26 November 2024, Scappini signed a contract with Caldiero until the end of the season.
