= Riccardo Petrucchi =

Italian football agent

Riccardo Petrucchi (born 21 December 1954) is an Italian football agent. Though English company Pluriel Limited (previously Mondo Service Limited), he brokered number of deals, including Mauro Zárate.

he was suspended seven months for third-party ownership on Zárate, as Pluriel Limited claimed €14.95 million from Lazio, excess Zárate's wage and comparable to Al-Sadd's €20 million. However it was shortened to just one month by Corte di Giustizia Federale of FIGC.

Petrucchi also suspended one year in September 2010 for Empoli F.C.'s deals. ( Abate, Almirón, Antonini, Fedeli, Gasparetto, Lodi, Marzoratti, Mchedlidze, Negrini, Rincón, Tavano, Volpe and Zanetti) But the suspension later shortened, ended on 1 March 2011 by the decision of Tribunale Nazionale di Arbitrato per lo Sport of CONI.
