= 2009–10 in Italian football =

The 2009–10 season was the 108th season of competitive football in Italy.

== Events ==
- August 23, 2009 – Serie A season began.

== Honours ==
Competition	Winner
Serie A	Inter
Supercoppa Italiana	Lazio
Coppa Italia	Inter

== National team ==
Pos	Team	Pld	W	D	L	GF	GA	GD	Pts	Qualification	(Italy)	(Republic of Ireland)	(Bulgaria)	(Cyprus)	(Montenegro)	(Georgia (country))
1	Italy	10	7	3	0	18	7	+11	24	Qualification to 2010 FIFA World Cup	—	1–1	2–0	3–2	2–1	2–0
2	Republic of Ireland	10	4	6	0	12	8	+4	18	Advance to second round	2–2	—	1–1	1–0	0–0	2–1
3	Bulgaria	10	3	5	2	17	13	+4	14		0–0	1–1	—	2–0	4–1	6–2
4	Cyprus	10	2	3	5	14	16	−2	9		1–2	1–2	4–1	—	2–2	2–1
5	Montenegro	10	1	6	3	9	14	−5	9		0–2	0–0	2–2	1–1	—	2–1
6	Georgia	10	0	3	7	7	19	−12	3		0–2	1–2	0–0	1–1	0–0	—

== League tables ==
=== Serie A ===
Pos	Team	Pld	W	D	L	GF	GA	GD	Pts	Qualification or relegation
1	Internazionale (C)	38	24	10	4	75	34	+41	82	Qualification to Champions League group stage
2	Roma	38	24	8	6	68	41	+27	80	Qualification to Champions League group stage
3	Milan	38	20	10	8	60	39	+21	70	Qualification to Champions League group stage
4	Sampdoria	38	19	10	9	49	41	+8	67	Qualification to Champions League play-off round
5	Palermo	38	18	11	9	59	47	+12	65	Qualification to Europa League play-off round
6	Napoli	38	15	14	9	50	43	+7	59	Qualification to Europa League play-off round
7	Juventus	38	16	7	15	55	56	−1	55	Qualification to Europa League third qualifying round
8	Parma	38	14	10	14	46	51	−5	52	
9	Genoa	38	14	9	15	57	61	−4	51	
10	Bari	38	13	11	14	49	49	0	50	
11	Fiorentina	38	13	8	17	48	47	+1	47	
12	Lazio	38	11	13	14	39	43	−4	46	
13	Catania	38	10	15	13	44	45	−1	45	
14	Chievo	38	12	8	18	37	42	−5	44 (Note: Chievo finished ahead of Udinese and Cagliari on head-to-head points: Chievo: 8 pts, Udinese: 6 pts, Cagliari: 1 pts.)	
15	Udinese	38	11	11	16	54	59	−5	44	
16	Cagliari	38	11	11	16	56	58	−2	44	
17	Bologna	38	10	12	16	42	55	−13	42	
18	Atalanta (R)	38	9	8	21	37	53	−16	35	Relegation to Serie B
19	Siena (R)	38	7	10	21	40	67	−27	31	Relegation to Serie B
20	Livorno (R)	38	7	8	23	27	61	−34	29	Relegation to Serie B

Source: Lega Calcio and Yahoo! Sport
Rules for classification: 1) points; 2) head-to-head points; 3) head-to-head goal difference; 4) head-to-head goals scored; 5) goal difference; 6) number of goals scored.
(C) Champions; (R) Relegated

=== Serie B ===
Pos	Team	Pld	W	D	L	GF	GA	GD	Pts	Promotion or relegation
1	Lecce (C, P)	42	20	15	7	66	47	+19	75	Promotion to Serie A
2	Cesena (P)	42	20	14	8	55	29	+26	74	Promotion to Serie A
3	Brescia (O, P)	42	21	9	12	60	44	+16	72	Qualification to play-offs
4	Sassuolo	42	18	15	9	60	42	+18	69	Qualification to play-offs
5	Torino	42	19	11	12	53	36	+17	68	Qualification to play-offs
6	Cittadella	42	18	12	12	62	43	+19	66	Qualification to play-offs
7	Grosseto	42	14	19	9	66	63	+3	61	
8	Crotone (Note: 2 points deducted due to financial irregularities.)	42	17	11	14	53	50	+3	60	
9	Ascoli	42	15	12	15	57	57	0	57	
10	Empoli	42	15	11	16	66	56	+10	56	
11	AlbinoLeffe	42	14	13	15	59	56	+3	55	
12	Modena	42	14	12	16	39	47	−8	54 (Note: MOD 1–0 REG; REG 0–1 MOD)	
13	Reggina	42	15	9	18	51	56	−5	54	
14	Vicenza	42	12	17	13	40	41	−1	53 (Note: VIC: 8 pts 4–1; PIA: 5 pts 4–5; FRO: 3 pts 4–6)	
15	Piacenza	42	13	14	15	40	45	−5	53	
16	Frosinone	42	15	8	19	50	67	−17	53	
17	Ancona (Note: 2 points deducted due to financial irregularities. Ancona was excluded from football by Federal Council's decision. Later an Eccellenza club claimed its heritage as US Ancona 1905. As a consequence, Triestina as losing sides of the relegation play-off were spared from relegation.) (E, R, R, R)	42	15	9	18	55	56	−1	52	Claiming club in Eccellenza
18	Triestina (T)	42	13	12	17	41	51	−10	51 (Note: PAD 0–0 TRI; TRI 2–1 PAD)	Spared from relegation
19	Padova	42	12	15	15	44	48	−4	51	Relegation play-off
20	Mantova (Note: Mantova went bankrupt after its relegation at the end of the season.) (R, E, R)	42	10	18	14	46	58	−12	48	Phoenix in Serie D
21	Gallipoli (Note: Gallipoli went bankrupt after its relegation at the end of the season.) (R, E, R, R, R)	42	10	10	22	43	74	−31	40	Phoenix in Promozione
22	Salernitana (Note: 6 points deducted due to match-fixing during the 2007–08 Serie C1 season.) (R)	42	5	8	29	40	80	−40	17	Relegation to Prima Divisione

Source: http://www.gazzetta.it/speciali/risultati_classifiche/2010/calcio/serieb/index.shtml
Rules for classification: 1) points; 2) goal difference; 3) number of goals scored.
(C) Champions; (E) Eliminated; (O) Play-off winners; (P) Promoted; (R) Relegated; (T) Qualified, but not yet for the particular phase indicated

== Inter Milan ==
=== UEFA Champions League ===
==== Group stage ====
Group F
Team	Pld	W	D	L	GF	GA	GD	Pts
(Spain) Barcelona	6	3	2	1	7	3	+4	11
(Italy) Internazionale	6	2	3	1	7	6	+1	9
(Russia) Rubin Kazan	6	1	3	2	4	7	−3	6
(Ukraine) Dynamo Kyiv	6	1	2	3	7	9	−2	5

16 September 2009 1	Internazionale (Italy)	0 – 0	(Spain) Barcelona	Milan, Italy
20:45 CEST (UTC+02:00)	Chivu (yellow card) 90'	Report	Henry (yellow card) 54'; Touré (yellow card) 83'	Stadium: San Siro; Attendance: 77,321; Referee: Wolfgang Stark (Germany)

29 September 2009 2	Rubin Kazan (Russia)	1 – 1	(Italy) Internazionale	Kazan, Russia
18:30 CEST (UTC+02:00)	Karadeniz (yellow card) 9'; Domínguez 11'	Report	Samuel (yellow card) 14'; Balotelli (yellow card) 20' (yellow-red card) 60'; Stanković 27'; Maicon (yellow card) 63'	Stadium: Central Stadium; Attendance: 23,670; Referee: Terje Hauge (Norway)

20 October 2009 3	Internazionale (Italy)	2 – 2	(Ukraine) Dynamo Kyiv	Milan, Italy
20:45 CEST (UTC+02:00)	Stanković (yellow card) 23', (goal) 35'; Maicon (yellow card) 29'; Samuel 47'; Chivu (yellow card) 52'; Zanetti (yellow card) 83'	Report	Mykhalyk 5'; Almeida (yellow card) 31'; Lúcio 40' (o.g.); Shevchenko (yellow card) 61'; Milevskyi (yellow card) 68'; Vukojević (yellow card) 82'	Stadium: San Siro; Attendance: 34,721; Referee: Martin Atkinson (England)

4 November 2009 4	Dynamo Kyiv (Ukraine)	1 – 2	(Italy) Internazionale	Kyiv, Ukraine
20:45 CET (UTC+01:00)	Shevchenko 21'; Almeida (yellow card) 28'; Mykhalyk (yellow card) 53'	Report	Samuel (yellow card) 23'; Lúcio (yellow card) 45'; Milito 86'; Sneijder 89'	Stadium: Lobanovsky Dynamo Stadium; Attendance: 15,900; Referee: Bertrand Layec (France)

24 November 2009 5	Barcelona (Spain)	2 – 0	(Italy) Internazionale	Barcelona, Spain
20:45 CET (UTC+01:00)	Piqué 10'; Pedro 26', (yellow card) 50'; Puyol (yellow card) 34'	Report	Motta (yellow card) 18'; Chivu (yellow card) 80'; Zanetti (yellow card) 89'	Stadium: Camp Nou; Attendance: 93,524; Referee: Massimo Busacca (Switzerland)

9 December 2009 6	Internazionale (Italy)	2 – 0	(Russia) Rubin Kazan	Milan, Italy
20:45 CET (UTC+01:00)	Eto'o 31'; Balotelli (yellow card) 46', (goal) 64'; Lúcio (yellow card) 69'	Report	Murawski (yellow card) 28'; Navas (yellow card) 43'	Stadium: San Siro; Attendance: 49,539; Referee: Pieter Vink (Netherlands)

==== Knockout phase ====
===== Round of 16 =====
24 February 2010 First leg	Internazionale (Italy)	2 – 1	(England) Chelsea	Milan, Italy
20:45 CET (UTC+01:00)	Milito 3', (yellow card) 22'; Motta (yellow card) 9'; Cambiasso 55'	Report	Kalou (yellow card) 23', (goal) 51'	Stadium: San Siro; Attendance: 78,971; Referee: Manuel Mejuto González (Spain)

16 March 2010 Second leg	Chelsea (England)	0 – 1 (1 – 3 agg.)	(Italy) Internazionale	London, England
20:45 CET (UTC+01:00)	Molouda (yellow card) 55'; Drogba (yellow card) 57' (yellow-red card) 87'; Alex (yellow card) 83'; Terry (yellow card) 89'	Report	Eto'o (yellow card) 17', (goal) 78'; Motta (yellow card) 48'; Lúcio (yellow card) 54'; Júlio César (yellow card) 82'	Stadium: Stamford Bridge; Attendance: 38,107; Referee: Wolfgang Stark (Germany)

===== Quarter-finals =====
31 March 2010 First leg	Internazionale (Italy)	1 – 0	(Russia) CSKA Moscow	Milan, Italy
20:45 CEST (UTC+02:00)	Materazzi (yellow card) 12'; Milito 65'	Report	Krasić (yellow card) 32'; Aldonin (yellow card) 37'	Stadium: San Siro; Attendance: 69,398; Referee: Howard Webb (England)

6 April 2010 Second leg	CSKA Moscow (Russia)	0 – 1 (0 – 2 agg.)	(Italy) Internazionale	Moscow, Russia
18:30 CEST (UTC+02:00)	Odiah (yellow card) 38' (yellow-red card) 49'; Mamayev (yellow card) 63'	Report	Sneijder 6'; Stanković (yellow card) 16'	Stadium: Luzhniki Stadium; Attendance: 54,400; Referee: Stéphane Lannoy (France)

===== Semi-finals =====
20 April 2010 First leg	Internazionale (Italy)	3 – 1	(Spain) Barcelona	Milan, Italy
20:45 CEST (UTC+02:00)	Eto'o (yellow card) 12'; Sneijder 30'; Maicon 48'; Milito 61'; Stanković (yellow card) 82'	Report	Pedro 19'; Busquets (yellow card) 45+1'; Puyol (yellow card) 51'; Piqué (yellow card) 60'; Keita (yellow card) 68'; Alves (yellow card) 84'	Stadium: San Siro; Attendance: 79,609; Referee: Olegário Benquerença (Portugal)

28 April 2010 Second leg	Barcelona (Spain)	1 – 0 (2 – 3 agg.)	(Italy) Internazionale	Barcelona, Spain
20:45 CEST (UTC+02:00)	Pedro (yellow card) 27'; Piqué 84'	Report	Motta (yellow card) 10' (red card) 28'; Júlio César (yellow card) 34'; Chivu (yellow card) 43'; Lúcio (yellow card) 82'; Muntari (yellow card) 82'	Stadium: Camp Nou; Attendance: 96,214; Referee: Frank De Bleeckere (Belgium)

===== Final =====
22 May 2010 Final	Bayern Munich (Germany)	0 – 2	(Italy) Internazionale	Madrid, Spain
20:45 CEST (UTC+02:00)	Demichelis (yellow card) 26'; Van Bommel (yellow card) 78'	Report	Chivu (yellow card) 30'; Milito 35', 70'	Stadium: Santiago Bernabéu Stadium; Attendance: 80,354; Referee: Howard Webb (England)

== Deaths ==
- September 18, 2009 — Brian Filipi, 20, Ravenna midfielder and Albania youth international, killed in a car accident.
- October 13, 2009 — Massimo Mattolini, 56, former Serie A goalkeeper with Fiorentina and Napoli, Coppa Italia winner in 1975, kidney failure.
- November 10, 2009 — Flora Viola, 86, widow of late Roma President Dino Viola, and club chairwoman herself during the year 1991.
- December 26, 2009 — Giuseppe Chiappella, 85, former midfielder, 1955–56 Serie A winner with Fiorentina, Italian international footballer, and later manager for Fiorentina and Internazionale.
- March 10, 2010 — Tonino Carino, 65, popular Italian RAI journalist who was active in football, best famous for his coverage of Ascoli games during the club's period in the Serie A in the 1980s and 1990s.
- March 20, 2010 — Naim Krieziu, 92, Albanian former striker/winger, one of the two last surviving members with Amedeo Amadei of the Roma team who won the club's first Italian title in 1942.
- April 3, 2010 - Maurizio Mosca, 69, popular Italian journalist and TV presenter who was active in football.
