= Cafiero =

Cafiero is an Italian surname. Notable people with the surname include:

- Antonio Cafiero (1922–2014), Argentine politician
- Carlo Cafiero (1846–1892), Italian anarchist
- Claudio Cafiero (born 1989), Italian footballer
- Federico Cafiero (1914–1980), Italian mathematician
- James Cafiero (1928–2023), American politician
- John Cafiero, American musician and director
- Juan Pablo Cafiero (born 1953), Argentine politician
- Mario Cafiero (died 2020), Argentine politician
- Santiago Cafiero (born 1979), Argentine politician
