= Mauro Zárate =

Argentine footballer (born 1987)

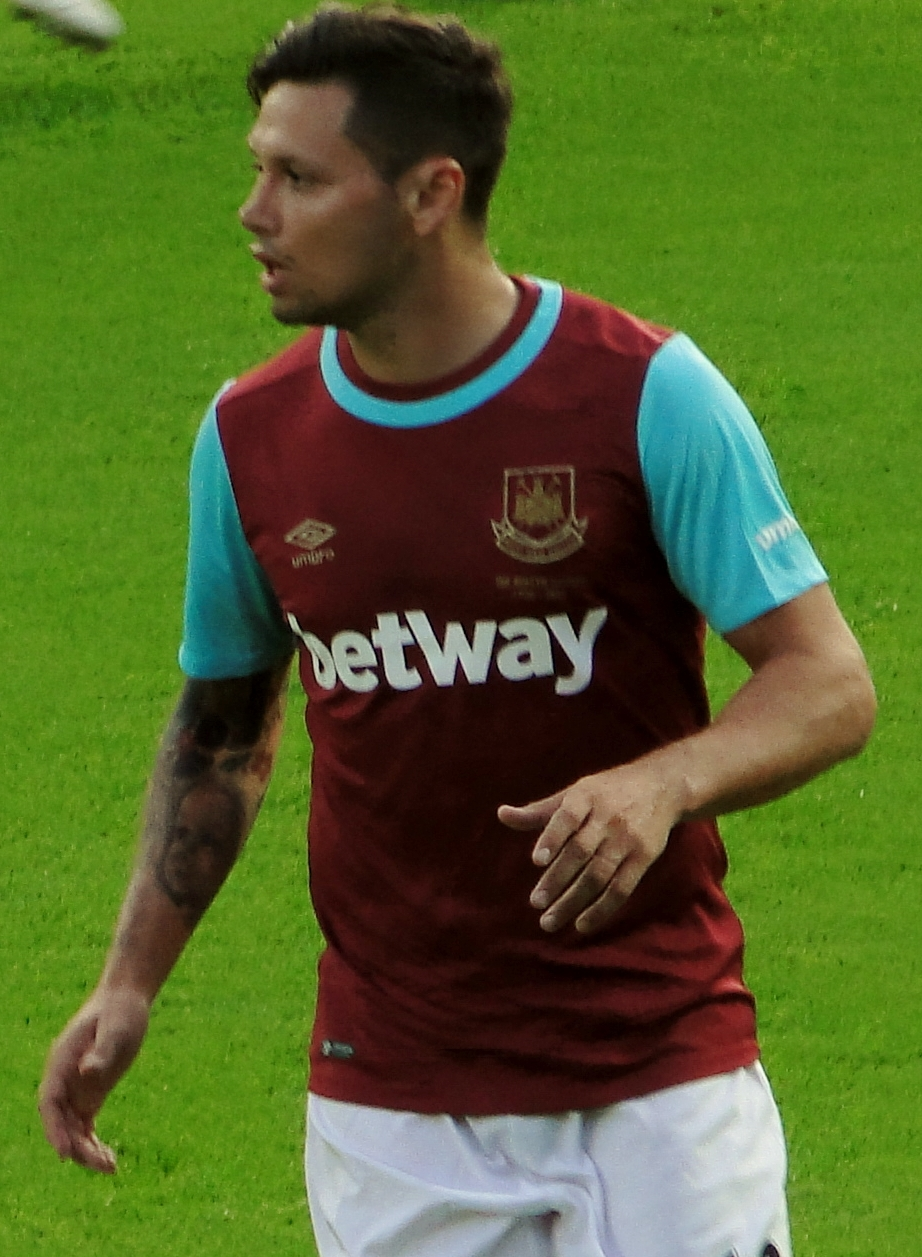
- Zárate playing for West Ham United in 2015

Personal information
- Full name: Mauro Matías Zárate
- Date of birth: 13 March 1987 (age 39)
- Place of birth: Haedo, Argentina
- Height: 1.76 m (5 ft 9 in)
- Positions: Forward; attacking midfielder

Youth career
- Vélez Sarsfield

Senior career*
Years	Team	Apps	(Gls)
2004–2007	Vélez Sarsfield	75	(22)
2007–2009	Al-Sadd	6	(4)
2008	→ Birmingham City (loan)	14	(4)
2008–2009	→ Lazio (loan)	36	(13)
2009–2013	Lazio	68	(12)
2011–2012	→ Inter Milan (loan)	22	(2)
2013–2014	Vélez Sarsfield	28	(18)
2014–2016	West Ham United	22	(5)
2015	→ Queens Park Rangers (loan)	4	(0)
2016–2017	Fiorentina	22	(5)
2017–2018	Watford	3	(0)
2017	→ Al-Nasr (loan)	8	(3)
2018	→ Vélez Sarsfield (loan)	13	(8)
2018–2021	Boca Juniors	52	(10)
2021	América Mineiro	16	(1)
2022	Juventude	3	(1)
2022	Platense	20	(3)
2023	Cosenza	3	(0)
2023	Danubio	7	(1)

International career
2007	Argentina U20	5	(2)
Medal record
Men's football
Representing Argentina
FIFA U-20 World Cup
Winner	2007 Canada
- * Club domestic league appearances and goals as of 13 July 2023

Mauro Matías Zárate (Latin American Spanish: [ˈmawɾo maˈti.as ˈsaɾate]; born 13 March 1987) is an Argentine former professional footballer who played as a forward.

Zárate started his career with Vélez Sarsfield in his native country, playing three years for the team and winning the Primera División title in the 2005 Clausura tournament. He later signed for Qatari side Al-Sadd in 2007, where he played only six months before transferring on loan to Birmingham City in England. However, after Birmingham's relegation, Zárate was loaned out again, this time to Lazio in Italy, where he won the Coppa Italia. His move to Lazio was then made permanent for a fee of around €20 million, with a €60 million buy-out clause. After a loan at Inter Milan and a brief return to Vélez Sarsfield, he joined West Ham United in 2014, spending the second half of his first season on loan at Queens Park Rangers. In January 2016, Zárate joined Italian club Fiorentina. A year later, he returned to England, joining Watford on a two-and-a-half-year, £2.3 million deal.

At international level, Zárate scored the winning goal as the Argentina under-20 team won the 2007 FIFA U-20 World Cup final.

== Club career ==
=== Vélez Sarsfield ===
Zárate began his club football career at Vélez Sarsfield where he had played since childhood. At age 17, considered too strong for the youth category, he was promoted to the first team with which he made his full debut on 21 April 2004 against Arsenal de Sarandí. He shared the top-scorer award for the Apertura 2006 with Rodrigo Palacio (Boca Juniors) with 12 goals each.

=== Al-Sadd ===
On 18 June 2007, Zárate signed a two-year deal with Al-Sadd in the Qatari League for a fee reported by Clarín at $22 million. However, he did not remain in Qatar long, playing just six league matches and scoring four goals, before heading on loan to English Premier League side Birmingham City.

==== Birmingham City (loan) ====
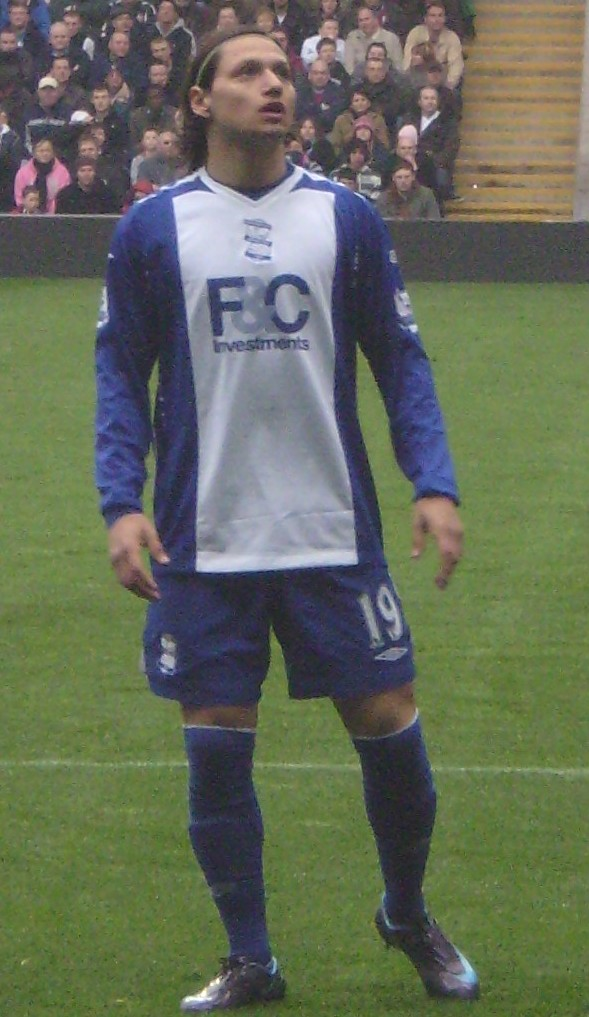
Zárate playing for Birmingham City in 2008

On 21 January 2008, Zárate joined Premier League side Birmingham City on loan until the end of the 2007–08 season, with a view to a permanent deal. He made his debut for the club in the 2–0 defeat at Sunderland on 29 January as a 66th-minute substitute for Cameron Jerome, and made his first start on 12 March against Portsmouth. He scored his first goal for the club against Reading on 22 March, followed by a brace in their next match against Manchester City in a 3–1 win, and a free-kick that earned a draw against Everton on 12 April. After a total of 4 goals in 14 matches, Zárate left the club at the end of his loan spell, their relegation from the Premier League meaning no extension to the loan would be considered.

=== Lazio ===
Zárate completed a move to Italian Serie A club Lazio on 5 July 2008. He joined initially on loan, for €2.4 million, with Lazio having an option to make the deal permanent, and following a successful medical, he was presented to the media a few days later.

Zárate immediately endeared himself to the Lazio faithful, scoring twice in his Serie A debut against Cagliari and dedicating the second to the Lazio supporters. He also scored on his home debut, with a left-footed strike from outside the penalty area against Sampdoria. This rich goalscoring form continued with Zárate scoring once against Milan at the San Siro, twice against Torino and another against Siena. However, by mid-season, Zárate hit a dip in form and found himself being substituted for captain Tommaso Rocchi, who was returning to form following serious injury.

On 28 February, Zárate scored both Lazio goals in a 2–0 win at the Olimpico against Bologna; he became the sixth-highest top scorer in the 2008–09 Serie A with ten goals.

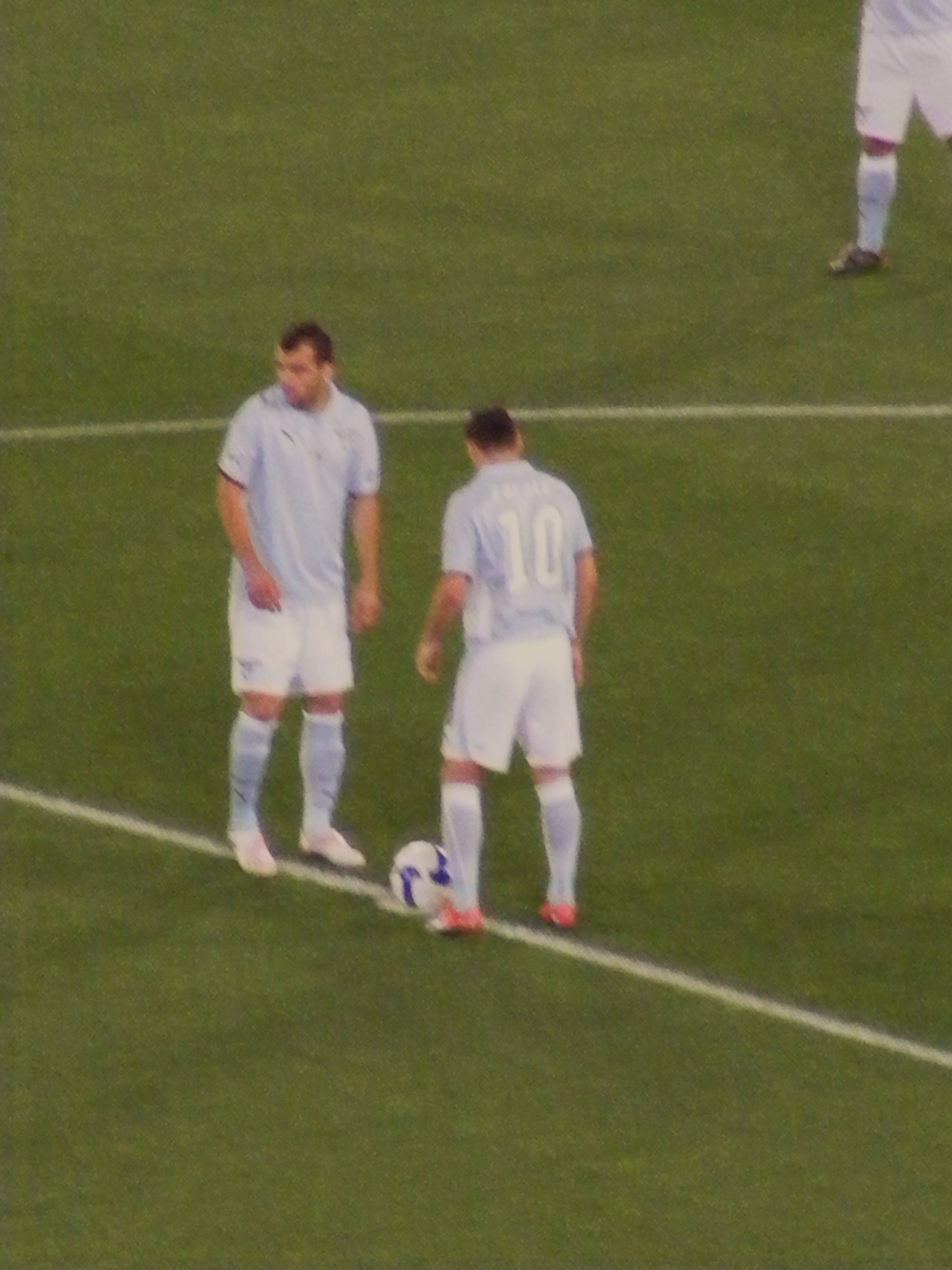
Zárate kicking off the 2009 Coppa Italia Final with Goran Pandev

On 13 May, Zárate won the Coppa Italia with Lazio, scoring a fourth-minute goal in the 1–1 draw with Sampdoria in the final, as well as a penalty in the victorious shootout. After the season ended, his move to Lazio was made permanent for a fee of approximately €20 million, with a €60 million buy-out clause included in the contract. The Italian Football Federation (FIGC) later fined Lazio and suspended club president Claudio Lotito over financial irregularities around the transfer. (Note: The Italian Football Federation (FIGC) later revealed Lazio had to pay an additional €14.95 million to an agent company, Pluriel Limited, whose sole director was Riccardo Petrucchi, in five-year instalments (hidden in agent commission, (Italian: Costi per intermediazione tesserati)), which Zárate's salary was just €7.2 million in net in total in his five-year contract. The FIGC ruled that president Claudio Lotito and Lazio violated the third parties ownership rule in relation to both Zárate and Julio Cruz. The FIGC suspended Lotito for ten months and fined Lazio €80,000.)

Zárate caused controversy when he was photographed apparently giving a fascist salute while watching Lazio lose to Bari in March 2010 among a group of fans, though his spokesman claimed afterwards the player "did not realise the significance of his gesture" and did not know who Hitler or Mussolini were.

In 2010, Zárate's transfer was involved in another controversy for solidarity contribution. (Note: In July 2010, FIFA's Dispute Resolution Chamber passed a decision that ordered Lazio to pay an additional solidarity contribution of €726,936 owed to Vélez Sarsfield. Lazio only paid €73,442.77 corresponding to the €2.4 million loan fee. They rejected Lazio's claim that the club had paid €20M to Zárate, who had then paid Al-Sadd to terminate his contract in April 2009, so that he was signed as a free agent and the €20 million was not a transfer fee. In February 2011, Lazio appealed, but the appeal was dismissed.)

==== Inter Milan (loan) ====
On 31 August 2011, Zárate completed a loan deal from Lazio to Inter Milan with a view to a permanent transfer. On 27 September 2011, he scored a 79th-minute winner, his first goal for the club, in an away match against CSKA Moscow in the group stage of the 2011–12 UEFA Champions League. His first Serie A goal for Inter did not come until 1 April 2012, when he scored their fourth goal, a "spectacular curling right-footed shot" in a 5–4 win against Genoa. He finished the 2011–12 season with 3 goals from 29 appearances in all competitions.

==== Lazio return ====
Zárate returned to Lazio for the 2012–13 season. However, he made only five appearances, four in the UEFA Europa League and one in Serie A, all without scoring, and he did not play for the club after November 2012. In March 2013, he was fined €500,000 by Lazio – he had requested time-off to fly home to Argentina to receive treatment for a skin condition, but instead, he flew with his family on a holiday in the Maldives.

=== Vélez Sarsfield return ===
In July 2013, Zárate returned to his first club, Vélez Sarsfield, without terminating his contract with Lazio. Consequently, on 2 July 2015, FIFA ruled Lazio were eligible to receive €5.26 million in compensation, which Vélez and Zárate were jointly liable. In January 2014, Zárate was a member of the side which won the 2013 Supercopa Argentina, beating Arsenal de Sarandí 1–0 in the final. He finished the season as top scorer in Primera División Torneo Final with 13 goals in 19 matches.

=== West Ham United ===
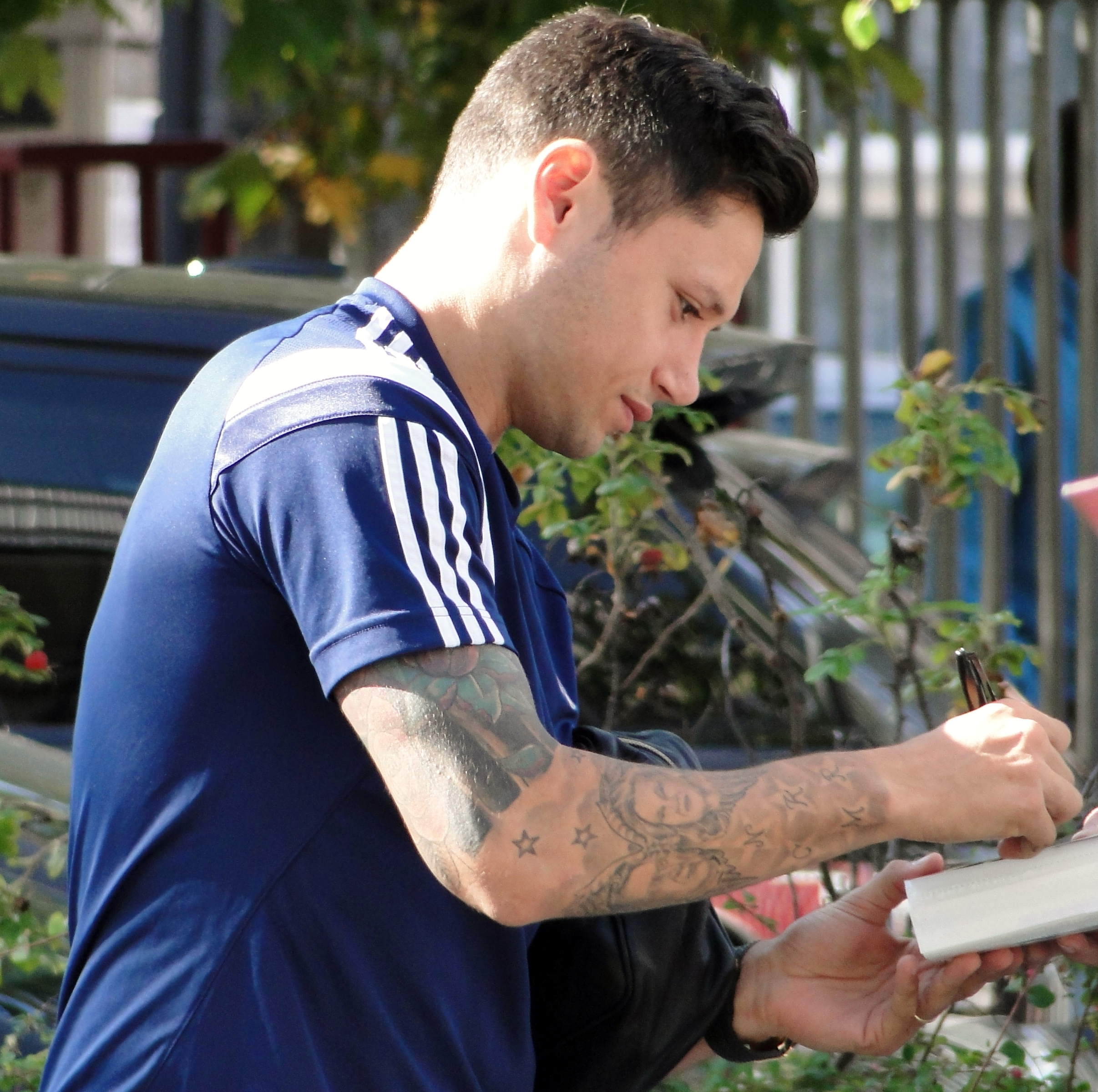
Zárate signing autographs at the Boleyn Ground in 2014

On 28 May 2014, Zárate signed a three-year contract with Premier League club West Ham United to take effect when the international transfer window opened in June. On 23 August, he scored on his competitive debut for the club, opening a 3–1 win away to Crystal Palace with a 20-yard volley.

==== Queens Park Rangers (loan) ====
On 6 January 2015, Zárate was loaned to fellow Premier League club Queens Park Rangers until the end of the season, having scored two goals in eight matches for West Ham. Having made four appearances for QPR without scoring, in May 2015, Zárate reacted angrily to being omitted from the squad for a match against Liverpool. His actions were deemed bad enough by the club that he was ordered to make his own way back to London and was subsequently banned and fined two weeks' wages. Such was the length of the ban, coinciding with the end of the season, this effectively ended his QPR career.

==== West Ham United return ====
Zárate featured in West Ham's 2015–16 UEFA Europa League qualifying campaign in pre-season, scoring his first goal of the season in a 2–2 draw at the Boleyn Ground against Romanian club Astra Giurgiu. West Ham eventually lost the tie 3–4 after a narrow second leg defeat.

Zárate scored from outside the penalty area to conclude West Ham's 2–0 win over Arsenal at the Emirates Stadium in their opening match game of the 2015–16 Premier League season. His deflected strike could not save West Ham from third round elimination in the 2015–16 League Cup, Leicester City prevailing 2–1 after extra time. He continued his good early season scoring form as he scored the opening goal in the Hammers' 2–1 victory over Chelsea on 24 October, following this up with a free-kick in a televised match against West Bromwich Albion on 29 November, a 1–1 draw.

=== Fiorentina ===
On 21 January 2016, Zárate completed a move to Italian club Fiorentina for an undisclosed fee, reported by Sky Sports to be £1.6 million. He made his debut for La Viola ten days later, starting in their goalless draw at Genoa. On 3 February, he scored his first goal for the team, the last-minute winner in a 2–1 victory over Carpi at the Stadio Artemio Franchi. However, 11 days later, he was sent off in a win by the same score against Inter for grabbing at Jeison Murillo; he subsequently received a three-match ban.

=== Watford ===
On 25 January 2017, Zárate joined Premier League side Watford on a two-and-a-half-year deal. On 25 February, he won a penalty in a game against his former club West Ham, but later injured his cruciate ligament after twisting his knee awkwardly. Zárate needed nine minutes of medical attention and would likely miss the rest of the season.

==== Al-Nasr (loan) ====
On 2 October 2017, Zárate joined United Arab Emirati club Al-Nasr in a loan deal slated to run until the end of the 2017–18 season. After failing to find the net in his first four games, he then scored three goals in as many games for the UAE Pro-League club.

==== Vélez Sarsfield (loan) ====
In January 2018, after eight appearances for Al-Nasr, it was announced that Zárate had rejoined Vélez Sarsfield on loan, for his third spell at the club where he started his career.

=== Boca Juniors ===
In July 2018, Zárate signed for Boca Juniors, despite previously indicating his intention to sign permanently with Velez. In May 2021, Zárate left Boca Juniors despite qualifying for the Round of 16 in Copa Libertadores due to the lack of playing time.

=== América Mineiro, Juventude and Platense ===
On 30 August 2021, Zárate joined Brazilian Série A side América Mineiro.

After a short stint with Juventude in Brazil, he then moved back to Argentina to join Platense.

=== Cosenza ===
On 31 January 2023, Zárate agreed to return to Italy by joining Serie B relegation-struggling side Cosenza on a contract until 30 June 2023. Zárate's stint with the Lupi was however short-lived, as he suffered an ACL injury just a few weeks later.

== International career ==
In 2007, Zárate helped the Argentina national under-20 team win the 2007 FIFA U-20 World Cup, scoring the winning goal in the final against the Czech Republic.

In 2008, Diego Maradona was appointed manager of the Argentina national team and said that if Zárate's good form continued, he would get a chance with that team.

In 2014, Zárate opted to play international football for Chile after not being named in the latest Argentina squad chosen by manager Gerardo Martino. He is eligible for the country through his father. However, in 2015, Zárate expressly stated he is Argentine and has always dreamt of playing for Argentina.

== Personal life ==
Zárate was born in Haedo, Buenos Aires, to a footballing family. His father Sergio is a Chilean former professional footballer who played for Independiente de Avellaneda. His mother, Catalina Riga, has Italian origins from Catanzaro in southern Italy. His grandfather Juvenal was Chilean and also a footballer.

Mauro is the youngest brother of former footballers Rolando and Ariel, as well as former international Sergio, who acts as Mauro's agent. Mauro's nephew, Tobías, also became a professional footballer.

== Career statistics ==
As of 14 June 2022

Appearances and goals by club, season and competition
Club	Season	League			Cup		Continental		Other (Note: Includes appearances in Supercoppa Italiana, Supercopa Argentina, EFL Cup, Copa de la Superliga and Campeonato Gaúcho)		Total	
Club	Season	Division	Apps	Goals	Apps	Goals	Apps	Goals	Apps	Goals	Apps	Goals
Vélez Sarsfield	2003–04	Primera División	5	1	—		0	0	—		5	1
Vélez Sarsfield	2004–05	Primera División	14	2	—		0	0	—		14	2
Vélez Sarsfield	2005–06	Primera División	24	3	—		12	3	—		36	6
Vélez Sarsfield	2006–07	Primera División	32	16	—		12	3	—		44	19
Vélez Sarsfield	Total		75	22	—		24	6	—		99	28
Al Sadd	2007	Qatar Stars League	6	4	0	0	0	0	—		6	4
Birmingham City (loan)	2007–08	Premier League	14	4	0	0	—		—		14	4
Lazio (loan)	2008–09	Serie A	36	13	5	3	—		—		41	16
Lazio	2009–10	Serie A	32	3	2	1	7	4	1	0	42	8
Lazio	2010–11	Serie A	35	9	1	0	—		—		36	9
Lazio	2012–13	Serie A	1	0	0	0	6	1	—		7	1
Lazio	Total		104	25	8	4	13	5	1	0	126	34
Inter Milan (loan)	2011–12	Serie A	22	2	2	0	7	1	0	0	31	3
Vélez Sarsfield	2013–14	Primera División	28	18	0	0	7	1	1	0	36	19
West Ham United	2014–15	Premier League	7	2	0	0	—		1	0	8	2
West Ham United	2015–16	Premier League	15	3	1	0	4	1	1	1	21	5
West Ham United	Total		22	5	1	0	4	1	2	1	29	7
Queens Park Rangers (loan)	2014–15	Premier League	4	0	0	0	—		—		4	0
Fiorentina	2015–16	Serie A	15	3	0	0	2	0	—		17	3
Fiorentina	2016–17	Serie A	7	2	1	0	1	2	—		9	4
Fiorentina	Total		22	5	1	0	3	2	—		26	7
Watford	2016–17	Premier League	3	0	0	0	—		—		3	0
Al Nasr (loan)	2017–18	Arabian Gulf League	8	3	5	0	—		—		13	3
Vélez Sarsfield (loan)	2017–18	Primera División	13	8	0	0	—		—		13	8
Boca Juniors	2018–19	Primera División	23	6	3	0	12	6	8	1	46	13
Boca Juniors	2019–20	Primera División	12	2	2	1	5	0	—		19	3
Boca Juniors	2020–21	Primera División	17	2	1	2	2	0	—		20	4
Boca Juniors	Total		52	10	6	3	19	6	8	1	85	20
América Mineiro	2021	Série A	16	1	0	0	—		—		16	1
Juventude	2022	Série A	0	0	0	0	—		3	1	3	1
Platense	2022	Primera División	2	1	0	0	—		—		2	1
Career total			391	108	23	7	77	22	15	3	506	140

== Honours ==
Vélez Sarsfield

- Argentine Primera División: 2005 Clausura
- Supercopa Argentina: 2013

Lazio

- Coppa Italia: 2008–09
- Supercoppa Italiana: 2009

Boca Juniors

- Primera División: 2019–20
- Copa Argentina: 2019–20
- Copa de la Liga Profesional: 2020
- Supercopa Argentina: 2018

Argentina U20

- FIFA World Youth Championship: 2007

Individual

- Argentine Primera División top scorer: 2006 Apertura, 2014 Final (both with Vélez Sarsfield)
