= Tommaso Bellazzini =

Italian footballer

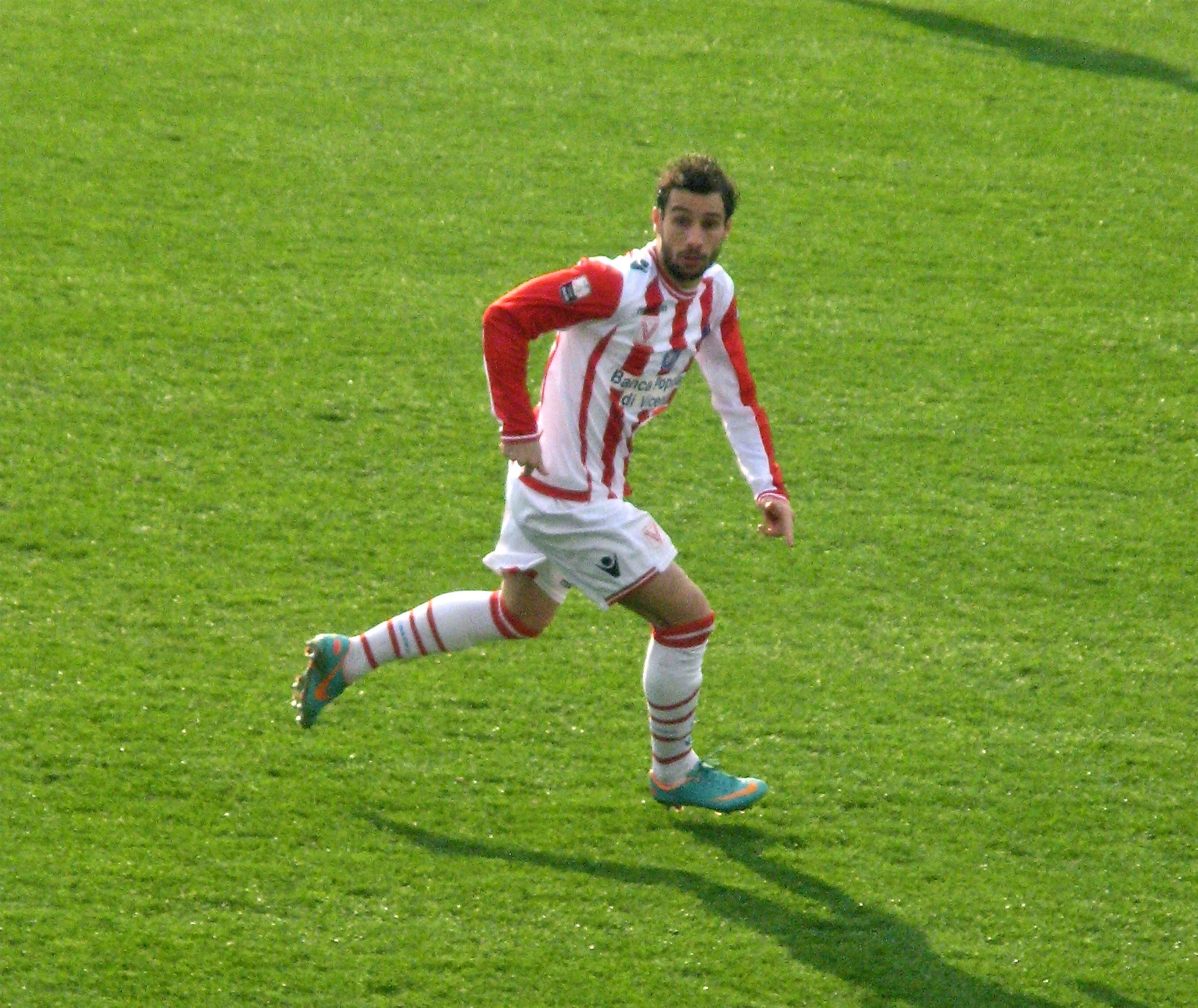

Personal information
- Date of birth: 23 December 1987 (age 38)
- Place of birth: Pisa, Italy
- Height: 1.78 m (5 ft 10 in)
- Positions: Attacking midfielder; winger

Team information
- Current team: Aglianese

Youth career
- 2004–2006: Fiorentina

Senior career*
Years	Team	Apps	(Gls)
2006–2009	Pistoiese	79	(3)
2009–2013	Cittadella	92	(12)
2013	→ Vicenza (loan)	20	(1)
2013–2014	Lecce	10	(0)
2014–2015	Venezia	33	(9)
2015–2016	Pavia	13	(3)
2016–2017	Pistoiese	16	(2)
2017–2018	AC Rezzato	16	(7)
2018–2019	Alessandria	50	(5)
2019–2020	Giana Erminio	6	(0)
2020–	Aglianese	0	(0)

International career
2005	Italy U18	3	(0)
- * Club domestic league appearances and goals as of 16 February 2020

Tommaso Bellazzini (born 23 December 1987) is an Italian footballer who plays as an attacking midfielder or winger for Aglianese.

== Club career ==
Born in Pisa, Bellazzini started his career at local Fiorentina. After playing two seasons with La Viola's Primavera team, he joined Pistoiese in co-ownership deal in 2005. Two years later, Bellazzini joined the latter in a full status. He was the regular of the Lega Pro Prima Divisione side and finished 16th with team in 2008–09 season.

On 4 July 2009, a few days before the club's bankruptcy, Bellazzini was loaned to Serie B side Cittadella, reuniting with former teammate Leonardo Pettinari, after sharing rooms at Fiorentina's youth squads.

On 25 January 2013 Bellazzini was signed by Vicenza, with Mattia Minesso moved to opposite direction.

On 2 August 2013 Bellazzini joined Lecce.

On 16 July 2014 Bellazzini was signed by Venezia.

On 26 June 2015 Bellazzini was signed by Pavia.

On 5 December 2019, he signed with Serie C club Giana Erminio until the end of the 2019–20 season.

On 30 September 2020, he joined Serie D club Aglianese.

== International career ==
Bellazzini appeared with Italy under-18's in three matches during 2005.
