= Pettinari =

Pettinari is an Italian surname that may refer to:

- Leonardo Pettinari (footballer) (born 1986), Italian footballer
- Leonardo Pettinari (rower) (born 1973), Italian Olympic silver medalist
- Stefano Pettinari (born 1992), Italian footballer
