= Emil Zubin =

Slovenian footballer (born 1977)

Emil
Personal information
- Full name: Emil Zubin
- Date of birth: 18 September 1977 (age 49)
- Place of birth: Koper, SFR Yugoslavia
- Height: 1.86 m (6 ft 1 in)
- Position: Striker

Senior career*
Years	Team	Apps	(Gls)
1994–1995	Pro Gorizia	18	(2)
1995–1997	Commessaggese	30	(20)
1997–1998	Lumezzane	19	(3)
1998–1999	AlbinoLeffe	14	(1)
1999–2000	Lumezzane	26	(5)
2000–2001	Biellese	29	(14)
2001–2003	Lumezzane	55	(9)
2003–2004	Ivrea	32	(12)
2004–2007	Carpenedolo	86	(33)
2007–2009	Bassano Virtus	40	(17)
2009	Carpenedolo	15	(5)
2009–2010	Itala San Marco	30	(16)
2010–2012	Venezia	43	(34)
2012–2014	Pordenone	74	(47)
2014–2015	Biancoscudati Padova	13	(8)
2015	Triestina	6	(3)
2015–2016	Monfalcone	20	(10)
2016	ASD Cordenons	12	(3)
2016–2017	Delta Rovigo	20	(5)
2017	FC Primorje		
Total		582	(247)
- * Club domestic league appearances and goals

Emil Zubin (born 18 September 1977) is a Croatian retired footballer who last played for FC Primorje. He is a centre-forward and is right footed.
