= Victor (footballer, born 1989) =

Brazilian footballer (born 1989)

Personal information
- Full name: Victor Irineu de Souza
- Date of birth: 3 April 1989 (age 37)
- Place of birth: Belo Horizonte, Brazil
- Height: 1.88 m (6 ft 2 in)
- Position: Forward

Senior career*
Years	Team	Apps	(Gls)
2007–2008	Monza	13	(6)
2008–2009	Pescara	7	(4)
2009–2010	Lecce	18	(11)
2010	Frosinone	2	(0)
2010	FC Amkar Perm	8	(0)
2010	Palmeiras	5	(0)
2012	IFK Ölme	26	(8)
2012	Karlstad BK	10	(4)
- * Club domestic league appearances and goals

Victor Irineu de Souza (born 3 April 1989), or simply Victor, is a Brazilian former footballer.

== Career ==
In September 2007, he left for Monza from Villa Nova. In January 2008, he was loaned to Pescara and in June 2008 the deal became permanent. After played two Coppa Italia matches, he was loaned to Lecce on 1 September 2008 but released by Pescara in July 2009. He was then trailed at Serie D side Colognese Calcio.

In January 2010, he left for Frosinone.
