= Matteo Negrini =

Italian footballer

Personal information
- Date of birth: 21 December 1982 (age 43)
- Place of birth: Lugo, Italy
- Height: 1.80 m (5 ft 11 in)
- Position: Winger

Senior career*
Years	Team	Apps	(Gls)
2002–2003	Argentana	?	(?)
2003–2005	Imolese	59	(5)
2005–2006	SPAL	31	(3)
2006–2010	Empoli	3	(0)
2006–2007	→ Massese (loan)	28	(1)
2007–2008	→ Pro Patria (loan)	29	(3)
2010	Ternana	8	(0)
2010–2012	Alessandria	50	(1)
- * Club domestic league appearances and goals as of 17:10, 24 September 2012 (UTC)

Matteo Negrini (born 21 December 1982) is an Italian footballer who played in the last two season for Italian fourth division club Alessandria.

== Biography ==
=== Early career ===
Born in Lugo, Romagna, Negrini started his career at Eccellenza Emilia–Romagna club Argentana. In 2003, he was signed by Imolese for 2003–04 Serie C2, also an Emilia–Romagna team. In 2005, he moved back to the Province of Ferrara (where Argentana is located) for SPAL of the provincial capital.

=== Empoli ===
In July 2006 Negrini was signed by Serie A club Empoli F.C. Negrini was loaned to Massese, another Tuscan team, for 2006–07 Serie C1. On 1 August 2007 Negrini moved to Pro Patria for 2007–08 Serie C1. Empoli relegated in 2008, Negrini returned to the club in July but only played 3 times in 2008–09 Serie B. In January 2010 Negrini transferred to Ternana. He only played 8 times in 2009–10 Lega Pro Prima Divisione.

=== Alessandria ===
Negrini was signed by Alessandria in July 2010.
