= Luca Gerbino Polo =

Italian footballer

Personal information
- Date of birth: 6 July 1987 (age 39)
- Place of birth: Italy
- Height: 1.93 m (6 ft 4 in)
- Position: Forward

Senior career*
Years	Team	Apps	(Gls)
–2006	U.S. Ponzano Calcio		
2006–2007	Ravenna		
2007–2008	Giulianova		
2008–2011	Ravenna	56+	(8+)
2011–2012	Rimini	30	(3)
2013–2014	Valsta Syrianska IK	22	(6)
2014–2016	AFC Eskilstuna	50	(15)
2016	Akropolis IF	25	(25)
2016–2017	IF Brommapojkarna	21	(3)
2017–2019	IK Frej	43	(4)
- * Club domestic league appearances and goals

Luca Gerbino Polo (born 6 July 1987) is an Italian professional footballer who last played as a forward for IK Frej in Sweden.

== Career ==
Gerbino Polo started his senior career with U.S. Ponzano Calcio. In 2008, he signed for Ravenna in the Italian Serie C, where he made over 59 appearances and scored eight goals. After that, he played for Rimini 1912, Valsta Syrianska IK, AFC Eskilstuna, Akropolis IF, IF Brommapojkarna, and IK Frej.
