= Brian Filipi =

Albanian footballer

Personal information
- Date of birth: 11 August 1989
- Place of birth: Lezhë, Albania
- Date of death: 19 September 2009 (aged 20)
- Place of death: Cervia, Italy
- Height: 1.80 m (5 ft 11 in)
- Positions: Midfielder; striker

Youth career
- Cervia
- 2007–2008: Ravenna

Senior career*
Years	Team	Apps	(Gls)
2008–2009	Ravenna	25	(7)

International career
	Albania U19	4	(0)
2008–2009	Albania U21	3	(0)
- * Club domestic league appearances and goals as of 19 September 2009

Brian Filipi (11 August 1989 – 19 September 2009) was an Albanian football midfielder/striker who spent his short professional career with Ravenna.

== Club career ==
Born in Lezhë, Brian Filipi made his first team debut with Ravenna in the 2008–09 season, being protagonist of the club's successful season which almost ended in promotion to Serie B from Lega Pro Prima Divisione, despite the Albanian's young age. Before his professional debut with Ravenna, Filipi had already played at youth international level with his native country of Albania, receiving his first call-up for the Under-19 team in 2007. He later became part of the Under-21 team as well.

In January 2009, following his impressive performances with Ravenna, he was optioned by Serie A club Palermo; however, in the 2009 summer transfer window Palermo decided not to acquire half of his registration rights, as already agreed with Ravenna, and Filipi stayed with the Emilia-Romagna club instead.

== International career ==
Filipi was part of Albania under-21 squad in the last three qualifying matches of 2009 UEFA European Under-21 Championship. He made his debut on 20 August 2008 in the match against Greece, entering in the 55th minute as the match finished 1–1. He went on to make another appearance as substitute versus Azerbaijan, as Albania finished Group 1 at 4th position with 12 points.

Filipi continued to be part of under-21 side in the opening two matches of next qualifying campaign. He played as substitute in the opening matchday against Scotland as Albania lost 0–1 at Ruzhdi Bizhuta Stadium.

== Death ==
On 19 September 2009, at around 23:00 CET, Brian Filipi was hit by a motorist while he was walking in a street in Cervia together with teammate Stefano Scappini, who suffered a minor strike on his arm in the crash. The car was driven by a 52-year-old woman who also sustained minor injuries in the event. She later travelled further to hit a number of parked vehicles in the same street. Filipi was successfully rushed to hospital, but died soon after due to the severe injuries he had sustained in the accident.

Following the events, Ravenna handed a request to delay the game scheduled for the very next day to Foggia, which was immediately accepted by the League committee.
