= Claudio Cafiero =

Italian footballer (born 1989)

Personal information
- Date of birth: September 19, 1989 (age 37)
- Height: 1.84 m (6 ft 0 in)
- Positions: Centre back; right back

Team information
- Current team: Pomezia

Youth career
- 2006–2008: Roma

Senior career*
Years	Team	Apps	(Gls)
2008–2010	Roma	0	(0)
2008–2009	→ Crotone (loan)	2	(0)
2009	→ San Marino (loan)	5	(0)
2010	Cassino	1	(0)
2010–2014	Latina	47	(5)
2013–2014	→ Aprilia (loan)	28	(3)
2014–2016	Torres	24	(1)
2016–2017	Lupa Roma	19	(0)
2017–2018	L'Aquila	33	(3)
2018–2019	Francavilla	21	(2)
2019	Campobasso	5	(0)
2019–	Pomezia	6	(1)

International career
2005–2006	Italy U-17	14	(0)
2006	Italy U-18	1	(0)
- * Club domestic league appearances and goals as of 20:28, 14 April 2020 (UTC)

Claudio Cafiero (born September 19, 1989) is an Italian professional football player who currently plays for S.S.D. Pomezia Calcio.

On 16 August 2016 he was signed by Lupa Roma F.C. on loan.
