= Nazzareno Tarantino =

Italian footballer (born 1979)

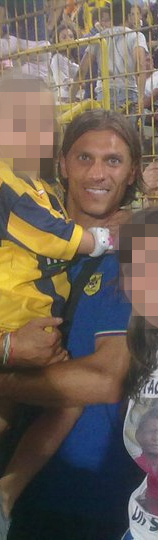

Personal information
- Date of birth: 4 January 1979 (age 47)
- Place of birth: Benevento, Italy
- Height: 1.69 m (5 ft 7 in)
- Position: Forward

Team information
- Current team: Juve Stabia (assistant coach)

Senior career*
Years	Team	Apps	(Gls)
1995–1997	Lucchese	18	(1)
1997–1998	Prato	5	(0)
1998–1999	Lucchese	19	(8)
1999–2000	Empoli	20	(0)
2000–2002	Lucchese	60	(9)
2000–2006	Crotone	75	(15)
2006–2009	Cavese	93	(12)
2009–2012	Juve Stabia	49	(8)
2012–2013	Treviso	25	(10)
2013–2014	Lucchese	29	(14)
2014–2015	Gavorrano	30	(4)
2015–2016	Camaiore		
2019–2020	Lucchese	7	(0)

Managerial career
- 2022–2023: Lucchese (youth)
- 2023–: Juve Stabia (assistant)
- * Club domestic league appearances and goals

Nazzareno Tarantino (born 4 January 1979) is an Italian football coach and a former forward. He is an assistant coach with Juve Stabia.

== Career ==
Throughout his career, he played in the Italian Serie B with Empoli, Crotone, Juve Stabia and Lucchese, just when he started playing as a professional player in the 1995–1996 season.

In 2012, he finishes his contract with Juve Stabia, and he goes to play in the Italian Serie C with the Treviso. In the summer of 2013 he returned to the Lucchese, after 11 seasons, but in the Italian Serie D.
