= Aniello Cutolo =

Italian footballer (born 1983)

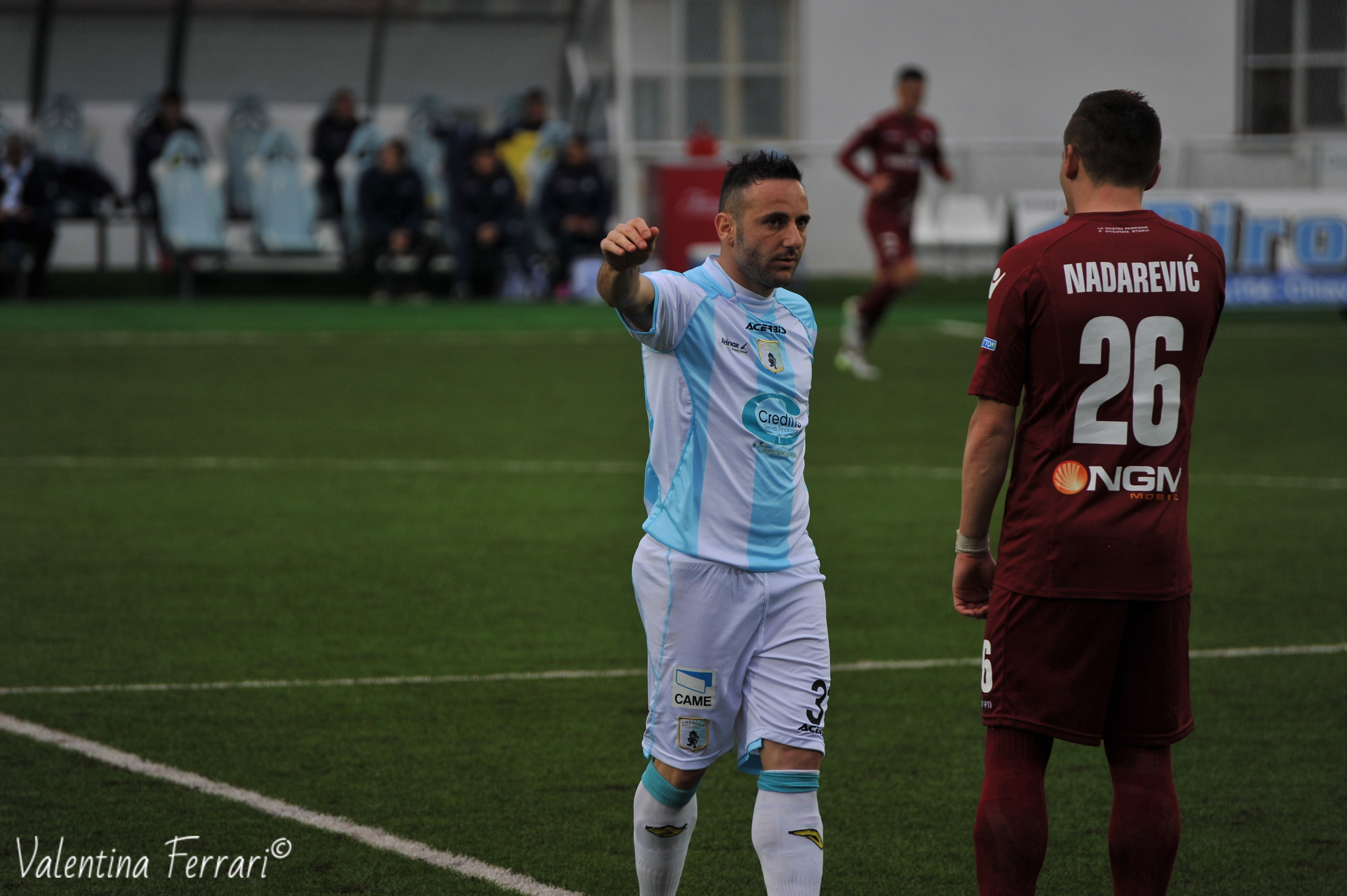

Personal information
- Date of birth: 19 May 1983 (age 43)
- Place of birth: Naples, Italy
- Height: 1.70 m (5 ft 7 in)
- Positions: Striker; attacking midfielder

Youth career
- –2000: Napoli
- 2000–2002: Benevento

Senior career*
Years	Team	Apps	(Gls)
2001–2003	Benevento	42	(2)
2003–2004	→ Giugliano (loan)	29	(8)
2004–2005	Cisco Roma	18	(10)
2005	Arezzo	10	(0)
2006–2007	Verona	31	(3)
2007–2008	Taranto	32	(13)
2008–2009	Perugia	33	(5)
2009–2011	Crotone	70	(17)
2011–2013	Padova	71	(20)
2013–2014	Pescara	28	(3)
2014–2015	Livorno	21	(6)
2015–2017	Virtus Entella	52	(5)
2017	Juve Stabia	18	(2)
2017–2022	Arezzo	150	(41)
- * Club domestic league appearances and goals

Aniello Cutolo (born 19 May 1983) is an Italian former footballer, who played as a forward or attacking midfielder, currently executive for Arezzo.
