= Leonardo Pettinari (footballer) =

Italian footballer and manager

Personal information
- Full name: Leonardo Pettinari
- Date of birth: 23 July 1986 (age 40)
- Place of birth: Prato, Italy
- Height: 1.77 m (5 ft 9 1/2 in)
- Position: Midfielder

Team information
- Current team: Fiorentina (youth coach)

Youth career
- 2004–2006: Fiorentina

Senior career*
Years	Team	Apps	(Gls)
2006–2007	Sangiovannese	19	(2)
2007–2009	Reggina	0	(0)
2008–2009	→ Ravenna (loan)	26	(3)
2009–2010	Cittadella	37	(8)
2010–2012	Atalanta	18	(2)
2012	→ Varese (loan)	6	(0)
2012–2013	Atalanta	0	(0)
Total		106	(15)

Managerial career
- 2014–2016: La Querce
- * Club domestic league appearances and goals

Leonardo Pettinari (born 23 July 1986) is an Italian retired footballer and current manager, currently in charge of the Under-15 team of Fiorentina.

== Playing career ==
Born in Prato, Tuscany, Pettinari started his career at regional capital Florence for Fiorentina. After spent 2 seasons at Primavera team. He joined Serie C1 side Sangiovannese in co-ownership deal in summer 2006. In July 2007, he was bought back by La Viola but sold to Serie A side Reggina.

He failed to play any match in Serie A before joining Lega Pro Prima Divisione side Ravenna in the 2008-09 season.

In July 2009, he joined Serie B strugglers Cittadella in a co-ownership deal, and rejoined Tommaso Bellazzini, teammate at La Viola.

On 15 July 2010, he was sold to Atalanta. He retired in the 2012–2013 season because of heart problems.

== Coaching career ==
In 2014, he became the coach of the lower league side La Querce. From 2016 to 2018, he served as a youth coach for Fiorentina. He returned to Fiorentina in 2023 to join the Viola's youth staff, taking charge of the Under-15 team.
