= 2004–05 SS Lazio season =

Lazio
2004–05 season
- Owner: Claudio Lotito
- Chairman: Claudio Lotito
- Manager: Domenico Caso; Giuseppe Papadopulo
- Serie A: 13th
- Coppa Italia: Round of 16
- UEFA Cup: Group stage
- Supercoppa Italiana: Runners-up
- Top goalscorer: League: Tommaso Rocchi (13); All: Tommaso Rocchi (17)
Home colours	Away colours	Third colours

The 2004–05 season was the 105th season in Società Sportiva Lazio's history and their 17th consecutive season in the top-flight of Italian football.

== Squad ==
Note: Flags indicate national team as defined under FIFA eligibility rules; some limited exceptions apply. Players may hold more than one non-FIFA nationality.

No.	Pos.	Nation	Player
1	GK	ITA	Angelo Peruzzi
3	DF	ARG	Leonardo Talamonti
4	DF	ESP	Óscar López
5	DF	ITA	Sebastiano Siviglia
6	MF	FRA	Ousmane Dabo
7	MF	ITA	Antonio Filippini
8	DF	ITA	Luciano Zauri
9	FW	ITA	Paolo Di Canio
10	MF	BRA	César
11	FW	ITA	Roberto Muzzi
13	MF	ITA	Dino Baggio
14	MF	ITA	Emanuele Filippini
15	GK	ITA	Fabrizio Casazza
16	MF	ITA	Giuliano Giannichedda
17	MF	CIV	Christian Manfredini
18	FW	ITA	Tommaso Rocchi

No.	Pos.	Nation	Player
19	FW	MKD	Goran Pandev
20	MF	ITA	Fabio Liverani
22	DF	ITA	Massimo Oddo
23	DF	ITA	Paolo Negro
24	DF	POR	Fernando Couto
25	DF	CRO	Anthony Šerić
26	MF	ARG	Esteban González
28	DF	ARG	Matías Lequi
29	FW	ITA	Fabio Bazzani
31	MF	ITA	Fabrizio Melara
33	GK	ITA	Matteo Sereni
34	MF	ITA	Emiliano Corsi
41	FW	ESP	Roberto Delgado
43	DF	ITA	Simone Sannibale
44	FW	ITA	Claudio De Sousa

=== Transfers ===
In
Pos.	Name	from	Type
FW	Paolo Di Canio	Charlton Athletic	
FW	Tommaso Rocchi	Empoli F.C.	
MF	Antonio Filippini	Palermo F.C.	
MF	Emanuele Filippini	Palermo F.C.	
FW	Goran Pandev	Internazionale	
DF	Leonardo Talamonti	Rosario Central	
DF	Oscar Lopez	FC Barcelona	loan
DF	Sebastiano Siviglia	Parma F.C.	loan
DF	Anthony Seric	Hellas Verona	loan
DF	Matías Lequi	Atletico Madrid	
MF	Esteban Gonzalez	Gimnasia LP	
MF	Miguel Mea Vitali	Caracas FC	
FW	Fabio Bazzani	Sampdoria	loan
MF	Gaizka Mendieta	Middlesbrough FC	loan ended
MF	Dino Baggio	AC Ancona	loan ended

Out
Pos.	Name	To	Type
DF	Jaap Stam	Milan	€10.50 million
DF	Sinisa Mihajlovic	Internazionale	
DF	Giuseppe Favalli	Internazionale	
MF	Stefano Fiore	Valencia CF	
FW	Bernardo Corradi	Valencia CF	
FW	Claudio Lopez	Club América	loan
DF	Francesco Colonnese	A.C. Siena	
MF	Gaizka Mendieta	Middlesbrough FC	
MF	Lucas Castroman	Velez Sarsfield	

==== Left club during season ====
Note: Flags indicate national team as defined under FIFA eligibility rules; some limited exceptions apply. Players may hold more than one non-FIFA nationality.

No.	Pos.	Nation	Player
—	MF	ITA	Demetrio Albertini (on loan to FC Barcelona)
—	FW	ITA	Simone Inzaghi (on loan to Sampdoria)

== Competitions ==
=== Supercoppa Italiana ===
21 August 2004	Milan	3–0	Lazio	Milan
20:45 CEST (UTC+02:00)	Shevchenko 36', 46', 76'	Report		Stadium: San Siro; Attendance: 33,274; Referee: Pierluigi Collina

=== Serie A ===
==== League table ====
Pos	Team	Pld	W	D	L	GF	GA	GD	Pts	Qualification or relegation
11	Lecce	38	10	14	14	66	73	−7	44	
12	Cagliari	38	10	14	14	51	60	−9	44	
13	Lazio (Note: Lazio gained entry to the 2005 UEFA Intertoto Cup after Messina and Livorno renounced.)	38	11	11	16	48	53	−5	44	Qualification to Intertoto Cup third round
14	Siena	38	9	16	13	44	55	−11	43	
15	Chievo	38	11	10	17	32	49	−17	43	

Source: 2004–05 Serie A, RSSSF.com, Soccerway
Rules for classification: 1) Points; 2) Head-to-head points; 3) Head-to-head goal difference; 4) Goal difference; 5) Goals scored; 6) Draw. (Note: Head-to-head record is used only after all the matches between the teams in question have been played).

==== Results summary ====
Overall								Home						Away					
Pld	W	D	L	GF	GA	GD	Pts	W	D	L	GF	GA	GD	W	D	L	GF	GA	GD
38	11	11	16	48	53	−5	44	6	6	7	26	24	+2	5	5	9	22	29	−7

==== Results by round ====
Round	1	2	3	4	5	6	7	8	9	10	11	12	13	14	15	16	17	18	19	20	21	22	23	24	25	26	27	28	29	30	31	32	33	34	35	36	37	38
Ground	A	H	A	H	A	H	A	H	A	H	A	H	H	A	H	A	H	A	H	H	A	H	A	H	A	H	A	H	A	H	A	A	H	A	H	A	H	A
Result	W	D	W	L	D	L	L	W	D	D	L	W	L	L	D	L	W	W	L	L	L	D	L	W	W	W	L	D	L	W	W	D	L	L	L	D	D	D
Position	1	2	2	4	7	11	13	8	9	9	12	6	11	14	15	15	13	10	11	14	15	15	15	15	12	11	12	14	14	10	7	7	9	10	10	10	11	13

Updated to match(es) played on 29 May 2005. Source: Competitive matches
A = Away; H = Home; W = Win; D = Draw; L = Loss

==== Matches ====
12 September 2004 1	Sampdoria	0–1	Lazio	Genoa
20:30 CEST (UTC+02:00)			Di Canio 29' (pen.)	Stadium: Stadio Luigi Ferraris; Attendance: 24,298; Referee: Roberto Rosetti

19 September 2004 2	Lazio	1–1	Reggina	Rome
15:00 CEST (UTC+02:00)	S. Inzaghi 32' (pen.)		Bonazzoli 35'	Stadium: Stadio Olimpico; Attendance: 37,773; Referee: Matteo Trefoloni

22 September 2004 3	Brescia	0–2	Lazio	Brescia
20:30 CEST (UTC+02:00)			Rocchi 29'; Couto 45'	Stadium: Stadio Mario Rigamonti; Attendance: 6,980; Referee: Salvatore Racalbuto

26 September 2004 4	Lazio	1–2	Milan	Rome
20:30 CEST (UTC+02:00)	Rocchi 37'		Shevchenko 70', 74'	Stadium: Stadio Olimpico; Attendance: 41,738; Referee: Gianluca Paparesta

3 October 2004 5	Atalanta	1–1	Lazio	Bergamo
15:00 CEST (UTC+02:00)	Gautieri 11'		Muzzi 85'	Stadium: Stadio Atleti Azzurri d'Italia; Attendance: 12,634; Referee: Pierluigi Collina

17 October 2004 6	Lazio	0–1	Chievo	Rome
15:00 CEST (UTC+02:00)			Brighi 72'	Stadium: Stadio Olimpico; Attendance: 33,112; Referee: Paolo Tagliavento

24 October 2004 7	Parma	3–1	Lazio	Parma
15:00 CEST (UTC+02:00)	Marchionni 16'; Bresciano 27'; Gilardino 64'		Rocchi 36'	Stadium: Stadio Ennio Tardini; Attendance: 11,521; Referee: Domenico Messina

27 October 2004 8	Lazio	2–0	Messina	Rome
20:30 CEST (UTC+02:00)	Manfredini 36'; De Sousa 65'			Stadium: Stadio Olimpico; Attendance: 33,078; Referee: Stefano Cassarà

30 October 2004 9	Internazionale	1–1	Lazio	Milan
20:30 CEST (UTC+02:00)	Adriano 46'		Talamonti 77'	Stadium: San Siro; Attendance: 56,016; Referee: Matteo Trefoloni

7 November 2004 10	Lazio	1–1	Siena	Rome
15:00 CET (UTC+01:00)	Couto 47'		Portanova 67'	Stadium: Stadio Olimpico; Attendance: 32,122; Referee: Nicola Rizzoli

10 November 2004 11	Livorno	1–0	Lazio	Livorno
20:30 CET (UTC+01:00)	C. Lucarelli 42'			Stadium: Stadio Armando Picchi; Attendance: 14,321; Referee: Danilo Nucini

14 November 2004 12	Lazio	2–1	Bologna	Rome
15:00 CET (UTC+01:00)	Rocchi 6'; Di Canio 85' (pen.)		Tare 53'	Stadium: Stadio Olimpico; Attendance: 31,205; Referee: Paolo Tagliavento

28 November 2004 13	Lazio	2–3	Cagliari	Rome
15:00 CET (UTC+01:00)	Pandev 7'; Oddo 80' (pen.)		Langella 34'; Esposito 65'; Zola 71'	Stadium: Stadio Olimpico; Attendance: 32,822; Referee: Nicola Ayroldi

5 December 2004 14	Juventus	2–1	Lazio	Turin
15:00 CET (UTC+01:00)	Olivera 40'; Ibrahimović 75'		Pandev 11'	Stadium: Stadio delle Alpi; Attendance: 20,787; Referee: Paolo Dondarini

11 December 2004 15	Lazio	3–3	Lecce	Rome
20:30 CET (UTC+01:00)	Rocchi 51'; Di Canio 68' (pen.), 77'		Babù 9', 75'; Bojinov 32'	Stadium: Stadio Olimpico; Attendance: 33,000; Referee: Gianluca Paparesta

19 December 2004 16	Udinese	3–0	Lazio	Udine
15:00 CET (UTC+01:00)	Pizarro 13' (pen.); Di Michele 17'; Iaquinta 36'			Stadium: Stadio Friuli; Attendance: 14,550; Referee: Daniele Tombolini

6 January 2005 17	Lazio	3–1	Roma	Rome
20:30 CET (UTC+01:00)	Di Canio 28'; César 75'; Rocchi 84'		Cassano 68'	Stadium: Stadio Olimpico; Attendance: 64,734; Referee: Paolo Dondarini

9 January 2005 18	Fiorentina	2–3	Lazio	Florence
15:00 CET (UTC+01:00)	Miccoli 1', 85'		Di Canio 33'; Pandev 64'; Dabo 75'	Stadium: Stadio Artemio Franchi; Attendance: 30,142; Referee: Nicola Rizzoli

16 January 2005 19	Lazio	1–3	Palermo	Rome
15:00 CET (UTC+01:00)	Bazzani 15'		Toni 42', 90'; Zauli 66'	Stadium: Stadio Olimpico; Attendance: 35,914; Referee: Massimiliano Saccani

23 January 2005 20	Lazio	1–2	Sampdoria	Rome
15:00 CET (UTC+01:00)	Rocchi 64'		Kutuzov 1'; Flachi 4' (pen.)	Stadium: Stadio Olimpico; Attendance: 33,716; Referee: Michele Cruciani

30 January 2005 21	Reggina	2–1	Lazio	Reggio Calabria
15:00 CET (UTC+01:00)	Bonazzoli 72'; De Rosa 90+3'		César 10'	Stadium: Stadio Oreste Granillo; Attendance: 14,622; Referee: Massimiliano Saccani

2 February 2005 22	Lazio	0–0	Brescia	Rome
20:30 CET (UTC+01:00)				Stadium: Stadio Olimpico; Attendance: 31,171; Referee: Daniele Tombolini

6 February 2005 23	Milan	2–1	Lazio	Milan
20:30 CET (UTC+01:00)	Shevchenko 72'; Crespo 90+4'		Oddo 12' (pen.)	Stadium: San Siro; Attendance: 56,845; Referee: Roberto Rosetti

12 February 2005 24	Lazio	2–1	Atalanta	Rome
18:00 CET (UTC+01:00)	Bazzani 45+1'; Liverani 89'		Makinwa 45'	Stadium: Stadio Olimpico; Attendance: 35,798; Referee: Christian Brighi

20 February 2005 25	Chievo	0–1	Lazio	Verona
15:00 CET (UTC+01:00)			Rocchi 76'	Stadium: Stadio Marcantonio Bentegodi; Attendance: 8,082; Referee: Gianluca Rocchi

27 February 2005 26	Lazio	2–0	Parma	Rome
15:00 CET (UTC+01:00)	Oddo 19'; E. Filippini 85'			Stadium: Stadio Olimpico; Attendance: 33,731; Referee: Domenico Messina

6 March 2005 27	Messina	1–0	Lazio	Messina
15:00 CET (UTC+01:00)	Coppola 44'			Stadium: Stadio San Filippo; Attendance: 33,437; Referee: Gianluca Paparesta

12 March 2005 28	Lazio	1–1	Internazionale	Rome
20:30 CET (UTC+01:00)	A. Filippini 45'		Cruz 70'	Stadium: Stadio Olimpico; Attendance: 45,000; Referee: Matteo Trefoloni

19 March 2005 29	Siena	1–0	Lazio	Siena
18:00 CET (UTC+01:00)	Tudor 57'			Stadium: Stadio Artemio Franchi; Attendance: 10,491; Referee: Daniele Tombolini

10 April 2005 30	Lazio	3–1	Livorno	Rome
15:00 CEST (UTC+02:00)	Muzzi 16'; César 45' (pen.); Rocchi 45'		Protti 60' (pen.)	Stadium: Stadio Olimpico; Attendance: 33,594; Referee: Domenico Messina

17 April 2005 31	Bologna	1–2	Lazio	Bologna
15:00 CEST (UTC+02:00)	Giunti 15'		Oddo 54' (pen.); Rocchi 74'	Stadium: Stadio Renato Dall'Ara; Attendance: 14,694; Referee: Paolo Tagliavento

20 April 2005 32	Cagliari	1–1	Lazio	Cagliari
20:30 CEST (UTC+02:00)	Esposito 72'		Siviglia 90+1'	Stadium: Stadio Sant'Elia; Attendance: 16,000; Referee: Christian Brighi

24 April 2005 33	Lazio	0–1	Juventus	Rome
20:30 CEST (UTC+02:00)			Nedvěd 85'	Stadium: Stadio Olimpico; Attendance: 45,462; Referee: Matteo Trefoloni

1 May 2005 34	Lecce	5–3	Lazio	Lecce
15:00 CEST (UTC+02:00)	Dalla Bona 5' (pen.); Vučinić 45+2', 77', 81'; Diamoutene 70' (pen.)		Rocchi 29', 52', 58'	Stadium: Stadio Via del Mare; Attendance: 21,384; Referee: Nicola Ayroldi

8 May 2005 35	Lazio	0–1	Udinese	Rome
15:00 CEST (UTC+02:00)			Iaquinta 65'	Stadium: Stadio Olimpico; Attendance: 33,604; Referee: Daniele Tombolini

15 May 2005 36	Roma	0–0	Lazio	Rome
15:00 CEST (UTC+02:00)				Stadium: Stadio Olimpico; Attendance: 64,396; Referee: Pierluigi Collina

22 May 2005 37	Lazio	1–1	Fiorentina	Rome
15:00 CEST (UTC+02:00)	Siviglia 18'		Maresca 2'	Stadium: Stadio Olimpico; Attendance: 45,221; Referee: Roberto Rosetti

29 May 2005 38	Palermo	3–3	Lazio	Palermo
15:00 CEST (UTC+02:00)	Toni 2', 64'; Brienza 40'		Rocchi 43'; Bazzani 71'; Muzzi 87'	Stadium: Stadio Renzo Barbera; Attendance: 33,074; Referee: Domenico Messina

=== Coppa Italia ===
==== Round of 16 ====
21 November 2004 First leg	Cagliari	2–1	Lazio	Cagliari
16:00 CET	Langella 35'; Zola 82' (pen.)		A. Filippini 60'	Stadium: Stadio Sant'Elia; Referee: Antonio Dattilo

13 January 2005 Second leg	Lazio	3–2 (a.e.t.) (3–3a agg.)	Cagliari	Rome
15:00 CET	A. Filippini 10'; Rocchi 64', 119'		Conti 82'; Zola 102'	Stadium: Stadio Olimpico; Attendance: 5,223; Referee: Diego Preschern

=== UEFA Cup ===
==== First round ====
16 September 2004 First leg	Metalurh Donetsk (Ukraine)	0–3	(Italy) Lazio	Donetsk, Ukraine
19:00		Report	Rocchi 72'; César 75'; Pandev 85'	Stadium: Shakhtar Stadium; Attendance: 21,000; Referee: Athanassios Briakos (Greece)

30 September 2004 Second leg	Lazio (Italy)	3–0 (6–0 agg.)	(Ukraine) Metalurh Donetsk	Rome, Italy
21:00	Liverani 10', 25'; Muzzi 22'	Report		Stadium: Stadio Olimpico; Attendance: 6,000; Referee: Paulo Costa (Portugal)

==== Group stage ====
===== Group C =====
Pos	Team	Pld	W	D	L	GF	GA	GD	Pts	Qualification
1	(England) Middlesbrough	4	3	0	1	6	2	+4	9	Advance to knockout stage
2	(Spain) Villarreal	4	2	2	0	8	2	+6	8	Advance to knockout stage
3	(Serbia and Montenegro) Partizan	4	1	2	1	7	6	+1	5	Advance to knockout stage
4	(Italy) Lazio	4	0	3	1	5	7	−2	3	
5	(Greece) Egaleo	4	0	1	3	2	11	−9	1	

Source: RSSSF

21 October 2004 1	Lazio (Italy)	1–1	(Spain) Villarreal	Rome, Italy
21:00	Rocchi 85'	Report	José Mari 4'	Stadium: Stadio Olimpico; Attendance: 23,000; Referee: Michael Weiner (Germany)

4 November 2004 2	Middlesbrough (England)	2–0	(Italy) Lazio	Middlesbrough, England
21:00	Zenden 16', 71'	Report		Stadium: Riverside Stadium; Attendance: 34,000; Referee: Yuri Baskakov (Russia)

25 November 2004 3	Lazio (Italy)	2–2	(Serbia and Montenegro) Partizan	Rome, Italy
21:00	Di Canio 52'; Inzaghi 73'	Report	Boya 6', 24'	Stadium: Stadio Olimpico; Attendance: 10,000; Referee: Anton Stredak (Slovakia)

2 December 2004 4	Egaleo (Greece)	2–2	(Italy) Lazio	Athens, Greece
20:45	Chloros 9'; Agritis 54'	Report	Muzzi 13' 36'	Stadium: Georgios Kamaras Stadium; Attendance: 1,000; Referee: Bertrand Layec (France)

== Statistics ==
=== Players statistics ===
No.	Pos	Nat	Player	Total		Serie A		Coppa		UEFA	
No.	Pos	Nat	Player	Apps	Goals	Apps	Goals	Apps	Goals	Apps	Goals
	GK	(Italy) ITA	Angelo Peruzzi	23	-30	21	−26	1	−2	1	−2
	DF	(Italy) ITA	Sebastiano Siviglia	34	2	29	2	1	0	4	0
	DF	(Italy) ITA	Massimo Oddo	41	4	34+1	4	1	0	5	0
	DF	(Portugal) POR	Fernando Couto	27	3	24	3	0	0	3	0
	DF	(Brazil) BRA	César Aparecido	26	4	16+4	3	2	0	4	1
	DM	(Italy) ITA	Antonio Filippini	41	4	30+6	2	2	2	3	0
	DM	(France) FRA	Ousmane Dabo	36	1	26+3	1	1	0	6	0
	MF	(Italy) ITA	Luciano Zauri	23	0	21	0	0	0	2	0
	MF	(Italy) ITA	Giuliano Giannichedda	36	0	31+1	0	1	0	3	0
	MF	(Italy) ITA	Emanuele Filippini	32	0	25+2	0	2	0	3	0
	FW	(Italy) ITA	Tommaso Rocchi	41	17	33+2	13	1	2	5	2
	GK	(Italy) ITA	Matteo Sereni	25	-26	16+4	−21	1	−2	4	−3
	MF	(Italy) ITA	Fabio Liverani	29	3	20+4	1	2	0	3	2
	FW	(Italy) ITA	Paolo Di Canio	29	7	14+9	6	1	0	5	1
	FW	(North Macedonia) MKD	Goran Pandev	30	4	13+12	3	1	0	4	1
	MF	(Argentina) ARG	Leonardo Talamonti	13	1	12	1	1	0		
	DF	(Argentina) ARG	Oscar López Hernández	20	0	10+4	0	2	0	4	0
	FW	(Italy) ITA	Roberto Muzzi	21	6	9+7	3	1	0	4	3
	FW	(Italy) ITA	Fabio Bazzani	16	3	8+7	3	1	0		
	MF	(Croatia) CRO	Anthony Šerić	24	0	6+11	0	1	0	6	0
	MF	(Ivory Coast) CIV	Christian Manfredini	21	1	6+10	1	1	0	4	0
	FW	(Italy) ITA	Simone Inzaghi	16	2	6+6	1	1	0	3	1
	MF	(Argentina) ARG	Matías Lequi	7	0	4+2	0	1	0		
	DF	(Argentina) ARG	Esteban Nicolás González	3	0	2+1	0				
	DF	(Italy) ITA	Paolo Negro	9	0	1+3	0	1	0	4	0
	GK	(Italy) ITA	Fabrizio Casazza	4	-8	1+2	−6	0	0	1	−2
	DF	(Brazil) BRA	Claudio De Sousa	5	1	0+4	1	1	0		
	DF	(Argentina) ARG	Alfonso Delgado	3	0	0+1	0	0	0	2	0
	MF	(Italy) ITA	Dino Baggio	0	0	0	0				
	DF	(Italy) ITA	Fabrizio Melara	1	0	0	0	0	0	1	0
	MF	(Italy) ITA	Sannibale	0	0	0	0	0	0	0	0
	MF	(Italy) ITA	E.Corsi	0	0	0	0	0	0	0	0
	DF	(Italy) ITA	Gimelli								
	MF	(Venezuela) VEN	Miguel Mea Vitali								
	DF	(Argentina) ARG	Braian Robert								
