= 2007–08 Inter Milan season =

Inter Milan
2007–08 season
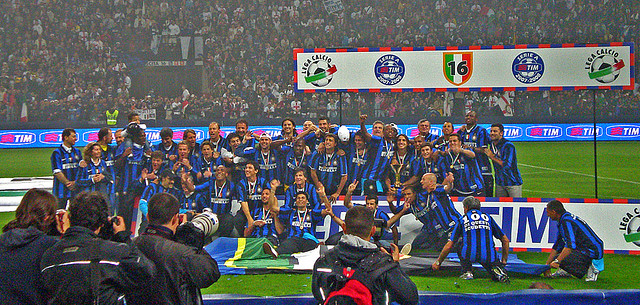
- Inter Milan players celebrating the club's 16th Scudetto
- President: Massimo Moratti
- Head coach: Roberto Mancini
- Stadium: San Siro
- Serie A: 1st
- Coppa Italia: Runners-up
- Supercoppa Italiana: Runners-up
- UEFA Champions League: Round of 16
- Top goalscorer: League: Zlatan Ibrahimović (17); All: Zlatan Ibrahimović (22)
- Highest home attendance: 78,675 vs Milan (23 December 2007)
- Lowest home attendance: 41,720 vs Catania (16 September 2007)
- Average home league attendance: 51,211
Home colours	Away colours

The 2007–08 season was Inter Milan's 99th in existence and 92nd consecutive season in the top flight of Italian football. This season marked Inter's centenary celebration on March 9, 2008. The club commemorated its foundation on the previous day with a party in San Siro, in which supporters and former players took part.

== Season overview ==
On August 19, 2007, Inter faced Roma in the Supercoppa Italiana, losing on penalties. Roberto Mancini's side celebrated its third consecutive Scudetto, finishing above Roma again, thought it was a much closer affair, with the Nerrazzuri finishing only three points above the Giallorossi. Inter clinched the title in the last match by beating Parma for 2–0. Both goals came from Zlatan Ibrahimović, who was subbed on at half-time, taking his tally to 17 goals in the league. For Parma, it was the first relegation to Serie B after 18 consecutive seasons in top flight.

In late May 2008, having lost the Coppa Italia final to Roma, Mancini was fired by Moratti. Days later, the club announced that the coach was sacked for his statement after the team second leg loss against Liverpool in the last 16 of The Champions League : this game had marked the side's elimination.

=== Centennial Kit ===
Centennial

== Players ==
=== Squad information ===
As of 18 May 2008

Squad no.	Name	Nationality	Position	Date of birth (age)
Goalkeepers
1	Francesco Toldo	(Italy)	GK	2 December 1971 (aged 35)
12	Júlio César	(Brazil)	GK	3 September 1979 (aged 27)
22	Paolo Orlandoni	(Italy)	GK	12 August 1972 (aged 34)
Defenders
2	Iván Córdoba (vice-Captain)	(Colombia)	CB	11 August 1976 (aged 30)
4	Javier Zanetti (Captain)	(Argentina)	RB / CM / RM	10 August 1973 (aged 33)
6	Maxwell	(Brazil)	LB	27 August 1981 (aged 25)
13	Maicon	(Brazil)	RB	21 July 1981 (aged 25)
16	Nicolás Burdisso	(Argentina)	CB	12 April 1981 (aged 26)
23	Marco Materazzi	(Italy)	CB	19 August 1973 (aged 33)
24	Nelson Rivas	(Colombia)	CB / RB	25 March 1983 (aged 24)
25	Walter Samuel	(Argentina)	CB	23 March 1978 (aged 29)
26	Christian Chivu	(Romania)	LB / CB / DM	26 October 1980 (aged 26)
Midfielders
5	Dejan Stanković	(Serbia)	CM / AM	11 September 1978 (aged 28)
7	Luís Figo	(Portugal)	RW / AM	4 November 1972 (aged 34)
11	Luis Jiménez	(Chile)	AM / CM / RW	17 June 1984 (aged 23)
14	Patrick Vieira	(France)	DM / CM	23 June 1976 (aged 31)
15	Olivier Dacourt	(France)	CM	25 September 1974 (aged 32)
19	Esteban Cambiasso	(Argentina)	DM	18 August 1980 (aged 26)
21	Santiago Solari	(Argentina)	LM	7 October 1976 (aged 30)
28	Maniche	(Portugal)	CM	11 November 1977 (aged 29)
30	Pelé	(Portugal)	CM / DM	14 September 1987 (aged 19)
31	César	(Brazil)	LM / LB	24 October 1974 (aged 32)
Forwards
8	Zlatan Ibrahimović	(Sweden)	CF	3 October 1981 (aged 25)
9	Julio Cruz	(Argentina)	CF	10 October 1974 (aged 32)
10	Adriano	(Brazil)	CF	17 February 1982 (aged 25)
18	Hernán Crespo	(Argentina)	CF	5 July 1975 (aged 32)
20	David Suazo	(Honduras)	CF	5 November 1979 (aged 27)
45	Mario Balotelli	(Italy)	CF	12 August 1990 (aged 16)

==== From youth squad ====
Note: Flags indicate national team as defined under FIFA eligibility rules; some limited exceptions apply. Players may hold more than one non-FIFA nationality.

No.	Pos.	Nation	Player
17	FW	ITA	Filippo Mancini
35	DF	ITA	Dennis Esposito
36	MF	ITA	Francesco Bolzoni
37	DF	ITA	Gabriele Puccio
40	DF	MNE	Ivan Fatić

No.	Pos.	Nation	Player
42	MF	BEL	Ibrahim Maaroufi
46	FW	ITA	Aiman Napoli
47	DF	ITA	Marco Filippini
50	MF	ITA	Luca Siligardi
71	GK	ITA	Enrico Alfonso

== Transfers ==
=== In ===
Transfers
Player in	From	Fee	Type
(Honduras) David Suazo	Cagliari	€10,000,000	Full ownership
(Brazil) César	Livorno	Loan Return	
(Colombia) Nelson Rivas	River Plate	Full ownership	
(Chile) Luis Jiménez	Ternana	Loan	
(Romania) Cristian Chivu	Roma	€16,000,000	Full ownership
(Italy) Enrico Alfonso	Pizzighettone	Co-ownership	
(Portugal) Pelé	Vitória de Guimarães	Full ownership	
(Argentina) Hernán Crespo	Chelsea	Renew Loan	
(Italy) Francesco Coco	Torino	Loan Return	
(Portugal) Maniche	Atlético Madrid	Loan	

=== Out ===
Transfers
Player out	To	Fee	Type
(Uruguay) Álvaro Recoba	Torino	Loan	
(Chile) David Pizarro	Roma	€5,750,000	Co-ownership Termination
(Italy) Fabio Grosso	Lyon	€7,000,000	Full ownership
(Italy) Marco Andreolli	Roma	€3,000,000	Co-ownership
(Uruguay) Fabián Carini	Real Murcia	Contract expired	
(Argentina) Mariano González	Palermo	Loan End	
(Greece) Lampros Choutos	Free agent	contract expired	
(Italy) Francesco Coco	Free agent	contract expired	
(Romania) Ianis Zicu	Dinamo București	Unknown	Full ownership
(Brazil) Adriano	São Paulo	Loan	

== Club ==
=== Non-playing staff ===
Position	Staff
Head coach	(Italy) Roberto Mancini
Assistant coach	(Serbia) Siniša Mihajlović
Technical Assistant	(Italy) Fausto Salsano
Goalkeeper coach	(Italy) Giulio Nuciari
Chief Athletic Trainer	(Italy) Ivan Carminati
Athletic Trainer	(Italy) Gian Nicola Bisciotti
Athletic Trainer	(Italy) Claudio Gaudino
First-team Doctor	(Italy) Franco Combi
First-team Doctor	(Italy) Giorgio Panico
Masseurs/Physiotherapists	(Italy) Marco Dellacasa
Masseurs/Physiotherapists	(Italy) Massimo Dellacasa
Masseurs/Physiotherapists	(Italy) Andrea Galli
Masseurs/Physiotherapists	(Italy) Luigi Sessolo
Masseurs/Physiotherapists	(Italy) Alberto Galbiati
Masseurs/Physiotherapists	(Italy) Sergio Viganó
Director in charge of transfers	(Italy) Marco Branca
Transfer Market Consultant; First-Team Representative	(Italy) Gabriele Oriali

Last updated: 15 Aug 2007
Source: F.C. Internazionale Milano Official Website

== Pre-season and friendlies ==
=== Riscone di Brunico training camp ===
17 July 2007 Friendly	Inter Milan	3–0	China Olympics Team	Bruneck
16:30 CET	Cruz 34' (pen.); Solari 59'; Adriano 60'			Stadium: Riscone di Brunico

21 July 2007 Friendly	Inter Milan	2–0	Südtirol	Bruneck
16:30 CET	Cruz 37'; Balotelli 49'			Stadium: Riscone di Brunico

=== Emirates Cup ===
28 July 2007 Friendly	Inter Milan	0–2	Valencia	London, England
14:30 BST		Report	Gavilán 13'; Villa 39'	Stadium: Emirates Stadium; Attendance: 55,106; Referee: Alan Kelly

29 July 2007 Friendly	Arsenal	2–1	Inter Milan	London, England
16:15 BST	Hleb 67'; Van Persie 85'	Report	Suazo 62'	Stadium: Emirates Stadium; Attendance: 59,821; Referee: Mark Halsey

=== Birra Moretti Trophy ===
11 August 2007 Friendly	Napoli	0–2	Inter Milan	Naples
21:30 CEST			Stanković 20'; Suazo 21'	Stadium: Stadio San Paolo; Attendance: 60,000; Referee: Antonio Giannoccaro

11 August 2007 Friendly	Juventus	0–1	Inter Milan	Naples
22:30 CEST			César 2'	Stadium: Stadio San Paolo; Attendance: 60,000; Referee: Gianluca Rocchi

=== TIM Trophy ===
14 August 2007 Friendly	Inter Milan	0–0 (5–4 p)	Juventus	Milan
21:00 CEST		Report		Stadium: San Siro; Attendance: 25,280; Referee: Domenico Celi
	Penalties
	Jiménez (penalty scored); Cruz (penalty scored); Samuel (penalty scored); César (penalty scored); Burdisso (penalty scored)		(penalty missed) Criscito; (penalty scored) Iaquinta; (penalty scored) Andrade; (penalty scored) Salihamidžić; (penalty scored) Del Piero

14 August 2007 Friendly	Inter Milan	1–0	Milan	Milan
23:00 CEST	Recoba 28'	Report		Stadium: San Siro; Attendance: 25,280; Referee: Antonio Damato

=== Other friendlies ===
24 July 2007 Friendly	Inter Milan	1–0	Partizan	Bolzano
19:45 CET	Ibrahimović 19'			Stadium: Stadio Druso

1 August 2007 Pirelli Cup	Manchester United	2–3	Inter Milan	Manchester, England
19:45 CET	Rooney 17'; Adriano 57' (o.g.)	Report	Suazo 21', 34'; Ibrahimović 27'	Stadium: Old Trafford; Attendance: 73,738; Referee: Mike Dean

4 August 2007 Friendly	Aston Villa	3–0	Inter Milan	Aston, England
21:00 CET	Barry 14' (pen.), 68'; Laursen 48'	Report		Stadium: Villa Park; Referee: Uriah Rennie

11 August 2007 Friendly	AZ Alkmaar	4–2	Inter Milan	Alkmaar, Netherlands
17:00 CET	Cziommer 10', 49'; Steinsson 27'; Ari 55'	Report	Stanković 30'; Cruz 75'	Stadium: AFAS Stadion; Referee: Pieter Vink

29 August 2007 Joan Gamper Trophy	Barcelona	5–0	Inter Milan	Barcelona, Spain
21:00 CET	Ronaldinho 7' (pen.); Van Bronckhorst 12'; Touré 37'; Iniesta 56'; Motta 79'	Report		Stadium: Camp Nou; Attendance: 90,000; Referee: Eduardo Iturralde Gonzalez

== Competitions ==
=== Overview ===
Competition	First match	Last match	Starting round	Final position	Record							
Competition	First match	Last match	Starting round	Final position	Pld	W	D	L	GF	GA	GD	Win %
Serie A	26 August 2007	18 May 2008	Matchday 1	Winners	38	25	10	3	69	26	+43	65.79
Coppa Italia	19 December 2007	24 May 2008	Round of 16	Runners-up	7	4	2	1	15	7	+8	57.14
Supercoppa Italiana	19 August 2007		Final	Runners-up	1	0	0	1	0	1	−1	0.00
Champions League	18 September 2007	11 March 2008	Group stage	Round of 16	8	5	0	3	12	7	+5	62.50
Total					54	34	12	8	96	41	+55	62.96

Last updated: 28 May 2008
Source: Serie A statistics, Coppa Italia statistics, UEFA Champions League statistics

=== Serie A ===
==== League table ====
Pos	Team	Pld	W	D	L	GF	GA	GD	Pts	Qualification or relegation
1	Internazionale (C)	38	25	10	3	69	26	+43	85	Qualification to Champions League group stage
2	Roma	38	24	10	4	72	37	+35	82	Qualification to Champions League group stage
3	Juventus	38	20	12	6	72	37	+35	72	Qualification to Champions League third qualifying round
4	Fiorentina	38	19	9	10	55	39	+16	66	Qualification to Champions League third qualifying round
5	Milan	38	18	10	10	66	38	+28	64	Qualification to UEFA Cup first round (Note: The 7th-placed team qualified for the UEFA Cup due to both of the Coppa Italia finalists, Roma and Internazionale, finishing 6th or higher.)

Source: Serie A
Rules for classification: 1) points; 2) head-to-head points; 3) head-to-head goal difference; 4) head-to-head goals scored; 5) goal difference; 6) number of goals scored.
(C) Champions

==== Results summary ====
Overall								Home						Away					
Pld	W	D	L	GF	GA	GD	Pts	W	D	L	GF	GA	GD	W	D	L	GF	GA	GD
38	25	10	3	69	26	+43	85	15	3	1	41	14	+27	10	7	2	28	12	+16

Last updated: 18 May 2008.
Source: Internazionale Milano

==== Results by round ====
Round	1	2	3	4	5	6	7	8	9	10	11	12	13	14	15	16	17	18	19	20	21	22	23	24	25	26	27	28	29	30	31	32	33	34	35	36	37	38
Ground	H	A	H	A	H	A	H	A	A	H	A	H	H	A	H	A	H	A	H	A	H	A	H	A	H	A	H	H	A	H	A	A	H	A	H	A	H	A
Result	D	W	W	D	W	W	W	W	D	W	D	W	W	W	W	W	W	W	W	D	W	W	W	D	D	L	W	W	D	L	D	W	W	W	W	L	D	W
Position	7	5	4	6	1	1	1	1	1	1	1	1	1	1	1	1	1	1	1	1	1	1	1	1	1	1	1	1	1	1	1	1	1	1	1	1	1	1

Updated to match(es) played on 18 May 2008. Source: Competitive Matches
A = Away; H = Home; W = Win; D = Draw; L = Loss

==== Matches ====
26 August 2007 1	Inter Milan	1–1	Udinese	Milan
15:00 CET	Stanković 9'; Maicon (yellow card) 30'; Júlio César (red card) 57'; Maxwell (yellow card) 85'	Report	Sivok (yellow card) 34'; Inler (yellow card) 50'; Córdoba 90+2' (o.g.)	Stadium: San Siro; Attendance: 42,707; Referee: Luca Banti

1 September 2007 2	Empoli	0–2	Inter Milan	Empoli
20:30 CET	Giacomazzi (yellow card) 25'; Marzorati (yellow card) 64'	Report	Ibrahimović 14', 83'; Rodrigues (yellow card) 29'	Stadium: Stadio Carlo Castellani; Attendance: 16,326; Referee: Nicola Ayroldi

16 September 2007 3	Inter Milan	2–0	Catania	Milan
15:00 CET	Crespo 6'; Burdisso (yellow card) 38'; César 83'	Report	Baiocco (yellow card) 23'	Stadium: San Siro; Attendance: 41,720; Referee: Daniele Orsato

23 September 2007 4	Livorno	2–2	Inter Milan	Livorno
15:00 CET	De Vezze 1'; Pavan (yellow card) 14'; Knežević (yellow card) 36'; Loviso 62' (pen.); Galante (yellow card) 74'; Bogdani (yellow card) 86'	Report	Maxwell (yellow card) 17'; Ibrahimović 35', 71' (pen.); Cambiasso (yellow card) 62'; Maicon (red card) 80'	Stadium: Stadio Armando Picchi; Attendance: 11,922; Referee: Matteo Trefoloni

26 September 2007 5	Inter Milan	3–0	Sampdoria	Milan
20:30 CET	Ibrahimović 23', 49' (yellow card) 56'; Figo 58'	Report	Ziegler (yellow card) 70'	Stadium: San Siro; Attendance: 42,013; Referee: Paolo Tagliavento

29 September 2007 6	Roma	1–4	Inter Milan	Rome
18:00 CET	Giuly (red card) 28'; Perrotta 53'; Pizarro (yellow card) 73'	Report	Ibrahimović 29' (pen.); Samuel (yellow card) 45'; Crespo 57'; Cruz 60'; Córdoba 68'	Stadium: Stadio Olimpico; Attendance: 51,150; Referee: Nicola Rizzoli

6 October 2007 7	Inter Milan	2–1	Napoli	Milan
20:30 CET	Samuel (yellow card) 18'; Cruz 20', 35'; Stanković (yellow card) 36'	Report	Cannavaro (yellow card) 40'; Bogliacino (yellow card) 47'; Sosa 85'; Garics (yellow card) 89'; Contini (yellow card) 90'	Stadium: San Siro; Attendance: 46,536; Referee: Roberto Rosetti

20 October 2007 8	Reggina	0–1	Inter Milan	Reggio Calabria
20:30 CET	Aronica (yellow card) 36'; Cozza (yellow card) 41'	Report	Adriano 18'; Cruz (yellow card) 43'; Vieira (yellow card) 68'; Ibrahimović (yellow card) 90+1'	Stadium: Stadio Oreste Granillo; Attendance: 16,965; Referee: Mauro Bergonzi

28 October 2007 9	Palermo	0–0	Inter Milan	Palermo
15:00 CET	Caserta (yellow card) 38'; Simplício (yellow card) 80'	Report	Samuel (yellow card) 59'	Stadium: Stadio Renzo Barbera; Attendance: 33,972; Referee: Stefano Farina

31 October 2007 10	Inter Milan	4–1	Genoa	Milan
20:30 CET	Córdoba 8'; Figo (yellow card) 42'; Cambiasso 50'; Suazo 74'; Cruz 88'	Report	Milanetto (yellow card) 42'; Konko 73'; Rubinho (yellow card) 87'	Stadium: San Siro; Attendance: 47,230; Referee: Paolo Tagliavento

4 November 2007 11	Juventus	1–1	Inter Milan	Turin
20:45 CET	Nocerino (yellow card) 9'; Nedvěd (yellow card) 56'; Camoranesi 77'	Report	Figo (yellow card) 18'; Cruz 41'; Burdisso (yellow card) 66'	Stadium: Stadio delle Alpi; Attendance: 22,722; Referee: Gianluca Rocchi

5 December 2007 (Note: The match was originally scheduled to be played on 11 November 2007 at 15:00 but it was postponed due to the murder of Gabriele Sandri.) 12	Inter Milan	3–0	Lazio	Milan
20:30 CET	Ibrahimović 22' (pen.); Maicon 33'; Suazo 55'; Samuel (yellow card) 67'	Report	Stendardo (yellow card) 22'; Zauri (yellow card) 57'; Ledesma (yellow card) 60'	Stadium: San Siro; Attendance: 44,667; Referee: Antonio Damato

24 November 2007 13	Inter Milan	2–1	Atalanta	Milan
20:30 CET	Suazo 11'; Cruz 30'; Chivu (yellow card) 81'	Report	Carrozzieri (yellow card) 15'; Floccari 39'; Manfredini (yellow card) 60'; Inzaghi (yellow card) 86' (yellow-red card) 90+1'	Stadium: San Siro; Attendance: 43,190; Referee: Luca Banti

2 December 2007 14	Fiorentina	0–2	Inter Milan	Florence
15:00 CET	Potenza (yellow card) 70'	Report	Jiménez 10'; Chivu (yellow card) 31'; Cambiasso (yellow card) 44'; Cruz 45'; Maicon (yellow card) 63'	Stadium: Stadio Artemio Franchi; Attendance: 42,449; Referee: Stefano Farina

9 December 2007 15	Inter Milan	4–0	Torino	Milan
15:00 CET	Ibrahimović 38' (pen.) (yellow card) 60'; Cruz 50'; Jiménez 52'; Córdoba 76'	Report	Rosina (yellow card) 28'; Zanetti (yellow card) 53'; Lanna	Stadium: San Siro; Attendance: 46,148; Referee: Massimiliano Saccani

16 December 2007 16	Cagliari	0–2	Inter Milan	Cagliari
20:30 CET	Parola (yellow card) 29'; Conti (yellow card) 75'	Report	Cruz 57'; Suazo 79'	Stadium: Stadio Sant'Elia; Attendance: 22,877; Referee: Marco De Andrea

23 December 2007 17	Inter Milan	2–1	Milan	Milan
15:00 CET	Córdoba (yellow card) 16'; Cruz 36' (yellow card) 52'; Jiménez (yellow card) 38'; Materazzi (yellow card) 40'; Cambiasso 63'	Report	Pirlo (yellow card) 11' (goal) 18'; Gattuso (yellow card) 22'; Ambrosini (yellow card) 45'	Stadium: San Siro; Attendance: 78,675; Referee: Emidio Morganti

13 January 2008 18	Siena	2–3	Inter Milan	Siena
15:00 CET	Córdoba 31' (o.g.); Galloppa (yellow card) 48'; Forestieri 90+2'	Report	Ibrahimović 26' (pen.), 52'; Cambiasso 45+1'; Júlio César (yellow card) 57'; Chivu (yellow card) 82'	Stadium: Stadio Artemio Franchi – Montepaschi Arena; Attendance: 14,682; Referee: Oscar Girardi

20 January 2008 19	Inter Milan	3–2	Parma	Milan
20:30 CET	Cambiasso 30'; Córdoba (yellow card) 45+2'; Jiménez (yellow card) 84'; Ibrahimović 88' (pen.), 90+3'	Report	Cigarini (yellow card) 34' (goal) 40'; Gasbarroni 69' (yellow card) 88'; Lucarelli (yellow card) 77'; Couto (red card) 87'	Stadium: San Siro; Attendance: 43,413; Referee: Andrea Gervasoni

27 January 2008 20	Udinese	0–0	Inter Milan	Udine
15:00 CET	Quagliarella (yellow card) 49'	Report	César (yellow card) 21' (yellow-red card) 21'; Ibrahimović (yellow card) 32'	Stadium: Stadio Friuli; Attendance: 21,913; Referee: Roberto Rosetti

3 February 2008 21	Inter Milan	1–0	Empoli	Milan
15:00 CET	Ibrahimović 34'; Vieira (yellow card) 39' (yellow-red card) 39'; Cambiasso (yellow card) 53'; Júlio César (yellow card) 74'	Report	Vannucchi (yellow card) 33'; Abate (yellow card) 65'; Piccolo (yellow card) 71'; Pozzi (yellow card) 80'; Saudati (yellow card) 90+1'	Stadium: San Siro; Attendance: 43,946; Referee: Paolo Tagliavento

10 February 2008 22	Catania	0–2	Inter Milan	Catania
20:30 CET	Vargas (yellow card) 43'; Spinesi (yellow card) 56'; Mascara (yellow card) 62'; Silvestri (yellow card) 90+1'	Report	Córdoba (yellow card) 36'; Cambiasso 64'; Pelé (yellow card) 69'; Suazo 87'	Stadium: Stadio Angelo Massimino; Attendance: 21,068; Referee: Stefano Farina

16 February 2008 23	Inter Milan	2–0	Livorno	Milan
16:00 CET	Suazo 14', 18'	Report	Balleri (yellow card) 45'; Pulzetti (yellow card) 54'	Stadium: San Siro; Attendance: 45,276; Referee: Marco De Andrea

24 February 2008 24	Sampdoria	1–1	Inter Milan	Genoa
15:00 CET	Cassano 65'	Report	Vieira (yellow card) 11'; Materazzi (yellow card) 42'; Rivas (yellow card) 73'; Crespo 76'	Stadium: Stadio Luigi Ferraris; Attendance: 26,306; Referee: Gianluca Rocchi

27 February 2008 25	Inter Milan	1–1	Roma	Milan
20:30 CET	Burdisso (yellow card) 51'; Zanetti 88'; Balotelli (yellow card) 90+1'	Report	Totti 38'; Taddei (yellow card) 58'; Mexès (yellow card) 82' (yellow-red card) 84'; Perrotta (yellow card) 90+4'	Stadium: San Siro; Attendance: 48,717; Referee: Roberto Rosetti

2 March 2008 26	Napoli	1–0	Inter Milan	Naples
20:30 CET	Zalayeta 3'; Santacroce (yellow card) 53'; Blasi (yellow card) 66'; Mannini (yellow card) 80'; Contini (yellow card) 86'	Report	Chivu (yellow card) 16'; Júlio César (yellow card) 74'; Rivas (yellow card) 90+2'	Stadium: Stadio San Paolo; Attendance: 53,818; Referee: Nicola Rizzoli

8 March 2008 27	Inter Milan	2–0	Reggina	Milan
18:00 CET	Ibrahimović 14' (pen.); Burdisso 34'; Figo (yellow card) 74'	Report	Missiroli (yellow card) 22'; Cirillo (yellow card) 52'; Tognozzi (yellow card) 63'; Aronica (yellow card) 78'	Stadium: San Siro; Attendance: 64,575; Referee: Christian Brighi

16 March 2008 28	Inter Milan	2–1	Palermo	Milan
15:00 CET	Vieira 5'; Jiménez 36'; Crespo (yellow card) 81'; Materazzi (yellow card) 88'	Report	Migliaccio (yellow card) 22'; Materazzi 25' (o.g.); Guana (yellow card) 37'; Rinaudo (yellow card) 77'	Stadium: San Siro; Attendance: 49,360; Referee: Andrea De Marco

19 March 2008 29	Genoa	1–1	Inter Milan	Genoa
20:30 CET	Jurić (yellow card) 40'; Milanetto (yellow card) 54'; Borriello 85'	Report	Suazo 11'; Pelé (yellow card) 34' (yellow-red card) 40'; Burdisso (yellow card) 70'; Cruz (yellow card) 87'	Stadium: Stadio Luigi Ferraris; Attendance: 27,624; Referee: Gianluca Rocchi

22 March 2008 30	Inter Milan	1–2	Juventus	Milan
20:30 CET	Cruz (yellow card) 29'; Chivu (yellow card) 32'; Maniche 83'; Burdisso (yellow card) 86'	Report	Molinaro (yellow card) 25'; Legrottaglie (yellow card) 43'; Camoranesi 49'; Trezeguet 63'	Stadium: San Siro; Attendance: 58,049; Referee: Stefano Farina

29 March 2008 31	Lazio	1–1	Inter Milan	Rome
20:30 CET	Rocchi 59'; Dabo (yellow card) 68'; Behrami (yellow card) 86'	Report	Crespo 11'; Jiménez (yellow card) 75'	Stadium: Stadio Olimpico; Attendance: 32,802; Referee: Roberto Rosetti

6 April 2008 32	Atalanta	0–2	Inter Milan	Bergamo
15:00 CET	Tissone (yellow card) 65'; Doni (yellow card) 83' (yellow-red card) 90+3'	Report	Vieira 21'; Balotelli (yellow card) 60' (goal) 74'; Maicon (yellow card) 68'	Stadium: Stadio Atleti Azzurri d'Italia; Attendance: 19,081; Referee: Andrea De Marco

13 April 2008 33	Inter Milan	2–0	Fiorentina	Milan
20:30 CET	Vieira (yellow card) 51'; Cambiasso 55'; Balotelli 62' (yellow card) 66'	Report	Gamberini (yellow card) 45'	Stadium: San Siro; Attendance: 53,483; Referee: Massimilano Saccani

20 April 2008 34	Torino	0–1	Inter Milan	Turin
20:30 CET	Corini (yellow card) 25'; Stellone (yellow card) 43'; Motta (yellow card) 62'; Grella (yellow card) 69'; Pisano (yellow card) 86'; Bottone (yellow card) 89'	Report	Cruz 30'; Chivu (yellow card) 82'; Stanković (yellow card) 86'; Burdisso (yellow card) 90+1'	Stadium: Stadio Olimpico Grande Torino; Attendance: 21,865; Referee: Emidio Morganti

27 April 2008 35	Inter Milan	2–1	Cagliari	Milan
15:00 CET	Cruz 22'; Materazzi 82'	Report	Del Grosso (yellow card) 41'; López (yellow card) 51'; Biondini 90+1'	Stadium: San Siro; Attendance: 56,676; Referee: Daniele Orsato

4 May 2008 36	Milan	2–1	Inter Milan	Milan
15:00 CET	F. Inzaghi 51'; Kaká 56'; Pirlo (yellow card) 72'; Ambrosini (yellow card) 75'; Bonera (yellow card) 78'; Jankulovski (yellow card) 90+4'	Report	Rivas (yellow card) 16'; Materazzi (yellow card) 89'; Chivu (yellow card) 89'; Cruz 76'	Stadium: San Siro; Attendance: 81,766; Referee: Roberto Rosetti

11 May 2008 37	Inter Milan	2–2	Siena	Milan
15:00 CET	Vieira 12'; Materazzi (yellow card) 29'; Balotelli 45'	Report	Maccarone 30'; Ficagna (yellow card) 42'; Kharja (yellow card) 53' (goal) 69'; Coppola (yellow card) 58'; Vergassola (yellow card) 60'; Riganò (yellow card) 78'	Stadium: San Siro; Attendance: 76,633; Referee: Gabriele Gava

18 May 2008 38	Parma	0–2	Inter Milan	Parma
15:00 CET	Parravicini (yellow card) 15'; Cigarini (yellow card) 43'; Castellini (yellow card) 67'; Lucarelli (yellow card) 88'	Report	César (yellow card) 25'; Vieira (yellow card) 36'; Ibrahimović 62', 79' (yellow card) 62'	Stadium: Stadio Ennio Tardini; Attendance: 25,149; Referee: Gianluca Rocchi

=== Coppa Italia ===
==== Round of 16 ====
16 December 2007 First leg	Reggina	1–4	Inter Milan	Reggio Calabria
20:45 CET	Pettinari 50'	Report	Crespo 14'; Balotelli 30', 85'; Solari 61'	Stadium: Stadio Oreste Granillo; Referee: Matteo Trefoloni

17 January 2008 Second leg	Inter Milan	3–0 (7–1 agg.)	Reggina	Milan
18:00 CET	Crespo 34'; Cascione 45' (o.g.); César 90'	Report		Stadium: San Siro; Referee: Denis Salati

==== Quarter-finals ====
23 January 2008 First leg	Inter Milan	2–2	Juventus	Milan
21:00 CET	Cruz 54', 74'	Report	Del Piero 79'; Boumsong 85'	Stadium: San Siro; Referee: Stefano Farina

30 January 2008 Second leg	Juventus	2–3 (4–5 agg.)	Inter Milan	Turin
21:00 CET	Del Piero 14'; Iaquinta 31'	Report	Balotelli 10', 53'; Cruz 39' (pen.)	Stadium: Stadio Olimpico Grande Torino; Referee: Massimiliano Saccani

==== Semi-finals ====
16 April 2008 First leg	Inter Milan	0–0	Lazio	Milan
20:30 CET		Report		Stadium: San Siro; Referee: Gianluca Rocchi

7 May 2008 Second leg	Lazio	0–2 (0–2 agg.)	Inter Milan	Rome
20:30 CET		Report	Pelé 51'; Cruz 85'	Stadium: Stadio Olimpico; Referee: Massimiliano Saccani

==== Final ====
24 May 2008 Final	Roma	2–1	Inter Milan	Rome
20:45 CET	Mexès 36'; Perrotta 54' (yellow card) 55'; Vučinić (yellow card) 73'	Report	Toldo (yellow card) 54'; Pelé 60' (yellow card) 86'; Vieira (yellow card) 61'; Burdisso (yellow card) 73'	Stadium: Stadio Olimpico; Attendance: 60,000; Referee: Emidio Morganti

=== Supercoppa Italiana ===
19 August 2007	Inter Milan	0–1	Roma	Milan
20:45 CET		Report	De Rossi 78' (pen.)	Stadium: San Siro; Attendance: 34,898; Referee: Roberto Rosetti

=== UEFA Champions League ===
==== Group stage ====
Pos	Team	Pld	W	D	L	GF	GA	GD	Pts	Qualification	INT	FEN	PSV	CSKA
1	(Italy) Internazionale	6	5	0	1	12	4	+8	15	Advance to knockout stage	—	3–0	2–0	4–2
2	(Turkey) Fenerbahçe	6	3	2	1	8	6	+2	11	Advance to knockout stage	1–0	—	2–0	3–1
3	(Netherlands) PSV Eindhoven	6	2	1	3	3	6	−3	7	Transfer to UEFA Cup	0–1	0–0	—	2–1
4	(Russia) CSKA Moscow	6	0	1	5	7	14	−7	1		1–2	2–2	0–1	—

Source: RSSSF

19 September 2007 1	Fenerbahçe (Turkey)	1–0	(Italy) Inter Milan	Istanbul, Turkey
20:45 CET	Turacı (yellow card) 12'; Lugano (yellow card) 31'; Deivid 43' (yellow card) 45+1'	Report	Ibrahimović (yellow card) 15'; Samuel (yellow card) 52'; Jiménez (yellow card) 90+2'	Stadium: Şükrü Saracoğlu Stadium; Attendance: 44,212; Referee: Luis Medina Cantalejo (Spain)

2 October 2007 2	Inter Milan (Italy)	2–0	(Netherlands) PSV Eindhoven	Milan, Italy
20:45 CET	Ibrahimović 15' (pen.), 31'; Chivu (yellow card) 29' (yellow-red card) 65'; Suazo (red card) 90+3'	Report	Lazović (yellow card) 15'; Culina (yellow card) 85'	Stadium: San Siro; Attendance: 23,882; Referee: Kyros Vassaras (Greece)

23 October 2007 3	CSKA Moscow (Russia)	1–2	(Italy) Inter Milan	Moscow, Russia
20:45 CET	Jô 32'; Carvalho (yellow card) 61'	Report	Figo (yellow card) 43'; Ibrahimović (yellow card) 46'; Crespo 52'; Samuel 80'; Solari (yellow card) 83'	Stadium: Lokomotiv Stadium; Attendance: 24,000; Referee: Mike Riley (England)

7 November 2007 4	Inter Milan (Italy)	4–2	(Russia) CSKA Moscow	Milan, Italy
20:45 CET	Ibrahimović 32', 75'; Cambiasso 34', 67'; Dacourt (yellow card) 84'	Report	Jô 23'; Love 31'; Rahimić (yellow card) 39'; Dudu (yellow card) 45'; Berezutski (yellow card) 65'; Zhirkov (yellow card) 72'	Stadium: San Siro; Attendance: 17,495; Referee: Paul Allaerts (Belgium)

27 November 2007 5	Inter Milan (Italy)	3–0	(Turkey) Fenerbahçe	Milan, Italy
20:45 CET	Cruz 55'; Ibrahimović 66' (yellow card) 76'; Jiménez 90+2'	Report	Lugano (yellow card) 50'; Gönül (yellow card) 78'	Stadium: San Siro; Attendance: 24,736; Referee: Konrad Plautz (Austria)

12 December 2007 6	PSV Eindhoven (Netherlands)	0–1	(Italy) Inter Milan	Eindhoven, Netherlands
20:45 CET	Méndez (red card) 28'	Report	Cruz 64'	Stadium: Philips Stadion; Attendance: 35,000; Referee: Markus Merk (Germany)

==== Knockout phase ====
===== Round of 16 =====
19 February 2008 First leg	Liverpool (England)	2–0	(Italy) Inter Milan	Liverpool, England
20:45 CET	Kuyt 85'; Gerrard 90'	Report	Chivu (yellow card) 4'; Materazzi (red card) 30'	Stadium: Anfield; Attendance: 41,999; Referee: Frank De Bleeckere (Belgium)

11 March 2008 Second leg	Inter Milan (Italy)	0–1 (0–3 agg.)	(England) Liverpool	Milan, Italy
20:45 CET	Burdisso (yellow card) 34' (yellow-red card); Rivas (yellow card) 59'; Stanković (yellow card) 73'; Chivu (yellow card) 85'	Report	Babel (yellow card) 12'; Gerrard (yellow card) 47'; Aurélio (yellow card) 56'; Torres 64'; Benayoun (yellow card) 74'	Stadium: San Siro; Attendance: 80,000; Referee: Tom Henning Øvrebø (Norway)

== Statistics ==
=== Players statistics ===
No.	Pos	Nat	Player	Total		Serie A		Champions League	
No.	Pos	Nat	Player	Apps	Goals	Apps	Goals	Apps	Goals
12	GK	(Brazil) BRA	Júlio César	43	-31	35	-24	8	-7
13	DF	(Brazil) BRA	Maicon	35	1	31	1	4	0
16	DF	(Argentina) ARG	Burdisso	26	1	20+4	1	1+1	0
2	DF	(Colombia) COL	Cordoba	25	3	20	3	5	0
26	DF	(Romania) ROU	Chivu	32	0	23+3	0	6	0
6	DF	(Brazil) BRA	Maxwell	39	0	27+5	0	7	0
4	MF	(Argentina) ARG	Zanetti J	46	1	35+3	1	7+1	0
19	MF	(Argentina) ARG	Cambiasso	41	8	33	6	7+1	2
5	MF	(Serbia) SRB	Stankovic	27	1	19+2	1	5+1	0
8	FW	(Sweden) SWE	Ibrahimovic	33	22	22+4	17	7	5
9	FW	(Argentina) ARG	Julio Cruz	34	15	22+6	13	4+2	2
1	GK	(Italy) ITA	Toldo	3	-1	2+1	-1	0	0
23	DF	(Italy) ITA	Materazzi	26	1	16+7	1	2+1	0
31	MF	(Brazil) BRA	César	17	1	13+4	1	0	0
14	MF	(France) FRA	Vieira	19	3	13+3	3	2+1	0
18	FW	(Argentina) ARG	Crespo	24	5	12+7	4	4+1	1
25	DF	(Argentina) ARG	Samuel	17	1	12	0	5	1
11	MF	(Chile) CHI	Jiménez	18	4	11+4	3	0+3	1
7	AM	(Portugal) POR	Figo	20	1	10+7	1	2+1	0
20	FW	(Honduras) HON	Suazo	33	8	9+18	8	2+4	0
45	FW	(Italy) ITA	Balotelli	11	3	7+4	3		
24	DF	(Colombia) COL	Rivas	14	0	6+5	0	3	0
15	MF	(France) FRA	Dacourt	12	0	6+3	0	3	0
30	MF	(Portugal) POR	Pelé	16	0	4+11	0	0+1	0
28	MF	(Portugal) POR	Maniche	8	1	4+4	1		
10	FW	(Brazil) BRA	Adriano	4	1	3+1	1		
21	MF	(Argentina) ARG	Solari	10	0	2+3	0	3+2	0
22	GK	(Italy) ITA	Orlandoni	2	1	1+1	1		
36	FW	(Italy) ITA	Bolzoni	2	0	0	0	1+1	0
37	FW	(Italy) ITA	Puccio	1	0	0	0	0+1	0
	GK	(Italy) ITA	Alfonso	0	0	0	0		
	DF	(Montenegro) MNE	Fatic	0	0	0	0		

- Source: http://calcio-seriea.net/presenze/2007/1314/

=== Squad statistics ===
	League	Europe	Cup	Others	Total Stats
Games played	38	8	7	1	54
Games won	25	5	4	0	34
Games drawn	10	0	2	0	12
Games lost	3	3	1	1	8
Goals scored	69	12	15	0	96
Goals conceded	26	7	7	1	41
Goal difference	43	5	8	-1	55
Clean sheets	18	3	3	0	24
Goal by substitute	–	–	–	–	–
Total shots	–	–	–	–	–
Shots on target	–	–	–	–	–
Corners	–	–	–	–	–
Players used	28	24	32	12	–
Offsides	–	–	–	–	–
Fouls suffered	–	–	–	–	–
Fouls committed	–	–	–	–	–
Yellow cards	65	12	4	3	84
Red cards	5	4	–	–	9

Last updated: 5 August 2008
Source: Soccerway

=== Clean sheets ===
The list is sorted by shirt number when total appearances are equal.

Rnk	No.	Player	Serie A	Champions League	Coppa Italia	Supercoppa Italiana	Total
1	12	(Brazil) Júlio César	17 (Note: Including a clean sheet kept in the week 1 against Udinese. He was sent-off in 57th minute while the match was 1–0 for Inter. The match eventually ended 1–1.)	3	0	0	20
2	1	(Italy) Francesco Toldo	2	0	2	0	4
3	22	(Italy) Paolo Orlandoni	1 (Note: Paolo Orlandoni kept a clean sheet on the same match as Júlio César. They both appeared in the 0–0 home away versus Palermo on 28 October 2007. So both clean sheets are counted.)	0	0	0	1
4	71	(Italy) Enrico Alfonso	0	0	1	0	1
TOTALS			18	3	3	0	24

Last updated: 24 May 2008
