= 2004 Supercoppa Italiana =

- Event: Supercoppa Italiana
AC Milan	Lazio
Serie A	Coppa Italia
3	0
- Date: 21 August 2004
- Venue: San Siro, Milan, Italy
- Referee: Pierluigi Collina
- Attendance: 33,274

The 2004 Supercoppa Italiana was a match contested by the 2003–04 winners AC Milan and the 2003–04 Coppa Italia winners Lazio.

The match result was a 3–0 victory for AC Milan after a hat-trick by Andriy Shevchenko.

== Match details ==
21 August 2004
20:45 CEST (UTC+02:00)

AC Milan	3–0	Lazio
Shevchenko 36', 46', 76'	Report

San Siro, Milan
Attendance: 33,274
Referee: Pierluigi Collina

AC Milan	Lazio

GK	1	(Brazil) Dida
RB	2	(Brazil) Cafu
CB	13	(Italy) Alessandro Nesta
CB	31	(Netherlands) Jaap Stam
LB	3	(Italy) Paolo Maldini (c)
CM	8	(Italy) Gennaro Gattuso
CM	23	(Italy) Massimo Ambrosini	(substituted off) 77'
CM	10	(Portugal) Rui Costa
AM	22	(Brazil) Kaká
CF	7	(Ukraine) Andriy Shevchenko
CF	15	(Denmark) Jon Dahl Tomasson	(substituted off) 75'
Substitutes:
GK	18	(Italy) Christian Abbiati
DF	4	(Georgia (country)) Kakha Kaladze
DF	5	(Italy) Alessandro Costacurta
MF	24	(France) Vikash Dhorasoo	(substituted in) 77'
MF	27	(Brazil) Serginho		(substituted in) 83'
MF	32	(Italy) Cristian Brocchi
FW	11	(Argentina) Hernán Crespo	(substituted in) 75'	(substituted off) 83'
Manager:
(Italy) Carlo Ancelotti

GK	1	(Italy) Angelo Peruzzi
RB	22	(Italy) Massimo Oddo
CB	23	(Italy) Paolo Negro (c)
CB	24	(Portugal) Fernando Couto	(substituted off) 77'
LB	4	(Spain) Óscar López
RM	8	(Italy) Luciano Zauri
CM	6	(France) Ousmane Dabo
CM	16	(Italy) Giuliano Giannichedda	(substituted off) 79'
CM	20	(Italy) Fabio Liverani
LM	10	(Brazil) César	(substituted off) 56'
CF	11	(Italy) Roberto Muzzi
Substitutes:
GK	33	(Italy) Matteo Sereni
DF	37	(Italy) Marco Angeletti
DF	43	(Italy) Simone Sannibale	(substituted in) 77'
MF	32	(Italy) Christian Manfredini	(substituted in) 79'
FW	9	(Italy) Paolo Di Canio	(substituted in) 56'
FW	19	(North Macedonia) Goran Pandev
FW	44	(Italy) Claudio De Sousa
Manager:
(Italy) Domenico Caso

Match officials

- Assistant referees:
- Fourth official:

Match rules

- 90 minutes
- 30 minutes of extra-time if necessary
- Penalty shoot-out if scores still level
- Seven named substitutes, of which up to three may be used

== See also ==
- 2004–05 AC Milan season
- 2004–05 SS Lazio season
