= Pelé (footballer, born 1987) =

Portuguese footballer

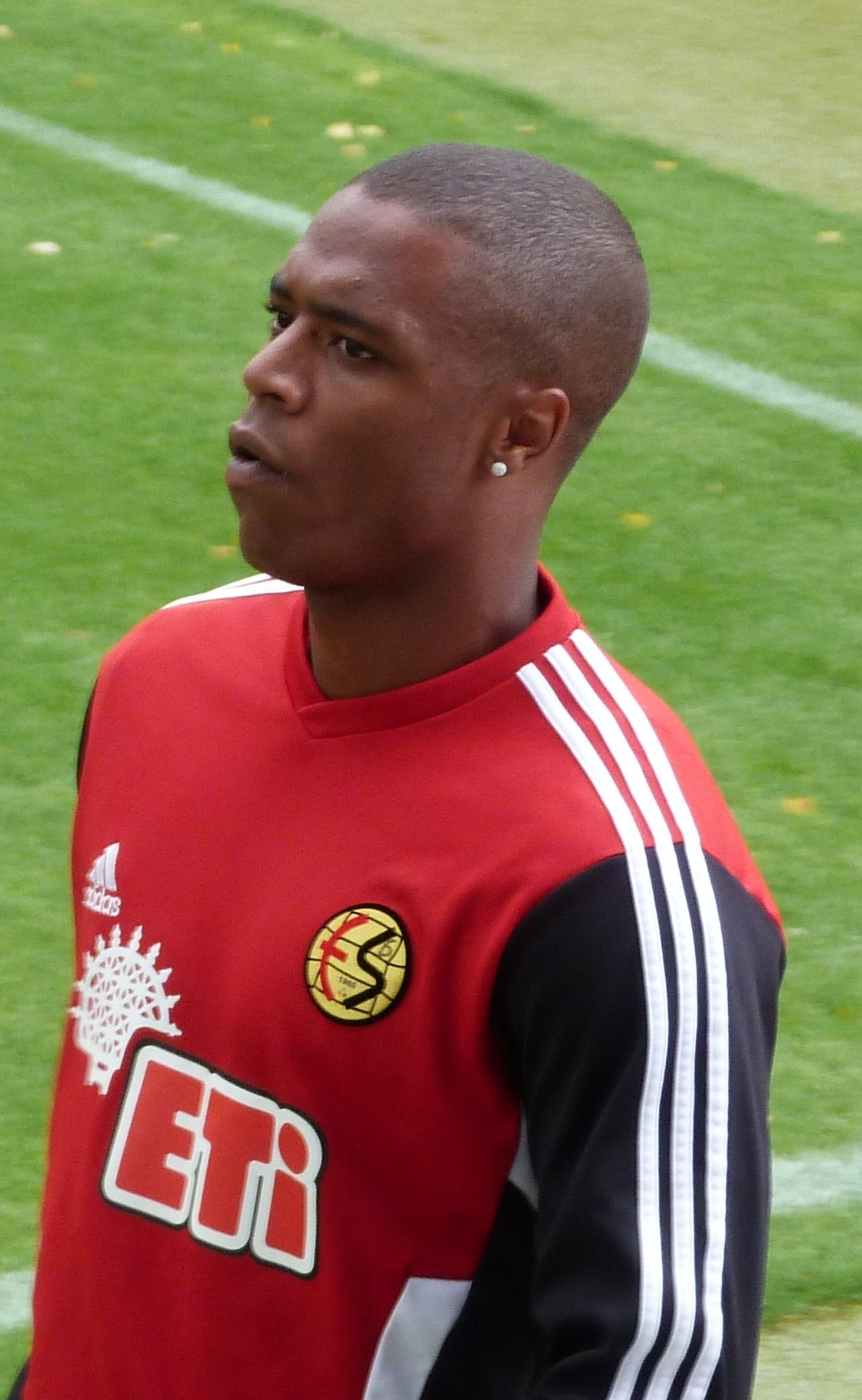

Personal information
- Full name: Vítor Hugo Gomes Passos
- Date of birth: 14 September 1987 (age 39)
- Place of birth: Porto, Portugal
- Height: 1.87 m (6 ft 2 in)
- Position: Midfielder

Youth career
- 1992–2002: Boavista
- 2002–2004: Salgueiros
- 2005: Benfica
- 2006: Vitória Guimarães

Senior career*
Years	Team	Apps	(Gls)
2004–2005	Salgueiros	38	(3)
2006–2007	Vitória Guimarães	9	(0)
2007–2008	Inter Milan	15	(0)
2008–2010	Porto	2	(0)
2009	→ Portsmouth (loan)	0	(0)
2009–2010	→ Valladolid (loan)	23	(0)
2010–2013	Eskişehirspor	41	(3)
2013	Ergotelis	12	(3)
2014–2015	Olympiacos	5	(0)
2015	→ Levadiakos (loan)	10	(1)
2015–2017	Anorthosis	36	(7)
2018	Eskilstuna	0	(0)
2019	Dunărea Călărași	0	(0)
Total		185	(14)

International career
2007	Portugal U20	12	(0)
2007–2009	Portugal U21	12	(2)
- * Club domestic league appearances and goals

Vítor Hugo Gomes Passos (born 14 September 1987), known as Pelé, is a Portuguese former professional footballer who played as a central midfielder.

== Club career ==
=== Early years ===
Pelé started playing at the youth teams of Boavista FC, then switched to S.C. Salgueiros also in his hometown of Porto. The financial crisis of the latter eventually led to the administrative descent to the Segunda Liga; subsequently, the prohibition of signing professional players led to almost every player in the squad leaving.

In the 2004–05 season, Salgueiros' senior squad was constituted primarily of 16 and 17-year-old youth players, including Pelé. Despite winning only one game and drawing other two games during the entire campaign, his performances caught attention.

Along with teammate Joel, Pelé signed for S.L. Benfica in a controversial free transfer, as the players were to move to Boavista which was willing to financially help Salgueiros. Instead, Benfica signed the players and the Paranhos club did not receive any compensation.

=== Vitória Guimarães ===
Pelé joined Benfica B for 2005–06, but did not manage to play regularly, leaving in December 2005 to sign for Vitória S.C. in Guimarães. At start of the following campaign, with the club playing in the second division for the first time in decades, he was a regular on the first team, but a poor start and a managerial change led him to the bench more often, as he finished the season with 11 league appearances and the team achieved promotion to the Primeira Liga.

=== Inter Milan ===
In August 2007, Pelé was signed by Inter Milan for €1.5 million, penning a five-year contract. He made his official debut against UC Sampdoria on 26 September in the Serie A, and made his first start against S.S. Lazio on 5 December, due to midfielders Olivier Dacourt, Luís Figo, Dejan Stanković and Patrick Vieira all being unavailable because of injuries.

Pelé scored his first goal for Inter on 7 May 2008, in a 2–0 away win over Lazio in the semi-finals of the Coppa Italia (also aggregate). He also found the net in the decisive match – from a brilliant long-range volley – but in a 2–1 defeat to AS Roma.

=== Porto ===
On the last day of the 2008 summer transfer window, Pelé was transferred to FC Porto in an exchange involving Ricardo Quaresma and €18.6 million in cash – Pelé himself was tagged at €6 million. On 26 January 2009, however, after playing almost no part in Jesualdo Ferreira's plans during the season, he was transferred to Portsmouth in the Premier League on a six-month loan deal with option to buy at the end.

On 10 June 2009, after no games for Pompey, Pelé returned to Italy, having a medical check at Genoa C.F.C. to finalise the transfer, but the deal fell through. On 20 July he was loaned out to Spain's Real Valladolid on a season-long loan, with a buyout clause to make the move permanent; he eventually finished as a starter due to injury to incumbent Álvaro Rubio, but the Castile and León side were relegated from La Liga after a three-year stay.

=== Later career ===
In July 2010, Pelé moved to Eskisehirspor in the Turkish Süper Lig, on a three-year contract. He moved teams and countries again after it expired, joining Ergotelis F.C. from Greece for two years.

On 30 December 2013, Pelé agreed to a three-and-a-half-year deal with fellow Super League Greece side Olympiacos FC. Late into the January 2015 transfer window, after only nine competitive games, he was loaned to Levadiakos F.C. also in the country's top flight.

Pelé was released by Olympiacos on 31 August 2015, and signed a two-year contract with Anorthosis Famagusta F.C. for an undisclosed fee. On 23 July 2018, after one year of inactivity, the 30-year-old joined AFC Eskilstuna in the Swedish Superettan, leaving at the end of the year with no appearances to his credit and meeting the same fate at his next club, Romania's FC Dunărea Călărași, due to a heart condition that was detected in his medical.

== International career ==
Pelé was called to the Portugal under-20 team on several occasions, playing in the 2007 Toulon Tournament and that year's FIFA World Cup. Shortly after, he began appearing for the under-21s.

== Career statistics ==
Club	Season	League			National cup (Note: Includes Taça de Portugal, Taça da Liga, Coppa Italia, Copa del Rey, Turkish Cup, Greek Football Cup, Cypriot Cup and Svenska Cupen)		Continental		Total	
Club	Season	Division	Apps	Goals	Apps	Goals	Apps	Goals	Apps	Goals
Salgueiros	2004–05	Segunda Divisão	38	3	1	0	—		39	3
Vitória Guimarães	2006–07	Segunda Liga	9	0	0	0	—		9	0
Inter Milan	2007–08	Serie A	15	0	6	2	1 (Note: Appearances in UEFA Champions League)	0	22	2
Porto	2008–09	Primeira Liga	2	0	3	0	2	0	7	0
Portsmouth (loan)	2008–09	Premier League	0	0	0	0	—		0	0
Valladolid (loan)	2009–10	La Liga	23	0	2	0	—		25	0
Eskişehirspor	2010–11	Süper Lig	25	2	1	0	—		26	2
Eskişehirspor	2011–12	Süper Lig	16	1	3	1	—		19	2
Ergotelis	2013–14	Super League Greece	12	3	2	0	—		14	3
Olympiacos	2013–14	Super League Greece	5	0	2	0	—		7	0
Olympiacos	2014–15	Super League Greece	0	0	2	0	—		2	0
Levadiakos (loan)	2014–15	Super League Greece	10	1	0	0	—		10	1
Anorthosis	2015–16	Cypriot First Division	22	5	1	0	—		23	5
Anorthosis	2016–17	Cypriot First Division	14	2	0	0	—		14	2
Eskilstuna	2017	Superettan	0	0	0	0	—		0	0
Eskilstuna	2018	Superettan	0	0	1	1	—		1	1
Career total			191	17	24	4	3	0	218	21

== Honours ==
Inter Milan

- Serie A: 2007–08
- Supercoppa Italiana: 2008

Porto

- Primeira Liga: 2008–09
- Taça de Portugal: 2008–09

Olympiacos

- Super League Greece: 2013–14
