= Marco Filippini =

Italian footballer

Personal information
- Full name: Marco Filippini
- Date of birth: 19 September 1988 (age 38)
- Place of birth: Montichiari, Italy
- Height: 1.80 m (5 ft 11 in)
- Position: Defender

Youth career
- Montichiari

Senior career*
Years	Team	Apps	(Gls)
2004–2007	Montichiari	22	(0)
2007–2008	Internazionale	0	(0)
2008–2012	Montichiari	84	(0)
- * Club domestic league appearances and goals

Marco Filippini (born 19 September 1988) is an Italian footballer.

== Career ==
Filippini started his career at Montichiari of Serie C2. He was signed by Internazionale in July 2007. He made his debut on 17 January 2008, a Coppa Italia match that won Reggina 3–0. In that match, he replaced Nicolás Burdisso in the 83rd minute. In 2008, he returned to Montichiari and followed the team relegated to Serie D in 2009. He won promotion back to the professional league in 2010. That season, he played 20 times in Serie D.
