= Leonardo Talamonti =

Argentine footballer

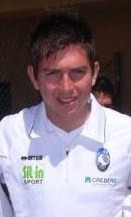

Personal information
- Full name: Leonardo José Talamonti
- Date of birth: 12 November 1981 (age 44)
- Place of birth: Álvarez, Argentina
- Height: 1.83 m (6 ft 0 in)
- Position: Defender

Youth career
- Rosario Central

Senior career*
Years	Team	Apps	(Gls)
2000–2005	Rosario Central	93	(8)
2004–2005	→ Lazio (loan)	12	(1)
2005–2006	River Plate	24	(0)
2006–2011	Atalanta	84	(1)
2011–2013	Rosario Central	16	(0)
2013–2015	Sportivo Belgrano	15	(0)
2015	CA Atlanta	14	(1)
2016–	Platense		
- * Club domestic league appearances and goals as of 25 May 2015

Leonardo José Talamonti (born 12 November 1981 in Álvarez, Santa Fe) is an Argentine football former defender who last played for Platense.

== Career ==
Talamonti began his career with Rosario Central in the city of Rosario in Argentina and after making almost 100 appearances for the club he was loaned to Italian Serie A side Lazio. But after only one year in Italy he returned to Argentina to play for River Plate. In the summer of 2006 he began playing with Atalanta.

On 4 July 2011, he mutually terminated his contract with Atalanta. Later, in the same month, Talamonti returns to Argentina, signing with Rosario Central. After stints in Sportivo Belgrano and Atlanta, he transferred to Platense in 2016.
