= Esteban González (footballer, born 1978) =

Argentine footballer and coach

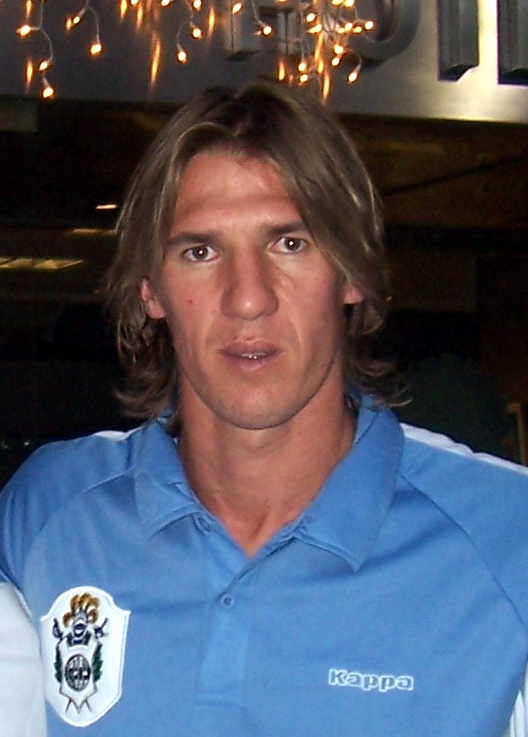
- Photo of the Argentine soccer player Esteban Nicolás González in 2009.

Personal information
- Full name: Esteban Nicolás González
- Date of birth: 16 September 1978 (age 48)
- Place of birth: Córdoba, Argentina
- Height: 1.86 m (6 ft 1 in)
- Position: Defensive midfielder

Senior career*
Years	Team	Apps	(Gls)
1998–2001	Belgrano	76	(3)
2001–2004	Gimnasia LP	91	(5)
2004–2005	Lazio	3	(0)
2005–2006	Gimnasia LP	47	(5)
2007	Colón	29	(1)
2008	Las Palmas	15	(0)
2008–2010	Gimnasia LP	47	(3)
2010–2011	Tigre	29	(3)
2011–2015	Belgrano	109	(4)

Managerial career
- 2015–2016: Belgrano II
- 2016: Belgrano
- 2021: Belgrano
- 2023–2024: Gimnasia y Esgrima (LP) (assistant)
- * Club domestic league appearances and goals

Esteban Nicolás González (born 16 September 1978) is an Argentine football coach and a former player.
