= Marco Angeletti =

Italian footballer (born 1986)

Personal information
- Date of birth: 19 February 1986 (age 40)
- Place of birth: Rome, Italy
- Height: 1.80 m (5 ft 11 in)
- Position: Defender

Senior career*
Years	Team	Apps	(Gls)
2005	Lazio	0	(0)
2005–2006	Sambenedettese	8	(0)
2006–2007	Lanciano	25	(0)
2007–2011	Cisco Roma	87	(3)
2011–2013	Barletta	18	(0)
2013–2014	Anziolavinio	28	(3)
2014	Fiorita		
2014–2016	Ostia Mare	22	(2)
2016–2017	Albalonga	16	(1)
2017–2018	Ottavia		
- * Club domestic league appearances and goals

Marco Angeletti (born 19 February 1986) is an Italian former footballer who played as a defender.
