= Simone Sannibale =

Italian footballer

Personal information
- Date of birth: 10 March 1986 (age 40)
- Place of birth: Albano Laziale, Italy
- Height: 1.86 m (6 ft 1 in)
- Position: Centre back

Team information
- Current team: Nocerina

Youth career
- Lazio

Senior career*
Years	Team	Apps	(Gls)
2005–	Lazio	0	(0)
2005–2006	→ Salernitana (loan)	14	(0)
2006–2007	→ Juve Stabia (loan)	4	(0)
2007	→ Sassari Torres (loan)	14	(0)
2007–2008	→ Scafatese (loan)	9	(0)
2008–2009	→ Isola Liri (loan)	32	(2)
2009–	→ Nocerina (loan)	8	(0)

International career^{‡}
2005	Italy U-19	1	(0)
- * Club domestic league appearances and goals as of 14:55, 11 May 2010 (UTC) ‡ National team caps and goals as of April 19, 2005

Simone Sannibale (born 10 March 1986 in Albano Laziale) is an Italian footballer who plays as a defender for A.S.G. Nocerina on loan from S.S. Lazio.

He made his debut for the biancocelesti in the 2004 Italian Super Cup, played against A.C. Milan and ended in a 0–3 loss for Lazio, replacing Fernando Couto. In the following years, he was then sent out on loan to a number of Serie C1 and Serie C2 teams, most recently Scafatese in January 2008.
