= César (footballer, born 1974) =

Brazilian footballer

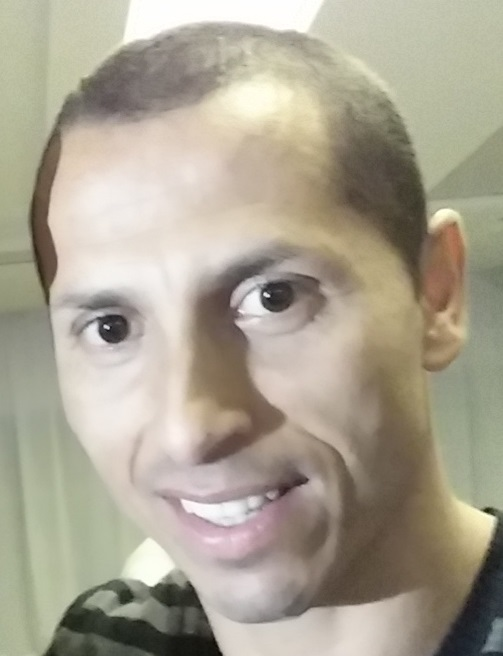
- César in 2016

Personal information
- Full name: César Aparecido Rodrigues
- Date of birth: 24 October 1974 (age 52)
- Place of birth: São Paulo, Brazil
- Height: 1.81 m (5 ft 11 1/2 in)
- Positions: Left midfielder; left-back

Team information
- Current team: Lazio (youth coach)

Youth career
- 1992–1994: CA Juventus

Senior career*
| Years | Team | Apps | (Gls) |
| 1994–1998 | CA Juventus | | |
| 1998 | União Barbarense | | |
| 1998–2001 | São Caetano | 31 | (8) |
| 2001–2006 | Lazio | 86 | (13) |
| 2006 | → Internazionale (loan) | 8 | (1) |
| 2006–2008 | Internazionale | 17 | (1) |
| 2006–2007 | → Corinthians (loan) | 13 | (1) |
| 2007 | → Livorno (loan) | 9 | (1) |
| 2008–2009 | Bologna | 6 | (0) |
| 2009–2010 | Valle del Giovenco | 16 | (3) |

International career
| 2001 | Brazil | 2 | (0) |
- * Club domestic league appearances and goals

César Aparecido Rodrigues (born 24 October 1974), better known just as César, is a Brazilian retired footballer who played as a left midfielder (his preferred position) or left-back. He is currently under contract as the youth coach of Lazio.

César won 2 Serie A titles with Inter and 2 Coppa Italia titles, one with Inter and the other with Lazio; he represented Brazil on 2 occasions, both in 2001.

== Playing career ==
Born in São Paulo, César started his career at CA Juventus, a small São Paulo team at the time. In 1994 his team was promoted to the top division of the state and the team was awarded an amount of money for the success; however this money was stolen, and César was discovered to be involved, giving information about the delivery, and sentenced to 5 years and 4 months of jail. In 1998, he was released, and returned to football, thanks to the intervention of São Caetano, a team which had signed him one year before being arrested, and loaned to União Barbarense, a satellite club. When back to São Caetano, César immediately became a key player, even becoming the team captain. He then led his team from minor leagues up to the National Brazilian championship finals in 2000.

After being tracked by Lazio for some time, in the summer of 2001 César joined the Italian Serie A team, becoming an important player for the Roman club. In January 2006, after a long courtship, Inter Milan loaned César, giving him the opportunity to play in one of the leading teams of Italy. At the summer of 2006, the contract with Lazio ended. Cesar joined Inter, signed a long-term contract. But César was transferred to major Brazilian Série A team Corinthians on loan. However, in December 2006, the end of Brazilian season, César declared his willingness to return to play in Italy; he signed by Livorno on loan on 25 January 2007, to replace the left of César Prates.

On 11 February 2007, he played his first Serie A match for Livorno against Inter He started the 2007–08 season in good form with Internazionale linking up well with Maxwell down the left flank even managing to get a goal. However, since then, he has been dropped from the squad again, and only featured against Torino, for 45 minutes, during which he disappointed many Inter fans, and was taken off at half time for Luis Jiménez, due to the large number of injuries the Inter squad had suffered.

The summer of 2008 saw César clubless, after his contract with Inter expired. Cesar did not sign for a club in the 2008 summer transfer season, leaving him clubless for the first half of the 2008–09 season. On 18 November 2008, César signed for Bologna, coached by his former Inter assistant coach, Siniša Mihajlović. On 9 October 2009 he joined Italian third division club Valle del Giovenco.

== Coaching career ==
In August 2011, César put an end to his playing career and accepted a coaching role at SS Lazio, being appointed in charge of the Giovanissimi Provinciali B youth team.
