= 2011–12 US Lecce season =

U.S. Lecce
2011–12 season
- Chairman: Isabella Liguori
- Manager: Eusebio Di Francesco; Serse Cosmi
- Serie A: 18th (relegated in B)
- Coppa Italia: Third round
- Top goalscorer: League: David Di Michele (7); All: David Di Michele (7)
- Highest home attendance: 13,300 vs Milan (23 October 2011)
- Lowest home attendance: 2,892 vs Cagliari (2 October 2011)
- Average home league attendance: 9,058 (Serie A)
Home colours	Away colours	Third colours

Lecce suffered a very bad season start, with an elimination in Coppa Italia and 9 losses in 13 league matches. On 3 December, the manager Eusebio Di Francesco was sacked: Serse Cosmi was appointed new coach. After his arrival, the side began to struggle in the attempt to avoid relegation and although gaining a notable number of points in the following months, did not manage to escape, mainly due to four losses in the last five matches, being relegated to Serie B.

== Squad ==
As of 24 September 2011

Note: Flags indicate national team as defined under FIFA eligibility rules; some limited exceptions apply. Players may hold more than one non-FIFA nationality.

No.	Pos.	Nation	Player
1	GK	ITA	Ugo Gabrieli
3	DF	ITA	Luca Di Matteo (on loan from Palermo)
5	DF	ITA	Andrea Esposito (on loan from Genoa)
6	MF	ITA	Manuel Giandonato (on loan from Juventus)
7	FW	COL	Juan Cuadrado (on loan from Udinese)
8	MF	NGR	Christian Obodo (on loan from Udinese)
9	FW	ITA	Daniele Corvia
10	FW	BUL	Valeri Bojinov (on loan from Sporting CP)
11	FW	SUI	Haris Seferovic (on loan from Fiorentina)
12	MF	BRA	Barinho (on loan from Bari)
13	MF	URU	Leonardo Migliónico
15	FW	NGR	Edward Ofere
16	DF	MLI	Souleymane Diamoutene
17	FW	ITA	David Di Michele
18	MF	URU	Guillermo Giacomazzi (captain)
21	MF	URU	Carlos Grossmüller

No.	Pos.	Nation	Player
22	MF	ARG	Ignacio Piatti
23	FW	ITA	Luigi Falcone
24	FW	COL	Luis Muriel (on loan from Udinese)
25	GK	ITA	Davide Petrachi
26	MF	ITA	Manuele Blasi
27	GK	BRA	Júlio Sérgio (on loan from Roma)
28	DF	ITA	Davide Brivio
30	DF	ITA	Massimo Oddo (on loan from Milan)
40	DF	SRB	Nenad Tomović (on loan from Genoa)
41	DF	ITA	Gianmarco Ingrosso
50	GK	ITA	Luigi Turbacci
80	DF	ITA	Moris Carrozzieri
81	GK	ITA	Massimiliano Benassi
82	MF	ITA	Gennaro Delvecchio
91	MF	ITA	Andrea Bertolacci (on loan from Roma)

=== Out on loan ===
Note: Flags indicate national team as defined under FIFA eligibility rules; some limited exceptions apply. Players may hold more than one non-FIFA nationality.

No.	Pos.	Nation	Player
13	DF	ITA	Stefano Ferrario (at Parma)
20	FW	FRA	Bryan Bergougnoux (at Omonia)
—	FW	ITA	Cosimo Chiricò (at Virtus Lanciano)

No.	Pos.	Nation	Player
—	DF	ITA	Antonio Mazzotta (at Crotone)
—	FW	ITA	Daniele Cacia (at Padova)
—	FW	BRA	Jeda (at Novara)

== Transfers ==
=== Summer ===
In: Note: Flags indicate national team as defined under FIFA eligibility rules; some limited exceptions apply. Players may hold more than one non-FIFA nationality.

No.	Pos.	Nation	Player
3	DF	ITA	Luca Di Matteo (loan from Palermo)
6	MF	ITA	Manuel Giandonato (loan from Juventus)
7	MF	COL	Juan Cuadrado (loan from Udinese)
8	MF	NGR	Christian Obodo (loan from Udinese)
10	FW	BUL	Valeri Bojinov (loan from (Portugal) Sporting CP)
14	MF	SLE	Rodney Strasser (loan from Milan)
24	FW	COL	Luis Muriel (loan from Udinese)
27	GK	BRA	Júlio Sérgio (loan from Roma)
28	DF	ITA	Davide Brivio (Co-ownership from Vicenza)
30	DF	ITA	Massimo Oddo (loan from Milan)
40	DF	SRB	Nenad Tomović (loan from Genoa)
77	FW	ITA	Cristian Pasquato (loan from Juventus)
80	DF	ITA	Moris Carrozzieri (from Palermo)
82	MF	ITA	Gennaro Delvecchio (from Catania)
91	MF	ITA	Andrea Bertolacci (loan from Roma)
—	FW	ITA	Daniele Cacia (Co-ownership from Piacenza)
—	DF	ITA	Antonio Mazzotta (Co-ownership from Palermo)

Out: Note: Flags indicate national team as defined under FIFA eligibility rules; some limited exceptions apply. Players may hold more than one non-FIFA nationality.

No.	Pos.	Nation	Player
—	GK	ITA	Antonio Rosati (to Napoli)
—	MF	ITA	Giuseppe Vives (to Torino)
—	FW	ITA	Giuseppe Caccavallo (to Crotone)

=== Winter ===
In: Note: Flags indicate national team as defined under FIFA eligibility rules; some limited exceptions apply. Players may hold more than one non-FIFA nationality.

No.	Pos.	Nation	Player
5	DF	ITA	Andrea Esposito (loan from Genoa)
11	FW	SUI	Haris Seferovic (loan from Fiorentina)
13	MF	URU	Leonardo Migliónico (from Fiorentina)
26	MF	ITA	Manuele Blasi (from Parma)

Out: Note: Flags indicate national team as defined under FIFA eligibility rules; some limited exceptions apply. Players may hold more than one non-FIFA nationality.

No.	Pos.	Nation	Player
10	MF	URU	Rubén Olivera (to Fiorentina)
11	FW	ALG	Djamel Mesbah (to Milan)
13	DF	ITA	Stefano Ferrario (loan to Parma)
14	MF	SLE	Rodney Strasser (loan return to Milan)
77	FW	ITA	Cristian Pasquato (loan return to Juventus)

== Competitions ==
Competition	Started round	Current position / round	Final position / round	First match	Last match
Serie A	—	—	18th	11 September 2011	13 May 2012
Coppa Italia	Round 3	—	Round 3	21 August 2011	21 August 2011

Updated to match played 13 May 2012
Source: Competitions

=== Serie A ===
==== Results summary ====
Overall								Home						Away					
Pld	W	D	L	GF	GA	GD	Pts	W	D	L	GF	GA	GD	W	D	L	GF	GA	GD
38	8	12	18	40	56	−16	36	3	6	10	22	29	−7	5	6	8	18	27	−9

Last updated: 13 May 2012.
Source: Soccerway

==== Results by round ====
Round	1	2	3	4	5	6	7	8	9	10	11	12	13	14	15	16	17	18	19	20	21	22	23	24	25	26	27	28	29	30	31	32	33	34	35	36	37	38
Ground	H	A	H	A	H	A	H	A	H	A	A	H	A	H	A	A	H	A	H	H	A	H	A	H	A	H	A	H	A	H	H	A	A	H	H	A	H	A
Result	L	W	L	L	L	D	L	L	D	W	L	L	L	L	D	L	L	W	D	W	L	D	D	W	W	D	L	D	D	D	W	W	D	L	L	D	L	L
Position	18	8	12	17	18	19	19	19	19	18	18	20	20	20	20	20	20	19	19	18	18	18	18	18	18	18	18	18	18	18	18	18	18	18	18	18	18	18

Source: Soccerway
A = Away; H = Home; W = Win; D = Draw; L = Loss

==== Fixtures & results ====
11 September 2011 1	Lecce	0 – 2	Udinese	Stadio Via del Mare
		Summary	Basta 2'; Di Natale 16'	Attendance: 10,000

18 September 2011 2	Bologna	0 – 2	Lecce	Stadio Renato Dall'Ara
		Summary	Giacomazzi 37'; Grossmüller 60'	Attendance: 15,745

21 September 2011 3	Lecce	1 – 2	Atalanta	Stadio Via del Mare
	Mesbah 26'; Grossmüller (yellow card) 63' (yellow-red card) 64'	Summary	Denis 3' (pen.), 56'	Attendance: 8,100

25 September 2011 4	Siena	3 – 0	Lecce	Stadio Artemio Franchi
	Destro 6'; Calaiò 53', 70'	Summary	Esposito (yellow card) 45' (yellow-red card) 62'	Attendance: 15,373

2 October 2011 5	Lecce	0 – 2	Cagliari	Stadio Via del Mare
		Summary	Ribeiro 10'; Biondini 40'	Attendance: 2,892

16 October 2011 6	Genoa	0 – 0	Lecce	Stadio Luigi Ferraris
	Kaladze (yellow card) 79' (yellow-red card) 80'	Summary		Attendance: 20,101

23 October 2011 7	Lecce	3 – 4	Milan	Stadio Via del Mare
	Giacomazzi 4'; Oddo 30' (pen.); Grossmüller 37'	Summary	Boateng 49', 54', 63'; Yepes 83'	Attendance: 13,300

27 October 2011 8	Palermo	2 – 0	Lecce	Stadio Renzo Barbera
	Pinilla 28' (pen.); Hernández 77'	Summary		Attendance: 24,000

30 October 2011 9	Lecce	1 – 1	Novara	Stadio Via del Mare
	Strasser 32'	Summary	Rigoni 44' (pen.)	Attendance: 11,000

6 November 2011 10	Cesena	0 – 1	Lecce	Stadio Dino Manuzzi
		Summary	Cuadrado 56'; Muriel (yellow card) 58' (yellow-red card) 58'	Attendance: 14,000

20 November 2011 11	Roma	2 – 1	Lecce	Stadio Olimpico
	Pjanić 25'; Gago 54'	Summary	Bertolacci 61'	Attendance: 30,768

26 November 2011 12	Lecce	0 – 1	Catania	Stadio Via del Mare
		Summary	Barrientos 90'	Attendance: 6,000

3 December 2011 13	Napoli	4 – 2	Lecce	Stadio San Paolo
	Lavezzi 26'; Cavani 33', 82'; Džemaili 42'	Summary	Muriel 54'; Corvia 90+4'	Attendance: 49,000

10 December 2011 14	Lecce	2 – 3	Lazio	Stadio Via del Mare
	Di Michele 12' (pen.); Ferrario 59'	Summary	Klose 28', 87'; Cana 47'	Attendance: 10,000

18 December 2011 15	Parma	3 – 3	Lecce	Stadio Ennio Tardini
	Floccari 18' (pen.); Pellè 86'; Galloppa 90+2'	Report	Di Michele 58', 61'; Cuadrado 77'

21 December 2011 16	Inter Milan	4 – 1	Lecce	San Siro
	Pazzini 34'; Milito 49'; Cambiasso 73'; Álvarez 81'	Summary	Muriel 20'

8 January 2012 17	Lecce	0 – 1	Juventus	Stadio Via del Mare
		Summary	Matri 27'

15 January 2012 18	Fiorentina	0 – 1	Lecce	Stadio Artemio Franchi
		Summary	Di Michele 66' (pen.)	Attendance: 18,474

22 January 2012 19	Lecce	2 – 2	Chievo	Stadio Via del Mare
	Esposito 30'; Di Michele 93'	Summary	Paloschi 3', 24'

29 January 2012 20	Lecce	1 – 0	Internazionale	Stadio Via del Mare
	Giacomazzi 40'	Summary

1 February 2012 21	Udinese	2 – 1	Lecce	Stadio Friuli
	Pazienza 2'; Di Natale 37'	Summary	Di Michele 26'	Attendance: 18,000

5 February 2012 22	Lecce	0 – 0	Bologna	Stadio Via del Mare
	Carrozzieri (yellow card) 68' (yellow-red card) 74'	[ Summary]		Attendance: 6,000

12 February 2012 23	Atalanta	0 – 0	Lecce	Stadio Atleti Azzurri d'Italia
14:00	Raimondi (yellow card) 75'	Summary	Giacomazzi (yellow card) 81'; Miglionico (yellow card) 83'	Attendance: 12,000

19 February 2012 24	Lecce	4 – 1	Siena	Stadio Via del Mare
11:30	Muriel 32'; Di Michele 68' (pen.); Caudrado 82'; Blasi (red card) 90+1'; Brivio 90+4'	Summary	Del Grosso 25'	Attendance: 8,000

26 February 2012 25	Cagliari	1 – 2	Lecce	Stadio Sant'Elia
14:00	Larrivey 50' (pen.); Canini (yellow card) 7' (yellow-red card) 84'	Summary	Muriel 45'; Bertolacci 62'

4 March 2012 26	Lecce	2 – 2	Genoa	Stadio Via del Mare
	Muriel 61'; Brivio 81'	Summary	Sculli 21', 86'

11 March 2012 27	Milan	2 – 0	Lecce	San Siro
	Nocerino 7'; Ibrahimović 65'	Summary		Attendance: 54,329

18 March 2012 28	Lecce	1 – 1	Palermo	Stadio Via del Mare
	Di Michele 6' (pen.); Oddo (red card) 17'	Summary	Muñoz 15'; Bertolo (red card) 42'	Attendance: 8,400

25 March 2012 29	Novara	0 – 0	Lecce	Stadio Silvio Piola
		Summary

1 April 2012 30	Lecce	0 – 0	Cesena	Stadio Via del Mare
		Summary		Attendance: 6,950

7 April 2012 31	Lecce	4 – 2	Roma	Stadio Via del Mare
	Muriel 22', 49'; Di Michele 44', 56' (pen.)	Summary	Bojan 88'; Lamela 90'	Attendance: 12,600

11 April 2012 32	Catania	1 – 2	Lecce	Stadio Angelo Massimino
	Bergessio 52'; Carrizo (yellow card) 89' (yellow-red card) 89'	Summary	Corvia 88'; Di Michele 90+1'	Attendance: 15,000

15 April 2012 33	Lecce	– ^{1}	Napoli	Stadio Via del Mare
		Summary

22 April 2012 34	Lazio	1 – 1	Lecce	Stadio Olimpico
	Matuzalém 82'	Summary	Bojinov 90+1'	Attendance: 32,000

25 April 2012 33^{1}	Lecce	0 – 2	Napoli	Stadio Via del Mare
		Summary	Hamšík 4'; Cavani 51'	Attendance: 10,000

29 April 2012 35	Lecce	1 – 2	Parma	Stadio Via del Mare
	Tomović 83'; Esposito (yellow card) 72' (yellow-red card) 90+1'	Summary	Giovinco 67'; Paletta 78'	Attendance: 10,300

2 May 2012 36	Juventus	1 – 1	Lecce	Juventus Stadium
	Marchisio 9'	Summary	Cuadrado (yellow card) 20' (yellow-red card) 54'; Muriel 85'	Attendance: 32,000

5 May 2012 37	Lecce	0 – 1	Fiorentina	Stadio Via del Mare
		Summary	Cerci 35'	Attendance: 12,700

13 May 2012 38	Chievo	1 – 0	Lecce	Stadio Marc'Antonio Bentegodi
	Vacek 78'	Summary	Carrozzieri (red card) 82'	Attendance: 11,000

Notes

- The Serie A game against Napoli was postponed due to the death of Livorno's Piermario Morosini

==== League table ====
Pos	Team	Pld	W	D	L	GF	GA	GD	Pts	Qualification or relegation
16	Palermo	38	11	10	17	52	62	−10	43 (Note: Cagliari finished ahead of Palermo on goal difference : Cagliari 2–1 Palermo, Palermo 3–2 Cagliari; Cagliari = –9, Palermo = –10.)	
17	Genoa	38	11	9	18	50	69	−19	42	
18	Lecce (R, D, R)	38	8	12	18	40	56	−16	36	Relegation to Serie C1 (Note: Lecce were originally relegated to Serie B, but further relegated to Lega Pro Prima Divisione due to involvement in the 2011–12 Italian football scandal.)
19	Novara (R)	38	7	11	20	35	65	−30	32	Relegation to Serie B
20	Cesena (R)	38	4	10	24	24	60	−36	22	Relegation to Serie B

Source: Lega Serie A
Rules for classification: 1) points; 2) head-to-head points; 3) head-to-head goal difference; 4) head-to-head goals scored; 5) goal difference; 6) number of goals scored
(D) Disqualified; (R) Relegated

=== Coppa Italia ===
21 August 2011 Section 1 - Round 3	Lecce	0–2	Crotone	Lecce
20:45 CEST		Summary	45' Đurić; 50' Ciano	Stadium: Stadio Via del Mare; Attendance: 8,168; Referee: Domenico Celi

== Squad statistics ==
=== Appearances and goals ===
As of 14 May 2012

No.	Pos	Nat	Player	Total		Serie A		Coppa Italia	
No.	Pos	Nat	Player	Apps	Goals	Apps	Goals	Apps	Goals
1	GK	(Italy) ITA	Ugo Gabrieli	2	0	1+1	0	0+0	0
3	DF	(Italy) ITA	Luca Di Matteo	7	0	2+5	0	0+0	0
5	DF	(Italy) ITA	Andrea Esposito	26	1	25+1	1	0+0	0
6	MF	(Italy) ITA	Manuel Giandonato	7	0	2+5	0	0+0	0
7	MF	(Colombia) COL	Juan Cuadrado	33	2	32+1	2	0+0	0
8	MF	(Nigeria) NGR	Christian Obodo	23	0	15+7	0	1+0	0
9	FW	(Italy) ITA	Daniele Corvia	24	2	7+16	2	1+0	0
10	FW	(Bulgaria) BUL	Valeri Bojinov	10	1	3+7	1	0+0	0
11	FW	(Switzerland) SUI	Haris Seferovic	5	0	2+3	0	0+0	0
13	DF	(Uruguay) URU	Leonardo Migliónico	15	0	13+2	0	0+0	0
15	FW	(Nigeria) NGR	Edward Ofere	9	0	1+7	0	0+1	0
17	FW	(Italy) ITA	David Di Michele	30	11	28+1	11	1+0	0
18	MF	(Uruguay) URU	Guillermo Giacomazzi	33	3	30+2	3	1+0	0
21	MF	(Uruguay) URU	Carlos Grossmüller	14	2	11+3	2	0+0	0
22	MF	(Argentina) ARG	Ignacio Piatti	13	0	5+7	0	1+0	0
23	FW	(Italy) ITA	Luigi Falcone	2	0	0+0	0	1+1	0
24	FW	(Colombia) COL	Luis Muriel	29	8	25+4	8	0+0	0
25	GK	(Italy) ITA	Davide Petrachi	1	0	0+1	0	0+0	0
26	MF	(Italy) ITA	Manuele Blasi	16	0	14+2	0	0+0	0
27	GK	(Brazil) BRA	Júlio Sérgio	11	0	8+2	0	1+0	0
28	DF	(Italy) ITA	Davide Brivio	27	2	23+3	2	0+1	0
30	DF	(Italy) ITA	Massimo Oddo	27	1	26+1	1	0+0	0
40	DF	(Serbia) SRB	Nenad Tomović	34	1	31+2	1	1+0	0
80	DF	(Italy) ITA	Moris Carrozzieri	13	0	12+0	0	1+0	0
81	GK	(Italy) ITA	Massimiliano Benassi	29	0	29+0	0	0+0	0
82	MF	(Italy) ITA	Gennaro Delvecchio	16	0	15+1	0	0+0	0
91	MF	(Italy) ITA	Andrea Bertolacci	29	2	13+16	2	0+0	0
Players who appeared for Lecce no longer at the club:
10	MF	(Uruguay) URU	Rubén Olivera	13	0	10+2	0	1+0	0
11	MF	(Algeria) ALG	Djamel Mesbah	13	1	12+0	1	1+0	0
13	DF	(Italy) ITA	Stefano Ferrario	9	1	8+0	1	1+0	0
14	MF	(Sierra Leone) SLE	Rodney Strasser	13	1	9+3	1	1+0	0
77	FW	(Italy) ITA	Cristian Pasquato	11	0	5+6	0	0+0	0

=== Top scorers ===
Place	Position	Nation	Number	Name	Serie A	Coppa Italia	Total
1	FW	(Italy)	17	David Di Michele	11	0	11
2	MF	(Colombia)	24	Luis Muriel	8	0	8
3	MF	(Uruguay)	18	Guillermo Giacomazzi	3	0	3
3	MF	(Colombia)	7	Juan Cuadrado	3	0	3
5	MF	(Uruguay)	21	Carlos Grossmüller	2	0	2
5	MF	(Italy)	91	Andrea Bertolacci	2	0	2
5	DF	(Italy)	5	Davide Brivio	2	0	2
5	MF	(Italy)	9	Daniele Corvia	2	0	2
9	MF	(Algeria)	11	Djamel Mesbah	1	0	1
9	DF	(Italy)	30	Massimo Oddo	1	0	1
9	MF	(Sierra Leone)	14	Rodney Strasser	1	0	1
9	DF	(Italy)	13	Stefano Ferrario	1	0	1
9	DF	(Italy)	5	Andrea Esposito	1	0	1
9	FW	(Bulgaria)	10	Valeri Bojinov	1	0	1
9	FW	(Serbia)	40	Nenad Tomović	1	0	1
				TOTALS	40	0	40

=== Disciplinary record ===
Number	Nation	Position	Name	Serie A		Coppa Italia		Total	
Number	Nation	Position	Name	Yellow card	Red card	Yellow card	Red card	Yellow card	Red card
3	(Italy)	DF	Luca Di Matteo	1	0	0	0	1	0
5	(Italy)	DF	Andrea Esposito	10	2	0	0	10	2
6	(Italy)	MF	Manuel Giandonato	1	0	0	0	1	0
7	(Colombia)	MF	Juan Cuadrado	10	1	0	0	10	1
8	(Nigeria)	MF	Christian Obodo	4	0	0	0	4	0
9	(Italy)	FW	Daniele Corvia	3	0	0	0	3	0
10	(Uruguay)	MF	Rubén Olivera	4	0	0	0	4	0
11	(Algeria)	MF	Djamel Mesbah	3	0	0	0	3	0
11	(Switzerland)	FW	Haris Seferovic	1	0	0	0	1	0
13	(Italy)	DF	Stefano Ferrario	8	0	0	0	8	0
14	(Sierra Leone)	MF	Rodney Strasser	4	0	0	0	4	0
17	(Italy)	FW	David Di Michele	7	0	1	0	8	0
18	(Uruguay)	MF	Guillermo Giacomazzi	7	0	0	0	7	0
21	(Uruguay)	MF	Carlos Grossmüller	2	1	0	0	2	1
22	(Argentina)	MF	Ignacio Piatti	1	0	0	0	1	0
24	(Colombia)	FW	Luis Muriel	6	1	0	0	6	1
26	(Italy)	MF	Manuele Blasi	4	1	0	0	4	1
28	(Italy)	DF	Davide Brivio	3	0	0	0	3	0
30	(Italy)	DF	Massimo Oddo	6	1	0	0	6	1
40	(Serbia)	DF	Nenad Tomović	6	0	0	0	6	0
77	(Italy)	FW	Cristian Pasquato	1	0	0	0	1	0
80	(Italy)	DF	Moris Carrozzieri	10	2	0	0	10	2
81	(Italy)	GK	Massimiliano Benassi	2	0	0	0	2	0
82	(Italy)	MF	Gennaro Delvecchio	7	0	0	0	7	0
91	(Italy)	MF	Andrea Bertolacci	3	0	0	0	3	0
			TOTALS	'113	9	1	0	114	9
