= 2011–12 AS Roma season =

Roma
2011–12 season
- President: Thomas DiBenedetto
- Manager: Luis Enrique
- Stadium: Stadio Olimpico
- Serie A: 7th
- Coppa Italia: Quarter-finals
- UEFA Europa League: Play-off round
- Top goalscorer: League: Dani Osvaldo (11); All: Dani Osvaldo (11)
- Highest home attendance: 50,801 vs Lazio (4 March 2012, Serie A)
- Lowest home attendance: 16,320 vs Fiorentina (11 January 2012, Coppa Italia)
- Average home league attendance: 36,219
Home colours	Away colours	Third colours

The 2011–12 season was Associazione Sportiva Roma's 84th in existence and 79th season in the top flight of Italian football. Before the season started Roma changed their manager. The now former manager Vincenzo Montella, did not get his contract extended and was therefore released. Later he was hired to be the new head coach for Catania. Instead, Roma selected former Real Madrid and Barcelona player Luis Enrique to be their new head coach. After a sixth-place finish in 2010–11, Roma were hoping to improve their position and to capture their fourth Scudetto. Roma was eliminated in the play-off round of Europa League after losing 2–1 on aggregate against Slovan Bratislava. Roma also competed in the Coppa Italia, being knocked out in the quarter-finals.

== Players ==
=== Squad information ===
Last updated on 13 May 2012
Appearances include league matches only

No.	Name	Nat	Position(s)	Date of birth (Age at end of season)	Signed from	Signed in	Apps.	Goals
Goalkeepers
1	Bogdan Lobonț	(Romania)	GK	18 January 1978 (aged 34)	(Romania) Dinamo București	2009	17	0
18	Gianluca Curci	(Italy)	GK	12 July 1985 (aged 26)	(Italy) Sampdoria	2011	3	0
24	Maarten Stekelenburg	(Netherlands)	GK	22 September 1982 (aged 29)	(Netherlands) Ajax	2011	29	0
Defenders
2	Cicinho	(Brazil)	RB	24 June 1980 (aged 32)	(Spain) Real Madrid	2007	62	3
3	José Ángel	(Spain)	LB	5 September 1989 (aged 22)	(Spain) Sporting Gijón	2011	27	0
4	Juan	(Brazil)	CB	1 February 1979 (aged 33)	(Germany) Bayer Leverkusen	2007	119	9
5	Gabriel Heinze	(Argentina)	CB / LB	19 April 1978 (aged 34)	(France) Marseille	2011	30	0
29	Nicolás Burdisso	(Argentina)	CB / RB	12 April 1981 (aged 31)	(Italy) Internazionale	2009	71	5
44	Simon Kjær	(Denmark)	CB	26 March 1989 (aged 23)	(Germany) Wolfsburg	2011	22	0
77	Marco Cassetti	(Italy)	RB	29 May 1977 (aged 35)	(Italy) Lecce	2006	143	4
87	Aleandro Rosi	(Italy)	RB	17 May 1987 (aged 25)	(Italy) Youth Sector	2004	74	3
Midfielders
7	Marquinho	(Brazil)	AM	3 July 1986 (aged 25)	(Brazil) Fluminense	2012	15	3
8	Erik Lamela	(Argentina)	AM	4 March 1992 (aged 20)	(Argentina) River Plate	2011	29	4
11	Rodrigo Taddei	(Brazil)	LM / RM / AM	6 March 1980 (aged 32)	(Italy) Siena	2005	201	23
15	Miralem Pjanić	(Bosnia and Herzegovina)	CM / AM	2 March 1990 (aged 22)	(France) Lyon	2011	30	3
16	Daniele De Rossi (Vice-Captain)	(Italy)	DM / CM	24 July 1983 (aged 28)	(Italy) Youth Sector	2001	281	33
19	Fernando Gago	(Argentina)	DM / CM	10 April 1986 (aged 26)	(Spain) Real Madrid	2011	30	1
20	Simone Perrotta	(Italy)	LM / CM / AM	17 September 1977 (aged 34)	(Italy) Chievo	2004	230	34
23	Leandro Greco	(Italy)	CM	19 July 1986 (aged 25)	(Italy) Youth Sector	2003	35	0
30	Fábio Simplício	(Brazil)	CM / AM	23 September 1979 (aged 32)	(Italy) Palermo	2010	43	8
92	Federico Viviani	(Italy)	CM	24 March 1992 (aged 20)	(Italy) Youth Sector	2011	6	0
94	Valerio Verre	(Italy)	CM	11 January 1994 (aged 18)	(Italy) Youth Sector	2011	0	0
Forwards
9	Dani Osvaldo	(Italy)	CF / ST	12 January 1986 (aged 26)	(Spain) Espanyol	2011	26	11
10	Francesco Totti (Captain)	(Italy)	AM / LW / SS / CF / ST	27 September 1976 (aged 35)	(Italy) Youth Sector	1992	501	215
14	Bojan Krkić	(Spain)	ST / SS	28 August 1990 (aged 21)	(Spain) Barcelona	2011	33	7
26	Junior Tallo	(Ivory Coast)	CF / ST	21 December 1992 (aged 19)	(Italy) Youth Sector	2011	3	0
31	Fabio Borini	(Italy)	CF / ST	29 March 1991 (aged 21)	(Italy) Parma	2011	24	9
40	Giammario Piscitella	(Italy)	CF / ST	24 March 1993 (aged 19)	(Italy) Youth Sector	2012	2	0
47	Gianluca Caprari	(Italy)	CF / ST	30 July 1993 (aged 18)	(Italy) Youth Sector	2011	3	0
Players transferred during the season
7	David Pizarro	(Chile)	CM / DM	11 September 1979 (aged 32)	(Italy) Internazionale	2006	148	9
22	Marco Borriello	(Italy)	CF / ST	18 June 1982 (aged 30)	(Italy) Milan	2010	41	11
33	Matteo Brighi	(Italy)	CM	14 February 1981 (aged 31)	(Italy) Juventus	2004	108	9
89	Stefano Okaka	(Italy)	CF / ST	9 August 1989 (aged 22)	(Italy) Youth Sector	2005	34	2

== Transfers ==
=== In ===
Date	Pos	Name	From	Fee
2 August 2011	GK	(Netherlands) Maarten Stekelenburg	(Netherlands) Ajax	€6.3M
22 July 2011	DF	(Argentina) Gabriel Heinze	(France) Marseille	Free
19 July 2011	DF	(Spain) José Ángel	(Spain) Sporting Gijón	€4.5M
31 August 2011	MF	(Bosnia and Herzegovina) Miralem Pjanić	(France) Lyon	€11M
7 August 2011	MF	(Argentina) Erik Lamela	(Argentina) River Plate	€12M
23 July 2011	FW	(Spain) Bojan Krkić	(Spain) Barcelona	€12M
25 August 2011	FW	(Italy) Dani Osvaldo	(Spain) Espanyol	€17.5M
24 June 2011	FW	(Italy) Marco Borriello	(Italy) Milan	€10M

Total spending: ▼€83.3M

==== Loans in ====
Date	Pos.	Name	From	Fee
31 August 2011	DF	(Denmark) Simon Kjær	(Germany) VfL Wolfsburg	€3M
31 August 2011	MF	(Argentina) Fernando Gago	(Spain) Real Madrid	€500,000
31 August 2011	FW	(Italy) Fabio Borini	(Italy) Parma	€1.25M

Total spending: ▼€4.75M

=== Out ===
Date	Pos	Name	To	Fee
15 July 2011	GK	(Brazil) Doni	(England) Liverpool	Free
1 July 2011	DF	(France) Philippe Mexès	(Italy) Milan	Free
12 July 2011	DF	(Norway) John Arne Riise	(England) Fulham	€2.8M
25 July 2011	FW	(France) Jérémy Ménez	(France) Paris Saint-Germain	€8M
30 July 2011	FW	(Montenegro) Mirko Vučinić	(Italy) Juventus	€15M

Total income: ▲€25.8M

Net Income: ▼€47.7M

==== Loans out ====
Date	Pos.	Name	From	Fee
28 July 2011	GK	(Brazil) Júlio Sérgio	(Italy) Lecce	Free
15 July 2011	MF	(Italy) Stefano Guberti	(Italy) Torino	Free
31 August 2011	MF	(Italy) Matteo Brighi	(Italy) Atalanta	Free
31 January 2012	MF	(Chile) David Pizarro	(England) Manchester City	Free

Total income: ▲€0M

Net Income: ▼€4.75M

== Pre-season and friendlies ==
23 July 2011 Friendly	Riscone Brunico (Italy)	0–10	(Italy) Roma	Riscone di Brunico, Italy
17:00 CEST (UTC+02:00)		Report	Totti 5'; Caprari 13'; Borriello 15', 32', 41'; Taddei 18'; Perrotta 33'; Viviani 38'; Verre 85'; Ménez 89'	Stadium: Parco Sportivo; Attendance: 2,500

23 July 2011 Friendly	Südtirol (Italy)	0–3	(Italy) Roma	Riscone di Brunico, Italy
17:00 CEST (UTC+02:00)		Report	Borriello 6'; Vučinić 62', 80'	Stadium: Parco Sportivo; Attendance: 2,500

26 July 2011 Innsbruck Cup	Paris Saint-Germain (France)	3–0	(Italy) Roma	Innsbruck, Austria
21:00 CEST (UTC+02:00)	Hoarau 1', 32'; Gameiro 31'	Report		Stadium: Tivoli-Neu; Attendance: 7,000

26 July 2011 Innsbruck Cup	Wacker Innsbruck (Austria)	0–1	(Italy) Roma	Innsbruck, Austria
22:00 CEST (UTC+02:00)		Report	Caprari 1'	Stadium: Tivoli-Neu; Attendance: 7,000

3 August 2011 Friendly	Vasas (Hungary)	0–1	(Italy) Roma	Budapest, Hungary
20:00 CEST (UTC+02:00)		Report	Viviani 69'	Stadium: Ferenc Puskás Stadium; Attendance: 5,000

12 August 2011 Trofeo Naranja	Valencia (Spain)	3–0	(Italy) Roma	Valencia, Spain
22:00 CEST (UTC+02:00)	Viviani 21' (o.g.); Soldado 36'; Alcácer 83'	Report		Stadium: Mestalla; Attendance: 45,000

== Competitions ==
=== Overall ===
Competition	Started round	Final position	First match	Last match
Serie A	Matchday 1	7th	11 September 2011	13 May 2012
Coppa Italia	Round of 16	Quarter-finals	11 January 2012	24 January 2012
Europa League	Play-off round	Play-off round	18 August 2011	25 August 2011

Last updated: 13 May 2012

=== Serie A ===
==== League table ====
Pos	Team	Pld	W	D	L	GF	GA	GD	Pts	Qualification or relegation
5	Napoli	38	16	13	9	66	46	+20	61	Qualification to Europa League group stage (Note: Napoli qualified to the group stage of the Europa League as winner of the 2011–12 Coppa Italia. As they finished fifth, the sixth-placed team of the league also qualified for the Europa League.)
6	Internazionale	38	17	7	14	58	55	+3	58	Qualification to Europa League third qualifying round
7	Roma	38	16	8	14	60	54	+6	56 (Note: Roma finished ahead of Parma on head–to–head away goals scored: Parma 0–1 Roma, Roma 1–0 Parma.)	
8	Parma	38	15	11	12	54	53	+1	56	
9	Bologna	38	13	12	13	41	43	−2	51	

Source: Lega Serie A
Rules for classification: 1) points; 2) head-to-head points; 3) head-to-head goal difference; 4) head-to-head goals scored; 5) goal difference; 6) number of goals scored

==== Results summary ====
Overall								Home						Away					
Pld	W	D	L	GF	GA	GD	Pts	W	D	L	GF	GA	GD	W	D	L	GF	GA	GD
38	16	8	14	60	54	+6	56	10	5	4	39	22	+17	6	3	10	21	32	−11

Last updated: 13 May 2012.
Source: Competitive matches

==== Results by round ====
Round	1	2	3	4	5	6	7	8	9	10	11	12	13	14	15	16	17	18	19	20	21	22	23	24	25	26	27	28	29	30	31	32	33	34	35	36	37	38
Ground	A	H	A	H	A	H	A	H	A	H	A	H	A	A	H	A	H	A	H	H	A	H	A	H	A	H	A	H	A	H	A	H	H	A	H	A	H	A
Result	W	L	D	D	W	W	L	W	L	L	W	W	L	L	D	W	W	D	W	D	L	W	L	W	L	L	W	W	L	W	L	W	L	L	D	D	D	W
Position	15	15	14	11	6	12	6	9	13	7	5	7	8	10	7	7	7	7	6	6	6	6	6	5	6	6	6	6	6	6	6	5	6	7	7	7	7	7

Updated to match(es) played on 13 May 2012. Source: Competitive matches
A = Away; H = Home; W = Win; D = Draw; L = Loss

==== Matches ====
11 September 2011 2	Roma	1–2	Cagliari	Rome
15:00 CEST (UTC+02:00)	José Ángel (red card) 69'; De Rossi 90+6'	Report	Conti 68', (yellow card) 68'; Agazzi (yellow card) 77'; Nenê (yellow card) 80'; Nainggolan (yellow card) 82'; El Kabir (yellow card) 89', (goal) 90+4'	Stadium: Stadio Olimpico; Attendance: 41,000; Referee: Gabriele Gava

17 September 2011 3	Internazionale	0–0	Roma	Milan
20:45 CEST (UTC+02:00)	Lúcio (yellow card) 16'	Report	Kjær (yellow card) 83'	Stadium: San Siro; Attendance: 47,944; Referee: Paolo Mazzoleni

22 September 2011 4	Roma	1–1	Siena	Rome
15:00 CEST (UTC+02:00)	Osvaldo 24'; Burdisso (yellow card) 82'	Report	Vitiello 88'; Rossi (yellow card) 90+1'	Stadium: Stadio Olimpico; Attendance: 34,896; Referee: Marco Guida

25 September 2011 5	Parma	0–1	Roma	Parma
20:45 CEST (UTC+02:00)	Zaccardo (yellow card) 64'; Giovinco (yellow card) 90+4'	Report	Kjær (yellow card) 35'; Osvaldo 50'; Lobonț (yellow card) 73'; De Rossi (yellow card) 90'	Stadium: Stadio Ennio Tardini; Attendance: 12,822; Referee: Daniele Orsato

1 October 2011 6	Roma	3–1	Atalanta	Rome
18:00 CEST (UTC+02:00)	Bojan 20'; Osvaldo 31'; Simplício (yellow card) 49', (goal) 81'	Report	Denis 48'; Cigarini (yellow card) 53'; Padoin (yellow card) 60'; Capelli (yellow card) 75'	Stadium: Stadio Olimpico; Attendance: 36,200; Referee: Domenico Celi

16 October 2011 7	Lazio	2–1	Roma	Rome
20:45 CEST (UTC+02:00)	Hernanes 51' (pen.); Brocchi (yellow card) 62'; Cissé (yellow card) 73'; Klose 90+3'	Report	Osvaldo 5', (yellow card) 6'; Perrotta (yellow card) 7'; De Rossi (yellow card) 28'; Kjær (red card) 50'; Cassetti (yellow card) 78'	Stadium: Stadio Olimpico; Attendance: 51,265; Referee: Paolo Tagliavento

23 October 2011 8	Roma	1–0	Palermo	Rome
15:00 CEST (UTC+02:00)	Lamela 8'; Pizarro (yellow card) 20'; Cassetti (yellow card) 34'; Gago (yellow card) 49'	Report	Hernández (yellow card) 15'; Della Rocca (yellow card) 52'; Migliaccio (yellow card) 67'	Stadium: Stadio Olimpico; Attendance: 35,738; Referee: Mauro Bergonzi

26 October 2011 9	Genoa	2–1	Roma	Genoa
20:45 CEST (UTC+02:00)	Janković 38'; Seymour (yellow card) 49'; Kucka 89'; Merkel (yellow card) 90+1'	Report	Borini 82'; Burdisso (yellow card) 90+2'	Stadium: Stadio Luigi Ferraris; Attendance: 21,235; Referee: Andrea Gervasoni

29 October 2011 10	Roma	2–3	Milan	Rome
18:00 CEST (UTC+02:00)	Burdisso 28'; Gago (yellow card) 51'; Pjanić (yellow card) 59'; Bojan 88'	Report	Ibrahimović 17', 78'; Nesta 30'; Van Bommel (yellow card) 32'; Nocerino (yellow card) 53'; Boateng (red card) 67'; Aquilani (yellow card) 89'	Stadium: Stadio Olimpico; Attendance: 43,978; Referee: Antonio Damato

5 November 2011 11	Novara	0–2	Roma	Novara
20:45 CET (UTC+01:00)	Paci (yellow card) 48'; Porcari (yellow card) 72'	Report	Cassetti (yellow card) 12'; Pjanić (yellow card) 29'; Bojan 73'; Osvaldo 76'	Stadium: Stadio Silvio Piola; Attendance: 11,958; Referee: Gianluca Rocchi

20 November 2011 12	Roma	2–1	Lecce	Rome
20:45 CET (UTC+01:00)	Pjanić 25'; Gago 54', (yellow card) 71'	Report	Bertolacci 61'; Strasser (yellow card) 90+1'; Corvia (yellow card) 90+4'	Stadium: Stadio Olimpico; Attendance: 30,768; Referee: Christian Brighi

25 November 2011 13	Udinese	2–0	Roma	Udine
20:45 CET (UTC+01:00)	Benatia (yellow card) 22'; Danilo (yellow card) 41'; Di Natale 79'; Armero (yellow card) 82'; Isla 89'	Report	Pjanić (yellow card) 37'; Juan (yellow card) 62'	Stadium: Stadio Friuli; Attendance: 18,310; Referee: Luca Banti

4 December 2011 14	Fiorentina	3–0	Roma	Florence
15:00 CET (UTC+01:00)	Jovetić 17' (pen.); Gamberini 44'; Silva 86' (pen.)	Report	Juan (red card) 16'; Gago (yellow card) 62' (yellow-red card) 76'; Bojan (red card) 85'	Stadium: Stadio Artemio Franchi; Attendance: 21,863; Referee: Antonio Damato

12 December 2011 15	Roma	1–1	Juventus	Rome
20:45 CET (UTC+01:00)	De Rossi 6', (yellow card) 90+1'; Pjanić (yellow card) 52'; Greco (yellow card) 66'	Report	Chiellini 61'; Vidal (yellow card) 63'; Bonucci (yellow card) 67'; Quagliarella (yellow card) 69'	Stadium: Stadio Olimpico; Attendance: 49,547; Referee: Daniele Orsato

18 December 2011 16	Napoli	1–3	Roma	Naples
20:45 CET (UTC+01:00)	Hamšík 82'	Report	De Sanctis 3' (o.g.); Rosi (yellow card) 50'; Totti (yellow card) 55'; Osvaldo 59'; Simplício 90'	Stadium: Stadio San Paolo; Attendance: 38,048; Referee: Domenico Celi

21 December 2011 1	Bologna	0–2	Roma	Bologna
20:45 CET (UTC+01:00)	Diamanti (yellow card) 18'; Kone (yellow card) 69'; Pérez (yellow card) 76'; Raggi (yellow card) 76'; Portanova (red card) 77'	Report	Osvaldo (yellow card) 7', (goal) 40'; Taddei 17'; Rosi (yellow card) 20'	Stadium: Stadio Renato Dall'Ara; Attendance: 17,855; Referee: Andrea De Marco
Note: Rescheduled from August

8 January 2012 17	Roma	2–0	Chievo	Rome
15:00 CET (UTC+01:00)	Bojan (yellow card) 13'; Totti 34' (pen.), 77' (pen.), (yellow card) 35'; Heinze (yellow card) 84'	Report	Hetemaj (yellow card) 74'; Cesar (yellow card) 77'	Stadium: Stadio Olimpico; Attendance: 38,054; Referee: Carmine Russo

21 January 2012 19	Roma	5–1	Cesena	Rome
18:00 CET (UTC+01:00)	Totti 1', 8'; Borini 9'; Juan 62'; Pjanić 70'	Report	Éder 58'; Benalouane (yellow card) 77'	Stadium: Stadio Olimpico; Attendance: 32,347; Referee: Antonio Danilo Giannoccaro

29 January 2012 20	Roma	1–1	Bologna	Rome
15:00 CET (UTC+01:00)	Juan (yellow card) 54'; Pjanić 62'	Report	Di Vaio 57', (yellow card) 57'; Portanova (yellow card) 59'	Stadium: Stadio Olimpico; Attendance: 34,073; Referee: Marco Guida

1 February 2012 21	Cagliari	4–2	Roma	Cagliari
20:45 CET (UTC+01:00)	Thiago Ribeiro 7', 49'; Pinilla 41'; Astori (yellow card) 47'; Nainggolan (yellow card) 70'; Ekdal 90+2'; Cossu (yellow card) 90+3'	Report	Juan 13'; Kjær (yellow card) 32'; Borini 34', (yellow card) 65'; Lamela (yellow card) 45'	Stadium: Stadio Sant'Elia; Attendance: 9,500; Referee: Andrea Romeo

4 February 2012 22	Roma	4–0	Internazionale	Rome
15:00 CET (UTC+01:00)	Juan 13', (yellow card) 86'; Borini 41', 48'; De Rossi (yellow card) 55'; Taddei (yellow card) 75'; Bojan 89'	Report	Maicon (yellow card) 56'; Faraoni (yellow card) 70'	Stadium: Stadio Olimpico; Attendance: 33,445; Referee: Andrea De Marco

8 February 2012 18	Catania	1–1	Roma	Catania
20:00 CET (UTC+01:00)	Spolli (yellow card) 19'; Legrottaglie 24'; Potenza (yellow card) 36'; Bergessio (yellow card) 50'; Bellusci (yellow card) 69'; Lodi (yellow card) 83'	Report	Simplício (yellow card) 7'; De Rossi 28', (yellow card) 29'; Pjanić (yellow card) 79'; Taddei (yellow card) 90'	Stadium: Stadio Angelo Massimino; Attendance: 16,436; Referee: Paolo Tagliavento
Note: Originally scheduled for 15 January, play was suspended after 65 minutes; play was resumed on 8 February from the point of suspension.

13 February 2012 23	Siena	1–0	Roma	Siena
20:45 CET (UTC+01:00)	Calaiò 51' (pen.); Grossi (yellow card) 87'	Report	Totti (yellow card) 41'; Kjær (yellow card) 50'	Stadium: Stadio Artemio Franchi – Montepaschi Arena; Attendance: 9,288; Referee: Gianluca Rocchi

19 February 2012 24	Roma	1–0	Parma	Rome
15:00 CET (UTC+01:00)	Totti (yellow card) 25'; Borini 26'	Report	Ferrario (yellow card) 24'; Lucarelli (yellow card) 38'; Musacci (yellow card) 84'	Stadium: Stadio Olimpico; Attendance: 29,433; Referee: Sebastiano Peruzzo

26 February 2012 25	Atalanta	4–1	Roma	Bergamo
15:00 CET (UTC+01:00)	Marilungo 10'; Denis 20', 47', 66'; Moralez (yellow card) 45+3'; Cigarini (yellow card) 53'; Manfredini (yellow card) 59'; Peluso (yellow card) 87'	Report	Gago (yellow card) 20'; Borini 36'; Osvaldo (red card) 54'; Greco (yellow card) 79'; Cassetti (red card) 82'	Stadium: Stadio Atleti Azzurri d'Italia; Attendance: 16,117; Referee: Antonio Damato

4 March 2012 26	Roma	1–2	Lazio	Rome
15:00 CET (UTC+01:00)	Stekelenburg (red card) 7'; Borini 16', (yellow card) 88'; Heinze (yellow card) 61'; Bojan (yellow card) 90'; Totti (yellow card) 90'	Report	Hernanes 10' (pen.); Scaloni (yellow card) 15' (yellow-red card) 86'; Matuzalém (yellow card) 26'; Biava (yellow card) 37'; Mauri (yellow card) 45+1', (goal) 61'; Diakité (yellow card) 87'	Stadium: Stadio Olimpico; Attendance: 50,801; Referee: Mauro Bergonzi

10 March 2012 27	Palermo	0–1	Roma	Palermo
20:45 CET (UTC+01:00)	Barreto (yellow card) 5'; Pisano (yellow card) 21'; Muñoz (yellow card) 63'; Miccoli (yellow card) 76'	Report	Borini 3'; Lobonț (yellow card) 59'; Heinze (yellow card) 69'	Stadium: Stadio Renzo Barbera; Attendance: 16,451; Referee: Luca Banti

19 March 2012 28	Roma	1–0	Genoa	Rome
20:45 CET (UTC+01:00)	Osvaldo 3'; De Rossi (yellow card) 37'	Report	Janković (yellow card) 52'; Kaladze (yellow card) 74'	Stadium: Stadio Olimpico; Attendance: 31,460; Referee: Antonio Danilo Giannoccaro

25 March 2012 29	Milan	2–1	Roma	Milan
18:00 CET (UTC+01:00)	Ibrahimović (yellow card) 30', (goal) 53' (pen.), 83'; Mesbah (yellow card) 58'; Muntari (yellow card) 90+3'	Report	Osvaldo (yellow card) 29', (goal) 44'; Heinze (yellow card) 52'	Stadium: San Siro; Attendance: 59,133; Referee: Paolo Mazzoleni

1 April 2012 30	Roma	5–2	Novara	Rome
12:30 CEST (UTC+02:00)	Marquinho 25'; Osvaldo 34'; Simplício 55'; Bojan 62', (yellow card) 62'; Lamela 90+2'	Report	Caracciolo 17'; Paci (yellow card) 58'; Morimoto 78'	Stadium: Stadio Olimpico; Attendance: 38,237; Referee: Andrea Romeo

7 April 2012 31	Lecce	4–2	Roma	Lecce
15:00 CEST (UTC+02:00)	Muriel 22', 49'; Di Michele 44', 56' (pen.), (yellow card) 72'; Delvecchio (yellow card) 48'; Blasi (yellow card) 66'; Migliónico (yellow card) 89'	Report	José Ángel (yellow card) 4'; Marquinho (yellow card) 87'; Bojan 88'; Lamela 90'	Stadium: Stadio Via del Mare; Attendance: 12,592; Referee: Daniele Orsato

11 April 2012 32	Roma	3–1	Udinese	Rome
20:45 CEST (UTC+02:00)	Osvaldo 8'; Marquinho (yellow card) 81', (goal) 90+2'; Totti 86'; De Rossi (yellow card) 89'	Report	Fernandes 43'; Pinzi (yellow card) 65'	Stadium: Stadio Olimpico; Attendance: 29,672; Referee: Nicola Rizzoli

22 April 2012 34	Juventus	4–0	Roma	Turin
20:45 CEST (UTC+02:00)	Vidal 4', 8'; Pirlo 28'; Quagliarella (yellow card) 32'; Marchisio 53'	Report	Stekelenburg (red card) 26'; Bojan (yellow card) 85'	Stadium: Juventus Stadium; Attendance: 39,542; Referee: Mauro Bergonzi

25 April 2012 33	Roma	1–2	Fiorentina	Rome
15:00 CEST (UTC+02:00)	José Ángel (yellow card) 24'; Totti (yellow card) 41', (goal) 71'; De Rossi (yellow card) 90'; Osvaldo (red card) 90+3'	Report	Jovetić 2'; Boruc (yellow card) 57'; De Silvestri (yellow card) 82'; Behrami (yellow card) 88'; Natali (yellow card) 89'; Lazzari 90+2'	Stadium: Stadio Olimpico; Attendance: 36,287; Referee: Christian Brighi
Note: Postponed from 15 April due to the death of Piermario Morosini.

28 April 2012 35	Roma	2–2	Napoli	Rome
20:45 CEST (UTC+02:00)	Taddei (yellow card) 34'; Marquinho 41', (yellow card) 80'; Heinze (yellow card) 76'; Gago (yellow card) 79'; Simplício 88', (yellow card) 89'; Borini (yellow card) 90+3'	Report	Zúñiga 49'; Džemaili (yellow card) 50'; Cavani 67'	Stadium: Stadio Olimpico; Attendance: 29,643; Referee: Nicola Rizzoli

1 May 2012 36	Chievo	0–0	Roma	Verona
18:00 CEST (UTC+02:00)	Rigoni (yellow card) 37'; Sardo (yellow card) 61'; Hetemaj (yellow card) 64'; Uribe (yellow card) 85'	Report	José Ángel (yellow card) 54'; Gago (yellow card) 87'; Totti (yellow card) 89'	Stadium: Stadio Marc'Antonio Bentegodi; Attendance: 7,500; Referee: Luca Banti

5 May 2012 37	Roma	2–2	Catania	Rome
20:45 CEST (UTC+02:00)	De Rossi (yellow card) 45'; Totti 52', 77'; Heinze (yellow card) 57'; Pjanić (yellow card) 68'; Taddei (yellow card) 83'	Report	Barrientos (yellow card) 45+1'; Lodi 58' (pen.), (yellow card) 83'; Marchese 67'	Stadium: Stadio Olimpico; Attendance: 32,585; Referee: Sebastiano Peruzzo

13 May 2012 38	Cesena	2–3	Roma	Cesena
18:00 CEST (UTC+02:00)	Del Nero 9', (yellow card) 20'; Santana 90'	Report	Bojan 27'; Lamela 31'; De Rossi 49'	Stadium: Stadio Dino Manuzzi; Attendance: 14,883; Referee: Carmine Russo

=== Coppa Italia ===
11 January 2012 Round of 16	Roma	3–0	Fiorentina	Rome
20:45 CET (UTC+01:00)	Lamela 53', 66'; Borini 75'		Ljajić (yellow card) 53'	Stadium: Stadio Olimpico; Attendance: 16,320; Referee: Andrea De Marco

24 January 2012 Quarter-finals	Juventus	3–0	Roma	Turin
20:45 CET (UTC+01:00)	Giaccherini 6'; Del Piero 30'; Barzagli (yellow card) 32'; Krasić (yellow card) 89'; Kjær 90' (o.g.)		Pjanić (yellow card) 38'; Simplício (yellow card) 66'; Lamela (red card) 68'; Totti (yellow card) 71'	Stadium: Juventus Stadium; Attendance: 38,498; Referee: Luca Banti

=== UEFA Europa League ===
Having qualified for the Europa League play-off round in the previous Serie A campaign, Roma played a double-legged match for their chance to enter the Europa League. On August 5, 2011, Roma drew Slovakian side ŠK Slovan Bratislava. Roma was eliminated from Europa League after losing 2–1 on aggregate.

==== Play-off round ====
18 August 2011 First leg	Slovan Bratislava (Slovakia)	1–0	(Italy) Roma	Bratislava, Slovakia
20:45 CEST (UTC+02:00)	Dobrotka 80'	Report		Stadium: Štadión Pasienky; Attendance: 10,548; Referee: Antonio Mateu Lahoz (Spain)

25 August 2011 Second leg	Roma (Italy)	1–1 (1–2 agg.)	(Slovakia) Slovan Bratislava	Rome, Italy
20:45 CEST (UTC+02:00)	Perrotta 11'; José Ángel (yellow card) 81'; Viviani (yellow card) 87'	Report	Štepanovský 82'; Šebo (yellow card) 86'	Stadium: Stadio Olimpico; Attendance: 47,302; Referee: Halis Özkahya (Turkey)

== Statistics ==
=== Appearances and goals ===
No.	Pos	Nat	Player	Total		Serie A		Coppa Italia		Europa League	
No.	Pos	Nat	Player	Apps	Goals	Apps	Goals	Apps	Goals	Apps	Goals
Goalkeepers
1	GK	(Romania) ROU	Bogdan Lobonț	9	0	7+2	0	0	0	0	0
18	GK	(Italy) ITA	Gianluca Curci	3	0	2+1	0	0	0	0	0
24	GK	(Netherlands) NED	Maarten Stekelenburg	33	0	29	0	2	0	2	0
Defenders
2	DF	(Brazil) BRA	Cicinho	5	0	1+1	0	1	0	2	0
3	DF	(Spain) ESP	José Ángel	31	0	24+3	0	1+1	0	2	0
4	DF	(Brazil) BRA	Juan	16	3	16	3	0	0	0	0
5	DF	(Argentina) ARG	Gabriel Heinze	32	0	27+3	0	2	0	0	0
29	DF	(Argentina) ARG	Nicolás Burdisso	12	1	8+2	1	0	0	2	0
44	DF	(Denmark) DEN	Simon Kjær	24	0	20+2	0	2	0	0	0
77	DF	(Italy) ITA	Marco Cassetti	9	0	3+4	0	0	0	2	0
87	DF	(Italy) ITA	Aleandro Rosi	22	0	21	0	0	0	0+1	0
Midfielders
7	MF	(Brazil) BRA	Marquinho	15	3	10+5	3	0	0	0	0
8	MF	(Argentina) ARG	Erik Lamela	31	6	23+6	4	2	2	0	0
11	MF	(Brazil) BRA	Rodrigo Taddei	26	1	24	1	2	0	0	0
15	MF	(Bosnia and Herzegovina) BIH	Miralem Pjanić	31	3	29+1	3	1	0	0	0
16	MF	(Italy) ITA	Daniele De Rossi	32	4	32	4	0	0	0	0
19	MF	(Argentina) ARG	Fernando Gago	32	1	24+6	1	2	0	0	0
20	MF	(Italy) ITA	Simone Perrotta	23	1	8+11	0	0+2	0	1+1	1
23	MF	(Italy) ITA	Leandro Greco	21	0	9+10	0	1+1	0	0	0
30	MF	(Brazil) BRA	Fábio Simplício	22	4	9+10	4	1	0	2	0
92	MF	(Italy) ITA	Federico Viviani	9	0	2+4	0	1	0	2	0
94	MF	(Italy) ITA	Valerio Verre	1	0	0	0	0	0	0+1	0
Forwards
9	FW	(Italy) ITA	Dani Osvaldo	26	11	24+2	11	0	0	0	0
10	FW	(Italy) ITA	Francesco Totti	31	8	26+1	8	2	0	1+1	0
14	FW	(Spain) ESP	Bojan Krkić	37	7	13+20	7	2	0	2	0
26	FW	(Ivory Coast) CIV	Junior Tallo	3	0	0+3	0	0	0	0	0
31	FW	(Italy) ITA	Fabio Borini	26	10	20+4	9	0+2	1	0	0
40	FW	(Italy) ITA	Giammario Piscitella	2	0	0+2	0	0	0	0	0
47	FW	(Italy) ITA	Gianluca Caprari	3	0	0+1	0	0	0	2	0
Players transferred out during the season
7	MF	(Chile) CHI	David Pizarro	7	0	5+2	0	0	0	0	0
22	FW	(Italy) ITA	Marco Borriello	8	0	2+5	0	0	0	0+1	0
33	MF	(Italy) ITA	Matteo Brighi	1	0	0	0	0	0	1	0
89	FW	(Italy) ITA	Stefano Okaka	2	0	0	0	0	0	1+1	0

Last updated: 13 May 2012
Source: Competitions

=== Goalscorers ===
Rank	No.	Pos	Nat	Name	Serie A	Coppa Italia	UEFA EL	Total
1	9	FW	(Italy)	Dani Osvaldo	11	0	0	11
2	31	FW	(Italy)	Fabio Borini	9	1	0	10
3	10	FW	(Italy)	Francesco Totti	8	0	0	8
4	14	FW	(Spain)	Bojan Krkić	7	0	0	7
5	8	MF	(Argentina)	Erik Lamela	4	2	0	6
6	16	MF	(Italy)	Daniele De Rossi	4	0	0	4
6	30	MF	(Brazil)	Fábio Simplício	4	0	0	4
8	4	DF	(Brazil)	Juan	3	0	0	3
8	7	MF	(Brazil)	Marquinho	3	0	0	3
8	15	MF	(Bosnia and Herzegovina)	Miralem Pjanić	3	0	0	3
11	11	MF	(Brazil)	Rodrigo Taddei	1	0	0	1
11	19	MF	(Argentina)	Fernando Gago	1	0	0	1
11	20	MF	(Italy)	Simone Perrotta	0	0	1	1
11	29	DF	(Argentina)	Nicolás Burdisso	1	0	0	1
Own goal					1	0	0	1
Totals					60	3	1	64

Last updated: 13 May 2012

=== Clean sheets ===
Rank	No.	Pos	Nat	Name	Serie A	Coppa Italia	UEFA EL	Total
1	24	GK	(Netherlands)	Maarten Stekelenburg	8	1	0	9
2	1	GK	(Romania)	Bogdan Lobonț	2	0	0	2
3	18	GK	(Italy)	Gianluca Curci	1	0	0	1
Totals					11	1	0	12

Last updated: 13 May 2012
