= 2010–11 Genoa CFC season =

Football team season

Genoa
2010–11 season
- Chairman: Enrico Preziosi
- Manager: Gian Piero Gasperini (until 8 November 2010); Davide Ballardini (from 8 November 2010)
- Serie A: 10th
- Coppa Italia: Round of 16
- Top goalscorer: League: Antonio Floro Flores (10); All: Antonio Floro Flores (10)
Home colours	Away colours	Third colours

During the 2010–11 season, Genoa competed in the Serie A, the top division of Italian football, and the Coppa Italia.

== Players ==
Note: Flags indicate national team as defined under FIFA eligibility rules; some limited exceptions apply. Players may hold more than one non-FIFA nationality.

No.	Pos.	Nation	Player
1	GK	POR	Eduardo
2	DF	ESP	Chico Flores
3	DF	ITA	Dario Dainelli
4	DF	ITA	Domenico Criscito
5	MF	FRA	Abdoulay Konko
7	MF	ITA	Marco Rossi (captain)
8	FW	ARG	Rodrigo Palacio
9	FW	ARG	Mauro Boselli (on loan from Wigan Athletic)
13	DF	GEO	Kakha Kaladze
18	DF	BRA	Rafinha
20	DF	ITA	Giandomenico Mesto
22	FW	ITA	Mattia Destro (on loan from Internazionale)
24	DF	ITA	Emiliano Moretti

No.	Pos.	Nation	Player
25	FW	GHA	Richmond Boakye
29	FW	SLO	Enej Jelenič
36	MF	ARG	Franco Zuculini (on loan from 1899 Hoffenheim)
42	MF	POR	Miguel Veloso
43	FW	ITA	Alberto Paloschi
71	MF	SRB	Boško Janković
73	GK	ITA	Alessio Scarpi
77	MF	ITA	Omar Milanetto
83	FW	ITA	Antonio Floro Flores (on loan from Udinese)
88	GK	ITA	Mattia Perin
—	FW	URU	Federico Rodríguez

=== Out on loan from previous season ===
Note: Flags indicate national team as defined under FIFA eligibility rules; some limited exceptions apply. Players may hold more than one non-FIFA nationality.

No.	Pos.	Nation	Player
—	GK	ITA	Eugenio Lamanna (at Gubbio)
—	DF	ITA	Matteo Amico (at Cosenza)
—	DF	ITA	Matteo D'Alessandro (at Reggiana)
—	DF	ITA	Andrea Esposito (at Livorno)
—	DF	ITA	Francesco Modesto (at Bologna)
—	DF	ITA	Andrea Ranocchia (at Bari)
—	DF	ITA	Fabrizio Rondinara (at Gubbio)
—	DF	ITA	Mariano Stendardo (at Salernitana)
—	DF	DEN	Magnus Troest (at Recreativo Huelva)
—	MF	ITA	Francesco Bolzoni (at Frosinone)
—	MF	ITA	Loris Damonte (at Alessandria)
—	MF	ARG	Emmanuel Ledesma (at Novara)
—	MF	CMR	Louisse Parfait (at Piacenza)

No.	Pos.	Nation	Player
—	MF	SUI	Carlo Polli (at Locarno)
—	MF	ITA	Silvano Raggio Garibaldi (at Sorrento)
—	MF	URU	Marcel Román (at Peñarol)
—	FW	ITA	Umberto Eusepi (at Viareggio)
—	FW	ITA	Fernando Forestieri (at Málaga)
—	FW	ITA	Giuseppe Greco (at Cesena)
—	RW	ITA	Gabriele Mazzei (at F.S.Chinese Chuklers 2025)
—	GK	ITA	Archie Lambert (at Chinese Chuklers 2025)
—	Bench Warmer	FRA	Matt Noblet (at Chinese Chuklers 2025)
—	FW	ITA	Vincenzo Rennella (at Grasshoppers)
—	MF	BIH	Goran Galešić (at Lugano)

=== Out on loan 2010–11 ===
Note: Flags indicate national team as defined under FIFA eligibility rules; some limited exceptions apply. Players may hold more than one non-FIFA nationality.

No.	Pos.	Nation	Player
—	MF	SLE	Rodney Strasser (Co-ownership with Milan)
—	FW	NGR	Nnamdi Oduamadi (Co-ownership with Milan)
22	MF	AUT	Robert Gucher (at Frosinone)
27	FW	SLO	Dejan Lazarević (at Torino)
31	MF	GHA	Isaac Cofie (at Torino)
32	GK	ITA	Marco Amelia (at Milan)
33	FW	SRB	Danijel Aleksić (at Crotone)
—	MF	ITA	Stephan El Shaarawy (at Padova)
—	MF	ITA	Francesco Bolzoni (at Siena)
—	DF	DEN	Magnus Troest (at Atalanta)
—	DF	ITA	Andrea Esposito (at Bologna)
—	DF	ITA	Matteo D'Alessandro (at Reggiana)
—	MF	CMR	Louisse Essengue Parfait (at Crotone)

No.	Pos.	Nation	Player
—	DF	ITA	Andrea Signorini (at Benevento)
—	FW	ITA	Umberto Eusepi (at Varese)
—	MF	SUI	Carlo Polli (at Chiasso)
—	FW	ITA	Luigi Scotto (at Pergocrema)
—	MF	ITA	Mattia Ferraro (at Fano)
—	DF	ITA	Leonardo Terigi (at Crotone)
—	FW	ITA	Matteo Chinellato (at Reggiana)
—	MF	ITA	Arturo Ymeri (at Savona)
—	DF	ITA	Alessio Grea (at Ravenna)
—	DF	ITA	Matteo Amico (at Giacomense)
—	DF	TUN	Selim Ben Djemia (at Frosinone)
—	MF	GRE	Panagiotis Tachtsidis (at Cesena)

== Transfers ==
=== In ===
Date	Player	From	Fee	Notes
1 February 2010	(Hungary) Gergely Rudolf	Debrecen	Free	
21 April 2010	(Greece) Panagiotis Tachtsidis	AEK Athens	Free	
18 May 2010	(Brazil) Diego Ângelo	Naval	Free	
24 June 2010	(Austria) Robert Gucher	Frosinone	Undisclosed	Co-ownership
1 July 2010	(Italy) Luca Toni	Bayern Munich	Free	
26 July 2010	(Argentina) Franco Zuculini	1899 Hoffenheim	Loan	£750,000
10 July 2010	(Portugal) Eduardo	Braga	€4,500,000	
30 July 2010	(Portugal) Miguel Veloso	Sporting CP	€9,000,000	

=== Out ===
Date	Player	To	Fee	Notes
14 June 2010	(Croatia) Ivan Jurić	Unattached	Retired	
23 June 2010	(Italy) Sergio Floccari	Lazio	€8,500,000	

=== Out on loan ===
Date	Player	To	End Date	Notes
23 June 2010	(Italy) Marco Amelia	Milan	End of season	co-ownership option
24 June 2010	(Tunisia) Selim Ben Djemia	Frosinone	End of season	co-ownership option
24 June 2010	(Austria) Robert Gucher	Frosinone	End of season	

=== Co-ownership ===
Date	Name	Co-Owner (active)	Passive club (Mother club)	Result	Fee
24 June 2010	(Italy) Leonardo Bonucci	Bari	Genoa	Bari	€8M
	(Italy) Riccardo Meggiorini	Bari	Genoa	Genoa	Auction
	(Portugal) Diogo Tavares	Frosinone	Genoa	Frosinone	
	(Italy) Salvatore Aurelio	Frosinone	Genoa	Frosinone	
	(Italy) Alessandro Potenza	Catania	Genoa	Catania	
	(Argentina) Fernando Forestieri	Udinese	Genoa	Renewed	
	(Senegal) Papa Waigo	Fiorentina	Genoa	Fiorentina	
	(Brazil) Santos	Reggina	Genoa	Reggina	
	(Italy) Francesco Renzetti	Padova	Genoa	Padova	
	(Italy) Danilo Russo	Vicenza	Genoa	Renewed	
25 June 2010	(Italy) Raffaele Palladino	Genoa	Juventus	Renewed	
25 June 2010	(Italy) Domenico Criscito	Genoa	Juventus	Genoa	€6M
24 June 2010	(Montenegro) Ivan Fatić	Genoa	Chievo	Renewed	
	(Italy) Andrea Esposito	Genoa	Lecce	Renewed	

== Squad stats ==
As of 15 May

No.	Pos	Nat	Player	Total		Serie A		Coppa Italia	
No.	Pos	Nat	Player	Apps	Goals	Apps	Goals	Apps	Goals
1	GK	(Portugal) POR	Eduardo	37	-45	37	-45	0	0
2	MF	(Spain) ESP	Chico Flores	16	0	15	0	1	0
3	DF	(Italy) ITA	Dario Dainelli	34	1	33	1	1	0
4	DF	(Italy) ITA	Domenico Criscito	36	0	35	0	1	0
5	MF	(France) FRA	Abdoulay Konko	13	0	13	0	0	0
5	DF	(Serbia) SRB	Nenad Tomović	2	0	0	0	2	0
7	MF	(Italy) ITA	Marco Rossi	31	2	31	2	0	0
8	FW	(Argentina) ARG	Rodrigo Palacio	28	8	26	8	2	0
9	FW	(Argentina) ARG	Mauro Boselli	6	2	6	2	0	0
9	FW	(Italy) ITA	Luca Toni	18	7	16	3	2	4
10	FW	(Italy) ITA	Raffaele Palladino	6	0	5	0	1	0
11	MF	(Morocco) MAR	Houssine Kharja	15	1	13	0	2	1
13	DF	(Georgia (country)) GEO	Kakha Kaladze	27	1	25	1	2	0
14	FW	(Italy) ITA	Giuseppe Sculli	9	1	8	0	1	1
16	DF	(Italy) ITA	Andrea Ranocchia	17	2	16	2	1	0
17	FW	(Hungary) HUN	Gergely Rudolf	34	2	31	2	3	0
18	DF	(Brazil) BRA	Rafinha	36	2	33	2	3	0
20	MF	(Italy) ITA	Giandomenico Mesto	37	2	35	2	2	0
22	FW	(Italy) ITA	Mattia Destro	18	3	16	2	2	1
23	DF	(Italy) ITA	Luca Antonelli	10	1	10	1	0	0
23	DF	(Italy) ITA	Francesco Modesto	2	0	1	0	1	0
24	DF	(Italy) ITA	Emiliano Moretti	20	0	17	0	3	0
25	FW	(Ghana) GHA	Richmond Boakye	5	0	4	0	1	0
29	FW	(Slovenia) SLO	Enej Jelenič	3	0	2	0	1	0
33	MF	(Slovakia) SVK	Juraj Kucka	17	0	16	0	1	0
35	DF	(Uruguay) URU	Diego Polenta	1	0	1	0	0	0
36	MF	(Argentina) ARG	Franco Zuculini	6	0	4	0	2	0
42	MF	(Portugal) POR	Miguel Veloso	22	0	20	0	2	0
43	FW	(Italy) ITA	Alberto Paloschi	12	2	12	2	0	0
71	MF	(Serbia) SRB	Boško Janković	7	0	6	0	1	0
73	GK	(Italy) ITA	Alessio Scarpi	3	-5	0	0	3	-5
77	MF	(Italy) ITA	Omar Milanetto	31	2	30	2	1	0
83	FW	(Italy) ITA	Antonio Floro Flores	17	8	17	8	0	0

== Competitions ==
=== Serie A ===
Genoa C.F.C finished the season in tenth place on the league table, with 14 wins, 15 losses and 9 draws.

==== League table ====
Pos	Team	Pld	W	D	L	GF	GA	GD	Pts	Qualification or relegation
8	Palermo	38	17	5	16	58	63	−5	56	Qualification to Europa League third qualifying round (Note: As Internazionale won the 2010–11 Coppa Italia and already qualified for the Champions League, Palermo entered the 2011–12 UEFA Europa League third qualification round as the cup runners-up.)
9	Fiorentina	38	12	15	11	49	44	+5	51 (Note: Fiorentina finished ahead of Genoa on head-to-head points: Fiorentina 1–0 Genoa, Genoa 1–1 Fiorentina.)	
10	Genoa	38	14	9	15	45	47	−2	51	
11	ChievoVerona	38	11	13	14	38	40	−2	46 (Note: Chievo finished ahead of Parma and Catania on head-to-head points: Chievo: 6 pts, Parma: 5 pts, Catania: 4 pts.)	
12	Parma	38	11	13	14	39	47	−8	46	

Source: Lega Serie A
Rules for classification: 1) points; 2) head-to-head points; 3) head-to-head goal difference; 4) head-to-head goals scored; 5) goal difference; 6) number of goals scored.

=== Coppa Italia ===
20 October 2010 Third round	Genoa	2–1 (a.e.t.)	Grosseto	Stadio Luigi Ferraris, Genoa
18:00 CEST	Toni 81', 119'	Report	52' Freddi	Referee: Peruzzo (Italy)

24 November 2010 Fourth round	Genoa	3–1 (a.e.t.)	Vicenza	Stadio Luigi Ferraris, Genoa
20:30 CET	Toni 87' (pen.), 92'; Destro 97'	Report	63' Salifu	Referee: Gervasoni (Italy)

12 January 2011 Round of 16	Internazionale	3–2	Genoa	San Siro, Milan
21:00 CET	Eto'o 15' 43'; Mariga 59'	Report	Kharja 54' (pen.); Sculli 90+1'	Attendance: 15,254; Referee: Nicola Pierpaoli
