= Massimo Oddo =

Italian footballer and manager (born 1976)

- Oddo in 2019

Personal information
- Full name: Massimo Oddo
- Date of birth: 14 June 1976 (age 50)
- Place of birth: Città Sant'Angelo, Italy
- Height: 1.82 m (6 ft 0 in)
- Position: Right-back

Youth career
- 1992–1993: Renato Curi Angolana
- 1993–1995: AC Milan

Senior career*
Years	Team	Apps	(Gls)
1992–1993	Renato Curi Angolana	3	(0)
1993–1999	AC Milan	0	(0)
1995–1996	→ Fiorenzuola (loan)	19	(0)
1996	→ Monza (loan)	4	(0)
1996–1997	→ Prato (loan)	16	(0)
1997–1998	→ Lecco (loan)	20	(1)
1998–1999	→ Monza (loan)	30	(4)
1999–2000	Napoli	36	(1)
2000–2002	Verona	64	(10)
2002–2007	Lazio	135	(17)
2007–2012	AC Milan	56	(2)
2008–2009	→ Bayern Munich (loan)	18	(0)
2011–2012	→ Lecce (loan)	27	(1)
Total		428	(36)

International career
2002–2008	Italy	34	(1)

Managerial career
- 2015–2017: Pescara
- 2017–2018: Udinese
- 2018: Crotone
- 2019–2020: Perugia
- 2020: Perugia
- 2020: Pescara
- 2022: Padova
- 2023: SPAL
- 2024: Padova
- 2025–2026: Milan Futuro
Medal record
Men's football
Representing Italy
FIFA World Cup
Winner	2006 Germany
- * Club domestic league appearances and goals

Massimo Oddo Ufficiale OMRI (Italian: [ˈmassimo ˈɔddo]; born 14 June 1976) is an Italian professional football manager and a former player who most recently was the head coach of Milan Futuro, AC Milan's reserve team. As a player, he played as a right-back.

Oddo played for several Italian clubs throughout his career, although he is mainly remembered for his time with Lazio, where he won the Coppa Italia, and in particular, AC Milan, where he won several titles, including the UEFA Champions League and the Scudetto; he also had a spell on loan with German club Bayern Munich. At the international level, he represented the Italian squad at UEFA Euro 2004 and was also part of the team that won the 2006 FIFA World Cup.

== Club career ==
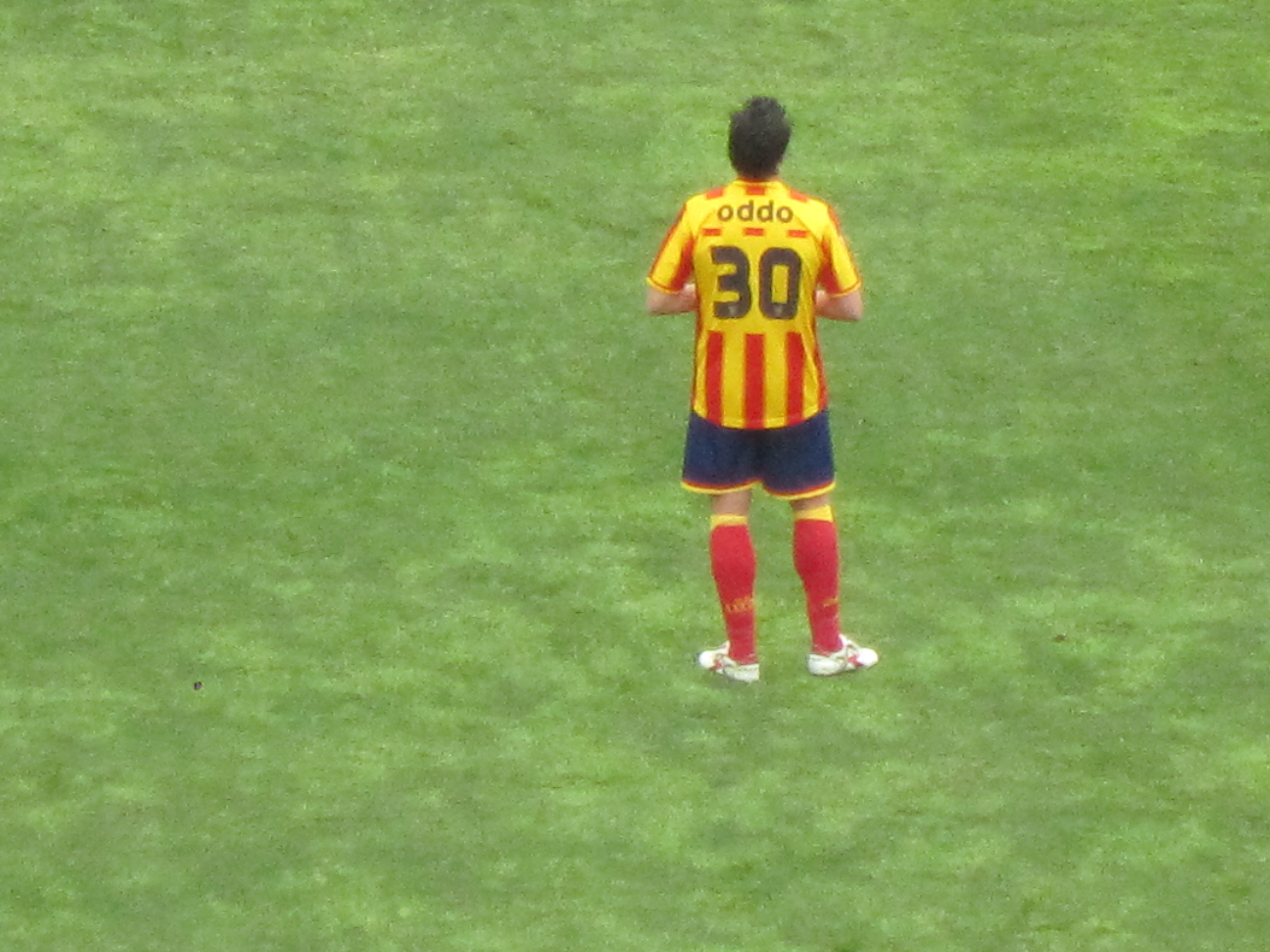
Oddo playing for Lecce in 2012

Oddo started his career at Renato Curi Angolana of Serie D and moved to AC Milan youth team in 1993. After spending two years on the bench, in the hope of more playing opportunities, he moved to Serie C team Fiorenzuola on loan. It was followed by other three Serie C groups (Monza, Prato, Lecco). He returned to promoted Serie B team Monza in 1998 and left a year later for Napoli (in a co-ownership deal). He helped Napoli win promotion to Serie A after a successful 1999–2000 Serie B and joined Hellas Verona that summer. While at Verona, Oddo completed his obligatory military service. He would spend Monday through Thursday at the military barracks and then, on Fridays, would join up with his teammates for training.

After two successful seasons with Verona, Italian giants Lazio purchased him. At Lazio, he had the opportunity to play in the UEFA Champions League in the season 2003–04 and the UEFA Cup competition in the 2002–03 and 2004–05 seasons. The team reached the semi-finals in 2003. Moreover, his third season with Lazio earned him the Coppa Italia winner title. He became the captain of Lazio for the first half of the 2006–07 season, following the departure of Fabio Liverani to Fiorentina.

On 23 January 2007, it was announced that Milan and Lazio had reached an accord for Oddo's transfer to the Rossoneri after a long negotiation period. The overall price was €10.75 million (cash plus Pasquale Foggia, who had been on loan at the club since the start of the season) and Oddo waived some of his wage, made the deal worth €12 million in total. He signed a contract until 30 June 2011. Months later, Oddo was the starting right back in the 2007 UEFA Champions League final and helped Milan gain their seventh European Cup in a 2–1 win over Liverpool, as well as the club's fifth UEFA Super Cup in August when they had to face 2007 UEFA Cup winners, Sevilla.

With the arrival of Gianluca Zambrotta, Oddo had to compete with him in the right-back position. On 28 August 2008, Oddo moved to Bayern Munich on a one-year loan with the option of making the move permanent; however, at the end of the 2008–09 season, the German club confirmed that it would not take that option, and he returned to Milan, with Zambrotta moved to left-back and Oddo found himself competing with Ignazio Abate for the right-back position.

On 21 July 2010, he extended his contract until 30 June 2012. A day after, Zambrotta also signed a new deal.

After being mostly frozen out of the Milan squad during the starting part of the 2010–11 season, he made his season debut against former club Napoli after an early first-half head injury to left back Luca Antonini; furthermore, he provided two assists, one to Robinho for the opening goal and another for Zlatan Ibrahimović.

On 31 August 2011, Oddo joined Lecce on a season-long loan.

Following the 2011–12 season, Oddo ended his career, saying: "I leave football. When you reach a certain age, you face a crossroads."

== International career ==
Oddo made his national debut on 21 August 2002, in a 1–0 home defeat to Slovenia, replacing Matteo Brighi during the second half, as part of a reformed squad after the unsuccessful 2002 FIFA World Cup performance of the Azzurri, under Giovanni Trapattoni.

He was a starter at seven Euro 2004 qualifying matches. During the main competition in Portugal, he made one appearance, playing as a substitute in Italy's final group game against Bulgaria (22 June 2004); during the match, he supplied an assist for Cassano's goal, which helped Italy win the match 2–1, although they were eliminated from the tournament in the first round on direct encounters, following a three-way five-point tie with Denmark and Sweden. Subsequently, Oddo was a member of Italy's championship-winning squad during the 2006 FIFA World Cup under Marcello Lippi, as back up to Gianluca Zambrotta, making one substitute appearance in Italy's 3–0 win over Ukraine in the quarter-finals of the tournament. At the end of 2006 FIFA World Cup final match in Germany, in which Italy defeated France 5–3 in a penalty shoot-out, Oddo chopped off a large chunk of his teammate Mauro Camoranesi's long hair as the rest of the squad danced around them in a circle.

Oddo scored his first and only international goal for Italy from the penalty spot in a Euro 2008 qualifying match on 7 October 2006 against Ukraine, under manager Roberto Donadoni, which ended in a 2–0 victory for the Italians. Oddo made his 34th and final appearance for Italy in a 3–1 win over Portugal on 6 February 2008.

== Style of play ==
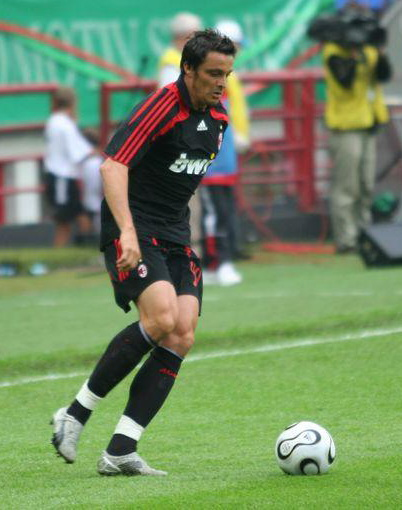
Oddo playing for AC Milan in 2007

Oddo was primarily deployed on the right flank as an offensive full-back or wing-back, or even as a wide-midfielder on occasion, due to his stamina, work-rate, defensive consistency, attacking drive, and crossing ability. In his later career, he was deployed in a more defensive role as a central-defender. Despite being a defender, Oddo was known for his ability on set pieces and penalties.

== Coaching career ==
After retirement, Oddo pursued a coaching career, accepting an offer as youth coach of the Allievi Regionali B for Genoa in August 2013. He left his job in July 2014 to accept an offer to guide the Primavera (under-19) squad of his hometown club Pescara.

On 23 May 2015, he was promoted as head coach of Pescara after the dismissal of Marco Baroni with only one game remaining, a home match against Livorno (coached by former Italy teammate Christian Panucci), with both teams still involved in the race for a promotion playoff spot. The game ended with a 3–0 win for Pescara, which qualified the team to the Serie A promotion playoffs. On 9 June 2016, Oddo led Pescara to Serie A promotion after beating out Trapani 3–1 on aggregate in the Serie B promotion play-off final. On 15 July 2016, Pescara extended Oddo's contract by three years, keeping him as manager of the club until June 2019. He was sacked on 14 February 2017.

On 21 November 2017, Oddo was named the head coach of Udinese following the sacking of Luigi Delneri. He was sacked on 24 April 2018, with Udinese in 15th place, as they lost 11 matches in a row.

On 29 October 2018, Serie B club Crotone announced the hiring of Oddo. However, he failed to change the fortunes of the club, failing to win a single game before resigning on 28 December following a 0–3 home defeat to Spezia.

On 7 June 2019, Oddo was appointed head coach of Perugia. He was dismissed by Perugia on 4 January 2020. He was rehired again on 19 July, and terminated on 19 August 2020.

On 29 August 2020, Oddo was appointed manager of Pescara. On 29 November 2020, Pescara fired him after only gaining four points in the first nine league games.

On 24 February 2022, he returned to management as the new head coach of Serie C promotion hopefuls Padova. Under his tenure, he guided Padova to win the 2021–22 Coppa Italia Serie C title, but failed automatic promotion by ending in second place behind Südtirol. He led Padova to a second consecutive promotion playoff final, where they were defeated by Palermo in a 0–2 aggregate loss. Due to failure to achieve promotion to Serie B, Oddo and Padova parted ways by mutual consent at the end of the season.

On 14 February 2023, Oddo was named head coach of Serie B relegation-struggling club SPAL, replacing Daniele De Rossi. He left the club at the end of the season as SPAL was relegated to Serie C.

On 8 April 2024, Oddo returned to Padova, replacing Vincenzo Torrente in charge of the Serie C team in time for the promotion playoffs and agreeing on a contract until 30 June 2024 with an option to extend. He left the club by the end of the season, after being eliminated in the playoffs to Vicenza.

On 25 February 2025, Oddo was appointed as head coach of Milan Futuro, AC Milan's reserve team. On 30 June 2026, the club announced his departure as the head coach ahead of the 2026–27 season.

== Personal life ==
Oddo is from the town of Pescara on the Adriatic coast but has Sicilian origins.

Oddo's father, Francesco, is a football manager and former player. After leaving school, Oddo attended university to study law but left without graduating. He returned to university in 2007 but undertook a course in sports management.

He has three children: Davide, Francesco and Greta. Oddo is a trained barber and styled a lot of his Italy colleagues' hair at the World Cup 2006, earning him the nickname the Barber of Berlin.

== Career statistics ==
=== Club ===
Appearances and goals by club, season and competition
Club	Season	League			National cup (Note: Includes Coppa Italia, DFB-Pokal)		Continental		Other		Total	
Club	Season	Division	Apps	Goals	Apps	Goals	Apps	Goals	Apps	Goals	Apps	Goals
Renato Curi	1992–93	Eccellenza	3	0	—		—		—		3	0
AC Milan	1993–94	Serie A	—		—		—		—		—	
AC Milan	1994–95	Serie A	—		—		—		—		—	
AC Milan	Total		0	0	0	0	0	0	0	0	0	0
Fiorenzuola (loan)	1995–96	Serie C1	19	0	3	0	—		—		22	0
Monza (loan)	1996–97	Serie C1	4	0	2	0	—		—		6	0
Prato (loan)	1996–97	Serie C1	16	0	—		—		—		16	0
Lecco (loan)	1997–98	Serie C1	20	1	—		—		—		20	1
Monza (loan)	1998–99	Serie B	30	4	1	0	—		—		31	4
Napoli	1999–2000	Serie B	36	1	9	0	—		—		45	1
Verona	2000–01	Serie A	32	4	2	0	—		—		34	4
Verona	2001–02	Serie A	32	6	1	2	—		—		33	8
Verona	Total		64	10	3	2	0	0	0	0	67	12
Lazio	2002–03	Serie A	19	0	5	0	7 (Note: Appearances in UEFA Cup)	0	—		31	0
Lazio	2003–04	Serie A	31	1	7	0	6 (Note: Appearances in UEFA Champions League)	0	—		44	1
Lazio	2004–05	Serie A	35	4	1	0	5	0	1 (Note: Appearance in Supercoppa Italiana)	0	42	4
Lazio	2005–06	Serie A	35	7	3	0	—		—		38	7
Lazio	2006–07	Serie A	15	5	2	0	—		—		17	5
Lazio	Total		135	17	18	0	18	0	1	0	172	17
AC Milan	2006–07	Serie A	10	1	—		7	0	—		17	1
AC Milan	2007–08	Serie A	25	1	1	0	6	0	2 (Note: One appearance in UEFA Super Cup, one appearance in FIFA Club World Cup)	0	34	1
AC Milan	2009–10	Serie A	14	0	—		4	0	—		18	0
AC Milan	2010–11	Serie A	7	0	3	0	—		—		10	0
AC Milan	Total		56	2	4	0	17	0	2	0	79	2
Bayern Munich (loan)	2008–09	Bundesliga	18	0	2	0	7	0	—		27	0
Lecce (loan)	2011–12	Serie A	27	1	—		—		—		27	1
Career total			428	36	42	2	42	0	3	0	515	38

=== International ===
Appearances and goals by national team and year
National team	Year	Apps	Goals
Italy	2002	2	0
Italy	2003	7	0
Italy	2004	7	0
Italy	2005	2	0
Italy	2006	7	1
Italy	2007	8	0
Italy	2008	1	0
Total		34	1

#	Date	Venue	Opponent	Score	Result	Competition
1	7 October 2006	Stadio Olimpico, Rome, Italy	Ukraine	1–0	2–0	UEFA Euro 2008 qualifying

== Managerial statistics ==
As of match played 10 May 2026

Managerial record by team and tenure
Team	From	To	Record							
Team	From	To	G	W	D	L	GF	GA	GD	Win %
Pescara	16 May 2015	14 February 2017	80	30	19	31	114	121	−7	37.50
Udinese	21 November 2017	24 April 2018	24	7	3	14	33	37	−4	29.17
Crotone	1 November 2018	28 December 2018	8	0	2	6	3	15	−12	0.00
Perugia	7 June 2019	4 January 2020	22	10	6	6	29	27	+2	45.45
Perugia	19 July 2020	19 August 2020	5	2	0	3	7	8	−1	40.00
Pescara	29 August 2020	29 November 2020	11	1	2	8	8	23	−15	9.09
Padova	24 February 2022	23 June 2022	18	11	3	4	18	10	+8	61.11
SPAL	14 February 2023	30 June 2023	14	3	5	6	13	19	−6	21.43
Padova	8 April 2024	14 June 2024	5	2	1	2	5	6	−1	40.00
Milan Futuro	25 February 2025	30 June 2026	50	22	11	17	81	57	+24	44.00
Total			237	88	52	97	311	323	−12	37.13

== Honours ==
=== As a player ===
Lazio

- Coppa Italia: 2003–04

Milan

- Serie A: 2010–11
- Supercoppa Italiana: 2011
- UEFA Champions League 2006–07
- UEFA Super Cup: 2007
- FIFA Club World Cup: 2007

Italy

- FIFA World Cup: 2006

=== As a manager ===
Padova

- Coppa Italia Serie C: 2021–22

=== Orders ===
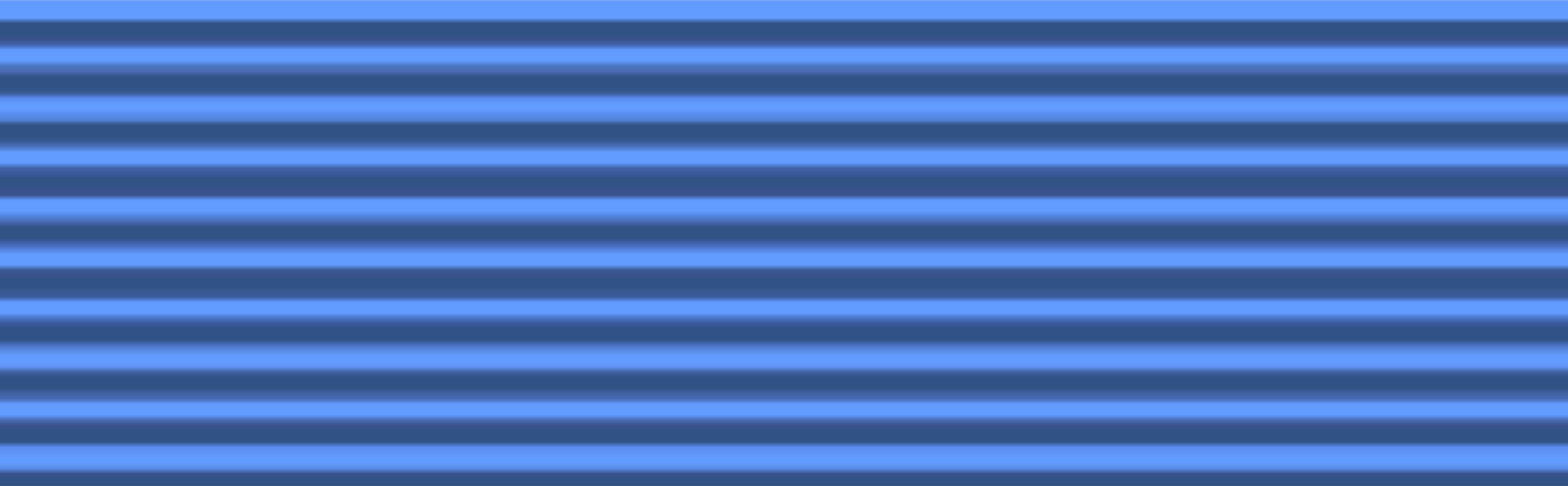

CONI: Golden Collar of Sports Merit: Collare d'Oro al Merito Sportivo: 2006

4th Class / Officer: Ufficiale Ordine al Merito della Repubblica Italiana: 2006
