= 2009–10 Genoa CFC season =

Genoa
2009–10 season
- Chairman: Enrico Preziosi
- Manager: Gian Piero Gasperini
- Serie A: 9th
- Coppa Italia: Round of 16
- Europa League: Group stage
- Top goalscorer: League: Rodrigo Palacio (7); All: Rodrigo Palacio (8)
Home colours	Away colours	Third colours

Genoa had a mixed season, in which it struggled to replace world-class striker Diego Milito, who moved on to Internazionale, where he was key in winning the treble in 2010. Such a player was difficult to find, and his Argentinian replacements Hernán Crespo and Rodrigo Palacio lacked the final punch. Crespo had it in his younger years, of course, but despite four goals in the autumn, he was offloaded to Parma, as Genoa put its faith in David Suazo for the goalscoring. Sergio Floccari also departed, and the Lazio signing scored more goals for the Roman club in half the year than what any player did for Genoa the whole season, while Suazo became a flop. The defence did not perform at expected level either, and even though the team scored several goals by many players, the defensive holes ensured the team did not repeat the fifth position from the year before.

== Squad ==
=== Goalkeepers ===
- (Italy) Alberto Frison
- (Italy) Marco Amelia
- (Italy) Alessio Scarpi

=== Defenders ===
- (Italy) Giuseppe Biava
- (Italy) Dario Dainelli
- (Italy) Domenico Criscito
- (Montenegro) Ivan Fatić
- (Greece) Sokratis Papastathopoulos
- (Italy) Emiliano Moretti
- (Italy) Salvatore Bocchetti
- (Serbia) Nenad Tomović
- (Italy) Andrea Esposito

=== Midfielders ===
- (Morocco) Houssine Kharja
- (Italy) Marco Rossi
- (Italy) Giandomenico Mesto
- (Spain) Alberto Zapater
- (Austria) Robert Gucher
- (Croatia) Ivan Jurić
- (Italy) Omar Milanetto
- (Italy) Silvano Raggio Garibaldi
- (Italy) Francesco Modesto
- (Italy) Matteo Paro

=== Forwards ===
- (Argentina) Rodrigo Palacio
- (Italy) Robert Acquafresca
- (Italy) Raffaele Palladino
- (Italy) Stephan El Shaarawy
- (Italy) Giuseppe Sculli
- (Serbia) Boško Janković
- (Honduras) David Suazo
- (Italy) Sergio Floccari
- (Argentina) Hernán Crespo
- (Argentina) Luciano Figueroa
- (Ghana) Richmond Boakye

== Serie A ==
=== League table ===
Pos	Team	Pld	W	D	L	GF	GA	GD	Pts	Qualification or relegation
7	Juventus	38	16	7	15	55	56	−1	55	Qualification to Europa League third qualifying round
8	Parma	38	14	10	14	46	51	−5	52	
9	Genoa	38	14	9	15	57	61	−4	51	
10	Bari	38	13	11	14	49	49	0	50	
11	Fiorentina	38	13	8	17	48	47	+1	47	

Source: Lega Calcio and Yahoo! Sport
Rules for classification: 1) points; 2) head-to-head points; 3) head-to-head goal difference; 4) head-to-head goals scored; 5) goal difference; 6) number of goals scored.

=== Matches ===
- Genoa-Roma 3–2
- 1–0 Domenico Criscito (49)
- 1–1 Rodrigo Taddei (54)
- 1–2 Francesco Totti (64)
- 2–2 Alberto Zapater (69)
- 3–2 Giuseppe Biava (83)
- Atalanta-Genoa 0–1
- 0–1 Emiliano Moretti (45 + 1)
- Genoa-Napoli 4–1
- 0–1 Marek Hamšík (41)
- 1–1 Sergio Floccari (45 + 6 (pen.))
- 2–1 Giandomenico Mesto (55)
- 3–1 Hernán Crespo (75)
- 4–1 Houssine Kharja (88)
- Chievo-Genoa 3–1
- 1–0 Michele Marcolini (5 (pen.))
- 2–0 Erjon Bogdani (7)
- 2–1 Sergio Floccari (65 (pen.))
- 3–1 Sergio Pellissier (76)
- Genoa-Juventus 2–2
- 0–1 Vincenzo Iaquinta (6)
- 1–1 Giandomenico Mesto (31)
- 2–1 Hernán Crespo (75)
- 2–2 David Trezeguet (86)
- Udinese-Genoa 2–0
- 1–0 Antonio Di Natale (81)
- 2–0 Simone Pepe (88)
- Bologna-Genoa 1–3
- 0–1 Houssine Kharja (11 (pen.))
- 0–2 Giuseppe Sculli (35)
- 1–2 Marco Di Vaio (85 (pen.))
- 1–3 Alberto Zapater (90)
- Genoa-Internazionale 0–5
- 0–1 Esteban Cambiasso (6)
- 0–2 Mario Balotelli (31)
- 0–3 Dejan Stanković (45 + 4)
- 0–4 Patrick Vieira (66)
- 0–5 Maicon (71)
- Cagliari-Genoa 3–2
- 0–1 Giandomenico Mesto (20)
- 1–1 Davide Biondini (55)
- 1–2 Sergio Floccari (55)
- 2–2 Nenê (78 pen)
- 3–2 Andrea Lazzari (87)
- Genoa-Fiorentina 2–1
- 1–0 Raffaele Palladino (43)
- 1–1 Marco Marchionni (63)
- 2–1 Giandomenico Mesto (73)
- Palermo-Genoa 0–0
- Genoa-Siena 4–2
- 1–0 Hernán Crespo (2)
- 2–0 Hernán Crespo (17)
- 3–0 Raffaele Palladino (34)
- 3–1 Michele Paolucci (80)
- 3–2 Massimo Maccarone (82)
- 4–2 Sergio Floccari (90)
- Livorno-Genoa 2–1
- 1–0 Cristiano Lucarelli (21)
- 1–1 Domenico Criscito (62)
- 2–1 Nico Pulzetti (90 + 2)
- Genoa-Sampdoria 3–0
- 1–0 Omar Milanetto (10 (pen.))
- 2–0 Marco Rossi (53)
- 3–0 Raffaele Palladino (75)
- Genoa-Parma 2–2
- 1–0 Rodrigo Palacio (14)
- 1–1 Jonathan Biabiany (36)
- 1–2 Jonathan Biabiany (59)
- 2–2 Raffaele Palladino (67)
- Lazio-Genoa 1–0
- 1–0 Aleksandar Kolarov (39)
- Genoa-Bari 1–1
- 0–1 Barreto (4)
- 1–1 Omar Milanetto (52)
- Milan-Genoa 5–2
- 0–1 Giuseppe Sculli (25)
- 1–1 Ronaldinho (32 (pen.))
- 2–1 Thiago Silva (38)
- 3–1 Marco Borriello (48)
- 4–1 Marco Borriello (60)
- 5–1 Klaas-Jan Huntelaar (74 (pen.))
- 5–2 David Suazo (79)
- Genoa-Catania 2–0
- 1–0 Giandomenico Mesto (36)
- 2–0 Giuseppe Sculli (71)
- Roma-Genoa 3–0
- 1–0 Simone Perrotta (17)
- 2–0 Luca Toni (45)
- 3–0 Luca Toni (60)
- Genoa-Atalanta 2–0
- 1–0 Rodrigo Palacio (18)
- 2–0 Hernán Crespo (42)
- Napoli-Genoa 0–0
- Genoa-Chievo 1–0
- 1–0 Marco Rossi (63)
- Juventus-Genoa 3–2
- 0–1 Marco Rossi (16)
- 1–1 Amauri (42)
- 2–1 Alessandro Del Piero (61)
- 2–2 Marco Rossi (63)
- 3–2 Alessandro Del Piero (78 (pen.))
- Genoa-Udinese 3–0
- 1–0 Robert Acquafresca (30)
- 2–0 Robert Acquafresca (53 (pen.))
- 3–0 Rodrigo Palacio (64)
- Genoa-Bologna 3–4
- 1–0 David Suazo (8)
- 1–1 Antonio Buscè (11)
- 2–1 Giuseppe Sculli (18)
- 2–2 Adaílton (28)
- 3–2 David Suazo (38)
- 3–3 Adaílton (56)
- 3–4 Adaílton (79 (pen.))
- Internazionale-Genoa 0–0
- Genoa-Cagliari 5–3
- 0–1 Daniele Dessena (16)
- 1–1 Alberto Zapater (36 (pen.))
- 2–1 Rodrigo Palacio (39)
- 2–2 Daniele Conti (41)
- 3–2 Giuseppe Sculli (42)
- 4–2 Marco Rossi (45)
- 4–3 Alessandro Matri (55 (pen.))
- 5–3 Omar Milanetto (59)
- Fiorentina-Genoa 3–0
- 1–0 Mario Santana (4)
- 2–0 Alberto Gilardino (73 (pen.))
- 3–0 Khouma Babacar (86)
- Genoa-Palermo 2–2
- 0–1 Abel Hernández (35)
- 1–1 Salvatore Bocchetti (75)
- 1–2 Javier Pastore (78)
- 2–2 Houssine Kharja (90 + 8 (pen.))
- Siena-Genoa 0–0
- Genoa-Livorno 1–1
- 1–0 Richmond Boakye (51)
- 1–1 Francesco Tavano (88)
- Sampdoria-Genoa 1–0
- 1–0 Antonio Cassano (23)
- Parma-Genoa 2–3
- 0–1 Rodrigo Palacio (33)
- 0–2 Rodrigo Palacio (51)
- 1–2 Cristian Zaccardo (59)
- 2–2 Salvatore Bocchetti (62 (o.g.))
- 2–3 Ivan Fatić (72)
- Genoa-Lazio 1–2
- 1–0 Rodrigo Palacio (8)
- 1–1 André Dias (25)
- 1–2 Sergio Floccari (32)
- Bari-Genoa 3–0
- 1–0 Riccardo Meggiorini (57)
- 2–0 José Ignacio Castillo (85)
- 3–0 Barreto (89)
- Genoa-Milan 1–0
- 1–0 Giuseppe Sculli (57)
- Catania-Genoa 1–0
- 1–0 Maxi López (65)

=== Topscorers ===
- (Argentina) Rodrigo Palacio – 7
- (Italy) Marco Rossi – 5
- (Argentina) Hernán Crespo – 5
- (Italy) Raffaele Palladino – 4
- (Italy) Sergio Floccari – 4

== UEFA Europa League ==
=== Play-off round ===
20 August 2009 First leg	Genoa (Italy)	3–1	(Denmark) Odense	Genoa, Italy
20:45 CEST (UTC+2)	Sørensen 9' (o.g.); Biava (yellow card) 17'; Bocchetti (yellow card) 45'; Figueroa 48', 56'	Report	Helveg (yellow card) 12'; Christensen (yellow card) 55'; Mesto 59' (o.g.); Sørensen (yellow card) 64'; Utaka (yellow card) 85'; Djemba-Djemba (yellow card) 90+2'	Stadium: Stadio Luigi Ferraris; Attendance: 21,889; Referee: Stéphane Lannoy (France)

27 August 2009 Second leg	Odense (Denmark)	1–1 (2–4 agg.)	(Italy) Genoa	Odense, Denmark
20:30 CEST (UTC+2)	Djemba-Djemba (yellow card) 11'; Cacá (yellow card) 39'; Figueroa 45+2' (o.g.)	Report	Biava (yellow card) 45+3'; Criscito 53'; Papastathopoulos (yellow card) 77'	Stadium: Fionia Park; Attendance: 10,001; Referee: Björn Kuipers (Netherlands)
Note: Genoa won 4–2 on aggregate.

==== Group stage ====
Pos	Team	Pld	W	D	L	GF	GA	GD	Pts	Qualification	VAL	LIL	GEN	SLV
1	(Spain) Valencia	6	3	3	0	12	8	+4	12	Advance to knockout phase	—	3–1	3–2	1–1
2	(France) Lille	6	3	1	2	15	9	+6	10	Advance to knockout phase	1–1	—	3–0	3–1
3	(Italy) Genoa	6	2	1	3	8	10	−2	7		1–2	3–2	—	2–0
4	(Czech Republic) Slavia Prague	6	0	3	3	5	13	−8	3		2–2	1–5	0–0	—

Source: Soccerway

17 September 2009 1	Genoa (Italy)	2–0	(Czech Republic) Slavia Prague	Genoa, Italy
19:00 CEST (UTC+2)	Zapater 4'; Sculli 39'	Report		Stadium: Stadio Luigi Ferraris; Attendance: 17,356; Referee: Jorge Sousa (Portugal)

1 October 2009 2	Valencia (Spain)	3–2	(Italy) Genoa	Valencia, Spain
21:05 CEST (UTC+2)	Silva 52', (yellow card) 86'; Žigić 56'; Mathieu (yellow card) 63'; Villa 82' (pen.); Banega (yellow card) 90'	Report	Floccari 43'; Kharja 64' (pen.); Moretti (yellow card) 72'; Mesto (yellow card) 74'; Esposito (yellow card) 81'	Stadium: Mestalla; Attendance: 21,333; Referee: Cüneyt Çakır (Turkey)

22 October 2009 3	Lille (France)	3–0	(Italy) Genoa	Villeneuve d'Ascq, France
21:05 CEST (UTC+2)	Cabaye (yellow card) 23'; Obraniak 38', (yellow card) 71'; Vittek 63'; Hazard 84', (yellow card) 85'	Report	Bocchetti (yellow card) 27'; Mesto (yellow card) 35'; Esposito (yellow card) 40'; Palacio (yellow card) 71'	Stadium: Stadium Lille-Metropole; Attendance: 16,518; Referee: Darko Čeferin (Slovenia)

5 November 2009 4	Genoa (Italy)	3–2	(France) Lille	Genoa, Italy
19:00 CET (UTC+1)	Palacio 14'; Moretti (yellow card) 36'; Zapater (yellow card) 43'; Crespo 58'; Sculli 90+3', (yellow card) 90+3'	Report	Béria (yellow card) 56'; Vandam (yellow card) 64'; Frau 76'; Gervinho 84'; Landreau (yellow card) 90+3'	Stadium: Stadio Luigi Ferraris; Attendance: 18,587; Referee: Bas Nijhuis (Netherlands)

2 December 2009 5	Slavia Prague (Czech Republic)	0–0	(Italy) Genoa	Prague, Czech Republic
21:05 CET (UTC+1)		Report	Palladino (yellow card) 87'	Stadium: Synot Tip Arena; Attendance: 11,799; Referee: Knut Kircher (Germany)

17 December 2009 6	Genoa (Italy)	1–2	(Spain) Valencia	Genoa, Italy
19:00 CET (UTC+1)	Jurić (yellow card) 25'; Sculli (yellow card) 42'; Crespo 51'; Bocchetti (yellow card) 85'	Report	Villa (yellow card) 20', (penalty missed) 85', 90+5'; Bruno (yellow card) 33', (goal) 45+1'; Banega (yellow card) 70'; Moyá (yellow card) 74'; Albelda (yellow card) 86'	Stadium: Stadio Luigi Ferraris; Attendance: 23,480; Referee: Alan Kelly (Republic of Ireland)
