= Andrea Esposito =

Italian footballer (born 1986)

Personal information
- Date of birth: 17 May 1986 (age 40)
- Place of birth: Galatina, Italy
- Height: 1.91 m (6 ft 3 in)
- Position: Defender

Youth career
- 2003: Lecce

Senior career*
Years	Team	Apps	(Gls)
2004–2009	Lecce	41	(2)
2006–2007	→ Sambenedettese (loan)	22	(0)
2009–2012	Genoa	5	(0)
2010	→ Livorno (loan)	3	(0)
2010–2011	→ Bologna (loan)	11	(0)
2011–2012	→ Lecce (loan)	7	(0)
2012–2013	Lecce	46	(2)
2013–2016	Latina	64	(1)
2016–2017	Vicenza	35	(1)
2017–2018	Cesena	26	(0)
2018–2020	Catania	36	(2)
2020–2023	Latina	80	(3)

International career
2002	Italy U17	1	(0)
2005	Italy U19	2	(0)
2005–2006	Italy U20	3	(0)
- * Club domestic league appearances and goals

Andrea Esposito (born 17 May 1986) is an Italian former footballer who played as a defender.

== Club career ==
As a young boy, Esposito started his career in the local Lecce Primavera youth squad before being sent to Sambenedettese on loan for the 2006–07 season. He also played five Serie A games before he left on loan, the first of which was on 25 January 2004, against Lazio.

After returning to the Lecce side in 2007, he scored his first professional goal in a 3–2 win over Rimini and helped the club win promotion from Serie B. In the following season in Serie A he scored a goal in a 1–1 home draw against A.C. Milan and impressed enough to force his way into the senior Italy squad at the end of the 2008–09 Serie A season.

In July 2009, he was signed by Genoa in co-ownership deal. On 19 January 2010 Livorno signed the defender on loan from Genoa until June 2010.

He rejoined Lecce for the 2012–13 Lega Pro Prima Divisione season after the club's relegation from Serie A in 2011–12 and subsequent expulsion from the Serie B for their part in the Calcio Scommesse scandal.

On 4 September 2018, following the bankruptcy of Cesena, he signed with the Serie C club Catania.

== International career ==
Esposito has represented Italy at Under-17 level. Despite being uncapped for the Under-21 side, he was named in Pierluigi Casiraghi's preliminary squad for the 2009 Under-21 European Championships but did not make the final 23.

He was called up to the senior Italy squad for the first time in June 2009 and was an unused substitute for the friendly against Northern Ireland.

== Career statistics ==
As of match played 24 April 2022

Appearances and goals by club, season and competition
Club	Season	League			National Cup		Continental		Other		Total	
Club	Season	Division	Apps	Goals	Apps	Goals	Apps	Goals	Apps	Goals	Apps	Goals
Lecce	2003–04	Serie A	1	0	0	0	—		—		1	0
Lecce	2004–05	Serie A	1	0	0	0	—		—		1	0
Lecce	2005–06	Serie A	3	0	0	0	—		—		3	0
Lecce	2007–08	Serie B	14	1	0	0	—		2 (Note: Appearance(s) in Promotion Playoffs)	0	16	1
Lecce	2008–09	Serie A	28	1	0	0	—		—		28	1
Lecce	Total		41	2	0	0	0	0	2	0	49	2
Sambenedettese (loan)	2006–07	Serie C1	22	0	0	0	—		—		22	0
Genoa	2009–10	Serie A	5	0	1	0	2 (Note: Appearance(s) in UEFA Europa League)	0	—		8	0
Livorno (loan)	2009–10	Serie A	3	0	0	0	—		—		3	0
Bologna (loan)	2010–11	Serie A	11	0	2	0	—		—		13	0
Lecce (loan)	2011–12	Serie A	27	1	0	0	—		—		27	1
Lecce	2012–13	Lega Pro	24	1	2	0	—		3	0	29	1
Lecce	Total		51	2	2	0	0	0	3	0	56	2
Latina	2013–14	Serie B	36	0	1	0	—		3	0	40	0
Latina	2014–15	Serie B	5	0	1	0	—		—		6	0
Latina	2015–16	Serie B	23	1	1	0	—		—		24	1
Latina	2016–17	Serie B	0	0	1	0	—		—		1	0
Latina	Total		64	1	4	0	0	0	3	0	71	1
Vicenza	2016–17	Serie B	35	1	0	0	—		—		35	1
Cesena	2017–18	Serie B	26	0	1	0	—		—		27	0
Catania	2018–19	Serie C	19	1	1	0	—		3	0	23	1
Catania	2019–20	Serie C	17	1	2	0	—		—		19	1
Catania	Total		36	2	3	0	0	0	3	0	42	2
Latina	2020–21	Serie D	25	2	—		—		2	0	27	2
Latina	2021–22	Serie C	29	1	—		—		—		29	1
Latina	Total		54	3	0	0	0	0	2	0	56	3
Career total			354	11	13	0	2	0	13	0	382	11
