= Davide Petrachi =

Italian footballer (born 1986)

Personal information
- Date of birth: 14 August 1986 (age 40)
- Place of birth: Lecce, Italy
- Height: 1.84 m (6 ft 0 in)
- Position: Goalkeeper

Youth career
- Lecce

Senior career*
Years	Team	Apps	(Gls)
2006–2015	Lecce	5	(0)
2007–2008	→ Melfi (loan)	23	(0)
2015–2018	Lanciano	0	(0)
- * Club domestic league appearances and goals

Davide Petrachi (born 14 August 1986) is an Italian former footballer who played as a goalkeeper.

== Career ==
Petrachi grew out of the Lecce youth system, winning the scudetto in 2005 with Lecce reserve squad, as the second keeper. He measures 184 cm, weighing 75 kg.

On 27 August 2014 Petrachi signed a new 1-year contract with U.S. Lecce. However, on 21 January 2015 he was released. on 11 February 2015 he was signed by Lanciano, after the injury of Nícolas. Petrachi picked no.22 shirt for his new team.

He won the "Saracinesca d'oro" award as the best youth goalkeeper.

== Legal issues ==
In June 2018 he has been accused of drug trade. On 6 November he reached an agreement for a plea bargain: he has been jailed for 1 year and 4 months, and he also has been fined of €1.400 .
