= 2007–08 US Lecce season =

Lecce
2007–08 season
- President: Giovanni Semeraro
- Head coach: Giuseppe Papadopulo
- Stadium: Stadio Via del Mare
- Serie B: 3rd (promoted via play-offs)
- Coppa Italia: Round of 16
- Top goalscorer: League: Simone Tiribocchi (17); All: Simone Tiribocchi (17)
Home colours	Away colours	Third colours

The 2007–08 season was U.S. Lecce's second consecutive season in second division of the Italian football league, the Serie B, and the 81st as a football club.

== Competitions ==
=== Overall record ===
Competition	First match	Last match	Starting round	Final position	Record							
Competition	First match	Last match	Starting round	Final position	Pld	W	D	L	GF	GA	GD	Win %
Serie B	25 August 2007	1 June 2008	Matchday 1	3rd	42	23	14	5	70	29	+41	54.76
Coppa Italia	14 August 2007		First round	First round	1	0	1	0	2	2	+0	0.00
Total					43	23	15	5	72	31	+41	53.49

Source: Competitions

=== Serie A ===
==== League table ====
Pos	Team	Pld	W	D	L	GF	GA	GD	Pts	Promotion or relegation
1	Chievo (C, P)	42	24	13	5	77	43	+34	85	Promotion to Serie A
2	Bologna (P)	42	24	12	6	58	29	+29	84	Promotion to Serie A
3	Lecce (O, P)	42	23	14	5	70	29	+41	83	Qualification to promotion play-offs
4	AlbinoLeffe	42	23	9	10	67	48	+19	78	Qualification to promotion play-offs
5	Brescia	42	20	12	10	59	40	+19	72	Qualification to promotion play-offs

Source: Panini
Rules for classification: 1) points; 2) head-to-head points; 3) head-to-head goal difference; 4) head-to-head goals scored; 5) goal difference; 6) number of goals scored.
(C) Champions; (O) Play-off winners; (P) Promoted

==== Results summary ====
Overall								Home						Away					
Pld	W	D	L	GF	GA	GD	Pts	W	D	L	GF	GA	GD	W	D	L	GF	GA	GD
42	23	14	5	70	29	+41	83	12	7	2	34	11	+23	11	7	3	36	18	+18

Source: TheSports.org

==== Results by round ====
Round	1	2	3	4	5	6	7	8	9	10	11	12	13	14	15	16	17	18	19
Ground	A	H	A	H	A	A	H	A	H	H	A	H	A	H	A	H	A	H	A
Result	W	W	D	D	W	W	W	L	D	L	W	D	W	W	D	W	L	W	W
Position	5	3	7	6	4	4	3	4	4	7	6	6	6	4	5	4	5	3	2

Source: Serie B
A = Away; H = Home; W = Win; D = Draw; L = Loss
