= Guillermo Giacomazzi =

Uruguayan footballer (born 1977)

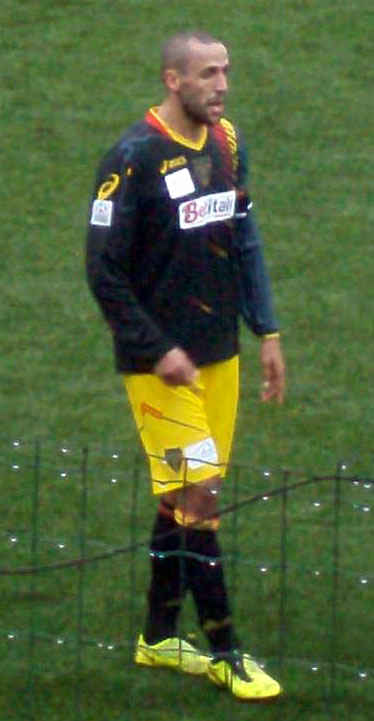
- Giacomazzi in 2013

Personal information
- Full name: Guillermo Gonzalo Giacomazzi Suárez
- Date of birth: 21 November 1977 (age 48)
- Place of birth: Montevideo, Uruguay
- Height: 1.87 m (6 ft 2 in)
- Position: Midfielder

Youth career
- 1997–1998: Bella Vista

Senior career*
| Years | Team | Apps | (Gls) |
| 1998–1999 | Bella Vista | 53 | (10) |
| 2000–2001 | Peñarol | 34 | (8) |
| 2001–2013 | Lecce | 273 | (37) |
| 2007 | → Palermo (loan) | 7 | (0) |
| 2007–2008 | → Empoli (loan) | 20 | (0) |
| 2013–2014 | Siena | 38 | (4) |
| 2014–2015 | Perugia | 26 | (1) |

International career
| 1998–2007 | Uruguay | 17 | (0) |
- * Club domestic league appearances and goals

Guillermo Gonzalo Giacomazzi Suárez (born 21 November 1977) is a Uruguayan football coach and former player. Giacomazzi represented Uruguay from 1998–2007. He holds the all-time Serie A appearance record for Lecce with 178 matches played.

== Playing career ==
Giacomazzi began his career in his native Uruguay with Bella Vista before moving to Peñarol. In 2001, he was signed by Italian club Lecce and made his Serie A debut on 27 August 2001, against Parma, a game which Lecce drew 1–1. He remained with the team for six years, during which he was appointed captain.

On 31 January 2007, he was signed by Palermo. On 11 February 2007, he played his first Serie A match for Palermo, against Empoli. In the following season, he was loaned to Empoli, and in 2008, he returned to Lecce. On 6 July 2010, he signed a new four-year contract with Lecce.

Giacomazzi stayed with Lecce in 2012 despite their relegation from Serie A in 2011–12 and subsequent expulsion from Serie B for their part in the Calcio Scommesse scandal. Giacomazzi, the club's captain, rejected offers from Serie A sides Parma and Torino and Serie B team Cesena to remain at the club.

In 2013, he joined Siena, a team that was excluded from Serie B at the end of the season due to financial problems. Thus, he became a free agent and joined Perugia for the 2014–15 Serie B season.

== Coaching career ==
On 15 February 2020, Giacomazzi was announced as one of the two assistants to head coach Devis Mangia in charge of the Malta national team. On 11 October 2022, he rescinded his contract with the Maltese Football Federation, and subsequently joined Serie B club SPAL as Daniele De Rossi's technical collaborator. He was relieved from his post, together with De Rossi and his entire staff, on 14 February 2023.

In January 2024, following De Rossi's appointment as new Roma head coach, Giacomazzi followed him as his assistant.

== Personal life ==
In addition to his native Uruguayan citizenship, Giacomazzi, who is of Italian descent, has been an Italian citizen since 2004. He is married to an Italian woman from Lecce, with whom he had two children.

His son Sebastián (born 2006) is a youth footballer for Lecce, and has been called up to join the Uruguay national under-20 football team in 2022.

In August 2022, Giacomazzi became a grandfather after his daughter Stephanie, partner of Lecce player Antonino Gallo, gave birth to a child.
