= Luca Di Matteo =

Italian footballer

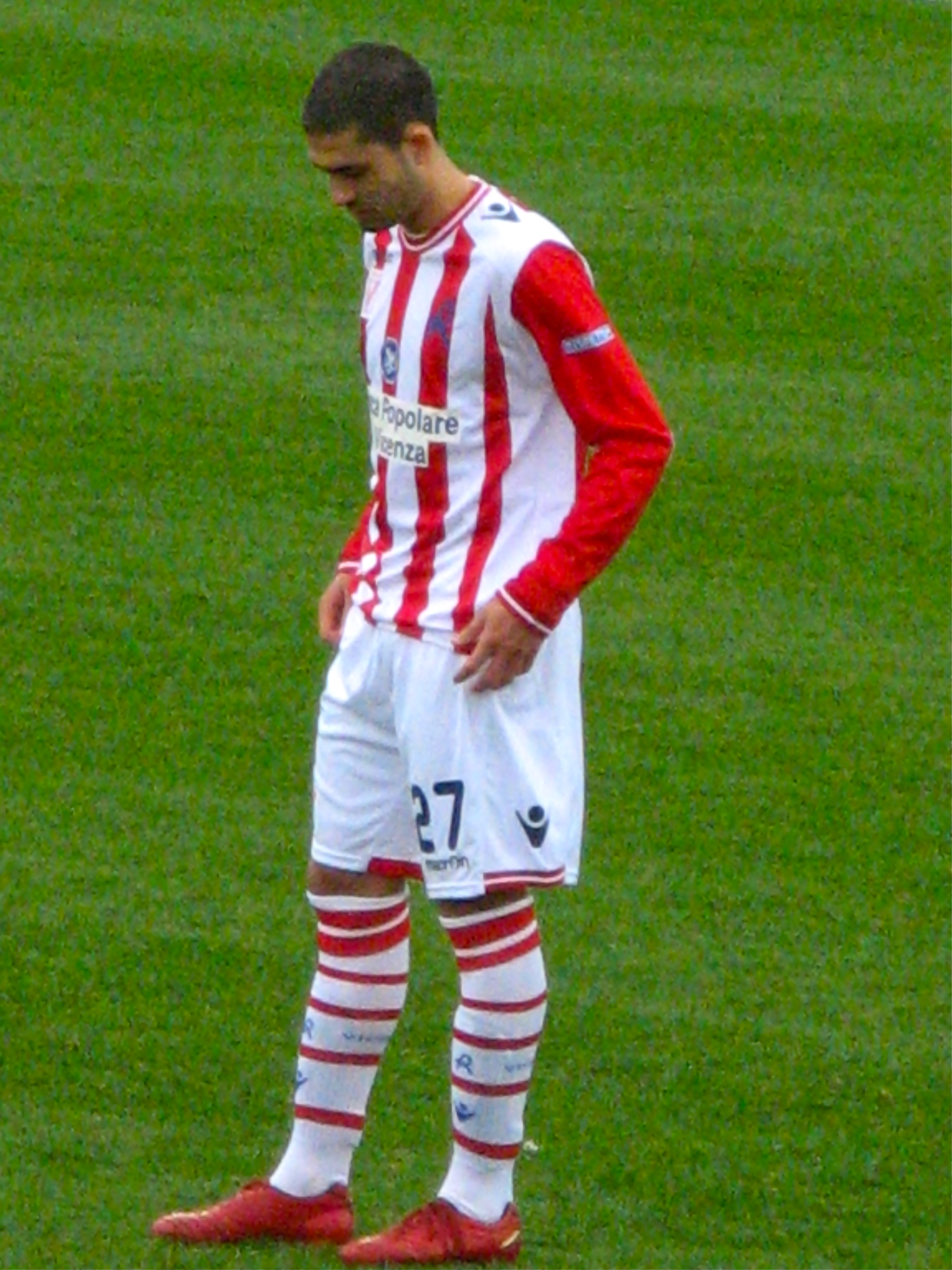

Personal information
- Date of birth: 25 February 1988 (age 38)
- Place of birth: Pescara, Italy
- Height: 1.79 m (5 ft 10 1/2 in)
- Position: Left back

Youth career
- 2006–2007: Pescara

Senior career*
Years	Team	Apps	(Gls)
2007–2008	Pescara	20	(1)
2008–2010	Palermo	2	(0)
2009	→ Cittadella (loan)	10	(0)
2009–2010	→ Crotone (loan)	6	(0)
2010–2011	Vicenza	43	(0)
2011–2012	Palermo	0	(0)
2012	→ Lecce (loan)	7	(0)
2012–2014	Vicenza	42	(2)
2014	Padova	8	(0)
2014–2015	Teramo	21	(0)
2015–2016	Virtus Lanciano	30	(1)
2016–2017	Latina	27	(0)
2017–2019	Lecce	30	(0)
2019–2021	Teramo	8	(0)
- * Club domestic league appearances and goals as of 2 May 2021

Luca Di Matteo (born 25 February 1988) is an Italian footballer who plays as a left back.

== Career ==
Di Matteo started his career with Pescara, establishing himself as a player with good potential despite his young age. On January 31, 2008 Palermo signed Di Matteo from then Serie C1 club Pescara, together with teammate Edgar Çani in co-ownership deal for €500,000 and €600,000 respectively. In June 2008 Pescara made a discount on both players, which both were sold for €450,000.

He made his Serie A debut on 27 April 2008 in a 0–0 home tie against Atalanta. Di Matteo was confirmed as part of the Palermo first team squad for the 2008–09 season, but was never featured on the patch and he was successively loaned out to Serie B outfit Cittadella on February 2, 2009 for the remainder of the season. He spent the first half of the 2009–10 season on loan to Crotone.

In February 2010, Di Matteo agreed to leave Crotone and join Vicenza, this time in a co-ownership bid between Palermo and his new club, for a peppercorn fee of €500.

Di Matteo made his second comeback to Palermo in June 2011, as his co-ownership was solved in favour of the rosanero for €200,000. In return Nicola Rigoni was sold back to Vicenza also for €200,000. After failing to make a single appearance with Palermo, he was loaned out to Lecce on 31 January 2012. He then returned to Vicenza in August 2012 after being deemed as surplus to requirements from Palermo, and played one season in Serie B and the first half of the 2013–14 season in the Lega Pro Prima Divisione.

In January 2014, he left Vicenza for Serie B club Padova, amassing only a total eight appearances for the club, and suffering a second consecutive relegation. He successively found himself without a club after Padova was excluded from the Italian league system due to financial issues.

On 12 July 2019 he returned to Teramo, signing a 2-year contract.
