= Júlio Sérgio =

Brazilian footballer (born 1978)

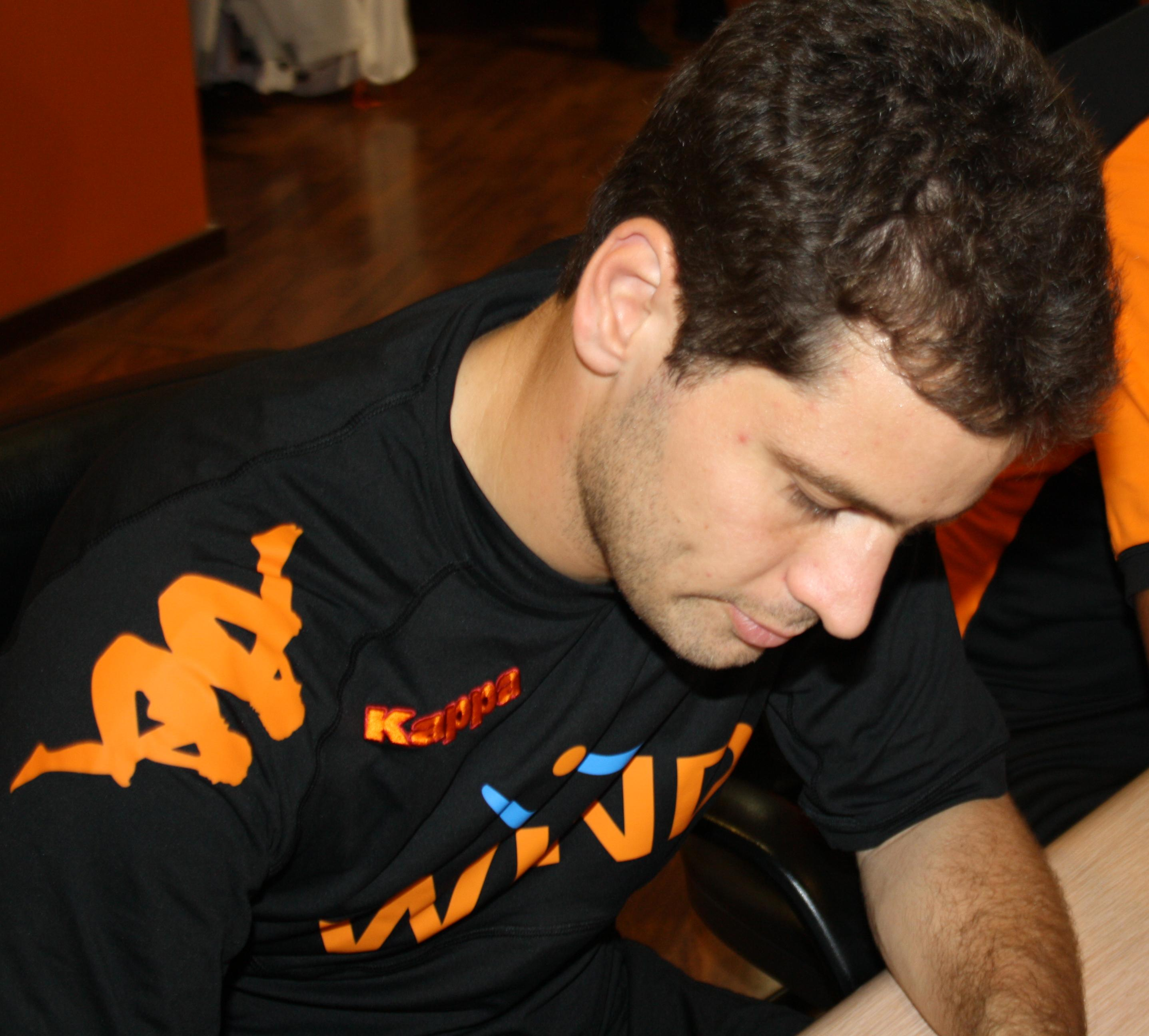

Personal information
- Full name: Júlio Sérgio Bertagnoli
- Date of birth: 8 November 1978 (age 47)
- Place of birth: Ribeirão Preto, Brazil
- Height: 1.87 m (6 ft 2 in)
- Position: Goalkeeper

Team information
- Current team: Coritiba (assistant)

Youth career
- 1995–1998: Botafogo-SP

Senior career*
Years	Team	Apps	(Gls)
1999–2000	Botafogo-SP	2	(0)
2000	Sertãozinho	0	(0)
2000	Inter de Bebedouro	0	(0)
2001	Francana	0	(0)
2001	Malutrom	0	(0)
2002	Comercial	0	(0)
2002–2004	Santos	41	(0)
2005	Juventude	0	(0)
2006	América-SP	0	(0)
2006–2013	Roma	49	(0)
2011–2012	→ Lecce (loan)	10	(0)
2014	Comercial	0	(0)
Total		102	(0)

Managerial career
- 2015–2016: CRAC
- 2017: Sertãozinho
- 2017: Olímpia
- 2018: Prudentópolis
- 2018: Linense
- 2019: Marília
- 2021–: Coritiba (assistant)
- 2021: Coritiba (interim)
- * Club domestic league appearances and goals as of 7 December 2013

Júlio Sérgio Bertagnoli (born 8 November 1978) is a Brazilian football manager and former player who played as a goalkeeper. He is the current assistant manager of Coritiba.

Júlio Sérgio also holds an Italian passport as his ancestor came from Ripa Teatina. He is currently a manager with Linense.

== Club career ==
=== Brazil ===
Júlio Sérgio was signed by Brazilian club América (SP) until the end of Campeonato Paulista in January 2006.

=== Roma ===
He signed a 1+3-year contract with Italian club Roma in July 2006, earning a gross salary of €260,000 as part of the deal. Due to an injury to first choice goalkeeper Doni and poor performances by backup Artur, Júlio Sérgio made his debut in Serie A on 30 August 2009 against Juventus, a game which Roma lost 1–3 and a defeat that lead to the resignation of Roma coach Luciano Spalletti. Despite this, Júlio Sérgio was preferred by new head coach Claudio Ranieri in his first game in-charge in a 2–1 away win at Siena on 13 September.

Strong performances ensured Julio Sérgio more regular football and ultimately allowed him to become the new first choice keeper for the Giallorossi. He saved a key penalty from Sergio Floccari during the Rome derby against Lazio, which Roma ultimately won 2–1. Roma was losing 1–0 before the penalty, and Júlio Sérgio's save was defined by head coach Claudio Ranieri as the turning point of the game. On 31 May 2010, he signed a new contract with the club, keeping him in the capital until 2014. His gross salary was increased to €1.3 million per year in the first year and €1.4 million in the second and the third, then €700,000 in the final year.

After Roma appointed new coach Vincenzo Montella, Doni returned to the side's starting XI. After a change in management and new ownership of AS Roma, and as the club had already signed Gianluca Curci in June, Júlio Sérgio and Doni, left the club shortly before the start of the 2011–12 Serie A season.

=== Lecce ===
Júlio Sérgio signed a season-long deal loan with Lecce in 2011. He played only seven games in first part of the season, partially because of his problem with injuries. From November 2011, Massimiliano Benassi served as first-choice, relegating Júlio Sérgio to the substitutes' bench. Third-choice Ugo Gabrieli also played when both Benassi and Júlio Sérgio were sidelined. He shortly returned to first choice in the penultimate match before the winter break, as Júlio Sérgio recovered in time but Benassi did not. However, he was replaced by Gabrieli in the first half. After the winter break, Júlio Sérgio was on the bench while Benassi was the starting goalkeeper in the first match against Juventus.

=== Return to Roma ===
Júlio Sérgio returned to Roma in July 2012 and refused to leave the club; as such, he was omitted from the first-team squad by manager Zdeněk Zeman. He was originally included in the squad for AS Roma's 2012–13 season as the fourth-choice goalkeeper for then manager Rudi Garcia. However, he was released from the club on 4 December 2013 and became a free agent.

== Honours ==
=== Club ===
Santos

- Campeonato Brasileiro Série A: 2002, 2004

Roma

- Coppa Italia: 2006–07, 2007–08; Runner-up: 2005–06
- Supercoppa Italiana: 2007; Runner-up: 2006
- Serie A Runner-up: 2005–06, 2006–07, 2007–08
