= Leonardo Migliónico =

Uruguayan footballer (born 1980)

Personal information
- Full name: Leonardo Martín Migliónico
- Date of birth: January 31, 1980 (age 46)
- Place of birth: Montevideo, Uruguay
- Height: 1.86 m (6 ft 1 in)
- Position: Defender

Team information
- Current team: 3 de Febrero

Senior career*
Years	Team	Apps	(Gls)
1998–2001	J.J. de Urquiza		
2001–2003	Estudiantes (BA)		
2003–2007	Piacenza	82	(6)
2008–2009	Sampdoria	4	(0)
2008–2009	→ Livorno (loan)	32	(2)
2009–2011	Livorno	57	(3)
2012	Lecce	15	(0)
2012–	Racing Club	17	(0)
2014–	3 de Febrero	7	(1)
- * Club domestic league appearances and goals as of 2 December 2014

Leonardo Martín Migliónico (born 31 January 1980) is a Uruguayan former footballer who played as a defender for 3 de Febrero.

== Club career ==
Migliónico's previous clubs include JJ Urquiza and Estudiantes (Buenos Aires).

He joined Sampdoria in January 2008 in a joint-ownership bid, where he met with former teammate Hugo Campagnaro.

He made his Serie A debut on 24 February 2008 in a 1–1 draw with Internazionale, and made three more first team appearances during the remainder of the season.

In July 2008 he was loaned out to Serie B side Livorno.

On 27 January 2012, Migliónico signed with Serie A side Lecce along with Manuele Blasi and Haris Seferovic.
