= Daniele Corvia =

Italian footballer (born 1984)

Personal information
- Date of birth: 20 November 1984 (age 41)
- Place of birth: Rome, Italy
- Height: 1.88 m (6 ft 2 in)
- Position: Forward

Team information
- Current team: Racing Aprilia (assistant coach)

Youth career
- Roma

Senior career*
Years	Team	Apps	(Gls)
2004–2005	Roma	16	(0)
2005–2006	Ternana	28	(3)
2006–2009	Siena	34	(2)
2008	→ Lecce (loan)	13	(6)
2008–2009	→ Empoli (loan)	36	(9)
2009–2012	Lecce	87	(25)
2012–2015	Brescia	81	(29)
2015–2017	Latina	62	(10)
2017–2018	Fondi	25	(5)
2018–2020	Racing Aprilia	48	(16)

International career
2004	Italy U21	2	(0)

Managerial career
- 2020–: Racing Aprilia (assistant)
- 2020: Racing Aprilia (caretaker)
- * Club domestic league appearances and goals

Daniele Corvia (born 20 November 1984) is an Italian football coach and a former player who played as a forward. He is an assistant coach for Italian Serie D club Racing Aprilia.

== Career ==
Born in Rome, capital of Italy, Corvia made his Serie A debut during 2003–04 Serie A season. In 2005 Corvia was farmed to Ternana for a peppercorn of €500.

Corvia joined Siena for €200,000 after the co-ownership deal with Ternana terminated with Roma favour, for €50,000. In June 2007, Siena bought him outright for another €375,000. In summer 2009 he started his second spell at U.S. Lecce, after spending the second half of the 2007–08 season with the club, helping them to promotion to the Serie A.

On 10 September 2012, he joined Serie B side Brescia on loan from Lega Pro Prima Divisione side Lecce following their relegation from the Serie A and subsequent expulsion from the Serie B. On 19 June 2013 Corvia joined Brescia outright for €180,000. On 2 August 2013 he signed a contract which last until 30 June 2016.

Yet on 13 July 2015 Corvia joined Latina on a free transfer.
