= Massimiliano Benassi =

Italian footballer (born 1981)

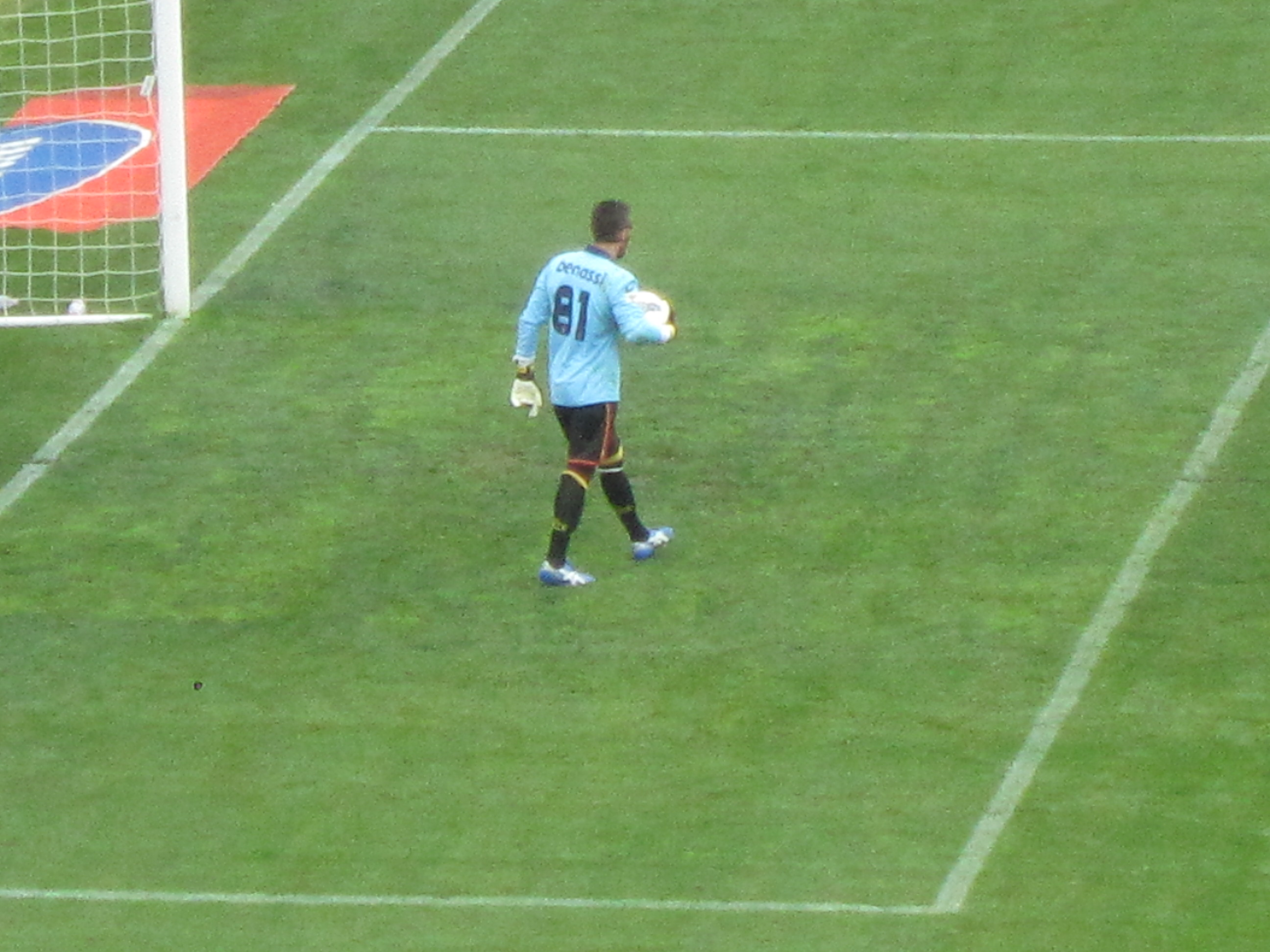

Personal information
- Full name: Massimiliano Benassi
- Date of birth: 11 November 1981 (age 44)
- Place of birth: Alatri, Lazio, Italy
- Height: 1.80 m (5 ft 11 in)
- Position: Goalkeeper

Senior career*
| Years | Team | Apps | (Gls) |
| 1999–2000 | Sangimignano | 12 | (0) |
| 2000–2003 | Poggibonsi | 64 | (0) |
| 2003–2006 | Sansovino | 101 | (0) |
| 2006–2007 | Juve Stabia | 33 | (0) |
| 2007–2008 | Sassuolo | 23 | (0) |
| 2008–2010 | Perugia | 66 | (0) |
| 2010–2017 | Lecce | 62 | (0) |
| 2013 | → Reggina (loan) | 17 | (0) |
| 2014 | → Juve Stabia (loan) | 13 | (0) |
| 2014–2015 | → Arezzo (loan) | 36 | (0) |
| 2016–2017 | → Arezzo (loan) | 23 | (0) |
| 2017–2018 | Casertana | 3 | (0) |
- * Club domestic league appearances and goals as of 25 November 2017

Massimiliano Benassi (born 11 November 1981) is a former Italian association footballer who played as a goalkeeper.

== Career ==
Benassi played in Italian third category (Serie c1-c2, now called "Prima Divisione" and "Seconda Divisione"), and later joined the promotion in "Serie B" with U.S. Sassuolo Calcio in 2008. Then he played on good levels with Perugia Calcio.

On 28 June 2011 he extended his contract with Lecce for one more year.
