= Stefano Ferrario =

Italian footballer

Personal information
- Date of birth: 28 March 1985 (age 41)
- Place of birth: Rho, Italy
- Height: 1.90 m (6 ft 3 in)
- Position: Centre back

Team information
- Current team: Cattolica

Youth career
- 2002–2004: Como

Senior career*
Years	Team	Apps	(Gls)
2004–2005	Como	17	(1)
2005–2007	Ternana	32	(0)
2007–2010	Ravenna	42	(3)
2010–2013	Lecce	50	(1)
2012	→ Parma (loan)	5	(0)
2014–2015	Lanciano	33	(1)
2015–2016	Catania	15	(0)
2016–2017	Sambenedettese	13	(0)
2017–2018	Arezzo	15	(0)
2018–2019	Forlì	9	(0)
2019	Tre Fiori	2	(1)
2019–	Cattolica	2	(0)
- * Club domestic league appearances and goals as of 13:42, 6 May 2020 (UTC)

Stefano Ferrario (born 28 March 1985) is an Italian former footballer who played for Serie D club Cattolica.

== Club career ==
Ferrario started his career at Calcio Como.

On 25 August 2005 Ferrario was signed by Ternana as a free agent. In 2007, he was sold to Ravenna in a co-ownership deal. In June 2009 Ravenna signed him outright.

=== Lecce ===
In January 2010, he was signed by Lecce. In January 2012, he was signed by Parma F.C. in a temporary deal, plus a buy-out clause, with Manuele Blasi moving to Lecce from Parma in a definitive deal. At the end of season Ferrario returned to Lecce.

He followed Lecce, relegated to 2012–13 Lega Pro Prima Divisione due to a match-fixing scandal. The club failed to promote back to Serie B in 2013, which finished as the losing side of the promotion playoffs. On 22 July 2013, the contract between Ferrario and Lecce, which was due to expire on 30 June 2014, was cancelled 10 months earlier.

=== Lanciano ===
On 8 November 2013, Ferrario was signed by Serie B club Lanciano as a free agent, with an optional second year of contract.

=== Catania ===
On 27 August 2015, Ferrario was signed by Calcio Catania in a 2-year contract. The team was relegated to 2015–16 Lega Pro due to another match-fixing scandal on 20 August 2015.

=== Sambenedettese ===
Ferrario was signed by Lega Pro newcomer Sambenedettese in a 1-year contract on 30 August 2016.

== International career ==
He was called up to the Italian under-19 squad for a match against Romania in 2004, but did not play.

== Honours ==
Lecce

- Serie B: 2009–10
