= Rodney Strasser =

Sierra Leonean footballer

Personal information
- Date of birth: 30 March 1990 (age 36)
- Place of birth: Freetown, Sierra Leone
- Height: 1.78 m (5 ft 10 in)
- Position: Defensive midfielder

Youth career
- 2006–2007: Kallon
- 2007–2010: AC Milan

Senior career*
| Years | Team | Apps | (Gls) |
| 2009–2010 | AC Milan | 2 | (0) |
| 2010–2011 | Genoa | 0 | (0) |
| 2010–2011 | → AC Milan (loan) | 5 | (1) |
| 2011–2013 | AC Milan | 2 | (0) |
| 2011–2012 | → Lecce (loan) | 13 | (1) |
| 2013 | → Parma (loan) | 2 | (0) |
| 2013–2017 | Genoa | 0 | (0) |
| 2013–2014 | → Reggina (loan) | 22 | (0) |
| 2015 | → Livorno (loan) | 2 | (0) |
| 2015–2016 | → Lupa Castelli Romani (loan) | 16 | (1) |
| 2016 | → NK Zagreb (loan) | 12 | (0) |
| 2016–2017 | → Gil Vicente (loan) | 13 | (0) |
| 2018–2019 | Villafranca | 14 | (0) |
| 2020–2021 | TPS | 9 | (0) |
| 2021–2022 | Cattolica | 6 | (0) |
| 2023–2024 | FAVL Cimini | | |

International career^{‡}
| 2010–2021 | Sierra Leone | 13 | (0) |
- * Club domestic league appearances and goals as of 1 November 2024 ‡ National team caps and goals as of 28 June 2026

Rodney Strasser (born 30 March 1990) is a Sierra Leonean professional footballer who plays as a defensive midfielder.

== Club career ==
=== AC Milan ===
Born in Freetown, Strasser began his career at local club Kallon, before moving to Italy to join AC Milan in 2007. During his time in Milan's youth system, he was a member of the under-20 side, who won the 2009–10 Coppa Italia Primavera. He made his first-team debut on 21 December 2008, in a 5–1 win against Udinese, coming on as a substitute for Kakha Kaladze in the 82nd minute.

=== Genoa ===
On 20 July 2010, Milan announced that half of the rights to Strasser had been purchased by Genoa for €2.25 million, as part of the deal that saw defender Sokratis Papastathopoulos move to Milan. Strasser, however, would stay at Milan on loan, joining the first-team squad permanently. His first appearance of the season was in a UEFA Champions League group stage 2–0 win against Auxerre – which also marked his debut in European club competition – on 23 November. He went on to score his first professional goal in a 1–0 league win over Cagliari, on 6 January.

=== Milan return ===
In May 2011, his co-ownership was dissolved in favour of Milan for the same price and renewed his contract to June 2016. (with Papastathopoulos moved back to Genoa), but Strasser subsequently joined Lecce on loan. He appeared in 13 games and scored one goal for his new team, before suffering a broken ankle in a game against Juventus on 9 January and subsequently being called back to Milan to undergo rehabilitation. He made his return on 10 April, coming on as a substitute in the second half of a game against Chievo, which Milan won 1–0. At the start of the following season, Strasser sustained another injury which would rule him out for three months. After recovering he struggled to get playing time, making only one Coppa Italia appearance before being loaned out to Parma during the January transfer window.

=== Genoa return ===
On 27 July 2013, Strasser joined Genoa on a permanent deal for €3.5 million, as part of Kévin Constant's co-ownership resolution in favour of Milan for €6 million. Strasser was loaned out to Serie B team Reggina in August 2013. As of January 2019, Strasser played for the Serie D team Villafranca.

== International career ==
Strasser made his international debut for the Sierra Leone national team on 5 September 2010, in a 2012 Africa Cup of Nations qualification game against Egypt.

== Career statistics ==
=== Club ===
As of 27 July 2013

Appearances and goals by club, season and competition
| Club | Season | League | | Cup | | Continental (Note: Includes UEFA Champions League, UEFA Cup.) | | Other | | Total | |
| Club | Season | Apps | Goals | Apps | Goals | Apps | Goals | Apps | Goals | Apps | Goals |
|---|---|---|---|---|---|---|---|---|---|---|---|
| AC Milan | 2008–09 | 1 | 0 | 0 | 0 | 0 | 0 | – | | 1 | 0 |
| AC Milan | 2009–10 | 1 | 0 | 0 | 0 | 0 | 0 | – | | 1 | 0 |
| AC Milan | 2010–11 | 3 | 1 | 0 | 0 | 2 | 0 | – | | 5 | 1 |
| AC Milan | 2011–12 | 1 | 0 | 0 | 0 | 0 | 0 | – | | 1 | 0 |
| AC Milan | 2012–13 | 0 | 0 | 1 | 0 | 0 | 0 | – | | 1 | 0 |
| AC Milan | Total | 6 | 1 | 1 | 0 | 2 | 0 | 0 | 0 | 9 | 1 |
| Lecce (loan) | 2011–12 | 12 | 1 | 1 | 0 | – | | – | | 13 | 1 |
| Parma (loan) | 2012–13 | 2 | 0 | – | | – | | – | | 2 | 0 |
| Career total | | 20 | 2 | 2 | 0 | 2 | 0 | 0 | 0 | 24 | 2 |

=== International ===
As of 3 October 2013

Appearances and goals by national team and year
| National team | Year | Apps | Goals |
|---|---|---|---|
| Sierra Leone | 2010 | 2 | 0 |
| Sierra Leone | 2011 | 4 | 0 |
| Sierra Leone | 2012 | 0 | 0 |
| Sierra Leone | 2013 | 2 | 0 |
| Total | | 8 | 0 |

== Honours ==
Milan

- Serie A: 2010–11
