= 2002–03 US Lecce season =

U.S. Lecce
2002–2003 season
- Chairman: Quirico Semeraro
- Manager: Delio Rossi
- Serie B: 3rd (promoted in A)
- Coppa Italia: First round
- Top goalscorer: League: Chevantón (16); All: Chevantón (18)
- Highest home attendance: 35,038 vs. Palermo (7 June 2003)
- Lowest home attendance: 5,163 vs. Messina (1 March 2003)
- Average home league attendance: 210,042 (Serie B)

== Season ==
2001–02 relegation brought Lecce in Serie B for an only year: Delio Rossi's team was unbeaten for 17 games, from 14 September 2002 to 18 January 2003 (including two initial matches, postponed due to lacking coverage of television rights). They came at third place, getting an immediate promotion.

== Squad ==
Squad at the end of the season.

=== Goalkeepers ===
- (France) Stephane Coque
- (Italy) Antonio Rosati
- (Italy) Generoso Rossi
- (Montenegro) Vukasin Poleksic

=== Defenders ===
- (France) Philippe Billy
- (Italy) Bruno Cirillo
- (France) Nicolas Laspalles
- (Italy) Erminio Rullo
- (Italy) Gianluca Colonnello
- (Italy) Alessandro Zoppetti
- (Italy) Lorenzo Stovini
- (Italy) Giuseppe Abruzzese
- (Italy) Cristian Silvestri
- (Italy) Cesare Bovo
- (Ivory Coast) Arnaud Kouyo
- (Italy) David Balleri

=== Midfielders ===
- (Mali) Drissa Diarra
- (Italy) Cristian Antonio Agnelli
- (Italy) Alessandro Conticchio
- (Italy) Max Tonetto
- (Uruguay) Guillermo Giacomazzi
- (Netherlands) Djuric Winklaar
- (Italy) Alfonso Camorani
- (Italy) Rodolfo Giorgetti
- (Italy) Luigi Piangerelli
- (Italy) Giorgio Di Vicino
- (Italy) Matteo Superbi
- (Argentina) Cristian Daniel Ledesma
- (Italy) Marco Donadel

=== Attackers ===
- (Montenegro) Mirko Vučinić
- (Bulgaria) Valeri Bojinov
- (Slovenia) Sebastjan Cimirotič
- (Uruguay) Javier Chevantón
- (Croatia) Davor Vugrinec
- (Italy) Alessandro Corallo
- (Italy) Italo Mattioli
- (Argentina) Aldo Osorio
- (Ivory Coast) Axel Cédric Konan

=== Manager ===
- (Italy) Delio Rossi

== Serie B ==
=== League table ===
Pos	Team	Pld	W	D	L	GF	GA	GD	Pts	Promotion or relegation
1	Siena (P, C)	38	17	16	5	46	26	+20	67	Promotion to Serie A
2	Sampdoria (P)	38	17	16	5	53	31	+22	67	Promotion to Serie A
3	Lecce (P)	38	15	18	5	46	33	+13	63	Promotion to Serie A
4	Ancona (P)	38	16	13	9	53	40	+13	61	Promotion to Serie A
5	Triestina	38	16	10	12	54	46	+8	58	

Source: Almanacco Illustrato del Calcio - La Storia 1898-2004, Panini Edizioni, Modena, September 2005
Rules for classification: 1) points; 2) head-to-head points; 3) head-to-head goal difference; 4) head-to-head goals scored; 5) goal difference; 6) number of goals scored.
(C) Champions; (P) Promoted

=== Results summary ===
Overall								Home						Away					
Pld	W	D	L	GF	GA	GD	Pts	W	D	L	GF	GA	GD	W	D	L	GF	GA	GD
38	15	18	5	46	33	+13	63	10	9	0	25	12	+13	5	9	5	21	21	0

Updated to 7 June 2003.

== Sources ==
- RSSF - Italy 2002/03
