= 2003–04 US Lecce season =

U.S. Lecce
2003–04 season
- Manager: Delio Rossi
- Stadium: Stadio Via del Mare
- Serie A: 10th
- Coppa Italia: First round
- Top goalscorer: Javier Chevantón (19)

During the 2003–04 Italian football season, U.S. Lecce competed in the Serie A.

== Season summary ==
U.S. Lecce finished the season in 10th position in the Serie A table. In other competitions, Lecce reached the quarter-finals of the Coppa Italia.

Javier Chevantón was the top scorer for Lecce with 19 goals in all competitions.

== Squad ==
=== Goalkeepers ===
- (Italy) Vincenzo Sicignano
- (Italy) Andrea Panico
- (Serbia and Montenegro) Vukašin Poleksić

=== Defenders ===
- (Italy) Giuseppe Abruzzese
- (France) Philippe Billy
- (Italy) Cesare Bovo
- (Ivory Coast) Arnaud Kouyo
- (Italy) Erminio Rullo
- (Italy) Cristian Silvestri
- (Italy) Sebastiano Siviglia
- (Italy) Lorenzo Stovini

=== Midfielders ===
- (Colombia) Jorge Bolaño
- (Italy) Marco Cassetti
- (Mali) Drissa Diarra
- (Uruguay) Guillermo Giacomazzi
- (Argentina) Cristian Ledesma
- (Italy) Nicola Mariniello
- (Italy) Max Tonetto
- (Italy) Daniele Franceschini

=== Attackers ===
- (Bulgaria) Valeri Bojinov
- (Uruguay) Javier Chevantón
- (France) Wilfried Dalmat
- (Ivory Coast) Cedric Axel Konan
- (Serbia and Montenegro) Mirko Vučinić

== Results ==
=== Serie A ===
Pos	Team	Pld	W	D	L	GF	GA	GD	Pts
8	Sampdoria	34	11	13	10	40	42	−2	46
9	Chievo	34	11	11	12	36	37	−1	44
10	Lecce	34	11	8	15	43	56	−13	41
11	Brescia	34	9	13	12	52	57	−5	40
12	Bologna	34	10	9	15	45	53	−8	39

Source: Almanacco Illustrato del Calcio – La Storia 1898-2004, Panini Edizioni, Modena, September 2005
Rules for classification: 1) points; 2) tiebreaker for relevant positions 3) head-to-head points and goal difference; 4) head-to-head goals scored; 5) goal difference; 6) number of goals scored.

31 August 2003 1	Lazio	4–1	Lecce	Rome
15:00	Albertini 18'; Corradi 24'; Fiore 36'; Oddo 83'		Konan 49'	Stadium: Stadio Olimpico

14 September 2003 2	Lecce	3–1	Ancona	Lecce
15:00	Scarpi 34' (o.g.); Vučinic 79'; Cassetti 84'		Ganz 68' (pen.)	Stadium: Stadio Via del Mare

21 September 2003 3	Lecce	1–2	Chievo	Lecce
15:00	Chevantón 59'		Lanna 53'; Cossato 71'	Stadium: Stadio Via del Mare

28 September 2003 4	Milan	3–0	Lecce	Milan
15:00	Shevchenko 20', 69'; Tomasson 90'			Stadium: Stadio San Siro

5 October 2003 5	Lecce	1–4	Brescia	Lecce
15:00	Cassetti 32'		Caracciolo 7', 68', 84'; Baggio 87'	Stadium: Stadio Via del Mare

19 October 2003 6	Modena	2–0	Lecce	Modena
15:00	Vignaroli 63'; Kamara 90'			Stadium: Stadio Alberto Braglia

25 October 2003 7	Siena	2–1	Lecce	Siena
18:00	Taddei 12'; Chiesa 76'		Chevantón 9'	Stadium: Stadio Artemio Franchi

2 November 2003 8	Lecce	2–1	Empoli	Lecce
15:00	Chevantón 1' (pen.), 43'		Rocchi 59'	Stadium: Stadio Via del Mare

9 November 2003 9	Perugia	2–2	Lecce	Perugia
15:00	Margiotta 45'; Grosso 82'		Chevantón 7'; Ledesma 56'	Stadium: Stadio Renato Curi

23 November 2003 10	Lecce	0–0	Sampdoria	Lecce
15:00				Stadium: Stadio Via del Mare

30 November 2003 11	Roma	3–1	Lecce	Rome
15:00	Mancini 18'; Carew 45'; Totti 76'		Chevantón 88'	Stadium: Stadio Olimpico

7 December 2003 12	Lecce	1–2	Parma	Lecce
15:00	Chevantón 70'		Gilardino 47', 78'	Stadium: Stadio Via del Mare

13 December 2003 13	Udinese	1–0	Lecce	Udine
18:00	Pinzi 31'			Stadium: Stadio Friuli

21 December 2003 14	Lecce	1–1	Juventus	Lecce
15:00	Konan 24'		Trezeguet 86'	Stadium: Stadio Via del Mare

6 January 2004 15	Inter	3–1	Lecce	Milan
15:00	Cruz 50'; Córdoba 60'; Vieri 85'		Bovo 3'	Stadium: Stadio San Siro

11 January 2004 16	Lecce	1–2	Bologna	Lecce
20:30	Bojinov 22'		Pecchia 13'; Tare 77'	Stadium: Stadio Via del Mare

18 January 2004 17	Reggina	1–3	Lecce	Reggio Calabria
15:00	Cozza 26'		Bojinov 3', 60'; Chevantón 4'	Stadium: Stadio Oreste Granillo

25 January 2004 18	Lecce	0–1	Lazio	Lecce
15:00			César 55'	Stadium: Stadio Via del Mare

1 February 2004 19	Ancona	0–2	Lecce	Ancona
15:00			Chevantón 1'; Konan 61'	Stadium: Stadio del Conero

7 February 2004 20	Chievo	2–3	Lecce	Verona
18:00	Luciano 45'; D'Anna 87' (pen.)		Barzagli 17' (o.g.); Chevantón 20'; Cassetti 57'	Stadium: Stadio Marcantonio Bentegodi

15 February 2004 21	Lecce	1–1	Milan	Lecce
15:00	Chevantón 19'		Shevchenko 53'	Stadium: Stadio Via del Mare

22 February 2004 22	Brescia	1–2	Lecce	Brescia
20:30	Baggio 90'		Chevantón 12'; Cassetti 87'	Stadium: Stadio Mario Rigamonti

29 February 2004 23	Lecce	1–0	Modena	Lecce
15:00	Chevantón 22' (pen.)			Stadium: Stadio Via del Mare

7 March 2004 24	Lecce	0–0	Siena	Lecce
15:00				Stadium: Stadio Via del Mare

13 March 2004 25	Empoli	0–0	Lecce	Empoli
20:30				Stadium: Stadio Carlo Castellani

21 March 2004 26	Lecce	1–2	Perugia	Lecce
15:00	Dalmat 86'		Brienza 14'; Di Loreto 60'	Stadium: Stadio Via del Mare

28 March 2004 27	Sampdoria	2–2	Lecce	Genoa
15:00	Flachi 7', 42'		Chevanton 36' (pen.); Konan 90'	Stadium: Stadio Luigi Ferraris

4 April 2004 28	Lecce	0–3	Roma	Lecce
15:00			Emerson 51'; Bovo 54' (o.g.); Totti 90' (pen.)	Stadium: Stadio Via del Mare

10 April 2004 29	Parma	3–1	Lecce	Parma
15:00	Carbone 1'; Gilardino 41', 85'		Chevantón 62'	Stadium: Stadio Ennio Tardini

17 April 2004 30	Lecce	2–1	Udinese	Lecce
20:30	Cassetti 44'; Chevantón 85'		Jørgensen 23'	Stadium: Stadio Via del Mare

25 April 2004 31	Juventus	3–4	Lecce	Turin
15:00	Trezeguet 2'; Maresca 55'; Del Piero 80'		Franceschini 23'; Konan 31', 43'; Chevantón 52'	Stadium: Stadio Delle Alpi

2 May 2004 32	Lecce	2–1	Inter	Lecce
15:00	Tonetto 47'; Bovo 70'		Adriano 35' (pen.)	Stadium: Stadio Via del Mare

9 May 2004 33	Bologna	1–1	Lecce	Bologna
15:00	Tare 34'		Chevantón 90'	Stadium: Stadio Renato Dall'Ara

16 May 2004 34	Lecce	2–1	Reggina	Lecce
15:00	Chevantón 10'; Franceschini 37'		Dall'Acqua 31'	Stadium: Stadio Via del Mare
