= 2010–11 US Lecce season =

U.S. Lecce
2010–11 season
- President: (Italy) Pierandrea Semeraro
- Head Coach: (Italy) Luigi De Canio
- Serie A: 17th
- Coppa Italia: Fourth round
- Top goalscorer: League: David Di Michele (8 goals); All: David Di Michele (8 goals)

The 2010–11 season was Lecce's 102nd in existence. Lecce returned to the top flight of Italian football, for the first time since the 2005–06 season after completing the 2009–10 Serie B season in first place.

== Pre-season and friendlies ==
Lecce began a pre-season training camp in Tarvisio on July 15.

Date	Opponents	H / A	Result F – A	Scorers
24 July 2010	Nazionale Montepaschi	N	8 – 0	Corvia (2) 2', 67', Ferrario 13', Mesbah (2) 19', 68', Munari 26', Falcone 70', Vives 75'
28 July 2010	Rappresentativa Friuli Venezia Giulia	N	9 – 0	Corvia (3) 27', 56', 65', Bergougnoux (2) 37', 45', Munari 44', Giacomazzi 68', Falcone (2) 69', 87'
1 August 2010	Tamai	N	5 – 0	Rubén Olivera 8', Corvia 10', Mesbah 60', Donati 64', Grossmüller 68'
4 August 2010	Triestina	N	3 – 1	Mesbah 12', Corvia 77', Giacomazzi 86'
12 August 2010^{1}	Pisticci	A	0 – 1	Grossmüller 40'
12 August 2010^{1}	Salernitana	N	1 – 0	Grossmüller 8'
22 August 2010	Valencia	H	0 – 2	

^{1} 45 minute matches played during "Memorial Gaetano Michetti".

== Serie A ==
Lecce will return to Serie A action on August 29. They will start the season away to Milan.

=== League table ===
Pos	Team	Pld	W	D	L	GF	GA	GD	Pts	Qualification or relegation
15	Cesena	38	11	10	17	38	50	−12	43	
16	Bologna	38	11	12	15	35	52	−17	42 (Note: Bologna were deducted a total 3 points: 1 point because of unpaid taxes, plus 2 points because of unpaid wages.)	
17	Lecce	38	11	8	19	46	66	−20	41	
18	Sampdoria (R)	38	8	12	18	33	49	−16	36	Relegation to Serie B
19	Brescia (R)	38	7	11	20	34	52	−18	32	Relegation to Serie B

Source: Lega Serie A
Rules for classification: 1) points; 2) head-to-head points; 3) head-to-head goal difference; 4) head-to-head goals scored; 5) goal difference; 6) number of goals scored.
(R) Relegated

== Coppa Italia ==
Based on their finish in the 2009-10 Serie B season, Lecce will enter the 2010–11 Coppa Italia in the third round. Their first opponent in the competition will be Serie B club Siena.

== Squad statistics ==
No.	Pos	Nat	Player	Total		Serie A		Coppa Italia	
No.	Pos	Nat	Player	Apps	Goals	Apps	Goals	Apps	Goals
2	DF	(Italy) ITA	Giulio Donati	16	0	14	0	2	0
3	MF	(Italy) ITA	Alberto Giuliatto	13	0	12	0	1	0
4	DF	(Brazil) BRA	Gustavo	25	0	24	0	1	0
5	DF	(Italy) ITA	Simone Sini	2	0	2	0	0	0
7	MF	(France) FRA	Bryan Bergougnoux	2	0	0	0	2	0
8	MF	(Italy) ITA	Gianni Munari	35	2	34	2	1	0
9	FW	(Italy) ITA	Daniele Corvia	31	7	30	6	1	1
10	MF	(Uruguay) URU	Rubén Olivera	32	4	31	4	1	0
11	MF	(Algeria) ALG	Djamel Mesbah	34	2	34	2	0	0
13	DF	(Italy) ITA	Stefano Ferrario	20	0	20	0	0	0
14	MF	(Brazil) BRA	Fabiano	29	1	29	1	0	0
15	MF	(Nigeria) NGA	Edward Ofere	12	3	11	3	1	0
17	FW	(Italy) ITA	David Di Michele	23	8	23	8	0	0
18	MF	(Uruguay) URU	Guillermo Giacomazzi	32	3	32	3	0	0
19	MF	(Argentina) ARG	Ignacio Piatti	26	3	25	3	1	0
20	MF	(Italy) ITA	Giuseppe Vives	33	0	33	0	0	0
21	MF	(Uruguay) URU	Carlos Grossmüller	25	1	23	1	2	0
22	GK	(Italy) ITA	Antonio Rosati	38	-64	38	-64	0	0
23	FW	(Uruguay) URU	Javier Chevantón	16	4	14	2	2	2
27	FW	(Brazil) BRA	Jeda	26	4	25	4	1	0
28	DF	(Italy) ITA	Davide Brivio	24	0	22	0	2	0
30	DF	(Mali) MLI	Souleymane Diamoutene	3	1	2	1	1	0
32	MF	(Italy) ITA	Manuel Coppola	16	1	14	1	2	0
33	DF	(Italy) ITA	Andrea Rispoli	14	0	13	0	1	0
40	DF	(Serbia) SRB	Nenad Tomović	16	0	16	0	0	0
50	FW	(Italy) ITA	Luigi Falcone	1	0	0	0	1	0
56	MF	(Italy) ITA	Luca Locci	1	0	0	0	1	0
57	MF	(Italy) ITA	Filippo Falco	1	0	0	0	1	0
81	GK	(Italy) ITA	Massimiliano Benassi	3	-6	1	-2	2	-4
91	MF	(Italy) ITA	Andrea Bertolacci	10	4	9	3	1	1

== Transfers ==
=== In ===
Date	Pos.	Name	From	Fee
2 July 2010	MF	(Uruguay) Rubén Olivera	(Uruguay) Peñarol	Free
22 July 2010	GK	(Italy) Massimiliano Benassi	(Italy) Perugia	Free
30 July 2010	MF	(Uruguay) Carlos Grossmüller	(Germany) Schalke	Free
4 August 2010	MF	(Argentina) Ignacio Piatti	(Argentina) Independiente	Undisclosed
