= Bondioli =

Bondioli is an Italian surname. Notable persons with the surname include:

- Andrea Bondioli (born 1997), Italian footballer
- Federico Bondioli (born 2005), Italian tennis player
- Giacinto Bondioli (1596–1636), Italian Dominican prior and composer
- Pietro Antonio Bondioli (1765–1808), Italian physician
