= Roberto Rizzo =

Italian footballer and manager

Personal information
- Date of birth: 20 October 1961 (age 65)
- Place of birth: San Cesario di Lecce, Italy
- Height: 1.77 m (5 ft 10 in)
- Position: Midfielder

Youth career
- Lecce

Senior career*
Years	Team	Apps	(Gls)
1980–1981	Lecce	3	(0)
1981–1982	→ Cosenza (loan)	31	(4)
1982–1986	Lecce	69	(4)
1986–1987	Salernitana	31	(1)
1987–1991	Monopoli	124	(12)
1991–1992	Perugia	16	(0)
1992–1994	Monopoli	46	(4)

Managerial career
- 2002–2006: Lecce (youth team)
- 2006: Lecce (assistant)
- 2006: Martina
- 2007–2008: Casarano
- 2010: Matera
- 2010–2011: Lecce (assistant)
- 2012: Genoa (assistant)
- 2013–2014: Catania (assistant)
- 2016: Virtus Lanciano (assistant)
- 2017: Lecce
- * Club domestic league appearances and goals as of 10 September 2017

Roberto Rizzo (born 20 October 1961 in San Cesario di Lecce) is a former Italian football midfielder and current manager.

== Career ==
=== Player ===
During his career, Rizzo represented U.S. Lecce (two stints) and other teams. He made his Serie A debut on 8 December 1985 with Lecce against Como.

=== Coach ===
Having retired in 1994, Rizzo started as coach of Lecce youth team and won 2 Campionati Primavera (2002–03, 2003–04), 2 Coppe Italia (2001–02, 2004–05) and 2 Supercoppe italiane (2004, 2005).

In January 2006, he was appointed manager of Lecce in Serie A together with Franco Paleari. He won a Coppa Italia Serie D with Matera in 2009–10.

He was named assistant coach of Lecce, Genoa and Catania in Serie A and Virtus Lanciano in Serie B.

On 24 April 2017, he was confirmed as the new manager of Lecce in Lega Pro. He led Lecce to the play-off quarter-finals and extended his deal for another season.

On 10 September 2017 he quit for personal reasons, after three Serie C matches.

== Honours ==
=== Manager ===
Lecce

- Campionato Primavera: 2002–03, 2003–04
- Coppa Italia Primavera: 2001–02, 2004–05
- Supercoppa Primavera: 2004, 2005

Matera

- Coppa Italia Serie D: 2009–10
