= Alberto Giuliatto =

Italian footballer (born 1983)

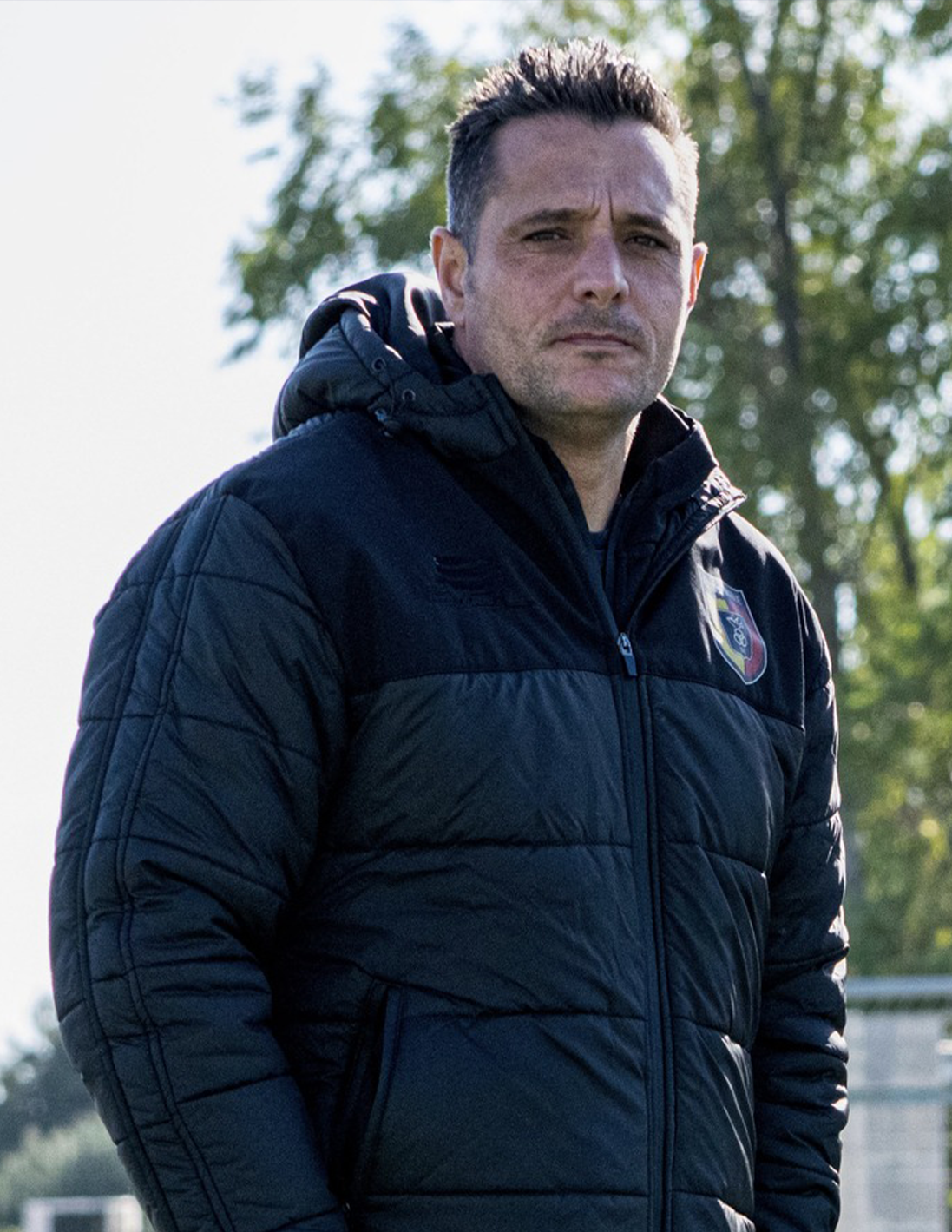

Personal information
- Date of birth: 17 September 1983 (age 43)
- Place of birth: Treviso, Italy
- Height: 1.79 m (5 ft 10 1/2 in)
- Position: Defender

Team information
- Current team: Venezia

Youth career
- –2001: Treviso

Senior career*
Years	Team	Apps	(Gls)
2001–2005	Belluno	109	(15)
2005–2007	Treviso	38	(1)
2007–2011	Lecce	85	(1)
2012–2013	Nocerina	18	(1)
2013–	Parma	0	(0)
2013–2014	→ Savona (loan)	22	(0)
2014–2015	→ Venezia (loan)		
- * Club domestic league appearances and goals

Alberto Giuliatto (born 17 September 1983) is an Italian former football player who played as a left defender for Italian third division club Venezia, on loan from Parma F.C.

== Career ==
Giuliatto started his career at Treviso, his hometown team, but he made his debut with Belluno in the Italian Serie D. He played there for four seasons, including a one-year spell in the Serie C2. In 2005, he returned to Treviso and became the first player from Treviso to play for his local side in the Serie A, where he made his debut on 18 September 2005 against Lazio at the Stadio Olimpico and played in 18 matches.

=== Lecce ===
The next season saw him in the Serie B on the books of Treviso (until January 2007) and US Lecce, who signed him in the winter transfer window to replace Erminio Rullo, in co-ownership deal for €1.3 million. In June 2007 Lecce acquired him outright for undisclosed fee. In 2007-08 he appeared in 23 matches as Lecce celebrated his return to Serie A. Giuliatto was released on 1 July 2011.

=== Nocerina ===
In second half of 2011–12 Serie B season he joined A.S.G. Nocerina. He became a free agent again on 1 July 2012, after the team relegated to 2012–13 Lega Pro Prima Divisione.

Giuliatto was re-signed by Nocerina in November 2012. However, he sidelined for several months.

On 24 July 2013 he was signed by Serie A club Parma but on 27 July 2013 farmed to the third division club Savona along with Gabriele Puccio and Alberto Galuppo.

On 23 July 2014 he was signed by F.B.C. Unione Venezia.
