= Giovanni Rosati =

Italian footballer

Personal information
- Date of birth: 24 June 1952 (age 74)
- Place of birth: Rome, Italy
- Height: 1.77 m (5 ft 9 1/2 in)
- Position: Midfielder

Senior career*
Years	Team	Apps	(Gls)
1971–1972	Roma	3	(0)
1972–1973	Rimini	18	(0)
1978–1979	Brindisi	31	(5)
1979–1981	L'Aquila	28	(0)
- * Club domestic league appearances and goals

Giovanni Rosati (born 24 June 1952) is an Italian former professional footballer who played as a midfielder.

He made 98 appearances in the Italian professional leagues, including 3 in Serie A in his debut 1971–72 season for A.S. Roma.
