= Pantaleo Corvino =

Italian director of football

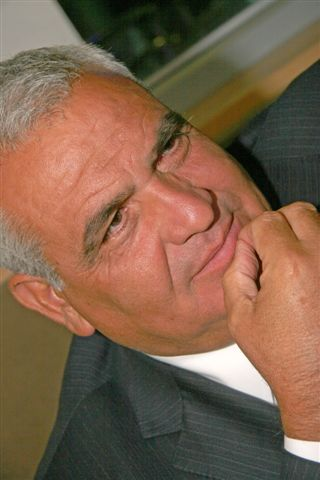
Corvino in 2008

Pantaleo Corvino (born 12 December 1949) is an Italian director of football, currently working for Lecce.

== Career ==
After his father's death, he was forced to interrupt his career as a player and became non-commissioned officer.

His early career in management started in his town, Vernole. He then worked for Scorrano before moving to then Serie C1 side Casarano, thus turning to professional football. During his 10-year spell there, he signed Fabrizio Miccoli.

He was sporting director of Lecce from 1998 to 2005, gaining a reputation for scouting and signing new talents such as strikers Javier Chevantón, Valeri Bojinov (whom he discovered at the age of 14 while playing for Pietà Hotspurs), Mirko Vučinić and midfielder Cristian Ledesma. In June 2000, he was about to sign Bulgarian player Dimitar Berbatov, who would later enjoy successful career. Corvino said in an interview that Berbatov had already undergone a medical, but when it came to signing the contract, the move collapsed, probably due to another request by the player himself.

He has been in the books of Fiorentina since 2005. At Fiorentina, he most notably signed Zdravko Kuzmanović, Stevan Jovetić, Pablo Daniel Osvaldo, Felipe Melo, Juan Manuel Vargas, Artur Boruc, Luca Toni, Alberto Gilardino, Adrian Mutu and many other players.

In March, 2012, Fiorentina officially declared that Corvino's contract would not be renewed. He was replaced by former AS Roma Director, Daniele Pradè.
