= Giovanni Degni =

Italian footballer and manager

Personal information
- Date of birth: 28 September 1900
- Place of birth: Rome, Italy
- Date of death: 2 November 1975 (aged 75)
- Position: Midfielder

Senior career*
Years	Team	Apps	(Gls)
1919–1921	Fortitudo		
1921–1927	Alba-Audace	81	(44)
1927–1931	Roma	68	(0)
1931–1932	Lecce	23	(0)
1932–1934	Catania	41	(2)
Total		213	(46)

Managerial career
- 1937–1939: Catania
- 1939–1942: Anconitana-Bianchi
- 1942–1943: Lecce
- 1943–1944: Avia
- 1944: Ala Italiana
- 1945–1947: Roma
- 1948: Catania
- 1949–1950: Anconitana
- 1952: Narnese
- 1952–1953: Lecce
- 1953–1954: Narnese
- 1954–1955: L'Aquila
- 1962: Narnese
- * Club domestic league appearances and goals

Giovanni Degni (28 September 1900 – 2 November 1975) was an Italian football midfielder and manager from Rome. He was born in Rome. He spent the largest majority of his playing career in his home town, appearing for Alba and eventually A.S. Roma in their formative seasons.

After his playing career ended, he went on to management; spending some time at Catania and Roma once more.

== Honours ==
Alba

- Italian Football Championship runners-up: 1924–25, 1925–26
