= Valeri Bojinov =

Bulgarian footballer (born 1986)

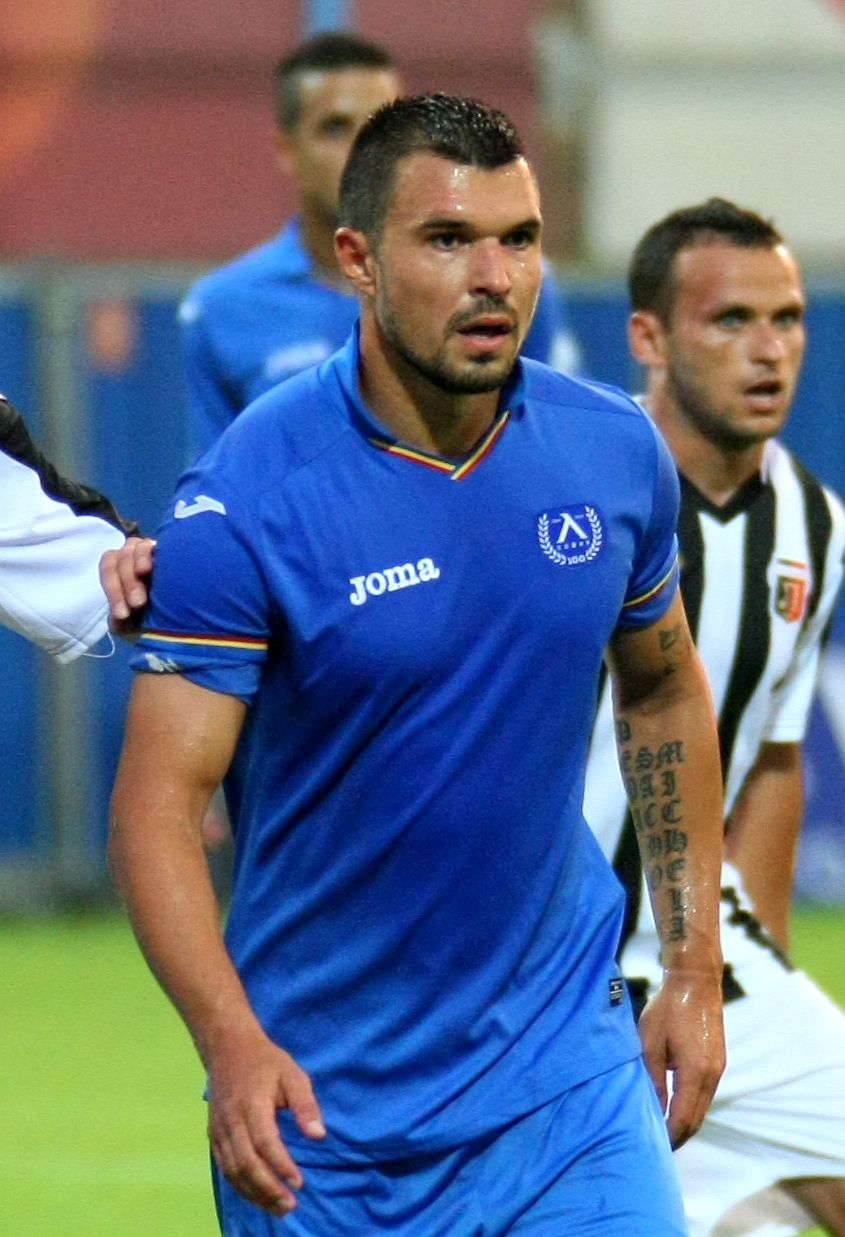
- Bojinov with Levski in 2014

Personal information
- Full name: Valeri Emilov Bojinov
- Date of birth: 15 February 1986 (age 40)
- Place of birth: Gorna Oryahovitsa, Bulgaria
- Height: 1.78 m (5 ft 10 in)
- Position: Striker

Youth career
- Maritsa Plovdiv
- Lokomotiv Sofia
- Dobrudzha Dobrich
- 1998–2000: Pietà Hotspurs
- 2000–2002: Lecce

Senior career*
Years	Team	Apps	(Gls)
2002–2005	Lecce	65	(16)
2005–2007	Fiorentina	36	(8)
2006–2007	→ Juventus (loan)	18	(5)
2007–2010	Manchester City	11	(1)
2009–2010	→ Parma (loan)	30	(8)
2010–2011	Parma	31	(3)
2011–2013	Sporting CP	8	(2)
2012	→ Lecce (loan)	10	(1)
2012	→ Verona (loan)	13	(1)
2013	→ Vicenza (loan)	18	(4)
2014	Levski Sofia	19	(7)
2014–2015	Ternana	27	(6)
2015–2017	Partizan	51	(23)
2017	Meizhou Hakka	13	(3)
2017	Lausanne	7	(0)
2018	Rijeka	1	(0)
2018	Botev Vratsa	11	(7)
2019	Levski Sofia	11	(4)
2019	Botev Vratsa	9	(0)
2020	Pescara	3	(0)
2020–2021	Levski Sofia	12	(1)
2022	Septemvri Sofia	12	(1)
2023	Vitosha Bistritsa	6	(1)
2023–2024	Kostenets	1	(4)

International career
2004–2015	Bulgaria	43	(6)

Managerial career
- 2022: Septemvri Sofia (assistant)
- 2023: Dobrudzha Dobrich (assistant)
- 2025: Sevlievo (sports director)
- * Club domestic league appearances and goals

Valeri Emilov Bojinov (Bulgarian: Валери Емилов Божинов, pronounced [vɐˈlɛri ɛˈmiɫof boˈʒinof]; born 15 February 1986) is a Bulgarian former professional footballer who played as a striker. He played for eighteen different clubs during his various spells in Italy, as well as in England, Portugal, Bulgaria, Serbia, Croatia, China and Switzerland. At international level, he also played for the Bulgaria national team. His surname is sometimes transliterated as Bozhinov.

== Biography ==
Born in Gorna Oryahovitsa, Bulgaria, Bojinov moved to Malta at the age of 12 with his mother Pepa, a former Bulgaria women's national football team player, and stepfather Sasho Angelov, who had played for the Bulgaria national football team during the 1990s.

Bojinov was discovered at the age of 14 by Lecce sports director Pantaleo Corvino while playing for Pietà Hotspurs, and signed for just 30,000,000 ITL (around €15,000).

== Club career ==
=== Lecce ===
Bojinov settled in the city of Lecce and continued his studies there while playing for Lecce's youth teams. He debuted in the Italian Serie A on 27 January 2002 at the age of 15 years and 11 months, becoming the youngest foreign player to make an appearance at the top level of Italian football. He scored his first goal in the top division on 6 January 2004 in a 2–1 home defeat against Bologna, becoming the youngest non-national to score in Serie A.

=== Fiorentina ===
Bojinov was acquired by Fiorentina in January 2005. He made his club debut against Palermo, playing the full match on 2 February 2005. On 26 February 2005, he scored his first goal for Fiorentina, against Udinese. On 8 May 2005, Bojinov scored a winning goal in 79th minute against Chievo at Stadio Marc'Antonio Bentegodi in 2–1 away win. During the 2004–05 season, Bojinov has played a total of nine matches, scoring two goals.

=== Juventus ===
For the 2006–07 season, Fiorentina loaned Bojinov to Juventus, which had just been relegated to Serie B.

=== Manchester City ===
On 3 August 2007, it was reported that Bojinov had completed his move to English Premier League club Manchester City, signing a four-year contract in an undisclosed fee deal. On 11 August 2007, he made his debut for the club in a 2–0 away win against West Ham United at the Boleyn Ground, entering as a substitute for Rolando Bianchi in the 60th minute in league play.

Bojinov was ruled out of action for five months after he suffered a knee ligament injury against Manchester United in August 2007. He returned to full training on 22 January 2008, scoring five goals in a bounce game. On 11 February 2008, Bojinov played in a Manchester City reserve game, where he came on as a substitute and scored a header from a cross by Émile Mpenza. Manchester City manager Sven-Göran Eriksson told Bojinov that he would not be ready to play in the game against Everton on 25 February 2008. He did not manage to make a comeback to the first-team squad in the 2007–08 season, but he did make some appearances for the reserve squad and was included in City's tour of Asia.

Bojinov scored his first goal for the club in over a year in a pre-season friendly against Stockport County. He also scored the winning goal in a friendly against Milan on 9 August 2008. On 17 August 2008, Bojinov was ruled out for six months after suffering an Achilles injury as he was running on to the pitch to warm up against Aston Villa.

In mid-February 2009, Manchester City manager Mark Hughes declared that Bojinov was going to play a practice match "behind closed doors", as he was nearing his return to first-team football. He played 65 minutes for the reserves on 17 February 2009. He even scored a penalty against rivals Manchester United in a reserve game while regaining match fitness.

Bojinov made his return to Premier League football by coming on as an 89th-minute substitute against West Ham on 1 March 2009. He then appeared again as a late substitute for Manchester City by entering as an 83rd-minute substitute for Elano against Aston Villa. Bojinov made his first start since 2007 in a 1–0 home win over Sunderland on 22 March 2009, but was substituted in the 65th minute for the return of injured Craig Bellamy. He scored his first league goal in the 2–1 loss against Tottenham Hotspur on 16 May 2009, four minutes after coming on as a substitute for compatriot Martin Petrov in the 61st minute away at White Hart Lane.

=== Parma ===
It was announced on 29 July 2009 that Bojinov would be joining Italian side Parma on a season-long loan deal. He decided to wear number 86. On 23 September 2009 he scored his first official goal for Parma against Lazio at Stadio Olimpico. He also won a penalty for his team; the match ended in a 2–1 away win. On 24 March 2010, Bojinov scored against Milan in 90th minute in 1–0 home win. During the 2009–10 season, Bojinov played 31 matches in all competitions, scoring eight goals.

On 4 July 2010, it was confirmed that Parma had completed the permanent signing of Bojinov. However, Bojinov endured a difficult season, largely restricted to the bench thanks to a combination of his own sub-par performances; the regular use of just one forward in the team; and regular goals coming from Hernán Crespo and Amauri in the early and late parts of the season, respectively.

=== Sporting CP ===
On 6 July 2011, Portuguese side Sporting CP signed Bojinov on a five-year contract, paying €2.6million for 80% of his registration rights, which could have risen to €3.5 million depending on his performances. His transfer to Sporting saw Chilean midfielder Jaime Valdés move on loan to Parma as part of the exchange.

During his time with the Lisbon outfit, he was primarily used by coach Domingos Paciência as a substitute. He made his first-team debut on 25 August against Danish side Nordsjælland in a UEFA Europa League play-off tie. He would score for Sporting for the first time on 24 October against Gil Vicente. A brace against the Barcelos side saw Bojinov help his side demolish the opposition 6–1 in a gameweek eight Primeira Liga fixture.

On 20 January 2012, Sporting declared Bojinov persona non-grata, forbidding the player from entering the stadium or the training academy, due to his actions in a Taça da Liga match against Moreirense played the previous day. At 92 minutes, Sporting was conceded a decisive penalty kick that would, if scored, give the team the victory. The regular penalty taker for Sporting, Matías Fernández, prepared to take the shot, but Bojinov took the ball from him, pushing him away and insisting that he would take the shot, despite him having never taken a penalty for Sporting, nor having scored a penalty in an official game since 2006. He failed to score, infuriating the supporters and Sporting's managers, who subsequently banned Bojinov on the basis that he disrespected the decision of the coach and therefore the rules of the club. He then joined his former club Lecce on a loan deal.

==== Loan spells to Verona and Vicenza ====
On 31 August 2012, it was announced that Bojinov became an official Verona player, joining on a year-long loan deal. On 17 January 2013, however, he signed with second-division side Vicenza on a separate six-month loan deal. He scored his first goal in his second game for Vicenza against Juve Stabia on 2 February. Bojinov would score again on 26 February, a brace against Grosseto in a 2–1 away win.

On 6 September 2013, the contract between Bojinov and Sporting was terminated.

=== Levski Sofia ===
On the last day of January 2014, it was confirmed that Bojinov had signed with Bulgarian side Levski Sofia, the first time in his career he would play for a club in his home country. He scored a goal on his unofficial debut on 7 February in a 4–2 loss in a friendly match against Czech side Teplice. Bojinov netted his first goal in an official match on 12 March in a 3–1 win over Botev Plovdiv in a Bulgarian Cup game. On 11 May 2014, Bojinov scored two goals in the 3–2 home loss against champions Ludogorets Razgrad.

=== Ternana ===
In September 2014, Bojinov cancelled his contract with Levski and joined Italian Serie B side Ternana as a free agent on a one-year contract. He made his debut against Bologna on 23 September, playing the full 90 minutes. On 4 November, against Virtus Entella at the Stadio Comunale, Bojinov scored his first goal for Ternana with a 49th-minute equaliser in a 2–1 loss. On 17 January 2015, Bojinov scored a brace in 2–1 home win over Crotone; the second goal was a fantastic 40-meter strike.

=== Partizan ===
On 14 June 2015, Bojinov signed a two-year contract with Serbian team Partizan. Former Partizan player and Bulgarian international Ivan Ivanov recommended Partizan to Bojinov. Bojinov took number 86 on the jersey and said that it was his lucky number and chose to wear it on the jersey. He made his official debut for the club in a second qualifying round UEFA Champions League against Dila Gori on 14 July 2015. In the match, he spent 77 minutes on the field without scoring. On 17 July 2015, against Metalac, Bojinov scored his first goal for Partizan. In that match, he scored one goal and had two assists in a 4–0 home win. On 25 July 2015, Bojinov scored twice against Jagodina in a 6–0 home win.

On 22 October 2015, Bojinov was in the starting XI against Athletic Bilbao in his first time 2015–16 UEFA Europa League group stage. On 13 December 2015, Bojinov entered the game as a substitute for Ivan Šaponjić in the 59th minute and scored a brace against Rad. In the winter of 2016, Partizan declined separate €2 million offers from both Sporting de Gijón and Rayo Vallecano for Bojinov. In January 2016, during an interview, he promised to any teammate who would assist one of his goals that he would give them €500.

On 17 February 2017, he terminated his contract with Partizan by mutual consent.

=== Meizhou Hakka ===
In March 2017 he signed with Chinese second-level club Meizhou Hakka.

=== Lausanne ===
In July 2017, Bojinov signed a two-year contract with Swiss side Lausanne; however, in October, he cancelled his contract with the club.

=== Rijeka ===
In February 2018, Bojinov signed for Rijeka in Croatia as a free agent. He was initially signed until June 2018 with an extension option. He made his official debut for the club in the semi-final of the 2017–18 Croatian Football Cup against Dinamo Zagreb on 4 April 2018, coming on as a substitute in the 78th minute. In his league debut against Inter Zaprešić on 8 May 2018, Bojinov came on as a substitute in the 76th minute and within three minutes on the field made an assist for Rijeka's fifth goal. On 5 June 2018, Bojinov's contract was extended for another season. On 20 August 2018, HNK Rijeka and Bojinov mutually agreed to terminate his contract with the club.

=== Return to Bulgaria ===
Bojinov played for Levski Sofia during the spring of 2019, scoring the decisive playoff goal against Etar that helped the team qualify for the UEFA Europa League. His time at the "bluemen" was sandwiched between two spells with Botev Vratsa - one in the second half of 2018, during which he established himself as an important player for the club, and a short, disappointing stint in the autumn of 2019.

=== Pescara ===
In February 2020, Bojinov joined Serie B club Pescara. On 23 February 2020, he was sent off before being able to make his debut (while sitting on the substitutes' bench against Crotone) by the match referee for insulting language. He appeared for the first time in an official match on 4 March, after coming on as a second-half substitute in the 2–0 away loss against Spezia.

=== Third spell at Levski Sofia ===
In September 2020, Bojinov rejoined Levski Sofia for the third time in his career. Although he did not play regularly, he became fan favorite due to his dedication to the club and his leadership qualities. On 21 October 2020, he scored his first goal of the season in his first start since his return against Partizan Cherven Bryag in the Round of 32 of the Bulgarian Cup. On 23 May 2021, he scored the winning goal against Cherno More. On 16 July 2021, his contract with the team was extended for one more season.

== Managerial career ==
On 25 June 2022 Bojinov was announced as the new assistant manager to Slavko Matić at Septemvri Sofia while still playing for the club.

== International career ==
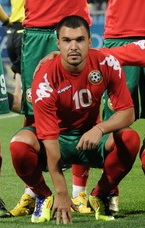
Bojinov playing for Bulgaria in October 2011

Bojinov made his debut for Bulgaria at UEFA Euro 2004; on 22 June 2004, he came on as a substitute in the 1–2 loss against Italy. He earned his second cap on 19 August 2004 in the 1–1 away draw against the Republic of Ireland in a friendly match during which he also scored his first international goal.

On 17 November 2005, Bojinov scored a goal against Mexico in a friendly match in the United States at NRG Stadium, contributing to a 3–0 win. On 6 September 2006, Bojinov scored his first international goal in a competition match, against Slovenia, in 3–0 home win in UEFA Euro 2008 qualifying. It was also Bulgaria's first goal in the Euro 2008 qualifying.

== Style of play ==
Considered to be a promising prospect in his youth, Bojinov is known for his abilities as a striker, and is capable of play with either foot, which has enabled him to play positions as a second striker, or winger on either flank, as well as in the centre of the pitch. He was also known for his speed over short distances, agility, and acceleration, as well close control in limited spaces. He has also garnered a reputation throughout his career for being inconsistent.

== Personal life ==
Bojinov dated Bulgarian singer Alisia. On 12 September 2007, he became father of a baby son. His son is also named Valeri. He was married to Bulgarian Playboy Playmate Nikoleta Lozanova from 2011 to 2015.

== Literature ==
- Il bulgaro che fu re di Parma per un giorno (The Bulgarian who was king of Parma for a day), by Luca Farinotti, Parma, Diabasis, 2019, Anthology Parma The Capital of Culture 2020. ISBN 978-88-8103-948-7. The novel of the true story of Hernán Crespo's farewell football match has Valeri Bojinov as its hero; after an incredible game, with a crazy action at last second, he manages to give the assist to Crespo for his last career goal. The Tardini Stadium blows up and Bojinov is forever remembered in Parma.

== Career statistics ==
=== Club ===
Appearances and goals by club, season and competition
Club	Season	League			National cup		League cup		Europe		Total	
Club	Season	Division	Apps	Goals	Apps	Goals	Apps	Goals	Apps	Goals	Apps	Goals
Lecce	2001–02	Serie A	2	0	0	0	—		—		2	0
Lecce	2002–03	Serie B	15	2	0	0	—		—		15	2
Lecce	2003–04	Serie A	28	3	0	0	—		—		28	3
Lecce	2004–05	Serie A	20	11	3	3	—		—		23	14
Lecce	Total		65	16	3	3	—		—		68	19
Fiorentina	2004–05	Serie A	9	2	0	0	—		—		9	2
Fiorentina	2005–06	Serie A	27	6	5	3	—		—		32	9
Fiorentina	Total		36	8	5	3	—		—		41	11
Juventus (loan)	2006–07	Serie B	18	5	3	2	—		—		21	7
Manchester City	2007–08	Premier League	3	0	0	0	0	0	0	0	3	0
Manchester City	2008–09	Premier League	8	1	0	0	0	0	1	0	9	1
Manchester City	Total		11	1	0	0	0	0	1	0	12	1
Parma (loan)	2009–10	Serie A	30	8	1	0	—		—		31	8
Parma	2010–11	Serie A	31	3	2	0	—		—		33	3
Sporting CP	2011–12	Primeira Liga	8	2	2	0	1	0	5	1	16	3
Lecce (loan)	2011–12	Serie A	10	1	0	0	—		—		10	1
Verona (loan)	2012–13	Serie B	13	1	2	0	—		—		15	1
Vicenza (loan)	2012–13	Serie B	18	4	0	0	—		—		18	4
Levski Sofia	2013–14	Bulgarian First League	14	6	1	1	—		0	0	15	7
Levski Sofia	2014–15	Bulgarian First League	5	1	0	0	—		—		5	1
Levski Sofia	Total		19	7	1	1	—		0	0	20	8
Ternana	2014–15	Serie B	27	6	0	0	—		—		27	6
Partizan	2015–16	Serbian SuperLiga	31	18	4	0	—		10	0	45	18
Partizan	2016–17	Serbian SuperLiga	20	5	1	2	—		1	0	22	7
Partizan	Total		51	23	5	2	—		11	0	67	25
Meizhou Hakka	2017	China League One	13	3	0	0	—		—		13	3
Lausanne	2017–18	Swiss Super League	7	0	2	1	—		—		9	1
Rijeka	2017–18	1. HNL	1	0	1	0	—		0	0	2	0
Botev Vratsa	2018–19	Bulgarian First League	11	7	1	0	—		—		12	7
Levski Sofia	2018–19	Bulgarian First League	11	4	0	0	—		0	0	11	4
Botev Vratsa	2019–20	Bulgarian First League	9	0	2	0	—		—		11	0
Pescara	2019–20	Serie B	3	0	0	0	—		—		3	0
Levski Sofia	2020–21	Bulgarian First League	10	1	1	1	—		0	0	11	2
Levski Sofia	2021–22	Bulgarian First League	2	0	0	0	—		—		2	0
Levski Sofia	Total		12	1	1	1	—		0	0	13	2
Septemvri Sofia	2021–22	Bulgarian Second Professional Football League	12	1	0	0	—		—		12	1
Vitosha Bistritsa	2022–23	Bulgarian Second Professional Football League	6	1	0	0	—		—		6	1
Career total			422	102	31	13	1	0	17	1	471	116

=== International ===
Appearances and goals by national team and year
National team	Year	Apps	Goals
Bulgaria	2004	6	1
Bulgaria	2005	5	1
Bulgaria	2006	6	1
Bulgaria	2007	3	0
Bulgaria	2008	0	0
Bulgaria	2009	6	1
Bulgaria	2010	7	1
Bulgaria	2011	2	0
Bulgaria	2012	5	1
Bulgaria	2013	2	0
Bulgaria	2014	0	0
Bulgaria	2015	1	0
Total		43	6

Scores and results list Bulgaria's goal tally first, score column indicates score after each Bojinov goal.

List of international goals scored by Valeri Bojinov
No.	Date	Venue	Opponent	Score	Result	Competition
1	18 August 2004	Lansdowne Road, Dublin, Republic of Ireland	Republic of Ireland	1–1	1–1	Friendly
2	17 November 2005	Reliant Stadium, Houston, United States	Mexico	2–0	3–0	Friendly
3	6 September 2006	Vasil Levski, Sofia, Bulgaria	Slovenia	1–0	3–0	UEFA Euro 2008 qualifying
4	18 November 2009	Hibernians Ground, Paola, Malta	Malta	1–0	4–1	Friendly
5	24 May 2010	Orlando Stadium, Johannesburg, South Africa	South Africa	1–1	1–1	Friendly
6	29 February 2012	ETO Park, Győr, Hungary	Hungary	1–1	1–1	Friendly

== Honours ==
Juventus

- Serie B: 2006–07

Partizan

- Serbian SuperLiga: 2016–17
- Serbian Cup (2): 2015–16, 2016–17
