= Dino Bovoli =

Italian footballer and coach (1914-1988)

Personal information
- Date of birth: April 4, 1914
- Place of birth: Molinella, Italy
- Date of death: March 13, 1988 (aged 73)
- Position: Defender

Senior career*
Years	Team	Apps	(Gls)
1932–1934	Molinella		
1934–1938	Rimini	98	(2)
1938–1939	Pro Vercelli	28	(0)
1939–1941	Atalanta	54	(1)
1941–1945	Ambrosiana-Inter	87	(0)
1945–1946	Andrea Doria	21	(0)
1946–1947	Sampdoria	3	(0)
1947–1951	Siracusa	119	(1)

Managerial career
- 1952–1953: Siracusa
- 1953–1955: Toma Maglie
- 1956–1960: Barletta
- 1960–1962: Lecce
- 1962–1963: Siena
- 1963–1964: L'Aquila
- 1965–1967: Acireale
- 1967–1968: Nardò
- 1971–1976: Acireale
- * Club domestic league appearances and goals

Dino Bovoli (April 4, 1914 – March 13, 1988) was an Italian professional football player and coach.
