= Andrea Bondioli =

Italian footballer (born 1997)

Personal information
- Date of birth: 21 February 1997 (age 29)
- Place of birth: Brescia, Italy
- Height: 1.84 m (6 ft 0 in)
- Position: Defender

Team information
- Current team: L'Aquila

Youth career
- –2014: Internazionale
- 2012–2014: → Brescia (loan)
- 2014–2016: Brescia

Senior career*
Years	Team	Apps	(Gls)
2016–2017	Maceratese	7	(0)
2017–2019	Santarcangelo	52	(4)
2019–2022	Legnago Salus	89	(6)
2022–2024	Fiorenzuola	49	(3)
2024–2026	Vado	34	(1)
2026–	L'Aquila	0	(0)
- * Club domestic league appearances and goals as of 25 June 2026

Andrea Bondioli (born 21 February 1997) is an Italian professional footballer who plays as a defender for Serie D club L'Aquila.

== Club career ==
Formed on the Internazionale youth system, Bondioli was loaned to Brescia Primavera on 2012, and joined permanently in 2014.

On 8 July 2019, he joined Legnago Salus.

On 29 July 2020, he renewed his contract with the club.

On 1 June 2022, Bondioli signed a contract with Fiorenzuola until June 2024.
