= Nenad Tomović =

Serbian footballer

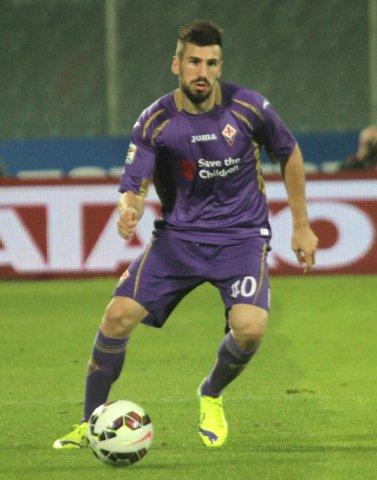
- Tomović playing for Fiorentina in 2014

Personal information
- Date of birth: 30 August 1987 (age 39)
- Place of birth: Kragujevac, SFR Yugoslavia
- Height: 1.83 m (6 ft 0 in)
- Position: Centre-back

Team information
- Current team: Čukarički
- Number: 4

Youth career
- Radnički Kragujevac
- 2003–2005: Rad
- 2006: Red Star Belgrade

Senior career*
Years	Team	Apps	(Gls)
2005	Rad	9	(0)
2006–2009	Red Star Belgrade	40	(1)
2006–2007	→ Rad (loan)	38	(2)
2009–2012	Genoa	14	(0)
2011–2012	→ Lecce (loan)	49	(1)
2012–2017	Fiorentina	127	(1)
2017–2019	Chievo	37	(1)
2019–2020	→ SPAL (loan)	23	(0)
2020–2021	SPAL	33	(1)
2021–2024	AEK Larnaca	75	(0)
2024–2025	Nea Salamis	30	(0)
2025–	Čukarički	29	(1)

International career^{‡}
2008–2015	Serbia	22	(0)
- * Club domestic league appearances and goals as of 10 June 2026 ‡ National team caps and goals as of 28 May 2019

Nenad Tomović (Serbian Cyrillic: Ненад Томовић; born 30 August 1987) is a Serbian professional footballer who plays as a centre-back for Čukarički.

A former Serbian Olympian and U21 international, Tomović made 22 appearances for Serbia at full level between 2008 and 2015.

== Club career ==
=== Career in Serbia ===
Born in Kragujevac, Tomović started out at hometown club Radnički. He joined the youth categories of Rad in 2003, alongside Nemanja Pejčinović. In early 2005, Tomović was promoted to the first-team squad, making his first senior appearances during the 2004–05 Serbian Second League.

In January 2006, Tomović was acquired by Red Star Belgrade, alongside Vladan Milosavljev. He subsequently played for the youth team at the 2006 Torneo di Viareggio, before making one senior appearance near the end of the 2005–06 Serbia and Montenegro SuperLiga, as the club won the title. In the summer of 2006, Tomović was loaned back to Rad. He spent one and a half seasons with the Građevinari, before returning to Red Star Belgrade in the 2008 winter transfer window.

=== Career in Italy ===
In July 2009, Tomović was officially transferred to Italian club Genoa. He made 19 appearances in all competitions throughout his debut season with the Rossoblù. In the 2011 winter transfer window, Tomović was loaned to Lecce for the remainder of the season. His loan was extended for a further year in June 2011.

On 31 August 2012, Tomović joined Fiorentina in a co-ownership deal with Juan Manuel Vargas moving in the opposite direction. He featured regularly in central defence and at right-back, as the Viola purchased the other half of his rights from Genoa at the end of the season.

On 31 August 2017, Tomović joined Chievo on a season-long loan with an option to buy.

On 24 August 2019, Tomović joined Serie A club SPAL on loan with an obligation to buy.

=== Career in Cyprus ===
On 11 August 2022, AEK Larnaca (with Tomović on the team) played the second leg of the 2022–23 UEFA Europa League third qualifying round away in Belgrade against Partizan. After the match, Tomović ran to the sidelines and pushed a local photojournalist to the ground. UEFA's Control, Ethics and Disciplinary Body is yet to discuss this case.

== International career ==
Tomović represented Serbia and Montenegro at the 2005 UEFA European Under-19 Championship. He was subsequently a member of the Serbia squad at the 2008 Summer Olympics. The following year, Tomović represented Serbia at the 2009 UEFA European Under-21 Championship.

Tomović made his full international debut for Serbia on 14 December 2008, playing the full 90 minutes in a 1–0 friendly loss against Poland in Antalya in a squad made up of mainly domestic-based players.

After a 2014 World Cup qualifier against Macedonia on 15 October 2013, an image of completely naked Tomović, accompanied by Filip Đorđević and Aleksandar Kolarov, leaked after a fan sneaked into the dressing room.

== Career statistics ==
=== Club ===
As of match played 21 May 2024

Appearances and goals by club, season and competition
Club	Season	League			National cup		Continental		Other		Total	
Club	Season	Division	Apps	Goals	Apps	Goals	Apps	Goals	Apps	Goals	Apps	Goals
Rad	2004–05	Serbian Second League	9	0			—		—		9	0
Rad	2005–06	Serbia and Montenegro SuperLiga	0	0			—		—		0	0
Rad	Total		9	0			—		—		9	0
Red Star Belgrade	2005–06	Serbia and Montenegro SuperLiga	1	0	0	0	0	0	—		1	0
Red Star Belgrade	2007–08	Serbian SuperLiga	12	0	3	0	0	0	—		15	0
Red Star Belgrade	2008–09	Serbian SuperLiga	27	1	3	0	1 (Note: Appearances in UEFA Europa League)	0	—		31	1
Red Star Belgrade	Total		40	1	6	0	1	0	—		47	1
Rad (loan)	2006–07	Serbian First League	28	1			—		1 (Note: Appearances in Serbian First League playoffs)	0	29	1
Rad (loan)	2007–08	Serbian First League	10	1	1	0	—		0	0	11	1
Rad (loan)	Total		38	2	1	0	—		1	0	40	2
Genoa	2009–10	Serie A	14	0	1	0	4	0	—		19	0
Genoa	2010–11	Serie A	0	0	2	0	—		—		2	0
Genoa	2012–13	Serie A	0	0	1	0	—		—		1	0
Genoa	Total		14	0	4	0	4	0	—		22	0
Lecce (loan)	2010–11	Serie A	16	0	0	0	—		—		16	0
Lecce (loan)	2011–12	Serie A	33	1	1	0	—		—		34	1
Lecce (loan)	Total		49	1	1	0	—		—		50	1
Fiorentina	2012–13	Serie A	26	0	3	0	—		—		29	0
Fiorentina	2013–14	Serie A	25	0	2	0	8	0	—		35	0
Fiorentina	2014–15	Serie A	24	1	2	0	11	0	—		37	1
Fiorentina	2015–16	Serie A	24	0	1	0	8	0	—		33	0
Fiorentina	2016–17	Serie A	26	0	2	0	7	0	—		35	0
Fiorentina	2017–18	Serie A	2	0	0	0	—		—		2	0
Fiorentina	Total		127	1	10	0	34	0	—		171	1
Chievo (loan)	2017–18	Serie A	27	0	0	0	—		—		27	0
Chievo	2018–19	Serie A	10	1	1	0	—		—		11	1
SPAL (loan)	2019–20	Serie A	23	0	2	0	—		—		25	0
SPAL	2020–21	Serie A	33	1	4	0	—		—		37	1
AEK Larnaca	2021–22	Cypriot First Division	27	0	7	3	—		—		34	3
AEK Larnaca	2022–23	Cypriot First Division	27	0	0	0	14	0	—		41	0
AEK Larnaca	2023–24	Cypriot First Division	21	0	2	0	4	0	—		27	0
AEK Larnaca	Total		75	0	9	3	18	0	—		102	3
Career total			445	7	38	3	57	0	1	0	541	10

=== International ===
Appearances and goals by national team and year
National team	Year	Apps	Goals
Serbia	2008	1	0
Serbia	2009	1	0
Serbia	2010	0	0
Serbia	2011	7	0
Serbia	2012	2	0
Serbia	2013	4	0
Serbia	2014	1	0
Serbia	2015	6	0
Total		22	0

== Honours ==
Red Star Belgrade

- First League of Serbia and Montenegro: 2005–06
- Serbia and Montenegro Cup: 2005–06

Fiorentina

- Coppa Italia runner-up: 2013–14
