= Pietro Antonio Bondioli =

Greek-Italian physician and philosopher

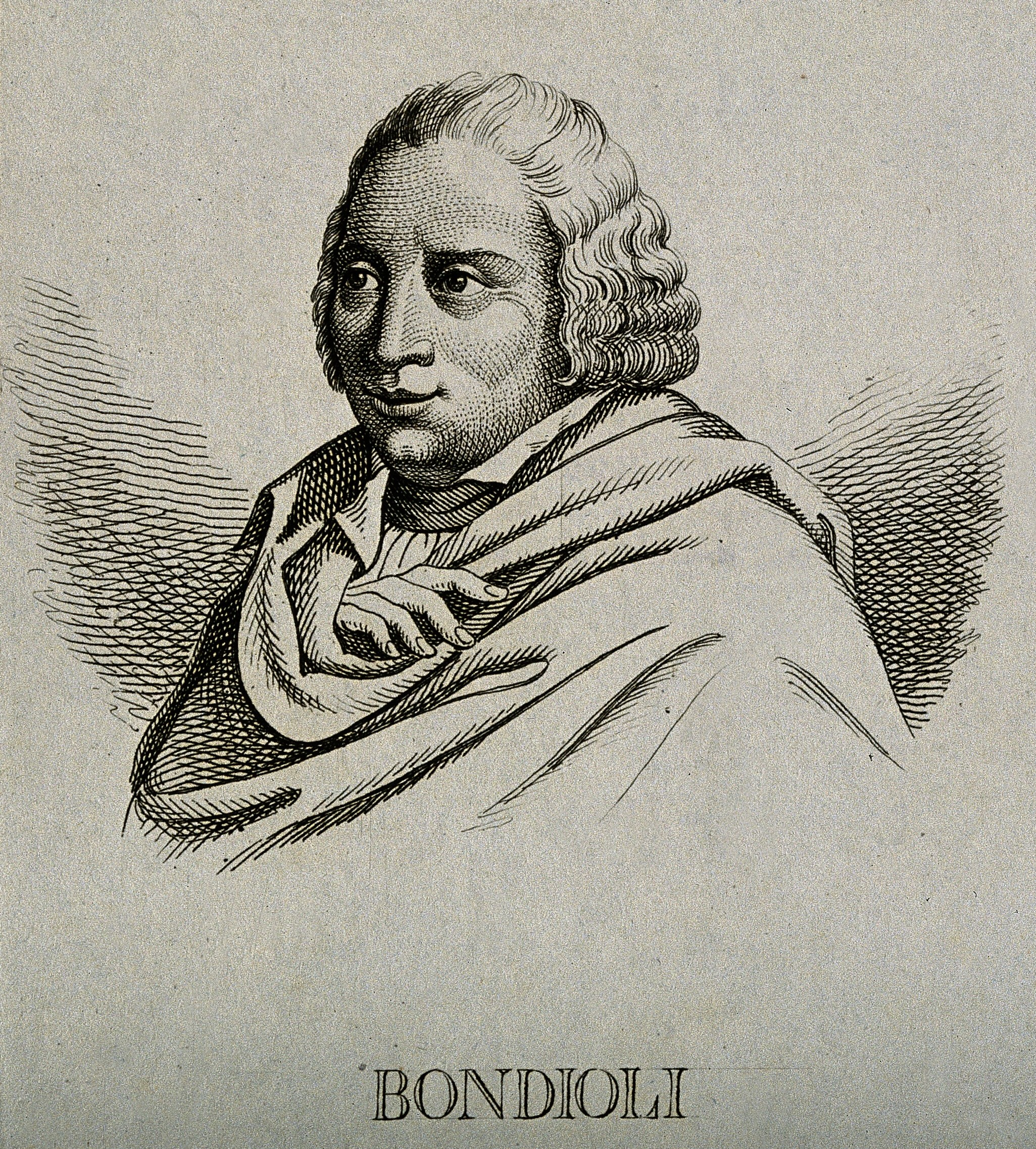

Peter Anton Bondioli or Pietro Antonio Bondioli (1765 – 26 September 1808) was a Greek-Italian physician and natural philosopher. He wrote on medicine, friction and electricity.

Bondioli was born on the island of Corfu to Giacomo and Chiara Marsili. He moved to study at the Greek College in Padua and received a medical degree in 1789. He then practiced in Venice and travelled to Constantinople with the Venetian ambassador. He then worked in Paris and moved to serve in the Italian army as a physician during the Battle of Marengo (1800). He became a professor of materia medica at the University of Bologna in 1803. In 1806 he succeeded A. Comparetti to the position of professor of clinical medicine at the University of Padua and in 1808 he was appointed elector to the Collegio dei Dotti in Bologna but died before taking it up. Bondioli wrote a on a wide range of topics such as the use of friction and electricity in medicine. He also wrote on sound, the phenomenon of the aurora borealis, the latter being noted by Alessandro Volta. He also wrote several anatomical and medical treatises including L’esistenza della vaginale commune del testicolo (1789–1790).
