= Cristian Silvestri =

Italian footballer (born 1975)

Personal information
- Date of birth: January 21, 1975 (age 51)
- Place of birth: Rome, Italy
- Height: 6 ft 0 in (1.83 m)
- Position: Defender

Senior career*
Years	Team	Apps	(Gls)
1995–1999	Ternana	84	(5)
1999–2001	Cosenza	48	(1)
2001–2005	Lecce	73	(0)
2005–2009	Catania	127	(6)
2009–2010	Ascoli Calcio	21	(0)
- * Club domestic league appearances and goals as of 22 June 2010

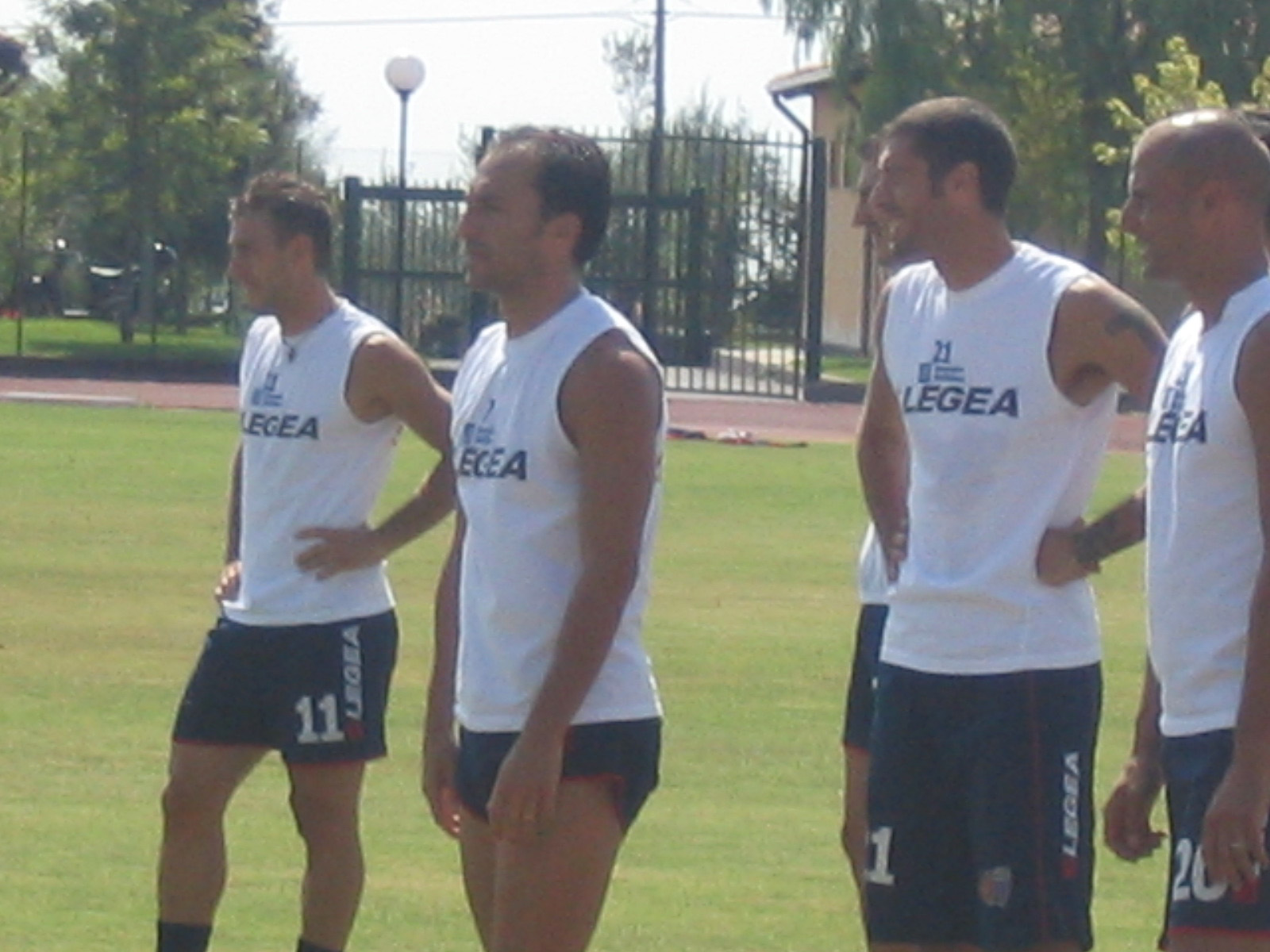
Christian Silvestri in the middle.

Cristian Silvestri (born January 21, 1975) is a retired Italian football defender.

== Career ==
=== Ternana Calcio ===
Silvestri began his professional career at the age of 20, after he was promoted from the youth system of Ternana Calcio in 1995. The player made a handful of appearances in his first season, and continued with the senior squad for 4 full seasons, and in his final two seasons with the club, Silvestri established himself as an undisputed starter and following the conclusion of the 1998–99 season, Silvestri had racked up over 100 appearances for his club in all competitions, scoring 6 goals. Following several positive seasons with Ternana Calcio, the fullback transferred to Cosenza Calcio in the summer of 1999.

=== Cosenza Calcio ===
In July 1999, Cosenza Calcio 1914, officially announced the signing of the 24-year-old defender, for an undisclosed transfer fee. In just two seasons with the third division club, Silvestri managed an impressive 54 appearances with 1 goal in all competitions. The players impressive form led to interest amongst several larger Italian clubs, including Serie A side, U.S. Lecce, who eventually signed the defender in the summer of 2001.

=== U.S. Lecce ===
The defender officially transferred to U.S. Lecce in the summer of 2001, and made his Serie A debut during that season. In his first Serie A season, the player managed to make 15 appearances in the league, while also taking part in a select Coppa Italia, and friendly matches. Silvestri could not, however, help the club avoid relegation to the Serie A, but he remained within the squad, despite their demotion. In his second season with the Apulian club, Silvestri was a starter for much of the Serie B season, and went on to make 35 starts for the club in the league. His efforts helped the club earn promotion back into the top flight after just one season in the second tier. In the club's return season, Silvesrti was dropped from the starting XI, and made just 15 league appearances. During the following campaign, Silvestri was far down in the pecking order and also was hampered by injuries throughout the first portion of the season. With this, he managed to make just 2 appearances during the first 4 months of the 2004–05 Serie A season. After a dismal start to the season, the fullback transferred to Sicilian side, Calcio Catania for the second half of the 2004–05 Serie B season.

=== Calcio Catania ===
Silvestri officially joined the Sicilian outfit in January 2005, during the winter transfer market. He instantly became a key part of the team's roster and made 18 appearances in the league scoring 2 goals in his first six months. Silvestri also was an influential part of the Catania first team during the 2005–06 Serie B season, as he helped the club to finish second in the league, and hence, earn promotion to the Italian Serie A. Cristian contributed with an impressive total of 36 league matches, also netting a single goal. Upon Catania's return to the Italian top flight, Silvestri continued to be an integral figure in the club's success. He manages 22 Serie A appearances and helped guide the team to a 13th-place finish in the league table. The 2007–08 season proved to be very similar, as the player contributed with 26 appearances, helping the team to avoid relegation yet again with a 17th-place finish in the league. During the 2008–09 Serie A campaign, Silvestri was often used as a left full back, as the right side was covered by Gennaro Sardo and later Alessandro Potenza. Silvestri still managed 23 appearances in the league, and the club wound up 15th in the final table. At the conclusion of the season, talk of a contract renewal was heard, but on June 30, 2009, Silvestri became a free agent at the age of 34. During his time with Catania he was known for being a hard worker and a so-called "wall" in defensive positions.

=== Ascoli Calcio ===
In July 2009, Silvestri signed a contract with Serie B side, Ascoli Calcio, following the expiration of his Catania deal. In his first season with the club, Silvestri made 21 appearances in the league, along with select appearances in the club's Coppa Italia campaign. Silvestri joined former Catania teammates, Marcello Gazzola, Mirco Antenucci, and Vito Falconieri at Ascoli. Gazzola and Falconieri are at Ascoli in co-ownership deal, whilst Antenucci was on loan.
