= Luigi Piangerelli =

Italian footballer

Personal information
- Full name: Luigi Piangerelli
- Date of birth: October 19, 1973 (age 53)
- Place of birth: Porto Recanati, Italy
- Height: 1.74 m (5 ft 9 in)
- Position: Midfielder

Youth career
- 1991–1992: Cesena

Senior career*
Years	Team	Apps	(Gls)
1992–1997	Cesena	144	(9)
1997–2003	Lecce	190	(5)
2004–2005	Fiorentina	38	(1)
2005–2007	Brescia	72	(3)
2007–2009	Triestina	44	(0)
2009–2011	Cesena	32	(0)
Total		520	(18)
- * Club domestic league appearances and goals

Luigi Piangerelli (born 19 October 1973 in Porto Recanati) is an Italian former football player.

He was a key player for A.C. Cesena at Serie B. After Cesena relegated, he joined Lecce, which newly promoted to Serie A.

In January 2004, he was signed by Fiorentina and returned to Cesena in 2009.

== Honours and awards ==
- Serie B promotion: Lecce (1999, 2003), Fiorentina (2004)
