= L'Aquila 1927 =

Italian football club

L'Aquila
- Full name: L'Aquila 1927
- Nicknames: Rossoblù (Red and blues)
- Founded: 1927; 1994 AS L’Aquila; 2004 L’Aquila Calcio; 2018 L’Aquila 1927
- Ground: Gran Sasso d'Italia-Italo Acconcia
- Capacity: 6,763
- Chairman: Stefano Baiocco
- Manager: Sandro Pochesci
- League: Serie D
- 2024–25: Serie D/F, 2nd
- Website: laquila1927.com
Home colours	Away colours	Third colours

L'Aquila 1927 is an Italian association football club located in L'Aquila, Abruzzo. They currently play in the Serie D.

== History ==
Existence of football clubs in L'Aquila can be traced back to 1915, when an amateur club called Football Club L'Aquila, then unregistered with the Italian Football Federation, already existed; in 1926, this club began using red and blue as their official colors. In 1927, a new club called Società Sportiva Città dell'Aquila was founded, but lasted only a few years. In September 1931, Associazione Sportiva L'Aquila was founded as local fascist sports organizations started playing in the locally organized Seconda Divisione. After two promotions, L'Aquila spent its first season in the second-tier Serie B. In 1936, a train accident on the Terni–Sulmona railway near Contigliano, Lazio seriously injured several of the team's players and left head coach Attilio Buratti dead. Later, the club did not manage to escape relegation and its Serie B tenure ended after three seasons.

In December 1937, L'Aquila played a Coppa Italia game against Juventus and lost by a three-goal margin, 4–1. The club spent a total of five consecutive seasons in third-tier Serie C before they were dismissed from play during World War II. In 1943, the club was refounded as Sportiva L'Aquila 1944 playing in Serie C three more seasons from 1945 to 1948. After spending several seasons in the lower tiered leagues, the club was readmitted to Serie C in 1958, where it spent a decade after being relegated to Serie D in 1969. The club won promotion to Serie C2 in 1979, though again, they were relegated to amateur football status in 1982.

In 1993, the club was readmitted to Serie C2 to fill a league vacancy, but the club fell through a year later due to bankruptcy. In 1994, Associazione Sportiva L'Aquila was founded and admitted to Eccellenza, and then became Vis L'Aquila in 1995 after a merger with Serie D squad Paganica Calcio. In 1998, the club won promotion to Serie C2, and reached Serie C1 in 2000 after winning a playoff against Acireale.

2004 edition

In 2004, the club was relegated back to Serie C2, only to fall through once again and readmitted to Eccellenza under their current name. Following the 2009 L'Aquila earthquake, the club was promoted to Serie D under deliberation of the Lega Nazionale Dilettanti after it was realized the club was unable to complete the remaining two games left in the season with the club sitting at the top of the division. In the 2009–10 season, the club was promoted from Serie D to the Lega Pro Seconda Divisione. Another promotion, this time to Lega Pro Prima Divisione, came through playoffs in 2012–13; this was followed by an impressive fifth place and subsequent qualification promotion playoff (then lost to Pisa). In the summer of 2015 it was penalized by a single point for sporting fraud.

After another bankruptcy, another club was created in 2018.

== Players ==
=== Notable former players ===
For all former players with a Wikipedia article, see Category:L'Aquila 1927 players

This list of former players includes those who received international caps, made significant contributions to the team in terms of appearances or goals while playing for the team, or who made significant contributions to the sport either before they played for the team, or after they left. It is clearly not yet complete and all inclusive, and additions and refinements will continue to be made over time.

- (Italy) Annibale Frossi (1935–1936)
- (Libya) Jehad Muntasser (2001–2002)
- (Italy) Giovanni Rosati (1979–1981)
- (Nigeria) Kenneth Zeigbo (2001–2002)

== Notable former managers ==
- (Italy) Ottavio Barbieri (1933–1934)
- (Hungary) András Kuttik (1936–1937)
- (Italy) Giovanni Degni (1954–1955)
- (Hungary) János Nehadoma (1957–1958)
- (Italy) Dino Bovoli (1963–1964)
- (Italy) Renato Benaglia (1972–1973)
- (Italy) Sergio Petrelli (1978–1979)
- (Italy) Leonardo Acori (1991–1992)
- (Venezuela) Bruno Nobili (1993–1994, 1995–1996)
- (Italy) Paolo Stringara (2000–2001)
- (Italy) Bruno Giordano (2002–2003)
