= Erminio Rullo =

Italian footballer (born 1984)

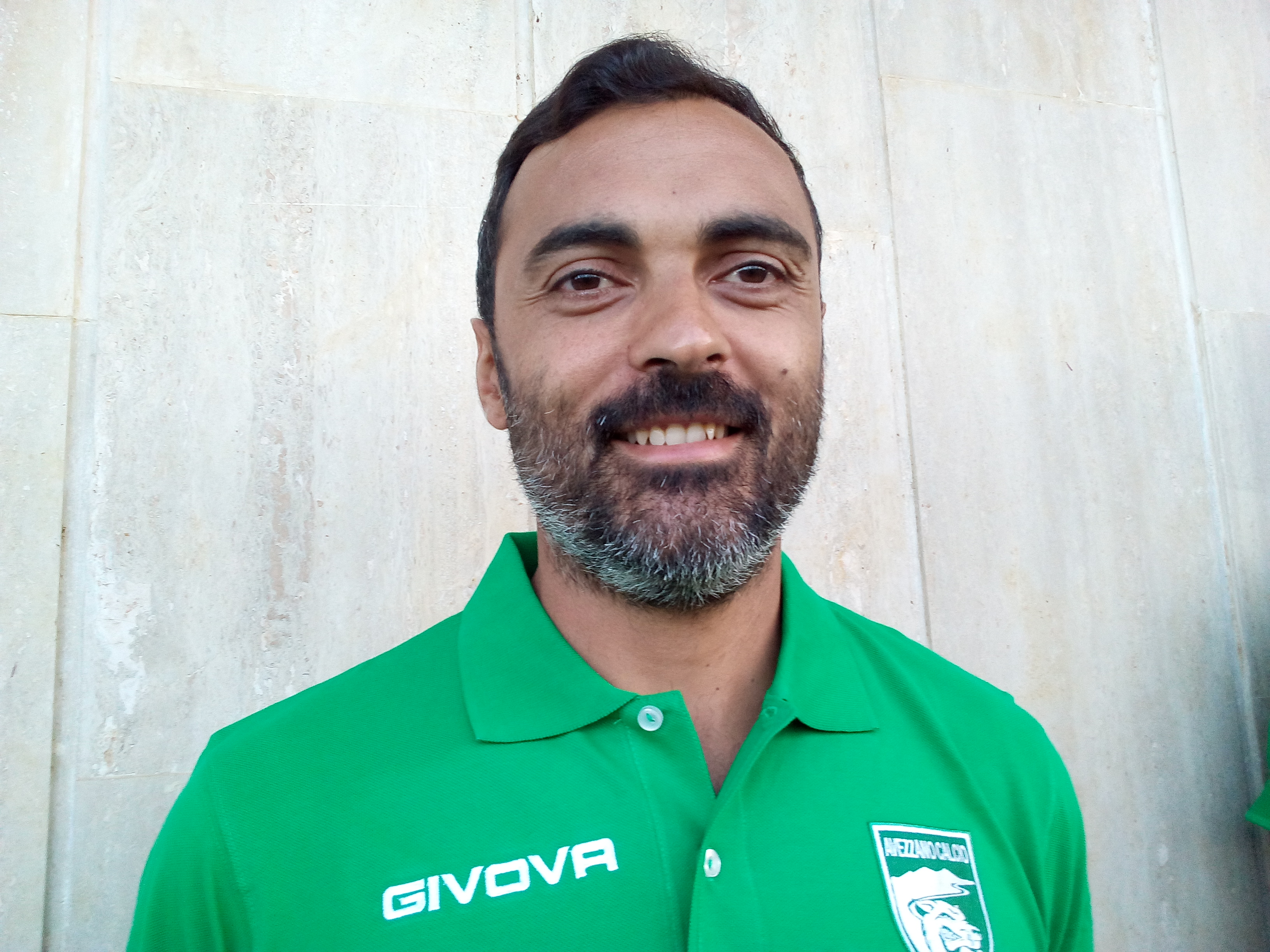
- Erminio Rullo Avezzano 2017

Personal information
- Date of birth: 19 February 1984 (age 42)
- Place of birth: Naples, Italy
- Height: 1.78 m (5 ft 10 in)
- Position: Centre back

Youth career
- Lecce
- 2001–2002: Internazionale
- 2002–2004: Lecce

Senior career*
Years	Team	Apps	(Gls)
2003–2007	Lecce	95	(1)
2007–2010	Napoli	12	(0)
2008–2009	→ Triestina (loan)	35	(0)
2011–2012	Modena	32	(0)
2013–2015	Lecce	9	(0)
2015	Messina	9	(0)
2015–2016	Martina Franca	8	(0)
2016–2017	Olympia Agnonese	23	(0)
2017	Avezzano	0	(0)
2017–2018	Olympia Agnonese	30	(0)

International career
2000	Italy U15	5	(1)
2003	Italy U20	2	(0)
2004	Italy U21	1	(0)

Managerial career
- 2019–2020: Olympia Agnonese
- 2020–2021: Avezzano
- * Club domestic league appearances and goals as of 24 October 2017

Erminio Rullo (born 19 February 1984) is an Italian former footballer who played as a centre back.

== Club career ==
=== Lecce ===
Born in Naples, Campania, Rullo started his career with Apulia side Lecce. He archived a record by winning three consecutive Campionato Nazionale Primavera between 2002 and 2004, two with Lecce and one with F.C. Internazionale Milano Primavera.

In June 2001 half of the registration rights of Rullo was acquired by Internazionale for 3,000 million lire (€1,549,371); At the same time half of the "card" of Giorgio Frezzolini was sold to Lecce for 2,500 million lire (€1,291,142), as well as half the "card" of Bruno Cirillo for 6,000 million lire. (€3,098,741) Rullo signed a 4-year contract. Rullo spent a season in Inter's reserve. He also sometimes featured as wing forward as the team had Giovanni Pasquale. In June 2002 Frezzolini joined Lecce for free, as well as Cirillo to Lecce for €306,000 and Rullo returned to Lecce for €151,000. The club failed to agree a price, through a mandatory bidding process, Lecce acquired Cirillo and Rullo.

Rullo made his Serie A debut on 31 August 2003 against Lazio, the opening match of 2003–04 Serie A. He started the match as winger along with Max Tonetto and Giuseppe Abruzzese in left back. He was substituted by Alessandro Budel at half time as the team already lost 0–3 away at that time. He started 4 more Serie A matches that season, 3 of them as winger.

In 2004–05 Serie A, Rullo ahead Abruzzese at the left back position, under new coach Zdeněk Zeman who replaced Delio Rossi. The team now featured only one right winger, Marco Cassetti, instead of 2 or even 3 in the last season, which also saw the departure of Tonetto.

Rullo followed Lecce relegated to Serie B in mid-2006.

=== Napoli ===
In January 2007 he left for fellow Serie B side Napoli for €1.5 million and Lecce signed Alberto Giuliatto from Treviso as replacement. Rullo signed a 4 1/2-year contract. Rullo worked as understudy of Mirko Savini that season and finished as runner-up and promoted to Serie A.

With Napoli at Serie A, Rullo remained as Savini's backup, despite wore no.3 shirt. On 26 June 2008 he was loaned to Serie B side Triestina. Napoli later signed Salvatore Aronica to feature as the new left central back or youth product Luigi Vitale (2ho took the no.3 shirt) as left wingback ahead Savini.

With Triestina, Rullo made 34 started out of possible 42 Serie B matches. In 2009–10 season, he returned to Napoli, and changed his shirt number to no.33 But Rullo remained as a backup player, which Roberto Donadoni and then Walter Mazzarri preferred Aronica (as left central back, left back or left wingback), Juan Camilo Zúñiga (left wingback, summer new signing) and Andrea Dossena (left wingback, winter new signing).

At the start of 2010–11 season, Napoli included Aronica, Dossena, Rullo and Zúñiga in the 25-men squad for 2010–11 UEFA Europa League qualifying (with several players left out), which also saw Rullo's shirt number changed again, this time to no.84 – the year of his birth (Matteo Gianello took his number). However, he did not receive a call-up to that qualifying match.

=== Modena ===
Rullo moved to Modena on 10 January 2011 on a free transfer.
