= Axel Cédric Konan =

Ivorian footballer

Personal information
- Full name: Haouliais Axel Cédric Konan
- Date of birth: 25 January 1983 (age 43)
- Place of birth: Abidjan, Ivory Coast
- Height: 1.83 m (6 ft 0 in)
- Position: Striker

Team information
- Current team: AC Bellinzona
- Number: 11

Youth career
- Lecce

Senior career*
Years	Team	Apps	(Gls)
2000–2009	Lecce	127	(22)
2006–2007	→ Torino (loan)	5	(0)
2010–	AC Bellinzona	17	(2)
- * Club domestic league appearances and goals as of May 10, 2009

Axel Cédric Konan (born 25 January 1983 in Abidjan) is an Ivorian footballer, who is currently contracted with Swiss Super League club AC Bellinzona.

== Career ==
Despite being born in Ivory Coast, he grew up into the youth system of Southern Italian club Lecce, making his senior debut in 2000. He played for Lecce from 2000 to 2009, except for a season loan to Torino in 2006–07.

When Konan's contract expired in June 2009, Lecce decided not to offer the Ivorian striker a new bid; he was subsequently unattached for an entire season (also failing a trial at Atalanta), before agreeing a one-year deal with Swiss club AC Bellinzona in November 2010.
