= Javier Chevantón =

Uruguayan footballer (born 1980)

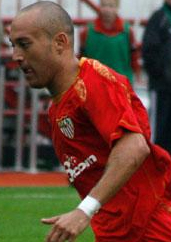
- Chevantón playing for Sevilla in 2008

Personal information
- Full name: Ernesto Javier Chevantón Espinosa
- Date of birth: 12 August 1980 (age 46)
- Place of birth: Juan Lacaze, Uruguay
- Height: 1.72 m (5 ft 8 in)
- Position: Forward

Senior career*
Years	Team	Apps	(Gls)
1997–2001	Danubio	57	(49)
2001–2004	Lecce	87	(47)
2004–2006	Monaco	50	(20)
2006–2010	Sevilla	34	(8)
2010	→ Atalanta (loan)	12	(2)
2010–2011	Lecce	14	(2)
2011–2012	Colón	15	(6)
2012–2013	Lecce	14	(6)
2013	Queens Park Rangers	2	(0)
2014–2015	Liverpool Montevideo	10	(3)
Total		295	(143)

International career
2001–2008	Uruguay	22	(7)
- * Club domestic league appearances and goals

Ernesto Javier Chevantón Espinosa (born 12 August 1980) is a Uruguayan former footballer who played as a forward. He has been described as a player who possesses explosiveness, pace and tenacity.

He began his career in 1997 with Danubio in Uruguay, before moving to Europe to play in Italy with Lecce in 2001. He played there for three seasons, scoring 30 goals in 57 matches in two Serie A seasons. He then joined Monaco, scoring 20 league goals in 50 matches over two seasons. He then spent four years with Sevilla in Spain, winning the UEFA Cup and Copa del Rey. Afterwards, he had short spells at a few other clubs, including twice back with Lecce. He retired from professional football in 2015. He also played 22 times for the Uruguay national team, appearing at the 2001 Copa América.

== Club career ==
=== Lecce ===
Chevantón was scouted by US Lecce sports director Pantaleo Corvino and signed in the summer of 2001. Despite his 12 goals in 27 games, Lecce were relegated that season into Serie B and Chevantón stayed with them. His presence would prove vital, scoring 18 goals in 30 games to promote Lecce straight back into top flight domestic football. In the 2003–04 Serie A he was the fourth goalscorer of the tournament with 19 goals and became the all-time goalscorer for Lecce, overcoming former Argentina national team and Lecce player Pedro Pablo Pasculli.

=== Monaco ===
Following the loss of Fernando Morientes (returning to Real Madrid after his loan period expired) and Dado Pršo (who became free agent after failed to agree a new contract), Didier Deschamps was looking to reinforce his frontguard and so made an offer for Chevantón. In July 2004, he signed a 4-year contract with Monaco for a reported €10M. A few weeks later Mohamed Kallon was signed and the duo was expected to become striking partner.

Unfortunately, he was injured in August 2004 and Javier Saviola was signed as replacement. He was fit again in October but injured again in January. Since returned in February, he finally netted a goal in Ligue 1 on 16 April 2005. That season he scored 10 league goals, 1 goal behind Kallon and but ahead rising star Emmanuel Adebayor, Saviola and out-favoured Shabani Nonda. The 2004 UEFA Champions League finalist also exited in the round 16 of 2004–05 UEFA Champions League as non of the Monegasque strikers able to score against PSV.

In 2005–06 season, Nonda was released and Kallon was sent to Middle East on loan. Chevantón and Adebayor became the starting pair under Deschamps. He missed few matches in August 2005 including the 2005–06 UEFA Champions League 3rd qualifying round return leg. Since Francesco Guidolin succeed as coach in October, Chevantón remained as one of the striker in the league. However, he did not play in the whole UEFA Cup group stage, due to both fitness problem and squad rotation. In January 2006, Christian Vieri and Marco Di Vaio were signed and Adebayor was sold (who suffered with injury too). He did a knee operation in January 2006 and return on 7 February, the Coupe de la Ligue semi-final. On the same month, he played as substitute in UEFA Cup round of 32, which the coach preferred Serge Gakpé partnered with Vieri. In the league he played a successive 11 league matches since round 28 (on 25 February) and almost scored in every match (7 goals in 7 different matches). Chevantón became the team top-scorer in the league with 10 goals by his performance in the second half of season, ahead mid-season signing Di Vaio and winger Olivier Kapo who both scored 5 league goals.

=== Sevilla ===
On 1 August 2006, he was signed by 2005–06 UEFA Cup holder Sevilla for a reported €8M and agreed a 5-year contract. The beginning of Chevantón's season at Sevilla started with a back strain which put him out for the first few weeks, but he scored four goals for Sevilla in the UEFA cup against SC Braga, AZ Alkmaar, Shakhtar Donetsk and Grasshopper Club Zürich, and scored his first La Liga goal by way of a stylish bicycle kick at home against Real Madrid on 9 December 2006, which led to the home team's 2–1 victory. The second time Sevilla met Real Madrid that season Chevantón scored another goal with an excellent free kick. He recently netted the equaliser against Arsenal in a pre-season friendly for Sevilla in a 1–1 disappointment at the Emirates but has since found opportunities in the Spanish League limited.

=== Atalanta ===
On 26 November 2009, he was given permission to trial with Serie A club Atalanta, who ultimately agreed a loan deal with Sevilla. The player joined the club on 2 January 2010, until the end of the 2009–10 season.

=== Lecce ===
On 23 August 2010, Chevantón returned to his former club Lecce. His contract with Sevilla was terminated in earlier days.

=== Colón de Santa Fe ===
In July 2011, Lecce didn't renew his contract and he was hired by the Argentinian team Colón de Santa Fe.

=== Lecce ===
In the summer of 2012, he joined Lecce, now in the Lega Pro Prima Divisione, for a third time after their relegation from Serie A in 2011–12 and subsequent expulsion from the Serie B for their part in the Calcio Scommesse scandal.

=== Queens Park Rangers ===
On 25 September 2013, Chevantón signed a short-term deal, until Christmas Eve, with English Championship club Queens Park Rangers. He made his debut for the club on 5 October 2013, coming on as a late substitute for Niko Kranjčar in a 2–0 win against Barnsley.

Chevantón was released by Queens Park Rangers on 24 December 2013.

=== Liverpool (Uruguay) ===
After being released by QPR, Chevantón left England and returned to Uruguay where he signed a contract with Liverpool F.C. (Montevideo).

== International career ==
Run-ins with the Uruguay head coach Jorge Fossati have restricted his playing time for the national team, most strikingly obvious was his omission from the last stage of 2006 World Cup qualification. Uruguay failed to qualify for the 2006 World Cup.

After a long spell out of the national side Chevantón was finally included back in the Uruguay national squad for 2010 FIFA World Cup qualification in September 2008 for the matches against Argentina and Bolivia in October. It was partially due to the injury of Diego Forlán. Chevantón played the match against Argentina as substitute in the 73rd minutes for Sebastián Abreu while Abreu partnered mainly with Luis Suárez and Edinson Cavani during the match. Chevantón was then dropped against Bolivia and was not called up again due to personal fitness and competition among Uruguay's top strikers.
