= History of UC Sampdoria =

This is the history of Unione Calcio Sampdoria, commonly referred to as UC Sampdoria or simply Sampdoria (Italian pronunciation: [sampˈdɔːrja, sanˈdɔːrja]), an Italian professional football club based in Genoa, Liguria.

== History ==
=== Origins ===
==== Sampierdarenese and Andrea Doria ====
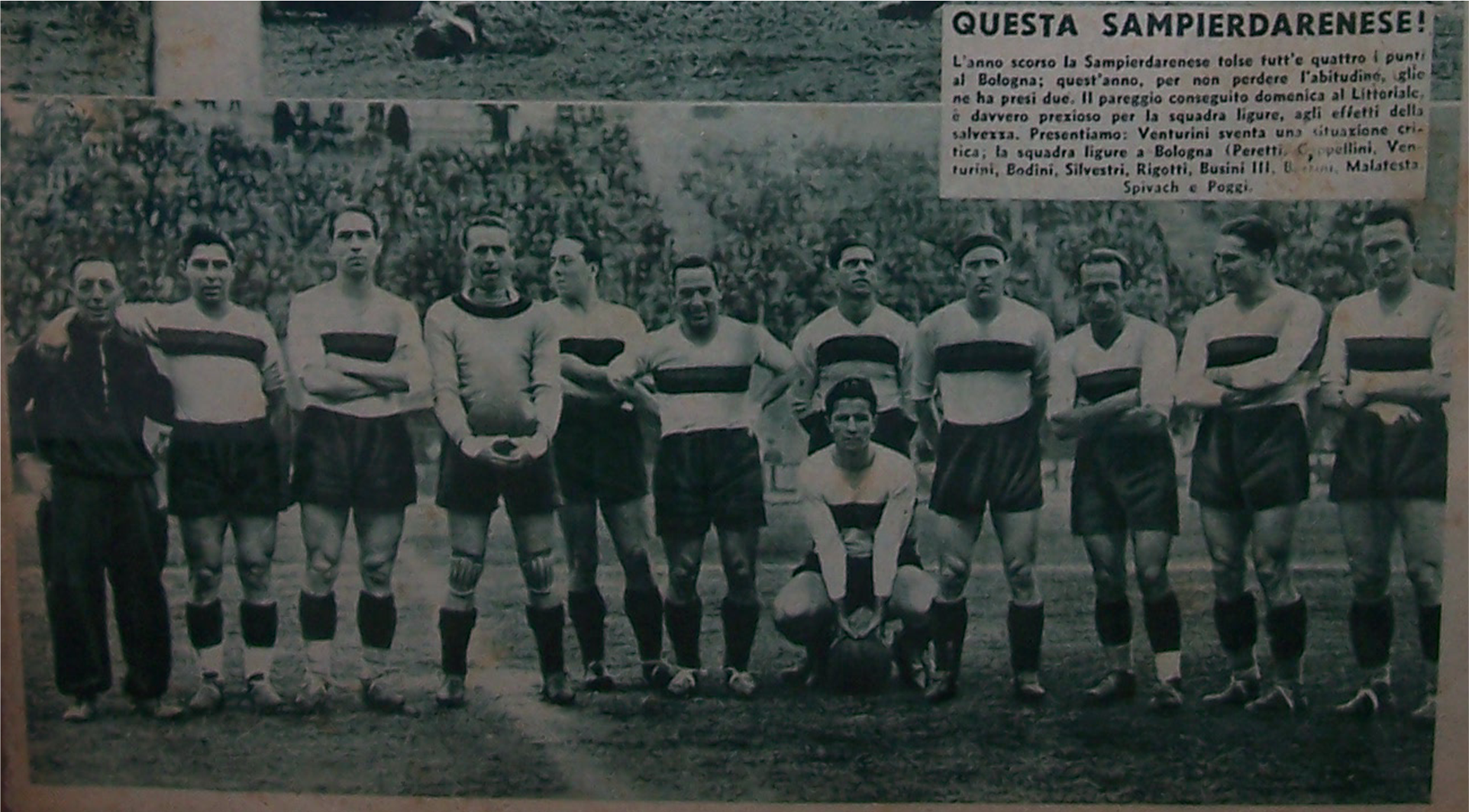
Sampierdarenese's lineup in 1936

The Società Ginnastica Comunale Sampierdarenese, founded in 1891, opened its soccer section in 1899. After a few championships in the lower categories, the club merged with Associazione del Calcio Ligure in 1919, thus winning the right to join the top league.

The announcement of the merger
between Sampierdarenese and Andrea Doria

Doria and Samp merge
Anyway, best wishes to the gentlemen of “Doria-Samp”

"The Doria-Samp merger, it's in the works. Strange events of life. One day the hierarchs got the urge to merge Doria and Samp to make room for whoever they cared for the most, and they practically committed a crime of "lese personality" aggravating it with the mockery of the name given to the new creature born of the fatherhood. Do you remember? La Dominante. And the merged ones retaliated in the only way allowed: by being dominated. So it happened that at a given moment each took its own path again: the Samp in the lead, the Doria in the shadows. But Doria has an almost American agenda. Not for nothing are the Rissotto brothers buzzing around it. Genoa is said to have come to the rossoneribiancoblù with three and a half million. Will you give us, Fiorini? No, they said, the biancoblurossoneri. We were crazy. There's Napoli who sent up an emissary with five and a half million...And we want six. But why are they selling Fiorini if this great team is to be born? However, even without Fiorini, the great team should spring from the volcanic brains of Sanguineti, Corti, Tredici, Lari, and Parodi, joined by the old foxes Buttignol and Cornetto. Two goalkeepers of great class, Lusetti and Bonetti, three outspoken full-backs: Battaia, Sacchetti, Parena; six midfielders (by the way, Milani has been hanging around Genoa for a few days now...) Gramaglia, Bertoni, Bertani, Diotallevi, Sandroni, Castignani, plus the eventual purchase; a series of forwards led by Baldini, with Bassetto, Conti II, Carissimi, Di Piazza, Frugali, Castelli, Ventimiglia, Parodi, Braga, Parvis, Opisso. There is a lot of trimming to be done."
—Edgardo D'Apua, Il Secolo XIX, July 11, 1946

The gymnasts of Andrea Doria, founded in 1895, also began to broaden the disciplines they practiced, devoting themselves to soccer as well and occupying for this purpose the space in what is now Piazza Verdi, in front of which the Genoa Brignole station was being built. Andrea Doria did not participate in the first championships organized by the Italian Football Federation (F.I.F.) since it enrolled instead in the soccer tournaments organized directly by the Italian Federation of Gymnastics, to which it adhered, although Francesco Calì, the first captain of the Italy national team, played in the club from 1902 for several years. He made his championship debut on March 9, 1902, and participated in the following editions until 1913.

On July 27, 1927, at the behest of the fascist regime, Andrea Doria and Sampierdarenese were merged, giving rise to Associazione Calcio La Dominante, which in 1930 assumed the name Foot Ball Club Liguria. Later, in 1931, the FBC Liguria relegated to the third division and for this reason the club was broken up: thus Sampierdarenese and Andrea Doria were reborn, which resumed their activities separately. Sampierdarenese succeeded in returning to the top division at the end of the 1933-1934 season, but on July 15, 1937, after a meeting at the “Casa del Fascio,” it was forced to assume the name Associazione Calcio Liguria, while retaining its social colors, following the merger of Corniglianese and Rivarolese; Andrea Doria, meanwhile, followed its path in Serie C until its dissolution in 1941. The Dorian club was reconstituted in 1944, while Sampierdarenese regained its historic name the following year.

==== The birth of Sampdoria ====
After World War II had prevented regular soccer championships from taking place in 1943-1944, Sampierdarenese and Andrea Doria returned to activity in 1945. At the end of the 1945-1946 National Division, Andrea Doria was ranked 10th in the Serie A Alta Italia, while Sampierdarenese was ranked 14th and last. Sampierdarenese was, therefore, to be excluded from the next edition of Serie A due to the exhaustion of places provided for in the championship regulations when, following the reunification of the North and South national leagues, it was decided to give preference to sports titles acquired over time: therefore, Sampierdarenese, by virtue of the past season played as AC Liguria, was admitted to the new 20-team single-round league at the expense of Andrea Doria, which had been readmitted to the top division as compensation for the forced merger into Dominante. This caught the Dorians off guard, who had already purchased, for the considerable sum of 3,200,000 lire, the rising star Adriano Bassetto from Vicenza. Thus an embarrassing situation was created: Sampierdarenese was in Serie A but with a disastrous economic-financial situation, while the “rich” Andrea Doria was relegated automatically to Serie B. After a series of meetings, the managements of the two clubs agreed, therefore, to join forces.

The new club, the Unione Calcio Sampierdarenese-Doria known as “Sampdoria,” was formed on August 12, 1946, with the final merger between Andrea Doria and Sampierdarenese; initially the planned naming was “Doria-Sampierdarenese” (Doria-Samp). The first president was Piero Sanguineti, who was soon replaced by ambitious businessman Amedeo Rissotto, while the first coach was Florentine Giuseppe Galluzzi. Sampdoria was immediately admitted to Serie A, by virtue of the top sports title inherited from Sampierdarenese, while Andrea Doria provided the sporting and economic resources.

In the same month, the new club returned to play on Andrea Doria's “historic” playing ground, namely what was the ground known as the “Cajenna” in the Marassi district, which has since become the Luigi Ferraris Stadium.

For the new club, a jersey was designed that combined the colors of both teams: the white and blue of Andrea Doria, with the white, red and black of Sampierdarenese. The result was a unique uniform, a blue jersey interspersed with two white stripes, one red and one black, with the coat of arms of Genoa (the cross of St. George) in the center. The team's symbol, on the other hand, is composed of a bundle of blue-ringed stripes placed diagonally, in the center of which is a black silhouette depicting the face of a typical stylized Genoese fisherman with beard, a distinctive cap, a pipe and his hair blowing in the wind. This figure is called “baciccia” in Genoese dialect.

==== Debut and the first derby ====
Sampdoria's first match was played on September 22, 1946 in Rome at the old Stadio Nazionale. The first blucerchiata formation was as follows: Bonetti as goalkeeper; Borrini, Bertani and Zorzi in defense; Gramaglia (Sampdoria's first captain), Fattori, Bassetto and Fiorini in midfield; Fabbri, Baldini and Frugali in attack.

The match ended 3-1 for Roma, with the first historic blucerchiato goal scored by Bassetto, who would remain at Samp until 1953, becoming its first icon. For the home side, the phenomenal Amadei, another Italian soccer star, scored three goals.

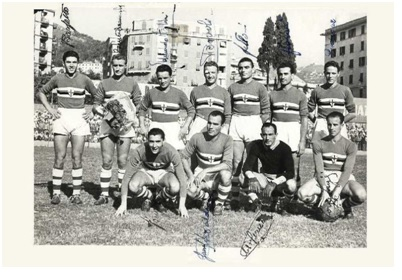
The first ever Sampdoria lineup, 1946-1947 season. From left, standing: Bassetto, Gramaglia, Fabbri, Bovoli, Fattori, Fiorini, Pischianz; crouching: Frugali, Baldini, Lusetti, Zorzi.

In the same year, Sampdoria faced Genoa for the first time, in the first historic Genoa derby. It was played in a packed stadium on November 3, 1946: the result was 3-0 for the blucerchiati, with goals scored by Baldini, Fiorini and Frugali. In the return match, it was again Sampdoria that had the better of the match; 3-2 at the final whistle, with Bassetto's double and D'Alconzo's goal: Piacentini's own goal and Dalla Torre's goal were not enough for the rossoblù.

Another memorable result was the victory achieved against AC Milan on October 13, 1946, on the fourth day: after an initial disadvantage, sealed by the rossonero Gimona, the blucerchiati managed to recover the result with a double, between the first and second half, by the usual Baldini.

==== Early championships ====
Overall, the first two seasons saw Sampdoria place in the last positions, while still managing to achieve salvation; in their debut in the top national competition, the blucerchiati did not disappoint, finishing in a more than honorable tenth place, a non-negligible achievement given the club's youth. The good placement in the standings was mainly due to Baldini and Bassetto, authors of 18 and 13 goals, respectively: they were nicknamed “the goal twins,” a title later assumed by Vialli and Mancini at the time of the historic 1991 Scudetto.

Then, after a year marked by a difficult salvation, Sampdoria surprised everyone by placing fifth. The 1948-1949 season was the season of attack with Baldini and Bassetto assuming the role of authentic protagonists, contributing decisively to the fifth place ranking. Due to their good results, Sampdoria saw an increase in national interest in them: this was demonstrated by the first convocation of a blucerchiato player to the national team. In fact, in 1949, thanks to his excellent performances with the blucerchiata jersey, Baldini was called up to the national team for the friendly match against Portugal: it was the debut of the first Sampdorian footballer with the blue jersey. The match, in which the player was a starter and attended by the first president of the Republic, Enrico De Nicola, was played at the Luigi Ferraris: a 4-1 win for the Azzurri was the final result.

The typical lineup during that season consisted of: Lusetti as goalkeeper; Gratton, Arrighini, Gaerd and Bertani in defense; Coscia, Lucentini, Gei and Bassetto on the midfield; Lorenzo and Sabbatella as forwards.

==== From Rissotto to Parodi ====
In 1949, Sampdoria had a new president: it was Aldo Parodi, an ambitious man who was already president of Andrea Doria at the time of the merger; it seemed that with Parodi there could be a further leap in quality, but the reality was different. In fact, in the following season, the team did not go beyond thirteenth place.

=== 1950s ===
==== Fluctuating results ====
After the good placing two years earlier, Sampdoria had attracted an increasing number of fans, including many of the Genoese who had never been interested in the fortunes of the rossoblù colors. Thus, there were growing expectations on the part of the blucerchiati supporters, whose support, however, was not rewarded by the team and then-president Parodi.

The logo of U.C. Sampdoria from the 1950s to the early 1970s

The decade began with a twelfth-place finish, the result of a poor transfer window, the climax of which was reached with the sale of Giuseppe Baldini to rivals Genoa. Gei and Sabbatella arrived, authors of some important goals, but in that season the team conceded 76 goals: no other team, including Genoa, which was last in the standings and relegated to Serie B, did worse. Moreover, the era of the “atomic attack” was over, with a total of 51 goals scored.

President Parodi finally understood that the defense needed a radical transformation: from Novara came the experienced midfielder Oppezzo; from Lucchese came Moro, the goalkeeper of madness, bloopers and miracles par excellence; from Livorno came the central midfielder Fommei. And the transfer window yielded the hoped-for results: on the one hand, a good number of goals scored, while on the other only 40 goals conceded. The 1951-1952 season ended with a satisfactory seventh place, which allowed for the necessary improvement in relations between the president and fans, who had previously shown some disappointment over the team's poor performance.

==== Ravano's successes ====
The following year, in which fans expected that there might be further improvement, was instead short on success. For the first time Sampdoria was involved in the struggle to avoid relegation: in the end, only two precious victories (against Inter, 2-0 away, and Palermo, 4-1 at Marassi, respectively) allowed the club to remain in the top division. In the summer of 1953, president Aldo Parodi stepped aside and was replaced by Alberto Ravano, whose long presidency (which lasted eight years) was characterized mainly by good results.

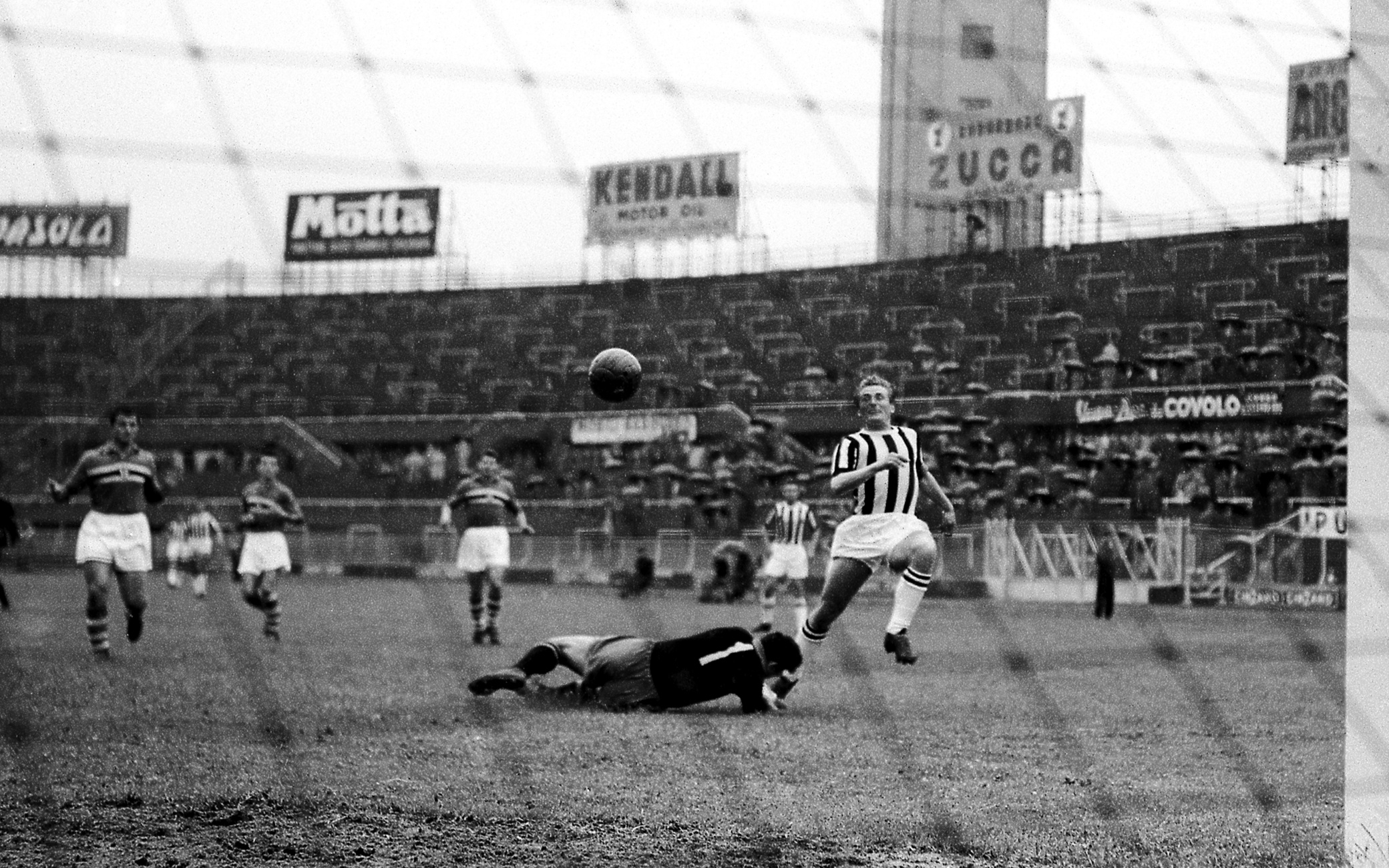
Match between Sampdoria and Juventus in the 1954-55 Serie A season.

During Ravano’s first season as president, Adriano Bassetto left Sampdoria after making 196 appearances and scoring 93 goals. New arrivals included Testa, Podestà and Tortul, while Giuseppe Baldini returned after playing for Genoa. Sampdoria finished eighth in Serie A.

The following season, 1954-1955, characterized by the excellent performance of the young defender Bernasconi, who would later become a blucerchiato icon, was quite good: the ninth place finish, accompanied by convincing performances against the big ones (especially Juventus), satisfied the Sampdorian fans. In particular, the match played at Marassi on January 30, 1955 against the Bianconeri was memorable: 5-1 was the final result, with goals by Rosa, Ronzon, Baldini, Tortul and Conti for Samp, and Bronèe's goal for the Torinese.

==== The first big signings: from Firmani to Vicini ====
After the team's good placing, President Ravano decided to further strengthen it: Sampdoria's top signing was striker Eddie Firmani: his 18 goals in 29 games, along with great performances by the team and especially by the talented Tortul, enabled Doria to achieve a sixth place finish. They never managed to overcome their fellow citizens: in the first leg a 2-1 defeat, while in the return, played “at home,” a boring 0-0.

In July 1956, Alberto Ravano brought to Genoa the first valuable foreigner, Ernst Ocwirk, playmaker and captain of Austria. His arrival was accompanied by that of young midfielder Azeglio Vicini, now best known for having coached the Italy national team in the late 1980s. The year was marked by the great scoring streaks of Firmani and Ocwirk, authors of eleven and ten goals respectively, but also by a “dancing” defense, which turned out to be the most beaten after those of Palermo and Udinese. The fifth place finish turned out to be quite surprising, given the large number of goals conceded, but the high number of goals allowed Samp to make up for the defensive deficiencies.

==== The days of “Tito” Cucchiaroni ====
The 1957-1958 season saw the blucerchiati struggling to avoid relegation. The team, coached by Lajos Czeizler, achieved salvation only on the last day, with a resounding 4-0 victory over Torino. For the umpteenth time, the defense turned out to be the most beaten in the entire Serie A: there were as many as 62 times when “the ball had to be picked up in the back of the net.” The youth team's victory in the Viareggio Tournament did not affect Ravano's choices: he then decided to replace him with Eraldo Monzeglio.

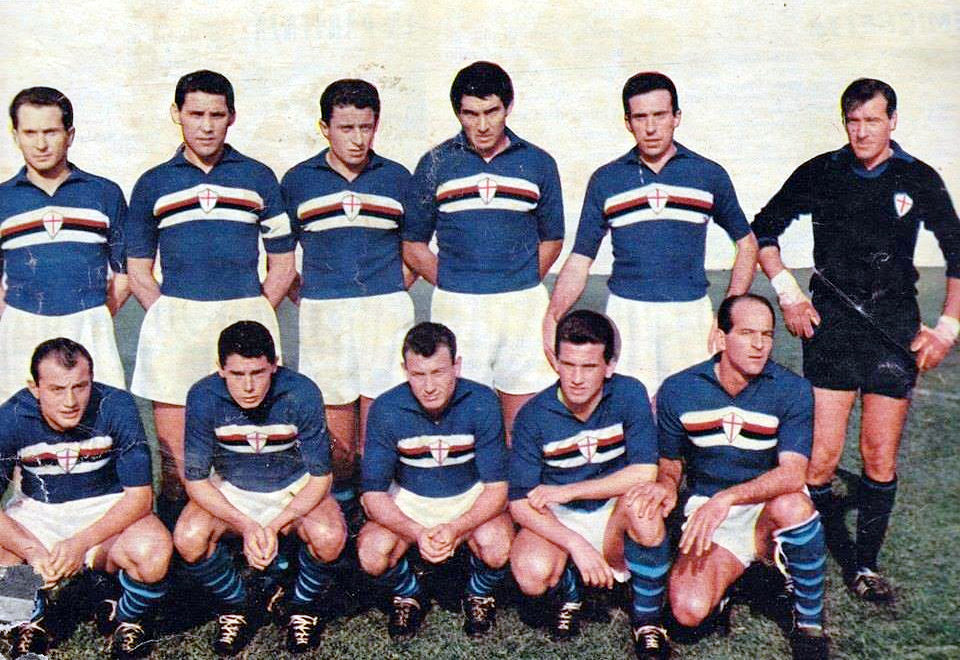
A Sampdoria lineup in the 1959-1960 season. From left, standing: Vicini, Ocwirk, Milani, Vincenzi, Bergamaschi, Bardelli; crouching: Bernasconi, Mora, Tomasin, Recagno, Cucchiaroni.

The president made the right choice. The sale of the striker Firmani to Inter brought not only substantial revenues to the blucerchiate coffers, but also Vincenzi, a defender destined to wear the Doria jersey for another ten years. His arrival was accompanied by those of “Tito” Cucchiaroni and Milani, both of whom came from Milanese teams, and by those of important youngsters who had grown up in the youth ranks, such as Grabesu and Vergazzola. Few goals conceded and a fair number of goals scored, especially by Cucchiaroni and Milani (10 and 11 goals, respectively), yielded a fifth place finish behind the greats of Italian soccer.

The 1950s ended with another eighth place finish, determined by rather fluctuating performances. The arrival of Swede Skoglund, author of seven goals, and the good games played by Ocwirk and Cucchiaroni, were not enough to confirm the fifth-place ranking of the year before. An important role for the not so good blucerchiata season was played by the injury of striker Milani, who was injured in the match against Bologna, played on November 22, 1959, and suffered ruptured ligaments: he was out until May 1960, and the blow was so hard for the team that the five matches following the one against the Emilian team were lost.

=== 1960s ===
==== Brighenti's arrival and fourth place finish ====
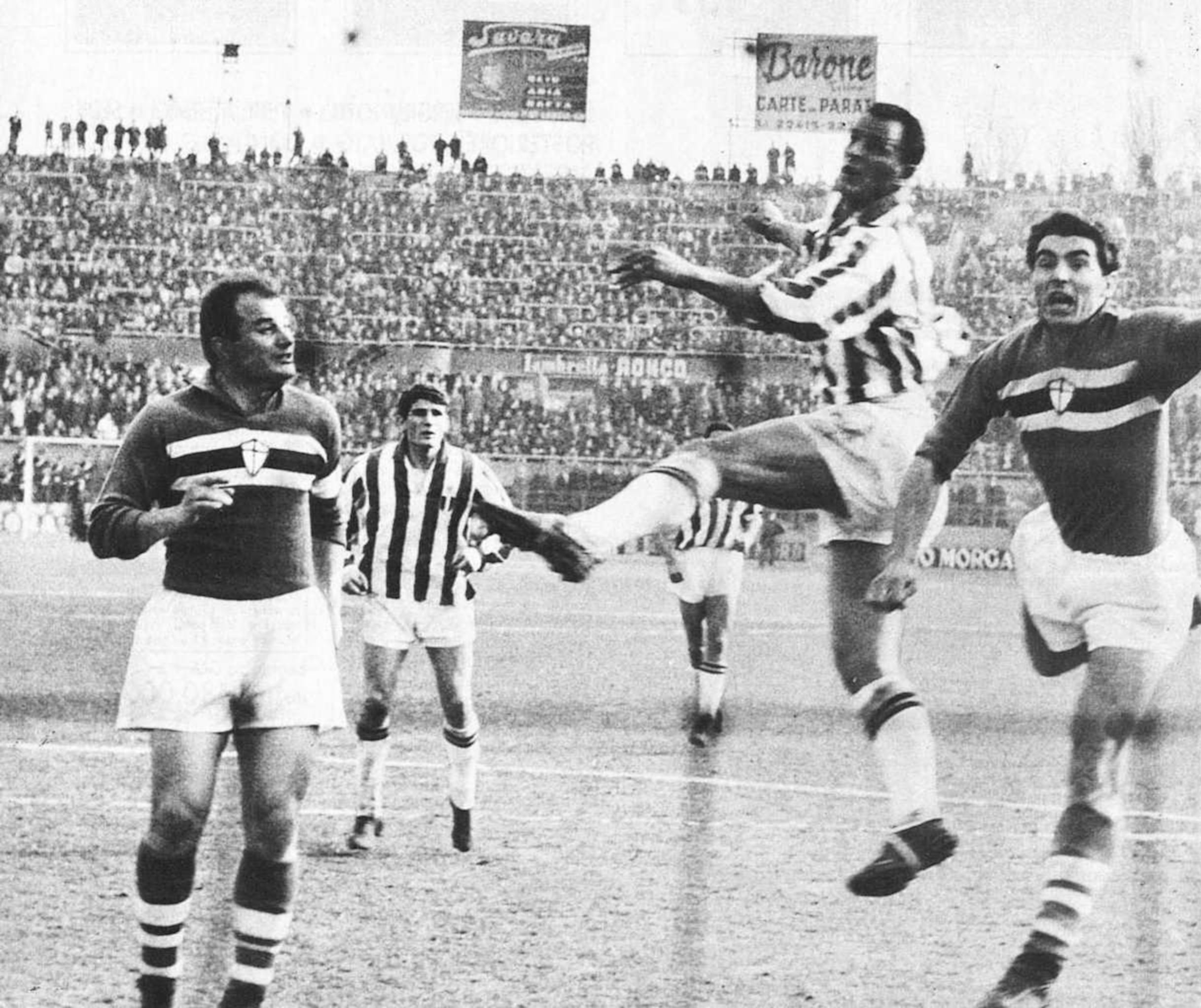
A 1960-61 Serie A match between Sampdoria and Juventus

Club president Alberto Ravano was not satisfied with the side's eighth-spot finish in the 1959–1960 playing-year. Although at odds with the fans over some big player deals, the club bought another player who had previously been let go by Inter Milan. Joining former AC Milan player Cucchiaroni and former Inter player Skoglund, national-team player Sergio Brighenti arrived in Genoa from Padova. The striker from Modena quickly became a top performer for Sampdoria, leading them to a fourth-place standing behind the usual dominators of Italian football. Driven by 17 wins, 41 points, and—above all—27 goals from Brighenti,[1] Sampdoria won a landmark finish. This is still the Genoese side's third-best standing in Serie A history, coming after only their 1991 league title and a third-place finish in 1994. Cucchiaroni, Ocwirk, and Skoglund also had strong seasons. Cucchiaroni scored eight goals, while the other two provided scoring support.

However, the season was troubled by a small issue, consisting of the continuous alternation between the two goalkeepers on the roster: the experienced Rosin, who had been at Samp for a few years, and the young Sattolo, newly acquired from Ivrea. The latter enjoyed Monzeglio's trust until the third day, when, suddenly, the coach preferred Rosin to him, who in turn had to give up his place after the bitter defeat to Catania. Eventually, the “old” goalkeeper finally regained his starting place, after the embarrassing performance delivered by Sattolo against Udinese: the match, played in Udine on January 22, 1961, ended with a resounding 7-1.

==== Lolli Ghetti and the beginning of the long crisis ====
It seemed that the great placement of the last season could heal the still strained relations between club and supporters, but this did not happen. The blucerchiati supporters continued to dislike the actions of the club, made up mainly of excellent transfers; therefore, the president, under unbearable pressure from his family, who wanted to see him leave the world of soccer, decided, albeit reluctantly, to leave. On the part of the club, a special commission was then convened, which chose, as Ravano's successor, wealthy shipowner Glauco Lolli Ghetti. The newly elected president promised the fans, who were enthusiastic about the ambitious Ciociarian, that the team would fight for the Scudetto. However, this was not the case. After the confirmation of Monzeglio and the departure of the great “fighter” Ocwirk, Lolli Ghetti brought to Genoa the experienced Slavs Boskov and Veselinovic, whose great experience was not enough to confirm the result of the previous season. On the contrary, the tenth place finish was even considered satisfactory, given that, with only a few days to go, the team was given up for dead: only Monzeglio's replacement by Roberto Lerici allowed Sampdoria to save itself, with a total of eight points in the last six days.

The 1961-1962 season saw Sampdoria's first participation in an international tournament, the Mitropa Cup: the European debut was bad, as the team did not even make it past the first round.

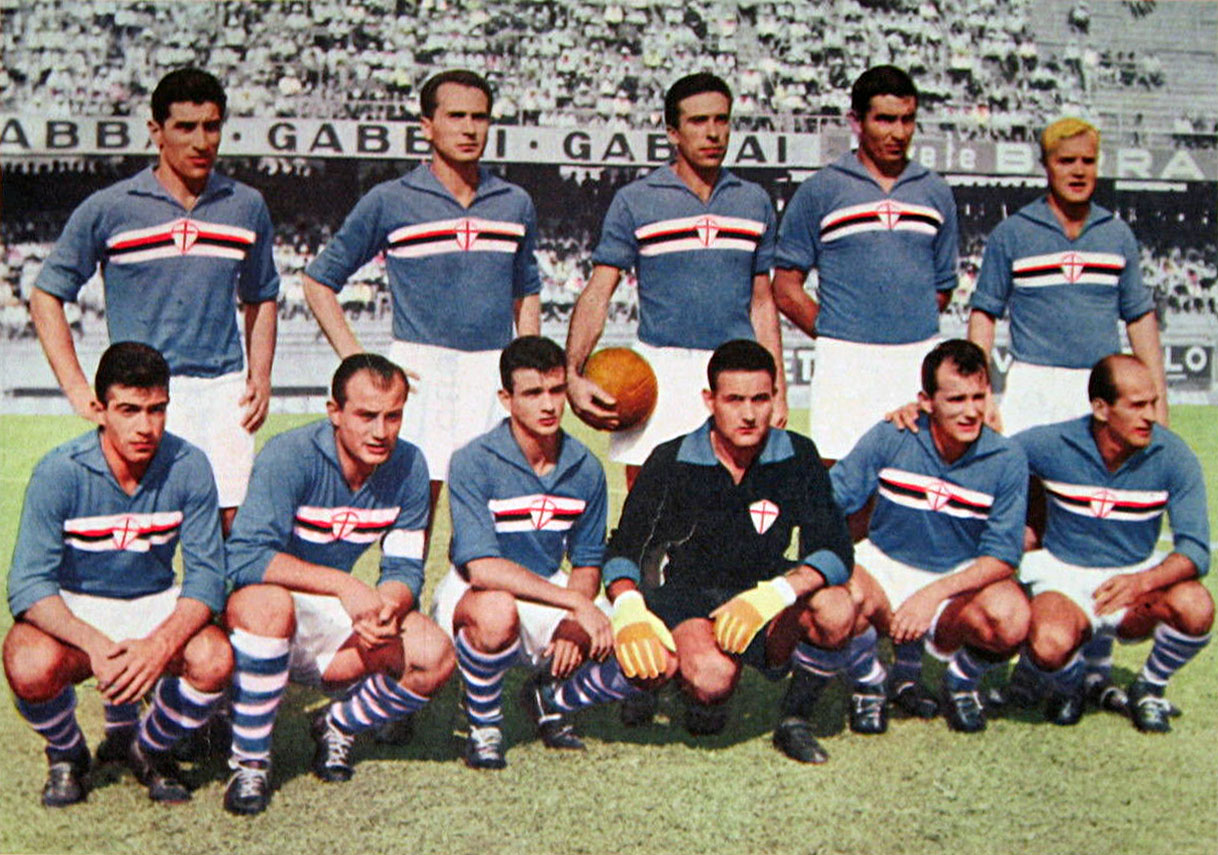
A line-up of U.C. Sampdoria in the 1961–62 season. From left to right, standing: S. Brighenti, A. Vicini, M. Bergamaschi, G. Vincenzi, L. Skoglund; crouched: L. Toschi, G. Bernasconi (captain), P. Marocchi, U. Rosin, V. Boškov, E. Cucchiaroni.

The 1962-1963 season, marked by the arrival of Jorge Toro, was notable for the exit from the Fairs Cup, following a 6-0 defeat to the Hungarian side Ferencvaros. Sampdoria did no better in the league. The 2-1 defeat against Genoa, suffered on the fifth day, cost Lerici his job, who was replaced by the old blucerchiata icon Ocwirk, sent away in 1961 because of misunderstandings with the president. Mathematical salvation, which was achieved a few days before the end of the championship, was achieved mainly thanks to the good scoring streaks of Cucchiaroni and the Brazilian “China” Da Silva, the latter the author of thirteen goals. On the other hand, Brighenti was unable to even come close to the great results of the year before: only eight goals were scored by the Modenese footballer. As a result, the South American turned out to be the only positive note of the season, while Toro, referred to at the beginning as the team's extra man, scored only three goals (including two on penalties): in the end, he moved to Modena, where he stayed for seven years. Meanwhile, the performance of Sampdoria's youngsters, who won the Viareggio Tournament, was excellent.

In the summer of 1963, the president did not adequately reinforce the team: the departures of Cucchiaroni, Brighenti and Toro were replaced exclusively by the purchase of ex-Genoa player Barison, whose 13 goals were not enough to have a good championship. A bad end to the season forced Sampdoria to play Modena in the play-off to avoid relegation: the match, played at the San Siro stadium in Milan on June 7, 1964, saw the blucerchiati prevail 2-0, with goals by Barison and Salvi.

The following season was marked by the arrival of elderly and modest players. The offensive trident created by Ocwirk, formed by Da Silva, Sormani and Lojacono, did not allow the team to make the leap in quality that had been asked of them. Only sixteen goals were scored by the three South Americans, including seven by Da Silva, the only one who kept the weak Sampdorian formation afloat. However, only a good defense, which made up for the poor scoring streak of the blucerchiati forwards, allowed Sampdoria to achieve salvation. In the end, after the change of coach, which saw the replacement of the Austrian coach with the old icon Baldini, the fourteenth place was achieved, behind Lazio by goal difference (the number of points was in fact the same) and ahead of Genoa, Messina and Mantova, saving themselves from relegation at the expense of the latter which were relegated to Serie B.

==== De Franceschini's arrival and the first relegation ====
After achieving salvation, Lolli Ghetti resigned as president: in his place came Enrico De Franceschini, who arranged to confirm Giuseppe Baldini. Among the heaviest defeats was the one at the hands of Fiorentina: the match, played on the seventh day, saw the Tuscans outclass the Genoese with a result of 5-0. The president, who had lost confidence in Baldini, decided to place alongside him the experienced Fulvio Bernardini, who ended up permanently replacing "Pinella" after a few days. The former Bologna and Fiorentina coach failed to pull off the miracle of saving Sampdoria from relegation: on the last day, the Genoese were defeated by Juventus, while SPAL, a direct competitor for salvation, drew, with a surprising comeback, against Brescia. The 2-2 final draw is still the subject of many suspicions, which focus especially on the famous referee Concetto Lo Bello, who officiated that "strange" match.

On the third last day against Lazio in the away match, referee Bernardis from Trieste did not grant the blucerchiati a penalty, defined as "evident" by all the national press, for a foul by goalkeeper Gori on Sampdorian center forward Ermanno Cristin. The failure to concede the penalty turned out to be decisive in the fight against relegation: if Samp had scored the penalty and obtained the victory, they would have joined Lazio in the standings, thus taking a step toward salvation.

==== The quick rise with Salatti ====
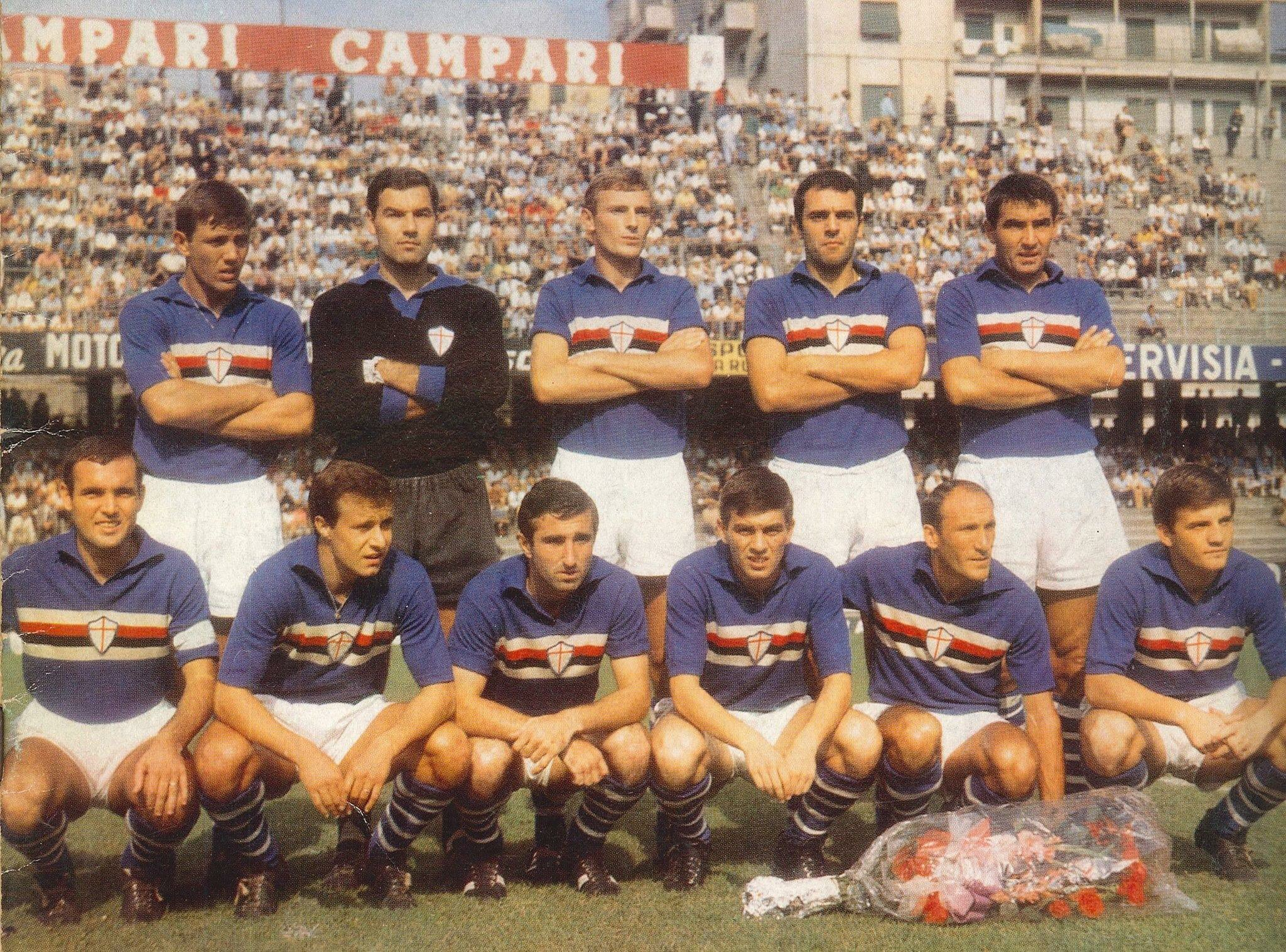
U.C. Sampdoria lineup for the 1966-67 season at the Luigi Ferraris Stadium in Genoa.

The relegation to Serie B led President De Franceschini to resign: in his place came Arnaldo Salatti, who proceeded to confirm Bernardini and reinforce the team with some good players, among whom Roberto Vieri and forward Francesconi stood out. The year was marked by an exciting duel between Samp and Varese, won in the end by the blucerchiata team, which ended the season in first place, with a tally of 20 wins, 14 draws and 4 losses. The team's top scorer was Francesconi, who scored 20 goals, followed by Salvi and Vieri, who scored 12 and 5 goals, respectively. The fellow rossoblù played in the second tier as well, eventually finishing in 12th place, but they gave the blucerchiata team quite a bit of trouble: the derby of the first leg saw a 0-0 draw, while in the return leg captain Rivara decided for Genoa. The last match of the year was played at Marassi on June 18, 1967: the match, played against the already relegated Alessandria, was decided by a goal from the blucerchiato Francesconi.

In the corporate sphere, there was an important change on March 23 of that year: the Unione Calcio Sampierdarenese-Doria "Sampdoria" partnership was put into liquidation and replaced by Unione Calcio Sampdoria Spa, established with a share capital of 200,000,000 lire.

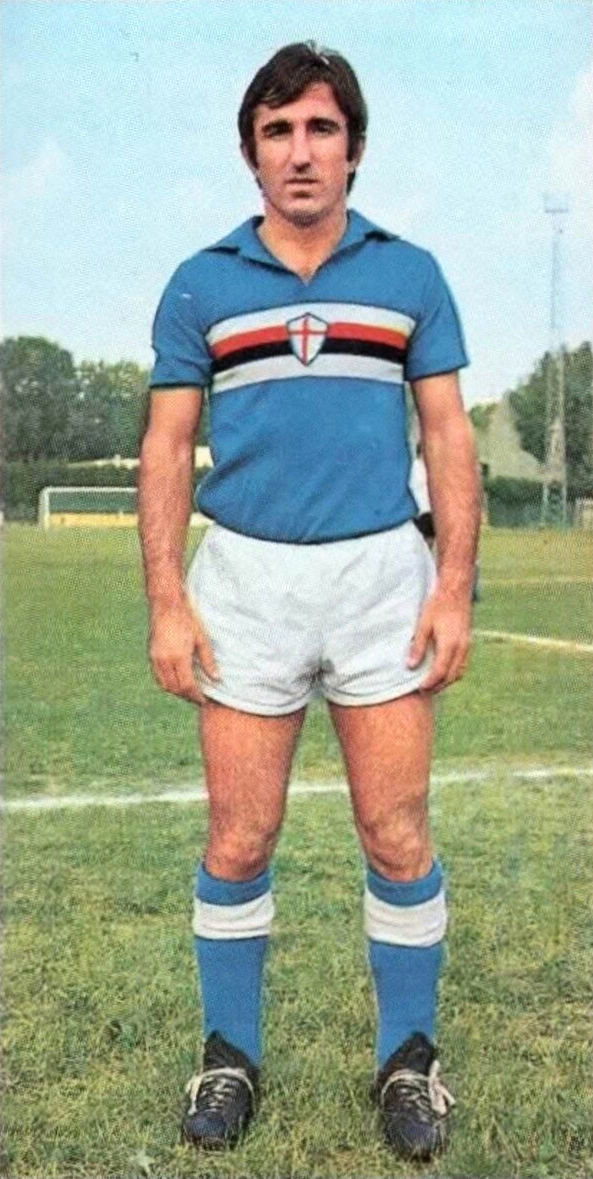
Fulvio Francesconi with U.C. Sampdoria in the 1970–71 season.

In the following summer, Salatti received, from coach Bernardini, a request not to give up any valuable pieces; the president followed the coach's advice, giving up only Tenemma and signing Carpanesi, from Roma, in his place. The first half of the season saw a good Sampdoria in terms of play, but not in terms of results, as the blucerchiata team found itself in the relegation zone with ten points. Bernardini's words, which spurred the team on to achieve salvation, galvanized the blucerchiati players: with 17 points in the return leg, Sampdoria finished tenth. It was above all Cristin, Francesconi and Vieri, with their 20 total goals, who allowed the team not to suffer too much in the championship finale.

The president, without giving exhaustive explanations, resigned at the end of that season, leaving his place to lawyer Mario Colantuoni, with whom a rather negative period began, made up of salvations reached on the last day.

The 1968-1969 season was very similar to the previous one. Colantuoni did not give up any of the valuable players, thus pleasing Bernardini, however the first part of the championship saw Sampdoria constantly clinging to the fourth last place, due to some bad results; only the last games of the year, particularly the last six, were satisfactory (as many as eight points out of twelve available). In this way, the blucerchiata formation reached 12th place, just one point from the relegation zone. Salvation was mainly due to the good defense, led by a stoic Battara, by then the team's longtime flagship player: the attack scored only 21 goals, making it one of the weakest in the top league; neither Francesconi nor Vieri were able to maintain their standards.

After the painful salvation, the Sampdoria fans thought that Colantuoni would do everything to strengthen the team, but he did the exact opposite; with the sale of Vieri and Morini to Juventus in exchange for Romeo Benetti and more money, Sampdoria became much weaker. The arrival of the promising midfielder, moreover highly esteemed by coach Bernardini, was not enough to change the goal of the season, which was, as usual, to achieve salvation. Sampdoria, led by its excellent defense, with goalkeeper Battara and defender Sabadini at the forefront, allowed the team to achieve 14th place, saving itself with two days to go. The offense scored only 20 goals, including four by winger Cristin; the most prolific center forward was Francesconi, who scored three goals in 14 games.

=== 1970s: a decade of crisis ===
==== From Bernardini to the "defensive-minded" Herrera ====
As was frequent in the last summer seasons, Sampdoria fans expected important signings from the president: these came, but by other teams; Colantuoni gave up some important players, such as midfielders Frustalupi and Benetti, who were sold to Inter and Milan, respectively. In exchange for them, Giovanni Lodetti and Luisito Suarez arrived at Samp. As in the previous year, the president of the blucerchiata club hoped that Bernardini's experience would again lead the team to salvation: and indeed, Colantuoni was right. After the usual difficult start, the experienced coach managed to lead his team to salvation, albeit achieved only on the last day, thanks to an important draw at the Menti by L.R. Vicenza. However, it was only due to goal difference that Sampdoria were not relegated to Serie B; the blucerchiata team had the same points as Fiorentina and Foggia, but due to its goal difference it was not relegated again: the Apulian team were relegated.

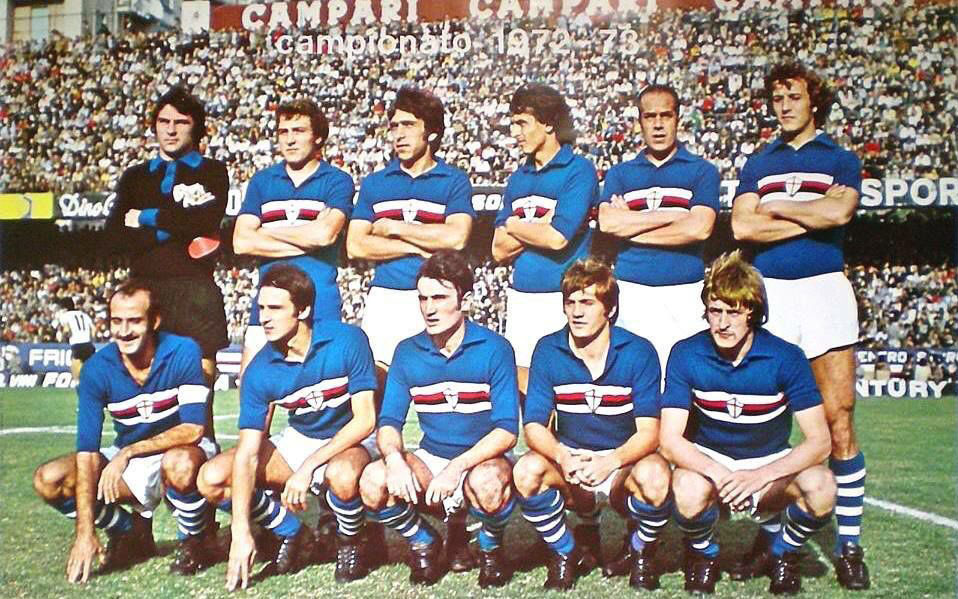
A line-up of U.C. Sampdoria in the 1972–73 season, posing inside the Luigi Ferraris Stadium in Genoa.

In that year, once again, Cristin demonstrated his good scoring prowess: his nine goals, along with Salvi's eight and Suarez's five, allowed Samp to make up for the unusual defensive deficiencies, an obvious consequence of Frustalupi's departure to Milan. Alongside them stood out the small, acrobatic Fotia, an often unstoppable winger. Moreover, in that very season, the young Marcello Lippi, coming from the youth academy, made his appearance.

The 1971-1972 season was characterized by the departure of coach Bernardini to other shores; President Colantuoni blamed Bernardini for the team's poor results, and therefore decided to replace him with Heriberto Herrera, a great overseer of the defensive phase, but not particularly of the offensive one. Not surprisingly, at the end of that year, only 28 goals were conceded, while the forwards scored only 23: for the umpteenth time, the strong-willed Cristin proved to be the most prolific player, with five goals scored. The defense, led by Battara and young Lippi, proved to be one of the best organized, so much so that it attracted the interest of the big teams. In addition to the good backline, a positive note of the year was certainly the young center forward Spadetto, who scored, in eleven games, four goals, doing, as a result, almost better than the starting forwards.

In the following summer, the blucerchiata flagship player Cristin, who was disliked by the coach, left Sampdoria: along with him, for the same reason, also left Fotia and goalkeeper Battara, who had defended the Doria goal for so many years. The only added value left in the blucerchiata jersey, since the arrivals were unable to adequately replace the departing players, was Salvi, whose seven goals allowed the team to save itself. The last match of the year, played away against Torino, saw the blucerchiata team win 1-0 with Boni's goal: the victory proved decisive, as the favorable goal difference ensured salvation (it was Atalanta, who were relegated to Serie B, who had the worst of it). In the summer, Sampdoria, after the opening of an investigation, even risked being relegated to the second tier, but sports justice, even in the face of an actual lack of evidence and some journalistic inferences, condemned the team with a four-point deduction in the following championship, which, after several appeals, was reduced to three.

==== From relegation to repechage ====
In the summer of 1973, after five years as president, Colantuoni resigned; probably, the reasons for this abandonment were due to the strong suspicions that were brought against him, being in fact indicated as the main organizer of the alleged match-fixing: in his place came Giulio Rolandi. The new president did not appreciate the Paraguayan coach's style of play: for this reason, after dismissing him, he hired former blucerchiato player Guido Vincenzi, who had just taken his coaching license. For Vincenzi it was his first experience as a coach in Serie A: leading Sampdoria to salvation, given the weak lineup available and the three-point deduction, was a real utopia. Cristin's return and the good performances of Lodetti and Lippi were not enough to avoid relegation: Sampdoria finished second-to-last, followed only by Genoa. The club was resigned to participating in the second tier when a shocking piece of news hit the soccer world: Foggia and Verona were being investigated for an alleged match-fixing. The judicial proceedings ended with the relegation of both teams to Serie B, while Samp was readmitted by right to Serie A.

==== The return of Lolli Ghetti and the downward phase ====
The return of Glauco Lolli Ghetti as club president coincided with the departure of Vincenzi and the arrival of new coach Giulio Corsini. The team had been prepared to face the second tier; consequently, good players left who were not, however, replaced: only Lippi and Arnuzzo remained to worthily represent the Genoese team. At the end of the 1974-1975 season a good twelfth place came at the end, which meant salvation: this was obtained with two days to go, so the defeat on the last day against Fiorentina by 4-3 did not prove decisive for the purposes of the fight against relegation. Credit for the season's good performances went to "Grandpa" Maraschi, an experienced forward who netted seven goals in 24 games: it was up to him to make up for the inefficiency of the blucerchiati forwards, especially the two starting ones, Magistrelli and Prunecchi, who scored only two goals apiece.

The following year, Sampdoria's president replaced Corsini with Eugenio Bersellini, who had the merit of leading the team to safety. In addition, Lippi, starting defender, was out for a long time due to injury: as a result, he played 14 games, which also included a goal. After a disastrous start, Sampdoria acquired from Milan, in November, the sweeper Zecchini, whose arrival was fundamental to guarantee a minimum of stability to the defense. As for the offensive sector, the newcomer Nello Saltutti, author of eight goals, did very well: after him, Magistrelli's six goals were noteworthy, thus improving the previous year's tally.

==== The relegation to Serie B ====
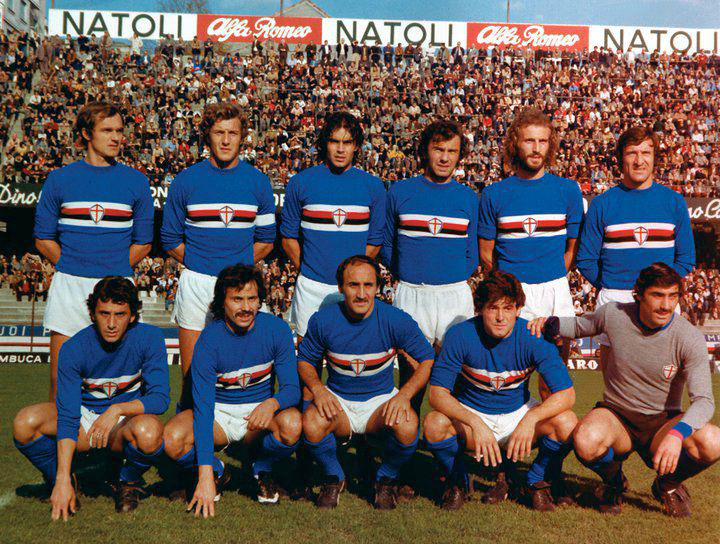
The line-up against Lazio, day four of the 1976-77 season (31 October 1976), which ended with relegation to Serie B. Standing: Callioni, Lippi, Bresciani, Savoldi II, Zecchini, Bedin. Crouching: Arnuzzo, Saltutti, Valente, Orlandi, Cacciatori.

After the poor results of his second management of the club, Lolli Ghetti did not seem particularly upset, and instead of strengthening the team, as all the Sampdoria fans expected, he sold striker Magistrelli and defender Nicolini. In their place, the usual players of high hopes arrived, but they did not bring any benefit to Sampdoria: among them, only Gianluigi Savoldi and the young Chiorri, who came from the youth academy, are remembered. The few reinforcements were not enough for Bersellini to build a team capable of aspiring to a good position in the standings; already at the beginning of the season, which coincided with the 30th anniversary of the foundation of the club, Doria's fans were already fearing that the following year would be the year of relegation: they were not wrong. In twenty days, the team obtained only thirteen points; it was given up for dead, when a reaction of pride saw Samp record a positive streak of ten matches, which yielded thirteen points: however, the two final defeats at the hands of Bologna and Juventus turned out to be fatal, and so, after a few years in the top division, Sampdoria was relegated to Serie B in 1977.

==== Lolli Ghetti's abandonment ====
After relegation to the second tier, Sampdoria fans were convinced that Lolli Ghetti would do everything to try to regain their trust. Instead, only Lippi and Arnuzzo were reconfirmed, and the only quality arrivals came from the youth team, which had recently put itself in the limelight by winning the Viareggio Tournament for the fourth time: as for the coach, Bersellini was sent away, and in his place came the "wizard" of Viareggio, Giorgio Canali: on the other hand, the role of general manager was taken over by former Sampdoria coach Bernardini.

The first season in Serie B turned out to be rather bitter; after a difficult start, characterized by three 0-0 and a few wins, the blucerchiati experienced an up-and-down period, made up of few victories and many lost points. In the middle of the season, in February, continuous protests from the fans pushed Lolli Ghetti to resign, effectively ending a cycle: in his place came Edmondo Costa, who certainly had no intention of investing in the club. However, with a few days to go, when they were fighting for promotion, the team was unable to withstand the intense pressure from the fans and the press. At the decisive moment of the year, Sampdoria did not win a single game, thus losing the ticket for promotion taken instead by Ascoli, Catanzaro and Avellino; the latter achieved promotion on the very last day against Samp: with a 1-0 victory at the Luigi Ferraris, the Campania team reached the 44-point mark and surpassed Monza by two points, which was stuck at 42. The only positive notes of the season were the good performances of two youngsters from the academy, Chiorri and Re.

==== 1979: Paolo Mantovani as president ====
The 1978 transfer window turned out to be marked by savings. The policy implemented by the club brought, at the beginning of the season, disastrous results, which cost Canali his job, replaced by Lamberto Giorgis. Giorgis managed to lead the team, which was very weak and unable to react to the numerous critics, to salvation: the ninth place finish constituted Sampdoria's worst result in its entire history. The blucerchiati fans questioned Costa, who took the right opportunity to sell the club: on July 3, 1979, Sampdoria was officially bought by a Roman oilman, Paolo Mantovani. As soon as he arrived in Genoa, he claimed that his goal was to bring Doria back to Serie A and lead it to the Scudetto victory. Such statements were a source of amusement to many, but Mantovani's intentions were immediately clear: he operated a real revolution within the club. As for the roster, Marcello Lippi, Savoldi, Re, Tuttino, and Chiarugi left, while many new players arrived, including Logozzo, Sartori, Pezzella, Redomi, Caccia, Venturini, Genzano, Piacenti, and youngsters Navone, Poggi, and Massimo Lippi, coming from the youth sector. Claudio Nassi was appointed sporting director, while Lamberto Giorgis was confirmed as coach. The beginning of the championship was not the best: after the defeats against Como and Palermo and the draw in the derby, Mantovani decided to send Giorgis away and replace him with Lauro Toneatto: after a start consisting of several draws, the new coach led the team to regain several positions, until reaching the seventh final place.

=== 1980s and 1990s: from the rise to the "Sampd'oro" ===
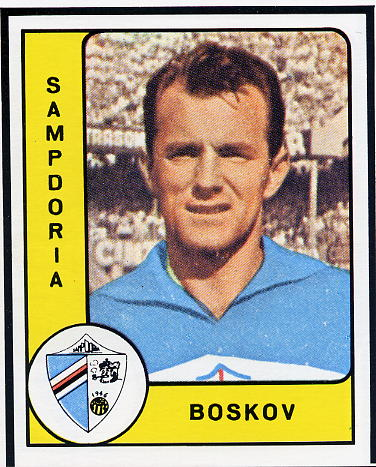
Vujadin Boškov was the coach of Sampdoria from 1986 to 1992.

==== 1980-1982: the return to Serie A ====
Paolo Mantovani, in the summer of 1980, did not confirm Toneatto as coach: in his place, he hired Enzo Riccomini. As far as the team was concerned, he made a second revolution in just two years; he sold many of the players he had acquired the previous year, and replaced them with many young players, including Luca Pellegrini, Fausto Salsano and Pietro Vierchowod (the last two later sent out on loan): their arrival was balanced by that of rather experienced players, such as Luigi Delneri and goalkeeper Guido Bistazzoni. Sampdoria's start to the season was satisfactory, but too inconsistent for the club to be in contention for promotion; however, by mid-season, Doria made a strong move towards the top of the standings, eventually finishing in fifth place.

The 1981 transfer window was marked by yet another revolution: President Mantovani sold thirteen players and bought as many. Riccomini, unable to manage a constantly changing roster, was fired after a bad start to the season: in his place came young Renzo Ulivieri, who, after a difficult start, managed to lead the team to the long-awaited promotion. The second place finish, tied with Pisa and behind Verona, thus brought Samp back to the top flight after a five-year stint in Serie B.

==== 1982-1984: two years of adjustment ====
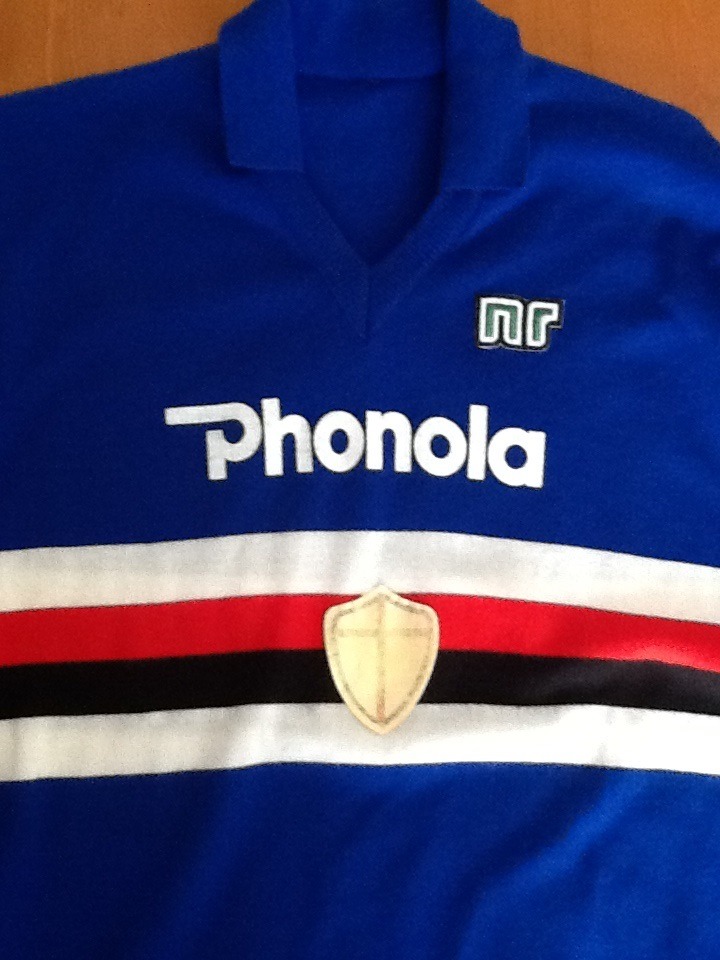
Sampdoria 1982-1983 Jersey

The summer of 1982 saw Mantovani invest large sums in the market, attempting to close the gap that separated the blucerchiati from the top-ranked teams. Of particular note were the arrivals of Francis and Brady in addition to the gamble on Roberto Mancini: the still underage striker had only one season in the Serie A under his belt, played the year before with the Bologna jersey. Coach Ulivieri was confirmed, while Paolo Borea took Claudio Nassi's place as sporting director. The good transfer window put in place by Mantovani and the stability of the club made the number of season tickets increase, which exceeded 12,000; moreover, that year would be remembered by an average home attendance of around 35,000. The championship even began with 3 consecutive victories: the opponents were - in order - Juventus, Inter and Roma. Despite the initial exploit, the Dorians were unable to keep up with the big teams and the season reserved for them a seventh place. The same placement was repeated the following year, in which successes against Inter and Juventus were again recorded.

==== The golden decade 1984-1994: cups, European finals and a historic Scudetto ====
Another important piece was put in place in 1984, with the purchase of Gianluca Vialli from Cremonese. At the end of the season, after having achieved a positive fourth place in Serie A (a position previously obtained only in 1961), the doriani won the Coppa Italia for the first time. The trophy was won by overcoming Milan in the two-legged final, winning 1-0 in the first leg (away) and 2-1 in the return. The achievement meant, in 1985-86, the debut in UEFA competitions: Sampdoria disputed the European Cup Winners' Cup, losing to Benfica in the round of 16. As consolation for a disappointing championship (finished with 4 points over the relegation zone), another success in the Coppa Italia was narrowly missed: however, Roma beat the Ligurians, with an aggregate score of 3-2.

In 1986, Boškov was hired, with the player roster reshuffled by Briegel and Cerezo. Between the goalposts, young Pagliuca, who was 19 years old at the time, was targeted.

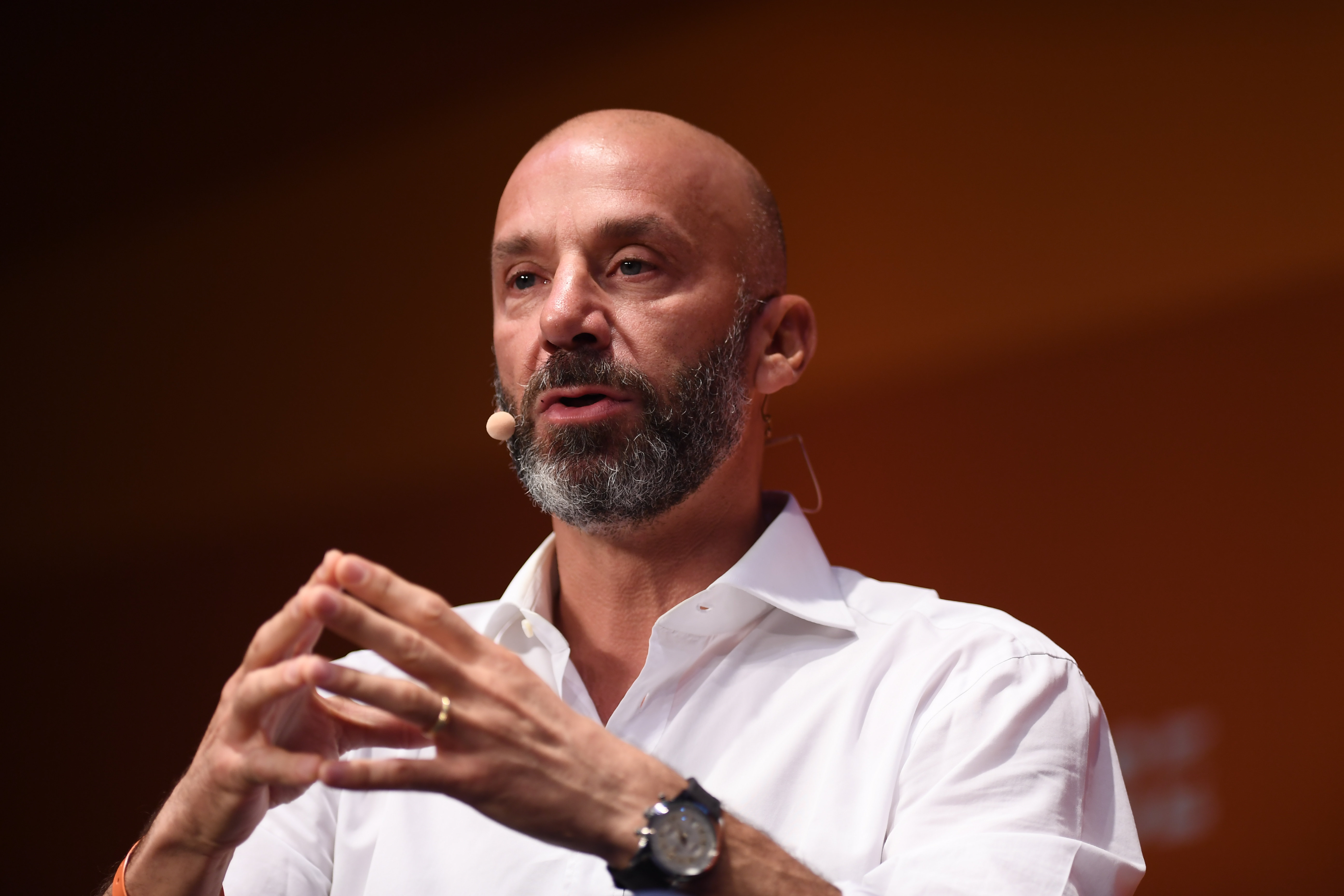
Gianluca Vialli, one of Sampdoria's icons

The first part of the 1986-87 championship was unsteady, but in the second half the Ligurians obtained an impressive 20 points: only title-winning Napoli managed to do better (21). The play-off lost to AC Milan deprived the Dorians of the European cups for the 1987-88 year, in which the club's finances were hard hit: the cause involved the renovation of the stadium, in view of the 1990 World Cup. Despite the economic situation, there was no shortage of sporting satisfaction: placed fourth in Serie A, Sampdoria won the national cup against Torino.

The trophy qualified the Genoese for the 1988-89 European Cup Winners' Cup, the final of which they lost (2-0) to Barcelona; it also gave them the right to participate in the Italian Super Cup, a newly established competition, which was won for the first time by AC Milan (Italian champions in 1988), which defeated the blucerchiati 3-1. Only two weeks later, however, the defense of the Coppa Italia successfully materialized: beating Napoli 4-0 (thus overturning the 0-1 in the first leg match), Sampdoria inscribed its name in the annals of the tournament for the second year in a row. It was, overall, their third victory. The list of trophies was further enriched in 1989-90 when, in the face of 5th place in the league and another defeat in the Super Cup (this time at the hands of Inter), the team asserted itself for the first time in the international arena. The European Cup Winners' Cup was won, defeating Anderlecht with a double by Vialli.

The European triumph allowed Sampdoria to contend, in the autumn of 1990, for the UEFA Super Cup against Milan, which had won the European Cup: the outcome of the double challenge rewarded the rossoneri, due to the 1-1 draw in the first leg and the 2-0 Milanese win in the return.

At the beginning of 1991, the team, up to that point well on its way in the league, suffered a decline: it lost to Torino and Lecce, leaving the winter title to be seized by Inter. The quality of the blucerchiati emerged, however, in the second phase, as they did not record any defeats in 17 matches. By beating both sides from Milan in direct confrontations, the top of the standings was conquered, with the arithmetic victory of the title on May 19, 1991: the 3-0 win over Lecce, with all goals scored in the first half of the game, was what awarded the triumph.

The architects of the triumph - chased for a decade by then - were, in addition to Boškov, the "goal twins" Vialli and Mancini (the former being the top scorer with 19 goals), goalkeeper Pagliuca (who on the occasion of the home win over Inter saved Matthäus's penalty), Vierchowod, Mannini, Dossena, Cerezo and Katanec. The season ended by losing the Coppa Italia to Roma: in August, the same giallorossi were beaten as Sampdoria won the Italian Super Cup.

In the 1991-92 championship, the blucerchiati quickly failed to defend the title, but focused their efforts on Europe. On their debut in the European Cup, they eliminated Rosenborg and Honvéd to advance to the group stage, where among other results a victory (3-1) at the field of Red Star, the cup holders, stood out. Having gained entry to the final, the Dorians found themselves facing Barcelona: a Koeman goal in extra time bent the Ligurian resistance, but the defeat did not undermine the good things Sampdoria had accomplished during the season. On the last day of the championship, a home draw with Cremonese (2-2) cost them qualification for the continental cups for 1992-93.

===== Mantovani's demise: last successes and decline =====
In the summer of 1992, Sven-Göran Eriksson arrived as coach: among the signings, the young Serbian Vladimir Jugović stood out. The 1992-93 season was the first in five years to end without any trophies: the Dorians finished only seventh in the league, peaking with a derby victory (4-1) on November 1, 1992.

Ruud Gullit, Alberico Evani and David Platt joined the squad for the 1993-94 season. On the other hand, Vialli, who was bought by Juventus, bid farewell. Mantovani's death on October 14, 1993, effectively marked the end of an era. The presidency was taken over by his son Enrico, while on the field the team finished fourth in the league. The Coppa Italia was then won against Ancona, a trophy destined to remain the last for years to come.

In 1994-95 Walter Zenga and Riccardo Ferri, both taken from Inter, as well as Siniša Mihajlović from Roma, were added to the squad. It was precisely the Serbian, on his debut with the new jersey, who missed the penalty that cost the Italian Super Cup: the doriani lost to AC Milan, after extra time had ended on a 1-1 scoreline (with goals by Gullit - who returned to Milan - and Miha himself). Shots from the penalty spot also proved fatal in the Cup Winners' Cup, where the Ligurian side lost in the semifinals to Arsenal. Sampdoria did not go beyond eighth place in the league, a position also achieved in 1995-96.

A surge occurred the following year, when the blucerchiati finished sixth while registering the best attack of the tournament (60 goals). After qualifying for the UEFA Cup, Mancini left Genoa to settle at Lazio, followed by Eriksson. 1997-98 was supposed to be - in the fans' intentions - a year of success, thanks also to a good transfer window: Boghossian and Klinsmann wore the blucerchiata jersey, but the European adventure ended as early as September. The ninth place in the league was barely worth the entry into the Intertoto Cup, where their compatriots Bologna were the ones to oust - in the second round - the doriani.

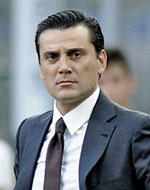
Vincenzo Montella made 116 appearances and scored 66 goals for Sampdoria between the 1990s and 2000s, before taking charge of the club in the 2015-2016 season.

The 1998-99 tournament proved to be unsuccessful, despite the presence on the field of Ortega (Argentine national team) and the tactical guidance of the experienced Luciano Spalletti. In the first half of the season, the team earned only 15 points, while in the second half it earned 22: what condemned the doriani to the fall to Serie B, for the first time in two decades, was the 2-2 draw against Bologna on the penultimate day.

=== 2000s: the revival ===
==== 1999-2003: the four-year period in Serie B ====
In the 1999-00 and 2000-01 championships, Sampdoria finished fifth, missing a return to the top flight by a handful of points. In 2001, the club was also fined 3 billion for its involvement in the passport scandal. Also in that summer, businessman Riccardo Garrone took over the club, avoiding its disqualification from the championships due to the serious economic deficit. Having averted relegation in the following championship, thanks mainly to Flachi's goals, Sampdoria set its sights on promotion.

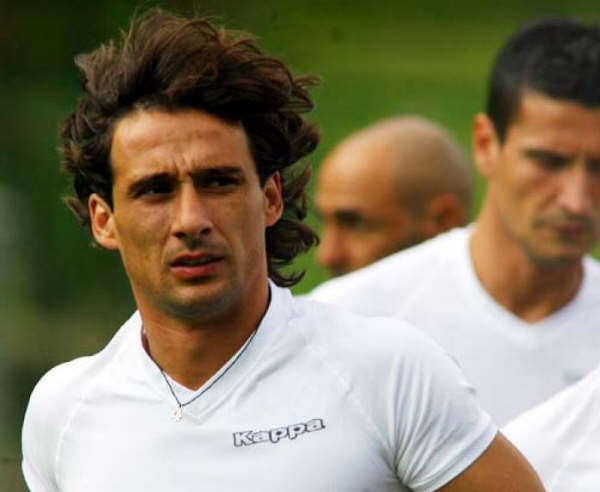
Sergio Volpi, captain of Sampdoria from 2002 to 2007.

The striker's goals, along with those of other players, notably captain Volpi and Bettarini, were crucial in keeping the club at the top of the table. The rise to Serie A was realized in May 2003, with a second-place finish.

==== 2003-2007: from the return to Serie A to Europe ====
Still led by Novellino, who had already been the architect of promotion, Sampdoria immediately came close to European qualification in its first year. The blucerchiati finished eighth in the standings, with a 3-1 defeat at the hands of Udinese preventing them from qualifying for the UEFA Cup. The placement would have been worth participation in the Intertoto, but the club - mindful of the negative record dating back 6 years earlier - decided to forgo it.

The 2004-05 championship saw the doriani compete again for the continental cups, but in the final stages of the tournament the draw with the Friulians and the defeat to Inter (in which the team hit the post three times) made Sampdoria drop to fifth place, thus missing entry into the Champions League. Strengthened by the arrival of Bonazzoli, in 2005-06 the team took part in the UEFA Cup but did not get past the group stage. In the championship, the blucerchiati manifested a serious crisis of results, so much so that the last victory was obtained on February 12, 2006. There were 8 draws and 5 defeats in the following 3 months. The tournament ended with the 3-0 loss suffered at Marassi by Lecce, a match in which the fans decided - as a sign of protest - to turn their backs on the field.

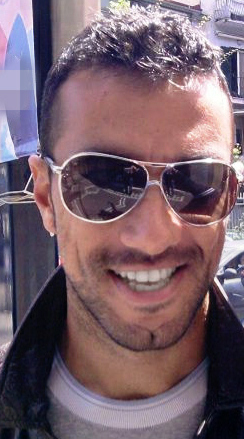
Fabio Quagliarella, who scored 13 goals for Genoa in the 2006-2007 season and played for Sampdoria from 2016 to 2023.

Sampdoria returned to winning ways in Serie A only in October 2006, breaking a 17-game losing streak against Parma. However, the championship did not bring much satisfaction. The exception was the arrival of Fabio Quagliarella, whom the Genoese had bought from Ascoli. On the negative side, the Flachi episode stood out: the player was first suspended by the Sports Tribunal for his involvement in a betting ring and then banned for 16 months in 2007 for testing positive for cocaine. As for the affairs of the field, the final position was ninth place.

==== Mazzarri's two-year tenure (2007-2009) ====
For the 2007-08 season, the Genoese club appointed Walter Mazzarri as their coach, who had just returned from a three-year spell of salvation at the helm of Reggina. Palombo received the captain's armband, with Montella and Bellucci returning to Genoa. In the Intertoto Cup, the blucerchiati eliminated Cherno More Varna with an aggregate of 2-0, gaining access to the UEFA Cup's second qualifying round. After the acquisition of Cassano, Sampdoria also beat Hajduk Split, entering the tournament's first round. Qualification to the group stage failed against AaB, due to a double draw (2-2 home, 0-0 away). In the league the Ligurians had a positive performance, especially at home: there were as many as 6 home wins by 3-0 scores. Winning access to the 2008-09 UEFA Cup with one day in advance, the team finished in sixth place.

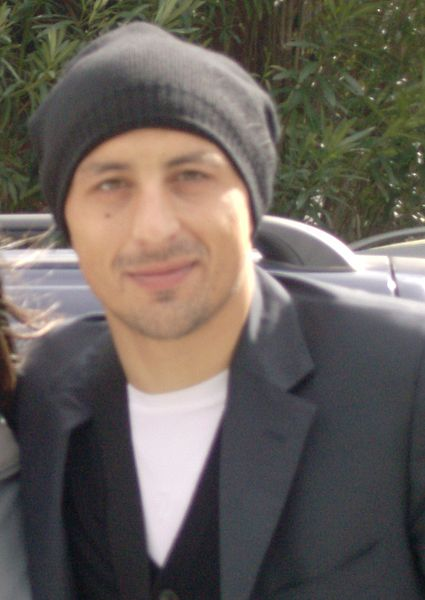
Angelo Palombo, one of Sampdoria's flagship players in the early 21st century, scored 15 goals in 459 appearances between 2002 and 2017.

In the summer of 2008, Bruno Fornaroli arrived to reinforce the attack. In Europe, the doriani easily passed the preliminary round and with some difficulty the group stage. In the winter market, the squad was further improved with the arrival of Pazzini. With the cup adventure ended in the round of 16, the Ligurians redeemed themselves by reaching the final of the Coppa Italia. Finishing thirteenth in the league, losing both derbies, the blucerchiati's remaining hopes of qualifying for Europe were tied to the trophy. However, Sampdoria lost out to Lazio on penalties after Cassano and Campagnaro missed from the spot to end extra time 1-1. At the end of the season, Mazzarri announced his farewell to the club.

=== Years 2010 and 2020 ===
==== 2009-2010: the return to the Champions League and various records ====
Mazzarri's departure was followed by the immediate arrival of Luigi Delneri. The new coach debuted by winning 6-2 against Lecce, in the third round of the Coppa Italia. In the league, the blucerchiati made an unexpected start, leading the standings with 15 points after 6 matches. The stay at the top lasted just a week, then giving way to a decline: in the remaining 13 matches of the first half of the season, the doriani earned only 11 points of the 39 available, and were eliminated by Livorno in the cup.

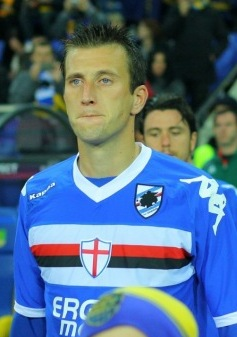
Daniele Gastaldello, Sampdoria defender from 2007-2015.

Halfway through the season, the environment was further shaken by the controversy between Cassano and Delneri: the case escalated after the player's exclusion from the match against Udinese, which was a technical decision by the coach. The Bari native was replaced by Nicola Pozzi but, despite his absence, the Genoese obtained 5 victories in 7 matches. Upon reinstatement, however, Cassano proved to be a decisive player: the victories over Juventus, in the derby and against Milan were all down to his goals. After beating Roma with a double by Pazzini, Sampdoria kept alive their goal of fourth place: the defeat of the giallorossi, moreover, would cost them the Scudetto. The draw against Palermo, also a positive surprise of the tournament, left the Ligurians ahead by two points on the 37th day. The return to the Champions League materialized on the last Sunday, with the victory over Napoli signed by a goal by Pazzini. Equaling the placing of 2004-05, which had earned the first access to the tournament after the name change, the doriani even improved the score (67 to 61), establishing the record for a single season. Throughout the tournament, the team also stood out as having the best home defence in Europe, conceding just 10 goals at the Marassi, compared to at least 11 for the likes of Barcelona and Manchester United.

==== 2010-2011: the unexpected fall to Serie B ====
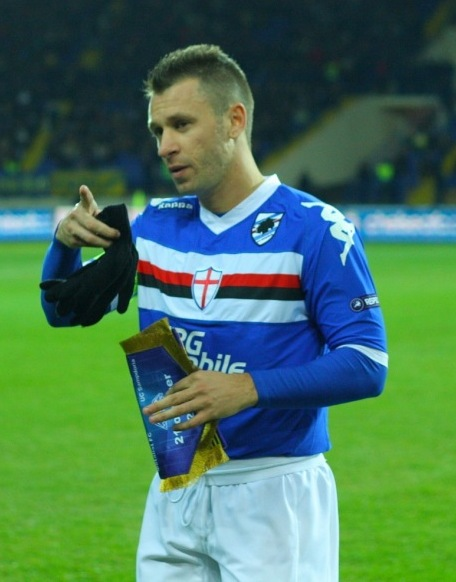
Antonio Cassano as Sampdoria captain

After only one season, Delneri left Genoa and was replaced by Domenico Di Carlo. In August, Sampdoria knew the name of the opponent they had to overcome to enter the Champions League group stage: the Germans of Werder Bremen. The first leg match, in Germany, was won 3-1 by the green-and-whites: Sampdoria's goal was scored by Pazzini, who kept the fans' hopes alight. Obliged to win in the return leg by two goals, Sampdoria came close to the feat: a double by Pazzo and a goal by Cassano brought the score to 3-0, but Rosenberg scored in the second half the goal that made the match go into extra time. Claudio Pizarro's 3-2 goal ended their European dreams and handed qualification to the Germans.

The elimination in the cup was only the prelude to a difficult season, which in the fall would also see the exclusion of Cassano from the roster after the player had insulted president Garrone. Confined to a mid-table position in the league table, the team was also eliminated from the Europa League. Moreover, having lost its attacking pair in the winter market, with Pazzini and Cassano both moving to Milan, the team finished in the bottom half of the table. The penultimate day's match against Palermo, which had already been a decisive game for European qualification the year before, was mathematically the last straw. The 2-1 win by the rosanero, combined with Lecce's victory against Bari, pushed the blucerchiati into the Serie B 12 years after their last relegation.

==== 2011-2012: the immediate ascent ====
To attempt the immediate ascent, Sampdoria bet on Gianluca Atzori. However, the coach was exonerated because of the disappointing start in the league, which led the Ligurians to the bottom half of the standings. He was thus replaced by Giuseppe Iachini, who, thanks also to substantial investments in the January market, managed to get the Ligurians back on the right track.

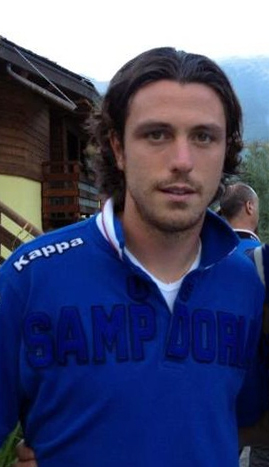
Nicola Pozzi, a striker for Sampdoria from 2009 to 2014 and a key player in the club's return to Serie A in the 2011-2012 season.

The goal of sixth place, with the consequent participation in the play-offs, was achieved thanks to a goal by young Mauro Icardi: the Argentine, on his debut, scored the decisive goal against Juve Stabia. In the semifinal of the play-off, the Genoese got the better of Sassuolo with a total score of 3-2. Promotion, after only 12 months, was then achieved by beating Varese: the doriani won 3-2 in the first leg, and then imposed themselves by a narrow margin in the return match (0-1).

==== 2012-2014: the two consecutive salvations under Garrone ====
The 2012-13 championship, with Delio Rossi as coach, began with a one-point deduction, which the team immediately overturned by winning at home against AC Milan. A 2-1 win over Italian champions Juventus followed at the end of the first half of the season. The goals that defeated the bianconeri were scored by Icardi, who made his name known to Italian soccer in this season. In February 2013, Edoardo Garrone replaced his father, who died at the beginning of the year, as president. The doriani celebrated a quiet salvation, among other things taking the satisfaction of beating Juventus again on the last day.

Even after the sale of Icardi to Inter, in the 2013-14 championship, the Genoese repeated their success in avoiding relegation.

==== 2014-2020: Ferrero's presidency, from success to early difficulties ====
In the summer of 2014, under pressure from the rest of the Garrone-Mondini family, Edoardo Garrone announced the free transfer of the controlling stake in Unione Calcio Sampdoria to the only buyer that had come forward, Roman businessman Massimo Ferrero's Sport Spettacolo Holding srl, which thus took over from San Quirico spa; Ferrero himself was appointed president. The new management, while taking on past debts, also benefited from an endowment from the previous owner (who for some time retained 1 percent of the company shares) of about 65.4 million euros, aimed at ensuring business continuity.

The new owner, who expressed determination to provide the club with a stadium of its own, showed a histrionic and exuberant personality uncharacteristic of the previous owners' measured calmness, which earned him wide popularity even outside of football.

The league results saw the blucerchiati compete - surprisingly - for a place in the Europa League, surpassing the Milanese in the standings. Partly due to the judicial vicissitudes of their cousins Genoa, who were not granted a Uefa license, Sampdoria entered the tournament's third qualifying round with their seventh-place finish. The 2015-16 season began, however, with an early European elimination as early as August, at the hands of Vojvodina. The poor start to the season cost Walter Zenga his job and he was replaced by Vincenzo Montella at the November break; the former Dorian striker led the team to salvation, with just 2 points more than third-last-placed Carpi.

In 2016-17, coached by Marco Giampaolo, the Genoese finished in tenth place. Also in the following season, again coached by Giampaolo, they would finish 10th, despite a first half of the season in which they were in contention for European qualification. In the 2018-2019 season, the team would try until the last minute to earn a place in the European cups, failing to do so and finishing the season in 9th place. They did, however, have the satisfaction of seeing one of their players, Fabio Quagliarella, finish as the tournament's top scorer with 26 goals. At the end of the season Giampaolo left the Genoese team after 3 years characterized by good play and with the merit of having introduced many players such as Lucas Torreira, Bruno Fernandes, Patrik Schick, Milan Škriniar, Luis Muriel, Duván Zapata and Dennis Praet.

For the 2019-2020 season, Sampdoria set its sights on coach Eusebio Di Francesco, but he terminated his contract after just 7 matches, with the team in last place with only 3 points and in the middle of the relegation zone. In his place came Claudio Ranieri, who managed to save the team with 4 days in advance and ending the season in 15th place with 42 points, despite the difficulties caused by the COVID-19 pandemic, during which the Genoa team remained the most affected in Serie A with 11 infected players. With Ranieri's confirmation, the following season was spent quietly, navigating in the standings always far from the relegation zone: Sampdoria ended the championship in 9th place with 52 points, after which the Roman coach (who had also negotiated a renewal with the club) announced his resignation.

==== 2020-2023: crisis and the end of the Ferrero era ====
In the meantime, the club saw a progressive deterioration of its corporate situation: in 2019 a negotiation (also advocated by former owner Edoardo Garrone) to sell Sampdoria to a US group, represented by former blucerchiato player Gianluca Vialli, had failed. This setback came on top of the exhaustion of the resources the club had available in 2014 to guarantee business continuity, the backlash of the pandemic crisis and the vicissitudes of owner Massimo Ferrero, who resigned from the presidency in December 2021 (former player Marco Lanna was appointed to succeed him) following his arrest and subsequent indictment for certain offenses related to other companies he owned. A year earlier, however, Ferrero had transferred the shares in Sport Spettacolo Holding (U.C. Sampdoria's parent company) to the Rosan Trust, managed by Trust Services srl and controlled by his own "confidant" Gianluca Vidal, in order to separate the club from the rest of his assets and with the declared aim of selling it, also to raise funds with which to cushion the crisis of his other companies.

In this situation, the team (built with few resources) played a poor season in 2021-2022, with a real risk of relegation, which was then avoided by the change of coach between Roberto D'Aversa and the returning Marco Giampaolo, who eventually finished in 15th place.

The corporate crisis also turned into a sporting one in the 2022-2023 season, which saw Sampdoria confined to the bottom three places from the very beginning: the exoneration of Giampaolo in favor of Dejan Stanković would not prevent the blucerchiati from mathematically being relegated to Serie B with four days to go before the end of the championship. At the same time, at the beginning of 2023, the club, whose economic situation was by then clearly in deficit, was having difficulty meeting its obligations to its employees, and requested and obtained from the Court of Genoa the opening of a 120-day negotiated settlement to try to restructure the debt (quantified in March 2023 at about 200 million euros) and find a buyer. The Board of Directors, led by President Lanna, was in dialogue with several potential investors and at the same time (also at their suggestion) tried to find solutions to restructure the debt and to carry out a capital increase, even with external resources (a hypothesis that Ferrero personally opposed).

The situation then led to the indignation of the supporters, who carried out various demonstrations against Ferrero and other members of the organisation, as well as against Edoardo Garrone and his family, who were accused of selling Sampdoria without sufficiently checking the seriousness of the buyer and of being reluctant to rush to the club's rescue, and against the governing bodies of Italian football.

In order to save the club (which, in May, was in real danger of being expelled from the league and ceasing to exist) Gestio Capital and Aser Holding intervened in the person of owners Matteo Manfredi and Andrea Radrizzani (former Leeds Utd patron), who, through the new company Blucerchiati srl. partially rescheduled their debts and underwrote a bond convertible into shares for a maximum value of €30 million (which allowed Massimo Ferrero's Sport Spettacolo Holding to acquire a majority stake in the club), allowing Sampdoria's board to recapitalise and register the team for the 2023-2024 Serie B season. In August 2023, Blucerchiati, the parent company, was transformed into a joint stock company and fully acquired by Gestio Capital: at the same time, the Board of Directors was renewed, with Marco Lanna becoming Chairman and Manfredi joining the Board of Directors.

== See also ==
- UC Sampdoria
