= List of UC Sampdoria seasons =

UC Sampdoria is an Italian professional football club based in Genoa, Liguria, who play their matches in Stadio Luigi Ferraris. The club was formed in 1946 after a fusion between Sampierdarenese and Andrea Doria, and the club's formal debut in an official league was also in 1946.

The club has won the Serie A once, Serie B twice, the Coppa Italia four times, the Supercoppa Italiana once and the UEFA Cup Winners' Cup once.

Sampdoria has played 66 seasons in the Serie A, 13 seasons in the Serie B, 0 seasons in the Serie C (or equivalent), 0 seasons in the Serie D (or equivalent) and 0 seasons in lower competitions.

This list details the club's achievements in major competitions, and the top scorers for each season. Top scorers in bold were also the top scorers in the Italian league that season. Records of local or regional competitions are not included due to them being considered of less importance.

== Key ==
- Pld = Matches played
- W = Matches won
- D = Matches drawn
- L = Matches lost
- GF = Goals for
- GA = Goals against
- Pts = Points
- Pos = Final position
- Serie A = 1st Tier in Italian League
- Serie B = 2nd Tier in Italian League
- Serie C = 3rd Tier in Italian League
- Prima Categoria = 1st Tier until 1922
- Promozione = 2nd Tier until 1922
- Prima Divisione = 1st Tier until 1926
- Prima Divisione = 2nd Tier (1926–1929)
- Seconda Divisione = 2nd Tier until 1926
- Seconda Divisione = 3rd Tier (1926–1929)
- Divisione Nazionale = 1st Tier (1926–1929)
- RU = Runners-up
- SF = Semi-finals
- QF = Quarter-finals
- R16 = Last 16
- R32 = Last 32
- QR1 = First qualifying round
- QR2 = Second qualifying round
- QR3 = Third qualifying round
- PO = Play-Offs
- 1R = Round 1
- 2R = Round 2
- 3R = Round 3
- GS = Group stage
- 2GS = Second group stage
- EC = European Cup (1955–1992)
- UCL = UEFA Champions League (1993–present)
- CWC = UEFA Cup Winners' Cup (1960–1999)
- UC = UEFA Cup (1971–2008)
- UEL = UEFA Europa League (2009–present)
- USC = UEFA Super Cup
- INT = Intercontinental Cup (1960–2004)
- WC = FIFA Club World Cup (2005–present)

**Winners**	Runners-up	Promoted	Relegated	1st Tier	2nd Tier	3rd Tier	4th Tier	5th Tier	6th Tier	7th Tier	8th Tier

== Seasons ==
Results of league and cup competitions by season
Season	Division	Pld	W	D	L	GF	GA	Pts	Pos	Cup	Supercoppa Italiana	Cup	Result	Player(s)	Goals
Season	League									Cup	Supercoppa Italiana	UEFA – FIFA		Top goalscorer(s)	
2025–26	Serie B (2)	38	11	11	16	35	48	44	13th	R1				Massimo Coda	9
2024–25	Serie B (2)	38	8	17	13	38	49	41	17th	R16				Massimo Coda	8
2023–24	Serie B (2)	38	16	9	13	53	50	55	7th	R2				Manuel De Luca	10
2022–23	Serie A (1)	38	3	10	25	24	71	19	20th	R16				Manolo Gabbiadini	7
2021–22	Serie A (1)	38	10	6	22	46	63	36	15th	R16				Francesco Caputo	11
2020–21	Serie A (1)	38	15	7	16	52	54	52	9th	4R				Fabio Quagliarella	13
2019–20	Serie A (1)	38	12	6	20	48	65	42	15th	4R				Fabio Quagliarella	12
2018–19	Serie A (1)	38	15	8	15	60	51	53	9th	R16				**Fabio Quagliarella**	26
2017–18	Serie A (1)	38	16	6	16	56	60	54	10th	R16				Fabio Quagliarella	19
2016–17	Serie A (1)	38	12	12	14	49	55	48	10th	R16				Fabio Quagliarella	12
2015–16	Serie A (1)	38	10	10	18	48	61	40	15th	R16		UEL	QR3	Éder	13
2014–15	Serie A (1)	38	13	17	8	48	42	56	7th	R16				Éder	12
2013–14	Serie A (1)	38	12	9	17	48	62	45	12th	R16				Éder	12
2012–13	Serie A (1)	38	11	10	17	43	51	42	14th	3R				Mauro Icardi	10
2011–12	Serie B (2)	42	17	16	9	53	34	67	6th	3R				Nicola Pozzi	19
2010–11	Serie A (1)	38	8	12	18	33	49	36	18th	QF		UCL UEL	PO GS	Giampaolo Pazzini	12
2009–10	Serie A (1)	38	19	10	9	49	41	67	4th	4R				Giampaolo Pazzini	21
2008–09	Serie A (1)	38	11	13	14	49	52	46	13th	RU		UC	R32	Antonio Cassano Giampaolo Pazzini	15
2007–08	Serie A (1)	38	17	9	12	56	46	60	6th	QF		UC	1R	Claudio Bellucci	13
2006–07	Serie A (1)	38	13	10	15	44	48	49	9th	SF				Fabio Quagliarella	14
2005–06	Serie A (1)	38	10	11	17	47	51	41	12th	QF		UC	GS	Francesco Flachi	15
2004–05	Serie A (1)	38	17	10	11	42	29	61	5th	QF				Francesco Flachi	14
2003–04	Serie A (1)	34	11	13	10	40	42	46	8th	R16				Fabio Bazzani	13
2002–03	Serie B (2)	38	17	16	5	53	31	67	2nd	R16				Fabio Bazzani	17
2001–02	Serie B (2)	38	12	12	14	42	46	48	11th	R16				Francesco Flachi	20
2000–01	Serie B (2)	38	16	16	6	60	38	64	5th	R16				Francesco Flachi	19
1999–2000	Serie B (2)	38	17	11	10	45	40	62	5th	2R				Francesco Flachi	12
1998–99	Serie A (1)	34	9	10	15	38	55	37	16th	R16				Vincenzo Montella	13
1997–98	Serie A (1)	34	13	9	12	52	55	48	9th	R16		UC	R64	Vincenzo Montella	20
1996–97	Serie A (1)	34	14	11	9	60	46	53	6th	2R				Vincenzo Montella	17
1995–96	Serie A (1)	34	14	10	10	59	47	52	8th	R16				Enrico Chiesa	22
1994–95	Serie A (1)	34	13	11	10	51	37	50	8th	3R	RU	CWC	SF	Roberto Mancini	11
1993–94	Serie A (1)	34	18	8	8	64	39	44	4th	**W**				Ruud Gullit	17
1992–93	Serie A (1)	34	12	12	10	50	48	36	7th	2R				Roberto Mancini	15
1991–92	Serie A (1)	34	11	16	7	38	31	38	6th	SF	**W**	EC	RU	Gianluca Vialli	20
1990–91	Serie A (1)	34	20	11	3	57	24	51	**W**	RU		CWC USC	QF RU	**Gianluca Vialli**	23
1989–90	Serie A (1)	34	16	11	7	46	26	43	5th	3R	RU	CWC	**W**	Gianluca Vialli	19
1988–89	Serie A (1)	34	14	11	9	43	25	39	5th	**W**	RU	CWC	RU	Gianluca Vialli	32
1987–88	Serie A (1)	30	13	11	6	41	30	37	4th	**W**				Gianluca Vialli	13
1986–87	Serie A (1)	30	13	9	8	37	21	35	6th	1R				Gianluca Vialli	13
1985–86	Serie A (1)	30	8	11	11	27	25	27	11th	RU		CWC	R16	Roberto Mancini	12
1984–85	Serie A (1)	30	12	13	5	36	21	37	4th	**W**				Trevor Francis	15
1983–84	Serie A (1)	30	12	8	10	36	30	32	7th	QF				Roberto Mancini	10
1982–83	Serie A (1)	30	8	15	7	31	30	31	7th	GS				Alessandro Scanziani	10
1981–82	Serie B (2)	38	17	13	8	41	25	47	3rd	SF				Alessandro Scanziani Nicola Zanone	10
1980–81	Serie B (2)	38	11	21	6	39	33	43	5th	GS				Gianluca De Ponti	10
1979–80	Serie B (2)	38	10	21	7	33	27	41	7th	GS				Giovanni Sartori	10
1978–79	Serie B (2)	38	9	18	11	37	39	36	9th	GS				Maurizio Orlandi	8
1977–78	Serie B (2)	38	12	14	12	41	37	38	8th	GS				Nello Saltutti	11
1976–77	Serie A (1)	30	6	12	12	28	42	24	14th	GS				Nello Saltutti	7
1975–76	Serie A (1)	30	8	8	14	21	32	24	12th	2R				Sergio Magistrelli Nello Saltutti	13
1974–75	Serie A (1)	30	4	16	10	21	35	24	13th	GS				Mario Maraschi	7
1973–74	Serie A (1)	30	5	13	12	27	34	20	13th	GS				Gianni Improta Mario Maraschi	6
1972–73	Serie A (1)	30	5	14	11	16	25	24	12th	GS				Giancarlo Salvi	7
1971–72	Serie A (1)	30	8	12	10	23	28	28	9th	GS				Ermanno Cristin Dino Spadetto Luis Suárez	5
1970–71	Serie A (1)	30	6	13	11	30	34	25	12th	GS				Ermanno Cristin	10
1969–70	Serie A (1)	30	6	12	12	22	37	24	13th	GS				Romeo Benetti Ermanno Cristin	4
1968–69	Serie A (1)	30	5	13	12	21	27	23	12th	GS				Roberto Vieri	5
1967–68	Serie A (1)	30	6	15	9	27	34	27	10th	1R				Ermanno Cristin Fulvio Francesconi	7
1966–67	Serie B (2)	38	20	14	4	47	19	54	1st	3R				Fulvio Francesconi	21
1965–66	Serie A (1)	34	9	9	16	27	47	27	16th	1R				Mario Frustalupi	8
1964–65	Serie A (1)	34	9	11	14	19	30	29	14th	2R				José Ricardo da Silva	8
1963–64	Serie A (1)	34	10	7	17	38	50	27	15th	2R				Paolo Barison	14
1962–63	Serie A (1)	34	11	8	15	41	50	30	11th	QF				José Ricardo da Silva	13
1961–62	Serie A (1)	34	9	12	13	32	40	30	10th	2R				Sergio Brighenti	9
1960–61	Serie A (1)	34	17	7	10	54	51	41	4th	QF				**Sergio Brighenti**	29
1959–60	Serie A (1)	34	11	13	10	41	46	35	8th	R16				Ernesto Cucchiaroni Lennart Skoglund	10
1958–59	Serie A (1)	34	15	8	11	50	44	38	5th	R16				Aurelio Milani	13
1957–58	Serie A (1)	34	9	12	13	54	62	30	14th	QF				Eddie Firmani	23
1956–57	Serie A (1)	34	12	11	11	59	56	35	7th					Eddie Firmani Ernst Ocwirk	12
1955–56	Serie A (1)	34	12	11	11	51	54	35	7th					Eddie Firmani	17
1954–55	Serie A (1)	34	11	12	11	54	44	34	9th					Giuseppe Baldini Oliviero Conti Pierluigi Ronzon	10
1953–54	Serie A (1)	34	11	12	11	38	40	34	8th					Giuseppe Baldini Oliviero Conti	8
1952–53	Serie A (1)	34	9	13	12	37	43	31	12th					Oliviero Conti	7
1951–52	Serie A (1)	38	16	9	13	48	40	41	7th					Adriano Bassetto	12
1950–51	Serie A (1)	38	12	9	17	51	76	33	12th					Renato Gei	12
1949–50	Serie A (1)	38	13	7	18	62	70	33	13th					Adriano Bassetto	20
1948–49	Serie A (1)	38	16	9	13	74	63	41	5th					Giuseppe Baldini Renato Gei	15
1947–48	Serie A (1)	38	13	10	17	68	63	36	14th					Adriano Bassetto	21
1946–47	Serie A (1)	38	14	8	16	56	52	36	11th					Giuseppe Baldini	18
Total	**Serie A, Divisione Nazionale (1)**	**2,010**	**670**	**647**	**695**	**2,503**	**2,513**	**2,198 (2,657)**	**1x Champ**	**4x** **Coppa**	**1x** **Supercoppa**	**1x**	**UEFA Cup Winners' Cup**	**Gianluca Vialli**	**32**
Total	**Serie B (2)**	**536**	**193**	**209**	**134**	**615**	**515**	**666 (786)**	**2x Champ**					**Fulvio Francesconi**	**21**
