= Derby della Lanterna =

Genoa local derby

- Other names: Genoa Derby, Derby of the Lighthouse
- Location: Genoa, Liguria, Italy
- Teams: Genoa; Sampdoria
- First meeting: 3 November 1946; Serie A Sampdoria 3–0 Genoa
- Latest meeting: 25 September 2024; Coppa Italia; Genoa 1–1 (5–6 p) Sampdoria
- Stadiums: Stadio Luigi Ferraris

Statistics
- Total meetings: 108
- Most wins: Sampdoria (43)
- Largest victory: Sampdoria 5–1 Genoa; Serie A (17 October 1948)

The Derby della Lanterna, Italian for the "Derby of the Lighthouse", is Genoa's local derby, played by Genoa and Sampdoria. It takes place at the Stadio Luigi Ferraris, which both clubs share.

== Background ==
The derby's name is derived from the Torre della Lanterna, the ancient landmark and the main lighthouse for the city's port.

The rivalry is fueled by the fact that Genoa has a long history, being Italy's oldest football club, while Sampdoria is one of the country's newer continuously operating clubs.

It is the oldest derby in Italian football with the first match being played in 1902, when Sampdoria were known as Andrea Doria. 49 matches were played in total between Genoa and this incarnation of Sampdoria, with the former emerging with 30 victories in all competitions, with only eight wins for Andrea Doria.

In 1946, a merger occurred between Sampierdarenese and Andrea Doria to form Sampdoria and the current incarnation of the rivalry began. The first match between Sampdoria and Genoa was held in November 1946 with 45,000 fans and the President of the Republic Enrico De Nicola in attendance. The upstarts Sampdoria won 3–0 as Giuseppe Baldini scored the first goal with a long-range thunderbolt that was so good that Genoa’s Juan Carlos Verdeal went to shake his hand after it crossed the line.

== Statistics ==
As of 25 September 2024

Competition	Played	Genoa wins	Draws	Sampdoria wins	Genoa goals	Sampdoria goals
Serie A	78	19	29	31	80	99
Serie B	16	5	6	5	11	12
Coppa Italia	14	3	5	6	16	17
Total	108	26	40	42	105	128

== Results ==
=== League matches ===
Dates are in dd/mm/yyyy form.

Sampdoria win Draw Genoa win

		Genoa vs Sampdoria			Sampdoria vs Genoa		
Season	Division	Date	Venue	Score	Date	Venue	Score
1946–47	Serie A	03.03.1947	Stadio Luigi Ferraris	2–4	03.11.1946	Stadio Luigi Ferraris	3–0
1947–48	Serie A	16.11.1947	Stadio Luigi Ferraris	2–1	22.04.1948	Stadio Luigi Ferraris	1–1
1948–49	Serie A	06.02.1949	Stadio Luigi Ferraris	0–0	17.10.1948	Stadio Luigi Ferraris	5–1
1949–50	Serie A	09.10.1949	Stadio Luigi Ferraris	0–1	12.02.1950	Stadio Luigi Ferraris	1–1
1950–51	Serie A	22.04.1951	Stadio Luigi Ferraris	2–3	03.12.1950	Stadio Luigi Ferraris	2–1
1954–55	Serie A	10.04.1955	Stadio Luigi Ferraris	1–1	14.11.1954	Stadio Luigi Ferraris	2–2
1955–56	Serie A	23.10.1955	Stadio Luigi Ferraris	2–1	18.03.1956	Stadio Luigi Ferraris	0–0
1956–57	Serie A	17.03.1957	Stadio Luigi Ferraris	1–1	28.10.1957	Stadio Luigi Ferraris	3–2
1957–58	Serie A	01.11.1957	Stadio Luigi Ferraris	3–1	09.03.1958	Stadio Luigi Ferraris	0–0
1958–59	Serie A	29.03.1959	Stadio Luigi Ferraris	0–0	16.11.1958	Stadio Luigi Ferraris	2–1
1959–60	Serie A	15.11.1959	Stadio Luigi Ferraris	1–2	03.04.1960	Stadio Luigi Ferraris	3–0
1962–63	Serie A	14.10.1962	Stadio Luigi Ferraris	2–1	17.02.1963	Stadio Luigi Ferraris	4–1
1963–64	Serie A	22.03.1964	Stadio Luigi Ferraris	0–1	19.01.1964	Stadio Luigi Ferraris	0–1
1964–65	Serie A	22.11.1964	Stadio Luigi Ferraris	2–1	04.04.1965	Stadio Luigi Ferraris	0–1
1966–67	Serie B	12.03.1967	Stadio Luigi Ferraris	1–0	16.10.1966	Stadio Luigi Ferraris	0–0
1973–74	Serie A	25.11.1973	Stadio Luigi Ferraris	0–2	17.03.1974	Stadio Luigi Ferraris	1–1
1976–77	Serie A	07.11.1976	Stadio Luigi Ferraris	1–1	13.03.1977	Stadio Luigi Ferraris	1–2
1978–79	Serie B	18.03.1979	Stadio Luigi Ferraris	0–1	22.10.1978	Stadio Luigi Ferraris	0–2
1979–80	Serie B	28.10.1979	Stadio Luigi Ferraris	0–0	16.03.1980	Stadio Luigi Ferraris	3–2
1980–81	Serie B	10.05.1981	Stadio Luigi Ferraris	1–1	07.12.1980	Stadio Luigi Ferraris	1–1
1982–83	Serie A	28.11.1981	Stadio Luigi Ferraris	1–1	10.04.1982	Stadio Luigi Ferraris	2–2
1983–84	Serie A	18.03.1984	Stadio Luigi Ferraris	0–0	10.04.1982	Stadio Luigi Ferraris	2–0
1989–90	Serie A	01.10.1989	Stadio Luigi Ferraris	1–2	11.02.1990	Stadio Luigi Ferraris	0–0
1990–91	Serie A	25.11.1990	Stadio Luigi Ferraris	0–0	30.03.1991	Stadio Luigi Ferraris	1–2
1991–92	Serie A	27.10.1991	Stadio Luigi Ferraris	0–0	15.03.1992	Stadio Luigi Ferraris	2–2
1992–93	Serie A	28.03.1993	Stadio Luigi Ferraris	0–0	01.11.1992	Stadio Luigi Ferraris	4–1
1993–94	Serie A	05.12.1993	Stadio Luigi Ferraris	1–1	10.04.1994	Stadio Luigi Ferraris	1–1
1994–95	Serie A	30.04.1995	Stadio Luigi Ferraris	2–1	04.12.1994	Stadio Luigi Ferraris	3–2
1999–2000	Serie B	22.10.1999	Stadio Luigi Ferraris	1–1	20.03.2000	Stadio Luigi Ferraris	0–1
2000–01	Serie B	02.04.2001	Stadio Luigi Ferraris	2–0	07.11.2000	Stadio Luigi Ferraris	2–0
2001–02	Serie B	04.11.2001	Stadio Luigi Ferraris	1–0	07.04.2002	Stadio Luigi Ferraris	0–0
2002–03	Serie B	19.04.2003	Stadio Luigi Ferraris	0–2	07.04.2002	Stadio Luigi Ferraris	2–1
2007–08	Serie A	17.02.2008	Stadio Luigi Ferraris	0–0	23.09.2007	Stadio Luigi Ferraris	2–1
2008–09	Serie A	03.05.2009	Stadio Luigi Ferraris	3–1	12.07.2008	Stadio Luigi Ferraris	0–1
2009–10	Serie A	29.11.2009	Stadio Luigi Ferraris	3–0	11.04.2010	Stadio Luigi Ferraris	1–0
2010–11	Serie A	08.05.2011	Stadio Luigi Ferraris	2–1	19.12.2010	Stadio Luigi Ferraris	0–1
2012–13	Serie A	14.04.2013	Stadio Luigi Ferraris	1–1	18.11.2012	Stadio Luigi Ferraris	3–1
2013–14	Serie A	03.02.2014	Stadio Luigi Ferraris	0–1	15.09.2013	Stadio Luigi Ferraris	0–3
2014–15	Serie A	28.09.2014	Stadio Luigi Ferraris	0–1	24.02.2015	Stadio Luigi Ferraris	1–1
2015–16	Serie A	05.01.2016	Stadio Luigi Ferraris	2–3	08.05.2016	Stadio Luigi Ferraris	0–3
2016–17	Serie A	11.03.2017	Stadio Luigi Ferraris	0–1	22.10.2016	Stadio Luigi Ferraris	2–1
2017–18	Serie A	04.11.2017	Stadio Luigi Ferraris	0–2	07.04.2018	Stadio Luigi Ferraris	0–0
2018–19	Serie A	25.11.2018	Stadio Luigi Ferraris	1–1	14.04.2019	Stadio Luigi Ferraris	2–0
2019–20	Serie A	14.12.2019	Stadio Luigi Ferraris	0–1	22.07.2020	Stadio Luigi Ferraris	1–2
2020–21	Serie A	03.03.2021	Stadio Luigi Ferraris	1–1	01.11.2020	Stadio Luigi Ferraris	1–1
2021–22	Serie A	10.12.2021	Stadio Luigi Ferraris	1–3	30.04.2022	Stadio Luigi Ferraris	1–0

=== Cup matches ===
Season	Competition	Round	Date	Stadium	Home team	Result	Away team
1957–58	Coppa Italia	Group stage	22.06.1958	Stadio Luigi Ferraris	Genoa	1–3	Sampdoria
1957–58	Coppa Italia	Group stage	19.07.1958	Stadio Luigi Ferraris	Genoa	2–0	Sampdoria
1966–67	Coppa Italia	Group stage	30.09.1966	Stadio Luigi Ferraris	Sampdoria	1–0	Genoa
1968–69	Coppa Italia	Group stage	08.09.1968	Stadio Luigi Ferraris	Sampdoria	2–1	Genoa
1969–70	Coppa Italia	Group stage	31.08.1972	Stadio Luigi Ferraris	Genoa	1–1	Sampdoria
1971–72	Coppa Italia	Group stage	19.09.1971	Stadio Luigi Ferraris	Sampdoria	1–1	Genoa
1972–73	Coppa Italia	Group stage	30.09.1972	Stadio Luigi Ferraris	Genoa	1–1	Sampdoria
1978–79	Coppa Italia	Group stage	30.08.1978	Stadio Luigi Ferraris	Genoa	0–1	Sampdoria
1989–90	Coppa Italia	Second Round	30.08.1989	Stadio Luigi Ferraris	Genoa	0–1	Sampdoria
1996–97	Coppa Italia	Round of 32	28.08.1996	Stadio Luigi Ferraris	Genoa	2–2	Sampdoria
1996–97	Coppa Italia	Round of 32	02.10.1996	Stadio Luigi Ferraris	Sampdoria	0–2	Genoa
2002–03	Coppa Italia	Group stage	03.09.2002	Stadio Luigi Ferraris	Genoa	1–2	Sampdoria
2020–21	Coppa Italia	Fourth round	26.11.2020	Stadio Luigi Ferraris	Sampdoria	1–3	Genoa
2024–25	Coppa Italia	Second round	25.09.2024	Stadio Luigi Ferraris	Genoa	1–1 (5–6 p)	Sampdoria

== Head-to-head ranking in Serie A (1930–2025) ==
P.	30	31	32	33	34	35	36	37	38	39	40	41	42	43	46	47	48	49	50	51	52	53	54	55	56	57	58	59	60	61	62	63	64	65	66	67	68	69	70	71	72	73	74	75	76	77	78	79	80	81	82	83	84	85	86	87	88	89	90	91	92	93	94	95	96	97	98	99	00	01	02	03	04	05	06	07	08	09	10	11	12	13	14	15	16	17	18	19	20	21	22	23	24	25
1																																																												1																																		
2	2																																																																																													
3									3																																																						3																															
4		4								4			4																	4																								4			4			4																			4															
5										5	5			5				5								5		5																														5	5															5				5																
6								6																	6																															6					6					6											6							6										
7																		7			7																															7	7									7																						7										
8				8			8																8						8				8																															8	8								8																					
9																								9	9																9																										9									9			9									9		9				
10												10										10									10						10																																								10			10						10	10							
11			11						11				11			11			11					11				11				11														11													11				11																						11					11			11	
12							12								12	12	12			12			12				12											12		12		12			12							12			12																				12								12				12							
13						13													13								13												13				13	13							13											13																13																13
14								14									14																	14												14	14						14								14																					14	14											
15											15																					15	15										15																					15																					15				15		15			
16														16												16								16	16																																	16																		16								
17					17																																																																												17	17						17	17					
18																													18																																																			18														
19																																																																																											19			
20																				20																																																																								20		

• Total: Genoa with 17 higher finishes, Sampdoria with 30 higher finishes (as of the end of the 2024–25 season).

Notes:

- Genoa finished 12th in their group and did not qualify for the final round of 8 teams in 1946

== Honours ==
Sampdoria	Competition	Genoa
Domestic
1	Italian Football Championship / Serie A	9
4	Coppa Italia	1
1	Supercoppa Italiana	—
2	Serie B	6
8	Total	16
European
1	UEFA Cup Winners' Cup	—
1	Total	0
9	Grand Total	16

=== Chronological order of honours ===
Table correct as of 29 November 2017.

Competition	1898	1899	1900	1902	1903	1904	1915	1923	1924	1937	1985	1988	1989	1990	1991	1994	Total
Serie A	Genoa	Genoa	Genoa	Genoa	Genoa	Genoa	Genoa	Genoa	Genoa						Sampdoria		10
Coppa Italia										Genoa	Sampdoria	Sampdoria	Sampdoria			Sampdoria	5
Supercoppa Italiana															Sampdoria		1
UEFA Cup Winners' Cup														Sampdoria			1

== See also ==
History of UC Sampdoria and History of Genoa CFC
