= Bruno Gramaglia =

Italian footballer (1919–2005)

Personal information
- Date of birth: 23 April 1919
- Place of birth: Genoa, Italy
- Date of death: 2 November 2005 (aged 86)
- Place of death: Rapallo, Italy
- Height: 1.78 m (5 ft 10 in)
- Position: Midfielder

Senior career*
Years	Team	Apps	(Gls)
1937–38	Andrea Doria	31	(0)
1938–43	Napoli	89	(1)
1944	Spezia	10	(0)
1945–46	Doria	26	(1)
1946–49	Sampdoria	93	(1)
1949–55	Napoli	184	(4)
- * Club domestic league appearances and goals

Bruno Gramaglia (23 April 1919 – 2 November 2005) was an Italian footballer from Genoa, in Liguria, who played as a midfielder. He played club football for several Italian sides, most notably Napoli and Sampdoria; he is the joint-fourth highest all-time league appearance holder for Napoli, along with Attila Sallustro.

He was part of the Spezia squad, which won the Campionato Alta Italia 1944 during World War II. It was recognised by the FIGC as a legitimate top-level Italian Championship in 2002. Gramaglia died in Rapallo on 2 November 2005.
