= Fulvio Francesconi =

Italian footballer

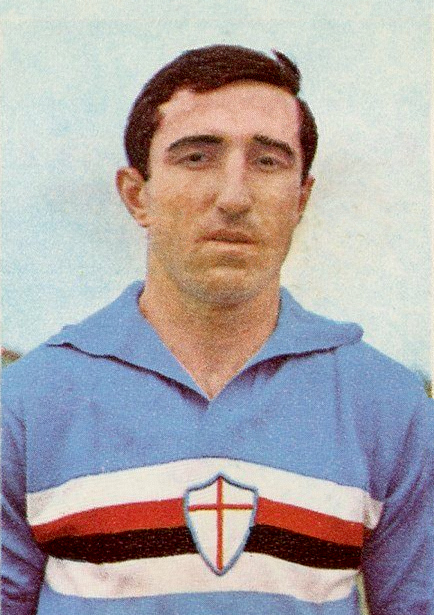
- Francesconi with Sampdoria, c. 1967

Personal information
- Date of birth: 19 November 1944 (age 81)
- Place of birth: Russi, Italy
- Height: 1.70 m (5 ft 7 in)
- Position: Midfielder

Senior career*
Years	Team	Apps	(Gls)
1962–1963	Como	8	(1)
1963–1966	Roma	61	(10)
1966–1971	Sampdoria	108	(33)
1971–1973	Catania	66	(20)
1973–1976	Reggiana	96	(14)
- * Club domestic league appearances and goals

Fulvio Francesconi (born 19 November 1944) is a retired Italian professional footballer who played as a midfielder.

== Career ==
Francesconi played for 7 seasons (131 games, 23 goals) in the Serie A for Italian clubs A.S. Roma and U.C. Sampdoria.

== Honours ==
=== Club ===
Roma

- Coppa Italia winner: 1963–64.

=== Individual ===
- Serie B top scorer: 1966–67 (20 goals).
