= Giuseppe Baldini =

Italian footballer and manager

Personal information
- Date of birth: 11 March 1922
- Place of birth: Russi, Italy
- Date of death: 26 November 2009 (aged 87)
- Place of death: Genova, Italy
- Position: Forward

Youth career
- 1937–1939: Pontedera

Senior career*
Years	Team	Apps	(Gls)
1939–1942	Fiorentina	51	(8)
1942–1943	Inter Milan	25	(6)
1945–1946	Andrea Doria	23	(13)
1946–1950	Sampdoria	129	(53)
1950–1951	Genoa	31	(6)
1951–1953	Como	54	(19)
1953–1955	Sampdoria	56	(18)
1955–1960	Como	111	(38)
Total		480	(161)

International career
1949	Italy	1	(0)

Managerial career
- 1960–1962: Como
- 1965–1966: Sampdoria
- 1967–1968: Savona
- 1969–1970: Virtus Entella
- 1972–1973: Virtus Entella
- 1976–1977: Avellino
- * Club domestic league appearances and goals

Giuseppe Baldini (Italian pronunciation: [dʒuˈzɛppe balˈdiːni]; 11 March 1922 – 26 November 2009) was an Italian football player and manager. During his playing career, Baldini played at both professional and international levels as a forward, before becoming a football manager.

== Career ==
Born in Russi, Baldini began his career as a youth player with Pontedera, before turning professional with Fiorentina in 1939. Baldini later played club football for Inter Milan, Andrea Doria, Sampdoria, Genoa and Como, as well as making one appearance for the Italy national side in 1949.

After retiring from the game, he became a football manager, and managed Como, Sampdoria, Savona, Virtus Entella and Avellino.
