= 1978 Torneo di Viareggio =

1978 Torneo Mondiale di Calcio Coppa Carnevale
30° Torneo di Viareggio

Tournament details
- Host country: Italy
- City: Viareggio
- Teams: 16

Final positions
- Champions: (Italy) Fiorentina
- Runners-up: (Italy) Roma
- Third place: (Italy) Inter Milan
- Fourth place: (Socialist Federal Republic of Yugoslavia) OFK Beograd

Tournament statistics
- Matches played: 30
- Goals scored: 71 (2.37 per match)

The 1978 winners of the Torneo di Viareggio (in English, the Viareggio Tournament, officially the Viareggio Cup World Football Tournament Coppa Carnevale), the annual youth football tournament held in Viareggio, Tuscany, are listed below.

== Format ==
The 16 teams are seeded in 4 groups. Each team from a group meets the others in a single tie. The winner of each group progress to the final knockout stage.

== Participating teams ==
Italian teams

- (Italy) Fiorentina
- (Italy) Inter Milan
- (Italy) Juventus
- (Italy) Milan
- (Italy) Napoli
- (Italy) Perugia
- (Italy) Roma
- (Italy) Sampdoria

European teams

- (Socialist Federal Republic of Yugoslavia) OFK Beograd
- (Czechoslovakia) Dukla Praha
- (Bulgaria) Levski-Spartak
- (France) Bastia
- (Greece) Olympiacos
- (Portugal) Benfica
- (Spain) Real Murcia

Asian teams

- (China) Beijing Youth

== Group stage ==
=== Group A ===
Team	Pts	Pld	W	D	L	GF	GA	GD
(Italy) Fiorentina	5	3	2	1	0	7	1	+6
(Socialist Federal Republic of Yugoslavia) OFK Beograd	4	3	1	2	0	4	3	+1
(Italy) Sampdoria	2	3	0	2	1	0	3	-3
(China) Beijing Youth	1	3	0	1	2	2	6	-4

=== Group B ===
Team	Pts	Pld	W	D	L	GF	GA	GD
(Bulgaria) Levski-Spartak	6	3	3	0	0	9	2	+7
(Czechoslovakia) Dukla Praha	4	3	2	0	1	5	3	+2
(Italy) Milan	2	3	1	0	2	2	5	-3
(Italy) Napoli	0	3	0	0	3	1	7	-6

=== Group C ===
Team	Pts	Pld	W	D	L	GF	GA	GD
(Italy) Inter Milan	5	3	2	1	0	7	1	+6
(Portugal) Benfica	4	3	1	2	0	3	2	+1
(Italy) Perugia	3	3	1	1	1	3	2	+1
(Greece) Olympiacos	0	3	0	0	3	2	10	-8

=== Group D ===
Team	Pts	Pld	W	D	L	GF	GA	GD
(Italy) Roma	5	3	2	1	0	4	1	+3
(Spain) Real Murcia	4	3	1	2	0	5	2	+3
(Italy) Juventus	3	3	1	1	1	3	3	0
(France) Bastia	0	3	0	0	3	0	6	-6

== Knockout stage ==
Quarter-finals
(Portugal) Benfica	0
(Italy) Roma	1
(Italy) Inter Milan(pen)	0
(Spain) Real Murcia	0
(Socialist Federal Republic of Yugoslavia) OFK Beograd	2
(Bulgaria) Levski-Spartak	0
(Czechoslovakia) Dukla Praha	0
(Italy) Fiorentina	2

Semi-finals
(Italy) Roma	1
(Italy) Inter Milan	0
(Socialist Federal Republic of Yugoslavia) OFK Beograd	0
(Italy) Fiorentina(pen)	0

Final
(Italy) Roma	0
(Italy) Fiorentina	4
Third place
(Italy) Inter Milan	3
(Socialist Federal Republic of Yugoslavia) OFK Beograd	1

== Champions ==
Torneo di Viareggio 1978 Champions

Fiorentina
4th time
