= 1976 Torneo di Viareggio =

1976 Torneo Mondiale di Calcio Coppa Carnevale
28° Torneo di Viareggio

Tournament details
- Host country: Italy
- City: Viareggio
- Teams: 16

Final positions
- Champions: (Czechoslovakia) Dukla Prague
- Runners-up: (Italy) Milan
- Third place: (Italy) Torino
- Fourth place: (Italy) Inter Milan

Tournament statistics
- Matches played: 30
- Goals scored: 95 (3.17 per match)

The 1976 winners of the Torneo di Viareggio (in English, the Viareggio Tournament, officially the Viareggio Cup World Football Tournament Coppa Carnevale), the annual youth football tournament held in Viareggio, Tuscany, are listed below.

== Format ==
The 16 teams are seeded in 4 groups. Each team from a group meets the others in a single tie. The winner of each group progress to the final knockout stage.

== Participating teams ==
Italian teams

- (Italy) Como
- (Italy) Inter Milan
- (Italy) Lazio
- (Italy) Milan
- (Italy) Napoli
- (Italy) Roma
- (Italy) Sampdoria
- (Italy) Torino

European teams

- (Czechoslovakia) Dukla Praha
- (Bulgaria) CSKA Sofia
- (Spain) Barcelona
- (Socialist Federal Republic of Yugoslavia) Partizan Beograd
- (Netherlands) Heemskerk
- (West Germany) Offenbach
- (Scotland) Rangers
- (Poland) Wisła Kraków

== Group stage ==
=== Group A ===
Team	Pts	Pld	W	D	L	GF	GA	GD
(Italy) Torino	6	3	3	0	0	12	4	+8
(Italy) Napoli	4	3	2	0	1	4	3	+1
(Bulgaria) CSKA Sofia	1	3	0	1	2	2	5	-3
(Spain) Barcelona	1	3	0	1	2	0	6	-6

=== Group B ===
Team	Pts	Pld	W	D	L	GF	GA	GD
(Italy) Milan	5	3	2	1	0	9	1	+8
(Italy) Roma	5	3	2	1	0	7	4	+3
(Socialist Federal Republic of Yugoslavia) Partizan Beograd	2	3	1	0	2	5	8	-3
(Netherlands) Heemskerk	0	3	0	0	3	2	10	-8

=== Group C ===
Team	Pts	Pld	W	D	L	GF	GA	GD
(Czechoslovakia) Dukla Praha	6	3	3	0	0	6	1	+5
(Scotland) Rangers	4	3	2	0	1	5	6	-1
(Italy) Lazio	2	3	1	0	2	1	2	-1
(Italy) Como	0	3	0	0	3	4	7	-3

=== Group D ===
Team	Pts	Pld	W	D	L	GF	GA	GD
(Italy) Inter	6	3	3	0	0	3	0	+3
(Italy) Sampdoria	4	3	2	0	1	8	4	+4
(West Germany) Offenbach	2	3	1	0	2	3	5	-2
(Poland) Wisła Kraków	0	3	0	0	3	2	5	-5

== Knockout stage ==
Quarter-finals
(Italy) Milan	1
(Italy) Napoli	0
(Italy) Roma	1 [?]
(Italy) Torino(pen)	1 [?]
(Czechoslovakia) Dukla Praha(pen)	2 [?]
(Italy) Sampdoria	2 [?]
(Scotland) Rangers	1
(Italy) Inter	2

Semi-finals
(Italy) Milan	4
(Italy) Torino	3
(Czechoslovakia) Dukla Praha	1
(Italy) Inter	0

Final
(Italy) Milan	0
(Czechoslovakia) Dukla Praha	1
Third place
(Italy) Torino	3
(Italy) Inter	0

== Champions ==
Torneo di Viareggio 1976 Champions

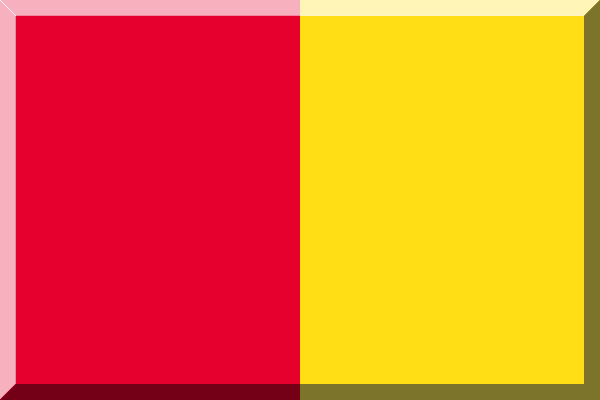

Dukla Praha
5th time
