= 1987 Torneo di Viareggio =

1987 Torneo Mondiale di Calcio Coppa Carnevale
39° Torneo di Viareggio

Tournament details
- Host country: Italy
- City: Viareggio
- Teams: 16

Final positions
- Champions: (Italy) Torino
- Runners-up: (Italy) Fiorentina
- Third place: (Italy) Lanerossi Vicenza
- Fourth place: (Italy) Genoa

Tournament statistics
- Matches played: 30
- Goals scored: 55 (1.83 per match)

The 1987 winners of the Torneo di Viareggio (in English, the Viareggio Tournament, officially the Viareggio Cup World Football Tournament Coppa Carnevale), the annual youth football tournament held in Viareggio, Tuscany, are listed below.

== Format ==
The 16 teams are seeded in 4 groups. Each team from a group meets the others in a single tie. The winner of each group progress to the final knockout stage.

== Participating teams ==
Italian teams

- (Italy) Atalanta
- (Italy) Avellino
- (Italy) Bologna
- (Italy) Fiorentina
- (Italy) Genoa
- (Italy) Inter Milan
- (Italy) Lanerossi Vicenza
- (Italy) Milan
- (Italy) Napoli
- (Italy) Roma
- (Italy) Sampdoria
- (Italy) Torino

European teams

- (Czechoslovakia) Dukla Prague
- (West Germany) Bayern Munich
- (Socialist Federal Republic of Yugoslavia) Dinamo Zagreb

American teams

- (Argentina) Platense

== Group stage ==
=== Group A ===
Team	Pts	Pld	W	D	L	GF	GA	GD
(Italy) Bologna	4	3	1	2	0	3	1	+2
(Italy) Torino	4	3	1	2	0	3	1	+2
(Italy) Inter Milan	4	3	1	2	0	4	3	+1
(Socialist Federal Republic of Yugoslavia) Dinamo Zagreb	0	3	0	0	3	1	6	}

=== Group B ===
Team	Pts	Pld	W	D	L	GF	GA	GD
(Czechoslovakia) Dukla Prague	4	3	1	2	0	4	2	+2
(Italy) Lanerossi Vicenza	3	3	0	3	0	1	1	0
(Italy) Roma	3	3	0	3	0	0	0	0
(Italy) Napoli	2	3	0	2	1	1	3	-2

=== Group C ===
Team	Pts	Pld	W	D	L	GF	GA	GD
(Italy) Milan	5	3	2	1	0	6	3	+3
(Italy) Sampdoria	4	3	1	2	0	3	2	+1
(Italy) Atalanta	2	3	1	0	2	3	4	-1
(West Germany) Bayern Munich	1	3	0	1	2	0	3	-3

=== Group D ===
Team	Pts	Pld	W	D	L	GF	GA	GD
(Italy) Genoa	5	3	2	1	0	2	0	+2
(Italy) Fiorentina	4	3	1	2	0	1	0	+1
(Argentina) Platense	3	3	1	1	1	2	2	0
(Italy) Avellino	0	3	0	0	3	1	4	-3

== Knockout stage ==
Quarter-finals
(Italy) Torino	2
(Czechoslovakia) Dukla Prague	0
(Italy) Bologna	2
(Italy) Lanerossi Vicenza (pen)	2
(Italy) Fiorentina	1
(Italy) Milan	0
(Italy) Genoa (pen)	1
(Italy) Sampdoria	1

Semi-finals
(Italy) Torino	2
(Italy) Lanerossi Vicenza	0
(Italy) Fiorentina	3
(Italy) Genoa	0

Final
(Italy) Torino	4
(Italy) Fiorentina	1
Third place
(Italy) Genoa	1
(Italy) Lanerossi Vicenza (pen)	1

== Champions ==
Torneo di Viareggio 1987 Champions

Torino
3rd time
