= 1983 Torneo di Viareggio =

1983 Torneo Mondiale di Calcio Coppa Carnevale
35° Torneo di Viareggio

Tournament details
- Host country: Italy
- City: Viareggio
- Teams: 16

Final positions
- Champions: (Italy) Roma
- Runners-up: (Italy) Inter Milan
- Third place: (Italy) Fiorentina
- Fourth place: (Czechoslovakia) Dukla Praha

Tournament statistics
- Matches played: 30
- Goals scored: 61 (2.03 per match)

The 1983 winners of the Torneo di Viareggio (in English, the Viareggio Tournament, officially the Viareggio Cup World Football Tournament Coppa Carnevale), the annual youth football tournament held in Viareggio, Tuscany, are listed below.

== Format ==
The 16 teams are seeded in 4 groups. Each team from a group meets the others in a single tie. The winner of each group progress to the final knockout stage.

== Participating teams ==
Italian teams

- (Italy) Catanzaro
- (Italy) Cesena
- (Italy) Fiorentina
- (Italy) Inter Milan
- (Italy) Juventus
- (Italy) Lazio
- (Italy) Milan
- (Italy) Pisa
- (Italy) Roma

European teams

- (England) Ipswich Town
- (Czechoslovakia) Dukla Praha
- (Poland) Warszawa
- (Socialist Federal Republic of Yugoslavia) Partizan Beograd

American teams

- (Chile) CD Universidad Católica
- (Brazil) Palmeiras

African teams

- Algeria

== Group stage ==
=== Group A ===
Team	Pts	Pld	W	D	L	GF	GA	GD
(Italy) Fiorentina	5	3	2	1	0	5	0	+5
(Italy) Catanzaro	5	3	2	1	0	2	0	+2
(Brazil) Palmeiras	2	3	1	0	2	2	3	-1
(Poland) Warszawa	0	3	0	0	3	0	6	-6

=== Group B ===
Team	Pts	Pld	W	D	L	GF	GA	GD
(Italy) Roma	5	3	2	1	0	4	2	+2
(Italy) Milan	4	3	1	1	1	3	2	+1
(Italy) Cesena	2	3	1	0	2	1	2	-1
(England) Ipswich Town	1	3	0	1	2	1	3	-2

=== Group C ===
Team	Pts	Pld	W	D	L	GF	GA	GD
(Czechoslovakia) Dukla Praha	4	3	2	0	1	5	3	+2
(Italy) Lazio	3	3	1	1	1	3	0	+3
(Italy) Juventus	3	3	1	1	1	3	5	-2
(Chile) CD Universidad Católica	2	3	0	2	1	0	1	-1

=== Group D ===
Team	Pts	Pld	W	D	L	GF	GA	GD
(Italy) Inter	6	3	3	0	0	5	0	+5
(Socialist Federal Republic of Yugoslavia) Partizan Beograd	4	3	2	0	1	3	1	+2
(Italy) Pisa	2	3	1	0	2	5	3	+2
Algeria	0	3	0	0	3	0	9	-9

== Knockout stage ==
Quarter-finals
(Italy) Fiorentina	1
(Italy) Milan	0
(Italy) Catanzaro	1
(Italy) Roma(pen)	1
(Italy) Inter	1
(Italy) Lazio	0
(Czechoslovakia) Dukla Praha	2
(Socialist Federal Republic of Yugoslavia) Partizan Beograd	1

Semi-finals
(Italy) Fiorentina	2
(Italy) Roma	4
(Italy) Inter(pen)	0
(Czechoslovakia) Dukla Praha	0

Final
(Italy) Roma	2
(Italy) Inter	0
Third place
(Italy) Fiorentina	2
(Czechoslovakia) Dukla Praha	1

== Champions ==
Torneo di Viareggio 1983 Champions

Roma
2nd time
