= 1963 Torneo di Viareggio =

Youth football tournament

1963 Torneo Mondiale di Calcio Coppa Carnevale
15° Torneo di Viareggio

Tournament details
- Host country: Italy
- City: Viareggio
- Teams: 16

Final positions
- Champions: (Italy) Sampdoria
- Runners-up: (Italy) Bologna
- Third place: (Czechoslovakia) Dukla Praha
- Fourth place: (Italy) Inter Milan

Tournament statistics
- Matches played: 24
- Goals scored: 69 (2.88 per match)

The 1963 winners of the Torneo di Viareggio (in English, the Viareggio Tournament, officially the Viareggio Cup World Football Tournament Coppa Carnevale), the annual youth football tournament held in Viareggio, Tuscany, are listed below.

== Format ==
The 16 teams are organized in knockout rounds. The round of 16 are played in two-legs, while the rest of the rounds are single tie.

== Participating teams ==
Italian teams

- (Italy) Bologna
- (Italy) Fiorentina
- (Italy) Inter Milan
- (Italy) Juventus
- (Italy) Milan
- (Italy) Modena
- (Italy) Napoli
- (Italy) Sampdoria

European teams

- (Socialist Federal Republic of Yugoslavia) Partizan Beograd
- (Socialist Federal Republic of Yugoslavia) Rijeka
- (Belgium) Daring
- (Czechoslovakia) Dukla Praha
- (Austria) Grazer AK
- (West Germany) Bayern München
- (Romania) Progresul București
- (Bulgaria) CSKA Sofia

== Tournament fixtures ==
First round
(Austria) Graz	0	0	0
(Italy) Inter	1	2	3
(Italy) Napoli	0	0	0
(Socialist Federal Republic of Yugoslavia) Partizan Beograd	3	1	4
(West Germany) Bayern München	0	0	0
(Italy) Fiorentina	3	1	4
(Romania) Progresul București	2	2	4
(Italy) Sampdoria	3	2	5
(Czechoslovakia) Dukla Praha	1	3	4
(Italy) Modena	1	0	1
(Italy) Juventus	2	2	4
(Socialist Federal Republic of Yugoslavia) Rijeka	0	1	1
(Italy) Bologna	4	2	6
(Bulgaria) CSKA Sofia	2	3	5
(Belgium) Daring	0	3	3
(Italy) Milan	2	1	3

Quarter-finals
(Italy) Inter	3
(Socialist Federal Republic of Yugoslavia) Partizan Beograd	0
(Italy) Fiorentina	0
(Italy) Sampdoria	1
(Czechoslovakia) Dukla Praha(pen)	1 [6]
(Italy) Juventus	1 [4]
(Italy) Bologna	4
(Belgium) Daring	0

Semi-finals
(Italy) Inter	2
(Italy) Sampdoria(aet)	4
(Italy) Bologna	1
(Italy) Dukla Praha	0

Final
(Italy) Sampdoria	2
(Italy) Bologna	1
Third place
(Italy) Inter	1
(Czechoslovakia) Dukla Praha	1

== Champions ==
Torneo di Viareggio 1963 champions
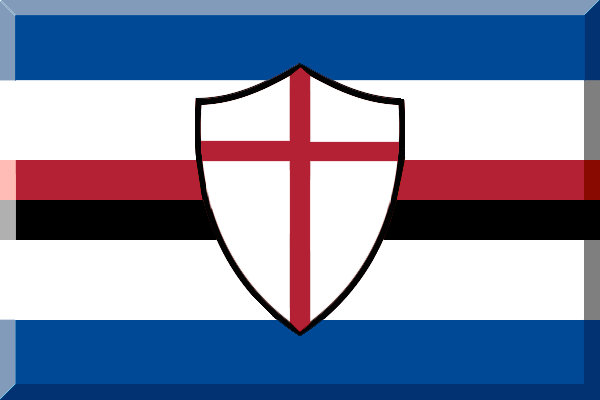
Sampdoria
3rd title
