= 1972 Torneo di Viareggio =

1972 Torneo Mondiale di Calcio Coppa Carnevale
24° Torneo di Viareggio

Tournament details
- Host country: Italy
- City: Viareggio
- Teams: 16

Final positions
- Champions: (Czechoslovakia) Dukla Praha
- Runners-up: (Italy) Inter Milan
- Third place: (Argentina) Boca Juniors
- Fourth place: (Italy) Fiorentina

Tournament statistics
- Matches played: 24
- Goals scored: 56 (2.33 per match)

The 1972 winners of the Torneo di Viareggio (in English, the Viareggio Tournament, officially the Viareggio Cup World Football Tournament Coppa Carnevale), the annual youth football tournament held in Viareggio, Tuscany, are listed below.

== Format ==
The 16 teams are organized in knockout rounds. The round of 16 are played in two-legs, while the rest of the rounds are single tie.

== Participating teams ==
Italian teams

- (Italy) Atalanta
- (Italy) Fiorentina
- (Italy) Inter Milan
- (Italy) Lazio
- (Italy) Milan
- (Italy) Napoli
- (Italy) Roma
- (Italy) Torino

European teams

- (Hungary) Újpest Dózsa
- (Czechoslovakia) Dukla Praha
- (Socialist Federal Republic of Yugoslavia) Partizan Beograd
- (Switzerland) Lausanne
- (Belgium) Standard Liège
- (Portugal) Benfica
- (England) Crystal Palace

American teams

- (Argentina) Boca Juniors

== Tournament fixtures ==
First round
(Italy) Inter | 0 | 1 | 1
(Hungary) Újpesti Dózsa | 0 | 0 | 0
(England) Crystal Palace | 2 | 1 | 3
(Italy) Lazio | 1 | 0 | 1
(Italy) Atalanta | 1 | 1 | 2 [3]
(Argentina) Boca Juniors(pen) | 0 | 2 | 2 [4]
(Socialist Federal Republic of Yugoslavia) Partizan Beograd | 0 | 1 | 1
(Italy) Torino | 0 | 3 | 3
(Czechoslovakia) Dukla Praha | 4 | 0 | 4
(Italy) Roma | 0 | 2 | 2
(Switzerland) Lausanne | 1 | 0 | 1
(Italy) Milan | 7 | 2 | 9
(Italy) Fiorentina | 1 | 4 | 5
(Belgium) Standard Liège | 0 | 0 | 0
(Portugal) Benfica | 0 | 1 | 1
(Italy) Napoli | 2 | 1 | 3

Quarter-finals
(Italy) Inter | 1
(England) Crystal Palace | 0
(Argentina) Boca Juniors(pen) | 1 [4]
(Italy) Torino | 1 [3]
(Czechoslovakia) Dukla Praha(pen) | 2 [7]
(Italy) Milan | 2 [6]
(Italy) Fiorentina | 1
(Italy) Napoli | 0

Semi-finals
(Italy) Inter(pen) | 1 [10]
(Argentina) Boca Juniors | 1 [9]
(Czechoslovakia) Dukla Praha | 3
(Italy) Fiorentina | 0

Final
(Italy) Inter | 0
(Czechoslovakia) Dukla Praha | 2
Third place
(Argentina) Boca Juniors | 2
(Italy) Fiorentina | 1

== Champions ==
Torneo di Viareggio 1972 champions
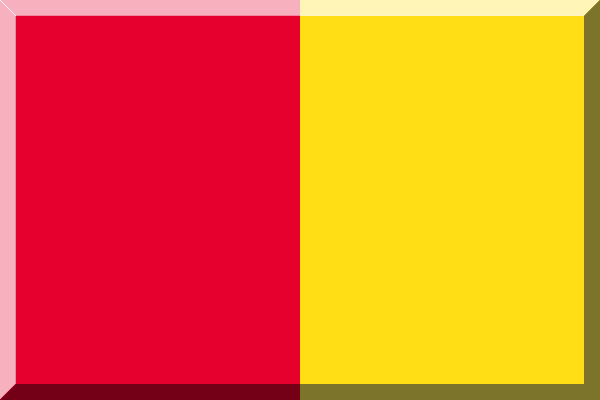
Dukla Praha
4th title
