= 1969 Torneo di Viareggio =

1969 Torneo Mondiale di Calcio Coppa Carnevale
21° Torneo di Viareggio

Tournament details
- Host country: Italy
- City: Viareggio
- Teams: 16

Final positions
- Champions: (Italy) Atalanta
- Runners-up: (Italy) Napoli
- Third place: (Czechoslovakia) Dukla Praha
- Fourth place: (Italy) Fiorentina

Tournament statistics
- Matches played: 24
- Goals scored: 45 (1.88 per match)

The 1969 winners of the Torneo di Viareggio (in English, the Viareggio Tournament, officially the Viareggio Cup World Football Tournament Coppa Carnevale), the annual youth football tournament held in Viareggio, Tuscany, are listed below.

== Format ==
The 16 teams are organized in knockout rounds. The round of 16 are played in two-legs, while the rest of the rounds are single tie.

== Participating teams ==
Italian teams

- (Italy) Atalanta
- (Italy) Bologna
- (Italy) Fiorentina
- (Italy) Inter Milan
- (Italy) Juventus
- (Italy) Milan
- (Italy) Napoli
- (Italy) Pisa

European teams

- (West Germany) Eintracht Frankfurt
- (Czechoslovakia) Dukla Praha
- (Socialist Federal Republic of Yugoslavia) Vojvodina
- (Poland) Motor Lublin
- (Bulgaria) CSKA Sofia
- (Portugal) Benfica
- (Hungary) Vasas Budapest
- (Spain) Espanyol

== Tournament fixtures ==
First round
(Italy) Atalanta	2	2	4
(West Germany) Eintracht Frankfurt	0	1	1
(Italy) Milan	1	1	2
(Hungary) Vasas Budapest	0	1	1
(Italy) Bologna	1	1	2
(Czechoslovakia) Dukla Praha	2	1	3
(Italy) Juventus	2	2	4
(Poland) Motor Lublin	0	0	0
(Italy) Napoli	3	0	3
(Socialist Federal Republic of Yugoslavia) Vojvodina	1	1	2
(Bulgaria) CSKA Sofia	2	1	3
(Italy) Inter	0	1	1
(Spain) Espanyol	0	0	0
(Italy) Fiorentina	2	1	3
(Portugal) Benfica(pen)	2	0	2
(Italy) Pisa	1	1	2

Quarter-finals
(Italy) Atalanta(pen)	1 [8]
(Italy) Milan	1 [7]
(Czechoslovakia) Dukla Praha(pen)	1 [6]
(Italy) Juventus	1 [5]
(Italy) Napoli(pen)	0 [6]
(Bulgaria) CSKA Sofia	0 [3]
(Italy) Fiorentina	1
(Portugal) Benfica	0

Semi-finals
(Italy) Atalanta(pen)	0 [9]
(Czechoslovakia) Dukla Praha	0 [8]
(Italy) Napoli	1
(Italy) Fiorentina	0

Final
(Italy) Atalanta	2
(Italy) Napoli	0
Third place
(Czechoslovakia) Dukla Praha	3
(Italy) Fiorentina	1

== Champions ==
Torneo di Viareggio 1969 champions
Atalanta
1st title
