= 1974 Torneo di Viareggio =

1974 Torneo Mondiale di Calcio Coppa Carnevale
26° Torneo di Viareggio

Tournament details
- Host country: Italy
- City: Viareggio
- Teams: 16

Final positions
- Champions: (Italy) Fiorentina
- Runners-up: (Italy) Lazio
- Third place: (Italy) Sampdoria
- Fourth place: (Netherlands) Amsterdam

Tournament statistics
- Matches played: 28
- Goals scored: 52 (1.86 per match)

The 1974 winners of the Torneo di Viareggio (in English, the Viareggio Tournament, officially the Viareggio Cup World Football Tournament Coppa Carnevale), the annual youth football tournament held in Viareggio, Tuscany, are listed below.

== Format ==
The 16 teams are organized in knockout rounds. The round of 16 and the round of 8 are played in two-legs, while semifinals and finals are single tie.

== Participating teams ==
Italian teams

- (Italy) Bologna
- (Italy) Fiorentina
- (Italy) Genoa
- (Italy) Inter Milan
- (Italy) Lazio
- (Italy) Napoli
- (Italy) Roma
- (Italy) Sampdoria

European teams

- (Romania) Rapid București
- (England) Everton
- (Hungary) Ferencváros
- (Socialist Federal Republic of Yugoslavia) Dinamo Zagreb
- (Socialist Federal Republic of Yugoslavia) Vojvodina
- (Netherlands) Amsterdam
- (West Germany) Eintracht Frankfurt
- (Scotland) Rangers

== Tournament fixtures ==
First round
1	(Netherlands) Amsterdam(pen)	1	0	1 [?]
16	(Italy) Inter Milan	1	0	1 [?]
8	(Italy) Napoli	0	2	2
9	(Romania) Rapid București	0	0	0
5	(England) Everton	2	0	2 [?]
12	(Italy) Roma(pen)	2	0	2 [?]
4	(Hungary) Ferencváros	1	0	1
13	(Italy) Fiorentina	3	2	5
6	(Socialist Federal Republic of Yugoslavia) Dinamo Zagreb	0	1	1
11	(Italy) Sampdoria	2	1	3
3	(Italy) Bologna	2	0	2
14	(Scotland) Rangers	3	1	4
7	(Italy) Genoa	2	0	2
10	(Socialist Federal Republic of Yugoslavia) Vojvodina	2	2	4
2	(West Germany) Eintracht Frankfurt	0	1	1
15	(Italy) Lazio	1	3	4

Quarter-finals
(Netherlands) Amsterdam(pen)	1	0	1 [?]
(Italy) Napoli	0	1	1 [?]
(Italy) Roma	1	1	2
(Italy) Fiorentina	1	2	3
(Italy) Sampdoria	1	1	2
(Scotland) Rangers	1	0	1
(Socialist Federal Republic of Yugoslavia) Vojvodina	0	0	0 [?]
(Italy) Lazio(pen)	0	0	0 [?]

Semi-finals
(Netherlands) Amsterdam	0 [?]
(Italy) Fiorentina(pen)	0 [?]
(Italy) Sampdoria	0 [?]
(Italy) Lazio(pen)	0 [?]

Final
(Italy) Fiorentina	2
(Italy) Lazio	1
Third place
(Netherlands) Amsterdam	0
(Italy) Sampdoria	4

== Champions ==
Torneo di Viareggio 1974 champions
Fiorentina
3rd title
