= 1988 Torneo di Viareggio =

1988 Torneo Mondiale di Calcio Coppa Carnevale
40° Torneo di Viareggio

Tournament details
- Host country: Italy
- City: Viareggio
- Teams: 16

Final positions
- Champions: (Italy) Fiorentina
- Runners-up: (Italy) Torino
- Third place: (Italy) Parma
- Fourth place: (Italy) Milan

Tournament statistics
- Matches played: 30
- Goals scored: 68 (2.27 per match)

The 1988 winners of the Torneo di Viareggio (in English, the Viareggio Tournament, officially the Viareggio Cup World Football Tournament Coppa Carnevale), the annual youth football tournament held in Viareggio, Tuscany, are listed below.

== Format ==
The 16 teams are seeded in 4 groups. Each team from a group meets the others in a single tie. The winner of each group progress to the final knockout stage.

== Participating teams ==
Italian teams

- (Italy) Fiorentina
- (Italy) Genoa
- (Italy) Inter Milan
- (Italy) Milan
- (Italy) Napoli
- (Italy) Parma
- (Italy) Roma
- (Italy) Torino

European teams

- (Scotland) Rangers
- (Czechoslovakia) Dukla Prague
- (Portugal) Porto
- (West Germany) VfB Stuttgart
- (Socialist Federal Republic of Yugoslavia) Partizan
- (Romania) Steaua București
- (Spain) Espanyol

American teams

- Mexico City

== Group stage ==
=== Group A ===
| Team | Pts | Pld | W | D | L | GF | GA | GD |
|---|---|---|---|---|---|---|---|---|
| (Italy) Genoa | 4 | 3 | 2 | 0 | 1 | 8 | 3 | +5 |
| (Italy) Fiorentina | 4 | 3 | 2 | 0 | 1 | 6 | 5 | +1 |
| (Scotland) Rangers | 4 | 3 | 2 | 0 | 1 | 5 | 4 | +1 |
| (Spain) Espanyol | 0 | 3 | 0 | 0 | 3 | 3 | 10 | -7 |

=== Group B ===
| Team | Pts | Pld | W | D | L | GF | GA | GD |
|---|---|---|---|---|---|---|---|---|
| (Italy) Roma | 5 | 3 | 2 | 1 | 0 | 7 | 0 | +7 |
| (Italy) Milan | 5 | 3 | 2 | 1 | 0 | 3 | 1 | +2 |
| (West Germany) VfB Stuttgart | 2 | 3 | 1 | 0 | 2 | 3 | 6 | -3 |
| (Portugal) Porto | 0 | 3 | 0 | 0 | 3 | 1 | 7 | -6 |

=== Group C ===
| Team | Pts | Pld | W | D | L | GF | GA | GD |
|---|---|---|---|---|---|---|---|---|
| (Italy) Parma | 5 | 3 | 2 | 1 | 0 | 6 | 0 | +6 |
| Mexico City | 4 | 3 | 1 | 2 | 0 | 2 | 1 | +1 |
| (Socialist Federal Republic of Yugoslavia) Partizan | 2 | 3 | 0 | 2 | 1 | 1 | 2 | -1 |
| (Italy) Inter Milan | 1 | 3 | 0 | 1 | 2 | 2 | 8 | -6 |

=== Group D ===
| Team | Pts | Pld | W | D | L | GF | GA | GD |
|---|---|---|---|---|---|---|---|---|
| (Italy) Torino | 4 | 3 | 1 | 2 | 0 | 2 | 1 | +1 |
| (Czechoslovakia) Dukla Prague | 4 | 3 | 1 | 2 | 0 | 1 | 0 | +1 |
| (Romania) Steaua București | 2 | 3 | 0 | 2 | 1 | 3 | 4 | -1 |
| (Italy) Napoli | 2 | 3 | 0 | 2 | 1 | 2 | 3 | -1 |

== Knockout stage ==
Quarter-finals
(Italy) Genoa | 0
(Italy) Milan | 3
(Italy) Roma | 0
(Italy) Fiorentina | 1
(Italy) Torino (pen) | 1
Mexico City | 1
(Italy) Parma (pen) | 0
(Czechoslovakia) Dukla Prague | 0

Semi-finals
(Italy) Milan | 1
(Italy) Fiorentina | 3
(Italy) Torino | 1
(Italy) Parma | 0

Final
(Italy) Fiorentina | 1
(Italy) Torino | 0
Third place
(Italy) Milan | 1
(Italy) Parma (pen) | 1

== Champions ==
Torneo di Viareggio 1988 Champions

Fiorentina
7th time
