= 1992 Torneo di Viareggio =

1992 Torneo Mondiale di Calcio Coppa Carnevale
44° Torneo di Viareggio

Tournament details
- Host country: Italy
- City: Viareggio
- Teams: 24

Final positions
- Champions: (Italy) Fiorentina
- Runners-up: (Italy) Roma
- Third place: (Italy) Torino
- Fourth place: (Italy) Milan

Tournament statistics
- Matches played: 50
- Goals scored: 121 (2.42 per match)

The 1992 winners of the Torneo di Viareggio (in English, the Viareggio Tournament, officially the Viareggio Cup World Football Tournament Coppa Carnevale), the annual youth football tournament held in Viareggio, Tuscany, are listed below.

== Format ==
The 24 teams are seeded in 6 groups. Each team from a group meets the others in a single tie. The winning club and runners-up from each group progress to the second round. In the second round teams are split up in two groups and meet in a single tie (with penalties after regular time). Winners progress to the final knockout stage, along with the best losing team from each group. The final round matches include 30 minutes extra time and penalties to be played if the draw between teams still holds. The semifinals losing sides play consolation final. The winning teams play the final with extra time and repeat the match if the draw holds.

== Participating teams ==
Italian teams

- (Italy) Atalanta
- (Italy) Avellino
- (Italy) Bari
- (Italy) Bologna
- (Italy) Cesena
- (Italy) Fiorentina
- (Italy) Foggia
- (Italy) Inter Milan
- (Italy) Juventus
- (Italy) Lazio
- (Italy) Lucchese
- (Italy) Milan
- (Italy) Modena
- (Italy) Napoli
- (Italy) Parma
- (Italy) Roma
- (Italy) Torino
- (Italy) Udinese

European teams

- (Germany) Bayer 04 Leverkusen
- (England) Nottingham Forest
- (France) Metz
- (Czechoslovakia) Dukla Prague
- (Russia) FC Dynamo Moscow
- (Hungary) Vasas

== Group stage ==
=== Group A ===
Team	Punti	Pld	W	D	L	GF	GA	GD
(Italy) Roma	5	3	2	1	0	4	1	+3
(Italy) Bari	4	3	1	2	0	3	1	+2
(Hungary) Vasas	2	3	0	2	0	0	2	-2
(Italy) Bologna	1	3	0	1	2	1	3	-2

=== Group B ===
Team	Punti	Pld	W	D	L	GF	GA	GD
(Italy) Napoli	5	3	2	1	0	5	1	+4
(Italy) Torino	4	3	2	0	1	5	2	+3
(Italy) Avellino	2	3	1	0	2	1	5	-4
(England) Nottingham Forest	1	3	0	1	2	2	5	-3

=== Group C ===
Team	Punti	Pld	W	D	L	GF	GA	GD
(Italy) Modena	4	3	1	2	0	6	1	+5
(Italy) Cesena	4	3	1	2	0	5	2	+3
(Italy) Juventus	3	3	0	3	0	4	4	0
(France) Metz	1	3	0	1	2	3	11	-8

=== Group D ===
Team	Punti	Pld	W	D	L	GF	GA	GD
(Italy) Milan	5	3	2	1	0	5	1	+4
(Italy) Parma	4	3	1	2	0	5	3	+2
(Czechoslovakia) Dukla Prague	2	3	0	2	0	3	5	-2
(Italy) Foggia	1	3	0	1	2	3	7	-4

=== Group E ===
Team	Punti	Pld	W	D	L	GF	GA	GD
(Italy) Inter Milan	5	3	2	1	0	5	2	+3
(Italy) Atalanta	4	3	1	2	0	4	1	+3
(Italy) Udinese	3	3	1	1	1	1	1	0
(Germany) Bayer 04 Leverkusen	0	3	0	0	3	3	9	-6

=== Group F ===
Team	Punti	Pld	W	D	L	GF	GA	GD
(Russia) FC Dynamo Moscow	6	3	3	0	0	6	3	+3
(Italy) Fiorentina	4	3	1	2	0	8	2	+6
(Italy) Lucchese	1	3	0	1	2	2	8	-6
(Italy) Lazio	1	3	0	1	2	2	5	-3

== Second round ==
(Italy) Torino	1 - 1 (6-5 pen)	(Italy) Roma

(Italy) Bari	2 - 1	(Italy) Napoli

(Italy) Parma	3 - 2	(Italy) Cesena

(Italy) Milan	5 - 0	(Italy) Modena

(Italy) Fiorentina	2 - 0	(Italy) Inter Milan

(Italy) Atalanta	1 - 0	(Russia) FC Dynamo Moscow

== Knockout stage ==
Quarter-finals
(Italy) Fiorentina	1
(Italy) Atalanta	0
(Italy) Milan (pen)	1 (4)
(Russia) FC Dynamo Moscow	1 (3)
(Italy) Roma (pen)	0 (4)
(Italy) Parma	0 (2)
(Italy) Torino	2
(Italy) Bari	1

Semi-finals
(Italy) Fiorentina	3
(Italy) Milan	0
(Italy) Roma pen	0 (3)
(Italy) Torino	0 (1)

Final
(Italy) Fiorentina	3
(Italy) Roma	2
Third place
(Italy) Milan	0
(Italy) Torino	1

== Champions ==
Torneo di Viareggio 1992 Champions

Fiorentina
8th time
