= 1995 Torneo di Viareggio =

1995 Torneo Mondiale di Calcio Coppa Carnevale
47° Torneo di Viareggio

Tournament details
- Host country: Italy
- City: Viareggio
- Dates: February 12, 1995 - March 1, 1995
- Teams: 24

Final positions
- Champions: (Italy) Torino
- Runners-up: (Italy) Fiorentina

Tournament statistics
- Matches played: 50
- Goals scored: 132 (2.64 per match)

The 1995 winners of the Torneo di Viareggio (in English, the Viareggio Tournament, officially the Viareggio Cup World Football Tournament Coppa Carnevale), the annual youth football tournament held in Viareggio, Tuscany, are listed below.

== Format ==
The 24 teams are seeded in 6 groups. Each team from a group meets the others in a single tie. The winning club and runners-up from each group progress to the second round. In the second round teams are split up in two groups and meet in a single tie (with penalties after regular time). Winners progress to the final knockout stage, along with the best losing club. The final round matches include 30 minutes extra time and penalties to be played, if the draw between teams still holds. The semifinals winning teams play the final with extra time and repeat the match if the draw holds.

== Participating teams ==
Italian teams

- (Italy) Bari
- (Italy) Brescia
- (Italy) Fiorentina
- (Italy) Inter Milan
- Italy U-20
- (Italy) Juventus
- (Italy) Lazio
- (Italy) Lucchese
- (Italy) Milan
- (Italy) Napoli
- (Italy) Noia
- (Italy) Padova
- (Italy) Palermo
- (Italy) Parma
- (Italy) Perugia
- (Italy) Reggina
- (Italy) Roma
- (Italy) Torino

European teams

- (Germany) Bayer 04 Leverkusen
- (England) Southampton
- (Spain) Espanyol

American teams

- (Mexico) Pumas

Asian teams

- (Japan) Yomiuri

Oceanian teams

- (Australia) Marconi Stallions

== Group stage ==
=== Group 1 ===
Team	Pts	Pld	W	D	L	GF	GA	GD
(Italy) Fiorentina	7	3	2	1	0	6	0	+6
(Italy) Parma	6	3	2	0	1	3	3	0
Italy U-20	4	3	1	1	1	3	2	+1
(Mexico) Pumas	0	3	0	0	3	1	8	-7

=== Group 2 ===
Team	Pts	Pld	W	D	L	GF	GA	GD
(Italy) Napoli	7	3	2	1	0	10	2	+8
(Italy) Milan	6	3	2	0	1	6	6	0
(Italy) Noia	4	3	1	1	1	7	6	+1
(England) Southampton	0	3	0	0	3	2	11	-9

=== Group 3 ===
Team	Pts	Pld	W	D	L	GF	GA	GD
(Italy) Lucchese	5	3	1	2	0	3	0	+3
(Italy) Torino	5	3	1	2	1	3	2	+1
(Italy) Lazio	2	3	0	2	1	1	2	-1
(Japan) Yomiuri	2	3	0	2	1	3	6	-3

=== Group 4 ===
Team	Pts	Pld	W	D	L	GF	GA	GD
(Italy) Padova	6	3	2	0	1	6	4	+2
(Italy) Perugia	5	3	1	2	0	2	0	+2
(Italy) Roma	4	3	1	1	1	1	1	0
(Germany) Bayer 04 Leverkusen	1	3	0	1	2	2	6	-4

=== Group 5 ===
Team	Pts	Pld	W	D	L	GF	GA	GD
(Italy) Brescia	6	3	2	0	1	6	2	+4
(Spain) Espanyol	6	3	2	0	1	4	5	-1
(Italy) Reggina	3	3	1	0	2	2	3	-1
(Italy) Inter Milan	3	3	1	0	2	3	5	-2

=== Group 6 ===
Team	Pts	Pld	W	D	L	GF	GA	GD
(Italy) Juventus	7	3	2	1	0	9	2	+7
(Italy) Palermo	5	3	1	2	0	9	1	+6
(Italy) Bari	4	3	1	1	1	9	2	+7
(Australia) Marconi Stallions	2	3	0	2	1	0	22	-22

== Second round ==
(Italy) Perugia	0 - 0 (8-7 pen)	(Italy) Lucchese

(Italy) Parma	2 - 1	(Italy) Napoli

(Italy) Fiorentina	2 - 1	(Italy) Milan

(Italy) Torino	2 - 2 (4-2 pen)	(Italy) Padova

(Italy) Palermo	1 - 1 (5-4 pen)	(Italy) Brescia

(Italy) Juventus	2 - 0	(Spain) Espanyol

== Knockout stage ==
Quarter-finals
23 February
(Italy) Perugia	2
(Italy) Parma	1
23 February
(Italy) Fiorentina	1
(Italy) Lucchese	0
23 February
(Italy) Torino	1
(Italy) Palermo	0
23 February
(Italy) Padova	1
(Italy) Juventus	0

Semi-finals
25 February
(Italy) Perugia	0 (3)
(Italy) Fiorentina (pen)	0 (2)
25 February
(Italy) Torino	3
(Italy) Padova	2

Final
1 March
(Italy) Fiorentina	2 (1)
(Italy) Torino (pen)	2 (2)

== Champions ==
Torneo di Viareggio 1995 Champions

Torino
5th time
