= 1961 Torneo di Viareggio =

1961 Torneo Mondiale di Calcio Coppa Carnevale
13° Torneo di Viareggio

Tournament details
- Host country: Italy
- City: Viareggio
- Teams: 16

Final positions
- Champions: (Italy) Juventus
- Runners-up: (Italy) Lanerossi Vicenza
- Third place: (Italy) Inter Milan
- Fourth place: (Italy) Milan

Tournament statistics
- Matches played: 24
- Goals scored: 60 (2.5 per match)

The 1961 winners of the Torneo di Viareggio (in English, the Viareggio Tournament, officially the Viareggio Cup World Football Tournament Coppa Carnevale), the annual youth football tournament held in Viareggio, Tuscany, are listed below.

== Format ==
The 16 teams are organized in knockout rounds. The round of 16 are played in two-legs, while the rest of the rounds are single tie.

== Participating teams ==
Italian teams

- (Italy) Bologna
- (Italy) Fiorentina
- (Italy) Inter Milan
- (Italy) Juventus
- (Italy) L.R. Vicenza
- (Italy) Milan
- (Italy) Sampdoria
- (Italy) Torino
- (Italy) Udinese

European teams

- (Socialist Federal Republic of Yugoslavia) Partizan Beograd
- (Socialist Federal Republic of Yugoslavia) Rijeka
- (Socialist Federal Republic of Yugoslavia) Dinamo Zagreb
- (Czechoslovakia) Dukla Praha
- (Greece) Saloniki
- (Austria) Wiener SK
- (West Germany) Bayern München

== Tournament fixtures ==
First round
(West Germany) Bayern München	0	0	0
(Italy) Juventus	2	1	3
(Italy) Bologna	2	0	2
(Czechoslovakia) Dukla Praha	1	3	4
(Italy) Milan	2	1	3
(Italy) Sampdoria	0	0	0
(Socialist Federal Republic of Yugoslavia) Dinamo Zagreb	0	4	4
(Italy) Udinese	2	0	2
(Italy) Lanerossi Vicenza	2	0	2
(Socialist Federal Republic of Yugoslavia) Partizan Beograd	0	1	1
(Italy) Fiorentina	3	2	5
(Greece) Saloniki	0	1	1
(Italy) Inter	2	3	5
(Socialist Federal Republic of Yugoslavia) Rijeka	1	1	2
(Italy) Torino	3	5	8
(Austria) Wiener SK	0	2	2

Quarter-finals
(Italy) Juventus	4
(Czechoslovakia) Dukla Praha	0
(Italy) Milan(pen)	0 [5]
(Socialist Federal Republic of Yugoslavia) Dinamo Zagreb	0 [3]
(Italy) Lanerossi Vicenza	1
(Italy) Fiorentina	0
(Italy) Inter	1
(Italy) Torino	0

Semi-finals
(Italy) Juventus(pen)	0 [?]
(Italy) Milan	0 [?]
(Italy) L.R. Vicenza(pen)	3 [?]
(Italy) Inter	3 [?]

Final
(Italy) Juventus	2
(Italy) Lanerossi Vicenza	0
Third place
(Italy) Milan	0
(Italy) Inter	2

== Champions ==
Torneo di Viareggio 1961 champions
Juventus
1st title
