= 1950 Torneo di Viareggio =

1950 Torneo Mondiale di Calcio Coppa Carnevale
2° Torneo di Viareggio

Tournament details
- Host country: Italy
- City: Viareggio
- Teams: 12

Final positions
- Champions: (Italy) Sampdoria
- Runners-up: (Italy) Roma
- Third place: (Italy) Modena
- Fourth place: (Italy) Fiorentina

Tournament statistics
- Matches played: 12
- Goals scored: 44 (3.67 per match)

The 1950 winners of the Torneo di Viareggio (in English, the Viareggio Tournament, officially the Viareggio Cup World Football Tournament Coppa Carnevale), the annual youth football tournament held in Viareggio, Tuscany, are listed below.

== Format ==
The 12 teams are organized in knockout rounds, all played single tie. The four foreign teams had a bye to the quarter-finals.

== Participating teams ==
Italian teams

- (Italy) Fiorentina
- (Italy) Lazio
- (Italy) Milan
- (Italy) Modena
- (Italy) Novara
- (Italy) Roma
- (Italy) Sampdoria
- (Italy) Viareggio

European teams

- (Austria) First Vienna
- (France) Racing Paris
- (Switzerland) Servette
- (Free Territory of Trieste) Triestina

== Tournament fixtures ==
Qualification
(Italy) Sampdoria	3
(Italy) Viareggio	1
(Italy) Fiorentina	2
(Italy) Lazio	1
(Italy) Novara	1
(Italy) Roma	2
(Italy) Milan	0
(Italy) Modena	2

Quarter-finals
(Italy) Sampdoria	3
(Austria) First Vienna	1
(Italy) Fiorentina	8
(Switzerland) Servette	0
(Italy) Roma	1
(France) Racing Paris	0
(Italy) Modena	5
(Free Territory of Trieste) Triestina	0

Semi-finals
(Italy) Sampdoria	1
(Italy) Fiorentina	0
(Italy) Roma	5
(Italy) Modena	3

Final
(Italy) Sampdoria	2
(Italy) Roma	1
Third place
(Italy) Fiorentina	1
(Italy) Modena	1

== Champions ==
Torneo di Viareggio 1950 Champions

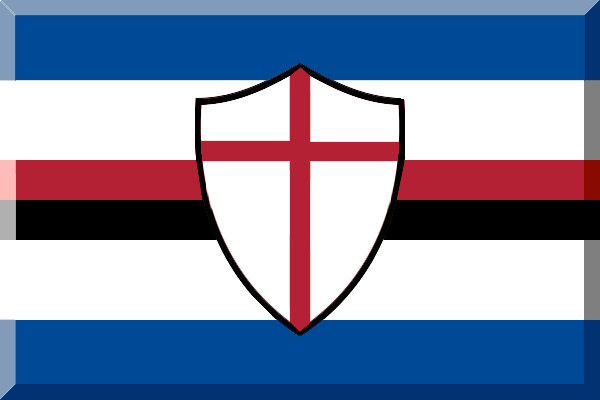

Sampdoria
1st time
