= 1949 Torneo di Viareggio =

1949 Torneo Mondiale di Calcio Coppa Carnevale
1° Torneo di Viareggio

Tournament details
- Host country: Italy
- City: Viareggio
- Teams: 10

Final positions
- Champions: (Italy) Milan
- Runners-up: (Italy) Lazio
- Third place: (Italy) Sampdoria
- Fourth place: (Switzerland) Bellinzona

Tournament statistics
- Matches played: 10
- Goals scored: 53 (5.3 per match)

The 1949 winners of the Torneo di Viareggio (in English, the Viareggio Tournament, officially the Viareggio Cup World Football Tournament Coppa Carnevale), the annual youth football tournament held in Viareggio, Tuscany, are listed below.

== Format ==
The 10 teams are organized in knockout rounds, all played single tie. Four teams have to play a preliminary knockout round to access quarter finals.

== Participating teams ==
Italian teams

- (Italy) Fiorentina
- (Italy) Lazio
- (Italy) Livorno
- (Italy) Lucchese
- (Italy) Milan
- (Italy) Sampdoria
- (Italy) Viareggio

European teams

- (France) Menton
- (France) Nice
- (Switzerland) Bellinzona

== Tournament fixtures ==
Qualification
(Italy) Livorno	1
(Italy) Viareggio	4
(Italy) Fiorentina	8
(Italy) Lucchese	0

Quarter-finals
(Italy) Viareggio	1
(Italy) Lazio	3
(France) Menton	1
(Italy) Sampdoria	7
(Italy) Fiorentina	0
(Switzerland) Bellinzona	0
(Italy) Milan	6
(France) Nice	3

Semi-finals
(Italy) Lazio	2
(Italy) Sampdoria	1
(Switzerland) Bellinzona	0
(Italy) Milan	4

Final
(Italy) Lazio	1
(Italy) Milan	5
Third place
(Italy) Sampdoria	5
(Switzerland) Bellinzona	1

== Champions ==
Torneo di Viareggio 1949 Champions

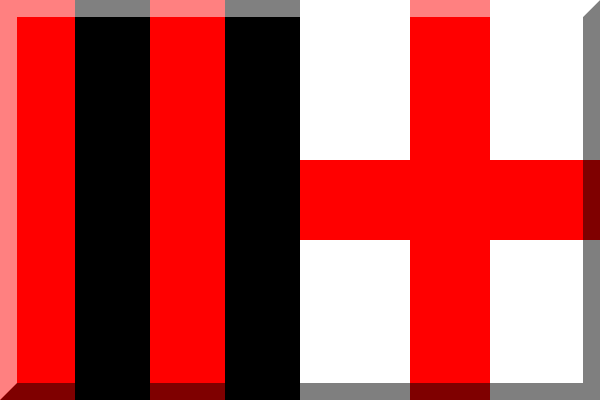

Milan
1st time
