= 1985 Torneo di Viareggio =

1985 Torneo Mondiale di Calcio Coppa Carnevale
37° Torneo di Viareggio

Tournament details
- Host country: Italy
- City: Viareggio
- Teams: 16

Final positions
- Champions: (Italy) Torino
- Runners-up: (Italy) Roma
- Third place: (Soviet Union) Spartak Moskva
- Fourth place: (Italy) Atalanta

Tournament statistics
- Matches played: 30
- Goals scored: 67 (2.23 per match)

The 1985 winners of the Torneo di Viareggio (in English, the Viareggio Tournament, officially the Viareggio Cup World Football Tournament Coppa Carnevale), the annual youth football tournament held in Viareggio, Tuscany, are listed below.

== Format ==
The 16 teams are seeded in 4 groups. Each team from a group meets the others in a single tie. The winner of each group progress to the final knockout stage.

== Participating teams ==
Italian teams

- (Italy) Atalanta
- (Italy) Fiorentina
- (Italy) Genoa
- (Italy) Inter Milan
- (Italy) Milan
- (Italy) Napoli
- (Italy) Roma
- (Italy) Sampdoria
- (Italy) Torino

European teams

- (England) Nottingham Forest
- (Scotland) Aberdeen
- (Netherlands) Ajax
- (Romania) Universitatea Craiova
- (Socialist Federal Republic of Yugoslavia) Sarajevo
- (Socialist Federal Republic of Yugoslavia) Rijeka
- (Soviet Union) Spartak Moskva

== Group stage ==
=== Group A ===
Team	Pts	Pld	W	D	L	GF	GA	GD
(Italy) Torino	5	3	2	1	0	6	3	+3
(Italy) Genoa	4	3	2	0	1	5	3	+2
(England) Nottingham Forest	3	3	1	1	1	2	2	0
(Netherlands) Ajax	0	3	0	0	3	2	7	-5

=== Group B ===
Team	Pts	Pld	W	D	L	GF	GA	GD
(Soviet Union) Spartak Moskva	6	3	3	0	0	4	1	+3
(Italy) Milan	3	3	1	1	1	2	1	+1
(Italy) Napoli	3	3	1	1	1	2	1	+1
(Socialist Federal Republic of Yugoslavia) Sarajevo	0	3	0	0	3	1	6	-5

=== Group C ===
Team	Pts	Pld	W	D	L	GF	GA	GD
(Italy) Sampdoria	4	3	1	2	0	4	3	+1
(Italy) Roma	4	3	2	0	1	4	2	+2
(Italy) Inter	3	3	1	1	1	2	2	0
(Socialist Federal Republic of Yugoslavia) Rijeka	1	3	0	1	2	2	5	-3

=== Group D ===
Team	Pts	Pld	W	D	L	GF	GA	GD
(Italy) Atalanta	5	3	2	1	0	5	1	+4
(Italy) Fiorentina	4	3	2	0	1	5	2	+3
(Scotland) Aberdeen	2	3	0	2	1	3	5	-2
(Romania) Universitatea Craiova	1	3	0	1	2	2	7	-5

== Knockout stage ==
Quarter-finals
(Italy) Torino	3
(Italy) Milan	0
(Soviet Union) Spartak Moskva	2
(Italy) Genoa	0
(Italy) Roma	2
(Italy) Fiorentina	1
(Italy) Atalanta(pen)	1
(Italy) Sampdoria	1

Semi-finals
(Italy) Torino(pen)	1
(Soviet Union) Spartak Moskva	1
(Italy) Roma(pen)	1
(Italy) Atalanta	1

Final
(Italy) Torino	1
(Italy) Roma	0
Third place
(Soviet Union) Spartak Moskva	1
(Italy) Atalanta	0

== Champions ==
Torneo di Viareggio 1985 Champions

Torino
2nd time
