= 1981 Torneo di Viareggio =

1981 Torneo Mondiale di Calcio Coppa Carnevale
33° Torneo di Viareggio

Tournament details
- Host country: Italy
- City: Viareggio
- Teams: 16

Final positions
- Champions: (Italy) Roma
- Runners-up: (England) Ipswich Town
- Third place: (Italy) Napoli
- Fourth place: (Italy) Juventus

Tournament statistics
- Matches played: 32
- Goals scored: 88 (2.75 per match)

The 1981 winners of the Torneo di Viareggio (in English, the Viareggio Tournament, officially the Viareggio Cup World Football Tournament Coppa Carnevale), the annual youth football tournament held in Viareggio, Tuscany, are listed below.

== Format ==
The 16 teams are seeded in 4 groups. Each team from a group meets the others in a single tie. The winner of each group progresses to the final knockout stage.

== Participating teams ==
Italian teams

- (Italy) Brescia
- (Italy) Como
- (Italy) Fiorentina
- (Italy) Juventus
- (Italy) Milan
- (Italy) Napoli
- (Italy) Pistoiese
- (Italy) Roma
- (Italy) Udinese

European teams

- (England) Ipswich Town
- (Czechoslovakia) Dukla Praha
- (Socialist Federal Republic of Yugoslavia) Crvena zvezda
- (West Germany) Bayer Leverkusen
- (Portugal) Porto
- (Hungary) Újpesti Dózsa

American teams

- Mexico City

== Group stage ==
=== Group A ===
Team	Pts	Pld	W	D	L	GF	GA	GD
(Italy) Napoli	5	3	2	1	0	5	2	+3
(England) Ipswich Town	4	3	2	0	1	5	2	+3
(Italy) Udinese	3	3	1	1	1	2	4	-2
(Czechoslovakia) Dukla Praha	0	3	0	0	3	0	4	-4

=== Group B ===
Team	Pts	Pld	W	D	L	GF	GA	GD
(Socialist Federal Republic of Yugoslavia) Crvena zvezda	5	3	2	1	0	6	2	+4
(Italy) Milan	5	3	2	1	0	6	3	+3
(Italy) Pistoiese	2	3	1	0	2	4	4	0
(West Germany) Bayer Leverkusen	0	3	0	0	3	1	8	-7

=== Group C ===
Team	Pts	Pld	W	D	L	GF	GA	GD
(Italy) Roma	4	3	2	0	1	9	2	+7
(Italy) Juventus	4	3	2	0	1	6	3	+3
(Italy) Brescia	3	3	1	1	1	5	6	-1
(Portugal) Porto	1	3	0	1	2	2	11	-9

=== Group D ===
Team	Pts	Pld	W	D	L	GF	GA	GD
(Italy) Como	5	3	2	1	0	4	2	+2
(Italy) Fiorentina	4	3	2	0	1	7	2	+5
Mexico City	2	3	0	2	1	3	4	-1
(Hungary) Újpesti Dózsa	1	3	0	1	2	2	8	-6

== Knockout stage ==
Quarter-finals
(Italy) Como	1
(Italy) Juventus(pen)	1
(Italy) Fiorentina	2
(Italy) Roma	3
(Socialist Federal Republic of Yugoslavia) Crvena zvezda	0
(England) Ipswich Town	3
(Italy) Milan	0
(Italy) Napoli(pen)	0

Semi-finals
(Italy) Juventus	2
(Italy) Roma(pen)	0
(England) Ipswich Town	2
(Italy) Napoli	0

Final
(Italy) Roma	2
(England) Ipswich Town	0
Third place
(Italy) Juventus	1
(Italy) Napoli	2

== Champions ==
Torneo di Viareggio 1981 Champions

Roma
1st time
