= 1970 Torneo di Viareggio =

1970 Torneo Mondiale di Calcio Coppa Carnevale
22° Torneo di Viareggio

Tournament details
- Host country: Italy
- City: Viareggio
- Teams: 16

Final positions
- Champions: (Czechoslovakia) Dukla Praha
- Runners-up: (Italy) Milan
- Third place: (Socialist Federal Republic of Yugoslavia) Partizan Beograd
- Fourth place: (Socialist Federal Republic of Yugoslavia) Rijeka

Tournament statistics
- Matches played: 24
- Goals scored: 47 (1.96 per match)

The 1970 winners of the Torneo di Viareggio (in English, the Viareggio Tournament, officially the Viareggio Cup World Football Tournament Coppa Carnevale), the annual youth football tournament held in Viareggio, Tuscany, are listed below.

== Format ==
The 16 teams are organized in knockout rounds. The round of 16 are played in two-legs, while the rest of the rounds are single tie.

== Participating teams ==
Italian teams

- (Italy) Atalanta
- (Italy) Fiorentina
- (Italy) Inter Milan
- (Italy) Juventus
- (Italy) Lanerossi Vicenza
- (Italy) Milan
- (Italy) Roma
- (Italy) Torino

European teams

- (West Germany) Bayern München
- (Czechoslovakia) Dukla Praha
- (Socialist Federal Republic of Yugoslavia) Partizan Beograd
- (Socialist Federal Republic of Yugoslavia) Rijeka
- (Bulgaria) CSKA Sofia
- (Portugal) Benfica
- (Romania) Steaua București

American teams

- (Argentina) Boca Juniors

== Tournament fixtures ==
First round
(Portugal) Benfica	0	1	1
(Italy) Milan	2	3	5
(Bulgaria) CSKA Sofia	1	0	1
(Italy) Torino	3	2	5
(Italy) Juventus	1	0	1 [2]
(Socialist Federal Republic of Yugoslavia) Rijeka(pen)	0	1	1 [6]
(Argentina) Boca Juniors	4	2	6
(Italy) Roma	1	0	1
(Italy) Atalanta	0	0	0
(Czechoslovakia) Dukla Praha	0	1	1
(Italy) Inter	0	1	1
(Romania) Steaua București	0	0	0
(Italy) Lanerossi Vicenza	0	0	0
(Socialist Federal Republic of Yugoslavia) Partizan Beograd	1	1	2
(West Germany) Bayern München	0	1	1
(Italy) Fiorentina	2	1	3

Quarter-finals
(Italy) Milan	1
(Italy) Torino	0
(Socialist Federal Republic of Yugoslavia) Rijeka	2
(Argentina) Boca Juniors	1
(Czechoslovakia) Dukla Praha	2
(Italy) Inter	0
(Socialist Federal Republic of Yugoslavia) Partizan Beograd	1
(Italy) Fiorentina	0

Semi-finals
(Italy) Milan	1
(Socialist Federal Republic of Yugoslavia) Rijeka	0
(Czechoslovakia) Dukla Praha	4
(Socialist Federal Republic of Yugoslavia) Partizan Beograd	1

Final
(Italy) Milan	0
(Czechoslovakia) Dukla Praha	1
Third place
(Socialist Federal Republic of Yugoslavia) Rijeka	0
(Socialist Federal Republic of Yugoslavia) Partizan Beograd	4

== Champions ==
Torneo di Viareggio 1970 champions
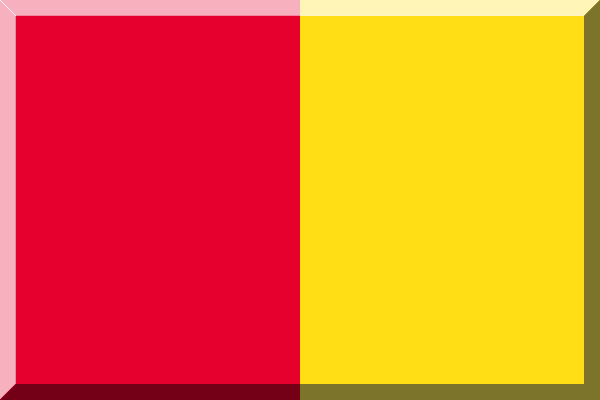
Dukla Praha
3rd title
