= 1973 Torneo di Viareggio =

Instance of an annual youth football tournament in Tuscany

1973 Torneo Mondiale di Calcio Coppa Carnevale
25° Torneo di Viareggio

Tournament details
- Host country: Italy
- City: Viareggio
- Teams: 16

Final positions
- Champions: (Italy) Fiorentina
- Runners-up: (Italy) Bologna
- Third place: (Romania) Steaua București
- Fourth place: (England) Crystal Palace

Tournament statistics
- Matches played: 24
- Goals scored: 55 (2.29 per match)

The 1973 winners of the Torneo di Viareggio (in English, the Viareggio Tournament, officially the Viareggio Cup World Football Tournament Coppa Carnevale), the annual youth football tournament held in Viareggio, Tuscany, are listed below.

== Format ==
The 16 teams are organized in knockout rounds. The round of 16 is played in two-legs, while the rest of the rounds are single tie.

== Participating teams ==
Italian teams

- (Italy) Atalanta
- (Italy) Bologna
- (Italy) Fiorentina
- (Italy) Lazio
- (Italy) L.R. Vicenza
- (Italy) Milan
- (Italy) Napoli
- (Italy) Torino

European teams

- (Hungary) Újpest Dózsa
- (Czechoslovakia) Dukla Praha
- (Socialist Federal Republic of Yugoslavia) Dinamo Zagreb
- (Scotland) Rangers
- (West Germany) Bayern München
- (Portugal) Benfica
- (Romania) Steaua B.
- (England) Crystal Palace

== Tournament fixtures ==
First round
(Italy) Bologna	2	2	4
(Scotland) Rangers	1	1	2
(Portugal) Benfica	1	2	3 [?]
(Italy) Torino(pen)	0	3	3 [?]
(Italy) Milan	1	1	2 [?]
(Romania) Steaua B.(pen)	0	2	2 [?]
(West Germany) Bayern München	0	2	2
(Italy) L.R. Vicenza	1	5	6
(Socialist Federal Republic of Yugoslavia) Dinamo Zagreb	0	0	0
(Italy) Fiorentina	1	0	1
(Italy) Lazio	2	0	2
(Hungary) Újpesti Dózsa	2	2	4
(England) Crystal Palace	1	2	3
(Italy) Napoli	1	1	2
(Italy) Atalanta	1	1	2 [?]
(Czechoslovakia) Dukla Praha(pen)	1	1	2 [?]

Quarter-finals
(Italy) Bologna	1
(Portugal) Benfica	0
(Romania) Steaua București	2
(Italy) Lanerossi Vicenza	0
(Italy) Fiorentina	2
(Hungary) Újpesti Dózsa	1
(England) Crystal Palace	1
(Czechoslovakia) Dukla Praha	0

Semi-finals
(Italy) Bologna(pen)	2 [?]
(Romania) Steaua București	2 [?]
(Italy) Fiorentina	1
(England) Crystal Palace	0

Final
(Italy) Bologna	0
(Italy) Fiorentina	1
Third place
(Romania) Steaua București	2
(England) Crystal Palace	0

== Champions ==
Torneo di Viareggio 1973 champions
Fiorentina
2nd title
