= 1977 Torneo di Viareggio =

1977 Torneo Mondiale di Calcio Coppa Carnevale
29° Torneo di Viareggio

Tournament details
- Host country: Italy
- City: Viareggio
- Teams: 16

Final positions
- Champions: (Italy) Sampdoria
- Runners-up: (Italy) Milan
- Third place: (Italy) Perugia
- Fourth place: (Italy) Fiorentina

Tournament statistics
- Matches played: 30
- Goals scored: 73 (2.43 per match)

The 1977 winners of the Torneo di Viareggio (in English, the Viareggio Tournament, officially the Viareggio Cup World Football Tournament Coppa Carnevale), the annual youth football tournament held in Viareggio, Tuscany, are listed below.

== Format ==
The 16 teams are seeded in 4 groups. Each team from a group meets the others in a single tie. The winner of each group progress to the final knockout stage.

== Participating teams ==
Italian teams

- (Italy) Fiorentina
- (Italy) Genoa
- (Italy) Inter Milan
- (Italy) Lazio
- (Italy) Milan
- (Italy) Napoli
- (Italy) Perugia
- (Italy) Sampdoria
- (Italy) Verona

European teams

- (Czechoslovakia) Dukla Praha
- (West Germany) Eintracht Frankfurt
- (Scotland) Rangers
- (Poland) Wisła Kraków
- (Socialist Federal Republic of Yugoslavia) Hajduk Split
- (Hungary) Újpesti Dózsa
- (Netherlands) Amsterdam

== Group stage ==
=== Group A ===
Team	Pts	Pld	W	D	L	GF	GA	GD
(West Germany) Eintracht Frankfurt	4	3	1	2	0	5	4	+1
(Italy) Genoa	3	3	0	3	0	5	5	0
(Italy) Napoli	3	3	0	3	0	3	3	0
(Czechoslovakia) Dukla Praha	2	3	0	2	1	4	5	-1

=== Group B ===
Team	Pts	Pld	W	D	L	GF	GA	GD
(Italy) Milan	5	3	2	1	0	5	0	+5
(Italy) Perugia	4	3	1	2	0	1	0	+1
(Scotland) Rangers	3	3	1	1	1	2	3	-1
(Poland) Wisła Kraków	0	3	0	0	3	0	5	-5

=== Group C ===
Team	Pts	Pld	W	D	L	GF	GA	GD
(Italy) Inter	5	3	2	1	0	4	0	+4
(Socialist Federal Republic of Yugoslavia) Hajduk Split	3	3	1	1	1	5	2	+3
(Italy) Lazio	3	3	1	1	1	1	1	0
(Hungary) Újpesti Dózsa	1	3	0	1	2	1	8	-7

=== Group D ===
Team	Pts	Pld	W	D	L	GF	GA	GD
(Italy) Sampdoria	5	3	2	1	0	7	2	+5
(Italy) Fiorentina	4	3	2	0	1	3	2	+1
(Netherlands) Amsterdam	2	3	1	0	2	3	6	-3
(Italy) Verona	1	3	0	1	2	2	5	-3

== Knockout stage ==
Quarter-finals
(Italy) Genoa	0
(Italy) Milan	6
(West Germany) Eintracht Frankfurt	0
(Italy) Perugia(pen)	0
(Socialist Federal Republic of Yugoslavia) Hajduk Split	1
(Italy) Sampdoria(pen)	1
(Italy) Fiorentina	2
(Italy) Inter	0

Semi-finals
(Italy) Milan	2
(Italy) Perugia	1
(Italy) Sampdoria	2
(Italy) Fiorentina	1

Final
(Italy) Milan	1
(Italy) Sampdoria	2
Third place
(Italy) Perugia	1
(Italy) Fiorentina	0

== Champions ==
Torneo di Viareggio 1977 Champions

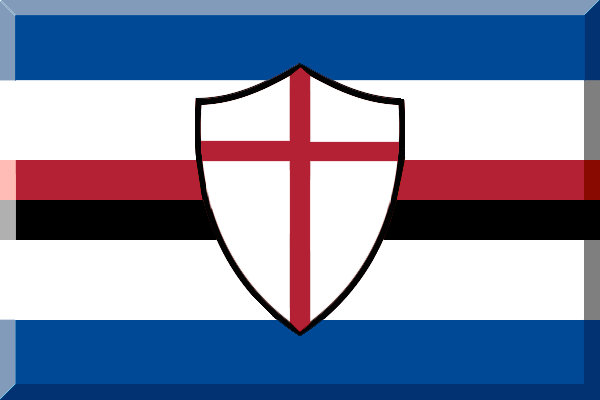

Sampdoria
4th time
