= 1965 Torneo di Viareggio =

1965 Torneo Mondiale di Calcio Coppa Carnevale
17° Torneo di Viareggio

Tournament details
- Host country: Italy
- City: Viareggio
- Teams: 16

Final positions
- Champions: (Italy) Genoa
- Runners-up: (Italy) Juventus
- Third place: (Italy) Milan
- Fourth place: (Hungary) Ferencváros

Tournament statistics
- Matches played: 24
- Goals scored: 55 (2.29 per match)

The 1965 winners of the Torneo di Viareggio (in English, the Viareggio Tournament, officially the Viareggio Cup World Football Tournament Coppa Carnevale), the annual youth football tournament held in Viareggio, Tuscany, are listed below.

== Format ==
The 16 teams are organized in knockout rounds. The round of 16 are played in two-legs, while the rest of the rounds are single tie.

== Participating teams ==
Italian teams

- (Italy) Bologna
- (Italy) Fiorentina
- (Italy) Genoa
- (Italy) Inter Milan
- (Italy) Juventus
- (Italy) Lazio
- (Italy) Milan
- (Italy) Torino

European teams

- Austria Wien
- (Czechoslovakia) Dukla Praha
- (Socialist Federal Republic of Yugoslavia) Crvena zvezda
- (West Germany) Augsburg
- (Belgium) Gand
- (France) Toulon
- (Hungary) Ferencváros
- (Socialist Federal Republic of Yugoslavia) Dinamo Zagreb

== Tournament fixtures ==
First round
(Socialist Federal Republic of Yugoslavia) Crvena zvezda | 2 | 0 | 2
(Italy) Genoa | 4 | 0 | 4
(Italy) Fiorentina | 2 | 2 | 4
(France) Toulon | 1 | 0 | 1
(Belgium) Gand | 0 | 1 | 1
(Italy) Milan | 4 | 8 | 12
(Czechoslovakia) Dukla Praha (pen) | 0 | 0 | 0 [6]
(Italy) Torino | 0 | 0 | 0 [5]
Austria Wien | 0 | 0 | 0
(Italy) Juventus | 2 | 0 | 2
(West Germany) Augsburg | 1 | 1 | 2
(Italy) Bologna | 5 | 0 | 5
(Hungary) Ferencváros | 0 | 1 | 1
(Italy) Lazio | 0 | 0 | 0
(Socialist Federal Republic of Yugoslavia) Dinamo Zagreb | 1 | 1 | 2
(Italy) Inter | 1 | 0 | 1

Quarter-finals
(Italy) Genoa | 1
(Italy) Fiorentina | 0
(Italy) Milan | 2
(Czechoslovakia) Dukla Praha | 0
(Italy) Juventus | 2
(Italy) Bologna | 1
(Hungary) Ferencváros | 1
(Socialist Federal Republic of Yugoslavia) Dinamo Zagreb | 0

Semi-finals
(Italy) Genoa | 2
(Italy) Milan | 0
(Italy) Juventus | 2
(Hungary) Ferencváros | 1

Final
(Italy) Genoa (pen) | 2 [4]
(Italy) Juventus | 2 [4]
Third place
(Italy) Milan | 1
(Hungary) Ferencváros | 0

== Champions ==
Torneo di Viareggio 1965 champions
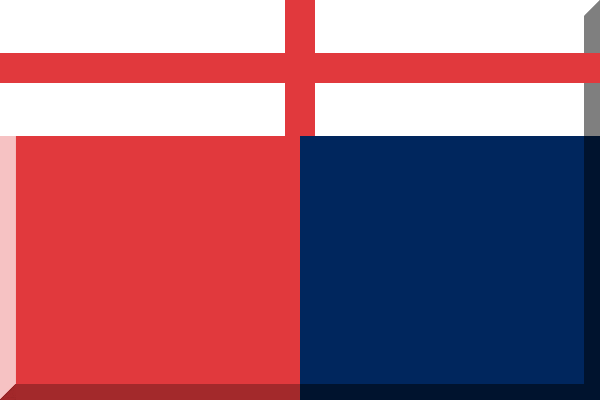
Genoa
1st title
