= 1967 Torneo di Viareggio =

1967 Torneo Mondiale di Calcio Coppa Carnevale
19° Torneo di Viareggio

Tournament details
- Host country: Italy
- City: Viareggio
- Teams: 16

Final positions
- Champions: (Italy) Bologna
- Runners-up: (Italy) Fiorentina
- Third place: (Italy) Roma
- Fourth place: (Italy) Milan

Tournament statistics
- Matches played: 24
- Goals scored: 61 (2.54 per match)

The 1967 winners of the Torneo di Viareggio (in English, the Viareggio Tournament, officially the Viareggio Cup World Football Tournament Coppa Carnevale), the annual youth football tournament held in Viareggio, Tuscany, are listed below.

== Format ==
The 16 teams are organized in knockout rounds. The round of 16 are played in two-legs, while the rest of the rounds are single tie.

== Participating teams ==
Italian teams

- (Italy) Bologna
- (Italy) Brescia
- (Italy) Fiorentina
- (Italy) Juventus
- (Italy) Milan
- (Italy) Napoli
- (Italy) Roma
- (Italy) Torino

European teams

- (West Germany) Eintracht Frankfurt
- (Czechoslovakia) Dukla Praha
- (Socialist Federal Republic of Yugoslavia) Red Star Belgrade
- (Socialist Federal Republic of Yugoslavia) Vojvodina
- (Soviet Union) Burevestnik
- (France) Stade de Reims
- (Bulgaria) CSKA Sofia
- (Spain) Barcelona

== Tournament fixtures ==
First round
(Italy) Bologna	0	1	1
(Socialist Federal Republic of Yugoslavia) Vojvodina	0	0	0
(Italy) Brescia	0	5	5
(Soviet Union) Burevestnik	5	2	7
(Bulgaria) CSKA Sofia	0	0	0
(Italy) Roma	1	1	2
(Socialist Federal Republic of Yugoslavia) Crvena zvezda	2	1	3
(Italy) Juventus	3	2	5
(Italy) Fiorentina	1	0	1
(France) Stade de Reims	0	0	0
(Spain) Barcelona	4	3	7
(Italy) Napoli	2	3	5
(West Germany) Eintracht Frankfurt	1	0	1
(Italy) Milan	2	1	3
(Czechoslovakia) Dukla Praha	2	0	2
(Italy) Torino	3	0	3

Quarter-finals
(Italy) Bologna	1
(Soviet Union) Burevestnik	0
(Italy) Roma(pen)	0 [6]
(Italy) Juventus	0 [3]
(Italy) Fiorentina	2
(Spain) Barcelona	0
(Italy) Milan	3
(Italy) Torino	1

Semi-finals
(Italy) Bologna	2
(Italy) Roma	0
(Italy) Fiorentina(pen)	0 [3]
(Italy) Milan	0 [2]

Final
(Italy) Bologna(aet)	3
(Italy) Fiorentina	2
Third place
(Italy) Roma(pen)	1 [4]
(Italy) Milan	1 [3]

== Champions ==
Torneo di Viareggio 1967 champions
Bologna
1st title
