= 1951 Torneo di Viareggio =

1951 Torneo Mondiale di Calcio Coppa Carnevale
3° Torneo di Viareggio

Tournament details
- Host country: Italy
- City: Viareggio
- Teams: 12

Final positions
- Champions: (Socialist Federal Republic of Yugoslavia) Partizan Beograd
- Runners-up: (Italy) Sampdoria
- Third place: (Austria) First Vienna
- Fourth place: (France) Racing Paris

Tournament statistics
- Matches played: 12

The 1951 winners of the Torneo di Viareggio (in English, the Viareggio Tournament, officially the Viareggio Cup World Football Tournament Coppa Carnevale), the annual youth football tournament held in Viareggio, Tuscany, are listed below.

== Format ==
The four foreign teams have been spared the initiali knockout round and started directly in the Round of 8. All game were single tie.

== Participating teams ==
Italian teams

- (Italy) Atalanta
- (Italy) Bologna
- (Italy) Fiorentina
- (Italy) Inter Milan
- (Italy) Lazio
- (Italy) Milan
- (Italy) Sampdoria
- (Italy) Viareggio

European teams

- (Socialist Federal Republic of Yugoslavia) Partizan Beograd
- (Socialist Federal Republic of Yugoslavia) Dinamo Zagreb
- (Austria) First Vienna
- (France) Racing Paris

== Tournament fixtures ==
Quarter finals
(Italy) Sampdoria	3
(Socialist Federal Republic of Yugoslavia) Dinamo Zagreb	1
(Austria) First Vienna	2
(Italy) Inter Milan	1
(Socialist Federal Republic of Yugoslavia) Partizan Beograd	2
(Italy) Bologna	1
(France) Racing Paris	1
(Italy) Fiorentina	0

Semifinals
(Italy) Sampdoria	3
(Austria) First Vienna	1
(Socialist Federal Republic of Yugoslavia) Partizan Beograd	2
(France) Racing Paris	1

Final
(Italy) Sampdoria	1
(Socialist Federal Republic of Yugoslavia) Partizan Beograd	2
Third place
(Austria) First Vienna	1
(France) Racing Paris	1

== Champions ==
Torneo di Viareggio 1951 Champions

Partizan Beograd
1st time
