= 1952 Torneo di Viareggio =

1952 Torneo Mondiale di Calcio Coppa Carnevale
4° Torneo di Viareggio

Tournament details
- Host country: Italy
- City: Viareggio
- Teams: 16

Final positions
- Champions: (Italy) Milan
- Runners-up: (Socialist Federal Republic of Yugoslavia) Partizan Beograd
- Third place: (Italy) Inter Milan
- Fourth place: (Italy) Fiorentina

Tournament statistics
- Matches played: 16
- Goals scored: 60 (3.75 per match)

The 1952 winners of the Torneo di Viareggio (in English, the Viareggio Tournament, officially the Viareggio Cup World Football Tournament Coppa Carnevale), the annual youth football tournament held in Viareggio, Tuscany, are listed below.

== Format ==
The 16 teams are organized in knockout rounds, all played single tie.

== Participating teams ==
Italian teams

- (Italy) Bologna
- (Italy) Fiorentina
- (Italy) Genoa
- (Italy) Inter Milan
- (Italy) Milan
- (Italy) Napoli
- (Italy) Novara
- (Italy) Sampdoria
- (Italy) Viareggio

European teams

- (Socialist Federal Republic of Yugoslavia) Partizan Beograd
- (Socialist Federal Republic of Yugoslavia) Dinamo Zagreb
- (West Germany) 1860 München
- (Austria) First Vienna
- (France) Nice
- (France) Racing Paris
- (Switzerland) Bern

== Tournament fixtures ==
Round of 16
(Italy) Milan	4
(West Germany) 1860 München	0
(Italy) Bologna	1
(Austria) First Vienna	0
(Italy) Fiorentina	1
(France) Nice	0
(Socialist Federal Republic of Yugoslavia) Dinamo Zagreb	1
(Italy) Sampdoria	3
(Switzerland) Bern	1
(Italy) Inter	8
(Italy) Novara	1
(France) Racing Paris	3
(Italy) Genoa	0
(Socialist Federal Republic of Yugoslavia) Partizan Beograd	2
(Italy) Napoli	0
(Italy) Viareggio	3

Quarter-finals
(Italy) Milan	2
(Italy) Bologna	1
(Italy) Fiorentina	2
(Italy) Sampdoria	1
(Italy) Inter	5
(France) Racing Paris	1
(Socialist Federal Republic of Yugoslavia) Partizan Beograd	4
(Italy) Viareggio	1

Semi-finals
(Italy) Milan	3
(Italy) Fiorentina	0
(Italy) Inter	1
(Socialist Federal Republic of Yugoslavia) Partizan Beograd	2

Final
(Italy) Milan	3
(Socialist Federal Republic of Yugoslavia) Partizan Beograd	1
Third place
(Italy) Fiorentina	1
(Italy) Inter	4

== Champions ==
Torneo di Viareggio 1952 Champions

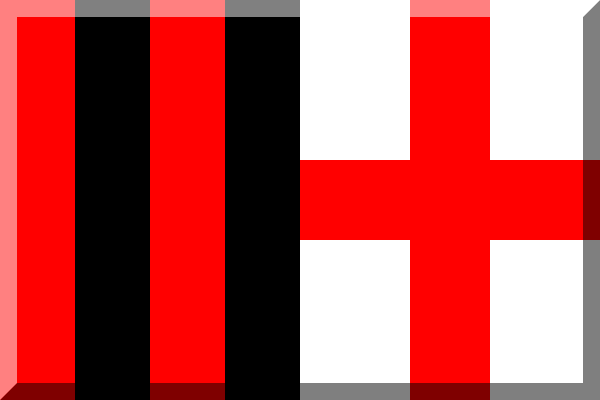

Milan
2nd time
