= 1984 Torneo di Viareggio =

1984 Torneo Mondiale di Calcio Coppa Carnevale
36° Torneo di Viareggio

Tournament details
- Host country: Italy
- City: Viareggio
- Teams: 16

Final positions
- Champions: (Italy) Torino
- Runners-up: (Italy) Napoli
- Third place: (Italy) Fiorentina
- Fourth place: (Italy) Roma

Tournament statistics
- Matches played: 30
- Goals scored: 109 (3.63 per match)

The 1984 winners of the Torneo di Viareggio (in English, the Viareggio Tournament, officially the Viareggio Cup World Football Tournament Coppa Carnevale), the annual youth football tournament held in Viareggio, Tuscany, are listed below.

== Format ==
The 16 teams are seeded in 4 groups. Each team from a group meets the others in a single tie. The winner of each group progress to the final knockout stage.

== Participating teams ==
Italian teams

- (Italy) Fiorentina
- (Italy) Inter Milan
- (Italy) Lazio
- (Italy) Milan
- (Italy) Napoli
- (Italy) Pisa
- (Italy) Roma
- (Italy) Torino

European teams

- (England) Nottingham Forest
- (Czechoslovakia) Dukla Praha
- (Socialist Federal Republic of Yugoslavia) Dinamo Zagreb
- (Netherlands) Groningen
- (Romania) Universitatea Craiova
- (West Germany) Eintracht Frankfurt

American teams

- (Chile) Santiago

African teams

- Algeria

== Group stage ==
=== Group A ===
| Team | Pts | Pld | W | D | L | GF | GA | GD |
|---|---|---|---|---|---|---|---|---|
| (Czechoslovakia) Dukla Praha | 6 | 3 | 3 | 0 | 0 | 4 | 1 | +3 |
| (Italy) Roma | 2 | 3 | 1 | 0 | 2 | 5 | 5 | 0 |
| (Italy) Pisa | 2 | 3 | 1 | 0 | 2 | 4 | 6 | -2 |
| (Romania) Universitatea Craiova | 2 | 3 | 1 | 0 | 2 | 5 | 6 | -1 |

=== Group B ===
| Team | Pts | Pld | W | D | L | GF | GA | GD |
|---|---|---|---|---|---|---|---|---|
| (Italy) Napoli | 4 | 3 | 2 | 0 | 1 | 3 | 1 | +2 |
| (Italy) Inter | 4 | 3 | 2 | 0 | 1 | 5 | 3 | +2 |
| (Socialist Federal Republic of Yugoslavia) Dinamo Zagreb | 2 | 3 | 1 | 0 | 2 | 7 | 5 | +2 |
| (Netherlands) Groningen | 2 | 3 | 1 | 0 | 2 | 5 | 11 | -6 |

=== Group C ===
| Team | Pts | Pld | W | D | L | GF | GA | GD |
|---|---|---|---|---|---|---|---|---|
| (Italy) Milan | 6 | 3 | 3 | 0 | 0 | 9 | 1 | +8 |
| (England) Nottingham Forest | 4 | 3 | 2 | 0 | 1 | 8 | 5 | +3 |
| (Italy) Lazio | 2 | 3 | 1 | 0 | 2 | 4 | 7 | -3 |
| (Chile) Santiago | 0 | 3 | 0 | 0 | 3 | 1 | 9 | -8 |

=== Group D ===
| Team | Pts | Pld | W | D | L | GF | GA | GD |
|---|---|---|---|---|---|---|---|---|
| (Italy) Torino | 5 | 3 | 2 | 1 | 0 | 9 | 3 | +6 |
| (Italy) Fiorentina | 3 | 3 | 1 | 1 | 1 | 7 | 4 | +3 |
| (West Germany) Eintracht Frankfurt | 2 | 3 | 1 | 0 | 2 | 4 | 5 | -1 |
| Algeria | 2 | 3 | 1 | 1 | 1 | 5 | 13 | -8 |

== Knockout stage ==
Quarter-finals
(Czechoslovakia) Dukla Praha | 2
(Italy) Napoli(pen) | 2
(Italy) Inter | 2
(Italy) Roma(pen) | 2
(Italy) Torino | 4
(England) Nottingham Forest | 1
(Italy) Fiorentina | 2
(Italy) Milan | 0

Semi-finals
(Italy) Napoli(pen) | 0
(Italy) Roma | 0
(Italy) Torino | 2
(Italy) Fiorentina | 1

Final
(Italy) Napoli | 0
(Italy) Torino | 1
Third place
(Italy) Roma | 2
(Italy) Fiorentina | 3

== Champions ==
Torneo di Viareggio 1984 Champions

Torino
1st time
