= 1982 Torneo di Viareggio =

1982 Torneo Mondiale di Calcio Coppa Carnevale
34° Torneo di Viareggio

Tournament details
- Host country: Italy
- City: Viareggio
- Teams: 16

Final positions
- Champions: (Italy) Fiorentina
- Runners-up: (England) Ipswich Town
- Third place: (Czechoslovakia) Dukla Praha
- Fourth place: (Italy) Avellino

Tournament statistics
- Matches played: 32
- Goals scored: 55 (1.72 per match)

The 1982 winners of the Torneo di Viareggio (in English, the Viareggio Tournament, officially the Viareggio Cup World Football Tournament Coppa Carnevale), the annual youth football tournament held in Viareggio, Tuscany, are listed below.

== Format ==
The 16 teams are seeded in 4 groups. Each team from a group meets the others in a single tie. The winner of each group progress to the final knockout stage.

== Participating teams ==
Italian teams

- (Italy) Ascoli
- (Italy) Avellino
- (Italy) Catanzaro
- (Italy) Fiorentina
- (Italy) Inter Milan
- (Italy) Juventus
- (Italy) Milan
- (Italy) Napoli
- (Italy) Perugia
- (Italy) Roma

European teams

- (England) Ipswich Town
- (Czechoslovakia) Dukla Praha
- (Socialist Federal Republic of Yugoslavia) Hajduk Split
- (Socialist Federal Republic of Yugoslavia) Rijeka
- (Netherlands) Feyenoord

American teams

- Mexico City

== Group stage ==
=== Group A ===
Team	Pts	Pld	W	D	L	GF	GA	GD
(Italy) Napoli	5	3	2	1	0	3	0	+3
(Italy) Roma	4	3	1	2	0	4	3	+1
(Italy) Perugia	2	3	0	2	1	4	6	-2
(Netherlands) Feyenoord	1	3	0	1	2	2	3	-2

=== Group B ===
Team	Pts	Pld	W	D	L	GF	GA	GD
(Italy) Avellino	5	3	2	1	0	5	0	+5
(Italy) Fiorentina	5	3	2	1	0	4	1	+3
(Italy) Milan	2	3	1	0	2	1	3	-2
(Socialist Federal Republic of Yugoslavia) Rijeka	0	3	0	0	3	0	7	-7

=== Group C ===
Team	Pts	Pld	W	D	L	GF	GA	GD
(Czechoslovakia) Dukla Praha	4	3	1	2	0	5	4	+1
(Italy) Catanzaro	3	3	1	1	1	4	3	+1
(Socialist Federal Republic of Yugoslavia) Hajduk Split	3	3	1	1	1	3	3	0
(Italy) Inter	2	3	0	2	1	2	4	-2

=== Group D ===
Team	Pts	Pld	W	D	L	GF	GA	GD
(England) Ipswich Town	5	3	2	1	0	5	1	+4
(Italy) Juventus	5	3	2	1	0	3	1	+2
(Italy) Ascoli	2	3	1	0	2	1	4	-3
Mexico City	0	3	0	0	3	0	3	-3

== Knockout stage ==
Quarter-finals
(Italy) Catanzaro	1
(England) Ipswich Town(pen)	1
(Czechoslovakia) Dukla Praha	1
(Italy) Juventus	0
(Italy) Avellino(pen)	0
(Italy) Roma	0
(Italy) Fiorentina(pen)	1
(Italy) Napoli	1

Semi-finals
(England) Ipswich Town	1
(Czechoslovakia) Dukla Praha	0
(Italy) Avellino	0
(Italy) Fiorentina(pen)	0

Final
(England) Ipswich Town	0
(Italy) Fiorentina	1
Third place
(Czechoslovakia) Dukla Praha	1
(Italy) Avellino	0

== Champions ==
Torneo di Viareggio 1982 Champions

Fiorentina
6th time
