= 1957 Torneo di Viareggio =

1957 Torneo Mondiale di Calcio Coppa Carnevale
9° Torneo di Viareggio

Tournament details
- Host country: Italy
- City: Viareggio
- Teams: 8

Final positions
- Champions: (Italy) Milan
- Runners-up: (Italy) Roma
- Third place: (Italy) Udinese
- Fourth place: (Italy) U.C. Sampdoria

Tournament statistics
- Matches played: 12
- Goals scored: 35 (2.92 per match)

The 1957 winners of the Torneo di Viareggio (in English, the Viareggio Tournament, officially the Viareggio Cup World Football Tournament Coppa Carnevale), the annual youth football tournament held in Viareggio, Tuscany, are listed below.

== Format ==
The 8 teams are organized in knockout rounds. The round of 8 are played in two-legs, while the rest of the rounds are single tie.

== Participating teams ==
Italian teams

- (Italy) Fiorentina
- (Italy) Lanerossi Vicenza
- (Italy) Milan
- (Italy) Roma
- (Italy) Udinese
- (Italy) Sampdoria

European teams

- (Socialist Federal Republic of Yugoslavia) Partizan Beograd
- (Czechoslovakia) Dukla Praha

== Tournament fixtures ==
Quarterfinals
(Socialist Federal Republic of Yugoslavia) Partizan Beograd	1	0	1
(Italy) Sampdoria	1	1	2
(Italy) Lanerossi Vicenza	0	3	3
(Italy) Roma	2	2	4
(Italy) Fiorentina	1	2	3
(Italy) Milan	3	3	6
(Czechoslovakia) Dukla Praha	0	1	1
(Italy) Udinese	1	1	2

Semifinals
(Italy) Sampdoria	0
(Italy) Roma	1
(Italy) Milan	1
(Italy) Udinese	1

Finals
(Italy) Roma	1
(Italy) Milan	4
Third place
(Italy) Sampdoria	2
(Italy) Udinese	3

== Champions ==
Torneo di Viareggio 1957 champions
Milan
4th title
