= 1955 Torneo di Viareggio =

1955 Torneo Mondiale di Calcio Coppa Carnevale
7° Torneo di Viareggio

Tournament details
- Host country: Italy
- City: Viareggio
- Teams: 16

Final positions
- Champions: (Italy) Lanerossi Vicenza
- Runners-up: (Italy) Sampdoria
- Third place: (Italy) Atalanta
- Fourth place: (Italy) Fiorentina

Tournament statistics
- Matches played: 16
- Goals scored: 53 (3.31 per match)

The 1955 winners of the Torneo di Viareggio (in English, the Viareggio Tournament, officially the Viareggio Cup World Football Tournament Coppa Carnevale), the annual youth football tournament held in Viareggio, Tuscany, are listed below.

== Format ==
The 16 teams are organized in knockout rounds, all played single tie.

== Participating teams ==
Italian teams

- (Italy) Atalanta
- (Italy) Bologna
- (Italy) Fiorentina
- (Italy) Genoa
- (Italy) Lanerossi Vicenza
- (Italy) Milan
- (Italy) Sampdoria
- (Italy) Triestina
- (Italy) Udinese
- (Italy) Viareggio

European teams

- (West Germany) Bayern München
- (Socialist Federal Republic of Yugoslavia) Partizan B.
- (Socialist Federal Republic of Yugoslavia) Hajduk Split
- (Austria) First Vienna
- Austria Wien
- (Switzerland) Chiasso

== Tournament fixtures ==
Round of 16
(West Germany) Bayern München	0
(Italy) L.R. Vicenza	1
(Italy) Genoa	1
(Italy) Triestina	0
(Italy) Atalanta	3
(Austria) First Vienna	0
(Socialist Federal Republic of Yugoslavia) Partizan B. (aet)	2
(Italy) Udinese	1
(Socialist Federal Republic of Yugoslavia) Hajduk Split	0
(Italy) Sampdoria	3
Austria Wien	1
(Italy) Bologna	10
(Italy) Fiorentina	1
(Italy) Viareggio	0
(Switzerland) Chiasso	0
(Italy) Milan	8

Quarter-finals
(Italy) L.R. Vicenza	3
(Italy) Genoa	0
(Italy) Atalanta	3
(Socialist Federal Republic of Yugoslavia) Partizan Beograd	1
(Italy) Sampdoria	4
(Italy) Bologna	1
(Italy) Fiorentina	3
(Italy) Milan	0

Semi-finals
(Italy) L.R. Vicenza	2
(Italy) Atalanta	0
(Italy) Sampdoria	0
(Italy) Fiorentina	0

Final
(Italy) L.R. Vicenza	2
(Italy) Sampdoria	0
Third place
(Italy) Atalanta	2
(Italy) Fiorentina	1

== Champions ==
Torneo di Viareggio 1955 Champions

L.R. Vicenza
2nd time
