= 1986 Torneo di Viareggio =

1986 Torneo Mondiale di Calcio Coppa Carnevale
38° Torneo di Viareggio

Tournament details
- Host country: Italy
- City: Viareggio
- Teams: 16

Final positions
- Champions: (Italy) Inter Milan
- Runners-up: (Italy) Sampdoria
- Third place: (Italy) Milan
- Fourth place: (Italy) Fiorentina

Tournament statistics
- Matches played: 30
- Goals scored: 79 (2.63 per match)

The 1986 winners of the Torneo di Viareggio (in English, the Viareggio Tournament, officially the Viareggio Cup World Football Tournament Coppa Carnevale), the annual youth football tournament held in Viareggio, Tuscany, are listed below.

== Format ==
The 16 teams are seeded in 4 groups. Each team from a group meets the others in a single tie. The winner of each group progress to the final knockout stage.

== Participating teams ==
Italian teams

- (Italy) Fiorentina
- (Italy) Genoa
- (Italy) Inter Milan
- (Italy) Milan
- (Italy) Napoli
- (Italy) Roma
- (Italy) Sampdoria
- (Italy) Torino

European teams

- (Czechoslovakia) Dukla Prague
- (West Germany) Bayern Munich
- (Scotland) Aberdeen
- (Hungary) Ferencváros

American teams

- (Argentina) Platense
- (Uruguay) Nacional
- (United States) Ocean Syde

African teams

- (Kenya) Nairobi

== Group stage ==
=== Group A ===
Team	Pts	Pld	W	D	L	GF	GA	GD
(Italy) Sampdoria	4	3	1	2	0	4	3	+1
(Italy) Torino	4	3	1	2	0	4	3	+1
(Czechoslovakia) Dukla Praha	3	3	1	1	1	9	3	+6
(Argentina) Platense	1	3	0	1	2	2	10	-8

=== Group B ===
Team	Pts	Pld	W	D	L	GF	GA	GD
(Italy) Milan	5	3	2	1	0	5	0	+5
(Italy) Genoa	4	3	2	0	1	5	5	0
(Scotland) Aberdeen	2	3	1	0	2	3	4	-1
(Hungary) Ferencváros	1	3	0	1	2	1	5	-4

=== Group C ===
Team	Pts	Pld	W	D	L	GF	GA	GD
(Italy) Roma	4	3	2	0	1	10	2	+8
(Italy) Fiorentina	4	3	2	0	1	4	2	+2
(Germany) Bayern München	4	3	2	0	1	4	6	-2
(United States) Ocean Syde	0	3	0	0	3	1	9	-8

=== Group D ===
Team	Pts	Pld	W	D	L	GF	GA	GD
(Italy) Napoli	4	3	1	2	0	5	1	+4
(Italy) Inter	3	3	1	1	1	5	2	+3
(Uruguay) Nacional	3	3	1	1	1	3	5	-2
(Kenya) Nairobi	2	3	1	0	2	2	7	-5

== Knockout stage ==
Quarter-finals
(Italy) Sampdoria	1
(Italy) Genoa	0
(Italy) Milan(pen)	0 [?]
(Italy) Torino	0 [?]
(Italy) Roma	0
(Italy) Inter	2
(Italy) Napoli	0 [?]
(Italy) Fiorentina(pen)	0 [?]

Semi-finals
(Italy) Sampdoria(pen)	0 [?]
(Italy) Milan	0 [?]
(Italy) Inter	1
(Italy) Fiorentina	0

Final
(Italy) Sampdoria	0
(Italy) Inter	1
Third place
(Italy) Milan	2
(Italy) Fiorentina	1

== Champions ==
Torneo di Viareggio 1986 Champions

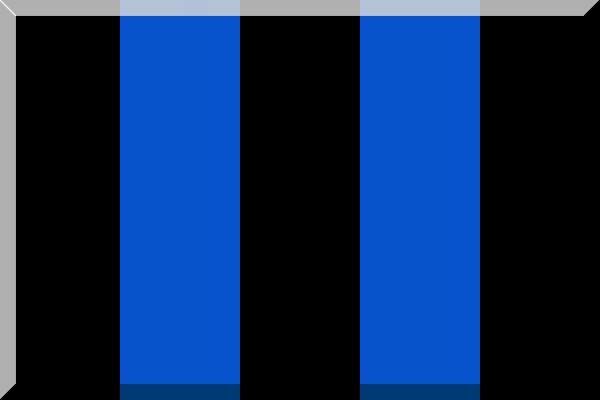

Inter Milan
3rd time
