= 1953 Torneo di Viareggio =

1953 Torneo Mondiale di Calcio Coppa Carnevale
5° Torneo di Viareggio

Tournament details
- Host country: Italy
- City: Viareggio
- Teams: 16

Final positions
- Champions: (Italy) Milan
- Runners-up: (Italy) Juventus
- Third place: (Italy) Udinese
- Fourth place: (Socialist Federal Republic of Yugoslavia) Partizan Beograd

Tournament statistics
- Matches played: 16
- Goals scored: 51 (3.19 per match)

The 1953 winners of the Torneo di Viareggio (in English, the Viareggio Tournament, officially the Viareggio Cup World Football Tournament Coppa Carnevale), the annual youth football tournament held in Viareggio, Tuscany, are listed below.

== Format ==
The 16 teams are organized in knockout rounds, all played single tie.

== Participating teams ==
Italian teams

- (Italy) Atalanta
- (Italy) Bologna
- (Italy) Fiorentina
- (Italy) Juventus
- (Italy) Lazio
- (Italy) Milan
- (Italy) Sampdoria
- (Italy) Udinese
- (Italy) Viareggio

European teams

- Austria Wien
- (West Germany) Offenbach
- (West Germany) Hamburg
- (France) Stade de Reims
- (France) Bordeaux
- (Socialist Federal Republic of Yugoslavia) Hajduk Split
- (Socialist Federal Republic of Yugoslavia) Partizan Beograd

== Tournament fixtures ==
Round of 16
(Socialist Federal Republic of Yugoslavia) Hajduk Split | 0
(Italy) Udinese | 1
(Italy) Atalanta | 4
(West Germany) Offenbach | 2
(Italy) Milan | 2
(France) Bordeaux | 0
Austria Wien | 0
(Italy) Sampdoria | 3
(Italy) Bologna | 1
(Socialist Federal Republic of Yugoslavia) Partizan Beograd | 4
(Italy) Lazio | 2
(Italy) Viareggio | 3
(West Germany) Hamburg | 0
(Italy) Juventus | 4
(Italy) Fiorentina | 5
(France) Stade de Reims | 1

Quarter-finals
(Italy) Udinese | 1
(Italy) Atalanta | 0
(Italy) Milan | 2
(Italy) Sampdoria | 1
(Socialist Federal Republic of Yugoslavia) Partizan B. (aet) | 1
(Italy) Viareggio | 1
(Italy) Juventus | 2
(Italy) Fiorentina | 0

Semi-finals
(Italy) Udinese | 1
(Italy) Milan | 2
(Socialist Federal Republic of Yugoslavia) Partizan Beograd | 0
(Italy) Juventus | 2

Final
(Italy) Milan | 1
(Italy) Juventus | 0
Third place
(Italy) Udinese (aet) | 3
(Socialist Federal Republic of Yugoslavia) Partizan Beograd | 2

== Champions ==
Torneo di Viareggio 1953 Champions

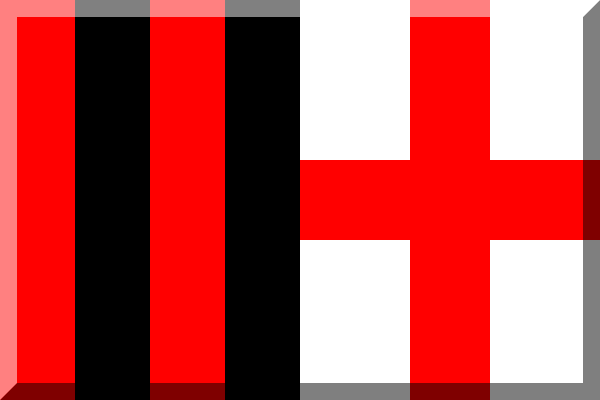

Milan
3rd time
