= 1968 Torneo di Viareggio =

1968 Torneo Mondiale di Calcio Coppa Carnevale
20° Torneo di Viareggio

Tournament details
- Host country: Italy
- City: Viareggio
- Teams: 16

Final positions
- Champions: (Czechoslovakia) Dukla Praha
- Runners-up: (Italy) Juventus
- Third place: (Italy) Napoli
- Fourth place: (Socialist Federal Republic of Yugoslavia) Vojvodina

Tournament statistics
- Matches played: 24
- Goals scored: 45 (1.88 per match)

The 1968 winners of the Torneo di Viareggio (in English, the Viareggio Tournament, officially the Viareggio Cup World Football Tournament Coppa Carnevale), the annual youth football tournament held in Viareggio, Tuscany, are listed below.

== Format ==
The 16 teams are organized in knockout rounds. The round of 16 are played in two-legs, while the rest of the rounds are single tie.

== Participating teams ==
Italian teams

- (Italy) Bologna
- (Italy) Fiorentina
- (Italy) Inter Milan
- (Italy) Juventus
- (Italy) Milan
- (Italy) Napoli
- (Italy) Roma
- (Italy) Sampdoria

European teams

- (West Germany) Eintracht Frankfurt
- (Czechoslovakia) Dukla Praha
- (Socialist Federal Republic of Yugoslavia) Partizan Beograd
- (Socialist Federal Republic of Yugoslavia) Vojvodina
- (Romania) Steaua București
- (Portugal) Benfica
- (Soviet Union) Burevestnik
- (France) Stade de Reims

== Tournament fixtures ==
First round
(Italy) Juventus(pen)	2	0	2 [3]
(Socialist Federal Republic of Yugoslavia) Partizan Beograd	2	0	2 [0]
(Soviet Union) Burevestnik(pen)	0	0	0 [5]
(Italy) Roma	0	0	0 [2]
(Italy) Milan	1	2	3 [3]
(Socialist Federal Republic of Yugoslavia) Vojvodina(pen)	3	0	3 [1]
(Italy) Bologna	2	1	3 [4]
(West Germany) Eintracht F.(pen)	1	2	3 [6]
(Czechoslovakia) Dukla Praha	1	2	3
(Italy) Sampdoria	0	0	0
(Italy) Fiorentina	2	0	2
(Romania) Steaua București	0	0	0
(Portugal) Benfica	0	1	1
(Italy) Napoli	2	2	4
(Italy) Inter	1	1	2
(France) Stade de Reims	0	0	0

Quarter-finals
(Italy) Juventus	3
(Soviet Union) Burevestnik	0
(Socialist Federal Republic of Yugoslavia) Vojvodina	2
(West Germany) Eintracht Frankfurt	0
(Czechoslovakia) Dukla Praha(pen)	0 [6]
(Italy) Fiorentina	0 [3]
(Italy) Napoli(aet)	1
(Italy) Inter	0

Semi-finals
(Italy) Juventus	2
(Socialist Federal Republic of Yugoslavia) Vojvodina	0
(Czechoslovakia) Dukla Praha	2
(Italy) Napoli	0

Final
(Italy) Juventus	1
(Czechoslovakia) Dukla Praha	2
Third place
(Socialist Federal Republic of Yugoslavia) Vojvodina	1 [6]
(Italy) Napoli(pen)	1 [7]

== Champions ==
Torneo di Viareggio 1968 champions

2nd title
