= Torneo di Viareggio =

Viareggio Cup World Football Tournament Coppa Carnevale
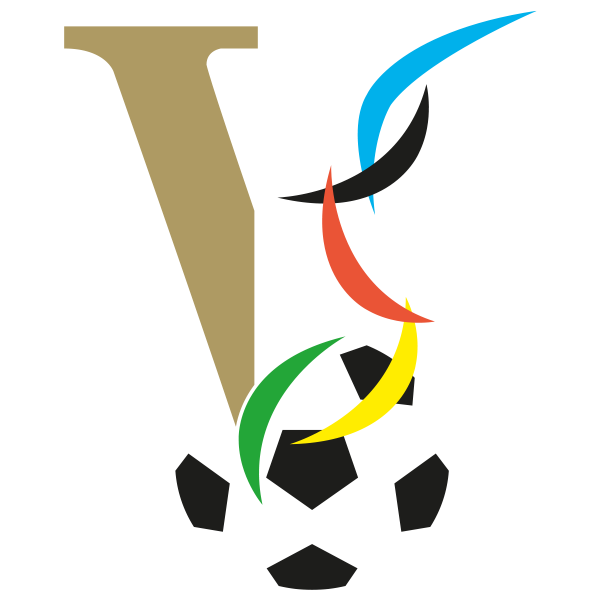
- Organiser(s): C.G.C. Viareggio
- Founded: 1949
- Region: Italy
- Teams: 24
- Current champions: (Italy) Fiorentina
- Most championships: (Italy) Fiorentina, AC Milan, Juventus (9 titles each)
- Broadcaster: RAI
- Website: Official website (Italian)

The Torneo di Viareggio (English: Viareggio Tournament), officially named the Viareggio Cup World Football Tournament Coppa Carnevale, is a youth association football tournament held annually in the commune of Viareggio, Italy and its surrounding areas. Established in 1949, the Torneo di Viareggio is considered one of the most important youth football tournaments in the world.

It coincides with the Carnival of Viareggio, starting on the third Monday of Carneval. The tournament runs for a fortnight, and finishes on the last Monday of Carnival. For this reason, it is also known as Coppa Carnevale (English: Carnival Cup).

== Winners ==
=== By year ===
Year	Winner	Runner-up
1949	(Italy) AC Milan	(Italy) Lazio
1950	(Italy) Sampdoria	(Italy) A.S. Roma
1951	(Socialist Federal Republic of Yugoslavia) Partizan Belgrade	(Italy) Sampdoria
1952	(Italy) AC Milan	(Socialist Federal Republic of Yugoslavia) Partizan Belgrade
1953	(Italy) AC Milan	(Italy) Juventus
1954	(Italy) Lanerossi Vicenza	(Italy) Juventus
1955	(Italy) Lanerossi Vicenza	(Italy) Sampdoria
1956	(Czechoslovakia) Spartak Prague	(Italy) AC Milan
1957	(Italy) AC Milan	(Italy) A.S. Roma
1958	(Italy) Sampdoria	(Italy) Fiorentina
1959	(Italy) AC Milan	(Socialist Federal Republic of Yugoslavia) Partizan Belgrade
1960	(Italy) AC Milan	(Czechoslovakia) Dukla Prague
1961	(Italy) Juventus	(Italy) Lanerossi Vicenza
1962	(Italy) Inter Milan	(Italy) Fiorentina
1963	(Italy) Sampdoria	(Italy) Bologna
1964	(Czechoslovakia) Dukla Prague	(Italy) Bologna
1965	(Italy) Genoa	(Italy) Juventus
1966	(Italy) Fiorentina	(Czechoslovakia) Dukla Prague
1967	(Italy) Bologna	(Italy) Fiorentina
1968	(Czechoslovakia) Dukla Prague	(Italy) Juventus
1969	(Italy) Atalanta	(Italy) Napoli
1970	(Czechoslovakia) Dukla Prague	(Italy) AC Milan
1971	(Italy) Inter Milan	(Italy) AC Milan
1972	(Czechoslovakia) Dukla Prague	(Italy) Inter Milan
1973	(Italy) Fiorentina	(Italy) Bologna
1974	(Italy) Fiorentina	(Italy) Lazio
1975	(Italy) Napoli	(Italy) Lazio
1976	(Czechoslovakia) Dukla Prague	(Italy) AC Milan
1977	(Italy) Sampdoria	(Italy) AC Milan
1978	(Italy) Fiorentina	(Italy) A.S. Roma
1979	(Italy) Fiorentina	(Italy) Perugia
1980	(Czechoslovakia) Dukla Prague	(Italy) Lazio
1981	(Italy) A.S. Roma	(England) Ipswich Town
1982	(Italy) Fiorentina	(England) Ipswich Town
1983	(Italy) A.S. Roma	(Italy) Inter Milan
1984	(Italy) Torino	(Italy) Napoli
1985	(Italy) Torino	(Italy) A.S. Roma
1986	(Italy) Inter Milan	(Italy) Sampdoria
1987	(Italy) Torino	(Italy) Fiorentina
1988	(Italy) Fiorentina	(Italy) Torino
1989	(Italy) Torino	(Italy) A.S. Roma
1990	(Italy) Cesena	(Italy) Napoli
1991	(Italy) A.S. Roma	(Italy) Napoli
1992	(Italy) Fiorentina	(Italy) A.S. Roma
1993	(Italy) Atalanta	(Italy) AC Milan
1994	(Italy) Juventus	(Italy) Fiorentina
1995	(Italy) Torino	(Italy) Fiorentina
1996	(Italy) Brescia	(Italy) Parma
1997	(Italy) Bari	(Italy) Torino
1998	(Italy) Torino	(Brazil) Irineu
1999	(Italy) AC Milan	(Croatia) Varteks
2000	(Italy) Empoli	(Italy) Fiorentina
2001	(Italy) AC Milan	(Brazil) Vitória
2002	(Italy) Inter Milan	(Italy) Torino
2003	(Italy) Juventus	(Czech Republic) Slavia Prague
2004	(Italy) Juventus	(Italy) Empoli
2005	(Italy) Juventus	(Italy) Genoa
2006	(Uruguay) Juventud	(Italy) Juventus
2007	(Italy) Genoa	(Italy) A.S. Roma
2008	(Italy) Inter Milan	(Italy) Empoli
2009	(Italy) Juventus	(Italy) Sampdoria
2010	(Italy) Juventus	(Italy) Empoli
2011	(Italy) Inter Milan	(Italy) Fiorentina
2012	(Italy) Juventus	(Italy) A.S. Roma
2013	(Belgium) Anderlecht	(Italy) AC Milan
2014	(Italy) AC Milan	(Belgium) Anderlecht
2015	(Italy) Inter Milan	(Italy) Hellas Verona
2016	(Italy) Juventus	(Italy) Palermo
2017	(Italy) Sassuolo	(Italy) Empoli
2018	(Italy) Inter Milan	(Italy) Fiorentina
2019	(Italy) Bologna	(Italy) Genoa
2022	(Italy) Sassuolo	(Nigeria) Alex Transfiguration
2023	(Italy) Sassuolo	(Italy) Torino
2024	(Nigeria) Beyond Limits F.A.	(Republic of the Congo) Brazzaville
2025	(Italy) Genoa	(Italy) Fiorentina
2026	(Italy) Fiorentina	(Croatia) HNK Rijeka

=== By club ===
Club	Winners	Runners-up	Winning years
(Italy) Fiorentina	9	10	1966, 1973, 1974, 1978, 1979, 1982, 1988, 1992, 2026
(Italy) AC Milan	9	7	1949, 1952, 1953, 1957, 1959, 1960, 1999, 2001, 2014
(Italy) Juventus	9	5	1961, 1994, 2003, 2004, 2005, 2009, 2010, 2012, 2016
(Italy) Inter Milan	8	2	1962, 1971, 1986, 2002, 2008, 2011, 2015, 2018
(Italy) Torino	6	4	1984, 1985, 1987, 1989, 1995, 1998
(Czechoslovakia) Dukla Prague	6	2	1964, 1968, 1970, 1972, 1976, 1980
(Italy) Sampdoria	4	4	1950, 1958, 1963, 1977
(Italy) AS Roma	3	8	1981, 1983, 1991
(Italy) Genoa	3	2	1965, 2007, 2025
(Italy) Sassuolo	3	–	2017, 2022, 2023
(Italy) Bologna	2	3	1967, 2019
(Italy) Vicenza	2	1	1954, 1955
(Italy) Atalanta	2	–	1969, 1993
(Italy) Napoli	1	4	1975
(Italy) Empoli	1	4	2000
(Socialist Federal Republic of Yugoslavia) Partizan Belgrade	1	2	1951
(Belgium) Anderlecht	1	1	2013
(Italy) Bari	1	–	1997
(Italy) Brescia	1	–	1996
(Italy) Cesena	1	–	1990
(Uruguay) Juventud	1	–	2006
(Czechoslovakia) Sparta Prague	1	–	1956
(Nigeria) Beyond Limits F.A.	1	–	2024
(Italy) Lazio	–	4	–
(England) Ipswich Town	–	2	–
(Nigeria) Alex Transfiguration	–	1	–
(Brazil) Irineu	–	1	–
(Italy) Parma	–	1	–
(Italy) Perugia	–	1	–
(Czechoslovakia) Slavia Prague	–	1	–
(Croatia) Varteks	–	1	–
(Brazil) Vitória	–	1	–
(Italy) Hellas Verona	–	1	–
(Italy) Palermo	–	1	–
(Croatia) HNK Rijeka	–	1	–

== Golden Boy Award ==
Since 2009, the Torneo di Viareggio Golden Boy award is given to the best talent in the tournament (including goalkeepers). The player who collects the most votes by a jury composed of sports journalists accompanying the event is the winner.

The jury will be composed of:

- Writers from Tuttosport, Gazzetta dello Sport and Corriere dello Sport.
- Editors from Il Tirreno and La Nazione.
- Journalists from RAI.
- Communications and printing directors from CGC.

=== Winners ===
Year	Player	Country	Club
2009	Guido Marilungo	Italy	(Italy) Sampdoria
2010	Ciro Immobile	Italy	(Italy) Juventus
2011	Simone Dell'Agnello	Italy	(Italy) Inter Milan
2012	Leonardo Spinazzola	Italy	(Italy) Juventus
2013	Bryan Cristante	Italy	(Italy) AC Milan
2014	Alberto Cerri	Italy	(Italy) Parma
2015	Federico Bonazzoli	Italy	(Italy) Inter Milan
2016	Antonino La Gumina	Italy	(Italy) Palermo
2017	Carlo Manicone	Italy	(Italy) Empoli
2018	Gabriele Gori	Italy	(Italy) Fiorentina
2019	Flavio Bianchi	Italy	(Italy) Genoa
2022	Ayomide Ogungbe	Nigeria	(Nigeria) Alex Transfiguration
2023	Alexandru Capac	Romania	(Italy) Torino
2024	Digne Kaelas Pounga	Congo	(Republic of the Congo) Brazzaville
2025	Lorenzo Colonnese	Italy	(Italy) Genoa
2026	Federico Mataran	Argentina	(Italy) Fiorentina

== See also ==
- Maurice Revello Tournament
- Montaigu Tournament
- Granatkin Memorial
- Memorial of Agata Mróz-Olszewska
- Cornacchia World Cup since 1983 - U19 / U17 (Boys / Girls) in Pordenone
- it:Coppa delle Nazioni
- Torneo delle Nazioni
- Montreux Volley Masters
- VTV International Women's Volleyball Cup
- Guystac Trophy
- IIHF Development Cup
- Memorial of Agata Mróz-Olszewska
