= 1971 Torneo di Viareggio =

1971 Torneo Mondiale di Calcio Coppa Carnevale
23° Torneo di Viareggio

Tournament details
- Host country: Italy
- City: Viareggio
- Teams: 16

Final positions
- Champions: (Italy) Inter Milan
- Runners-up: (Italy) Milan
- Third place: (Italy) Juventus
- Fourth place: (Italy) Fiorentina

Tournament statistics
- Matches played: 24
- Goals scored: 48 (2 per match)

The 1971 winners of the Torneo di Viareggio (in English, the Viareggio Tournament, officially the Viareggio Cup World Football Tournament Coppa Carnevale), the annual youth football tournament held in Viareggio, Tuscany, are listed below.

== Format ==
The 16 teams are organized in knockout rounds. The round of 16 are played in two-legs, while the rest of the rounds are single tie.

== Participating teams ==
Italian teams

- (Italy) Cagliari
- (Italy) Fiorentina
- (Italy) Inter Milan
- (Italy) Juventus
- (Italy) Milan
- (Italy) Napoli
- (Italy) Roma
- (Italy) Torino

European teams

- (West Germany) Eintracht Frankfurt
- (Czechoslovakia) Dukla Praha
- (Socialist Federal Republic of Yugoslavia) Partizan Beograd
- (Bulgaria) CSKA Sofia
- (Hungary) Ferencváros
- (Portugal) Benfica
- (Socialist Federal Republic of Yugoslavia) Vojvodina
- (Spain) Valencia

== Tournament fixtures ==
First round
(West Germany) Eintracht Frankfurt	2	1	3
(Italy) Inter	4	2	6
(Portugal) Benfica	0	2	2
(Italy) Cagliari	2	2	4
(Bulgaria) CSKA Sofia	0	0	0
(Italy) Fiorentina	2	0	2
(Hungary) Ferencváros	1	0	1
(Italy) Roma	1	2	3
(Italy) Milan	1	2	3
(Socialist Federal Republic of Yugoslavia) Vojvodina	0	0	0
(Czechoslovakia) Dukla Praha(pen)	0	1	1 [7]
(Italy) Napoli	1	0	1 [6]
(Italy) Juventus	0	2	2
(Spain) Valencia	0	0	0
(Socialist Federal Republic of Yugoslavia) Partizan Beograd	2	1	3
(Italy) Torino	3	1	4

Quarter-finals
(Italy) Inter(pen)	0 [4]
(Italy) Cagliari	0 [3]
(Italy) Fiorentina	2
(Italy) Roma	1
(Italy) Milan	2
(Czechoslovakia) Dukla Praha	1
(Italy) Juventus(pen)	0 [6]
(Italy) Torino	0 [5]

Semi-finals
(Italy) Inter	1
(Italy) Fiorentina	0
(Italy) Milan	3
(Italy) Juventus	0

Final
(Italy) Inter	2
(Italy) Milan	1
Third place
(Italy) Fiorentina	0 [5]
(Italy) Juventus(pen)	0 [3]

== Champions ==
Torneo di Viareggio 1971 champions
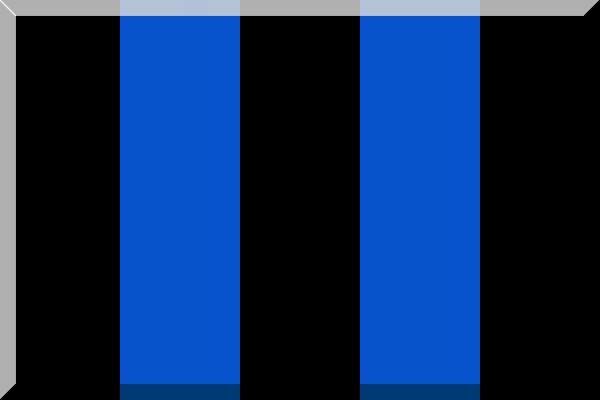
Inter Milan
2nd title
