= 1956 Torneo di Viareggio =

1956 Torneo Mondiale di Calcio Coppa Carnevale
8° Torneo di Viareggio

Tournament details
- Host country: Italy
- City: Viareggio
- Teams: 16

Final positions
- Champions: (Czechoslovakia) Spartak Praha
- Runners-up: (Italy) Milan
- Third place: (Italy) Sampdoria
- Fourth place: (Italy) S.P.A.L.

Tournament statistics
- Matches played: 16
- Goals scored: 57 (3.56 per match)

The 1956 winners of the Torneo di Viareggio (in English, the Viareggio Tournament, officially the Viareggio Cup World Football Tournament Coppa Carnevale), the annual youth football tournament held in Viareggio, Tuscany, are listed below.

== Format ==
The 16 teams are organized in knockout rounds, all played single tie.

== Participating teams ==
Italian teams

- (Italy) Atalanta
- (Italy) Bologna
- (Italy) Fiorentina
- (Italy) Genoa
- (Italy) Lanerossi Vicenza
- (Italy) Lazio
- (Italy) Milan
- (Italy) Modena
- (Italy) Padova
- (Italy) Sampdoria
- (Italy) S.P.A.L.
- (Italy) Udinese

European teams

- (West Germany) Bayern München
- (Spain) Deportivo Madrid
- (Czechoslovakia) Spartak Praha
- (Denmark) Odense

== Tournament fixtures ==
Round of 16
(West Germany) Bayern München	1
(Italy) S.P.A.L.	3
(Italy) Fiorentina	1
(Italy) L.R. Vicenza	2
(Italy) Modena	0
(Italy) Padova	2
(Italy) Atalanta	1
(Czechoslovakia) Spartak Praha	3
(Italy) Lazio	1
(Denmark) Odense	2
(Italy) Genoa	1
(Italy) Milan	2
(Spain) Deportivo Madrid	1
(Italy) Sampdoria	4
(Italy) Bologna	1
(Italy) Udinese	4

Quarter-finals
(Italy) S.P.A.L.	2
(Italy) L.R. Vicenza	1
(Italy) Padova	1
(Czechoslovakia) Spartak Praha	1
(Denmark) Odense	3
(Italy) Milan	0
(Italy) Sampdoria	4
(Italy) Udinese	1

Semi-finals
(Italy) S.P.A.L.	1
(Czechoslovakia) Spartak Praha	2
(Italy) Milan	3
(Italy) Sampdoria	1

Final
(Czechoslovakia) Spartak Praha	2
(Italy) Milan	1
Third place
(Italy) S.P.A.L.	2
(Italy) Sampdoria	3

== Champions ==
Torneo di Viareggio 1956 Champions

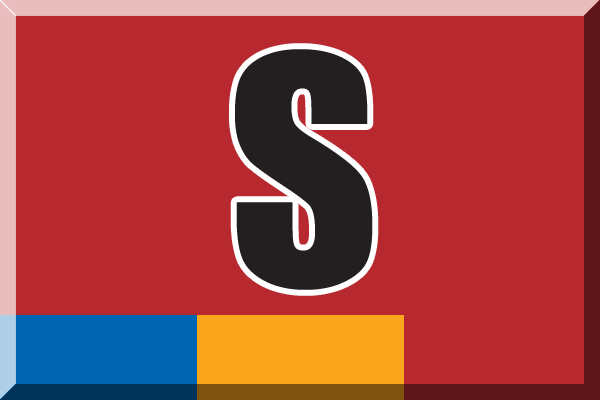

Spartak Praha
1st time
