= 1962 Torneo di Viareggio =

1962 Torneo Mondiale di Calcio Coppa Carnevale
14° Torneo di Viareggio

Tournament details
- Host country: Italy
- City: Viareggio
- Teams: 16

Final positions
- Champions: (Italy) Inter Milan
- Runners-up: (Italy) Fiorentina
- Third place: (Italy) Torino
- Fourth place: (Italy) Milan

Tournament statistics
- Matches played: 24
- Goals scored: 63 (2.63 per match)

The 1962 winners of the Torneo di Viareggio (in English, the Viareggio Tournament, officially the Viareggio Cup World Football Tournament Coppa Carnevale), the annual youth football tournament held in Viareggio, Tuscany, are listed below.

== Format ==
The 16 teams are organized in knockout rounds. The round of 16 are played in two-legs, while the rest of the rounds are single tie.

== Participating teams ==
Italian teams

- (Italy) Bologna
- (Italy) Fiorentina
- (Italy) Inter Milan
- (Italy) Juventus
- (Italy) L.R. Vicenza
- (Italy) Milan
- (Italy) Sampdoria
- (Italy) Torino

European teams

- (Socialist Federal Republic of Yugoslavia) Partizan Beograd
- (Socialist Federal Republic of Yugoslavia) Rijeka
- (Socialist Federal Republic of Yugoslavia) Dinamo Zagreb
- (Czechoslovakia) Dukla Praha
- (Romania) Progresul București
- (Bulgaria) CSKA Sofia
- (Spain) Barcelona
- (Hungary) Budapest

== Tournament fixtures ==
First round
(Italy) Milan	2	0	2
(Socialist Federal Republic of Yugoslavia) Rijeka	0	1	1
(Spain) Barcelona	2	1	3
(Italy) Bologna	1	3	4
(Bulgaria) CDNA Sofia	1	1	2
(Italy) Juventus	1	2	3
(Socialist Federal Republic of Yugoslavia) Dinamo Zagreb	2	2	4
(Italy) Fiorentina	3	3	6
(Italy) Inter	2	3	5
(Romania) Progresul București	1	3	4
(Hungary) Budapest	1	0	1
(Italy) L.R. Vicenza	0	1	1
(Socialist Federal Republic of Yugoslavia) Partizan Beograd	0	1	1
(Italy) Torino	1	1	2
(Czechoslovakia) Dukla Praha	1	1	2
(Italy) Sampdoria	1	3	4

Quarter-finals
(Italy) Milan	1
(Italy) Bologna	1
(Italy) Juventus	0
(Italy) Fiorentina	2
(Italy) Inter	2
(Italy) Lanerossi Vicenza	0
(Italy) Torino(aet)	3
(Italy) Sampdoria	1

Semi-finals
(Italy) Milan	1 [4]
(Italy) Fiorentina(pen)	1 [5]
(Italy) Inter	2
(Italy) Torino	0

Final
(Italy) Fiorentina	1
(Italy) Inter	2
Third place
(Italy) Milan	0
(Italy) Torino	2

== Champions ==
Torneo di Viareggio 1962 champions
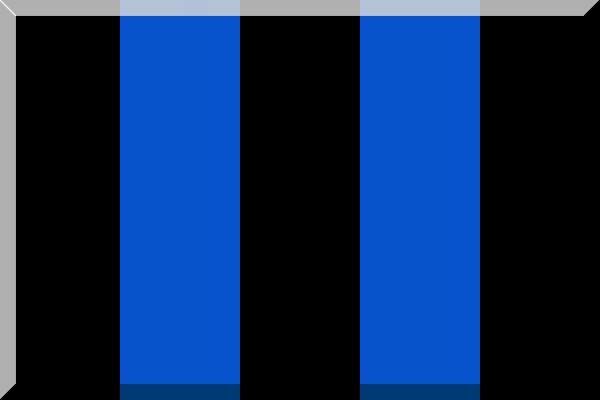
Inter Milan
1st title
