= 1959 Torneo di Viareggio =

1959 Torneo Mondiale di Calcio Coppa Carnevale
11° Torneo di Viareggio

Tournament details
- Host country: Italy
- City: Viareggio
- Teams: 8

Final positions
- Champions: (Italy) Milan
- Runners-up: (Socialist Federal Republic of Yugoslavia) Partizan Beograd
- Third place: (Italy) Fiorentina
- Fourth place: (Italy) Roma

Tournament statistics
- Matches played: 12
- Goals scored: 38 (3.17 per match)

The 1959 winners of the Torneo di Viareggio (in English, the Viareggio Tournament, officially the Viareggio Cup World Football Tournament Coppa Carnevale), the annual youth football tournament held in Viareggio, Tuscany, are listed below.

== Format ==
The 8 teams are organized in knockout rounds. The round of 8 are played in two-legs, while the rest of the rounds are single tie.

== Participating teams ==
Italian teams

- (Italy) Fiorentina
- (Italy) Juventus
- (Italy) Milan
- (Italy) Roma
- (Italy) Sampdoria

European teams

- (Socialist Federal Republic of Yugoslavia) Partizan Beograd
- (France) Racing Paris
- (Austria) Rapid Wien

== Tournament fixtures ==
Quarterfinals
(Italy) Milan	2	2	4
(France) Racing Paris	1	1	2
(Italy) Fiorentina	2	3	5
(Austria) Rapid Wien	1	1	2
(Socialist Federal Republic of Yugoslavia) Partizan Beograd	2	3	5
(Italy) Sampdoria	1	0	1
(Italy) Juventus	0	0	0
(Italy) Roma	0	2	2

Semifinals
(Italy) Milan	1
(Italy) Fiorentina	0
(Socialist Federal Republic of Yugoslavia) Partizan Beograd	4
(Italy) Roma	1

Finals
(Italy) Milan	2
(Socialist Federal Republic of Yugoslavia) Partizan Beograd	1
Third place
(Italy) Fiorentina	8
(Italy) Roma	0

== Champions ==
Torneo di Viareggio 1959 champions
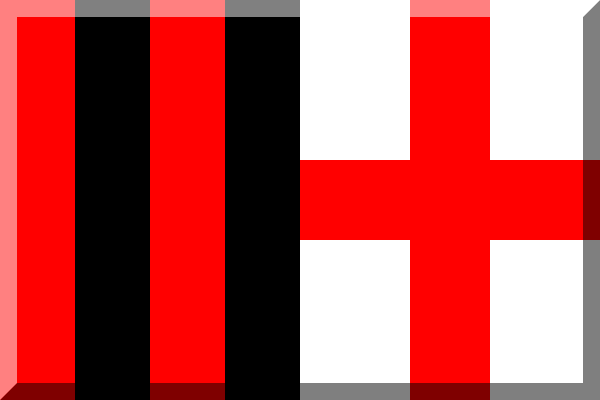
Milan
5th title
