= 1979 Torneo di Viareggio =

1979 Torneo Mondiale di Calcio Coppa Carnevale
31° Torneo di Viareggio

Tournament details
- Host country: Italy
- City: Viareggio
- Teams: 16

Final positions
- Champions: (Italy) Fiorentina
- Runners-up: (Italy) Perugia
- Third place: (Italy) Pistoiese
- Fourth place: (Italy) Juventus

Tournament statistics
- Matches played: 30
- Goals scored: 78 (2.6 per match)

The 1979 winners of the Torneo di Viareggio (in English, the Viareggio Tournament, officially the Viareggio Cup World Football Tournament Coppa Carnevale), the annual youth football tournament held in Viareggio, Tuscany, are listed below.

== Format ==
The 16 teams are seeded in 4 groups. Each team from a group meets the others in a single tie. The winner of each group progress to the final knockout stage.

== Participating teams ==
Italian teams

- (Italy) Fiorentina
- (Italy) Inter Milan
- (Italy) Juventus
- (Italy) Lanerossi Vicenza
- (Italy) Milan
- (Italy) Napoli
- (Italy) Perugia
- (Italy) Pistoiese
- (Italy) Roma

European teams

- (Poland) Wisła Kraków
- (Socialist Federal Republic of Yugoslavia) OFK Beograd
- (Spain) Atlético Madrid
- (Scotland) Celtic
- (Socialist Federal Republic of Yugoslavia) Rijeka

American teams

- Mexico City

Asian teams

- (China) Hebei

== Group stage ==
=== Group A ===
Team	Pts	Pld	W	D	L	GF	GA	GD
(Italy) Roma	6	3	3	0	0	6	0	+6
(Italy) Fiorentina	4	3	2	0	1	7	1	+6
Mexico City	2	3	1	0	2	1	4	-3
(Poland) Wisła Kraków	0	3	0	0	3	0	9	-9

=== Group B ===
Team	Pts	Pld	W	D	L	GF	GA	GD
(Italy) Inter	4	3	1	2	0	7	4	+3
(Italy) Pistoiese	3	3	1	1	1	3	3	0
(Socialist Federal Republic of Yugoslavia) OFK Beograd	3	3	1	0	2	2	5	-3
(Italy) Napoli	2	3	1	0	2	5	5	0

=== Group C ===
Team	Pts	Pld	W	D	L	GF	GA	GD
(Spain) Atlético Madrid	4	3	2	0	1	5	2	+3
(Italy) Milan	3	3	1	1	1	3	2	+1
(Italy) Lanerossi Vicenza	3	3	1	1	1	2	3	-1
(Scotland) Celtic	2	3	0	2	1	2	5	-3

=== Group D ===
Team	Pts	Pld	W	D	L	GF	GA	GD
(Italy) Juventus	5	3	2	1	0	7	1	+6
(Italy) Perugia	5	3	2	1	0	5	1	+4
(Socialist Federal Republic of Yugoslavia) Rijeka	2	3	1	0	2	4	6	-2
(China) Hebei	0	3	0	0	3	4	12	-8

== Knockout stage ==
Quarter-finals
(Italy) Fiorentina	1
(Italy) Inter	0
(Italy) Pistoiese(pen)	0
(Italy) Roma	0
(Italy) Juventus(pen)	2
(Italy) Milan	2
(Spain) Atlético Madrid	0
(Italy) Perugia	1

Semi-finals
(Italy) Fiorentina	2
(Italy) Pistoiese	1
(Italy) Juventus	1
(Italy) Perugia(pen)	1

Final
(Italy) Fiorentina	1
(Italy) Perugia	0
Third place
(Italy) Pistoiese	2
(Italy) Juventus	1

== Champions ==
Torneo di Viareggio 1979 Champions

Fiorentina
5th time
