= 1991 Torneo di Viareggio =

1991 Torneo Mondiale di Calcio Coppa Carnevale
43° Torneo di Viareggio

Tournament details
- Host country: Italy
- City: Viareggio
- Teams: 24

Final positions
- Champions: (Italy) Roma
- Runners-up: (Italy) Napoli
- Third place: (Italy) Fiorentina
- Fourth place: (Italy) Milan

Tournament statistics
- Matches played: 38
- Goals scored: 85 (2.24 per match)

The 1991 winners of the Torneo di Viareggio (in English, the Viareggio Tournament, officially the Viareggio Cup World Football Tournament Coppa Carnevale), the annual youth football tournament held in Viareggio, Tuscany, are listed below.

== Format ==
The 24 teams are seeded in 6 knockout groups. The winner of each group and two lucky losers progress to the final knockout stage. The final round matches include 30 minutes extra time and penalties to be played if the draw between teams still holds. The semifinals losing sides play consolation final. The winning teams play the final with extra time and repeat the match if the draw holds.

== Participating teams ==
Italian teams

- (Italy) Atalanta
- (Italy) Bari
- (Italy) Bologna
- (Italy) Cesena
- (Italy) Cremonese
- (Italy) Fiorentina
- (Italy) Inter Milan
- (Italy) Juventus
- (Italy) Lazio
- (Italy) Milan
- (Italy) Napoli
- (Italy) Parma
- (Italy) Pescara
- (Italy) Roma
- (Italy) Torino
- (Italy) Udinese
- (Italy) Viareggio

European teams

- (Switzerland) Zurich
- (England) Aston Villa
- (France) Metz
- (Soviet Union) Dinamo Kiev
- (Soviet Union) Spartak Moscow
- (Hungary) Honved

American teams

- (Canada) Toronto

== Group stage ==
=== Group A ===
Semifinals
(Soviet Union) Spartak Moscow | 1 | 0 | 1
(Italy) Lazio | 1 | 2 | 3
(Italy) Fiorentina | 0 | 0 | 0
(Italy) Udinese | 1 | 0 | 1

Finals
(Italy) Lazio | 0
(Italy) Fiorentina | 1

=== Group B ===
Semifinals
(Italy) Cesena | 2 | 3 | 5
(Italy) Atalanta | 2 | 0 | 2
(Italy) Parma | 1 | 0 | 1
(France) Metz | 0 | 1 | 1

Finals
(Italy) Atalanta | 2
(Italy) Parma | 0

=== Group C ===
Semifinals
(Italy) Juventus | 0 | 1 | 1
(Italy) Bari | 1 | 1 | 2
(Italy) Bologna | 1 | 0 | 1
(England) Aston Villa | 0 | 0 | 0

Finals
(Italy) Bari | 0 (3)
(Italy) Bologna (pen) | 0 (4)

=== Group D ===
Semifinals
(Italy) Napoli | 2 | 1 | 3
(Soviet Union) Dinamo Kiev | 0 | 2 | 2
(Italy) Inter Milan | 2 | 3 | 5
(Italy) Pescara | 0 | 0 | 0

Finals
(Italy) Napoli | 2
(Italy) Inter Milan | 0

=== Group E ===
Semifinals
(Italy) Roma | 4 | 1 | 5
(Hungary) Honved | 3 | 1 | 4
(Italy) Viareggio | 1 | 0 | 1
(Italy) Torino | 4 | 1 | 5

Finals
(Italy) Roma | 1 (4)
(Italy) Torino | 1 (3)

=== Group F ===
Semifinals
(Switzerland) Zurich | 1 | 0 | 1
(Italy) Milan | 2 | 2 | 4
(Italy) Cremonese | 5 | 1 | 6
(Canada) Toronto | 0 | 0 | 0

Finals
(Italy) Milan | 2
(Italy) Cremonese | 1

== Knockout stage ==
Quarter-finals
(Italy) Atalanta | 2 (?)
(Italy) Roma (pen) | 2 (?)
(Italy) Bari | 1 (?)
(Italy) Fiorentina (pen) | 1 (?)
(Italy) Napoli (pen) | 1 (?)
(Italy) Bologna | 1 (?)
(Italy) Torino | 1 (?)
(Italy) Milan (pen) | 1 (?)

Semi-finals
(Italy) Roma | 2
(Italy) Fiorentina | 1
(Italy) Napoli | 1
(Italy) Milan | 0

Final
(Italy) Roma | 3
(Italy) Napoli | 1
Third place
(Italy) Fiorentina (pen) | 1 (?)
(Italy) Milan | 1 (?)

== Champions ==
Torneo di Viareggio 1991 Champions

Roma
3rd time
