= 1960 Torneo di Viareggio =

1960 Torneo Mondiale di Calcio Coppa Carnevale
12° Torneo di Viareggio

Tournament details
- Host country: Italy
- City: Viareggio
- Teams: 16

Final positions
- Champions: (Italy) Milan
- Runners-up: (Czechoslovakia) Dukla Praha
- Third place: (Italy) Fiorentina
- Fourth place: (Italy) Bologna

Tournament statistics
- Matches played: 24
- Goals scored: 61 (2.54 per match)

The 1960 winners of the Torneo di Viareggio (in English, the Viareggio Tournament, officially the Viareggio Cup World Football Tournament Coppa Carnevale), the annual youth football tournament held in Viareggio, Tuscany, are listed below.

== Format ==
The 16 teams are organized in knockout rounds. The round of 16 are played in two-legs, while the rest of the rounds are single tie.

== Participating teams ==
Italian teams

- (Italy) Bologna
- (Italy) Fiorentina
- (Italy) Genoa
- (Italy) Lazio
- (Italy) Milan
- (Italy) Roma
- (Italy) Sampdoria
- (Italy) Torino
- (Italy) Udinese

European teams

- (Socialist Federal Republic of Yugoslavia) Partizan Beograd
- (Socialist Federal Republic of Yugoslavia) Šibenik
- (Czechoslovakia) Dukla Praha
- (West Germany) Bayern München
- (France) Bordeaux
- (Bulgaria) Levski Sofia
- (Hungary) Vasas Budapest

== Tournament fixtures ==
First round
(Czechoslovakia) Dukla Praha | 2 | 0 | 2
(Italy) Lazio | 0 | 0 | 0
(Italy) Sampdoria | 3 | 3
(Socialist Federal Republic of Yugoslavia) Šibenik | 1 | 1
(France) Bordeaux | 0 | 0 | 0
(Italy) Fiorentina | 5 | 5 | 10
(Bulgaria) Levski Sofia | 0 | 1 | 1
(Italy) Udinese | 3 | 0 | 3
(West Germany) Bayern München | 1 | 2 | 3
(Italy) Milan | 8 | 0 | 8
(Italy) Genoa | 0 | 0 | 0
(Socialist Federal Republic of Yugoslavia) Partizan Beograd | 1 | 3 | 4
(Italy) Bologna | 2 | 0 | 2
(Hungary) Vasas Budapest | 1 | 0 | 1
(Italy) Roma | 1 | 0 | 1
(Italy) Torino | 1 | 2 | 3

Quarter-finals
(Czechoslovakia) Dukla Praha | 1
(Italy) Sampdoria | 0
(Italy) Fiorentina | 3
(Italy) Udinese | 0
(Italy) Milan | 1
(Socialist Federal Republic of Yugoslavia) Partizan Beograd | 1
(Italy) Bologna | 1
(Italy) Torino | 0

Semi-finals
(Czechoslovakia) Dukla Praha(pen) | 3 [5]
(Italy) Fiorentina | 3 [3]
(Italy) Milan | 2
(Italy) Bologna | 0

Final
(Czechoslovakia) Dukla Praha | 0
(Italy) Milan | 1
Third place
(Italy) Fiorentina | 2
(Italy) Bologna | 0

== Champions ==
Torneo di Viareggio 1960 champions
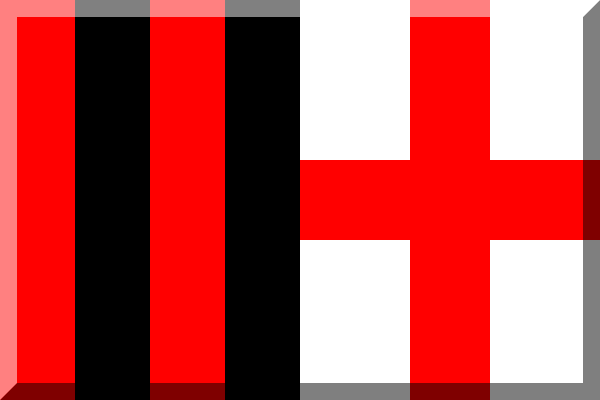
Milan
6th title
