= 1958 Torneo di Viareggio =

1958 Torneo Mondiale di Calcio Coppa Carnevale
10° Torneo di Viareggio

Tournament details
- Host country: Italy
- City: Viareggio
- Teams: 16

Final positions
- Champions: (Italy) Sampdoria
- Runners-up: (Italy) Fiorentina
- Third place: (Italy) Udinese
- Fourth place: (Italy) Lanerossi Vicenza

Tournament statistics
- Matches played: 23
- Goals scored: 65 (2.83 per match)

The 1958 winners of the Torneo di Viareggio (in English, the Viareggio Tournament, officially the Viareggio Cup World Football Tournament Coppa Carnevale), the annual youth football tournament held in Viareggio, Tuscany, are listed below.

== Format ==
The 16 teams are organized in knockout rounds. The round of 16 are played in two-legs, while the rest of the rounds are single tie.

== Participating teams ==
Italian teams

- (Italy) Alessandria
- (Italy) Atalanta
- (Italy) Fiorentina
- (Italy) Genoa
- (Italy) Lanerossi Vicenza
- (Italy) Milan
- (Italy) Roma
- (Italy) Sampdoria
- (Italy) Udinese
- (Italy) Zenit Modena

European teams

- (Socialist Federal Republic of Yugoslavia) Partizan Beograd
- (Socialist Federal Republic of Yugoslavia) Hajduk Split
- (France) Racing Paris
- (Spain) Deportivo Barcelona
- (Romania) Progresul București
- (Czechoslovakia) Spartak Praha

== Tournament fixtures ==
First round
(Spain) Deportivo Barcelona	0	3	3
(Italy) Sampdoria	3	2	5
(Italy) Genoa	3	0	3
(Italy) Milan	0	1	1
(Italy) Alessandria	3	3
(Socialist Federal Republic of Yugoslavia) Partizan Beograd	1	1
(France) Racing Paris	3	5	8
(Italy) Udinese	2	1	3
(Socialist Federal Republic of Yugoslavia) Hajduk Split	0	0	0
(Italy) Roma	1	1	2
(Italy) Fiorentina	3	5	8
(Romania) Progresul București	2	1	3
(Italy) Atalanta	0	1	1
(Italy) Lanerossi Vicenza	1	0	1
(Czechoslovakia) Spartak Praha	2	0	2
(Italy) Zenit Modena	1	1	2

Quarter-finals
(Italy) Sampdoria	2
(Italy) Genoa	1
(Italy) Alessandria	0
(Italy) Udinese	1
(Italy) Roma	0
(Italy) Fiorentina	4
(Italy) Atalanta	1
(Italy) Zenit Modena	0

Semi-finals
(Italy) Sampdoria	2
(Italy) Udinese	1
(Italy) Fiorentina	4
(Italy) Atalanta	1

Final
(Italy) Sampdoria	2
(Italy) Fiorentina	0
Third place
(Italy) Udinese	2
(Italy) Atalanta	0

== Champions ==
Torneo di Viareggio 1958 champions
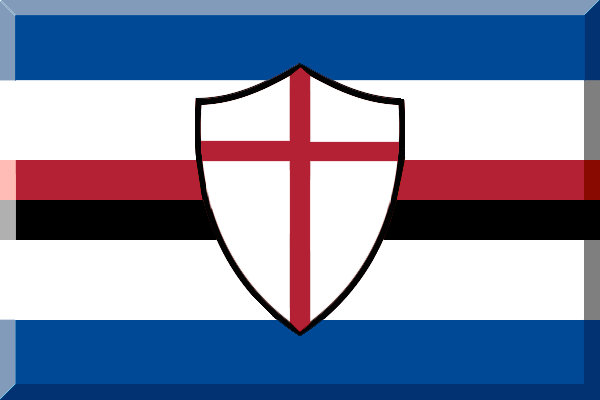
Sampdoria
2nd title
