= 1980 Torneo di Viareggio =

1980 Torneo Mondiale di Calcio Coppa Carnevale
32° Torneo di Viareggio

Tournament details
- Host country: Italy
- City: Viareggio
- Teams: 16

Final positions
- Champions: (Czechoslovakia) Dukla Praha
- Runners-up: (Italy) Lazio
- Third place: (Italy) Napoli
- Fourth place: (Spain) Real Madrid

Tournament statistics
- Matches played: 30
- Goals scored: 88 (2.93 per match)

The 1980 winners of the Torneo di Viareggio (in English, the Viareggio Tournament, officially the Viareggio Cup World Football Tournament Coppa Carnevale), the annual youth football tournament held in Viareggio, Tuscany, are listed below.

== Format ==
The 16 teams are seeded in 4 groups. Each team from a group meets the others in a single tie. The winner of each group progress to the final knockout stage.

== Participating teams ==
Italian teams

- (Italy) Avellino
- (Italy) Fiorentina
- (Italy) Juventus
- (Italy) Lazio
- (Italy) Milan
- (Italy) Napoli
- (Italy) Perugia
- (Italy) Torino
- (Italy) Udinese

European teams

- (Spain) Real Madrid
- (Greece) Aris Thessaloniki
- (Socialist Federal Republic of Yugoslavia) Partizan Beograd
- (Austria) First Vienna
- (Scotland) Celtic
- (Czechoslovakia) Dukla Praha
- (Portugal) Porto

American teams

- (Argentina) River Plate

== Group stage ==
=== Group A ===
Team	Pts	Pld	W	D	L	GF	GA	GD
(Italy) Fiorentina	5	3	2	1	0	5	3	+2
(Argentina) River Plate	4	3	2	0	1	4	1	+3
(Greece) Aris Thessaloniki	2	3	0	2	1	3	6	-3
(Italy) Avellino	1	3	0	1	2	2	4	-2

=== Group B ===
Team	Pts	Pld	W	D	L	GF	GA	GD
(Italy) Napoli	5	3	2	1	0	5	0	+5
(Czechoslovakia) Dukla Praha	5	3	2	1	0	5	1	+4
(Italy) Torino	1	3	0	1	2	2	6	-4
(Socialist Federal Republic of Yugoslavia) Partizan Beograd	1	3	0	1	2	3	8	-5

=== Group C ===
Team	Pts	Pld	W	D	L	GF	GA	GD
(Italy) Milan	4	3	2	0	1	5	1	+4
(Portugal) Porto	4	3	2	0	1	4	2	+2
(Italy) Perugia	4	3	2	0	1	4	5	-1
(Austria) First Vienna	0	3	0	0	3	1	6	-5

=== Group D ===
Team	Pts	Pld	W	D	L	GF	GA	GD
(Italy) Lazio	4	3	1	2	0	5	2	+3
(Spain) Real Madrid	3	3	0	3	0	4	4	0
(Italy) Juventus	3	3	1	1	1	5	7	-2
(Scotland) Celtic	2	3	0	0	3	4	5	-1

== Knockout stage ==
Quarter-finals
(Italy) Napoli(pen)	0
(Argentina) River Plate	0
(Czechoslovakia) Dukla Praha	2
(Italy) Fiorentina	1
(Italy) Milan	0
(Spain) Real Madrid(pen)	0
(Italy) Lazio	1
(Portugal) Porto	0

Semi-finals
(Italy) Napoli	0
(Czechoslovakia) Dukla Praha(pen)	0
(Spain) Real Madrid	1
(Italy) Lazio(pen)	1

Final
(Czechoslovakia) Dukla Praha	1
(Italy) Lazio	0
Third place
(Italy) Napoli	2
(Spain) Real Madrid	0

== Champions ==
Torneo di Viareggio 1980 Champions

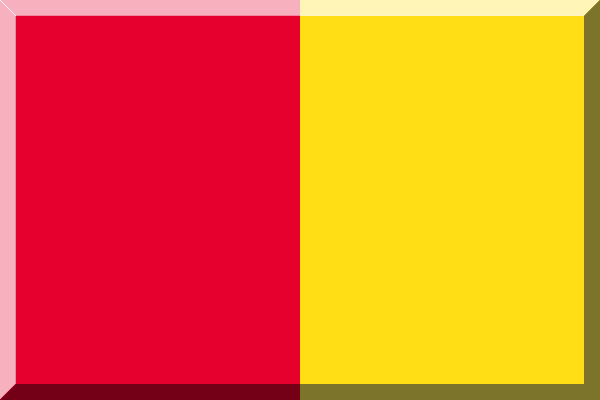

Dukla Praha
6th time
