= 2001 Torneo di Viareggio =

2001 Torneo Mondiale di Calcio Coppa Carnevale
53° Torneo di Viareggio

Tournament details
- Host country: Italy
- City: Viareggio
- Dates: 12 February 2001 - 26 February 2001
- Teams: 40

Final positions
- Champions: (Italy) Milan
- Runners-up: (Brazil) Vitória
- Third place: (Brazil) Ituano
- Fourth place: (Italy) Torino

Tournament statistics
- Matches played: 76
- Goals scored: 169 (2.22 per match)

The 2001 winners of the Torneo di Viareggio (in English, the Viareggio Tournament, officially the Viareggio Cup World Football Tournament Coppa Carnevale), the annual youth football tournament held in Viareggio, Tuscany, are listed below.

== Format ==
The 40 teams are seeded in 10 pools, split up into 5-pool groups. Each team from a pool meets the others in a single tie. The winning club from each pool and three best runners-up from both group A and group B progress to the final knockout stage. All matches in the final rounds are single tie. The Round of 16 envisions penalties and no extra time, while the rest of the final round matches include 30 minutes extra time with Golden goal rule and penalties to be played if the draw between teams still holds. Semifinal losing teams play 3rd-place final with penalties after regular time. The winning sides play the final with extra time, noGolden goal rule and repeat the match if the draw holds.

== Participating teams ==
Italian teams

- (Italy) Atalanta
- (Italy) Bari
- (Italy) Brescia
- (Italy) Empoli
- (Italy) Fiorentina
- (Italy) Inter Milan
- (Italy) Juventus
- (Italy) Lazio
- (Italy) Milan
- (Italy) Napoli
- (Italy) Padova
- (Italy) Palermo
- (Italy) Parma
- (Italy) Perugia
- (Italy) Reggina
- (Italy) Roma
- (Italy) Salernitana
- (Italy) Siena
- (Italy) Torino
- (Italy) Verona
- (Italy) Vicenza

European teams

- (North Macedonia) Belasica
- (Portugal) Vilanovense
- (Belgium) Standard Liège
- (Romania) UTA Arad
- (Greece) AEK Athens

African teams

- (South Africa) Jomo Cosmos

Asian teams

- (China) Guangdong Chaoneng

American teams

- (Colombia) Independiente Santa Fe
- (Mexico) Pumas
- (United States) New York City
- (Argentina) Quilmes
- (Brazil) Juventus Atlético Clube
- (Brazil) Corinthians
- (Brazil) Ituano
- (Brazil) Vitória
- (Brazil) Campinas
- (Brazil) Bauru
- (Brazil) XV de Novembro

Oceanian teams

- (Australia) Marconi Stallions

== Group stage ==
=== Group 1 ===
Team	Pts	Pld	W	D	L	GF	GA	GD
(Italy) Fiorentina	7	3	2	1	0	3	1	+2
(Brazil) Corinthians	5	3	1	2	0	3	1	+2
(Belgium) Standard Liège	2	3	0	2	1	1	4	-3
(Italy) Empoli	1	3	0	1	2	1	2	-1

=== Group 2 ===
Team	Pts	Pld	W	D	L	GF	GA	GD
(Italy) Napoli	7	3	2	1	0	6	1	+5
(Brazil) Vitória	7	3	2	1	1	5	0	+5
(Italy) Padova	3	3	0	0	1	3	3	0
(China) Guangdong Chaoneng	0	3	0	0	3	2	12	-10

=== Group 3 ===
Team	Pts	Pld	W	D	L	GF	GA	GD
(Italy) Torino	7	3	2	1	0	4	2	+2
(Brazil) Ituano	6	3	2	0	1	8	3	+5
(Italy) Reggina	4	3	1	1	1	4	6	-2
(South Africa) Jomo Cosmos	0	3	0	0	3	3	8	-5

=== Group 4 ===
Team	Pts	Pld	W	D	L	GF	GA	GD
(Argentina) Quilmes	7	3	2	1	0	7	3	+4
(Italy) Bari	4	3	1	1	1	4	5	-1
(Italy) Perugia	4	3	1	1	1	2	3	-1
(North Macedonia) Belasica	1	3	0	1	2	6	8	-2

=== Group 5 ===
Team	Pts	Pld	W	D	L	GF	GA	GD
(Italy) Milan	7	3	2	1	0	4	1	+3
(Italy) Vicenza	5	3	1	2	0	4	3	+1
(Brazil) Juventus Atlético Clube	3	3	1	0	2	2	3	-1
(Mexico) Pumas	1	3	0	1	2	1	4	-3

=== Group 6 ===
Team	Pts	Pld	W	D	L	GF	GA	GD
(Italy) Verona	6	3	2	0	1	5	1	+4
(Brazil) Campinas	6	3	2	0	1	3	1	+2
(Italy) Parma	3	3	1	0	2	4	4	0
(United States) New York City	3	3	1	0	2	2	8	-6

=== Group 7 ===
Team	Pts	Pld	W	D	L	GF	GA	GD
(Italy) Atalanta	7	3	2	1	0	6	2	+3
(Italy) Salernitana	7	3	2	1	0	3	1	+2
(Colombia) Independiente Santa Fe	1	3	0	1	2	1	3	-2
(Romania) UTA Arad	1	3	0	1	3	0	4	-4

=== Group 8 ===
Team	Pts	Pld	W	D	L	GF	GA	GD
(Italy) Juventus	9	3	3	0	0	9	2	+7
(Italy) Brescia	4	3	1	1	1	5	4	+1
(Italy) Siena	4	3	1	1	1	3	2	+1
(Greece) AEK Athens	0	3	0	0	3	2	11	-9

=== Group 9 ===
Team	Pts	Pld	W	D	L	GF	GA	GD
(Italy) Roma	9	3	3	0	0	4	1	+3
(Portugal) Vilanovense	4	3	1	1	1	1	1	0
(Brazil) Bauru	3	3	1	0	2	3	4	-1
(Italy) Palermo	1	3	0	1	2	3	5	-2

=== Group 10 ===
Team	Pts	Pld	W	D	L	GF	GA	GD
(Italy) Inter Milan	7	3	2	1	0	4	1	+3
(Italy) Lazio	6	3	2	0	1	6	1	+5
(Brazil) XV de Novembro	2	3	0	2	1	2	6	-4
(Australia) Marconi Stallions	1	3	0	1	2	1	5	-4

== Knockout stage ==
Round of 16
21 february
(Italy) Napoli	0 (4)
(Italy) Salernitana (pen)	0 (5)
21 february
(Italy) Torino	1
(Italy) Verona	0
21 february
(Italy) Milan	1
(Brazil) Campinas	0
21 february
(Argentina) Quilmes	1
(Italy) Lazio	0
21 february
(Italy) Roma	1
(Brazil) Ituano	2
21 february
(Italy) Atalanta	0 (2)
(Italy) Fiorentina (pen)	0 (4)
21 february
(Italy) Inter Milan	0
(Brazil) Vitória	1
21 february
(Italy) Juventus	1
(Brazil) Corinthians	0

Quarter-finals
22 february
(Italy) Salernitana	1
(Italy) Torino (g.g. a.e.t.)	2
22 february
(Italy) Milan (g.g. a.e.t.)	1
(Argentina) Quilmes	0
22 february
(Brazil) Ituano	1
(Italy) Fiorentina	0
22 february
(Brazil) Vitória (pen)	2 (3)
(Italy) Juventus	2 (1)

Semi-finals
24 february
(Italy) Torino	0
(Italy) Milan	1
24 february
(Brazil) Ituano	1
(Brazil) Vitória	2

Final
26 february
(Italy) Milan	3
(Brazil) Vitória	1
Third place
26 february
(Italy) Torino	1 (3)
(Brazil) Ituano (pen)	1 (4)

== Champions ==
Torneo di Viareggio 2001 Champions

Milan
8th time
