= Campionato Primavera =

Campionato Primavera may refer to:

- Campionato Nazionale Primavera, a defunct youth competition of Italian football
- Campionato Primavera 1, current top level of Italian football in under-19 age group
- Campionato Primavera 2, the second-highest level of Italian football in under-19 age group
- Campionato Primavera 3
