= Alessandro Lupi =

Italian footballer and coach (born 1970)

Personal information
- Date of birth: 28 July 1970 (age 56)
- Place of birth: Italy
- Position: Midfielder

Senior career*
Years	Team	Apps	(Gls)
–1993	SolbiaSommese		
2000–2001	Lugano		
2001–2002	Chiasso		
2002–2003	Pro Patria		
2003–2004	SolbiaSommese		
2004	Lecco		
2004–2005	Chiasso		

Managerial career
- 2011–2017: Milan (academy)
- 2017: Milan U17
- 2017–2018: Milan U19
- 2019–2020: Chiasso
- 2021–2022: Monza (academy)
- 2022: Monza U18
- 2022–2024: Monza U19
- * Club domestic league appearances and goals

Alessandro Lupi (born 28 July 1970) is an Italian professional football manager and former player who is head coach of Monza's under-19 team.

== Coaching career ==
Luppi joined AC Milan in 2011 and worked as head of academy for six years, and in 2017, he was appointed U17 team head coach. When Gennaro Gattuso was appointed head coach of Milan, he was promoted to the U19 coach. In 2019 he joined Chiasso as head coach.

On 15 September 2022, he replaced Raffaele Palladino as head coach of A.C. Monza's under-19s in the Campionato Primavera 2. He helped Monza gain promotion to the Campionato Primavera 1, after defeating Ascoli in the play-off final on penalties.
