= Lega Nazionale Professionisti =

Former professional association football organization in Italy

- Lega Nazionale Professionisti
- Abbreviation: LNP
- Predecessor: Lega Nazionale Alta Italia
- Successor: Lega Serie A Lega B
- Founded: 16 May 1946; 80 years ago
- Dissolved: 1 July 2010; 16 years ago
- Headquarters: Milan
- Region served: Italy
- Products: Serie A Serie B Serie C (1948–1959); Coppa Italia; Supercoppa Italiana; Campionato Primavera; Coppa Italia Primavera; Supercoppa Primavera
- Members: 80 (1946–1947); 75 (1947–1948); 124 (1948–1950); 120 (1950–1951); 112 (1951–1952); 36 (1952–1958, 1968–1988); 38 (1958–1967, 1988–2003); 37 (1967–1968); 42 (2003–2010)
- Parent organization: FIGC

The Lega Nazionale Professionisti (English: Professionals National League), commonly known as Lega Calcio (English: Football League), was the governing body that ran the two highest association football divisions in Italy, namely Serie A and Serie B, from 1946 to 2010. The league also ruled the Serie C from 1948 to 1959. It has ceased to exist since 1 July 2010, following a split between Serie A and Serie B clubs, which led to the creation of two new leagues, the Lega Serie A and Lega Serie B respectively.

The Lega Calcio was founded as the Lega Nazionale (English: National League) on 16 May 1946, after the Second World War, and its name was changed in 1960, shortly after Italy fully recognized professional status for the players of the top divisions. Its predecessor during the fascist era, between 1926 and 1944, was the Direttorio Divisioni Superiori (Directory of Higher Divisions), a committee whose president was appointed by the FIGC. Earlier still before, the first football league in Italy was the Lega Nord (Northern League), which was composed of the major clubs of Northern Italy from 1921 to 1926.

Promotion and relegation between the divisions were a central feature of the league: at the end of the season the bottom clubs of Serie B switched with the top clubs of the Lega Pro (or its predecessors), thus integrating the League into the Italian football league system. Besides, the Lega Calcio also organized the main Italian cup competition, the Coppa Italia and the Supercoppa Italiana.

== Competition ==
=== League ===
The member clubs of the Lega Calcio were grouped into two divisions: the Serie A and Serie B. In any given season a club played each of the others in the same division twice, once at their home stadium and once at that of their opponents.

Clubs gained three points for a win (two before 1994) one for a draw, and none for a defeat. At the end of each season, the club with the most points in the Serie A was crowned champion. If points were equal, the head-to-head records determined the winner (tie-breakers were also used in the past). If still equal, the goal difference and then goals scored became the deciding factors. As for Serie B, at the top end two, three or four clubs won promotion to Serie A, with the bottom Serie A clubs taking their places. At the lower end, three or four club were relegated to the Serie C, while teams from the Lega C joined in their place.

Promotion and relegation were determined by final league positions, but to sustain interest for more clubs over the length of the season in the later years one promotion place from Serie B was decided according to a playoff between four clubs, which took place at the end of the season. It was therefore possible for a team finishing sixth in the championship to be promoted rather than the clubs finishing immediately above them in the standings. Likewise, one relegation place to the Serie C1 was decided according to a playoff between two clubs.

Youth teams of Lega Calcio clubs played in the Campionato Nazionale Primavera, as well as competing in their own cup competitions, such as the Coppa Italia Primavera and the Supercoppa Primavera.

=== Cup ===
The Lega Calcio organised a cup competition, the Coppa Italia, open to all Serie A and Serie B clubs and some clubs from the Serie C.

=== Super Cup ===
The Lega Calcio also organised the Supercoppa Italiana, between the champions of the Serie A and the winners of the Coppa Italia.

== 2010 split ==
On 30 April 2009, after divisions between Serie A and Serie B clubs regarding the future of the league, 19 of 20 top flight clubs (the only exception being U.S. Lecce) agreed on plans to split from Serie B to form another governing and financing body, with the same name Serie A, in a move reminiscent of England's Premier League formation in 1992. Subsequently, on 1 July 2010, the Lega Calcio has officially ceased to exist and replaced by the two newly formed leagues, Lega Serie A and Lega Serie B.

== List of Lega Nazionale Professionisti presidents ==
- 1946–50: Piero Pedroni
- 1950–57: Saverio Giulini
- 1958–59: Giuseppe Pasquale (interim)^{[1]}
- 1959–62: Giuseppe Pasquale
- 1962–64: Giorgio Perlasca
- 1964–65: Artemio Franchi (interim)^{[1]}
- 1965–73: Aldo Stacchi
- 1973–76: Franco Carraro
- 1976–77: Antonio Griffi
- 1977–78: Franco Carraro (interim)^{[1]}
- 1978–81: Renzo Righetti
- 1982–87: Antonio Matarrese
- 1987–96: Luciano Nizzola
- 1997–2001: Franco Carraro
- 2002–06: Adriano Galliani
- 2006–09: Antonio Matarrese
- 2009: Giancarlo Abete (interim)^{[1]}
- 2009–10: Maurizio Beretta

^{1} : interim commissioner appointed directly by the Italian Football Federation

== Official Match Ball ==
- 2007–08: Nike T90 Aerow II
- 2008–09: Nike T90 Omni
- 2009–10: Nike T90 Ascente
