= SSC Napoli Youth Sector =

Napoli Primavera
- Full name: Società Sportiva Calcio Napoli Primavera
- Nickname: Azzurrini
- Founded: 1926
- Ground: Stadio Arena Giuseppe Piccolo
- Owner: Aurelio De Laurentiis
- President: Edoardo De Laurentiis
- Head coach: Salvatore Galizia
- League: Campionato Primavera 2
Home colours	Away colours	Third colours

The youth sector is responsible for managing all the teams registered by SSC Napoli into their youth leagues that is governed by the FIGC for various National and International tournaments. The objective of this policy is to train and enhance young members of SSC Napoli so that they can be launched in the world of professional football, creating a pool of talent from which the first team can draw on a player and want a chance in your team

== Squads ==
The Youth Sector, according to the Italian football league system, is divided into six squads: 'Primavera', 'Berretti', 'Allievi Nazionali', 'Giovanissimi', 'Esordienti' and 'Pulcini'.

In the 1962-1963 season the FIGC decided to create a national youth championship called the Campionato Primavera. In which the Naples has participated in since the first edition with mixed success. In the early sixties a young youth star was born in the median of Antonio Juliano, who would soon debut in the first team and become the second most capped player to ever play for Napoli with 505 appearances in the league and cup alone. Since then, several future international players have emerged, including the likes of Fabio Cannavaro and Lorenzo Insigne.

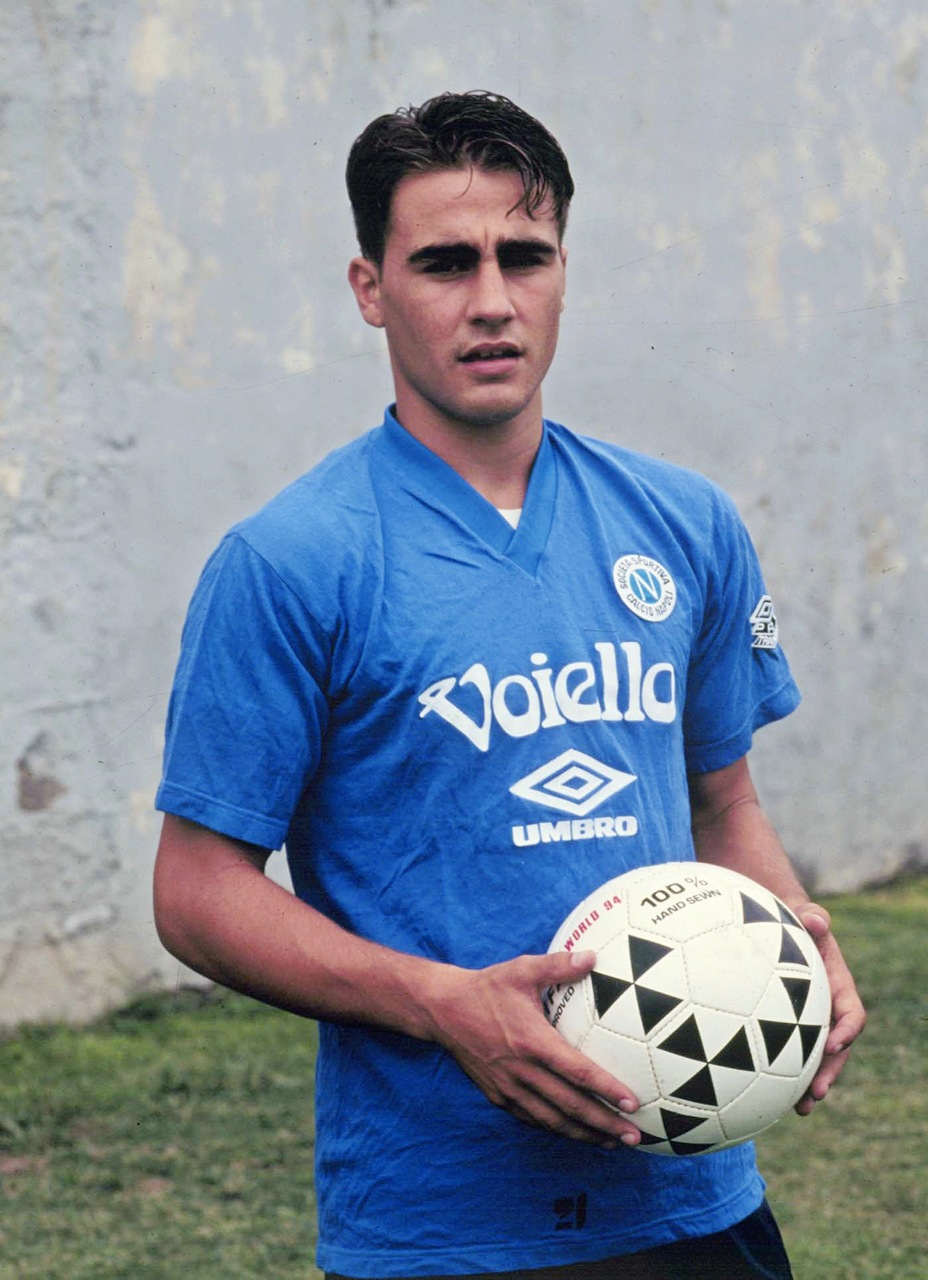
Fabio Cannavaro, World champion and Ballon d'Or winner 2006, a product of the Napoli Youth team.

=== 'Primavera' Squad ===
Società Sportiva Calcio Napoli Primavera is the Napoli football team composed of footballers between 15 and 20 years old. According to Italian Football’s hierarchy, it is the main youth category and is thus above the 'Berretti' squad. Each season, the 'Primavera' squad is the experimental group for the trial and/or promotion of the future members of the first team before the beginning of the Serie A season. Players deemed ready for first team football are registered and given a first team squad number. The team currently competes in group C of the Primavera TIM Championship.They have won the Primavera TIM Championship better known as Campionato Nazionale Primavera once in the 1978–79 Primavera season.

They also participate in the Coppa Italia Primavera and have been Champions once in 1997 they also compete in the annual Torneo di Viareggio one of the most prestigious U-20 championships in the world, an international tournament they have won and been runners-up 4 times.

The Primavera team also took part in the very first UEFA U-19 Champions League now called The UEFA Youth League after the Napoli first team qualified for the Champions League which gave the Primavera team access into the UEFA U-19 Champions League tournament, Napoli was put into Group F of the tournament with Olympique de Marseille, Arsenal F.C. and Borussia Dortmund. Napoli beat all the teams in the group, Olympique de Marseille, Arsenal F.C. and Borussia Dortmund at home to progress to the last 16 which saw them draw Real Madrid which they lost 2-1 in stoppage time with a goal by Aleix Febas Pérez in the 93rd minute.

== Primavera squad ==
As of 9 July 2026

Note: Flags indicate national team as defined under FIFA eligibility rules; some limited exceptions apply. Players may hold more than one non-FIFA nationality.

No.	Pos.	Nation	Player
1	GK	ITA	Claudio Pugliese
2	DF	ITA	Raffaele Colella
3	DF	ITA	Alfonso De Luca
4	MF	ITA	Antonio Cimmaruta
5	DF	ITA	Vittorio Gambardella
6	DF	ITA	Christian Garofalo
7	FW	ITA	Manuel Nardozi
8	MF	ITA	Emmanuele De Chiara
9	FW	ITA	Christian Raggioli
10	FW	ITA	Salvatore Borriello
11	FW	ITA	Andrea Smeraldi
14	MF	ITA	Vincenzo Prisco
17	DF	ITA	Giuseppe D'Angelo
18	MF	CRO	Ivan Anić
21	MF	ITA	Vincenzo Testa

No.	Pos.	Nation	Player
23	FW	ARG	Milton Pereyra
25	FW	ITA	Christian Torre
26	FW	ITA	Elia Favicchio
27	FW	ITA	Andrea Iovine
28	DF	UKR	Mykyta Melnyk
30	FW	ITA	Umberto Camelio
44	DF	ITA	Francesco Eletto
60	MF	ARG	Francisco Baridó
70	MF	ITA	Marco Genovese
80	FW	ITA	Luigi Esposito
95	GK	ITA	David Spinelli
99	GK	ITA	Raffaele Celiento
—	DF	ITA	Favour Enoghegass
—	FW	KOS	Adam Hasani
—	FW	SEN	Mohamed Seick Mané

- Primavera Staff
  - Head coach: (Italy) Salvatore Galizia

=== Managerial history ===
- (Italy) Mario Corso (1978-1982)
- (Italy) Luigi Caffarelli (1997–2007)
- (Italy) Raimondo Marino (2003–2004)
- (Italy) Roberto Miggiano (2010–2011)
- (Italy) Adolfo Sormani (2011–2012)
- (Italy) Giampaolo Saurini (2012–2017)
- (Italy) Loris Beoni (2017–2018)
- (Italy) Roberto Baronio (2018–2020)
- (Italy) Giuseppe Angelini (2020)
- (Italy) Emmanuel Cascione (2020–2021)
- (Italy) Nicolò Frustalupi (2021–2023)
- (Italy) Andrea Tedesco (2023–2024)

=== Honours ===
- Scudetto
  - Champions (1): 1978–79
  - Runner Up (–): —
- Coppa Italia
  - Champions (1): 1996-97
  - Runner Up (1): 2012-13
- Super Coppa
  - Runner Up (–): —
- Torneo di Viareggio Cup
  - Champions (1): 1975
  - Runner Up (4): 1969, 1984, 1990, 1991

== Allievi Nazionali Serie A & B (U17) - Allievi Professionisti (competes against Serie A and B clubs) ==
As of 15 September 2019

Note: Flags indicate national team as defined under FIFA eligibility rules; some limited exceptions apply. Players may hold more than one non-FIFA nationality.

No.	Pos.	Nation	Player
—	GK	ITA	Francesco Baietti
—	GK	ITA	Ciro Pinto
—	DF	ITA	Benedetto Barba
—	DF	ITA	Lorenzo Carannante
—	DF	ITA	Mauro Sepe
—	DF	ITA	Francesco Somma
—	DF	ITA	Antonio Vittiello
—	DF	ITA	Gioele Cirillo
—	DF	ITA	Domenico Verdile
—	DF	ITA	Roberto Natale
—	MF	ITA	Francesco Rossi
—	MF	ITA	Enrico Pio De Martino

No.	Pos.	Nation	Player
—	MF	ITA	Gennaro Iaccarino
—	MF	ITA	Manuel Matrone
—	MF	ITA	Raffaele D'Angelo
—	MF	ITA	Bruno Umile
—	MF	ITA	Davide Accampa
—	MF	ITA	Giuseppe D'Agostino
—	FW	ITA	Luca Assalve
—	FW	ITA	Paolo De Simone
—	FW	ITA	Antonio Vergara
—	FW	ITA	Antonio Cianciulli
—	FW	ITA	Ambrosino
—	FW	ARG	Ludovico Benjamín Pelagotti

- Allievi Nazionali Staff
  - Head coach: Massimo Carnevale
  - Assistant coach: Antonio Vanacore
  - Physical Trainer: Arcangelo Crispino
  - Goalkeeping coach: Massimiliano Di Gliulo
  - Team Leader: Luca Lentini

== Allievi Lega Pro I & II (U17) - Allievi Lega Pro (competes against Lega Pro clubs) ==
As of 19 August 2015

Note: Flags indicate national team as defined under FIFA eligibility rules; some limited exceptions apply. Players may hold more than one non-FIFA nationality.

No.	Pos.	Nation	Player
—	GK	ITA	Alessandro D'Andrea
—	GK	ITA	Antonio Maisto
—	DF	ITA	Gabriel Casolare
—	DF	ITA	Roberto Rea
—	DF	ITA	Niccolò Bartiromo
—	DF	ITA	Alberto Senese
—	DF	ITA	Andrea Mambella
—	DF	ITA	Giovanni Calvano
—	MF	ITA	Salvatore Micillo
—	MF	ITA	Antonio Illuminato

No.	Pos.	Nation	Player
—	MF	ITA	Matteo Coglitore
—	MF	ITA	Carmine Cristiano
—	MF	ITA	Nicola D'Alessandro
—	MF	ITA	Christian Velotti
—	FW	ITA	Ciro Palmieri
—	FW	ITA	Francesco Pirone
—	FW	ITA	Vincenzo Di Dato
—	FW	ITA	Sergio Gianfrancesco
—	FW	ITA	Angelo Lieto
—	FW	ITA	Marco Merola
—	FW	ITA	Roberto Kay

- Allievi Lega Pro Staff
  - Head coach: Vincenzo Marino
  - Assistant coach: Armando Nocerino
  - Physical Trainer: Giuseppe Trepiccione
  - Goalkeeping coach: Massimiliano Di Gliulo

== Notable former Youth Team players ==
Below is a list of some footballers who have played for the Napoli youth squads:

- (Italy) Paolo Cannavaro
- (Italy) Giuseppe Taglialatela
- (Italy) Jacopo Dezi
- (Italy) Antonio Floro Flores
- (Italy) Luigi Vitale
- (Italy) Antonio Bocchetti
- (Italy) Guglielmo Stendardo
- (Italy) Armando Izzo
- (Italy) Mariano Arini
- (Italy) Roberto Insigne
- (Italy) Alfonso De Lucia
- (Italy) Luigi Sepe
- (Italy) Antonio Di Nardo
- (Italy) Raffaele Ametrano
- (Italy) Angelo Pagotto
- (Italy) Vincenzo Bernardo
- (Italy) Raffaele Pucino
- (Italy) Carmelo Imbriani
- (Italy) Raffaele Longo
- (Italy) Fabio Liverani
- (Italy) Salvatore Bruno
- (Italy) Ferdinando Coppola
- (Italy) Dino Fava
- (Italy) Salvatore Russo
- (Italy) Roberto Sorrentino
- (Italy) Roberto Amodio
- (Italy) Camillo Ciano
- (Italy) Gennaro Esposito
- (Italy) Raffaele Maiello
- (Poland) Igor Łasicki
- (Italy) Sebastiano Luperto
- (Estonia) Frank Liivak
- (Italy) Giuseppe Fornito
- (Italy) Gennaro Tutino
- (Italy) Leandro Vitiello
- (Italy) Mariano Stendardo
- (Italy) Emanuele Troise
- (Italy) Giorgio Di Vicino
- (Italy) Raffaele Longo
- (Italy) Francesco Di Gennaro
- (Italy) Dario Bova
- (Hungary) Soma Novothny

=== Senior internationals ===
Italy

- (Italy) Fabio Cannavaro
- (Italy) Lorenzo Insigne
- (Italy) Fabio Liverani
- (Italy) Antonio Juliano
- (Italy) Francesco Baiano
- (Italy) Ciro Ferrara
- (Italy) Attila Sallustro
- (Italy) Alessio Zerbin
- (Italy) Armando Izzo
- (Italy) Paolo Cannavaro

Estonia

- (Estonia) Frank Liivak

Cyprus

- (Cyprus) Rafail Mamas

== See also ==
- Campionato Nazionale Primavera
- Coppa Italia Primavera
- Supercoppa Primavera
- Youth system
- Reserve team
- Youth Sector (cantera)
