= Alfred Gomis =

Senegalese footballer (born 1993)

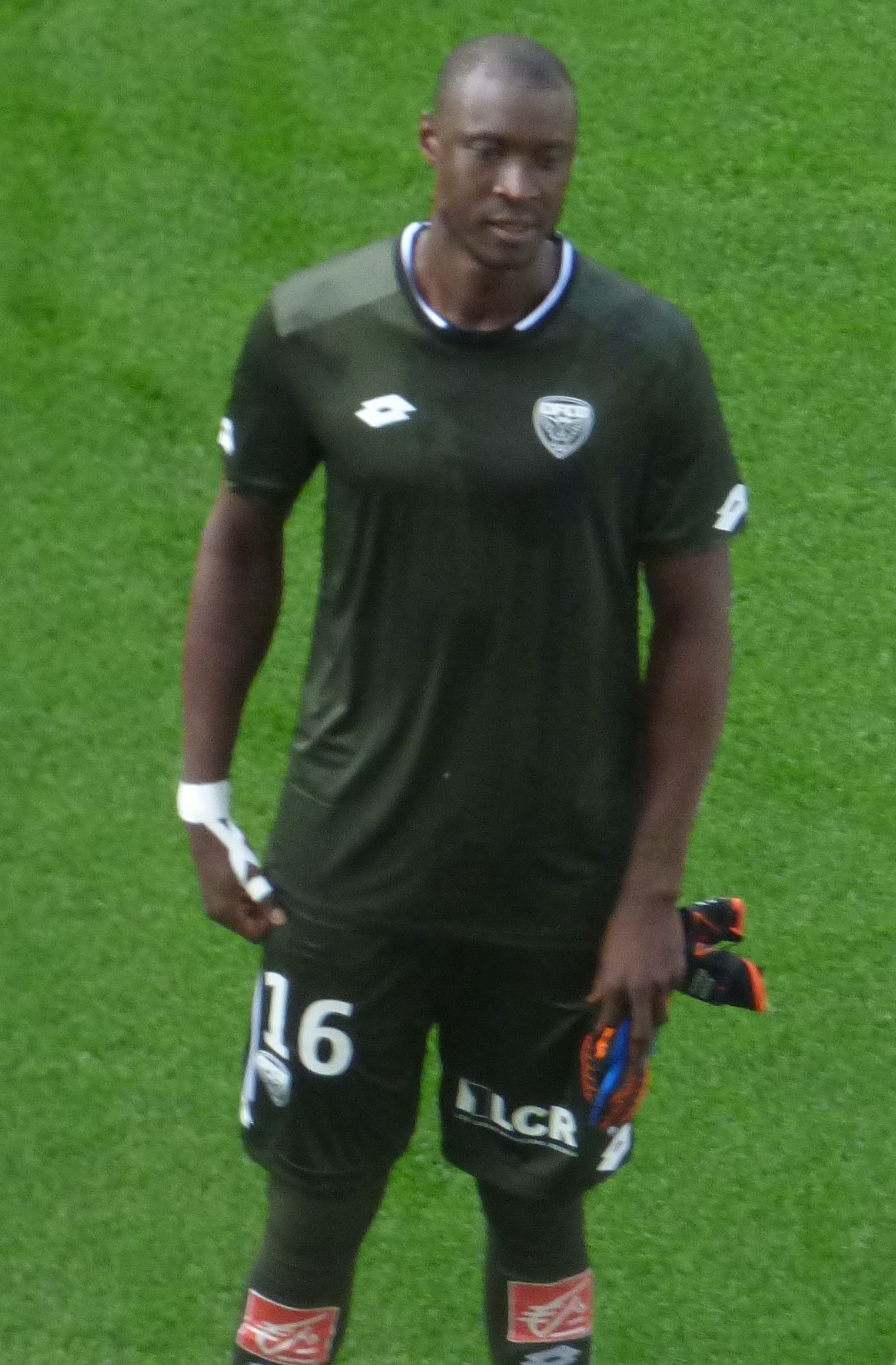
- Gomis with Dijon in 2020

Personal information
- Full name: Amigo Alfred Benjamin Junior Gomis
- Date of birth: 5 September 1993 (age 33)
- Place of birth: Ziguinchor, Senegal
- Height: 1.94 m (6 ft 4 in)
- Position: Goalkeeper

Team information
- Current team: Vis Pesaro
- Number: 25

Youth career
- 2010–2013: Torino

Senior career*
Years	Team	Apps	(Gls)
2013–2018	Torino	0	(0)
2013–2014	→ Crotone (loan)	39	(0)
2014–2015	→ Avellino (loan)	31	(0)
2015–2016	→ Cesena (loan)	38	(0)
2016–2017	→ Bologna (loan)	0	(0)
2017	→ Salernitana (loan)	21	(0)
2017–2018	→ SPAL (loan)	26	(0)
2018–2019	SPAL	20	(0)
2019–2020	Dijon	24	(0)
2020–2024	Rennes	47	(0)
2022–2024	Rennes B	1	(0)
2023	→ Como (loan)	17	(0)
2023–2024	→ Lorient (loan)	0	(0)
2024–2026	Palermo	4	(0)
2026–	Vis Pesaro	1	(1)

International career^{‡}
2017–2024	Senegal	16	(0)
Medal record
Men's football
Representing Senegal
Africa Cup of Nations
Winner	2021 Cameroon
Runner-up	2019 Egypt
- * Club domestic league appearances and goals as of 25 June 2026 ‡ National team caps and goals as of 28 March 2023

Amigo Alfred Benjamin Junior Gomis (born 5 September 1993) is a Senegalese professional footballer who plays as a goalkeeper for Vis Pesaro and the Senegal national team.

== Early life ==
Born in Ziguinchor, Senegal, he moved to Cuneo, Italy, with his family soon afterwards. He has two brothers who are also footballers: Lys and Maurice. He is a dual citizen of Italy and Senegal. He is of Bissau-Guinean descent through his maternal family.

== Club career ==
=== Early career ===
Gomis grew up in the Torino youth system, and on 3 July 2013, he was officially loaned to Calabrian club Crotone in Serie B. On 14 September, he made his debut against Spezia, which ended 1–0 for the Rossoblu. Despite his young age and lack of experience, Gomis played as a starter and collected 39 appearances, plus one appearance in the playoffs, as well as one in Coppa Italia.

At the end of the season, he was recalled by Torino, who decided to loan him again, but only after he was made available for the preliminaries of the Europa League as second-choice goalkeeper, behind Daniele Padelli, against Brommapojkarna on 31 July 2014.

==== Loan to Avellino ====
On 11 August 2014, Alfred was officially loaned to Avellino in Serie B with a buyout clause plus a buyback clause in favour of Torino. He made his official debut with the team on 17 August 2014, during the second round of Coppa Italia, which saw him maintain a clean sheet, the match ending 2–0 for Avellino. His league debut took place on 30 August, during the first day of the championship against Pro Vercelli, finishing 1–0 in favour of Vercelli. On 28 October 2014, he parried a penalty kicked by Rodrigo Taddei in the final minutes of a match against Perugia, ending 0–0. He played 31 matches in the league and finished first in the Top 15 of the goalkeepers in Serie B according to a list compiled by the Lega Serie B.

==== Loan to Cesena ====
On 30 July 2015, he was loaned to newly relegated Serie B club Cesena with a buyout clause and a buy-back clause in favour of Torino.

==== Loans to Bologna and Salernitana ====
On 31 August 2016, he was loaned to Bologna as an emergency signing to replace Antonio Mirante, who was diagnosed with a heart problem. However, Gomis himself was injured soon after his arrival. He made his debut for Bologna in Coppa Italia against Verona. Gomis was dropped out again after the cup match, including the league and the round 16 of the cup. He was recalled by Torino, and on 18 January 2018 he was loaned to Salernitana in Serie B.

=== SPAL ===
On 8 July 2017, Gomis joined SPAL on loan with an obligation to buy at the end of the loan period. The permanent deal for undisclosed fee was announced on 20 June 2018.

=== Dijon ===
On 20 August 2019, Gomis joined Dijon FCO from SPAL for an undisclosed fee on a four-year-contract.

=== Rennes ===
On 29 September 2020, Gomis joined fellow Ligue 1 side Rennes on a five-year deal, replacing the outgoing Édouard Mendy.

==== Loan to Como ====
On 27 January 2023, Gomis returned to Italy and joined Como in Serie B for the rest of the season.

=== Palermo ===
On 6 July 2024, Serie B club Palermo announced the signing of Gomis on a two-year contract. On his league season debut against Brescia, he suffered a severe knee injury that forced him to undergo a patellar tendon reconstruction surgery just a few days later. The injury kept him sidelined for the entire season.

On 11 August 2025, during a friendly game against Manchester City, Gomis broke the radius of his right arm, with a diagnosis of at least two months before full recovery.

== International career ==
=== Italy youth team ===
Gomis was called up to Italy under-20 in 2013 by Luigi Di Biagio, but did not make any appearances. In the same year, he was also called up to the Italy under-21 Serie B representative team by Massimo Piscedda, against the representative team from Russian Football National League. He was summoned by Piscedda for another game against the Italy under-21 played at the Partenio in Avellino. A starter on this occasion, he remained on the field for 68 minutes without conceding a goal.

=== Senegal ===
Gomis was then called up by the Senegal national team, making his senior international debut on 14 November 2017, starting in a 2–1 victory against South Africa in the last qualifying match for the 2018 FIFA World Cup. In May 2018 he was named in Senegal's 23 man squad for the 2018 FIFA World Cup in Russia. He participated in the 2021 AFCON.

He was appointed a Grand Officer of the National Order of the Lion by President of Senegal Macky Sall following the nation's victory at the 2021 Africa Cup of Nations.

== Career statistics ==
=== Club ===
As of match played 16 August 2024

Appearances and goals by club, season and competition
Club	Season	League			Cup		Europe		Other		Total	
Club	Season	Division	Apps	Goals	Apps	Goals	Apps	Goals	Apps	Goals	Apps	Goals
Crotone (loan)	2013–14	Serie B	39	0	1	0	—		1 (Note: All appearances in Serie B promotion play-offs)	0	41	0
Torino	2014–15	Serie A	0	0	0	0	0	0	—		0	0
Avellino (loan)	2014–15	Serie B	31	0	2	0	—		—		33	0
Cesena (loan)	2015–16	Serie B	38	0	0	0	—		1	0	39	0
Bologna (loan)	2016–17	Serie A	0	0	1	0	—		—		1	0
Salernitana (loan)	2016–17	Serie B	21	0	0	0	—		—		21	0
SPAL (loan)	2017–18	Serie A	26	0	2	0	—		—		28	0
SPAL	2018–19	Serie A	20	0	1	0	—		—		21	0
SPAL	Total		46	0	3	0	—		—		49	0
Dijon	2019–20	Ligue 1	19	0	2	0	—		—		21	0
Dijon	2020–21	Ligue 1	5	0	0	0	—		—		5	0
Dijon	Total		24	0	2	0	—		—		26	0
Rennes	2020–21	Ligue 1	22	0	1	0	4 (Note: All appearances in UEFA Champions League)	0	—		27	0
Rennes	2021–22	Ligue 1	25	0	1	0	6 (Note: All appearances in UEFA Europa Conference League)	0	—		32	0
Rennes	Total		47	0	2	0	10	0	—		59	0
Como (loan)	2022–23	Serie B	17	0	0	0	—		—		17	0
Lorient (loan)	2023–24	Ligue 1	0	0	1	0	—		—		1	0
Palermo	2024–25	Serie B	1	0	1	0	—		—		2	0
Palermo	2025–26	Serie B	0	0	0	0	—		—		0	0
Palermo	Total		1	0	1	0	—		—		2	0
Career total			264	0	13	0	10	0	2	0	289	0

=== International ===
As of match played 28 March 2023

Appearances and goals by national team and year
National team	Year	Apps	Goals
Senegal	2017	1	0
Senegal	2018	3	0
Senegal	2019	7	0
Senegal	2021	2	0
Senegal	2022	1	0
Senegal	2023	2	0
Senegal	2024	0	0
Total		16	0

== Honours ==
Senegal

- Africa Cup of Nations: 2021; runner-up: 2019

Individual

- Grand Officer of the National Order of the Lion: 2022
