= Maurice Gomis =

Bissau-Guinean footballer

Personal information
- Date of birth: 10 November 1997 (age 29)
- Place of birth: Cuneo, Italy
- Height: 1.93 m (6 ft 4 in)
- Position: Goalkeeper

Youth career
- Cuneo
- –2015: Torino

Senior career*
Years	Team	Apps	(Gls)
2015–2016	Torino	0	(0)
2015–2016	→ Delta Rovigo (loan)	4	(0)
2016	→ Mestre (loan)	10	(0)
2016–2017	Cuneo	32	(0)
2017–2018	Nocerina	27	(0)
2018–2021	SPAL	0	(0)
2018–2019	→ Siracusa (loan)	7	(0)
2019	→ Kukësi (loan)	1	(0)
2021–2022	Ayia Napa	12	(0)
2024–2025	Paradiso	4	(0)
2025	Chalkanoras Idaliou	11	(0)

International career^{‡}
2022–	Guinea-Bissau	2	(0)
- * Club domestic league appearances and goals as of 3 May 2026 ‡ National team caps and goals as of 21:09, 11 January 2022 (UTC)

Maurice Gomis (born 10 November 1997) is a professional footballer who plays as a goalkeeper. Born in Italy, he plays for the Guinea-Bissau national team.

== Club career ==
=== Torino ===
He is a product of Torino youth teams, just as his older brothers Lys Gomis and Alfred Gomis are, they are also both goalkeepers. He was included on their Under-19 squad for the first time at the age of 16 in the 2014–15 season. He did not make any appearances for that squad that season, serving as back-up for Andrea Zaccagno and Nicholas Lentini. In the next 2015–16 season he was sent on loans to Serie D teams, first Delta Rovigo and then Mestre.

On 19 July 2016, he joined his hometown team Cuneo on a permanent basis, also in the Serie D. He became the first-choice goalkeeper for the club in the subsequent 2016–17 season.

On 29 August 2017, he moved to yet another Serie D club, this time Nocerina. At Nocerina, Gomis also was the first-choice goalkeeper.

=== SPAL ===
On 6 July 2018, he signed a three-year contract with Serie A club SPAL, where he became the back-up to his own brother Alfred.

==== Loan to Siracusa ====
On 26 July 2018, he joined Serie C club Siracusa on a season-long loan. On 9 September 2018, he suffered minor injuries in a car accident which also killed the driver of the car, 27-year-old Siracusa club employee Davide Artale.

Upon his recovery, he made his Serie C debut for Siracusa on 15 October 2018 in a game against Reggina.

==== Loan to Kukësi ====
On 31 January 2019, he moved to Albania on a new loan to Kukësi.

== International career ==
Gomis was called up by Guinea-Bissau in late May 2021. He debuted with them in a 0–0 2021 Africa Cup of Nations tie with Sudan on 11 January 2022.

== Personal life ==
Gomis' older brothers, Lys and Alfred, have represented Senegal internationally. He is of Senegalese and Bissau-Guinean descent.
