= Campionato Nazionale Primavera =

Italian football youth competition

Campionato Primavera TIM - Trofeo "Giacinto Facchetti"
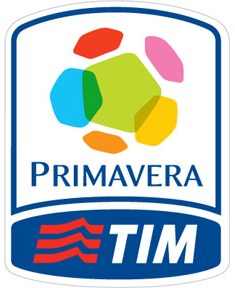
- Founded: 1962
- Folded: 2017
- Replaced by: Campionato Primavera 1; Campionato Primavera 2
- Owners: Lega Serie A (organizer); Lega Calcio (organizer until 2010)
- No. of teams: 42 teams (regular season); 14 teams (finals)
- Country: Italy
- Continent: UEFA
- Last champion: Internazionale (8th title)
- Most titles: Torino (9 titles)
- Broadcaster: Sportitalia
- Domestic cup: Coppa Italia Primavera
- International cups: Torneo di Viareggio (informal); UEFA Youth League (informal)
- Website: Legaseriea.it

The Campionato Nazionale Primavera – Trofeo Giacinto Facchetti, was an Italian football youth competition. It is organised by the Lega Serie A and the participating teams that take part in Serie A and Serie B: the first edition was held in the 1962–63 season, in place of the "Campionato Cadetti". Due to ceremonial reasons, the league is officially called Campionato Primavera Tim – Trofeo Giacinto Facchetti.

Torino have the highest number of titles, having won the Campionato Primavera nine times.

From the 2017–18 season, the league was replaced with Campionato Primavera 1 and Campionato Primavera 2.

== Competition format ==
From the 2012–13 season players who are at least 15 years old and who are under 19 in the calendar year of the season ends (i.e. born 1994 for 2012–13 season). At the discretion of the league, teams are allowed a maximum of four "non-quota" (Italian: fuori quota) players, of which one has no age limit and the rest must be under 20; until the 2011–12 season the age limit was 20 and for the "non-quota" player was 21.

The initial phase of the Primavera Championship consists of 3 rounds, each consisting of 14 teams, organised by geographical criteria: teams play in a true robin-round format, for a total of 26 games in the regular season. The top two in each group have direct access to the final phase: the remaining two positions are assigned via the play-offs, with the participation of eight teams (the third and fourth ranked, plus the fifth best). The matching pattern is as following:

- First round:
  - Best 3rd vs. second-best 5th (match n. 1);
  - Best 4th vs. second-best 4th (match n. 2);
  - Best 5th vs. second-best 3rd (match n. 3);
  - Worst 3rd vs. worst 4th (match n. 4);
- Second round:
  - Winner of match 1 vs. winner of match 2;
  - Winner of match 3 vs. winner of match 4;

The latest slots (two) are awarded after a play-off series, in which eight teams are involved: the final stage (also «Final Eight»), held on a neutral venue, is based on knockout format. The final phase of the Primavera Championship is hosted every year by a different region: the winning team is awarded a trophy, like the Serie A trophy (received, as a reward, by the Italian Champions). The winners are eligible for Supercoppa Primavera, against Coppa Italia Primavera winners: if the same club wins both competitions, the runners-up of Coppa Italia are admitted in Supercoppa.

== Past winners ==
- 1962–63 Juventus (A) and Como (B)
- 1963–64 Internazionale (A) and Udinese (B)
- 1964–65 Milan (A) and SPAL (B)
- 1965–66 Internazionale (A) and Padova (B)
- 1966–67 Torino (A) and Hellas Verona (B)
- 1967–68 Torino (A) and Verona (B)
- 1968–69 Internazionale (A) and Brescia (B)
- 1969–70 Torino
- 1970–71 Fiorentina
- 1971–72 Juventus
- 1972–73 Roma
- 1973–74 Roma
- 1974–75 Brescia
- 1975–76 Lazio
- 1976–77 Torino
- 1977–78 Roma
- 1978–79 Napoli
- 1979–80 Fiorentina
- 1980–81 Udinese
- 1981–82 Cesena
- 1982–83 Fiorentina
- 1983–84 Roma
- 1984–85 Torino
- 1985–86 Cesena
- 1986–87 Lazio
- 1987–88 Torino
- 1988–89 Internazionale
- 1989–90 Roma
- 1990–91 Torino
- 1991–92 Torino
- 1992–93 Atalanta
- 1993–94 Juventus
- 1994–95 Lazio
- 1995–96 Perugia
- 1996–97 Perugia
- 1997–98 Atalanta
- 1998–99 Empoli
- 1999–2000 Bari
- 2000–01 Lazio
- 2001–02 Internazionale
- 2002–03 Lecce
- 2003–04 Lecce
- 2004–05 Roma
- 2005–06 Juventus
- 2006–07 Internazionale
- 2007–08 Sampdoria
- 2008–09 Palermo
- 2009–10 Genoa
- 2010–11 Roma
- 2011–12 Internazionale
- 2012–13 Lazio
- 2013–14 Chievo Verona
- 2014–15 Torino
- 2015–16 Roma
- 2016–17 Internazionale
- Since 2017–18 Replaced by Campionato Primavera 1 and Campionato Primavera 2

== See also ==
- Coppa Italia Primavera
- Supercoppa Primavera
- Serie A
- Serie B
- Młoda Ekstraklasa – Polish equivalent
