= SS Lazio Youth Sector =

Italian football club

Lazio Primavera
- Full name: Società Sportiva Lazio Primavera
- Nicknames: I Biancocelesti (The White and Sky Blues); I Biancazzurri (The White and Blues); Le Aquile (The Eagles); Gli Aquilotti (The Eaglets)
- Ground: Centro Sportivo di Formello – Rome, Lazio, Italy
- Capacity: 3,000
- President: Claudio Lotito
- Head coach: Francesco Punzi
- League: Campionato Primavera 1
- 2022-23: Campionato Primavera 2, 1st (Promoted)
- Website: http://www.sslazio.it/it/giovanili/primavera
Home colours	Away colours	Third colours

SS Lazio Youth Sector (Italian: Settore Giovanile) comprises the under-19 team (Italian: Primavera) and the academies of Italian professional football club SS Lazio.

== Lazio Primavera ==
The under-20 squad (Italian: Primavera) usually competes in the Campionato Primavera 1.

The club's Primavera side have been champions of Italy five times, having last won the championship back in 2012–13 after beating Atalanta 3-0 in the final. They have also won the Coppa Italia Primavera on three occasions (1978-79, 2013-14, 2014-15) and the Supercoppa Primavera on one occasion (2014-15).

Alessandro Calori was in charge of Lazio Primavera since June 11, 2021 until June 30, 2022. He replaced Leonardo Menichini who managed the team for 55 matches (17W-10D-28L).

=== Current squad ===
As of 8 July 2026

Note: Flags indicate national team as defined under FIFA eligibility rules; some limited exceptions apply. Players may hold more than one non-FIFA nationality.

No.	Pos.	Nation	Player
1	GK	ITA	Gioele Bosi
2	DF	ITA	Federico Ciucci
3	DF	ITA	Lorenzo Calvani
4	MF	ITA	Valerio Battisti
5	DF	BRA	Ricardo Bordon
6	DF	ITA	Mattia Santagostino Baldi
7	FW	ITA	Cristian Cuzzarella
8	MF	ITA	Flavio Milillo
9	FW	ALB	Flavio Sulejmani
10	MF	ITA	Valerio Gelli
11	MF	ALB	Kledi Marinaj
12	DF	ALB	Kleo Shpuza
14	DF	ITA	Cristiano Trifelli
17	FW	ITA	Federico Serra

No.	Pos.	Nation	Player
18	MF	ITA	Valerio Farcomeni
19	MF	ITA	Giorgio Canali
21	MF	ITA	Tommaso Montano
22	GK	ITA	Nicolò Panozzo
24	DF	ITA	Lorenzo Ferrari
30	DF	ITA	Leonardo Pernaselci
33	MF	ITA	Emanuele Cangemi
40	MF	ITA	Simone Curzi
50	GK	ITA	Luigi D'Alessio
71	GK	ITA	Giacomo Giacomone
—	DF	ROU	Raul Avram
—	DF	GAM	Sheikh Tijan Touray
—	FW	CIV	Moustapha Berete

=== Out on loan ===
Note: Flags indicate national team as defined under FIFA eligibility rules; some limited exceptions apply. Players may hold more than one non-FIFA nationality.

No.	Pos.	Nation	Player

== Non-playing staff (under-20 squad) ==
- Head coach: (Italy) Francesco Punzi
- Assistant coach: (Italy) Pierfrancesco Scalisi

== Lazio U17 ==
The under-17 squad currently competes in the Allievi Nazionali U17 - Serie A/B - Girone C.

== Non-playing staff (under-17 squad) ==
- Head coach: (Italy) Luca Catracchia

== Notable former Primavera and youth team players ==
Many players from Lazio's Primavera squad go on to have careers in professional football, whether at Lazio or at other clubs. The following is a list of players who have represented their country at full international level and/or have played regularly at a high level of club football.

- (Albania) Thomas Strakosha
- (Australia) Chris Ikonomidis
- (Croatia) Josip Elez
- (Croatia) Franjo Prce
- (Italy) Danilo Cataldi
- (Italy) Luca Crecco
- (Italy) Lorenzo De Silvestri
- (Italy) Luigi Di Biagio
- (Italy) Paolo Di Canio
- (Italy) Marco Di Vaio
- (Italy) Davide Faraoni
- (Italy) Valerio Fiori
- (Italy) Michael Folorunsho
- (Italy) Daniele Franceschini
- (Italy) Alessandro Gazzi
- (Italy) Luca Germoni
- (Italy) Bruno Giordano
- (Italy) Cristiano Lombardi
- (Italy) Federico Macheda
- (Italy) Lionello Manfredonia
- (Italy) Alessandro Murgia
- (Italy) Alessandro Nesta
- (Nigeria) Ogenyi Onazi
- (Italy) Simone Palombi
- (Italy) Federico Peluso
- (Italy) Giampiero Pinzi
- (Italy) Marco Pisano
- (Italy) Daniele Portanova
- (Italy) Manolo Portanova
- (Italy) Flavio Roma
- (Italy) Antonio Rozzi
- (Italy) Aleandro Rosi
- (Italy) Alessandro Rossi (footballer)
- (Italy) Gianluca Scamacca
- (Italy) Stefano Sorrentino
- (Italy) Mauro Tassotti
- (Italy) Alessandro Tuia
- (Italy) Giuseppe Wilson
- (Romania) Cătălin Țîră
- (Senegal) Keita Baldé
- (Spain) Mamadou Tounkara
- (Venezuela) Alessandro Milani

== See also ==
- SS Lazio
- Lazio Women
- Lazio (Futsal)
