= Lys Gomis =

Senegalese footballer

Personal information
- Date of birth: 6 October 1989 (age 37)
- Place of birth: Cuneo, Italy
- Height: 1.86 m (6 ft 1 in)
- Position: Goalkeeper

Team information
- Current team: PDHAE
- Number: 1

Youth career
- Cuneo
- Torino

Senior career*
Years	Team	Apps	(Gls)
2007–2016	Torino	2	(0)
2008–2009	→ SPAL (loan)	0	(0)
2010–2011	→ Casale (loan)	14	(0)
2013	→ Ascoli (loan)	6	(0)
2014–2015	→ Trapani (loan)	29	(0)
2015–2016	→ Frosinone (loan)	0	(0)
2016	→ Poli Timișoara (loan)	1	(0)
2016–2017	Lecce	11	(0)
2017	→ Paganese (loan)	1	(0)
2017–2018	Paganese	29	(0)
2018–2019	Teramo	6	(0)
2021–2022	Busca Calcio 1920		
2023–	PDHAE	3	(0)

International career^{‡}
2014–2015	Senegal	4	(0)
- * Club domestic league appearances and goals as of 24 September 2023 ‡ National team caps and goals as of 31 January 2017

Lys Gomis (born 6 October 1989) is a footballer who plays as a goalkeeper for Italian Serie D club PDHAE. Born in Italy, he played for the Senegal national team.

== Club career ==
=== Torino and loans ===
Gomis began his playing career in Turin, for Torino F.C. In Turin, after a series of loans, he made his debut in Serie B against Albinoleffe. On 28 November 2012 he made his debut in the Coppa Italia against Siena, ending 2–0 in favour of the Tuscans.

On 31 January 2013, he was loaned to Ascoli for 6 months. On 6 March 2013, he made his debut with the bianconeri, during a match against Cesena, won 2–1 by Ascoli. At the end of season collected 6 appearances, conceding 9 goals.

Gomis returned to Torino in 2013–14. On 30 November 2013, he debuted in Serie A, substituting Daniele Padelli in the 52nd minute, against Genoa (1–1). It would remain his only appearance of the season.

On 4 July 2014, he was officially transferred on loan to Trapani in Serie B. On 4 October 2014, he made his official debut against Latina, won 1–0 by Trapani. In all he played 29 games and finished 5th in the Top 15 of the goalkeepers in Serie B according to a list compiled by the Lega Serie B.

=== Lecce ===
On 9 July 2016, he moved outright to Lega Pro side Lecce, with whom he signed a one-year contract. He played 11 games for the giallorossi side and then moved to Paganese on 31 January 2017.

=== Later years, retirement, return ===
In 2021, after almost two years of inactivity following an injury while at Teramo, he confirmed his retirement from active football, while introducing also a new goalkeeping coaching school founded by him.

He returned to playing in the 2023–24 Serie D season for PDHAE.

== International career ==
Gomis was called up by Senegal for a friendly match against Mali on 5 March 2014, ending 1–1.

== Personal life ==
Gomis is son of Senegalese immigrants in Italy residing in Cuneo and formally obtained Italian citizenship on 11 July 2012. He is of Bissau-Guinean descent through his maternal family.

He has two younger brothers that are also goalkeepers: Alfred and Maurice, both of whom developed with Torino.
