= Italy national under-21 football B team =

National association football team

- Association: Lega B (part of Italian Football Federation)
- Head coach: Massimo Piscedda
First colours	Second colours

The Italy national under-21 football B team is the Italy national football team that represents Serie B at competitions and is controlled by the Lega B. Due to sponsorship reasons, the team was credited as Under-21 Serie B TIM until 2010.

They are the B team and feeder team of Italy national under-21 football team, which occasionally plays against other national under-21 teams. Unlike the main team, the U21 Serie B selects players from Serie B only and was controlled by Lega Calcio (later Lega B) instead of Italian Football Federation (FIGC).

The team also plays against football clubs, Under-20 Lega Pro (selected players from Lega Pro), Serie B Foreigners Best XI, The Football League under-21 team (in 2006) and internal friendlies, which the team split into blue and white team and against each other.

== Recent fixture ==
Only matches played against national teams were listed.

- 28 November 2012 (Russia) Russian First League Selection 0-0 draw
- 22 October 2012 Malta Selection 5-0
- 15 November 2011 (Russia) Russian First League Selection 2-1 won
- 25 October 2011 (Serbia) Serbian First League Selection 1-0 won
- 30 March 2011 (Serbia) Serbian First League Selection 2-0 won
- 6 February 2006: Cape Verde (result unknown)
- 17 March 2005: Bosnia and Herzegovina 3-2 won
- 30 March 2004: Belgium 3-2 won
- 12 February 2003: Belgium 2–1 won
- 26 January 2002: Romania 0-0 draw

== Players ==
The team had same age limit as the Italy U21 team. For 2014–2015 season, players born on or after 1 January 1992 are eligible to play. A feeder team of U21 team, some players were called up to U21 Serie B team before making their débuts for Italy U21.

The teams consist of players loaned to Serie B from Serie A clubs, youth products of Serie B and young talents signed by Serie B clubs from Lega Pro. Some players are scouted by Serie A clubs after good performances in Serie B.

== Notable players ==
Players who won full caps or received a call-up for Italy senior team

- Andrea Barzagli (b. 1981)
- Salvatore Bocchetti (b. 1986)
- Leonardo Bonucci (b. 1987)
- Mattia Cassani (b. 1983)
- Andrea Esposito (b. 1986)
- Daniele Gastaldello (b. 1983)
- Christian Maggio (b. 1982)
- Cristian Molinaro (b. 1983)
- Simone Pepe (b. 1983)
- Giacomo Bonaventura (b. 1989)

== See also ==
- Italy national football C team
