= Tonica =

Tonica may refer to:

- Tonica, Illinois, village in LaSalle County, Illinois, United States
- Tonica (moth), genus of moths of the family Depressariidae
- Variant spelling of Tunica people, Native American tribes in the Mississippi River Valley
- Daniel Tonica (born 2007), Moldovan footballer
