= Mario Cognigni =

Mario Cognigni (born 8 August 1958 in Civitanova Marche) is an Italian sports director and the executive chairman of Italian football club ACF Fiorentina.

== Career ==
Since 1985, Cognigni has worked at an accounting firm based in Civitanova Marche. He now works with the Della Valle Group, providing fiscal and administrative advice.

In September 2006, he was elected as vice-chairman of the board of directors of Fiorentina. On 24 September 2009, following the resignation of Andrea Della Valle, he assumed the actual role of chairman of the organisation, as the chairman position was remained vacant. In 2012 Cognigni formally became the chairman of the board of directors, and then executive chairman in 2015.

On 24 July 2014, he became the advisor of the Serie A.
