= Astin Mbaye =

American soccer player (born 2009)

Personal information
- Full name: Astin Mohammet Zaehb Mbaye
- Date of birth: March 5, 2009 (age 17)
- Place of birth: New York City, United States
- Position: Defender

Team information
- Current team: AC Milan U19

Youth career
- Cedar Stars Rush
- –2025: New York Red Bulls
- 2025–: AC Milan

International career^{‡}
Years	Team	Apps	(Gls)
2023–2024	United States U15	6	(1)
2025–	United States U17	8	(1)
- ‡ National team caps and goals as of 10 June 2026

Astin Mohammet Zaehb Mbaye (born March 5, 2009) is an American soccer player who plays as a defender for the under-19 team (Campionato Primavera 1) of Serie A club AC Milan. He is an American youth international.

== Early life ==
Mbaye was born on March 5, 2009, in New York City, United States, and is of Senegalese descent through his father. Growing up in New Jersey, United States, he has regarded Brazil international Thiago Silva as his football idol.

== Club career ==
As a youth player, Mbaye joined the youth academy of American side Cedar Stars Rush. Subsequently, he joined the youth academy of American Major League Soccer side New York Red Bulls.

In 2025, he joined the youth academy of Serie A side AC Milan, with the intention for him to develop further and eventually progress with the reserve team Milan Futuro, signing his first professional contract.

Italian news website Calcio Mercato wrote in 2025 that he "is one of the young prospects who is talked about most in the [United] States".

== International career ==
Mbaye holds dual American and Senegalese citizenship, making him eligible to represent either nation. He is a United States youth international and has played for the United States boys' national under-15 soccer team. During the winter of 2023, he played for the United States boys' national under-15 soccer team at the UEFA Under-16 Development Tournament.

He was called-up with the United States men's national under-17 soccer team by head coach Gonzalo Segares for the friendly match against the Portugal national under-17 football team on 14 October 2025, which he started featuring full-time and scored the first goal of a 3–2 win for his team. Mbaye was called-up with the U17s for the 2026 FIFA U-17 World Cup in Qatar, by head coach Alex Aldaz, but later on 12 November 2026, the United States withdrew from the competition due to security concerns in the Middle East.
