= Garavaglia =

Garavaglia is a surname. Notable people with the surname include:

- Adele Garavaglia (1869–1944), Italian stage and film actress
- Carlo Garavaglia (born 1952), Italian association football manager
- Giovita Garavaglia (1790–1835), Italian engraver
- Jan Garavaglia (born 1956), American medical examiner
- Jon Garavaglia (born 1974), American basketball player
- Marco Garavaglia (born 1986), Italian ice dancer
- Maria Pia Garavaglia (born 1947), Italian politician
- Mario Garavaglia (born 1937), Argentine physicist
- Massimo Garavaglia (born 1968), Italian politician
