= Austria national under-17 football team =

National association football team

Austria U-17
- Association: Austrian Football Association
- Confederation: UEFA (Europe)
- Head coach: Franz Ponweiser
- FIFA code: AUT

World Cup
- Appearances: 3 (first in 1997)
- Best result: (silver) Runners-up (2025)

European Championship
- Appearances: 7 (first in 2003)
- Best result: (bronze) Third place (2003)

The Austria national under-17 football team represents Austria in international football at this age level and is controlled by the Austrian Football Association, the governing body for football in that nation.

== Competitive record ==
=== FIFA U-17 World Cup ===
Year	Round	Pld	W	D	L	GS	GA
(China) 1985	Did not qualify						
(Canada) 1987	Did not qualify						
(Scotland) 1989	Did not qualify						
(Italy) 1991	Did not qualify						
(Japan) 1993	Did not qualify						
(Ecuador) 1995	Did not qualify						
(Egypt) 1997	Group stage	3	0	0	3	1	14
(New Zealand) 1999	Did not qualify						
(Trinidad and Tobago) 2001	Did not qualify						
(Finland) 2003	Did not qualify						
(Peru) 2005	Did not qualify						
(South Korea) 2007	Did not qualify						
(Nigeria) 2009	Did not qualify						
(Mexico) 2011	Did not qualify						
(United Arab Emirates) 2013	Group stage	3	0	1	2	4	6
(Chile) 2015	Did not qualify						
(India) 2017	Did not qualify						
(Brazil) 2019	Did not qualify						
(Indonesia) 2023	Did not qualify						
(Qatar) 2025	Runners-up	8	7	0	1	17	2
(Qatar) 2026	Did not qualify						
(Qatar) 2027	To be determined						
(Qatar) 2028	To be determined						
(Qatar) 2029	To be determined						
Total	3/24	14	7	1	6	22	22

=== UEFA European Under-17 Championship ===
Year	Round	Pld	W	D	L	GS	GA
(Denmark) 2002	Did not qualify						
(Portugal) 2003	Third place	5	3	0	2	6	6
(France) 2004	Group stage	3	1	1	1	2	2
(Italy) 2005	Did not qualify						
(Luxembourg) 2006	Did not qualify						
(Belgium) 2007	Did not qualify						
(Turkey) 2008	Did not qualify						
(Germany) 2009	Did not qualify						
(Liechtenstein) 2010	Did not qualify						
(Serbia) 2011	Did not qualify						
(Slovenia) 2012	Did not qualify						
(Slovakia) 2013	Group stage	3	1	1	1	3	3
(Malta) 2014	Did not qualify						
(Bulgaria) 2015	Group stage	3	0	2	1	2	3
(Azerbaijan) 2016	Quarterfinals	4	2	0	2	4	9
(Croatia) 2017	Did not qualify						
(England) 2018	Did not qualify						
(Republic of Ireland) 2019	Group stage	3	0	0	3	2	8
(Israel) 2022	Did not qualify						
(Hungary) 2023	Did not qualify						
(Cyprus) 2024	Quarterfinals	4	2	1	1	8	2
(Albania) 2025	Did not qualify						
(Estonia) 2026	Did not qualify						
(Latvia) 2027	Did not qualify						
(Lithuania) 2028	To be determined						
(Moldova) 2029	To be determined						
Total	7/23	25	9	5	11	27	33

== Players ==
=== Current squad ===
The following players were called up for the most recent 2026 UEFA European Under-17 Championship qualification matches.

No.	Pos.	Player	Date of birth (age)	Club
1	GK	Teo Hupfauf	16 January 2010 (age 16)	(Austrian Football Association) Red Bull Salzburg
21	GK	Philip Hedl	13 July 2009 (age 17)	(Austrian Football Association) Rapid Wien
2	DF	Alessandro Goiginger	11 January 2009 (age 17)	(Austrian Football Association) SV Ried
3	DF	Elias Mitterbauer	3 September 2009 (age 17)	(Austrian Football Association) Red Bull Salzburg
4	DF	Jan Karner (captain)	13 February 2009 (age 17)	(Austrian Football Association) Red Bull Salzburg
15	DF	Dino Kurbegović	5 July 2009 (age 17)	(Italian Football Federation) AC Milan
5	DF	Lukas Posch	21 May 2009 (age 17)	(Austrian Football Association) Rapid Wien
16	DF	Quoc Khai Nguyen	16 February 2009 (age 17)	(Austrian Football Association) Red Bull Salzburg
18	DF	Bernhard Swozil	23 September 2009 (age 17)	(Austrian Football Association) Red Bull Salzburg
6	MF	Stefan Petrovic	27 November 2009 (age 16)	(Austrian Football Association) Rapid Wien
14	MF	Filip Aleksić	10 June 2009 (age 17)	(Austrian Football Association) Red Bull Salzburg
7	MF	Bruno Jerabek	30 September 2009 (age 17)	(Austrian Football Association) Austria Wien
8	MF	Noah Ebner	6 March 2009 (age 17)	(German Football Association) FC Augsburg
20	MF	Matteo Marić	24 February 2010 (age 16)	(Austrian Football Association) Red Bull Salzburg
17	FW	Amar Selimović	8 January 2009 (age 17)	(German Football Association) FC Augsburg
13	FW	Jonas Peinhart	16 February 2009 (age 17)	(Austrian Football Association) Sturm Graz
9	FW	Nico Berger	31 July 2009 (age 17)	(Austrian Football Association) Red Bull Salzburg
10	FW	Fabio Ebner	3 August 2009 (age 17)	(German Football Association) FC Augsburg
11	FW	Luca Mijatovic	9 January 2009 (age 17)	(German Football Association) 1.FC Köln
19	FW	Joseph M'Bock	17 April 2009 (age 17)	(Austrian Football Association) Red Bull Salzburg

== Head-to-head record ==
The following table shows Austria's head-to-head record in the FIFA U-17 World Cup.

Opponent	Pld	W	D	L	GF	GA	GD	Win %
Argentina	1	0	0	1	2	3	−1	0.00
Brazil	1	0	0	1	0	7	−7	0.00
Canada	1	0	1	0	2	2	+0	0.00
England	1	1	0	0	4	0	+4	100.00
Iran	1	0	0	1	0	1	−1	0.00
Japan					—			
Mali	1	1	0	0	3	0	+3	100.00
New Zealand	1	1	0	0	4	1	+3	100.00
Oman	1	0	0	1	1	3	−2	0.00
Saudi Arabia	1	1	0	0	1	0	+1	100.00
Tunisia	1	1	0	0	2	0	+2	100.00
United States	1	0	0	1	0	4	−4	0.00
Total	11	5	1	5	19	21	−2	45.45

== See also ==
- Austria men's national football team
- Austria women's national under-17 football team
