= Daniel Tonica =

Moldovan footballer

Personal information
- Date of birth: 31 July 2007 (age 19)
- Place of birth: Moldova
- Position: Centre-back

Team information
- Current team: Torino U20
- Number: 4

Youth career
- 2021–2026: Legnago Salus
- 2026–: Torino

Senior career*
Years	Team	Apps	(Gls)
2025–2026	Legnago Salus	17	(0)

International career^{‡}
2024	Moldova U17	4	(0)
2024	Moldova U18	4	(0)
2025	Moldova U19	9	(2)
2026–	Moldova	1	(0)
2026–	Moldova U21	1	(0)
- * Club domestic league appearances and goals as of 22:00, 16 November 2025 (UTC) ‡ National team caps and goals as of 4 June 2026

Daniel Tonica (born 31 July 2007) is a Moldovan professional footballer who plays as a centre-back for the under-20 team (Campionato Primavera 1) of Serie A club Torino and the Moldova national under-21 team.

== Early life ==
Tonica was born in Moldova, and holds dual Moldovan and Romanian citizenship. He moved to Italy in 2021, and can speak Italian.

== Club career ==
A youth product of Legnago Salus, he was promoted to their senior team in Serie D on 18 July 2025. On 10 January 2026, he transferred to Torino FC on a contract until 2029.

== International career ==
Tonica is a youth international for Moldova, and captained their Moldova U19s. He was called up to the senior Moldova national team for a set of friendlies in March 2026. He debuted with Moldova as a substitute in a friendly 2–0 loss to Lithuania on 25 March 2026.
