= Bruno Umile =

Italian footballer (born 2003)

Personal information
- Date of birth: 6 February 2003 (age 23)
- Place of birth: Naples, Italy
- Height: 1.75 m (5 ft 9 in)
- Position: Forward

Team information
- Current team: Portici

Youth career
- –2016: Internapoli
- 2016–2021: Napoli
- 2021–2022: Benevento

Senior career*
Years	Team	Apps	(Gls)
2022–2023	Benevento	1	(0)
2022–2023	→ Sambenedettese (loan)	15	(0)
2023	→ Angri (loan)	14	(2)
2023–	Portici	6	(0)

International career^{‡}
2018	Italy U15	1	(0)
2019	Italy U16	3	(0)
- * Club domestic league appearances and goals as of 20 December 2023 ‡ National team caps and goals as of 8 April 2019

Bruno Umile (born 6 February 2003) is an Italian footballer who plays as a forward for Serie D club Portici.

== Club career ==
Umile made his Serie B debut for Benevento on 13 January 2022 in a game against Monza.

== International career ==
Umile was first called up to represent his country in 2018 for Under-15 friendlies. In the next year, he was called up to the Under-16 squad.
