= Sebastián Gamarra =

Bolivian footballer (born 1997)

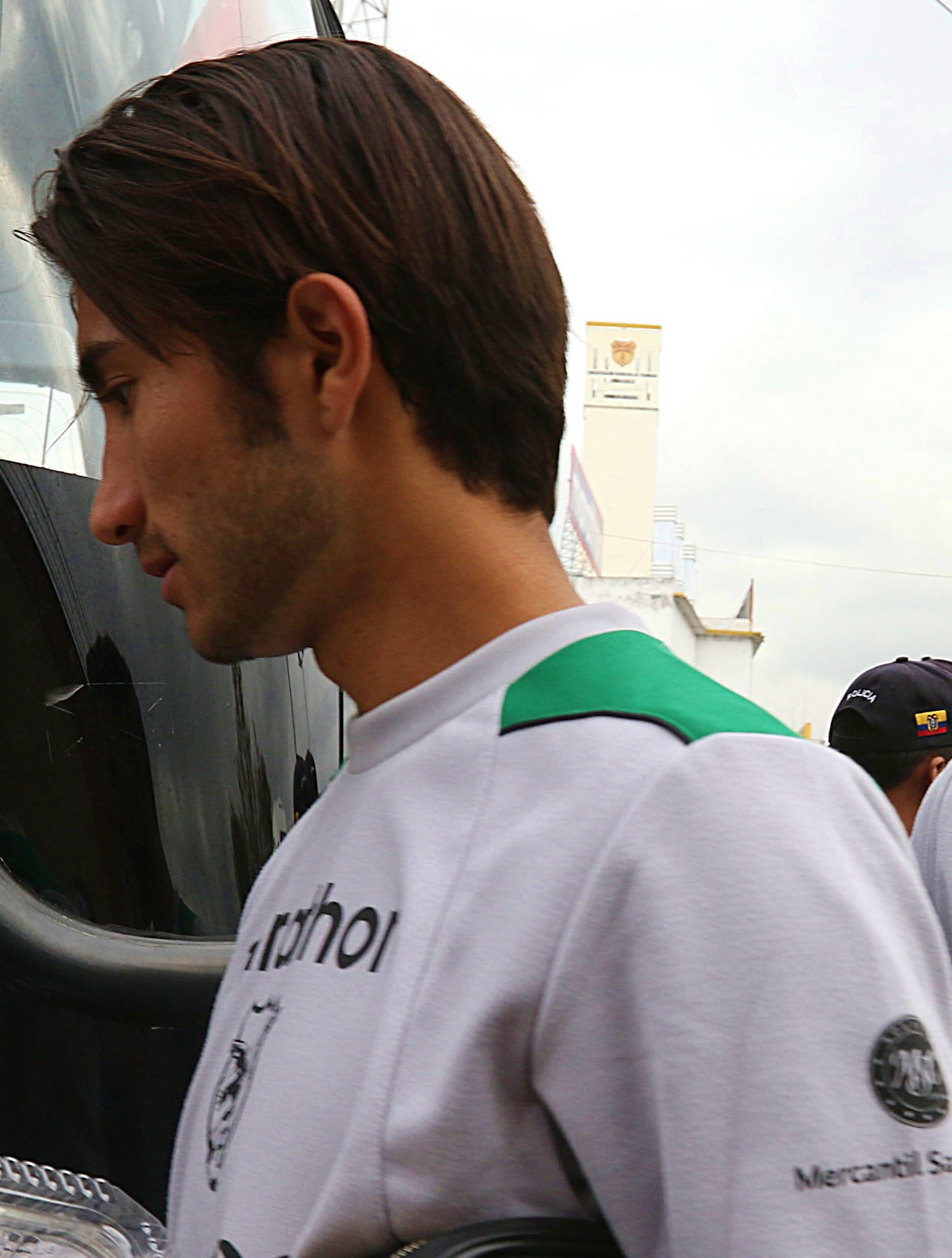
- Gamarra in 2015

Personal information
- Full name: Sebastián Gamarra Ruiz
- Date of birth: 15 January 1997 (age 29)
- Place of birth: Tarija, Bolivia
- Height: 1.78 m (5 ft 10 in)
- Position: Midfielder

Youth career
- 2009–2014: Brescia
- 2014–2016: AC Milan

Senior career*
Years	Team	Apps	(Gls)
2016–2018	FeralpiSalò	9	(0)
2019	Pisa	3	(0)
2019–2021	Oriente Petrolero	12	(1)
2021–2022	Ciclón	4	(0)
2023–	Ciudad Nueva Santa Cruz	?	(?)

International career^{‡}
2015	Bolivia	1	(0)
- * Club domestic league appearances and goals as of 1 December 2022 ‡ National team caps and goals as of 6 June 2015

Sebastián Gamarra (born 15 January 1997) is a Bolivian professional footballer who once played as a midfielder for the Bolivia national team.

== Club career ==
At a young age his family moved to Santa Cruz de la Sierra where he attended the prestigious Tahuichi Football Academy. During a youth championship in Brazil, Gamarra was spotted by a Brescia talent scout and he signed for the Italian team shortly after. Among his achievements with Brescia he won the Gothia Cup in 2010.

On 7 July 2016, he moved to FeralpiSalò.

On 10 January 2019 was signed by Pisa.

On 30 July 2019, he returned to Bolivia, signing with Oriente Petrolero.

== International career ==
Gamarra was selected by the Bolivia national football team manager Mauricio Soria to join the squad for the 2015 Copa America. He made his international debut on 6 June 2015 during a friendly match against Argentina played in San Juan that ended in a 0–5 loss in preparation for the Conmebol tournament.
