= Supercoppa Primavera =

- Organiser(s): Lega Serie A
- Founded: 2004
- Teams: 2
- Current champions: Atalanta (3 titles)
- Most championships: Juventus; Fiorentina; Roma; Atalanta (3 titles)

The Supercoppa Primavera is an Italian youth teams football match played by the winners of the Campionato Primavera championship and the winners of the Coppa Italia Primavera at the beginning of the season.

The competition has been held since 2004.

== Winners ==
Season	Winner	Score	Runner-up	Venue
2004	Lecce	2–2 (a.e.t.) (4–2 pen.)	Juventus	Stadio Via del mare, Lecce
2005	Lecce	2–1	Roma	Centro Sportivo di Trigoria, Rome
2006	Juventus	5–1	Inter	Centro Sportivo 'Chisola', Vinovo
2007	Juventus	2–0	Inter	Centro sportivo 'Interello - Giacinto Facchetti', Milan
2008	Sampdoria	2–2 (a.e.t.) (5–3 pen.)	Atalanta	Stadio La Sciorba, Genoa
2009	Genoa	2–2 (a.e.t.) (5–4 pen.)	Palermo	Stadio Renzo Barbera, Palermo
2010	Genoa	5–0	Milan	Stadio Luigi Ferraris, Genoa
2011	Fiorentina	3–2	Roma	Stadio Olimpico, Rome
2012	Roma	2–1	Inter	Stadio Carlo Speroni, Busto Arsizio
2013	Juventus	2–1	Lazio	Stadio Olimpico, Rome
2014	Lazio	1–0	Chievo	Stadio Marcantonio Bentegodi, Verona
2015	Torino	2–1 (a.e.t.)	Lazio	Stadio Olimpico Grande Torino, Turin
2016	Roma	4–0	Inter	Stadio Olimpico, Rome
2017	Inter	2–1 (a.e.t.)	Roma	Stadio Giuseppe Meazza, Milan
2018	Torino	2–2 (a.e.t.) (4–2 pen.)	Inter	Stadio Ernesto Breda, Sesto San Giovanni
2019	Atalanta	2–1	Fiorentina	Stadio Atleti Azzurri d'Italia, Bergamo
2020	Atalanta	3–1	Fiorentina	Stadio Atleti Azzurri d'Italia, Bergamo
2021	Fiorentina	3–3 (a.e.t.) (4–3 pen.)	Empoli	Stadio Carlo Castellani, Empoli
2022	Fiorentina	2–1	Inter	Stadio Brianteo, Monza
2023	Roma	1–0	Lecce	Stadio Via del mare, Lecce
2024	Sassuolo	2–0	Fiorentina	Mapei Stadium – Città del Tricolore, Reggio Emilia
2025	Inter	2–2 (5–3 pen.)	Cagliari	Arena Civica, Milan
2026	Atalanta	4–3	Fiorentina	Arena Civica, Milan

== Performance by club ==
Club	Winners	Runners-up	Winning years	Runners-up years
Fiorentina	3	4	2011, 2021, 2022	2019, 2020, 2024, 2026
Roma	3	3	2012, 2016, 2023	2005, 2011, 2017
Juventus	3	1	2006, 2007, 2013	2004
Atalanta	3	1	2019, 2020, 2026	2008
Inter	2	6	2017, 2025	2006, 2007, 2012, 2016, 2018, 2022
Lecce	2	1	2004, 2005	2023
Genoa	2	0	2009, 2010	–
Torino	2	0	2015, 2018	–
Lazio	1	2	2014	2013, 2015
Sampdoria	1	0	2008	–
Sassuolo	1	0	2024	–
Palermo	0	1	–	2009
Milan	0	1	–	2010
Chievo	0	1	–	2014
Empoli	0	1	–	2021
Cagliari	0	1	–	2025

== See also ==
- Campionato Nazionale Primavera
- Coppa Italia Primavera
