= Dino Kurbegović =

Austrian footballer (born 2009)

Personal information
- Date of birth: 5 July 2009 (age 17)
- Place of birth: Sanski Most, Bosnia and Herzegovina
- Position: Centre-back

Team information
- Current team: Milan Futuro

Youth career
- NK Podgrmeč
- 2022–2025: Wolfsberger
- 2025–: AC Milan

Senior career*
Years	Team	Apps	(Gls)
2026–	Milan Futuro (res.)	1	(0)

International career^{‡}
2024–2025	Austria U16	4	(0)
2026–	Austria U17	3	(0)
2026–	Austria U18	3	(0)
- * Club domestic league appearances and goals as of 26 April 2026 ‡ National team caps and goals as of 27 September 2026

Dino Kurbegović (born 5 July 2009) is a professional footballer who plays as a centre-back for Serie D club Milan Futuro, the reserve team of Serie A club AC Milan. Born in Bosnia and Herzegovina, he is an Austrian youth international.

== Club career ==
Kurbegović was born in Sanski Most, Bosnia and Herzegovina. He began his youth career with his hometown club NK Podgrmeč, later joining the youth academy of Austrian side Wolfsberger in 2022.

On 18 August 2025, Kurbegović joined the youth academy of Italian side AC Milan, with projection for the newly created reserve team Milan Futuro.

He made his professional debut with Milan Futuro, during the 2025–26 season, on 26 February 2026, substituting Matteo Pagliei at the second half of a 3–1 away win Serie D match against Castellanzese.

== International career ==
Born in Bosnia and Herzegovina, he holds dual Bosnian and Austrian citizenship, having represented Austria at the under-16 and under-17 levels.

== Career statistics ==
As of match played 26 April 2026

Appearances and goals by club, season and competition
Club	Season	League			Cup		Continental		Other		Total	
Club	Season	Division	Apps	Goals	Apps	Goals	Apps	Goals	Apps	Goals	Apps	Goals
Milan Futuro	2025–26	Serie D	1	0	—		—		—		1	0
Milan Futuro	Total		1	0	0	0	—		0	0	1	0
Career total			1	0	0	0	0	0	0	0	1	0
