= FC Chiasso =

Association football club in Switzerland

Chiasso
- Full name: Football Club Chiasso
- Founded: 1905; 120 years ago
- Ground: Stadio Comunale, Chiasso
- Capacity: 11,160
- Chairman: Marco Armati
- Manager: Nicola Padula
- League: 2. Liga
- 2025–26: 2. Liga Ticino, 1st of 14 (promotion)
- Website: https://fcchiasso.com/
Home colours	Away colours

FC Chiasso is a Swiss football club based in the Italian-speaking municipality of Chiasso. It was founded in 1905. Chiasso also played in the Italian first league between 1914 and 1923. They currently play in 2. Liga, the sixth tier of Swiss football.

== History ==
Between 1927 and 1993, the club played a total of 28 seasons in the Swiss top flight. The team came second in the 1950–51 season and third the following season. It also reached the semi-finals of the Swiss Cup three times.

The public limited company FC Chiasso 2005 SA was declared bankrupt in January 2023. The youth department was not affected by this as they were organised under the umbrella of the club FC Chiasso. But the first team which had been in the race for promotion to Challenge League was excluded from Promotion League mid-season and their record expunged.

After appointing a new committee and manager, the club restarted its first team to play in the 4. Liga, the eighth tier of Swiss football for the 2023–24 season. The club managed to obtain successive promotions (4. Liga 2023-24, 3. Liga 2024-25) and now play within the 2. Liga.

== Current squad ==
As of 13 October 2025

Note: Flags indicate national team as defined under FIFA eligibility rules; some limited exceptions apply. Players may hold more than one non-FIFA nationality.

No.	Pos.	Nation	Player
2	DF	ITA	Alessandro Locorotondo
4	DF	SUI	Daniele Regazzoni
5	MF	ITA	Armend Zahaj
7	DF	ITA	Luca Tino
8	MF	ITA	Donato Disabato
10	MF	SUI	Andrea Martinelli
11	MF	ITA	Michele Foglia
13	DF	SUI	Matteo Prioni
14	MF	ITA	Gabriele Stefano Pasello
17	MF	ITA	Daniele Merolli

No.	Pos.	Nation	Player
18	DF	ITA	Alessio Zefi
19	FW	ITA	Mattia Angeretti
20	MF	ITA	Leonardo Di Silvestro
23	DF	ITA	Samuel Rossi
24	MF	SUI	Matteo Martorana
26	FW	GRE	Thomas Kate
30	DF	ITA	Gianluca Piccoli
35	GK	ITA	Simone Bertani
64	FW	RSA	Marco Giuricich
88	GK	ITA	Gianluca Baglieri
97	FW	ITA	Roberto Scaramuzza

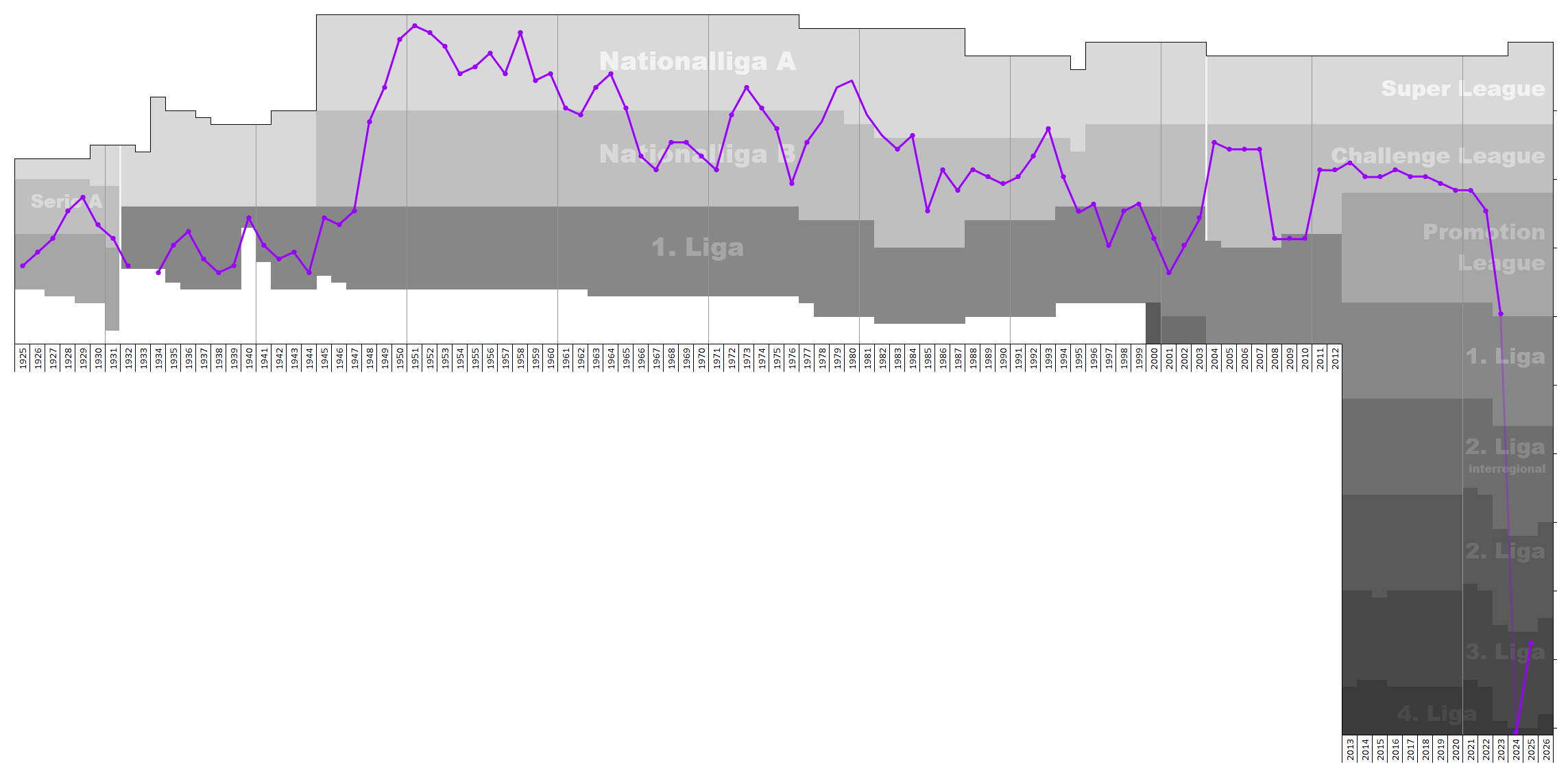
Chart of FC Chiasso table positions in the Swiss football league system

== Former players ==
- (San Marino) Matteo Nevicati

== Famous coaches ==
- (Italy) Attilio Lombardo (2006–07)
- (Poland) Ryszard Komornicki (2013)
- (Italy) Gianluca Zambrotta (2013–15)
- (Italy) Stefano Maccoppi (2019)
- (Italy) Alessandro Lupi (2019–20)
- (Italy) Baldasarre Ranieri (2020–21)
- (Italy) Andrea Vitali (2021–22)
- (Italy) Luigi Tirapelle (2022–23)
