= Torino FC Youth Sector =

Torino Primavera
- Full name: Torino Football Club Primavera
- Nicknames: il Toro (The Bull) i Granata (The Maroons)
- Founded: 1962
- Ground: Impianto Sportivo Valentino Mazzola di Orbassano
- Capacity: 4000
- Owner: Urbano Cairo
- Head coach: Francesco Baldini
- League: Campionato Primavera 1
- 2018–19: Campionato Nazionale Primavera, ?
Home colours	Away colours

Torino Football Club Primavera are the under-19 team of Italian professional football club Torino Football Club. They play in the Campionato Primavera 1. In Italy they won 9 league titles. They also participate in the Coppa Italia Primavera, which they have won 7 times and in the annual Torneo di Viareggio, an international tournament which they won 6 times.

== History ==
The Torino Primavera plays in the Campionato Nazionale Primavera in Group A, the most important youth league in Italian football. The competition is governed by the Lega Serie A and includes the youth teams of clubs participating in Serie A and Serie B. From the 2012–13 season, players from the age of 15 and players that have not turned 19 years old by the start of the season are eligible to compete. At the discretion of the League, four "over age" players are eligible to compete.

== Players ==
=== Current squad ===
As of 8 November 2026. Numbers refers to first team in Lega Serie A. For Primavera games numbers 1 to 11 are used.

Note: Flags indicate national team as defined under FIFA eligibility rules; some limited exceptions apply. Players may hold more than one non-FIFA nationality.

No.	Pos.	Nation	Player
1	GK	ITA	Francesco Cereser
2	DF	ITA	Tommaso Gatto
3	DF	GER	Tyron Alexandre
4	DF	MDA	Daniel Tonica
5	DF	ESP	Manuel Carrascosa
6	MF	SUI	Aaron Tchamda (on loan from Zürich)
7	FW	ITA	David Bonacina
8	MF	ITA	Lorenzo Ferraris
9	FW	ITA	Gabriele Falasca
10	MF	ITA	Andrea Luongo
11	FW	ITA	Filippo Conzato (on loan from Vicenza)
14	MF	ITA	Andrea Balanti
16	DF	COL	Feder Rivas
17	FW	SRB	Gianfilippo Materazzi
18	FW	ITA	Lorenzo Befani (on loan from Frosinone)
19	MF	HUN	Zalán Kugyela
21	MF	ITA	Manuel Scacchi
22	GK	ITA	Pasquale Pelicanò

No.	Pos.	Nation	Player
23	GK	ITA	Andrea Dorigo
24	MF	ITA	Carlo Mukerjee
25	DF	ITA	Mattia Zaghini
27	FW	BFA	Ousmane Banse
29	GK	SUR	Yannick Boerleider
33	DF	CRO	Luka Tomić
35	DF	ITA	Davide Gaffurini
47	MF	ITA	Dylan Scibilia
70	FW	ITA	Niccolò Rossitto (on loan from Bologna)
75	MF	BEL	Kenny Llema Olinga
76	MF	POR	Sandro Nascimento
77	FW	FRA	Kenjy Malidor
90	FW	ITA	Edoardo Martini
93	FW	FRA	Lorenzo Carvalho
97	FW	ITA	Nicola Russo
—	DF	ROU	Matei Ceuca
—	DF	ITA	Gabriele Gori

== Honours ==
- Campionato Nazionale Primavera: 9 (record)
  - 1966–67, 1967–68, 1969–70, 1976–77, 1984–85, 1987–88, 1990–91, 1991–92, 2014–15
- Coppa Italia Primavera: 8 (record)
  - 1982–83, 1983–84, 1985–86, 1987–88, 1988–89, 1989–90, 1998–99, 2017–18
- Supercoppa Primavera: 2
  - 2015, 2018
- Torneo di Viareggio: 6
  - 1984, 1985, 1987, 1989, 1995, 1998

== Youth system ==
=== History ===
- Campionato Nazionale Dante Berretti (U-18)
- Allievi Nazionali (U-17)
- Allievi B Nazionali (U-16)
- Campionato Nazionale Giovanissimi (U-15)

=== Graduates (2000–present) ===
Youth system graduates who have played for Torino, including those that are currently out on loan to other clubs.

Player	Current Club	Born	International Honours	Debut	Manager
Lys Gomis	(Italy) Trapani	(Italy) Cuneo	Full Senegal Caps	Age 20 v AlbinoLeffe, 27 May 2012	Giampiero Ventura
Abou Diop	(Italy) Torino	(Senegal) Dakar	Senegal U21	Age 19 v Roma, 19 November 2012	Giampiero Ventura
Sergiu Suciu	(Italy) Crotone	(Romania) Satu Mare	Romania U21	Age 19 v Nocerina, 24 September 2011	Giampiero Ventura
Osarimen Ebagua	(Italy) Spezia	(Nigeria) Benin City		Age 25 v Ascoli, 28 August 2011	Giampiero Ventura
Simone Benedetti	(Italy) Inter Milan	(Italy) Turin	Italy U20	Age 17 v Cittadella, 30 May 2010	Stefano Colantuono
Filippo Antonelli	(Italy) Reggiana	(Italy) Chieti		Age 31 v Reggina, 5 February 2010	Stefano Colantuono
Davide Bottone	(Italy) Torres	(Italy) Biella	Italy U21	Age 31 v Sampdoria, 7 October 2007	Walter Novellino
Angelo Ogbonna	(Italy) Juventus	(Italy) Cassino	Full Italy Caps	Age 18 v Reggina, 11 February 2007	Alberto Zaccheroni
Federico Marchetti	(Italy) Lazio	(Italy) Bassano del Grappa	Full Italy Caps	Age 21 v Treviso, 16 January 2005	Ezio Rossi
Tommaso Vailatti	(Italy) Chieri	(Italy) Venaria Reale	Italy U18	Age 18 v Sampdoria, 19 November 2004	Ezio Rossi
Giovanni Marchese	(Italy) Genoa	(Italy) Caltanissetta	Italy U21	Age 19 v Vicenza, 16 April 2004	Ezio Rossi
Andrea Mantovani	(Italy) Bologna	(Italy) Turin	Italy U21	Age 19 v Como, 19 January 2003	Ezio Rossi
Ronaldo Vanin	(Italy) Parma	(Brazil) Marília		Age 20 v Empoli, 6 October 2002	Giancarlo Camolese
Federico Balzaretti	(Italy) Roma	(Italy) Turin	Full Italy Caps	Age 20 v Inter Milan, 14 September 2002	Giancarlo Camolese
Daniele Martinelli	(Italy) Trapani	(Italy) Turin	Italy U20	Age 19 v Salernitana, 10 June 2001	Giancarlo Camolese
Franco Semioli	(Italy) Vicenza	(Italy) Cirié	Full Italy Caps	Age 21 v Salernitana, 10 June 2001	Giancarlo Camolese
Fabio Quagliarella	(Italy) Torino	(Italy) Castellammare di Stabia	Full Italy Caps	Age 17 v Piacenza, 14 May 2000	Emiliano Mondonico
Emanuele Calaiò	(Italy) Genoa	(Italy) Palermo	Italy U21	Age 18 v Reggina, 6 January 2000	Emiliano Mondonico

== Staff ==
As of 8 July 2026.

- Primavera
  - Head coach: Francesco Baldini
  - Assistant coach: Luciano Mularoni
  - Technical coach: Claiton
