= USD Pont Donnaz Hône Arnad Evançon =

Italian football club

PDHAE
- Full name: Unione Sportiva Dilettantistica Pont Donnaz Hône Arnad Evançon
- Nicknames: The Lions, Orange
- Founded: 2013; 13 years ago as, U.S.D. Pont Donnaz Hône Arnad; 2019; 7 years ago as, U.S.D. Pont Donnaz Hône Arnad Evançon (merged)
- Ground: Stadio Crestella, Donnas, Italy
- Capacity: 2,500
- Chairman: Giuseppe Perpignano
- Manager: Lorenzo Parisi
- League: Eccellenza Piemonte-Valle d'Aosta
- 2023–24: Serie D/A, 19th (relegated)
- Website: https://www.pdhaecalcio.it/
Home colours	Away colours

USD Pont Donnaz Hône Arnad Evançon, briefly PDHAE, is an Italian association football club, based in Pont-Saint-Martin, Aosta Valley. It currently plays in Eccellenza Piemonte-Valle d'Aosta.

== History ==
PDHAE was founded between 2013 and 2019, by merging USD Pont-Donnaz, USD Hone Arnad and GS Évançon. The club finished first in the Eccellenza Piedmont-Aosta Valley for the 2020-2021 season, earning promotion to Serie D for the first time in its history.
