= 1975 Torneo di Viareggio =

1975 Torneo Mondiale di Calcio Coppa Carnevale
27° Torneo di Viareggio

Tournament details
- Host country: Italy
- City: Viareggio
- Teams: 16

Final positions
- Champions: (Italy) Napoli
- Runners-up: (Italy) Lazio
- Third place: (Hungary) Újpest Dózsa
- Fourth place: (West Germany) Offenbach

Tournament statistics
- Matches played: 30
- Goals scored: 66 (2.2 per match)

The 1975 winners of the Torneo di Viareggio (in English, the Viareggio Tournament, officially the Viareggio Cup World Football Tournament Coppa Carnevale), the annual youth football tournament held in Viareggio, Tuscany, are listed below.

== Format ==
The 16 teams are seeded in 4 groups. Each team from a group meets the others in a single tie. The winner of each group progress to the final knockout stage.

== Participating teams ==
Italian teams

- (Italy) Cesena
- (Italy) Fiorentina
- (Italy) Juventus
- (Italy) Lazio
- (Italy) Milan
- (Italy) Napoli
- (Italy) Sampdoria
- (Italy) Varese

European teams

- (Czechoslovakia) Dukla Praha
- (England) Stoke City
- (Hungary) Újpest Dózsa
- (Socialist Federal Republic of Yugoslavia) Velež Mostar
- (Netherlands) Amsterdam
- (West Germany) Offenbach
- (Scotland) Rangers

American teams

- (United States) Burlingame

== Group stage ==
=== Group A ===
Team	Pts	Pld	W	D	L	GF	GA	GD
(Italy) Fiorentina	5	3	2	1	0	3	1	+2
(West Germany) Offenbach	4	3	1	2	0	3	2	+1
(Italy) Varese	3	3	1	1	1	3	2	+1
(Netherlands) Amsterdam	0	3	0	0	3	2	6	-4

=== Group B ===
Team	Pts	Pld	W	D	L	GF	GA	GD
(Czechoslovakia) Dukla Praha	5	3	2	1	0	5	3	+2
(Italy) Lazio	4	3	1	2	0	6	4	+2
(Italy) Sampdoria	3	3	1	1	1	3	2	+1
(England) Stoke City	0	3	0	0	3	0	4	-4

=== Group C ===
Team	Pts	Pld	W	D	L	GF	GA	GD
(Hungary) Újpest Dózsa	5	3	2	1	0	4	0	+4
(Italy) Napoli	4	3	2	0	1	2	3	-1
(Italy) Milan	2	3	0	2	1	1	2	-1
(Scotland) Rangers	1	3	0	1	2	1	2	-1

=== Group D ===
Team	Pts	Pld	W	D	L	GF	GA	GD
(Italy) Juventus	6	3	3	0	0	5	1	+3
(Italy) Cesena	4	3	2	0	1	6	1	+5
(Socialist Federal Republic of Yugoslavia) Velež Mostar	2	3	1	0	2	6	3	+3
(United States) Burlingame	0	3	0	0	3	0	12	-12

== Knockout stage ==
Quarter-finals
(Italy) Cesena	0 [?]
(Hungary) Újpesti Dózsa(pen)	0 [?]
(Italy) Juventus	1 [?]
(Italy) Napoli(pen)	1 [?]
(Czechoslovakia) Dukla Praha	1 [?]
(West Germany) Offenbach(pen)	1 [?]
(Italy) Fiorentina	0
(Italy) Lazio	1

Semi-finals
(Hungary) Újpesti Dózsa	0 [?]
(Italy) Napoli(pen)	0 [?]
(West Germany) Offenbach	1
(Italy) Lazio	2

Final
(Italy) Napoli	2
(Italy) Lazio	1
Third place
(West Germany) Offenbach	1
(Hungary) Újpesti Dózsa	4

== Champions ==
Torneo di Viareggio 1975 Champions

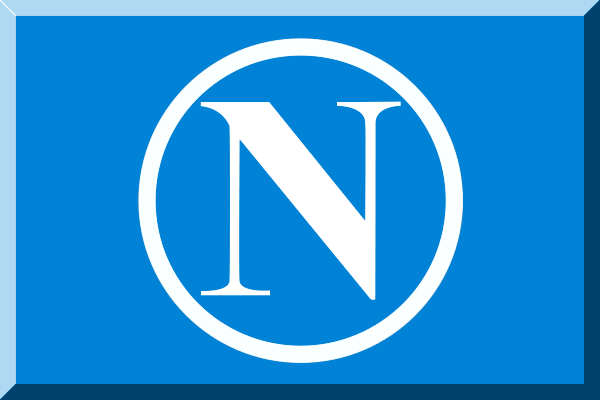

Napoli
1st time
