= 1990 Torneo di Viareggio =

1990 Torneo Mondiale di Calcio Coppa Carnevale
42° Torneo di Viareggio

Tournament details
- Host country: Italy
- City: Viareggio
- Teams: 24

Final positions
- Champions: (Italy) Cesena
- Runners-up: (Italy) Napoli
- Third place: (Italy) Fiorentina
- Fourth place: (Italy) Roma

Tournament statistics
- Matches played: 38
- Goals scored: 85 (2.24 per match)

The 1990 winners of the Torneo di Viareggio (in English, the Viareggio Tournament, officially the Viareggio Cup World Football Tournament Coppa Carnevale), the annual youth football tournament held in Viareggio, Tuscany, are listed below.

== Format ==
The 24 teams are seeded in 8 groups. Each team from a group meets the others in a single tie. The winner of each group progress to the final knockout stage. The final round matches include 30 minutes extra time and penalties to be played if the draw between teams still holds. The semifinals losing sides play consolation final. The winning teams play the final with extra time and repeat the match if the draw holds.

== Participating teams ==
Italian teams

- (Italy) Atalanta
- (Italy) Avellino
- (Italy) Bari
- (Italy) Bologna
- (Italy) Brescia
- (Italy) Cesena
- (Italy) Fiorentina
- (Italy) Inter Milan
- (Italy) Genoa
- (Italy) Juventus
- (Italy) Lazio
- (Italy) Milan
- (Italy) Napoli
- (Italy) Parma
- (Italy) Roma
- (Italy) Torino
- (Italy) Viareggio

European teams

- (England) Crystal Palace
- (Romania) Dinamo București
- (Sweden) Göteborg
- (Czechoslovakia) Slavia Prague
- (Socialist Federal Republic of Yugoslavia) Red Star Belgrade

American teams

- (Argentina) Newell's Old Boys

Asian teams

- (Japan) Yomiuri

== Group stage ==
=== Group A ===
Team	Pts	Pld	W	D	L	GF	GA	GD
(England) Crystal Palace	4	2	1	1	0	2	1	+1
(Italy) Torino	4	2	1	1	0	1	0	+1
(Italy) Brescia	0	2	0	0	2	1	3	-2

=== Group B ===
Team	Pts	Pld	W	D	L	GF	GA	GD
(Italy) Fiorentina	4	2	1	1	0	3	2	+1
(Italy) Atalanta	4	2	1	1	0	2	1	+1
(Romania) Dinamo București	0	2	0	0	2	3	5	-2

=== Group C ===
Team	Pts	Pld	W	D	L	GF	GA	GD
(Italy) Bologna	6	2	2	0	0	4	0	+4
(Italy) Lazio	3	2	1	0	1	1	3	-2
(Sweden) Göteborg	0	2	0	0	2	0	2	-2

=== Group D ===
Team	Pts	Pld	W	D	L	GF	GA	GD
(Italy) Cesena	6	2	2	0	0	2	0	+2
(Italy) Juventus	3	2	1	0	1	1	1	0
(Argentina) Newell's Old Boys	0	2	0	0	2	0	2	-2

=== Group E ===
Team	Pts	Pld	W	D	L	GF	GA	GD
(Italy) Napoli	3	2	1	0	1	2	1	+1
(Czechoslovakia) Slavia Prague	3	2	1	0	1	4	4	0
(Italy) Avellino	3	2	1	0	1	4	5	-1

=== Group F ===
Team	Pts	Pld	W	D	L	GF	GA	GD
(Italy) Milan	4	2	1	1	0	3	0	+3
(Italy) Bari	4	2	1	1	0	3	0	+3
(Italy) Viareggio	0	2	0	0	2	0	6	-6

=== Group G ===
Team	Pts	Pld	W	D	L	GF	GA	GD
(Italy) Roma	6	2	2	0	0	7	1	+6
(Italy) Genoa	3	2	1	0	1	3	4	-1
(Japan) Yomiuri	0	2	0	0	2	2	7	-5

=== Group H ===
Team	Pts	Pld	W	D	L	GF	GA	GD
(Italy) Parma	6	2	2	0	0	5	0	+5
(Italy) Inter Milan	3	2	1	0	1	3	2	+1
(Socialist Federal Republic of Yugoslavia) Red Star Belgrade	0	2	0	0	2	1	7	-6

== Knockout stage ==
Quarter-finals
(Italy) Cesena	1
(Italy) Bologna	0
(Italy) Fiorentina	3
(England) Crystal Palace	1
(Italy) Napoli (pen)	2 (5)
(Italy) Milan	2 (4)
(Italy) Roma (pen)	1 (6)
(Italy) Parma	1 (3)

Semi-finals
(Italy) Cesena (pen)	1 (5)
(Italy) Fiorentina	1 (4)
(Italy) Napoli	1
(Italy) Roma	0

Final
(Italy) Cesena	1
(Italy) Napoli	0
Third place
(Italy) Fiorentina	3
(Italy) Roma	0

== Champions ==
Torneo di Viareggio 1990 Champions

Cesena
1st time
