= Lega B =

Association football organization in Italy

- Lega Nazionale Professionisti B
- Abbreviation: LNPB
- Predecessor: Lega Nazionale Professionisti
- Founded: 7 July 2010; 16 years ago
- Headquarters: Milan
- Region served: Italy
- Products: Serie B Campionato Primavera 2
- Members: 20 clubs
- President: Mauro Balata
- Parent organization: FIGC
- Website: www.legab.it

The Lega Nazionale Professionisti B (English: Professionals National League B), commonly known as LNPB or Lega B (English: League B), is the league that runs the second tier of professional football competitions in Italy, the Serie B. It was previously known as Lega Nazionale Professionisti Serie B or just Lega Serie B.

It was founded on 7 July 2010, following a split between Serie A and Serie B clubs, which led to the dissolution of the Lega Nazionale Professionisti and creation of two new leagues, the Lega Serie A and Lega Serie B respectively. Since April 2011, Lega Serie B has joined the European Leagues.

== Competition ==
=== League ===
There are 20 clubs in Serie B since 2019, restoring the situation which existed before 2003. They were 22 during the first eight years of the Lega B. During the course of a season (generally from August to May) each club plays the others twice (a double round robin system), once at their home stadium and once at that of their opponents, for a total of 38 games. Teams receive three points for a win and one point for a draw; no points are awarded for a loss. Teams are ranked by total points; the club with the most points is crowned champion at the end of each season. If two teams are equal on points, they're ranked by points scored in head-to-head matches, then by goal difference in said games, then by goal difference in all games and then by total numbers of goals scored. If still equal, teams are deemed to occupy the same position. However, if following the application of the above-mentioned tiebreaker criteria there is still a tie for the championship, for relegation, or for qualification to the play–offs, positions will be decided by drawing of lots. The two higher placed teams, plus the winner of play-offs involving the third to sixth placed clubs, are promoted to the Serie A, while the bottom three teams from Serie A are relegated in their stead. At the lower end of the table, the three bottom clubs, along with the loser of play-offs involving the 16th and 17th placed teams, are relegated to the Serie C, with four sides from said league joining Serie B in their place.

=== Cup ===
The Lega Serie B clubs participate in the Coppa Italia, which is organized by the Lega Serie A.

=== Youth competitions ===
Youth teams of Lega Serie B clubs can play in the Campionato Primavera 2 and the Coppa Italia Primavera, which are organized by the Lega Serie B and Lega Serie A respectively. However, they can join the Campionato Primavera 1, as the Serie A teams can join the Primavera 2, under an ordinary system of promotions and relegations, and the same thing can happen with the Lega Pro’s teams playing the Campionato Primavera 3.

== List of Lega Serie B presidents ==
- 2010–2017: Andrea Abodi
- 2017–present: Mauro Balata

== Official Match Ball ==
- 2010–11: Nike T90 Tracer
- 2011–12: Nike Seitiro
- 2016–17: Puma evoPOWER 2.1
- 2017–present: Kappa Kombat
