= Carlo Garavaglia =

Italian football manager

Carlo Garavaglia (born August 4, 1952 in Milan) is an Italian association football manager, currently the manager of Sempione Half 1919.

He made his debut in Serie A on 26 November 2006, when he replaced the head coach Mario Beretta who was ill. He also managed many teams in Serie C.

== Career ==
1993-1995 Pavia

1995-1996 Solbiatese

1996-1998 Pro Patria

1998-1999 Voghera

1999-2000 Saronno

2000-2001 Novara

2006-2008 Siena (assistant manager)

2008-2009 Lecce (assistant manager)

2010- Como

2022-2023 Sempione Half 1919
