= AC Milan Youth Sector =

Italian football club

AC Milan Primavera
- Full name: Associazione Calcio Milan Primavera
- Nicknames: I Rossoneri (The Red and Blacks); Il Diavolo (The Devil)
- Founded: 1912, as AC Milan Reserves (it. Riserve)
- Ground: Puma House of Football - Centro P. Vismara
- Capacity: 1,200
- Head of Youth Sector: Vincenzo Vergine (men); Gianfranco Parma (women U10–U17); Elisabet Spina (women U19)
- Manager: Giovanni Renna
- League: Campionato Primavera 1
- 2024–25: Campionato Primavera 1, 6th of 20
- Website: www.acmilan.com
Home colours	Away colours	Third colours

Associazione Calcio Milan Youth Sector (Italian: Settore giovanile dell'Associazione Calcio Milan) is the youth system of Italian football club AC Milan. The Youth Sector is made up of various boys' and girls' squads divided by age groups. Starting from September 2023 Vincenzo Vergine is the Head of the Youth Sector, replacing Angelo Carbone.

== Primavera (under-19) ==
The Primavera team is men's under-19 squad and the highest level team within the set-up. They currently play in the top-tier Campionato Primavera 1 and the Coppa Italia Primavera, as well as representing the club in the UEFA Youth League, where they either qualify through their domestic league or the first team qualifies for the UEFA Champions League.

Milan won his first (and so far) only Championship in 1964-65 season (the third ever championship to be assigned), while he has won two national cups in 1984-85 and 2009-10 seasons.

The Primavera team trains at Milanello alongside the first team and they play the majority of their home games at the Vismara Sports Centre in Milan, which also serves as the training facility for all other teams in the set-up.

=== Current squad ===
As of 8 November 2026

Shirt numbers refer to Primavera matches. Different numbers may be assigned to players who take part in first-team or reserves team matches. Some players remain eligible for the under-18 squad also.

Note: Flags indicate national team as defined under FIFA eligibility rules; some limited exceptions apply. Players may hold more than one non-FIFA nationality.

No.	Pos.	Nation	Player
—	GK	ITA	Alessandro Bianchi
—	GK	ITA	Alessio Catalano
—	GK	PER	Paolo Doneda
—	GK	SRB	Ilja Pantelin
—	DF	ITA	Lorenzo Calvani
—	DF	ITA	Andrea Cullotta
—	DF	ITA	Lorenzo Grilli
—	DF	AUT	Dino Kurbegović
—	DF	ITA	Kevin Mazzeo
—	DF	USA	Astin Mbaye
—	DF	ITA	Mattia Mercogliano
—	DF	ALG	Yanis Messaoudi
—	DF	ITA	Luca Nolli
—	DF	ITA	Ludovico Rocca
—	DF	ROU	Christian Vechiu
—	MF	AUS	Max Anastasio
—	MF	ITA	Mattia Angelicchio
—	MF	ITA	Stefano Agresta
—	MF	FRA	Maiga-Hamadoun Cissé
—	MF	ITA	Alessandro Di Maria

No.	Pos.	Nation	Player
—	MF	ITA	Cristiano Dotta
—	MF	ITA	Matteo Geroli
—	MF	ITA	Riccardo Grassini
—	MF	SWE	Vincent Ibrahimović
—	MF	ITA	Simon La Mantia
—	MF	ITA	Thomas Martini
—	MF	ESP	Ablaye Samb
—	MF	BRA	Denzel Seedorf
—	MF	ITA	Edoardo Tartaglia
—	FW	ITA	Pietro Avogadro
—	FW	SUR	Cheveyo Balentien
—	FW	ITA	Emanuele Borsani
—	FW	ITA	Leonardo Colombo
—	FW	ITA	Ludovico Di Nella
—	FW	ROU	Francesco Domniței
—	FW	ITA	Simone Lupo
—	FW	ITA	Daniele Petrone
—	FW	ITA	Edoardo Zanaga
—	FW	ITA	Mattia Zaramella

=== Managerial history ===
- (Italy) Francesco Zagatti (1965–1970)
- (Italy) Carlo Scarpato (1970–1971)
- (Italy) Carlo Annovazzi (1977–1978)
- (Italy) Paolo Ferrario (1978–1980)
- (Italy) Italo Galbiati (1980–1982)
- (Italy) Fabio Capello (1982–1986)
- (Italy) Italo Galbiati (1986–1987)
- (Italy) Andrea Valdinoci (1987–1991)
- (Italy) Carlo Garavaglia (1991–1992)
- (Italy) Luigi Radice & Maurizio Viscidi (1992–1993)
- (Italy) Maurizio Viscidi (1993–1994)
- (Italy) Giorgio Morini (1994–1995)
- (Italy) Walter De Vecchi (1995–1996)
- (Italy) Simone Boldini (1996–1997)
- (Italy) Mauro Tassotti (1997–2002)
- (Italy) Franco Baresi (2002–2006)
- (Italy) Filippo Galli (2006–2008)
- (Italy) Alberigo Evani (2008–2009)
- (Italy) Giovanni Stroppa (2009–2011)
- (Italy) Aldo Dolcetti (2011–2013)
- (Italy) Filippo Inzaghi (2013–2014)
- (Italy) Cristian Brocchi (2014–2016)
- (Italy) Stefano Nava (2016–2017)
- (Italy) Gennaro Gattuso (2017)
- (Italy) Alessandro Lupi (2017–2018)
- (Italy) Federico Giunti (2018–2022)
- (Italy) Christian Terni (2022)
- (Italy) Ignazio Abate (2022–2024)
- (Italy) Federico Guidi (2024–2025)
- (Italy) Giovanni Renna (2025–present)

== Youth Sector ==
The Youth Sector has been responsible for producing some of the club's greatest ever players, including their top three all-time appearance makers, Paolo Maldini, Franco Baresi and Alessandro Costacurta, as well as several players, in recent years, who have managed to become regular players in Serie A. The training facilities are based at the Centro Sportivo Vismara (Vismara Sports Centre), a 57-acre (230,000 m^{2}) site in Gratosoglio, Milan, although the Primavera team train at Milanello alongside the first team.

The Youth Sector encompasses several age-group teams ranging from Under-8s up to Under-18s, divided as follows:

- Boys
  - Under-18
  - Allievi Nazionali U17
  - Allievi Nazionali U16
  - Giovanissimi Nazionali U15
  - Giovanissimi Regionali A U14
  - Giovanissimi Regionali B U13
  - Esordienti A U12
  - Esordienti B U11
  - Pulcini U10
  - Pulcini U9
  - Primi Calci U8
- Girls
  - Women's Primavera (Under-19)
  - Allieve Nazionali U17
  - Giovanissime U15
  - Esordienti U13
  - Esordienti U11
  - Pulcine U10

=== Squads ===
==== Under-18 ====
As of 1 November 2026.Shirt numbers refer to Primavera matches. For Under-18 matches numbers are issued on a match-by-match basis.

Note: Flags indicate national team as defined under FIFA eligibility rules; some limited exceptions apply. Players may hold more than one non-FIFA nationality.

No.	Pos.	Nation	Player
—	GK	ITA	Alessandro Bianchi
—	GK	ITA	Pietro Faccioli
—	GK	ITA	Alessandro Pacileo
—	GK	ITA	Edoardo Piciano
—	DF	ITA	Lorenzo Calvani
—	DF	ITA	Diego Carminati
—	DF	ITA	Luca Di Marco
—	DF	UKR	Yaroslav Kharkevych
—	DF	AUT	Dino Kurbegović
—	DF	ITA	Kevin Mazzeo
—	DF	USA	Astin Mbaye
—	DF	ITA	Mattia Mercogliano
—	DF	ALG	Yanis Messaoudi
—	DF	ITA	Luca Nolli
—	DF	ITA	Ludovico Rocca
—	DF	ITA	Giacomo Zangrillo
—	MF	ITA	Mattia Angelicchio
—	MF	KOS	Aron Babaj

No.	Pos.	Nation	Player
—	MF	ITA	Francesco Bonomi
—	MF	ITA	Emanuele Carbone
—	MF	FRA	Maiga-Hamadoun Cissé
—	MF	ITA	Alessandro Esposti
—	MF	ITA	Thomas Martini
—	MF	ITA	Pietro Piazza
—	MF	ROU	Ryan Rusu
—	MF	ESP	Ablaye Samb
—	MF	ITA	Abdou Seye
—	FW	ITA	Pietro Avogadro
—	FW	ITA	Gabriele Borsa
—	FW	ITA	Leonardo Colombo
—	FW	ITA	Donato De Nicola
—	FW	ITA	Ludovico Di Nella
—	FW	ITA	Tommaso Guglielmo
—	FW	MAR	Akram Jadid
—	FW	ITA	Simone Lupo
—	FW	ITA	Daniele Petrone

==== Allievi Nazionali U17 ====
As of 1 November 2026. Shirt numbers refer to Primavera matches. For Under-17 matches numbers are issued on a match-by-match basis.

Note: Flags indicate national team as defined under FIFA eligibility rules; some limited exceptions apply. Players may hold more than one non-FIFA nationality.

No.	Pos.	Nation	Player
—	GK	ITA	Alessandro Bogogna
—	GK	ITA	Andrea Marco Boselli
—	GK	ITA	Simone Coluzzi
—	GK	ITA	Vittorio Galimberti
—	GK	ITA	Riccardo Martello
—	GK	ITA	Carlos Maria Orsini
—	DF	ITA	Pietro Ambrosoli
—	DF	ITA	Christian Bacuzzi
—	DF	UKR	Bogdan Begmetyuk
—	DF	ITA	Andrea Bernasconi
—	DF	ITA	Federico Bettinelli
—	DF	ITA	Tommaso Colombo
—	DF	ITA	Luca Ghislini
—	DF	ITA	Antonio Manna
—	DF	ITA	Federico Marchello
—	DF	ITA	Adrien Tato
—	DF	ITA	Giuseppe Zappia

No.	Pos.	Nation	Player
—	DF	GRE	Spyridon Zormpas
—	MF	ITA	Francesco Ametrano
—	MF	ITA	Riccardo Bernabè
—	MF	ITA	Alessandro Braida
—	MF	ITA	Emanuele Carbone
—	MF	ITA	Achille Cremonesi
—	MF	ITA	Alessandro Esposti
—	MF	ITA	Pietro Piazza
—	MF	ITA	Abdou Seye
—	MF	ITA	Cristian Sorrentino
—	FW	ITA	Donato De Nicola
—	FW	UGA	Hashim Kateete
—	FW	ITA	Sebasthian Marasco
—	FW	ITA	Leonardo Rossini
—	FW	ITA	Giuseppe Santopaolo
—	FW	ITA	Achille Tebaldi

==== Allievi Nazionali U16 ====
As of 1 November 2026. Shirt numbers refer to Primavera matches. For Under-16 matches numbers are issued on a match-by-match basis.

Note: Flags indicate national team as defined under FIFA eligibility rules; some limited exceptions apply. Players may hold more than one non-FIFA nationality.

No.	Pos.	Nation	Player
—	GK	ITA	Alessandro Bogogna
—	GK	ITA	Andrea Marco Boselli
—	GK	ITA	Riccardo Martello
—	GK	ITA	Carlos Maria Orsini
—	DF	ITA	Andrea Bernasconi
—	DF	ITA	Adrien Tato
—	MF	ITA	Giuseppe Zappia
—	MF	ITA	Alessandro Braida

No.	Pos.	Nation	Player
—	MF	ITA	Emanuele Carbone
—	MF	ITA	Achille Cremonesi
—	MF	PER	Christian Vigil
—	FW	ITA	Andrea Kostyuk
—	FW	ALB	Alfons Marku
—	FW	ITA	Leonardo Rossini
—	FW	ITA	Giuseppe Santopaolo
—	FW	ITA	Achille Tebaldi

== Notable players ==
As of 17 November 2026

The following is a list of players who have played in the AC Milan youth team and represented a country at full international level. Players in bold are currently playing at AC Milan, or for another club on loan from AC Milan.

- (Bolivia) Sebastián Gamarra
- (Canada) (Portugal) Ricardo Ferreira
- (Colombia) Devis Vásquez
- (Czech Republic) Stefan Simić
- (Gabon) Catilina Aubameyang
- (Gabon) Pierre-Emerick Aubameyang
- (Gabon) Willy Aubameyang
- (Hungary) Milos Kerkez
- (Italy) Ignazio Abate
- (Italy) Demetrio Albertini
- (Italy) Luciano Alfieri
- (Italy) Carlo Annovazzi
- (Italy) Luca Antonelli
- (Italy) Davide Astori
- (Italy) Franco Baresi
- (Italy) **Davide Bartesaghi**
- (Italy) Sergio Battistini
- (Italy) Raoul Bellanova
- (Italy) Marco Borriello
- (Italy) Marco Brescianini
- (Italy) Cristian Brocchi
- (Italy) Davide Calabria
- (Italy) **Francesco Camarda**
- (Italy) Andrea Caracciolo
- (Italy) Valerio Cassani
- (Italy) Francesco Coco
- (Italy) Fulvio Collovati
- (Italy) Alessandro Costacurta
- (Italy) Bryan Cristante
- (Italy) Patrick Cutrone
- (Italy) Matteo Darmian
- (Italy) Virginio De Paoli
- (Italy) Mattia De Sciglio
- (Italy) Gianluigi Donnarumma
- (Italy) Alberico Evani
- (Italy) Pasquale Foggia
- (Italy) Alfio Fontana
- (Italy) Massimo Gobbi
- (Italy) Manuel Locatelli
- (Italy) Giovanni Lodetti
- (Italy) Massimo Maccarone
- (Italy) Aldo Maldera
- (Italy) Daniel Maldini
- (Italy) Paolo Maldini
- (Italy) Alessandro Matri
- (Italy) Fabrizio Miccoli
- (Italy) Massimo Oddo
- (Italy) Gianluca Pessotto
- (Italy) Andrea Petagna
- (Italy) Tommaso Pobega
- (Italy) Sergio Porrini
- (Italy) Luigi Radice
- (Italy) Sandro Salvadore
- (Italy) Giovanni Stroppa
- (Italy) Omero Tognon
- (Italy) Francesco Toldo
- (Italy) Giovanni Trapattoni
- (Italy) Mario Trebbi
- (Italy) Simone Verdi
- (Kazakhstan) Alexander Merkel
- (Morocco) Hachim Mastour
- (Nigeria) Ikechukwu Kalu
- (Nigeria) Nnamdi Oduamadi
- (Norway) Jørgen Strand Larsen
- (Paraguay) Hugo Cuenca
- (Poland) Michał Miśkiewicz
- (Portugal) Tiago Djaló
- (Romania) Andrei Coubiș
- (Senegal) Mohamed Sarr
- (Serbia) Jan-Carlo Simić
- (Sierra Leone) Rodney Strasser
- (Suriname) **Cheveyo Balentien**

== Honours ==
=== Primavera ===
- Campionato Primavera 1: 1
  - 1964–65
- Coppa Italia Primavera: 2
  - 1984–85, 2009–10
- Torneo di Viareggio: 9
  - 1949, 1952, 1953, 1957, 1959, 1960, 1999, 2001, 2014
- Blue Stars/FIFA Youth Cup: 2
  - 1958, 1977

=== Other teams ===
- Campionato Berretti: 7
  - 1971–72, 1981–82, 1982–83, 1984–85, 1989–90, 1993–94, 2008–09
- Campionato Allievi Nazionali: 5
  - 1994–95, 1995–96, 2002–03, 2006–07, 2010–11
- Campionato Giovanissimi Nazionali: 3
  - 1991–92, 2009–10, 2021-22
