= Campionato Primavera 2 =

Italian football youth competition

- Formerly: Campionato Nazionale Primavera
- Sport: Association football
- Founded: 2017
- Owner: Lega B
- No. of teams: 32 teams divided in two groups of 16
- Country: Italy
- Continent: UEFA
- Most recent champion: Frosinone (2024–25)
- Broadcaster: Sportitalia
- Level on pyramid: 2 (of under-20 age group)
- Promotion to: Campionato Primavera 1
- Relegation to: Campionato Primavera 3
- Domestic cup: Coppa Italia Primavera
- Website: legab.it

Campionato Primavera 2 is an Italian football youth competition. The first edition of the Campionato Primavera was held in the 1962–63 season, and a separate playoff for Serie B club took place. This tradition was discontinued after 1969. In 2017–18 season it split into two leagues: Campionato Primavera 1 and Campionato Primavera 2, organized by Lega Serie A and Lega Serie B respectively. Primavera 2 is divided in two geographical leagues, the overall winner is decided through the Supercoppa Primavera 2.

== Format ==
Primavera 2 is linked with Primavera 1 through a promotion/relegation system, but the respective senior club must be member of one of two Italian national football leagues, the Lega Serie A or the Lega Serie B: if the first team is relegated to the Serie C, the youth team is excluded by both Primavera championships and transferred to the Campionato Nazionale Dante Berretti, and eventual re-admissions of other teams take place.

Primavera 2 is divided in two leagues, for Northern and Southern Italy. The winners of these leagues are promoted to Primavera 1, while national playoffs for a third promotion take place.

== Past winners ==
=== Primavera B ===
- 1962–63: Como
- 1963–64: Udinese
- 1964–65: SPAL
- 1965–66: Padova
- 1966–67: Hellas Verona
- 1967–68: Hellas Verona
- 1968–69: Brescia

=== Primavera 2 ===
- 2017–18: Palermo
- 2018–19: Bologna
- 2019–20: No winner due to COVID-19 pandemic
- 2020–21: Pescara
- 2021–22: Cesena
- 2022–23: Lazio
- 2023–24: Cesena
- 2024–25: Frosinone
- 2025-26: Como

== See also ==
- Coppa Italia Primavera
- Serie B
- Serie A
