= Campionato Primavera 1 =

Italian football youth competition

- Organising body: Lega Serie A
- Founded: 1962
- Country: Italy
- Confederation: UEFA
- Number of clubs: 20 teams (regular season); 6 teams (playoff rounds)
- Level on pyramid: 1 (of under-20 age group)
- Relegation to: Campionato Primavera 2
- Domestic cup(s): Coppa Italia Primavera; Supercoppa Primavera
- International cup: UEFA Youth League
- Current champions: Fiorentina (4 titles)
- Most championships: Inter Milan (11 titles)
- Website: legaseriea.it

Campionato Primavera 1, known also as Campionato Primavera 1 TIM – Trofeo Giacinto Facchetti due to sponsorship and posthumous honour, is an Italian football youth competition. It was created in 2017–18 season by splitting Campionato Nazionale Primavera into two leagues: Campionato Primavera 1 and Campionato Primavera 2, and organized by Lega Nazionale Professionisti Serie A and Lega Nazionale Professionisti B respectively.

In the first season (2017–18), all 16 teams of Campionato Primavera 1 were the under-19 youth teams of Serie A clubs; it was based on a ranking system that the top 16 youth teams of the clubs of 2017–18 Serie A, qualified to Campionato Primavera 1, and the rest qualified to Campionato Primavera 2. However, the regulation also allowed the champions and runner-up of Campionato Primavera 2 would promoted to the future edition of Campionato Primavera 1; Empoli and Entella, had their youth teams finished as the losing side of the first round of the playoffs of 2016–17 season, which consisted of 14 teams, but excluded from the first edition of Campionato Primavera 1 due to the regulation.

Starting from the 2024–25 season, the competition was expanded from 18 to 20 teams, and the age limit was increased from under-19 to under-20.

== Past winners ==
- 1962–63 Juventus
- 1963–64 Inter Milan
- 1964–65 AC Milan
- 1965–66 Inter Milan
- 1966–67 Torino
- 1967–68 Torino
- 1968–69 Inter Milan
- 1969–70 Torino
- 1970–71 Fiorentina
- 1971–72 Juventus
- 1972–73 Roma
- 1973–74 Roma
- 1974–75 Brescia
- 1975–76 Lazio
- 1976–77 Torino
- 1977–78 Roma
- 1978–79 Napoli
- 1979–80 Fiorentina
- 1980–81 Udinese
- 1981–82 Cesena
- 1982–83 Fiorentina
- 1983–84 Roma
- 1984–85 Torino
- 1985–86 Cesena
- 1986–87 Lazio
- 1987–88 Torino
- 1988–89 Inter Milan
- 1989–90 Roma
- 1990–91 Torino
- 1991–92 Torino
- 1992–93 Atalanta
- 1993–94 Juventus
- 1994–95 Lazio
- 1995–96 Perugia
- 1996–97 Perugia
- 1997–98 Atalanta
- 1998–99 Empoli
- 1999–2000 Bari
- 2000–01 Lazio
- 2001–02 Inter Milan
- 2002–03 Lecce
- 2003–04 Lecce
- 2004–05 Roma
- 2005–06 Juventus
- 2006–07 Inter Milan
- 2007–08 Sampdoria
- 2008–09 Palermo
- 2009–10 Genoa
- 2010–11 Roma
- 2011–12 Inter Milan
- 2012–13 Lazio
- 2013–14 Chievo Verona
- 2014–15 Torino
- 2015–16 Roma
- 2016–17 Inter Milan
- 2017–18 Inter Milan
- 2018–19 Atalanta
- 2019–20 Atalanta
- 2020–21 Empoli
- 2021–22 Inter Milan
- 2022–23 Lecce
- 2023–24 Sassuolo
- 2024–25 Inter Milan
- 2025–26 Fiorentina

Source: Lega Serie A
