= Coppa Italia Primavera =

- Organiser(s): Lega Serie A
- Founded: 1972
- Teams: 40
- Current champions: Atalanta (4th title) (2025–26)
- Most championships: Torino, Fiorentina (8 titles)

The Coppa Italia Primavera (Italian for Spring Italian Cup) is an Italian football competition played by youth teams from Campionato Primavera. All players are under 20 of age. The first edition was held in the 1972–73 season.

Due to sponsorship reasons, the cup is officially called Primavera TIM Cup.

== Format ==
The competition is played on a home and away basis. Two elimination rounds are played by the 32 worst clubs. The eight winners are then joined by the eight best clubs in the round of 16. Quarterfinals, semifinals and the finals follow. The champions are eligible for the Supercoppa Primavera.

== Past winners ==
- 1972–73 Inter
- 1973–74 Roma
- 1974–75 Roma
- 1975–76 Inter
- 1976–77 Inter
- 1977–78 Inter
- 1978–79 Lazio
- 1979–80 Fiorentina
- 1980–81 Bari
- 1981–82 Avellino
- 1982–83 Torino
- 1983–84 Torino
- 1984–85 A.C. Milan
- 1985–86 Torino
- 1986–87 Cremonese
- 1987–88 Torino
- 1988–89 Torino
- 1989–90 Torino
- 1990–91 Avellino
- 1991–92 Empoli
- 1992–93 Udinese
- 1993–94 Roma
- 1994–95 Juventus
- 1995–96 Fiorentina
- 1996–97 Napoli
- 1997–98 Bari
- 1998–99 Torino
- 1999–2000 Atalanta
- 2000–01 Atalanta
- 2001–02 Lecce
- 2002–03 Atalanta
- 2003–04 Juventus
- 2004–05 Lecce
- 2005–06 Inter
- 2006–07 Juventus
- 2007–08 Sampdoria
- 2008–09 Genoa
- 2009–10 AC Milan
- 2010–11 Fiorentina
- 2011–12 Roma
- 2012–13 Juventus
- 2013–14 Lazio
- 2014–15 Lazio
- 2015–16 Inter
- 2016–17 Roma
- 2017–18 Torino
- 2018–19 Fiorentina
- 2019–20 Fiorentina
- 2020–21 Fiorentina
- 2021–22 Fiorentina
- 2022–23 Roma
- 2023–24 Fiorentina
- 2024–25 Cagliari
- 2025–26 Atalanta

Club	Winners	Winning years
Torino	8	1983, 1984, 1986, 1988, 1989, 1990, 1999, 2018
Fiorentina	8	1980, 1996, 2011, 2019, 2020, 2021, 2022, 2024
Roma	6	1974, 1975, 1994, 2012, 2017, 2023
Inter	6	1973, 1976, 1977, 1978, 2006, 2016
Juventus	4	1995, 2004, 2007, 2013
Atalanta	4	2000, 2001, 2003, 2026
Lazio	3	1979, 2014, 2015
Bari	2	1981, 1998
Avellino	2	1982, 1991
Milan	2	1985, 2010
Lecce	2	2002, 2005
Cremonese	1	1987
Empoli	1	1992
Udinese	1	1993
Napoli	1	1997
Sampdoria	1	2008
Genoa	1	2009
Cagliari	1	2025

== See also ==
- Campionato Primavera
- Coppa Italia
- Serie A
- Serie B
