= Lega Serie A =

Association football organization in Italy

- Lega Calcio Serie A
- Abbreviation: LNPA
- Predecessor: Lega Nazionale Professionisti
- Founded: 1 July 2010; 16 years ago
- Headquarters: Milan
- Region served: Italy
- Products: Serie A Coppa Italia; Supercoppa Italiana; Campionato Primavera 1 Coppa Italia Primavera; Supercoppa Primavera
- Members: 20 clubs
- President: Ezio Simonelli
- Parent organization: FIGC
- Website: www.legaseriea.it

The Lega Calcio Serie A (English: Serie A Football League), formerly known as Lega Nazionale Professionisti Serie A (English: Serie A Professionals National League), commonly known as Lega Serie A (English: Serie A League), is the league that runs the major professional association football competitions in Italy, most prominently the Serie A; the top division of Italian football, and the Coppa Italia; the national cup of the country.

It was founded on 1 July 2010. In the past the television rights of the Serie A clubs were sold separately, and "Serie A" had to financially support Serie B through divided part of the Serie A TV revenues to Serie B clubs. On 30 April 2009, Serie A announced a split from Serie B, when nineteen of the twenty clubs voted in favour of the move. Relegation-threatened Lecce voted against.

The league took over most of the competitions formerly held by Lega Nazionale Professionisti, namely Serie A, Coppa Italia, Supercoppa Italiana, and youth competitions Campionato Primavera 1, Coppa Italia Primavera, and Supercoppa Primavera. Serie B is now organised by the Lega B, which was founded on 7 July 2010.

== Competitions ==
=== League ===
Serie A counts a total number of 20 clubs. In each season (that starts in August, to end in following May) every club faces the others twice (double round-robin system): once in home stadium and once in the opponents one, for 38 total games (19 for each half). Teams gain 3 points for win and a point for draw: no points are gained for lost matches. Ranking is based on total points: the top-club (with the most points) is crowned Italian champion at the end of season. If two or more teams are equal on number of points, they are ranked by following criteria: head-to-head records (results and points), goal difference in these games, goal difference overall, most goals scored, draw.

The three lowest placed teams are relegated in Serie B, as three other sides (two top-teams and play-off winner) are promoted in order to replace them.

=== Cup ===
The Lega Serie A organizes the main Italian cup competition, the Coppa Italia, which is open also to all Serie B clubs and some clubs from the Serie C.

=== Super Cup ===
The Lega Serie A also organizes the Supercoppa Italiana, a yearly match between the champions of the Serie A and the winners of the Coppa Italia.

=== Youth competitions ===
Youth teams of Lega Serie A clubs play in the Campionato Primavera 1, as well as competing in their own cup competitions, such as the Coppa Italia Primavera and the Supercoppa Primavera.

== Footballs ==
Puma is the official match football of the Lega Serie A and is used by all 20 teams in league games. The same football is used in all Coppa Italia games and the Supercoppa Italiana.

== List of Lega Serie A chairmen ==
- Maurizio Beretta (2010–2017)
- Carlo Tavecchio (2017–2018; interim commissioner)
- Giovanni Malagò (2018; interim commissioner)
- Gaetano Miccicchè (2018–2019)
- Mario Cicala (2019; interim commissioner)
- Giancarlo Abete (2019–2020; interim commissioner)
- Paolo Dal Pino (2020–2022)
- Lorenzo Casini (2022–2024)
- Ezio Simonelli (2024–incumbent)

== Official Match Ball ==
- 2010–11: Nike T90 Tracer
- 2011–12: Nike Seitiro
- 2012–13: Nike Maxim
- 2013–14: Nike Incyte
- 2014–15: Nike Ordem 2
- 2015–16: Nike Ordem 3
- 2016–17: Nike Ordem 4
- 2017–18: Nike Ordem 5
- 2018–19: Nike Merlin
- 2019–20: Nike Merlin 2
- 2020–21: Nike Flight
- 2021–22: Nike Flight 2
- 2022–23: Puma Orbita Serie A 2022–23
- 2023–24: Puma Orbita Serie A 2023–24

== Sponsorship and partners ==
- Enilive (Championship title Serie A)
- Frecciarossa (Title Coppa Italia)
- EA Sports FC (Title Partner Supercoppa Italiana)
- Puma (Official ball)
- Philadelphia (Official partner)
- Iliad (Innovation & Tecnology partner)
- Bancomat (Official partner)
- Volkswagen (Official partner)
- Haier (Official partner)
- Panini (Official Stickers)
- Bazr (Official Ball Collectibles)
- Goleador (Title Partner eSerieA)
- Boglioli Milano (Official Supplier)

== Radio TV Serie A ==
Radio TV Serie A is a thematic radio station dedicated to Serie A and published by Lega Calcio Serie A. It began broadcasting on August 19, 2023, and was initially produced in partnership between Lega Calcio Serie A and RDS, before being independently managed by Lega Calcio Serie A. It broadcasts in DAB and IP mode, visible on the Lega Serie A website and app.
