= Atalanta BC Youth Sector =

Atalanta Youth Sector
- Full name: Atalanta Bergamasca Calcio Youth Sector
- Nickname: La Dea (The Goddess)
- Ground: Centro Sportivo Bortolotti, Zingonia, Italy
- Manager: Giovanni Bosi (Under-19 Primavera squad)
- League: Campionato Primavera
- Website: https://www.atalanta.it
Home colours	Away colours	Third colours

The Atalanta BC Youth Sector (Italian: Settore Giovanile) comprises the Primavera (under-19) team and the academy of Italian professional football club Atalanta BC The under-19 squad competes in the Campionato Primavera 1. The club's Primavera side has been champions of Italy four times, having last won the championship in 2019–20. The under-18 side has won the Campionato Allievi Nazionali on four occasions, most recently in the 2015–16 season.

== Primavera ==
=== Current squad ===
In bold players already capped with senior team in official matches.

As of 8 July 2026

Note: Flags indicate national team as defined under FIFA eligibility rules; some limited exceptions apply. Players may hold more than one non-FIFA nationality.

No.	Pos.	Nation	Player
4	MF	ITA	Niccolò Gariani
7	MF	ITA	Filippo Galafassi
9	FW	SUI	Dion Cakolli
12	GK	ITA	Alessandro Barbieri
14	DF	ITA	Alessandro Rinaldi
18	MF	ITA	Giuseppe Mungari
19	MF	ITA	Francesco Gasparello
21	MF	ITA	Davide Bono
26	MF	ITA	Manuel Belli
27	FW	ITA	Andrea Michieletto
29	DF	ITA	Mattia Aliprandi
30	MF	ITA	Giovanni Percassi
34	GK	ITA	Mattia Sonzogni
37	MF	ITA	Mattia Pedretti

No.	Pos.	Nation	Player
45	GK	ITA	Manuel Leto
49	FW	ITA	Andrea Frascolla
94	FW	GUI	Henry Camara
—	DF	SLO	Max Bilac
—	DF	ROU	Raul Cojocariu
—	DF	ROU	Andrei Racu
—	MF	UKR	Oleksandr Dragan
—	MF	BEL	Lyam Hoodiamont
—	FW	GHA	Yaw Asamoah Agyei
—	FW	ITA	Nicolò Baldo
—	FW	ESP	Daniel Curcio
—	FW	CRO	Vinko Kolaković
—	FW	LAT	Jegors Oligars
—	FW	ITA	Diego Perillo

=== Out on loan ===
Note: Flags indicate national team as defined under FIFA eligibility rules; some limited exceptions apply. Players may hold more than one non-FIFA nationality.

No.	Pos.	Nation	Player
—	DF	ITA	Luca Gobbo (at Renate until 30 June 2027)
—	DF	ITA	Mirko Personeni (at Cavese until 30 June 2027)
—	DF	ITA	Lorenzo Zaffalon (at Ternana until 30 June 2027)
—	DF	ITA	Matteo Daniele (at Venezia Primavera until 30 June 2027)

No.	Pos.	Nation	Player
—	DF	ITA	Sebastiano Marnati (at Flaminia Civita Castellana until 30 June 2027)
—	MF	ITA	Michele Rinaldi (at Fidelis Andria until 30 June 2027)
—	FW	ITA	Vincenzo Damiano (at Genoa Primavera until 30 June 2027)

=== Non-playing staff (under-19 squad) ===
- Director: Flavio Negrini
- Head Coach: Giovanni Bosi
- Assistant manager: Marco Zanchi
- Goalkeeping Coach: Gabriele Manini
- Fitness Coach: Emanuele Vit
  Marco Semeria
- Match analyst: Roberto Ferrari
- Team Doctor: Stefano Bondi
- Physiotherapist: Alfredo Adami
  Enrico Tassi
- Team manager: Flavio Negrini
- Оfficial accompanying manager: Maurizio De Lorenzo

== Settore Giovanile ==
=== Non-playing staff (under-18 squad) ===
- Directors: Maurizio De Lorenzo / Amelio Macetti
- Head Coach: Stefano Lorenzi
- Fitness Coach: Andrea Filippelli
- Goalkeeping Coach: Giorgio Frezzolini
- Team Doctor: Fabrizio Caroli
- Physiotherapist: Leonardo Belotti

== Youth system ==
Below the Primavera team (U19), and Berretti (U18), there are six other teams listed on the official website:

- Allievi Nazionali (U17)
- Allievi Lega Pro (U16)
- Giovanissimi Nazionali (U15)
- Giovanissimi Regionali A (U14)
- Giovanissimi Regionali B (U13)
- Giovanissimi Regionali Femminili

=== Managerial history ===
- (Italy) Valter Bonacina (2012–2017) – Primavera (under-19 coach)
- (Italy) Massimo Brambilla (2015–2017) – Allievi Nazionali (under-17 coach)
- (Italy) Massimo Brambilla (2017–2022) – Primavera (under-19 coach)
- (Italy) Marco Fioretto (2022–2023) – Primavera (under-19 coach)
- (Italy) Giovanni Bosi (2023–present) – Primavera (under-19 coach)

== Honours ==
- Campionato Nazionale Primavera
  - Champions: 1992–93, 1997–98, 2018–19, 2019–20
- Torneo Città di Arco
  - 2016, 2017
- Campionato Allievi Nazionali
  - 1991–92, 2001–02, 2004–05, 2015–16
- U-17 Supercoppa Italiana
  - 2016
- Torneo Internazionale Maggioni-Righi
  - 2017

== Notable former Primavera and youth team players ==
Many players from Atalanta's Primavera squad go on to have careers in professional football, whether at Atalanta or at other clubs. The following is a list of players who have represented their country at full international level and/or have played regularly at a high level of club football.

- (Italy) Michele Canini
- (Scotland) Richard Hughes
