= 2009 Coppa Italia final =

61st Coppa Italia final
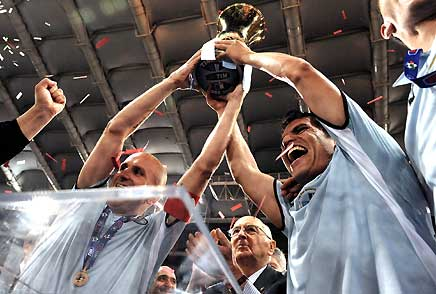
- President of Italy Giorgio Napolitano handing the trophy to Tommaso Rocchi and Cristian Ledesma
- Event: 2008–09 Coppa Italia
| Lazio | Sampdoria |
| 1 | 1 |
- After extra time Lazio won 6–5 on penalties
- Date: 13 May 2009
- Venue: Stadio Olimpico, Rome
- Referee: Roberto Rosetti
- Attendance: 68,000
- Weather: Clear; 19 °C (66 °F)

The 2009 Coppa Italia final was the final match of the 2008–09 Coppa Italia, the top cup competition in Italian football. The match was played at the Stadio Olimpico in Rome on 13 May 2009 between Lazio and Sampdoria; Lazio won 6–5 on penalties after the match ended 1–1 after extra time. Hugo Campagnaro missed his spot kick for Sampdoria and allowed Ousmane Dabo to slot home the winner for Lazio.

== Route to the final ==
| Lazio | | | Sampdoria | |
|---|---|---|---|---|
| Benevento; H 5–1 | Mauri 9'; Meghni 22'; Manfredini 54'; Pandev 57', 90' | Third Round | not played | – |
| Atalanta; H 2–0 | Ledesma 17'; Pandev 83' | Fourth Round | not played | – |
| Milan; A 2–1 (a.e.t.) | Zárate 87' (pen.); Pandev 92' | Round of 16 | Empoli; H 2–1 | Bonazzoli 31'; Fornaroli 46' |
| Torino; H 3–1 | Pandev 47'; Mauri 55'; Rocchi 91' | Quarter-finals | Udinese; H 1–1 (a.e.t.) | Pazzini 10' |
| Juventus; H 2–1 | Pandev 66'; Rocchi 78' | Semi-finals; First leg | Internazionale; H 3–0 | Cassano 9'; Pazzini 30', 41' |
| Juventus; A 2–1 | Zárate 37'; Kolarov 46' | Second leg | Internazionale; A 0–1 | |

== Pre-match ==
=== Team selection ===
Goran Pandev and Pasquale Foggia both returned to fitness for Lazio in the lead up to this match; however, they had to do without the services of their Brazilian midfielder Matuzalém, who missed out through suspension. Sampdoria welcomed back defensive duo Pietro Accardi and Stefano Lucchini, as well as Paolo Sammarco, who passed a late fitness test, to assure him of a spot in the final.

Sampdoria coach Walter Mazzarri said that the final should be played in a neutral venue, and that it would give more balance to the match.

=== Ticketing ===
Although the usual capacity of the Stadio Olimpico is over 72,000, not every single ticket has been sold. In fact, Lega Calcio decided to sell about 20,000 tickets for each club, and the remain tickets at the neutral public (even if they had been bought for the most part from Lazio fans because the final was in Rome). Lazio fans took place in "Curva Nord", while the Sampdoria ones at the opposite side. Between Lazio fans and Sampdoria fans a sector, the "Distinti Sud Est", has been left empty to leave a large space between the "Curva Sud" and the "Tribuna Tevere", due to avoid fights between fans. That space was occupied in part by children of the youth Lazio teams. At the end of the match, it has been counted about 50,000 Lazio fans and 18,000 Sampdoria fans.

=== Kits ===
Having been designated as the official "home" team, Lazio could wear their usual kit, that is the light-blue one. Nevertheless, Sampdoria could wear their home kit too, but with blue shorts instead of white ones.

== Match ==
=== Match details ===
13 May 2009
20:45 CEST

| Lazio | 1–1 (a.e.t.) | Sampdoria |
|---|---|---|
| Zárate 4' | Report | Pazzini 31' |
Penalties
| Ledesma (penalty scored); Rocchi (penalty missed); Rozehnal (penalty scored); Kolarov (penalty scored); Zárate (penalty scored); Lichtsteiner (penalty scored); Dabo (penalty scored) | 6–5 | (penalty missed) Cassano; (penalty scored) Palombo; (penalty scored) Pazzini; (penalty scored) Gastaldello; (penalty scored) Accardi; (penalty scored) Delvecchio; (penalty missed) Campagnaro |

Stadio Olimpico, Rome
Attendance: 68,000
Referee: Roberto Rosetti

| Lazio | Sampdoria |

| GK | 86 | (Uruguay) Fernando Muslera |
| RB | 2 | (Switzerland) Stephan Lichtsteiner |
| CB | 13 | (Italy) Sebastiano Siviglia | (yellow card) 54' |
| CB | 22 | (Czech Republic) David Rozehnal |
| LB | 3 | (Serbia) Aleksandar Kolarov |
| RM | 5 | (Italy) Cristian Brocchi | | (substituted off) 105' |
| CM | 24 | (Italy) Cristian Ledesma (c) |
| CM | 6 | (France) Ousmane Dabo |
| LM | 17 | (Italy) Pasquale Foggia | (yellow card) 8' | (substituted off) 80' |
| CF | 19 | (North Macedonia) Goran Pandev | | (substituted off) 73' |
| CF | 10 | (Argentina) Mauro Zárate |
Substitutes:
| GK | 1 | (Argentina) Juan Pablo Carrizo |
| DF | 32 | (Romania) Ştefan Radu |
| DF | 29 | (Italy) Lorenzo De Silvestri | | (substituted in) 105' |
| DF | 87 | (France) Modibo Diakité |
| MF | 11 | (Italy) Stefano Mauri |
| FW | 81 | (Italy) Simone Del Nero | | (substituted in) 80' |
| FW | 18 | (Italy) Tommaso Rocchi | | (substituted in) 73' |
Manager:
(Italy) Delio Rossi

| GK | 1 | (Italy) Luca Castellazzi |
| CB | 16 | (Argentina) Hugo Campagnaro |
| CB | 6 | (Italy) Stefano Lucchini | (yellow card) 26' | (substituted off) 98' |
| CB | 5 | (Italy) Pietro Accardi | (yellow card) 61' |
| DM | 21 | (Italy) Paolo Sammarco | | (substituted off) 91' |
| DM | 19 | (Italy) Daniele Franceschini | | (substituted off) 87' |
| RM | 23 | (Lithuania) Marius Stankevičius |
| LM | 46 | (Italy) Mirko Pieri |
| AM | 17 | (Italy) Angelo Palombo (c) | (yellow card) 110' |
| CF | 10 | (Italy) Giampaolo Pazzini |
| CF | 99 | (Italy) Antonio Cassano |
Substitutes:
| GK | 83 | (Italy) Antonio Mirante |
| DF | 28 | (Italy) Daniele Gastaldello | (yellow card) 112' | (substituted in) 98' |
| DF | 84 | (Italy) Andrea Raggi |
| MF | 88 | (Italy) Daniele Dessena | | (substituted in) 91' |
| MF | 20 | (Switzerland) Marco Padalino |
| MF | 40 | (Italy) Gennaro Delvecchio | (yellow card) 100' | (substituted in) 87' |
| FW | 89 | (Italy) Guido Marilungo |
Manager:
(Italy) Walter Mazzarri

== Post-match ==
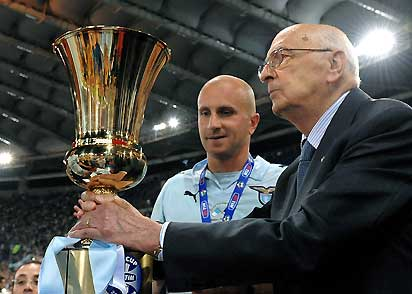
Rocchi receives the trophy form Giorgio Napolitano.

After the match, some Lazio players wore a T-shirt to joke A.S. Roma rivals with written on it Io campione, tu zero titoli (I'm a champion, you have no honours), quoting a sentence said by José Mourinho who had, earlier in the season, correctly predicted that Milan, Juventus and Roma would have completed the season with no honours.

Lazio captain, Tommaso Rocchi, has been rewarded by the President of the Italian Republic Giorgio Napolitano in front of the "Tribuna Montemario", and gave him the trophy that Rocchi lifted with the captain of that match, Cristian Ledesma.

Cristian Brocchi and Lorenzo De Silvestri dedicated the victory to Gabriele Sandri, a fan who was killed last season, and coach Delio Rossi said that the triumph was also dedicated to the fans and everyone who had made many sacrifices to get the team to the final.

After the match, a minority of Lazio fans clashed with police and tried to smash shops in Rome city centre following the win over Sampdoria, according to a statement on 14 May 2009. Police said three arrests had been made before and after the final and added that five police officers had been injured.

== See also ==
- 2008-09 UC Sampdoria season
- 2008-09 SS Lazio season
