= 2008–09 UC Sampdoria season =

Sampdoria
2008–09 season
- Chairman: Riccardo Garrone
- Manager: Walter Mazzarri
- Serie A: 13th
- Coppa Italia: Runners-up
- UEFA Cup: Round of 32
- Top goalscorer: League: Antonio Cassano (12); All: Antonio Cassano (15)
Home colours	Away colours	Third colours

The 2008–09 season was Unione Calcio Sampdoria's 53rd season in Serie A, and their 6th consecutive season in the top-flight. The club competed in Serie A and in the Coppa Italia.

== Squad ==
As of August 13, 2008 Note: Flags indicate national team as defined under FIFA eligibility rules; some limited exceptions apply. Players may hold more than one non-FIFA nationality.

No.	Pos.	Nation	Player
1	GK	(Italy) ITA	Luca Castellazzi
3	MF	(Switzerland) SUI	Reto Ziegler
5	DF	(Italy) ITA	Pietro Accardi
6	DF	(Italy) ITA	Stefano Lucchini
8	MF	(Italy) ITA	Andrea Poli (from youth team)
9	FW	(Uruguay) URU	Bruno Fornaroli
11	FW	(Italy) ITA	Claudio Bellucci
14	DF	(Argentina) ARG	Jonathan Bottinelli
16	DF	(Argentina) ARG	Hugo Campagnaro
17	MF	(Italy) ITA	Angelo Palombo
18	FW	(Italy) ITA	Emiliano Bonazzoli
19	MF	(Italy) ITA	Daniele Franceschini
20	MF	(Switzerland) SUI	Marco Padalino
21	MF	(Italy) ITA	Paolo Sammarco
23	MF	(Lithuania) LTU	Marius Stankevičius

No.	Pos.	Nation	Player
24	DF	(Switzerland) SUI	Jonathan Rossini (from youth team)
25	FW	(Italy) ITA	Mattia Mustacchio (from youth team)
27	MF	(Italy) ITA	Mirko Eramo (from youth team)
28	DF	(Italy) ITA	Daniele Gastaldello
40	MF	(Italy) ITA	Gennaro Delvecchio
46	DF	(Italy) ITA	Mirko Pieri
83	GK	(Italy) ITA	Antonio Mirante
88	MF	(Italy) ITA	Daniele Dessena
89	FW	(Italy) ITA	Guido Marilungo (from youth team)
90	GK	(Italy) ITA	Vincenzo Fiorillo (from youth team)
99	FW	(Italy) ITA	Antonio Cassano
–	GK	(Italy) ITA	Davide Negretti (from youth team)
–	GK	(Italy) ITA	Daniele Padelli

== Transfers ==
=== Summer 2008 ===
In: Note: Flags indicate national team as defined under FIFA eligibility rules; some limited exceptions apply. Players may hold more than one non-FIFA nationality.

No.	Pos.	Nation	Player
—	DF	(Italy) ITA	~~Fabrizio Cacciatore~~ (from Foligno, loan return)
23	MF	(Lithuania) LTU	Marius Stankevičius (from Brescia, €3m)
—	DF	(Italy) ITA	~~Alessandro Bastrini~~ (from Modena, loan return)
20	MF	(Switzerland) SUI	Marco Padalino (from Piacenza, €2.5m)
—	FW	(Italy) ITA	~~Francesco Virdis~~ (from Pescara, loan return)
88	MF	(Italy) ITA	Daniele Dessena (from Parma, €3m co-ownership)
—	MF	(Italy) ITA	~~Paolo Castellazzi~~ (from Pro Patria, loan return)
9	FW	(Uruguay) URU	Bruno Fornaroli (from (Uruguay) Nacional, €5m)
14	DF	(Argentina) ARG	Jonathan Bottinelli (from (Argentina) San Lorenzo, undisclosed)

Out: Note: Flags indicate national team as defined under FIFA eligibility rules; some limited exceptions apply. Players may hold more than one non-FIFA nationality.

No.	Pos.	Nation	Player
—	FW	(Italy) ITA	Christian Maggio (to Napoli, €9m)
—	MF	(Italy) ITA	Sergio Volpi (to Bologna, Free)
—	FW	(Italy) ITA	Vincenzo Montella (to Roma, loan return)
—	DF	(Italy) ITA	Cristian Zenoni (to Bologna, €1m)
—	FW	(Italy) ITA	Francesco Flachi (to Empoli, Free)
—	DF	(Italy) ITA	Gianluigi Bianco (to Empoli, co-ownership)
—	FW	(Nigeria) NGA	Ikechukwu Kalu (to (Switzerland) Bellinzona, €0.7m)

Out on loan: Note: Flags indicate national team as defined under FIFA eligibility rules; some limited exceptions apply. Players may hold more than one non-FIFA nationality.

No.	Pos.	Nation	Player
—	DF	(Italy) ITA	Fabrizio Cacciatore (to Triestina)
—	DF	(Italy) ITA	Alessandro Bastrini (to Sassuolo)
—	DF	(Cameroon) CMR	Solomon Enow (to Legnano)
—	FW	(Italy) ITA	Francesco Virdis (to Legnano)
—	DF	(Uruguay) URU	Leonardo Martín Migliónico (to Livorno)
—	DF	(Italy) ITA	Simone Ciancio (to Alessandria)
—	FW	(Italy) ITA	Stefano Scappini (to Ternana)
—	MF	(Italy) ITA	Paolo Castellazzi (to Ternana)
—	DF	(Italy) ITA	Luca Calzolaio (to Lumezzane)
—	MF	(Italy) ITA	Danilo Soddimo (to Ancona)
—	DF	(Italy) ITA	Massimo Volta (to Vicenza)

== Pre-season and friendlies ==
26 July 2008 Friendly	Monti Pallidi (Italy)	0–16	(Italy) Sampdoria
		Report	Bonazzoli 11'; Fornaroli 29'; Delvecchio 39'; Marilungo 47', 88'; Gastaldello 54'; Mustacchio 59', 63', 77'; Bonanni 75' (pen.), 80'; Ferrari 78', 82', 87', 90', 90+1'	Referee: Massimo Morgese

2 August 2008 Friendly	Sampdoria (Italy)	4–1	(Italy) Bolzano	Genoa, Italy
	Fornaroli 40'; Bonazzoli 61'; Padalino 69'; Mustacchio 78'	Report	Aiello 88'	Stadium: Stadio Luigi Ferraris; Attendance: 500 (approx.); Referee: Giovanni Fattoruso

10 August 2008 Friendly	Sporting CP (Portugal)	2–0	(Italy) Sampdoria	Lisbon, Portugal
	Derlei 25'; João Moutinho 83' (pen.)	Report		Stadium: Estádio José Alvalade; Attendance: 18,000 (approx.); Referee: Pedro Proença (Portugal)

13 August 2008 Friendly	Carrarese (Italy)	1–3	(Italy) Sampdoria	Carrara, Italy
	Vincenzi 31'	Report	Marilungo 34'; Franceschini 59'; Stankevičius 74'	Stadium: Stadio dei Marmi; Referee: Gianmattia Tasso

== Competitions ==
=== Serie A ===
==== League table ====
Pos	Team	Pld	W	D	L	GF	GA	GD	Pts
11	Atalanta	38	13	8	17	45	48	−3	47
12	Napoli	38	12	10	16	43	45	−2	46 (Note: Napoli finished ahead of Sampdoria on head-to-head points: Napoli 2–0 Sampdoria, Sampdoria 2–2 Napoli.)
13	Sampdoria	38	11	13	14	49	52	−3	46
14	Siena	38	12	8	18	33	44	−11	44
15	Catania	38	12	7	19	41	51	−10	43

Source: lega-calcio.it (in Italian)
Rules for classification: 1) points; 2) head-to-head points; 3) head-to-head goal difference; 4) head-to-head goals scored; 5) goal difference; 6) number of goals scored.

==== Results summary ====
Overall								Home						Away					
Pld	W	D	L	GF	GA	GD	Pts	W	D	L	GF	GA	GD	W	D	L	GF	GA	GD
38	11	13	14	49	52	−3	46	8	8	3	33	21	+12	3	5	11	16	31	−15

Last updated: 31 May 2009.
Source: Competitive matches

==== Results by round ====
Round	1	2	3	4	5	6	7	8	9	10	11	12	13	14	15	16	17	18	19	20	21	22	23	24	25	26	27	28	29	30	31	32	33	34	35	36	37	38
Ground	H	A	H	A	H	A	A	H	A	H	A	H	H	A	H	A	H	A	H	A	H	A	H	A	H	H	A	H	A	H	A	A	H	A	H	A	H	A
Result	D	L	D	D	D	L	L	W	L	W	L	W	W	L	L	W	L	D	L	L	W	D	D	D	W	W	L	D	W	D	W	L	D	L	W	L	D	D
Position	13	18	18	17	17	17	18	14	16	16	17	15	14	15	15	14	14	14	15	15	15	15	15	15	14	14	14	14	14	13	11	13	13	13	12	12	12	13

Updated to match(es) played on 31 May 2009. Source: Competitive matches
A = Away; H = Home; W = Win; D = Draw; L = Loss

==== Matches ====
30 August 2008 1	Sampdoria	1–1	Internazionale	Genoa
20:30 CEST	Delvecchio 68'		Ibrahimović 33'	Stadium: Stadio Luigi Ferraris; Attendance: 33,975; Referee: Roberto Rosetti

14 September 2008 2	Lazio	2–0	Sampdoria	Rome
15:00 CEST	Zárate 7'; Pandev 72'			Stadium: Stadio Olimpico; Attendance: 35,000; Referee: Christian Brighi

21 September 2008 3	Sampdoria	1–1	Chievo	Genoa
20:30 CEST	Franceschini 49'		Langella 51'	Stadium: Stadio Luigi Ferraris; Attendance: 21,337; Referee: Nicola Ayroldi

24 September 2008 4	Siena	0–0	Sampdoria	Siena
20:30 CEST				Stadium: Stadio Artemio Franchi; Attendance: 8,348; Referee: Dino Tommasi

28 September 2008 5	Sampdoria	0–0	Juventus	Genoa
20:30 CEST				Stadium: Stadio Luigi Ferraris; Attendance: 27,043; Referee: Nicola Rizzoli

5 October 2008 6	Atalanta	4–2	Sampdoria	Bergamo
15:00 CEST	Floccari 35', 77'; Garics 39'; Doni 83'		Cassano 7', 54' (pen.)	Stadium: Stadio Atleti Azzurri d'Italia; Attendance: 12,020; Referee: Oscar Girardi

19 October 2008 7	Milan	3–0	Sampdoria	Milan
15:00 CEST	Ronaldinho 56' (pen.), 66'; Inzaghi 90'			Stadium: San Siro; Attendance: 65,960; Referee: Antonio Damato

26 October 2008 8	Sampdoria	2–0	Bologna	Genoa
15:00 CET	Delvecchio 61'; Bellucci 74'			Stadium: Stadio Luigi Ferraris; Attendance: 21,928; Referee: Domenico Celi

2 November 2008 10	Sampdoria	1–0	Torino	Genoa
15:00 CET	Bellucci 85'			Stadium: Stadio Luigi Ferraris; Attendance: 20,511; Referee: Nicola Ayroldi

9 November 2008 11	Napoli	2–0	Sampdoria	Naples
15:00 CET	Mannini 23'; Zalayeta 74'			Stadium: Stadio San Paolo; Attendance: 47,782; Referee: Roberto Rosetti

16 November 2008 12	Sampdoria	3–2	Lecce	Genoa
15:00 CET	Delvecchio 11'; Cassano 15'; Stankevicius 61'		Tiribocchi 55', 82'	Stadium: Stadio Luigi Ferraris; Attendance: 21,428; Referee: Matteo Trefoloni

23 November 2008 13	Sampdoria	3–0	Catania	Genoa
15:00 CET	Bellucci 6'; Cassano 62', 90+1'			Stadium: Stadio Luigi Ferraris; Attendance: 21,438; Referee: Dino Tommasi

30 November 2008 14	Cagliari	1–0	Sampdoria	Cagliari
15:00 CET	Jeda 48'			Stadium: Stadio Sant'Elia; Attendance: 12,000; Referee: Massimiliano Saccani

7 December 2008 15	Sampdoria	0–1	Genoa	Genoa
20:30 CET			Milito 50'	Stadium: Stadio Luigi Ferraris; Attendance: 34,395; Referee: Stefano Farina

14 December 2008 16	Reggina	0–2	Sampdoria	Reggio Calabria
15:00 CET			Bellucci 75' (pen.); Padalino 81'	Stadium: Stadio Oreste Granillo; Attendance: 11,196; Referee: Gabriele Gava

21 December 2008 17	Sampdoria	0–1	Fiorentina	Genoa
15:00 CET			Montolivo 19'	Stadium: Stadio Luigi Ferraris; Attendance: 22,813; Referee: Daniele Orsato

11 January 2009 18	Udinese	1–1	Sampdoria	Udine
15:00 CET	Domizzi 62'		Delvecchio 57'	Stadium: Stadio Friuli; Attendance: 14,356; Referee: Paolo Valeri

14 January 2009 9	Roma	2–0	Sampdoria	Rome
20:30 CET	Baptista 21', 53'			Stadium: Stadio Olimpico; Attendance: 32,304; Referee: Paolo Tagliavento

18 January 2009 19	Sampdoria	0–2	Palermo	Genoa
15:00 CET			Bresciano 45', 58'	Stadium: Stadio Luigi Ferraris; Attendance: 21,546; Referee: Nicola Stefanini

25 January 2009 20	Internazionale	1–0	Sampdoria	Milan
20:30 CET	Adriano 45+1'			Stadium: San Siro; Attendance: 45,359; Referee: Domenico Celi

28 January 2009 21	Sampdoria	3–1	Lazio	Genoa
20:30 CET	Delvecchio 13'; Cassano 55'; Stankevičius 55'		Rocchi 30'	Stadium: Stadio Luigi Ferraris; Attendance: 25,000; Referee: Nicola Ayroldi

1 February 2009 22	Chievo	1–1	Sampdoria	Verona
15:00 CET	Rigoni 75'		Pazzini 73'	Stadium: Stadio Marcantonio Bentegodi; Attendance: 10,511; Referee: Gabriele Gava

8 February 2009 23	Sampdoria	2–2	Siena	Genoa
15:00 CET	Bellucci 45+1'; Pazzini 51'		Vergassola 21'; Maccarone 80'	Stadium: Stadio Luigi Ferraris; Attendance: 21,118; Referee: Oscar Girardi

15 February 2009 24	Juventus	1–1	Sampdoria	Turin
15:00 CET	Amauri 62'		Pazzini 10'	Stadium: Stadio Olimpico di Torino; Attendance: 23,066; Referee: Daniele Orsato

22 February 2009 25	Sampdoria	1–0	Atalanta	Genoa
15:00 CET	Pazzini 61'			Stadium: Stadio Luigi Ferraris; Attendance: 20,387; Referee: Antonio Giannoccaro

1 March 2009 26	Sampdoria	2–1	Milan	Genoa
15:00 CET	Cassano 33'; Pazzini 51'		Pato 80'	Stadium: Stadio Luigi Ferraris; Attendance: 25,402; Referee: Gianluca Rocchi

8 March 2009 27	Bologna	3–0	Sampdoria	Bologna
15:00 CET	Di Vaio 45+1', 87', 90+1'			Stadium: Stadio Renato Dall'Ara; Attendance: 18,417; Referee: Luca Banti

15 March 2009 28	Sampdoria	2–2	Roma	Genoa
15:00 CET	Pazzini 25', 43'		Baptista 7', 70' (pen.)	Stadium: Stadio Luigi Ferraris; Attendance: 21,430; Referee: Roberto Rosetti

22 March 2009 29	Torino	1–3	Sampdoria	Turin
15:00 CET	Bianchi 29'		Pazzini 8'; Sammarco 24'; Cassano 69'	Stadium: Stadio Olimpico di Torino; Attendance: 16,034; Referee: Emidio Morganti

5 April 2009 30	Sampdoria	2–2	Napoli	Genoa
15:00 CEST (UTC+02:00)	Palombo 28', 63'		Zalayeta 44'; Denis 90+2'	Stadium: Stadio Luigi Ferraris; Attendance: 21,644; Referee: Paolo Tagliavento

11 April 2009 31	Lecce	1–3	Sampdoria	Lecce
15:00 CEST	Caserta 59' (pen.)		Pazzini 11'; Cassano 30', 88' (pen.)	Stadium: Stadio Via del Mare; Attendance: 12,232; Referee: Paolo Dondarini

19 April 2009 32	Catania	2–0	Sampdoria	Catania
15:00 CEST	Mascara 39' (pen.); Martínez 48'			Stadium: Stadio Angelo Massimino; Attendance: 17,463; Referee: Massimiliano Velotto

26 April 2009 33	Sampdoria	3–3	Cagliari	Genoa
15:00 CEST	Marilungo 26', 44'; Cassano 86'		Matri 48'; Acquafresca 67' (pen.); Conti 80'	Stadium: Stadio Luigi Ferraris; Attendance: 21,605; Referee: Gabriele Gava

3 May 2009 34	Genoa	3–1	Sampdoria	Genoa
20:30 CEST	Milito 30', 73', 90+3'		Campagnaro 45+3'	Stadium: Stadio Luigi Ferraris; Attendance: 32,303; Referee: Emidio Morganti

9 May 2009 35	Sampdoria	5–0	Reggina	Genoa
18:00 CEST	Dessena 2', 30'; Delvecchio 36'; Marilungo 47'; Pazzini 52'			Stadium: Stadio Luigi Ferraris; Attendance: 21,907; Referee: Matteo Trefoloni

17 May 2009 36	Fiorentina	1–0	Sampdoria	Florence
15:00 CEST	Gilardino 21'			Stadium: Stadio Artemio Franchi; Attendance: 38,005; Referee: Andrea Gervasoni

24 May 2009 37	Sampdoria	2–2	Udinese	Genoa
15:00 CEST	Isla 32' (o.g.); Cassano 45' (pen.)		D'Agostino 13' (pen.); Felipe 61'	Stadium: Stadio Luigi Ferraris; Attendance: 21,937; Referee: Domenico Celi

31 May 2009 38	Palermo	2–2	Sampdoria	Palermo
15:00 CEST	Miccoli 8'; Succi 42'		Pazzini 45'; Stankevicius 59'	Stadium: Stadio Renzo Barbera; Attendance: 23,246; Referee: Michele Cavarretta

=== Coppa Italia ===
12 November 2008 Round of 16	Sampdoria	2–1	Empoli	Genoa
19:30 CET	Bonazzoli 31'; Fornaroli 45'		Lodi 62'	Stadium: Stadio Luigi Ferraris; Referee: Dino Tommasi

21 January 2009 Quarter-finals	Udinese	1–1 (a.e.t.) (1–4 p)	Sampdoria	Udine
18:00 CET	Di Natale 63' (pen.)		Pazzini 55'	Stadium: Stadio Friuli; Referee: Nicola Pierpaoli
	Penalties
	D'Agostino (penalty missed); Di Natale (penalty scored); Pepe (penalty missed)		(penalty scored) Pazzini; (penalty scored) Palombo; (penalty scored) Sammarco; (penalty scored) Gastaldello

4 March 2009 Semi-finals; First leg	Sampdoria	3–0	Internazionale	Genoa
20:45 CET	Cassano 9'; Pazzini 30', 42'			Stadium: Stadio Luigi Ferraris; Attendance: 14,185; Referee: Massimiliano Saccani

23 April 2009 Semi-finals; Second leg	Internazionale	1–0 (1–3 agg.)	Sampdoria	Milan
20:45 CEST	Ibrahimović 27'			Stadium: San Siro; Attendance: 41,138; Referee: Daniele Orsato

13 May 2009 Final	Lazio	1–1 (a.e.t.) (6–5 p)	Sampdoria	Rome
20:45 CEST	Zárate 4'	Report	Pazzini 31'	Stadium: Stadio Olimpico; Attendance: 68,000; Referee: Roberto Rosetti
	Penalties
	Ledesma (penalty scored); Rocchi (penalty missed); Rozehnal (penalty scored); Kolarov (penalty scored); Zárate (penalty scored); Lichtsteiner (penalty scored); Dabo (penalty scored)		(penalty missed) Cassano; (penalty scored) Palombo; (penalty scored) Pazzini; (penalty scored) Gastaldello; (penalty scored) Accardi; (penalty scored) Delvecchio; (penalty missed) Campagnaro

=== UEFA Cup ===
==== First round ====
18 September 2008 First leg	Sampdoria (Italy)	5–0	(Lithuania) Kaunas	Genoa, Italy
20:45	Bonazzoli 14', 22'; Cassano 36', 57'; Fornaroli 90'	Report		Stadium: Stadio Luigi Ferraris; Attendance: 16,870; Referee: Steve Tanner (England)

2 October 2008 Second leg	Kaunas (Lithuania)	1–2 (1–7 agg.)	(Italy) Sampdoria	Kaunas, Lithuania
18:00	Zelmikas 17'	Report	Fornaroli 48'; Bonazzoli 60'	Stadium: S. Darius and S. Girėnas Stadium; Attendance: 1,500; Referee: Alexandru Deaconu (Romania)

==== Group stage ====
Pos	Team	Pld	W	D	L	GF	GA	GD	Pts	Qualification	STD	STU	SAM	SEV	PTZ
1	(Belgium) Standard Liège	4	3	0	1	5	3	+2	9	Advance to knockout stage	—	—	3–0	1–0	—
2	(Germany) VfB Stuttgart	4	2	1	1	6	3	+3	7	Advance to knockout stage	3–0	—	—	—	2–0
3	(Italy) Sampdoria	4	2	1	1	4	5	−1	7	Advance to knockout stage	—	1–1	—	1–0	—
4	(Spain) Sevilla	4	2	0	2	5	2	+3	6		—	2–0	—	—	3–0
5	(Serbia) Partizan	4	0	0	4	1	8	−7	0		0–1	—	1–2	—	—

Source: RSSSF

23 October 2008 1	Partizan (Serbia)	1–2	(Italy) Sampdoria	Belgrade, Serbia
21:00	Diarra 34'	Report	Bonazzoli 20'; Dessena 55'	Stadium: Partizan Stadium; Attendance: 23,780; Referee: Lucílio Batista (Portugal)

27 November 2008 2	Sampdoria (Italy)	1–1	(Germany) VfB Stuttgart	Genoa, Italy
20:45	Sammarco 39'	Report	Marica 8'	Stadium: Stadio Luigi Ferraris; Attendance: 15,000; Referee: Damir Skomina (Slovenia)

3 December 2008 3	Standard Liège (Belgium)	3–0	(Italy) Sampdoria	Liège, Belgium
20:45	De Camargo 23'; Onyewu 35'; Jovanović 43'	Report		Stadium: Stade Maurice Dufrasne; Attendance: 26,833; Referee: Tony Chapron (France)

18 December 2008 4	Sampdoria (Italy)	1–0	(Spain) Sevilla	Genoa, Italy
20:45	Bottinelli 75'	Report		Stadium: Stadio Luigi Ferraris; Attendance: 15,000; Referee: Howard Webb (England)

==== Knockout phase ====
===== Round of 32 =====
18 February 2009 First leg	Sampdoria (Italy)	0–1	(Ukraine) Metalist Kharkiv	Genoa, Italy
20:45		Report	Oliynyk 45+3'	Stadium: Stadio Luigi Ferraris; Attendance: 14,774; Referee: Cristian Balaj (Romania)

26 February 2009 Second leg	Metalist Kharkiv (Ukraine)	2–0 (3–0 agg.)	(Italy) Sampdoria	Kharkiv, Ukraine
18:00	Valyayev 30'; Jajá 40'	Report		Stadium: Metalist Stadium; Attendance: 33,000; Referee: Knut Kircher (Germany)
