= 2007–08 UC Sampdoria season =

Sampdoria
2007–08 season
- Chairman: Riccardo Garrone
- Manager: Walter Mazzarri
- Serie A: 6th
- Coppa Italia: Quarter-finals
- UEFA Intertoto Cup: Third round
- UEFA Cup: First round
- Top goalscorer: League: Claudio Bellucci (12); All: Claudio Bellucci (13)

UC Sampdoria had a successful season in the domestic league, finishing in sixth place. The club also captured Antonio Cassano from Real Madrid, with the notorious troublemaker settling in well at Sampdoria, helping the club to European qualification. The season also saw the first Serie A derbies between Sampdoria and Genoa since 1995, with Sampdoria winning the second one with 1-0, following a goalless draw in the beginning of the league campaign.

== First-team squad ==
Squad at end of season

Note: Flags indicate national team as defined under FIFA eligibility rules; some limited exceptions apply. Players may hold more than one non-FIFA nationality.

No.	Pos.	Nation	Player
1	GK	ITA	Luca Castellazzi
3	MF	SUI	Reto Ziegler
4	MF	ITA	Sergio Volpi
5	DF	ITA	Pietro Accardi
6	DF	ITA	Stefano Lucchini
7	DF	ITA	Christian Maggio
8	MF	ITA	Andrea Poli
9	FW	ITA	Vincenzo Montella
11	FW	ITA	Claudio Bellucci
13	FW	ITA	Emiliano Bonazzoli
14	DF	ITA	Luigi Sala
16	DF	ARG	Hugo Campagnaro
17	MF	ITA	Angelo Palombo (captain)
18	MF	HUN	Vladimir Koman

No.	Pos.	Nation	Player
19	MF	ITA	Daniele Franceschini
21	MF	ITA	Paolo Sammarco
22	FW	NGA	Ikechukwu Kalu
26	MF	SRB	Nikola Gulan
28	DF	ITA	Daniele Gastaldello
32	DF	URU	Leonardo Migliónico
40	MF	ITA	Gennaro Delvecchio
46	DF	ITA	Mirko Pieri
77	MF	ITA	Cristian Zenoni
83	GK	ITA	Antonio Mirante
88	FW	USA	Gabriel Enzo Ferrari
90	GK	ITA	Vincenzo Fiorillo
99	FW	ITA	Antonio Cassano

== Competitions ==
=== Serie A ===
==== League table ====
Pos	Team	Pld	W	D	L	GF	GA	GD	Pts	Qualification or relegation
4	Fiorentina	38	19	9	10	55	39	+16	66	Qualification to Champions League third qualifying round
5	Milan	38	18	10	10	66	38	+28	64	Qualification to UEFA Cup first round (Note: The 7th-placed team qualified for the UEFA Cup due to both of the Coppa Italia finalists, Roma and Internazionale, finishing 6th or higher.)
6	Sampdoria	38	17	9	12	56	46	+10	60	Qualification to UEFA Cup first round
7	Udinese	38	16	9	13	48	53	−5	57	Qualification to UEFA Cup first round
8	Napoli	38	14	8	16	50	53	−3	50	Qualification to Intertoto Cup third round

Source: Serie A
Rules for classification: 1) points; 2) head-to-head points; 3) head-to-head goal difference; 4) head-to-head goals scored; 5) goal difference; 6) number of goals scored.

==== Results summary ====
Overall								Home						Away					
Pld	W	D	L	GF	GA	GD	Pts	W	D	L	GF	GA	GD	W	D	L	GF	GA	GD
38	17	9	12	56	46	+10	60	10	7	2	35	18	+17	7	2	10	21	28	−7

Last updated: 17 May 2008.
Source: Competitive matches

==== Results by round ====
Round	1	2	3	4	5	6	7	8	9	10	11	12	13	14	15	16	17	18	19	20	21	22	23	24	25	26	27	28	29	30	31	32	33	34	35	36	37	38
Ground	A	H	A	H	A	H	A	H	A	H	A	H	A	H	A	H	A	H	A	H	A	H	A	H	A	H	A	H	A	H	A	H	A	H	A	H	A	H
Result	W	D	L	D	L	W	L	W	L	L	W	W	L	W	L	D	L	W	D	W	L	W	W	D	L	D	W	W	W	D	W	W	L	W	D	L	W	D
Position	6	7	10	10	14	10	12	9	12	13	12	8	10	7	10	10	10	9	8	7	8	7	7	7	7	7	7	6	6	7	7	6	6	6	6	7	6	6

Updated to match(es) played on 17 May 2008. Source: Competitive matches
A = Away; H = Home; W = Win; D = Draw; L = Loss

==== Matches ====
26 August 2007 1	Siena	1–2	Sampdoria	Siena
15:00 CEST	Corvia 69'		Bellucci 34'; Montella 86'	Stadium: Stadio Artemio Franchi; Attendance: 10,768; Referee: Daniele Orsato

2 September 2007 2	Sampdoria	0–0	Lazio	Genoa
20:30 CEST				Stadium: Stadio Luigi Ferraris; Attendance: 20,564; Referee: Gianluca Rocchi

16 September 2007 3	Napoli	2–0	Sampdoria	Naples
15:00 CEST	Zalayeta 43'; Hamšík 77'			Stadium: Stadio San Paolo; Attendance: 43,490; Referee: Gabriele Gava

23 September 2007 4	Sampdoria	0–0	Genoa	Genoa
20:30 CEST				Stadium: Stadio Luigi Ferraris; Attendance: 33,060; Referee: Roberto Rosetti

26 September 2007 5	Internazionale	3–0	Sampdoria	Milan
20:30 CEST	Ibrahimović 23', 49'; Figo 58'			Stadium: San Siro; Attendance: 42,013; Referee: Paolo Tagliavento

30 September 2007 6	Sampdoria	3–0	Atalanta	Genoa
15:00 CEST	Bellucci 4'; Sammarco 57'; Cassano 83'			Stadium: Stadio Luigi Ferraris; Attendance: 19,991; Referee: Nicola Ayroldi

7 October 2007 7	Torino	1–0	Sampdoria	Turin
15:00 CEST	Corini 87'			Stadium: Stadio Olimpico di Torino; Attendance: 16,401; Referee: Massimiliano Saccani

21 October 2007 8	Sampdoria	3–0	Parma	Genoa
15:00 CEST	Montella 26'; Bellucci 48', 58'			Stadium: Stadio Luigi Ferraris; Attendance: 20,038; Referee: Matteo Trefoloni

28 October 2007 9	Catania	2–0	Sampdoria	Catania
15:00 CET	Mascara 2'; Martínez 42'			Stadium: Stadio Angelo Massimino; Attendance: 16,276; Referee: Oscar Girardi

31 October 2007 10	Sampdoria	0–5	Milan	Genoa
20:30 CET			Kaká 47'; Gilardino 53', 61'; Gourcuff 76'; Seedorf 80'	Stadium: Stadio Luigi Ferraris; Attendance: 22,195; Referee: Nicola Ayroldi

4 November 2007 11	Cagliari	0–3	Sampdoria	Cagliari
15:00 CET			Volpi 33'; Caracciolo 39'; Maggio 45'	Stadium: Stadio Sant'Elia; Attendance: 5,000; Referee: Emidio Morganti

10 November 2007 12	Sampdoria	3–0	Empoli	Genoa
18:00 CET	Giacomazzi 5' (o.g.); Montella 40'; Sammarco 89'			Stadium: Stadio Luigi Ferraris; Attendance: 19,326; Referee: Luca Palanca

25 November 2007 13	Livorno	3–1	Sampdoria	Livorno
15:00 CET	Knežević 8'; Tavano 10', 88'		Bellucci 80'	Stadium: Stadio Armando Picchi; Attendance: 7,066; Referee: Andrea Gervasoni

1 December 2007 14	Sampdoria	3–0	Reggina	Genoa
18:00 CET	Bellucci 5', 76'; Sammarco 55'			Stadium: Stadio Luigi Ferraris; Attendance: 19,058; Referee: Paolo Tagliavento

9 December 2007 15	Udinese	3–2	Sampdoria	Udine
15:00 CET	Di Natale 23'; Quagliarella 70', 87'		Bellucci 34' (pen.); Maggio 40'	Stadium: Stadio Friuli; Attendance: 13,406; Referee: Antonio Damato

16 December 2007 16	Sampdoria	2–2	Fiorentina	Genoa
15:00 CET	Gastaldello 18'; Cassano 70'	Report	Mutu 39'; Donadel 58'	Stadium: Stadio Luigi Ferraris; Attendance: 20,000; Referee: Gabriele Gava

22 December 2007 17	Roma	2–0	Sampdoria	Rome
20:30 CET	Totti 18' (pen.), 90'			Stadium: Stadio Olimpico; Attendance: 30,000; Referee: Andrea Gervasoni

13 January 2008 18	Sampdoria	3–0	Palermo	Genoa
15:00 CET	Bellucci 20'; Sammarco 45'; Cassano 77'			Stadium: Stadio Luigi Ferraris; Attendance: 19,574; Referee: Luca Banti

20 January 2008 19	Juventus	0–0	Sampdoria	Turin
15:00 CET				Stadium: Stadio Olimpico di Torino; Attendance: 22,379; Referee: Massimiliano Saccani

26 January 2008 20	Sampdoria	1–0	Siena	Genoa
18:00 CET	Cassano 44'			Stadium: Stadio Luigi Ferraris; Attendance: 19,561; Referee: Paolo Mazzoleni

3 February 2008 21	Lazio	2–1	Sampdoria	Rome
15:00 CET	Mauri 37'; Rocchi 77'		Cassano 45+1'	Stadium: Stadio Olimpico; Attendance: 18,683; Referee: Daniele Orsato

10 February 2008 22	Sampdoria	2–0	Napoli	Genoa
15:00 CET	G. Delvecchio 76'; Franceschini 82'			Stadium: Stadio Luigi Ferraris; Attendance: 43,490; Referee: Gabriele Gava

17 February 2008 23	Genoa	0–1	Sampdoria	Genoa
15:00 CET			Maggio 87'	Stadium: Stadio Luigi Ferraris; Attendance: 31,618; Referee: Nicola Rizzoli

24 February 2008 24	Sampdoria	1–1	Internazionale	Genoa
15:00 CET	Cassano 65'		Crespo 76'	Stadium: Stadio Luigi Ferraris; Attendance: 26,306; Referee: Gianluca Rocchi

27 February 2008 25	Atalanta	4–1	Sampdoria	Bergamo
20:30 CET	Doni 13', 31'; Floccari 36'; Capelli 53'		Volpi 3'	Stadium: Stadio Atleti Azzurri d'Italia; Attendance: 10,444; Referee: Maurizio Ciampi

2 March 2008 26	Sampdoria	2–2	Torino	Genoa
15:00 CET	Sala 45'; Cassano 52'		Comotto 17'; Di Michele 51' (pen.)	Stadium: Stadio Luigi Ferraris; Attendance: 19,032; Referee: Nicola Pierpaoli

9 March 2008 27	Parma	1–2	Sampdoria	Parma
15:00 CET	Budan 67'		Maggio 12'; Bonazzoli 57'	Stadium: Stadio Ennio Tardini; Attendance: 16,763; Referee: Domenico Celi

16 March 2008 28	Sampdoria	3–1	Catania	Genoa
15:00 CET	Palombo 68'; Accardi 76'; Bellucci 86'		Stovini 74'	Stadium: Stadio Luigi Ferraris; Attendance: 19,409; Referee: Andrea Romeo

19 March 2008 29	Milan	1–2	Sampdoria	Milan
20:30 CET	Paloschi 71'		Maggio 12'; Delvecchio 25'	Stadium: San Siro; Attendance: 52,477; Referee: Luca Banti

22 March 2008 30	Sampdoria	1–1	Cagliari	Genoa
15:00 CET	Franceschini 90+1'		Foggia 42'	Stadium: Stadio Luigi Ferraris; Attendance: 19,877; Referee: Paolo Valeri

30 March 2008 31	Empoli	0–2	Sampdoria	Empoli
15:00 CEST			Sammarco 7'; Marzoratti 16' (o.g.)	Stadium: Stadio Carlo Castellani; Attendance: 7,066; Referee: Matteo Trefoloni

6 April 2008 32	Sampdoria	2–0	Livorno	Genoa
15:00 CEST	Maggio 67'; Bonazzoli 85'			Stadium: Stadio Luigi Ferraris; Attendance: 21,462; Referee: Andrea Romeo

13 April 2008 33	Reggina	1–0	Sampdoria	Reggio Calabria
15:00 CEST	Brienza 35'			Stadium: Stadio Oreste Granillo; Attendance: 11,082; Referee: Gabriele Gava

20 April 2008 34	Sampdoria	3–0	Udinese	Genoa
15:00 CEST	Cassano 24'; Bellucci 44', 55' (pen.)			Stadium: Stadio Luigi Ferraris; Attendance: 25,181; Referee: Paolo Dondarini

27 April 2008 35	Fiorentina	2–2	Sampdoria	Florence
15:00 CEST	Vieri 78'; Mutu 84' (pen.)		Maggio 63'; Gastaldello 90+4'	Stadium: Stadio Artemio Franchi; Attendance: 36,627; Referee: Roberto Rosetti

4 May 2008 36	Sampdoria	0–3	Roma	Genoa
15:00 CEST			Panucci 75'; Pizarro 78'; Cicinho 85'	Stadium: Stadio Luigi Ferraris; Attendance: 24,311; Referee: Massimiliano Saccani

11 May 2008 37	Palermo	0–2	Sampdoria	Palermo
15:00 CEST			Cassano 61'; Maggio 75'	Stadium: Stadio Renzo Barbera; Attendance: 23,929; Referee: Carmine Russo

17 May 2008 38	Sampdoria	3–3	Juventus	Genoa
15:00 CEST	Molinaro 21' (o.g.); Maggio 40'; Montella 80'		Del Piero 6', 65' (pen.); Trezeguet 15' (pen.)	Stadium: Stadio Luigi Ferraris; Attendance: 26,953; Referee: Paolo Valeri

=== Coppa Italia ===
==== Round of 16 ====
12 December 2007 First leg	Cagliari	1–0	Sampdoria	Cagliari
20:30 CET	Matri 73'			Stadium: Stadio Sant'Elia; Attendance: 2,000; Referee: Luca Palanca

16 January 2008 Second leg	Sampdoria	4–0 (4–1 agg.)	Cagliari	Genoa
20:30 CET	Bonazzoli 4', 89'; Sala 48'; Palombo 75'			Stadium: Stadio Luigi Ferraris; Attendance: 10,000; Referee: Massimiliano Velotto

==== Quarter-finals ====
23 January 2008 First leg	Sampdoria	1–1	Roma	Genoa
18:30 CET	Ziegler 62'		Vučinić 69'	Stadium: Stadio Luigi Ferraris; Attendance: 15,000; Referee: Emidio Morganti

29 January 2008 Second leg	Roma	1–0 (2–1 agg.)	Sampdoria	Rome
21:00 CET	Mancini 60'			Stadium: Stadio Olimpico; Attendance: 24,715; Referee: Nicola Ayroldi

=== UEFA Intertoto Cup ===
==== Third round ====
21 July 2007 First leg	Cherno More Varna (Bulgaria)	0–1	(Italy) Sampdoria	Burgas, Bulgaria
18:00			Lucchini 43'	Stadium: Naftex Stadium; Attendance: 7,200; Referee: Brage Sandmoen (Norway)

28 July 2007 Second leg	Sampdoria (Italy)	1–0 (2–0 agg.)	(Bulgaria) Cherno More Varna	Genoa, Italy
20:45	Maggio 90+1'			Stadium: Stadio Luigi Ferraris; Attendance: 20,812; Referee: Björn Kuipers (Netherlands)

=== UEFA Cup ===
==== Second qualifying round ====
16 August 2007 First leg	Hajduk Split (Croatia)	0–1	(Italy) Sampdoria	Split, Croatia
20:45		Report	Campagnaro 44'	Stadium: Stadion Poljud; Attendance: 35,000; Referee: Bruno Paixão (Portugal)

30 August 2007 Second leg	Sampdoria (Italy)	1–1 (2–1 agg.)	(Croatia) Hajduk Split	Genoa, Italy
20:45	Montella 34' (pen.)	Report	Hrgović 83'	Stadium: Stadio Luigi Ferraris; Attendance: 21,367; Referee: Pavel Královec (Czech Republic)

==== First round ====
20 September 2007 First leg	Sampdoria (Italy)	2–2	(Denmark) AaB	Genoa, Italy
20:45	Delvecchio 18'; Bellucci 59'	Report	Prica 19'; Johansson 54'	Stadium: Stadio Luigi Ferraris; Attendance: 15,000; Referee: Thomas Einwaller (Austria)

4 October 2007 Second leg	AaB (Denmark)	0–0 (2a–2 agg.)	(Italy) Sampdoria	Aalborg, Denmark
19:00		Report		Stadium: Aalborg Stadion; Attendance: 10,000; Referee: Johan Verbist (Belgium)

== Statistics ==
=== Top scorers ===
==== Serie A ====
- (Italy) Claudio Bellucci 12
- (Italy) Antonio Cassano 10
- (Italy) Christian Maggio 8
- (Italy) Vincenzo Montella 4

== Sources ==
- RSSSF - Italy 2007/08
