= Gastaldello =

Gastaldello is a surname. Notable people with the surname include:

- Béryl Gastaldello (born 1995), French swimmer
- Daniele Gastaldello (born 1983), Italian footballer
