= Antonio Cassano =

Italian footballer (born 1982)

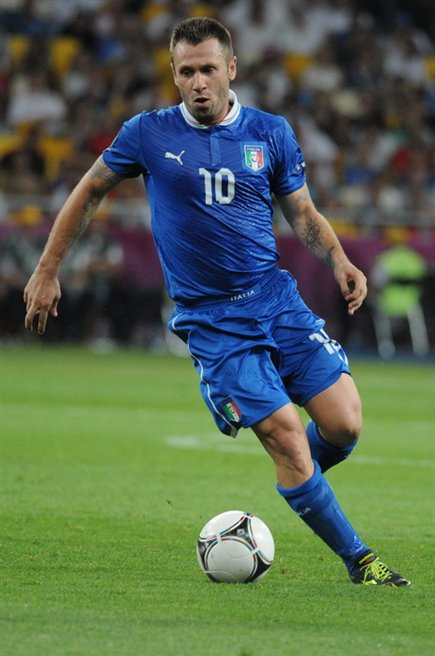
- Cassano with Italy at the UEFA Euro 2012

Personal information
- Full name: Antonio Cassano
- Date of birth: 12 July 1982 (age 44)
- Place of birth: Bari, Italy
- Height: 1.75 m (5 ft 9 in)
- Positions: Forward; attacking midfielder

Youth career
- 1997–1998: Bari

Senior career*
Years	Team	Apps	(Gls)
1999–2001	Bari	48	(6)
2001–2006	Roma	118	(39)
2006–2008	Real Madrid	19	(2)
2007–2008	→ Sampdoria (loan)	22	(10)
2008–2011	Sampdoria	74	(25)
2011–2012	AC Milan	33	(7)
2012–2013	Inter Milan	28	(7)
2013–2015	Parma	53	(17)
2015–2017	Sampdoria	24	(2)
2017	Verona	0	(0)
Total		419	(115)

International career
1998	Italy U15	9	(2)
1998	Italy U16	2	(0)
1999	Italy U18	2	(0)
2000	Italy U20	8	(2)
2000–2002	Italy U21	9	(3)
2003–2014	Italy	39	(10)
- * Club domestic league appearances and goals

Antonio Cassano (Italian pronunciation: [anˈtɔːnjo kasˈsaːno]; born 12 July 1982) is an Italian former professional footballer who played as a forward. A talented and technically gifted player, he was usually deployed as a supporting forward, but could also play as an attacking midfielder, winger, or as a striker. Nicknamed Il Gioiello di Bari Vecchia ("the jewel of Old Bari"), and Fantantonio ("fantastic Antonio"), he was known for his short temper as much as his skill and ability on the pitch. Cassano won an Italian and Spanish league title each throughout his career as major honours.

Cassano began his senior club career with hometown club Bari in 1999; his performances earned him a transfer to Roma two years later, where he won the Supercoppa Italiana and was twice named Serie A Young Footballer of the Year in 2001 and 2003. In 2006, he moved to La Liga club Real Madrid, where he won a league title, but was chastised for his poor behaviour, inconsistent performances, and work-rate, and returned to Italy a year later, on loan to Sampdoria. There, he refound his form, and was signed by the club on a permanent basis in 2008. He then spent single seasons with AC Milan and cross-city rivals Inter Milan, winning a Serie A title and his Supercoppa Italiana with the former, before signing for Parma in 2013. In 2015, he returned to Sampdoria, and in 2017, signed with Verona. He failed to make an appearance for the club and subsequently retired.

At international level, Cassano represented the Italy national football team on 39 occasions between 2003 and 2014, scoring 10 goals; he took part at three UEFA European Championships, and one FIFA World Cup, winning a runners-up medal at UEFA Euro 2012. Along with Mario Balotelli, he is Italy's top-scorer in the UEFA European Championships, with three goals.

Cassano's short temper and disputes with managers and teammates led to birth of the neologism "cassanata" by his former coach, Fabio Capello, in 2002. The word is now regularly used by Italian sports journalists as a euphemism for any behavior incompatible with team spirit.

== Club career ==
=== Bari ===
Cassano was born in Bari and his father left the family shortly thereafter. He was raised in poverty by his mother in the San Nicola district of the Bari Vecchia neighbourhood, and began playing football on the streets at an early age. Cassano was spotted by a Bari scout and brought up through the team's youth system, and he made his Serie A debut for Bari against local rivals Lecce on 11 December 1999. During his time with Bari, he soon emerged as one of Serie A's most promising young Italian players, drawing particular attention to himself after scoring a notable, individual, match-winning goal (his first ever Serie A goal) in a 2–1 home win over Italian giants Inter Milan, on 18 December 1999, at the age of 17: in the 88th minute, after controlling a 40-yard lobbed pass on the run with his backheel, he subsequently dribbled past veteran defenders Christian Panucci and Laurent Blanc, wrong-footing goalkeeper Fabrizio Ferron with a dummy, before finishing at the near post. Cassano's technical skill, precocious talent and impressive performances earned him the nicknames "Fantantonio", due to his flair and creativity, and "El Pibe de Bari" ("The Kid from Bari"), a reference to the legendary Diego Maradona's nickname, "El Pibe de Oro". During his two seasons with Bari, he scored a total of 6 goals in 48 Serie A matches, scoring 3 goals in 21 appearances during his first season, and 3 goals in 27 league matches during his second season with the club.

=== Roma ===
In 2001, at the age of 19, Cassano signed with reigning Serie A champions Roma for a transfer fee of 60 billion Italian lire (about €30 million); at the time, this was the most expensive teenage signing ever. His first season produced five goals, as well as a 2001 Supercoppa Italiana victory, and he attracted media attention after openly clashing with coach Fabio Capello after he was left out of a practice match a few days after his international debut. In the 2003 Italian Cup final against Milan, Cassano was sent off after protesting an official's decision, and he flashed the sign of the horns at the referee while leaving the pitch. During his time with Roma, he won the Serie A Young Footballer of the Year Award in 2001 and in 2003.

He was omitted from the squad during Roma's tumultuous 2004–05 campaign while Luigi Delneri, Roma's third coach of the season (after Cesare Prandelli and Rudi Völler), was in charge. After Delneri himself resigned during the season, his replacement, Bruno Conti, returned Cassano to the starting lineup, with Cassano captaining the team in the absence of incumbent Francesco Totti, who was serving a five-match suspension.

During the 2005–06 pre-season, Cassano was in constant conflict with club management over the renewal of his contract, which was due to expire on 30 June 2006. In January 2006, he acrimoniously parted ways with Roma and signed with Real Madrid for just €5M.

=== Real Madrid ===
Cassano became the second ever Italian player to sign for Real Madrid after former Roma teammate Christian Panucci. His debut came on 18 January 2006 in a Spanish Cup match against Real Betis, and scored his first goal just three minutes after entering the match in the second half. Just four months into his tenure with the club, however, he began gaining weight due to poor eating habits, which resulted in Madrid fining him for every gram he remained over his playing weight, and earned him the nickname "Gordito".

On 30 October, Real Madrid's official website announced that Cassano had been suspended due to his "disrespect" of Capello, who had joined the club at the beginning of 2006–07 season, following a dressing room argument arising from his omission from the team after a game against Gimnàstic de Tarragona, and was subsequently benched along with David Beckham and Ronaldo. In an interview with a Roman radio station, Cassano said he would "walk all the way back" to rejoin Roma, and indicated his eagerness to make peace with Totti, with whom Cassano had conflicted with before his departure from Roma. Cassano, however, remained with Madrid after the January 2007 transfer window had closed, and the rest of his season was cut short by an ankle injury. Despite winning the 2006–07 La Liga title with Real Madrid, Cassano only made seven league appearances, scoring just a single goal.

In an interview with Spanish radio in July 2007, Real Madrid president Ramón Calderón described Cassano's attitude as "unsustainable in the last couple of months" and indicated that he would be leaving the club.

=== Sampdoria ===
On 13 August 2007, Sampdoria took Cassano on a one-year loan, agreeing to pay €1.2 million of his €4.2 million salary. He was presented to approximately 2,500 fans five days later. In his first press conference, Cassano said that he had chosen to wear the shirt number 99 for several reasons: firstly, as his first-choice, the number 18, was already taken by teammate Vladimir Koman, and because 9 plus 9 equals 18, secondly, because his other teammate Francesco Flachi was already wearing the number 10 shirt, which was his second choice, and thirdly, as he intended the number to be an homage to Brazilian striker Ronaldo, who was wearing the same number at Milan.

He made his Sampdoria début that season in the Derby della Lanterna against Genoa on 23 September, in which he was substituted by former Roma teammate Vincenzo Montella in the final minutes of the match. Cassano scored his first league goal upon his return against Atalanta a week later, in a 3–0 victory. He scored in three consecutive games in January, and helped end league leaders Inter's winning league run with a goal in a 1–1 draw. Cassano, however, was sent off in a 2–2 draw with Torino on 2 March 2008, which he compounded by hurling his shirt at the referee as he left the pitch, and was punished with a five-match ban. Sampdoria ended the season with an UEFA Cup berth, while Cassano was acquired on a permanent basis by the club on free transfer (plus bonus) from Madrid.

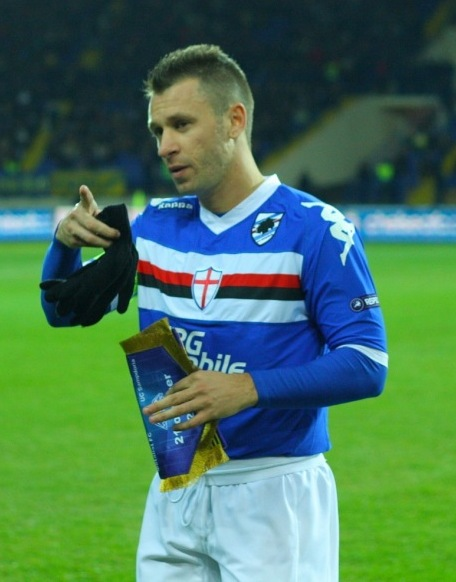
Cassano as Sampdoria captain

In his second season, Cassano confirmed to have temperamentally improved, also becoming vice-captain for the team behind Angelo Palombo. After the January signing of Giampaolo Pazzini from Fiorentina, Cassano managed to form a fruitful striking partnership with the former Viola forward, that was praised by both media and Sampdoria supporters, and led club chairman Riccardo Garrone to compare it with striking duo of Gianluca Vialli and Roberto Mancini that led Sampdoria to win their only Scudetto to date, an opinion that was later shared also by both Vialli and Mancini. Cassano scored 12 goals in Serie A and helped Sampdoria to reach the Coppa Italia final that season, scoring a goal in the semi-final against the Serie A Champions, Inter. In the final, Sampdoria were defeated by Lazio in a penalty shoot-out, with Cassano missing the first penalty.

His third season with Sampdoria again began very well, as he continued his prolific partnership with Pazzini, and was instrumental in the club's impressive seasonal start, that led them up to first place after a 1–0 home win to Inter. However, a result crisis, including a 3–0 defeat in the local derby against crosstown rivals Genoa, left Sampdoria down to mid-table on January, leading head coach Luigi Delneri to put Cassano off the team for "technical and tactical reasons", casting doubts about the player's future at the club.

In the final days of the January transfer window, he was linked with a move on loan to Fiorentina, that was however denied with an official statement from the club, but was described by the media as Cassano's own refusal to leave Sampdoria. This was confirmed by Cassano himself through an official statement published on Sampdoria's website, citing his relationship with club chairman Riccardo Garrone, his teammates and the team supporters as the main reason for his choice. He soon came back into the starting line-up, and eventually helped Sampdoria to a fourth-place finish UEFA Champions League qualifying spot in Serie A. Sampdoria were defeated by Werder Bremen in the play-off round, however, and were to enter into the Europa League that season. Del Neri left Sampdoria at the end of the season.

Cassano's final season with the club was more difficult. In October 2010, Cassano was excluded from the first team squad with immediate effect after he had a heated row with chairman Riccardo Garrone following the player's refusal to attend an award ceremony. Following such events, Sampdoria formally applied for a contract termination to a league arbitration panel, a position that was confirmed even after Cassano apologised to Garrone and the club. On 16 December, the arbitration panel ordered Sampdoria to reinclude Cassano into the first team from 1 January 2011, rejecting the Blucerchiati's request for a contract termination, but also concluding Cassano will be paid only 50% of his salary for the remainder of his contract.

=== Milan ===
On 20 December 2010, it was reported that Milan, Sampdoria and the player agreed on the instalment plan to pay a €5 million to Real Madrid, which was indicated in Cassano's buy-out clause when he left the Spanish club. Eventually, Sampdoria paid €5 million to Real Madrid; Milan paid €3.33 million to Sampdoria, while Cassano had a wage cut with Milan. Cassano then signed a three-and-a-half-year contract with Milan, which was later confirmed by Milan's owner Silvio Berlusconi, replacing the gap left by Ronaldinho's departure. His former strike partner at Sampdoria, Giampaolo Pazzini, also left the club in January to move to Milan's city rivals, Inter. Cassano made his debut for his new club in a 1–0 win against Cagliari where he came on as a substitute for Alexander Merkel in the latter stages of the game. He scored his first goal for Milan in a 4–0 win against Parma. He went on to score three more goals that season, as Milan claimed the 2010–11 Serie A title that season, Cassano's first Scudetto of his career; two of these goals came against former clubs Bari and Sampdoria, and the other one from a penalty against fierce rivals Inter on 2 April 2011, after coming on as a substitute; he was later sent off during the same match after being booked twice. In the meantime, Sampdoria struggled without Cassano and Pazzini, and were relegated to Serie B at the end of the season.

As Cassano faced competition for a spot in the Milan starting XI from the likes of forwards Zlatan Ibrahimović, Alexandre Pato and Robinho, a lot of speculation formed over his future for the following season, as Cassano wanted to gain more playing time, due to his wish to keep his spot in the Italian national side. Although he was initially linked to other clubs, he stayed with Milan, and after a good pre-season, he won the 2011 Supercoppa Italiana with Milan over Inter, and he scored in the first Serie A game of the 2011–12 season against Lazio. On 29 October 2011, following Milan's match against Roma in Rome, Cassano was hospitalised after suffering a stroke upon arriving in Milan, and was operated on 4 November. He returned to the first team on 7 April 2012, after almost six months on the side-lines, featuring as a substitute in Milan's 2–1 home defeat to Fiorentina in Serie A, and received a standing ovation from the crowd as he entered the pitch for Gianluca Zambrotta in the 79th minute. He also appeared as a substitute in a 1–0 home win against Genoa on 25 April, and on 29 April, he scored his first goal since his operation, in a 4–1 win over Siena, also setting up both of Ibrahimović's goals during the match. Milan finished the Serie A season in second place behind Juventus, also reaching the semi-finals of the Coppa Italia, and the quarter-finals of the Champions League.

=== Internazionale ===
After reportedly being upset over the sale of Milan's key players, particularly Zlatan Ibrahimović and Thiago Silva, Cassano requested a transfer. On 21 August 2012, Milan and Inter reached an agreement over an exchange deal involving Giampaolo Pazzini and Cassano, with a compensatory sum of €7.5 million in favor of the Nerazzurri. (Pazzini tagged for €13 million and Cassano for €5.5 million.) He officially joined the team the next day. Cassano signed a two-year contract with the club. Cassano's season at Inter was negative, as the club struggled in the league, while Cassano only scored five league goals and often argued with manager Andrea Stramaccioni, although he provided nine assists in Serie A. The club finished the 2012–13 Serie A season in ninth place. In total, he scored 9 goals in 39 games for Inter in all competitions, providing 15 assists.

=== Parma ===
After only one season at Inter, Cassano joined Parma on 4 July 2013 on a temporary deal, and was given the number 99 shirt that he had also worn at previous clubs. Cassano's work-rate, fitness and discipline improved at Parma, as he managed to keep control of his weight through a stricter diet and training regime, losing 10 kg. On 30 November, he scored his 100th Serie A goal in a 1–1 home draw against Bologna. He refound his form with the club and had a successful 2013–14 season at Parma, as he helped the club to a sixth-place finish in the league, achieving a Europa League qualifying spot, also scoring 13 goals and managing 8 assists in 36 appearances in all competitions, with 12 goals and 7 assists coming in Serie A. In February 2014, he signed a pre-contract agreement with Parma for the 2014–15 season.

In the first half of the 2014–15 season, Cassano managed 5 goals in 20 appearances as Parma were rooted to the bottom of the table and battling serious financial difficulties. On 26 January 2015, Parma allowed Cassano to terminate his contract with the club in advance, which made him a free agent; due to the club's financial struggles, he had reportedly not been paid his wages since June 2014. Following the termination of his contract, he was initially linked with a return to Inter.

=== Return to Sampdoria ===
Following his release from Parma back in January of the same year, Cassano re-joined former club Sampdoria for a third time on 9 August 2015. He agreed a two-year deal with the club, lasting until 30 June 2017. He scored his first goal since his return to the club on 10 January 2016, in the 64th minute of a 2–1 home defeat to Juventus.

During the 2016–17 pre-season, the club's president, Massimo Ferrero, communicated that Cassano was not a part of his plans and was excluded from the Sampdoria first team. Cassano rejected offers from several clubs and obtained permission to train with the Sampdoria youth side, in particular with the Primavera team's goalkeeper.

On 25 January 2017, Cassano terminated his contract with Sampdoria by mutual consent.

=== Hellas Verona, Entella trial and retirement ===
On 10 July 2017, Cassano was signed by Verona. He appeared in two summer friendlies for the club the next week; however, on 18 July, he was involved in a curious incident, which gained much publicity in the media: he initially communicated that he would be retiring from football, as he missed his family too much, before holding a press conference later the same day, in which he announced that he had reversed his decision, and stated that he was looking forward to "having a fun season" with Verona. However, on 24 July, he overturned his decision once again, stating that he would be leaving the club and retiring from football, commenting: "As opposed to what appeared on my wife’s official social profiles, I would like to clarify the following. Carolina was wrong, after thinking and reflecting in the end I decided. Antonio Cassano will not play football anymore. I apologise to the city of Verona, to all the fans, to the president. For a 35-year-old man I need to be motivated and at this moment I feel that my priority is represented by being close to my children and my wife." On 27 July, Cassano's contract with Verona was officially terminated by mutual consent, before he had played any official matches for the club; regarding his reasons for parting ways with Verona so suddenly, he later stated in an interview with Tiki Taka that "[t]here was no spark there", adding: "It's like when you’re seeing a woman and she no longer attracts you, so you leave. I took a big risk 12 years ago leaving Real Madrid for Sampdoria. I didn't feel like making a similar choice this time. I knew this would be a season of suffering for Verona, but I didn't know if I could give 100 per cent to avoid relegation. I gave up a lot of money, which not everyone would do. I left things on good terms with them, we have a good rapport." In spite of his previous comments, on 31 July, however, he stated that he would not be retiring, and that he was looking for a new club closer to home, but added that he would retire if he did not sign with a club by September. Although he received no other offers from Italian clubs, and was ultimately unable to sign for a team prior to the end of the summer transfer window, in September Cassano stated that he would be following a fitness training schedule given to him by his former Sampdoria fitness coach Agostino Tibaudi, and that he was hoping to sign for a club in the January transfer window. In spite of rumours in the media of Cassano being linked with several clubs for January, towards the end of September, he once again stated that he was "done" with football.

After a year of inactivity, in August 2018, Cassano announced that he was looking to return to football. In October 2018, it was confirmed he was about to start training with Serie C team Virtus Entella, a club he was already linked to in the past. In a prior interview a few days earlier, he had rejected reports linking him to Monza after Berlusconi's acquisition of the club, stating Virtus Entella would be the only club from outside of Serie A he would be willing to join. A few days later, however, he confirmed that he had officially retired from football.

== International career ==
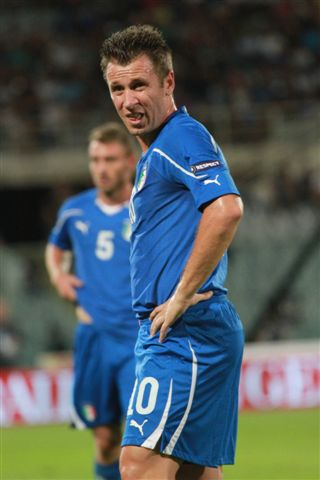
Cassano with the Italian team

Cassano made 39 appearances for the Italy national team, scoring ten goals. He made his senior international debut on 12 November 2003, aged 21, in a 3–1 friendly defeat against Poland in Warsaw, in which he also scored his first goal.

Cassano was included in Italy's UEFA Euro 2004 squad by manager Giovanni Trapattoni. He was initially thought to serve as a reserve, but after Francesco Totti was suspended following a spitting incident with Christian Poulsen in Italy's opening group match against Denmark, which ended in a 0–0 draw, Cassano was inserted into the starting lineup for a 1–1 draw with Sweden, in which he scored the opening goal. In Italy's final group match, which ended in a 2–1 victory over Bulgaria, he was named man of the match, as he was involved in Simone Perrotta's equaliser, and also netted the last-minute winner, but Italy were eliminated in the group stage on direct encounters after a three-way, five-point tie with Denmark and Sweden.

After a poor season with Real Madrid, Cassano was left off coach Marcello Lippi's final roster for the 2006 FIFA World Cup. The Azzurri went on to lift the trophy in Berlin, beating France in a penalty shootout.

In September 2006, Cassano was called up by new manager Roberto Donadoni for Euro 2008 qualifiers against Lithuania and France. However, he was not selected again until he was surprisingly being included in the Euro 2008 squad. He went scoreless in the tournament as Italy were eliminated in the quarter-finals by eventual champions Spain after a penalty shootout.

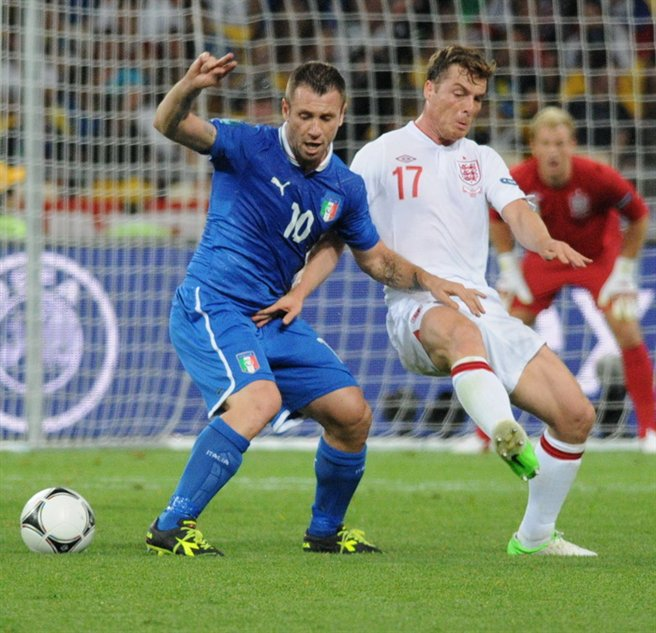
Cassano (left) at UEFA Euro 2012.

Lippi returned as coach for the 2010 World Cup qualification campaign and did not select Cassano during the qualifying matches or the 2010 World Cup finals. After a two-year absence from the Azzurri, and following widespread criticism from the media towards Lippi about his exclusion from the World Cup squad, Cassano was readmitted into the squad on 6 August 2010 by new head coach Cesare Prandelli for his first game in charge of the team, a friendly match against the Ivory Coast played on 10 August at Upton Park, London. Almost a month later, in Italy's Euro 2012 qualifier played in Estonia, Cassano scored the tying goal in a 1–2 away victory and also assisted Leonardo Bonucci's second goal with a back-heel. Cassano scored a long-range goal from just outside the box in Italy's 5–0 qualifying win over the Faroe Islands. He scored again against Estonia helping Italy secure a 3–0 win.

Cassano played in all six of Italy's matches and scored one goal against the Republic of Ireland during Euro 2012, where the Italians reached the final, losing 4–0 against Spain. In the semi-final against Germany, Cassano set up Mario Balotelli's first goal of the match. Cassano wore the number 10 shirt for Italy throughout the tournament. In July 2012, he was fined by UEFA for making a homophobic comment at a press conference during Euro 2012. At the conference, when asked if he thought there were any homosexual players in the Italian team, he replied, "I hope there are none." He later issued a statement saying he had been misinterpreted.

Despite not featuring during the qualification campaign, Cassano was selected in Italy's squad for the 2014 World Cup. On 20 June 2014, at the age of 31, Cassano made his World Cup debut as a substitute in a 1–0 loss to Costa Rica. He also appeared as a substitute in Italy's 1–0 defeat to Uruguay, in their final group match on 24 June, which resulted in Italy's elimination in the first round of the tournament for the second consecutive time. Cassano was criticised by the press for his poor performances and lack of fitness, as he failed to improve his team's results and did not provide pace and creativity to the team's attacking plays. This would be his final appearance for Italy, as he was no longer called up by Italy's new manager, Antonio Conte, after the tournament.

== Style of play ==
A creative forward, or fantasista, in Italian, who usually functioned as an assist provider in his teams, due to his ability to create chances for teammates (Cassano himself once stated that he preferred creating goals to scoring them), Cassano was capable of playing anywhere along or behind the front-line, on either flank or through the centre of the pitch; in addition to his usual role as a second striker, he was able to act as an advanced playmaker. He was also deployed in a central role as a main striker, as a false-9, or even as a winger on occasion. Cassano has been described as a player who was "skillful and intelligent on the ball" who possessed "excellent vision and also impresses with his eye for goal". His best technical qualities were his trapping skills, control, dribbling, crossing ability and passing accuracy; although naturally right-footed, he could also strike well with either foot. In addition to his skills, touch and excellent technique, Cassano also possessed considerable upper-body strength and balance, which aided him in defending the ball with his back to goal despite his diminutive stature, and allowed him to retain possession in tight spaces, while his technical ability and acceleration enabled him to beat defenders in one on one situations, or when dribbling at speed. He was also effective from set-pieces and penalties.

Despite his flair, ability and talent, throughout his career, Cassano was also criticised for his behaviour and lack of discipline, both on and off the pitch, which often led him to pick up unnecessary cards; he was also condemned for his poor work-rate and lack of fitness throughout different intervals of his career, which led him to gain weight, and lose some of his speed, stamina, and agility. Although he was initially regarded as one of the most promising young players of his generation, even being described as Roberto Baggio's heir, due to his inconsistency, difficult character, and unpredictability, many in the sport, including his former manager Fabio Capello, have argued that he did not live up to the potential he demonstrated in his youth, and that his personality affected his career.

== Post-retirement ==
During 2019, Cassano was a pundit for Italia 1 football show Tiki Taka.

In December 2019, Cassano successfully completed a director of football course at Coverciano.

He successively joined fellow friends and former Serie A footballers Christian Vieri, Daniele Adani and Nicola Ventola in a regular Twitch show named Bobo TV, which started in 2020 during the first COVID-19 lockdown in Italy.

== Personal life ==
Cassano got engaged to water polo player Carolina Marcialis in 2008, then married on 19 June 2010 at a church, Chiesa di San Martino, in Portofino. The couple have two sons.

On 30 October 2011, it was reported that Cassano complained of finding it difficult to speak or move on the team plane when the team returned to Milan. Three days later, his club Milan announced and confirmed that he was suffering from ischemic-based cerebral damage, though it was thought to be only temporary. Cassano underwent minor heart surgery soon after.

== Controversies ==
In addition to his skill, Cassano is known for his temper, poor behaviour and lack of discipline; these have led to several controversial incidents both on and off the pitch throughout his career, which have thus been dubbed Cassanate by the press and his former manager Capello.

During a Euro 2012 press conference, Cassano stated his preference for there to be no gay players on the squad and used a derogatory descriptor; he was subsequently fined by UEFA for making homophobic comments.

On 1 February 2013, Cassano had a locker room brawl with his then-coach at Inter, Andrea Stramaccioni. It occurred following Friday's training session and had started off as a relatively normal discussion before the pair got into a heated slanging match, then degenerated into pushing and shoving before the other players intervened to pull them apart.

== Sponsorship ==
Cassano was a brand ambassador for Diadora and wore their Evoluzione K Pro GX 14 football boots in black and fluorescent yellow throughout his career.

== Career statistics ==
=== Club ===
Club	Season	League			Cup		Europe		Total	
Club	Season	Division	Apps	Goals	Apps	Goals	Apps	Goals	Apps	Goals
Bari	1999–2000	Serie A	21	3	0	0	–		21	3
Bari	2000–01	Serie A	27	3	2	0	–		29	3
Bari	Total		48	6	2	0	–		50	6
Roma	2001–02	Serie A	22	5	3	1	5 (Note: Appearances in UEFA Champions League)	0	30	6
Roma	2002–03	Serie A	27	9	5	1	11	4	43	14
Roma	2003–04	Serie A	33	14	0	0	6 (Note: Appearances in UEFA Cup)	4	39	18
Roma	2004–05	Serie A	31	9	8	1	3	1	42	11
Roma	2005–06	Serie A	5	2	–		2	1	7	3
Roma	Total		118	39	16	3	27	10	161	52
Real Madrid	2005–06	La Liga	12	1	4	1	1	0	17	2
Real Madrid	2006–07	La Liga	7	1	1	1	4	0	12	2
Real Madrid	Total		19	2	5	2	5	0	29	4
Sampdoria	2007–08	Serie A	22	10	2	0	1	0	25	10
Sampdoria	2008–09	Serie A	35	12	4	1	6	2	45	15
Sampdoria	2009–10	Serie A	32	9	1	2	–		33	11
Sampdoria	2010–11	Serie A	7	4	–		3	1	10	5
Sampdoria	Total		96	35	7	3	12	3	115	41
Milan	2010–11	Serie A	17	4	4	0	–		21	4
Milan	2011–12	Serie A	16	3	0	0	3	1	19	4
Milan	Total		33	7	4	0	3	1	40	8
Inter Milan	2012–13	Serie A	28	7	2	1	9 (Note: Appearances in UEFA Europa League)	1	39	9
Parma	2013–14	Serie A	34	12	2	1	–		36	13
Parma	2014–15	Serie A	19	5	1	0	–		20	5
Parma	Total		53	17	3	1	–		56	18
Sampdoria	2015–16	Serie A	24	2	1	0	–		25	2
Sampdoria	2016–17	Serie A	0	0	0	0	–		0	0
Sampdoria	Total		24	2	1	0	–		25	2
Career total			419	115	40	10	56	15	514	140

=== International ===
Italy
Year	Apps	Goals
2003	2	1
2004	4	2
2005	2	0
2006	2	0
2007	0	0
2008	5	0
2009	0	0
2010	5	2
2011	8	4
2012	7	1
2013	0	0
2014	4	0
Total	39	10

Scores list Italy's tally first.

No.	Date	Venue	Opponent	Score	Result	Competition
1	12 November 2003	Warsaw, Poland	Poland	1–2	1–3	Friendly
2	18 June 2004	Porto, Portugal	Sweden	1–0	1–1	UEFA Euro 2004
3	22 June 2004	Guimarães, Portugal	Bulgaria	2–1	2–1	UEFA Euro 2004
4	3 September 2010	Tallinn, Estonia	Estonia	1–1	2–1	UEFA Euro 2012 qualifying
5	7 September 2010	Florence, Italy	Faroe Islands	3–0	5–0	UEFA Euro 2012 qualifying
6	3 June 2011	Modena, Italy	Estonia	2–0	3–0	UEFA Euro 2012 qualifying
7	2 September 2011	Tórshavn, Faroe Islands	Faroe Islands	1–0	1–0	UEFA Euro 2012 qualifying
8	11 October 2011	Pescara, Italy	Northern Ireland	1–0	3–0	UEFA Euro 2012 qualifying
9	11 October 2011	Pescara, Italy	Northern Ireland	2–0	3–0	UEFA Euro 2012 qualifying
10	18 June 2012	Gdańsk, Poland	Republic of Ireland	1–0	2–0	UEFA Euro 2012

== Honours ==
AS Roma

- Supercoppa Italiana: 2001

Real Madrid

- La Liga: 2006–07

AC Milan

- Serie A: 2010–11
- Supercoppa Italiana: 2011

Individual

- Serie A Young Footballer of the Year: 2001, 2003
