= Bonazzoli =

Bonazzoli is an Italian surname. Notable people with the surname include:

- Emiliano Bonazzoli (born 1979), Italian footballer
- Federico Bonazzoli (born 1997), Italian footballer

== See also ==
- 8742 Bonazzoli, a main-belt asteroid
