= Serie A Young Footballer of the Year =

Annual Italian Footballers' Association award

AIC Serie A Young Footballer of the Year
- Sport: Association football
- Competition: Serie A
- Awarded for: Young player considered to have performed the best in each given Serie A season
- Local name: Migliore calciatore giovane AIC (Italian)
- Country: Italy
- Presented by: Italian Footballers' Association (AIC)

History
- First award: 1997
- Editions: 14
- Final award: 2010
- First winner: (Italy) Filippo Inzaghi (1997)
- Most wins: (Italy) Antonio Cassano (2 times)
- Most recent: (Argentina) Javier Pastore (2010)
- Website: Official website

The AIC Serie A Young Footballer of the Year (Italian: Migliore calciatore giovane AIC) was a yearly award organized by the Italian Footballers' Association (AIC) given to the under-24 footballer who was considered to have performed the best over the previous Serie A season. It was organised by the Italian Footballers' Association (AIC) as part of the Oscar del Calcio awards event.

Antonio Cassano is the only multiple winner of the award, winning it in 2001 and 2003. Roma had the most winners with three players from the club winning the award. The first non-Italian to win the award was the Slovak Marek Hamšík in 2008.

== Winners ==
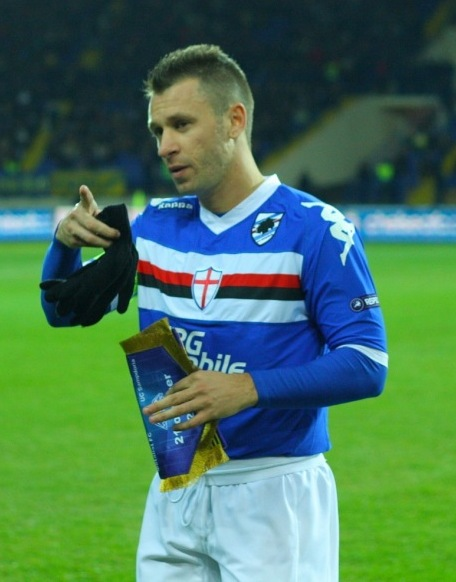
Antonio Cassano, who has won the Serie A Young Footballer of the Year award twice

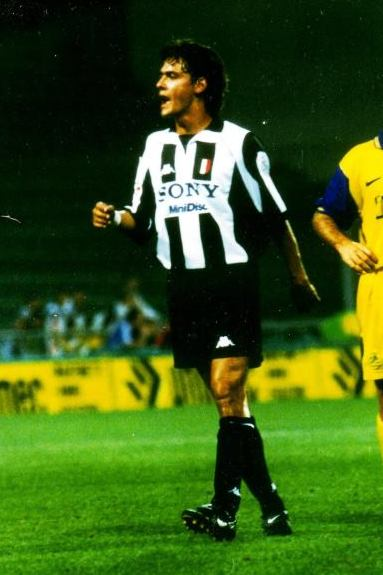
Filippo Inzaghi, who won the first award in 1997

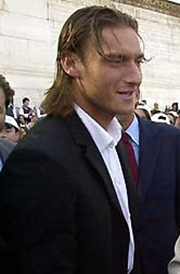
Francesco Totti, who won the award in 1999

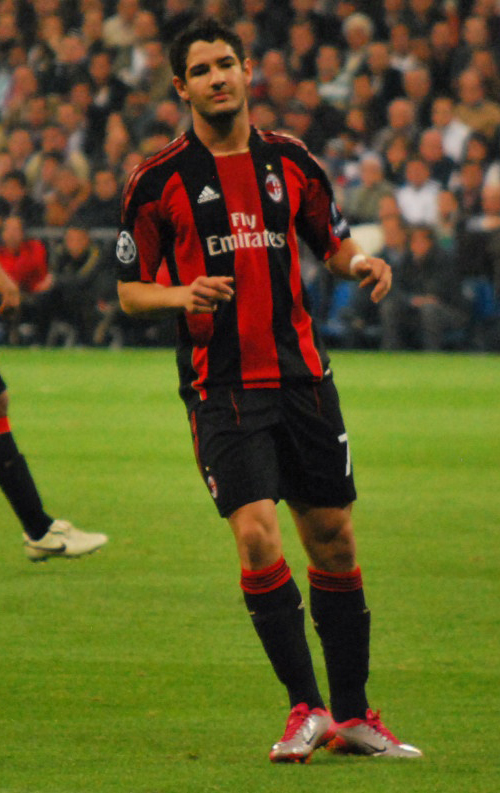
Alexandre Pato, who won the award in 2009

Year	Player	Club	Ref(s)
1997	(Italy) Filippo Inzaghi	Atalanta	
1998	(Italy) Alessandro Nesta	Lazio	
1999	(Italy) Francesco Totti	Roma	
2000	(Italy) Roberto Baronio	Reggina	
2001	(Italy) Antonio Cassano	Bari	
2002	(Italy) Matteo Brighi	Bologna	
2003	(Italy) Antonio Cassano	Roma	
2004	(Italy) Alberto Gilardino	Parma	
2005	(Italy) Giampaolo Pazzini	Fiorentina	
2006	(Italy) Daniele De Rossi	Roma	
2007	(Italy) Riccardo Montolivo	Fiorentina	
2008	(Slovakia) Marek Hamšík	Napoli	
2009	(Brazil) Alexandre Pato	Milan	
2010	(Argentina) Javier Pastore	Palermo	

=== By club ===
Club	Players	Total
Roma	3	3
Fiorentina	2	2
Atalanta	1	1
Bari	1	1
Bologna	1	1
Lazio	1	1
Milan	1	1
Napoli	1	1
Palermo	1	1
Parma	1	1
Reggina	1	1

=== By country ===
Country	Players	Total
Italy	10	12
Argentina	1	1
Brazil	1	1
Slovakia	1	1

=== By position ===
Position	Players	Total
Forward	6	7
Midfielder	6	6
Defender	1	1
