= Antonio Mirante =

Italian footballer (born 1983)

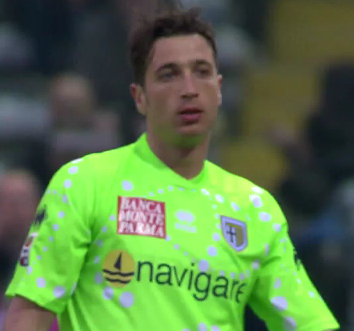
- Mirante playing for Parma in 2012

Personal information
- Full name: Antonio Mirante
- Date of birth: 8 July 1983 (age 43)
- Place of birth: Castellammare di Stabia, Italy
- Height: 1.93 m (6 ft 4 in)
- Position: Goalkeeper

Youth career
- 2003–2004: Juventus

Senior career*
Years	Team	Apps	(Gls)
2004–2008	Juventus	7	(0)
2004–2005	→ Crotone (loan)	41	(0)
2005–2006	→ Siena (loan)	26	(0)
2007–2008	→ Sampdoria (loan)	13	(0)
2008–2009	Sampdoria	9	(0)
2009–2015	Parma	204	(0)
2015–2018	Bologna	87	(0)
2018–2021	Roma	29	(0)
2021–2024	AC Milan	3	(0)
Total		419	(0)
- * Club domestic league appearances and goals

Antonio Mirante (born 8 July 1983) is an Italian former professional footballer who played as a goalkeeper.

== Club career ==
=== Juventus and loans ===
After starting his professional career with Juventus, Mirante was loaned to Crotone in 2004, along with Giovanni Bartolucci, Tomas Guzman, Abdoulay Konko, Matteo Paro and Daniele Gastaldello.

In 2005, he was loaned to Siena with Nicola Legrottaglie, Igor Tudor, Paro, Gastaldello, Douglas Ricardo Packer, Cristian Molinaro, Luca Cacciotto and Rej Volpato.

He returned to Juventus in 2006 due to the club's relegation to Serie B following their involvement in the 2006 Calciopoli Scandal; he was capped for the first time when first choice goalkeeper Gianluigi Buffon was red carded in the 24th minute against AlbinoLeffe, on 18 November 2006. Juventus won the 2006–07 Serie B title and obtained promotion to 2007–08 Serie A.

However, he was transferred to the Italian Serie A club Sampdoria on a one-year loan deal for the 2007–08 season on 3 July 2007.

=== Sampdoria ===
In the first season with Sampdoria, Mirante was an understudy of Luca Castellazzi. Nevertheless, at the end of the loan in June 2008, the club bought half of the registration rights of Mirante from Juventus for €1.5 million transfer fee.

In the second season, Mirante was still served as the understudy of Castellazzi; the co-ownership of Mirante between Juventus and Sampdoria was renewed in June 2009.

=== Parma ===
On 19 July 2009, he went on loan to Parma in exchange for defender Marco Rossi, both on temporary deals.

In June 2010, Sampdoria decided not to buy Rossi but sold Mirante to Parma. The Genoa club bought the remaining half of the player registration rights from Juventus for an additional €1.5 million fee and sold the full player registration rights to Parma for €3.6 million, despite also losing another one of its keepers, Castellazzi, to Internazionale on a Bosman transfer, and failing to sign shot-stopper Marco Storari from Milan, who had been on loan at the club.

After arrived in 2009, Mirante was the team's starting keeper until the club formally went bankrupt in June 2015.

=== Bologna ===
Mirante was signed by Bologna on a free transfer on 3 July 2015. He was the first choice of the team. On 19 July 2016, Mirante signed a new three-year contract. However, at the start of 2016–17 season he was diagnosed with a heart problem and had to undergo testing which ruled him out indefinitely; on 31 August 2016 the club signed Alfred Gomis on loan from Torino as an emergency replacement. After missing the next two and a half months of the season, he was finally cleared to play in mid-November. Mirante made his debut since his injury on 28 November 2016 against Atalanta. He was the captain of Bologna in 2017–18 season, his last season with the club.

=== Roma ===
On 22 June 2018, Mirante joined Roma from Bologna for €4 million transfer fee, signing a three-year contract; on the same day both clubs also announced that goalkeeper Łukasz Skorupski had joined Bologna from Roma for €9 million transfer fee, signing a five-year contract. Mirante visited Rome for a medical on 21 June and was presented with his number 83 shirt on the next day.

=== AC Milan ===
On 13 October 2021, Mirante signed a contract with AC Milan until 30 June 2022. On 1 July 2022, AC Milan announced the contract extension of Mirante until 30 June 2023. On June 4, 2023, he made his first Serie A appearance for Milan versus Hellas Verona as he came on for Mike Maignan in the game's final minutes.

On 7 July 2023, Mirante extended his contract with Milan for one more season until 30 June 2024.

In October 2023, ahead of the home game against Juventus, Mirante got a rare opportunity to start the game and play full 90 minutes, as both Mike Maignan and Marco Sportiello were unavailable for selection through suspension and injury, respectively. Despite Mirante making three saves, including a double save during added time, Milan lost 1–0, with Mirante conceding the only goal from Manuel Locatelli's deflected long shot. Although Milan lost, Mirante received praise for his performance by the club, supporters, and sports media.

== International career ==
Mirante was a member of Italy U-21 team in 2006 UEFA European Under-21 Football Championship, as an unused substitute. He has not made his debut for Italy at U-20 or U-21 level, despite having been called up a total of six times; similarly, he has yet to make his senior debut with Italy, despite having received ten call-ups.

On 8 August 2010, he received his first senior international call-up under manager Cesare Prandelli, to replace the injured Federico Marchetti.

Mirante was not included in Prandelli's final 23-man Italy squad for the 2014 FIFA World Cup; however, he was one of the two Italian reserve players alongside Andrea Ranocchia who was kept on the standby list prior to the start of the competition, as a precaution, in case of injury to any of the squad's final players, following an injury scare to back-up goalkeeper Salvatore Sirigu.

Under Antonio Conte, Mirante was called up to the national team for a training camp on 16 May 2016, ahead of the upcoming European Championships; however, later that month, he was not included in the manager's definitive 23-player squad for the final tournament.

In May 2019, he was called up by Roberto Mancini for Italy's European qualifiers against Greece and Bosnia and Herzegovina.

== Style of play ==
Regarded as one of the most promising Italian goalkeepers of his generation in his youth, Mirante was an experienced shot-stopper, who was known for his athleticism, reflexes, positioning, and goalkeeping technique, as well as his ability to save penalties; with 11 stops, he saved the 13th–highest number of penalties in Serie A history. A tall goalkeeper, with a large frame and a slender build, he also stood out for his aerial game and ability on high balls, while he was less effective at rushing off his line and getting to ground quickly to clear the ball away or deal with low balls and shots; as such, he was not particularly suited to playing as a sweeper-keeper. Due to his calm composure in goal and reserved character, Mirante's leadership and ability to organise his defence also came into question at times in the media. In addition to his goalkeeping ability, he was also comfortable with the ball at his feet.

== Career statistics ==
=== Club ===
Appearances and goals by club, season and competition
Club	Season	League			Coppa Italia		Europe		Other		Total	
Club	Season	Division	Apps	Goals	Apps	Goals	Apps	Goals	Apps	Goals	Apps	Goals
Juventus	2003–04	Serie A	0	0	0	0	0	0	—		0	0
Juventus	2006–07	Serie B	7	0	0	0	—		—		7	0
Juventus	Total		7	0	0	0	0	0	—		7	0
Crotone (loan)	2004–05	Serie B	41	0	3	0	—		—		44	0
Siena (loan)	2005–06	Serie A	26	0	3	0	—		—		29	0
Sampdoria (loan)	2007–08	Serie A	13	0	4	0	1	0	—		18	0
Sampdoria	2008–09	Serie A	9	0	2	0	2	0	—		13	0
Sampdoria	Sampdoria total		22	0	6	0	3	0	—		31	0
Parma	2009–10	Serie A	37	0	1	0	—		—		38	0
Parma	2010–11	Serie A	36	0	0	0	—		—		36	0
Parma	2011–12	Serie A	29	0	0	0	—		—		29	0
Parma	2012–13	Serie A	33	0	0	0	—		—		33	0
Parma	2013–14	Serie A	36	0	1	0	—		—		37	0
Parma	2014–15	Serie A	33	0	2	0	—		—		35	0
Parma	Total		204	0	4	0	—		—		208	0
Bologna	2015–16	Serie A	33	0	1	0	—		—		34	0
Bologna	2016–17	Serie A	21	0	1	0	—		—		22	0
Bologna	2017–18	Serie A	33	0	1	0	—		—		34	0
Bologna	Total		87	0	3	0	—		—		90	0
Roma	2018–19	Serie A	11	0	0	0	2	0	—		13	0
Roma	2019–20	Serie A	5	0	0	0	2	0	—		7	0
Roma	2020–21	Serie A	13	0	0	0	2	0	—		15	0
Roma	Total		29	0	0	0	6	0	—		35	0
AC Milan	2021–22	Serie A	0	0	0	0	0	0	—		0	0
AC Milan	2022–23	Serie A	1	0	0	0	0	0	0	0	1	0
AC Milan	2023–24	Serie A	2	0	1	0	0	0	—		3	0
AC Milan	Total		3	0	1	0	0	0	0	0	4	0
Career total			419	0	20	0	9	0	0	0	448	0

== Honours ==
Juventus

- Serie B: 2006–07

AC Milan

- Serie A: 2021–22
