= Riccardo Montolivo =

Italian footballer

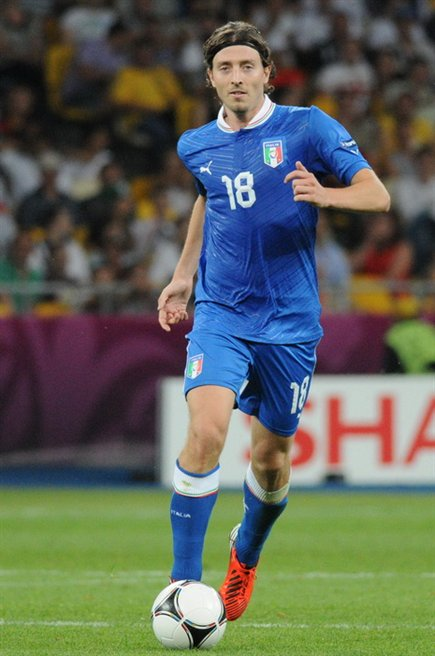
- Montolivo playing for Italy at the UEFA Euro 2012

Personal information
- Full name: Riccardo Montolivo
- Date of birth: 18 January 1985 (age 41)
- Place of birth: Milan, Italy
- Height: 1.82 m (6 ft 0 in)
- Position: Midfielder

Youth career
- 1992–2003: Atalanta

Senior career*
Years	Team	Apps	(Gls)
2003–2005	Atalanta	73	(7)
2005–2012	Fiorentina	219	(17)
2012–2019	AC Milan	129	(8)
Total		421	(32)

International career
2004–2007	Italy U21	20	(3)
2008	Italy Olympic	5	(1)
2007–2017	Italy	66	(2)
Medal record
Men's Football
Representing Italy
UEFA European Championship
Runner-up	2012 Poland–Ukraine
FIFA Confederations Cup
Third place	2013 Brazil
- * Club domestic league appearances and goals

Riccardo Montolivo (Italian pronunciation: [rikˈkardo montoˈliːvo]; born 18 January 1985) is an Italian former professional footballer who played as a midfielder. He most notably played for Fiorentina, AC Milan, and the Italy national team.

A versatile and creative player, Montolivo began his career with Atalanta in 2003 before joining Fiorentina in 2005. He went on to make more than 250 appearances for the club in seven years. In 2012, he signed for Milan on a free transfer and, following the departure of Massimo Ambrosini, served as the team's captain from 2013 until 2017, winning the 2016 Supercoppa Italiana. He left the club in the summer of 2019, before retiring later that year.

Montolivo made his debut for the Italy national team in 2007 against South Africa, Since then, he represented the country in two FIFA Confederations Cups (2009 and 2013, winning a bronze medal in the latter edition of the tournament), as well as in the 2010 FIFA World Cup and UEFA Euro 2012, the latter where he played as a starter in the final. He also participated in the 2008 Summer Olympics. In total, he obtained 66 senior caps for Italy between 2007 and 2017, scoring 2 goals.

== Club career ==
=== Atalanta ===
Montolivo is a graduate of the Atalanta youth academy. He made his debut for the club in a Serie B match against Piacenza, coming onto the pitch as an 81st-minute substitute for Michele Marcoliniego. His first starting match came in a 2–1 win against Hellas Verona. From that match onwards, he was frequently in the starting line-up, scoring his first goal against Bari in a 2–0 win. Atalanta finished the 2003–04 season in fifth position and were promoted to Serie A.

Montolivo missed the first matches of his debut season in Serie A because he was out with an injury. He made his Serie A debut in a 2–2 draw against Lecce. He scored goals in consecutive matches against Cagliari and Parma. On 23 January 2005, he received the first red card of his career in a match against Lecce. Atalanta finished last in the 2004–05 Serie A and was relegated. Montolivo won 32 caps and scored three goals in his debut season in the Serie A.

=== Fiorentina ===
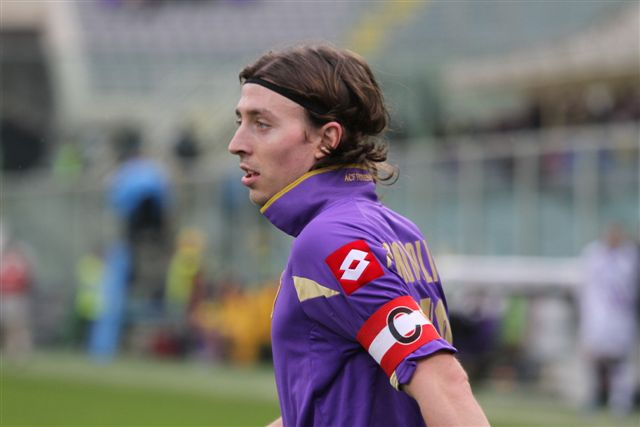
Montolivo as Fiorentina captain in 2011

In the summer of 2005, Fiorentina signed Montolivo in a co-ownership deal for €3.5 million. He subsequently signed a five-year contract. He was given the jersey number 18. During the 2005–06 season, Montolivo's first-team chances were limited, partly due to the fact he was still an inexperienced player and partly because manager Cesare Prandelli had a relatively stable and reliable squad of players at his disposal. However, Montolivo's talent did not go unrecognised – he became a regular fixture in the Italy national under-21 team, coached by Pierluigi Casiraghi. Montolivo eventually made his Fiorentina debut in a 2–1 loss to Internazionale.

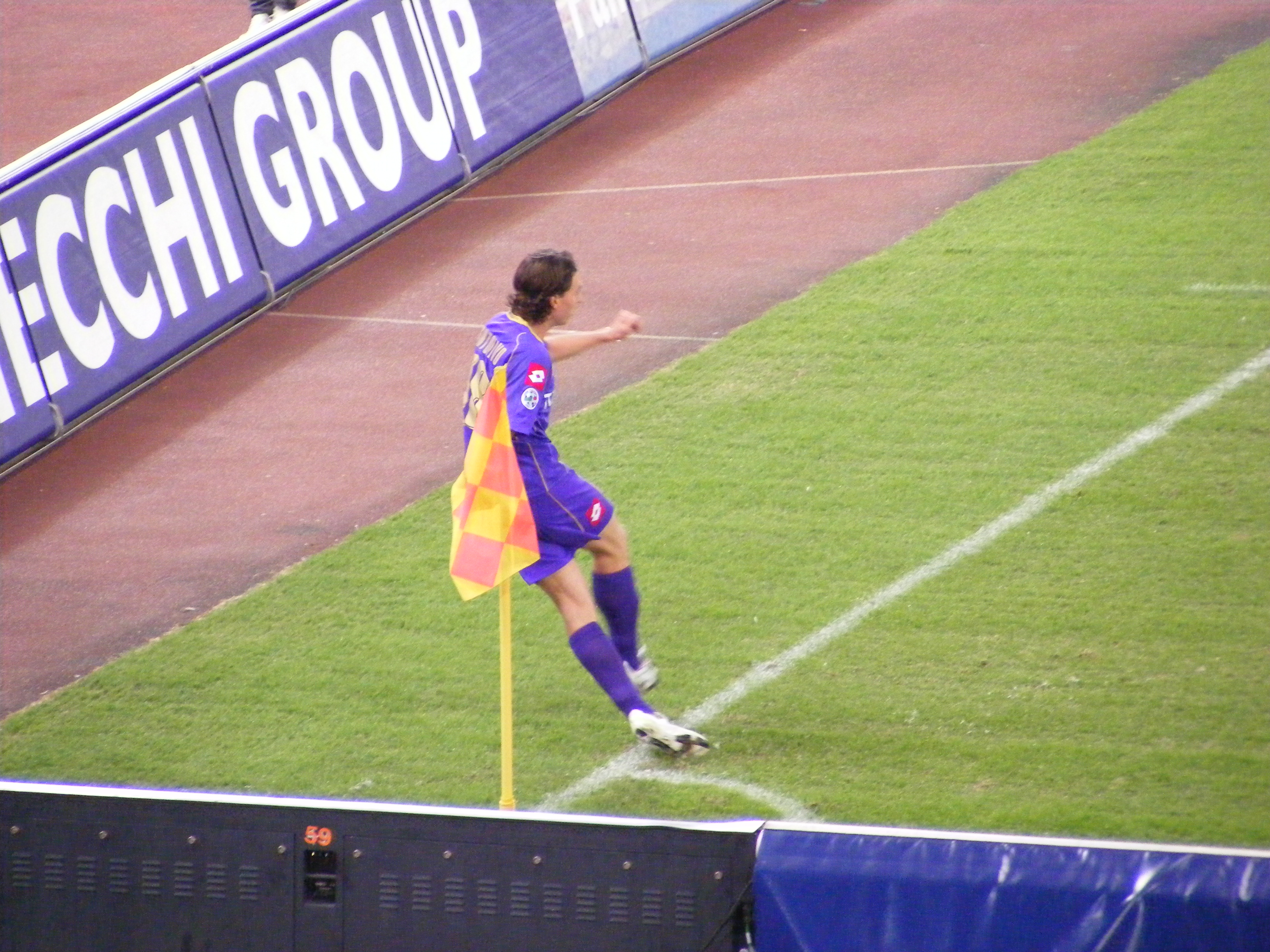
Montolivo taking a corner against Lazio

Despite being associated with the Calciopoli scandal, Fiorentina signed Montolivo on a permanent basis the following season for €2 million. He played a total of 36 matches for Fiorentina, scoring two goals. At the end of the 2006–07 season, Montolivo was presented with the Serie A Young Footballer of the Year award. In the first game of the 2007–08 season against Empoli, he scored a goal with a lob.

His good form earned him a spot for the Summer Olympics in Beijing. As he sustained an injury while playing in the competition, he missed the first round of 2008–09 Serie A, against Juventus. He scored a crucial brace as Fiorentina defeated Udinese 4–2 after being down 0–1 in the first half. Montolivo scored two more goals against Sampdoria and Napoli and he ended the season with two goals, two more than his previous season. On 17 January 2009, he captained Fiorentina for the first time in a 1–0 defeat to AC Milan.

In the 2009–10 season, Montolivo was made club captain following the departure of Dario Dainelli. Montolivo also expressed that the departure of Dainelli and Martin Jørgensen had weakened the team, but with Sébastien Frey and Marco Donadel, he formed a strong midfield. Despite gaining attention from big clubs he said that Fiorentina was his house and he would not change his club.

Again, the next season started with injury for Montolivo — he had a small problem with his ankle. However, he was operated and it was remedied. His form saw him included in Italian squad for 2010 FIFA World Cup. He scored goals against Palermo and Cesena as he ended the season with 2 goals in 29 matches.

At the beginning of his last season in Fiorentina, 2011–12, Montolivo said he would leave Fiorentina after his contract expired, expressing an intent to play for a club of higher calibre. As a result, he was stripped of his captaincy and replaced by Alessandro Gamberini, with Stevan Jovetić as vice-captain. Montolivo made his 200th appearance for the club in a 2–0 loss against Palermo on 27 November 2011.

=== AC Milan ===
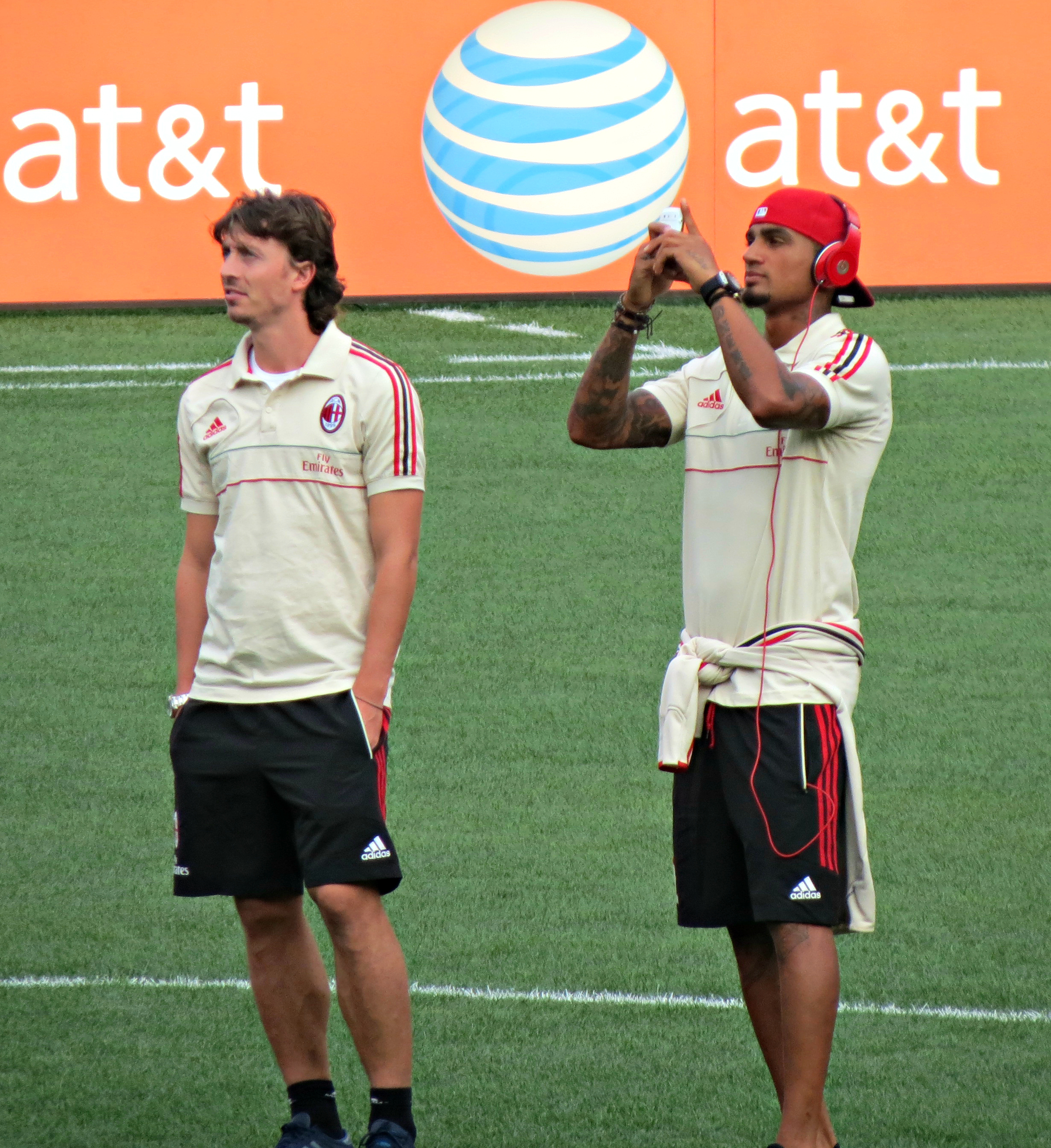
Montolivo with Kevin-Prince Boateng in 2012

In May 2012, Milan head coach Massimiliano Allegri announced Montolivo would join the club on a free transfer when his contract with Fiorentina expired on 30 June. Montolivo then signed a four-year contract with the club. "Next season, Montolivo will arrive and he is a very talented player with great technique," said Allegri to Milan Channel. He chose to wear the number 18 jersey which he had worn before and which was last worn by Alberto Aquilani in Milan.

As Milan signed striker Giampaolo Pazzini in August 2012, Montolivo once again reunited with his long-term teammate of the past, with whom he had spent several seasons playing for Atalanta and Fiorentina, both of his two former clubs.

In the Milan derby though he was highly praised for his performance, the referee disallowed a stunning 30-yard volley by Montolivo due to a challenge committed by Urby Emanuelson. On 30 October, Montolivo scored his first goal for Milan, coming in the 69th minute after Milan were down 2–0 to Palermo. Milan eventually drew the match 2–2, salvaging a point. On 25 November, in a 1–0 win against Juventus, Montolivo played his first match as Milan's captain as Daniele Bonera and Massimo Ambrosini were suspended while Christian Abbiati was out injured. He ended the first season at the club by becoming one of the two (the other being Stephan El Shaarawy) most-used players of the season. On 11 June 2013, Milan vice-president Adriano Galliani stated Montolivo would be the next captain for Milan after previously announcing that current club captain Massimo Ambrosini would not be extending his contract with the Rossoneri. After earning the captaincy, Montolivo opened his account by scoring against Catania. He then scored in a 4–3 defeat to Sassuolo. On 13 April 2014, he scored an astonishing long-range strike in the 23rd minute against Catania, which extended Milan's winning streak to four matches. After breaking his leg in a pre-2014 World Cup friendly match against the Republic of Ireland on 31 May, Montolivo was ruled out for six months. On 30 November, he made his return in a 2–0 home win over Udinese, coming on as a substitute in the 88th minute. Following the Chinese takeover of the club, in the summer of 2017, Montolivo was stripped of his captaincy against his wishes in favor of Leonardo Bonucci, who had just been signed at the time. Complying with the club management board's decision, Montolivo still made 26 appearances in all competitions during the 2017–18 season, including the one in the Coppa Italia final on 9 May 2018, which subsequently became his last as a professional.

Ahead of the 2018–19 season, head coach Gennaro Gattuso excluded Montolivo from the senior squad for "technical reasons". However, following a long-term injury to Lucas Biglia, Montolivo returned to the squad in November. Nonetheless, despite making 22 appearances on the team's substitutions bench, he was never fielded in what would become his final season as a player. He left the club upon the expiration of his contract on 30 June 2019.

On 13 November 2019, Montolivo announced his retirement from football.

== International career ==
=== Youth teams ===
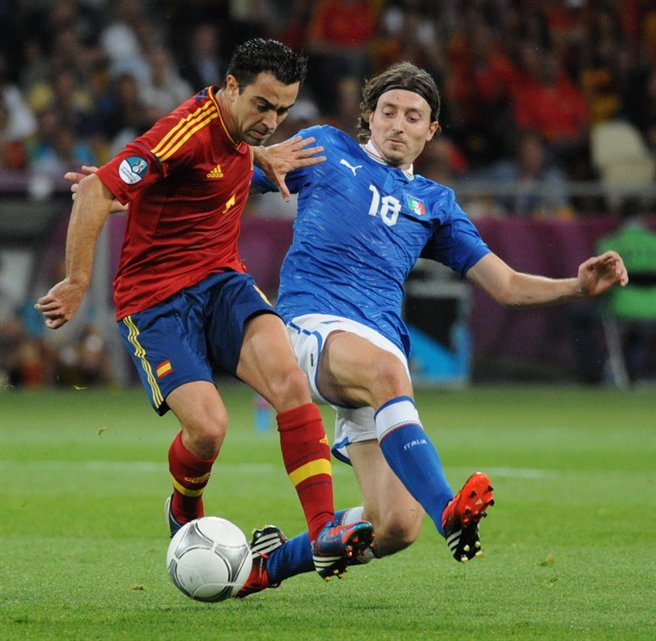
Montolivo tackling Spain's Xavi in the UEFA Euro 2012 Final

Montolivo represented Italy at under-16, under-18, under-19, and under-21 levels before receiving his first cap for the senior team in 2007.

Montolivo scored the winning goal when Italy's under-21 team defeated Spain 2–1 and qualified for the 2007 UEFA European Under-21 Championship on 10 October 2006. One year and seven days later, he made his debut for the senior team in a 2–0 friendly win against South Africa. Despite being ineligible for the 2007–08 season of the under-21 team, Montolivo capped once for the de facto Olympic team against the Dutch Olympic team in February 2008, where he was eligible for Beijing as underage player.

Montolivo was included in Italy's provisional squad for the UEFA Euro 2008 by head coach Roberto Donadoni. However, he was omitted from the final 23-man squad. The same summer, Pierluigi Casiraghi called-up Montolivo to participate in the Olympic Games in Beijing. He scored one goal in four appearances as Italy were eliminated in the quarter-finals by Belgium.

=== Senior team ===
In October 2007, Montolivo was called by Roberto Donadoni to face Georgia in Euro 2008 qualifiers. He did not play in that match but made his debut in a 2–1 win in a friendly against South Africa. In May 2008, Montolivo was included in Italy's preliminary squad for the Euro 2008 final stages, but he was omitted from the final 23-man squad. However, Donadoni said Montolivo would be a key part of Italy's midfield in the future. Montolivo's second appearance came over a year after the first, against Bulgaria in the 2010 FIFA World Cup qualification.

In June 2009, Montolivo was selected to play in the 2009 FIFA Confederations Cup. Italy were eliminated at the group stage. Montolivo started the match against Brazil but played the other two matches as a substitute. In 2010, Montolivo was named in Marcello Lippi's squad for the 2010 World Cup. Due to the injury sustained by Andrea Pirlo, he started Italy's first two group matches against Paraguay and New Zealand. In the third match, Montolivo was again in the starting line-up but was replaced by Pirlo in the 56th minute, as the Azzurri lost 3–2 to Slovakia and were eliminated.

Montolivo scored his first senior international goal in a 2–1 friendly win against Spain in Bari. Montolivo was named to Italy's 23-man squad for Euro 2012, and made four appearances throughout the tournament, playing as a false attacking midfielder in Prandelli's 4–3–1–2 formation. Italy progressed to the final, where they lost to Spain. In the quarter-final match against England, he missed his penalty in the resulting shoot-out, following a 0–0 draw after extra-time, although Italy still advanced to the next round following a 4–2 victory in the shoot-out. In the semi-final match against Germany, he assisted Mario Balotelli's second goal of the match with a long ball, as the Italians advanced to the final after a 2–1 win.

Montolivo was called up to Italy's 23-man squad for the 2013 Confederations Cup. He appeared in all five of his team's matches, including the third-place play-off against Uruguay, during which he was sent off after receiving a double booking. Italy nonetheless won the match on penalties, earning the bronze medal.

Montolivo was named in Italy's 30-man preliminary squad for the 2014 World Cup under Cesare Prandelli, but was ruled out of the tournament after suffering a broken leg in a friendly match against the Republic of Ireland at Craven Cottage, London, on 31 May.

After initially being named to Antonio Conte's 30-man provisional squad for Euro 2016, on 31 May 2016, Montolivo was omitted from the final 23-man squad due to injury. He returned to the national team under Conte's successor, Giampiero Ventura, making a substitute appearance in a 3–1 friendly home defeat to France on 1 September. However, in Italy's second 2018 World Cup qualifying match on 6 October, a 1–1 home draw against Spain, he was forced off with yet another injury. It was later revealed he suffered an anterior cruciate ligament injury to his left knee, which would rule him out for six months.

== Style of play ==
Montolivo has been described as a versatile player capable of playing anywhere in the midfield, especially on center positions. Originally a sweeper, he was moved higher up the pitch in his early teenage years. His main and favoured role is in the centre as a deep-lying playmaker, which best utilises his technical ability, creativity, vision, and range of passing, although he is also capable of playing as an attacking midfielder, even though this is not his preferred position. He also possesses an accurate and powerful shot from outside the penalty area. With the Italy national team, under Cesare Prandelli, Montolivo also played in a new role as false attacking midfielder in a 4–3–1–2 formation, in particular at Euro 2012; he has also been fielded in the "mezzala" role. In recent years, he has also been praised for his work-rate, physical qualities and for his defensive attributes, including his ability to read the game, intercept loose balls, break down possession and subsequently start attacking plays, which led manager Siniša Mihajlović to deploy him in a holding role as a ball-winner. However, Montolivo has also drawn criticism at times for his lack of pace, and has been accused of being inconsistent, and of lacking leadership qualities, despite having served as Milan's captain. He has also struggled with injuries throughout his career.

== Personal life ==
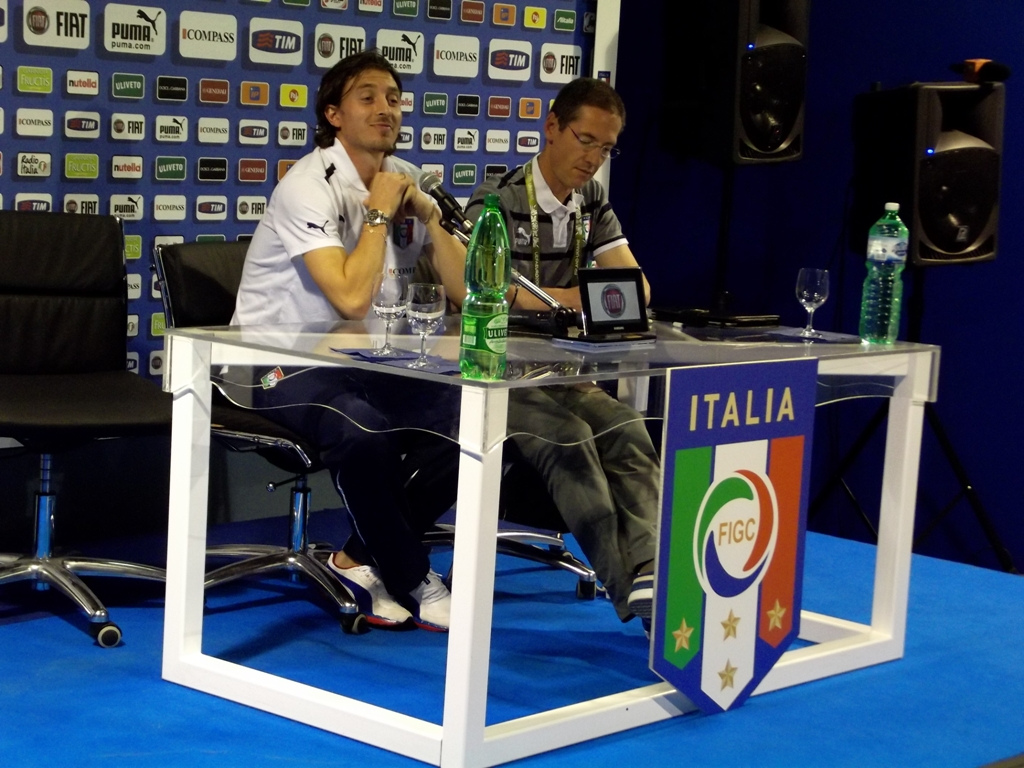
Montolivo at a press conference

Montolivo was born to a German mother and an Italian father in Milan, soon before his family moved to Caravaggio, where he spent most of his childhood. He has an older brother Luca who is a lawyer. Montolivo is an atheist.

In addition to holding an Italian passport, Montolivo also holds a German passport – his mother, Antje, was born in Kiel and later moved to Ascheberg and his maternal grandparents are from Heidkate at the Kieler Förde on the Baltic Sea coast, where he spent all of his summers as a child. In addition to Italian, Montolivo also speaks fluent German. In his youth, he looked upon Francesco Totti, Zinedine Zidane and Frank Lampard as his idols.

On 22 May 2014, Montolivo married the Florentine model and presenter Cristina De Pin, with whom he had been engaged since 2007. The couple has two children, Mariam, born on 12 May 2016, and Mathias, born 20 October 2018.

== Career statistics ==
=== Club ===
Appearances and goals by club, season and competition
Club	Season	League			Cup		Europe		Total	
Club	Season	Division	Apps	Goals	Apps	Goals	Apps	Goals	Apps	Goals
Atalanta	2003–04	Serie B	41	4	1	0	0	0	42	4
Atalanta	2004–05	Serie A	32	3	5	0	0	0	38	3
Atalanta	2005–06	Serie B	0	0	2	0	0	0	2	0
Atalanta	Total		73	7	9	0	0	0	82	7
Fiorentina	2005–06	Serie A	20	1	2	0	0	0	22	1
Fiorentina	2006–07	Serie A	36	2	0	0	0	0	36	2
Fiorentina	2007–08	Serie A	34	2	2	0	11 (Note: Appearances in the UEFA Europa League)	1	47	3
Fiorentina	2008–09	Serie A	34	4	0	0	8 (Note: Six appearances in the UEFA Champions League, two in the UEFA Europa League)	0	42	4
Fiorentina	2009–10	Serie A	36	2	4	0	10 (Note: Appearances in the UEFA Champions League)	1	50	3
Fiorentina	2010–11	Serie A	29	2	0	0	0	0	29	2
Fiorentina	2011–12	Serie A	30	4	3	0	0	0	33	4
Fiorentina	Total		219	17	11	0	29	2	259	19
AC Milan	2012–13	Serie A	32	4	1	0	6	0	39	4
AC Milan	2013–14	Serie A	29	3	1	0	7	0	37	3
AC Milan	2014–15	Serie A	10	0	2	0	–	–	12	0
AC Milan	2015–16	Serie A	31	0	4	0	–	–	35	0
AC Milan	2016–17	Serie A	9	0	0	0	–	–	9	0
AC Milan	2017–18	Serie A	18	1	3	0	5 (Note: Appearances in the UEFA Europa League)	2	26	3
AC Milan	2018–19	Serie A	0	0	0	0	0	0	0	0
AC Milan	Total		129	8	10	0	18	2	158	10
Career total			421	32	30	0	47	4	499	36

=== International ===
Appearances and goals by national team and year
National team	Year	Apps	Goals
Italy	2007	1	0
Italy	2008	2	0
Italy	2009	8	0
Italy	2010	8	0
Italy	2011	12	1
Italy	2012	9	1
Italy	2013	16	0
Italy	2014	2	0
Italy	2015	3	0
Italy	2016	3	0
Italy	2017	2	0
Total		66	2

Scores and results list Italy's goal tally first, score column indicates score after each Montolivo goal.

List of international goals scored by Riccardo Montolivo
No.	Date	Venue	Opponent	Score	Result	Competition
1	10 August 2011	Stadio San Nicola, Bari, Italy	Spain	1–0	2–1	Friendly
2	16 October 2012	San Siro, Milan, Italy	Denmark	1–0	3–1	2014 FIFA World Cup qualification

== Honours ==
AC Milan

- Supercoppa Italiana: 2016

Italy

- UEFA European Championship: runner-up 2012
- FIFA Confederations Cup: third place 2013

Individual

- Serie A Young Footballer of the Year: 2007
- Player Career Award in the Globe Soccer Awards: 2014
