= Gennaro Delvecchio =

Italian footballer (born 1978)

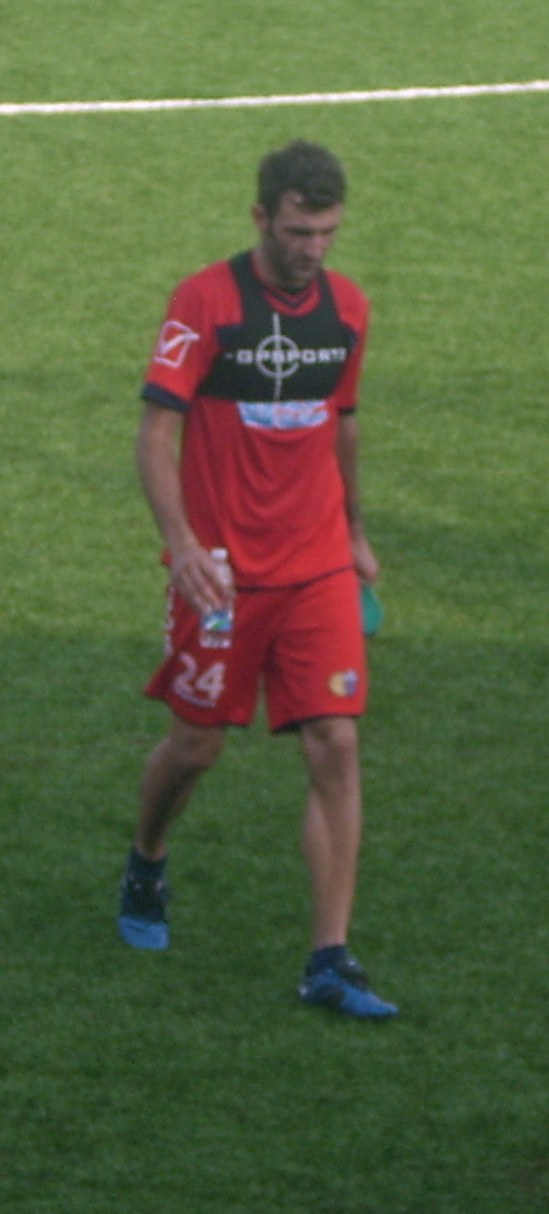

Personal information
- Date of birth: 25 March 1978 (age 48)
- Place of birth: Barletta, Italy
- Height: 1.86 m (6 ft 1 in)
- Position: Midfielder

Team information
- Current team: Bari (youth development)

Youth career
- 1994–1995: Barletta
- 1995–1998: Melfi

Senior career*
Years	Team	Apps	(Gls)
1998–1999	Giulianova	1	(0)
1999–2000	Castrovillari	29	(3)
2000–2004	Catania	27	(8)
2000–2001	→ Catanzaro (loan)	26	(2)
2001–2003	→ Sambenedettese (loan)	52	(7)
2004–2005	Perugia	33	(6)
2005–2009	Sampdoria	85	(13)
2005–2006	→ Lecce (loan)	29	(4)
2009–2012	Catania	36	(1)
2011	→ Atalanta (loan)	15	(1)
2012	Lecce	16	(0)
2012–2013	Grosseto	31	(6)
2014	Bari	16	(1)
Total		398	(52)

International career
2006	Italy	1	(0)

Managerial career
- 2017–: Bari (youth development)
- * Club domestic league appearances and goals

Gennaro Delvecchio (Italian pronunciation: [dʒenˈnaːro delˈvɛkkjo]; born 25 March 1978) is an Italian football official and a former player who played as a midfielder. He works as the head of youth development at Bari.

== Club career ==
=== Early career ===
Delvecchio started his career with amateur club A.S.D. Barletta in 1994. The following season, he joined A.S. Melfi. He would remain at the club until 1998. With Melfi, Delvecchio managed 15 goals in a total of 83 appearances. Following that impressive spell, he was bought by Serie C1 side Giulianova Calcio. Although he would only appear once for the club. The following season (1999), he joined U.S. Castrovillari Calcio. He again picked up form and scored 3 goals in 29 appearances for the club at Serie C2.

=== Catania and Perugia ===
In 2000, he joined Serie C1 side Calcio Catania, but he was loaned to F.C. Catanzaro in October. With Catanzaro he appeared in 26 games and added two goals to his credit. He then joined S.S. Sambenedettese Calcio on loan and again would pick up form, scoring 7 goals in 52 league matches. Delvecchio also reached into the promotion playoffs, in although lost to Pescara Calcio in the semi-final. Delvecchio returned to Catania in 2003–04 season. With Catania, he made 27 appearances in Serie B. At the end of season, he joined Perugia. Although Perugia went bankrupt in 2005, his performance made U.C. Sampdoria of Serie A offer him a contract. Without experience in Italian top division, he was loaned to U.S. Lecce, also in Serie A.

=== Sampdoria ===
In Lecce, he acquired 29 Serie A appearances with 4 goals. He would then return to U.C. Sampdoria for the following season. He appeared 85 times for the Liguria based club in Serie A and scored 13 times. It was by far his best spell at one club and the best period of his career.

=== Return to Catania ===
On 30 June 2009, he was re-signed by Catania; the contract lasted until June 2012. However, after a decent start to the campaign, Delvecchio was forced out by injury, and eventually needed surgery, before a 2010 return. Following his injury, Delvecchio never regained a starting position, and in January 2011 he was loaned out to Serie B outfit, Atalanta. In his six-month spell with the Bergamasca side, Delvecchio scored 1 goal in 15 appearances, helping Atalanta win the Serie B championship and hence, gain promotion to the Serie A. On 30 June 2011, Delvecchio returned to Catania.

== International career ==
Delvecchio was first capped by Italy national team head coach Roberto Donadoni for a friendly match against Croatia, which was lost 2–0 at home, on 16 August 2006. Sampdoria teammates Giulio Falcone, Angelo Palombo and Christian Terlizzi also made their debut on the same match. He was also selected for Euro 2008 qualification matches against Lithuania and France in September and matches against Ukraine and Georgia in October, but did not make any appearances.

== Honours ==
Sambenedettese

- Serie C2 Promotion Playoffs: 2002
