= Marco Padalino =

Swiss footballer (born 1983)

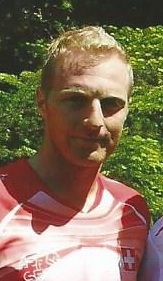

Personal information
- Full name: Marco Padalino
- Date of birth: 8 December 1983 (age 42)
- Place of birth: Lugano, Switzerland
- Height: 1.77 m (5 ft 10 in)
- Position: Midfielder

Youth career
- 1998–2002: FC.Rapid Lugano

Senior career*
| Years | Team | Apps | (Gls) |
| 2002–2003 | Lugano | 8 | (0) |
| 2003 | Malcantone Agno | 10 | (0) |
| 2004–2005 | Catania | 34 | (2) |
| 2005–2008 | Piacenza | 83 | (5) |
| 2008–2012 | Sampdoria | 65 | (3) |
| 2012–2014 | Vicenza | 52 | (1) |
| 2014–2018 | Lugano | 48 | (0) |
| Total | | 290 | (11) |

International career
| | Switzerland U-19 | 4 | (0) |
| 2009–2014 | Switzerland | 9 | (1) |
- * Club domestic league appearances and goals

Marco Padalino (born 8 December 1983) is a Swiss former professional footballer who played as a midfielder. He played for Malcantone Agno, Catania, Piacenza, Sampdoria and Vicenza, and Lugano. A Swiss international from 2009 to 2014, he represented Switzerland at the 2010 and 2014 FIFA World Cups. Originally an attacking midfielder, he played as a winger in his later career.

== Personal life ==
Padalino was born in Switzerland and is of Italian descent.
