= Emiliano Bonazzoli =

Italian football manager (born 1979)

Personal information
- Date of birth: 20 January 1979 (age 47)
- Place of birth: Asola, Italy
- Height: 1.92 m (6 ft 4 in)
- Position: Striker

Team information
- Current team: Lecco (head coach)

Youth career
- 1993–1997: Brescia

Senior career*
Years	Team	Apps	(Gls)
1997–2000	Brescia	53	(10)
1999	→ Cesena (loan)	21	(1)
2000–2003	Parma	36	(8)
2000–2001	→ Verona (loan)	28	(7)
2003–2005	Reggina	77	(17)
2005–2009	Sampdoria	83	(16)
2009	→ Fiorentina (loan)	12	(1)
2009–2012	Reggina	94	(25)
2013	Padova	11	(3)
2013–2014	Marano	4	(0)
2014	Budapest Honvéd	9	(0)
2014–2015	Este	9	(0)
2015	Miami Fusion	0	(0)
2015	Siena	14	(4)
2016	Cittadella	10	(0)
Total		461	(92)

International career
1996–1997	Italy U18	9	(7)
1996–1997	Italy U19	14	(2)
1998–1999	Italy U20	3	(0)
1998–2002	Italy U21	17	(8)
2006	Italy	1	(0)

Managerial career
- 2016–2017: Atletico Conselve
- 2017–2018: Thermal Teolo
- 2018–2019: Chievo (women)
- 2019–2020: Hellas Verona (women)
- 2022–2023: Fanfulla
- 2023–2024: Lecco
- * Club domestic league appearances and goals

Emiliano Bonazzoli (Italian pronunciation: [emiˈljaːno bonatˈtsɔːli]; born 20 January 1979) is a former Italian footballer who played as a striker.

== Playing career ==
Bonazzoli started his career at Brescia. He played his first professional match on 15 May 1997 against Lecce; in the next two seasons, he occasionally played for the first and youth teams. In the second half of the 1998–99 season, he left for league rival Cesena.

Bonazzoli was signed by Parma in a co-ownership deal in 1999. He was loaned back to Brescia and scored nine league goals for the team.

=== Parma ===
In June 2000, Parma bought all remaining registration rights from Brescia. He played the opening match on 1 October 2000, then left on loan to league rival Verona.

Bonazzoli returned to Parma and played 1 1/2 seasons for the team.

=== Reggina ===
Bonazzoli was sent on loan to Reggina in January 2003. At the end of the season, the club signed him in a co-ownership deal for €925,000.

=== Sampdoria ===
In the summer of 2005, he was loaned to Sampdoria along with Marco Zamboni, which Bonazzoli secured a permanent move from Parma and Reggina in summer 2006. He suffered from injuries, and at the start of 2007–08 Serie A, Andrea Caracciolo was signed to replace him.

He scored four goals in a UEFA Cup match for Sampdoria; on 14 January 2009, he was loaned to Fiorentina in exchange for Giampaolo Pazzini.

=== Return to Reggina ===
In July 2009, Bonazzoli signed a contract with Reggina to seek more playing time as a starter. He only valued €850,000 at that time.

He was excluded from the squad for the start of the 2012–13 Serie B season.

=== Padova ===
In November 2012, he joined Calcio Padova, which became official at the start of the January transfer window.

=== Marano ===
In September 2013, Bonazzoli was signed by the Serie D club, SSD Calcio Marano.

=== Budapest Honvéd ===
In January 2014, Bonazzoli was signed by the Hungarian League club, Budapest Honvéd FC.

=== Este ===
In July 2014, Bonazzoli was signed by the Hungarian League club, AC Este.

=== Miami Fusion ===
In May 2015, Bonazzoli was signed by the National Premier Soccer League club, Miami Fusion FC.

=== Siena ===
In July 2015, Bonazzoli was signed by the Lega Pro club, Siena.

=== Cittadella ===
On 29 December 2015, Bonazzoli was signed by fellow third-tier club Cittadella after being released by Siena.

== International career ==
Bonazzoli was a member of Italy's U-18 team (now called U19 team) at the 1996 UEFA European Under-18 Championship Final tournament, the Italy U-21 team that won the 2002 UEFA European Under-21 Championship. He was first called up for the Italy squad in September 2006 for Euro 2008 qualifying qualification matches against Lithuania and France, but did not play in any of those. He finally made his international debut in a friendly against Turkey on 15 November 2006.

== Managerial career ==
In 2016, Bonazzoli started his coaching career with Prima Categoria amateurs Atletico Conselve, then joining Promozione club Thermal Teolo afterwards.

In 2018, he embarked on a coaching career with women's football, being appointed in charge of Chievo Women for the 2018–19 Serie A season. This was followed by a stint at Hellas Verona Women the following season.

In 2020, Bonazzoli joined the coaching staff of Serie C club Renate as a technical collaborator. In January 2022, he was appointed in charge of Serie D club Fanfulla, a position he left in February 2023.

On 12 October 2023, Bonazzoli took on his first position as a professional head coach, being appointed in charge of bottom-placed Serie B club Lecco. He was dismissed on 12 February 2024, leaving Lecco still at the bottom of the table by the time of his departure.

== Managerial statistics ==
As of 24 November 2023

Managerial record by team and tenure
Team	From	To	Record							
Team	From	To	G	W	D	L	GF	GA	GD	Win %
Fanfulla	7 January 2022	27 February 2023	53	20	12	21	67	76	−9	37.74
Lecco	12 October 2023	Present	6	3	2	1	8	7	+1	50.00
Total			59	23	14	22	75	83	−8	38.98

== Honours ==
Brescia

- Serie B: 1996–97

Parma

- Coppa Italia: 2001–02
