= Angelo Palombo =

Italian footballer (born 1981)

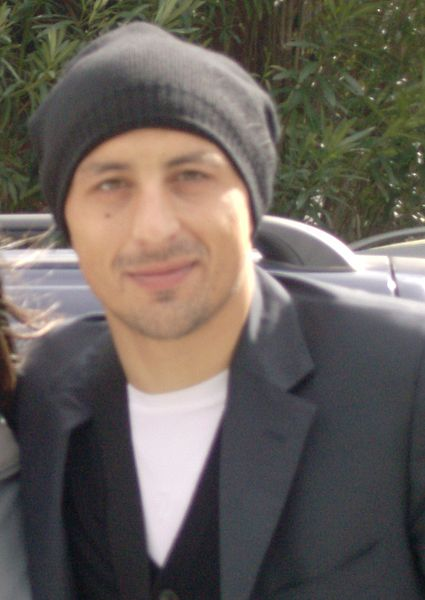
- Palombo in 2010

Personal information
- Full name: Angelo Palombo
- Date of birth: 25 September 1981 (age 45)
- Place of birth: Ferentino, Italy
- Height: 1.77 m (5 ft 10 in)
- Position: Defensive midfielder

Youth career
- 1993–: AS Ferentino
- 1997–1998: Urbania Calcio
- 1998–1999: Fano
- 1999–2001: Fiorentina

Senior career*
Years	Team	Apps	(Gls)
2001–2002	Fiorentina	10	(0)
2002–2017	Sampdoria	411	(13)
2012	→ Inter Milan (loan)	3	(0)
Total		424	(13)

International career
	Italy U20	19	(0)
2002–2004	Italy U21	18	(0)
2006–2011	Italy	22	(0)
Medal record
Men's football
Representing Italy
Olympic Games
Bronze medal – third place	2004 Athens	Team competition
UEFA European Under-21 Championship
Winner	2004
- * Club domestic league appearances and goals

Angelo Palombo Cavaliere OMRI (Italian pronunciation: [ˈandʒelo paˈlombo]; born 25 September 1981) is an Italian former professional footballer who played as a midfielder. Throughout his club career, he played for Fiorentina, Sampdoria, and Inter Milan in Serie A. The vast majority of that time was spent at Sampdoria where he was club captain and played a total of nearly 15 years.

Palombo won 22 caps for Italy at full international level between 2006 and 2011, and represented his nation at the 2009 FIFA Confederations Cup and the 2010 FIFA World Cup, also winning a bronze medal at the 2004 Summer Olympics.

== Club career ==
=== Early career ===
Born in Ferentino, Angelo Palombo began playing football for local side AS Ferentino. He spent the 1997–98 season with Serie D club Urbania Calcio. At age 17, he moved to Serie C team Fano before being signed by Serie A side Fiorentina in 1999 where he spent two years playing for the Primavera team of the club. He made his professional debut in a Coppa Italia match against Como and first featured in the Serie A on 10 February 2002 in a 2–0 away defeat against Venezia.

=== Sampdoria and Inter loan ===
Palombo moved to Sampdoria, then in Serie B, on a free transfer in the 2002 summer transfer window when Fiorentina declared bankruptcy and were forced to put their players on sale. After helping the Ligurian club gain promotion that season, he established himself as an integral part of the side. During the 2005–06 season, he scored his first Serie A goal for Sampdoria on 18 January 2006 against his boyhood club Fiorentina and made his European debut in the UEFA Cup in September. Palombo had many very good seasons at the club, leading to him being a regular in the Italy national team. When Sampdoria were again relegated at the end of the 2010–11 season, his future at the club was put into doubt, with many Serie A sides interested but mainly his former club Fiorentina. Palombo, by then the club's captain, said, however, that he had no intention to move unless the club wished to sell him and remained at the club, commenting: "I'll end my career with Sampdoria. I'm proud to have received some important offers and I thank the clubs who have come forward. However, I haven't thought about leaving here, not even for a moment. I think I have already demonstrated how tied I am to this shirt."

He spent the first half of the 2011–12 season in Serie B with Sampdoria, but on 31 January 2012, he was signed by Inter on loan with an option to buy, as a replacement for Thiago Motta. He made his club debut the following day, coming on as a substitute for Andrea Poli in a 4–4 home draw against Palermo. However, he only made three appearances for Inter in total, and returned to Sampdoria at the end of the 2011–12 Serie A season, who had secured a spot back in Serie A for the 2012–13 season. However, it seemed that he was set to leave the club in the summer of 2012, and was even linked with several other Italian sides; after no other offers, he remained with Sampdoria the following season, started to play regularly and managing to get his contract renewed twice until his retirement.

He announced his retirement from professional football in July 2017, after collecting 459 appearances for Sampdoria in his 15 years spent at the club.

== International career ==
Palombo was in the Italy U-21 team that won the 2004 UEFA European Under-21 Championship and achieved bronze medal of the 2004 Summer Olympics football tournament.

Palombo made his Italy national team debut in the 0–2 defeat to Croatia on 16 August 2006, coming as a substitute for Fabio Liverani in the 58th minute. He was a member of Italy's 23-man squad that took part at the 2009 FIFA Confederations Cup. After a good 2009–10 season at club level, Marcello Lippi named him in the final 23-man squad for the 2010 FIFA World Cup. In total, he won 22 caps for Italy at senior level between 2006 and 2011.

== Post-playing career ==
After retiring from professional football, Palombo joined the coaching team of Marco Giampaolo for the 2017–18 season with his former club Sampdoria. He received his coaching licence on 15 December 2017.

== Style of play ==
Palombo was usually deployed as a defensive or box-to-box midfielder in the centre of the pitch, where he could effectively combine his defensive and athletic attributes, as well as his ability to break down opposition plays, with his ability to start attacking plays and create chances for teammates as a deep-lying playmaker; however, his energetic, hard-working style of play and his stamina allowed him to play anywhere in midfield, and he was also deployed as a winger on occasion. In addition to his ball-winning and passing abilities, he also possessed a powerful shot from distance. Palombo was a physically strong, tenacious, influential, and determined player, with good feet, who was also known for his passion and good quality of play on the pitch; however, he was also accused by certain pundits of inconsistency at times throughout his career. In his youth, Palombo cited Demetrio Albertini as one of his major influences.

== Career statistics ==
=== Club ===
Appearances and goals by club, season and competition
Club	Season	League			Cup		Europe		Total	
Club	Season	Division	Apps	Goals	Apps	Goals	Apps	Goals	Apps	Goals
Fiorentina	2001–02	Serie A	10	0	1	0	—		11	0
Sampdoria	2002–03	Serie A	32	1	5	0	—		37	1
Sampdoria	2003–04	Serie A	31	0	1	0	—		32	0
Sampdoria	2004–05	Serie A	37	0	1	0	—		38	0
Sampdoria	2005–06	Serie A	31	1	2	0	3	0	36	1
Sampdoria	2006–07	Serie A	36	2	7	0	—		43	2
Sampdoria	2007–08	Serie A	33	1	2	1	5	0	40	2
Sampdoria	2008–09	Serie A	25	2	4	0	2	0	31	2
Sampdoria	2009–10	Serie A	36	2	2	1	—		38	3
Sampdoria	2010–11	Serie A	34	1	2	0	6	0	42	1
Sampdoria	2011–12	Serie B	22	1	2	0	—		24	1
Sampdoria	2012–13	Serie A	15	0	0	0	—		15	0
Sampdoria	2013–14	Serie A	32	1	1	0	—		33	1
Sampdoria	2014–15	Serie A	36	1	1	0	—		37	1
Sampdoria	2015–16	Serie A	7	0	—		1	0	8	0
Sampdoria	2016–17	Serie A	4	0	1	0	—		5	0
Sampdoria	Total		411	13	31	2	17	0	459	15
Inter Milan (loan)	2011–12	Serie A	3	0	—		—		3	0
Career total			424	13	32	2	17	0	473	15

=== International ===
Appearances and goals by national team and year
National team	Year	Apps	Goals
Italy	2006	2	0
Italy	2007	2	0
Italy	2008	2	0
Italy	2009	9	0
Italy	2010	6	0
Italy	2011	1	0
Total		22	0

== Honours ==
Italy U21

- UEFA European Under-21 Championship: 2004
- Olympic Bronze Medal: 2004

Orders

- 5th Class / Knight: Cavaliere Ordine al Merito della Repubblica Italiana: 2004
