= Daniele Gastaldello =

Italian footballer (born 1983)

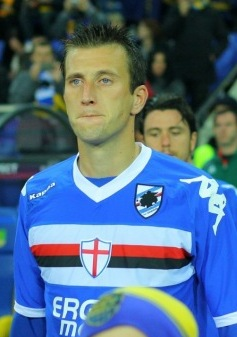
- Gastaldello with Sampdoria in October 2010

Personal information
- Full name: Daniele Gastaldello
- Date of birth: 25 June 1983 (age 43)
- Place of birth: Camposampiero, Italy
- Height: 1.87 m (6 ft 2 in)
- Position: Centre back

Senior career*
Years	Team	Apps	(Gls)
2000–2002	Padova	21	(0)
2002–2003	Juventus	0	(0)
2003–2005	Chievo	0	(0)
2004–2005	→ Crotone (loan)	46	(2)
2005–2007	Siena	45	(1)
2007–2015	Sampdoria	211	(11)
2015–2017	Bologna	61	(1)
2017–2020	Brescia	63	(3)

International career
2001	Italy U17	1	(0)
2001	Italy U19	9	(1)
2002–2004	Italy U20	22	(1)
2011	Italy	1	(0)

Managerial career
- 2020: Brescia (caretaker)
- 2021: Brescia (caretaker)
- 2023: Brescia
- 2024: Legnago Salus
- * Club domestic league appearances and goals

Daniele Gastaldello (Italian pronunciation: [daˈnjɛːle ɡastalˈdɛllo]; born 25 June 1983) is an Italian former professional footballer who played as a defender.

== Club career ==
Gastaldello was bought by Juventus in 2002 from Serie C2 side Calcio Padova; in that season, he played in the Primavera squad. In the 2003 season, he was involved in a transfer with Nicola Legrottaglie. He was sold to Chievo along with Matteo Paro and Giuseppe Sculli. He was loaned to Crotone in January 2004. In 2005, he was bought back, but Juventus sold him in a co-ownership deal to Siena for €450,000. Matteo Paro also joined Siena. In 2007, Juventus bought Siena's half for €650,000 and sold Gastaldello to Sampdoria for €1.25 million.

On 5 March 2010, Gastaldello extended his contract with Sampdoria until 2014. Partnered with Stefano Lucchini, they finished 4th during the 2009–10 season. In the 2010–11 season, he often partnered with Massimo Volta in the 2010–11 UEFA Europa League and Lucchini in the domestic.

In March 2011, he signed a new five-year contract effective from 1 July 2011.

After the 2019–20 season he retired from playing and was appointed technical assistant coach by Brescia.

== International career ==
Gastaldello received his first call-up for Italy on 28 August 2010 under manager Cesare Prandelli. On 29 March 2011, he made his senior international debut in a 2–0 friendly win over Ukraine in Kyiv.

== Coaching career ==
After retiring as an active footballer, Gastaldello accepted to stay at Brescia as a coaching staff member. On 7 December 2020, following the dismissal of Diego López as a head coach, he was named the club's interim head coach, overseeing a 2–2 draw against Cremonese before moving back to his previous role following the appointment of Davide Dionigi as new boss.

On 21 December 2022, Gastaldello was sacked by Brescia with immediate effect following the dismissal of Pep Clotet as head coach. He was however re-hired by Brescia on 20 February 2023, this time as the club's new head coach. Despite Brescia suffering relegation to Serie C following a defeat at the hands of Cosenza, Gastaldello was confirmed in charge of the Rondinelle for the new season; Brescia were successively readmitted to Serie B to fill a vacancy created by the exclusion of Reggina.

On 10 November 2023, following a string of negative results that left Brescia in 13th place in the Serie B league table, Gastaldello was however dismissed once again from his coaching post.

On 18 June 2024, he was announced as the new head coach of Serie C club Legnago Salus. He was sacked on 26 September 2024 after suffering six defeats in the first six league games of the season.

== Managerial statistics ==
As of 20 June 2024

Managerial record by team and tenure
Team	Nat	From	To	Record							
Team	Nat	From	To	G	W	D	L	GF	GA	GD	Win %
Brescia (caretaker)	(Italy)	7 December 2020	10 December 2020	1	0	1	0	2	2	+0	0.00
Brescia (caretaker)	(Italy)	3 February 2021	7 February 2021	1	0	1	0	3	3	+0	0.00
Brescia	(Italy)	20 February 2023	10 November 2023	0	0	0	0	0	0	+0	—
Legnago Salus	(Italy)	1 July 2024	present	0	0	0	0	0	0	+0	—
Total				2	0	2	0	5	5	+0	0.00

== Honours ==
Crotone

- Serie C1/B Promotion Playoffs Winner: 2004
