= 2005–06 UC Sampdoria season =

Sampdoria
2005–06 season
- Chairman: Riccardo Garrone
- Manager: Walter Novellino
- Serie A: 12th
- Coppa Italia: Quarter-finals
- UEFA Cup: Group stage
- Top goalscorer: League: Francesco Flachi (11); All: Francesco Flachi (15)

During the 2005–06 season, Sampdoria dropped to 12th position in the Coppa Italia and failed to progress from the UEFA Cup's Group's stage.

== Kit ==
Sampdoria's kit was manufactured by Kappa and sponsored by Erg.

== Players ==
=== First-team squad ===
Squad at end of season

Note: Flags indicate national team as defined under FIFA eligibility rules; some limited exceptions apply. Players may hold more than one non-FIFA nationality.

No.	Pos.	Nation	Player
1	GK	ITA	Luca Castellazzi
2	DF	ITA	Luca Calzolaio
3	DF	ITA	Marco Zamboni (on loan from Reggina)
4	MF	ITA	Sergio Volpi
6	MF	SUI	Bruno Mota (on loan from Chiasso)
7	FW	ITA	Andrea Gasbarroni (on loan from Palermo)
8	MF	ITA	Samuele Dalla Bona (on loan from Milan)
9	FW	ITA	Fabio Bazzani
10	FW	ITA	Francesco Flachi
11	MF	ITA	Mattia Marchesetti (on loan from Cremonese)
12	GK	ITA	Gianluca Di Gennaro
13	FW	BLR	Vitali Kutuzov
14	DF	ITA	Marcello Castellini
15	DF	ITA	Luigi Sala
16	MF	ITA	Danilo Soddimo
17	MF	ITA	Angelo Palombo

No.	Pos.	Nation	Player
18	FW	ITA	Emiliano Bonazzoli (on loan from Reggina)
19	DF	ITA	Giulio Falcone
21	GK	ITA	Francesco Antonioli
22	MF	ITA	Max Tonetto
23	MF	ITA	Paolo Castellazzi
26	DF	ITA	Marco Pisano
27	FW	ITA	Corrado Colombo
28	DF	ITA	Mark Iuliano
29	MF	ITA	Gionata Mingozzi
32	DF	ITA	Simone Pavan
34	MF	ITA	Aimo Diana
50	FW	ITA	Pietro Arnulfo
77	DF	ITA	Cristian Zenoni
86	GK	ITA	Michele Mangiapelo
88	FW	ITA	Salvatore Foti

=== Left club during season ===
Note: Flags indicate national team as defined under FIFA eligibility rules; some limited exceptions apply. Players may hold more than one non-FIFA nationality.

No.	Pos.	Nation	Player
6	MF	GHA	Mark Edusei (on loan to Torino)
7	MF	CMR	Thomas Job (on loan to Cremonese)
11	FW	ITA	Marco Borriello (on loan from Milan)

No.	Pos.	Nation	Player
20	MF	ITA	Lamberto Zauli (to Bologna)
40	MF	ITA	Gennaro Delvecchio (on loan to Lecce)
45	MF	ITA	Ignazio Abate (on loan from Milan)

== Transfers ==
=== In ===
- Luca Castellazzi - Brescia, free
- Marco Zamboni - Reggina, loan
- Bruno Mota - Chiasso, loan
- Andrea Gasbarroni - Palermo, loan
- Samuele Dalla Bona - Milan, loan
- Mattia Marchesetti - Cremonese, loan
- Gianluca Di Gennaro - Torino, free
- Luigi Sala - Atalanta
- Emiliano Bonazzoli - Reggina, loan
- Paolo Castellazzi - Torino, free
- Mark Iuliano - Mallorca
- Gionata Mingozzi - Perugia
- Cristian Zenoni - Juventus, free

== Competitions ==
=== Serie A ===
==== League table ====
Pos	Team	Pld	W	D	L	GF	GA	GD	Pts
10	Ascoli	38	9	16	13	43	53	−10	43
11	Udinese	38	11	10	17	40	54	−14	43
12	Sampdoria	38	10	11	17	47	51	−4	41
13	Reggina	38	11	8	19	39	65	−26	41
14	Cagliari	38	8	15	15	42	55	−13	39

Source: 2005–06 Serie A, Soccerway
Rules for classification: 1) points; 2) goal difference; 3) number of goals scored.

==== Results summary ====
Overall								Home						Away					
Pld	W	D	L	GF	GA	GD	Pts	W	D	L	GF	GA	GD	W	D	L	GF	GA	GD
38	10	11	17	47	51	−4	41	6	6	7	29	29	0	4	5	10	18	22	−4

Last updated: 14 May 2006.
Source: Competitive matches

==== Results by round ====
Round	1	2	3	4	5	6	7	8	9	10	11	12	13	14	15	16	17	18	19	20	21	22	23	24	25	26	27	28	29	30	31	32	33	34	35	36	37	38
Ground	A	H	H	A	H	A	A	H	A	H	A	H	A	H	A	H	A	H	A	H	A	A	H	A	H	H	A	H	A	H	A	H	A	H	A	H	A	H
Result	L	W	W	W	L	W	L	D	L	D	W	W	L	W	D	D	L	L	W	W	L	D	D	D	W	L	L	L	L	L	L	D	L	L	D	D	D	L
Position	15	10	8	5	8	4	6	8	9	10	8	6	7	7	6	7	7	9	8	7	7	9	9	8	8	9	9	9	9	10	11	10	11	12	11	13	12	12

Updated to match(es) played on 14 May 2006. Source: Competitive matches
A = Away; H = Home; W = Win; D = Draw; L = Loss

==== Matches ====
27 August 2005 1	Fiorentina	2–1	Sampdoria	Florence
20:30 CEST	Fiore 12'; Toni 30' (pen.)		Diana 74'	Stadium: Stadio Artemio Franchi; Attendance: 35,854; Referee: Gianluca Paparesta

11 September 2005 2	Sampdoria	3–2	Reggina	Genoa
15:00 CEST	Bonazzoli 17'; Volpi 57'; Gasbarroni 85'		Cozza 28'; Missiroli 90+3'	Stadium: Stadio Luigi Ferraris; Attendance: 21,160; Referee: Luca Palanca

18 September 2005 3	Sampdoria	2–1	Milan	Genoa
15:00 CEST	Bonazzoli 38'; Tonetto 57'		Gilardino 18'	Stadium: Stadio Luigi Ferraris; Attendance: 27,809; Referee: Paolo Bertini

21 September 2005 4	Treviso	0–2	Sampdoria	Padova
20:30 CEST			Bonazzoli 45', 48'	Stadium: Stadio Euganeo; Attendance: 4,428; Referee: Luca Banti

25 September 2005 5	Sampdoria	1–2	Chievo	Genoa
15:00 CEST	Flachi 50'		Franceschini 36'; Obinna 60'	Stadium: Stadio Luigi Ferraris; Attendance: 21,195; Referee: Stefano Cassarà

2 October 2005 6	Messina	1–4	Sampdoria	Messina
15:00 CEST	D'Agostino 77'		Flachi 45+1'; Bonazzoli 63', 90'; Borriello 75'	Stadium: Stadio San Filippo; Attendance: 22,000; Referee: Massimo De Santis

16 October 2005 7	Ascoli	2–1	Sampdoria	Ascoli Piceno
15:00 CEST	Tosto 45', 78'		Bonazzoli 53'	Stadium: Stadio Cino e Lillo Del Duca; Attendance: 11,992; Referee: Massimiliano Saccani

23 October 2005 8	Sampdoria	3–3	Siena	Genoa
15:00 CEST	Flachi 38' (pen.); Volpi 54', 90+5' (pen.)		Locatelli 48'; Chiesa 75' (pen.); Vergassola 88'	Stadium: Stadio Luigi Ferraris; Attendance: 20,925; Referee: Oscar Girardi

26 October 2005 9	Juventus	2–0	Sampdoria	Turin
20:30 CEST	Trezeguet 41'; Mutu 57'			Stadium: Stadio Delle Alpi; Attendance: 29,977; Referee: Antonio Dattilo

29 October 2005 10	Sampdoria	2–2	Internazionale	Genoa
18:00 CET	Diana 6', 35'		Cambiasso 30'; Córdoba 40'	Stadium: Stadio Luigi Ferraris; Attendance: 27,726; Referee: Stefano Farina

6 November 2005 11	Palermo	0–2	Sampdoria	Palermo
20:30 CET			Gasbarroni 32'; Bonazzoli 72'	Stadium: Stadio Renzo Barbera; Attendance: 29,087; Referee: Matteo Trefoloni

20 November 2005 12	Sampdoria	2–0	Lazio	Genoa
15:00 CET	Diana 71'; Flachi 73'			Stadium: Stadio Luigi Ferraris; Attendance: 22,575; Referee: Salvatore Racalbuto

27 November 2005 13	Cagliari	2–0	Sampdoria	Cagliari
15:00 CET	Suazo 20', 52'			Stadium: Stadio Sant'Elia; Attendance: 10,200; Referee: Paolo Dondarini

4 December 2005 14	Sampdoria	2–0	Empoli	Genoa
15:05 CET	Borriello 77'; Flachi 87'			Stadium: Stadio Luigi Ferraris; Attendance: 20,143; Referee: Gabriele Gava

11 December 2005 15	Parma	1–1	Sampdoria	Parma
15:00 CET	Corradi 25'		Bonazzoli 84'	Stadium: Stadio Ennio Tardini; Attendance: 13,617; Referee: Stefano Farina

18 December 2005 16	Sampdoria	1–1	Roma	Genoa
20:30 CET	Flachi 56' (pen.)		Totti 15'	Stadium: Stadio Luigi Ferraris; Attendance: 22,551; Referee: Gianluca Rocchi

21 December 2005 17	Udinese	2–0	Sampdoria	Udine
20:30 CET	Zapata 26'; Castellini 80' (o.g.)			Stadium: Stadio Friuli; Attendance: 15,379; Referee: Massimiliano Saccani

8 January 2006 18	Sampdoria	0–2	Livorno	Genoa
15:00 CET			C. Lucarelli 8', 90+2'	Stadium: Stadio Luigi Ferraris; Attendance: 23,201; Referee: Massimo De Santis

14 January 2006 19	Lecce	0–3	Sampdoria	Lecce
18:00 CET			Diana 21', 44'; Bazzani 48'	Stadium: Stadio Via del Mare; Attendance: 11,399; Referee: Emidio Morganti

18 January 2006 20	Sampdoria	3–1	Fiorentina	Genoa
20:30 CET	Palombo 12'; Tonetto 25'; Flachi 32'		Toni 14'	Stadium: Stadio Luigi Ferraris; Attendance: 22,586; Referee: Domenico Messina

22 January 2006 21	Reggina	2–1	Sampdoria	Reggio Calabria
15:00 CET	Paredes 75'; Amoruso 46'		Kutuzov 44'	Stadium: Stadio Oreste Granillo; Attendance: 9,385; Referee: Roberto Rosetti

28 January 2006 22	Milan	1–1	Sampdoria	Milan
20:30 CET	Shevchenko 13' (pen.)		Gasbarroni 36'	Stadium: San Siro; Attendance: 55,395; Referee: Massimo De Santis

5 February 2006 23	Sampdoria	1–1	Treviso	Genoa
15:00 CET	Kutuzov 29'		Lazzaretti 64'	Stadium: Stadio Luigi Ferraris; Attendance: 20,231; Referee: Paolo Bertini

8 February 2006 24	Chievo	1–1	Sampdoria	Verona
20:30 CET	Scurto 61'		Kutuzov 30'	Stadium: Stadio Marcantonio Bentegodi; Attendance: 5,005; Referee: Emidio Morganti

12 February 2006 25	Sampdoria	4–2	Messina	Genoa
15:00 CET	Castellini 19'; Volpi 69' (pen.); Tonetto 80'; Foti 90+5'		Muslimović 18'; Di Napoli 89' (pen.)	Stadium: Stadio Luigi Ferraris; Attendance: 20,344; Referee: Paolo Tagliavento

19 February 2006 26	Sampdoria	1–2	Ascoli	Genoa
15:00 CET	Volpi 71'		Quagliarella 56'; Budan 86'	Stadium: Stadio Luigi Ferraris; Attendance: 20,135; Referee: Gianluca Rocchi

26 February 2006 27	Siena	1–0	Sampdoria	Siena
15:00 CET	Vergassola 80'			Stadium: Stadio Artemio Franchi; Attendance: 7,409; Referee: Salvatore Racalbuto

4 March 2006 28	Sampdoria	0–1	Juventus	Genoa
20:30 CET			Nedvěd 69'	Stadium: Stadio Luigi Ferraris; Attendance: 35,369; Referee: Matteo Trefoloni

11 March 2006 29	Internazionale	1–0	Sampdoria	Milan
20:30 CET	Adriano 40'			Stadium: San Siro; Attendance: 48,826; Referee: Nicola Rizzoli

19 March 2006 30	Sampdoria	0–2	Palermo	Genoa
15:00 CET			Di Michele 57'; Mutarelli 66'	Stadium: Stadio Luigi Ferraris; Attendance: 21,073; Referee: Nicola Ayroldi

26 March 2006 31	Lazio	2–0	Sampdoria	Rome
15:00 CEST	Oddo 70', 90' (pen.)			Stadium: Stadio Olimpico; Attendance: 24,000; Referee: Roberto Rosetti

2 April 2006 32	Sampdoria	1–1	Cagliari	Genoa
15:00 CEST	Castellini 14'		Suazo 68'	Stadium: Stadio Luigi Ferraris; Attendance: 20,779; Referee: Massimiliano Saccani

9 April 2006 33	Empoli	2–1	Sampdoria	Empoli
15:00 CEST	Buscè 28', 47'		Flachi 60' (pen.)	Stadium: Stadio Carlo Castellani; Attendance: 5,948; Referee: Gianluca Paparesta

15 April 2006 34	Sampdoria	1–2	Parma	Genoa
15:00 CEST	Flachi 39'		Corradi 51' (pen.); Bresciano 90'	Stadium: Stadio Luigi Ferraris; Attendance: 21,514; Referee: Oscar Girardi

22 April 2006 35	Roma	0–0	Sampdoria	Rome
15:00 CEST				Stadium: Stadio Olimpico; Attendance: 39,846; Referee: Emidio Morganti

30 April 2006 36	Sampdoria	1–1	Udinese	Genoa
15:00 CEST	Flachi 62'		Di Natale 57'	Stadium: Stadio Luigi Ferraris; Attendance: 20,644; Referee: Luca Palanca

7 May 2006 37	Livorno	0–0	Sampdoria	Livorno
15:00 CEST				Stadium: Stadio Armando Picchi; Attendance: 11,291; Referee: Nicola Stefanini

14 May 2006 38	Sampdoria	1–3	Lecce	Genoa
15:00 CEST	Flachi 90+3'		Delvecchio 25'; Konan 52', 85'	Stadium: Stadio Luigi Ferraris; Attendance: 21,116; Referee: Francesco Squillace

=== Coppa Italia ===
==== Round of 16 ====
8 December 2005 First leg	Cagliari	1–1	Sampdoria	Cagliari
18:00 CET	Cocco 89'		Pavan 68'	Stadium: Stadio Sant'Elia; Attendance: 5,000; Referee: Nicola Stefanini

11 January 2006 Second leg	Sampdoria	2–1 (3–2 agg.)	Cagliari	Genoa
21:00 CET	Flachi 78', 90+4'		Gobbi 90+3'	Stadium: Stadio Luigi Ferraris; Attendance: 15,000; Referee: Luca Banti

==== Quarter-finals ====
25 January 2006 First leg	Udinese	1–1	Sampdoria	Udine
18:00 CET	Di Natale 23'		Diana 76'	Stadium: Stadio Friuli; Attendance: 5,000; Referee: Gianluca Rocchi

1 February 2006 Second leg	Sampdoria	2–2 (3–3a agg.)	Udinese	Genoa
17:30 CET	Foti 63'; Pisano 71'		Di Natale 43'; Pieri 59'	Stadium: Stadio Luigi Ferraris; Attendance: 7,385; Referee: Pasquale Rodomonti
