= Borriello =

Borriello is an Italian surname. Notable people with the surname include:

- Fabio Borriello (born 1985), Italian footballer
- Gaetano Borriello (1958–2015), American computer scientist
- Marco Borriello (born 1982), Italian footballer
- Michelangelo Borriello (1909–1995), Italian sport shooter
