= 2004–05 Reggina Calcio season =

Reggina
2004–05 season
- Chairman: Pasquale Foti
- Manager: Walter Mazzarri
- Serie A: 10th
- Coppa Italia: 2nd Round
- Top goalscorer: Emiliano Bonazzoli (9)

Reggina Calcio took major steps in establishing itself in Serie A under new coach Walter Mazzarri. The relegation battle was the tightest ever, but Reggina's points average was its highest in the top division yet, resulting in a surprising 10th place. This success also meant the team lost several key players, with Shunsuke Nakamura, Martin Jiránek and Emiliano Bonazzoli being hard to replace.

== Squad ==
As of match played 29 May 2005

No.	Name	Nationality	Position	Date of birth (age)	Signed from	Signed in	Contract ends	Apps.	Goals
Goalkeepers
	Nicola Pavarini	(Italy)	GK	24 February 1974 (aged 31)	Livorno	2004			
	Salvatore Soviero	(Italy)	GK	18 July 1973 (aged 31)	Venezia	2004			
	Giacomo Mazzi	(Italy)	GK	18 January 1979 (aged 26)	Lodigiani	2004			
Defenders
	Iacopo Balestri	(Italy)	DF	21 June 1975 (aged 29)	Modena	2004			
	Juriy Cannarsa	(Italy)	DF	22 April 1976 (aged 29)	Livorno	2004			
	Gaetano De Rosa	(Italy)	DF	10 May 1973 (aged 32)	Bari	2004			
	Ivan Franceschini	(Italy)	DF	7 December 1976 (aged 28)	Genoa	2001			
	Felice Piccolo	(Italy)	DF	27 August 1983 (aged 21)	Como	2004			
	Marco Zamboni	(Italy)	DF	7 December 1977 (aged 27)	Napoli	2004			
Midfielders
	Ricardo Verón	(Argentina)	MF	22 January 1981 (aged 24)	San Lorenzo	2001			
	Mozart	(Brazil)	MF	8 November 1979 (aged 25)	Flamengo	2000			
	Giuseppe Colucci	(Italy)	MF	24 August 1980 (aged 24)	on loan from Hellas Verona	2004	2005		
	Giandomenico Mesto	(Italy)	MF	25 May 1982 (aged 23)	Youth Team	1998			
	Simone Missiroli	(Italy)	MF	23 May 1986 (aged 19)	Youth Team	2004			
	Giacomo Tedesco	(Italy)	MF	1 February 1976 (aged 29)	Cosenza	2003			
	Shunsuke Nakamura	(Japan)	MF	24 June 1978 (aged 26)	Yokohama F. Marinos	2002			
	Carlos Paredes	(Paraguay)	MF	16 July 1976 (aged 28)	Porto	2002			
	Ricardo Esteves	(Portugal)	MF	16 September 1979 (aged 25)	Paços Ferreira	2004			
	Viktor Budyanskiy	(Russia)	MF	12 January 1984 (aged 21)	Co-ownership with Juventus	2005			
Forwards
	Emiliano Bonazzoli	(Italy)	FW	20 January 1979 (aged 26)	Parma	2003			
	Marco Borriello	(Italy)	FW	18 June 1982 (aged 22)	on loan from AC Milan	2004	2005		
	Massimo Ganci	(Italy)	FW	17 November 1981 (aged 23)	on loan from Treviso	2004	2005		
	Ilyos Zeytulayev	(Uzbekistan)	FW	13 August 1984 (aged 20)	Co-ownership with Juventus	2005			

== Competitions ==
=== Overview ===
Competition	First match	Last match	Starting round	Final position	Record							
Competition	First match	Last match	Starting round	Final position	Pld	W	D	L	GF	GA	GD	Win %
Serie A	12 September 2004	29 May 2005	Matchday 1	10th	38	10	14	14	36	45	−9	26.32
Coppa Italia	16 September 2004	29 September 2004	Second stage	Second stage	2	0	0	2	3	7	−4	0.00
Total					40	10	14	16	39	52	−13	25.00

Last updated: 29 May 2005
Source: Competitions

=== Serie A ===
==== League table ====
Pos	Team	Pld	W	D	L	GF	GA	GD	Pts	Qualification or relegation
8	Roma (Note: Roma gained entry to the 2005–06 UEFA Cup as 2004–05 Coppa Italia runners-up: champions Internazionale qualified to the 2005–06 UEFA Champions League.)	38	11	12	15	55	58	−3	45	Qualification to UEFA Cup first round
9	Livorno	38	11	12	15	49	60	−11	45	
10	Reggina	38	10	14	14	36	45	−9	44	
11	Lecce	38	10	14	14	66	73	−7	44	
12	Cagliari	38	10	14	14	51	60	−9	44	

Source: 2004–05 Serie A, RSSSF.com, Soccerway
Rules for classification: 1) Points; 2) Head-to-head points; 3) Head-to-head goal difference; 4) Goal difference; 5) Goals scored; 6) Draw. (Note: Head-to-head record is used only after all the matches between the teams in question have been played).

==== Results summary ====
Overall								Home						Away					
Pld	W	D	L	GF	GA	GD	Pts	W	D	L	GF	GA	GD	W	D	L	GF	GA	GD
38	10	14	14	36	45	−9	44	7	6	6	21	23	−2	3	8	8	15	22	−7

Last updated: 29 May 2005.
Source: Results

==== Results by matchday ====
Matchday	1	2	3	4	5	6	7	8	9	10	11	12	13	14	15	16	17	18	19	20	21	22	23	24	25	26	27	28	29	30	31	32	33	34	35	36	37	38
Ground	H	A	H	A	A	H	A	H	A	H	A	H	A	H	H	A	H	A	H	A	H	A	H	H	A	H	A	H	A	H	A	H	A	A	H	A	H	A
Result	D	D	W	D	L	L	D	L	L	W	L	W	W	L	W	L	W	D	D	W	W	D	D	L	L	W	L	L	L	L	W	D	L	D	D	D	D	D
Position	14	14	9	9	12	13	15	18	18	17	19	16	14	16	13	14	10	11	9	8	7	8	9	11	11	9	10	11	13	14	13	13	13	14	13	12	13	10

Updated to match(es) played on 29 May 2005. Source: Results
A = Away; H = Home; W = Win; D = Draw; L = Loss; P = Postponed

==== Results ====
12 September 2004 1	Reggina	0–0	Udinese	Reggio
				Stadium: Stadio Oreste Granillo

19 September 2004 2	Lazio	1–1	Reggina	Rome
	Inzaghi 32' (pen.)		Bonazzoli 35'	Stadium: Stadio Olimpico

22 September 2004 3	Reggina	2–1	Livorno	Reggio
	Bonazzoli 9'; Colucci 60'		Lucarelli 31'	Stadium: Stadio Oreste Granillo

26 September 2004 4	Siena	0–0	Reggina	Siena
				Stadium: Montepaschi Arena

3 October 2004 5	AC Milan	3–1	Reggina	Milan
	Shevchenko 11', 89'; Kaká 67'		Franceschini 59'	Stadium: San Siro

17 October 2004 6	Reggina	0–1	Sampdoria	Reggio
			Bazzani 36'	Stadium: Stadio Oreste Granillo

24 October 2004 7	Chievo	0–0	Reggina	Verona
				Stadium: Stadio Marcantonio Bentegodi

27 October 2004 8	Reggina	1–2	Fiorentina	Reggio
	Paredes 59'		Maresca 72'; Miccoli 88'	Stadium: Stadio Oreste Granillo

31 October 2004 9	Messina	2–1	Reggina	Messina
	Zampagna 64'; Di Napoli 74'		Bonazzoli 32'	Stadium: Stadio San Filippo

6 November 2004 10	Reggina	2–1	Juventus	Reggio
	Colucci 13'; Zamboni 26'		Ibrahimović 14'	Stadium: Stadio Oreste Granillo

10 November 2004 11	Parma	1–0	Reggina	Parma
	Morfeo 79'			Stadium: Stadio Ennio Tardini

14 November 2004 12	Reggina	1–0	Roma	Reggio
	Bonazzoli 15'			Stadium: Stadio Oreste Granillo

28 November 2004 13	Atalanta	0–1	Reggina	Bergamo
			Budan 12' (o.g.)	Stadium: Stadio Atleti Azzurri d'Italia

5 December 2004 14	Reggina	1–3	Brescia	Reggio
	Zamboni 74'		Stankevičius 18'; Martínez 40'; Caracciolo 80'	Stadium: Stadio Oreste Granillo

12 December 2004 15	Reggina	3–2	Cagliari	Reggio
	Paredes 8'; De Rosa 53', 76'		Langella 6'; Esposito 72'	Stadium: Stadio Oreste Granillo

19 December 2004 16	Bologna	2–0	Reggina	Bologna
	Bellucci 5' (pen.); Meghni 70'			Stadium: Stadio Renato Dall'Ara

6 January 2005 17	Reggina	1–0	Palermo	Reggio
	Nakamura 7'			Stadium: Stadio Oreste Granillo

9 January 2005 18	Lecce	1–1	Reggina	Lecce
	Babù 43'		Mozart 45+3' (pen.)	Stadium: Stadio Via del mare

15 January 2005 19	Reggina	0–0	Inter Milan	Reggio
				Stadium: Stadio Oreste Granillo

23 January 2005 20	Udinese	0–2	Reggina	Udine
			Bonazzoli 40'; Borriello 90+1'	Stadium: Stadio Via del mare

30 January 2005 21	Reggina	2–1	Lazio	Reggio
	Bonazzoli 72'; De Rosa 90+3'		César 10'	Stadium: Stadio Oreste Granillo

2 February 2005 22	Livorno	1–1	Reggina	Livorno
	Vidigal 80'		Paredes 14'	Stadium: Stadio Armando Picchi

6 February 2005 23	Reggina	3–3	Siena	Reggio
	Franceschini 45'; Borriello 81'; Paredes 84'		Vergassola 6'; 0–2 Chiesa 26', 57'	Stadium: Stadio Oreste Granillo

13 February 2005 24	Reggina	0–1	AC Milan	Reggio
			Zamboni 39' (o.g.)	Stadium: Stadio Oreste Granillo

20 February 2005 25	Sampdoria	3–2	Reggina	Genoa
	Flachi 8', 45', 70' (pen.)		Colucci 49'; Tedesco 88'	Stadium: Stadio Luigi Ferraris

27 February 2005 26	Reggina	1–0	Chievo	Reggio
	Nakamura 41'			Stadium: Stadio Oreste Granillo

6 March 2005 27	Fiorentina	2–1	Reggina	Florence
	Pazzini 48'; Miccoli 69' (pen.)		Colucci 78'	Stadium: Stadio Artemio Franchi

13 March 2005 28	Reggina	0–2	Messina	Reggio
			Cristante 12'; D'Agostino 40'	Stadium: Stadio Oreste Granillo

19 March 2005 29	Juventus	1–0	Reggina	Turin
	Del Piero 64'			Stadium: Stadio delle Alpi

10 April 2005 30	Reggina	1–3	Parma	Reggio
	Mozart 53' (pen.)		Morfeo 21', 45+4'; Simplício 58'	Stadium: Stadio Oreste Granillo

16 April 2005 31	Roma	1–2	Reggina	Rome
	Chivu 24'		Franceschini 72'; Bonazzoli 82'	Stadium: Stadio Olimpico

20 April 2005 32	Reggina	0–0	Atalanta	Reggio
				Stadium: Stadio Oreste Granillo

24 April 2005 33	Brescia	2–0	Reggina	Brescia
	Di Biagio 47'; Stankevičius 76'			Stadium: Stadio Mario Rigamonti

30 April 2005 34	Cagliari	1–1	Reggina	Cagliari
	Bianchi 90+1'		Colucci 60'	Stadium: Unipol Domus

8 May 2005 35	Reggina	1–1	Bologna	Reggio
	Esteves 15'		Bellucci 32'	Stadium: Stadio Oreste Granillo

15 May 2005 36	Palermo	1–1	Reggina	Palermo
	Barone 90+4'		Mesto 36'	Stadium: Stadio Renzo Barbera

22 May 2005 37	Reggina	2–2	Lecce	Reggio
	Bonazzoli 9'; Paredes 31'		Vučinić 15', 43'	Stadium: Stadio Oreste Granillo

29 May 2005 38	Inter Milan	0–0	Reggina	Milan
				Stadium: San Siro

=== Coppa Italia ===
16 September 2004 Second stage 1st leg	Atalanta	4–1	Reggina	Bergamo
	Budan 23'; Sala 31'; Albertini 64'; Lazzari 90'		Borriello 26'	Stadium: Stadio Friuli

29 September 2004 Second stage 2nd leg	Reggina	2–3 (3–7 agg.)	Atalanta	Reggio
	Dionigi 69', 90'		Saudati 4'; Bernardini 68' (pen.), 70'	Stadium: Stadio Oreste Granillo

== Squad statistics ==
=== Goal scorers ===
Place	Position	Nation	Number	Name	Serie A	Coppa Italia	Total
1	FW	(Italy)		Emiliano Bonazzoli	8	0	8
2	MF	(Italy)		Giuseppe Colucci	5	0	5
2	MF	(Paraguay)		Carlos Paredes	5	0	5
4	DF	(Italy)		Ivan Franceschini	3	0	3
4	DF	(Italy)		Gaetano De Rosa	3	0	3
4	FW	(Italy)		Marco Borriello	2	1	3
7	DF	(Italy)		Marco Zamboni	2	0	2
7	MF	(Japan)		Shunsuke Nakamura	2	0	2
7	MF	(Brazil)		Mozart	2	0	2
7	MF	(Italy)		Davide Dionigi	0	2	2
11	DF	(Italy)		Giacomo Tedesco	1	0	1
11	MF	(Portugal)		Ricardo Esteves	1	0	1
11	MF	(Italy)		Giandomenico Mesto	1	0	1
11				Own goal	1	0	1
Total					36	3	39
