= Gionata =

Gionata is a masculine Italian given name. Notable people with the name include:

- Gionata Mingozzi (1984–2008), Italian footballer
- Gionata Verzura (born 1992), Thai footballer
