= 2017–18 Cagliari Calcio season =

Cagliari
2017–18 season
- President: Tommaso Giulini
- Manager: Massimo Rastelli (until 17 October 2017); Diego López (from 18 October 2017)
- Stadium: Sardegna Arena
- Serie A: 16th
- Coppa Italia: Fourth round
- Top goalscorer: League: Leonardo Pavoletti (11); All: Leonardo Pavoletti (11)
- Highest home attendance: 16,233 vs Atalanta (20 May 2018, Serie A)
- Lowest home attendance: 1,126 vs Palermo (12 August 2017, Coppa Italia)
- Average home league attendance: 14,685
Home colours	Away colours	Third colours

The 2017–18 season was Cagliari Calcio's second season back in Serie A after being relegated at the end of the 2014–15 season. The club competed in Serie A, finishing 16th, and in the Coppa Italia, where they were eliminated in the fourth round.

== Players ==
=== Squad information ===
As of 1 February 2018.

Note: Flags indicate national team as defined under FIFA eligibility rules; some limited exceptions apply. Players may hold more than one non-FIFA nationality.

No.	Pos.	Nation	Player
1	GK	BRA	Rafael
3	DF	ITA	Marco Andreolli
4	MF	ITA	Daniele Dessena (captain)
7	MF	ITA	Andrea Cossu
8	MF	ITA	Luca Cigarini
9	FW	ITA	Niccolò Giannetti
10	MF	BRA	João Pedro
12	DF	BEL	Senna Miangue
15	DF	BRA	Leandro Castán (on loan from Roma)
16	MF	ITA	Paolo Faragò
17	FW	BRA	Diego Farias
18	MF	ITA	Nicolò Barella
19	DF	ITA	Fabio Pisacane

No.	Pos.	Nation	Player
20	MF	ITA	Simone Padoin
21	MF	MDA	Artur Ioniță
22	DF	GRE	Charalambos Lykogiannis
23	DF	ITA	Luca Ceppitelli
24	FW	COL	Damir Ceter
25	FW	ITA	Marco Sau (vice-captain)
26	GK	ITA	Luca Crosta
27	MF	ITA	Alessandro Deiola
28	GK	ITA	Alessio Cragno
30	FW	ITA	Leonardo Pavoletti
32	FW	PRK	Han Kwang-song
38	MF	ITA	Fabrizio Caligara
56	DF	ITA	Filippo Romagna

== Transfers ==
=== In ===
Date	Pos.	Player	Age	Moving from	Fee	Notes	Source
30 June 2017	MF	(Italy) Luca Cigarini	31	(Italy) Sampdoria	Free	Included as part of Nicola Murru's transfer	
30 June 2017	DF	(Belgium) Senna Miangue	20	(Italy) Internazionale	€3.5M		
1 July 2017	FW	(Croatia) Duje Čop	27	(Spain) Sporting Gijón	Loan return		
1 July 2017	GK	(Italy) Alessio Cragno	23	(Italy) Benevento	Loan return		
1 July 2017	FW	(Italy) Niccolò Giannetti	26	(Italy) Spezia	Loan return		
1 July 2017	MF	(Croatia) Marko Pajač	24	(Italy) Benevento	Loan return		
7 July 2017	DF	(Italy) Marco Andreolli	31	Unattached	Free		
28 July 2017	DF	(Italy) Filippo Romagna	20	(Italy) Juventus	€7.6M		
25 August 2017	DF	(Netherlands) Gregory van der Wiel	29	(Turkey) Fenerbahçe	Undisclosed		
30 August 2017	FW	(Italy) Leonardo Pavoletti	28	(Italy) Napoli	€12M		
1 February 2018	MF	(Italy) Fabrizio Caligara	17	(Italy) Juventus	€2M	Option for Buy-back clause	
1 February 2018	MF	(North Korea) Han Kwang-song	19	(Italy) Perugia			

==== Loans in ====
Date	Pos.	Player	Age	Moving from	Fee	Notes	Source
11 January 2018	DF	(Brazil) Leandro Castán	31	(Italy) Roma	Loan		

=== Out ===
Date	Pos.	Player	Age	Moving to	Fee	Notes	Source
31 May 2017	DF	(Portugal) Bruno Alves	35	(Scotland) Rangers	Undisclosed		
30 June 2017	DF	(Italy) Nicola Murru	22	(Italy) Sampdoria	€7M	€7M + Luca Cigarini	
1 July 2017	MF	(Greece) Panagiotis Tachtsidis	26	(Italy) Torino	Loan return		
21 July 2017	MF	(Italy) Davide Di Gennaro	29	(Italy) Lazio	Undisclosed		
19 August 2017	FW	(Italy) Marco Borriello	35	(Italy) SPAL	Undisclosed		
31 August 2017	FW	(Croatia) Duje Čop	27	(Belgium) Standard Liège	€3M		
1 February 2018	DF	(Netherlands) Gregory van der Wiel	29	(Canada) Toronto FC		Targeted allocation money signing.	

==== Loans out ====
Date	Pos.	Player	Age	Moving to	Fee	Notes	Source
19 August 2017	DF	(Poland) Bartosz Salamon	26	(Italy) SPAL	Loan	Loan with an option to buy	

== Pre-season and friendlies ==
17 July 2017 Friendly	Redival Val di Pejo (Italy)	0–8	(Italy) Cagliari	Peio, Italy
		Report	João Pedro 13' 34'; Barella 16'; Borriello 35'; Farias 51'; Giannetti 57'; Han 71'; Deiola 73'	Stadium: Campo Comunale di Celledizzo

19 July 2017 Friendly	Cagliari (Italy)	8–0	(Italy) Real Vicenza	Peio, Italy
17:30 CEST (UTC+2)	Deiola 10'; Giannetti 36' 39' 61'; Han 45+1'; Cigarini 71'; Borriello 89'; João Pedro 13' 90+2'	Report		Stadium: Campo Comunale di Celledizzo

22 July 2017 Friendly	Brescia (Italy)	2–2	(Italy) Cagliari	Palazzolo, Italy
17:30 CEST (UTC+2)	Cortesi 77'; Semprini 86'	Report	Lancini 47' (o.g.); Čop 62'	Stadium: Stadio Comunale

29 July 2017 Friendly	Cagliari (Italy)	0–1	(Italy) Olbia	Aritzo, Sardinia, Italy
17:30 CEST (UTC+2)		Report	Ragatzu 67'	Stadium: Stadio del Vento; Referee: Collu

31 August 2017 Friendly	Cagliari (Italy)	2–0	(Italy) Tortolì	Assemini, Sardinia, Italy
17:30 CEST (UTC+2)	Capuano 8'; Giannetti 60'	Report		Stadium: Centro Sportivo Ercole Cellino

9 November 2017 Friendly	Nuorese (Italy)	0–3	(Italy) Cagliari	Nuoro, Sardinia, Italy
17:30 CEST (UTC+2)	Melchiorri 19'; João Pedro 39'; Faragò 83'	Report		Stadium: Stadio Frogheri

23 May 2018 III Trofeo Sardegna	Cagliari (Italy)	2–1	(Italy) Olbia	Cagliari, Sardinia, Italy
17:30 CEST (UTC+2)	Giannetti 5'; Sau 12'	Report	Vallocchia 49'	Stadium: Sardegna Arena; Attendance: 5112; Referee: Giua

== Competitions ==
=== Serie A ===
==== League table ====
Pos	Team	Pld	W	D	L	GF	GA	GD	Pts	Qualification or relegation
14	Udinese	38	12	4	22	48	63	−15	40 (Note: Chievo finished ahead of Udinese on head-to-head points: Chievo 1–1 Udinese, Udinese 1–2 Chievo.)	
15	Bologna	38	11	6	21	40	52	−12	39	
16	Cagliari	38	11	6	21	33	61	−28	39	
17	SPAL	38	8	14	16	39	59	−20	38	
18	Crotone (R)	38	9	8	21	40	66	−26	35	Relegation to Serie B

Source: Serie A, Soccerway
Rules for classification: 1) Points; 2) Head-to-head points; 3) Head-to-head goal difference; 4) Goal difference; 5) Goals scored; 6) Draw.
(R) Relegated

==== Results summary ====
Overall								Home						Away					
Pld	W	D	L	GF	GA	GD	Pts	W	D	L	GF	GA	GD	W	D	L	GF	GA	GD
38	11	6	21	33	61	−28	39	6	3	10	18	30	−12	5	3	11	15	31	−16

Last updated: 20 May 2018.
Source: Competitive matches

==== Results by round ====
Round	1	2	3	4	5	6	7	8	9	10	11	12	13	14	15	16	17	18	19	20	21	22	23	24	25	26	27	28	29	30	31	32	33	34	35	36	37	38
Ground	A	A	H	A	H	H	A	H	A	H	A	H	A	H	A	H	A	H	A	H	H	A	H	A	A	H	A	H	A	H	A	H	A	H	A	H	A	H
Result	L	L	W	W	L	L	L	L	L	W	L	W	W	L	D	D	L	L	W	L	L	D	W	D	L	L	L	D	W	L	L	W	L	D	L	L	W	W
Position	18	19	15	10	11	13	14	14	16	14	14	14	13	13	13	14	14	16	15	16	16	16	14	14	15	15	15	14	14	14	16	14	15	14	16	18	16	16

Updated to match(es) played on 20 May 2018. Source: Competitive matches
A = Away; H = Home; W = Win; D = Draw; L = Loss

==== Matches ====
19 August 2017 1	Juventus	3–0	Cagliari	Turin
18:00 CEST (UTC+02:00)	Mandžukić 12'; Dybala 45+1'; Higuaín 66'; Lichtsteiner (yellow card) 77'	Report		Stadium: Allianz Stadium; Attendance: 39,226; Referee: Fabio Maresca

27 August 2017 2	Milan	2–1	Cagliari	Milan
20:45 CEST (UTC+02:00)	Cutrone 10'; Kessié (yellow card) 55'; Suso 70'; Montolivo (yellow card) 89'	Report	João Pedro (yellow card) 18', (goal) 56'	Stadium: San Siro; Attendance: 49,525; Referee: Luca Pairetto

10 September 2017 3	Cagliari	1–0	Crotone	Cagliari
15:00 CEST (UTC+02:00)	Sau 33'; Cigarini (yellow card) 43'; Padoin (yellow card) 45+1'	Report	Ceccherini (yellow card) 53'	Stadium: Sardegna Arena; Attendance: 14,076; Referee: Daniele Doveri

17 September 2017 4	SPAL	0–2	Cagliari	Ferrara
15:00 CEST (UTC+02:00)	Mora (yellow card) 90+2'	Report	João Pedro (yellow card) 11', (goal) 68'; Barella 17', (yellow card) 78'; Capuano (yellow card) 60'	Stadium: Stadio Paolo Mazza; Attendance: 10,979; Referee: Eugenio Abbattista

20 September 2017 5	Cagliari	0–1	Sassuolo	Cagliari
20:45 CEST (UTC+02:00)	Barella (yellow card) 17'; Ceppitelli (yellow card) 29'; Giannetti (yellow card) 90+3'	Report	Matri 60' (pen.); Magnanelli (yellow card) 71'; Cannavaro (yellow card) 83'; Lirola (yellow card) 84'	Stadium: Sardegna Arena; Attendance: 13,898; Referee: Claudio Gavillucci

24 September 2017 6	Cagliari	0–2	Chievo	Cagliari
15:00 CEST (UTC+02:00)	Pisacane (yellow card) 64' (yellow-red card) 83'	Report	Inglese 53'; Hetemaj (yellow card) 69'; Castro (yellow card) 78'; Stępiński 90+3'	Stadium: Sardegna Arena; Attendance: 14,287; Referee: Gianluca Aureliano

1 October 2017 7	Napoli	3–0	Cagliari	Naples
12:30 CEST (UTC+02:00)	Hamšík 4'; Mertens 40' (pen.); Koulibaly 47'	Report		Stadium: Stadio San Paolo; Attendance: 42,813; Referee: Rosario Abisso

15 October 2017 8	Cagliari	2–3	Genoa	Cagliari
15:00 CEST (UTC+02:00)	Barella (yellow card) 20'; Pavoletti (yellow card) 33', (goal) 48'; João Pedro 79' (pen.)	Report	Galabinov 8'; Taarabt 35'; Rigoni 75'	Stadium: Sardegna Arena; Attendance: 13,981; Referee: Davide Massa

22 October 2017 9	Lazio	3–0	Cagliari	Rome
20:45 CEST (UTC+02:00)	Immobile 7' (pen.), 41'; Lucas (yellow card) 30'; Bastos 49'	Report	Andreolli (yellow card) 29'; Dessena (yellow card) 51'; Farias (yellow card) 72'; Pavoletti (yellow card) 80'	Stadium: Stadio Olimpico; Attendance: 20,000; Referee: Luca Pairetto

25 October 2017 10	Cagliari	2–1	Benevento	Cagliari
20:45 CEST (UTC+02:00)	Faragò 9', (yellow card) 28'; Cigarini (yellow card) 55'; Padoin (yellow card) 76'; Barella (yellow card) 83'; Pavoletti (yellow card) 88', (goal) 90+5'	Report	Di Chiara (yellow card) 15'; Iemmello 90+4' (pen.)	Stadium: Sardegna Arena; Attendance: 13,630; Referee: Massimiliano Irrati

29 October 2017 11	Torino	2–1	Cagliari	Turin
20:45 CET (UTC+01:00)	Acquah (yellow card) 23'; Falque 40', (yellow card) 78'; Ansaldi (yellow card) 41'; Obi 66'; Sirigu (yellow card) 90+2'	Report	Barella 30'; João Pedro (yellow card) 61'; Capuano (yellow card) 70'; Miangue (yellow card) 90+3'	Stadium: Stadio Olimpico Grande Torino; Attendance: 18,309; Referee: Gianpaolo Calvarese

5 November 2017 12	Cagliari	2–1	Hellas Verona	Cagliari
15:00 CET (UTC+01:00)	Ceppitelli 28'; Rafael (yellow card) 45+1'; Faragò 85'; Cigarini (yellow card) 87'	Report	B. Zuculini 6', (yellow card) 48'; Caracciolo (yellow card) 11'; Fares (yellow card) 74'; Valoti (yellow card) 79'	Stadium: Sardegna Arena; Attendance: 13,213; Referee: Marco Guida

19 November 2017 13	Udinese	0–1	Cagliari	Udine
15:00 CET (UTC+01:00)	Angella (yellow card) 13'; Bizzarri (red card) 90+9'	Report	João Pedro 54'	Stadium: Dacia Arena; Attendance: 15,612; Referee: Gianluca Manganiello

25 November 2017 14	Cagliari	1–3	Internazionale	Cagliari
20:45 CET (UTC+01:00)	Ceppitelli (yellow card) 66'; Pavoletti 71'; Giannetti (yellow card) 89'	Report	Miranda (yellow card) 13'; Icardi 29', 83'; Brozović 55'; Gagliardini (yellow card) 81'	Stadium: Sardegna Arena; Attendance: 15,974; Referee: Luca Pairetto

3 December 2017 15	Bologna	1–1	Cagliari	Bologna
15:00 CET (UTC+01:00)	Destro (yellow card) 29', (goal) 81'; De Maio (yellow card) 44'; Palacio (yellow card) 62'; Maietta (yellow card) 64'; Poli (yellow card) 66'; Mirante (yellow card) 85'	Report	João Pedro 42'; Ceppitelli (yellow card) 47'; Barella (yellow card) 58'	Stadium: Stadio Renato Dall'Ara; Attendance: 21,940; Referee: Federico La Penna

9 December 2017 16	Cagliari	2–2	Sampdoria	Cagliari
18:00 CET (UTC+01:00)	Ioniță (yellow card) 28'; Farias 56', (yellow card) 67'; Pavoletti 60'; Cigarini (yellow card) 84'	Report	Quagliarella 11', 19'	Stadium: Sardegna Arena; Attendance: 13,424; Referee: Fabrizio Pasqua

16 December 2017 17	Roma	1–0	Cagliari	Rome
20:45 CET (UTC+01:00)	Pellegrini (yellow card) 40'; Fazio 90+4'	Report	João Pedro (yellow card) 27'; Cigarini (yellow card) 44'; Deiola (yellow card) 77'	Stadium: Stadio Olimpico; Attendance: 33,113; Referee: Antonio Damato

22 December 2017 18	Cagliari	0–1	Fiorentina	Cagliari
20:45 CET (UTC+01:00)	João Pedro (yellow card) 72' (red card) 90+3'; Barella (yellow card) 90+1'	Report	Vitor Hugo (yellow card) 52'; Babacar 82'; Chiesa (yellow card) 90+4'	Stadium: Sardegna Arena; Attendance: 14,297; Referee: Marco Di Bello

30 December 2017 19	Atalanta	1–2	Cagliari	Bergamo
15:00 CET (UTC+01:00)	Gómez 90+2'	Report	Pavoletti 6'; Cigarini (yellow card) 21'; Padoin 23'; Andreolli (yellow card) 45'; Miangue (yellow card) 57' (yellow-red card) 90+5'; Ceppitelli (yellow card) 90+3'	Stadium: Stadio Atleti Azzurri d'Italia; Attendance: 17,755; Referee: Fabrizio Pasqua

6 January 2018 20	Cagliari	0–1	Juventus	Cagliari
20:45 CET (UTC+01:00)	Pavoletti (yellow card) 75'	Report	Matuidi (yellow card) 42'; Bernardeschi (yellow card) 51', (goal) 74'	Stadium: Sardegna Arena; Attendance: 16,233; Referee: Gianpaolo Calvarese

21 January 2018 21	Cagliari	1–2	Milan	Cagliari
18:00 CET (UTC+01:00)	Barella 8', (yellow card) 65' (yellow-red card) 88'; Deiola (yellow card) 72'; Pavoletti (yellow card) 81'; Cigarini (yellow card) 90+4'	Report	Kalinić (yellow card) 27'; Kessié 36' (pen.), 42'; Suso (yellow card) 45'; Rodríguez (yellow card) 56' (yellow-red card) 80'	Stadium: Sardegna Arena; Attendance: 15,235; Referee: Marco Guida

28 January 2018 22	Crotone	1–1	Cagliari	Crotone
15:00 CET (UTC+01:00)	Trotta 29' (pen.); Ricci (yellow card) 56'; Ceccherini (yellow card) 62'	Report	Cigarini (yellow card) 19', (goal) 45+7'; Pisacane (red card) 45+2'; Farias (yellow card) 56'	Stadium: Stadio Ezio Scida; Attendance: 8,987; Referee: Paolo Tagliavento

4 February 2018 23	Cagliari	2–0	SPAL	Cagliari
15:00 CET (UTC+01:00)	Cigarini (yellow card) 9', (goal) 34'; Barella (yellow card) 17'; João Pedro (yellow card) 25'; Sau 78', (yellow card) 85'; Castán (yellow card) 90+1'	Report	Mattiello (yellow card) 8'; Vicari (yellow card) 58'	Stadium: Sardegna Arena; Attendance: 15,986; Referee: Davide Massa

11 February 2018 24	Sassuolo	0–0	Cagliari	Reggio Emilia
12:30 CET (UTC+01:00)		Report	Andreolli (yellow card) 56'	Stadium: Mapei Stadium – Città del Tricolore; Attendance: 9,149; Referee: Paolo Mazzoleni

17 February 2018 25	Chievo	2–1	Cagliari	Verona
18:00 CET (UTC+01:00)	Pucciarelli (yellow card) 59'; Giaccherini 74'; Inglese 76'; Sorrentino (yellow card) 87'	Report	Pavoletti (yellow card) 51', (goal) 82'; Andreolli (yellow card) 78'; Barella (yellow card) 90+1'	Stadium: Stadio Marc'Antonio Bentegodi; Attendance: 8,000; Referee: Luigi Nasca

26 February 2018 26	Cagliari	0–5	Napoli	Cagliari
20:45 CET (UTC+01:00)	Barella (yellow card) 35'; Castán (yellow card) 71'	Report	Callejón 29'; Koulibaly (yellow card) 31'; Mertens 42'; Hamšík 61'; Insigne 72' (pen.); Mário Rui 90'	Stadium: Sardegna Arena; Attendance: 13,757; Referee: Piero Giacomelli

11 March 2018 28	Cagliari	2–2	Lazio	Cagliari
15:00 CET (UTC+01:00)	Pavoletti 25'; Ioniță (yellow card) 62'; Barella 74' (pen.); Deiola (yellow card) 86'	Report	Immobile (yellow card) 28', (goal) 90+5'; Ceppitelli 35' (o.g.); Lulić (yellow card) 45+3'; Lucas (yellow card) 54'; Radu (yellow card) 87'	Stadium: Sardegna Arena; Attendance: 14,241; Referee: Marco Guida

18 March 2018 29	Benevento	1–2	Cagliari	Benevento
18:00 CET (UTC+01:00)	Brignola 46', (yellow card) 50'; Cataldi (yellow card) 66'	Report	Castán (yellow card) 29'; Faragò (yellow card) 38'; Pavoletti 90+1'; Barella 90+7' (pen.)	Stadium: Stadio Ciro Vigorito; Attendance: 9,443; Referee: Gianluca Manganiello

31 March 2018 30	Cagliari	0–4	Torino	Cagliari
15:00 CEST (UTC+02:00)		Report	Falque 61'; Ljajić 65'; Ansaldi (yellow card) 70', (goal) 79'; Obi 88'	Stadium: Sardegna Arena; Attendance: 15,959; Referee: Federico La Penna

3 April 2018 27	Genoa	2–1	Cagliari	Genoa
18:30 CEST (UTC+02:00)	Lapadula 53'; Pereira (yellow card) 83'; Medeiros 90'; Biraschi (yellow card) 90+6'	Report	Sau (yellow card) 41'; Ceppitelli (yellow card) 56'; Andreolli (yellow card) 57'; Barella 62' (pen.); Castán (yellow card) 90+5'	Stadium: Stadio Luigi Ferraris; Attendance: 18,869; Referee: Fabio Maresca
Note: Postponed due to Fiorentina player Davide Astori's death; originally scheduled for 4 March 2018.

8 April 2018 31	Hellas Verona	1–0	Cagliari	Verona
15:00 CEST (UTC+02:00)	Fossati (yellow card) 25'; Rômulo 36' (pen.); Bianchetti (yellow card) 60'; Fares (yellow card) 83'; Valoti (yellow card) 87'	Report	Pavoletti (yellow card) 35'	Stadium: Stadio Marc'Antonio Bentegodi; Attendance: 13,918; Referee: Paolo Valeri

14 April 2018 32	Cagliari	2–1	Udinese	Cagliari
15:00 CEST (UTC+02:00)	Pavoletti 21'; Cigarini (yellow card) 69'; Ceppitelli 84'; Barella (yellow card) 90+1'	Report	Lasagna 10'; Danilo (yellow card) 73'; Hallfreðsson (yellow card) 90'; Fofana (yellow card) 90+1'	Stadium: Sardegna Arena; Attendance: 13,755; Referee: Piero Giacomelli

17 April 2018 33	Internazionale	4–0	Cagliari	Milan
20:45 CEST (UTC+02:00)	Cancelo 3'; Icardi 49'; Brozović 60', (yellow card) 63'; Perišić 90'	Report	Giannetti (yellow card) 58'	Stadium: San Siro; Attendance: 47,467; Referee: Fabrizio Pasqua

22 April 2018 34	Cagliari	0–0	Bologna	Cagliari
12:30 CEST (UTC+02:00)	Padoin (yellow card) 38'; Cigarini (yellow card) 86'; Lykogiannis (yellow card) 87'	Report	González (yellow card) 23'; Crisetig (yellow card) 25'; Džemaili (yellow card) 36'; De Maio (yellow card) 63'; Nagy (yellow card) 86'	Stadium: Sardegna Arena; Attendance: 15,024; Referee: Daniele Doveri

29 April 2018 35	Sampdoria	4–1	Cagliari	Genoa
15:00 CEST (UTC+02:00)	Praet 7'; Quagliarella 26'; Linetty (yellow card) 39'; Kownacki 45+4'; Ramírez 87'	Report	Cigarini (yellow card) 19' (yellow-red card) 77'; Pisacane (yellow card) 31'; Farias (yellow card) 37'; Castán (yellow card) 45+1'; Pavoletti 49'; Ioniță (yellow card) 56'; Padoin (yellow card) 82'	Stadium: Stadio Luigi Ferraris; Attendance: 20,189; Referee: Rosario Abisso

6 May 2018 36	Cagliari	0–1	Roma	Cagliari
20:45 CEST (UTC+02:00)	Lykogiannis (yellow card) 23'; Barella (yellow card) 38'; Ioniță (yellow card) 73'; Ceppitelli (yellow card) 88'	Report	Ünder 15'; Gerson (yellow card) 88'	Stadium: Sardegna Arena; Attendance: 15,157; Referee: Marco Di Bello

13 May 2018 37	Fiorentina	0–1	Cagliari	Florence
15:00 CEST (UTC+02:00)	Pezzella (yellow card) 41'; Biraghi (yellow card) 66'; Veretout (yellow card) 90+4' (red card) 90+5'	Report	Pavoletti 37', (yellow card) 86'; Barella (yellow card) 68'; Ceppitelli (yellow card) 90+6'; Caligara (yellow card) 90+7'	Stadium: Stadio Artemio Franchi; Attendance: 34,690; Referee: Paolo Valeri
Note: Fabrizio Caligara was cautioned for dissent while a substitute.

20 May 2018 38	Cagliari	1–0	Atalanta	Cagliari
18:00 CEST (UTC+02:00)	Barella (yellow card) 50'; Ceppitelli 87'; Cigarini (yellow card) 90+3'; Pisacane (yellow card) 90+3'	Report	Castagne (yellow card) 46'	Stadium: Sardegna Arena; Attendance: 16,233; Referee: Davide Massa

=== Coppa Italia ===
12 August 2017 Third round	Cagliari	1–1 (a.e.t.) (4–2 p)	Palermo	Turin
21:15 CEST (UTC+02:00)	João Pedro 45+1'; Pisacane (yellow card) 53'; Barella (yellow card) 56'; Farias (yellow card) 89'	Report	Jajalo (yellow card) 8'; Struna (yellow card) 46'; La Gumina 66'	Stadium: Stadio Olimpico Grande Torino; Attendance: 1,126; Referee: Paolo Valeri
	Penalties
	Cigarini (penalty scored); Čop (penalty scored); Sau (penalty scored); Cossu (penalty scored)		(penalty missed) Jajalo; (penalty missed) Aleesami; (penalty scored) Struna; (penalty scored) La Gumina

28 November 2017 Fourth round	Cagliari	1–2	Pordenone	Cagliari
15:00 CET (UTC+01:00)	Dessena 18', (yellow card) 69'	Report	Miguel Ángel 8', (yellow card) 51'; Bassoli 62'	Stadium: Sardegna Arena; Attendance: 5,026; Referee: Fabio Piscopo

== Statistics ==
=== Appearances and goals ===
No.	Pos	Nat	Player	Total		Serie A		Coppa Italia	
No.	Pos	Nat	Player	Apps	Goals	Apps	Goals	Apps	Goals
Goalkeepers
1	GK	(Brazil) BRA	Rafael	10	0	8+2	0	0	0
12	GK	(Italy) ITA	Luca Crosta	2	0	1	0	1	0
28	GK	(Italy) ITA	Alessio Cragno	30	0	29	0	1	0
Defenders
3	DF	(Italy) ITA	Marco Andreolli	24	0	20+3	0	1	0
12	DF	(Belgium) BEL	Senna Miangue	12	0	8+3	0	1	0
15	DF	(Brazil) BRA	Leandro Castán	14	0	13+1	0	0	0
19	DF	(Italy) ITA	Fabio Pisacane	26	0	22+2	0	2	0
22	DF	(Greece) GRE	Charalambos Lykogiannis	11	0	8+3	0	0	0
23	DF	(Italy) ITA	Luca Ceppitelli	27	3	26+1	3	0	0
56	DF	(Italy) ITA	Filippo Romagna	24	0	21+2	0	1	0
Midfielders
4	MF	(Italy) ITA	Daniele Dessena	18	1	7+10	0	1	1
7	MF	(Italy) ITA	Andrea Cossu	13	0	2+9	0	1+1	0
8	MF	(Italy) ITA	Luca Cigarini	27	2	24+2	2	1	0
10	MF	(Brazil) BRA	João Pedro	24	6	19+3	5	2	1
16	MF	(Italy) ITA	Paolo Faragò	36	2	25+10	2	1	0
18	MF	(Italy) ITA	Nicolò Barella	35	6	34	6	1	0
20	MF	(Italy) ITA	Simone Padoin	37	1	37	1	0	0
21	MF	(Moldova) MDA	Artur Ioniță	37	0	31+5	0	1	0
27	MF	(Italy) ITA	Alessandro Deiola	14	0	4+9	0	0+1	0
38	MF	(Italy) ITA	Fabrizio Caligara	1	0	0+1	0	0	0
Forwards
9	FW	(Italy) ITA	Niccolò Giannetti	9	0	3+5	0	0+1	0
17	FW	(Brazil) BRA	Diego Farias	30	1	14+14	1	2	0
24	FW	(Colombia) COL	Damir Ceter	6	0	1+5	0	0	0
25	FW	(Italy) ITA	Marco Sau	30	2	16+13	2	0+1	0
30	FW	(Italy) ITA	Leonardo Pavoletti	33	11	31+2	11	0	0
32	FW	(North Korea) PRK	Han Kwang-song	7	0	3+4	0	0	0
35	FW	(Italy) ITA	Luca Gagliano	1	0	0	0	0+1	0
Players transferred out during the season
2	DF	(Netherlands) NED	Gregory van der Wiel	6	0	3+2	0	1	0
22	FW	(Italy) ITA	Marco Borriello	1	0	0	0	1	0
24	DF	(Italy) ITA	Marco Capuano	11	0	7+2	0	2	0
36	FW	(Italy) ITA	Federico Melchiorri	1	0	0	0	1	0
90	FW	(Croatia) CRO	Duje Čop	3	0	1+1	0	0+1	0

Last updated: 20 May 2018
Source: Competitions

=== Goalscorers ===
Rank	No.	Pos	Nat	Name	Serie A	Coppa Italia	Total
1	30	FW	(Italy)	Leonardo Pavoletti	11	0	11
2	10	MF	(Brazil)	João Pedro	5	1	6
2	18	MF	(Italy)	Nicolò Barella	6	0	6
4	23	DF	(Italy)	Luca Ceppitelli	3	0	3
5	8	MF	(Italy)	Luca Cigarini	2	0	2
5	16	MF	(Italy)	Paolo Faragò	2	0	2
5	25	FW	(Italy)	Marco Sau	2	0	2
8	4	MF	(Italy)	Daniele Dessena	0	1	1
8	17	FW	(Brazil)	Diego Farias	1	0	1
8	20	MF	(Italy)	Simone Padoin	1	0	1
Own goal					0	0	0
Totals					33	2	35

Last updated: 20 May 2018

=== Clean sheets ===
Rank	No.	Pos	Nat	Name	Serie A	Coppa Italia	Total
1	28	GK	(Italy)	Alessio Cragno	7	0	7
2	1	GK	(Brazil)	Rafael	1	0	1
Totals					8	0	8

Last updated: 20 May 2018

=== Disciplinary record ===
No.	Pos	Nat	Name	Serie A			Coppa Italia			Total		
No.	Pos	Nat	Name	Booked	(yellow card) (yellow-red card)	Sent off (straight red)	Booked	(yellow card) (yellow-red card)	Sent off (straight red)	Booked	(yellow card) (yellow-red card)	Sent off (straight red)
1	GK	(Brazil)	Rafael	1	0	0	0	0	0	1	0	0
3	DF	(Italy)	Marco Andreolli	5	0	0	0	0	0	5	0	0
12	DF	(Belgium)	Senna Miangue	1	1	0	0	0	0	1	1	0
15	DF	(Brazil)	Leandro Castán	5	0	0	0	0	0	5	0	0
19	DF	(Italy)	Fabio Pisacane	2	1	1	1	0	0	3	1	1
22	DF	(Greece)	Charalambos Lykogiannis	2	0	0	0	0	0	2	0	0
23	DF	(Italy)	Luca Ceppitelli	7	0	0	0	0	0	7	0	0
24	DF	(Italy)	Marco Capuano	2	0	0	0	0	0	2	0	0
4	MF	(Italy)	Daniele Dessena	1	0	0	1	0	0	2	0	0
8	MF	(Italy)	Luca Cigarini	12	1	0	0	0	0	12	1	0
10	MF	(Brazil)	João Pedro	6	0	1	0	0	0	6	0	1
16	MF	(Italy)	Paolo Faragò	2	0	0	0	0	0	2	0	0
18	MF	(Italy)	Nicolò Barella	13	1	0	1	0	0	14	1	0
20	MF	(Italy)	Simone Padoin	4	0	0	0	0	0	4	0	0
21	MF	(Moldova)	Artur Ioniță	4	0	0	0	0	0	4	0	0
27	MF	(Italy)	Alessandro Deiola	3	0	0	0	0	0	3	0	0
38	MF	(Italy)	Fabrizio Caligara	1	0	0	0	0	0	1	0	0
9	FW	(Italy)	Niccolò Giannetti	3	0	0	0	0	0	3	0	0
17	FW	(Brazil)	Diego Farias	4	0	0	1	0	0	5	0	0
25	FW	(Italy)	Marco Sau	2	0	0	0	0	0	2	0	0
30	FW	(Italy)	Leonardo Pavoletti	8	0	0	0	0	0	8	0	0
Totals				88	4	2	4	0	0	92	4	2

Last updated: 20 May 2018
