= Arnulfo =

Arnulfo is a masculine given name. It is the Spanish and Italian form of the German name Arnulf.

== As a given name ==
- Arnulfo Aparri, Jr., Filipino murder suspect
- Arnulfo Arias (1901–1988), Panamanian president
- Arnulfo Briceño (1938–1989), Colombian songwriter and lawyer
- Arnulfo Fuentebella (1945–2020), Filipino lawyer
- Arnulfo Mendoza (1954–2014), Mexican artist
- Arnulfo Trejo (1922–2002), American librarian
- Arnulfo Valentierra (b. 1978), Colombian footballer

== As a surname ==
- Pietro Arnulfo (b. 1988), Italian footballer
