= 2010–11 AS Roma season =

Roma
2010–11 season
- President: Rosella Sensi (until 31 March 2011); Thomas DiBenedetto (from 31 March 2011)
- Manager: Claudio Ranieri (until 20 February 2011); Vincenzo Montella (caretaker) (from 21 February 2011)
- Stadium: Stadio Olimpico
- Serie A: 6th
- Supercoppa Italiana: Runners-up
- Coppa Italia: Semi-finals
- UEFA Champions League: Round of 16
- Top goalscorer: League: Francesco Totti (15); All: Marco Borriello, Francesco Totti (17)
- Highest home attendance: 58,083 vs Milan (7 May 2011, Serie A)
- Lowest home attendance: 22,365 vs Basel (19 October 2010, Champions League)
- Average home league attendance: 33,952
Home colours	Away colours	Third colours

The 2010–11 season was Associazione Sportiva Roma's 83rd in existence and 78th season in the top flight of Italian football. Claudio Ranieri began his second season as coach, but resigned as manager on 20 February 2011. He was immediately replaced by Vincenzo Montella as a caretaker for the rest of the season.

After a second-place finish in 2009–10, Roma hoped to improve their position to capture their fourth Scudetto, but finished a disappointing sixth.

Roma competed in the Champions League after not qualifying in 2009–10. Roma faced Internazionale in the 2010 Supercoppa Italiana on 21 August, losing 3–1.

== Players ==
=== Squad information ===
Last updated on 22 May 2011
Appearances include league matches only

No.	Name	Nat	Position(s)	Date of birth (Age at end of season)	Signed from	Signed in	Apps.	Goals
Goalkeepers
1	Bogdan Lobonț	(Romania)	GK	18 January 1978 (aged 33)	(Romania) Dinamo București	2009	8	0
27	Júlio Sérgio	(Brazil)	GK	8 November 1978 (aged 32)	(Brazil) América	2006	49	0
32	Doni	(Brazil)	GK	22 October 1979 (aged 31)	(Brazil) Juventude	2005	149	0
Defenders
3	Paolo Castellini	(Italy)	RB / LB	25 March 1979 (aged 32)	(Italy) Parma	2010	8	0
4	Juan	(Brazil)	CB	1 February 1979 (aged 32)	(Germany) Bayer Leverkusen	2007	103	6
5	Philippe Mexès	(France)	CB	30 March 1982 (aged 29)	(France) Auxerre	2004	183	11
15	Simone Loria	(Italy)	CB	28 October 1976 (aged 34)	(Italy) Siena	2008	15	3
17	John Arne Riise	(Norway)	LB	24 September 1980 (aged 30)	(England) Liverpool	2008	99	7
25	Guillermo Burdisso	(Argentina)	CB	26 September 1988 (aged 22)	(Argentina) Rosario Central	2010	2	0
29	Nicolás Burdisso	(Argentina)	CB / RB	12 April 1981 (aged 30)	(Italy) Internazionale	2009	61	4
77	Marco Cassetti	(Italy)	RB	29 May 1977 (aged 34)	(Italy) Lecce	2006	136	4
87	Aleandro Rosi	(Italy)	RB	17 May 1987 (aged 24)	(Italy) Youth Sector	2004	53	3
Midfielders
7	David Pizarro	(Chile)	CM / DM	11 September 1979 (aged 31)	(Italy) Internazionale	2006	141	9
11	Rodrigo Taddei	(Brazil)	LM / RM / AM	6 March 1980 (aged 31)	(Italy) Siena	2005	177	22
16	Daniele De Rossi (Vice-Captain)	(Italy)	DM / CM	24 July 1983 (aged 27)	(Italy) Youth Sector	2001	249	29
20	Simone Perrotta	(Italy)	LM / CM / AM	17 September 1977 (aged 33)	(Italy) Chievo	2004	211	34
23	Leandro Greco	(Italy)	CM	19 July 1986 (aged 24)	(Italy) Youth Sector	2003	16	0
30	Fábio Simplício	(Brazil)	CM / AM	23 September 1979 (aged 31)	(Italy) Palermo	2010	24	4
33	Matteo Brighi	(Italy)	CM	14 February 1981 (aged 30)	(Italy) Juventus	2004	108	9
48	Alessandro Florenzi	(Italy)	RB / CM / RW	11 March 1991 (aged 20)	(Italy) Youth Sector	2011	1	0
Forwards
9	Mirko Vučinić	(Montenegro)	CF / ST	1 October 1983 (aged 27)	(Italy) Lecce	2006	147	46
10	Francesco Totti (Captain)	(Italy)	AM / LW / SS / CF / ST	27 September 1976 (aged 34)	(Italy) Youth Sector	1992	474	207
22	Marco Borriello	(Italy)	CF / ST	18 June 1982 (aged 29)	(Italy) Milan	2010	34	11
45	Stefano Pettinari	(Italy)	CF / ST	27 January 1992 (aged 19)	(Italy) Youth Sector	2009	1	0
47	Gianluca Caprari	(Italy)	CF / ST	30 July 1993 (aged 17)	(Italy) Youth Sector	2011	2	0
94	Jérémy Ménez	(France)	ST / SS	7 May 1987 (aged 24)	(France) Monaco	2008	84	7
Players transferred during the season
2	Cicinho	(Brazil)	RB	24 June 1980 (aged 31)	(Spain) Real Madrid	2007	60	3
8	Adriano	(Brazil)	CF / ST	17 February 1982 (aged 29)	(Brazil) Flamengo	2010	5	0
19	Júlio Baptista	(Brazil)	AM / CF / ST	1 October 1981 (aged 29)	(Spain) Real Madrid	2008	57	12
89	Stefano Okaka	(Italy)	CF / ST	9 August 1989 (aged 21)	(Italy) Youth Sector	2005	34	2

== Transfers ==
=== In ===
Date	Pos.	Name	From	Fee
8 June 2010	FW	(Brazil) Adriano	(Brazil) Flamengo	Undisclosed
25 June 2010	MF	(Ghana) Ahmed Barusso	(Italy) Rimini	€0.1M
1 July 2010	MF	(Brazil) Fábio Simplício	(Italy) Palermo	€1.8M
10 August 2010	DF	(Argentina) Guillermo Burdisso	(Argentina) Rosario Central	Loan
25 June 2010	DF	(Italy) Aleandro Rosi	(Italy) Siena	Loan

=== Out ===
Date	Pos.	Name	To	Fee
June 28, 2010	DF	(Italy) Marco Motta	(Italy) Udinese	Undisclosed

== Pre-season and friendlies ==
Roma's pre-season began on July 15. 27 players took part in the training camp at Riscone di Brunico.

After three friendlies in camp, the squad took part in the Tournoi de Paris, a tournament featuring Ligue 1 clubs Paris Saint-Germain and Bordeaux.

Pre-season preparations ended on a low note; Roma travelled to face Super League Greece giants Olympiacos, losing 5–1.

Off the pitch, part of the pre-season was dominated by the news that several companies formed to oversee the sale of the club.

Date	Opponents	H / A	Result F – A	Scorers
18 July 2010	Riscone Brunico	N	13–0	Totti 16', Vučinić (3) 17', 45', 58', Riise (3) 22', 34', 46', Adriano 39', Greco 75', Okaka (2) 79', 87', Brighi 84', Loria 90'
24 July 2010	Südtirol	N	4–1	Totti 19', Adriano 68', Ménez 85', Okaka 90'
27 July 2010	Al-Sadd	N	2–1	Ménez 21', Okaka 36'
31 July 2010	Bordeaux	N	1–1	Brighi 78'
1 August 2010	Paris Saint-Germain	A	1–1	Greco 46'
5 August 2010	Levante	A	0(4) – 0(5)	
8 August 2010	Pescara	A	1–0	Totti
11 August 2010	Grosseto	A	1–1	Adrian Piţ 48'
13 August 2010	Olympiacos	A	1 – 5	Ménez 12'

== Competitions ==
=== Overall ===
Competition	Started round	Final position	First match	Last match
Serie A	Matchday 1	6th	28 August 2010	22 May 2011
Supercoppa Italiana	Final	Runners-up	21 August 2010	
Coppa Italia	Round of 16	Semi-finals	19 January 2011	11 May 2011
Champions League	Group stage	Round of 16	15 September 2010	8 March 2011

Last updated: 22 May 2011

=== Supercoppa Italiana ===
Roma qualified for the 2010 Supercoppa Italiana after finishing runner-up to Internazionale in both the league and cup.

On August 21, Inter and Roma kicked off the season at the San Siro. After Roma opened the scoring through a John Arne Riise goal midway through the first half, Inter started their comeback before the end of the half thanks to Goran Pandev. Two second half goals from Samuel Eto'o secured Inter's fifth Supercoppa title.

21 August 2010	Internazionale	3–1	Roma	Milan
20:45 CEST (UTC+02:00)	Pandev 41'; Cambiasso (yellow card) 62'; Eto'o 70', 80'; Samuel (yellow card) 90+4'	Report	Riise 21'; Perrotta (yellow card) 26'; Okaka (yellow card) 85'; Mexès (yellow card) 90+2'	Stadium: San Siro; Attendance: 65,860; Referee: Mauro Bergonzi

=== Serie A ===
==== League table ====
Pos	Team	Pld	W	D	L	GF	GA	GD	Pts	Qualification or relegation
4	Udinese	38	20	6	12	65	43	+22	66 (Note: Udinese finished ahead of Lazio on head-to-head away goals scored: Udinese 2–1 Lazio, Lazio 3–2 Udinese.)	Qualification to Champions League play-off round
5	Lazio	38	20	6	12	55	39	+16	66	Qualification to Europa League play-off round (Note: As Internazionale won the 2010–11 Coppa Italia and already qualified for the Champions League, Palermo entered the 2011–12 UEFA Europa League third qualification round as the cup runners-up.)
6	Roma	38	18	9	11	59	52	+7	63	Qualification to Europa League play-off round
7	Juventus	38	15	13	10	57	47	+10	58	
8	Palermo	38	17	5	16	58	63	−5	56	Qualification to Europa League third qualifying round

Source: Lega Serie A
Rules for classification: 1) points; 2) head-to-head points; 3) head-to-head goal difference; 4) head-to-head goals scored; 5) goal difference; 6) number of goals scored.

==== Results summary ====
Overall								Home						Away					
Pld	W	D	L	GF	GA	GD	Pts	W	D	L	GF	GA	GD	W	D	L	GF	GA	GD
38	18	9	11	59	52	+7	63	11	5	3	31	18	+13	7	4	8	28	34	−6

Last updated: 22 May 2011.
Source: Competitive matches

==== Results by round ====
Round	1	2	3	4	5	6	7	8	9	10	11	12	13	14	15	16	17	18	19	20	21	22	23	24	25	26	27	28	29	30	31	32	33	34	35	36	37	38
Ground	H	A	H	A	H	A	H	A	H	A	H	A	H	A	A	H	A	H	A	A	H	A	H	A	H	A	H	A	H	A	H	A	H	H	A	H	A	H
Result	D	L	D	L	W	L	W	D	W	W	W	D	W	L	D	W	W	W	L	W	W	W	D	L	L	L	D	W	W	D	L	W	L	W	W	D	L	W
Position	14	19	17	19	18	19	13	14	9	7	6	6	5	7	8	7	6	5	5	5	4	4	4	5	6	6	6	6	6	6	6	6	6	6	6	6	6	6

Updated to match(es) played on 22 May 2011. Source: Competitive matches
A = Away; H = Home; W = Win; D = Draw; L = Loss

==== Matches ====
28 August 2010 1	Roma	0–0	Cesena	Rome
20:45 CEST (UTC+02:00)	Vučinić (yellow card) 86'; Totti (yellow card) 89'; Okaka (yellow card) 90+3'	Report	Colucci (yellow card) 65'; Nagatomo (yellow card) 74'; Piangerelli (yellow card) 89'	Stadium: Stadio Olimpico; Attendance: 33,000; Referee: Gabriele Gava

11 September 2010 2	Cagliari	5–1	Roma	Cagliari
20:45 CEST (UTC+02:00)	Conti 8'; Matri 23' (pen.), 47'; Acquafresca 38'; Agostini (yellow card) 51'; Lazzari (yellow card) 63', (goal) 88'; Cossu (yellow card) 84'	Report	De Rossi 18'; N. Burdisso (red card) 22'; Perrotta (yellow card) 81'; Rosi (yellow card) 83'	Stadium: Stadio Sant'Elia; Attendance: 15,000; Referee: Domenico Celi

19 September 2010 3	Roma	2–2	Bologna	Rome
15:00 CEST (UTC+02:00)	Borriello 7'; Rubin 59' (o.g.); Perrotta (yellow card) 90+5'	Report	Rubin (yellow card) 33'; Di Vaio 77', 89', (yellow card) 90+1'; Portanova (yellow card) 84'; Mudingayi (yellow card) 90+3'; Pérez (yellow card) 90+5'	Stadium: Stadio Olimpico; Attendance: 30,488; Referee: Sebastiano Peruzzo

22 September 2010 4	Brescia	2–1	Roma	Brescia
20:45 CEST (UTC+02:00)	Hetemaj 13'; Éder (yellow card) 55'; Caracciolo 64' (pen.)	Report	Cassetti (yellow card) 6'; Mexès (yellow card) 14' (yellow-red card) 64'; Rosi (yellow card) 21'; Borriello 83'; Júlio Sérgio (yellow card) 90+2'	Stadium: Stadio Mario Rigamonti; Attendance: 11,715; Referee: Carmine Russo

25 September 2010 5	Roma	1–0	Internazionale	Rome
20:45 CEST (UTC+02:00)	Cassetti (yellow card) 63'; Perrotta (yellow card) 65'; N. Burdisso (yellow card) 69'; Ménez (yellow card) 78'; Vučinić 90+2'	Report	Chivu (yellow card) 37'; Stanković (yellow card) 52'; Córdoba (yellow card) 57'; Pandev (yellow card) 69'	Stadium: Stadio Olimpico; Attendance: 38,998; Referee: Emidio Morganti

3 October 2010 6	Napoli	2–0	Roma	Naples
15:00 CEST (UTC+02:00)	Pazienza (yellow card) 26'; Gargano (yellow card) 53'; Lavezzi (yellow card) 54'; Hamšík 72'; Aronica (yellow card) 81'; Juan 83' (o.g.)	Report	Cassetti (yellow card) 48'; Pizarro (yellow card) 61'	Stadium: Stadio San Paolo; Attendance: 44,782; Referee: Paolo Tagliavento

16 October 2010 7	Roma	2–1	Genoa	Rome
20:45 CEST (UTC+02:00)	Borriello 34'; Brighi 53', (yellow card) 71'	Report	Palacio (yellow card) 43'; Rudolf 78'; Milanetto (yellow card) 81'; Criscito (yellow card) 90+1'	Stadium: Stadio Olimpico; Attendance: 31,230; Referee: Antonio Damato

24 October 2010 8	Parma	0–0	Roma	Parma
12:30 CEST (UTC+02:00)	Gobbi (yellow card) 35'; Džemaili (yellow card) 37'; Paletta (yellow card) 51'; Morrone (yellow card) 72'	Report	Cicinho (yellow card) 40'; Baptista (yellow card) 87'; Brighi (yellow card) 90+3'	Stadium: Stadio Ennio Tardini; Attendance: 13,937; Referee: Luca Banti

30 October 2010 9	Roma	2–0	Lecce	Rome
18:00 CEST (UTC+02:00)	Juan (yellow card) 57'; N. Burdisso 62'; Cicinho (yellow card) 69'; Vučinić 76'; Totti (red card) 76'	Report	Olivera (red card) 78'; Ofere (yellow card) 79'	Stadium: Stadio Olimpico; Attendance: 29,581; Referee: Andrea Gervasoni

7 November 2010 10	Lazio	0–2	Roma	Rome
15:00 CET (UTC+01:00)	Lichtsteiner (yellow card) 51'; Stendardo (yellow card) 64'; Foggia (yellow card) 78'; Brocchi (yellow card) 87'	Report	Cassetti (yellow card) 31'; Borriello 52' (pen.); Júlio Sérgio (yellow card) 70'; Vučinić 87' (pen.), (yellow card) 90'	Stadium: Stadio Olimpico; Attendance: 52,121; Referee: Emidio Morganti

10 November 2010 11	Roma	3–2	Fiorentina	Rome
20:45 CET (UTC+01:00)	Simplício 45'; Borriello 51'; Perrotta 77'; N. Burdisso (yellow card) 88'	Report	Donadel (yellow card) 9'; Santana (yellow card) 31'; Boruc (yellow card) 42'; Gilardino 68'; D'Agostino 90'	Stadium: Stadio Olimpico; Attendance: 28,804; Referee: Mauro Bergonzi

13 November 2010 12	Juventus	1–1	Roma	Turin
20:45 CET (UTC+01:00)	Iaquinta 35'; Pepe (yellow card) 45+3'	Report	Ménez (yellow card) 1'; Totti 45+5' (pen.); Greco (yellow card) 55'; N. Burdisso (yellow card) 84'	Stadium: Stadio Olimpico di Torino; Attendance: 23,869; Referee: Nicola Rizzoli

20 November 2010 13	Roma	2–0	Udinese	Rome
18:00 CET (UTC+01:00)	Ménez 24'; Borriello 56'; Simplício (yellow card) 58'; Cassetti (yellow card) 65'; N. Burdisso (red card) 81'	Report	Inler (yellow card) 39'; Pinzi (yellow card) 61'	Stadium: Stadio Olimpico; Attendance: 28,863; Referee: Daniele Orsato

28 November 2010 14	Palermo	3–1	Roma	Palermo
20:45 CET (UTC+01:00)	Miccoli 20'; Bačinović (yellow card) 36'; Iličić 61'; Nocerino 65'	Report	De Rossi (yellow card) 70'; Totti 90+2'	Stadium: Stadio Renzo Barbera; Attendance: 29,597; Referee: Christian Brighi

4 December 2010 15	Chievo	2–2	Roma	Verona
18:00 CET (UTC+01:00)	Fernandes (yellow card) 58'; Moscardelli 61'; Granoche 83'; Mantovani (yellow card) 90+3'	Report	Simplício 26', 43'; Vučinić (yellow card) 72'; De Rossi (red card) 86'	Stadium: Stadio Marc'Antonio Bentegodi; Attendance: 11,447; Referee: Nicola Rizzoli

12 December 2010 16	Roma	1–0	Bari	Rome
15:00 CET (UTC+01:00)	Greco (yellow card) 5'; Juan 30', (yellow card) 41'; Borriello (yellow card) 88'; Cassetti (yellow card) 90+1'	Report	Rinaldi (yellow card) 19'; Raggi (yellow card) 29'	Stadium: Stadio Olimpico; Attendance: 28,187; Referee: Andrea Romeo

18 December 2010 17	Milan	0–1	Roma	Milan
20:45 CET (UTC+01:00)	Ibrahimović (yellow card) 90+1'	Report	Brighi (yellow card) 22'; Borriello 69'; Rosi (yellow card) 90+2'; Mexès (yellow card) 90+4'	Stadium: San Siro; Attendance: 53,769; Referee: Antonio Damato

6 January 2011 18	Roma	4–2	Catania	Rome
15:00 CET (UTC+01:00)	Borriello 5', 47'; Vučinić 86', 90+4'; Cassetti (yellow card) 90+2'	Report	Silvestre 29', (yellow card) 75'; López 38'; Ledesma (yellow card) 45+1'; Andújar (yellow card) 48'; Álvarez (yellow card) 62'	Stadium: Stadio Olimpico; Attendance: 32,148; Referee: Christian Brighi

9 January 2011 19	Sampdoria	2–1	Roma	Genoa
12:30 CET (UTC+01:00)	Gastaldello (yellow card) 7' (yellow-red card) 90+1'; Pozzi (yellow card) 38', (goal) 58' (pen.); Lucchini (yellow card) 53' (yellow-red card) 86'; Marilungo (yellow card) 60'; Guberti 84'	Report	Vučinić 17'; Greco (yellow card) 45+1'; Júlio Sérgio (red card) 55'	Stadium: Stadio Luigi Ferraris; Attendance: 22,802; Referee: Gianluca Rocchi

16 January 2011 20	Cesena	0–1	Roma	Cesena
15:00 CET (UTC+01:00)	Colucci (yellow card) 37'; Giaccherini (yellow card) 46'	Report	De Rossi (yellow card) 41'; N. Burdisso (yellow card) 62'; Pellegrino 89' (o.g.)	Stadium: Stadio Dino Manuzzi; Attendance: 19,834; Referee: Antonio Danilo Giannoccaro

22 January 2011 21	Roma	3–0	Cagliari	Rome
20:45 CET (UTC+01:00)	Totti 22' (pen.); Taddei (yellow card) 31'; Perrotta 70'; Ménez 90+2'	Report	Conti (yellow card) 6'; Canini (yellow card) 22'; Nainggolan (yellow card) 35'	Stadium: Stadio Olimpico; Attendance: 28,249; Referee: Gabriele Gava

2 February 2011 23	Roma	1–1	Brescia	Rome
20:45 CET (UTC+01:00)	Borriello 59'; Totti (yellow card) 66'	Report	Zambelli (yellow card) 45'; Zoboli (yellow card) 56'; Éder 69'; Arcari (yellow card) 76'	Stadium: Stadio Olimpico; Attendance: 26,590; Referee: Andrea De Marco

6 February 2011 24	Internazionale	5–3	Roma	Milan
20:45 CET (UTC+01:00)	Sneijder 3'; Eto'o 34', 63' (pen.); Kharja (yellow card) 37'; Motta 71'; Cambiasso 90'	Report	Simplício 13'; Borriello (yellow card) 43'; N. Burdisso (red card) 62'; Vučinić 76'; Loria 81'; De Rossi (yellow card) 88'	Stadium: San Siro; Attendance: 62,344; Referee: Paolo Tagliavento

12 February 2011 25	Roma	0–2	Napoli	Rome
20:45 CET (UTC+01:00)	Rosi (yellow card) 22'; Juan (yellow card) 48'; De Rossi (yellow card) 54'; Perrotta (yellow card) 58'; Cassetti (yellow card) 82'	Report	Lavezzi (yellow card) 21'; Aronica (yellow card) 30'; Dossena (yellow card) 45+1'; Cavani 48' (pen.), 83'; Campagnaro (yellow card) 80'	Stadium: Stadio Olimpico; Attendance: 32,354; Referee: Mauro Bergonzi

20 February 2011 26	Genoa	4–3	Roma	Genoa
15:00 CET (UTC+01:00)	Rafinha (yellow card) 36' (yellow-red card) 90+1'; Palacio 52', 74'; Dainelli (yellow card) 56'; Paloschi 68', 86'	Report	Mexès 6', (yellow card) 44'; N. Burdisso 16'; Greco (yellow card) 23'; Totti (yellow card) 45+2', (goal) 50'; Taddei (yellow card) 69'	Stadium: Stadio Luigi Ferraris; Attendance: 22,180; Referee: Daniele Orsato

23 February 2011 22	Bologna	0–1	Roma	Bologna
18:30 CET (UTC+01:00)	Paponi (yellow card) 81'; Ramírez (yellow card) 90+2'	Report	De Rossi (yellow card) 38', (goal) 45'; Mexès (yellow card) 80'	Stadium: Stadio Renato Dall'Ara; Attendance: 19,663; Referee: Luca Banti
Note: Postponed from 30 January.

27 February 2011 27	Roma	2–2	Parma	Rome
15:00 CET (UTC+01:00)	Totti 19' (pen.), (yellow card) 61'; N. Burdisso (yellow card) 32'; Juan 36'	Report	Zaccardo (yellow card) 9'; Paci (yellow card) 66' (yellow-red card) 80'; Amauri 74', 79'; Džemaili (yellow card) 89'	Stadium: Stadio Olimpico; Attendance: 28,499; Referee: Christian Brighi

4 March 2011 28	Lecce	1–2	Roma	Lecce
20:45 CET (UTC+01:00)	Rispoli (yellow card) 67'; Giacomazzi 75'; Munari (yellow card) 89'	Report	Vučinić 32'; De Rossi (yellow card) 33'; Perrotta (yellow card) 83'; Brighi (yellow card) 88'; Pizarro 90' (pen.)	Stadium: Stadio Via del Mare; Attendance: 10,448; Referee: Antonio Damato

13 March 2011 29	Roma	2–0	Lazio	Rome
15:00 CET (UTC+01:00)	Vučinić (yellow card) 18'; De Rossi (yellow card) 39'; Totti 70', 90+3' (pen.), (yellow card) 90+5'; Pizarro (yellow card) 80'	Report	Lichtsteiner (yellow card) 15'; Radu (red card) 88'; Ledesma (red card) 90+2'	Stadium: Stadio Olimpico; Attendance: 48,955; Referee: Paolo Tagliavento

20 March 2011 30	Fiorentina	2–2	Roma	Florence
15:00 CET (UTC+01:00)	Mutu 22'; Gamberini 35'; Comotto (yellow card) 61'; Natali (yellow card) 90+3'	Report	Totti 28' (pen.), 52'; Mexès (yellow card) 66'; Ménez (yellow card) 82'	Stadium: Stadio Artemio Franchi; Attendance: 23,634; Referee: Paolo Mazzoleni

3 April 2011 31	Roma	0–2	Juventus	Rome
20:45 CEST (UTC+02:00)	Pizarro (yellow card) 32'	Report	Grosso (yellow card) 25'; Krasić 60'; Marchisio (yellow card) 66'; Matri 75'	Stadium: Stadio Olimpico; Attendance: 50,952; Referee: Gianluca Rocchi

9 April 2011 32	Udinese	1–2	Roma	Udine
20:45 CEST (UTC+02:00)	Domizzi (yellow card) 30'; Abdi (yellow card) 64'; Di Natale 88', (yellow card) 88'; Corradi (yellow card) 90+1'; Asamoah (yellow card) 90+3'	Report	Cassetti (yellow card) 22'; Juan (yellow card) 35'; Totti 57' (pen.), 90+4', (yellow card) 89'	Stadium: Stadio Friuli; Attendance: 24,981; Referee: Antonio Damato

16 April 2011 33	Roma	2–3	Palermo	Rome
18:00 CEST (UTC+02:00)	Totti 20' (pen.); Rosi (yellow card) 26'; N. Burdisso (yellow card) 42'; Vučinić 90+2'	Report	Bačinović (yellow card) 19'; Pinilla 43' (pen.); Goian (yellow card) 46'; Hernández 84', 90'	Stadium: Stadio Olimpico; Attendance: 33,851; Referee: Andrea Romeo

23 April 2011 34	Roma	1–0	Chievo	Rome
12:30 CEST (UTC+02:00)	Perrotta 4'; Cassetti (yellow card) 90+3'	Report	Mandelli (yellow card) 80'	Stadium: Stadio Olimpico; Attendance: 27,319; Referee: Nicola Pierpaoli

1 May 2011 35	Bari	2–3	Roma	Bari
20:45 CEST (UTC+02:00)	Bentivoglio 25' (pen.); Huseklepp 42'; Parisi (yellow card) 56'; Romero (yellow card) 66'; Glik (yellow card) 78' (red card) 78'	Report	Totti 30', 57' (pen.); De Rossi (red card) 48'; Perrotta (red card) 90+1'; Rosi 90+5', (yellow card) 90+6'	Stadium: Stadio San Nicola; Attendance: 15,649; Referee: Carmine Russo

7 May 2011 36	Roma	0–0	Milan	Rome
20:45 CEST (UTC+02:00)	Taddei (yellow card) 90+4'	Report	Boateng (yellow card) 55'; Van Bommel (yellow card) 87'; Pato (yellow card) 89'	Stadium: Stadio Olimpico; Attendance: 58,083; Referee: Emidio Morganti

15 May 2011 37	Catania	2–1	Roma	Catania
15:00 CEST (UTC+02:00)	Terlizzi (yellow card) 57'; Bergessio 78'; Gómez 90+5'	Report	Loria 14'; Greco (yellow card) 22'; Rosi (yellow card) 68'; Simplício (yellow card) 83'	Stadium: Stadio Angelo Massimino; Attendance: 19,083; Referee: Paolo Tagliavento

22 May 2011 38	Roma	3–1	Sampdoria	Rome
20:45 CEST (UTC+02:00)	Totti 30'; N. Burdisso (yellow card) 39'; Vučinić 70'; Borriello 86'	Report	Mannini 26'; Volta (yellow card) 52'; Martínez (yellow card) 85'	Stadium: Stadio Olimpico; Attendance: 28,944; Referee: Luca Banti

=== Coppa Italia ===
19 January 2011 Round of 16	Roma	2–1	Lazio	Rome
21:00 CET (UTC+01:00)	De Rossi (yellow card) 30'; Borriello 53' (pen.); Juan (yellow card) 57'; Simplício 77', (yellow card) 84'		Radu (yellow card) 20'; Hernanes 57' (pen.); Ledesma (yellow card) 90'; Biava (yellow card) 90+2'	Stadium: Stadio Olimpico; Attendance: 40,637; Referee: Mauro Bergonzi

27 January 2011 Quarter-finals	Juventus	0–2	Roma	Turin
20:45 CET (UTC+01:00)	Motta (yellow card) 30'		Mexès (yellow card) 23'; Vučinić 65'; Taddei 90+1'	Stadium: Stadio Olimpico di Torino; Attendance: 18,300; Referee: Antonio Damato

19 April 2011 Semi-finals; First leg	Roma	0–1	Internazionale	Rome
20:45 CEST (UTC+02:00)	Taddei (yellow card) 5'; N. Burdisso (yellow card) 51'		Maicon (yellow card) 14'; Stanković 45'; Ranocchia (yellow card) 57'; Sneijder (yellow card) 59'	Stadium: Stadio Olimpico; Attendance: 23,979; Referee: Nicola Rizzoli

11 May 2011 Semi-finals; Second leg	Internazionale	1–1 (2–1 agg.)	Roma	Milan
20:45 CEST (UTC+02:00)	Eto'o 58'; Chivu (yellow card) 67'; Maicon (yellow card) 87'		Borriello 85'; N. Burdisso (yellow card) 89'; Taddei (yellow card) 90'	Stadium: San Siro; Attendance: 33,094; Referee: Daniele Orsato

=== UEFA Champions League ===
==== Group stage ====
Pos	Team	Pld	W	D	L	GF	GA	GD	Pts	Qualification
1	(Germany) Bayern Munich	6	5	0	1	16	6	+10	15	Advance to knockout phase
2	(Italy) Roma	6	3	1	2	10	11	−1	10	Advance to knockout phase
3	(Switzerland) Basel	6	2	0	4	8	11	−3	6	Transfer to Europa League
4	(Romania) CFR Cluj	6	1	1	4	6	12	−6	4	

Source: Soccerway

15 September 2010 1	Bayern Munich (Germany)	2–0	(Italy) Roma	Munich, Germany
20:45 CEST (UTC+02:00)	Müller 79'; Gómez (yellow card) 80'; Klose 83'	Report		Stadium: Allianz Arena; Attendance: 66,000; Referee: Stéphane Lannoy (France)

28 September 2010 2	Roma (Italy)	2–1	(Romania) CFR Cluj	Rome, Italy
20:45 CEST (UTC+02:00)	Mexès 69'; Borriello 71'	Report	Dică (yellow card) 74'; Rada 78'	Stadium: Stadio Olimpico; Attendance: 30,252; Referee: Jonas Eriksson (Sweden)

19 October 2010 3	Roma (Italy)	1–3	(Switzerland) Basel	Rome, Italy
20:45 CEST (UTC+02:00)	Borriello 21'; Cassetti (yellow card) 53'	Report	Frei 12'; Inkoom 44', (yellow card) 44'; Chipperfield (yellow card) 73'; Cabral 90+3'	Stadium: Stadio Olimpico; Attendance: 22,365; Referee: Aleksei Nikolaev (Russia)

3 November 2010 4	Basel (Switzerland)	2–3	(Italy) Roma	Basel, Switzerland
20:45 CET (UTC+01:00)	Stocker (yellow card) 25' (yellow-red card) 90+1'; Streller (yellow card) 49'; Frei 69'; Shaqiri 83'	Report	Ménez 16', (yellow card) 75'; Totti 25' (pen.); Cassetti (yellow card) 49'; Perrotta (yellow card) 50'; Greco 76'	Stadium: St. Jakob-Park; Attendance: 36,375; Referee: Björn Kuipers (Netherlands)

23 November 2010 5	Roma (Italy)	3–2	(Germany) Bayern Munich	Rome, Italy
20:45 CET (UTC+01:00)	Greco (yellow card) 13'; Mexès (yellow card) 21'; Borriello 49'; De Rossi (yellow card) 71', (goal) 81'; Totti 84' (pen.); Ménez (yellow card) 90'	Report	Kroos (yellow card) 19'; Gómez 33', 39'; Kraft (yellow card) 83'	Stadium: Stadio Olimpico; Attendance: 42,789; Referee: Alberto Undiano Mallenco (Spain)

8 December 2010 6	CFR Cluj (Romania)	1–1	(Italy) Roma	Cluj-Napoca, Romania
20:45 CET (UTC+01:00)	Culio (yellow card) 19'; Traoré 88', (yellow card) 88'	Report	Borriello 21'	Stadium: Stadionul Dr. Constantin Rădulescu; Attendance: 12,800; Referee: Willie Collum (Scotland)

==== Knockout phase ====
===== Round of 16 =====
16 February 2011 First leg	Roma (Italy)	2–3	(Ukraine) Shakhtar Donetsk	Rome, Italy
20:45 CET (UTC+01:00)	Raț 28' (o.g.); Ménez 61', (yellow card) 75'; Cassetti (yellow card) 64'; Perrotta (yellow card) 77'	Report	Jádson 29'; Chyhrynskyi (yellow card) 34'; Douglas Costa 36'; Luiz Adriano 41', (yellow card) 61'; Rakitskiy (yellow card) 85'; Pyatov (yellow card) 88'	Stadium: Stadio Olimpico; Attendance: 35,873; Referee: Olegário Benquerença (Portugal)

8 March 2011 Second leg	Shakhtar Donetsk (Ukraine)	3–0 (6–2 agg.)	(Italy) Roma	Donetsk, Ukraine
20:45 CET (UTC+01:00)	Willian 18', 58'; Mkhitaryan (yellow card) 28'; Srna (yellow card) 45+4'; Eduardo 87'	Report	Mexès (yellow card) 23' (yellow-red card) 41'; Pizarro (yellow card) 57'; Perrotta (yellow card) 65'; Riise (yellow card) 82'	Stadium: Donbas Arena; Attendance: 46,543; Referee: Howard Webb (England)

== Statistics ==
=== Appearances and goals ===
No.	Pos	Nat	Player	Total		Serie A		Supercoppa Italiana		Coppa Italia		Champions League	
No.	Pos	Nat	Player	Apps	Goals	Apps	Goals	Apps	Goals	Apps	Goals	Apps	Goals
Goalkeepers
1	GK	(Romania) ROU	Bogdan Lobonț	10	0	6	0	1	0	0	0	3	0
27	GK	(Brazil) BRA	Júlio Sérgio	24	0	19	0	0	0	2	0	3	0
32	GK	(Brazil) BRA	Doni	20	0	13+3	0	0	0	2	0	2	0
Defenders
3	DF	(Italy) ITA	Paolo Castellini	11	0	6+1	0	0	0	0	0	2+2	0
4	DF	(Brazil) BRA	Juan	28	1	20+1	1	1	0	3	0	3	0
5	DF	(France) FRA	Philippe Mexès	26	2	16+1	1	1	0	2	0	6	1
15	DF	(Italy) ITA	Simone Loria	2	1	0+2	1	0	0	0	0	0	0
17	DF	(Norway) NOR	John Arne Riise	29	0	19	0	1	0	4	0	5	0
25	DF	(Argentina) ARG	Guillermo Burdisso	3	0	0+2	0	0	0	0	0	0+1	0
29	DF	(Argentina) ARG	Nicolás Burdisso	28	2	16	2	0	0	4	0	8	0
77	DF	(Italy) ITA	Marco Cassetti	34	0	23	0	1	0	3	0	6+1	0
87	DF	(Italy) ITA	Aleandro Rosi	12	0	3+6	0	0	0	0+1	0	1+1	0
Midfielders
7	MF	(Chile) CHI	David Pizarro	17	0	9	0	1	0	2	0	4+1	0
11	MF	(Brazil) BRA	Rodrigo Taddei	17	1	5+6	0	0+1	0	1+1	1	3	0
16	MF	(Italy) ITA	Daniele De Rossi	31	3	19	2	1	0	4	0	7	1
20	MF	(Italy) ITA	Simone Perrotta	28	2	16+2	2	1	0	3	0	6	0
23	MF	(Italy) ITA	Leandro Greco	16	1	7+4	0	0	0	1+1	0	1+2	1
30	MF	(Brazil) BRA	Fábio Simplício	27	5	16+4	4	0	0	3+1	1	2+1	0
33	MF	(Italy) ITA	Matteo Brighi	25	1	10+8	1	0	0	2	0	4+1	0
Forwards
9	FW	(Montenegro) MNE	Mirko Vučinić	27	8	13+4	7	1	0	2+2	1	5	0
10	FW	(Italy) ITA	Francesco Totti	29	6	19+2	4	1	0	0	0	6+1	2
22	FW	(Italy) ITA	Marco Borriello	36	16	21+3	10	0	0	3+1	2	5+3	4
47	FW	(Italy) ITA	Gianluca Caprari	2	0	0	0	0	0	0+1	0	0+1	0
94	FW	(France) FRA	Jérémy Ménez	34	4	17+6	2	1	0	2+2	0	5+1	2
Players transferred out during the season
2	DF	(Brazil) BRA	Cicinho	8	0	3+3	0	0	0	0	0	1+1	0
8	FW	(Brazil) BRA	Adriano	8	0	2+3	0	0+1	0	1	0	0+1	0
19	FW	(Brazil) BRA	Júlio Baptista	8	0	0+7	0	0	0	0	0	0+1	0
89	FW	(Italy) ITA	Stefano Okaka	5	0	0+4	0	0+1	0	0	0	0	0

Last updated: 22 May 2011
Source: Competitions

=== Goalscorers ===
Rank	No.	Pos	Nat	Name	Serie A	Supercoppa	Coppa Italia	UEFA CL	Total
1	10	FW	(Italy)	Francesco Totti	15	0	0	2	17
1	22	FW	(Italy)	Marco Borriello	11	0	2	4	17
3	9	FW	(Montenegro)	Mirko Vučinić	10	0	1	0	11
4	30	MF	(Brazil)	Fábio Simplício	4	0	1	0	5
5	94	FW	(France)	Jérémy Ménez	2	0	0	2	4
6	16	MF	(Italy)	Daniele De Rossi	2	0	0	1	3
6	20	MF	(Italy)	Simone Perrotta	3	0	0	0	3
8	4	DF	(Brazil)	Juan	2	0	0	0	2
8	5	DF	(France)	Philippe Mexès	1	0	0	1	2
8	15	DF	(Italy)	Simone Loria	2	0	0	0	2
8	29	DF	(Argentina)	Nicolás Burdisso	2	0	0	0	2
12	7	MF	(Chile)	David Pizarro	1	0	0	0	1
12	11	MF	(Brazil)	Rodrigo Taddei	0	0	1	0	1
12	17	DF	(Norway)	John Arne Riise	0	1	0	0	1
12	23	MF	(Italy)	Leandro Greco	0	0	0	1	1
12	33	MF	(Italy)	Matteo Brighi	1	0	0	0	1
12	87	DF	(Italy)	Aleandro Rosi	1	0	0	0	1
Own goal					2	0	0	1	3
Totals					59	1	5	12	77

Last updated: 22 May 2011

=== Clean sheets ===
Rank	No.	Pos	Nat	Name	Serie A	Supercoppa	Coppa Italia	UEFA CL	Total
1	27	GK	(Brazil)	Júlio Sérgio	6	0	1	0	7
2	32	GK	(Brazil)	Doni	5	0	0	0	5
3	1	GK	(Romania)	Bogdan Lobonț	3	0	0	0	3
Totals					14	0	1	0	15

Last updated: 22 May 2011
