= 2002–03 Empoli FC season =

Empoli F.C.
2002–03 season
- Chairman: Fabrizio Corsi
- Manager: Silvio Baldini
- Stadium: Stadio Carlo Castellani
- Serie A: 13th
- Coppa Italia: Quarter-finals
- Top goalscorer: Antonio Di Natale (13)

During the 2002–03 Italian football season, Empoli F.C. competed in the Serie A.

== Kit ==
Empoli's kit was manufactured by Italian sports retailer Erreà and sponsored by Sammontana.

== Squad ==
=== Goalkeepers ===
- (Italy) Gianluca Berti
- (Italy) Mario Cassano
- (Italy) Giacomo Mazzi

=== Defenders ===
- (Italy) Gianluca Atzori
- (Italy) Manuel Belleri
- (Brazil) Cribari
- (Italy) Andrea Cupi
- (Italy) Stefano Lucchini

=== Midfielders ===
- (Italy) Alessandro Agostini
- (Italy) Marco Barollo
- (Italy) Antonio Buscè
- (Italy) Fabrizio Ficini
- (Italy) Flavio Giampieretti
- (Australia) Vincenzo Grella
- (Italy) Francesco Lodi
- (Italy) Francesco Pratali
- (Italy) Ighli Vannucchi

=== Attackers ===
- (Italy) Marco Borriello
- (Italy) Massimiliano Cappellini
- (Italy) Antonio Di Natale
- (Italy) Gaetano Grieco
- (Italy) Tommaso Rocchi
- (Italy) Luca Saudati
- (Italy) Francesco Tavano

== Serie A ==
Pos	Team	Pld	W	D	L	GF	GA	GD	Pts	Qualification or relegation
11	Bologna	34	10	11	13	39	47	−8	41	
12	Modena	34	9	11	14	30	48	−18	38 (Note: Modena finished ahead of Empoli, Atalanta and Reggina on head-to-head points: Modena: 10 pts, Empoli: 9 pts, Atalanta: 7 pts, Reggina: 5 pts.)	
13	Empoli	34	9	11	14	36	46	−10	38	
14	Reggina	34	10	8	16	38	53	−15	38	Relegation tie-breaker
15	Atalanta (R)	34	8	14	12	35	47	−12	38	Serie B after tie-breaker (Note: Atalanta to 2003–04 Serie B after tie-breaker.)

Source: 2002–03 Serie A, Soccerway
Rules for classification: 1) Points; 2) Head-to-head points; 3) Head-to-head goal difference; 4) Goal difference; 5) Goals scored; 6) Draw. (Note: Head-to-head record is used only after all the matches between the teams in question have been played).
(R) Relegated
