= Simone Pavan =

Italian football coach and former player (born 1974)

Personal information
- Date of birth: 29 April 1974 (age 52)
- Place of birth: Latisana, Italy
- Height: 1.85 m (6 ft 1 in)
- Position: Central defender

Youth career
- 1991–93: Atalanta

Senior career*
Years	Team	Apps	(Gls)
1993–1995	Atalanta	46	(0)
1995–2002	Venezia	175	(3)
2002–2004	Modena	36	(0)
2004–2006	Sampdoria	46	(0)
2006–2008	Livorno	29	(1)
2008–2009	Portogruaro	8	(0)
2009–2010	Sandonà	24	(2)

International career
1993–1995	Italy U-21	3	(0)

Managerial career
- 2012–2013: Portogruaro (youth)
- 2013–2015: Modena (youth)
- 2015: Modena
- 2016: Modena
- 2017–2019: Sampdoria (youth)
- 2019–2020: Vis Pesaro
- * Club domestic league appearances and goals

Simone Pavan (born 29 April 1974) is an Italian football coach and former player.

== Playing career ==
He spent most of his career with S.S.C. Venezia in both Serie A and Serie B, and has also represented Atalanta B.C., Modena F.C., U.C. Sampdoria, and A.S. Livorno Calcio in the top-flight Serie A championship. He also played three games for the Italy national under-21 football team.

== Coaching career ==
He took over his first head coaching role at Modena, first serving as a caretaker after Walter Novellino's dismissal in March 2015. He then returned to his previous role as youth coach, only to be reappointed in charge of the first team for the 2016–17 season after the club's relegation to Lega Pro.

However, his first full-time stint as a head coach turned out to be unsuccessful. He was removed from managerial duties on 26 November 2016, with Modena deep into the relegation zone.

On 3 July 2019, he was appointed head coach of Serie C club Vis Pesaro. On 18 February 2020, he was dismissed by Vis Pesaro after the club only gained 2 points in the previous 5 games, including two 0–4 losses.
