= Niccolò Giannetti =

Italian footballer

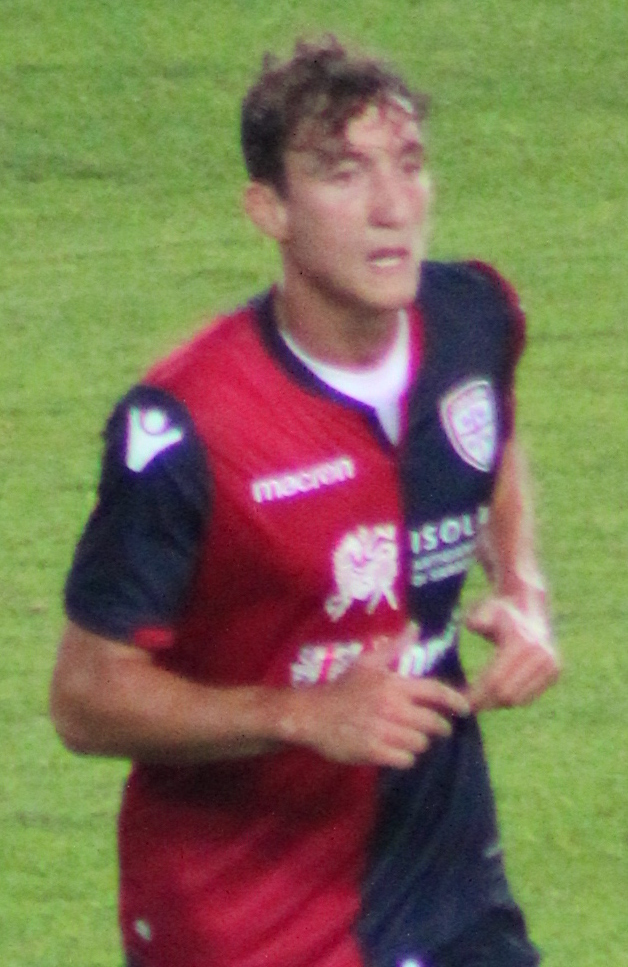
- Giannetti in 2017

Personal information
- Date of birth: 12 May 1991 (age 35)
- Place of birth: Siena, Italy
- Height: 1.74 m (5 ft 9 in)
- Position: Striker

Team information
- Current team: Siena

Senior career*
Years	Team	Apps	(Gls)
2009–2014	Siena	17	(7)
2010–2011	→ Juventus (loan)	1	(0)
2011–2012	→ Gubbio (loan)	7	(0)
2012	→ Südtirol (loan)	13	(2)
2012–2013	→ Cittadella (loan)	21	(5)
2014–2015	Spezia	39	(12)
2015–2019	Cagliari	48	(10)
2017	→ Spezia (loan)	10	(1)
2018–2019	→ Livorno (loan)	25	(8)
2019–2021	Salernitana	32	(2)
2021	→ Pescara (loan)	9	(0)
2021–2024	Carrarese	56	(7)
2024–	Siena	0	(0)

International career
2009	Italy U18	1	(0)
2009	Italy U19	1	(0)
2009–2010	Italy U20	5	(1)
2011	Italy U21	1	(0)
- * Club domestic league appearances and goals as of 4 May 2024

Niccolò Giannetti (born 12 May 1991) is an Italian professional footballer who plays as a striker for Serie D club Siena.

== Club career ==
Giannetti signed on loan for Juventus from Siena for the 2010–11 season. He made his professional debut for Juventus in the UEFA Europa League, in a match against Austrian team Red Bull Salzburg on 4 November 2010. Giannetti scored his first goal for Juventus on 16 December 2010 in a UEFA Europa League match against English team Manchester City. He made his Serie A debut one month later, on 16 January 2011, as a starter in a home league game against Bari. After returning to Siena, he was subsequently re-loaned out to newly promoted Serie B side Gubbio. In January 2012, he left for South Tyrol. (German: Südtirol, Italian: Alto Adige)

On 31 August 2012, he was signed by Serie B club Cittadella.

In the 2013–14 Serie B season, he became a main striker in the first team of Siena, scoring 7 league goals. On 23 January 2014, he signed a new one-year contract with Siena. However, on 31 January 2014, Giannetti was signed by fellow Serie B team Spezia in a co-ownership deal with Siena. In June 2014 Spezia signed him outright.

On 26 July 2018, Giannetti signed to Livorno on loan until 30 June 2019.

On 17 July 2019, Giannetti signed to Salernitana a 3-years contract. On 1 February 2021, he was loaned to Pescara.

On 5 November 2021, he signed with Carrarese on a one-year deal with an option to extend for the second year.

In August 2024 he signed for Siena.

== International career ==
On 8 February 2011, Giannetti made his debut with the Italy U-21 in a friendly match against England played in Empoli.

== Career statistics ==
As of match played 22 December 2021

Appearances and goals by club, season and competition
Club	Season	League			National Cup		Continental		Other		Total	
Club	Season	Division	Apps	Goals	Apps	Goals	Apps	Goals	Apps	Goals	Apps	Goals
Siena	2009–10	Serie A	0	0	1	0	—		—		1	0
Siena	2012–13	Serie A	0	0	0	0	—		—		0	0
Siena	2013–14	Serie B	17	7	4	1	—		—		21	8
Siena	Total		17	7	5	1	0	0	0	0	22	8
Juventus (loan)	2010–11	Serie A	1	0	0	0	2 (Note: Appearance(s) in UEFA Europa League)	1	—		3	1
Gubbio (loan)	2011–12	Serie B	7	0	2	3	—		—		9	3
Südtirol (loan)	2011–12	Serie C	13	2	0	0	—		—		13	2
Cittadella (loan)	2012–13	Serie B	21	5	0	0	—		—		21	5
Spezia	2013–14	Serie B	12	5	0	0	—		—		12	5
Spezia	2014–15	Serie B	27	7	0	0	—		1 (Note: Appearance(s) in Promotion Playoffs)	0	28	6
Spezia	Total		39	12	0	0	0	0	1	0	40	12
Cagliari	2015–16	Serie B	29	9	4	0	—		—		33	9
Cagliari	2016–17	Serie A	11	0	1	0	—		—		12	0
Cagliari	2017–18	Serie A	8	0	1	0	—		—		9	0
Cagliari	Total		48	9	6	0	0	0	0	0	54	9
Spezia (loan)	2016–17	Serie B	9	1	0	0	—		1	0	10	1
Livorno (loan)	2018–19	Serie B	25	8	2	1	—		—		27	9
Salernitana	2019–20	Serie B	19	2	2	2	—		—		21	4
Salernitana	2020–21	Serie B	13	0	2	0	—		—		15	0
Salernitana	Total		32	2	4	2	0	0	0	0	36	4
Pescara (loan)	2020–21	Serie B	9	0	0	0	—		—		9	0
Carrarese	2021–22	Serie C	5	0	0	0	—		—		5	0
Career total			226	45	19	7	2	1	2	0	249	53
