= Fabio Borriello =

Italian footballer (born 1985)

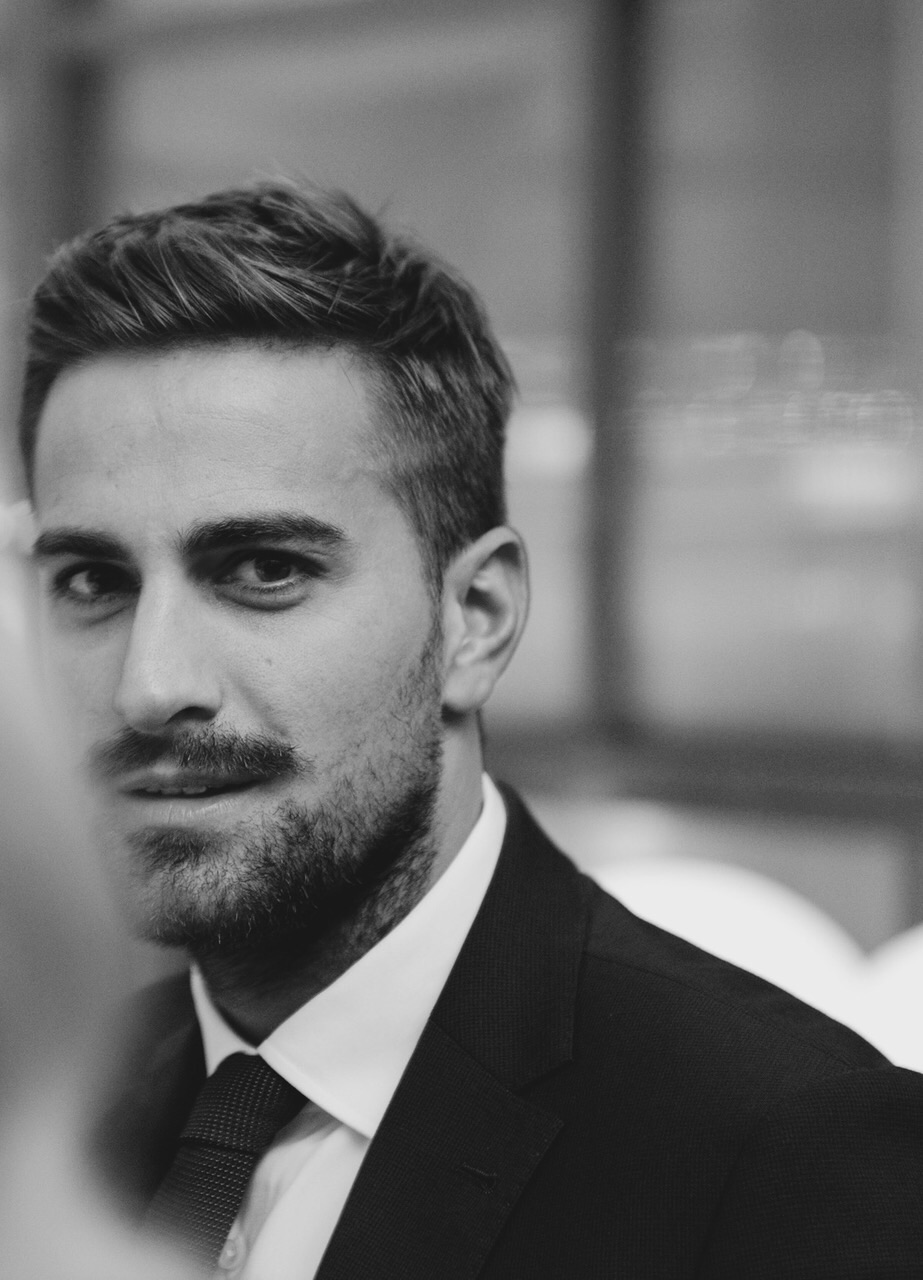

Personal information
- Full name: Fabio Borriello
- Date of birth: 16 December 1985 (age 40)
- Place of birth: Naples, Italy
- Height: 1.86 m (6 ft 1 in)
- Position: Defender

Senior career*
Years	Team	Apps	(Gls)
2004–2005	Cervia	29	(2)
2005–2007	Milan	0	(0)
2005	→ Lecco (loan)	5	(0)
2006–2007	→ Pro Vasto (loan)	16	(0)
2007–2008	AC Lugano	14	(1)
- * Club domestic league appearances and goals

Fabio Borriello (born 16 December 1985) is an Italian former professional footballer who played as a defender.

== Career ==
After starting his career with Eccellenza side Cervia, Borriello won a professional contract with Milan in 2005 through a football Reality television show called Campioni, il sogno. He was sent on loan to Serie C2 clubs Lecco and Pro Vasto, but still had limited playing opportunities.

On 21 July 2007, he was transferred to Swiss Challenge League side AC Lugano.

== Personal life ==
Fabio is the brother of fellow Italian footballer Marco, who formerly represented Italy at international level. After retiring from football he became the CEO of the real estate company FB Internazionale SAGL.
