= Marco Borriello =

Italian professional footballer (born 1982)

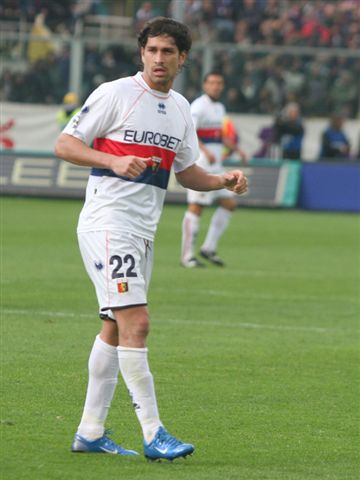
- Borriello playing for Genoa in 2008

Personal information
- Full name: Marco Borriello
- Date of birth: 18 June 1982 (age 44)
- Place of birth: Naples, Italy
- Height: 1.86 m (6 ft 1 in)
- Position: Striker

Youth career
- 1996–1999: Milan
- 1999–2001: Treviso

Senior career*
Years	Team	Apps	(Gls)
2001–2002	Treviso	27	(16)
2001	→ Triestina (loan)	9	(2)
2002–2007	Milan	16	(4)
2003	→ Empoli (loan)	12	(1)
2004–2005	→ Reggina (loan)	30	(3)
2005–2006	→ Sampdoria (loan)	11	(4)
2006	→ Treviso (loan)	20	(7)
2007–2008	Genoa	35	(19)
2008–2010	Milan	37	(20)
2010–2015	Roma	52	(24)
2012	→ Juventus (loan)	13	(2)
2012–2013	→ Genoa (loan)	28	(12)
2014	→ West Ham United (loan)	2	(0)
2015	Genoa	8	(0)
2015–2016	Carpi	12	(5)
2016	Atalanta	15	(8)
2016–2017	Cagliari	36	(20)
2017–2018	SPAL	15	(1)
2018–2019	Ibiza	7	(0)
Total		385	(127)

International career
2001–2002	Italy U20	3	(1)
2002–2003	Italy U21	12	(6)
2008–2011	Italy	7	(0)
- * Club domestic league appearances and goals

Marco Borriello (Italian pronunciation: [ˈmarko borˈrjɛllo]; born 18 June 1982) is an Italian former professional footballer who played as a striker.

Throughout his career, Borriello played for several Italian clubs, including Treviso, Triestina, Milan, Empoli, Reggina, Sampdoria, Genoa, Roma, Juventus, Carpi, Atalanta, Cagliari and SPAL, as well as English side West Ham United and Spanish side Ibiza. At international level, he has represented the Italy national team and took part at UEFA Euro 2008.

== Club career ==
=== Early career ===
Borriello came up through the ranks of Milan but was transferred to Treviso on loan before having the chance to prove himself at the first team. He scored eight goals for Treviso reserves in the 2000–01 season. After another move ca. January 2001, he made his professional debut for Triestina in 2000–01 Serie C2 (the fourth division), subsequently returning to Treviso in June 2001, via Milan. His 10 goals in 27 Serie C1 games with Treviso led to Milan's recalling him in June 2002.

=== Milan ===
Borriello made his Serie A debut for Milan on 21 September 2002 against Perugia but failed to establish himself and spent much of the next few years on loan at other Serie A clubs.

After only three league appearances for Milan, he was loaned out to Empoli for the rest of the 2002–03 Serie A season. He returned to Milan for the entire 2003–04 season, but played in just four league games. In the 2004–05 season, he was on loan at Reggina. In the 2005–06 season, he was once again sent on loan, this time to Sampdoria along with Milan teammates Samuele Dalla Bona and Ignazio Abate. Borriello left Sampdoria in January 2006 for a six-month loan stint at Treviso where he scored his then-career best of five Serie A goals. Treviso, however, were relegated to Serie B that season.

Borriello was recalled to Milan's first team in the summer of 2006 after Andriy Shevchenko was sold to Chelsea and Marcio Amoroso terminated his contract. However, once again he became only a fourth-choice striker, this time behind Filippo Inzaghi, Alberto Gilardino, and Ricardo Oliveira. Moreover, his career was briefly put in jeopardy when on 21 December 2006 it was revealed that he tested positive for prednisolone and prednisone after the 11th game of the 2006–07 Serie A season against AS Roma played on 11 November 2006. After confirmation of the test results in January 2007, he was suspended until 21 March 2007. As a result of his suspension, he was also excluded from the club's Champions League squad list and, therefore, was not able to participate in any playoff games leading up to Milan's victory over Liverpool in the final.

=== Genoa ===
On 21 June 2007, Borriello was sold to Genoa in a co-ownership deal with Milan, for €1.8 million. Borriello helped newly promoted Genoa get their first win of the season, scoring his first hat-trick at the expense of Udinese. The game ended 3–2, with the striker scoring from the penalty spot in the 76th minute. Incidentally, in the return fixture on 24 February 2008 in Udine, Borriello hit another hat-trick in a 5–3 away win, reaching 15 league goals in the process. He finished the season with 19, making him the third-highest goalscorer in the league behind Juventus pair Alessandro Del Piero and David Trezeguet.

=== Return to Milan ===
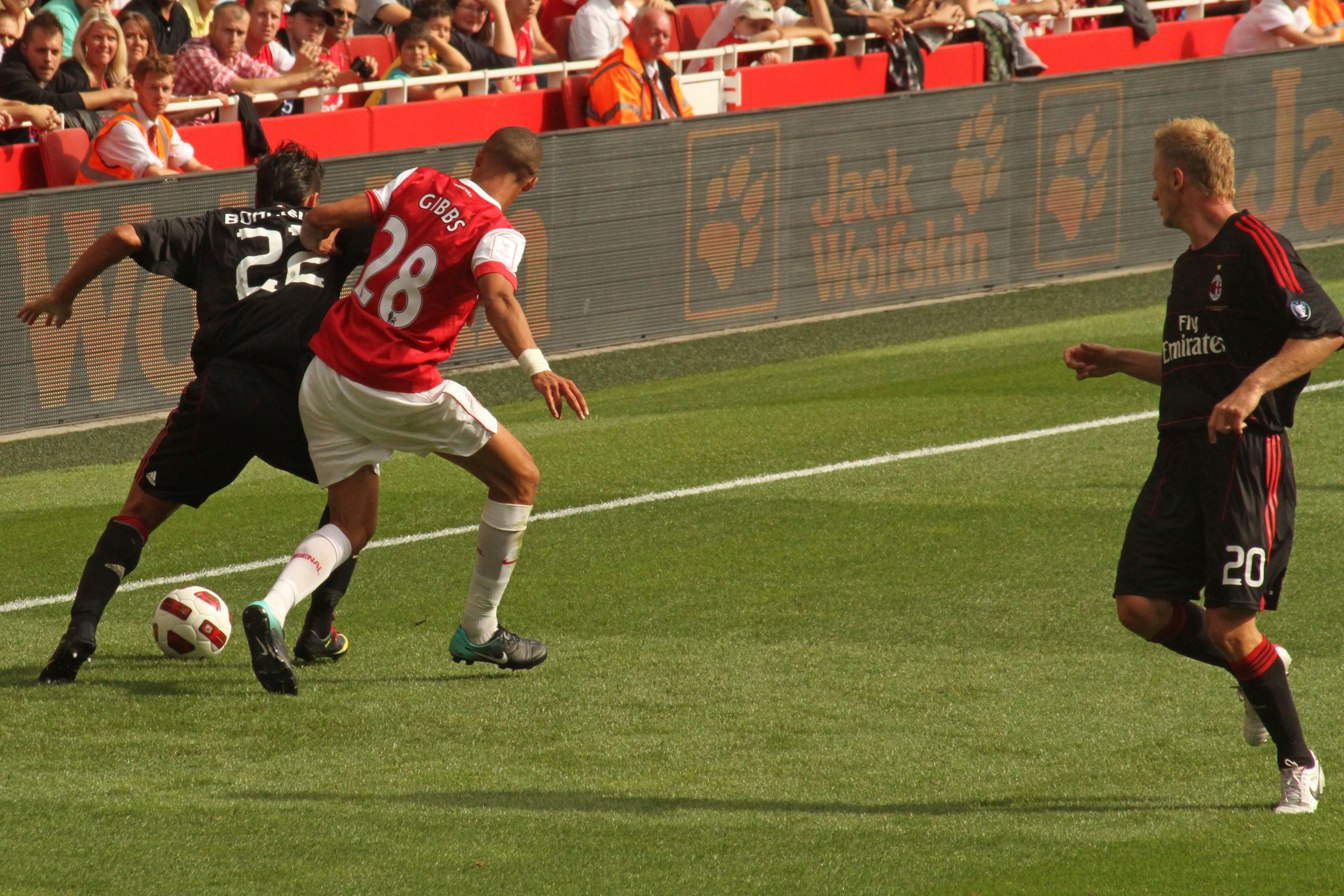
Borriello (number shirt 22) clashed with Arsenal's Kieran Gibbs.

Following the sale of striker Alberto Gilardino to Fiorentina, it was confirmed on 29 May 2008 that Borriello would return to Milan as his replacement. The deal included the move of Davide Di Gennaro to Genoa under a co-ownership deal for €2.5 million, in addition to a €7.5 million fee. (However, Di Gennaro was devalued to €1.25 million when he returned to Milan a year later, which made the return of Borriello had cost Milan €8.75 million).

Shortly before the signing of Ronaldinho by Milan, Borriello's agent claimed his client might look for playing time at a different club if the club bought another striker. The acquisition of Ronaldinho was not perceived as a threat to Borriello's position, given the Brazilian's tactical role as a supporting striker or attacking midfielder.

==== 2008–09 season ====
In Borriello's first season of his second spell at Milan, he made just seven Serie A appearances, scoring just one goal, which came against Reggina. He also scored against FC Zürich in the UEFA Cup, but an unfortunate injury kept him out of action for the rest of the season. After Kaká left the club in the summer 2009 transfer window, Borriello chose to switch to shirt number 22, which he had worn at Genoa.

==== 2009–10 season ====
After a disappointing first season, Borriello scored his first ever brace for the Rossoneri in their 2–0 win over Parma on 1 November 2009. On 25 November, Borriello scored his first UEFA Champions League goal in a match against Marseille which finished 1–1. Borriello scored another brace in Milan's 5–2 defeat of former club Genoa, one of his goals being an acrobatic bicycle kick from a cross from Ronaldinho. The following week, Borriello scored a lovely goal against Siena when he hooked a 30-yard chipped pass from Andrea Pirlo into the top corner of the net. On 21 February 2010, Borriello scored his fourth volley of the season in Milan's 2–0 win over Bari. On 11 April, he scored two second half goals to help Milan come from 2–0 down to draw against Catania Calcio. Borriello finished the season with 14 league goals in 26 appearances.

=== Roma ===
==== 2010–11 season ====
Borriello started the first game of the season for Milan against Lecce. On 31 August 2010, he was loaned to Roma for free (where he then scored the winning goal against Milan at the San Siro on 19 December), with the obligation to purchase the player's rights before the 2011–12 season for a total of €10 million split over three years (a general practice in Italy), as a direct consequence of the arrival of forwards Zlatan Ibrahimović and Robinho. Borriello signed a 1+4-year contract; in the first year he would earn €4.5 million (in gross/pre-tax salary, excluded bonuses), an amount increasing to €5.4 million in the following years. His agent revealed that he almost joined English side Manchester City, but joined Roma, thanks to conviction and passion from Rosella Sensi, Roma's chairwoman.

He made his Roma debut on 11 September 2010, as Roma lost 5–1 loss against Cagliari. In back-to-back matches on 19 and 22 September 2010, he scored against Bologna and Brescia. A week later, on 28 September 2010, in the Champions League, he scored his first goal in the Champions League in a 2–1 win over CFR Cluj. This was followed up, on 19 October 2010, in a 3–1 loss against FC Basel. His third came when he scored the first goal for Roma in a match before winning a penalty, allowing Francesco Totti to score a winner. He scored his fourth European goal in the final game of Roma's group stage campaign, as Roma settled a draw with Cluj. In the Derby della Capitale against Rome rivals Lazio, Borriello scored the opener in the second half as Roma win 2–0 and scored again from the penalty, on 19 January 2011, in the round of 16 of the Coppa Italia, which Roma won 2–1 once more.

Borriello finished with 17 goals (in all competitions) for Roma in the 2010–11 season, making him a second top scorer behind Francesco Totti.

==== 2011–12 season ====
With the arrival of new coach Luis Enrique, Borriello came to be considered surplus to the team's needs. He spent the first half of the season on the bench, playing just seven matches of which he started in only two.

=== Juventus ===
Borriello was signed by Juventus in January 2012 on a half-season loan from Roma for €500,000, with the option to buy him for €8 million at the end of the season. Borriello also received a leaving incentive of €275,000 from Roma, which de facto came from the loan income that Juventus paid. After his official unveiling as a Juventus player to Italian press, Borriello met with a hostile reception from Juventus fans. This was due to him moving to Roma, rather than to Juventus two years previous.

He scored his first Juventus goal in a win against Cesena on 25 April. After scoring his first goal, Borriello says his goal was dedicated to Andrea Fortunato, who died on 25 April 1995 at the age of 23 after contracting pneumonia. He scored again in the next game, a 4–0 win at Novara, which secured Juventus' first Serie A title since 2003. On 30 June, Borriello returned to Roma despite wishing to sign permanently for Juventus.

=== Return to Genoa ===
Juventus opted not to purchase Borriello after his loan spell at the club and he returned to Roma. However, he was not in new coach Zdeněk Zeman's plans and he was placed on the transfer list. On 31 August 2012, the final day of the Italian transfer market, Genoa signed him from Roma and sent Alberto Gilardino to Bologna, also in temporary deal. Genoa paid Roma €250,000 with part of his wages being paid by Roma.

After making eight appearances and scoring three times, Borriello then suffered a trauma injury in the right ankle, putting him out of action for 45 days. Despite the injury, Borriello ended the season as the club's top scorer, and they avoided relegation by one place in the league table.

=== Return to Roma ===
With Genoa deciding not to purchase Borriello in full after his loan spell at the club, he returned to Roma. He started in the first game of the season against Livorno, playing 60 minutes. On 31 October 2013, he scored a historical winner against Chievo, helping the team maintain its 100% record after ten games. It was his first goal of the 2013–14 season.

=== West Ham United ===
On 25 January 2014, Borriello signed for West Ham United on loan for the remainder of the season for €700,000. He made only two substitute appearances for West Ham before a calf-strain injury in February marked the end of his playing time for the London-based club.

=== Later years ===
After not making any appearances for Roma in the 2014–15 season, Borriello sealed a permanent return to Genoa for the third time on the final day of the January 2015 transfer window.

On 3 August 2016, Borriello joined newly promoted Cagliari on a free transfer. He scored four goals on his competitive debut for the club in a 5–1 2016–17 Coppa Italia win over Serie B side SPAL on 15 August.

On 19 August 2017, Borriello signed with Serie A newcomers SPAL. He made 15 appearances and scored 1 goal for the club.

On 27 August 2018, Borriello joined Segunda División B club UD Ibiza. On 16 September, he made his official debut in a loss to Badajoz. On 30 January 2019 he announced his retirement through his Instagram profile, after having consensually terminated his contract with the club, concluding his spell on the Balearic Island with only 7 appearances and no goals to his name.

== International career ==
Borriello received his first Italy national team call-up for a friendly against Portugal, which took place on 6 February 2008 in Zürich. He replaced Luca Toni for the final 20 minutes, with Italy winning 3–1. He also played in the next two friendlies, coming on as a substitute for Toni on both occasions. Borriello was included in Roberto Donadoni's Italy squad for UEFA Euro 2008 but did not play. He was also in Marcello Lippi's 28-man provisional 2010 FIFA World Cup squad but was not included in the 23-man final squad.

== Style of play ==
A left-footed striker, Borriello is known for his eye for goal, as well as his strength, ability in the air, and heading accuracy, which enables him to function as a target-man; being an aerial presence, and possessing a powerful shot, he is also gifted acrobatically and has a penchant for scoring goals from volleys. His technique and physique aid him in holding up the ball and laying it off for his teammates when playing with his back to the goal. He is mainly known for operating in the penalty area, he has also drawn praise for his defensive contribution off the ball and willingness to track back.

== Personal life ==
Borriello grew up in the area of San Giovanni a Teduccio in Naples. His father was killed by the camorra when Marco was still a child and he was raised along with siblings Fabio (who was also a footballer) and Piergiorgio by his mother Margherita.

Off the pitch, Borriello has often attracted attention in the media due to his high-profile relationships; from August 2004 to December 2008, he dated Argentine–Italian showgirl Belén Rodríguez.

== Career statistics ==
=== Club ===
Appearances and goals by club, season and competition
Club	Season	League			National cup		Europe		Other		Total	
Club	Season	Division	Apps	Goals	Apps	Goals	Apps	Goals	Apps	Goals	Apps	Goals
Treviso	2000–01	Serie B	0	0	0	0	–		–		0	0
Treviso	2001–02	Serie C1	27	10	3	1	–		3 (Note: Two appearances in Serie C1 play-offs, one appearance and one goal in the Coppa Italia Serie C)	1	33	12
Treviso	Total		27	10	3	1	–		3	1	33	12
Triestina (loan)	2000–01	Serie C2	9	1	–		–		4 (Note: Appearances in Serie C2 play-offs)	1	13	2
Milan	2002–03	Serie A	3	0	2	1	1 (Note: Appearances in UEFA Champions League)	0	–		6	1
Milan	2003–04	Serie A	4	0	6	0	1	0	0	0	11	0
Milan	2006–07	Serie A	9	1	2	2	3	0	–		14	3
Milan	Total		16	1	10	3	5	0	–		31	4
Empoli (loan)	2002–03	Serie A	12	1	–		–		–		12	1
Reggina (loan)	2004–05	Serie A	30	2	2	1	–		–		32	3
Sampdoria (loan)	2005–06	Serie A	11	2	1	0	2 (Note: Appearances in UEFA Cup)	0	–		14	2
Treviso (loan)	2005–06	Serie A	20	5	–		–		–		20	5
Genoa	2007–08	Serie A	35	19	2	0	–		–		37	19
Milan	2008–09	Serie A	7	1	0	0	1	1	–		8	2
Milan	2009–10	Serie A	29	14	1	0	5	1	–		35	15
Milan	2010–11	Serie A	1	0	0	0	0	0	–		1	0
Milan	Total		37	15	1	0	6	2	–		44	17
Roma	2010–11	Serie A	34	11	4	2	8	4	–		46	17
Roma	2011–12	Serie A	7	0	0	0	1 (Note: Appearance in UEFA Europa League)	0	–		8	0
Roma	2013–14	Serie A	11	1	0	0	0	0	–		11	1
Roma	2014–15	Serie A	0	0	0	0	0	0	–		0	0
Roma	Total		52	12	4	2	9	4	–		65	18
Juventus (loan)	2011–12	Serie A	13	2	4	0	–		–		17	2
Genoa (loan)	2012–13	Serie A	28	12	0	0	–		–		28	12
West Ham (loan)	2013–14	Premier League	2	0	0	0	–		0	0	2	0
Genoa	2014–15	Serie A	8	0	0	0	–		–		8	0
Carpi	2015–16	Serie A	12	4	2	1	–		–		14	5
Atalanta	2015–16	Serie A	15	4	0	0	–		–		15	4
Cagliari	2016–17	Serie A	36	16	1	4	–		–		37	20
Cagliari	2017–18	Serie A	0	0	1	0	–		–		1	0
Cagliari	Total		36	16	2	4	–		–		38	20
SPAL	2017–18	Serie A	15	1	1	0	–		–		16	1
Ibiza	2018–19	Segunda División B	7	0	–		–		–		7	0
Career total			385	107	45	12	22	6	7	2	446	127

=== International ===
Appearances and goals by national team and year
National team	Year	Apps	Goals
Italy	2008	3	0
Italy	2010	3	0
Italy	2011	1	0
Total		7	0

== Honours ==
Milan

- Serie A: 2003–04
- UEFA Champions League: 2006–07

Juventus

- Serie A: 2011–12

Individual

- Coppa Italia top scorer: 2016–17
