= Ivan Franceschini =

Italian football coach and former player

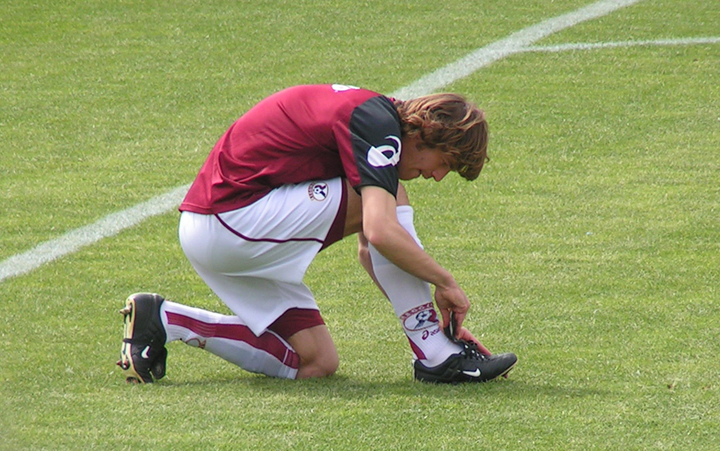
- Franceschini playing for Reggina in 2004

Personal information
- Date of birth: 7 December 1976 (age 49)
- Place of birth: Parma, Italy
- Height: 1.88 m (6 ft 2 in)
- Position: Centre-back

Youth career
- 1994–1996: Parma

Senior career*
Years	Team	Apps	(Gls)
1996–1997	Parma	0	(0)
1996–1997	→ Marseille (loan)	23	(0)
1997–1998	Salernitana	23	(1k)
1998–1999	Lucchese	28	(1)
1999–2001	Genoa	28	(0)
2000–2001	→ Chievo (loan)	11	(1)
2001–2006	Reggina	155	(5)
2006–2009	Torino	40	(3)
2009–2010	Cesena	13	(0)
2010–2011	Portogruaro	17	(0)
2011–2013	HinterReggio	55	(4)

International career
1996–1997	Italy U21	2	(0)

Managerial career
- 2014–2015: Gallico Catona
- 2015–2016: Reggina (youth)
- 2016–2017: Reggina (assistant)
- 2018–2019: Palmese
- 2019: Cittanovese 1939
- 2020: Cittanovese 1939
- 2020–2021: Castrovillari
- * Club domestic league appearances and goals

Ivan Franceschini (born 7 December 1976) is an Italian football coach and former player, who played as a defender.

== Career ==
A native of Parma, Franceschini started his career at Parma AC. In 1996–97 season, he was loaned to Olympique de Marseille in Ligue 1. In June 1997, Franceschini returned to Parma but went to Salernitana in Serie B in October. The next season, he played for Lucchese, also in Serie B. In the summer of 1999, he signed for Genoa of Serie B. In the next season he signed for Chievo in November 2000, where he won promotion to Serie A. In summer 2001, he signed for Reggina in a co-ownership deal. At Reggina, he won promotion to Serie A again, and played 4 straight season at Italian top division. In July 2006, he signed for Torino which recently promoted back to Serie A. He was the regular in the first season but dropped in the second season.

After released by Torino in June 2009, he signed a contract until end of season for Cesena in November.

After one season with Cesena, his contract was not renewed and he was without a club until 28 December 2010 when he signed a short-term deal with Portogruaro.

From 2011 until 2013 he played for HinterReggio in Serie D.

== Honours ==
Salernitana

- Serie B: 1997–98
