= Michele Mangiapelo =

Italian footballer

Personal information
- Date of birth: 30 May 1986 (age 40)
- Place of birth: Alatri, Italy
- Height: 1.84 m (6 ft 0 in)
- Position: Goalkeeper

Team information
- Current team: Pomezia

Youth career
- Sampdoria

Senior career*
Years	Team	Apps	(Gls)
2004–2007	Rieti	60	(0)
2007–2008	Narnese	14	(0)
2008–2009	Ferentino	33	(0)
2009–2010	Isola Liri	27	(0)
2010–2012	Grosseto	7	(0)
2012–2013	Cynthia	18	(0)
2013–2015	Frosinone	5	(0)
2014–2015	→ Grosseto (loan)	16	(0)
2015–2016	Lupa Roma	16	(0)
2016–	Pomezia		
- * Club domestic league appearances and goals

Michele Mangiapelo (born 30 May 1986) is an Italian footballer who plays for Pomezia.

Mangiapelo spent most of his career in Lega Pro and Serie D as well as in Lazio region of Italy.

== Biography ==
Born in Alatri, the Province of Frosinone, Lazio region, Mangiapelo started his career at Ligurian club Sampdoria. In 2004 Mangiapelo was loaned to Rieti, where he won the Group E of 2004–05 Serie D. The Lazio club signed Mangiapelo in co-ownership deal in 2005, however Mangiapelo became an understudy in 2005–06 Serie C2. Mangiapelo also received a call-up to Italy under-20 Serie C representative team. He was the backup of Riccardo Pezzato. On 20 June 2006 Sampdoria gave up the remain 50% registration rights to Rieti. Mangiapelo made 16 appearances in 2006–07 Serie C2. After the club relegated, Mangiapelo had played for 2 Serie D clubs namely Narnese and Ferentino. In 2009, he returned to the fourth division for Isola Liri, where he played 27 times in 2009–10 Lega Pro Seconda Divisione. In July 2010 he was signed by Serie B club Grosseto. Mangiapelo wore no.30 shirt in 2011–12 Serie B. He received his last first team call-up on 1 December 2011. After that match Mangiapelo played a few games for the reserve as overage player. In December 2012 he left for Serie D club Cynthia. On 13 August 2013 Mangiapelo left for Frosinone.
