= Giuseppe Colucci (footballer) =

Italian footballer

Personal information
- Date of birth: 24 August 1980 (age 46)
- Place of birth: San Giovanni Rotondo, Italy
- Height: 1.80 m (5 ft 11 in)
- Position: Central midfielder

Youth career
- –1997: Foggia

Senior career*
| Years | Team | Apps | (Gls) |
| 1997–1999 | Foggia | 39 | (1) |
| 1999–2000 | Roma | 0 | (0) |
| 1999–2000 | → Bordeaux (loan) | 2 | (0) |
| 2000–2006 | Hellas Verona | 39 | (0) |
| 2002–2003 | → Modena (loan) | 31 | (4) |
| 2003–2004 | → Brescia (loan) | 17 | (1) |
| 2004–2005 | → Reggina (loan) | 30 | (5) |
| 2005–2006 | → Livorno (loan) | 24 | (1) |
| 2006–2009 | Catania | 49 | (4) |
| 2009 | Chievo | 12 | (1) |
| 2009–2012 | Cesena | 70 | (3) |
| 2012–2013 | Pescara | 11 | (0) |
| 2013–2014 | Reggina | 26 | (1) |
| Total | | 350 | (21) |

International career
| 1996 | Italy U15 | 7 | (2) |
| 1996–1997 | Italy U16 | 10 | (5) |
| 1998 | Italy U17 | 1 | (0) |
| 1997–1999 | Italy U18 | 14 | (2) |
| 2001 | Italy U21 | 5 | (0) |

Managerial career
- 2016–2018: Foggia (general director)
- 2019–2021: Empoli (scout)
- 2021–2024: Empoli (head of scouting)
- 2024–205: Sampdoria (head of scouting)
Medal record
Men's Football
Representing Italy
UEFA European Under-18 Championship
| Second place | 1999 Switzerland |
- * Club domestic league appearances and goals

Giuseppe Colucci (born 24 August 1980) is an Italian former professional footballer who played as a central midfielder.

== Club career ==
=== Early career ===
Colucci started his professional career with Foggia, where he made 39 league appearances, accompanied by a single goal in two seasons with the club. After a successful spell with the Foggia, he was transferred to Serie A side Roma. He spent his time on loan at Bordeaux. He played twice for Bordeaux at 1999–2000 UEFA Champions League in March 2000, verse Valencia CF and AC Fiorentina, as second-half substitute.

=== Verona ===
In 2000, he was sold to Verona (in direct exchange deal with Alberto Maria Fontana), where he made 38 league appearances in two seasons. He then loaned to various Serie A clubs: Modena, Brescia, Reggina and Livorno, where he played more regularly at Modena and Reggina.

=== Catania ===
In August 2006, Colucci was signed by Catania on a co-ownership deal, and later extended the deal by signing a three-year deal. Colucci made 23 and 19 starts respectively in the first two seasons. In his third season, he was not made part of the club's future by new coach Walter Zenga and failed to make an appearance that year.

=== Chievo and Cesena ===
On 2 February 2009, team-mate Gennaro Sardo and Colucci was transferred to Chievo in six-month loan and six-month contract respectively. Colucci was offered a new contract but failed to reach an agreement with Chievo.

In December 2009, he signed a contract with Cesena. He signed a new contract after Cesena remained at Serie A, extended the contract from 30 June 2012 to 30 June 2013.

=== Pescara ===
Following Cesena's relegation to Serie B, Colucci was presented on 13 July 2012 by newly promoted Serie A side Pescara as their first two acquisitions of the off-season alongside Elvis Abbruscato.

=== Reggina ===
On 22 January 2013, he was bought by Reggina. At the same time Giuseppe Rizzo was loaned to Pescara.

== International career ==
Colucci has been capped five times for Italy U21 and played at 2002 UEFA European Under-21 Football Championship qualifying. He also played for Italy U18 team that lost to Portugal U18 team at UEFA European Under-18 Football Championship.

== Honours ==
=== Player ===
Italy U18

- UEFA European Under-18 Championship runner-up: 1999
