= Pietro Arnulfo =

Italian footballer

Personal information
- Date of birth: 13 September 1988 (age 38)
- Place of birth: Genoa, Italy
- Height: 1.80 m (5 ft 11 in)
- Position: Striker

Youth career
- Sampdoria

Senior career*
Years	Team	Apps	(Gls)
2007–2009	Sampdoria	1	(0)
2008–2009	→ Cuoiocappiano (loan)	28	(2)
2009–2010	Figline	?	(?)
- * Club domestic league appearances and goals

Pietro Arnulfo (born 13 September 1988 in Genoa) is an Italian footballer who plays for Figline.

He moved his first football footsteps into Sampdoria's youth ranks, and made his Serie A debut as a substitute against Calcio Catania on 20 May 2007, which is also his only first team appearance so far.

In July 2008 Sampdoria confirmed to have loaned him out to Serie C2 team Cuoiocappiano.
