= Gionata Mingozzi =

Italian footballer

Personal information
- Date of birth: 29 December 1984
- Place of birth: Ravenna, Italy
- Date of death: 15 July 2008 (aged 23)
- Place of death: Campagna Lupia, Italy
- Height: 1.77 m (5 ft 10 in)
- Position: Midfielder

Senior career*
Years	Team	Apps	(Gls)
2001–2004	Ravenna	77	(2)
2004–2005	Perugia	14	(0)
2005–2007	Sampdoria	2	(0)
2006–2007	→ Lecce (loan)	8	(0)
2007–2008	Treviso	17	(0)
- * Club domestic league appearances and goals as of 2008-07-15

Gionata Mingozzi (29 December 1984 – 15 July 2008) was an Italian footballer. He last played for Treviso in Serie B.

== Career ==
Mingozzi started his career at Ravenna. He followed the team promoted from Eccellenza to Serie C2 within 2 years. He was signed by Perugia in summer 2004.

In summer 2005, he was signed by Sampdoria and made his Serie A debut on 26 February 2006 against Siena.

He was successively loaned to Lecce, and sold half of contractual rights to Treviso in summer 2007.

Mingozzi died in a car accident when his Porsche hit directly a lorry in Campagna Lupia on 15 July 2008.
