= 2002–03 UC Sampdoria season =

Sampdoria
2002–03 season
- Chairman: Riccardo Garrone
- Manager: Walter Novellino
- Serie B: 2nd (promoted)
- Coppa Italia: Round of 16
- Top goalscorer: Fabio Bazzani (16)

In the 2002-03 season, UC Sampdoria competed in Serie B for a fourth season. They finished the year second behind Siena and were promoted back to Serie A.

== Players ==
=== First-team squad ===
Squad at end of season Note: Flags indicate national team as defined under FIFA eligibility rules; some limited exceptions apply. Players may hold more than one non-FIFA nationality.

No.	Pos.	Nation	Player
1	GK	ITA	Luigi Turci
3	DF	ITA	Stefano Bettarini
4	MF	ITA	Sergio Volpi
5	DF	ITA	Maurizio Domizzi
6	MF	COL	Jorge Bolaño (on loan from Parma)
7	FW	ITA	Andrea Rabito (on loan from A.C. Milan)
8	FW	ITA	Corrado Colombo
9	FW	ITA	Fabio Bazzani
10	FW	ITA	Francesco Flachi
12	GK	ITA	Davide Pinato
14	DF	ITA	Mirko Conte
15	MF	CMR	Francis Zé
16	GK	ITA	Fabrizio Casazza
17	MF	ITA	Angelo Palombo
18	DF	SCG	Bratislav Živković

No.	Pos.	Nation	Player
19	DF	ITA	Massimo Paganin
20	DF	ITA	Alessandro Grandoni
21	MF	FRA	Sid-Ahmed Bouziane
22	FW	NGA	Ikechukwu Kalu
23	MF	ITA	Andrea Bernini
24	FW	ITA	Daniele Perrone
25	DF	SCG	Nenad Sakić
26	MF	ITA	Francesco Pedone
33	DF	ITA	Claudio Labriola
65	MF	ITA	Salvatore Miceli (on loan from Piacenza)
72	DF	ITA	Stefano Sacchetti
77	FW	ITA	Andrea Gasbarroni
83	DF	ITA	Mattia Cassani (on loan from Juventus)
84	GK	ITA	Olmo Pozzo
97	MF	ITA	Fabian Valtolina

=== Left club during season ===
Note: Flags indicate national team as defined under FIFA eligibility rules; some limited exceptions apply. Players may hold more than one non-FIFA nationality.

No.	Pos.	Nation	Player
2	DF	ITA	Guglielmo Stendardo (to Salernitana)
11	MF	ITA	Vincenzo Iacopino (on loan to Catania)

No.	Pos.	Nation	Player
21	MF	ITA	Sandro Cois (on loan to Piacenza)

== Competitions ==
=== Serie B ===
==== League table ====
Pos	Team	Pld	W	D	L	GF	GA	GD	Pts	Promotion or relegation
1	Siena (P, C)	38	17	16	5	46	26	+20	67	Promotion to Serie A
2	Sampdoria (P)	38	17	16	5	53	31	+22	67	Promotion to Serie A
3	Lecce (P)	38	15	18	5	46	33	+13	63	Promotion to Serie A
4	Ancona (P)	38	16	13	9	53	40	+13	61	Promotion to Serie A
5	Triestina	38	16	10	12	54	46	+8	58	

Source: Almanacco Illustrato del Calcio - La Storia 1898-2004, Panini Edizioni, Modena, September 2005
Rules for classification: 1) points; 2) head-to-head points; 3) head-to-head goal difference; 4) head-to-head goals scored; 5) goal difference; 6) number of goals scored.
(C) Champions; (P) Promoted

==== Results summary ====
Overall								Home						Away					
Pld	W	D	L	GF	GA	GD	Pts	W	D	L	GF	GA	GD	W	D	L	GF	GA	GD
38	17	16	5	53	31	+22	67	13	5	1	33	13	+20	4	11	4	20	18	+2

Last updated: 7 June 2004.
Source: Competitive matches

==== Results by round ====
Round	1	2	3	4	5	6	7	8	9	10	11	12	13	14	15	16	17	18	19	20	21	22	23	24	25	26	27	28	29	30	31	32	33	34	35	36	37	38
Ground	H	A	H	A	H	A	H	A	A	H	A	H	A	H	H	A	H	A	H	A	H	A	H	A	H	A	H	H	A	H	A	H	A	A	H	A	H	A
Result	W	D	W	D	W	D	W	D	D	D	W	W	L	D	L	L	W	D	W	D	W	L	W	W	W	D	W	D	D	W	W	D	W	D	W	D	D	W
Position	2	4	1	2	1	2	2	4	2	1	1	1	1	2	6	4	5	4	2	2	1	4	3	1	1	1	1	1	2	1	1	1	1	1	1	1	1	2

Updated to match(es) played on 7 June 2003. Source: Competitive matches
A = Away; H = Home; W = Win; D = Draw; L = Loss

==== Matches ====
14 September 2002 3	Sampdoria	4–2	Lecce	Genoa
	Gasbarroni 45+2', 90+2'; Bazzani 71'; Volpi 76'		Vugrinec 11'; Chevantón 61'	Stadium: Stadio Luigi Ferraris; Referee: Nicola Rizzoli

21 September 2002 4	Ascoli	0–0	Sampdoria	Ascoli Piceno
				Stadium: Stadio Cino e Lillo Del Duca; Referee: Oscar Girardi

28 September 2002 5	Sampdoria	2–1	Cosenza	Genoa
	Bazzani 54', 58'		Alteri 90'	Stadium: Stadio Luigi Ferraris; Referee: Emidio Morganti

5 October 2002 6	Napoli	1–1	Sampdoria	Naples
	Montezine 59'		Volpi 35'	Stadium: Stadio San Paolo; Referee: Stefano Farina

12 October 2002 7	Sampdoria	1–0	Catania	Genoa
	Volpi 78' (pen.)			Stadium: Stadio Luigi Ferraris; Referee: Oscar Girardi

19 October 2002 8	Ancona	1–1	Sampdoria	Ancona
	Magoni 36'		Bazzani 14'	Stadium: Stadio del Conero; Referee: Nicola Rizzoli

26 October 2002 9	Bari	1–1	Sampdoria	Bari
	Anaclerio 20'		Bazzani 90+3'	Stadium: Stadio San Nicola; Referee: Stefano Cassarà

2 November 2002 10	Sampdoria	1–1	Triestina	Genoa
	Domizzi 41'		Parisi 36' (pen.)	Stadium: Stadio Luigi Ferraris; Referee: Luca Palanca

7 November 2002 1	Sampdoria	2–0	Livorno	Genoa
	Flachi 43' (pen.); Valtolina 85'			Stadium: Stadio Luigi Ferraris; Referee: Fiorenzo Treossi

10 November 2002 11	Salernitana	0–1	Sampdoria	Salerno
			Flachi 14' (pen.)	Stadium: Stadio Arechi; Referee: Massimiliano Saccani

15 November 2002 12	Sampdoria	2–1	Genoa	Genoa
	Bazzani 14'; Flachi 33'		D'Isanto 75'	Stadium: Stadio Luigi Ferraris; Referee: Pasquale Rodomonti

24 November 2002 13	Siena	1–0	Sampdoria	Siena
	Tiribocchi 69'			Stadium: Stadio Artemio Franchi; Referee: Emilio Pellegrino

1 December 2002 14	Sampdoria	0–0	Vicenza	Genoa
				Stadium: Stadio Luigi Ferraris; Referee: Alberto Castellani

8 December 2002 15	Sampdoria	1–2	Ternana	Genoa
	Bazzani 3'		Frick 17', 82'	Stadium: Stadio Luigi Ferraris; Referee: Emidio Morganti

13 December 2002 16	Cagliari	1–0	Sampdoria	Sassari
	Capone 90+6'			Stadium: Stadio Nino Manconi; Referee: Alberto Castellani

22 December 2002 17	Sampdoria	3–2	Hellas Verona	Genoa
	Volpi 4'; Bettarini 29'; Flachi 31' (pen.)		Cassetti 62', 74'	Stadium: Stadio Luigi Ferraris; Referee: Michele Cruciani

6 January 2003 2	Palermo	0–0	Sampdoria	Palermo
				Stadium: Stadio Renzo Barbera; Referee: Domenico Messina

12 January 2003 18	Messina	3–3	Sampdoria	Messina
	Domizzi 3' (o.g.), 27' (o.g.); Campolo 58'		Valtolina 15'; Palombo 32'; Bazzani 75'	Stadium: Stadio Giovanni Celeste; Referee: Massimiliano Saccani

17 January 2003 19	Sampdoria	4–0	Venezia	Genoa
	Valtolina 21'; Pedone 60'; Volpi 79' (pen.); Živković 90+1'			Stadium: Stadio Luigi Ferraris; Referee: Danilo Nucini

25 January 2003 20	Livorno	1–1	Sampdoria	Livorno
	Protti 67'		Bazzani 55'	Stadium: Stadio Armando Picchi; Referee: Daniele Tombolini

1 February 2003 21	Sampdoria	1–0	Palermo	Genoa
	Conteh 7' (o.g.)			Stadium: Stadio Luigi Ferraris; Referee: Diego Preschern

10 February 2003 22	Lecce	1–0	Sampdoria	Lecce
	Vučinić 58'			Stadium: Stadio Via del Mare; Referee: Massimiliano Saccani

22 February 2003 23	Sampdoria	3–0	Ascoli	Genoa
	Bettarini 17'; Colombo 22'; Bazzani 57'			Stadium: Stadio Luigi Ferraris; Referee: Pasquale Rodomonti

1 March 2003 24	Cosenza	1–3	Sampdoria	Cosenza
	Agomeri 10'		Flachi 55'; Bazzani 62'; Volpi 66'	Stadium: Stadio San Vito; Referee: Oscar Girardi

10 March 2003 25	Sampdoria	2–0	Napoli	Genoa
	Bazzani 20'; Flachi 70'			Stadium: Stadio Luigi Ferraris; Referee: Alberto Castellani

15 March 2003 26	Catania	0–0	Sampdoria	Catania
				Stadium: Stadio Angelo Massimino; Referee: Nicola Ayroldi

22 March 2003 27	Sampdoria	2–1	Ancona	Genoa
	Flachi 27' (pen.); Conte 55'		Budan 79'	Stadium: Stadio Luigi Ferraris; Referee: Luca Palanca

29 March 2003 28	Sampdoria	1–1	Bari	Genoa
	Bazzani 36'		Spinesi 43'	Stadium: Stadio Luigi Ferraris; Referee: Roberto Rosetti

7 April 2003 29	Triestina	2–2	Sampdoria	Trieste
	Passaro 24'; Parisi 36'		Bazzani 48'; Volpi 66'	Stadium: Stadio Nereo Rocco; Referee: Salvatore Racalbuto

12 April 2003 30	Sampdoria	1–0	Salernitana	Genoa
	Volpi 9'			Stadium: Stadio Luigi Ferraris; Referee: Luca Palanca

19 April 2003 31	Genoa	0–2	Sampdoria	Genoa
			Živković 9'; Conte 45+1'	Stadium: Stadio Luigi Ferraris; Referee: Roberto Rosetti

28 April 2003 32	Sampdoria	0–0	Siena	Genoa
				Stadium: Stadio Luigi Ferraris; Referee: Daniele Tombolini

3 May 2003 33	Vicenza	1–2	Sampdoria	Vicenza
	Schwoch 51' (pen.)		Bazzani 13'; Pedone 52'	Stadium: Stadio Romeo Menti; Referee: Cosimo Bolognino

12 May 2003 34	Ternana	1–1	Sampdoria	Terni
	Zaniolo 72'		Colombo 48'	Stadium: Stadio Libero Liberati; Referee: Diego Preschern

17 May 2003 35	Sampdoria	3–1	Cagliari	Genoa
	Flachi 17', 45+2'; Bazzani 84'		Suazo 60'	Stadium: Stadio Luigi Ferraris; Referee: Stefano Farina

24 May 2003 36	Hellas Verona	0–0	Sampdoria	Verona
				Stadium: Stadio Marcantonio Bentegodi; Referee: Danilo Nucini

31 May 2003 37	Sampdoria	1–1	Messina	Genoa
	Colombo 76'		Sullo 29' (pen.)	Stadium: Stadio Luigi Ferraris; Referee: Luca Palanca

7 June 2003 38	Venezia	3–1	Sampdoria	Venice
	Soligo 14'; Marcón 50'; Poggi 69' (pen.)		Rabito 89'	Stadium: Stadio Pier Luigi Penzo; Referee: Pasquale Rodomonti

=== Coppa Italia ===
==== Group stage (Group 1) ====
Pos	Team	Pld	W	D	L	GF	GA	GD	Pts
1	Sampdoria (B)	3	2	1	0	6	2	+4	7
2	Genoa (B)	3	1	1	1	4	4	0	4
3	Lucchese (C)	3	0	2	1	3	4	−1	2
4	Siena (B)	3	0	2	1	2	5	−3	2

18 August 2002 1	Sampdoria	3–0	Siena	Genoa
20:45 CEST	Volpi 29'; Flachi 34'; Pedone 76'			Stadium: Stadio Luigi Ferraris; Attendance: 7,595; Referee: Pierluigi Collina

25 August 2002 2	Genoa	1–2	Sampdoria	Genoa
20:45 CEST	De Francesco 12'		Flachi 3'; Bazzani 59'	Stadium: Stadio Luigi Ferraris; Attendance: 30,000; Referee: Cosimo Bolognino

11 September 2002 3	Lucchese	1–1	Sampdoria	Lucca
20:30 CEST	Carruezzo 28' (pen.)		Iacopino 14'	Stadium: Stadio Porta Elisa; Attendance: 1,526; Referee: Matteo Trefoloni

==== Round of 32 ====
25 September 2002 First leg	Sampdoria	1–0	Atalanta	Genoa
18:00 CEST	Colombo 62'			Stadium: Stadio Luigi Ferraris; Attendance: 3,981; Referee: Roberto Rosetti

10 October 2002 Second leg	Atalanta	1–1 (1–2 agg.)	Sampdoria	Bergamo
15:30 CEST	Comandini 53'		Iacopino 14' (pen.)	Stadium: Stadio Atleti Azzurri d'Italia; Attendance: 2,500; Referee: Emidio Morganti

==== Round of 16 ====
3 December 2002 First leg	Sampdoria	1–1	Perugia	Genoa
21:00 CET	Flachi 67' (pen.)		Miccoli 39'	Stadium: Stadio Luigi Ferraris; Attendance: 3,479; Referee: Matteo Trefoloni

19 December 2002 Second leg	Perugia	2–0 (3–1 agg.)	Sampdoria	Perugia
21:00 CET	Vryzas 44'; Miccoli 89'			Stadium: Stadio Renato Curi; Attendance: 2,000; Referee: Danilo Nucini
