= 2003–04 UC Sampdoria season =

Sampdoria
2003–04 season
- Chairman: Riccardo Garrone
- Manager: Walter Novellino
- Serie A: 8th
- Coppa Italia: Round of 16
- Top goalscorer: Fabio Bazzani (13)

UC Sampdoria returned to Serie A after a four year-absence, and immediately re-established itself as a team on the top half of the domestic championship. Goalkeeper Francesco Antonioli offered crucial experience, but apart from him did the bulk of the squad play in the 2002-03 Serie B, with top goalscorers Fabio Bazzani and Francesco Flachi quickly adjusting themselves to the higher pace of Serie A. Midfielders Sergio Volpi and Angelo Palombo also stood out. Right back Aimo Diana even earned a call-up to the national team following his performances.

== Players ==
=== First-team squad ===
Squad at end of season Note: Flags indicate national team as defined under FIFA eligibility rules; some limited exceptions apply. Players may hold more than one non-FIFA nationality.

No.	Pos.	Nation	Player
1	GK	ITA	Luigi Turci
3	DF	ITA	Stefano Bettarini
4	MF	ITA	Sergio Volpi
5	DF	ITA	Moris Carrozzieri
7	FW	ITA	Giacomo Cipriani (on loan from Bologna)
9	FW	ITA	Fabio Bazzani
10	FW	ITA	Francesco Flachi
13	FW	JPN	Atsushi Yanagisawa
14	DF	ITA	Mirko Conte
15	MF	CMR	Francis Zé
17	MF	ITA	Angelo Palombo
18	DF	SCG	Bratislav Živković
19	DF	ITA	Giulio Falcone
20	MF	ITA	Biagio Pagano
21	GK	ITA	Francesco Antonioli

No.	Pos.	Nation	Player
22	GK	ITA	Emanuele Bianchi
23	DF	ITA	Aimo Diana
24	FW	ITA	Antonio Floro Flores (on loan from Napoli)
25	DF	SCG	Nenad Sakić
26	MF	ITA	Francesco Pedone
27	MF	ITA	Cristiano Doni
28	MF	CMR	Thomas Job
29	MF	ITA	Massimo Donati (on loan from AC Milan)
30	MF	ITA	Claudio Costanzo
31	MF	ITA	Giampaolo Calzi=on loan from Castellettese
72	DF	ITA	Stefano Sacchetti
77	DF	ITA	Cristian Zenoni (on loan from Juventus)
82	DF	ITA	Luca Antonini
85	FW	ITA	Francesco Virdis
97	MF	ITA	Fabian Valtolina

=== Left club during season ===
Note: Flags indicate national team as defined under FIFA eligibility rules; some limited exceptions apply. Players may hold more than one non-FIFA nationality.

No.	Pos.	Nation	Player
7	DF	ITA	Maurizio Domizzi (on loan to Modena)
8	FW	ITA	Corrado Colombo (on loan to Piacenza)

No.	Pos.	Nation	Player
11	FW	ITA	Massimo Marazzina (on loan from Chievo)
20	DF	ITA	Alessandro Grandoni (to Modena)

== Competitions ==
=== Serie A ===
==== League table ====
Pos	Team	Pld	W	D	L	GF	GA	GD	Pts	Qualification or relegation
6	Lazio	34	16	8	10	52	38	+14	56	Qualification to UEFA Cup first round
7	Udinese (Note: Udinese gained entry to the 2004–05 UEFA Cup as Coppa Italia because both finalists Lazio and Juventus qualified for the 2004–05 UEFA Cup and the 2004–05 UEFA Champions League through league position, respectively.)	34	13	11	10	44	40	+4	50	Qualification to UEFA Cup first round
8	Sampdoria	34	11	13	10	40	42	−2	46	
9	Chievo	34	11	11	12	36	37	−1	44	
10	Lecce	34	11	8	15	43	56	−13	41	

Source: Almanacco Illustrato del Calcio – La Storia 1898-2004, Panini Edizioni, Modena, September 2005
Rules for classification: 1) points; 2) tiebreaker for relevant positions 3) head-to-head points and goal difference; 4) head-to-head goals scored; 5) goal difference; 6) number of goals scored.

==== Results summary ====
Overall								Home						Away					
Pld	W	D	L	GF	GA	GD	Pts	W	D	L	GF	GA	GD	W	D	L	GF	GA	GD
34	11	13	10	40	42	−2	46	9	4	4	26	23	+3	2	9	6	14	19	−5

Last updated: 16 May 2004.
Source: Competitive matches

==== Results by round ====
Round	1	2	3	4	5	6	7	8	9	10	11	12	13	14	15	16	17	18	19	20	21	22	23	24	25	26	27	28	29	30	31	32	33	34
Ground	A	H	A	H	A	A	H	A	H	A	H	H	A	H	A	H	A	H	A	H	A	H	H	A	H	A	H	A	A	H	A	H	A	H
Result	D	L	D	W	L	D	L	W	W	D	W	W	D	D	W	L	L	W	D	D	D	L	W	L	W	D	D	W	D	W	L	L	L	D
Position	6	10	13	9	11	12	12	11	9	9	7	7	8	8	7	8	8	7	8	8	8	8	8	8	8	8	8	8	8	7	8	8	8	8

Updated to match(es) played on 16 May 2004. Source: Competitive matches
A = Away; H = Home; W = Win; D = Draw; L = Loss

==== Matches ====
30 August 2003 1	Reggina	2–2	Sampdoria	Reggio Calabria
18:00 CEST	Cozza 5'; Di Michele 41'		Bazzani 64'; Diana 73'	Stadium: Stadio Oreste Granillo; Attendance: 21,531; Referee: Massimo De Santis

13 September 2003 2	Sampdoria	1–2	Lazio	Genoa
18:00 CEST	Bazzani 73'		S. Inzaghi 8'; Albertini 64' (pen.)	Stadium: Stadio Luigi Ferraris; Attendance: 28,500; Referee: Domenico Messina

21 September 2003 3	Internazionale	0–0	Sampdoria	Milan
15:00 CEST				Stadium: San Siro; Attendance: 60,000; Referee: Pierluigi Collina

28 September 2003 4	Sampdoria	2–1	Brescia	Genoa
15:00 CEST	Bazzani 88'; Flachi 90' (pen.)		Mauri 69'	Stadium: Stadio Luigi Ferraris; Attendance: 24,461; Referee: Massimiliano Saccani

5 October 2003 5	Parma	1–0	Sampdoria	Parma
15:00 CEST	Adriano 19'			Stadium: Stadio Ennio Tardini; Attendance: 18,000; Referee: Stefano Cassarà

19 October 2003 6	Chievo	1–1	Sampdoria	Verona
15:00 CEST	Amauri 24'		Diana 60'	Stadium: Stadio Marcantonio Bentegodi; Attendance: 13,890; Referee: Matteo Trefoloni

26 October 2003 7	Sampdoria	0–3	Milan	Genoa
15:00 CET			Tomasson 38'; Shevchenko 59', 90+2'	Stadium: Stadio Luigi Ferraris; Attendance: 35,000; Referee: Roberto Rosetti

2 November 2003 8	Bologna	0–1	Sampdoria	Bologna
15:00 CET			Doni 33'	Stadium: Stadio Renato Dall'Ara; Attendance: 22,000; Referee: Stefano Farina

8 November 2003 9	Sampdoria	2–0	Empoli	Genoa
15:00 CET	Bazzani 22'; Doni 27'			Stadium: Stadio Luigi Ferraris; Attendance: 25,000; Referee: Paolo Dondarini

23 November 2003 10	Lecce	0–0	Sampdoria	Lecce
15:00 CET				Stadium: Stadio Via del Mare; Attendance: 13,760; Referee: Nicola Rizzoli

30 November 2003 11	Sampdoria	2–0	Ancona	Genoa
15:00 CET	Bazzani 66'; Flachi 89'			Stadium: Stadio Luigi Ferraris; Attendance: 22,259; Referee: Stefano Cassarà

7 December 2003 12	Sampdoria	2–1	Siena	Genoa
15:00 CET	Flachi 1'; Bazzani 73'		D'Aversa 39'	Stadium: Stadio Luigi Ferraris; Attendance: 24,353; Referee: Christian Brighi

13 December 2003 13	Perugia	3–3	Sampdoria	Perugia
20:30 CET	Ignoffo 39'; Margiotta 55'; Gio. Tedesco 58'		Flachi 16', 89'; Tardioli 60' (o.g.)	Stadium: Stadio Renato Curi; Attendance: 23,060; Referee: Pasquale Rodomonti

21 December 2003 14	Sampdoria	1–1	Modena	Genoa
15:00 CET	Bazzani 50'		Kamara 22'	Stadium: Stadio Luigi Ferraris; Attendance: 24,085; Referee: Pierluigi Collina

6 January 2004 15	Udinese	0–1	Sampdoria	Udine
15:00 CET			Flachi 57'	Stadium: Stadio Friuli; Attendance: 16,589; Referee: Nicola Ayroldi

11 January 2004 16	Sampdoria	1–2	Juventus	Genoa
15:00 CET	Flachi 56'		Camoranesi 24'; A. Conte 74'	Stadium: Stadio Luigi Ferraris; Attendance: 36,703; Referee: Matteo Trefoloni

18 January 2004 17	Roma	3–1	Sampdoria	Rome
15:00 CET	Carew 10'; Totti 60', 67'		Bazzani 6'	Stadium: Stadio Olimpico; Attendance: 49,000; Referee: Nicola Ayroldi

24 January 2004 18	Sampdoria	2–0	Reggina	Genoa
20:30 CET	Bazzani 45', 47'			Stadium: Stadio Luigi Ferraris; Attendance: 23,280; Referee: Stefano Cassarà

1 February 2004 19	Lazio	1–1	Sampdoria	Rome
15:00 CET	Fiore 10'		Bazzani 85'	Stadium: Stadio Olimpico; Attendance: 46,243; Referee: Massimiliano Saccani

8 February 2004 20	Sampdoria	2–2	Internazionale	Genoa
15:00 CET	Cipriani 57'; Doni 86' (pen.)		C. Vieri 31', 78'	Stadium: Stadio Luigi Ferraris; Attendance: 35,706; Referee: Gianluca Paparesta

15 February 2004 21	Brescia	1–1	Sampdoria	Brescia
15:00 CET	A. Caracciolo 6'		Doni 57'	Stadium: Stadio Mario Rigamonti; Attendance: 14,577; Referee: Marco Gabriele

21 February 2004 22	Sampdoria	1–2	Parma	Genoa
18:00 CET	Floro Flores 82'		Gilardino 59'; Bresciano 74'	Stadium: Stadio Luigi Ferraris; Attendance: 23,436; Referee: Stefano Farina

29 February 2004 23	Sampdoria	1–0	Chievo	Genoa
15:00 CET	Diana 50'			Stadium: Stadio Luigi Ferraris; Attendance: 22,408; Referee: Cosimo Bolognino

7 March 2004 24	Milan	3–1	Sampdoria	Milan
15:00 CET	Pirlo 17'; F. Inzaghi 35'; Kaká 49'		Doni 27'	Stadium: San Siro; Attendance: 64,967; Referee: Matteo Trefoloni

14 March 2004 25	Sampdoria	3–2	Bologna	Genoa
15:00 CET	Volpi 9' (pen.); Diana 28'; Cipriani 50'		Signori 10'; Nervo 69'	Stadium: Stadio Luigi Ferraris; Attendance: 23,522; Referee: Marco Gabriele

21 March 2004 26	Empoli	1–1	Sampdoria	Empoli
15:00 CET	Rocchi 90+2'		Belleri 18' (o.g.)	Stadium: Stadio Carlo Castellani; Attendance: 7,607; Referee: Pierluigi Collina

28 March 2004 27	Sampdoria	2–2	Lecce	Genoa
15:00 CEST	Flachi 8', 42'		Chevanton 37' (pen.); Konan 90+1'	Stadium: Stadio Luigi Ferraris; Attendance: 22,852; Referee: Marco Gabriele

4 April 2004 28	Ancona	0–1	Sampdoria	Ancona
15:00 CEST			Bazzani 19'	Stadium: Stadio del Conero; Attendance: 10,199; Referee: Diego Preschern

10 April 2004 29	Siena	0–0	Sampdoria	Siena
15:00 CEST				Stadium: Stadio Artemio Franchi; Attendance: 11,623; Referee: Antonio Dattilo

18 April 2004 30	Sampdoria	3–2	Perugia	Genoa
15:00 CEST	Diana 39'; Flachi 45', 87'		Zé Maria 47'; Ravanelli 85'	Stadium: Stadio Luigi Ferraris; Attendance: 23,060; Referee: Cosimo Bolognino

25 April 2004 31	Modena	1–0	Sampdoria	Modena
15:00 CEST	Kamara 59'			Stadium: Stadio Alberto Braglia; Attendance: 17,031; Referee: Massimiliano Saccani

2 May 2004 32	Sampdoria	1–3	Udinese	Genoa
15:00 CEST	Bazzani 51'		Jankulovski 28'; Pizarro 58' (pen.); Iaquinta 87'	Stadium: Stadio Luigi Ferraris; Attendance: 28,000; Referee: Luca Palanca

9 May 2004 33	Juventus	2–0	Sampdoria	Turin
15:00 CEST	Legrottaglie 37'; Appiah 44'			Stadium: Stadio Delle Alpi; Attendance: 31,866; Referee: Emidio Morganti

16 May 2004 34	Sampdoria	0–0	Roma	Genoa
15:00 CEST				Stadium: Stadio Luigi Ferraris; Attendance: 26,000; Referee: Alberto Castellani

==== Topscorers ====
- (Italy) Fabio Bazzani 13
- (Italy) Francesco Flachi 11
- (Italy) Cristiano Doni 6
- (Italy) Aimo Diana 5

=== Coppa Italia ===
==== Second round ====
1 October 2003 First leg	Pro Patria	0–1	Sampdoria	Busto Arsizio
20:45 CEST			Antonini 27'	Stadium: Stadio Carlo Speroni; Attendance: 3,500; Referee: Oscar Girardi

29 October 2003 Second leg	Sampdoria	3–0 (4–0 agg.)	Pro Patria	Genoa
20:30 CET	Marazzina 6'; Doni 10'; Zenoni 78'			Stadium: Stadio Luigi Ferraris; Attendance: 7,500; Referee: Danilo Nucini

==== Round of 16 ====
3 December 2003 First leg	Sampdoria	0–1	Milan	Genoa
21:10 CET			M. Conte 79' (o.g.)	Stadium: Stadio Luigi Ferraris; Attendance: 10,000; Referee: Paolo Dondarini

18 December 2003 Second leg	Milan	1–0 (2–0 agg.)	Sampdoria	Milan
20:45 CET	F. Inzaghi 13'			Stadium: San Siro; Attendance: 2,742; Referee: Antonio Dattilo
