= 2006–07 UC Sampdoria season =

Sampdoria
2006–07 season
- Chairman: Riccardo Garrone
- Manager: Walter Novellino
- Serie A: 9th
- Coppa Italia: Semi-finals
- Top goalscorer: League: Fabio Quagliarella (13); All: Fabio Quagliarella (14)

During the 2006–07 Italian football season, Sampdoria competed in Serie A.

== Season summary ==
Sampdoria finished 9th, which was sufficient to qualify for the Intertoto Cup. Manager Walter Novellino left at the end of the season to join Torino, and was replaced by Reggina coach Walter Mazzarri.

== Kit ==
Sampdoria's kit was manufactured by Kappa and sponsored by Genovese energy company Erg.

== First-team squad ==
Squad at end of season

Note: Flags indicate national team as defined under FIFA eligibility rules; some limited exceptions apply. Players may hold more than one non-FIFA nationality.

No.	Pos.	Nation	Player
1	GK	ITA	Luca Castellazzi
2	DF	ITA	Simone Ciancio
3	DF	SUI	Reto Ziegler (on loan from Tottenham Hotspur)
4	MF	ITA	Sergio Volpi
5	DF	ITA	Pietro Accardi
6	MF	HUN	Vladimir Koman
7	DF	ITA	Christian Maggio
8	MF	URU	Rubén Olivera (on loan from Juventus)
9	FW	ITA	Fabio Bazzani
10	FW	ITA	Francesco Flachi
11	FW	LBY	Al-Saadi Gaddafi
12	GK	ITA	Vincenzo Fiorillo
14	DF	ITA	Luigi Sala
15	GK	ITA	Carlo Zotti (on loan from Roma)
16	MF	ITA	Danilo Soddimo
17	MF	ITA	Angelo Palombo
18	MF	ITA	Andrea Parola
19	DF	ITA	Giulio Falcone
20	FW	ITA	Emiliano Bonazzoli
21	MF	ITA	Daniele Franceschini

No.	Pos.	Nation	Player
22	GK	ITA	Gianluca Di Gennaro
23	DF	ITA	Christian Terlizzi
25	FW	USA	Gabriel Ferrari
26	DF	SRB	Ivan Živanović
27	FW	ITA	Fabio Quagliarella
31	DF	CMR	Solomon Enow
33	DF	ITA	Alessandro Bastrini
40	MF	ITA	Gennaro Delvecchio
46	DF	ITA	Mirko Pieri
50	FW	ITA	Pietro Arnulfo
52	DF	ITA	Nicola Donato
53	DF	ITA	Matteo Lanzoni
54	DF	ITA	Luca Calzolaio
55	FW	ITA	Alessandro Romeo
56	MF	ITA	Carmine Cucciniello
66	MF	SUI	Bruno Mota
77	DF	ITA	Cristian Zenoni
87	MF	ITA	Paolo Castellazzi
99	GK	ITA	Gianluca Berti

=== Left club during season ===
Note: Flags indicate national team as defined under FIFA eligibility rules; some limited exceptions apply. Players may hold more than one non-FIFA nationality.

No.	Pos.	Nation	Player
11	MF	ITA	Massimo Bonanni (on loan to Ascoli)
88	FW	ITA	Salvatore Foti (on loan to Vicenza)

No.	Pos.	Nation	Player
—	GK	ITA	Daniele Padelli (on loan to Liverpool)
—	FW	ITA	Corrado Colombo (to Spezia)

== Competitions ==
=== Serie A ===
==== League table ====
Pos	Team	Pld	W	D	L	GF	GA	GD	Pts	Qualification or relegation
7	Empoli	38	14	12	12	42	43	−1	54	Qualification to UEFA Cup first round
8	Atalanta	38	12	14	12	56	54	+2	50	
9	Sampdoria	38	13	10	15	44	48	−4	49	Qualification to Intertoto Cup third round (Note: Sampdoria gained entry to the 2007 UEFA Intertoto Cup after Atalanta renounced. Sampdoria then qualified for the 2007–08 UEFA Cup first round.)
10	Udinese	38	12	10	16	49	55	−6	46	
11	Livorno	38	10	13	15	41	54	−13	43	

Source: "Serie A 2006/2007 - 38. Round". worldfootball.net. 21 July 2025.
Rules for classification: 1) points; 2) goal difference; 3) number of goals scored.

==== Results summary ====
Overall								Home						Away					
Pld	W	D	L	GF	GA	GD	Pts	W	D	L	GF	GA	GD	W	D	L	GF	GA	GD
38	13	10	15	44	48	−4	49	9	7	3	30	19	+11	4	3	12	14	29	−15

Last updated: 27 May 2007.
Source: Competitive matches

==== Results by round ====
Round	1	2	3	4	5	6	7	8	9	10	11	12	13	14	15	16	17	18	19	20	21	22	23	24	25	26	27	28	29	30	31	32	33	34	35	36	37	38
Ground	H	A	H	A	H	H	A	H	A	A	H	A	H	A	H	A	H	A	H	A	H	A	H	A	A	H	A	H	H	A	H	A	H	A	H	A	H	A
Result	L	D	D	D	W	D	L	W	L	L	W	L	L	W	D	W	W	L	D	L	L	L	W	W	L	W	L	D	D	D	W	L	W	W	D	L	W	L
Position	12	12	11	12	10	11	12	8	10	12	10	13	14	12	11	9	5	6	8	10	10	12	11	10	11	8	9	9	9	9	8	10	10	8	9	9	9	9

Updated to match(es) played on 27 May 2007. Source: Competitive matches
A = Away; H = Home; W = Win; D = Draw; L = Loss

==== Matches ====
10 September 2006 1	Sampdoria	1–2	Empoli	Genoa
15:00 CEST	Bonazzoli 9'		Buscè 26'; Saudati 51' (pen.)	Stadium: Stadio Luigi Ferraris; Attendance: 18,960; Referee: Gabriele Gava

16 September 2006 2	Internazionale	1–1	Sampdoria	Milan
20:30 CEST	Bonanni 79' (o.g.)		Flachi 47' (pen.)	Stadium: San Siro; Attendance: 45,194; Referee: Paolo Tagliavento

20 September 2006 3	Sampdoria	3–3	Udinese	Genoa
20:30 CEST	G. Delvecchio 44'; Volpi 67'; Flachi 77'		Di Natale 3'; Iaquinta 16'; Asamoah 42'	Stadium: Stadio Luigi Ferraris; Attendance: 18,080; Referee: Paolo Bertini

24 September 2006 4	Ascoli	1–1	Sampdoria	Ascoli Piceno
15:00 CEST	M. Delvecchio 15'		G. Delvecchio 64'	Stadium: Stadio Cino e Lillo Del Duca; Attendance: 7,809; Referee: Paolo Mazzoleni

1 October 2006 5	Sampdoria	3–2	Parma	Genoa
15:00 CEST	D. Franceschini 22'; G. Delvecchio 52'; Bonazzoli 66'		Dessena 3'; Contini 77' (pen.)	Stadium: Stadio Luigi Ferraris; Attendance: 18,148; Referee: Nicola Rizzoli

14 October 2006 6	Sampdoria	1–1	Milan	Genoa
18:00 CEST	Bonazzoli 68'		Kaladze 83'	Stadium: Stadio Luigi Ferraris; Attendance: 25,334; Referee: Roberto Rosetti

22 October 2006 7	Atalanta	3–2	Sampdoria	Bergamo
15:00 CEST	Doni 37' (pen.), 83' (pen.); Zampagna 88'		Quagliarella 4', 10'	Stadium: Stadio Atleti Azzurri d'Italia; Attendance: 12,575; Referee: Andrea Romeo

25 October 2006 8	Sampdoria	2–0	Lazio	Genoa
20:30 CEST	Quagliarella 52'; Volpi 75' (pen.)			Stadium: Stadio Luigi Ferraris; Attendance: 17,966; Referee: Matteo Trefoloni

29 October 2006 9	Cagliari	1–0	Sampdoria	Cagliari
15:00 CET	Conti 45'			Stadium: Stadio Sant'Elia; Attendance: 10,500; Referee: Oberdan Pantana

5 November 2006 10	Palermo	2–0	Sampdoria	Palermo
15:00 CET	Corini 34'; Zaccardo 69'			Stadium: Stadio Renzo Barbera; Attendance: 22,244; Referee: Massimiliano Saccani

12 November 2006 11	Sampdoria	3–0	Chievo	Genoa
15:00 CET	Bonazzoli 18'; Quagliarella 27', 36'			Stadium: Stadio Luigi Ferraris; Attendance: 17,415; Referee: Luca Marelli

19 November 2006 12	Torino	1–0	Sampdoria	Turin
20:30 CET	Rosina 79' (pen.)			Stadium: Stadio Olimpico di Torino; Attendance: 20,565; Referee: Luca Banti

26 November 2006 13	Sampdoria	2–4	Roma	Genoa
15:00 CET	Volpi 14'; Flachi 90+2' (pen.)		Totti 13', 73'; Perrotta 32'; Panucci 43'	Stadium: Stadio Luigi Ferraris; Attendance: 22,929; Referee: Nicola Ayroldi

3 December 2006 14	Messina	0–2	Sampdoria	Messina
15:00 CET			D. Franceschini 20'; Quagliarella 90+1'	Stadium: Stadio San Filippo; Attendance: 10,306; Referee: Emidio Morganti

10 December 2006 15	Sampdoria	0–0	Siena	Genoa
15:00 CET				Stadium: Stadio Luigi Ferraris; Attendance: 17,661; Referee: Francesco Squillace

17 December 2006 16	Reggina	0–1	Sampdoria	Reggio Calabria
15:00 CET			Quagliarella 68'	Stadium: Stadio Oreste Granillo; Attendance: 10,738; Referee: Roberto Rosetti

20 December 2006 17	Sampdoria	4–1	Livorno	Genoa
20:30 CET	D. Franceschini 25'; Flachi 30' (pen.); Quagliarella 47', 57'		Vigiani 12'	Stadium: Stadio Luigi Ferraris; Attendance: 17,506; Referee: Luca Palanca

23 December 2006 18	Catania	4–2	Sampdoria	Catania
15:00 CET	Spinesi 6', 45' (pen.), 88'; Caserta 36'		Palombo 22'; D. Franceschini 40'	Stadium: Stadio Angelo Massimino; Attendance: 15,000; Referee: Paolo Mazzoleni

14 January 2007 19	Sampdoria	0–0	Fiorentina	Genoa
15:00 CET				Stadium: Stadio Luigi Ferraris; Attendance: 21,981; Referee: Gianluca Paparesta

21 January 2007 20	Empoli	2–0	Sampdoria	Empoli
15:00 CET	Saudati 55' (pen.); Matteini 87'			Stadium: Stadio Carlo Castellani; Attendance: 4,905; Referee: Luca Marelli

28 January 2007 21	Sampdoria	0–2	Internazionale	Genoa
20:30 CET			Ibrahimović 37'; Maicon 75'	Stadium: Stadio Luigi Ferraris; Attendance: 27,519; Referee: Nicola Rizzoli

11 February 2007 23	Sampdoria	2–0	Ascoli	Genoa
15:00 CET	Maggio 48'; D. Franceschini 75'			Stadium: Stadio Luigi Ferraris; Attendance: 18,200; Referee: Paolo Bertini

18 February 2007 24	Parma	0–1	Sampdoria	Parma
15:00 CET			Quagliarella 57'	Stadium: Stadio Ennio Tardini; Attendance: 11,000; Referee: Christian Brighi

25 February 2007 25	Milan	1–0	Sampdoria	Milan
20:30 CET	Ambrosini 89'			Stadium: San Siro; Attendance: 54,500; Referee: Nicola Ayroldi

28 February 2007 26	Sampdoria	2–1	Atalanta	Genoa
15:00 CET	Bazzani 70'; Volpi 83' (pen.)		Ventola 9'	Stadium: Stadio Luigi Ferraris; Attendance: 4,100; Referee: Daniele Orsato

4 March 2007 27	Lazio	1–0	Sampdoria	Rome
15:00 CET	Rocchi 22'			Stadium: Stadio Olimpico; Attendance: 18,700; Referee: Oscar Girardi

10 March 2007 28	Sampdoria	1–1	Cagliari	Genoa
20:30 CET	Palombo 39'		Suazo 63'	Stadium: Stadio Luigi Ferraris; Attendance: 18,500; Referee: Luca Banti

17 March 2007 29	Sampdoria	1–1	Palermo	Genoa
20:30 CET	Quagliarella 56'		Cavani 53'	Stadium: Stadio Luigi Ferraris; Attendance: 17,600; Referee: Emidio Morganti

1 April 2007 30	Chievo	1–1	Sampdoria	Verona
15:00 CEST	Brighi 33'		Quagliarella 27'	Stadium: Stadio Marcantonio Bentegodi; Attendance: 5,765; Referee: Nicola Ayroldi

7 April 2007 31	Sampdoria	1–0	Torino	Genoa
15:00 CEST	Bonazzoli 16'			Stadium: Stadio Luigi Ferraris; Attendance: 18,200; Referee: Oberdan Pantana

15 April 2007 32	Roma	4–0	Sampdoria	Rome
15:00 CEST	Totti 22', 66'; M. Ferrari 71'; Panucci 87'			Stadium: Stadio Olimpico; Attendance: 32,400; Referee: Emidio Morganti

18 April 2007 22	Udinese	1–0	Sampdoria	Udine
17:30 CEST	Iaquinta 52' (pen.)			Stadium: Stadio Friuli; Attendance: 8,500; Referee: Antonio Damato

21 April 2007 33	Sampdoria	3–1	Messina	Genoa
18:00 CEST	Ziegler 14'; D. Franceschini 82'; G. Delvecchio 89'		Riganò 54'	Stadium: Stadio Luigi Ferraris; Attendance: 16,700; Referee: Luca Banti

29 April 2007 34	Siena	0–2	Sampdoria	Siena
15:00 CEST			Maggio 39'; G. Delvecchio 89'	Stadium: Stadio Artemio Franchi; Attendance: 7,100; Referee: Christian Brighi

6 May 2007 35	Sampdoria	0–0	Reggina	Genoa
15:00 CEST				Stadium: Stadio Luigi Ferraris; Attendance: 11,200; Referee: Nicola Ayroldi

13 May 2007 36	Livorno	1–0	Sampdoria	Livorno
15:00 CEST	A. Filippini 72'			Stadium: Stadio Armando Picchi; Attendance: 16,500; Referee: Nicola Rizzoli

20 May 2007 37	Sampdoria	1–0	Catania	Genoa
15:00 CEST	C. Zenoni 65'			Stadium: Stadio Luigi Ferraris; Attendance: 16,200; Referee: Nicola Stefanini

27 May 2007 38	Fiorentina	5–1	Sampdoria	Florence
15:00 CEST	Mutu 5'; Montolivo 36'; Pazzini 48'; Reginaldo 73', 90+2'		Quagliarella 40'	Stadium: Stadio Artemio Franchi; Attendance: 29,200; Referee: Giorgio Lops

=== Coppa Italia ===
==== First round ====
19 August 2006	Benevento	0–2	Sampdoria	Benevento
20:00 CEST			Bonazzoli 85'; Quagliarella 90+3'	Stadium: Stadio Santa Colomba; Attendance: 4,000; Referee: Giorgio Lops

==== Second round ====
23 August 2006	Rimini	1–2	Sampdoria	Rimini
20:45 CEST	Jeda 51' (pen.)		Bonazzoli 38'; G. Delvecchio 87'	Stadium: Stadio Romeo Neri; Attendance: 5,500; Referee: Oberdan Pantana

==== Third round ====
27 August 2006	Bologna	2–3	Sampdoria	Bologna
20:30 CEST	Marazzina 28'; Meghni 70' (pen.)		Flachi 2', 44' (pen.); G. Delvecchio 51'	Stadium: Stadio Renato Dall'Ara; Attendance: 10,000; Referee: Roberto Rosetti

==== Round of 16 ====
8 November 2006 First leg	Sampdoria	1–0	Palermo	Genoa
20:30 CET	Bonazzoli 81'			Stadium: Stadio Luigi Ferraris; Attendance: 9,120; Referee: Gianluca Rocchi

30 November 2006 Second leg	Palermo	2–3 (2–4 agg.)	Sampdoria	Palermo
21:00 CET	Guana 65'; Brienza 81'		Flachi 14', 56'; C. Zenoni 34'	Stadium: Stadio Renzo Barbera; Attendance: 8,521; Referee: Oscar Girardi

==== Quarter-finals ====
10 January 2007 First leg	Sampdoria	1–0	Chievo	Genoa
20:30 CET	Sala 21'			Stadium: Stadio Luigi Ferraris; Attendance: 9,921; Referee: Christian Brighi

17 January 2007 Second leg	Chievo	1–2 (1–3 agg.)	Sampdoria	Verona
15:00 CET	Marcolini 44'		Bonazzoli 22'; G. Delvecchio 88'	Stadium: Stadio Marcantonio Bentegodi; Attendance: 1,629; Referee: Antonio Giannoccaro

==== Semi-finals ====
24 January 2007 First leg	Sampdoria	0–3	Internazionale	Genoa
21:00 CET			Burdisso 9', 55'; Crespo 24'	Stadium: Stadio Luigi Ferraris; Attendance: 12,484; Referee: Paolo Tagliavento

1 February 2007 Second leg	Internazionale	0–0 (3–0 agg.)	Sampdoria	Milan
21:00 CET				Stadium: San Siro; Attendance: 10,396; Referee: Christian Brighi
