= Giuseppe Marotta =

Italian football executive

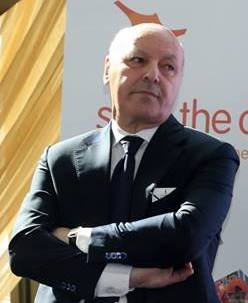
- Marotta in 2016

Chairman of Inter Milan
- Incumbent
- Assumed office 4 June 2024
- Preceded by: Steven Zhang

Personal details
- Born: 25 March 1957 (age 69) Varese, Lombardy, Italy
- Children: 2

Giuseppe "Beppe" Marotta (born 25 March 1957) is an Italian football executive who is currently the chairman and CEO of Italian football club Inter Milan. In 2014, he was inducted into the Italian Football Hall of Fame.

== Career ==
=== Early career ===
In 1978, at age 21, Marotta began his career in football when he was appointed as Director of Youth Department for his hometown club Varese. Just one year later, Marotta was promoted to general manager (GM) (Italian: Direttore Generale) of Varese and in his first season in charge saw his team promoted back to Serie B. With Marotta as GM, Varese would spend five consecutive seasons in Serie B. However, Marotta's final two seasons at Varese saw the club twice relegated, falling down to Serie C2 after the 1985–86 season.

After leaving Varese, Marotta was appointed GM of Serie C1 club Monza. During his tenure at Monza, the club were promoted to Serie B and spent two seasons there before going back down to Serie C1. After four seasons at Monza, Marotta moved on to serve as general director for Serie C1 club Como for three seasons, and then at Ravenna for two seasons, also in Serie C1.

In 1995, Marotta was hired by Maurizio Zamparini to serve as GM for Venezia, then playing in Serie B. While there, Venezia achieved a historic promotion back to Serie A in 1998, marking the club's first return to the top flight in more than 30 years. After five seasons at the club, Marotta left Venezia at the end of the 1999–2000 season, after Venezia was again relegated to Serie B. From Venezia, Marotta became GM for Serie A club Atalanta, where he served for two seasons. During his time at Atalanta, the club finished seventh and ninth in the Serie A table.

=== Sampdoria ===
Following the 2001–02 season, Marotta changed clubs again, this time moving to Sampdoria. At the time of Marotta's hiring, the club was coming off its lowest table finish since the founding of the club in 1908, a tenth place finish in the club's third-straight season in Serie B. However, the club had also recently been purchased by local Genoese oil industrialist Riccardo Garrone, which, in turn, added an influx of wealth to the struggling club. In his first season as GM, Marotta hired head coach Walter Novellino, the same coach who in 1998 had guided Venezia back to Serie A under Marotta. Together, and with new money at their disposal, Marotta and Novellino revamped the Sampdoria squad in the 2002 transfer window, adding both experienced Serie A veterans, such as Massimo Paganin, Sergio Volpi, Fabio Bazzani, and Stefano Bettarini, alongside several promising young players, such as Angelo Palombo, Maurizio Domizzi and Andrea Gasbarroni. This overhaul proved successful as Novellino guided Sampdoria to a second-place finish in the 2002–03 season, earning the club promotion back to Serie A, as well as a quarter-final finish in the Coppa Italia. In 2003–04, with the additions of Cristiano Doni and Francesco Antonioli, Sampdoria finished in eighth place, just missing out on UEFA Cup qualification.

In 2004, Marotta was appointed to serve as chief executive officer (CEO) (Italian: Amministratore delegato) of Sampdoria, in addition to his role of GM. Shortly after, Marotta hired ex-player Fabio Paratici to serve as chief observer/head of scouting for Sampdoria. Paratici worked very closely under the guidance of Marotta, often being described as his "right-hand man".

The 2004–05 season saw Sampdoria finish in sixth place, missing the UEFA Champions League qualification by just one point. Nevertheless, Sampdoria qualified for the UEFA Cup, marking the first time one of Marotta's teams had qualified for European competition. The 2005–06 and 2006–07 seasons saw the club finish 12th and 9th, respectively. Following the disappointing 2006–07 season, Marotta replaced manager Walter Novellino with Walter Mazzarri. The 2007 transfer season also saw Marotta bring in the controversial Italian forward Antonio Cassano on a year-long loan from Real Madrid with the option to purchase the player. The 2007–08 season saw the club finish in sixth place to again qualify for the UEFA Cup. Cassano joined the team permanently after the season ended, with the addition of highly regarded Giampaolo Pazzini from Fiorentina for a fee of €9 million in January 2009. However, Sampdoria struggled in the 2008–09 season, finishing in 13th place in Serie A, leading Marotta decided not to renew the expiring contract of head coach Walter Mazzarri.

After dismissing Mazzarri, Marotta hired head coach Luigi Delneri, himself coming off two successful seasons at Atalanta, for the 2009–10 season. Marotta also brought in several key players during the season's two transfer windows, including Daniele Mannini, Fernando Tissone, Nicola Pozzi and Marco Storari. Thanks to 28 Serie A goals from the striker partnership of Cassano and Pazzini, as well as Delniri's management, Sampdoria finished the 2009–10 season in fourth place, qualifying for the 2010–11 Champions League. In May 2010, it was heavily rumoured Juventus was interested in hiring Marotta, and Sampdoria's owner/president Riccardo Garrone openly stated he would gladly let Marotta leave for a more prestigious club.

=== Juventus ===
In May 2010, Marotta was officially brought to Juventus by newly elected club chairman Andrea Agnelli as GM for the Sports Area (Italian: Direttore Generale Area Sport) with a three-year contract, replacing Jean-Claude Blanc (who retained the role of chairman and CEO until October 2010). Juventus had just finished the season in seventh place, their worst since returning to Serie A after the Calciopoli scandal. In his move from Sampdoria to Juventus, Marotta also brought along head of scouting Fabio Paratici and head coach Luigi Delneri. On 27 October 2010, Marotta was appointed a member of Juventus' Board of Directors and named the club's CEO, replacing Jean-Claude Blanc. Aldo Mazzia, however was appointed chief financial officer (CFO) and CEO of the club in April and in May 2011 respectively.

Similar to his first transfer window upon taking over at Sampdoria, Marotta spent the first year in charge of transfer operations at Juventus making wholesale changes to the squad, acquiring 14 new players, including Miloš Krasić, Fabio Quagliarella, Alessandro Matri and Alberto Aquilani;) while offloading 11 players, including club legend David Trezeguet and Brazilian playmaker Diego, moves which were unpopular with fans. Juventus finished the 2010–11 season in seventh place, missing out again on Champions League football and also having failed to advance past the group stages of the 2010–11 UEFA Europa League. Following the disappointing season, Marotta and the club announced manager Luigi Delneri would not be returning for another season.

On 31 May 2011, Marotta announced the appointment of former Juventus player and captain Antonio Conte as head coach. Conte's appointment was met with some skepticism due to his inexperience in top-flight football. Marotta stated in an interview with Corriere dello Sport that the club's objectives for the new season were to win the Scudetto or at least qualify for the Champions League. During the 2011–12 summer transfer window, Marotta set about to improve last years finish by bringing in eight new players to the squad, including Andrea Pirlo and Michele Pazienza on free transfers, along with Stephan Lichtsteiner, Arturo Vidal, Mirko Vučinić, Emanuele Giaccherini, Marcelo Estigarribia and Eljero Elia. In May 2012, Juventus won their first Scudetto in six years.

Since Juventus' surprise run to the 2015 Champions League final, Marotta and the club administration have been praised for assembling one of Europe's top midfields at a minimal cost, with first choice midfielders Paul Pogba (free), Arturo Vidal (€10.5 million), Andrea Pirlo (free) and Claudio Marchisio (youth product/free), as well as several back-up midfielders on loan, all costing a cumulative total less than €15 million and contributing over one-third of the goals scored in all competitions that season.

On 31 October 2018, Marotta officially terminated his contract as Juventus CEO.

=== Inter Milan ===
On 13 December 2018, Marotta officially joined Inter Milan as sporting CEO. Inter have won several trophies since, including the Scudetto in 2021 and 2024, two Coppa Italia finals 2022 and 2023, and three Supercoppa Italiana titles in 2021, 2022 and 2023. They also made it to the finals of the UEFA Europa League in 2020 and the UEFA Champions League in 2023 and 2025, although losing to Sevilla, Manchester City and Paris Saint-Germain respectively. Before he joined, Inter went through a ten-year trophy drought and under his leadership, Inter has signed the likes of Antonio Conte and Simone Inzaghi to coach the club. Henrikh Mkhitaryan, Romelu Lukaku, Achraf Hakimi, Nicolò Barella, Christian Eriksen, Andre Onana, Hakan Çalhanoğlu, Matteo Darmian, Edin Džeko, Marcus Thuram and Alexis Sánchez are some of his notable signings at the club, with many of these players contributing to Inter's recent success.

On 4 June 2024, following the demise of previous owners Suning Holdings Group and the acquisition of the club by Oaktree Capital Management, Marotta became President and Sporting CEO of the club following a shareholders' meeting.
