= 2004–05 UC Sampdoria season =

Sampdoria
2004–05 season
- Chairman: Riccardo Garrone
- Manager: Walter Novellino
- Serie A: 5th
- Coppa Italia: Quarter-finals
- Top goalscorer: Francesco Flachi (14)

UC Sampdoria enjoyed its best season since 1993–94, when the club finished third in Serie A and won Coppa Italia. In 2004-05 Sampdoria was able to finish fifth in the standings, thanks to a robust defence and a goalscoring ace in secondary striker Francesco Flachi, who played the football of his life. With only 29 goals conceded, the defence of Sampdoria was fully comparable with those of top sides Juventus and Milan, and coach Walter Novellino was hailed for the strong performance in the club's second season since its return to Serie A.

== Squad ==
=== Goalkeepers ===
- (Italy) Francesco Antonioli
- (Italy) Luigi Turci
- (Italy) Daniele Padelli
- (Italy) Emanuele Bianchi

=== Defenders ===
- (Italy) Moris Carrozzieri
- (Italy) Marcello Castellini
- (Italy) Giulio Falcone
- (Italy) Marco Pisano
- (Italy) Simone Pavan
- (Italy) Stefano Sacchetti
- (Italy) Cristian Zenoni

=== Midfielders ===
- (Italy) Sergio Volpi
- (Italy) Andrea Gasbarroni
- (Ghana) Mark Edusei
- (Italy) Angelo Palombo
- (Italy) Max Tonetto
- (Italy) Aimo Diana
- (Italy) Cristiano Doni
- (Italy) Vincenzo Iacopino
- (Italy) Biagio Pagano

=== Attackers ===
- (Italy) Simone Inzaghi
- (Italy) Francesco Flachi
- (Italy) Fabio Bazzani
- (Belarus) Vitali Kutuzov
- (Italy) Fausto Rossini
- (Cameroon) Thomas Job

== Competitions ==
=== Serie A ===
==== League table ====
Pos	Team	Pld	W	D	L	GF	GA	GD	Pts	Qualification or relegation
3	Internazionale	38	18	18	2	65	37	+28	72	Qualification to Champions League third qualifying round
4	Udinese	38	17	11	10	56	40	+16	62	Qualification to Champions League third qualifying round
5	Sampdoria	38	17	10	11	42	29	+13	61	Qualification to UEFA Cup first round
6	Palermo	38	12	17	9	48	44	+4	53	Qualification to UEFA Cup first round
7	Messina	38	12	12	14	44	52	−8	48	

Source: 2004–05 Serie A, RSSSF.com, Soccerway
Rules for classification: 1) Points; 2) Head-to-head points; 3) Head-to-head goal difference; 4) Goal difference; 5) Goals scored; 6) Draw. (Note: Head-to-head record is used only after all the matches between the teams in question have been played).

==== Results summary ====
Overall								Home						Away					
Pld	W	D	L	GF	GA	GD	Pts	W	D	L	GF	GA	GD	W	D	L	GF	GA	GD
38	17	10	11	42	29	+13	61	10	3	6	21	13	+8	7	7	5	21	16	+5

Last updated: 29 May 2005.
Source: Competitive matches

==== Results by round ====
Round	1	2	3	4	5	6	7	8	9	10	11	12	13	14	15	16	17	18	19	20	21	22	23	24	25	26	27	28	29	30	31	32	33	34	35	36	37	38
Ground	H	A	H	A	H	A	H	A	H	A	H	A	H	A	H	A	H	A	H	A	H	A	H	A	H	A	H	A	H	A	H	A	H	A	H	A	H	A
Result	L	L	L	W	W	W	L	W	L	D	D	L	W	D	W	W	W	L	D	W	D	W	W	L	W	W	W	L	L	D	W	D	W	D	W	D	L	D
Position	18	18	19	16	11	9	11	7	12	11	11	13	9	9	8	6	5	5	6	5	6	5	5	5	5	3	3	4	5	5	4	4	4	5	5	5	5	5

Updated to match(es) played on 29 May 2005. Source: Competitive matches
A = Away; H = Home; W = Win; D = Draw; L = Loss

==== Matches ====
12 September 2004 1	Sampdoria	0–1	Lazio	Genoa
20:30 CEST			Di Canio 29' (pen.)	Stadium: Stadio Luigi Ferraris; Attendance: 24,298; Referee: Roberto Rosetti

19 September 2004 2	Siena	2–1	Sampdoria	Siena
15:00 CEST	Vergassola 10'; Portanova 71'		Flachi 5'	Stadium: Stadio Artemio Franchi; Attendance: 9,500; Referee: Nicola Ayroldi

22 September 2004 3	Sampdoria	0–3	Juventus	Genoa
20:30 CEST			Del Piero 19' (pen.); Ibrahimović 69'; Trezeguet 87'	Stadium: Stadio Luigi Ferraris; Attendance: 32,102; Referee: Paolo Dondarini

26 September 2004 4	Fiorentina	0–2	Sampdoria	Florence
15:00 CEST			Bazzani 11'; Sacchetti 64'	Stadium: Stadio Artemio Franchi; Attendance: 31,890; Referee: Diego Preschern

3 October 2004 5	Sampdoria	2–0	Livorno	Genoa
15:00 CEST	F. Rossini 78'; Diana 88'			Stadium: Stadio Luigi Ferraris; Attendance: 23,430; Referee: Roberto Rosetti

17 October 2004 6	Reggina	0–1	Sampdoria	Reggio Calabria
20:30 CEST			Bazzani 36'	Stadium: Stadio Oreste Granillo; Attendance: 15,520; Referee: Nicola Rizzoli

24 October 2004 7	Sampdoria	0–1	Brescia	Genoa
15:00 CEST			Di Biagio 56' (pen.)	Stadium: Stadio Luigi Ferraris; Attendance: 22,000; Referee: Massimiliano Saccani

27 October 2004 8	Chievo	0–2	Sampdoria	Verona
20:30 CEST			Volpi 32'; Diana 35'	Stadium: Stadio Marcantonio Bentegodi; Attendance: 8,334; Referee: Gianluca Paparesta

31 October 2004 9	Sampdoria	0–1	Milan	Genoa
18:00 CET			Shevchenko 76'	Stadium: Stadio Luigi Ferraris; Attendance: 28,226; Referee: Stefano Farina

7 November 2004 10	Atalanta	0–0	Sampdoria	Bergamo
15:00 CET				Stadium: Stadio Atleti Azzurri d'Italia; Attendance: 14,150; Referee: Pierluigi Collina

10 November 2004 11	Sampdoria	0–0	Cagliari	Genoa
20:30 CET				Stadium: Stadio Luigi Ferraris; Attendance: 20,699; Referee: Domenico Messina

14 November 2004 12	Palermo	2–0	Sampdoria	Palermo
15:00 CET	Toni 18'; Brienza 47'			Stadium: Stadio Renzo Barbera; Attendance: 33,077; Referee: Oscar Girardi

28 November 2004 13	Sampdoria	1–0	Parma	Genoa
15:00 CET	Flachi 90+2' (pen.)			Stadium: Stadio Luigi Ferraris; Attendance: 21,479; Referee: Domenico Messina

5 December 2004 14	Roma	1–1	Sampdoria	Rome
20:30 CET	Totti 84' (pen.)		Pagano 81'	Stadium: Stadio Olimpico; Attendance: 43,887; Referee: Daniele Tombolini

12 December 2004 15	Sampdoria	1–0	Messina	Genoa
15:00 CET	Flachi 16'			Stadium: Stadio Luigi Ferraris; Attendance: 21,134; Referee: Domenico Messina

19 December 2004 16	Lecce	1–4	Sampdoria	Lecce
15:00 CET	Vučinić 54'		Flachi 38' (pen.), 50'; Tonetto 61'; Kutuzov 90+2'	Stadium: Stadio Via del Mare; Attendance: 12,730; Referee: Nicola Ayroldi

6 January 2005 17	Sampdoria	2–0	Udinese	Genoa
15:00 CET	Flachi 68'; De Sanctis 75' (o.g.)			Stadium: Stadio Luigi Ferraris; Attendance: 23,902; Referee: Pierluigi Collina

9 January 2005 18	Internazionale	3–2	Sampdoria	Milan
15:00 CET	Martins 88'; C. Vieri 90+1'; Recoba 90+3'		Tonetto 44'; Kutuzov 83'	Stadium: San Siro; Attendance: 58,989; Referee: Paolo Bertini

16 January 2005 19	Sampdoria	0–0	Bologna	Genoa
15:00 CET				Stadium: Stadio Luigi Ferraris; Attendance: 22,306; Referee: Marco Gabriele

23 January 2005 20	Lazio	1–2	Sampdoria	Rome
15:00 CET	Rocchi 64'		Kutuzov 1'; Flachi 4' (pen.)	Stadium: Stadio Olimpico; Attendance: 33,716; Referee: Michele Cruciani

30 January 2005 21	Sampdoria	1–1	Siena	Genoa
15:00 CET	F. Rossini 79'		Vergassola 66'	Stadium: Stadio Luigi Ferraris; Attendance: 20,389; Referee: Gianluca Paparesta

2 February 2005 22	Juventus	0–1	Sampdoria	Turin
20:30 CET			Diana 34'	Stadium: Stadio Delle Alpi; Attendance: 20,016; Referee: Domenico Messina

6 February 2005 23	Sampdoria	3–0	Fiorentina	Genoa
18:00 CET	Flachi 15'; Tonetto 33'; Diana 74'			Stadium: Stadio Luigi Ferraris; Attendance: 22,108; Referee: Paolo Dondarini

13 February 2005 24	Livorno	1–0	Sampdoria	Livorno
15:00 CET	C. Lucarelli 82'			Stadium: Stadio Armando Picchi; Attendance: 15,734; Referee: Paolo Tagliavento

20 February 2005 25	Sampdoria	3–2	Reggina	Genoa
15:00 CET	Flachi 8', 45', 70' (pen.)		G. Colucci 49'; Gia. Tedesco 88'	Stadium: Stadio Luigi Ferraris; Attendance: 20,340; Referee: Paolo Dondarini

27 February 2005 26	Brescia	0–1	Sampdoria	Brescia
18:00 CET			Tonetto 76'	Stadium: Stadio Mario Rigamonti; Attendance: 7,276; Referee: Danilo Nucini

6 March 2005 27	Sampdoria	1–0	Chievo	Genoa
15:00 CET	Gasbarroni 82'			Stadium: Stadio Luigi Ferraris; Attendance: 21,854; Referee: Paolo Dondarini

13 March 2005 28	Milan	1–0	Sampdoria	Milan
15:00 CET	Kakà 65'			Stadium: San Siro; Attendance: 69,441; Referee: Roberto Rosetti

20 March 2005 29	Sampdoria	1–2	Atalanta	Genoa
15:00 CET	Doni 30'		Makinwa 2'; Natali 68'	Stadium: Stadio Luigi Ferraris; Attendance: 22,964; Referee: Stefano Farina

10 April 2005 30	Cagliari	0–0	Sampdoria	Cagliari
15:00 CEST				Stadium: Stadio Sant'Elia; Attendance: 15,000; Referee: Nicola Ayroldi

17 April 2005 31	Sampdoria	1–0	Palermo	Genoa
20:30 CEST	Flachi 90+1' (pen.)			Stadium: Stadio Luigi Ferraris; Attendance: 24,517; Referee: Pasquale Rodomonti

20 April 2005 32	Parma	1–1	Sampdoria	Parma
20:30 CEST	Gilardino 39'		Gasbarroni 35'	Stadium: Stadio Ennio Tardini; Attendance: 13,255; Referee: Pierluigi Collina

24 April 2005 33	Sampdoria	2–1	Roma	Genoa
15:00 CEST	Tonetto 33'; Flachi 79' (pen.)		Montella 90+3' (pen.)	Stadium: Stadio Luigi Ferraris; Attendance: 23,969; Referee: Gianluca Paparesta

1 May 2005 34	Messina	2–2	Sampdoria	Messina
15:00 CEST	Zampagna 31', 60'		Flachi 27'; Volpi 75'	Stadium: Stadio San Filippo; Attendance: 28,147; Referee: Roberto Rosetti

8 May 2005 35	Sampdoria	3–0	Lecce	Genoa
15:00 CEST	Diana 23'; Kutuzov 31'; Edusei 87'			Stadium: Stadio Luigi Ferraris; Attendance: 22,469; Referee: Marco Gabriele

15 May 2005 36	Udinese	1–1	Sampdoria	Udine
15:00 CEST	M. Pisano 36' (o.g.)		Castellini 25'	Stadium: Stadio Friuli; Attendance: 22,492; Referee: Paolo Bertini

22 May 2005 37	Sampdoria	0–1	Internazionale	Genoa
15:00 CEST			Adriano 36'	Stadium: Stadio Luigi Ferraris; Attendance: 31,673; Referee: Salvatore Racalbuto

29 May 2005 38	Bologna	0–0	Sampdoria	Bologna
15:00 CEST				Stadium: Stadio Renato Dall'Ara; Attendance: 30,796; Referee: Gianluca Paparesta

==== Topscorers ====
- (Italy) Francesco Flachi 14
- (Italy) Max Tonetto 5
- (Italy) Aimo Diana 4
- (Belarus) Vitaly Kutuzov 4

=== Coppa Italia ===
==== Round of 16 ====
19 November 2004 First leg	Torino	0–2	Sampdoria	Turin
15:00 CET			Doni 78'; Kutuzov 90'	Stadium: Stadio Delle Alpi; Attendance: 4,669; Referee: Alberto Castellani

12 January 2005 Second leg	Sampdoria	1–2 (3–2 agg.)	Torino	Genoa
20:30 CET	Kutuzov 59'		Franco 49', 82'	Stadium: Stadio Luigi Ferraris; Attendance: 7,056; Referee: Mario Mazzoleni

==== Quarter-finals ====
27 January 2005 First leg	Cagliari	2–0	Sampdoria	Cagliari
18:00 CET	Bianchi 4'; Suazo 24'			Stadium: Stadio Sant'Elia; Attendance: 8,000; Referee: Daniele Tombolini

17 March 2005 Second leg	Sampdoria	3–2 (3–4 agg.)	Cagliari	Genoa
18:00 CET	Doni 18', 42'; Kutuzov 37'		Mau. Esposito 21', 81'	Stadium: Stadio Luigi Ferraris; Attendance: 6,856; Referee: Luca Palanca
