= Francesco Flachi =

Italian footballer (born 1975)

Personal information
- Date of birth: 8 April 1975 (age 51)
- Place of birth: Florence, Italy
- Height: 1.72 m (5 ft 8 in)
- Position: Striker

Team information
- Current team: Praese

Youth career
- Isolotto
- Fiorentina

Senior career*
Years	Team	Apps	(Gls)
1993–1999	Fiorentina	37	(4)
1996–1997	→ Bari (loan)	21	(3)
1998	→ Ancona (loan)	17	(10)
1999–2007	Sampdoria	241	(87)
2009	Empoli	13	(3)
2009–2010	Brescia	14	(2)
2022	Signa	1	(0)
2022–	Praese	15	(4)
Total		353	(129)

International career
1993–1994	Italy U18	9	(3)
- * Club domestic league appearances and goals

Francesco Flachi (born 8 April 1975) is an Italian former professional footballer, currently playing for Promozione amateurs Praese.

A striker, during an 18-year professional career in which he amassed Serie A totals of 137 games and 42 goals, he played mainly with Sampdoria. He was also suspended twice for doping.

== Club career ==
=== Fiorentina ===
Born in Florence, Flachi made his professional debuts with local giants AC Fiorentina, appearing in ten Serie B games and scoring twice as the 1993–94 season ended in promotion. He made his Serie A debut on 4 September 1994, against Cagliari Calcio, in a 2–1 win.

Flachi would appear rarely for the Viola in the top flight, however, facing stiff competition from the likes of Gabriel Batistuta and Luís Oliveira - only three league games in each of his three last seasons. He also served two loans whilst on contract with the club, with AS Bari and AC Ancona (both in the second division), scoring an impressive ten goals in only 17 games with the latter.

=== Sampdoria ===
After leaving his childhood club in the 1999 summer, Flachi moved to UC Sampdoria, freshly relegated to the second level. He scored career-bests 17 and 16 goals in his second and third seasons, under manager Luigi Cagni who had succeeded Giampiero Ventura.

In 2002–03, Flachi netted nine times in 35 games as Samp finally achieved promotion, as champions. He became known by the Genovese club fans as "Salvatore della patria" ("Saviour of the homeland" in Italian), and also welcomed his first daughter, Valentina.

However, Flachi's relationship with new Sampdoria manager Walter Novellino was not ideal, with the pair having numerous arguments on and off the pitch. The player paid for his attitude by remaining on the bench in the first half of the 2003–04 campaign. As the partnership of Massimo Marazzina and Atsushi Yanagisawa did not click, the manager began playing Flachi and Fabio Bazzani with good results; the team eventually finished in eighth position, with 24 goals between Flachi (11) and Bazzani (13).

In 2004–05, with 14 goals in 35 appearances, Flachi nearly helped Sampdoria earn UEFA Champions League qualification, with the team finally ranking fifth, with the subsequent return to the UEFA Cup. In the following campaign, he continued to display solid performances (again scoring in double digits), this time accompanied by Emiliano Bonazzoli up front; however, the team failed to qualify from the UEFA Cup group stage, and finished 14th in the league (12th after the match-fixing scandal).

=== Betting and cocaine ===
On 21 September 2006, Flachi was suspended for two months by the Italian Football Federation as investigations concluded he and teammate Moris Carrozzieri were gathering information for gamblers in Italian football. Their club received a €20,000 fine.

Trace amounts of cocaine were found in Flachi's system in a random test after a 2–0 away loss against to Inter Milan on 28 January 2007. On 31 May, he was suspended for 16 months and, later, the ban was increased to two years. As a result, his contract with Sampdoria was canceled.

Following the ban, Flachi started training with Eccellenza Tuscany team Pietrasanta, hoping to return into active football once his ban expired. In June 2008, second division outfit Empoli FC completed his signing; he returned to competitive football in January of the following year.

In the 2009 summer, Flachi penned a deal with another club in division two, Brescia Calcio. He played 14 games, mostly as a substitute, until he was suspended again in January 2010 following a positive for cocaine in a test held on 19 December of the previous year; in June, he was handed a 12-year ban, effectively ending his career as a player.

=== Comeback ===
In 2021, Flachi announced he had been training with the Italy fifth-tier team Signa 1914, and was planning to make a comeback as a player when his ban expired in January 2022. On 13 February 2022, at almost 47 years of age, he played his debut game for Signa, playing the first 30 minutes in an Eccellenza amateur league game. He successively moved back to Genoa and signed for Promozione amateurs Praese during the summer of 2022, with whom he finally scored his first league goal since his comeback in October at the age of 47.

== International career ==
Flachi represented Italy national U18 team at the 1992 UEFA European Under-18 Championship. He was called up once by the main squad, for a friendly with Iceland in August 2004, but would never make his debut.

== Career statistics ==
As of 8 September 2021

Club statistics
Club	Season	League			Cup		Other		Total	
Club	Season	Division	Apps	Goals	Apps	Goals	Apps	Goals	Apps	Goals
Fiorentina	1993–94	Serie B	10	2	0	0	0	0	10	2
Fiorentina	1994–95	Serie A	21	2	4	0	0	0	25	2
Fiorentina	1995–96	Serie A	3	0	2	0	0	0	5	0
Fiorentina	1996–97	Serie A	0	0	0	0	0	0	0	0
Fiorentina	1997–98	Serie A	3	0	4	1	0	0	7	1
Fiorentina	1998–99	Serie A	0	0	0	0	0	0	0	0
Fiorentina	Total		37	4	10	1	0	0	47	5
Bari (loan)	1996–97	Serie B	21	3	3	2	0	0	24	5
Ancona (loan)	1997–98	Serie B	17	10	0	0	0	0	17	10
Sampdoria	1999–00	Serie B	28	5	5	6	0	0	33	11
Sampdoria	2000–01	Serie B	34	17	6	2	0	0	40	19
Sampdoria	2001–02	Serie B	37	16	6	4	0	0	43	20
Sampdoria	2002–03	Serie B	35	9	5	3	0	0	40	12
Sampdoria	2003–04	Serie A	28	11	2	0	0	0	30	11
Sampdoria	2004–05	Serie A	35	14	3	0	0	0	38	14
Sampdoria	2005–06	Serie A	31	11	2	2	6 (Note: Appearances in the 2005–06 UEFA Cup)	2	39	15
Sampdoria	2006–07	Serie A	13	4	4	4	0	0	17	8
Sampdoria	Total		241	87	33	21	6	2	280	110
Empoli	2008–09	Serie B	13	3	0	0	2 (Note: Appearances in the 2008–09 Serie B Promotion Play-offs)	0	15	3
Brescia	2009–10	Serie B	14	2	0	0	0	0	14	2
Career totals			343	109	46	24	8	2	397	135

== Honours ==
Fiorentina

- Serie B: 1993–94
- Coppa Italia: 1995–96; Runner-up 1998–99

Sampdoria

- Serie B: 2002–03
