= Fabio Paratici =

Italian football executive and former player (born 1972)

Personal information
- Date of birth: 13 July 1972 (age 54)
- Place of birth: Borgonovo Val Tidone, Italy
- Positions: Defender; midfielder

Team information
- Current team: Fiorentina (sporting director)

Youth career
- Piacenza

Senior career*
Years	Team	Apps	(Gls)
1989–1991	Piacenza	5	(0)
1991–1992	Palazzolo	11	(0)
1992–1994	Fiorenzuola	43	(0)
1994–1995	Sassuolo	5	(0)
1995–1996	Pavia	31	(1)
1996	Sassuolo	0	(0)
1997	Marsala	15	(0)
1997–1998	Novara	28	(1)
1998–1999	Palermo	16	(0)
1999–2000	Lecco	21	(0)
2000–2001	Savoia	27	(1)
2001	Giugliano	19	(0)
2002–2004	Brindisi	48	(2)
- * Club domestic league appearances and goals

Fabio Paratici (born 13 July 1972) is an Italian football executive and former player who is the sporting director of Serie A club Fiorentina.

He made his professional debut as a footballer with Piacenza in 1989, playing in Serie C1, the third tier of Italian football at the time. During his playing career, Paratici frequently moved throughout the lower divisions of Italian football, playing for various clubs in Serie C1 and Serie C2. He retired in 2004 at the age of 31, having played for 12 different clubs in 15 years.

After his playing career ended, he remained involved in football through management. Paratici worked as chief observer and head of scouting of Italian club Sampdoria and established a successful partnership with Giuseppe Marotta that was repeated at Juventus, where he worked as chief football officer for about eleven years.

In June 2021, Paratici joined English club Tottenham Hotspur as managing director of football, resigning on 21 April 2023 after his conviction for financial malpractice in the Italian Football Federation Plusvalenze investigation, and returning on 15 October 2025. The Plusvalenze sports trial also carried a 30-month ban from football, which FIFA extended worldwide. Paratici has also been indicted in an Italian criminal investigation into the same instances of financial malpractice and is currently awaiting trial.

== Playing career ==
Born in Borgonovo Val Tidone, in the province of Piacenza, Emilia Romagna, on 13 July 1972, Paratici began playing in Borgonovese, a club in his native town with which he won several youth championships. He was a right-back defender and midfielder; over the course of his career, he was deployed as a wild card in all roles in the defence and midfield. In 1986, he moved to Piacenza, where he became captain of the Campionato Nazionale Primavera team coached by Natalino Gottardo that included future star Filippo Inzaghi. In the 1989–90 Serie C1, he made his debut in the first team, playing 5 games in the season finale. At Piacenza, Paratici won the 1990–91 Serie C1. In the following years, he was loaned to the lower divisions, first to Palazzolo and then to Fiorenzuola, where he remained for two seasons, and won a promotion to Serie C1.

At the end of the 1993–94 Serie C1 season, Paratici was involved in a car accident; he suffered numerous fractures that left him injured for a year. Paratici resumed activity in the 1995–96 Serie C2 season as a starter with Pavia. He was not confirmed and briefly joined the Serie D with Sassuolo, and then played for Marsala. In 1997, he was hired by Serie C2-demoted Novara, and signaled himself as one of the best players of the 1997–98 Serie C2. At the end of the season, he joined the Palermo of Massimo Morgia, who had coached him in Marsala. In 1998, he moved to Lecco for the 1998–99 Serie C1 season. He then joined Savoia for the 2000–01 Serie C1 season, and then moved to Giugliano for the 2001–02 Serie C2 season. In 2002, he moved to Brindisi, with whom they won the Coppa Italia Serie C in 2003. He remained there until he ended his 15-year career at the age of 32 in 2004. On five occasions, he unsuccessfully reached the playoff finals in both Serie C1 and Serie C2.

== Executive career ==
Upon retiring, Paratici was hired as the chief observer and head of scouting for Sampdoria in 2004. During his tenure at Sampdoria, Paratici worked closely with the club's sporting director and subsequently its CEO, Giuseppe Marotta; the press called him Marotta's "right-hand man". During this management, Sampdoria achieved important goals, such as the 2010–11 UEFA Champions League qualifying phase and play-off round with the first team and the first place for the youth team in the 2009–10 Campionato Primavera. Paratici described their work as "complementary". In August 2008, Paratici was allegedly approached by Urbano Cairo, owner and chairman of Torino, and offered the position of sporting director. Sampdoria and in particular Marotta were upset about these rumours, and accused Cairo of going behind their backs trying to lure Paratici, who was still under contract with Sampdoria until 2009.

In May 2010, Paratici moved from Sampdoria to Juventus, along with Marotta and coach Luigi Delneri. At Juventus, Paratici was appointed head of technical affairs and sporting director by chairman Andrea Agnelli. Sampdoria owner Riccardo Garrone was reported to be upset with Marotta for taking Paratici with him to Juventus, as Garrone had expected Paratici to inherit the role of director general at Sampdoria, and subsequently threatened to block any transfers to Juventus as retaliation. At Juventus, Paratici is notable for his transfer moves that brought the club a cycle of successes, including the Italian defender Andrea Barzagli (2011), who formed along with Leonardo Bonucci and Giorgio Chiellini a top defensive lineup that came to be known as the BBC from their initials, the Chilean midfielder Arturo Vidal (2011), and the forwards Argentines Carlos Tevez (2013) and Paulo Dybala (2015). In 2018, he played a key role in the purchase of the Portuguese star Cristiano Ronaldo from Real Madrid, which remains the most expensive transfer in the history of Italian football.

In November 2018, Paratici took over from Marotta as sporting director, and then took on the role of managing director from October 2020. On 26 May 2021, after eleven years with the club, Paratici's expiring contract was not renewed, and he left Juventus; his successor was Federico Cherubini, who was the sporting director of the club's youth teams and was promoted to technical director of the first team after Marotta's farewell. Under his management, Juventus experienced one of the most victorious cycles in its history, with 19 total trophies, including an unprecedented, record-breaking nine consecutive Serie A (scudetto) titles, along with four consecutive Serie A–Coppa Italia national doubles and one national treble (Serie A–Coppa Italia–Supercoppa Italiana), as well as one UEFA Europa League semifinal and two UEFA Champions League finals.

On 12 June 2021, Premier League club Tottenham Hotspur announced that Paratici would be taking over as their managing director of football. In his first season, Tottenham improved from the seventh place to the fourth place of the 2021–22 Premier League season. Among those who made significant contributions to the club's successful top four challenge in the season were several former Juventus players. He signed former Juventus player and coach Antonio Conte and two players directly from his former club Juventus, Dejan Kulusevski and Rodrigo Bentancur, as well as former Juventus product Cristian Romero. On 21 April 2023, Paratici resigned from his position at Tottenham after losing his appeal against a worldwide ban imposed by FIFA. On 15 October 2025, Tottenham Hotspur announced the return of Paratici as one of two sporting directors following the expiration of his ban. On 14 January 2026, Tottenham Hotspur announced that Paratici would be departing from his role as co-sporting director.

On 4 February 2026, Serie A club Fiorentina announced the appointment of Paratici as their new sporting director.

== Capital gains investigation ==
On 20 January 2023, as part of the reopening of the Plusvalenza investigation into alleged overvaluation of players' contracts and citing new facts, the court of appeal of the Italian Football Federation (FIGC) accepted in part the appeal of the Federal Prosecutor's Office on the partial revocation of the acquittal decision of the same court from May 2022. Paratici was suspended for 30 months from holding office in Italian football as punishment for capital gain violations; its former club was docked 15 points. This was unprecedented for several reasons. Firstly, past judgements mainly hit the clubs and were limited to fines, not penalty points; (Note: While the Plusvalenza case and its punishment is due to capital gains about footballers and their alleged inflated price, a widespread practice in the football world, the cases of Chievo and Cesena involved footballers that did not exist, which is not the case of Juventus, in the sense that the two clubs did not enter into any contract. Their punishments were 3 and 15 points docked, respectively; the two sentences were not final and did not pass judgement, as the two companies went bankrupt. Additionally, the original requested punishment for Juventus was €800,000, which was significantly higher than any past punishments but was in line in capital gains resulting in fines for the companies.) secondly, capital gains are widespread not only in Italy but in the football world, are not illegal, and there is no law regulating them in football; thirdly, the FIGC prosecution changed the charge of Article 31, the one related to the budget that usually warrants fines, and added an Article 4 violation, which is related to loyalty, after two past judgements acquitted Juventus and all other clubs involved. Upon the publication of the court's motivations on 30 January 2023, the club and its involved directors, including Paratici, immediately announced they would appeal to the Italian National Olympic Committee (CONI), which would rule on whether there were defects of form, not on the sentence's merit, and thus the club, which denied any wrongdoing, focused on such issues; the CONI appeal was officially deposited on 28 February 2023. In March 2023, a preliminary hearing about the Prisma case is scheduled to be held and determinate whether the case would be closed or not.

Alongside Federico Cherubini, the other Juventus director involved in the legal issue, Paratici filed an appeal to the Regional Administrative Tribunal (TAR) of Lazio to have the FIGC release to the legal defence a note with Convisoc, named 10940 and dated to April 2021, which could show that other clubs and directors were involved or could not entered Serie A, and that the start of the investigation should be retrodated and thus the sentence annulled for having violated the proceeding's limit of time; the FIGC denied several times the release of the document to the defences on the grounds that it was not relevant. In its sentence on 8 March 2023, the TAR criticized the FIGC, which declined to be a party in the CONI appeal, and ruled that the document must be sent to the defenses. The FIGC appealed to Italy's Council of State to have the TAR's sentence revoked on the grounds that Juventus appealed to the TAR when this is available after the three instances of judgement are exhausted; the appeal came from Paratici and Cherubini, not the club, and the FIGC's appeal was rejected. The same body announced that on 23 March it would rule on the merit of the FIGC's actions and whether the document can be used in the CONI appeal later in the month. While the note did not name Juventus, it acknowledged the difficulty of an objective value in regards to capital gains; some observers questioned why the defences were not given access if it was irrelevant. Alongside the other parties, Paratici received the note preceding this document, dated 31 March 2021, on 14 March 2023; this time, the FIGC made no appeal or opposition and delivered the document, which did not name Juventus but discussed the difficulty of determining an objective value of traded players. On 31 March 2023, Spurs announced that Paratici would take a leave of absence from his role as the managing director of football pending the outcome of an appeal filed after FIFA extended his ban over Juventus's dealings to apply worldwide. Paratici resigned from Tottenham on 21 April 2023 after his appeal was rejected. He returned in October 2025.
