= Simone Barone =

Italian footballer (born 1978)

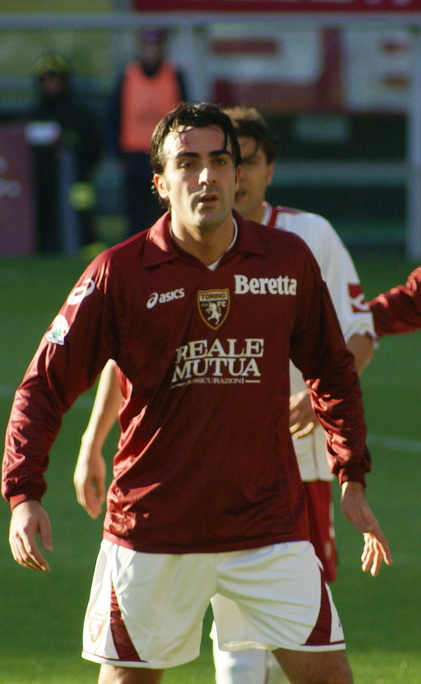
- Barone playing for Torino in 2008

Personal information
- Full name: Simone Barone
- Date of birth: 30 April 1978 (age 48)
- Place of birth: Nocera Inferiore, Italy
- Height: 1.78 m (5 ft 10 in)
- Position: Central midfielder

Youth career
- 1995–1997: Parma

Senior career*
Years	Team	Apps	(Gls)
1997–2000	Parma	2	(0)
1999	→ Padova (loan)	28	(5)
1999–2000	→ Alzano Virescit (loan)	28	(1)
2000–2002	Chievo	47	(4)
2002–2004	Parma	62	(4)
2004–2006	Palermo	71	(5)
2006–2009	Torino	82	(2)
2009–2010	Cagliari	16	(0)
2011–2012	Livorno	20	(2)
Total		356	(23)

International career
2004–2006	Italy	15	(1)

Managerial career
- 2016: Delhi Dynamos (assistant)
- 2017–2018: Juventus Youth Team
- 2018–2021: Sassuolo Youth Team
- 2021: Correggese
Medal record
Men's football
Representing Italy
FIFA World Cup
Winner	2006 Germany
- * Club domestic league appearances and goals

Simone Barone Ufficiale OMRI (Italian pronunciation: [siˈmoːne baˈroːne]; born 30 April 1978) is an Italian football manager and former player, who played as a midfielder. He played for several Italian clubs throughout his career, before coming to prominence with Palermo. At international level, he was part of the Italian side that won the 2006 FIFA World Cup, and represented the national side on 16 occasions between 2004 and 2006, scoring once.

== Club career ==
Barone started his career making his first team debut on 4 May 1997 for Parma, against Atalanta. He then played for Padova of Serie C1 in 1998, Alzano Virescit of Serie B in 1999.

In summer 2000, he joined Chievo in a co-ownership deal, where he played for 2 seasons. He was loaned back to Parma in the 2002–03 season, then bought back permanently in 2003, with Amauri moved to Chievo.

On 16 July 2004, he transferred to Palermo for €5M. He signed a 4-year contract. He was the regular of the team, and the team qualified for 2006–07 UEFA Cup (after the Calciopoli trials).

On 5 August 2006, Simone moved to Serie A newcomer Torino after the club signed Mark Bresciano and Fábio Simplício from Parma. He played 3 seasons for the Serie A struggler and left the club after relegated in 2009.

On 6 August 2009, he was signed by Serie A side Cagliari. He was mainly used as a substitute, however, only playing 5 times as a starter, as a right midfielder on each occasion.

== International career ==
Barone debuted for the Italy national football team on 18 February 2004, in a 2–2 friendly tie against Czech Republic in Palermo. Stefano Bettarini and Sergio Volpi also received their first call-up and made their debut under manager Giovanni Trapattoni during the match. He was part of Italy's 2006 FIFA World Cup squad, under Marcello Lippi, appearing two times as a substitute as Italy went on to win the tournament. In Italy's final group match of the competition, a 2–0 win against the Czech Republic on 22 June, Barone helped to win back possession in midfield before laying the ball off to Simone Perrotta, who subsequently set up Filippo Inzaghi with a one on one opportunity with a throughball after the striker had managed to beat the offside trap; Inzaghi went on to score after rounding Czech goalkeeper Petr Čech, while Barone also followed Inzaghi's run to provide him with an additional attacking option across goal. This play is such iconic in Italian culture that, as Inzaghi completely ignored Barone’s 50-metre run, youngsters use the expression “utile come la corsa di Barone” (Italian for “as useful as Barone’s run”) to indicate something superfluous or unnecessary. He later also appeared in Italy's 3–0 win over Ukraine in the quarter-finals of the tournament. In total, Barone made 16 appearances for Italy between 2004 and 2006, scoring his only international goal on 9 February 2005, in a 2–0 friendly home win over Russia, in Cagliari, at the stadio Sant'Elia.

== Style of play ==
A versatile, consistent, energetic, and hard-working player, Barone was primarily deployed as a central or right sided midfielder, although he was capable of playing in any midfield position, and was also deployed as a defensive midfielder, due to his stamina, tactical intelligence, positional sense, and decision-making, as well as his ability to break down opposition plays and subsequently start attacking moves with his passing.

== Managerial career ==
In late June 2016, Barone was appointed assistant manager for Indian Super League club Delhi Dynamos, under his former international teammate Gianluca Zambrotta.

In the 2017–18 season, he was appointed manager for the Juventus academy.

He took over the Sassuolo Primavera team for the 2018–19 season.

On 7 July 2021, he was hired as a head coach of Correggese in Serie D. However, he left the club before the league season started.

== Career statistics ==
=== International ===
Italy senior team
Year	Apps	Goals
2004	2	0
2005	9	1
2006	4	0
Total	15	1

==== International goal ====
#	Date	Venue	Opponent	Score	Result	Competition
1	9 February 2005	Stadio Sant'Elia, Cagliari, Italy	Russia	2–0	2–0	Friendly

== Honours ==
=== International ===
Italy

- FIFA World Cup: 2006

=== Orders ===
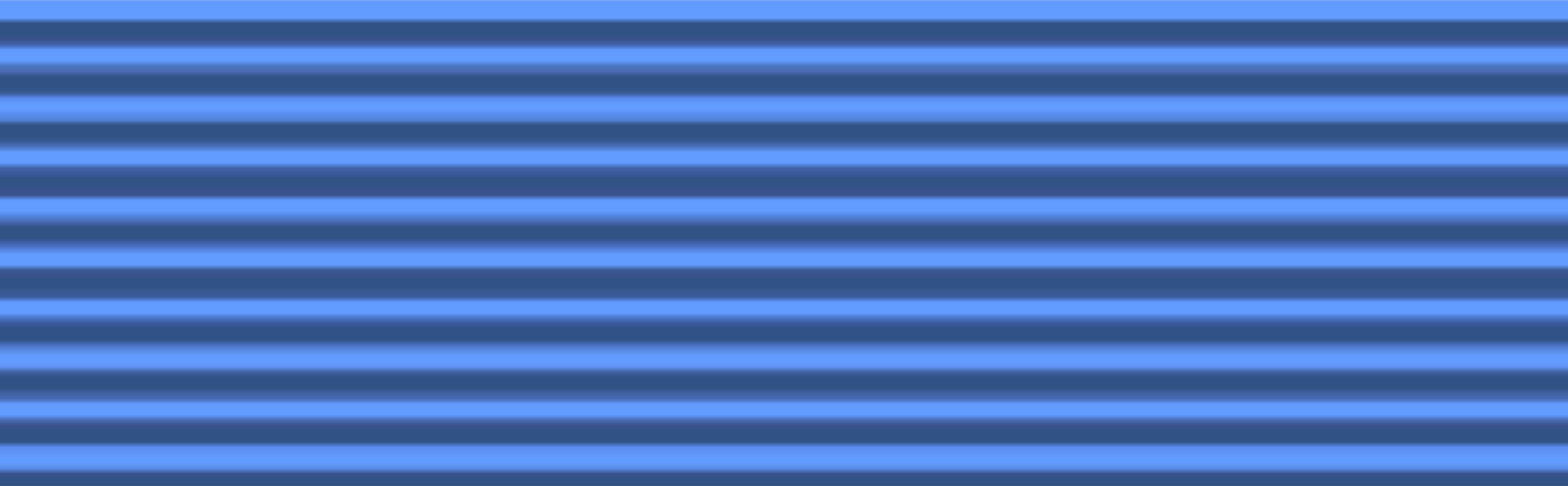
- CONI: Golden Collar of Sports Merit: Collare d'Oro al Merito Sportivo: 2006

- 4th Class / Officer: Ufficiale Ordine al Merito della Repubblica Italiana: 2006
