= Sid-Ahmed Bouziane =

French footballer (born 1983)

Personal information
- Date of birth: 18 July 1983 (age 43)
- Place of birth: Quetigny, Dijon, France
- Height: 1.74 m (5 ft 9 in)
- Position: Midfielder

Team information
- Current team: ASPTT Dijon

Youth career
- Sampdoria

Senior career*
Years	Team	Apps	(Gls)
2002–2003	Sampdoria	1	(0)
2003–2004	Solbiatese Arno	15	(1)
2004	Chiasso	4	(0)
2005–2007	La Chaux-de-Fonds	70	(26)
2007–2009	Servette	23	(2)
2010	Thun	12	(6)
2010–2011	Yverdon-Sport	18	(4)
2011–2012	Delémont	17	(2)
2012–2014	Le Mont	6	(2)
2014–2015	Köniz	6	(0)
2019–	ASPTT Dijon	15	(1)
- * Club domestic league appearances and goals as of 7 December 2024

Sid-Ahmed Bouziane (born 18 July 1983) is a French footballer who plays for Championnat National 3 club ASPTT Dijon.

== Personal life ==
Born in France, Bouziane is of Algerian descent. After his footballing career, he worked as a dentist in Switzerland.
