= Alessandro Romeo =

Italian footballer (born 1987)

Personal information
- Date of birth: 19 January 1987 (age 39)
- Place of birth: Rome, Italy
- Height: 1.87 m (6 ft 2 in)
- Position: Striker

Team information
- Current team: Trapani
- Number: 15

Youth career
- –2003: Lodigiani
- 2004–2006: Sampdoria

Senior career*
Years	Team	Apps	(Gls)
2006–2008	Sampdoria	4	(0)
2007–2008	→ Legnano (loan)	12	(4)
2008	Legnano	8	(1)
2009	Cavese	11	(1)
2009–2011	Ascoli	21	(5)
2011	Sampdoria	0	(0)
2011–2012	→ Ascoli (loan)	16	(1)
2012–	Trapani	10	(0)
- * Club domestic league appearances and goals as of 7 August 2013

Alessandro Romeo (born 19 January 1987) is an Italian footballer who plays for Trapani.
