= Andrea Rabito =

Italian footballer (born 1980)

Personal information
- Date of birth: 11 May 1980 (age 46)
- Place of birth: Vicenza, Italy
- Height: 1.78 m (5 ft 10 in)
- Position: Forward

Youth career
- Milan

Senior career*
Years	Team	Apps	(Gls)
1999–2006	Milan	0	(0)
2000–2001	→ Reggiana (loan)	30	(11)
2001–2002	→ Modena (loan)	26	(8)
2002–2003	→ Sampdoria (loan)	21	(1)
2003–2004	→ Livorno (loan)	23	(1)
2004–2005	→ Ternana (loan)	20	(1)
2005–2006	→ Rimini (loan)	23	(2)
2006–2007	AlbinoLeffe	26	(3)
2007–2011	Padova	116	(26)
2011–2012	Cremonese	19	(3)

International career
1998	Italy U-18	3	(1)
1998	Italy U-19	2	(0)
- * Club domestic league appearances and goals

Andrea Rabito (born 11 May 1980) is an Italian former footballer who played as a forward.

== Career ==
Born in Vicenza, Veneto region, Rabito was a youth product of Lombard team A.C. Milan. He was loaned to Serie C1 club Reggiana in 2000–01 and Serie B club Modena in 2001–02, along with Maurizio Domizzi. On 21 June 2002 Rabito and Domizzi were sold to second division club Sampdoria in co-ownership deal for 2,005 million lire (€1.035 million) each. In June 2003 Milan bought back Rabito for undisclosed fee as well as sold Domizzi outright for another €4 million. However Rabito was signed by AlbinoLeffe in 2006 for a €1,000, which after 3 years of amortization, he still had a residual contract value of €957,000 on 15 July on Milan's balance sheet.

In 2001–02, 2002–03 and 2003–04 seasons he won promotion to Serie A with his clubs (but each time transferred to another team before the next season, not getting any top-level experience). For the next few seasons his teams did not have much success.

In 2007, he was signed by Padova in another co-ownership deal for €15,000. In June 2008 Padova acquired him outright for another €45,000.

In the 2008–09 season, he scored a hat-trick in the first game of the season and ended the season second-best Calcio Padova scorer with 9 goals, contributing significantly to Padova getting a promotion to Serie B.

In 2011, he was signed by Cremonese.
