= Alessandro Parisi (footballer, born 1977) =

Italian footballer (born 1977)

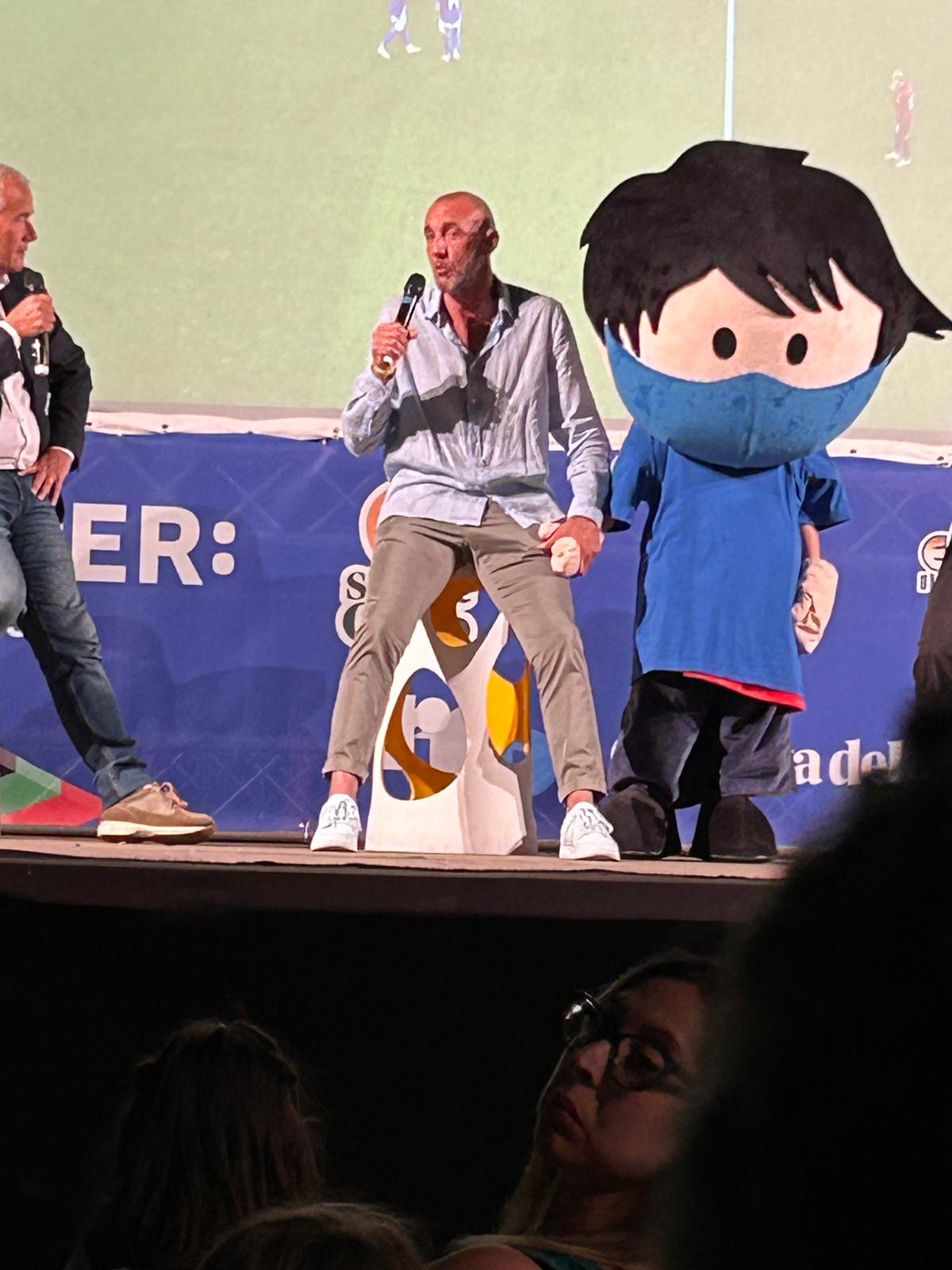
- Parisi (right) in Messina in 2024.

Personal information
- Date of birth: 15 April 1977 (age 49)
- Place of birth: Palermo, Italy
- Height: 1.84 m (6 ft 0 in)
- Position: Left back

Team information
- Current team: Messina (head coach)

Senior career*
Years	Team	Apps	(Gls)
1995–1996	Palermo	1	(0)
1996–1997	Trapani	12	(1)
1997–1998	Palermo	10	(0)
1998–2000	Reggiana	47	(3)
2000–2003	Triestina	89	(13)
2003–2008	Messina	142	(25)
2008–2011	Bari	69	(5)
2011–2012	Torino	33	(1)

International career
2004	Italy	1	(0)

Managerial career
- 2026–: Messina
- * Club domestic league appearances and goals

Alessandro Parisi (Italian pronunciation: [alesˈsandro paˈriːzi]; born 15 April 1977) is an Italian former footballer who played as a left-back, currently in charge as head coach of Serie D club Messina.

== Club career ==
Parisi initially played for the Sicilian clubs Palermo, Trapani, and Messina for 8 seasons. He also played 5 seasons on the Italian peninsula. He scored 14 goals in Serie B for Messina in the 2003–04 season. He made his Serie A debut the following season, on 12 September 2004, against Parma F.C. He remained with the club until the conclusion of the 2007–08 Serie B season.

== International career ==
Parisi made his international debut and only appearance for Italy on 17 November 2004, starting in a 1–0 friendly victory over Finland in Messina.

== Coaching career ==
After retiring, Parisi returned to Messina, joining the club in a variety of positions, mostly as a youth coach.

On 14 January 2026, Parisi was promoted to head coach of Messina's first team in the Serie D.
