= Carmine Cucciniello =

Italian football player (born 1988)

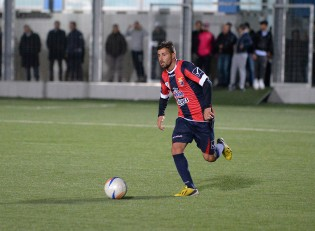

Personal information
- Date of birth: 27 December 1988 (age 37)
- Place of birth: Avellino, Italy
- Height: 1.71 m (5 ft 7 1/2 in)
- Position: Midfielder

Team information
- Current team: Arezzo

Youth career
- 200?–2006: Avellino
- 2007: → Sampdoria

Senior career*
Years	Team	Apps	(Gls)
2006–2007	Avellino	2	(0)
2007–2010	Sampdoria	0	(0)
2008–2009	→ Perugia (loan)	2	(0)
2009–2010	→ Paganese (loan)	42	(1)
2010–2013	Fondi	65	(6)
2013–2014	Casertana	22	(1)
2014–	Arezzo	27	(2)
- * Club domestic league appearances and goals

Carmine Cucciniello (born 27 December 1988) is an Italian football player. He currently plays for Arezzo.

== Club career ==
=== Early career ===
Cucciniello was born in Avellino on 27 December 1988 and started playing football in the youth team of Avellino, the club of his hometown. He went on to make his professional debut, aged 17, as a starter in a Coppa Italia game against Albinoleffe, on 19 August 2006.

=== Sampdoria ===
During the January 2007 transfer window, Serie A club Sampdoria signed Cucciniello in a temporary deal, with option to buy at the end of the season. At the beginning of the 2007–08 campaign, Cucciniello was bought by Sampdoria and during that season he won, with the Primavera team, which is now an under-19 team, a Scudetto Primavera. He never made his first team and Serie A debut with Samp, but he was sent on loan in lower Italian division teams to improve, such as Perugia.

=== Loans ===
Cucciniello was sent for the 2008/09 season on a temporary deal to Perugia, but he didn't have a lot of luck, because of his young age. For this reason, during the January 2009 transfer window he was sent on another loan to Paganese, closer to his hometown. He stayed to Paganese for the season 2009/10, too.

=== Fondi ===
At the beginning of 2010/2011 season Cucciniello signed a 3-year contract with Fondi, after his contract with Sampdoria had expired.

=== Casertana ===
For the season 2013/14 Carmine Cucciniello played for Casertana. At the end of the season his team was admitted in Lega Pro Prima Divisione after a second place in Lega Pro Seconda Divisione.

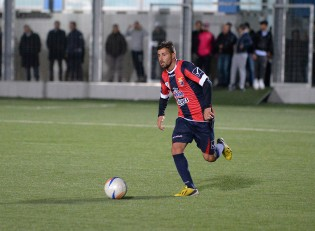
Cucciniello in Casertana in 2013

=== Arezzo ===
For the season 2014/15 Cucciniello signed for Arezzo.
