= Daniele Padelli =

Italian footballer (born 1985)

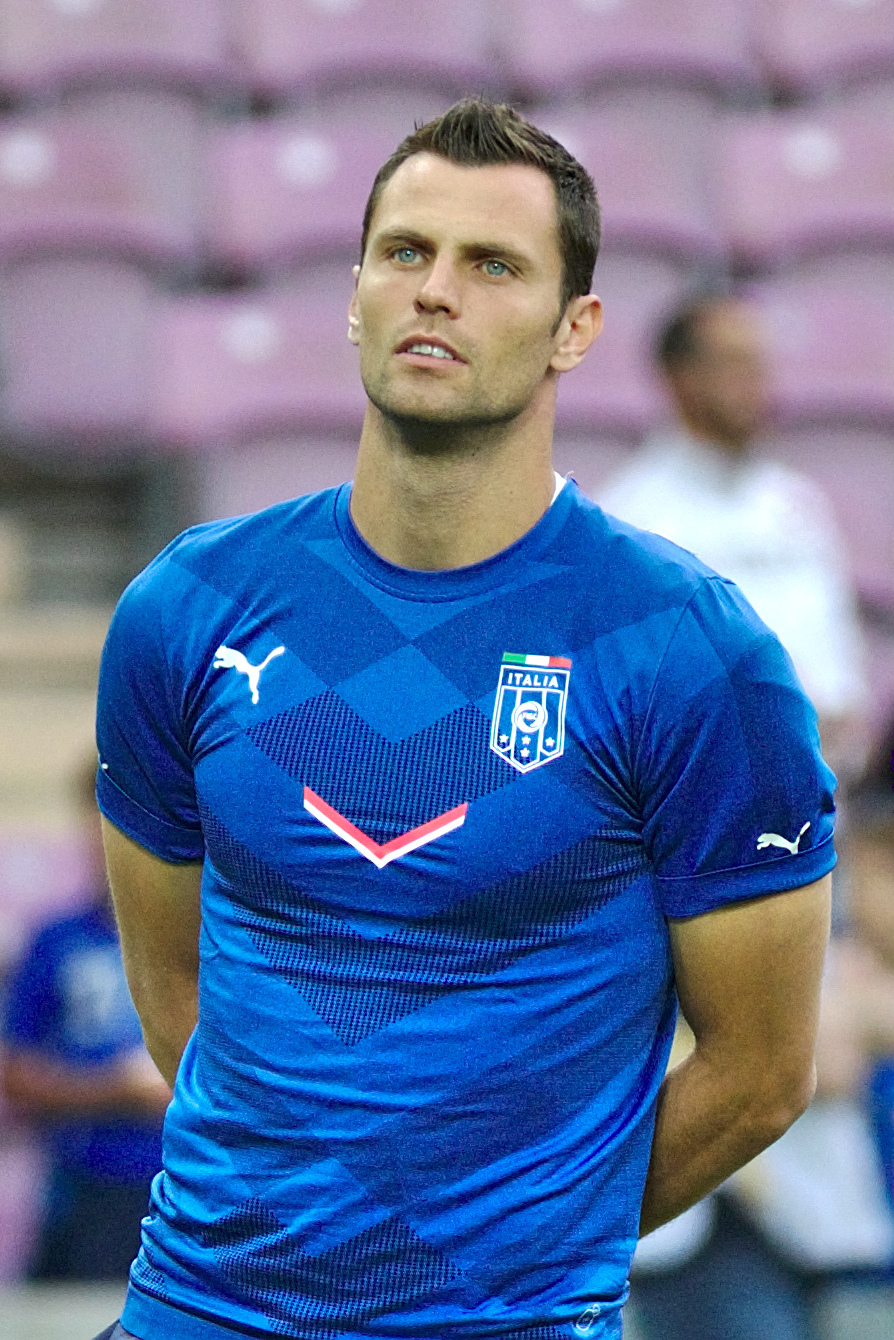
- Padelli with Italy in 2015

Personal information
- Date of birth: 25 October 1985 (age 41)
- Place of birth: Lecco, Italy
- Height: 1.91 m (6 ft 3 in)
- Position: Goalkeeper

Team information
- Current team: Udinese
- Number: 93

Youth career
- 2001–2002: Lecco
- 2002–2004: Como

Senior career*
Years	Team	Apps	(Gls)
2003–2004	Como	0	(0)
2004–2012	Sampdoria	0	(0)
2005–2006	→ Pizzighettone (loan)	33	(0)
2006–2007	→ Crotone (loan)	1	(0)
2007	→ Liverpool (loan)	1	(0)
2008–2009	→ Pisa (loan)	7	(0)
2008–2009	→ Avellino (loan)	15	(0)
2009–2011	→ Bari (loan)	3	(0)
2011–2012	→ Udinese (loan)	0	(0)
2012–2013	Udinese	9	(0)
2013–2017	Torino	100	(0)
2017–2021	Inter Milan	4	(0)
2021–	Udinese	6	(0)

International career
2005–2007	Italy U20	7	(0)
2006	Italy U21	1	(0)
- * Club domestic league appearances and goals as of 25 May 2026

Daniele Padelli (born 25 October 1985) is an Italian professional footballer who plays as a goalkeeper for Serie A club Udinese.

== Club career ==
=== Early career ===
Padelli began his playing career at the Seconda Categoria club Delebio, a team from Valtellina. He moved to Lecco in 2001 and then Como the year after. In 2004, he was transferred to Sampdoria, playing for the Primavera youth team, before being loaned to Pizzighettone in the Serie C1 (33 appearances with 29 goals conceded) and then Crotone (one appearance, 2 goals conceded).

==== Liverpool (loan) ====
On 12 January 2007, Padelli was loaned to Premier League club Liverpool for the duration of the season with the option to make the deal permanent. On the completion of the deal Liverpool manager Rafael Benítez said, "He's a good young goalkeeper who has been selected for his national side. Padelli will give us a good option for the future. The fact he is once again with the under-21s for his national side tells you that we are signing a very good player." He made his debut, and only appearance, for the club on 13 May 2007 against Charlton Athletic F.C. in the last league game of the 2006–07 season to become the first Italian to ever play for the club. However, his poor performance saw him concede two goals in a disappointing draw for the Reds. He returned to Sampdoria on 8 June 2007.

==== Pisa (loan) ====
On 5 July 2007 he was officially loaned to Pisa in Serie B, playing several friendly matches for the side as well as making an appearance in the Coppa Italia against Napoli. In the first league game he was left on the bench, playing in the fourth round (0–3) against Brescia; in the following game, coach Giampiero Ventura selected him over the more experienced Davide Morello. However, his season ended with only 7 appearances with 10 goals conceded. In 2008–09, he was loaned to Avellino with the option to make the deal permanent. With the biancoverdi, he collected 15 appearances with 29 goals conceded, relegating to Lega Pro Prima Divisione at the end of the season. He returned to Sampdoria.

==== Bari (loan) ====
On 2 July 2009 he was transferred from the Genoese club on loan to Bari with a buyout clause, where he served as deputy to Jean-François Gillet. He made his debut in Serie A and with Bari on 9 May 2010 in the match Udinese-Bari (3–3). On 29 July 2010 his loan was renewed, with Padelli playing his first game of the 2010–11 season in a 1–1 draw with Palermo.

=== Udinese ===
On 25 June 2011 Padelli returned to Sampdoria, but on 31 August it was announced he had been loaned to Udinese with the option to redeem 50% of his contract in co-ownership. On 27 August 2012, he was sold outright to Udinese, where he spent a season as second-choice goalkeeper, playing 12 times in all competitions.

=== Torino ===
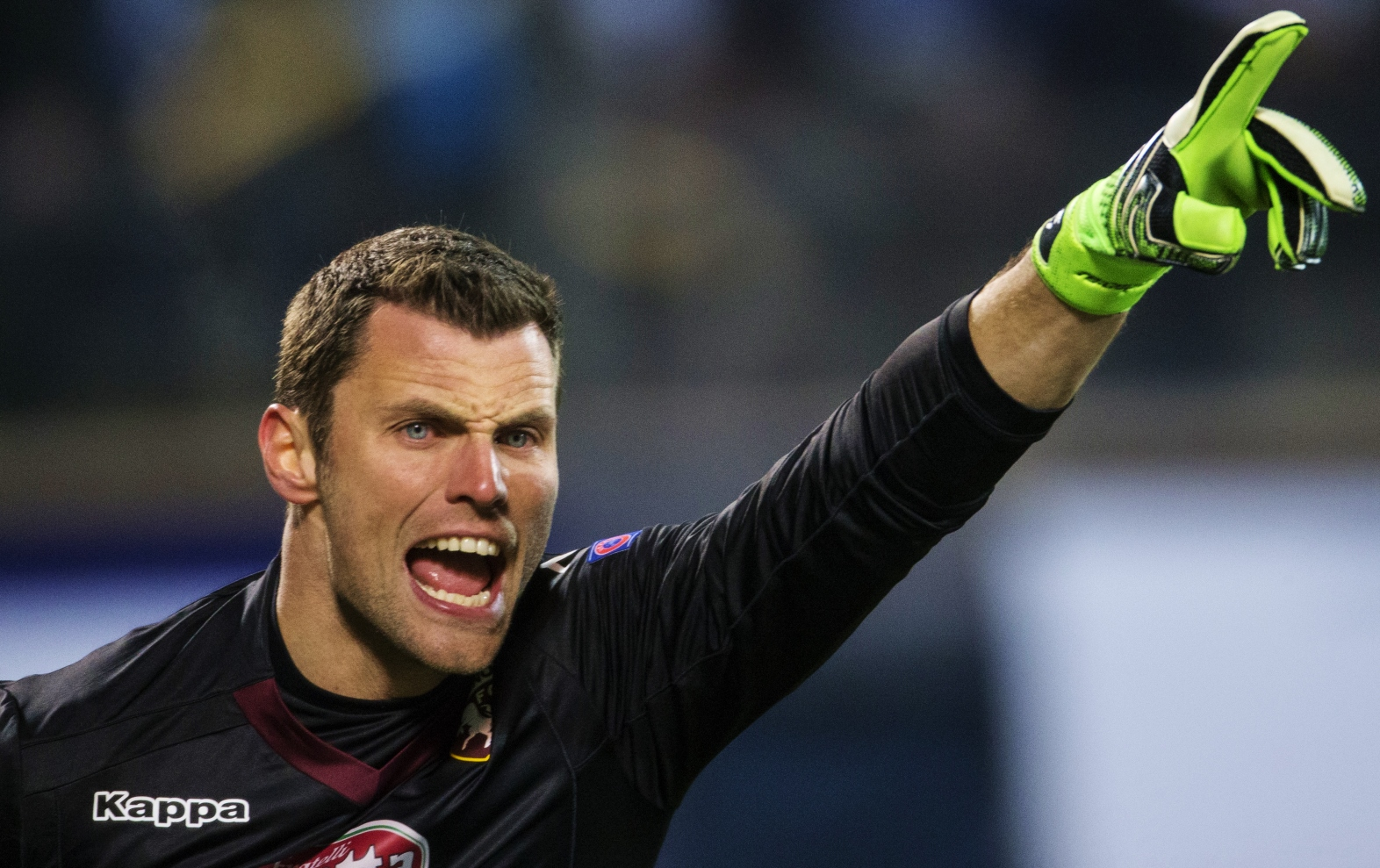
Padelli at Torino in 2015

On 29 May 2013 Padelli was signed by Torino on a free transfer, where, due to the suspension of Gillet, he was a starter. He debuted in the third round of Coppa Italia and conceded twice in a 1–2 loss to Pescara. Padelli played in every match of the 2013–14 season, which concluded with Torino's qualification to the Europa League, collecting 38 appearances.

He was awarded the goalkeeping revelation of the season at the Italian Sport Awards on 21 May 2014. He made his official debut in European competition for Torino during the third round of the 2014–15 Europa League against Sweden's Brommapojkarna.

After the arrival of Joe Hart from Manchester City, Padelli lost his position in the starting lineup, and finished the season with the expiration of his contract. He concluded his experience at Torino after four seasons and 116 appearances between the league, Coppa Italia and Europa League.

=== Inter Milan ===
Padelli, who has always been an Inter Milan fan, was signed by the Nerazzurri in mid-2017. It was reported that Padelli already agreed to a deal in May in order to formally join the club as a free agent on 1 July. Padelli and his goalkeeping team mate Tommaso Berni signed a new 1-year contract on 28 June 2019.

On 2 February 2020, Padelli made his first Serie A appearance for Inter in an away match against Udinese, keeping a clean-sheet in a 2–0 win at Dacia Arena. Padelli became the first choice goalkeeper due to the injury of Samir Handanović. The following season, he won his first silverware under Antonio Conte. However, with the return from loan of Romanian sub-21 international Ionuț Radu, Padelli was relegated to third-choice goalkeeper.

=== Return to Udinese ===
On 28 May 2021, Padelli returned to Udinese on a free transfer.

== International career ==
Padelli was called up to the Italy under-20 on 14 occasions and played 7 times. On 12 December 2006 he made his debut for the Italy under-21 against Luxembourg, won 2–0 by the Azzurrini.

On 30 August 2014 he was called up to the Italy national team for the first time by the new coach Antonio Conte in view of a friendly against the Netherlands on 4 September and the Euro 2016 qualifying match against Norway on 9 September.

== Style of play ==
Padelli is known for his good-quality shot-stopping ability as a goalkeeper.

== Career statistics ==
=== Club ===
As of match played 3 January 2026.

Appearances and goals by club, season and competition
Club	Season	League			Cup		Europe		Total	
Club	Season	Division	Apps	Goals	Apps	Goals	Apps	Goals	Apps	Goals
Como	2003–04	Serie B	0	0	0	0	—		0	0
Sampdoria	2004–05	Serie A	0	0	0	0	—		0	0
Pizzighettone (loan)	2005–06	Serie C1	33	0	1	0	—		34	0
Crotone (loan)	2006–07	Serie B	1	0	1	0	—		2	0
Liverpool (loan)	2006–07	Premier League	1	0	0	0	0	0	1	0
Pisa (loan)	2007–08	Serie B	7	0	1	0	—		8	0
Bari (loan)	2009–10	Serie A	1	0	0	0	—		1	0
Bari (loan)	2010–11	Serie A	2	0	3	0	—		5	0
Bari (loan)	Total		3	0	3	0	—		6	0
Udinese	2011–12	Serie A	0	0	0	0	0	0	0	0
Udinese	2012–13	Serie A	9	0	1	0	2 (Note: All appearances in UEFA Europa League)	0	12	0
Udinese	Total		9	0	1	0	2	0	12	0
Torino	2013–14	Serie A	38	0	1	0	—		39	0
Torino	2014–15	Serie A	25	0	1	0	12	0	38	0
Torino	2015–16	Serie A	35	0	0	0	—		35	0
Torino	2016–17	Serie A	2	0	2	0	—		4	0
Torino	Total		100	0	4	0	12	0	116	0
Inter Milan	2017–18	Serie A	0	0	1	0	—		1	0
Inter Milan	2018–19	Serie A	0	0	1	0	0	0	1	0
Inter Milan	2019–20	Serie A	3	0	1	0	2	0	6	0
Inter Milan	2020–21	Serie A	1	0	0	0	0	0	1	0
Inter Milan	Total		4	0	3	0	2	0	9	0
Udinese	2021–22	Serie A	3	0	1	0	—		4	0
Udinese	2022–23	Serie A	0	0	1	0	—		1	0
Udinese	2023–24	Serie A	0	0	0	0	—		0	0
Udinese	2024–25	Serie A	1	0	0	0	—		1	0
Udinese	2025–26	Serie A	2	0	0	0	—		2	0
Udinese	2026–27	Serie A	0	0	0	0	—		0	0
Udinese	Total		6	0	2	0	—		8	0
Career total			178	0	16	0	16	0	210	0

== Honours ==
Liverpool

- UEFA Champions League runner-up: 2006–07

Inter Milan

- Serie A: 2020–21
- UEFA Europa League runner-up: 2019–20
