= Claudio Costanzo =

Italian footballer (born 1985)

Personal information
- Full name: Claudio Costanzo
- Date of birth: July 3, 1985 (age 41)
- Place of birth: Frattamaggiore, Italy
- Height: 1.77 m (5 ft 10 in)
- Position: Midfielder

Team information
- Current team: Isola Liri

Senior career*
Years	Team	Apps	(Gls)
2003–04	Sampdoria	0	(0)
2004–05	Ascoli	4	(0)
2005–06	Chieti	14	(1)
2006–07	Cisco Roma	28	(3)
2008	Viterbese	8	(1)
2008–09	Cisco Roma	10	(1)
2009–	Isola Liri	23	(0)
- * Club domestic league appearances and goals as of 12:35, 29 April 2010 (UTC)

Claudio Costanzo (born 3 July 1985) is an Italian footballer. He plays as a midfielder. He is currently playing for A.C. Isola Liri.
