= Francesco Pedone =

Italian footballer

Personal information
- Date of birth: 6 June 1968 (age 58)
- Place of birth: Milan, Italy
- Height: 1.76 m (5 ft 9 in)
- Position: Midfielder

Youth career
- Como

Senior career*
Years	Team	Apps	(Gls)
1987–1988	Como	0	(0)
1988–1989	Centese	34	(6)
1989–1990	Barletta	34	(1)
1990–1993	Como	84	(6)
1993–1996	Bari	102	(10)
1996	Reggiana	14	(0)
1997–2001	Venezia	147	(10)
2001–2002	Como	33	(3)
2002–2004	Sampdoria	33	(2)
Total		481	(38)

Managerial career
- 2004–2007: Sampdoria (assistant)
- 2007–2009: Torino (assistant)
- 2009: Reggina (assistant)
- 2010–2011: Sampdoria (assistant)
- 2011–2017: Sampdoria (youth)
- 2013: Sampdoria (caretaker)
- 2017–2022: Juventus (youth)
- 2022–2024: Sassuolo (youth)
- 2024–: Sampdoria (youth)
- * Club domestic league appearances and goals

Francesco Pedone (born 6 June 1968) is an Italian football coach and former player. He played as a midfielder.

== Career ==
Revealed in Como's youth categories, Pedone became famous playing for the club, where he was champion of the 2001–02 Serie B. He also stood out for Bari, where in 1994–95, he played for the first time in Serie A, and for Venezia where he scored 147 appearances. He ended his career with Sampdoria in 2004.

After retiring, Pedone joined Sampdoria coaching staff alongside coach Walter Novellino. He repeated the partnership at Torino, at Reggina and again at Sampdoria, when in 2013 Pedone became coach of the club's youth teams. In November 2013, Pedone was caretaker coach of Sampdoria first team after Delio Rossi was sacked. He also coached the youth sectors of Juventus and Sassuolo, where he won the traditional Torneo di Viareggio in 2023.

== Honours ==
=== Player ===
Como

- Serie B: 2001–02

=== Manager ===
Juventus U17

- Future Cup: 2019

Sassuolo U18

- Torneo di Viareggio: 2023
