= Mirko Conte =

Italian footballer and coach

Personal information
- Date of birth: 12 August 1974 (age 52)
- Place of birth: Tradate, Italy
- Height: 1.80 m (5 ft 11 in)
- Position: Defender

Senior career*
Years	Team	Apps	(Gls)
1992–1995	Inter Milan	20	(0)
1993–1994	→ Venezia (loan)	31	(0)
1995–1997	Piacenza	54	(1)
1997–1998	Napoli	9	(0)
1998–2000	Vicenza	49	(0)
2000–2004	Sampdoria	116	(3)
2004	Messina	6	(0)
2005–2009	Arezzo	126	(0)
2010–2011	Colligiana	7	(0)

Managerial career
- 2024–2025: Turris
- 2025: Sorrento
- * Club domestic league appearances and goals as of 9 October 2024

Mirko Conte (born 12 August 1974) is an Italian professional football coach and former player.

== Managerial career ==
On 22 August 2020, Conte was appointed assistant coach of Serie C club Juventus U23, the reserve team of Juventus. He left his role in July 2024 to become head coach of fellow Serie C club Turris. He stayed on at Turris until the club was excluded due to financial issues before the end of the 2024–25 Serie C season.

On 14 June 2025, Sorrento announced the signing of Conte as their new head coach for the club's upcoming 2025–26 Serie C campaign. He was dismissed on 18 November 2025.
