= Corrado Colombo =

Italian footballer (born 1979)

Personal information
- Full name: Corrado Mario Colombo
- Date of birth: 3 August 1979 (age 47)
- Place of birth: Vimercate, Italy
- Height: 1.87 m (6 ft 1 1/2 in)
- Position: Striker

Youth career
- 1996–1998: Atalanta

Senior career*
Years	Team	Apps	(Gls)
1998–2000	Atalanta	20	(3)
1999–2000	→ Pistoiese (loan)	26	(2)
2000–2001	Internazionale	1	(0)
2000–2001	→ Torino (loan)	21	(2)
2001–2002	Atalanta	22	(1)
2002–2006	Sampdoria	40	(3)
2004	→ Piacenza (loan)	23	(3)
2004–2005	→ Livorno (loan)	19	(3)
2005	→ Ascoli (loan)	6	(0)
2006–2007	Brescia	18	(0)
2007–2008	Spezia	34	(8)
2008	Pisa	12	(2)
2008–2009	Bari	16	(3)
2009–2010	Verona	23	(3)
2010–2011	Spezia	27	(3)
2011	Pistoiese	7	(1)
2012–2025	Tuttocuoio		
2016–2017	Pistoiese	49	(12)
2017–2018	Quarrata		

International career
1999–2001	Italy U-21	9	(2)
- * Club domestic league appearances and goals

Corrado Mario Colombo (born 3 August 1979) is an Italian former footballer who played as a striker.

== Club career ==
=== Atalanta, Inter and loans ===
Colombo started his career at the famous youth rank of Atalanta. He made his debut on Serie B and for the club in the 1998–99 season, and then joined Pistoiese (Serie B). He was signed by the giant Internazionale in the summer of 2000 in co-ownership deal. He made his Serie A debut on 1 October 2000 against Reggina Calcio, and four other appearances at Coppa Italia, Italian Super Cup and the UEFA Cup match, in which he scored.

In October, he was on loan to Torino Calcio (Serie B) along with Sixto Peralta, due to there being too many strikers on the squad.

He failed to return to Inter but was sold back to Atalanta, this time in the Serie A.

His first-ever Serie A season as a regular was fair, in which he made 22 appearances.

=== Sampdoria and loans ===
In summer 2002, Sampdoria (Serie B) signed Colombo in a co-ownership deal, for 5.25 billion lire (€2,711,399). He is one of the players who helped the club to be promoted, by playing 27 games.

But his third Serie A season with his third Serie A club was bitter; he made just 2 appearances before the winter break.

Colombo was loaned to Piacenza (Serie B), Livorno (Serie A), and Ascoli (Serie A), for exactly two seasons. The latter two were newcomers to the Serie A at that time, and Piacenza was also new to Serie B since being relegated.

He returned to Sampdoria in January 2006, due to injuries of Emiliano Bonazzoli, when he made 12 appearances, without a goal.

=== Brescia, Spezia and Pisa ===
In June 2006, Atalanta gave up the remaining registration rights of Colombo to Sampdoria for free, while the "Blue-Black" also forced to sell Biagio Pagano to Sampdoria after no agreement was formed and a lower bid thereafter. But it saw Colombo sent to Brescia (Serie B) in a co-ownership deal on 29 August 2006, for a peppercorn fee of €500. Like previous times, he failed to score regularly.

On 29 January 2007, Spezia (Serie B) signed Colombo, from Brescia, with Sampdoria retaining 50% registration rights, as an emergency signing. He finally scored regularly, scoring 8 goals in 18 games, which kept the place of Serie B for Spezia.

He then transferred to Pisa Calcio in January 2008. Pisa paid €200,000 to Spezia to acquire its portion of registration rights. In June 2008, Sampdoria gave up the remaining 50% registration rights to Pisa for free.

=== Bari, Verona and Spezia ===
On 1 September 2008, he was signed by Bari in a 2-year contract. On 31 August 2009, he signed a 2-year contract with Verona, after rule out from Bari first team. In August 2010, Colombo was released. Two days later Colombo was re-signed by Spezia.

=== Serie D ===
On 25 August 2011, Colombo was signed by Serie D club U.S. Pistoiese 1921. However, after only 1 goal in 7 games, he was released.

== International career ==
Colombo was a member of the Italy national under-21 football team.

== Career statistics ==
=== Club ===
Club performance			League		Cup		Continental		Total	
Season	Club	League	Apps	Goals	Apps	Goals	Apps	Goals	Apps	Goals
Italy			League		Coppa Italia		Europe		Total	
1998–99	Atalanta	Serie B	20	3	?	?			?	?
1999–2000	Pistoiese	Serie B	26	2	?	?			?	?
2000–01	Internazionale	Serie A	1	0	2	0	1	1	5^{1}	1
2000–01	Torino	Serie B	22	2					22	2
2001–02	Atalanta	Serie A	22	1	?	?			?	?
2002–03	Sampdoria	Serie B	27	3	?	?			?	?
2003–04	Sampdoria	Serie A	2	0	?	?			?	?
2003–04	Piacenza	Serie B	23	4					?	?
2004–05	Livorno	Serie A	19	3	?	?			?	?
2005–06	Ascoli	Serie A	6	0	0	0			6	0
2005–06	Sampdoria	Serie A	12	0	3	2			15	2
2006–07	Brescia	Serie B	18	0	1	1			19	1
2006–07	Spezia	Serie B	17	8					18^{2}	8
2007–08	Spezia	Serie B	17	1	1	1			18	1
2007–08	Pisa	Serie B	11	1					13^{3}	2
2008–09	Pisa	Serie B	1	1	1	1			2	1
2008–09	Bari	Serie B	16	3					16	3
2009–10	Verona	Prima Divisione	23	3	2^{4}	1			29	4
2010–11	Spezia	Prima Divisione	27	3	0	0			27	3
2011–12	Pistoiese	Serie D	7	1	0	0			7	1
2011–12	Tuttocuoio	Serie D								
Career total			317	39	?	?	1	1	?	?

^{1}Include one match at 2000 Supercoppa Italiana.
^{2}Include one match at Relegation play-off.
^{3}Include two matches and one goals at Relegation play-off
^{4}All in 2009–10 Coppa Italia Lega Pro
^{5}Include four matches in Promotion play-off

== Honours ==
Inter

- Supercoppa Italiana (Runner-up): 2000

Torino

- Serie B: 2000–01

Bari

- Serie B: 2008–09
