= Stefano Bettarini =

Italian footballer (born 1972)

Personal information
- Date of birth: 6 February 1972 (age 54)
- Place of birth: Forlì, Italy
- Height: 1.80 m (5 ft 11 in)
- Position: Left-back

Youth career
- Staggia Senese
- 1990–1991: Internazionale

Senior career*
Years	Team	Apps	(Gls)
1991–1992	Internazionale	0	(0)
1991–1992	→ Baracca Lugo (loan)	24	(2)
1992–1994	Lucchese	28	(0)
1994–1995	Salernitana	5	(0)
1995–1996	Lucchese	34	(2)
1996–1997	Cagliari	32	(0)
1997–1999	Fiorentina	18	(0)
1999	→ Bologna (loan)	14	(1)
1999–2002	Venezia	82	(7)
2002–2004	Sampdoria	58	(2)
2005	Parma	8	(0)
2010	Chievo	0	(0)
Total		303	(14)

International career
2004	Italy	1	(0)
- * Club domestic league appearances and goals

Stefano Bettarini (Italian pronunciation: [ˈsteːfano bettaˈriːni]; born 6 February 1972) is an Italian retired professional footballer who played as a defender, and a television personality. He played once for the Italy national team. He was a contestant on Grande Fratello VIP, 2016 and currently a host presenter in L'Isola dei Famosi.

== Club career ==
=== Early career ===
Born in Forlì comune, Emilia-Romagna, Bettarini spent his childhood at Buonconvento comune, in the Province of Siena, Tuscany. He then spent his youth career at a local side of Staggia Senese, a village in Poggibonsi, in the Province of Siena. He was signed by Internazionale in 1990. After first being loaned to Baracca Lugo, Bettarini joined Serie B side Lucchese and played four successive Serie B seasons, including one at Salerno. In June 1996, he was signed by Serie A side Cagliari but the team were relegated in 1997.

=== Fiorentina ===
In July 1997, he was signed by Fiorentina and priced at 3 billion Italian lire. After a limited chance, he was loaned to Bologna on 30 January 1999.

=== Venezia ===
On 2 September 1999, he was signed by Serie A side Venezia for 4 billion lire transfer fee. He signed a four-year contract. He followed the team relegated in 2000 and promoted back to Serie A in 2001. But the Venice side relegated again in 2002.

=== Sampdoria ===
After Maurizio Zamparini the owner of Venezia, purchased Palermo (and selling Venezia at the same time), Zamparini bought most of the squad to Sicily, except some players such as Bettarini. Bettarini then joined Serie B side Sampdoria on a free transfer, as Venezia had to reduce the salary expenditure. He signed a reported two-year contract.

According to Bettarini himself, Venenzia had sent a letter to him, accusing that he rejected the transfer to Palermo and then Brescia in mid-2002 transfer window, thus unable to pay his wage for 2002–03 season [sic]. However, he denied that he rejected the moves to Palermo nor Brescia.

=== Match-fixing and Parma ===
In August 2004, he was banned 5 months for match-fixing. Antonio Marasco, Roberto D'Aversa, Generoso Rossi, Maurizio Caccavale and Alfredo Femiano were also banned. Bettarini denied he was guilty and was wrongly included in the investigation.

In January 2005, he left for Parma. Bettarini made his club debut on 3 February 2005 (round 22), against Bologna as starter. That match Gialloblu lost 3–1. He then continued as one of the starting XI. On round 28 (13 March) against Atalanta, he was substituted by Matteo Contini in the 16th minute. He then out of a month due to injury. He came back to field on round 32 (20 April) against his former club Sampdoria, but substituted by Paolo Cannavaro in the second minute. That season Parma reached the semi-final of the UEFA Cup; Bettarini retired at the end of the season.

== International career ==
Bettarini received his only national team call-up in 2004, a warm-up friendly match in Palermo, against the Czech Republic before the start of UEFA Euro 2004, on 18 February. Bettarini's club teammate Sergio Volpi, as well as Parma's Simone Barone, also received their first call-up. During the experimental match, Bettarini played as one of the starting XI, and was replaced by Giuseppe Pancaro in the 79th minute. Italy manager Giovanni Trapattoni used all of his 22-men squad on the field, and made seven substitutions at half time; the match ended in a 2–2 draw.

== Personal life ==
Bettarini was married to Italian television host Simona Ventura between 1998 and 2004; the couple had two children together.
