= Maurizio Domizzi =

Italian football manager (born 1980)

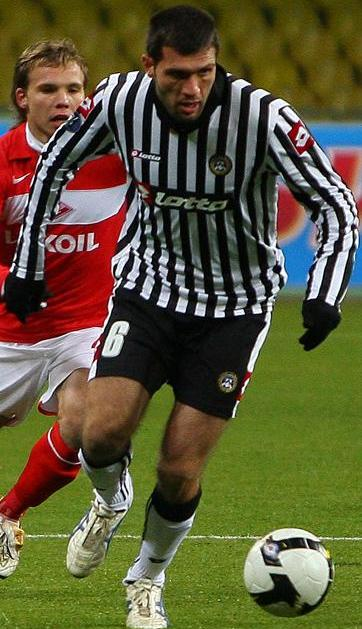
- Domizzi with Udinese in 2008

Personal information
- Date of birth: 28 June 1980 (age 46)
- Place of birth: Rome, Italy
- Height: 1.87 m (6 ft 2 in)
- Position: Defender

Team information
- Current team: Castelvetro (head coach)

Youth career
- –1998: Lazio

Senior career*
Years	Team	Apps	(Gls)
1998–2000	Livorno	23	(1)
2000–2001	Lazio	0	(0)
2001–2002	Milan	0	(0)
2001–2002	→ Modena (loan)	17	(2)
2002–2006	Sampdoria	33	(1)
2004	→ Modena (loan)	17	(1)
2004–2005	→ Brescia (loan)	29	(0)
2005–2006	→ Ascoli (loan)	34	(4)
2006–2008	Napoli	65	(10)
2008–2016	Udinese	173	(6)
2016–2019	Venezia	102	(12)

Managerial career
- 2021: Pordenone
- 2021: Fermana
- 2022–: Castelvetro
- * Club domestic league appearances and goals

Maurizio Domizzi (born 28 June 1980) is an Italian football coach and former player who is the head coach of Eccellenza amateurs Castelvetro. He played as a defender.

== Playing career ==
A S.S. Lazio youth product, Domizzi was farmed to Livorno at Serie C1 in October 1998. In summer 2001, he joined AC Milan, by immediately loaned to Modena at Serie B.

=== Sampdoria ===
In the next season he joined fellow Serie A club Sampdoria along with Andrea Rabito on 21 June 2002 in joint-ownership bid, for 2,005 million lire (€1.035 million) each. Domizzi followed the Genoese club promoted to Serie A, and made his debut on 30 August 2003 against Reggina Calcio. Sampdoria also acquired Domizzi outright for another €4 million, with Rabito returned to Milan for undisclosed fee in June 2003.

Domizzi was loaned to Serie A clubs like Modena and Brescia, in the following seasons to seek more first team experience. In August 2005, he joined Serie A newcomer Ascoli, where he scored four goals.

=== Napoli ===
In summer 2006, he joined Napoli which came back to Serie B from lower levels, for €1.25 million, which Sampdoria retained remain 50% registration rights. After Napoli promoted back to Serie A, He signed a new four-year contract with SSC Napoli, on 18 June 2007, as the club also bought the remain rights from Sampdoria for €1.5 million.

=== Udinese ===
Domizzi joined Udinese on 1 September 2008, on co-ownership with Napoli for €2.5million. In June 2009, Udinese bought the remain half rights from Napoli for €1 million.

In June 2010, his contract was extended to 30 June 2014. On 5 July 2012, he added one more year to his contract, until 2015. His contract was renewed again on 22 May 2014.

== Coaching career ==
After retirement, Domizzi was hired by Pordenone as the club's new Primavera youth coach in 2020.

On 3 April 2021, he was promoted as head coach in charge of the first team, replacing Attilio Tesser at the helm of the Serie B side. After guiding Pordenone to safety in the 2020–21 Serie B, he left the Ramarri by the end of the season.

On 19 June 2021, he was announced as the new head coach of Serie C club Fermana. He resigned on 20 September 2021 following a league loss to Modena.

In June 2022, Domizzi was announced as the new head coach of Eccellenza Emilia-Romagna amateurs Castelvetro for the 2022–23 season.

== Managerial statistics ==
As of 10 May 2021

Managerial record by team and tenure
Team	Nat	From	To	Record							
Team	Nat	From	To	G	W	D	L	GF	GA	GD	Win %
Pordenone	(Italy)	3 April 2021	1 June 2021	8	3	2	3	11	7	+4	37.50
Fermana	(Italy)	19 June 2021	Present	0	0	0	0	0	0	+0	—
Total				8	3	2	3	11	7	+4	37.50
