= Sergio Volpi =

Italian footballer

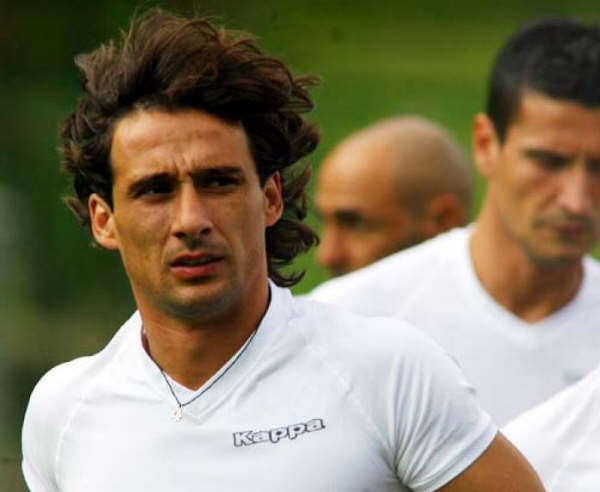

Personal information
- Date of birth: 2 February 1974 (age 52)
- Place of birth: Orzinuovi, Italy
- Height: 1.74 m (5 ft 8 1/2 in)
- Position: Centre midfielder

Youth career
- 1993–1994: Brescia

Senior career*
Years	Team	Apps	(Gls)
1994–1995	→ Carrarese (loan)	23	(1)
1995–1996	Brescia	22	(2)
1996–1998	Bari	61	(8)
1998–2000	Venezia	52	(2)
2000–2002	Piacenza	65	(3)
2002–2008	Sampdoria	193	(22)
2008–2009	Bologna	25	(4)
2009–2010	Reggina	12	(0)
2010	→ Atalanta (loan)	5	(0)
2010–2011	Piacenza	19	(0)

International career
2004	Italy	2	(0)

Managerial career
- 2011–2012: Piacenza (U19)
- 2012–2016: Brescia (U15)
- 2016–2019: ASD Adrense
- 2019: Franciacorta FC
- * Club domestic league appearances and goals

Sergio Volpi (Italian pronunciation: [ˈsɛrdʒo ˈvolpi]; born 2 February 1974) is an Italian former footballer who played as a midfielder. Volpi was capped twice for the Italy senior side at international level, and spent over ten seasons in Serie A throughout his career.

== Club career ==
Volpi started his career at Brescia. He then spent his career in Italian top division, for Bari, Venezia, Piacenza, Sampdoria and Bologna. In summer 2009, he moved to Serie B side Reggina, signed a 2-year contract. In January 2010, he was loaned to Serie A struggler Atalanta but the team failed to avoid relegation. On 2 July 2010, his contract with Reggina was terminated.

== International career ==
Volpi made his international debut with the Italy senior side under manager Giovanni Trapattoni, in a friendly match in Palermo against the Czech Republic on 18 February 2004, at the age of 30. Along with Volpi, Simone Barone and Stefano Bettarini also received their first call-up and made their debut during the match, which ended in a 2–2 draw.

== Coaching career ==
Co-currently with retirement, on 18 July 2011 FIGC announced that he passed the Italian second class coach exam (UEFA A license) and eligible to coach Lega Pro teams. Later on the same month in 2011, Volpi was initially appointed together with Andrea Di Cintio as the new coach of Piacenza, but already on August 5, 2011 the technical guidance of the first team passed to the manager of Primavera, Massimo Cerri, with Volpi taking his place at the helm of the Berretti team of the club. On 29 June 2012 he moved to the leadership of the Giovanissimi Nazionali of Brescia. In July 2016 he became manager of ASD Adrense 1909's juniores team. However, he was promoted to first team manager after Marco Piovanelli was fired at the end of November 2016. In April 2018, he won the first historic Serie D promotion of the club. The following year he was confirmed on the club's bench, whose name changed from Adrense to Franciacorta FC. In December 2019, Volpi resigned.
