= Fabio Bazzani =

Italian footballer

Personal information
- Date of birth: 20 October 1976 (age 50)
- Place of birth: Bologna, Italy
- Height: 1.86 m (6 ft 1 in)
- Position: Striker

Senior career*
Years	Team	Apps	(Gls)
1994–1996	Boca San Lazzaro	57	(30)
1996–1997	Sandonà	32	(5)
1997–1998	Venezia	2	(0)
1998–1999	Varese	29	(3)
1999–2000	Arezzo	31	(20)
2000–2002	Venezia	39	(5)
2001–2002	→ Perugia (loan)	29	(10)
2002–2007	Sampdoria	110	(33)
2005	→ Lazio (loan)	15	(3)
2007–2008	Brescia	21	(1)
2008–2009	Pescara	14	(2)
2009–2010	SPAL	27	(3)
2010–2015	Mezzolara	122	(50)

International career
2003–2004	Italy	3	(0)

Managerial career
- 2015–2016: Mezzolara
- 2017–2018: Ascoli (assistant)
- 2019: Venezia (assistant)
- 2020: Perugia (assistant)
- 2021: Correggese
- 2022: Bologna (technical collaborator)
- * Club domestic league appearances and goals

Fabio Bazzani (Italian pronunciation: [ˈfaːbjo badˈdzaːni]; born 20 October 1976) is an Italian football coach and a former player who played as a striker. As a player, he was known in particular for his heading ability, as well his shooting accuracy and physical strength.

== Club career ==
=== Early career ===
After two seasons with amateur side Boca San Lazzaro, Bazzani moved to Serie C2 club Sandonà. In 1997, he was in Serie B team Venezia, but played only twice in the season. He moved to Varese and then Arezzo, where he made an impression scoring 20 goals in 31 matches under the management of Serse Cosmi. In 2000, he returned to Venezia, but scored only five goals in 36 matches. In 2001, he rejoined his former coach Cosmi when he signed with Serie A side Perugia, where he scored ten goals.

=== Sampdoria ===
In 2002, he moved to Sampdoria, where he scored 16 goals in his first season with the blucerchiati in Serie B and 13 goals in his second campaign with Sampdoria, when in Serie A. During his second season with Sampdoria, he was capped three times in the Italian team. He was loaned to Lazio in exchange for Simone Inzaghi in January 2005, but failed to impress with the biancazzurri and returned to Sampdoria at the end of the season.

=== Later career ===
On 14 June 2007, he was signed by Brescia on a free transfer. He had originally signed for Livorno but the move was cancelled, following protests by the amaranto supporters who did not want the player in their team.

On 26 July 2009, he signed a one-year contract with SPAL. He played his first game for the club on 3 August, a 2–1 win to Como at Coppa Italia. He also played the next two Coppa Italia matches, scored nil. On 1 July 2010, he moved to Mezzolara, in Serie D.

== International career ==
Bazzani made his senior international debut for Italy on 12 November 2003, under Giovanni Trapattoni, in a 3–1 friendly defeat against Poland in Warsaw; he made two more appearances for Italy, with his final appearance coming in a 2–0 friendly loss to Iceland in Reykjavík, on 18 August 2004, under Marcello Lippi.

== Coaching career ==
He started his coaching career upon retiring from playing, staying at Mezzolara.

On 14 May 2021, he was appointed head coach of Serie D club Correggese. His contract expired at the end of the 2020–21 season and he left the club.

On 2 January 2022, he was hired by Bologna as a technical collaborator. On 23 May 2022, Bazzani announced his departure from Bologna.

== Personal life ==
Bazzani has been married since 2005 to Italian showgirl and television personality Alessia Merz, with whom he had a son and a daughter.
