= Riccardo Garrone (entrepreneur) =

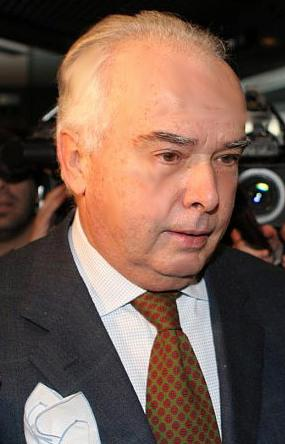

Riccardo Garrone (23 January 1936 – 21 January 2013) was an Italian entrepreneur. He was the owner of Serie A association football club U.C. Sampdoria, and honorary chairman and CEO of Italian oil firm Erg.

Garrone was born in Genoa, and joined his family's firm of ERG before going into the business of football club ownership. He completed the takeover of UC Sampdoria from Enrico Mantovani in 2002, leading the one-time scudetto winners back into Serie A and European competitions thanks to his investments in the club.
