= 2008–09 Torino FC season =

Torino
2008–09 season
- Chairman: Urbano Cairo
- Head coach: Gianni De Biasi (until 8 December 2008); Walter Novellino (until 24 March 2009); Giancarlo Camolese (until 31 May 2009)
- Serie A: 18th (relegated)
- Coppa Italia: Quarter-finals
- Top goalscorer: League: Rolando Bianchi (9); All: Rolando Bianchi (10)
Home colours	Away colours	Third colours

The 2008–09 season was Torino FC's 98th season of competitive football, 84th season in the top division of Italian football and 67th season in Serie A.

== Squad ==
=== First-team squad ===
Note: Flags indicate national team as defined under FIFA eligibility rules; some limited exceptions apply. Players may hold more than one non-FIFA nationality.

No.	Pos.	Nation	Player
1	GK	ITA	Matteo Sereni
3	DF	ITA	Marco Pisano
4	MF	SUI	Blerim Džemaili (on loan from Bolton Wanderers)
5	MF	ITA	Eugenio Corini
6	DF	ITA	Angelo Ogbonna
7	FW	ITA	Nicola Ventola
8	MF	ITA	Simone Barone
9	FW	ITA	Elvis Abbruscato
10	MF	ITA	Alessandro Rosina (captain)
11	FW	ITA	Nicola Amoruso
14	DF	ITA	Cesare Natali
17	FW	ITA	Mario Perinelli
18	FW	FRA	Dominique Malonga
19	MF	ITA	Aimo Stefano Diana

No.	Pos.	Nation	Player
21	DF	ITA	Ivan Franceschini
22	DF	ITA	Marco Di Loreto
23	MF	ITA	Ignazio Abate
24	MF	AUT	Jürgen Säumel
27	MF	ITA	Paolo Zanetti
28	MF	ITA	Tommaso Vailatti
29	MF	ITA	Gianluca Rolandone
30	FW	ITA	Roberto Stellone
31	GK	ITA	Alberto Fontana
32	DF	ITA	Riccardo Colombo
33	DF	ITA	Matteo Rubin
50	DF	ITA	Francesco Pratali
90	FW	ITA	Rolando Bianchi
99	GK	ITA	Alex Calderoni

== Competitions ==
=== Overall ===
Competition	Started round	Current position / round	Final position / round	First match	Last match
Serie A	—	—	18th	31 August 2008	31 May 2009
Coppa Italia	Third round	—	Quarterfinals	23 August 2008	17 December 2008

Updated to match played 21 Nov
Source: Competitions

=== Serie A ===
==== League table ====
Pos	Team	Pld	W	D	L	GF	GA	GD	Pts	Qualification or relegation
16	Chievo	38	8	14	16	35	49	−14	38	
17	Bologna	38	9	10	19	43	62	−19	37	
18	Torino (R)	38	8	10	20	37	61	−24	34	Relegation to Serie B
19	Reggina (R)	38	6	13	19	30	62	−32	31	Relegation to Serie B
20	Lecce (R)	38	5	15	18	37	67	−30	30	Relegation to Serie B

Source: lega-calcio.it (in Italian)
Rules for classification: 1) points; 2) head-to-head points; 3) head-to-head goal difference; 4) head-to-head goals scored; 5) goal difference; 6) number of goals scored.
(R) Relegated

==== Results summary ====
Overall								Home						Away					
Pld	W	D	L	GF	GA	GD	Pts	W	D	L	GF	GA	GD	W	D	L	GF	GA	GD
38	8	10	20	37	61	−24	34	7	4	8	21	25	−4	1	6	12	16	36	−20

Source: Competitive matches

==== Results by round ====
Round	1	2	3	4	5	6	7	8	9	10	11	12	13	14	15	16	17	18	19	20	21	22	23	24	25	26	27	28	29	30	31	32	33	34	35	36	37	38
Ground	H	A	H	A	H	A	H	A	H	A	H	A	H	A	H	A	H	A	H	A	H	A	H	A	H	A	H	A	H	A	H	A	H	A	H	A	H	A
Result	W	D	L	D	L	L	L	L	W	L	W	L	D	L	L	L	W	L	L	D	D	D	D	D	W	D	L	L	L	L	W	L	W	L	D	W	L	L
Position	2	3	9	11	15	15	17	19	15	17	14	17	16	17	17	18	17	18	18	18	18	18	18	18	17	16	17	18	18	18	17	17	17	17	17	17	18	18

Source: Competitive matches
A = Away; H = Home; W = Win; D = Draw; L = Loss

==== Matches ====
31 August 2008 1	Torino	3–0	Lecce	Turin
15:00 CEST (UTC+02:00)	Rosina 29' (pen.); Zanetti 33'; Bianchi 75'			Stadium: Stadio Olimpico di Torino; Attendance: 17,276; Referee: Andrea Gervasoni

14 September 2008 2	Reggina	1–1	Torino	Reggio Calabria
15:00 CEST (UTC+02:00)	Di Loreto 43' (o.g.)		Amoruso 12'	Stadium: Stadio Oreste Granillo; Attendance: 10,105; Referee: Nicola Pierpaoli

21 September 2008 3	Torino	1–3	Internazionale	Turin
15:00 CEST (UTC+02:00)	Abbruscato 76'		Pisano 24' (o.g.); Maicon 26'; Ibrahimović 51'	Stadium: Stadio Olimpico di Torino; Attendance: 21,497; Referee: Stefano Farina

24 September 2008 4	Chievo	1–1	Torino	Verona
20:30 CEST (UTC+02:00)	Marcolini 50'		Bianchi 40' (pen.)	Stadium: Stadio Marcantonio Bentegodi; Attendance: 9,343; Referee: Oscar Girardi

28 September 2008 5	Torino	1–3	Lazio	Turin
15:00 CEST (UTC+02:00)	Amoruso 90+2' (pen.)		Pandev 30'; Zarate 63', 83' (pen.)	Stadium: Stadio Olimpico di Torino; Attendance: 15,264; Referee: Gabriele Gava

5 October 2008 6	Udinese	2–0	Torino	Udine
15:00 CEST (UTC+02:00)	Quagliarella 44', 77'			Stadium: Stadio Friuli; Attendance: 13,852; Referee: Mauro Bergonzi

19 October 2008 7	Torino	0–1	Cagliari	Turin
15:00 CEST (UTC+02:00)			Acquafresca 85'	Stadium: Stadio Olimpico di Torino; Attendance: 15,737; Referee: Luca Banti

25 October 2008 8	Juventus	1–0	Torino	Turin
20:30 CEST (UTC+02:00)	Amauri 48'			Stadium: Stadio Olimpico di Torino; Attendance: 22,114; Referee: Gianluca Rocchi

29 October 2008 9	Torino	2–1	Atalanta	Turin
20:30 CET (UTC+01:00)	Amoruso 62'; Stellone 64'		Floccari 66'	Stadium: Stadio Olimpico di Torino; Attendance: 14,919; Referee: Andrea De Marco

2 November 2008 10	Sampdoria	1–0	Torino	Genoa
15:00 CET (UTC+01:00)	Bellucci 85'			Stadium: Stadio Luigi Ferraris; Attendance: 20,511; Referee: Nicola Ayroldi

8 November 2008 11	Torino	1–0	Palermo	Turin
18:00 CET (UTC+01:00)	Säumel 89'			Stadium: Stadio Olimpico di Torino; Attendance: 16,169; Referee: Nicola Rizzoli

16 November 2008 12	Catania	3–2	Torino	Catania
15:00 CET (UTC+01:00)	Mascara 8', 40', 80'		Colombo 7'; Amoruso 50' (pen.)	Stadium: Stadio Angelo Massimino; Attendance: 18,000; Referee: Andrea Gervasoni

23 November 2008 13	Torino	2–2	Milan	Turin
20:30 CET (UTC+01:00)	Stellone 25'; Rosina 78' (pen.)		Pato 29'; Ronaldinho 34'	Stadium: Stadio Olimpico di Torino; Attendance: 22,627; Referee: Stefano Farina

30 November 2008 14	Siena	1–0	Torino	Siena
15:00 CET (UTC+01:00)	Maccarone 19'			Stadium: Stadio Artemio Franchi – Montepaschi Arena; Attendance: 9,556; Referee: Emidio Morganti

7 December 2008 15	Torino	1–4	Fiorentina	Turin
15:00 CET (UTC+01:00)	Rosina 77' (pen.)		Mutu 2'; Gilardino 43', 84'; Kuzmanović 75'	Stadium: Stadio Olimpico di Torino; Attendance: 15,627; Referee: Massimiliano Saccani

13 December 2008 16	Bologna	5–2	Torino	Bologna
18:00 CET (UTC+01:00)	Volpi 48'; Di Vaio 55', 62', 79' (pen.); Bernacci 68' (pen.)		Barone 7'; Britos 53' (o.g.)	Stadium: Stadio Renato Dall'Ara; Attendance: 16,658; Referee: Gianluca Rocchi

21 December 2008 17	Torino	1–0	Napoli	Turin
15:00 CET (UTC+01:00)	Bianchi 53'			Stadium: Stadio Olimpico di Torino; Attendance: 15,627; Referee: Nicola Rizzoli

10 January 2009 18	Genoa	3–0	Torino	Genoa
18:00 CET (UTC+01:00)	Biava 18'; Jankovic 48'; Thiago Motta 84'			Stadium: Stadio Luigi Ferraris; Attendance: 26,829; Referee: Antonio Damato

18 January 2009 19	Torino	0–1	Roma	Turin
15:00 CET (UTC+01:00)			Júlio Baptista 90+1'	Stadium: Stadio Olimpico di Torino; Attendance: 16,080; Referee: Gianluca Rocchi

25 January 2009 20	Lecce	3–3	Torino	Lecce
15:00 CET (UTC+01:00)	Munari 12', 45+1'; Castillo 73'		Säumel 47'; Dellafiore 56'; Natali 77'	Stadium: Stadio Via del Mare; Attendance: 7,888; Referee: Matteo Trefoloni

28 January 2009 21	Torino	0–0	Reggina	Turin
20:30 CET (UTC+01:00)				Stadium: Stadio Olimpico di Torino; Attendance: 15,098; Referee: Stefano Farina

1 February 2009 22	Internazionale	1–1	Torino	Milan
15:15 CET (UTC+01:00)	Burdisso 58'		Bianchi 47'	Stadium: San Siro; Attendance: 43,040; Referee: Mauro Bergonzi

8 February 2009 23	Torino	1–1	Chievo	Turin
15:00 CET (UTC+01:00)	Ventola 64'		Italiano 83'	Stadium: Stadio Olimpico di Torino; Attendance: 15,217; Referee: Matteo Trefoloni

14 February 2009 24	Lazio	1–1	Torino	Rome
18:00 CET (UTC+01:00)	Siviglia 75'		Abate 36'	Stadium: Stadio Olimpico; Attendance: 28,163; Referee: Massimiliano Saccani

22 February 2009 25	Torino	1–0	Udinese	Turin
15:00 CET (UTC+01:00)	Dellafiore 80'			Stadium: Stadio Olimpico di Torino; Attendance: 16,087; Referee: Andrea De Marco

1 March 2009 26	Cagliari	0–0	Torino	Cagliari
15:00 CET (UTC+01:00)				Stadium: Stadio Sant'Elia; Attendance: 10,000; Referee: Daniele Orsato

7 March 2009 27	Torino	0–1	Juventus	Turin
20:30 CET (UTC+01:00)			Chiellini 81'	Stadium: Stadio Olimpico di Torino; Attendance: 21,107; Referee: Stefano Farina

15 March 2009 28	Atalanta	2–0	Torino	Bergamo
15:00 CET (UTC+01:00)	Floccari 46', 73'			Stadium: Stadio Atleti Azzurri d'Italia; Attendance: 10,844; Referee: Massimiliano Saccani

22 March 2009 29	Torino	1–3	Sampdoria	Turin
15:00 CET (UTC+01:00)	Bianchi 29'		Pazzini 8'; Sammarco 24'; Cassano 69'	Stadium: Stadio Olimpico di Torino; Attendance: 16,034; Referee: Emidio Morganti

5 April 2009 30	Palermo	1–0	Torino	Palermo
15:00 CEST (UTC+02:00)	Cavani 51'			Stadium: Stadio Renzo Barbera; Attendance: 18,834; Referee: Andrea De Marco

11 April 2009 31	Torino	2–1	Catania	Turin
15:00 CEST (UTC+02:00)	Bianchi 82'; Natali 88'		Martínez 85'	Stadium: Stadio Olimpico di Torino; Attendance: 15,924; Referee: Daniele Orsato

19 April 2009 32	Milan	5–1	Torino	Milan
20:30 CEST (UTC+02:00)	F. Inzaghi 13', 37', 60'; Kaká 68' (pen.); Ambrosini 90'		Franceschini 80'	Stadium: San Siro; Attendance: 54,061; Referee: Luca Banti

26 April 2009 33	Torino	1–0	Siena	Turin
15:00 CEST (UTC+02:00)	Bianchi 10'			Stadium: Stadio Olimpico di Torino; Attendance: 15,177; Referee: Antonio Damato

3 May 2009 34	Fiorentina	1–0	Torino	Florence
15:00 CEST (UTC+02:00)	Vargas 57'			Stadium: Stadio Artemio Franchi; Attendance: 31,218; Referee: Stefano Farina

10 May 2009 35	Torino	1–1	Bologna	Turin
15:00 CEST (UTC+02:00)	Rosina 37' (pen.)		Di Vaio 86' (pen.)	Stadium: Stadio Olimpico di Torino; Attendance: 23,228; Referee: Emidio Morganti

17 May 2009 36	Napoli	1–2	Torino	Naples
15:00 CEST (UTC+02:00)	Piá 42'		Bianchi 51'; Rosina 72'	Stadium: Stadio San Paolo; Attendance: 30,091; Referee: Antonio Damato

24 May 2009 37	Torino	2–3	Genoa	Turin
15:00 CEST (UTC+02:00)	Franceschini 40'; Bianchi 50'		Milito 33' (pen.), 90'; Olivera 48'	Stadium: Stadio Olimpico di Torino; Attendance: 23,982; Referee: Massimiliano Saccani

31 May 2009 38	Roma	3–2	Torino	Rome
15:00 CEST (UTC+02:00)	Ménez 36'; Vučinić 74'; Totti 83' (pen.)		Vailatti 9'; Ventola 88'	Stadium: Stadio Olimpico; Attendance: 37,405; Referee: Antonio Damato

=== Coppa Italia ===
23 August 2008 Third round	Torino	2–1 (a.e.t.)	Brescia	Turin
20:45 CEST (UTC+02:00)	Rosina 63'; Di Michele 105'		Possanzini 35'	Stadium: Stadio Olimpico di Torino; Attendance: 11,137; Referee: Mauro Bergonzi

1 October 2008 Fourth round	Torino	3–2 (a.e.t.)	Livorno	Turin
20:30 CEST (UTC+02:00)	Corini 8'; Zanetti 45'; Barone 94'		Diamanti 19', 86' (pen.)	Stadium: Stadio Olimpico di Torino; Attendance: 6,076; Referee: Andrea De Marco

17 December 2008 Round of 16	Fiorentina	0–1	Torino	Florence
17:00 CET (UTC+01:00)			Bianchi 19'	Stadium: Stadio Artemio Franchi; Attendance: 6,410; Referee: Antonio Damato

22 January 2009 Quarter-finals	Lazio	3–1	Torino	Rome
21:00 CET (UTC+01:00)	Pandev 49'; Mauri 55'; Rocchi 91'		Natali 29'	Stadium: Stadio Olimpico; Attendance: 8,965; Referee: Andrea Gervasoni
