= 2012–13 AC Siena season =

Siena
2012–13 season
- Manager: Serse Cosmi (until December 2012); Giuseppe Iachini (from December 2012)
- Stadium: Montepaschi Arena
- Serie A: 19th (relegated)
- Coppa Italia: Round of 16
- Top goalscorer: League: Innocent Emeghara (7); All: Innocent Emeghara (7)

The 2012–13 AC Siena season was the 107th season in existence and 9th season in the top flight of Italian football, Serie A.

== Players ==
=== Squad ===
Note: Flags indicate national team as defined under FIFA eligibility rules; some limited exceptions apply. Players may hold more than one non-FIFA nationality.

No.	Pos.	Nation	Player
3	DF	(Brazil) BRA	Bruno Uvini (on loan from Napoli)
5	MF	(Argentina) ARG	Adrián Calello
6	MF	(Brazil) BRA	Ângelo
7	MF	(Italy) ITA	Francesco Valiani
8	MF	(Italy) ITA	Simone Vergassola (captain)
9	FW	(Italy) ITA	Michele Paolucci
10	FW	(Switzerland) SUI	Innocent Emeghara (on loan from (France) Lorient)
12	GK	(Italy) ITA	Simone Farelli
14	MF	(Italy) ITA	Francesco Della Rocca (on loan from Palermo)
16	MF	(Italy) ITA	Valerio Verre (on loan from Genoa)
17	DF	(Italy) ITA	Nicola Belmonte
18	DF	(Brazil) BRA	Felipe (on loan from Fiorentina)
20	DF	(Argentina) ARG	Carlos Matheu (on loan from Atalanta)
23	FW	(Portugal) POR	Salvador Agra (on loan from (Spain) Real Betis)

No.	Pos.	Nation	Player
24	DF	(Italy) ITA	Massimo Paci
25	GK	(Italy) ITA	Gianluca Pegolo
27	MF	(Italy) ITA	Alessandro Rosina
33	DF	(Italy) ITA	Matteo Rubin
36	MF	(Italy) ITA	Francesco Bolzoni
57	FW	(Brazil) BRA	Zé Eduardo (on loan from Genoa)
70	MF	(Italy) ITA	Daniele Mannini
77	MF	(Italy) ITA	Alessio Sestu
81	FW	(Albania) ALB	Erjon Bogdani
86	DF	(Portugal) POR	Jorge Teixeira (on loan from (Switzerland) Zürich)
87	DF	(Italy) ITA	Fabrizio Grillo
88	DF	(Italy) ITA	Christian Terlizzi (on loan from Pescara)
91	FW	(Brazil) BRA	Reginaldo
99	FW	(Italy) ITA	Nicola Pozzi (on loan from Sampdoria)

== Competitions ==
=== Serie A ===
==== League table ====
Pos	Team	Pld	W	D	L	GF	GA	GD	Pts	Qualification or relegation
16	Torino	38	8	16	14	46	55	−9	39 (Note: Sampdoria and Torino were docked 1 point due to involvement in the 2011–12 Italian football scandal.)	
17	Genoa	38	8	14	16	38	52	−14	38	
18	Palermo (R)	38	6	14	18	34	54	−20	32	Relegation to Serie B
19	Siena (R)	38	9	9	20	36	57	−21	30 (Note: Siena was docked 6 points due to involvement in the 2011–12 Italian football scandal.)	Relegation to Serie B
20	Pescara (R)	38	6	4	28	27	84	−57	22	Relegation to Serie B

Source: Serie A, Soccerway
Rules for classification: 1st points; 2nd head-to-head points; 3rd head-to-head goal difference; 4th goal difference; 5th number of goals scored; 6th public draw.
(Head-to-head record is applied for clubs with the same number of points only once all matches between said clubs have been played)
(R) Relegated

==== Results summary ====
Overall								Home						Away					
Pld	W	D	L	GF	GA	GD	Pts	W	D	L	GF	GA	GD	W	D	L	GF	GA	GD
38	9	9	20	36	57	−21	36	6	5	8	16	19	−3	3	4	12	20	38	−18

Last updated: 19 May 2013.
Source: Competitive matches

==== Results by round ====
Round	1	2	3	4	5	6	7	8	9	10	11	12	13	14	15	16	17	18	19	20	21	22	23	24	25	26	27	28	29	30	31	32	33	34	35	36	37	38
Ground	H	A	H	A	H	A	H	A	H	A	H	A	H	A	H	H	A	H	A	A	H	A	H	A	H	A	H	A	H	A	H	A	H	A	A	H	A	H
Result	D	L	D	W	W	L	L	L	D	L	W	D	W	D	L	L	L	L	L	L	W	L	W	D	W	L	L	W	D	D	D	W	L	L	L	L	L	L
Position	11	15	16	10	8	9	11	14	15	16	14	14	11	12	13	14	16	16	18	19	16	17	17	17	16	17	17	17	17	17	17	16	17	17	17	18	18	19

Updated to match(es) played on 19 May 2013. Source: Competitive matches
A = Away; H = Home; W = Win; D = Draw; L = Loss

==== Matches ====
Win Draw Loss Postponed

=== Serie A ===
26 August 2012 1	Siena	0–0	Torino	Siena
				Stadium: Stadio Artemio Franchi; Attendance: 10,000; Referee: Piero Giacomelli

2 September 2012 2	Sampdoria	2–1	Siena	Genoa
	López 45'; Gastaldello 68'		Vergassola 62'	Stadium: Stadio Luigi Ferraris; Attendance: 36,700; Referee: Gianluca Rocchi

16 September 2012 3	Siena	2–2	Udinese	Siena
	Calaiò 70'; Zé Eduardo 77'		Basta 3'; Di Natale 5'	Stadium: Stadio Artemio Franchi; Attendance: 10,000; Referee: Andrea De Marco

23 September 2012 4	Inter	0–2	Siena	Milan
			Vergassola 73'; Valiani 90+2'	Stadium: San Siro; Attendance: 44,000; Referee: Davide Massa

27 September 2012 5	Siena	1–0	Bologna	Siena
	Calaiò 61'			Stadium: Stadio Artemio Franchi; Attendance: 8,180; Referee: Andrea Gervasoni

30 September 2012 6	Lazio	2–1	Siena	Rome
	Ederson 18'; Ledesma 38' (pen.)		Paci 90+1'	Stadium: Stadio Olimpico; Attendance: 25,000; Referee: Carmine Russo

7 October 2012 7	Siena	1–2	Juventus	Siena
	Calaiò 45+2'		Pirlo 14'; Marchisio 85'	Stadium: Stadio Artemio Franchi; Attendance: 15,373; Referee: Paolo Silvio Mazzoleni

21 October 2012 8	Atalanta	2–1	Siena	Bergamo
	Cigarini 62'; Bonaventura 82'		Reginaldo 60'	Stadium: Stadio Atleti Azzurri d'Italia; Attendance: 15,000; Referee: Nicola Rizzoli

27 October 2012 9	Siena	0–0	Palermo	Siena
				Stadium: Stadio Artemio Franchi; Attendance: 8,708; Referee: Giampaolo Calvarese

31 October 2012 10	Cagliari	4–2	Siena	Quartu Sant'Elena
	Nenê 6', 26'; Sau 28'; Ribeiro 89'		Bogdani 42'; Calaiò 90+3'	Stadium: Stadio Is Arenas; Attendance: 8,500; Referee: Marco Guida

4 November 2012 11	Siena	1–0	Genoa	Siena
	Paci 55'			Stadium: Stadio Artemio Franchi; Attendance: 10,000; Referee: Sebastiano Peruzzo

11 November 12	Parma	0–0	Siena	Parma
				Stadium: Stadio Ennio Tardini; Attendance: 10,792; Referee: Domenico Celi

18 November 2012 13	Siena	1–0	Pescara	Siena
	Valiani 31'			Stadium: Stadio Artemio Franchi; Attendance: 9,500; Referee: Massimiliano Irrati

25 November 2012 14	Chievo	0–0	Siena	Verona
				Stadium: Stadio Marc'Antonio Bentegodi; Attendance: 9,500; Referee: Davide Massa

2 December 2012 15	Siena	1–3	Roma	Siena
	Luís Neto 25'		Destro 63'; Perrotta 86'; Pjanić 90+1'	Stadium: Stadio Artemio Franchi; Attendance: 10,291; Referee: Paolo Silvio Mazzoleni

9 December 2012 16	Siena	1–3	Catania	Siena
	Rosina 10'		Castro 50'; Bergessio 67', 82'	Stadium: Stadio Artemio Franchi; Attendance: 8,240; Referee: Daniele Doveri

16 December 2012 17	Fiorentina	4–1	Siena	Florence
	Toni 16', 79'; Pizarro 19' (pen.); Aquilani 45'		Reginaldo 70'	Stadium: Stadio Artemio Franchi; Attendance: 22,000; Referee: Paolo Tagliavento

22 December 2012 18	Siena	0–2	Napoli	Siena
			Maggio 86'; Cavani 90' (pen.)	Stadium: Stadio Artemio Franchi; Attendance: 9,500; Referee: Andrea De Marco

6 January 2013 19	Milan	2–1	Siena	Milan
	Bojan 67'; Pazzini 80' (pen.)		Paolucci 87'	Stadium: San Siro; Attendance: 50,000; Referee: Giampaolo Calvarese

13 January 2013 20	Torino	3–2	Siena	Turin
	Brighi 5'; Bianchi 38'; Cerci 45+2'		Reginaldo 32'; Paolucci 76'	Stadium: Stadio Olimpico di Torino; Attendance: 15,000; Referee: Marco Di Bello

20 January 2013 21	Siena	1–0	Sampdoria	Siena
	Bogdani 71'			Stadium: Stadio Artemio Franchi; Attendance: 7,961; Referee: Carmine Russo

27 January 2013 22	Udinese	1–0	Siena	Udine
	Muriel 36'			Stadium: Stadio Friuli; Attendance: 17,000; Referee: Sebastiano Peruzzo

3 February 2013 23	Siena	3–1	Inter	Siena
	Emeghara 21'; Sestu 24'; Rosina 55' (pen.)		Cassano 22'	Stadium: Stadio Artemio Franchi; Attendance: 9,000; Referee: Daniele Doveri

10 February 2013 24	Bologna	1–1	Siena	Bologna
	Kone 41'		Emeghara 33'	Stadium: Stadio Renato Dall'Ara; Attendance: 20,000; Referee: Piero Giacomelli

18 February 2013 25	Siena	3–0	Lazio	Siena
	Emeghara 7', 61'; Rosina 23'			Stadium: Stadio Artemio Franchi; Attendance: 8,679; Referee: Antonio Giannoccaro

24 February 2013 26	Juventus	3–0	Siena	Turin
	Lichtsteiner 30'; Giovinco 74'; Pogba 89'			Stadium: Juventus Stadium; Attendance: 38,000; Referee: Domenico Celi

3 March 2013 27	Siena	0–2	Atalanta	Siena
			Bonaventura 3', 68'	Stadium: Stadio Artemio Franchi; Attendance: 9,500; Referee: Paolo Tagliavento

10 March 2013 28	Palermo	1–2	Siena	Palermo
	Anselmo 44'		Emeghara 51'; Rosina 72' (pen.)	Stadium: Stadio Renzo Barbera; Attendance: 17,000; Referee: Andrea Romeo

17 March 2013 29	Siena	0–0	Cagliari	Siena
				Stadium: Stadio Artemio Franchi; Attendance: 8,639; Referee: Daniele Doveri

30 March 2013 30	Genoa	2–2	Siena	Genoa
	Borriello 6'; Janković 71'		Emeghara 43'; Rosina 52' (pen.)	Stadium: Stadio Luigi Ferraris; Attendance: 20,000; Referee: Gianluca Rocchi

7 April 2013 31	Siena	0–0	Parma	Siena
				Stadium: Stadio Artemio Franchi; Attendance: 9,000; Referee: Mauro Bergonzi

13 April 2013 32	Pescara	2–3	Siena	Pescara
	Çelik 52'; Togni 59'		Ângelo 14'; Zanon 33' (o.g.); Emeghara 86'	Stadium: Stadio Adriatico; Attendance: 8,851; Referee: Nicola Rizzoli

21 April 2013 33	Siena	0–1	Chievo	Siena
			Pellissier 45'	Stadium: Stadio Artemio Franchi; Attendance: 9,500; Referee: Paolo Valeri

28 April 2013 34	Roma	4–0	Siena	Rome
	Osvaldo 14', 41', 67'; Lamela 16'			Stadium: Stadio Olimpico; Attendance: 40,000; Referee: Carmine Russo

5 May 2013 35	Catania	3–0	Siena	Catania
	Bergessio 14', 52', 71'			Stadium: Stadio Angelo Massimino; Attendance: 13,000; Referee: Luca Banti

8 May 2013 36	Siena	0–1	Fiorentina	Siena
			Rodríguez 14'	Stadium: Stadio Artemio Franchi; Attendance: 9,000; Referee: Daniele Orsato

12 May 2013 37	Napoli	2–1	Siena	Naples
	Cavani 73'; Hamšík 90+3'		Grillo 36'	Stadium: Stadio San Paolo; Attendance: 39,000; Referee: Piero Giacomelli

19 May 2013 38	Siena	1–2	Milan	Siena
	Terzi 25'		Balotelli 84' (pen.); Mexès 87'	Stadium: Stadio Artemio Franchi; Attendance: 13,083; Referee: Mauro Bergonzi

=== Coppa Italia ===
19 August 2012 Third round	Siena	4–2	Vicenza	Siena
	Calaiò 26'; D'Agostino 56', 68'; Verre 90+5'		Martinelli 17'; Minesso 57'	Stadium: Stadio Artemio Franchi; Attendance: 3,000; Referee: Gianluca Rocchi

28 November 2012 Fourth round	Siena	2–0	Torino	Siena
	Zé Eduardo 46'; Reginaldo 77'			Stadium: Stadio Artemio Franchi; Attendance: 1,000; Referee: Luigi Nasca

19 December 2012 Round of 16	Lazio	1–1 (a.e.t.) (4–1 p)	Siena	Rome
15:00 CET	Ciani 90+5'		Cana 56' (o.g.)	Stadium: Stadio Olimpico; Attendance: 6,682; Referee: Piero Giacomelli
	Penalties
	Mauri (penalty scored); Ledesma (penalty scored); Floccari (penalty scored); Kozák (penalty scored)		Belmonte (penalty scored); Vergassola (penalty missed); Larrondo (penalty missed)

== Squad statistics ==
=== Appearances and goals ===
No.	Pos	Nat	Player	Total		Serie A		Coppa Italia	
No.	Pos	Nat	Player	Apps	Goals	Apps	Goals	Apps	Goals
Goalkeepers
12	GK	(Italy) ITA	Simone Farelli	2	0	0	0	1+1	0
23	GK	(Italy) ITA	Andrea Campagnolo	1	0	0	0	1	0
25	GK	(Italy) ITA	Gianluca Pegolo	39	0	38	0	1	0
Defenders
3	DF	(Brazil) BRA	Bruno Uvini	0	0	0	0	0	0
17	DF	(Italy) ITA	Nicola Belmonte	7	0	6+1	0	0	0
18	DF	(Brazil) BRA	Felipe	35	0	34	0	1	0
20	DF	(Argentina) ARG	Carlos Matheu	0	0	0	0	0	0
24	DF	(Italy) ITA	Massimo Paci	25	2	20+3	2	2	0
33	DF	(Italy) ITA	Matteo Rubin	26	0	23+2	0	0+1	0
86	DF	(Portugal) POR	Jorge Teixeira	9	0	9	0	0	0
87	DF	(Italy) ITA	Fabrizio Grillo	1	1	1	1	0	0
88	DF	(Italy) ITA	Christian Terlizzi	9	0	9	0	0	0
Midfielders
5	MF	(Argentina) ARG	Adrián Calello	9	0	8+1	0	0	0
6	MF	(Brazil) BRA	Ângelo	28	1	27+1	1	0	0
7	MF	(Italy) ITA	Francesco Valiani	24	2	13+9	2	2	0
8	MF	(Italy) ITA	Simone Vergassola	32	2	29+1	2	2	0
14	MF	(Italy) ITA	Francesco Della Rocca	17	0	16+1	0	0	0
16	MF	(Italy) ITA	Valerio Verre	10	1	2+6	0	1+1	1
27	MF	(Italy) ITA	Alessandro Rosina	32	5	29+2	5	1	0
36	MF	(Italy) ITA	Francesco Bolzoni	26	0	16+9	0	0+1	0
70	MF	(Italy) ITA	Daniele Mannini	8	0	3+4	0	1	0
77	MF	(Italy) ITA	Alessio Sestu	29	1	13+15	1	0+1	0
Forwards
9	FW	(Italy) ITA	Michele Paolucci	10	2	1+9	2	0	0
10	FW	(Switzerland) SUI	Innocent Emeghara	17	7	16+1	7	0	0
23	FW	(Portugal) POR	Salvador Agra	9	0	3+6	0	0	0
57	FW	(Brazil) BRA	Zé Eduardo	9	2	6+2	1	1	1
81	FW	(Albania) ALB	Erjon Bogdani	20	2	4+14	2	2	0
91	FW	(Brazil) BRA	Reginaldo	21	4	5+14	3	2	1
99	FW	(Italy) ITA	Nicola Pozzi	3	0	0+3	0	0	0
Players transferred out during the season
3	DF	(Italy) ITA	Cristiano Del Grosso	19	0	15+1	0	3	0
5	MF	(Italy) ITA	Manuel Coppola	3	0	0+2	0	0+1	0
10	MF	(Italy) ITA	Gaetano D'Agostino	11	2	7+1	0	3	2
11	FW	(Italy) ITA	Emanuele Calaiò	19	5	18	4	1	1
13	DF	(Portugal) POR	Luís Neto	22	1	20	1	2	0
15	DF	(Italy) ITA	Paolo Dellafiore	3	0	2	0	1	0
22	DF	(Italy) ITA	Matteo Contini	13	0	10	0	3	0
63	FW	(Argentina) ARG	Marcelo Larrondo	4	0	1+2	0	0+1	0
92	MF	(Chile) CHI	Matías Campos	1	0	0+1	0	0	0

Last updated: 28 October 2012
Source: Competitions

=== Top scorers ===
This includes all competitive matches. The list is sorted by shirt number when total goals are equal.

R	No.	Pos	Nat	Name	Serie A	Coppa Italia	Total
1	10	FW	(Switzerland)	Innocent Emeghara	7	0	7
2	11	FW	(Italy)	Emanuele Calaiò	4	1	5
=	27	MF	(Italy)	Alessandro Rosina	5	0	5
4	91	FW	(Brazil)	Reginaldo	3	1	4
5				Own goals	2	1	3
6	7	MF	(Italy)	Francesco Valiani	2	0	2
=	8	MF	(Italy)	Simone Vergassola	2	0	2
=	9	FW	(Italy)	Michele Paolucci	2	0	2
=	10	MF	(Italy)	Gaetano D'Agostino	0	2	2
=	24	DF	(Italy)	Massimo Paci	2	0	2
=	57	FW	(Brazil)	Zé Eduardo	1	1	2
=	81	FW	(Albania)	Erjon Bogdani	2	0	2
13	6	MF	(Brazil)	Ângelo	1	0	1
=	13	DF	(Portugal)	Luís Neto	1	0	1
=	16	MF	(Italy)	Valerio Verre	0	1	1
=	77	MF	(Italy)	Alessio Sestu	1	0	1
=	87	DF	(Italy)	Fabrizio Grillo	1	0	1

Last updated: 28 October 2012
Source: Competitions
