= Massimo Loviso =

Italian footballer (born 1984)

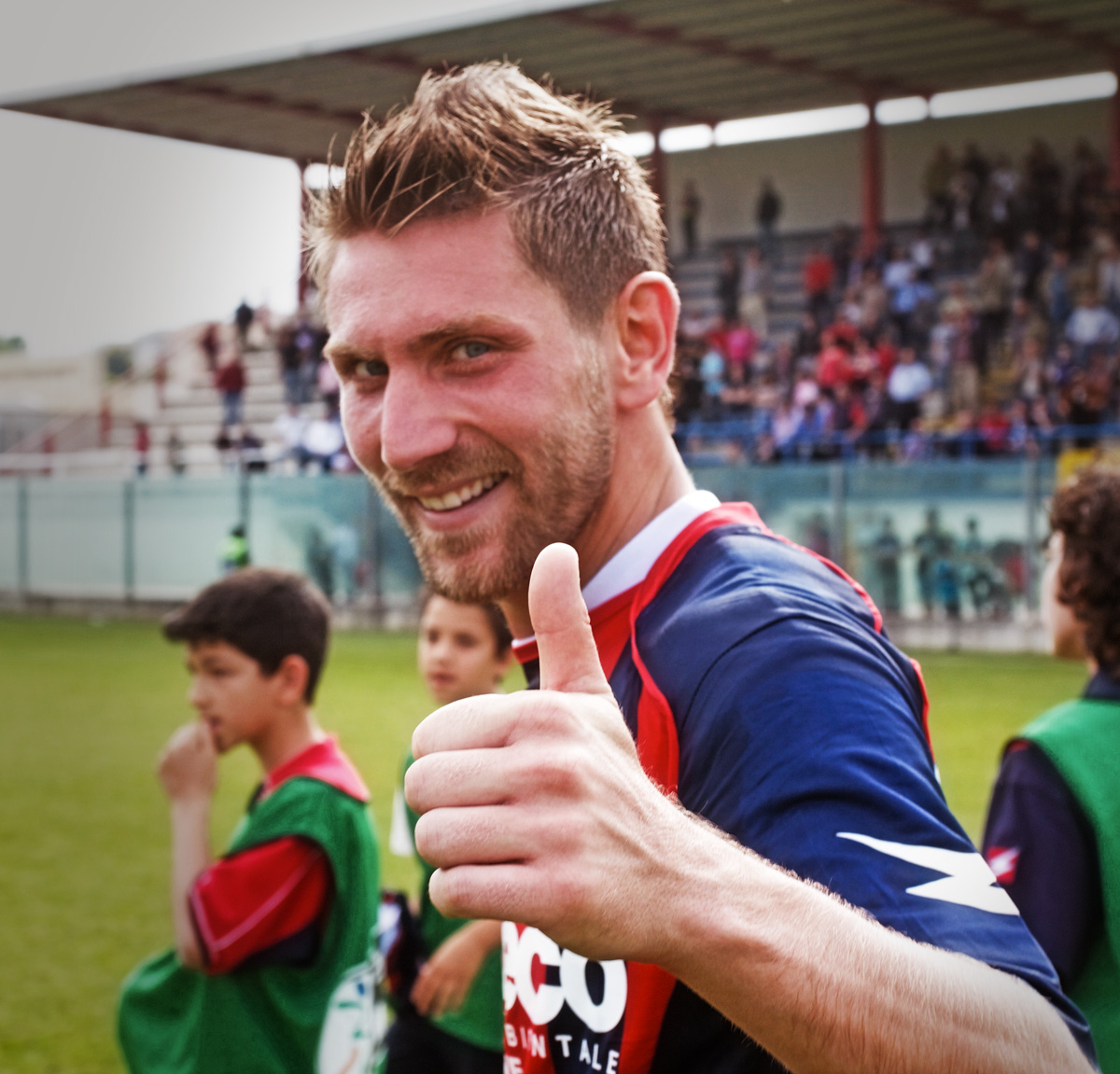

Personal information
- Date of birth: 9 April 1984 (age 42)
- Place of birth: Bentivoglio, Italy
- Height: 1.77 m (5 ft 10 in)
- Position: Midfielder

Youth career
- –2003: Bologna

Senior career*
Years	Team	Apps	(Gls)
2003–2007	Bologna	57	(2)
2006–2007	→ Sambenedettese (loan)	31	(0)
2007–2009	Livorno	57	(6)
2009–2011	Torino	17	(0)
2010	→ Lecce (loan)	5	(0)
2011	→ Crotone (loan)	13	(0)
2011–2013	Crotone	16	(1)
2012–2013	→ Ascoli (loan)	34	(3)
2013–2015	Parma	0	(0)
2013–2014	→ Cremonese (loan)	23	(1)
2014–2015	→ Gubbio (loan)	37	(12)
2015–2016	Alessandria	12	(1)
2016–2017	AlbinoLeffe	27	(4)
2017–2018	Cosenza	27	(2)
2018–2019	Modena	23	(3)
2019–2020	Rende	15	(0)
2020–2021	ASD Castelnuovo Vomano	29	(14)
2021	San Nicolò Notaresco	3	(1)
2021–2022	L'Aquila		
2022	Maceratese		
2022–2023	Sangiustese		
2023–2024	Monturanese Calcio		
2024–2025	Azzurra SBT		
Total		426	(50)

International career
2004	Italy U20	3	(0)
2004–2005	Italy U21	6	(0)
- * Club domestic league appearances and goals

Massimo Loviso (born 9 April 1984) is an Italian former professional footballer who plays as a midfielder.

== Career ==
=== Bologna ===
Born in Bentivoglio, the Province of Bologna, Loviso started his career at Bologna. After made his debut on 8 November 2003, a 0–0 draw with Brescia as starter, Loviso mainly played as backup.

=== Livorno ===
In June 2007, he joined Serie A side Livorno in a co-ownership deal for €200,000 fee. He only made 16 starts in the first season. Loviso followed the team relegated to Serie B after Livorno bought him outright in June 2008, for an additional €1,000. Partnered with Alessandro Diamanti and Antonio Candreva in the midfield, he won promotion back to Serie A.

=== Torino ===
In August 2009, he was signed by newly relegated Serie B side Torino in another co-ownership deal for €900,000 fee in a 3-year contract.

During 2009–10 season, Ultras of Torino attacked the players during David Di Michele's birthday party. After the incident the players involved: Di Michele, Loviso, Riccardo Colombo, Aimo Diana, Marco Pisano, Francesco Pratali, Paolo Zanetti were transferred to other clubs and only Rolando Bianchi, Matteo Rubin and Angelo Ogbonna were remained.

He left for Lecce along with Di Michele on 1 February 2010. Torino also paid Lecce premiums (Italian: premi di valorizzazione) of €300,000 for the loans.

In June 2010 Torino signed Loviso from Livorno outright for free. Loviso did not leave Turin in 2010–11 season but only able to play with its Primavera reserve team as an overage player.

=== Crotone ===
In January 2011 he left for Crotone in a temporary deal and on 20 July 2011 Torino terminated his contract in order to join Crotone on a free transfer.

In August 2012 he left for Ascoli Calcio 1898 in a temporary deal, with Vito Falconieri moved to opposite direction also on loan.

=== Parma ===
On 29 June 2013. few days before the closure of 2012–13 financial year of F.C.Crotone S.r.l. and Parma F.C. S.p.A., Loviso was sold to Parma in exchange for Fabio Lebran to Crotone. 50% registration rights of both players were "valued" €400,000. Loviso signed a 2-year contract (later extended one more year). In July 2013 Loviso was loaned to Cremonese. In June 2014 Loviso was signed by Parma outright. On 20 August 2014, he was signed by Gubbio in a temporary deal.

=== Lega Pro clubs ===
On 22 June 2015 Loviso became a free agent after the formal bankruptcy of Parma. On 7 July 2015 he was signed by Alessandria in a 2-year contract.

On 22 August 2016 Loviso joined AlbinoLeffe on a free transfer. The club was re-admitted to 2016–17 Lega Pro to fill the vacancy.

On 30 July 2019 he signed with Rende.

On 4 August 2020 he joined Serie D club Castelnuovo Vomano.
