= Paolo Zanetti =

Italian footballer

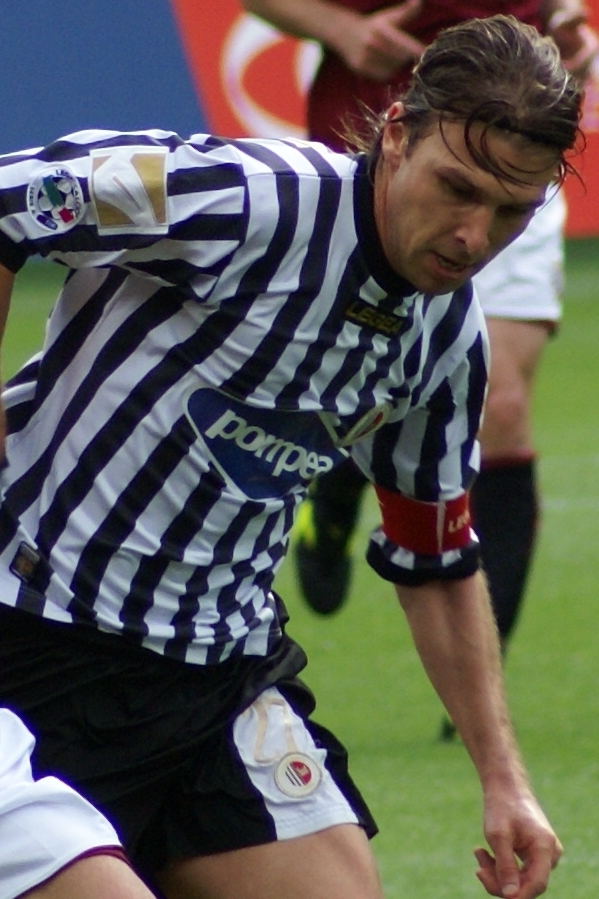
- Zanetti with Ascoli in 2007

Personal information
- Date of birth: 16 December 1982 (age 43)
- Place of birth: Valdagno, Italy
- Height: 1.84 m (6 ft 0 in)
- Position: Midfielder

Team information
- Current team: Udinese (head coach)

Youth career
- –1997: Ponte dei Nori
- 1997–2001: Vicenza

Senior career*
Years	Team	Apps	(Gls)
2001–2003	Vicenza	45	(1)
2003–2006	Empoli	52	(2)
2006–2007	Ascoli	29	(1)
2007–2011	Torino	72	(1)
2010	→ Atalanta (loan)	2	(0)
2011–2012	Grosseto	14	(0)
2012–2013	Sorrento	13	(1)
2013–2014	Reggiana	27	(1)
Total		254	(7)

International career
2000	Italy U19	2	(0)
2000–2001	Italy U20 B	2	(0)
2001–2002	Italy U20	13	(2)
2002–2003	Italy U21	5	(0)

Managerial career
- 2017–2019: Südtirol
- 2019–2020: Ascoli
- 2020–2022: Venezia
- 2022–2023: Empoli
- 2024–2026: Hellas Verona
- 2026–: Udinese
- * Club domestic league appearances and goals

Paolo Zanetti (born 16 December 1982) is an Italian professional football manager and former player, who is currently the head coach of Serie A club Udinese. As a player, he played as a midfielder.

== Club career ==
Zanetti started his career at his hometown club Vicenza.

=== Empoli ===
Zanetti was sold to Empoli in a co-ownership deal in July 2003, for €671,400 fee (about 1.3 billion lire).

In his first season with Empoli, he just made 13 appearances in Serie A. However, Empoli was relegated to Serie B at the end of the season and Zanetti followed the club.

Zanetti played 30 games in the 2004–05 Serie B season, helping the club to win promotion back to Serie A. However, he just made nine appearances for the club in Serie A in the following season. In June 2006, Empoli signed him outright from Vicenza, for an additional €125,000 fee, making Empoli had paid Vicenza €796,400 in total.

=== Ascoli ===
After acquiring the remaining 50% registration rights from Vicenza in June 2006 for an additional €125,000 transfer fee, Empoli sold Zanetti to Ascoli in another co-ownership deal for €400,000 transfer fee in July.

=== Torino ===
In May 2007, Zanetti said he would stay on at Ascoli, despite them being relegated to Serie B. Ascoli bought the full registration rights of the player for an additional €750,000 fee, (making the amount Ascoli had paid €1.15 million in total) but sent Zanetti, along with Saša Bjelanović, to Torino in another co-ownership deals for €1 million fee each, in a five-year and three-year contract respectively. In the middle of same season, Torino bought him outright for an additional €500,000 (making the amount that Torino paid Ascoli for Zanetti €1.5 million in total) and Bjelanović was also bought by Torino for an additional €60,000 in June 2008.

During 2009–10 season, the ultras of Torino attacked the players during David Di Michele's birthday party. After the incident, the players involved - Di Michele, Massimo Loviso, Riccardo Colombo, Aimo Diana, Marco Pisano, Francesco Pratali and Zanetti - were transferred to other clubs, and only Rolando Bianchi, Matteo Rubin and Angelo Ogbonna remained.

On 19 January 2010, Atalanta signed him on loan from Serie B club Torino until the end of the season.

=== Grosseto ===
After being inactive from football for a season, Zanetti joined Grosseto on 8 August 2011 in a one-year deal. Torino and Zanetti terminated the contract between the two parties by mutual consent.

=== Sorrento ===
In January 2012, he was signed by Sorrento. In May 2012 he signed a new two-year contract with Sorrento.

=== Reggiana ===
On 23 January 2013, he was signed by Reggiana. On 26 August 2013, he signed a new two-year contract. On 18 November 2014 Zanetti retired and became a backroom staff of the first team (Italian: collaboratore tecnico di Prima Squadra).

== International career ==
Zanetti was a player of Azzurrini in 2001 UEFA European Under-18 Championship qualification (Note: The event was renamed to U-19 from 2001 onward to reflect the age limit at the end of the season instead of the start of the season. i.e. age limit unchanged) He played twice. After the elimination of Italy from the competition, he also played for the U-19 team (de facto U-20 B) in two friendlies, against Netherlands (who still in the Euro U-19 competition) and Germany respectively in March and May 2001. In the 2001–02 season, he played 13 times for the U-20 team, including matches in a four nations tournament. In the following season, he played once for the U-21 team in 2004 UEFA European Under-21 Championship qualification as well as 3 friendlies. In his only competitive appearance in the U-21 Euro, he was a substitute of Samuele Dalla Bona. He played his final appearance in national team against Austria on 19 August 2003, another friendly match.

== Managerial career ==
After retiring, Zanetti stayed at Reggiana as a technical collaborator and then as a youth coach.

In 2017, Zanetti took on his first head coaching job at Serie C club Südtirol. After two seasons ended with two consecutive promotion playoff appearances, on 7 June 2019, he left Südtirol for Serie B club Ascoli. He was sacked by Ascoli on 27 January 2020 following a 0–1 home loss to Frosinone that left the club in the bottom half of the Serie B league table.

On 27 May 2021, Zanetti secured Venezia's return to Serie A after a 2–1 aggregate win in the promotion play-off over Cittadella, thus ending their 19-year exile from the top flight. On 27 April 2022, Zanetti was sacked by the club following a run of eight straight defeats that saw Venezia bottom of the Serie A table.

On 6 June 2022, Serie A club Empoli, a former team of his as a player, announced they had hired Zanetti on a two-year deal as their new head coach. After guiding Empoli to a mid-table placement in the club's 2022–23 Serie A campaign, Zanetti was dismissed on 19 September 2023 following a dismal start to the new season, with four losses in the first four games and following a 0–7 defeat against Roma.

On 13 June 2024, Zanetti was unveiled as the new head coach of Hellas Verona, signing a one-year contract with an extension option for one further year. He was sacked on 1 February 2026.

On 2 November 2026, Zanetti was signed to be the head coach of Udinese, signing a one-year contract.

== Managerial statistics ==
As of match played 22 November 2026

Managerial record by team and tenure
Team	Nat.	From	To	Record							
Team	Nat.	From	To	G	W	D	L	GF	GA	GD	Win %
Südtirol	(Italy)	6 July 2017	7 June 2019	85	35	29	21	95	75	+20	41.18
Ascoli	(Italy)	7 June 2019	27 January 2020	24	10	3	11	37	34	+3	41.67
Venezia	(Italy)	14 August 2020	27 April 2022	81	25	25	31	96	111	−15	30.86
Empoli	(Italy)	1 July 2022	19 September 2023	44	10	13	21	39	65	−26	22.73
Hellas Verona	(Italy)	12 June 2024	1 February 2026	64	12	17	35	54	110	−56	18.75
Udinese	(Italy)	2 November 2026	present	2	0	1	1	2	3	−1	0.00
Total				300	92	88	120	323	398	−75	30.67
