= Marco Pisano =

Italian footballer (born 1981)

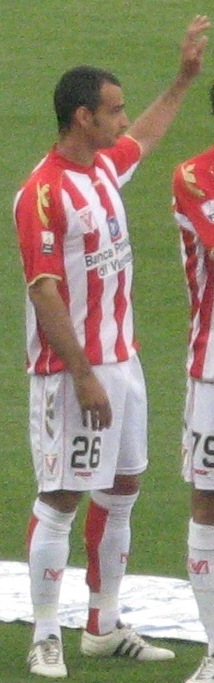
- Marco Giovanni Pisano with Vicenza in 2014

Personal information
- Full name: Marco Giovanni Pisano
- Date of birth: 13 August 1981 (age 45)
- Place of birth: Rome, Italy
- Height: 1.74 m (5 ft 9 in)
- Position: Left back

Youth career
- 1998–1999: Lazio
- 2000: Brescia

Senior career*
Years	Team	Apps	(Gls)
2000–2004	Brescia	26	(0)
2000–2001	→ Ascoli (loan)	8	(0)
2001–2002	→ Taranto (loan)	26	(0)
2004–2006	Sampdoria	61	(0)
2006–2008	Palermo	39	(0)
2008	→ Torino (loan)	14	(0)
2008–2010	Torino	27	(0)
2010	→ Bari (loan)	1	(0)
2010–2011	Parma	5	(0)
2011–2014	Vicenza	33	(0)
2014	Venezia	2	(0)
Total		242	(0)

International career
2003	Italy U21	5	(0)
- * Club domestic league appearances and goals

Marco Giovanni Pisano (born 13 August 1981) is an Italian former professional footballer who plays as a left back.

== Career ==
=== Early career ===
Pisano started his career at S.S. Lazio youth team. He joined Brescia of Serie B in January 2000, exchanged with Mauro Coppini. He was on loan to Serie C1 clubs in 2000–01 & 2001–02 seasons. He made his Serie A debut for Brescia on 20 October 2002, against Bologna.

In summer 2004, he joined UC Sampdoria.

=== Palermo ===
In June 2006, Pisano was involved in a 5 men swap deal with Palermo: Palermo signed including Aimo Diana (€5M), and Pisano (€4M) in 4-year contracts; Sampdoria signed Massimo Bonanni (50% for €2M), left back Pietro Accardi (€2M) and Christian Terlizzi (50% for €1.5M) in return. Pisano replaced departed Fabio Grosso as left back.

=== Torino ===
In January 2008, Pisano along with Diana (tagged for €1.2 million), were transferred to Torino FC, in a temporary deal and a definitive deal respectively. At the end of season Torino bought Pisano for €1.5 million in a 3-year deal.

During 2009–10 season, Ultras of Torino attacked the players during David Di Michele's birthday party. After the incident the players involved: Di Michele, Massimo Loviso, Riccardo Colombo, Aimo Diana, Pisano, Francesco Pratali, Paolo Zanetti were transferred to other clubs and only Rolando Bianchi, Matteo Rubin and Angelo Ogbonna were remained.

On 27 January 2010 Bari signed the left-back on loan from Torino, the midfielder Filippo Antonelli has gone the other way. However, Pisano managed to play only one single game with Bari during his time at the club. Despite only an appearance, Torino also paid Bari €120,000 as a premium (Italian: premi di valorizzazione).

=== Parma ===
On 2 August 2010, Pisano signed by Parma F.C. for free (at the same time Filipe Oliveira moved to Turin in a temporary deal for €600,000; Pisano's transfer also cost Parma a small fee), but Pisano made just 5 league appearances as his chances at left-back were restricted by Luca Antonelli in the first half of the season and Massimo Gobbi in the second.

=== Vicenza ===
In July 2011, Parma F.C. signed Raffaele Schiavi for €750,000 and sold Pisano to Vicenza Calcio for €150,000 in a 3-year contract. In 2013 Vicenza was relegated to 2013–14 Lega Pro Prima Divisione. Pisano failed to play any game for the club despite still under contract.

=== Venezia ===
On 31 January 2014 Pisano was signed by Football Club Unione Venezia for free.
