= Francesco Pratali =

Italian footballer

Personal information
- Date of birth: 17 January 1979 (age 47)
- Place of birth: Pontedera, Italy
- Height: 1.84 m (6 ft 0 in)
- Position: Defender

Youth career
- Empoli

Senior career*
Years	Team	Apps	(Gls)
1998–2001	Lodigiani	70	(3)
2001–2008	Empoli	144	(2)
2008–2012	Torino	55	(3)
2010	→ Siena (loan)	12	(0)
2012–2014	Empoli	21	(2)
2015	Tuttoculo	3	(0)
2015	Jolly Montemurlo		
- * Club domestic league appearances and goals as of 14:30, 26 August 2016 (UTC)

Francesco Pratali (born 17 January 1979) is a retired Italian footballer who played as a defender.

During the 2009–10 season, ultras of Torino F.C. attacked the club's players during David Di Michele's birthday party. After the incident the players involved: Di Michele, Massimo Loviso, Riccardo Colombo, Aimo Diana, Marco Pisano, Pratali, Paolo Zanetti were transferred to other clubs; only Rolando Bianchi, Matteo Rubin and Angelo Ogbonna remained.
