= Aimo Diana =

Italian football manager (born 1978)

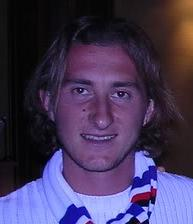
- Diana as a Sampdoria player

Personal information
- Full name: Aimo Stefano Diana
- Date of birth: 2 January 1978 (age 48)
- Place of birth: Brescia, Italy
- Height: 1.80 m (5 ft 11 in)
- Positions: Midfielder; right back

Team information
- Current team: Perugia (head coach)

Youth career
- Brescia

Senior career*
Years	Team	Apps	(Gls)
1996–2001	Brescia	93	(4)
1999–2000	Verona (co-ownership)	25	(0)
2001–2003	Parma	26	(1)
2003	→ Reggina (loan)	16	(1)
2003–2006	Sampdoria	94	(16)
2006–2007	Palermo	41	(2)
2008–2011	Torino	60	(3)
2010	→ Bellinzona (loan)	15	(0)
2011	Bellinzona	16	(0)
2011–2012	Lumezzane	29	(1)
2013	Trento	13	(1)
Total		415	(28)

International career
1998–2000	Italy U21	3	(0)
2004–2007	Italy	13	(1)

Managerial career
- 2015–2016: Feralpisalò
- 2016: Pavia
- 2017: Melfi
- 2017–2018: Sicula Leonzio
- 2018–2021: Renate
- 2021–2023: Reggiana
- 2023: Vicenza
- 2024–2025: Feralpisalò
- 2025: Union Brescia
- 2026–: Perugia
- * Club domestic league appearances and goals

Aimo Stefano Diana (Italian pronunciation: [ˈaimo ˈsteːfano ˈdjaːna]; born 2 January 1978) is an Italian football manager and a former player who is the head coach of Serie C Group B club Perugia. A player of wide range, he was capable of playing both as a wide midfielder or as a defender on the right flank.

== Club career ==
Born in Brescia, Diana is a product of Brescia Calcio's youth system. He made his debut for the first team in Serie B in 1997 and played his first Serie A game on 31 August of the same year against Inter Milan. He played one season with Verona in a co-ownership deal, helping the side to a final ninth position in the top level, and left for Parma A.C. in 2001.

Diana was used irregularly by the Emilia-Romagna side, winning the Italian Cup in his first season, but hardly featuring at all in 2002–03. In January 2003, he moved on loan to Reggina along with Emiliano Bonazzoli, posteriorly signing for U.C. Sampdoria at the end of the campaign. A key member from the start for the Genovese, he helped the team qualify for the UEFA Cup in his second year, scoring five goals in 32 matches; in early May 2005 he scored the game's only at Juventus FC and, the following week, also found the net, in a 3–0 home success against ACF Fiorentina.

In the 2006 summer, Diana signed for U.S. Città di Palermo for €5 million, with Sampdoria also selling Marco Pisano to the same club for €4 million and receiving Massimo Bonanni (50% for €2million), Pietro Accardi (€2 million) and Christian Terlizzi (50% for €1.5 million). He was regularly used in one 1/2 seasons and scored two goals, including the equalizer in a 2–1 home win by the Rosanero against A.C. Milan on 26 September 2007. On 30 January of the following year he was sold to Torino F.C. in a permanent move, for €1.2 million.

In early January 2010, ultras of Torino attacked club players during David Di Michele's birthday party. After the incident, Riccardo Colombo, Diana, Di Michele, Massimo Loviso, Marco Pisano, Francesco Pratali and Paolo Zanetti were transferred to other clubs, with only Rolando Bianchi, Angelo Ogbonna and Matteo Rubin remaining.

Diana joined AC Bellinzona in Switzerland on loan in early February 2010, making his Super League debut on the 21st in a 2–1 away loss against FC Luzern, eventually contributing solidly (15 matches, 14 starts) as the club narrowly retained its division status.

Subsequently, 32-year-old Diana returned to Torino. On 4 January 2011 he mutually terminated his contract, re-signing for Bellinzona (on a permanent basis) the following day.

== International career ==
After impressing Sampdoria, Diana received his first call-up to the Italy national team, making his debut in a friendly match with Spain on 28 April 2004.

A regular for the Azzurri under Marcello Lippi, an injury prevented him from being picked to the squad at the 2006 FIFA World Cup in Germany. On 2 June 2007, in his last appearance, Diana assisted on Filippo Inzaghi's second goal against the Faroe Islands, in a 2–1 away win for the UEFA Euro 2008 qualifying.

== Managerial career ==
After retiring, Diana became a youth coach at Feralpisalò, being successively promoted to head coach in November 2015. He completed the season in eighth place in the 2015–16 Lega Pro, not being confirmed for the following year.

In August 2016, he was hired new head coach of Pavia, but resigned shortly thereafter, following the club's exclusion from Serie D due to financial issues. In February 2017, he was signed by Lega Pro club Melfi, failing to escape relegation by the end of the season.

He returned into management in December 2017 as the new boss of Sicilian Serie C club Sicula Leonzio.

On 20 November 2018, he was appointed head coach of Serie C club Renate, in the relegation spot at the time. He guided Renate for three full seasons, the last of which ended with Renate topping the league for a long time until losing out to more renowned teams such as Como and Alessandria, and then losing to second-placed Girone B club Padova in the promotion playoffs. Following that, Diana agreed to leave Renate and accepted to join recently-relegated Serie C club Reggiana on a one-year deal, with an option of further extension in case of promotion to Serie B.

After guiding Reggiana to win promotion to Serie B as 2022–23 Serie C Group B champions, Diana left the Emilian club by the end of the season. On 27 June 2023, he was announced as the new head coach of ambitious Serie C club LR Vicenza. He was dismissed from his role on 18 December 2023 after a negative first half of the season that left Vicenza far from first place in the league table.

On 20 June 2024, Diana agreed to return to Feralpisalò, signing a two-year contract with the Serie C club, with Emanuele Filippini as his assistant. Following Feralpisalò's relocation to Brescia under the new denomination of Union Brescia, Diana stayed in at the new club, but was dismissed on 8 December 2025, with the team in third place in the league.

On 4 August 2026, Diana was hired as the head coach of Perugia in Serie C on a contract until June 2028.

== Personal life ==
In 2016, Diana ran for office as a candidate for the city council of Flero, his town of residence, as part of a civic list backing the local Democratic Party mayor.

== Career statistics ==
Scores and results list Italy's goal tally first.

No	Date	Venue	Opponent	Score	Result	Competition
1.	16 November 2005	Stade de Genève, Geneva, Switzerland	Ivory Coast	1–1	1–1	Friendly

== Managerial statistics ==
As of match played 17 December 2023

Managerial record by team and tenure
Team	Nat	From	To	Record							
Team	Nat	From	To	G	W	D	L	GF	GA	GD	Win %
FeralpiSalò	(Italy)	4 November 2015	10 May 2016	26	11	5	10	40	35	+5	42.31
Pavia	(Italy)	2 August 2016	12 August 2016	0	0	0	0	0	0	+0	—
Melfi	(Italy)	20 February 2017	30 June 2017	14	5	4	5	12	16	−4	35.71
Sicula Leonzio	(Italy)	5 December 2017	17 June 2018	21	8	7	6	24	18	+6	38.10
Renate	(Italy)	20 November 2018	4 June 2021	101	40	33	28	113	94	+19	39.60
Reggiana	(Italy)	4 June 2021	26 May 2023	83	49	21	13	141	66	+75	59.04
Vicenza	(Italy)	26 June 2023	18 December 2023	22	9	6	7	29	23	+6	40.91
Total				267	122	76	69	359	252	+107	45.69

== Honours ==
=== Player ===
Parma

- Coppa Italia: 2001–02

=== Manager ===
Reggiana

- Serie C: 2022–23
