= Riccardo Colombo =

Italian footballer

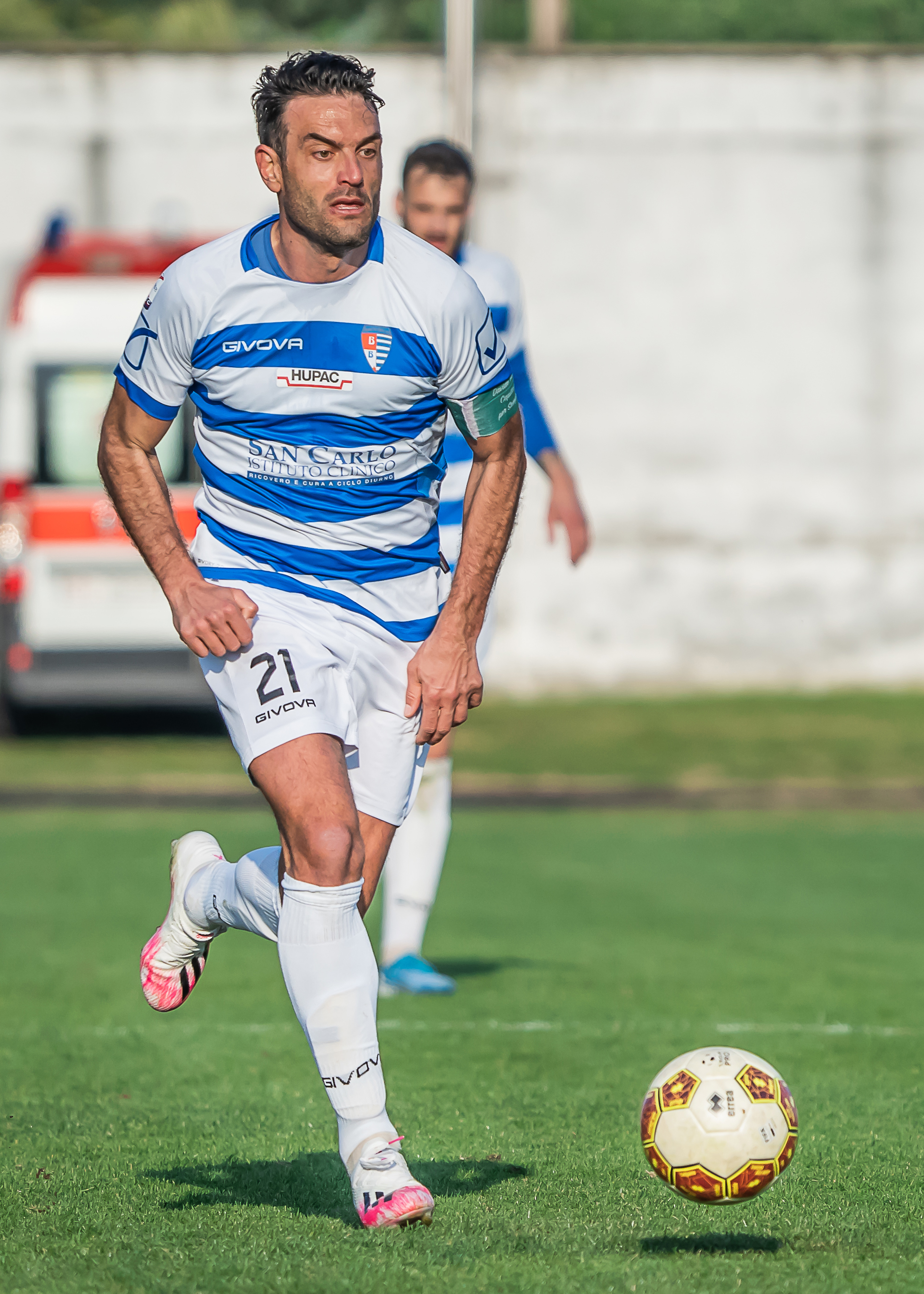

Personal information
- Date of birth: 1 December 1982 (age 43)
- Place of birth: Varese, Italy
- Height: 1.83 m (6 ft 0 in)
- Positions: Full-back; wing-back

Youth career
- 1999–2000: Pro Patria

Senior career*
Years	Team	Apps	(Gls)
2000–2003	Pro Patria	34	(0)
2003–2008	AlbinoLeffe	128	(3)
2008	→ Udinese (loan)	4	(0)
2008–2010	Torino	33	(1)
2010	→ Triestina (loan)	10	(0)
2010–2012	Reggina	50	(2)
2013	Novara	17	(0)
2013–2014	Cittadella	23	(0)
2014–2016	Salernitana	61	(4)
2016–2022	Pro Patria	138	(10)

Managerial career
- 2023–2025: Pro Patria
- * Club domestic league appearances and goals

Riccardo Colombo (born 1 December 1982) is an Italian former footballer who played as a defender, and current coach.

== Playing career ==
In the 2008–09 season, Colombo played three games in the 2008–09 Coppa Italia.

During the 2009–10 season, ultras of Torino attacked the players during David Di Michele's birthday party. After the incident the players involved: Di Michele, Massimo Loviso, Riccardo Colombo, Aimo Diana, Marco Pisano, Francesco Pratali, Paolo Zanetti were transferred to other clubs and only Rolando Bianchi, Matteo Rubin and Angelo Ogbonna were remained.

On 26 November 2016, Colombo returned to Pro Patria. After five seasons with the club, on 27 June 2021 Colombo announced his retirement. Colombo returned to playing for one more season to play in the 2021–22 Serie C, before retiring for good.

== Coaching career ==
After retirement, Colombo stayed at Pro Patria, working alongside head coach Jorge Vargas as his assistant. On 7 July 2023, Colombo was promoted to head coach.

On 27 January 2025, Colombo resigned from his post in charge of Pro Patria with immediate effect.
