= Pietro Accardi =

Italian former professional footballer

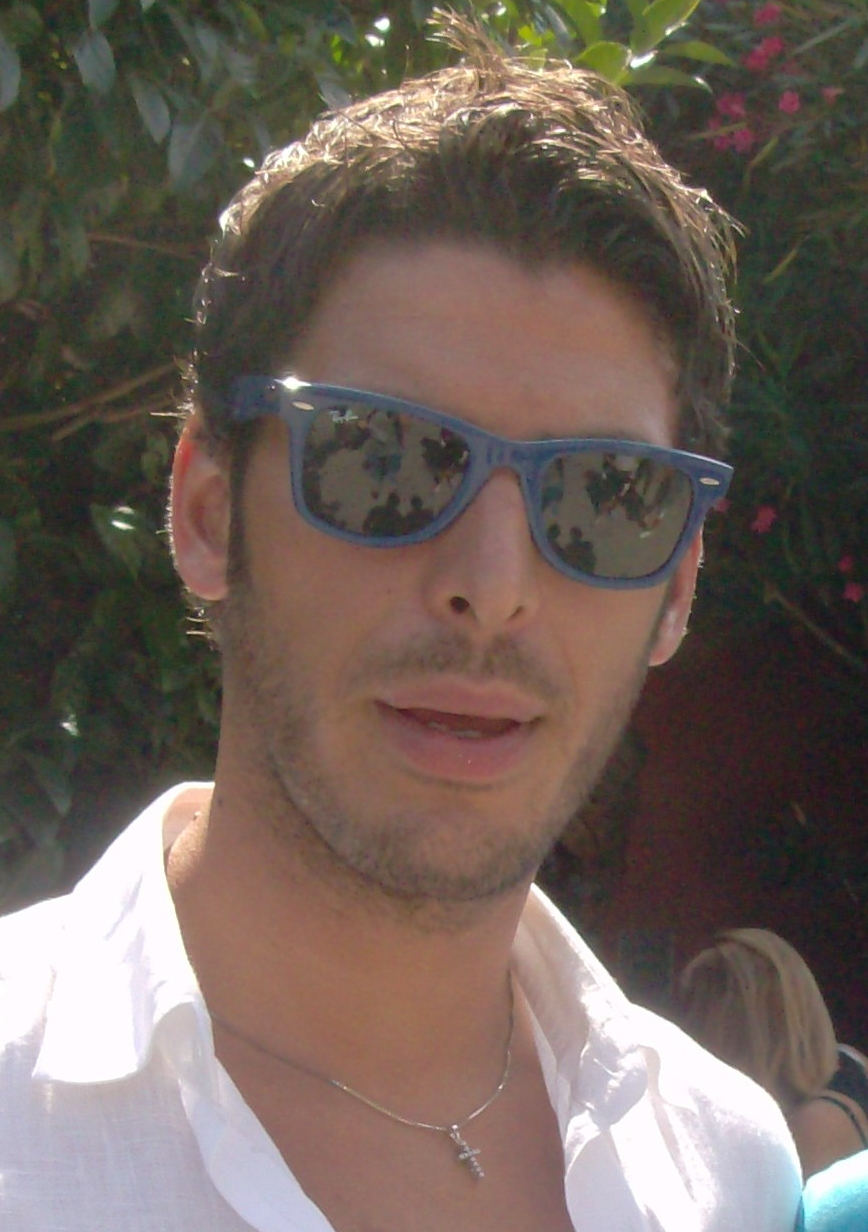

Personal information
- Date of birth: 12 September 1982 (age 44)
- Place of birth: Palermo, Italy
- Height: 1.76 m (5 ft 9 in)
- Position: Defender

Youth career
- –1992: Villaggio Santa Rosalia
- 1992–1996: Palermo
- 1996–1999: Marsala

Senior career*
Years	Team	Apps	(Gls)
1999–2000	Marsala	14	(1)
2000–2006	Palermo	70	(0)
2006–2012	Sampdoria	108	(1)
2011	→ Brescia (loan)	8	(1)
2012	Brescia	1	(0)
2012–2014	Empoli	18	(0)
Total		219	(3)

Managerial career
- 2014–2016: Empoli (team manager)
- 2016–2024: Empoli (sporting director)
- 2024–2025: Sampdoria (sporting director)
- * Club domestic league appearances and goals

Pietro Accardi (born 12 September 1982) is an Italian former professional footballer who played as a defender.

== Playing career ==
=== Palermo ===
Born in Palermo, Sicily, Accardi started his senior career with Serie C1 side Marsala. In 2000, he left for Franco Sensi's Palermo and played two seasons in their youth teams. Following the club's takeover by Maurizio Zamparini in 2002 and despite the arrival of several players from Venezia, Accardi secured a place in the starting line-up at the start of 2002–03 Serie B season and won promotion to Serie A in 2004.

He also received several call-ups from Italy U21 Serie B team for training sessions from 2002 to 2004. He was pulled out from the squad by injury before the match against Belgium U21.

In the 2004–05 Serie A season, the club signed Fabio Grosso, and Accardi worked as Grosso's understudy.

=== Sampdoria ===
In 2006–07 Serie A season, Palermo sold both Grosso and Accardi. Accardi (€2 million), along with midfielder Massimo Bonanni (50% for €2 million) and centre-back Christian Terlizzi (50% for €1.5 million) moved to Sampdoria, which as the piece-weight to sign midfielder Aimo Diana (€5 million) and left-back Marco Pisano (€4 million).

Accardi immediately became one of the starting XI for the Genoa based club. He was injured in the 2007–08 UEFA Cup 2nd qualifying round, ruling him out until November.

In the 2009–10 Serie A season, he lost his place in the starting line-up to Reto Ziegler.

After the club's relegation to Serie B and the departure of Ziegler, he re-took the starting place.

=== Empoli ===
On 22 September 2012, he joined Empoli until summer 2013.

== Post-playing career ==
In 2014, Accardi was appointed as the team manager of Empoli. Two years later, he was promoted as the club's new sporting director. After ten years at Empoli in total, Accardi left the Tuscanian club in June 2024 to become the new sporting director of Sampdoria, with the aim to rebuild a squad to bring the club back to Serie A.

== Honours ==
Palermo

- Serie B: 2003–04
- Serie C1: 2000–01

Sampdoria

- Coppa Italia runner-up: 2008–09
- UEFA Intertoto Cup: 2007
