= Marco Bernacci =

Italian footballer

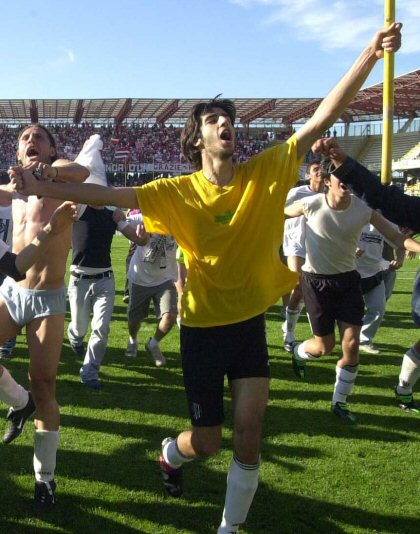
- Bernacci in 2004

Personal information
- Date of birth: 15 December 1983 (age 42)
- Place of birth: Cesena, Italy
- Height: 1.93 m (6 ft 4 in)
- Position: Forward

Senior career*
Years	Team	Apps	(Gls)
2001–2006	Cesena	117	(26)
2006–2007	Mantova	30	(6)
2007–2008	Ascoli	38	(16)
2008–2012	Bologna	13	(1)
2009–2010	→ Ascoli (loan)	19	(11)
2010	→ Torino (loan)	1	(0)
2011–2012	→ Modena (loan)	14	(1)
2012	→ Livorno (loan)	14	(2)
2012–2013	Bellaria	26	(8)
2013–2014	Forlì	18	(3)
2014–2015	Bellaria	25	(10)
2015–2017	Ribelle	56	(20)
2017–2018	Tre Fiori	23	(15)
2018–2019	Cava Ronco		
2019–2020	Diegaro		
2020–2021	Libertas	6	(4)
2021–2022	Gambettola		

Managerial career
- 2022–2025: Gambettola
- 2025–: Cervia
- * Club domestic league appearances and goals

Marco Bernacci (born 15 December 1983) is an Italian football coach and former footballer who is currently as a head coach for Cervia.

== Playing career ==
A youth product of hometown club Cesena, Bernacci helped the team through the 2004 Serie C1 playoffs, earning the side promotion to Serie B.

In summer 2006, he joined A.C. Mantova in a joint-ownership bid for €1.7 million. After the arrival of Denis Godeas in January 2007 and Giorgio Corona in July 2007, he was out-favoured by Mantova and was sold to Ascoli, on 31 July 2007, for €1.55 million (€150,000 went to Cesena and €1.4 million to Mantova). Cesena still retained 50% registration rights.

On 15 June 2008, he was sold to Bologna from Ascoli which had won promotion to Serie A. Ascoli bought Cesena's portion for €1.8 million and sold to Bologna for undisclosed fee. He successively spent loan periods back at Ascoli, and a one-month stay at Torino F.C. as part of a loan exchange with Matteo Rubin. On 26 August 2010 it was revealed that Bernacci had unilaterally rescinded his contract due to depression and quit football altogether on a temporary basis. Bernacci later returned to football and was loaned once again by Bologna to Modena for the 2011–12 Serie B season.

He was released in July 2012. On 31 August 2012 he was signed by Bellaria of the fourth division. In July 2013 he moved to Forlì in 2-year contract, another Lega Pro Seconda Divisione club.

On 9 July 2014 the contract was terminated from mutual consent. Bernacci then moved back to Bellaria on 22 July.

Almost a year after Bernacci's return to Bellaria on 1 July 2015, he joined Ribelle for free. This was followed by a number of experiences with amateurs teams of Emilia-Romagna and San Marino.

== Coaching career ==
On 4 March 2022, Bernacci, then a player for Promozione amateurs Gambettola, retired from active football in order to take the head coach role at the same club.
