= Christian Terlizzi =

Italian footballer (born 1979)

Personal information
- Full name: Christian Terlizzi
- Date of birth: 22 November 1979 (age 46)
- Place of birth: Rome, Italy
- Height: 1.94 m (6 ft 4 1/2 in)
- Position: Defender

Youth career
- A.S. Lodigiani

Senior career*
Years	Team	Apps	(Gls)
1996–1998	A.S. Lodigiani	3	(0)
1998–1999	→ Tivoli (loan)	24	(4)
1999–2000	Castelli Romani	18	(3)
2000–2001	Selargius	9	(0)
2001	Termoli	8	(0)
2001–2002	Teramo	21	(1)
2002–2003	Cesena	28	(1)
2003–2006	Palermo	48	(6)
2006–2007	Sampdoria	4	(0)
2007–2011	Catania	73	(3)
2011–2012	Varese	33	(6)
2012–2013	Pescara	11	(2)
2013	→ Siena (loan)	9	(0)
2013–2015	Trapani	63	(6)
2017–2018	Polisportiva Paceco		
2018–	Marsala		

International career
2006	Italy	1	(0)
- * Club domestic league appearances and goals as of 14:42, 21 November 2018 (UTC)

Christian Terlizzi (Italian pronunciation: [ˈkristjan terˈlittsi]; born 22 November 1979) is an Italian former professional footballer who last played for Marsala as a defender. He played for clubs on all professional levels of Italian football, including U.S. Città di Palermo, U.C. Sampdoria, and Catania Calcio in the Serie A. He has also been capped for the Italy national football team.

== Club career ==
=== Cisco Roma ===
Terlizzi began his professional career within the youth ranks of A.S. Lodigiani, in 1990. He was often called up to the first team in 1996, and made his professional debut that same year. After making just 3 first team appearances in 2 seasons, Terlizzi was sent out on loan to amateur side Tivoli Calcio, and made 24 league appearances in his lone season with the club, also scoring 4 goals. In mid-1999, he returned to A.S. Lodigiani, but was simultaneously sold to A.S. Castelli Romani prior to the 1999–2000 Lega Calcio season.

=== 1999–2002 ===
Following his transfer, Terlizzi made 18 league appearances, scoring 3 goals in just 4 months, and was sold to Selargius Calcio. In another brief spell, at the Serie D club, Terlizzi made 9 starts, and was soon sold to U.S. Termoli, where he made a further 8 appearances, and made his move back into the Serie C, in 2001, with Teramo Calcio. In June 2001, Terlizzi completed his transfer to Teramo Calcio, and in his lone season with the Serie C2 club, he played in 21 league matches, and scored a single goal. Following an impressive season, at the heart of the defense, the 22-year-old Terlizzi, was sold to Serie A side, Parma F.C.

=== Parma ===
In June 2002, he was signed by Parma F.C. along with Florian Myrtaj, but was instantly sold to Serie C1 side, A.C. Cesena in co-ownership deal.

=== Cesena ===
Following his brief stay in Parma, Terlizzi returned to the lower divisions, with A.C. Cesena. He earned a guaranteed starting spot for much of the 2002–2003 league season, and went on to make over 30 appearances, also netting 2 goals, in all competitions. He was set to return to Parma F.C. in the summer of 2003, albeit interest from several lesser Serie A clubs, as well as a host of Serie B club, however, in July 2003, he joined then-Serie B club, U.S. Città di Palermo.

=== Palermo ===
In the summer of 2003 Terlizzi transferred to U.S. Città di Palermo, where he made 12 first team appearances in his first season, helping the club gain promotion to the Serie A. He made his Serie A debut at the age of 25, during the 2004–05 season. Terlizzi made an additional 14 league appearances during the season, and scored 1 goal. He remained with Palermo for the 2005–2006 Serie A season, and despite the sale of star striker Luca Toni, the Sicilian club still managed a 7th-place finish in the league. Terlizzi made 21 appearances during that season, and managed an impressive 5 goals, as a central defender. He, along with Fabio Grosso, were both sold in the summer of 2006, following bids from U.C. Sampdoria, and Inter Milan respectively.

=== Sampdoria ===
In summer 2006, he was signed by U.C. Sampdoria in a co-ownership bid, for €1.5 million, along with Pietro Accardi (€2 million) and Massimo Bonanni (50% for €2 million), as part of the deal that saw Aimo Diana (€5 million) and Marco Pisano (€4 million) transfer in the opposite direction. Terlizzi made his Italy national team debut, and only international appearance, in a friendly match against Croatia, on 16 August 2006, together with Sampdoria teammates Giulio Falcone, Gennaro Delvecchio and Angelo Palombo, in a 0–2 loss under new manager Roberto Donadoni. For Sampdoria, however he just played 4 league games, in part due to an injury-ridden season. He was then sold to Calcio Catania prior to the 2007–08 Serie A season.

=== Catania ===
He officially transferred to Calcio Catania on 5 July 2007, for €1.5 million. In his first season with the Sicilian giants, Terlizzi became a major part of the Catania first team, proving his worth with the Sicilian club. In his first season with the club, he made 25 league appearances, and formed an impressive central defensive partnership with Lorenzo Stovini. The duo held their positions during the 2008–2009 Serie A season as well, under new coach Walter Zenga, and Terlizzi made an additional 20 league appearances. His first team position was in the limbo following the 2008 purchase of Argentine youngster Matías Silvestre. During the 2008–2009 summer transfer window, Terlizzi nearly transferred to Italian giants, Juventus, but the deal never materialized. Prior to the 2009–10 Serie A season, Stovini left the club, and Terlizzi was relegated to the bench in favor of new signing Nicolás Spolli, who partnered Silvestre for much of the 2009–10 Serie A season. Under Siniša Mihajlović, however, Terlizzi managed to earn back his starting position alongside Silvestre, and went on to total 25 appearances for Catania in all 2009–10 competitions, helping the club to the semi-finals of the Coppa Italia, and also to a record points total in Serie A for the Sicilians, finishing in 12th places. Terlizzi has scored 2 goals in 8 games during the current campaign.

=== Later years ===
On 2 August 2011, Terlizzi signed a two-year contract with the Serie B club A.S. Varese 1910. However, after a good season, he returns to play in Serie A with Pescara. He successively spent the second part of the season on loan to another Serie A club, Siena.

In August 2013 he was signed as a free agent by newly promoted Serie B club Trapani.

== International career ==
After earning his first senior international call-up under manager Roberto Donadoni in August 2006, Terlizzi made his only cap for the Italy national football team on 16 August, in a 2–0 friendly defeat against Croatia, in Livorno.
