= Fabrizio Grillo =

Italian footballer

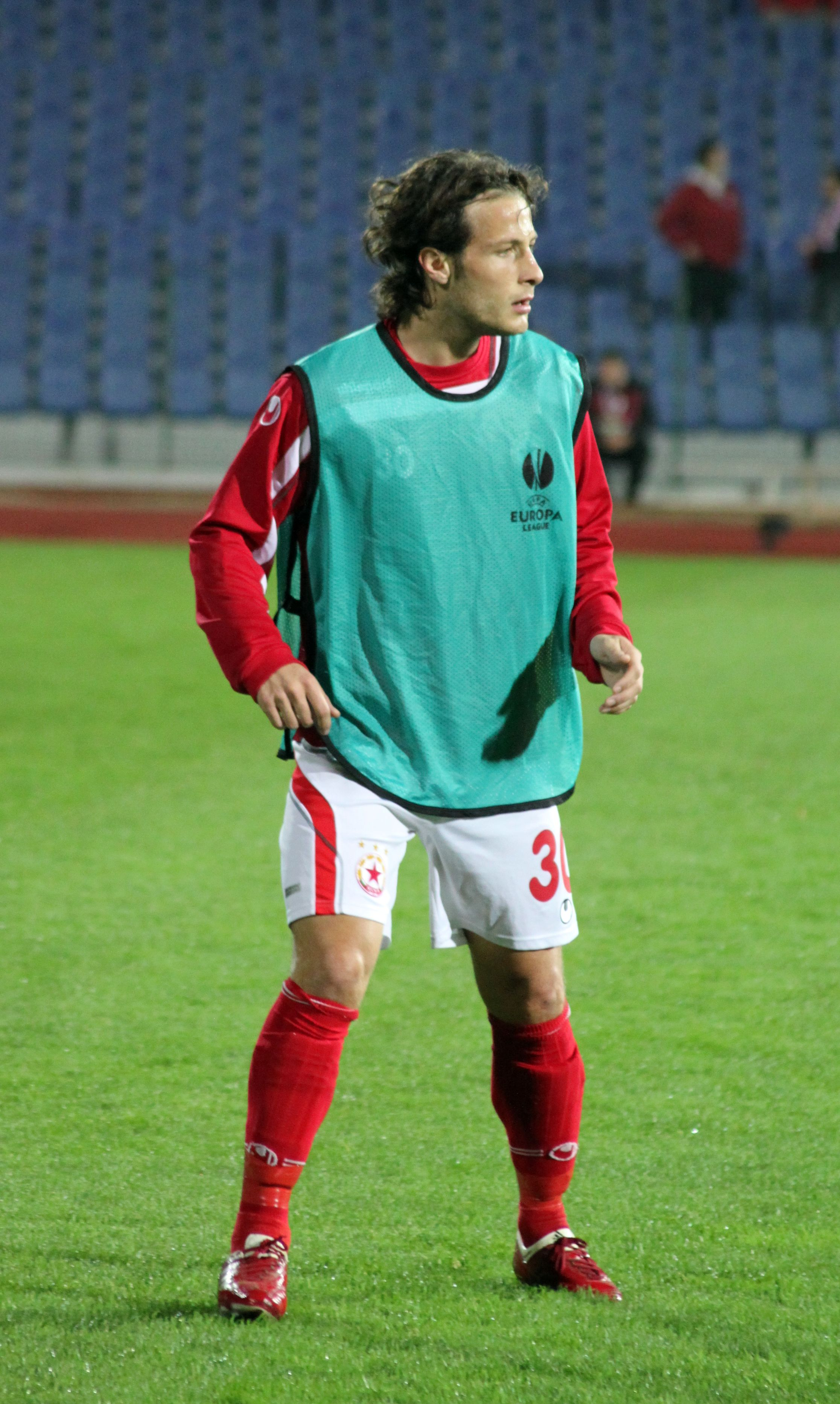

Personal information
- Date of birth: 2 February 1987 (age 39)
- Place of birth: Rome, Italy
- Height: 1.77 m (5 ft 9 1/2 in)
- Positions: Left back; left winger

Team information
- Current team: Atletico Lariano

Youth career
- 2000–2001: Lazio
- 2001–2006: Roma

Senior career*
Years	Team	Apps	(Gls)
2006–2007	Roma	0	(0)
2007	→ Sambenedettese (loan)	13	(0)
2007–2010	Arezzo	39	(1)
2009–2010	→ Crotone (loan)	18	(0)
2010–2011	CSKA Sofia	3	(0)
2011–2013	Varese	58	(0)
2013–2014	Siena	11	(2)
2014	→ Varese (loan)	17	(0)
2014–2016	Pescara	12	(0)
2016	Pavia	6	(0)
2016–2017	Livorno	2	(0)
2017	→ Sambenedettese (loan)	6	(0)
2017–2018	Triestina	14	(0)
2019–	Atletico Lariano		

International career
2001	Italy U-15	1	(0)
2003	Italy U-16	4	(0)
2001–2004	Italy U-17	4	(0)
- * Club domestic league appearances and goals as of 2 March 2018

Fabrizio Grillo (born 2 February 1987) is an Italian former footballer who last played for ASD Atletico Lariano 1963. He was a left back but could also play as a left winger. He is a former Italy U-17 international.

== Club career ==
Grillo began playing football at joined Lazio academy, he left them in 2001 to join rivals Roma, becoming a member of the first team squad at age 16.

Before a loan spell at Sambenedettese he left Roma to join Arezzo in 2007, where he played 39 games. He joined Crotone on loan during the 2009–10 season, playing 18 times. In 2010, he moved to Bulgarian side CSKA Sofia, where he plays in the UEFA Europa League, debuting September 30, 2010 in the home game against FC Porto, the game finished 0–1. Grillo was part of the squad which won the Bulgarian Cup under manager Milen Radukanov.

In summer 2011 signed a three-year deal with Serie B side Varese.

=== Siena ===
After impressing at Varese, In January 2013, Grillo joined Serie A side Siena on a co-ownership deal. He made his debut against Juventus in Serie A. On May 12, 2013 in the 2–1 loss against S.S.C. Napoli, Grillo scored his first goal in the top flight with a left footed strike. However, Siena were relegated to Serie B at the end of the 2012/13 season.

In January 2014, Grillo rejoined Varese on loan until the end of the season, helping Varese stay in the division after beating Novara in the relegation playoffs. After returning from loan, Grillo was released by Siena with Siena later announcing they were bankrupt. Siena also received the remaining 50% registration rights of Grillo from Varese.

=== Pescara ===
In August 2014, Grillo revealed after interest from Leeds United F.C. and Wolverhampton Wanderers F.C. that he had joined Pescara. He was assigned number 33 shirt.

=== Pavia ===
Grillo failed to play any game in 2015–16 Serie B. On 7 January 2016 Grillo was signed by Pavia in a definitive deal.

=== Livorno and Sambenedettese ===
After the bankruptcy of Pavia, Grillo joined Livorno as a free agent. In January 2017 he was transferred to Sambenedettese on a temporary deal.

=== Triestina ===
On 24 August 2017 he was signed by Triestina.

=== Later career ===
On 12 July 2019, Grillo joined Atletico Lariano.

== International career ==
Grillo was capped by Italy, from Italy U-15 to Italy U-17 level.

== Honours ==
- Bulgarian Cup 2010/11 with CSKA Sofia
