= Stadio Artemio Franchi – Montepaschi Arena =

Multi-purpose stadium in Siena, Italy

Coordinates: 43°19′18″N 11°19′34″E

Montepaschi Arena
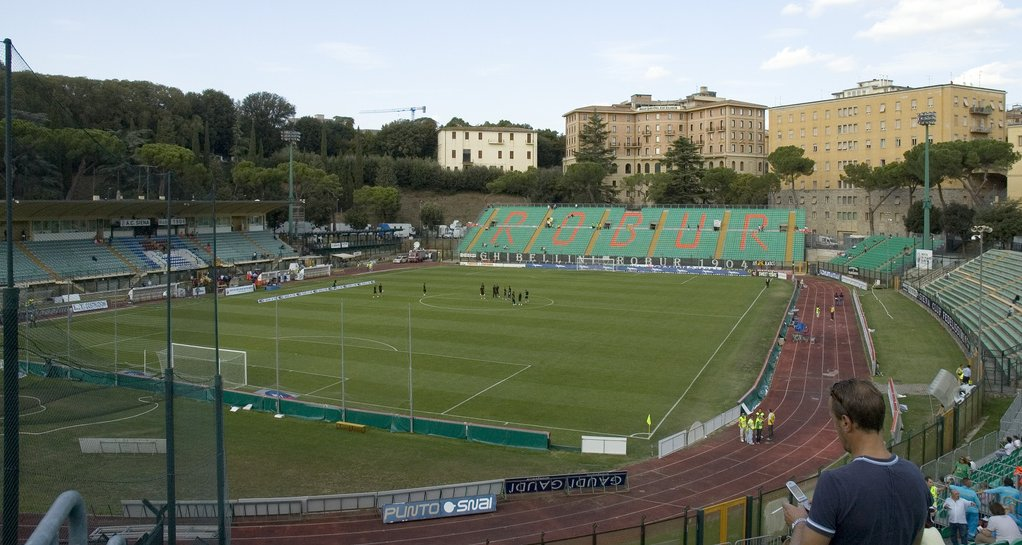
- Interactive map of Montepaschi Arena
- Location: Siena, Italy
- Owner: Municipality of Siena
- Capacity: 15,373
- Surface: Grass

Construction
- Groundbreaking: 1923
- Opened: 1923

Tenants
- Siena F.C. Italy national football team (selected matches)

Stadio Artemio Franchi is a multi-purpose stadium in Siena, Italy. It is currently used mostly for football matches and the home of A.C.N. Siena. It was built in 1923 and holds 15,373.

It is named after former Italian Football Federation president Artemio Franchi.

In summer 2007, A.C. Siena agreed to rename the stadium 'Stadio Artemio Franchi – Montepaschi Arena', to include the name of their main sponsor, Banca Monte dei Paschi di Siena.

The stadium hosted its first and so far only international match on 17 October 2010, a 2–0 friendly win for Italy over South Africa.

During March 2011, A.C. Siena announced plans to build a new stadium on the southern outskirts of the city at Isola d'Arbia. The new stadium, with a capacity of 20,000, features a revolutionary below-ground design which was honoured with an MIPIM AR Future Projects Award.
