= Massimo Bonanni =

Italian footballer

Personal information
- Date of birth: 10 June 1982 (age 44)
- Place of birth: Rome, Italy
- Height: 1.90 m (6 ft 3 in)
- Position: Midfielder

Team information
- Current team: A.S. Ostia Mare Lido Calcio (youth)

Youth career
- 1999–2001: Roma

Senior career*
Years	Team	Apps	(Gls)
2001–2004	Roma	0	(0)
2001–2002	→ Viterbese (loan)	29	(1)
2002–2003	→ Panachaiki (loan)	24	(0)
2003–2004	→ Vicenza (loan)	26	(3)
2004–2005	Vicenza	38	(8)
2005–2006	Palermo	18	(2)
2006	→ Lazio (loan)	9	(0)
2006–2009	Sampdoria	8	(0)
2007	→ Ascoli (loan)	14	(2)
2007–2008	→ Bari (loan)	31	(5)
2009	→ Grosseto (loan)	16	(2)
2009–2011	Pescara	35	(6)
2011–2012	Lugano	28	(5)
2012–2014	Genoa	0	(0)
2012–2013	→ Grosseto (loan)	14	(0)
2013	→ Lugano (loan)	15	(1)

International career
2000–2001	Italy U-18	2	(0)

Managerial career
- 2015–2017: La Rustica
- 2017–2020: Ostiamare (youth)
- 2020: Ostiamare
- 2021–: Ostiamare (youth)
- * Club domestic league appearances and goals

Massimo Bonanni (born 10 June 1982) is an Italian football coach and a former player who played as a midfielder.

== Football career ==
Bonanni started his career at A.S. Roma youth system. He spent on loan to Viterbese, Panachaiki and Vicenza.

Vicenza bought half of the player registration rights for €200,000 after a season long loan.

On 27 June 2005, he was bought back by Roma, for €500,000, and sold to Palermo on 1 July 2005, for €750,000 (the fee of signing Cesare Bovo on loan).

He made his Serie A debut against Parma F.C. on 28 August 2005. He played 4 games in UEFA Cup and 18 in Serie A before on loan to S.S. Lazio on 31 January 2006. U.C. Sampdoria acquired half of the player registration rights on 14 July 2006, for €2 million, along with Christian Terlizzi (50% for €1.5 million), as part of the Aimo Diana's transfer (€5 million).

He played 7 games in Serie A and 4 in Coppa Italia for Sampdoria, before loaned to Ascoli on 12 January 2007. On 17 August 2007, Bonanni is on a one-year loan to Bari of Serie B. He returned to Genoa, but after played once in 2008–09 season, he left for Grosseto of Serie B. In June 2009 Palermo gave up the remain 50% registration rights to Sampdoria

On 31 July 2009, he signed a three-year contract with Pescara of Prima Divisione for free.

On 12 July 2011, he signed a two-year contract with Swiss Challenge League side FC Lugano on free transfer.

On 6 April 2012, he returned to Italy for Lugano's sister club Genoa (effective on 1 July 2012), however the sole purpose was transferred €1.45 million "transfer fee" to Lugano. He left for Serie B club U.S. Grosseto F.C. on 31 August 2012 but returned to Switzerland on 9 January 2013, in temporary deal from Genoa.
