= Matteo Rubin =

Italian footballer (born 1987)

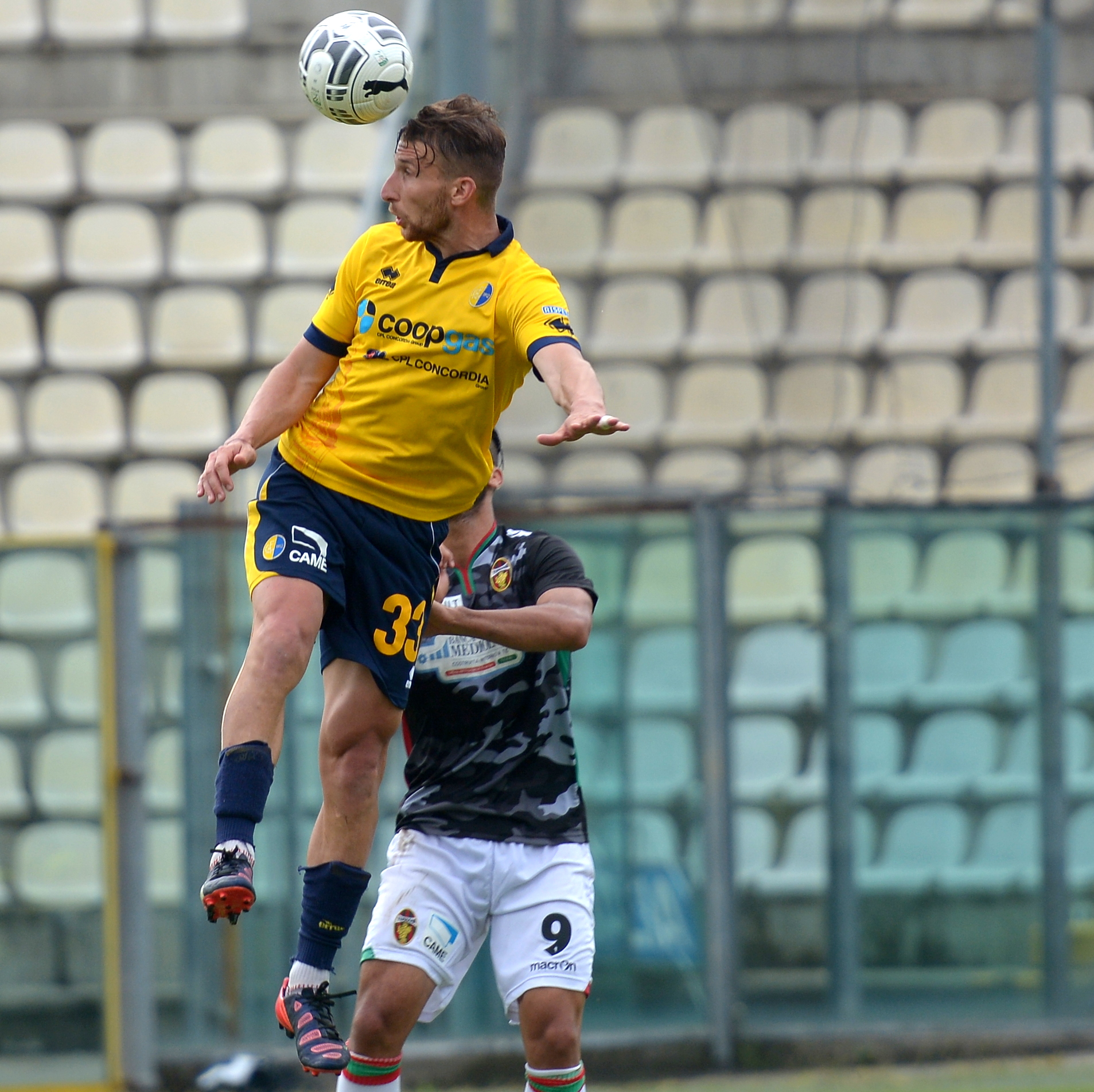
- Rubin in 2015

Personal information
- Date of birth: 9 July 1987 (age 39)
- Place of birth: Bassano del Grappa, Italy
- Height: 1.84 m (6 ft 0 in)
- Position: Left back

Team information
- Current team: Campodarsego

Senior career*
Years	Team	Apps	(Gls)
2005–2007	Cittadella	24	(0)
2007–2012	Torino	67	(1)
2010–2011	→ Bologna (loan)	29	(0)
2011–2012	→ Parma (loan)	4	(0)
2012	→ Bologna (loan)	10	(1)
2012–2014	Siena	25	(0)
2013–2014	→ Verona (loan)	0	(0)
2014	→ Chievo (loan)	9	(0)
2014–2016	Modena	74	(1)
2016–2019	Foggia	58	(2)
2019	→ Ascoli (loan)	8	(0)
2019–2021	Reggina	11	(1)
2020–2021	→ Alessandria (loan)	19	(0)
2021–2022	Vis Pesaro	21	(1)
2022–	Campodarsego	2	(0)

International career
2007	Italy U21	3	(0)
- * Club domestic league appearances and goals as of 18 September 2022

Matteo Rubin (born 9 July 1987) is an Italian footballer who plays as a defender for Serie D Group C club Campodarsego.

== Club career ==
=== Early career and Torino ===
Matteo Rubin signed his first professional footballing contract for Serie C1 team Cittadella before signing for Torino in Serie A in a co-ownership for €450,000 fee.

When becoming a first team regular Matteo suffered a ligament injury to his left knee which kept him out of the season for 6 months, sustained while playing for Italy U21 team against Greece.

In June 2008, Torino bought the remaining 50% registration rights of Rubin from Cittadella for an additional €550,000 fee. In August 2010 he was loaned to Bologna, in exchange with Marco Bernacci.

The following August, having returned to Torino, he moved on loan to Parma, who were without a recognised left-back after the departure of Luca Antonelli seven months earlier and Marco Pisano earlier that summer. Midfielders Massimo Gobbi and Francesco Modesto had previously filled in for that position.

On 3 January 2012, Bologna announced that Rubin returned to the club on loan for the remainder of the season. On 11 March, he scored a calamitous own goal against Lazio at the Stadio Olimpico.

=== Siena ===
After returning from his loan spell at Bologna, Torino sold 50% registration rights of Rubin to Siena, as part of the deal of Alessandro Gazzi to Torino from Siena. In June 2013, Siena bought the remaining 50% rights of Rubin from Torino, for a fee of €100,000.

On 2 September 2013 Rubin moved to Verona on a temporary deal. He was assigned number 16 shirt.

On 24 January 2014, Rubin moved to Chievo on a temporary deal, with Manuel Pamić moved to Siena.

=== Modena ===
Siena went bankrupted in summer 2014; Rubin joined Serie B club Modena as a free agent. On 16 September 2015, Rubin signed a new 3-year contract.

=== Foggia ===
On 25 August 2016 Rubin was transferred to Foggia.

==== Loan to Ascoli ====
On 31 January 2019, he was loaned to Ascoli with an option to purchase.

=== Reggina ===
On 4 August 2019, he signed a 2-year contract with Serie C club Reggina.

==== Loan to Alessandria ====
On 3 September 2020, he joined Alessandria on a season-long loan.

=== Vis Pesaro ===
On 1 September 2021, he moved to Vis Pesaro.

=== Serie D ===
On 14 July 2022, Rubin signed with Campodarsego in Serie D.

== Career statistics ==
=== Club ===
As of match played 6 March 2022

Appearances and goals by club, season and competition
Club	Season	League			National Cup		Other		Total	
Club	Season	Division	Apps	Goals	Apps	Goals	Apps	Goals	Apps	Goals
Cittadella	2005–06	Serie C1	6	0	1	0	—		7	0
Cittadella	2006–07	Serie C1	18	0	0	0	—		18	0
Cittadella	Total		24	0	1	0	0	0	25	0
Torino	2007–08	Serie A	6	0	0	0	—		6	0
Torino	2008–09	Serie A	27	0	2	0	—		29	0
Torino	2009–10	Serie B	34	1	0	0	4 (Note: Appearance(s) in Promotion Playoffs)	0	38	1
Torino	Total		67	1	2	0	4	0	73	1
Bologna (loan)	2010–11	Serie A	29	0	1	0	—		30	0
Parma (loan)	2011–12	Serie A	4	0	2	0	—		6	0
Bologna (loan)	2011–12	Serie A	10	1	—		—		10	1
Siena	2012–13	Serie A	25	0	1	0	—		26	0
Verona (loan)	2013–14	Serie A	0	0	1	0	—		1	0
Chievo (loan)	2013–14	Serie A	9	0	—		—		9	0
Modena	2014–15	Serie B	34	0	0	0	1 (Note: Appearance(s) in Relegation Playoffs)	0	35	0
Modena	2015–16	Serie B	40	1	1	0	—		41	1
Modena	2016–17	Lega Pro	0	0	1	0	—		1	0
Modena	Total		74	1	2	0	1	0	77	1
Foggia	2016–17	Lega Pro	36	2	0	0	—		36	2
Foggia	2017–18	Serie B	16	0	2	0	—		18	0
Foggia	2018–19	Serie B	6	0	1	0	—		7	0
Foggia	Total		58	2	3	0	0	0	61	2
Ascoli (loan)	2018–19	Serie B	8	0	—		—		8	0
Reggina	2019–20	Serie C	11	1	2	0	—		13	1
Alessandria (loan)	2020–21	Serie C	19	0	2	0	2	0	23	0
Vis Pesaro	2021–22	Serie C	20	1	—		—		20	1
Career total			358	7	17	0	7	0	382	7
