= Angelo Ogbonna =

Italian footballer (born 1988)

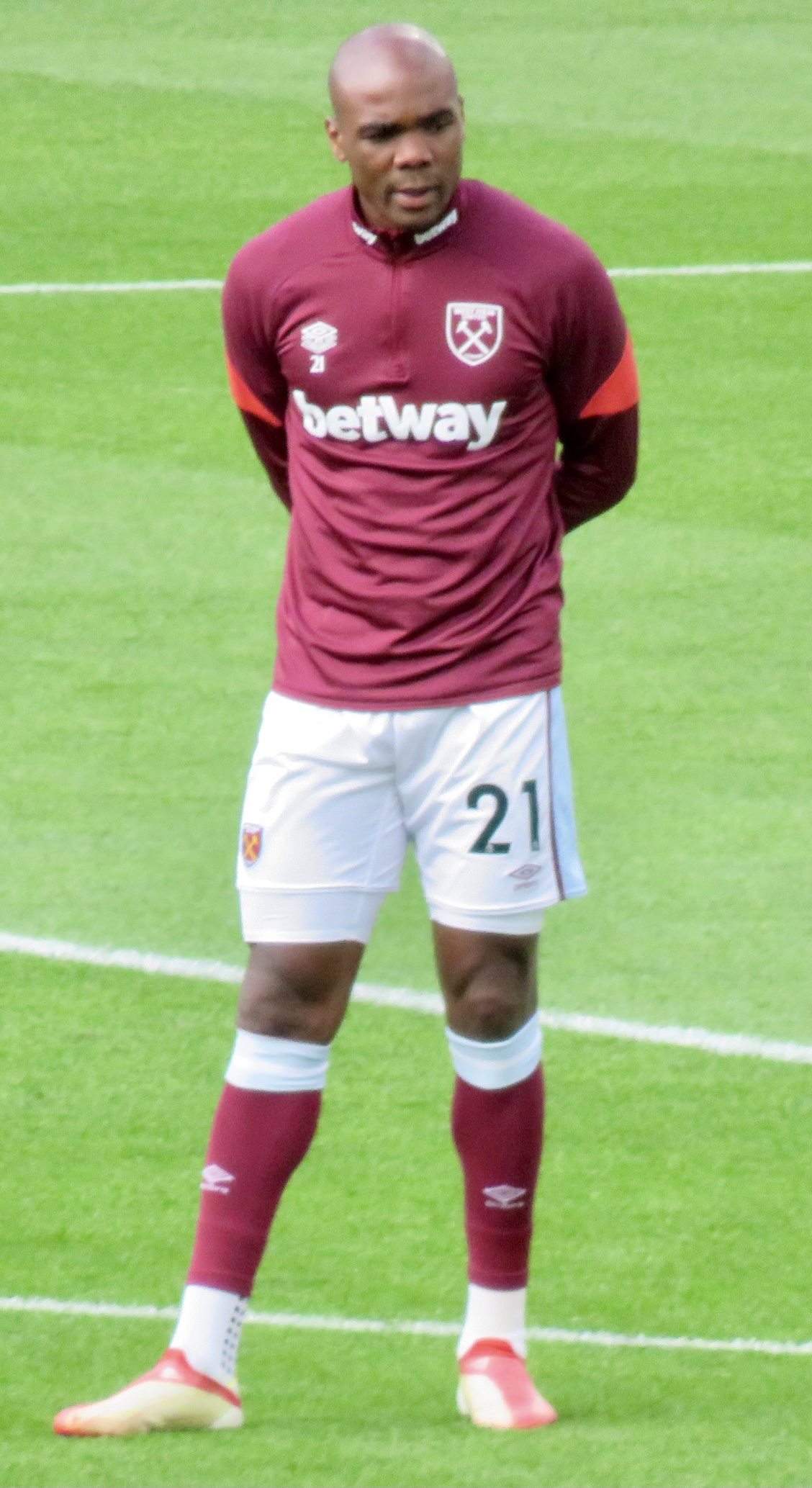
- Ogbonna with West Ham United in 2021

Personal information
- Full name: Obinze Angelo Ogbonna
- Date of birth: 23 May 1988 (age 38)
- Place of birth: Cassino, Italy
- Height: 1.91 m (6 ft 3 in)
- Position: Centre back

Youth career
- Cassino
- 2002–2006: Torino

Senior career*
Years	Team	Apps	(Gls)
2006–2013	Torino	150	(1)
2007–2008	→ Crotone (loan)	22	(0)
2013–2015	Juventus	41	(0)
2015–2024	West Ham United	201	(8)
2024–2025	Watford	6	(0)
Total		420	(9)

International career
2009–2010	Italy U21	10	(0)
2011–2016	Italy	13	(0)
Medal record
Men's Football
Representing Italy
UEFA European Championship
Runner-up	2012
- * Club domestic league appearances and goals as of 18 January 2025 (UTC)

Obinze Angelo Ogbonna (Italian pronunciation: [ˈandʒelo oɡˈbɔnna]; born 23 May 1988) is an Italian former professional footballer who played as a centre-back.

Ogbonna signed for Torino in 2002, having previously been a member of Nuova Cassino's youth set-up. Ogbonna made his debut in Serie A at the age of 18 under Alberto Zaccheroni. After a loan spell at Crotone in Serie C1, he returned to Torino, with whom he played for a further five seasons. In July 2013, he transferred to city rivals, Juventus, where he won the Scudetto in 2013–14 and 2014–15, as well as the 2013 Supercoppa Italiana and the 2014–15 Coppa Italia.

As a member of the Italy national team, he played for the Italian side that finished runners-up at UEFA Euro 2012 and also represented his nation at UEFA Euro 2016.

== Club career ==
=== Torino ===
Ogbonna began his early career in the youth set-up of Cassino, where he played as a central back. In 2002, he was noticed by Torino, which, on the recommendation of Antonio Comi, bought him for €3,000 and assigned him to their youth team. In the 2006–07 season he was regularly called up to the first team and on 11 February 2007 he made his debut in Serie A at age 18, against Reggina (1–2), as a starter under coach Alberto Zaccheroni. At the end of season he totalled 4 league appearances.

The following August he moved on loan to Crotone in Serie C1, making 22 league appearances in the league and nearly earning promotion to Serie B, losing in the semi-final play-offs.

In the 2008–09 Serie A season he returned to Torino, collecting 19 league appearances and four in Coppa Italia. Torino, however, were relegated to Serie B at the end of the season. Starting from 2009, after the relegation of the club to Serie B, he earned his place as a starter for the Granata. On 17 April 2010, Ogbonna scored his first goal for Torino in the match against Cesena, finishing 1–1. On 15 August 2010, in the second round of Coppa Italia against Cosenza (won 3–1 in extra time), he wore the captain's armband for the first time. In three Serie B seasons with Torino, Ogbonna made 105 appearances, helping the club return to Serie A after finishing second to Pescara during the 2011–12 season.

On 2 February 2012, he renewed his contract with Torino until 30 June 2016.

=== Juventus ===
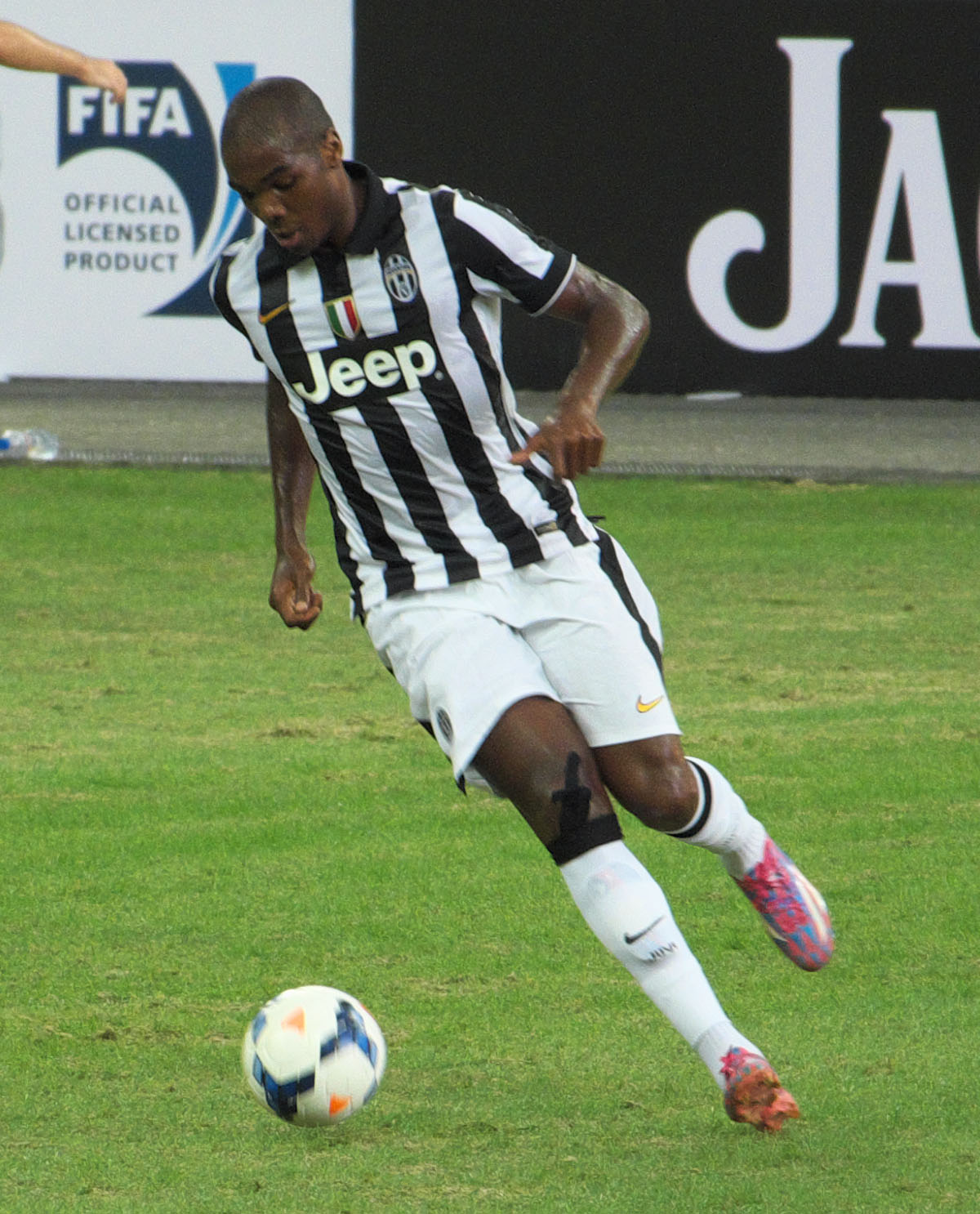
Ogbonna playing for Juventus in 2014

On 11 July 2013, Ogbonna underwent a medical at Turin's Fornaca, Isokinetic and the Istituto di Medicina dello Sport ahead of his proposed cross-town move to Juventus. After passing the medical, he officially signed for Juventus for a transfer fee of €13 million, with an additional €2 million to be paid in future bonuses. He became the first player to become captain of the Granata and transfer to rivals Juventus, sparking much dislike with his old supporters of Torino.

He made his Champions League debut in on 17 September 2013, against F.C. Copenhagen. In his first season, despite being behind Andrea Barzagli, Leonardo Bonucci and Giorgio Chiellini in the pecking order at centre back, Ogbonna managed 25 appearances in all competitions, mostly starting in matches in the latter half of the season as the team was heavily rotated for league, Coppa Italia and Champions League matches. Ogbonna played 16 league games for Juventus in the 2013–14 season, as they won Serie A title. He was also a member of the side which won the 2013 Supercoppa Italiana In the 2014–15 season, Juventus defended the Serie A title once again, with Ogbonna making 25 league appearances, and the 2014–15 Coppa Italia. On 6 June 2015, he was an unused substitute as Juventus lost the Champions League Final 3–1 to Barcelona in Berlin.

=== West Ham United ===
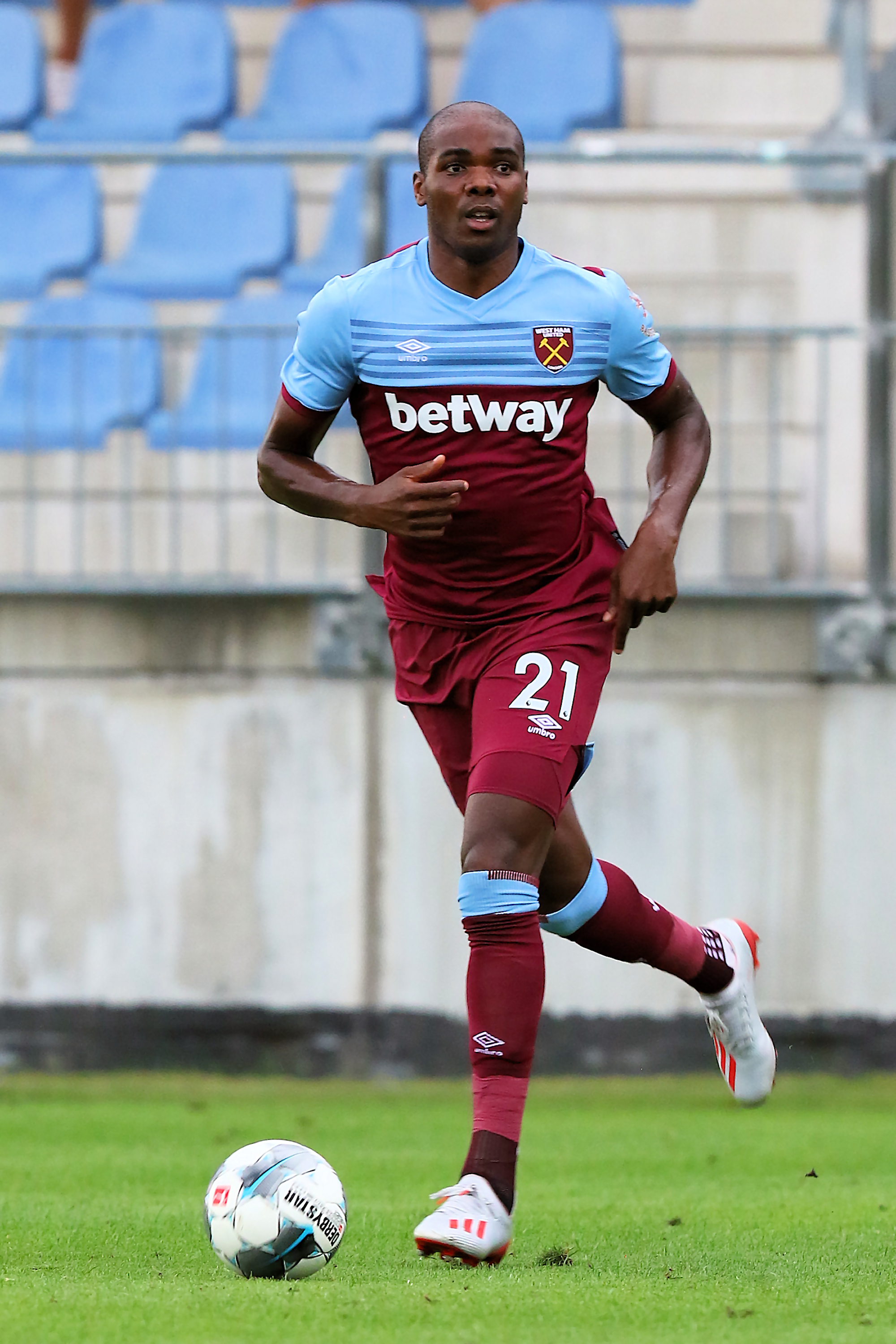
Ogbonna playing for West Ham United in 2019

On 10 July 2015, Ogbonna joined Premier League club West Ham United, on a four-year contract, for €11 million to be spread over the next three financial years. He made his debut 20 days later in the Europa League third qualifying round, starting against Astra Giurgiu; in the 82nd minute he netted an own goal equaliser as West Ham drew 2–2 at the Boleyn Ground. On 9 February 2016, Ogbonna scored his first goal for the club, netting an injury-time match-winning header in the 121st minute of a 2–1 home win over Liverpool, in the fourth round FA Cup replay. Having played 18 of a possible 22 Premier League games for West Ham in the 2016–17 season, he was ruled out for the remainder of the season as he required an operation. West Ham manager, Slaven Bilić, said that Ogbonna had played every game of the season despite carrying the injury. He returned for the final game of the 2016–17 season, a 2–1 away win against Burnley. In June 2017, Ogbonna signed a new contract with West Ham committing him to the club until 2022.

On 11 December 2020, Ogbonna scored the winning goal in a 2–1 away win over Leeds United which secured West Ham's first win at Elland Road since 2000. In November 2021, Ogbonna damaged his anterior cruciate ligament in a home win against Liverpool. The injury ruled him out for the rest of the 2021–22 season. Ogbonna made his return on 18 August 2022 in the 2022–23 Europa Conference League in a 3–1 home win against Danish team Viborg.

In June 2024, West Ham announced that Ogbonna, alongside teammateJoseph Anang, would be leaving the club at the end of the 2023–24 season; he made 249 appearances for the Hammers, scoring 13 goals. Having played 201 Premier League games, he was the second Italian footballer with the highest number of appearances in the league at the time of his departure, behind only Gianfranco Zola.

=== Watford ===
On 27 August 2024, Ogbonna signed for EFL Championship club Watford as a free agent, on an initial season-long contract.

In May 2025, it was announced that he would be released by Watford at the end of the 2024–25 season, having played inconsistently during his time with the club.

== International career ==
On 12 August 2009, he made his debut with the Italian under-21 team in a friendly game against Russia.

Ogbonna made his senior debut on 11 November 2011 in a 2–0 friendly victory against Poland, where he came on as a substitute for Domenico Criscito in the 77th minute.

Ogbonna was included by manager Cesare Prandelli in the Italian 23-man final squad for Euro 2012, but did not play during the competition.

In May 2016, Ogbonna was included in the provisional 30-man Italy squad for Euro 2016; On 31 May 2016, he was named in Antonio Conte's final 23-man squad for the tournament. Ogbonna made his only appearance of the tournament on 22 June, in Italy's final group match, which ended in a 1–0 defeat to Ireland. In October 2020, after a two-year absence, Ogbonna was called into the Italian squad by manager, Roberto Mancini, for two games in the Nations League.

== Style of play ==
As a central defender, Ogbonna is primarily known for his physical attributes; he is also a competent tackler, and possesses a good positional sense, as well as an ability to read the game. He is also capable of playing as a left back on occasion, due to his pace, technique, ball skills, vision, and distribution with his left foot.

== Personal life ==
Ogbonna was born to Nigerian parents who emigrated to Italy from Nigeria in 1983, settling in the city of Cassino in the central part of the country, but managed to obtain Italian citizenship only after his 18th birthday.

On 22 December 2008, Ogbonna survived a car accident near Turin after he lost control of his Smart car and drove off a bridge into a torrent at around 5:00 AM.

== Career statistics ==
=== Club ===
As of match played 18 January 2025

Appearances and goals by club, season and competition
Club	Season	League			National cup (Note: Includes Coppa Italia and FA Cup)		League cup (Note: Includes EFL Cup)		Europe		Other		Total	
Club	Season	Division	Apps	Goals	Apps	Goals	Apps	Goals	Apps	Goals	Apps	Goals	Apps	Goals
Torino	2006–07	Serie A	4	0	0	0	—		—		—		4	0
Torino	2008–09	Serie A	19	0	4	0	—		—		—		23	0
Torino	2009–10	Serie B	31	1	1	0	—		—		3 (Note: Appearance(s) in Serie B promotion play-offs)	0	35	1
Torino	2010–11	Serie B	35	0	2	0	—		—		—		37	0
Torino	2011–12	Serie B	39	0	2	0	—		—		—		41	0
Torino	2012–13	Serie A	22	0	1	0	—		—		—		23	0
Torino	Total		150	1	10	0	—		—		3	0	163	1
Crotone (loan)	2007–08	Serie C1	22	0	1	0	—		—		2 (Note: Appearance(s) in Serie C1 promotion play-offs)	0	25	0
Juventus	2013–14	Serie A	16	0	2	0	—		6 (Note: Three appearances in UEFA Champions League, three appearances in UEFA Europa League)	0	1 (Note: Appearance in Supercoppa Italiana)	0	25	0
Juventus	2014–15	Serie A	25	0	4	0	—		1 (Note: Appearance(s) in UEFA Champions League)	0	0	0	30	0
Juventus	Total		41	0	6	0	—		7	0	1	0	55	0
West Ham United	2015–16	Premier League	28	0	5	1	0	0	1 (Note: Appearance(s) in UEFA Europa League)	0	—		34	1
West Ham United	2016–17	Premier League	20	0	1	0	3	0	2	0	—		26	0
West Ham United	2017–18	Premier League	32	1	3	0	4	2	—		—		39	3
West Ham United	2018–19	Premier League	24	1	2	0	3	2	—		—		29	3
West Ham United	2019–20	Premier League	31	2	2	0	0	0	—		—		33	2
West Ham United	2020–21	Premier League	28	3	2	0	0	0	—		—		30	3
West Ham United	2021–22	Premier League	11	1	0	0	0	0	0	0	—		11	1
West Ham United	2022–23	Premier League	16	0	3	0	1	0	10 (Note: Appearances in UEFA Europa Conference League)	0	—		30	0
West Ham United	2023–24	Premier League	11	0	1	0	2	0	3	0	—		17	0
West Ham United	Total		201	8	19	1	13	4	16	0	—		249	13
Watford	2024–25	Championship	6	0	1	0	1	0	—		—		8	0
Career total			420	9	36	1	14	4	23	0	6	0	500	14

=== International ===
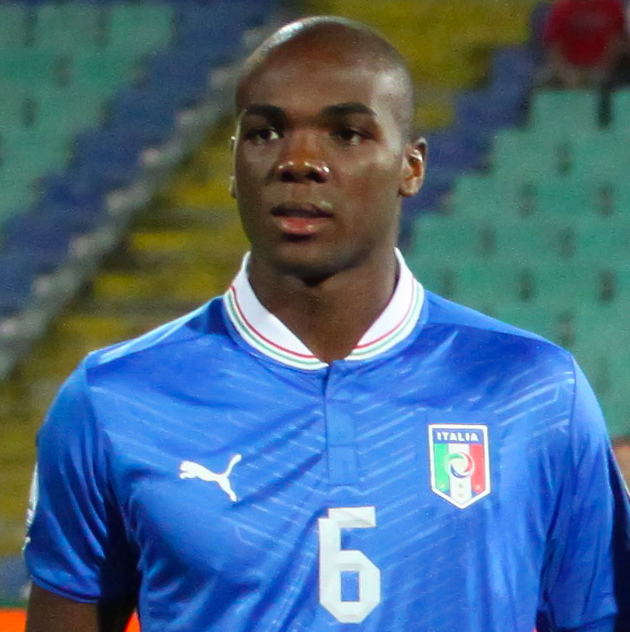
Ogbonna with Italy in 2012

As of match played 5 September 2016

Appearances and goals by national team and year
National team	Year	Apps	Goals
Italy	2011	1	0
Italy	2012	4	0
Italy	2013	4	0
Italy	2014	1	0
Italy	2016	3	0
Total		13	0

== Honours ==
Torino

- Serie B promotion: 2011–12

Juventus

- Serie A: 2013–14, 2014–15
- Coppa Italia: 2014–15
- Supercoppa Italiana: 2013

West Ham United

- UEFA Europa Conference League: 2022–23

Italy

- UEFA European Championship runner-up: 2012
