= Rolando Bianchi =

Italian footballer (born 1983)

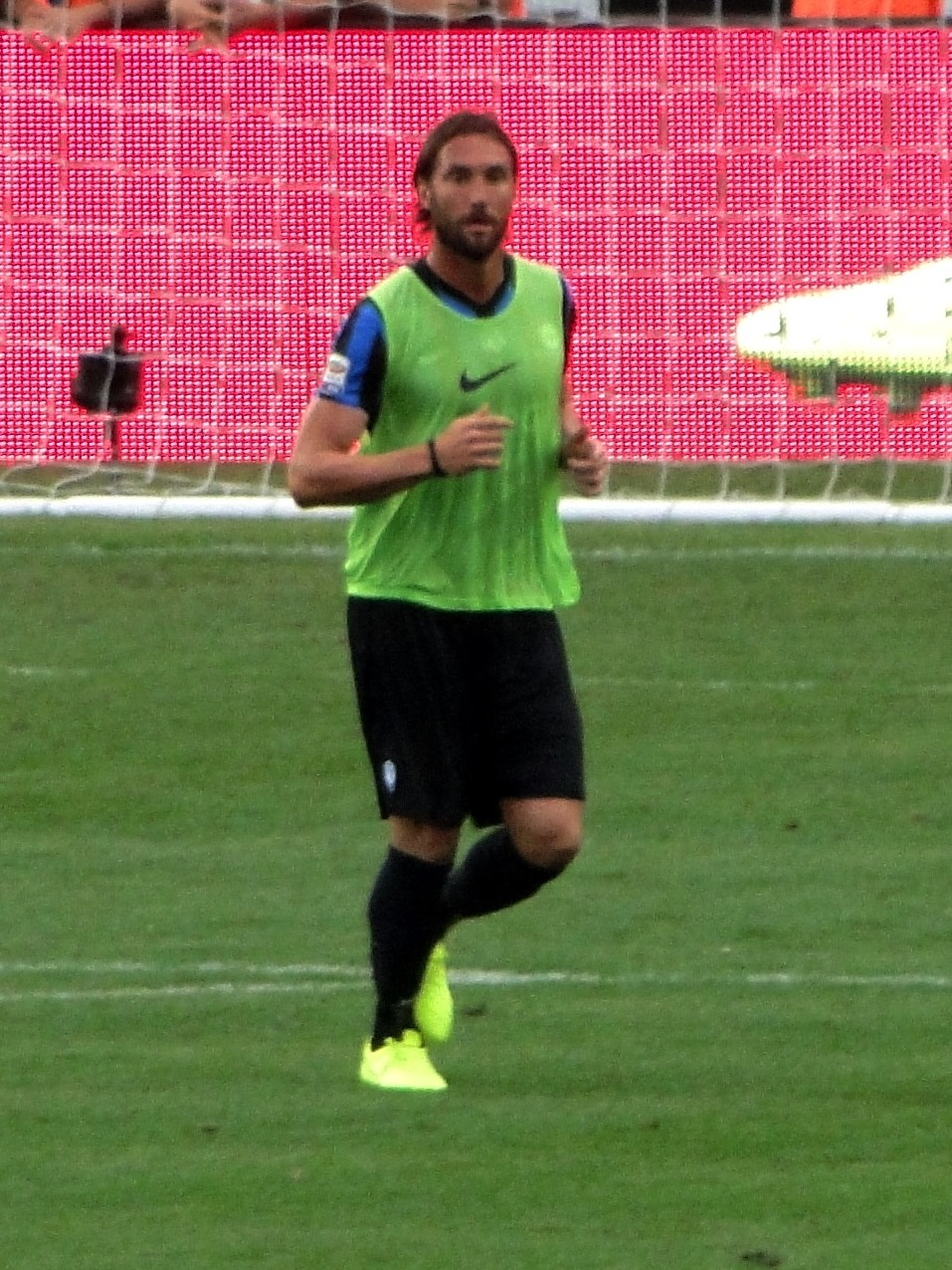
- Bianchi with Atalanta

Personal information
- Date of birth: 15 February 1983 (age 43)
- Place of birth: Lovere, Italy
- Height: 1.88 m (6 ft 2 in)
- Position: Forward

Youth career
- 1993–2002: Atalanta

Senior career*
Years	Team	Apps	(Gls)
2000–2004	Atalanta	21	(0)
2004–2005	Cagliari	39	(4)
2005–2007	Reggina	46	(19)
2007–2008	Manchester City	19	(4)
2008	→ Lazio (loan)	15	(4)
2008–2013	Torino	169	(71)
2013–2015	Bologna	28	(3)
2014–2015	→ Atalanta (loan)	21	(0)
2015–2016	Mallorca	16	(2)
2016–2017	Perugia	7	(1)
2017	Pro Vercelli	11	(3)
Total		392	(111)

International career
2000–2001	Italy U17	3	(0)
2004	Italy U20	3	(1)
2002–2006	Italy U21	13	(8)
- * Club domestic league appearances and goals

Rolando Bianchi (Italian pronunciation: [roˈlando ˈbjaŋki]; born 15 February 1983) is an Italian former professional footballer who played as a forward.

With 77 total goals, he is Torino's 11th-highest all-time goal scorer. Bianchi was primarily known for his ability in the air.

== Club career ==
=== Atalanta ===
A product of the Atalanta youth system, Bianchi made his Serie A debut at the age of 18 during the 2000–01 season. He played the final 10 minutes in a 2–1 loss to Juventus on 17 June 2001. His only appearance during the season. The following season he made an additional three appearances for the bergamaschi, while during the 2002–03 season he made 16 appearances. Despite being a prolific scorer in the youth ranks, he played 21 games for the first team without scoring any goals.

=== Cagliari ===
He was sold in co-ownership to Serie B team Cagliari in January 2004, where he played 14 matches and scored two goals helping them gain promotion to Serie A. The 2004–05 season, for which he remained at Cagliari, saw him score 2 goals in 25 matches.

=== Reggina ===
Bianchi was promptly sold to Reggina in 2005, where his first season was hampered by a serious knee injury suffered early on in the season. He recovered to play nine games late in the season, scoring one goal.

The 2006–07 season saw him score 18 goals in 37 games. Due to their indictment for sporting fraud, the club had started the season with an 11-point deduction and seemed destined for relegation. They managed to save themselves, however, with Bianchi's performances considered a key part of Reggina's Serie A survival. He finished the season 4th in the league's goal scoring table.

=== Manchester City ===
His form for Reggina attracted the attention of clubs throughout Europe, and in July 2007 Bianchi moved to Manchester City for a reported fee of £8.8 million (€13 million), where he was given the number 10 shirt. Bianchi scored on his debut for the Cityzens against West Ham United, slotting home from close range following a run and pass from Elano. His second goal came in a 2–1 victory in the Football League Cup 2nd round against Bristol City. Bianchi then scored his third goal in English football in a 2–1 defeat against Tottenham Hotspur on 9 December 2007. Then on the following Saturday, he scored the first goal against Bolton Wanderers in a 4–2 victory. Later that month, Bianchi criticised English cuisine and alcohol culture, and stated how he could never become a full international unless he returned to Serie A.

==== Loan to Lazio ====
In January 2008, Manchester City manager Sven-Göran Eriksson informed him that he would be allowed to leave the club. On 23 January 2008, Bianchi finalised a loan move to Lazio after not being able to settle in England. In his debut with Lazio on 27 January, he was sent off after picking up two yellow cards in just under five minutes, as the capital club drew 0–0 with Torino. Bianchi scored his first goal for Lazio against former club Reggina from a penalty kick in a 1–0 victory. In spite of his hope that Lazio would make his move permanent, he had in fact been asked to return to Manchester City.

=== Torino ===
On 23 August 2008, after a summer of much speculation about a possible move, it was officially announced by Manchester City that Bianchi had signed for Italian club Torino on a five-year deal, for a fee of €5 million.

On 18 August 2012, he scored two goals in Torino's 4–2 defeat of Lecce in the Third Round of the Coppa Italia, Torino's first competitive game of the new season. Bianchi scored two goals in a 5–1 defeat of Atalanta on 30 September, reaching 70 goals with Torino. With these strikes, he entered into the Top 10 scorers for the club, tied with club legend, Ezio Loik. Bianchi helped the club to a 3–2 victory over Siena on 13 January 2013, heading in a cross from Valter Birsa in the later stages of the first-half.

=== Bologna and Atalanta ===
On 9 July 2013, he was signed by Bologna. Bologna were relegated at the end of season. Bianchi wore the no.9 shirt that season.

On 5 August 2014, he returned to Atalanta in a temporary deal, with Rubén Bentancourt moving in the opposite direction. On the same day Bologna signed Daniele Cacia.

On 8 August 2015, Bianchi was released by Bologna.

=== Mallorca and Perugia ===
On 27 August 2015, he joined RCD Mallorca. After contributing with only two goals in 16 matches, Bianchi rescinded his contract and moved to Perugia.

He signed a 1 1/2-year contract with Perugia on 20 January 2016.

=== Pro Vercelli ===
On 19 February 2017, Bianchi signed for Pro Vercelli.

== International career ==
In the summer of 2006, Bianchi was called up to the Italy U-21 squad for the 2006 U-21 Championships in Portugal, where he appeared three times and scored one goal.
