= List of Italian football transfers summer 2006 (August) =

This is a list of Italian football transfers from the summer of 2006.

Legend

- Italic text indicates that the player had already left the team on loan this season, or was a new signing who immediately left the club.

== Summer transfer window ==
=== August ===
Date	Name	Nationality	Moving from	Moving to	Fee
2 August 2006	Gianvito Plasmati		Catania	Crotone	Loan
2 August 2006	Domenico Di Cecco		Chieti	Chievo	Free
	Domenico Di Cecco		Chievo	Avellino	Loan
2 August 2006	Patrick Vieira		Juventus	Internazionale	€9.5M
2 August 2006	Daniele Corvia		Roma	Siena	Co-ownership, €200,000
2 August 2006	Marco Pecorari		Lecce	Ascoli	Loan
3 August 2006	Enrico Fantini		Fiorentina	Bologna	€0.5M
3 August 2006	Fausto Rossini		Udinese	Catania	Undisclosed
4 August 2006	Douglas Packer		Juventus	Siena	Loan
4 August 2006	Leonardo Gatto		Juventus	Reggina	Loan
4 August 2006	Roberto Romeo		Juventus	Reggina	Undisclosed
4 August 2006	Mathieu Moreau		Internazionale	Lucchese	Co-ownership, undisclosed
5 August 2006	Giuseppe Colucci		Verona	Catania	Co-ownership, undisclosed
5 August 2006	Michele Tarallo		Genoa	Padova	Undisclosed
5 August 2006	Paolo Facchinetti		Genoa	Padova	Undisclosed
5 August 2006	Simone Barone		Palermo	Torino	€4M
7 August 2006	Hernán Crespo		Chelsea	Internazionale	Loan
8 August 2006	Emanuele Belardi		Reggina	Juventus	Loan
8 August 2006	Stephen Makinwa	(Nigeria)	Palermo	Lazio	Co-ownership, €3.3M
9 August 2006	Lorenzo Stovini		Lecce	Catania	Undisclosed
9 August 2006	Fernando Tissone		Udinese	Atalanta	Co-ownership, €1.5M (player swap)
9 August 2006	Michele Rinaldi		Atalanta	Udinese	Co-ownership, €0.8M (player swap)
9 August 2006	Christian Tiboni		Atalanta	Udinese	Co-ownership, €1.1M (player swap)
9 August 2006	Andrea Bovo	Italy	Palermo	Bari	Loan
9 August 2006	Andrea Dossena	Italy	Treviso	Udinese	Co-ownership, undisclosed
9 August 2006	Rubén Olivera	Uruguay	Juventus	Sampdoria	Loan
9 August 2006	Alessandro Moro	Italy	Udinese	Treviso	Co-ownership, undisclosed
9 August 2006	Federico Melchiorri	Italy	Tolentino	Siena	Undisclosed
9 August 2006	Simone Vitale	Italy	Pescara	Pro Vasto	Loan
10 August 2006	Zlatan Ibrahimović	Sweden	Juventus	Internazionale	€24.8M
10 August 2006	Guilherme Siqueira	Brazil	Internazionale	Udinese	Co-ownership, undisclosed
13 August 2006	Marco Pomante	Italy	Pescara	Giulianova	Loan
16 August 2006	Thomas Job	Cameroon	Sampdoria	Ascoli	Co-ownership, €500
16 August 2006	Daniele Galloppa	Italy	Roma	Ascoli	Loan
17 August 2006	Gianluca Comotto		Roma	Torino	Loan, €250,000
18 August 2006	Ilyos Zeytulayev	Uzbekistan	Reggina	Genoa	Loan
18 August 2006	Samuele Dalla Bona	Italy	Milan	Napoli	Free
19 August 2006	David Pizarro	Chile	Internazionale	Roma	Co-ownership, €6.5M
21 August 2006	Marco Delvecchio	Italy	Parma	Ascoli	Free
21 August 2006	Dimitrios Eleftheropoulos	Greece	Roma	Ascoli	Free
21 August 2006	Luca Lacrimini	Italy	Napoli	Frosinone	Loan
21 August 2006	Vittorio Gargiulo	Italy	Frosinone	Teramo	Co-ownership, undisclosed
21 August 2006	Massimo Paci	Italy	Genoa	Parma	Undisclosed
21 August 2006	José Mamede	Portugal	Genoa	Perugia	Loan
22 August 2006	Jean-Alain Boumsong	France	(England) Newcastle United	Juventus	€4.8M
22 August 2006	Giovanni Bartolucci	Italy	Juventus	Siena	Co-ownership, undisclosed
22 August 2006	Andrea Masiello	Italy	Juventus	Siena	Co-ownership, €1.25M
22 August 2006	Eros Bagnara	Italy	Treviso	Novara	Loan
23 August 2006	Marco Gallozzi	Italy	Alatri	Ascoli	Undisclosed
23 August 2006	Matías Lequi	Argentina	Lazio	(Spain) Celta de Vigo	€750K
23 August 2006	Kewullay Conteh	Italy	Palermo	Atalanta	Loan
24 August 2006	Giuseppe Sculli	Italy	Juventus	Genoa	Loan
24 August 2006	Matteo Scapini	Italy	Vicenza	Portogruaro	Co-ownership, undisclosed
24 August 2006	Juan Manuel Vargas	Peru	(Argentina) Colón	Catania	Undisclosed
24 August 2006	Orazio Russo	Italy	Catania	Padova	Undisclosed
25 August 2006	Daniel Ciofani	Italy	Pescara	Celano	Loan
25 August 2006	Alessio Spoltore	Italy	Pescara	Celano	Loan
25 August 2006	Obafemi Martins	Nigeria	Internazionale	(England) Newcastle United	€15M
25 August 2006	Vitangelo Spadavecchia	Italy	Bari	Pescara	Loan
25 August 2006	Vincenzo Aridità	Italy	Pescara	Pro Vasto	Loan
25 August 2006	Nelson Abeijón	Uruguay	Cagliari	Atalanta	Free
25 August 2006	Matteo Bonatti	Italy	Empoli	Massese	Loan
26 August 2006	Paolo Bianco	Italy	Catania	Cagliari	Loan
26 August 2006	Andrea Rossi	Italy	Juventus	Siena	Loan
26 August 2006	Luca Tomasig	Italy	Cagliari	Catanzaro	Free
27 August 2006	Vito Di Bari	Italy	Frosinone	San Marino	Loan
27 August 2006	Giuseppe Abruzzese	Italy	Lecce	Triestina	Loan
27 August 2006	Juan Landaida	Argentina	Triestina	Sambenedettese	Loan
28 August 2006	Gianluca Falsini	Italy	Siena	Catania	Undisclosed
28 August 2006	Olivier Kapo	France	Juventus	(Spain) Levante	Loan
28 August 2006	Alfredo Cariello	Italy	Chievo	Crotone	Co-ownership, undisclosed
28 August 2006	Gianluca Falsini	Italy	Siena	Catania	Undisclosed
28 August 2006	Rocco Sabato	Italy	Catania	Cesena	Co-ownership, undisclosed
29 August 2006	Luca Cavallaro	Italy	Juventus	Parma	Loan
29 August 2006	Angelo Iorio	Italy	Cremonese	Piacenza	Co-ownership, undisclosed
29 August 2006	Cristiano Doni	Italy	(Spain) Mallorca	Atalanta	Undisclosed
29 August 2006	Federico Nieto	Argentina	Genoa	Verona	Loan
29 August 2006	Rodrigue Boisfer	France	Genoa	Sangiovannese	Loan
29 August 2006	Michele Bacis	Italy	Genoa	Avellino	Loan
29 August 2006	Stefano De Angelis	Italy	Genoa	Avellino	Loan
29 August 2006	Rivaldo González	Paraguay	Genoa	Avellino	Loan
29 August 2006	Corrado Colombo	Italy	Sampdoria	Brescia	Co-ownership, €500
30 August 2006	Alessandro Rapino	Italy	Pescara (youth)	Pro Vasto	Loan
30 August 2006	Christian Vieri	Italy	Monaco	Atalanta	Free
30 August 2006	Rodrigo Defendi	Brazil	(England) Tottenham Hotspur	Roma	Loan
30 August 2006	Mirko Vučinić	Montenegro	Lecce	Roma	Loan, €3.25M
30 August 2006	Leandro Cufré	Argentina	Roma	Monaco	€2.1M
30 August 2006	Matteo Lunati	Italy	SPAL	Milan	Undisclosed
30 August 2006	Stefano Di Berardino	Italy	Pescara (youth)	Juventus (youth)	Undisclosed
30 August 2006	Andrea Luci	Italy	Juventus	Pescara	Loan
30 August 2006	Emilio Docente	Italy	Rimini	Ancona	Loan
30 August 2006	Alessandro Tulli	Italy	Roma	Lecce	Co-ownership, €0.25M
31 August 2006	Tiago Pires	Portugal	(Portugal) Sporting	Genoa	Free
31 August 2006	Rej Volpato	Italy	Juventus	Arezzo	Loan
31 August 2006	Claudio Scarzanella	Italy	Juventus	Crotone	Loan
31 August 2006	Pasquale Izzo	Italy	Juventus	Napoli	Loan
31 August 2006	György Garics	Austria	(Austria) Rapid Vienna	Napoli	€500K
31 August 2006	Umberto Varriale	Italy	Mariano Keller (youth)	Napoli (youth)	Undisclosed
31 August 2006	Mariano González	Argentina	Palermo	Internazionale	Loan
31 August 2006	Gilberto Martínez	Costa Rica	Brescia	Roma	Loan
31 August 2006	Adriano Zancopè	Italy	Treviso	Vicenza	Undisclosed
31 August 2006	Dalibor Višković	Croatia	(Israel) Hapoel Petah Tikva	Vicenza	Free
31 August 2006	Andrea Fabbrini	Italy	Vicenza	Cuneo	Undisclosed
31 August 2006	Alberto Baggio	Italy	Vicenza	Imperia	Undisclosed
31 August 2006	Massimo Gotti	Italy	Udinese	Ascoli	Loan
31 August 2006	Marco Paoloni	Italy	Teramo	Ascoli	Co-ownership, undisclosed
31 August 2006	Marco Paoloni	Italy	Ascoli	Teramo	Loan
31 August 2006	Andrea Ciotti	Italy	Ascoli	Rende	Undisclosed
31 August 2006	Edgars Gauračs	Latvia	(Latvia) Dižvanagi	Ascoli	Undisclosed
31 August 2006	César	Brazil	Internazionale	(Brazil) Corinthians Paulista	Loan
31 August 2006	Tobia Fusciello	Italy	Atalanta	Udinese	Loan
31 August 2006	Gianmarco Gurian	Italy	Atalanta	Udinese	Loan
31 August 2006	Juan Surraco	Uruguay	(Uruguay) Central Español	Udinese	Undisclosed
31 August 2006	Pasquale Foggia	Italy	Milan	Lazio	Loan
31 August 2006	Matteo Merini	Italy	Bari	Lazio	Loan
31 August 2006	Enrico Geroni	Italy	Prato	AlbinoLeffe	Loan
31 August 2006	Alex Cordaz	Italy	Internazionale	Treviso	Co-ownership, undisclosed
31 August 2006	Alex Cordaz	Italy	Treviso	Pizzighettone	Loan
31 August 2006	Johann Vogel	Switzerland	Milan	(Spain) Real Betis	Free
31 August 2006	Ricardo Oliveira	Brazil	(Spain) Real Betis	Milan	€17.65M
31 August 2006	Daniel Semenzato	Italy	Internazionale	Montichiari	Co-ownership, undisclosed
31 August 2006	Mohamadou Sissoko	France	(France) Paris FC	Udinese	Undisclosed
31 August 2006	Davide Biondini	Italy	Reggina	Cagliari	Loan
31 August 2006	Andrea Cossu	Italy	Cagliari	Verona	Undisclosed
31 August 2006	Ivan Pedrelli	Italy	Venezia	Verona	Loan
31 August 2006	Zé María	Brazil	Internazionale	(Spain) Levante	Free
31 August 2006	Leonardo José Talamonti	Argentina	(Argentina) River Plate	Atalanta	Loan
31 August 2006	Fabio Lauria	Italy	Arezzo	Martina	Loan
31 August 2006	Walter García	Argentina	(Russia) Rubin Kazan	Catania	Loan
31 August 2006	Matteo Gritti	Italy	Catania	Andria	Loan
31 August 2006	Amauri	Brazil	Chievo	Palermo	€7.7M
31 August 2006	Denis Godeas	Italy	Palermo	Chievo	€0.7M
31 August 2006	Leandro Rinaudo	Italy	Palermo	Siena	Loan
31 August 2006	Andrea Mengoni	Italy	Chievo (on loan at Frosinone)	Grosseto	Loan
31 August 2006	Lucas Rimoldi	Argentina	Genoa	Frosinone	Loan
31 August 2006	Gianluca Galasso	Argentina	Roma	Frosinone	Loan
31 August 2006	Juriy Cannarsa	Italy	Reggina	Frosinone	Undisclosed
31 August 2006	Davide Carcuro	Italy	Treviso (youth)	Fiorentina (youth)	Loan
31 August 2006	Gleison Santos	Brazil	Monza	AlbinoLeffe	Co-ownership, undisclosed
31 August 2006	Alberto Galuppo	Italy	Parma	Grosseto	Loan
31 August 2006	Luca Tognozzi	Italy	Pescara	Reggina	Undisclosed
31 August 2006	Andrei Agius	Malta	Messina	Martina	Loan
31 August 2006	Davide Arigò	Italy	Messina	Martina	Loan

=== September ===
Date	Name	Nationality	Moving from	Moving to	Fee
1 September 2006	Márcio Amoroso	Brazil	Milan	(Brazil) Corinthians	Free
8 September 2006	Davide Favaro	Italy	Parma	Pro Sesto	Loan
13 September 2006	Nicola Silvestri	Italy	Genoa	Massese	Loan
13 September 2006	Massimo Gazzoli	Italy	Genoa	Massese	Undisclosed

=== Unknown date ===
Date	Name	Nat	Moving from	Moving to	Fee
	Juanito Gómez Taleb	Argentina	Triestina	Bellaria	Loan
	Fabio Pisacane	Italy	Genoa	Cremonese	Loan
	Umberto Improta	Italy	Triestina	Salernitana	Loan
	Ivan Artipoli	Italy	Sampdoria	Prato	Loan
	Antonio Tedesco	Italy	Catania	Brindisi	Loan
	Alessandro Volpe	Italy	Empoli	Olbia	Loan
	Alessio Sestu	Italy	Treviso	Salernitana	Loan
	Rocco D'Aiello	Italy	Palermo	Gela	Co-ownership, €500
	Antonino Di Franco	Italy	Palermo	Gela	Co-ownership, €500
	Alessandro Gambadori	Italy	Livorno	Sassuolo	Loan
	Sebastiano Girelli	Italy	Modena	Sassuolo	Loan
	William Jidayi	Italy	Modena	Sassuolo	Loan
	Jacopo Ravasi	Italy	Internazionale (youth)	Pergocrema	Undisclosed
	Mario Artistico	Italy	Udinese	Cisco Roma	Loan
	Francesco Zizzari	Italy	Spezia	Grosseto	Loan
	Angelo Pagotto	Italy	Torino	Grosseto	Undisclosed
	Shadi Ghosheh	Italy	Messina (youth)	Cisco Roma (youth)	Loan
	Renato Dossena	Italy	Empoli	Rovigo	Loan
	Daniel Bombardieri	Italy	AlbinoLeffe	Pergocrema	Loan
	Giovanni Bruno	Italy	Frosinone	Cisco Roma	Undisclosed
	Leonardo Blanchard	Italy	Siena (youth)	Poggibonsi	Loan
	Matteo Lombardo	Italy	Internazionale	Pistoiese	Loan
	Marco Dalla Costa	Italy	Internazionale	Pro Sesto	Loan
	Nicola Redomi	Italy	Internazionale	Pro Sesto	Loan
	Daniele Federici	Italy	Internazionale	Pro Sesto	Loan
	Luca Palazzo	Italy	Internazionale	Pro Sesto	Co-ownership, €1,000
	Antonio Gaeta	Italy	Ascoli	Pro Vasto	Loan
	Giovanni Taormina	Italy	Sampdoria	Alessandria	Loan
	Ivan Pedrelli	Italy	Bologna	Venezia	Co-ownership, undisclosed
	Lorenzo Burzigotti	Italy	Arezzo	Sansovino	Loan
	Fabio Zaccardi	Italy	Lazio	Paganese	Undisclosed
	Paolo Di Canio	Italy	Lazio	Cisco Roma	Free
	Christian Keller	Denmark	Lazio	(Norway) Stabæk	Undisclosed
	Andrea Briotti	Italy	Roma	Sassuolo	Co-ownership, €500
	Fabrizio Miccoli	Italy	Juventus	(Portugal) Benfica	Loan, €250K
	Davide Chiumiento	Switzerland	Juventus	(Switzerland) Young Boys	Loan
	Ervin Skela	Albania	(Germany) Kaiserslautern	Ascoli	Free
	Pierre Wome	Cameroon	Internazionale	(Germany) Werder Bremen	Free
	Kily González	Argentina	Internazionale	(Argentina) Rosario Central	Free
	Ronny Toma	Italy	Internazionale	Pergocrema	Loan
	Salvatore Ferraro	Italy	Internazionale	San Marino Calcio	Loan
	Giuseppe Ticli	Italy	Milan	Pro Patria	Loan
	Marco Varaldi	Italy	Milan	Lecco	Loan
	Leonardo Pettinari	Italy	Fiorentina	Sangiovannese	Co-ownership, undisclosed
	Stefano Del Sante	Italy	Fiorentina	Pizzighettone	Loan
	Tommaso Bellazzini	Italy	Fiorentina	Pistoiese	Co-ownership, undisclosed
	Pietro Tripoli	Italy	Palermo	Sambenedettese	Loan
	Claiton dos Santos	Brazil	Milan	Varese	Co-ownership, undisclosed
	Domenico Germinale	Italy	Internazionale	Pizzighettone	Loan
	Andrea Stucchi	Italy	Atalanta	Varese	Loan
	Paolo Comi	Italy	Roma	Tritium	Free
	Mauro Rizzo	Italy	Lecce	Andria	Co-ownership, undisclsoed
	Leonardo Moracci	Italy	Chievo	Pro Belvedere Vercelli	Loan
	Nicola Lai	Italy	Cagliari	Rieti	Co-ownership, undisclosed
	Martino Olivetti	Italy	Chievo	Prato	Loan
	Mauro Belotti	Italy	AlbinoLeffe	Pergocrema	Loan
	Alex Pederzoli	Italy	Juventus	Pistoiese	Loan
	Cristian Agnelli	Italy	Lecce	Salernitana	Loan
	Tommaso Romito	Italy	Napoli	Salernitana	Loan
	Christian Conti	Italy	Bari	Lanciano	Loan
	Michele Franco	Italy	Bari	Cremonese	Loan
	Franco Da Dalt	Argentina	Triestina	Foggia	Loan
	Matías Claudio Cuffa	Argentina	Chievo	Catanzaro	Loan
	Giuseppe Giglio	Italy	Napoli	Gallipoli	Loan

== Bibliography ==
- "Official Summer Transfer List" (PDF). Lega Calcio (in Italian). 1 September 2006. Archived from the original (PDF) on 5 October 2006.
