= List of Italian football transfers summer 2006 (co-ownership) =

== Co-ownership ==
Date	Name	Co-own Club	Mother Club	Result	Fee	
20 June 2006	Robert Acquafresca	Treviso	Internazionale	Renewed	—	
22 June 2006	Sergio Bernardo Almirón (Argentina)	Empoli	Udinese	Empoli	Auction, Undisclosed	
20 June 2006	Fabio Alterio	Giugliano	Verona	ND (Giugliano)	Free	
	Marco Angeletti	Sambenedettese	Lazio	ND	Free	
22 June 2006	Angelo Antonazzo	Grosseto	Ascoli	Grosseto	Auction, Undisclosed	
20 June 2006	Luca Antonini	Sampdoria	Milan	Renewed	—	
22 June 2006	Antonio Aquilanti	Fiorentina	Pescara	Pescara	Auction, €500	
20 June 2006	Salvatore Aronica	Messina	Juventus	Messina	Undisclosed	
20 June 2006	Nicola Avitabile	Sanremese	Juventus	ND (Sanremese)	Free	
22 June 2006	Alain Baclet	Gela	Arezzo	Arezzo	Auction, Undisclosed	
20 June 2006	Nicola Beati	Arezzo	Internazionale	Renewed	—	
20 June 2006	Luca Belingheri	AlbinoLeffe	Ascoli	Renewed	—	
22 June 2006	Alessandro Belleri	Avellino	Montichiari	Avellino	Auction, Undisclosed	
22 June 2006	Manuel Belleri	Lazio	Udinese	Lazio	Auction, €400,000	
	Marco Benvenuto	South Tyrol	Triestina	ND (South Tyrol)	Free	
20 June 2006	Matteo Berretti	Potenza	Siena	Renewed	—	
	Emanuele Bianchi	Perugia	Sampdoria	ND (Perugia)	Free	
	Leonardo Bianchi	Portogruaro	Parma	ND (Portogruaro)	Free	
20 June 2006	Saša Bjelanović (Croatia)	Ascoli	Genoa	Ascoli	Undisclosed	
22 June 2006	Daniel Bombardieri	AlbinoLeffe	Atalanta	AlbinoLeffe	Auction, €11,000	
20 June 2006	Matteo Bonatti	Italy	Carrarese	Empoli	Empoli	Undisclosed
20 June 2006	Emiliano Bonazzoli	Italy	Reggina	Parma	Parma	Undisclosed
20 June 2006	Liborio Bongiovanni	Italy	Pro Sesto	Torino	Renewed	
20 June 2006	Alessandro Borgese	Italy	Ancona	Vicenza	Ancona	Undisclosed
20 June 2006	Pierluigi Borghetti	Italy	Crotone	Brescia	Renewed	
20 June 2006	Roberto Bortolotto	Italy	Biellese	Chievo	Renewed	
22 June 2006	Cesare Bovo	Italy	Palermo	Roma	Palermo	€2.05M
20 June 2006	Nicolás Bremec	Uruguay	Arezzo	Carrarese	Arezzo	Undisclosed
20 June 2006	Luca Bretti	Italy	Legnano	Internazionale	ND (Legnano)	
16 June 2006	Yuri Breviario	Italy	Chievo	Atalanta	Chievo	Undisclosed
22 June 2006	Marco Brighi	Italy	Juventus	Rimini	ND (Juventus)	
20 June 2006	Davide Brivio	Italy	Fiorentina	Atalanta	Renewed	
12 June 2006	Cristian Bucchi	Italy	Modena	Chievo	Modena	Undisclosed
20 June 2006	Igor Budan	Croatia	Atalanta	Palermo	Palermo	€1M
9 June 2006	Ivan Buonocunto	Italy	Ascoli	Udinese	Udinese	Undisclosed
9 June 2006	Daniele Buzzegoli	France	Udinese	Empoli	Empoli	Undisclosed
19 June 2006	Matteo Camillini	Italy	Bellaria	Cesena	Renewed	
	Francesco Cangi	Italy	SPAL	Arezzo	ND	
20 June 2006	Michele Canini	Italy	Cagliari	Atalanta	Cagliari	Undisclosed
20 June 2006	Davide Capello	Italy	Olbia	Cagliari	ND (Olbia)	Free
15 June 2006	Francesco Carbone	Italy	Ascoli	Chievo	Chievo	Undisclosed
15 June 2006	Alfredo Cariello	Italy	Ascoli	Chievo	Chievo	Undisclosed
20 June 2006	Filippo Carobbio	Italy	Reggina	AlbinoLeffe	Renewed	
20 June 2006	Mattia Cassani	Italy	Verona	Juventus	Verona	€1.43M
20 June 2006	Matteo Cavagna	Italy	Ravenna	Juventus	Renewed	
12 June 2006	Tommaso Chiecchi	Italy	Modena	Chievo	Chievo	Undisclosed
20 June 2006	Corrado Colombo	Italy	Sampdoria	Atalanta	ND (Sampdoria)	Free
20 June 2006	Paolo Comi	Italy	Roma	Palermo	ND (Roma)	
20 June 2006	Domenico Criscito	Italy	Juventus	Genoa	Renewed	
16 June 2006	Claudio Matias Cuffa	Argentina	Pisa	Chievo	Chievo	Undisclosed
	Antonino D'Agostino	Italy	Atalanta	Udinese	ND (Atalanta)	Free
20 June 2006	Domenico Falco	Italy	Foligno	Ascoli	Renewed	
20 June 2006	Dino Fava	Italy	Treviso	Udinese	Treviso	Undisclosed
16 June 2006	David Silva Fernandes	Brazil	Pergocrema	Chievo	Chievo	Undisclosed
20 June 2006	Carlo Ferrario	Italy	Lecco	Milan	Milan	peppercorn fee
20 June 2006	Luca Fiuzzi	Italy	Cuoiopelli Cappiano	Empoli	Renewed	
	Valerio Foglio	Italy	Vicenza	Atalanta	ND (Vicenza)	Free
20 June 2006	Alessandro Gambadori	Italy	Pisa	Livorno	Livorno	Undisclosed
20 June 2006	Andrea Gasbarroni	Italy	Palermo	Juventus	Juventus	Undisclosed
20 June 2006	Daniele Gastaldello	Italy	Siena	Juventus	Renewed	
16 June 2006	Salvatore Giardina	Italy	Pisa	Chievo	Chievo	Undisclosed
20 June 2006	Jeda	Brazil	Crotone	Vicenza	Crotone	Undisclosed
20 June 2006	Emiliano Landolina	Italy	Chievo	Roma	Renewed	
20 June 2006	Fabio Lebran	Italy	Carrarese	Parma	Renewed	
20 June 2006	Stefano Lorenzi	Italy	Treviso	Atalanta	ND (Treviso)	Free
20 June 2006	Michele Mangiapelo	Italy	Rieti	Sampdoria	ND (Rieti)	Free
20 June 2006	Davide Matteini	Italy	Palermo	Empoli	Renewed	
20 June 2006	Francesco Milano	Italy	Roma	Palermo	ND (Roma)	
20 June 2006	Francesco Modesto	Italy	Reggina	Palermo	Reggina	Undisclosed
20 June 2006	Cristian Molinaro	Italy	Siena	Juventus	Renewed	
20 June 2006	Antonio Nocerino	Italy	Genoa	Juventus	Renewed	
5 June 2006	Martino Olivetti	Italy	Milan	Chievo	Chievo	€1M
22 June 2006	Biagio Pagano	Italy	Sampdoria	Atalanta	Sampdoria	Auction, €205,000
20 June 2006	Matteo Paro	Italy	Siena	Juventus	Juventus	~€0.82M
	Simone Pepe	Italy	Udinese	Palermo	Renewed	
	Vincenzo Pepe	Italy	Pescara	Parma	ND (Pescara)	
9 June 2006	Matteo Piccinni	Italy	Empoli	Udinese	Udinese	Undisclosed
20 June 2006	Felice Piccolo	Italy	Reggina	Juventus	Juventus	Undisclosed
	Fausto Rossini	Italy	Udinese	Atalanta	ND (Udinese)	Free
5 June 2006	Paolo Sammarco	Italy	Chievo	Milan	Milan	Undisclosed
20 June 2006	Gleison Santos	Italy	Monza	Atalanta	Monza	Undisclosed
20 June 2006	Giuseppe Scurto	Italy	Chievo	Roma	Renewed	
19 June 2006	Fabio Virgili	Italy	Napoli	Parma	Parma	€50,000
