= List of Italian football transfers summer 2006 (July) =

This is a list of Italian football transfers for the 2006–07 season. Only moves from Serie A and Serie B are listed.

The summer transfer window ran from 1 July 2006 to the end of the 2005–06 season, with a few transfers taking place prior to the season's complete end.

== July deals ==
Date	Name	Nationality	Moving from	Moving to	Fee
16 January 2006^{1}	William	(Brazil)	Martina	Verona	Free
23 January 2006^{1}	Alessandro Moro		Ascoli	Udinese	Free
26 January 2006^{1}	Marco Marchionni		Parma	Juventus	Free
31 January 2006^{1}	Jaap Stam		Milan	(Netherlands) Ajax	€2.5M
21 February 2006^{1}	Riccardo Bonetto		Empoli	Lazio	Free
10 March 2006^{1}	Alessio Sarti		Milan	Cesena	Free
21 March 2006^{1}	Gianluca Di Giulio		Rimini	Verona	Free
5 May 2006^{1}	Daniele Franceschini		Chievo	Sampdoria	Undisclosed
17 May 2006^{1}	Giuseppe Favalli		Internazionale	Milan	Free
18 May 2006	Abel Aguilar	(Colombia)	Deportivo Cali (Colombia)	Udinese	Undisclosed
22 May 2006^{1}	Max Tonetto		Sampdoria	Roma	Free
24 May 2006	Schumacher	(Brazil)	Atlético Paranaense (Brazil)	Udinese	Undisclosed
24 May 2006	Roberto Guana		Ascoli	Palermo	€3.5M
24 May 2006^{1}	Alberto Fontana		Chievo	Palermo	Free
25 May 2006^{1}	Cristiano Zanetti		Internazionale	Juventus	Free
25 May 2006^{1}	Rui Costa		Milan	Benfica (Portugal)	Free
27 May 2006	Mario Santana	(Argentina)	Palermo	Fiorentina	€6.5M
27 May 2006	Francesco Parravicini		Fiorentina	Palermo	Co-ownership, €1.5M
31 May 2006	Andriy Shevchenko	(Ukraine)	Milan	Chelsea	€43.875M
1 June 2006^{1}	Fabio Liverani		Lazio	Fiorentina	Free
1 June 2006	Sébastien Frey		Parma	Fiorentina	€6M
14 June 2006	Luisito Campisi		Atalanta	Pizzighettone	Loan
15 June 2006	Fábio Simplício	(Brazil)	Parma	Palermo	€7.1M
16 June 2006	Marco Pisano		Sampdoria	Palermo	€4M
16 June 2006	Pietro Accardi		Palermo	Sampdoria	€2M
16 June 2006	Giorgio Corona		Catanzaro	Catania	Undisclosed
19 June 2006	Massimo Donati		Milan	Atalanta	Loan
20 June 2006	Matteo Brighi		Roma	Chievo	Loan
20 June 2006	Isah Eliakwu	(Nigeria)	Internazionale	Triestina	Co-ownership, €450,000
20 June 2006	Ferdinando Coppola		Ascoli	Milan	€200,000
20 June 2006	Gennaro Sardo		Piacenza	Catania	Co-ownership, undisclosed
20 June 2006	Paolo Foglio		Siena	Ascoli	Free
21 June 2006	Ousmane Dabo		Lazio	Manchester City (England)	Free
21 June 2006	Paolo Sammarco		Milan	Chievo	Loan
21 June 2006	Manuele Blasi		Juventus	Fiorentina	Loan, €400,000
21 June 2006	Ilario Aloe		Internazionale	Ravenna	Loan
22 June 2006	Yoann Gourcuff		Rennes (France)	Milan	€4.58M
24 June 2006	Massimo Gobbi		Treviso	Fiorentina	€4.3M
24 June 2006	Gianni Guigou		Fiorentina	Treviso	€40,000
24 June 2006	Reginaldo	(Brazil)	Udinese	Fiorentina	€1M
26 June 2006	Maurizio Domizzi		Sampdoria	Napoli	Co-ownership, €1.25M
26 June 2006	Cristian Bucchi		Modena	Napoli	€4M
27 June 2006	Roberto De Zerbi		Catania	Napoli	€2.5M
27 June 2006	Flavio Lazzari		Cisco Roma	Udinese	Undisclosed
29 June 2006	Gianluca Pagliuca		Bologna	Ascoli	Free
29 June 2006	Stefano Guberti		Torres	Ascoli	Free
29 June 2006	Simone Pesce		Torres	Ascoli	Free
29 June 2006	Michele Paolucci		Juventus (youth)	Ascoli	Loan
29 June 2006	Fabio Grosso		Palermo	Internazionale	€6.5M (€5M + Dellafiore)
29 June 2006	Paolo Hernán Dellafiore		Internazionale	Palermo	€1.5M (part of Grosso)
29 June 2006	Maxwell	(Brazil)	Empoli	Internazionale	€3.1M
1 July 2006	Francesco Renzetti		Genoa	Lucchese	Co-ownership, €250,000
1 July 2006	Emanuele Volpara		Genoa	Lucchese	Co-ownership, €250,000
2006-07-01	Adriano Pereira	Brazil	Palermo	Atalanta	Co-ownership, €0.5M
2006-07-01	Mattia Cassani	Italy	Verona	Palermo	€2.5M
2006-07-01	Gianni Munari	Italy	Verona	Palermo	Co-ownership, €1M
2006-07-01	César	Brazil	Lazio	Internazionale	Free (player exchange)
2006-07-01	Alberto Quadri	Italy	Internazionale	Lazio	Free (player exchange)
2006-07-01	Paolo Cannavaro	Italy	Parma	Napoli	Free
2006-07-01	Antonino Saviano	Italy	Reggina	Chievo	Free
2006-07-01	Andrea Coda	Italy	Empoli	Udinese	Co-ownership, undisclosed
2006-07-01	Emílson Cribari	Brazil	Udinese	Lazio	€3M
2006-07-01	Edgar Álvarez	Honduras	(Uruguay) Peñarol	Roma	€1.3M
2006-07-01	Elvis Abbruscato	Italy	Arezzo	Torino	Undisclosed
2006-07-03	Ricardo Faty	Senegal	(France) Strasbourg	Roma	€0.36M
2006-07-03	Devis Nossa	Italy	Internazionale	San Marino	Co-ownership, €20,000
2006-07-03	Mauro Minelli	Italy	Atalanta	Catania	Co-ownership, undisclosed
2007-07-01	Rocco D'Aiello	Italy	Olbia	Palermo	Co-ownership resolution, €35,000
2006-07-04	Carlo Ferrario	Italy	Milan	Chievo	Co-ownership, €1,000
2006-07-04	Carlo Ferrario	Italy	Chievo	Varese	Loan
4 July 2006	Nicola Ferrari	Italy	Lumezzane	AlbinoLeffe	Undisclosed
2006-07-04	Massimo Mutarelli	Italy	Palermo	Lazio	€0.9M
2006-07-04	Andrea Gasbarroni	Italy	Juventus	Parma	Loan
2006-07-04	Domenico Criscito	Italy	Juventus	Genoa	Loan
2006-07-04	Igli Tare	Albania	Bologna	Lazio	€0.6M
2006-07-04	Luca Ceccarelli	Italy	Cesena	San Marino Calcio	Loan
2006-07-04	Ibrahim Maaroufi	Belgium	(Netherlands) PSV	Internazionale	Undisclosed
2006-07-04	Luca Siligardi	Italy	Dorando Pietri	Internazionale	Undisclosed
2006-07-04	Sebastián Ribas	Uruguay	(Uruguay) Juventud	Internazionale	Undisclosed
5 July 2006	Moris Carrozzieri		Sampdoria	Atalanta	Co-ownership, €1.1M
5 July 2006	Michele Pazienza		Udinese	Fiorentina	Loan, €350,000
5 July 2006	Marco Cassetti		Lecce	Roma	Co-ownership, €1.5M
2006-07-05	José Montiel	(Paraguay)	Olimpia (Paraguay)	Udinese	Undisclosed
2006-07-06	Divine Fonjock	Cameroon	Treviso (youth)	SPAL	Loan
2006-07-06	Eros Schiavon	Italy	Treviso	SPAL	Loan
2006-07-06	Manuel Panini	Italy	Cavese	Catania	Undisclosed
2006-07-06	Gaetano Bertini	Italy	Vicenza	Manfredonia	Undisclosed
2006-07-06	Antonino Bonvissuto	Italy	Vicenza	Manfredonia	Co-ownership, undisclosed
2006-07-06	Tonino Cardiale	Italy	Catania	Foggia	
2006-07-06	Manuel Panini	Italy	Catania	Taranto	Loan
2006-07-06	Cristian Raimondi	Italy	Palermo	Vicenza	€0.74M
2006-07-06	Cristian Daniel Ledesma	Argentina	Lecce	Lazio	€4.5M
2006-07-06	Stefano Mauri	Italy	Udinese	Lazio	€3M
2006-07-06	Elio Nigro	Italy	Napoli	Benevento	Loan
2006-07-06	Gennaro Esposito	Italy	Napoli	Benevento	Loan
7 July 2006	Simone Pepe	Italy	Palermo (& Udinese, c)	Cagliari (& Udinese, c)	€1.5 million
7 July 2006	Antonino D'Agostino	Italy	Atalanta	Cagliari	Loan
7 July 2006	Michael Agazzi	Italy	Triestina	Sassuolo	Loan
7 July 2006	Horacio Erpen	Argentina	Triestina	Sassuolo	Loan
7 July 2006	Salvatore Giardina	Italy	Chievo	Sassuolo	Loan
2006-07-07	Sebastiano Girelli	Italy	Sassuolo	Modena	Undisclosed
2006-07-07	William Jidayi	Italy	Castel San Pietro Terme	Modena	Undisclosed
2006-07-07	Marco Piccinni	Italy	Bari (youth)	Pro Vasto	Loan
2006-07-07	Fabio Quagliarella	Italy	Udinese	Sampdoria	Co-ownership, €1.5M
2006-07-07	Mirko Pieri	Italy	Udinese	Sampdoria	Co-ownership, €0.5M
2006-07-07	Salvatore Foti	Italy	Sampdoria	Udinese	Co-ownership, €2M
2006-07-07	Salvatore Foti	Italy	Udinese	Sampdoria	Loan
2006-07-07	Mark Edusei	Ghana	Sampdoria	Catania	Co-ownership, €0.12M
2006-07-07	Gianvito Plasmati	Italy	Andria	Catania	Co-ownership, undisclosed
2006-07-07	Daniele Ancione	Italy	Catania	Juve Stabia	Loan
2006-07-07	Fabio Fanelli	Italy	Catania	Andria	Loan
2006-07-07	Gaetano Romano	Italy	Catania	Andria	Co-ownership, undisclosed
2006-07-07	Luca Anania	Italy	Lecce	Grosseto	Loan
2006-07-07	Adriano Mezavilla	Brazil	Catania	Cesena	Co-ownership, undisclosed
2006-07-07	Roberto Vitiello	Italy	Vicenza	Rimini	Undisclosed
7 July 2006	Pierre Giorgio Regonesi	Italy	AlbinoLeffe	Rimini	Co-ownership, €1.6M
2006-07-07	Emiliano Landolina	Italy	Chievo	Prato	Loan
2006-07-07	Francesco Carbone	Italy	Chievo	Frosinone	Loan
2006-07-07	Andrea Mengoni	Italy	Chievo	Frosinone	Loan
2006-07-07	Massimo Margiotta	Italy	Vicenza	Frosinone	Loan
2006-07-07	Claudio Matias Cuffa	Argentina	Chievo	Juve Stabia	Loan
2006-07-07	David Silva Fernandes	Brazil	Chievo	Varese	Loan
2006-07-07	Matteo Bartoli	Italy	Chievo	Rovigo	Loan
2006-07-07	Renato Piovezan	Brazil	Chievo	Prato	Loan
2006-07-07	Fabrizio Biava	Italy	Internazionale	Pro Patria	Loan
2006-07-07	Matteo Deinite	Italy	Internazionale	Pizzighettone	Loan
2006-07-07	Matteo Giordano	Italy	Internazionale	Olbia	Loan
2006-07-07	Riccardo Meggiorini	Italy	Internazionale	Cittadella	Loan
2006-07-07	Federico Piovaccari	Italy	Internazionale	Triestina	Loan
2006-07-07	Abdoulay Konko	France	Juventus	Siena	Co-ownership, €1M
2006-07-07	Paolo Zanetti	Italy	Empoli	Ascoli	Co-ownership, undisclosed
2006-07-07	Maicon	Brazil	(France) AS Monaco	Internazionale	Undisclosed
2006-07-07	Fabio Pecchia	Italy	Bologna	Ascoli	Free
2006-07-07	Luca Franchini	Italy	Pro Patria	Mantova	Undisclosed
2006-07-08	Adrian Mutu	Romania	Juventus	Fiorentina	€8M
9 July 2006	Stefano Avogadri	Piacenza	Legnano	Loan	
2006-07-10	Júlio Sérgio	Brazil	(Brazil) América (SP)	Roma	Free
2006-07-10	Alessio Tacchinardi	Italy	Juventus	(Spain) Villarreal	Loan
2006-07-10	Tommaso Berni	Italy	Ternana	Lazio	Loan
2006-07-10	Carlo Gervasoni	Italy	Verona	Bari	Co-ownership, undisclosed
2006-07-10	Luigi Anaclerio	Italy	Bari	Verona	Co-ownership, undisclosed
2006-07-11	Mariano Julio Izco	Argentina	(Argentina) San Telmo	Catania	Undisclosed
2006-07-11	Olivier Dacourt	France	Roma	Internazionale	Free
2006-07-12	Aleksandar Luković	Serbia	(Serbia) Crvena Zvezda	Ascoli	Loan
2006-07-12	Simone Bentivoglio	Italy	Juventus	Chievo	Co-ownership, undisclosed
2006-07-13	Biagio Pagano	Italy	Sampdoria	Rimini	Co-ownership, €0.4M
2006-07-13	Tommaso Chiecchi	Italy	Chievo	Modena	Loan
2006-07-13	Simone Bentivoglio	Italy	Chievo	Modena	Loan
2006-07-13	Carlo Luisi	Italy	Piacenza	Modena	Undisclosed
2006-07-13	Giuseppe Gemiti	Germany	Modena	Piacenza	Loan
2006-07-13	Gaetano D'Agostino	Italy	Messina	Udinese	Undisclosed
2006-07-13	Patrice Feussi	Cameroon	Genoa	Pisa	Free
2006-07-13	Matteo Guardalben	Italy	Palermo	Vicenza	€50,000
2006-07-13	Aimo Diana	Italy	Sampdoria	Palermo	€5M
2006-07-13	Massimo Bonanni	Italy	Palermo	Sampdoria	Co-ownership, €2M
2006-07-13	Christian Terlizzi	Italy	Palermo	Sampdoria	Co-ownership, €1.5M
2006-07-13	Ernesto Terra	Italy	Catania	Arezzo	Undisclosed
14 July 2006	Julien Rantier	France	Verona	Vicenza	Co-ownership resolution, €480,000
14 July 2006	Julien Rantier	France	Vicenza	Piacenza	Co-ownership, €500,000
2006-07-14	Modibo Diakité	France	Pescara	Lazio	Co-ownership, €0.25M
2006-07-14	Daniele Magliocchetti	Italy	Roma (youth)	Verona	Loan
2006-07-14	Leandro Greco	Italy	Roma (youth)	Verona	Loan
2006-07-14	Salvatore Ricca	Italy	Vigor Lamezia	Verona	Free
2006-07-15	Antonio Nocerino	Italy	Genoa	Piacenza	Undisclosed (co-owned with Juventus)
2006-07-17	Massimo Lo Monaco	Italy	Catania	Gallipoli	Undisclosed
2006-07-17	Mattia Graffiedi	Italy	Milan	Triestina	Co-ownership, €0.3M
2006-07-18	Valeri Bojinov	Bulgaria	Fiorentina	Juventus	Loan
2006-07-18	Gaetano Fontana	Italy	Napoli	Ascoli	Free
2006-07-18	Alessio Cossu	Italy	Cagliari	Ravenna	Co-ownership, undisclosed
2006-07-19	Francesco Millesi	Italy	Avellino	Catania	Undisclosed
2006-07-19	Raffaele De Martino	Italy	(Switzerland) Bellinzona	Udinese	Undisclosed
2006-07-19	Riccardo Bolzan	Italy	Chievo	Pisa	Loan
2006-07-19	Lucas Simón	Argentina	(Argentina) Nueva Chicago	Piacenza	Undisclosed
20 July 2006	Angelo Rea	Italy	Cesena	Messina	Co-ownership, undisclosed
20 July 2006	Dario Biasi	Verona	Genoa	Free	
2006-07-20	Manuel Coppola	Italy	Messina	Genoa	Undisclosed
2006-07-20	Daniele De Vezze	Italy	Genoa	Messina	Undisclosed
2006-07-20	Massimo Minetti	Italy	Genoa	Messina	Undisclosed
2006-07-20	Antonio Ghomsi	Cameroon	Genoa	Messina	Free
2006-07-20	Nicola Petrilli	Italy	Juventus	Crotone	Undisclosed
2006-07-20	Viktor Budyanskiy	Russia	Juventus	Ascoli	Co-ownership, undisclosed
2006-07-20	Marco Cellini	Italy	Triestina	AlbinoLeffe	Undisclosed
2006-07-20	Nicola Silvestri	Italy	(Hungary) Sopron	Genoa	Free
21 July 2006	Francesco Battaglia	Italy	Pavia	Chievo	Undisclosed
21 July 2006	Mark Bresciano	Australia	Parma	Palermo	€2.5M
21 July 2006	Igor Budan	Croatia	Palermo	Parma	Loan
21 July 2006	Maurizio Ciaramitaro	Italy	Palermo	Parma	Loan
21 July 2006	Olivier N'Siabamfumu	France	(France) Rennes	Ascoli	Free
2006-07-21	Andrea Gentile	Italy	Messina	Crotone	Loan
2006–07–21	Gianluca Zambrotta	Italy	Juventus	(Spain) Barcelona	€14M
2006–07–21	Lilian Thuram	France	Juventus	(Spain) Barcelona	€5M
2006-07-24	Takayuki Morimoto	Japan	(Japan) Tokyo Verdy	Catania	Loan
2006-07-26	Landry Bonnefoi	France	Juventus	(France) Metz	Loan
2006-07-26	Maurizio Lauro	Italy	Ascoli	Cesena	Undisclosed
2006–07–27	Fabio Cannavaro	Italy	Juventus	(Spain) Real Madrid	€7M
2006–07–27	Emerson	Brazil	Juventus	(Spain) Real Madrid	€16M
2006-07-27	Valentin Năstase	Romania	Bologna	Ascoli	Undisclosed
2006-07-27	Michelangelo Minieri	Italy	Avellino	Ascoli	Undisclosed
2006-07-27	Alessandro Volpe	Italy	Olbia	Empoli	Undisclosed
2006-07-27	Natale Gonnella	Italy	Atalanta	Pescara	Loan
2006-07-29	Daniele Bonera	Italy	Parma	Milan	€3.3M
2006-07-30	Adriano Ferreira Pinto	Brazil	Cesena	Atalanta	Undisclosed

== See also ==
- List of Italian football transfers winter 2006–07
