= Giardina =

Giardina is an Italian surname, derived from Giardino (Garden), may refer to:

- Salvatore Giardina, Textiles adjunct professor, VP Sales & Design
- Anthony Giardina, American writer
- Camillo Giardina (1907–1985), Italian Christian Democrat politician
- Denise Giardina, American novelist
- Giovanna Giardina, Italian film and television actress, also known as Gaia Germani
- Salvatore Giardina, Italian footballer
- Tiffany Giardina (currently known as Stalking Gia), American pop singer
- Timothy Michael "Tim" Giardina (born 1957), U.S. Navy officer and formerly the deputy commander of U.S. nuclear forces
- Umberto Giardina, Italian former international table tennis player

Other

- Giardina Gallotti, a village in the Sicilian province of Agrigento, Italy

== See also ==
- Giardina surname in Sicily
- Giardino (disambiguation)
