= List of Italian football transfers 2006–07 =

List of Italian football transfers 2006–07 may refer to:

- List of Italian football transfers summer 2006 (co-ownership)
- List of Italian football transfers summer 2006 (July)
- List of Italian football transfers summer 2006 (August)
- List of Italian football transfers winter 2006–07
