= List of Italian football transfers summer 2006 =

The summer transfer windows of 2006–07 season was in two phase:

- For the co-ownership deals
  - List of Italian football transfers summer 2006 (co-ownership)
- For the main transfer windows
  - List of Italian football transfers summer 2006 (July)
  - List of Italian football transfers summer 2006 (August)
