= Bombardieri =

Bombardieri is an Italian surname. Notable people with the surname include:

- Daniel Bombardieri (born 1985), Italian footballer
- Tony Bombardieri (born 1978), Italian figure skater
