= Berretti =

Berretti is an Italian surname, may refer to:

- Dante Berretti (1897–1965), Italian football manager and vice-president of FIGC
- Maicol Berretti (born 1989), Sammarinese footballer
- Matteo Berretti (born 1985), Italian footballer

Other

- Campionato Nazionale Dante Berretti, youth tournament named after Berretti.
