= Mario Artistico =

Italian footballer (born 1985)

Personal information
- Date of birth: 3 April 1985 (age 41)
- Place of birth: Rome, Italy
- Height: 1.72 m (5 ft 8 in)
- Position: Forward

Senior career*
Years	Team	Apps	(Gls)
2002–2003	Astrea	8	(0)
2003–2004	US Brescello Piccardo	5	(1)
2004–2005	Monterotondo	32	(23)
2005–2006	Chieti	23	(1)
2006–2009	Cisco Roma	9	(2)
2007	→ Castelnuovo (loan)	13	(2)
2007–2008	→ Massese (loan)	27	(8)
2008–2009	→ Juve Stabia (loan)	19	(3)
2009	→ Pistoiese (loan)	12	(6)
2009–2011	Pescara	17	(3)
2010	→ Gallipoli (loan)	18	(6)
2010–2011	→ Ternana (loan)	12	(1)
2011	→ Lanciano (loan)	6	(1)
2011–2012	Frosinone	17	(3)
2012–2013	Lupa Roma	16	(4)
2013–2014	Rieti		
2014–2015	Monterosi FC		
2016	Cynthia	9	(2)
2016–2017	Anzio	16	(4)
2017	Racing Fondi	0	(0)
2018	Palmese	4	(1)
2018	Anzio	4	(1)
2018–2019	AS Fiumicino SC 1926		
2019	SSD Ronciglione United		
2019–2022	ASD Pro Roma Calcio		
Total		267	(72)
- * Club domestic league appearances and goals

Mario Artistico (born 3 April 1985) is an Italian former footballer who plays as a forward.

== Career ==
=== Early career ===
Born in Rome, capital of Italy, Artistico started his career at three Serie D club, namely Astrea, Brescello and Monterotondo (where he also played for their reserve). Except Brescello, the two other teams were either inside Rome or within the Province of Rome. Monterotondo scored the most goals in Group E that season (64); however, the club finished 7th, 7 points away from the playoff qualifier Albalonga.

Artistico goal scoring record made him earn a professional contract from Serie A club Udinese Calcio. Artistico was immediately farmed to Chieti, a Serie C1 club. However, he had to learn to play in a higher division, which he only scored once.

=== Cisco Roma ===
In mid-2006 he returned to Rome for Cisco Roma in co-ownership deal. He made some improvement in the fourth division, with 2 goals in half season. In January 2007 he was transferred to fellow fourth division club Castelnuovo, which also in the same mini-group. In August 2007 he left for Massese. He made a breakthrough, with 8 goals in the third division. However that is not enough to make Udinese bought back Artistico. Instead Udinese gave up the remain 50% registration rights of Artistico.

He remain in 2008–09 Lega Pro Prima Divisione, the first season third division bored that name. Again he played for two clubs that season, for Juve Stabia and Pistoiese. He found his shoes for the latter, scoring 0.5 goals per game. Artistico also scored in the relegation "play-out", but the team lost the playoff, relegated and then bankrupted.

=== Pescara ===
On 8 July 2009 he was signed by another third division club Pescara. The club also signed forwards Massimo Ganci, Marco Sansovini and Francesco Zizzari. He failed to compete a place in starting XI, despite Antonello Cuccureddu also picked him 8 times in the first half of the season until Cuccureddu was fired after the game against Cavese on 12 January. Artistico played his 9th and last start of the season under new coach Eusebio Di Francesco on 17 January against Lanciano. On 29 January Artistico left for Serie B bottom team Gallipoli with option to co-own the player. Gallipoli relegated and bankrupted at the end of season, while Pescara promoted back to the second division as playoff winner.

Despite Artistico scored 0.33 goals per game in his median Serie B season, Di Francesco excluded Artistico from his 2010–11 Serie B plan. On the last day of transfer window, Artistico was loaned to third division club Ternana. Coach Gabriele Baldassarri regularly picked Artistico as starting forward (9 rounds, from round 3 to 17) but Artistico failed to score. Since the appointment of Manuele Domenicali as head coach, Domenicali only picked Artistico twice, in round 18 and 21 as starting XI. His striking partner Raffaele Nolè, also scored once only before the winter break. Only Romano Tozzi Borsoi had a regular goal scoring record. On 31 January 2011, he last day of transfer window, Artistico was loaned to fellow third division Group B club Lanciano. Artistico made 6 appearances only with the Abruzzo team. Lanciano finished in the mid-table while Ternana almost relegated. His performance did not made either clubs to purchase him outright.

=== Frosinone ===
On 25 July 2011 Pescara made an exchange with Frosinone. Artistico and Simone Vitale joined the Lazio team for €130,000 in 2-year contract and €100,000 in 3-year contract respectively while defender Antonio Bocchetti moved to Abruzzo for €170,000. Artistico himself signed a 2-year contract. Frosinone was 75 km away from Rome and recently relegated from the second division. Yet again Artistico had to compete for the starting place as Eugenio Corini only picked Artistico 7 times as starting forward. Artistico scored 3 goals before the winter break while his competitor Salvatore Aurelio (however also his partner in 4–3–1–2 formation) and Antonino Bonvissuto scored 4 times and 3 times respectively. His old team-mate Ganci, only started 4 times with 2 goals. Among the 7 starts, Artistico was one of the 2 forwards in 4–3–1–2 formation, or one of the forward in 4–3–3 formation.

On 30 July 2012 Frosinone terminated the contract with Artistico in mutual consent.
