= Simone Vitale =

Italian footballer

Personal information
- Date of birth: 1 March 1986 (age 40)
- Place of birth: Balsorano, Italy
- Height: 1.82 m (6 ft 0 in)
- Position: Left back

Youth career
- Pescara

Senior career*
Years	Team	Apps	(Gls)
2004–2011	Pescara	87	(5)
2005–2007	→ Pro Vasto (loan)	57	(2)
2011–2013	Frosinone	29	(1)
2013–2014	Nocerina	6	(0)
2014–2015	Renato Curi Angolana		
2015–2016	Chieti	18	(1)
2016–2018	ASD Spoltore Calcio		
2018–2019	Teramo	2	(0)
2019–2020	ASD Sambuceto Calcio		
Total		199	(9)
- * Club domestic league appearances and goals

Simone Vitale (born 1 March 1986) is a Italian former footballer who played as a left back.

== Biography ==
Born in Balsorano, Abruzzo, Vitale started his career at Abruzzo team Pescara. Vitale was an unused member in 2003 UEFA European Under-17 Football Championship. Vitale made his Serie B debut on 11 September 2004, against Piacenza. On 31 August 2005 he left for Pro Vasto in temporary deal. In summer 2006 the temporary deal was renewed. The club also signed several players from Pescara such as Vincenzo Aridità on 25 August and Alessandro Rapino on 30 August 2006. Pescara was relegated in 2007. Vitale spent 3 seasons with the club in Serie C1 (later renamed to Lega Pro Prima Divisione), winning the promotion back to Serie B as the play-off winner of 2009–10 Lega Pro Prima Divisione. Vitale played once in 2010–11 Serie B.

On 25 July 2011 Vitale left for Frosinone in co-ownership deal for €100,000 in 3-year contract and Mario Artistico in definitive deal for €130,000 in 2-year deal, as part of Antonio Bocchetti's deal, for €170,000. The deals made Frosinone paid Pescara €60,000 cash only. In June 2012 Frosinone acquired Vitale outright for free.

On 2 September 2013 he was signed by Nocerina.

On 31 January 2019 he was released from his contract with Teramo by mutual consent.
