= Borghetti =

Borghetti is an Italian surname that may refer to the following people:

- Carla Borghetti (born 1971), Argentine singer
- Cida Borghetti (born 1965), Brazilian politician
- Gian Paolo Borghetti (1816–1897), Corsican writer, poet and politician
- Guglielmo Borghetti (born 1954), Italian Catholic bishop
- Luigi Borghetti (born 1943), Italian Olympic cyclist
- Michele Borghetti (born 1973), Italian draughts player
- Patricio Borghetti (born 1973), Argentine actor and singer
- Pierluigi Borghetti (born 1984), Italian footballer
- Renato Borghetti (born 1963), Brazilian folk musician and composer

Similar spelling

- Jared Borgetti (born 1973), Mexican footballer
