= Paoloni =

Paoloni is an Italian surname. Notable people with the surname include:

- Marco Paoloni (born 1984), Italian footballer
- Paolo Paoloni (1929–2019), Italian actor
- Alessia Paoloni (born 1985), Italian swimmer
