= Italo Alaimo =

Italian footballer (1938–1967)

Personal information
- Date of birth: 8 September 1938
- Place of birth: Rome, Italy
- Date of death: 17 July 1967 (aged 28)
- Place of death: Novara, Italy
- Height: 1.73 m (5 ft 8 in)
- Position: Winger

Senior career*
Years	Team	Apps	(Gls)
1957–1958	Reggina	0	(0)
1958–1961	Volsinio		
1961	Tevere Roma		
1961–1963	Chieti	58	(9)
1963	Rosignano Solvay	6	(0)
1963–1967	Reggina	115	(12)
- * Club domestic league appearances and goals

Italo Alaimo (9 August 1938 – 17 July 1967) was an Italian footballer who played as a right winger.

Following a successful footballing career in several tiers of Italy's league system, Alaimo died on 17 July 1967 during a medical examination as part of his transfer to Serie B club Novara.

== Playing career ==
Following his release from Reggina in 1958 and his consequent success at lower Serie C clubs, Alaimo earned a move to Chieti, making 58 appearances as his club avoided relegation to Serie D for two straight seasons. Nevertheless, Alaimo then dropped down a division anyway to play for Rosignano Solvay, returning to Reggina in November 1963 and earning promotion with his side to Serie B in the 1964–65 season as they won the title.

In July 1967, following several years of success with Reggina, Alaimo earned a move to fellow Serie B side Novara, with the transfer fee amounting to 35 million lire - one of the largest fees in Italian football at the time.

== Death ==
Following his transfer to Novara and his presentation to the club's fans, Alaimo underwent a routine medical examination in order to officially complete the transfer. Alaimo got on an exercise bicycle to undergo a cardiac stress test. He completed his exercise, but as he began to dismount the bicycle, he was struck by a spasm; despite resuscitation attempts, Alaimo passed away. The cause of death was officially given as an electric shock, and three employees at Ospedale Maggiore (where the medical took place) were charged with negligent homicide.

=== Legacy ===
Following his death, a street in Reggio di Calabria was named Via Italo Alaimo in his honour.
