= Francesco Scotti =

Italian footballer

Personal information
- Date of birth: 8 January 1983 (age 43)
- Place of birth: Rome, Italy
- Height: 1.83 m (6 ft 0 in)
- Position: Goalkeeper

Team information
- Current team: Montecalvo Calcio 1995 (player-coach)

Youth career
- Lazio
- 2001–2002: Cittadella

Senior career*
Years	Team	Apps	(Gls)
2002–2004	Florentia Viola	0	(0)
2003–2004	→ Montevarchi (loan)	28	(0)
2004–2006	Fermana	19	(0)
2006–2007	Ancona	0	(0)
2007	Sansovino	14	(0)
2007–2008	Sangiovannese	8	(0)
2008–2010	San Marino	66	(0)
2010–2011	Sangiovannese	13	(0)
2011–2014	Rimini	108	(0)
2014–2015	Forlì	35	(0)
2016	L'Aquila	19	(0)
2016–2020	Rimini	105	(0)
2020	Notaresco	8	(0)
2020–2021	Rimini	24	(0)
2021–2022	Cattolica	30	(0)
2022–	Montecalvo Calcio 1995		

International career
1998–1999	Italy U15	3	(0)
1999–2000	Italy U16	0	(0)
2000–2001	Italy U17	2	(0)
2002–2004	Italy U20	7	(0)
- * Club domestic league appearances and goals as of 29 October 2026

Francesco Scotti (born 8 January 1983) is an Italian footballer who plays as a goalkeeper for Montecalvo Calcio 1995.

== Club career ==
=== Early career ===
Born in Rome, Lazio, Scotti started his career at hometown club Lazio. In mid-2001 Scotti was signed by Serie B club Cittadella in co-ownership deal.

=== Fiorentina ===
In June 2002 Scotti joined Cittadella outright and re-sold to newly reborn Tuscany traditional club Florentia Viola (now ACF Fiorentina). He was the backup keeper of Andrea Ivan in 2002–03 Serie C2. After the season Fiorentina was invited to 2003–04 Serie B, which saw Ivan became a backup and Scotti left for Montevarchi, a Tuscany minor club.

=== Fermana ===
After la Viola was promoted to 2004–05 Serie A, Scotti was transferred to Serie C1 club Fermana in another co-ownership deal. Scotti was the backup of Mauro Chiodini in 2004–05 Serie C1. In June 2005 Fermana bought Scotti outright. In 2005–06 Serie C1, Chiodini left the Marche club and Scotti shared the starting role with Paolo Iaboni. The club withdrew from professional football in 2006.

=== Ancona & Sansovino ===
On 22 September 2006 Scotti joined Ancona, another team of Marche region. After no appearance in 2006–07 Serie C1, Scotti joined Sansovino (from Monte San Savino, Tuscany), swapped with Alessio Chiaverini. Scotti immediately became the first choice ahead David Pierini.

=== Sangiovannese & San Marino ===
In August 2007 Scotti joined Sangiovannese (from San Giovanni Valdarno, Tuscany). He was the backup of young keeper Alessandro Barberis. However Scotti also played twice in 2007–08 Serie C1 promotion playoffs. Scotti moved to San Marino for San Marino Calcio in 2008–09 Lega Pro Seconda Divisione, where Scotti was the first choice for two seasons. Scotti returned to Sangiovannese in 2010–11 Lega Pro Seconda Divisione. He was the backup of Matteo Vaccarecci until Vaccarecci left the club in January 2011. At the end of season Sangiovannese withdrew from professional league due to financial difficulties.

=== Rimini ===
Scotti joined Italian fourth division newcomer Rimini. Scotti was the first choice of the Romagna team.

=== L'Aquila ===
On 13 January 2016 Scotti was signed by L'Aquila.

=== Return to Rimini ===
On 3 January 2020, he was released from his contract with Rimini by mutual consent.

=== Cattolica ===
On 10 August 2021, he moved to Cattolica, in Serie D.

== International career ==
Scotti had capped for U15 team, at that time a feeder team coached by Rosario Rampanti to prepare for 2000 UEFA European Under-16 Football Championship qualification. Scotti was the backup of Tommaso Berni and Federico Agliardi in the qualifying phase, which was co-coached by Rampanti and Gesualdo Piacenti.

In 2000–01 season Scotti capped for U17 team in 2000 Václav Ježek Tournament to prepare for 2002 UEFA European Under-19 Football Championship qualification (named as a U18 event prior 2001). In "Václav Ježek Tournament" Scotti shared the starting role with Agliardi as the tournament had 4 matches in 5 days. He was dropped from the team in January 2001.

From 2002 to 2004 Scotti was tested by coach Francesco Rocca in 2002–03 and 2003–04 U20 Four Nations Tournament along with Berni, Mario Cassano, Alfonso De Lucia, born 1982 players Vitangelo Spadavecchia, born 1984 players Emanuele Bianchi, Davide Capello, Paolo Comi and Marco Paoloni. However except Berni and Agliardi, none of the players able to enter the U21 team form the feeder team. Scotti also played twice in 2003 Toulon Tournament, including the final against Portugal. The Azzurrini (little azure) lost to Portuguese in 1–3.
