= Stefano Layeni =

Italian footballer

Personal information
- Full name: Stefano Olubunmi Layeni
- Date of birth: 10 March 1982 (age 44)
- Place of birth: Castiglione delle Stiviere, Italy
- Height: 1.98 m (6 ft 6 in)
- Position: Goalkeeper

Youth career
- 1999–2000: Montichiari

Senior career*
Years	Team	Apps	(Gls)
2000–2001	Montichiari	6	(0)
2001–2004	Como	17	(0)
2004–2014	Prato	158	(0)
2006–2007	→ Sassari Torres (loan)	8	(0)
2007	→ Venezia (loan)	0	(0)
2009–2011	→ AlbinoLeffe (loan)	20	(0)
2014	Benevento	0	(0)
2014–2016	GS Grumellese Calcio	6	(0)
2016	Leiknir Faskrudsfjordur		
2016	Fram Reykjavík	18	(0)
2017	Prato	3	(0)
Total		236	(0)
- * Club domestic league appearances and goals

Stefano Olubunmi Layeni (born 10 March 1982) is an Italian former footballer who plays as a goalkeeper. He has Nigerian descent.

== Career ==
Born in Castiglione delle Stiviere, Lombardy to Nigerian parents originary from Lagos, His middle name "Olubunmi" means "gift of God" in the Yoruba language Layeni started his career at Lombardy club Montichiari. In mid-2001, he was signed by Como, but as a third goalkeeper. He finally have a change to play for the club at 2003–04 season, as a backup goalkeeper for Fabrizio Ferron. In mid-2004, he joined Prato, which he was the first choice goalkeeper ahead Americo Gambardella. In mid-2006 the club signed Renato Piovezan and Layeni was loaned out on the whole season. In mid-2008, Davide Grilli was signed as Piovezan replacement, Layeni shared the first choice role with him.

In mid-2009, he was signed by AlbinoLeffe, which all four goalkeeper of the last season were left the club. Layeni played his first match for the club at Coppa Italia, a 1–3 loss to SPAL. He would fight for a startup place against Daniel Offredi, Paolo Branduani and Ivan Pelizzoli. Eventually he was the starting keeper until November lost his place to Pelizzoli.

His loan was extended in 2010–11 season, he also changed his shirt number from 82 to 28. Since Pelizzoli's loan was not extended, Branduani and Offredi left on loan, Layeni started the opening match of the season, ahead new signing Luca Tomasig, despite he wore no.1 shirt. AlbinoLeffe won fellow Serie B club Pescara 3–1 in the Coppa Italia match. In July 2011 return oh his club Prato.

== Honours ==
Como

- Serie B: 2001–02
