= Juriy Cannarsa =

Italian footballer

Personal information
- Date of birth: 22 April 1976 (age 50)
- Place of birth: Turin, Italy
- Height: 1.82 m (6 ft 0 in)
- Position: Defender

Senior career*
Years	Team	Apps	(Gls)
1994–1999	Pescara	70	(1)
1999–2000	Fermana	18	(0)
2000	Pescara	2	(0)
2000–2004	Livorno	114	(3)
2004–2006	Reggina	41	(0)
2006–2008	Frosinone	43	(0)
2009	Salernitana	10	(0)
2010	Arezzo	8	(0)
2010–2011	Savona	10	(1)
2011	Rodengo Saiano	8	(1)
2011–2012	Rosignano	26	(3)
2012–2014	Forcoli		

Managerial career
- 2014–2015: Livorno (youth)
- 2015–2016: Livorno (assistant)
- 2018–2021: Livorno (U19)
- 2021–2022: Apolonia
- * Club domestic league appearances and goals

Juriy Cannarsa (born 22 April 1976) is an Italian football coach and a former defender.

He played 2 seasons (41 games) in the Serie A for Reggina Calcio.

In July 2010, he was signed by Savona.

On 4 January 2015, he was named new assistant coach of Livorno under new boss Ezio Gelain.
