= Daniel Offredi =

Italian footballer (born 1988)

Personal information
- Date of birth: 26 March 1988 (age 38)
- Place of birth: Bergamo, Italy
- Height: 1.90 m (6 ft 3 in)
- Position: Goalkeeper

Team information
- Current team: Rovatovertovese
- Number: 35

Youth career
- Lemine
- 2000–2008: Milan

Senior career*
Years	Team	Apps	(Gls)
2007–2008	Milan	0	(0)
2008–2009	Pro Sesto	29	(0)
2009–2015	Albinoleffe	125	(0)
2010–2011	→ Reggiana (loan)	9	(0)
2015–2017	Avellino	2	(0)
2017	→ Bari (loan)	0	(0)
2017–2019	Südtirol	61	(0)
2019–2022	Triestina	103	(0)
2023	AlbinoLeffe	14	(0)
2023–2025	Villa Valle	2	(0)
2025–	Rovatovertovese	1	(0)
- * Club domestic league appearances and goals as of 4 October 2023

Daniel Offredi (born 26 March 1988) is an Italian professional footballer who plays as a goalkeeper for Serie D club Rovatovertovese.

== Club career ==
=== Early career ===
Offredi is a product of Milan's youth system, which he had joined from Lemine in 2000. After eight years at the club, he was signed by Pro Sesto in a co-ownership deal, which was originally set to last two seasons. However, he was reclaimed by the Rossoneri after the first one.

=== Albinoleffe ===
In July 2009, he was transferred to Albinoleffe in a new co-ownership deal for €50,000. He made his official debut for the club on 21 August, in the opening match of the Serie B against Vicenza. Nonetheless, he was able to make only three appearances during the whole season, as he faced competition from teammates Ivan Pelizzoli, Stefano Layeni and Paolo Branduani for a place in the starting line-up. In spite of that, on 3 June 2010, it was announced he had been signed by Albinoleffe on a permanent basis for €50,000; though the deal also involved the co-ownership of youth team player Giacomo Beretta, whose playing rights have been fully purchased by Milan for €1M.

However, less than two months after his permanent signing, Albinoleffe sent Offredi to Reggiana in a loan exchange for the more experienced Luca Tomasig. Following the loan spell, Offredi came back to Albinoleffe for the 2011–12 season.

=== Triestina ===
On 24 January 2019, he signed a 2.5-year contract with Triestina.

=== Return to AlbinoLeffe ===
On 4 January 2023, Offredi returned to AlbinoLeffe.
