= Antonio Gaeta =

Italian footballer (born 1984)

Personal information
- Date of birth: 4 August 1984 (age 42)
- Place of birth: Naples, Italy
- Height: 1.79 m (5 ft 10 in)
- Position: Forward

Team information
- Current team: Carrarese

Youth career
- Ascoli

Senior career*
Years	Team	Apps	(Gls)
2004–2009	Ascoli	11	(1)
2004–2005	→ Vis Pesaro (loan)	29	(7)
2005–2006	→ Ancona (loan)	19	(4)
2006–2007	→ Pro Vasto (loan)	21	(7)
2009	→ Juve Stabia (loan)	10	(1)
2009–2010	Legnano	24	(11)
2010–	Carrarese	23	(21)
- * Club domestic league appearances and goals

Antonio Gaeta (born 4 August 1984) is an Italian footballer who plays for Lega Pro Prima Divisione team Carrarese.

== Biography ==
=== Ascoli ===
Born in Naples, Campania Gaeta started his career at Marche team Ascoli. He made his Serie B debut on 1 May 2004, replacing Roberto Colacone. That match Ascoli winning Catania 3–1. He then loaned to Serie C1 and Serie C2 teams for 3 successive seasons, as Ascoli promoted to Serie A in 2005 due to Caso Genoa. After Ascoli relegated to Serie B in 2007, he returned to the team. On 12 October 2007 he signed a new 3-year contract and 8 days later played his first league match of the season. He only played 8 goalless matches in 2007–08 Serie B. In the next season he only played twice in January, scored his only goal for Ascoli. He was loaned to Prima Divisione side Juve Stabia on 2 February. However, he unable to give his usual performance in Lega Pro, only scored once in 10 games.

=== Lega Pro bomber ===
On 31 August 2009 he was sold to Seconda Divisione side Legnano. He scored 11 league goals and twice more in promotion playoffs, finished as losing finalists. He also sent off in third match despite as unused bench, and he attacked the fourth officials and suspended 6 games, effective ruled out from the final and the first 5 rounds of the new season.

Legnano was expelled from professional league by Commissione di Vigilanza sulle Società di Calcio Professionistiche (Co.Vi.So.C.) of FIGC at the end of season.

In August 2010 he was signed by fellow second division side Carrarese. That season he became the most effective scorer in Italian professional leagues, scored 21 goals in just 23 games (0.91 goals per games), and was the top-scorer among the 3 groups of the second division (fourth in pyramid) . Despite he did not score any goals in the promotion playoffs and was sent off in semifinal second leg, the team promoted by the goals of Matteo Merini (twice), Maikol Benassi and Nicola Corrent (both once). In 2010–11 Coppa Italia Lega Pro, he played 4 times and did not score any.
