= Marco Sansovini =

Italian footballer (born 1980)

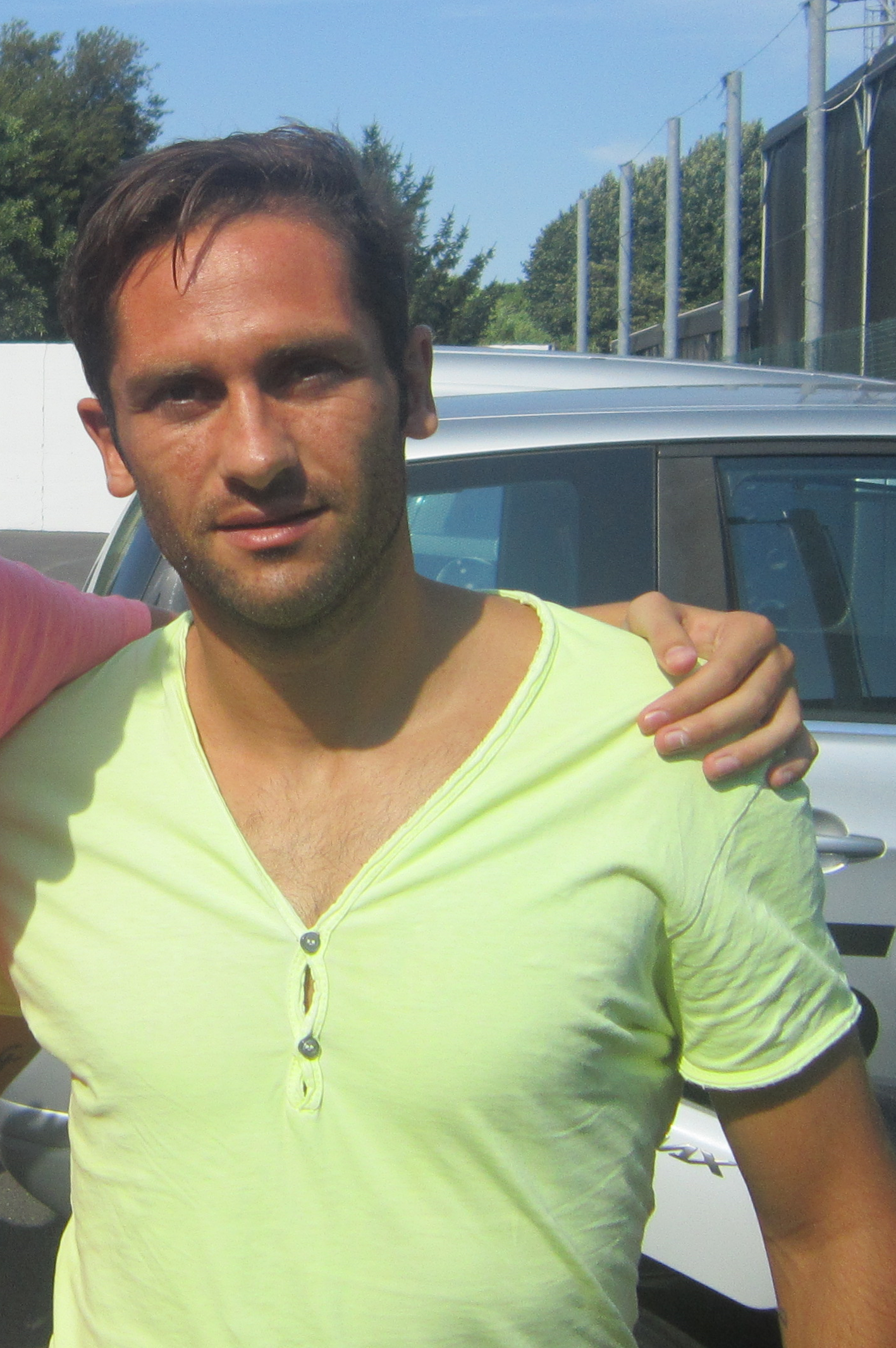
- Sansovini in 2013

Personal information
- Date of birth: 17 June 1980 (age 46)
- Place of birth: Rome, Italy
- Height: 1.76 m (5 ft 9 in)
- Position: Forward

Youth career
- Roma

Senior career*
Years	Team	Apps	(Gls)
1999–2000	Roma	0	(0)
1999	→ Foggia (loan)	4	(0)
2000–2002	Viareggio	56	(10)
2002–2004	Sassari Torres	39	(3)
2003	→ Tivoli (loan)	9	(4)
2004–2006	Pro Sesto	65	(18)
2006–2009	Grosseto	55	(15)
2007	→ Manfredonia (loan)	14	(3)
2007–2008	→ Pescara (loan)	29	(15)
2009–2012	Pescara	110	(31)
2012–2014	Spezia	52	(21)
2014	→ Novara (loan)	19	(8)
2014–2015	Entella	19	(4)
2015	→ Pescara (loan)	15	(6)
2015–2017	Pescara	5	(0)
2016	→ Cremonese (loan)	14	(6)
2016–2017	→ Teramo (loan)	40	(9)
2017–2018	Fermana	29	(5)
2018–2019	Modena	33	(8)
2019–2020	Notaresco	21	(11)
Total		628	(177)

Managerial career
- 2020–2021: Pescara (youth)
- 2021–2022: SPAL (youth)
- 2022–2023: SSD Ortona Calcio
- 2023–2024: Pineto Giovanili
- 2024–2025: Modena U17
- 2025–2026: Sangiustese VP
- 2026–: Fermana
- * Club domestic league appearances and goals

Marco Sansovini (born 17 June 1980), commonly known by the nickname Il Sindaco, is an Italian football coach and former footballer who is currently as a head coach for Fermana.

== Career ==
=== Early career ===
Born in Rome, capital of Italy, Sansovini started his professional career at A.S. Roma. He was loaned to Serie C1 club Foggia in 1998–99 season. In mid-2000 he left for Serie C2 club Viareggio in a co-ownership deal for a peppercorn fee of 1 million Italian lire (about €516) along with Andrea Giallombardo. He only scored twice in 2000–01 Serie C2. In June 2001 Roma gave up the remain 50% registration rights of both Giallombardo and Sansovini. In 2001–02 Serie C2, Sansovini found a way to score with 8 goals. In 2002–03 he changed to play for Serie C1 club Sassari Torres. However, he only scored once in the first half of the season. In January 2003 he was loaned to fourth-tier team Tivoli. Sansovini only played 9 times, but with an impressive 4 goals, nearly 0.44 goals per game. Sansovini returned to Sardegna in 2003–04 Serie C1. However, he only played 615 minutes in the whole season with 2 goals.

Sansovini transferred to Pro Sesto of Italian fourth-tier in mid-2004. He netted 7 goals for the 2004–05 Serie C2 Group A champion. He also scored even more goals in 2005–06 Serie C1 (11 goals). Sansovini previously only had 3 Serie C1 goals in his accounts, with Torres. However Pro Sesto also had a second least goal scoring record and none of a players scored in the relegation "play-out". His striking partners, all failed to score. (Marcos de Paula, 4 goals in half season; Leandro Lázzaro, twice; Claudio Salvi, once) However Pro Sesto re-admitted to Italian third-tier as numbers of club was expelled from that division due to different reasons. Despite remaining in Serie C1, Sansovini was sold to fellow third-tier club Grosseto.

=== Grosseto ===
Sansovini was signed by Grosseto in mid-2006. He had a mix seasons with the Tuscany club. Sansovini did not have a place in 2006–07 Serie C1. He also failed to score in the first half of the season until he left for Manfredonia.

In late August 2007 he left for Pescara. The team was newly relegated from Serie B while Grosseto promoted to 2007–08 Serie B as third division group A winner. Once again Sansovini won a place in starting eleven and converted the chance to 16 goals. However Franco Lerda did not trust any one of the rest of the strikers, while he used forwards such as Luis Maria Alfageme (half-season), Nico De Lucia (half-season) and Nicola Falomi (half-season) as the partner of Sansovini in the formation. Despite the rotation of the squad, Pescara collected the most goals among the group and missed the promotion both by aggregate result against Perugia and 1 point penalty.

Sansovini's ability made Grosseto offering second chance to him. In his maiden second division, Sansovini scored 15 goals, a goal shy than last season (16 goals). His goal scoring partner Thomas Pichlmann also scored a considerable goals (12 goals) but not for Alessandro Pellicori, Ferdinando Sforzini (half-season) and Marco Carparelli (half-season). Grosseto entered the promotion play-off, losing to Livorno 4–3 in the first round/semi-finals. Eventually Livorno was the winner. Sansovini played both match with only one goal, while his partner Pichlmann (first match) and Pellicori (second match) failed to score. In 2009–10 Serie B, Sansovini was the starting forward along with Pichlmann. He failed to score and he was surprisingly sold to third division club Pescara on the last day of summer transfer window. On the same day Grosseto signed Joelson as replacement and Alfageme few days earlier, in temporary deal and co-ownership deal for peppercorn respectively.

=== Return to Pescara ===
On 31 August 2009, he returned to Pescara in a definitive deal, in a four-year contract for €600,000 transfer fee, rejoining former Grosseto coach Antonello Cuccureddu. Despite Sansovini was one of the starting forward with 26 starts, Sansovini only scored 4 times, only 1 more than his backup Francesco Zizzari and Mario Artistico (half-season). Another new signing Massimo Ganci scored 8 goals with lesser start and Samuele Olivi scored 4 goals as a defender. Both Sansovini and Ganci scored in the promotion playoffs of the third division and Pescara promoted.

Sansovini again found his shoes in 2010–11 Serie B with 11 goals. However Ganci and new signing Cristian Bucchi and Stefano Giacomelli all failed to score. Instead, winger Massimo Bonanni was the second goalscorer of the team with 5 goals only. Pescara finished in the mid-table (13th /22teams) with 16th goal scored and 9th least goal conceded.

Sansovini remained in the starting XI in 2011–12 Serie B. That season Zdeněk Zeman used 4–3–3 formation. That season, Sansovini played 41 rounds with 16 goals, scoring his first ever hat-trick on 22 October 2011 in Pescara's 4-1 win against Ascoli. Pescara also signed Juventus wonder-kid Ciro Immobile and Napoli rising star Lorenzo Insigne. The team had the most powerful goal scoring ability with 90 goals; Immobile was the league topscored with 28 goals, while Insigne had 18 goals and Sansovini was the third of the team.

By the end of the season, Sansovini totalled 39 goals in a Pescara shirt, overtaking club legend Bruno Nobili as Pescara's top-scorer of all times.

=== Spezia ===
Despite failed to keep Immobile and Insigne whom both joined Pescara in temporary deals, as well as coach Zeman, Sansovini also left the club on 21 June 2012 to Serie B newcomer Spezia for €150,000 fee in a two-year contract. On 25 July 2013, Sansovini added one more year to the contract. On 10 January 2014, he was signed by Novara in temporary deal.

=== Virtus Entella ===
On 19 July 2014, he was signed by Virtus Entella.

=== Second return to Pescara ===
On 2 February 2015, Sansovini returned to Pescara in a temporary deal; Aniello Cutolo moved to opposite direction on the same day. On 27 June Pescara signed him outright.

On 27 January 2016, Sansovini was signed by Lega Pro club Cremonese in a temporary deal.

=== Teramo ===
On 20 July 2016, Sansovini left for Teramo in a two-year loan.

=== Serie D ===
On 5 August 2019, he joined Serie D club San Nicolò Notaresco.

== Coaching career ==
Sansovini was appointed as coach of Pescara's under-16 team in the summer of 2020. In February 2021, he was promoted to the first team as the assistant of head coach Gianluca Grassadonia.

In the summer of 2021, he leaves Pescara to become the new manager of SPAL's under-16 team. At the end of the season, he doesn't renew his contract with the club from Ferrara.

In November 2022, Sansovini is appointed as head coach of SSD Ortona Calcio, a club playing in the Abruzzo Eccellenza league. However, he is not able to avoid relegation, with the team dropping down to Promozione.

In August 2023, Sansovini joined Pineto Giovanili and is currently in charge of the club's Primavera team.

== Honours ==
Pro Sesto

- Lega Pro Seconda Divisione: 2004–05

Grosseto

- Lega Pro Prima Divisione: 2006–07

Pescara

- Serie B: 2011–12
