= Matteo Bonatti =

Italian footballer (born 1981)

Personal information
- Date of birth: 24 March 1981 (age 45)
- Place of birth: Livorno, Italy
- Height: 1.84 m (6 ft 0 in)
- Position: Centre back

Senior career*
Years	Team	Apps	(Gls)
2000–2002	Empoli	0	(0)
2000–2002	→ Prato (loan)	44	(1)
2002–2003	Foggia	18	(0)
2003–2006	Carrarese	84	(2)
2006–2007	Empoli	0	(0)
2006–2007	→ Massese (loan)	26	(1)
2007–2008	Massese	19	(3)
2008	Lucchese	3	(0)
2008–2009	Empoli	0	(0)
2008–2009	→ Gallipoli (loan)	19	(0)
2009–2010	Lumezzane	13	(0)
2010	→ U Cluj (loan)	3	(1)
2010–2011	Rosignano		
2011	U Cluj	0	(0)
Total		229	(8)
- * Club domestic league appearances and goals

Matteo Bonatti (born 24 May 1981) is a Italian former footballer who plays as a centre back.

== Biography ==
Bonatti spent most of his career in Tuscany and fully or half owned by Empoli. He also spent 2000–2006 seasons in Italian fourth highest level and from 2006 to December 2009 played at the third highest level.

Born in Livorno, Tuscany, Matteo Bonatti started his career at Empoli. Since 2000, he left for various Lega Pro clubs on loan and in co-ownership deal before formally ended his contract with Empoli in 2010. Bonatti then signed by Serie D club Rosignano.

Bonatti played for Tuscany club Prato in 2000–01. That window Empoli also signed Alessandro Diamanti in exchange. In mid-2002, he left for Foggia in co-ownership deal. In June 2003, he returned to Empoli and left for another Tuscany club Carrarese. He was the regular of the team, survived from the relegation "play-out" in May 2004. He partnered with Davide Mandorlini in the first leg and Andrea Raggi in the second leg.

In May 2006, he played both legs of the relegation "play-out", partnering Alfonso Caruso. The team survived from relegation.

Bonatti returned to Empoli again in June 2006 and left for Massese on loan with option to sign half of the registration rights. He played 26 Serie C1 games and on 2 July 2007 Massese excised the rights.

On 31 January 2008, he was signed by Lucchese. The co-ownership was renewed in June but in July Empoli bought back Bonatti from the bankrupted team. Empoli also signed his team-mate Maikol Benassi. He was loaned to another Prima Divisione (ex – Serie C1) team Gallipoli, winning the promotion to Serie B.

In August 2009 he was signed by Lumezzane. In February 2010 he left for Romanian team Universitatea Cluj. In June Empoli gave up the remains 50% registration rights to Lumezzane. On 4 September Lumezzane terminated the contract with Bonatti. On the same day he was signed by non-professional team Rosignano. The club located in Rosignano Marittimo, the Province of Livorno.

== Honours ==
- Lega Pro Prima Divisione: 2009
- Supercoppa di Lega di Prima Divisione: 2009
