= Marco Paoloni =

Italian footballer

Personal information
- Full name: Marco Paoloni
- Date of birth: 21 February 1984 (age 42)
- Place of birth: Civitavecchia, Italy
- Height: 1.86 m (6 ft 1 in)
- Position: Goalkeeper

Youth career
- Roma
- 2003–2004: → Teramo (loan)

Senior career*
Years	Team	Apps	(Gls)
2004	Roma	0	(0)
2004	→ Teramo (loan)	4	(0)
2004–2005	Teramo	17	(0)
2005–2006	Ternana	6	(0)
2006–2008	Ascoli	9	(0)
2006–2007	→ Teramo (loan)	29	(0)
2008–2011	Cremonese	55	(0)
2011	Benevento	11	(0)
Total		125	(0)

International career
2002	Italy U18	4	(0)
2002–2003	Italy U19	8	(0)
- * Club domestic league appearances and goals

Marco Paoloni (born 21 February 1984) is an Italian former professional footballer who played as a goalkeeper. He served a nine-year suspension from football following his involvement in the 2011 Italian football scandal.

== Club career ==
Born in Civitavecchia, the Province of Rome, Paoloni started his career at AS Roma.

=== Teramo ===
But in summer 2003, he left Roma's Primavera for Serie C1 side Teramo Calcio and played the last 4 matches of the 2003–04 season. In the next season, he was the first choice ahead Paolo Mancini until January.

=== Ternana ===
Paoloni was signed by Serie B side Ternana in co-ownership deal from Teramo in 2005, where he played as Tommaso Berni's backup, along with Lorenzo Bucchi. In June 2006, Teramo won the auction to bought back Paoloni 50% registration rights.

=== Ascoli ===
Paoloni was re-sold to Ascoli from Teramo in another co-ownership deal and signed a 3-year contract on 31 August. As part of the deal, Giovanni Amodeo also moved to Teramo in another co-ownership deal for undisclosed fee. Paoloni was loaned back to Teramo, where he remained as first choice.

That season Teramo finished 8th in Serie C1. In June 2007, Teramo gave up the remain rights to Ascoli and went bankrupt soon after. In 2007–08 season, he was the backup of Massimo Taibi. In August 2008, he mutually terminated his contract with Ascoli which would expire in June 2009,

=== Cremonese ===
Since terminated his contract with Ascoli, Paoloni joined Udinese Calcio on free transfer, which sent him to Cremonese in another co-ownership deal. At Cremona, Paoloni was Giorgio Bianchi's backup in first half of the season, but since January he was the first choice goalkeeper.

In June 2010, Cremonese bought him outright. In January 2011 he moved to Benevento in exchange for goalkeeper Gabriele Aldegani and forward Joelson.

=== Italian football scandal ===
On 1 June 2011, Paoloni was arrested following an investigation that showed he had poisoned his own team's water bottles in a failed attempt to throw a game against Paganese to settle outstanding gambling debts. Further investigation showed he had also worked as an agent for match fixers in games he was not personally involved in in Serie B and Lega Pro. Italian FA (FIGC) subsequently issued him a 5-year ban; on 18 June 2012, the term was extended another 4 years.

== International career ==
Paoloni capped for Italy U19 team at 2003 UEFA European Under-19 Championship, ahead Andrea Ivaldi, which Italy won the tournament. He also call-up to 2003–04 Four Nations Tournament (between Switzerland, Germany and Austria) first match against Switzerland U20 team, behind Emanuele Bianchi as backup. In the next 5 matches of the tournament, he never received any call-up again, as the coach has tested Tommaso Berni (already played for U21 in 2002), Mario Cassano, Bianchi, Alfonso De Lucia, Francesco Scotti, Davide Capello and Paolo Comi in the U21 feeder team. Due to club performance, he never received U21 call-up.
