= Francesco Cangi =

Italian footballer

Personal information
- Date of birth: 15 December 1982 (age 43)
- Place of birth: Città di Castello, province of Perugia, Italy
- Height: 1.82 m (5 ft 11 1/2 in)
- Positions: Right-back; left-back

Team information
- Current team: Sansepolcro

Senior career*
Years	Team	Apps	(Gls)
1999–2001	Sansepolcro	53	(5)
2001–2002	Castel di Sangro Calcio	2	(1)
2002–2004	Arezzo	21	(0)
2004–2005	Sora	0	(0)
2005–2006	SPAL	22	(0)
2006–2008	Massese	44	(7)
2008	Lucchese	6	(1)
2008–2009	Gallipoli	23	(4)
2009–2013	Hellas Verona	74	(3)
2012	→ Cremonese	13	(0)
2013	→ Perugia	12	(0)
2013–2014	Castel Rigone		
2014–2015	Ancona		
2015–	Sansepolcro		
- * Club domestic league appearances and goals

Francesco Cangi (born 15 December 1982) is an Italian footballer who played for Sansepolcro.
