= Giardino =

Giardino is Italian for garden. It may refer to:

- Giardino (album), 2011 album by Finnish krautrock band Circle
- Giardino Bellini, urban park of Catania, Italy
- Giardino, Capalbio, village in the province of Grosseto, Italy
- Il Giardino Armonico, Italian early music ensemble who use period instruments
- Palazzo del Giardino, historic palace in Parma, Italy
- Santi Angeli Custodi a Città Giardino (Holy Guardian Angels), church on Via Alpi Apuane, Rome
- Villa Giardino, town in the province of Córdoba, Argentina

== People with the surname ==
- Gaetano Giardino (1864–1935), Italian soldier who became Marshal of Italy during World War I
- Patrik Giardino (born 1966), Swedish photographer and director based in America
- Vittorio Giardino (born 1946), Italian comic artist, author of Little Ego
- Walter Giardino (born 1960), Argentine guitarist, composer, and leader of the heavy metal and hard rock band Rata Blanca
