= Giardina Gallotti =

Human settlement in Agrigento, Sicily, Italy

Coordinates: 37.352°N 13.518°E

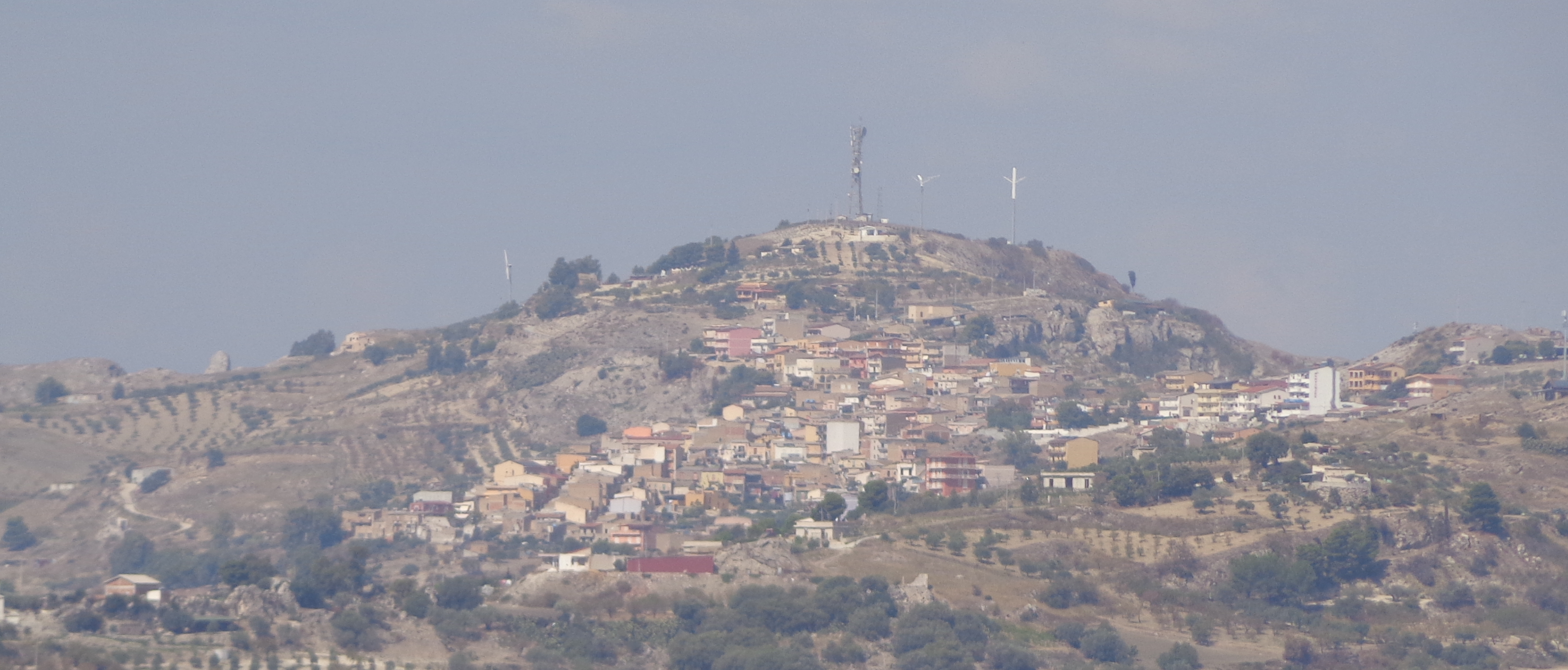

Giardina Gallotti is a village of approximately 1200 inhabitants in the Sicilian province of Agrigento. It is part of the municipality of Agrigento.
