= Giovanni Taormina =

Italian footballer

Personal information
- Date of birth: 8 May 1988 (age 38)
- Place of birth: Agrigento, Italy
- Height: 1.68 m (5 ft 6 in)
- Position: Midfielder

Team information
- Current team: Viareggio

Youth career
- Sampdoria

Senior career*
| Years | Team | Apps | (Gls) |
| 2005–2009 | Sampdoria | 0 | (0) |
| 2005–2006 | → U.S.O. Calcio (loan) | 15 | (0) |
| 2006–2007 | → Alessandria (loan) | 31 | (0) |
| 2008 | → Sorrento (loan) | 4 | (0) |
| 2008–2009 | → Como (loan) | 25 | (0) |
| 2009– | Viareggio | 38 | (1) |
| 2010 | → Carrarese (loan) | 8 | (0) |
- * Club domestic league appearances and goals as of 20:07, 6 May 2010 (UTC)

Giovanni Taormina (born 8 May 1988 in Agrigento) is an Italian professional football player currently playing for F.C. Esperia Viareggio.

In 2009, he was transferred to Viareggio in co-ownership deal. In January 2010 he was loaned to Carrarese as part of Roberto Falivena's deal. In June 2010, Sampdoria gave up the remain 50% registration rights to Viareggio. He made a breakthrough in 2010–11 season, played 31 league matches plus twice in relegation playoffs. He also played 2 out of 6 games in 2010–11 Coppa Italia Lega Pro.
