= Renato Piovezan =

Brazilian footballer

Personal information
- Full name: Renato Moulin Piovezan
- Date of birth: 24 April 1986 (age 40)
- Place of birth: Cachoeiro de Itapemirim, Brazil
- Height: 1.84 m (6 ft 0 in)
- Position: Goalkeeper

Youth career
- Vasco
- Cruzeiro
- Chievo

Senior career*
Years	Team	Apps	(Gls)
2005–2010	Chievo	0	(0)
2005–2006	→ Castellana (loan)	?	(?)
2006–2008	→ Prato (loan)	48	(0)
2008–2009	→ Mezzocorona (loan)	13	(0)
2009–2010	→ Aris Thessaloniki (loan)	0	(0)
- * Club domestic league appearances and goals as of Estrela do Norte -ES 2012

Renato Moulin Piovezan (born 24 April 1986) is a Brazilian footballer who plays as a goalkeeper.

== Career ==
Born in Cachoeiro de Itapemirim, Brazil, Piovezan had spent his youth career for Chievo's Allievi Nazionali U17 and Primavera under-20 team. He then spent on loan at Serie D team Castellana and Serie C2 team Prato (along with Chievo teammate Emiliano Landolina), ahead Stefano Layeni and Americo Gambardella as starting keeper. That season he also selected by Lega Pro under-20 representative team in international youth tournament, as understudy of Gaetano Romano. In mid-2007 Prato bought Piovezan and Landolina in co-ownership deal and also borrowed Nicolò Brighenti and Diego Reis from Chievo. He made 22 league appearances in 2007–08 Serie C2. In June Prato bought the remain 50% registration rights of Landolina and sold Piovezan back to Chievo. However Piovezan joined another Seconda Divisione team Mezzocorona in another co-ownership deal, as understudy of Massimo Macchi. In June 2009 Chievo bought back Piovezan for a second time but he was transferred to Greek side Aris Thessaloniki on 31 August, after played for Aris in friendly as a trail player. Ca. 2010 he was released by Chievo.

== Honours ==
- Trofeo Città di Arco: 2003 (Chievo U-17)
