= Stefano Avogadri =

Italian former footballer

Personal information
- Date of birth: 11 August 1985 (age 41)
- Place of birth: Treviglio, Italy
- Height: 1.83 m (6 ft 0 in)
- Position: Midfielder

Youth career
- Piacenza

Senior career*
Years	Team	Apps	(Gls)
2004–2012	Piacenza	114	(3)
2006–2008	→ Legnano (loan)	21	(0)
2012–2013	Petrolul Ploiești	1	(0)
2013–2014	Cremonese	27	(0)
2014–2015	Ascoli	33	(0)
2015–2016	Robur Siena	15	(0)
2016–2017	Pisa	29	(0)
Total		240	(3)
- * Club domestic league appearances and goals as of 24 September 2019 (UTC)

Stefano Avogadri (born 11 August 1985) is an Italian former footballer.

== Biography ==
Born in Treviglio, Lombardy, Avogadri started his professional career at Emilian club Piacenza. He followed the club relegated to the third division in 2011. In 2012 Avogadri became a free agent after the collapse of the former Serie A team. In October 2012 Avogadri joined Romanian club Petrolul Ploiești. In January 2013 he returned to Italy for the third division side Cremonese. He renewed his contract in June 2013.

In 2014 Avogadri was signed by Ascoli.
