= Vincenzo Aridità =

Italian footballer

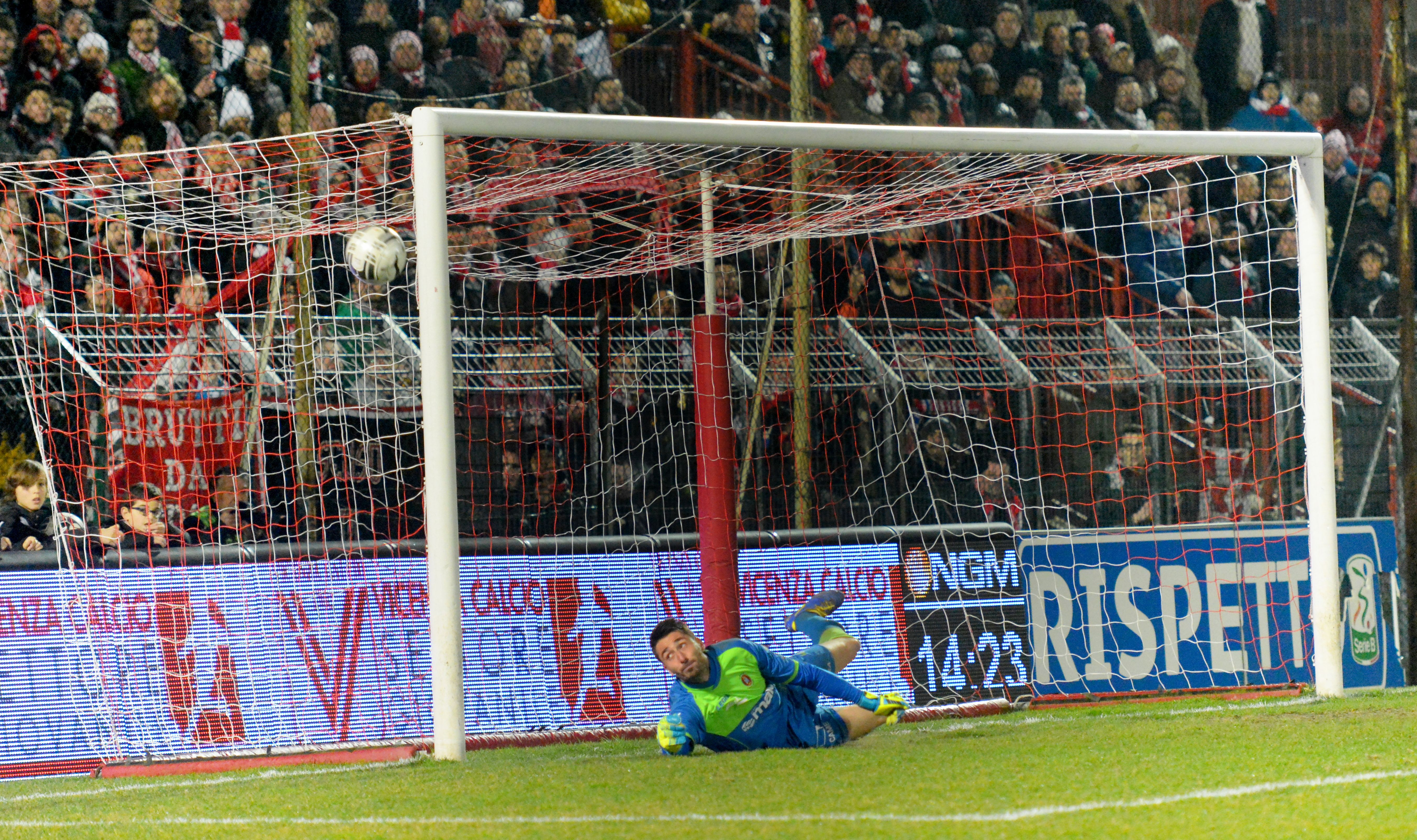

Personal information
- Date of birth: 20 July 1985 (age 41)
- Place of birth: Villaricca, Italy
- Height: 1.84 m (6 ft 0 in)
- Position: Goalkeeper

Youth career
- Pescara

Senior career*
Years	Team	Apps	(Gls)
2005–2008	Pescara	3	(0)
2006–2007	→ Pro Vasto (loan)	34	(0)
2008–2016	Virtus Lanciano	73	(0)
2016–2018	Sambenedettese	39	(0)
Total		149	(0)
- * Club domestic league appearances and goals

Vincenzo Aridità (born 20 July 1985) is an Italian former footballer who plays as a goalkeeper.

== Biography ==
Born in Villaricca, the Province of Naples, Campania, Aridità started his career at Abruzzo club Pescara. He made his Serie B debut on 28 May 2006, against Mantova. That match, the last round of 2005–06 Serie B, Aridità replaced Michele Tardioli in the second half. In 2006–07 Serie B Aridità selected no.22 shirt, due to the club retired his old number no.12. On 25 August 2006 Pescara signed Vitangelo Spadavecchia in temporary deal, thus Aridità left for Pro Vasto also in temporary deal on the same day. Aridità played all the game of 2006–07 Serie C2. Both Pescara and Pro Vasto were relegated, to Serie C1 and Serie D respectively. Aridità became the backup keeper of Pescara again but in 2007–08 Serie C1.

On 8 September 2008 Aridità left for Lanciano initially in 2-year contract. He was one of the protagonist in 2011–12 Lega Pro Prima Divisione which the club won the playoffs for promotion. Aridità was one of the backup for Nicola Leali and then Luigi Sepe in 2012–13 and 2013–14 Serie B respectively. Despite Aridità wore no.1 shirt, he was the second keeper in the 2013–14 Coppa Italia and then became third in the opening game of 2013–14 Serie B (Angelo Casadei was the starting keeper in round 1 as Sepe injured and from round 2 (as of round 4) Casadei was on the bench).
