= Gianluca Falsini =

Italian footballer and manager

Personal information
- Date of birth: 2 October 1975 (age 51)
- Place of birth: Arezzo, Italy
- Height: 5 ft 9 in (1.75 m)
- Position: Left back

Senior career*
Years	Team	Apps	(Gls)
1993–1995	Parma	1	(0)
1995–1996	Gualdo	22	(0)
1996–1997	Monza	31	(0)
1997–1998	Padova	21	(0)
1998–2000	Verona	69	(1)
2000–2004	Parma	19	(0)
2002	→ Atalanta (loan)	10	(0)
2002–2004	→ Reggina (loan)	53	(0)
2004–2006	Siena	48	(0)
2006–2007	Catania	5	(0)
2008	Arezzo	5	(0)
2008–2009	Padova	25	(0)
2010	Legnago Salus	6	(1)
- * Club domestic league appearances and goals as of 2008-05-02

Gianluca Falsini (born 2 October 1975 in Arezzo) is an Italian football manager and former player, who played as a defender. He last played for Legnago Salus, and formerly also played in Serie A for Verona, Parma, Atalanta, Reggina, Siena and Catania.

== Playing career ==
Born in Arezzo, Tuscany region, Falsini started his career at Parma of Emilia-Romagna region. In 1995, he was farmed to Gualdo, Monza and Padova before being signed by Verona in 1998, where he won promotion to Serie A in 1999. In 2000, he returned to Parma of Serie A. In January 2000 he was loaned to Atalanta of Serie A after just playing 6 league matches in the season. In 2002, he left for Reggina of Serie A on loan for 2 seasons. In 2004, he signed a 3-year contract with Siena. In August 2006, he signed a 3-year contract with Catania. and released in November 2007.

In January 2008, he returned to his hometown club Arezzo. In August 2008, he signed a contract with Padova winning the promotion playoffs. In March 2010, he signed a contract with Legnago Salus.
