= Vito Di Bari =

Italian footballer (born 1983)

Personal information
- Date of birth: 7 April 1983 (age 43)
- Place of birth: Trani, Italy
- Height: 1.77 m (5 ft 10 in)
- Position: Centre back

Team information
- Current team: Salernitana (head coach)

Senior career*
Years	Team	Apps	(Gls)
2000–2001	Bitonto	15	(1)
2001–2003	Melfi	57	(0)
2003–2004	Sambenedettese	2	(0)
2004–2005	Fermana	44	(1)
2005–2007	Frosinone	7	(0)
2006	→ Cremonese (loan)	12	(0)
2006–2007	→ San Marino (loan)	14	(1)
2007	→ Martina (loan)	8	(0)
2007–2009	Taranto	31	(2)
2008	→ Verona (loan)	7	(2)
2009–2011	Cosenza	37	(1)
2011	Andria	14	(0)
2011–2012	Taranto	25	(3)
2012–2013	Reggina	26	(0)
2013–2014	Venezia	23	(2)
2014–2016	Pistoiese	47	(4)
2016	Catanzaro	14	(2)
2016–2017	Rieti	17	(1)
2017–2018	Audace Cerignola	24	(2)
2018	Bitonto	11	(0)
2018–2019	Taranto	21	(0)
2019–2020	Calcio Corato	17	(1)
2020–2021	Molfetta	30	(2)

Managerial career
- 2022: Fidelis Andria
- 2024–: Casarano
- * Club domestic league appearances and goals

Vito Di Bari (born 7 April 1983) is an Italian association football coach and former player, currently in charge of Serie C Group C club Salernitana.

== Playing career ==
Born in Trani, Di Bari started his career at Promozione club Bitonto. He then left for Serie D team Melfi (fifth division until 2014). In 2003, he left for Sambenedettese and in January 2004 left for Fermana.

In July 2005 he was signed by Frosinone. In January 2006 he was signed by Serie B club Cremonese. At the end of season Cremonese relegated and Frosinone promoted to Serie B as playoffs winner. Neither club wanted Di Bari and he left for San Marino. In the next season he left for Apulia team Taranto. However he left for Verona in January 2008.

Di Bari joined another southern Italy side Cosenza in July 2009 (of Calabria region) In January 2011 he left for hometown club Andria BAT along with Tommaso Coletti. Cosenza also signed Kris Thackray as part of the deal. Despite made 11 starts for the team, he was sold to Taranto as part of the deal to sign Matteo Berretti definitely (who already on loan at Andria since August 2010).

In 2012, he joined Serie B club Reggina. He wore a No. 21 shirt.

On 27 August 2013 Di Bari and Francesco Cernuto were signed by the third division club F.B.C. Unione Venezia. Di Bari signed a 2-year contract.

On 15 July 2014 he was signed by Pistoiese.

On 12 July 2019, it was confirmed that Di Bari had joined USD Corato Calcio.

== Coaching career ==
In July 2021, Di Bari signed for Fidelis Andria as a youth coach, being promoted in charge of the first team, in the Serie C league, later in January 2022 following the dismissal of head coach Ciro Ginestra. He departed by the end of the season. He successively signed for Bari, joining the youth coaching staff of the Biancorossi and, successively, working alongside Federico Giampaolo in charge of the first team by the end of the 2023–24 Serie B season.

On 12 December 2024, Di Bari was appointed new head coach of Serie D club Casarano. Under his tenure, Di Bari guided Casarano to win promotion to Serie C, and was successively confirmed in charge of the team.
