= Francesco Zizzari =

Italian footballer (born 1982)

Personal information
- Date of birth: 31 May 1982 (age 44)
- Place of birth: Foggia, Apulia, Italy
- Height: 1.83 m (6 ft 0 in)
- Position: Forward

Senior career*
Years	Team	Apps	(Gls)
2000–2001	ASD Stuoie Baracca Lugo	30	(4)
2001–2002	Brindisi	28	(4)
2002–2008	Spezia	31	(4)
2003	→ Pordenone (loan)	0	(0)
2004–2005	→ Pavia (loan)	32	(10)
2005–2006	→ Pistoiese (loan)	26	(4)
2006–2007	→ Grosseto (loan)	32	(7)
2007	→ Lucchese (loan)	12	(1)
2008–2009	Ravenna	27	(15)
2009–2010	Pescara	21	(3)
2010–2012	Reggina	20	(1)
2011–2012	→ Siracusa (loan)	25	(2)
2013	Bassano	10	(1)
2013–2014	Foggia	11	(1)
2014–2015	Gavorrano	38	(16)
2015–2016	Sestri Levante	22	(7)
2016	Ponsacco	5	(2)
2016–2017	Sporting Recco	11	(2)
2017–2018	USD Pietrasanta Marina 1911		
2018–2019	SSD Zenith Audax Prato		
2019	Castelfiorentino United		
2020–2021	ASD Viaccia Calcio		
2021–2022	SSD ARL Amici Miei		
2022–2023	ASD Hellas Chiesina		
Total		370	(84)
- * Club domestic league appearances and goals

Francesco Zizzari (born 31 May 1982) is an Italian former footballer who plays as a forward.

== Career ==
=== Early career ===
Born in La Spezia, Liguria (some reported in Foggia, Apulia, ) Zizzari started his career in Serie D teams in Lugo, Emilia-Romagna and Brindisi, Apulia. He won the champion of Group H in 2001–02 Serie D. Zizzari then signed by Spezia. he made his league debut for Spezia in 2003–04 Serie C1. Zizzari then spent 3 seasons out on loan in various Serie C1 teams. He made a breakthrough with A.C. Pavia in 2004–05 Serie C1, reaching the finals of promotion playoff. Pavia lost to Mantova in aggregate, 1–6. In August 2007 he was signed by Lucchese. In January 2008, Zizzari returned to La Spezia. In his median Serie B season, he scored twice. The club relegated and bankrupted after the season, thus Zizzari became a free agent.

=== Ravenna ===
Zizzari was signed by Ravenna on 7 August 2008. He scored 15 goals in 2008–09 season, the first season since the third tier renamed to Lega Pro Prima Divisione. While his partner, Davis Curiale and Luca Gerbino Polo scored nearly 1 goal per game with 8 goals in half season and 5 goals respectively. Zizzari also scored two goals in the promotion playoff against Padova, losing 2–3 in the first round/semi-finals. However Ravenna decided to sell Zizzari to raise fund in transfer market.

=== Pescara ===
Zizzari was signed by fellow third-tier club Pescara in a co-ownership deal for €300,000. Zizzari re-joined former Grosseto teammate Marco Sansovini and former coach Antonello Cuccureddu. However Sansovini secured a place in starting line-up but Zizzari only able to play 11 starts, a reverse compared to 2006–07 season. However Zizzari had a better goal scoring record of 3 goals, 1 goal lesser than Sansovini. That season Massimo Ganci was the team goalscorer of 8 goals. He made substitute appearances in the promotion playoffs. He scored once for the playoff winner. In June 2010 Pescara bought the remain 50% registration rights from Ravenna by submitting a higher bid (just €500) than Ravenna to Lega Pro, a mechanism to decide the ownership when both clubs failed to form an agreement. However Zizzari did not included in the Serie B plan of Pescara.

=== Reggina ===
Zizzari was signed by fellow Serie B club Reggina in another co-ownership deal on 16 July 2010, for €400,000, rejoining Ravenna coach Gianluca Atzori. On the same day Emmanuel Cascione also moved from Reggina to Pescara in a co-ownership deal for €440,000. In his median season for Reggina, Zizzari made 20 league appearances but only started half of them. Atzori preferred Emiliano Bonazzoli and Alessio Campagnacci as starting forward. Zizzari scored his only goal near the end of season (round 39) against Varese, a 1–1 draw. Both Varese and Reggina entered the promotion playoff. (along with Padova and Novara) Reggina was paired with Novara and losing to Novara by lower seeding. Eventually Novara won the playoff. Zizzari only played the first leg as the substitute of Bonazzoli. After the arrival of Roberto Breda on 23 June 2011 as new coach, Zizzari also ruled out from 2011–12 Serie B plan of Reggina. Pescara also gave up the remain 50% registration rights of Zizzari to Reggina on 24 June, the deadline of co-ownership market. In the same window, Pescara acquired Cascione for an additional €100,000.

On 23 July 2011 he was signed by third-tier club Siracusa in a 1-year loan. Coached by Andrea Sottil, Siracusa was the first in the winter break. However Zizzari did not found his form and the coach preferred Mohamed Fofana (who never partnered Zizzari in the formation) and Adriano Montalto as starting forwards (or as the only starting centre forward). Zizzari only made 5 starts, either as a centre forward in 4–2–3–1 formation (two times) or one of the two forwards in 4–3–1–2/4–4–2 formation at the very first of 2011–12 season (two times plus against Prato on 27 November when playmaker Mancosu rested).

=== Lega Pro clubs ===
On 31 January 2013 Zizzari was signed by Bassano of Lega Pro Seconda Divisione as a free agent. He made 7 substitute appearances for the Veneto club in 2012–13 Lega Pro Seconda Divisione. On 3 September 2013 he was signed by Foggia Calcio in a 1-year contract. The club was admitted to Lega Pro Seconda Divisione from Serie D on 5 August 2013 to fill the vacancies, however, the southern Italian club must finished 8th or above in 2013–14 season in order to avoid relegation back to Serie D due to the merger of Prima Divisione and Seconda Divisione of Lega Pro. On 31 January 2014 Zizzari was released by Foggia. He was signed by fellow fourth-tier club Gavorrano.

=== Serie D ===
Zizzari followed Gavorrano to play in 2014–15 Serie D. In July 2015 he was signed by Sestri Levante. In 2016, he was signed by Ponsacco.

== Honours ==
Brindisi

- Serie D (Group H): 2001–02

Grosseto

- Lega Pro Prima Divisione (Group B): 2006–07
- Supercoppa di Lega di Prima Divisione: 2007
