= Rocco D'Aiello =

Italian footballer

Personal information
- Date of birth: 28 June 1986 (age 40)
- Place of birth: Palermo, Italy
- Height: 1.84 m (6 ft 0 in)
- Position: Central defender

Team information
- Current team: Casarano

Youth career
- Palermo

Senior career*
Years	Team	Apps	(Gls)
2005–2006	Olbia	12	(0)
2006–2010	Gela	99	(2)
2010	→ Torino (loan)	3	(0)
2010–2012	Triestina	13	(0)
2011–2012	→ AlbinoLeffe (loan)	16	(0)
2012–2014	Trapani	23	(1)
2014	Messina	12	(0)
2014–2015	Matera	32	(1)
2015	Gubbio	13	(1)
2015–2016	Foligno	15	(0)
2016–2017	Bisceglie	28	(2)
2017	Taranto	16	(0)
2018–2019	Como	2	(0)
2019-	Casarano	?	(?)
- * Club domestic league appearances and goals

Rocco D'Aiello (born 28 July 1986) is an Italian footballer who plays as a defender for Casarano.

== Biography ==
D'Aiello started his career at Palermo. In mid-2005 D'Aiello left for Olbia with option to purchase half of the rights for €20,000. In July 2006 Palermo excised the buy-back option for €35,000 (made Olbia received €15,000 in net from Palermo) and re-sold to Gela in co-ownership deal along with Antonino Di Franco for a peppercorn fee of €500 each. In June 2007 Palermo gave up he remain 50% registration rights of D'Aiello and Di Franco to Gela for free.

After 3 1/2 seasons in Lega Pro divisions, in January 2010 D'Aiello left for Serie B club Torino in a temporary deal.

On 31 August 2010 he was signed by another Serie B club Triestina in another co-ownership deal. After the club relegated to Lega Pro Prima Division, he was signed by Serie B club AlbinoLeffe on 31 August 2011 in a loan deal. Triestina bankrupted in 2012.

D'Aiello then 3 seasons in 3 different Lega Pro clubs.

In summer 2015 he was signed by Gubbio. On 18 December 2015 he was signed by Foligno.

In summer 2016 he was signed by Bisceglie.
