= Martino Olivetti =

Italian footballer

Personal information
- Full name: Martino Olivetti
- Date of birth: 24 May 1985 (age 41)
- Place of birth: Mantua, Italy
- Height: 1.80 m (5 ft 11 in)
- Positions: Midfielder; forward

Youth career
- Mantova
- Chievo
- 2003–2004: A.C. Milan

Senior career*
Years	Team	Apps	(Gls)
2004–2006	A.C. Milan	0	(0)
2004–2005	→ Vis Pesaro (loan)	31	(0)
2005–2006	→ SPAL (loan)	31	(1)
2006–2007	Chievo	0	(0)
2006–2007	→ Prato (loan)	29	(2)
Total		91	(3)
- * Club domestic league appearances and goals

Martino Olivetti (born 24 May 1985) is a former Italian footballer.

== Biography ==
Born in Mantua, Lombardy, Olivetti started his career at Mantova, then Chievo at Verona, Veneto. In 2003, he was sold to A.C. Milan in co-ownership deal for €1 million. That season, also saw Chievo signed Paolo Sammarco in another co-ownership deal, for €1.1 million. After a season at Primavera Team. He was loaned to Serie C1 and C2 for Vis Pesaro and SPAL, where he played as a regular starter. In June 2006, Chievo bought back Olivetti for €250,000 (shown in the financial filing as €1 million financial debt minus €750,000 financial income of Milan) and Sammarco went back to Milan for undisclosed fee, but returned to Chievo on loan, but Olivetti went to Serie C2 side Prato for another season.

Olivetti then terminated his contract with Chievo and retired. He told the press he was a victim of false accounting.

In June 2008, Olivetti and Sammarco appeared in an FIGC announcement. The Italian FA announced, after investigation found Chievo had inflated the price of Olivetti in order to gain false profit, and other means of false accounting, in order to pass the financial test, made Chievo would be the 7th club to be punished after A.C. Milan, Inter, Sampdoria, Genoa, Reggina and Udinese.
