= Paolo Sammarco =

Italian footballer (born 1983)

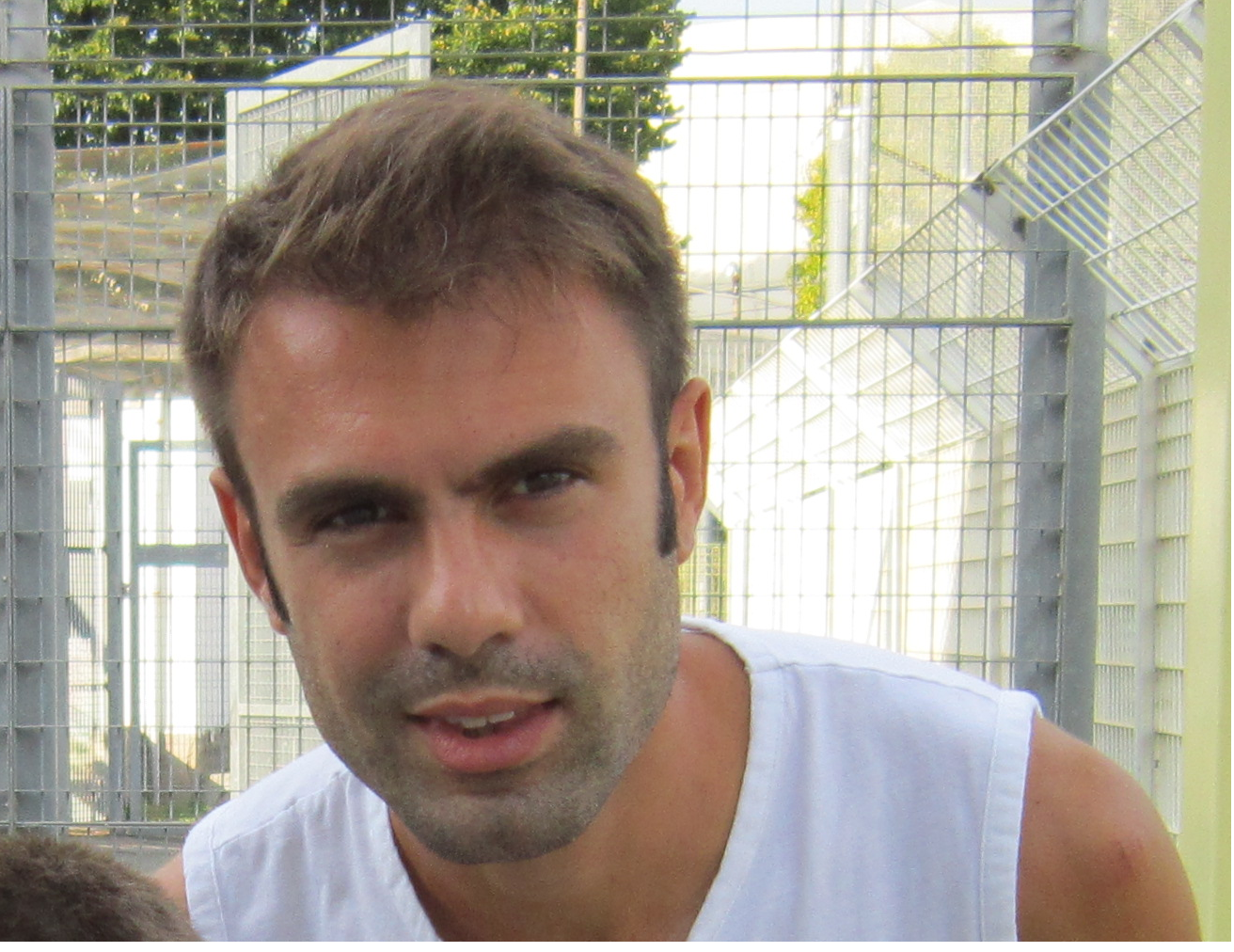

Personal information
- Date of birth: 17 March 1983 (age 43)
- Place of birth: Como, Italy
- Height: 1.83 m (6 ft 0 in)
- Position: Midfielder

Team information
- Current team: Lumezzane (head coach)

Youth career
- AC Milan

Senior career*
Years	Team	Apps	(Gls)
2002–2003	AC Milan	0	(0)
2002–2003	→ Viterbese (loan)	24	(0)
2003–2006	Chievo	39	(0)
2003–2004	→ Prato (loan)	30	(1)
2006–2007	AC Milan	0	(0)
2006–2007	→ Chievo (loan)	32	(2)
2007–2012	Sampdoria	64	(6)
2009–2010	→ Udinese (loan)	26	(0)
2011	→ Cesena (loan)	15	(1)
2011–2012	→ Chievo (loan)	28	(2)
2012–2015	Spezia	66	(1)
2015–2019	Frosinone	110	(8)
2019–2020	Virtus Verona	17	(0)
2020–2021	Arzignano	32	(0)

International career
2000–2001	Italy U18 (Note: U17 prior 2001 equivalent to today U18)	3	(0)
2001	Italy U19	5	(0)
2005–2006	Italy U21	9	(0)

Managerial career
- 2021–2022: Ambrosiana
- 2026: Hellas Verona (interim)
- 2026–: Lumezzane
- * Club domestic league appearances and goals

Paolo Sammarco (born 17 March 1983) is an Italian professional football manager and former player who played as a midfielder. He is the head coach of Serie C club Lumezzane.

== Playing career ==
=== Chievo ===
A product of European giants AC Milan's youth system, Sammarco never played a game for the side, serving consecutive loans: from 2002 to 2004 in Serie C1, and from 2004 to 2007 with first division side A.C. ChievoVerona. Cheivo also purchased half of the registration rights for €1.1 million (Martino Olivetti plus €100,000) in June 2003. In June 2006 Milan bought back Sammarco for undisclosed fee, with Olivetti moved back to Chievo for €250,000.

=== Sampdoria ===
On 22 June 2007, U.C. Sampdoria announced Sammarco, in another co-ownership deal with Milan, for €1.5 million fee and a reported €400,000 wage. In Sampdoria, he broke through, playing almost every league game in a team that achieved UEFA Cup qualification, under coach Walter Mazzarri.

In June 2008, Sampdoria gained full ownership of Sammarco for another €2.5 million, and his value increased to €4 million. Sammarco also signed a new contract which lasted until 30 June 2013 during 2009–10 season. On 25 August 2009 he was loaned to Udinese for one season, for a reported wage of €250,000. Sammarco was a sub under Luigi Delneri at the first match of 2009–10 Serie A.

On returning to Sampdoria for the beginning of the 2010–11 season, he did not appear in any games, as the club now hired Domenico Di Carlo as coach. However, his wage was increased to €700,000. He was loaned to Cesena on 30 December 2010 for the rest of the season.

He scored a goal in the first two games of 2011–12 Coppa Italia for Doria, however on 24 August he returned to Chievo in exchange with Simone Bentivoglio, re-uniting Di Carlo. Sammarco's wage was also reduced to €250,000 again.

=== Spezia ===
On 9 August 2012 he joined Spezia Calcio.

=== Frosinone ===
On 21 January 2015, Sammarco was signed by Frosinone. He scored his first goal in Serie A for the club on 28 October 2015 in a 2–1 defeat of Carpi.

=== Virtus Verona ===
On 15 October 2019, he joined Serie C club Virtus Verona until the end of the season.

=== Serie D ===
On 12 August 2020, he moved to Arzignano.

== International career ==
Sammarco was first capped for the Italy national under-21 team in August 2005, against France, and was part of the final squad in the 2006 UEFA European Championship, making three appearances as a starter.

== Coaching career ==
=== Ambrosiana ===
On 23 November 2021, he was appointed caretaker manager by Serie D club Ambrosiana, after joining the club as an assistant coach in the summer of 2021.

=== Hellas Verona ===
On 3 February 2026, he was named interim manager of Serie A club Hellas Verona. He left his position at the end of the season following the relegation of the club to Serie B after seven seasons in the top flight.

=== Lumezzane ===
On 9 June 2026, Sammarco was announced as the new head coach of Serie C club Lumezzane, signing a one-year contract.
