= Antonino Bonvissuto =

Italian footballer (born 1985)

Personal information
- Date of birth: 8 August 1985 (age 41)
- Place of birth: Palermo, Italy
- Height: 1.85 m (6 ft 1 in)
- Position: Forward

Youth career
- Fincantieri Palermo
- 2003–2004: Vicenza

Senior career*
Years	Team	Apps	(Gls)
2004–2006	Vicenza	1	(0)
2004–2005	→ Olbia (loan)	20	(3)
2005–2006	→ Ancona (loan)	11	(1)
2006–2007	Manfredonia	28	(3)
2007–2008	Lanciano	26	(7)
2008–2011	Bari	0	(0)
2008–2009	→ Cittadella (loan)	26	(6)
2009–2010	→ Crotone (loan)	29	(9)
2010–2011	→ Ascoli (loan)	10	(1)
2011	→ Sorrento (loan)	8	(0)
2011–2012	Frosinone	24	(6)
2012–2013	Cremonese	6	(1)
2013	Reggiana	11	(0)
2013–2014	Torres	24	(6)
2014–2015	Arezzo	29	(3)
2015	Sambenedettese	11	(4)
2015–2016	RapalloBogliasco	8	(1)
2016–2017	L'Aquila	5	(0)
2017–2019	Polisportiva Castelbuono		
Total		277	(51)
- * Club domestic league appearances and goals

Antonino Bonvissuto (born 8 August 1985) is an Italian former footballer who plays as a forward.

== Biography ==
=== Early career ===
Born in Palermo, Sicily, Bonvissuto started his career at Fincantieri Palermo. In 2003, he left for Vicenza on loan, along with Alessandro Borgese. He made his Serie B debut on 12 June 2004, against Livorno. He then spent 2 seasons in Serie C2, for Olbia and Ancona. He joined Borgese for the latter. In 2006, he was sold to Manfredonia in a co-ownership deal in multi-year contract, joining Gaetano Bertini. Manfredonia acquired the remain 50% registration rights from Vicenza in June 2007, but on 1 September he was sold to Lanciano. He scored 7 goals in his second Serie C1 season.

=== Bari ===
He signed a pre-contract with Serie B club Bari in April, and presented on 1 July. In August, he left for fellow second division club Cittadella. He scored 6 goals in his true maiden Serie B season. That season Bari won the cadetto (champion), Bonvissuto again was not inside the team plan. He left for newly promoted team Crotone and scored a career high of 9 goals.

In July, he was signed by Ascoli, his fifth Serie B club. However, he only played 10 times in the league. In January 2011 he left for Lega Pro Prima Divisione (ex–Serie C1) club Sorrento.

He returned to the city of Bari for 2011–12 pre-season, wore an unusual 91 shirt. On the same day that Bari signed Marcos de Paula, Bonvissuto left the club.

=== Frosinone ===
In August 2011 he left for another L.P. Prime Division club Frosinone in a 1+2-year contract. He played a successive games in the league, which he started every game except the first round as sub and suspended for 3 games from round 7 to 9. Most of the game he partnered with Salvatore Aurelio. (as of 30 October 2011)

=== Cremonese ===
In 12 October 2012, Bonvissuto was signed by Cremonese.

=== Reggiana ===
In 17 January 2013, Bonvissuto was signed by Reggiana.

=== Torres ===
On Summer of 2013, he was signed by Torres.

=== Arezzo ===
In Summer of 2014, he was signed by Arezzo.

=== Vigor Lamezia ===
On 21 August 2015 Bonvissuto was signed by Vigor Lamezia.
