= Matteo Berretti =

Italian footballer

Personal information
- Date of birth: 4 April 1985 (age 41)
- Place of birth: Cecina, Italy
- Height: 1.85 m (6 ft 1 in)
- Position: Midfielder

Team information
- Current team: Poggibonsi

Youth career
- Cecina
- 2002–2004: Siena

Senior career*
Years	Team	Apps	(Gls)
2004–2005	Siena	0	(0)
2004–2005	→ Aglianese (loan)	34	(3)
2005–2009	Potenza	112	(12)
2009–2011	Taranto	9	(0)
2010	→ Cavese (loan)	5	(0)
2010–2011	→ Andria (loan)	24	(2)
2011–2012	Andria		
2012–2013	Fano		
2013	Città di Giulianova		
2013–2014	SPAL		
2014–2015	Agropoli		
2015–2016	Jolly Montemurlo		
2016–	Poggibonsi		
- * Club domestic league appearances and goals

Matteo Berretti (born 4 April 1985) is an Italian footballer who plays for Poggibonsi.

== Biography ==
Born in Cecina, Tuscany, Berretti started his career at Cecina. In 2002, he joined Siena. He left for Aglianese on loan and in mid-2005 sold to Potenza in co-ownership deal. In June 2007 Siena sold the remains 50% registration rights to Potenza. He was the regular starter of the team, made 112 league appearances in 4 seasons. He also sold to Arezzo in another co-ownership deal in September 2008 but bought back in June 2009. He won promotion to Serie C1 as play-offs winner in 2007.

In July 2009 he joined Taranto while in June Potenza bought back Rosario Falcone from Taranto. He only played nine times in 2009–10 Lega Pro Prima Divisione before left for Cavese in January 2010.

In August 2010 he left for Andria while in July 2011 he was exchanged with Vito Di Bari of Andria.
