= Emiliano Landolina =

Italian footballer (born 1986)

Personal information
- Full name: Emiliano Landolina
- Date of birth: 23 July 1986 (age 40)
- Place of birth: Rome, Italy
- Height: 1.84 m (6 ft 0 in)
- Position: Midfielder

Team information
- Current team: Calenzano

Youth career
- Roma
- 2005–2006: Chievo

Senior career*
Years	Team	Apps	(Gls)
2006–2008	Prato	13	(0)
2008–	Calenzano	?	(?)
Total		13	(0)
- * Club domestic league appearances and goals

Emiliano Landolina (born 23 July 1986) is an Italian footballer who plays as a midfielder for Calenzano in Serie D.

== Career ==
Landolina started his career at hometown club A.S. Roma. In summer 2005, along with Giuseppe Scurto, they were sold to Chievo in co-ownership deal. In July 2006, he was farmed to Serie C2 side Prato along with Renato Piovezan. In June 2007, Chievo got all the remain registration rights from Roma and sold half of the registration rights to Prato.

In summer 2008, he left for Serie D side A.C. Calenzano.

In summer 2011, he left for Promozione Toscana side U.S.D. Art.Ind. Larcianese of Larciano. After winning the Coppa Italia 2011-12 and the following Regional Playoff of Tuscany, Larcianese was promoted to Eccellenza Toscana and Emiliano Landolina remained at Larciano.
