= Carlo Ferrario =

Italian footballer (born 1986)

Personal information
- Full name: Carlo Emanuele Ferrario
- Date of birth: 20 November 1986 (age 39)
- Place of birth: Porlezza, Italy
- Height: 1.80 m (5 ft 11 in)
- Position: Forward

Team information
- Current team: Virtus CiseranoBergamo

Youth career
- Morbegno
- 1999–2005: Milan

Senior career*
Years	Team	Apps	(Gls)
2005–2006	Lecco	29	(5)
2006–2007	Chievo	0	(0)
2006–2007	→ Varese (loan)	23	(2)
2007–2010	Prato	79	(19)
2010–2012	Monza	44	(11)
2012–2013	Cuneo	38	(6)
2013–2014	Bra	11	(3)
2014	Torres	6	(0)
2014–2015	Argentina	26	(9)
2015–2016	Bra	34	(32)
2016–2017	Monza	28	(10)
2017–2018	Pergolettese	35	(30)
2018–2020	Modena	50	(26)
2020–2021	Giana Erminio	27	(2)
2021–2022	Sangiuliano City	32	(15)
2022–2023	Varese	26	(8)
2023–2025	Villa Valle	65	(24)
2025–	Virtus CiseranoBergamo	27	(4)

International career
2005–2006	Italy U20 "C"	5	(1)
- * Club domestic league appearances and goals as of 2 August 2026

Carlo Emanuele Ferrario (born 20 November 1986) is an Italian footballer who plays as a forward for Serie D club Virtus CiseranoBergamo.

== Career ==
Born in Porlezza, Lombardy, Ferrario was signed by Lombard and Serie A club Milan in the 1999–2000 season. In 2005, he left for Lecco in co-ownership deal. In summer 2006 he left for Chievo in another co-ownership deal (for a peppercorn fee of €1,000) and Chievo bought him outright in 2007 after he was loaned to Varese along with David Silva Fernandes. In summer 2007 he left for Prato in another co-ownership deal, along with Lorenzo Cecchi, which Prato bought him outright in June 2009.

In July 2010, he was signed by Monza, and he returned in 2016.

On 27 January 2012, he joined Cuneo after failing to score any goal in the 2011–12 season.

On 3 September 2020, he signed a 2-year contract with Giana Erminio.

On 31 August 2021, he signed for Serie D club Sangiuliano City.

== Honours ==
=== Club ===
Monza

- Serie D: 2016-17
