= David Silva Fernandes =

Brazilian footballer (born 1986)

Personal information
- Date of birth: 29 July 1986 (age 40)
- Place of birth: Açailândia, Brazil
- Height: 1.73 m (5 ft 8 in)
- Position: Defender

Youth career
- Chievo

Senior career*
Years	Team	Apps	(Gls)
2004–2008	Chievo	0	(0)
2004–2005	→ Trento (loan)	33	(2)
2005–2006	→ Pergocrema (co-ownership)	14	(1)
2006–2008	→ Varese (loan)	58	(0)
2008–2009	Varese	26	(0)
2009–2010	Legnano	29	(0)
- * Club domestic league appearances and goals

David Silva Fernandes (born 29 July 1986) is a Brazilian former professional footballer who played as a defender.

Silva Fernandes spent his whole professional career at Italian Seconda Divisione (ex-Serie C2) and Serie D. He left Legnano at Lega Pro Seconda Divisione in 2010 after the club went bankrupt.

== Career ==
After playing a season at Serie D side Trento, Silva Fernandes left for Pergocrema in a co-ownership bid, from Chievo in summer 2005. In June 2006, he was bought back by the Verona club., and loaned him to Varese, along with Carlo Emanuele Ferrario. His loan was extended in July 2007 and Valquinei de Jesus Santos joined him on loan. Varese also had an option to sign him outright in June 2008 On 18 July 2008, he was confirmed in Varese squad.

Silva Fernandes won Lega Pro Seconda Divisione Group A champion in summer 2009, but sold to Legnano on 31 August 2009. He was still there a year later, when the club folded.

== Honours ==
- Lega Pro Seconda Divisione: 2009
