= Alessandro Gambadori =

Italian footballer and coach (born 1981)

Personal information
- Full name: Alessandro Gambadori
- Date of birth: 3 January 1981 (age 45)
- Place of birth: Senigallia, Italy
- Height: 1.80 m (5 ft 11 in)
- Position: Midfielder

Team information
- Current team: Casalguidi 1923 (head coach)

Senior career*
| Years | Team | Apps | (Gls) |
| 1998–2000 | Ascoli | 6 | (0) |
| 2000–2001 | Chieti | 28 | (0) |
| 2001–2002 | L'Aquila | 35 | (1) |
| 2003–2004 | Pavia | 27 | (0) |
| 2004–2007 | Livorno | 7 | (0) |
| 2005 | → Pavia (loan) | 18 | (1) |
| 2006 | → Pisa (loan) | 16 | (0) |
| 2006–2007 | → Sassuolo (loan) | 31 | (1) |
| 2007–2008 | Pistoiese | 25 | (2) |
| 2008–2011 | Varese | 47 | (2) |
| 2011 | → Monza (loan) | 13 | (0) |
| 2011–2012 | Casale | 34 | (1) |
| 2012–2014 | Pistoiese | | |
| 2014–2016 | Arezzo | 60 | (0) |
| 2016 | AD Valdinievole Montecatini | 14 | (2) |
| 2016–2017 | Ghivizzano Borgo a Mozzano | 18 | (0) |

Managerial career
- 2018–: Casalguidi 1923
- * Club domestic league appearances and goals

Alessandro Gambadori (born 3 January 1981) is an Italian retired professional football player and current head coach of Italian Prima Categoria team Casalguidi 1923 Calcio.

He played 2 games in the Serie A in the 2004/05 season for A.S. Livorno Calcio.

== Career ==
=== Coaching career ===
In May 2018 it was confirmed, that 37-year old Gambadori would become the head coach of Italian Prima Categoria team Casalguidi 1923 Calcio from the 2018–19 season, as well as he also would coach the clubs 2006-team.
