= Pierluigi Borghetti =

Italian footballer

Personal information
- Date of birth: 18 November 1984 (age 41)
- Place of birth: Brescia, Italy
- Height: 1.82 m (5 ft 11 1/2 in)
- Position: Centre-back

Team information
- Current team: Anconitana

Youth career
- Brescia
- 2002–2003: → Lumezzane (loan)

Senior career*
Years	Team	Apps	(Gls)
2003–2005	Lumezzane	54	(0)
2005–2009	Crotone	73	(3)
2009–2011	Ternana	62	(1)
2011–2012	Perugia	11	(0)
2019-	Anconitana	0	(0)

International career
2004–2005	Italy U-20 Serie C	?	(?)
- * Club domestic league appearances and goals as of 27 November 2011

Pierluigi Borghetti (born 18 November 1984 in Brescia) is an Italian footballer who plays for Anconitana.

== Biography ==
Born in Brescia, Lombardy, Borghetti started his professional career at the Province of Brescia team Lumezzane, where he was promoted from its Berretti under-20 team. In July 2005 he joined Serie B club Crotone along with Nicola Ferrari, which he joined in co-ownership deal, from Brescia. In June 2007 Borghetti acquired the remain 50% registration rights. On 2 February 2009 he joined Ternana.

In July 2011 he joined Perugia.

=== International career ===
Borghetti played for Italy U-20 C team in 2004–05 Mirop Cup. He also received a call-up against England C.
