= GSD Rosignano Sei Rose =

Italian football club

Rosignano
- Full name: Gruppo Sportivo Dilettantistico Rosignano Sei Rose
- Founded: 1922
- Ground: Stadio Ernesto Solvay, Rosignano Marittimo, Italy
- Chairman: Silvestro Polzella
- Manager: Stefano Brondi
- League: Eccellenza Tuscany
- 2012–13: Serie D/D, 18th (relegated)
Home colours	Away colours

Gruppo Sportivo Dilettantistico Rosignano Sei Rose (usually referred to as simply Rosignano) is an Italian association football club, based in Rosignano Marittimo, Tuscany. Rosignano currently plays in Eccellenza.

== History ==
The club was founded in 1922 as Gruppo Sportivo Solvay and later changed denomination to Rosignano Solvay.

== Colors and badge ==
The team's colors are white and navy blue.
