= Matías Cuffa =

Argentine footballer

Personal information
- Full name: Matías Claudio Cuffa
- Date of birth: 10 March 1981 (age 45)
- Place of birth: Alta Gracia, Argentina
- Height: 1.82 m (6 ft 0 in)
- Position: Midfielder

Senior career*
Years	Team	Apps	(Gls)
2000–2001	Instituto Córdoba	0	(0)
2001–2002	Monselice	22	(5)
2002–2003	Isernia	26	(3)
2003–2004	Sangiovannese	6	(0)
2004	Tivoli	12	(1)
2004–2005	Gela	29	(4)
2005	Chievo	0	(0)
2005–2006	Pisa	11	(0)
2006	→ Foggia (loan)	4	(0)
2006–2007	Chievo	0	(0)
2006	→ Juve Stabia (loan)	0	(0)
2006–2007	→ Catanzaro (loan)	26	(4)
2007–2009	PortoSummaga	60	(9)
2009–2014	Padova	149	(18)
2014–2015	Matera	4	(1)
2015	San Marino	15	(1)
2015–2017	Viterbese	53	(5)
2017–2018	Rieti	30	(8)
2018–2019	Mantova	28	(1)
- * Club domestic league appearances and goals

Matías Claudio Cuffa (born 10 March 1981) is an Italian Argentine footballer.

== Career ==
Born in Alta Gracia, Córdoba Province, Cuffa started his professional career at Italian Serie D club Isernia. He then spent two seasons in Serie C2 clubs. In July 2005 he was signed by Serie A club Chievo along with Salvatore Giardina but farmed to Pisa in co-ownership deal along with Giardina. In January 2006, he was loaned to fellow Serie C1 club Foggia. In June 2006 Chievo bought back both player. In July 2006 he was loaned to Juve Stabia but later loaned to Catanzaro. In July 2007 he left for PortoSummaga along with Giardina.

In July 2009 he was signed by newly promoted Serie B team Padova in co-ownership deal. In exchange, PortoSummaga signed Davide Bianchi, also in co-ownership deal.

In July 2018 he joined Serie D team Mantova. On 8 August 2019, Cuffa announced his retirement from football.
