= Daniel Bombardieri =

Italian footballer (born 1985)

Personal information
- Full name: Daniel Bombardieri
- Date of birth: 12 May 1985 (age 41)
- Place of birth: Trescore Balneario, Italy
- Height: 1.85 m (6 ft 1 in)
- Position: Defender

Youth career
- 2003?–2005: Atalanta

Senior career*
Years	Team	Apps	(Gls)
2005–2010	AlbinoLeffe	4	(0)
2006–2007	→ Pergocrema (loan)	44	(1)
2008	→ Pergocrema (loan)	13	(0)
2009–2010	→ Pro Sesto (loan)	17	(0)
- * Club domestic league appearances and goals

Daniel Bombardieri (born 12 May 1985) is an Italian footballer. He plays as a defender for AlbinoLeffe, having been loaned out, twice, to Pergocrema.
