= Emanuele Bianchi =

Italian footballer (born 1984)

Personal information
- Date of birth: 10 August 1984 (age 42)
- Place of birth: Camaiore, Italy
- Height: 1.85 m (6 ft 1 in)
- Position: Goalkeeper

Youth career
- Lucchese
- 2003–2004: Sampdoria

Senior career*
Years	Team	Apps	(Gls)
2004–2005	Sampdoria	0	(0)
2005–2009	Perugia	4	(0)
2010	Piacenza	1	(0)
2010	Milazzo	0	(0)
Total		5	(0)

International career
2003–2004	Italy U20	3	(0)
- * Club domestic league appearances and goals

Emanuele Bianchi (born 10 August 1984) is an Italian former footballer who played as a goalkeeper.

== Career ==
Born in Camaiore, the Province of Lucca, Bianchi started his career at the provincial capital Lucca. In 2003, Bianchi left for Sampdoria in co-ownership deal. Bianchi was an overage player for Primavera U20 reserve in the 2004–05 season. In June 2005, Lucchese gave up the remaining 50% registration rights to the Genoese club. Bianchi then left for Serie C1 club Perugia in another co-ownership deal. In June 2006, Sampdoria gave up the rights again. Bianchi played 4 games in his 4 seasons with the Umbria club. Bianchi also returned to the reserve in the first season.

In March 2010, he joined Piacenza. The club had loaned Mario Cassano to Sampdoria (originally went to Reggina to exchange with Christian Puggioni), leaving Fabrizio Capodici, Roberto Maurantonio and Marco Serena were the backup. Bianchi became another backup of Puggioni and played once.

In August 2010, Bianchi left for Milazzo. However, in September he was released.
