= Salvatore Giardina =

Italian footballer

Personal information
- Date of birth: 3 June 1981 (age 45)
- Place of birth: Catania, Italy
- Height: 1.70 m (5 ft 7 in)
- Position: Midfielder

Youth career
- 1998–2001: Acireale

Senior career*
Years	Team	Apps	(Gls)
1997–1998	Belpasso		
1998–2002	Acireale	41	(0)
2002–2003	Rossanese	18	(1)
2003–2005	Gela	60	(2)
2005	Chievo	0	(0)
2005–2006	Pisa	24	(1)
2006–2007	Chievo	0	(0)
2006–2007	→ Sassuolo (loan)	1	(0)
2007–2009	PortoSummaga	48	(3)
2009–2010	Cosenza	9	(0)
2010–2011	Gela	24	(1)
2011–2012	Alessandria	18	(0)
2012–2013	Fondi	7	(0)
2013–2014	Formigine	10	(0)
2015–2016	Scandianese		
- * Club domestic league appearances and goals

Salvatore Giardina (born 3 June 1981) is an Italian former footballer.

== Biography ==
Born in Catania, Sicily, Giardina started his career with Eccellenza Sicily team Belpasso. He then played for Acireale. In 2002, he left for Serie D team Rossanese and in 2003 signed by Serie C2 club Gela. In 2005, he was signed by Serie A club Chievo along with Matías Claudio Cuffa. Chievo farmed both players to Serie C1 club Pisa in co-ownership deal. In June 2006 Chievo bought back both players and loaned Giardina to Serie C1 team Sassuolo. In July 2007, Giardina reunited Cuffa at Serie C2 club PortoSummaga, which Giardina joined the club in co-ownership deal. He follow the team promoted to Prima Divisione in 2008 and the team also bought him outright in June 2008. He was released on 1 July 2009. In August, he left for fellow Prima Divisione team Cosenza. In August 2010, he returned to Gela.
