= Vastese Calcio 1902 =

Italian football club

Vastese
- Full name: Associazione Sportiva Dilettantistica Vastese Calcio 1902
- Nicknames: Aragonesi (The Aragona's People) i Biancorossi (White and reds)
- Founded: 1922; 1981 (refounded); 1995 (refounded); 2012 (refounded)
- Dissolved: 2024
- Ground: Stadio Aragona, Vasto, Italy
- Capacity: 5,700
- Chairman: Raffaele Esposito
- 2022–23: 14th (group F; relegation play-out)
| Home colours | Away colours | Third colours |

Associazione Sportiva Dilettantistica Vastese Calcio 1902 (formerly F.C. Pro Vasto) is an Italian association football club based in Vasto, Abruzzo.

== History ==
Originally known as Vastese, the club was founded on July 4, 1922, and since then spent several seasons in the Italian lower professional tiers of Serie C1 and Serie C2. The club renamed to Pro Vasto in 1952, but was cancelled in 1981 due to financial problems. A minor local team in Promozione league called Società Sportiva Incoronata took its place, and switched denomination to Associazione Calcio Vasto 82 one year later, being promoted to Serie D in 1984 only to be relegated back in 1987. After this relegation, the club changed denomination again, this time to Vastese Calcio, being promoted back to Serie D in 1988, and returning to Serie C2 in 1990 after a successful season in the Italian top amateur level.

Club crest used until 2009

Relegated from Serie C2 in 1994, the club was successively readmitted back into professionalism to fill a league vacancy but the club declared bankruptcy only one year later. In 1997 local Promozione club Vasto Marina changed its denomination to the current one of Football Club Pro Vasto and made two consecutive promotions to return to Serie D in 1999. However, the club was relegated to Eccellenza league in 2000. A new property then acquired the club bringing it back into the Italian fifth tier, one year later and returning into Serie C2 in 2004. F.C. Pro Vasto was then relegated to Serie D in 2007 and played in this league until 2009, when the club won the tournament after a 2–1 win against Tolentino in the last match of the season after winning the last ten matches in a row. The club then took part in the Lega Pro Seconda Divisione in the 2009–10 season.

Club crest until 2012

After bankruptcy in 2010, the club was forced out of business. In 2012 San Paolo Calcio Vasto assumed the name Vastese Calcio 1902 and joined Promozione. It was promoted to Eccellenza Abruzzo in 2013 at the first attempt.

== Colours and badge ==
The club's official colours are red and white.
