= Danilo Russo =

Italian footballer (born 1987)

Personal information
- Date of birth: 8 July 1987 (age 39)
- Place of birth: Pompei, Italy
- Height: 1.86 m (6 ft 1 in)
- Position: Goalkeeper

Youth career
- –2006: Genoa

Senior career*
Years	Team	Apps	(Gls)
2006	Pergocrema	4	(0)
2006–2010	Genoa	0	(0)
2007–2008	→ Viareggio (loan)	33	(0)
2008–2009	→ Pergocrema (loan)	22	(0)
2010–2011	Vicenza	29	(0)
2011–2013	Spezia	41	(0)
2013–2015	Pro Vercelli	77	(0)
2015–2016	Matera	1	(0)
2016–2017	Juve Stabia	2	(0)
2017–2018	Venezia	1	(0)
2018–2019	Casertana	12	(0)
2019–2023	Juve Stabia	32	(0)
2023–2025	Giugliano	59	(0)
2025–2026	Benevento	0	(0)

International career
2003	Italy U16	3	(0)
2003–2004	Italy U17	5	(0)
2005	Italy U20	1	(0)
- * Club domestic league appearances and goals as of 26 April 2026

Danilo Russo (born 8 July 1987) is an Italian professional footballer who plays as a goalkeeper.

== Club career ==
=== Youth and loan career ===
Born in Pompei, the Province of Naples, Russo started his career at Genoa. In January 2006 he left for Serie C2 side Pergocrema. He was the backup of Stefano Belussi. In 2006, he was re-signed by Serie B club Genoa for €180,000. Due to Article 33 of NOIF (Norme organizzative interne of FIGC) restricted "young professional" and trainee to sign a contract for more than 3 years, Russo signed a contract until 30 June 2009. He was the backup of Rubinho, Nicola Barasso and Alessio Scarpi; was award no.57 shirt. He also played for the Primavera under-20 team.

In 2007–08 season, he left for Serie C2 side Viareggio on loan, ahead Andrea Carpita as first choice. In 2008–09 season, he left for Lega Pro Prima Divisione side Pergocrema again (along with Paolo Facchinetti and Michele Tarallo), but now as first choice ahead Pierluigi Brivio. Russo also extended his contract twice with Genoa to 30 June 2010 and 2013 during the 2008–09 season, effective in the first half and second half of the club's 2009 financial year. Despite Russo making 33 appearances for Viareggio, he became "professional" and eligible to sign a contract for a maximum of 5-year, at first he only added a year to his contract and the performance at Pergocrema made him earned 3 more year to his contract. The amortization cost for his contract value was lowered from €60,000 per season from 2006 to 2007 & 2007–08 season to €40,000 in 2008–09 and €2,500 in the first half of 2009–10. However, it was counterbalanced by the wages of his professional contract.

=== Return to Genoa ===
In the 2009–10 season, he returned to Genoa in Serie A as third keeper behind Marco Amelia and Alessio Scarpi, as youth product Eugenio Lamanna left the club. He took the No. 1 shirt from Lamanna.

=== Vicenza ===
In January 2010, he left for Vicenza in co-ownership deal in exchanged with Alberto Frison left for Genoa on loan. Half of Russo's registration rights was tagged for a peppercorn fee of €500 only, which Genoa had to write-down €16,500. (Residual value €17,500 minus selling price €1,000) He took no.1 shirt from Frison but as Marco Fortin's backup, ahead Cristian Cicioni and José Rocchi. In 2010–11 Serie B, he played 29 Serie B games as Fortin retired, while Frison became his understudy.

=== Spezia ===
In June 2011 Genoa bought back Russo for a peppercorn fee of €500 and on 6 July 2011 he was transferred to Spezia. He won Supercoppa di Lega di Prima Divisione (the grand champion of third division) as well as Coppa Italia Lega Pro (Italian Lega Pro Cup). The club also promoted back to Serie B.

=== Pro Vercelli ===
On 12 August 2013, he joined Pro Vercelli in co-ownership deal in exchanged with Alex Valentini left for Spezia also in co-ownership.

=== Venezia ===
In mid-2017 Russo left for Venezia.

=== Return to Juve Stabia ===
On 24 July 2019, he returned to Juve Stabia, after it has been promoted to Serie B.

=== Giugliano ===
On 12 July 2023, Russo signed a two-year contract with Giugliano.

== International career ==
He capped 3 times for Italy U17 at 2004 UEFA European Under-17 Football Championship qualification, and another 3 times as an unused bench player for Andrea Consigli. He was never called up to the U19 team as the coach preferred Consigli, Giacomo Bindi, Salvatore Sirigu and Lorenzo Farinelli. After the U19 failed to qualify for the second qualifying round of 2006 UEFA European Under-19 Football Championship, Russo was promoted to the Italy U20 team, the feeder team of the U21 team, along with Bindi (capped twice) and Consigli (capped once), for the 2005-06 Four Nations Tournament. He played once out of a possible 5 with his last match (the final) played by Daniele Padelli.

Due to club performance, he did not receive an U21 call-up, but Consigli and Sirigu did.

== Honours ==
Spezia

- Supercoppa di Lega di Prima Divisione: 2012
- Lega Pro Prima Divisione: 2012
- Coppa Italia Lega Pro: 2012
