= 2019–20 RCD Mallorca season =

Mallorca
2019–20 season
- President: Andy Kohlberg
- Head coach: Vicente Moreno
- Stadium: Estadi de Son Moix
- La Liga: 19th (relegated)
- Copa del Rey: Round of 32
- Top goalscorer: League: Ante Budimir (13); All: Ante Budimir (13)
- Highest home attendance: 20,275 vs Real Madrid (19 October 2019)
- Lowest home attendance: 8,348 vs Villarreal (10 November 2019)
- Average home league attendance: 10,836
- Biggest win: Mallorca 5–1 Celta
- Biggest defeat: Valladolid 3–0 Mallorca
Home colours	Away colours	Third colours

The 2019–20 season was Real Club Deportivo Mallorca's 86th season in existence and the club's first season back in the top flight of Spanish football. In addition to the domestic league, Mallorca participated in this season's edition of the Copa del Rey. The season was slated to cover a period from 1 July 2019 to 30 June 2020. It was extended extraordinarily beyond 30 June due to the COVID-19 pandemic in Spain.

== Players ==
=== First-team squad ===
As of 25 February 2020

Note: Flags indicate national team as defined under FIFA eligibility rules; some limited exceptions apply. Players may hold more than one non-FIFA nationality.

No.	Pos.	Nation	Player
1	GK	ESP	Manolo Reina (vice-captain)
2	DF	ESP	Joan Sastre
3	DF	GHA	Lumor Agbenyenu (on loan from Sporting CP)
4	MF	ESP	Josep Señé
5	DF	ESP	Xisco Campos (captain)
6	MF	ESP	Marc Pedraza
7	MF	ESP	Alejandro Pozo (on loan from Sevilla)
8	MF	ESP	Salva Sevilla
9	FW	ESP	Abdón
10	MF	KOR	Ki Sung-yueng
11	FW	CIV	Lago Junior
12	MF	GHA	Iddrisu Baba
13	GK	ESP	Fabri (on loan from Fulham)
14	MF	ESP	Dani Rodríguez

No.	Pos.	Nation	Player
15	DF	ESP	Fran Gámez
16	FW	FRA	Yannis Salibur
17	FW	MKD	Aleksandar Trajkovski
18	DF	GRE	Leonardo Koutris (on loan from Olympiacos)
19	FW	ARG	Pablo Chavarría
20	DF	SRB	Aleksandar Sedlar
21	DF	ESP	Antonio Raíllo (3rd captain)
22	FW	CRO	Ante Budimir
23	MF	ESP	Aleix Febas
24	DF	SVK	Martin Valjent
25	GK	ESP	Miquel Parera
26	MF	JPN	Takefusa Kubo (on loan from Real Madrid)
29	FW	COL	Cucho Hernández (on loan from Watford)

=== Out of squad ===
Note: Flags indicate national team as defined under FIFA eligibility rules; some limited exceptions apply. Players may hold more than one non-FIFA nationality.

No.	Pos.	Nation	Player
—	DF	GHA	Baba Rahman (on loan from Chelsea)

=== Reserve team ===
Note: Flags indicate national team as defined under FIFA eligibility rules; some limited exceptions apply. Players may hold more than one non-FIFA nationality.

No.	Pos.	Nation	Player
27	GK	ESP	Chus Ruiz
41	MF	ARG	Luka Romero

=== Out on loan ===
Note: Flags indicate national team as defined under FIFA eligibility rules; some limited exceptions apply. Players may hold more than one non-FIFA nationality.

No.	Pos.	Nation	Player
—	DF	FRA	Pierre Cornud (at Ibiza until 30 June 2020)
—	DF	ARG	Franco Russo (at Ponferradina until 30 June 2020)
—	MF	FRA	Enzo Lombardo (at Racing Santander until 30 June 2020)
—	MF	PER	Bryan Reyna (at Las Rozas until 30 June 2020)
—	MF	ESP	Iñigo Ruiz de Galarreta (at Las Palmas until 30 June 2020)
—	MF	ESP	Antonio Sánchez (at Mirandés until 30 June 2020)
—	MF	ESP	Pablo Valcarce (at Ponferradina until 30 June 2020)

No.	Pos.	Nation	Player
—	FW	ESP	Sergio Buenacasa (at Málaga until 30 June 2020)
—	FW	SRB	Igor Zlatanović (at Numancia until 30 June 2020)
—	FW	ESP	Álex López (at Extremadura until 30 June 2020)
—	FW	ESP	Álex Alegría (at Extremadura until 30 June 2020)
—	FW	ESP	Carlos Castro (at Lugo until 30 June 2020)
—	FW	ESP	Moyita (at Rayo Majadahonda until 30 June 2020)
—	FW	ESP	Stoichkov (at Alcorcón until 30 June 2020)

== Transfers ==
=== In ===
Date	Player	From	Type	Fee	Ref
30 June 2019	(Spain) Carlos Castro	Elche	Loan return		
30 June 2019	(France) Pierre Cornud	Linense	Loan return		
30 June 2019	(Spain) Moyita	Cartagena	Loan return		
30 June 2019	(Peru) Bryan Reyna	Alcoyano	Loan return		
30 June 2019	(Spain) Pol Roigé	Hércules	Loan return		
1 July 2019	(Croatia) Ante Budimir	(Italy) Crotone	Buyout clause	€2.2M	
1 July 2019	(Slovenia) Martin Valjent	(Italy) Chievo	Buyout clause	€1.5M	
2 July 2019	(Spain) Álex Alegría	Real Betis	Transfer	Free	
5 July 2019	(Argentina) Pablo Chavarría	(France) Reims	Transfer	Free	
10 July 2019	(Spain) Josep Señé	Cultural Leonesa	Transfer	Free	
12 July 2019	(Spain) Aleix Febas	Real Madrid Castilla	Transfer	Free	
12 July 2019	(Serbia) Aleksandar Sedlar	(Poland) Piast Gliwice	Transfer	Free	
31 July 2019	(Ghana) Lumor Agbenyenu	(Portugal) Sporting CP	Loan		
31 July 2019	(Serbia) Igor Zlatanović	(Serbia) Radnik Surdulica	Transfer	€1.3M	
7 August 2019	(North Macedonia) Aleksandar Trajkovski	(Italy) Palermo	Transfer	Free	
22 August 2019	(Japan) Takefusa Kubo	Real Madrid Castilla	Loan		
22 August 2019	(France) Yannis Salibur	(France) Guingamp	Transfer	€2M	
26 August 2019	(Colombia) Cucho Hernández	(England) Watford	Loan		
2 September 2019	(Spain) Fabri	(England) Fulham	Loan		
2 September 2019	(Ghana) Baba Rahman	(England) Chelsea	Loan		
2 September 2019	(Spain) Iñigo Ruiz de Galarreta	Las Palmas	Transfer	Undisclosed	

=== Out ===
Date	Player	To	Type	Fee	Ref
30 June 2019	(Ecuador) Pervis Estupiñán	(England) Watford	Loan return		
30 June 2019	(Spain) Salva Ruiz	Valencia	Loan return		
30 June 2019	(Serbia) Nikola Stojiljković	(Portugal) Braga	Loan return		
30 June 2019	(Argentina) Leonardo Suárez	Villarreal	Loan return		
6 July 2019	(Spain) Leandro Montagud	Cultural Leonesa	Transfer	Free	
12 July 2019	(Spain) Sergio Buenacasa	Ponferradina	Loan		
12 July 2019	(Argentina) Franco Russo	Ponferradina	Loan		
14 July 2019	(Spain) Álvaro Bustos	Pontevedra	Buyout clause	Undisclosed	
16 July 2019	(Spain) Pol Roigé	(Sweden) GIF Sundsvall	Transfer	Free	
17 July 2019	(Spain) Carlos Castro	Lugo	Loan		
19 July 2019	(Spain) Pablo Valcarce	Ponferradina	Loan		
20 July 2019	(Spain) Stoichkov	Alcorcón	Loan		
22 July 2019	(Argentina) Alejandro Faurlín	Marbella	Contract termination		
26 July 2019	(Spain) Fernando Cano	Lleida Esportiu	Contract termination		
30 July 2019	(Peru) Bryan Reyna	Barakaldo	Loan		
30 July 2019	(Spain) Álex López	Extremadura	Loan		
16 August 2019	(Serbia) Igor Zlatanović	Numancia	Loan		
30 August 2019	(Spain) Antonio Sánchez	Mirandés	Loan		
31 August 2019	(France) Pierre Cornud	Oviedo B	Loan		
2 September 2019	(Spain) Moyita	Rayo Majadahonda	Loan		
2 September 2019	(Spain) Iñigo Ruiz de Galarreta	Las Palmas	Loan		

== Pre-season and friendlies ==
Win Draw Loss

21 July 2019 Friendly	Mallorca	4–0	Felanitx	Sa Pobla, Spain
20:00 CEST (UTC+2)				Stadium: Estadio Municipal de Sa Pobla

24 July 2019 Friendly	Mallorca	3–0	Platges de Calvià	Palma, Spain
19:15 CEST (UTC+2)				Stadium: Estadi Son Bibiloni

28 July 2019 Friendly	Mallorca	1–1	Poblense	Palma, Spain
20:00 CEST (UTC+2)				Stadium: Estadi Son Bibiloni

1 August 2019 Friendly	Málaga	0–2	Mallorca	San Pedro de Alcántara, Spain
19:30 CEST (UTC+2)		Report	Junior 46'; Budimir 90'	Stadium: Marbella Football Center

4 August 2019 Friendly	Mallorca	2–2	Valladolid	Marbella, Spain
19:00 CEST (UTC+2)	Budimir 44'; Junior 71' (pen.)		Alende 11'; Guardiola 26'	Stadium: Campo La Quinta

7 August 2019 Friendly	Mallorca	0–0	Getafe	San Pedro de Alcántara, Spain
19:30 CEST (UTC+2)				Stadium: Marbella Football Center

10 August 2019 Friendly	Mallorca	1–2	Levante	Palma, Spain
21:00 CEST (UTC+2)	Budimir 5'	Report	León 50'; Mayoral 57'	Stadium: Estadi de Son Moix; Referee: Guillermo Cuadra Fernández

5 September 2019 Friendly	Mallorca	0–2	Poblense	Sa Pobla, Spain
19:00 CEST (UTC+2)		Report	Vidal 34'; Oller 56' (pen.)	Stadium: Estadio Municipal de Sa Pobla

== Competitions ==
=== Overview ===
Competition	First match	Last match	Starting round	Final position	Record							
Competition	First match	Last match	Starting round	Final position	Pld	W	D	L	GF	GA	GD	Win %
La Liga	17 August 2019	19 July 2020	Matchday 1	19th	38	9	6	23	40	65	−25	23.68
Copa del Rey	18 December 2019	21 January 2020	First round	Round of 32	3	2	0	1	3	3	+0	66.67
Total					41	11	6	24	43	68	−25	26.83

Last updated: 19 July 2020
Source: Soccerway

=== La Liga ===
==== League table ====
Pos	Team	Pld	W	D	L	GF	GA	GD	Pts	Qualification or relegation
16	Alavés	38	10	9	19	34	59	−25	39	
17	Celta Vigo	38	7	16	15	37	49	−12	37	
18	Leganés (R)	38	8	12	18	30	51	−21	36	Relegation to Segunda División
19	Mallorca (R)	38	9	6	23	40	65	−25	33	Relegation to Segunda División
20	Espanyol (R)	38	5	10	23	27	58	−31	25	Relegation to Segunda División

Source: La Liga, Soccerway
Rules for classification: 1) Points; 2) Head-to-head points; 3) Head-to-head goal difference; 4) Goal difference; 5) Goals scored; 6) Fair-play points (Note: Head-to-head record is used only after all the matches between the teams in question have been played)
(R) Relegated

==== Results summary ====
Overall								Home						Away					
Pld	W	D	L	GF	GA	GD	Pts	W	D	L	GF	GA	GD	W	D	L	GF	GA	GD
38	9	6	23	40	65	−25	33	8	3	8	25	22	+3	1	3	15	15	43	−28

Last updated: 19 July 2020.
Source: La Liga

==== Results by round ====
Round	1	2	3	4	5	6	7	8	9	10	11	12	13	14	15	16	17	18	19	20	21	22	23	24	25	26	27	28	29	30	31	32	33	34	35	36	37	38
Ground	H	H	A	H	A	H	A	H	H	A	H	A	H	A	H	A	A	H	A	H	A	H	A	H	A	H	A	H	A	H	A	A	H	A	H	A	H	A
Result	W	L	L	D	L	L	L	W	W	L	D	L	W	L	L	L	D	L	L	W	L	L	L	W	D	L	W	L	L	D	L	L	W	L	W	L	L	D
Position	4	11	14	14	17	19	19	18	15	15	17	17	16	17	17	17	17	17	18	17	17	17	18	18	18	18	18	18	18	18	18	18	18	18	18	19	19	19

Updated to match(es) played on 19 July 2020. Source: La Liga
A = Away; H = Home; W = Win; D = Draw; L = Loss

==== Matches ====
The La Liga schedule was announced on 4 July 2019.

17 August 2019 1	Mallorca	2–1	Eibar	Palma
20:00 CEST (UTC+2)	Rodríguez 4'; Sastre (yellow card) 14'; Oliveira 75' (o.g.); Sevilla (yellow card) 90+5'	Report	Oliveira 57'; Álvarez (yellow card) 72'; Tejero (yellow card) 87'; Orellana (yellow card) 88'	Stadium: Estadi de Son Moix; Attendance: 14,517; Referee: Mario Melero López

25 August 2019 2	Mallorca	0–1	Real Sociedad	Palma
17:00 CEST (UTC+2)	Raíllo (yellow card) 78'	Report	Merino (yellow card) 19'; Le Normand (yellow card) 57'; Ødegaard 83'	Stadium: Estadi de Son Moix; Attendance: 17,257; Referee: Valentín Pizarro Gómez

1 September 2019 3	Valencia	2–0	Mallorca	Valencia
17:00 CEST (UTC+2)	Parejo 43' (pen.), 57' (pen.)	Report	Junior (yellow card) 53'	Stadium: Mestalla; Attendance: 40,544; Referee: Javier Alberola Rojas

13 September 2019 4	Mallorca	0–0	Athletic Bilbao	Palma
21:00 CEST (UTC+2)	Rodríguez (yellow card) 1'; Rahman (yellow card) 65'; Abdón (yellow card) 76'; Sevilla (yellow card) 90+7'	Report	D. García (yellow card) 30'; Martínez (yellow card) 43'; López (yellow card) 46'	Stadium: Estadi de Son Moix; Attendance: 16,121; Referee: Pablo González Fuertes

22 September 2019 5	Getafe	4–2	Mallorca	Getafe
12:00 CEST (UTC+2)	Baba 7' (o.g.); Molina 33' (pen.); Mata (yellow card) 45+2'; Cabrera (yellow card) 48'; Suárez (yellow card) 59'; Jason (yellow card) 61'; Nyom 63'; Ángel 84'	Report	Sastre (yellow card) 32'; Fabri (yellow card) 60'; Budimir 70', 77'; Febas (yellow card) 79'; Lumor (yellow card) 86'; Baba (yellow card) 87'	Stadium: Coliseum Alfonso Pérez; Attendance: 11,338; Referee: Santiago Jaime Latre

25 September 2019 6	Mallorca	0–2	Atlético Madrid	Palma
19:00 CEST (UTC+2)	Baba (yellow card) 5'; Budimir (yellow card) 7'; Campos (yellow card) 77'	Report	Savić (yellow card) 13'; Costa 26'; Felipe (yellow card) 55'; Félix 65'; Morata (yellow card) 77' (yellow-red card) 78'; Correa (yellow card) 86'	Stadium: Estadi de Son Moix; Attendance: 19,348; Referee: Alejandro Hernández Hernández

29 September 2019 7	Alavés	2–0	Mallorca	Vitoria-Gasteiz
16:00 CEST (UTC+2)	Wakaso (yellow card) 27'; Navarro (yellow card) 50'; Pérez 76' (pen.); Joselu 86'	Report	Junior (yellow card) 33'; Sevilla (yellow card) 78'; Valjent (yellow card) 79'	Stadium: Mendizorrotza; Attendance: 12,834; Referee: Carlos del Cerro Grande

6 October 2019 8	Mallorca	2–0	Espanyol	Palma
12:00 CEST (UTC+2)	Budimir 37'; Sevilla (yellow card) 64', (goal) 73'	Report	Sánchez (yellow card) 4'; López (yellow card) 61'; Naldo (yellow card) 62'	Stadium: Estadi de Son Moix; Attendance: 14,426; Referee: Ricardo de Burgos Bengoetxea

19 October 2019 9	Mallorca	1–0	Real Madrid	Palma
21:00 CEST (UTC+2)	Junior 7'; Sastre (yellow card) 30'; Baba (yellow card) 90+5'	Report	Odriozola (yellow card) 19' (yellow-red card) 74'	Stadium: Estadi de Son Moix; Attendance: 20,275; Referee: Javier Alberola Rojas

26 October 2019 10	Leganés	1–0	Mallorca	Leganés
16:00 CEST (UTC+2)	Braithwaite 31'; Siovas (yellow card) 56'; Rosales (yellow card) 71'; Rivera (yellow card) 77'; Cuéllar (yellow card) 90+4'	Report	Budimir (yellow card) 47'	Stadium: Estadio Municipal de Butarque; Attendance: 10,058; Referee: Eduardo Prieto Iglesias

31 October 2019 11	Mallorca	2–2	Osasuna	Palma
19:00 CET (UTC+1)	Junior 21' (pen.); Baba (yellow card) 55'; Sevilla 73' (pen.)	Report	Brandon (yellow card) 15'; Estupiñán (yellow card) 34'; D. García (yellow card) 53'; Aridane (yellow card) 63'; Cardona 69'; Roncaglia (yellow card) 75'; R. García 77'	Stadium: Estadi de Son Moix; Attendance: 12,641; Referee: Adrián Cordero Vega

3 November 2019 12	Valladolid	3–0	Mallorca	Valladolid
12:00 CET (UTC+1)	Joaquín 40', (yellow card) 63'; Míchel (yellow card) 45+1'; Ünal 50' (pen.), (yellow card) 77'; Sandro (yellow card) 66', (goal) 90+4'; Salisu (yellow card) 86'; Alcaraz (yellow card) 87'	Report	Sevilla (yellow card) 55'; Valjent (yellow card) 77'; Sastre (yellow card) 89'; Febas (yellow card) 90+3'	Stadium: José Zorrilla; Attendance: 18,419; Referee: David Medié Jiménez

10 November 2019 13	Mallorca	3–1	Villarreal	Palma
12:00 CET (UTC+1)	Junior 13' (pen.); Rodríguez 23' (pen.), (yellow card) 55'; Kubo 53'; Febas (yellow card) 90+4'	Report	Asenjo (yellow card) 22'; Cazorla 49' (pen.); Peña (yellow card) 60'; Albiol (yellow card) 77'	Stadium: Estadi de Son Moix; Attendance: 8,348; Referee: Carlos del Cerro Grande

22 November 2019 14	Levante	2–1	Mallorca	Valencia
21:00 CET (UTC+1)	Roger 52'; Campaña (yellow card) 60' (yellow-red card) 86'; Rochina 73'	Report	Budimir (yellow card) 56'; Rodríguez 65'	Stadium: Estadi Ciutat de València; Attendance: 15,110; Referee: Valentín Pizarro Gómez

30 November 2019 15	Mallorca	1–2	Real Betis	Palma
18:30 CET (UTC+1)	Lumor (yellow card) 45' (yellow-red card) 90+1'; Kubo (yellow card) 46'; Junior 55' (pen.)	Report	Joaquín 7' (pen.); Guardado (yellow card) 27'; Fekir 33'; Emerson (yellow card) 45+1'; Loren (yellow card) 53'; Mandi (yellow card) 67'	Stadium: Estadi de Son Moix; Attendance: 16,051; Referee: Juan Martínez Munuera

7 December 2019 16	Barcelona	5–2	Mallorca	Barcelona
21:00 CET (UTC+1)	Griezmann 7'; Roberto (yellow card) 8'; Messi 17', 41', 83'; Suárez 43'; Piqué (yellow card) 67'; Vidal (yellow card) 79'	Report	Budimir 35', 64'	Stadium: Camp Nou; Attendance: 71,072; Referee: José Luis Munuera Montero

15 December 2019 17	Celta Vigo	2–2	Mallorca	Vigo
14:00 CET (UTC+1)	Rafinha 20'; Aidoo (yellow card) 33'; Aspas 49' (pen.); Araujo (yellow card) 57'; Mina (yellow card) 74'	Report	Sevilla 33' (pen.); Budimir (yellow card) 45+4', (goal) 83'; Raíllo (yellow card) 65' (yellow-red card) 78'; Hernández (yellow card) 71'; Reina (yellow card) 79'	Stadium: Abanca-Balaídos; Attendance: 13,247; Referee: Ricardo de Burgos Bengoetxea

21 December 2019 18	Mallorca	0–2	Sevilla	Palma
13:00 CET (UTC+1)	Gámez (yellow card) 37'; Budimir (yellow card) 45+4'; Baba (yellow card) 62'; Valjent (yellow card) 64'; Sedlar (yellow card) 84'	Report	Navas (yellow card) 15'; Diego Carlos 20'; Fernando (yellow card) 33'; Banega 63' (pen.); Reguilón (yellow card) 84'	Stadium: Estadi de Son Moix; Attendance: 13,810; Referee: Jesús Gil Manzano

5 January 2020 19	Granada	1–0	Mallorca	Granada
12:00 CET (UTC+1)	Montoro 24', (yellow card) 40'; Díaz (yellow card) 44'; Eteki (yellow card) 53'; Soldado (yellow card) 78'; Azeez (yellow card) 89'	Report	Raíllo (yellow card) 90+1'	Stadium: Nuevo Estadio de Los Cármenes; Attendance: 16,395; Referee: César Soto Grado

19 January 2020 20	Mallorca	4–1	Valencia	Palma
12:00 CET (UTC+1)	Raíllo 7', (yellow card) 38'; Budimir 22', 41'; Sevilla (yellow card) 55'; Reina (yellow card) 60'; Rodríguez 79'; Kubo (yellow card) 81'	Report	Parejo (yellow card) 6' (yellow-red card) 51'; Coquelin (yellow card) 12'; Torres 82', (yellow card) 87'	Stadium: Estadi de Son Moix; Attendance: 9,856; Referee: Mario Melero López

26 January 2020 21	Real Sociedad	3–0	Mallorca	San Sebastián
18:30 CET (UTC+1)	Isak 46'; Barrenetxea 58'; Portu 81'	Report	Valjent (yellow card) 64'; Lumor (yellow card) 90+3'	Stadium: Anoeta; Attendance: 29,785; Referee: Santiago Jaime Latre

1 February 2020 22	Mallorca	0–1	Valladolid	Palma
18:30 CET (UTC+1)	Budimir (yellow card) 17'; Rodríguez (yellow card) 25'; Reina (yellow card) 29'; Hernández (yellow card) 67'	Report	Ünal 56'; Toni (yellow card) 66'	Stadium: Estadi de Son Moix; Attendance: 13,891; Referee: David Medié Jiménez

9 February 2020 23	Espanyol	1–0	Mallorca	Cornellà de Llobregat
12:00 CET (UTC+1)	Prieto (yellow card) 6'; Vilà (yellow card) 39'; Di. López (yellow card) 54'; De Tomás 58'; Cabrera (yellow card) 70'; Sánchez (yellow card) 80'; Gómez (yellow card) 90+4'	Report	Sevilla (yellow card) 61'; Lumor (yellow card) 87'	Stadium: RCDE Stadium; Attendance: 28,823; Referee: Antonio Mateu Lahoz

15 February 2020 24	Mallorca	1–0	Alavés	Palma
13:00 CET (UTC+1)	Hernández 63'	Report	Magallán (yellow card) 40'; Laguardia (yellow card) 71'	Stadium: Estadi de Son Moix; Attendance: 12,329; Referee: Valentín Pizarro Gómez

21 February 2020 25	Real Betis	3–3	Mallorca	Seville
21:00 CET (UTC+1)	Canales 19' (pen.); Fekir 35' (pen.); Joaquín 48'; Bartra (yellow card) 68'; Aleñá (yellow card) 90+4'	Report	Hernández 16'; Budimir 27'; Gámez (yellow card) 58'; Kubo 70'	Stadium: Benito Villamarín; Attendance: 47,231; Referee: Jesús Gil Manzano

1 March 2020 26	Mallorca	0–1	Getafe	Palma
18:30 CET (UTC+1)	Chavarría (yellow card) 78'; Hernández (yellow card) 90'; Sevilla (yellow card) 90' (yellow-red card) 90+1'	Report	Ángel (yellow card) 30'; Etxeita (yellow card) 59'; Maksimović 67'; Deyverson (yellow card) 81'; Etebo (yellow card) 82'; Olivera (yellow card) 87'	Stadium: Estadi de Son Moix; Attendance: 14,022; Referee: Mario Melero López

7 March 2020 27	Eibar	1–2	Mallorca	Eibar
13:00 CET (UTC+1)	Oliveira (yellow card) 40'; Cote (yellow card) 72'; Charles (yellow card) 86'; Bigas 90+2'; Enrich (yellow card) 90+3'; Yoel (yellow card) 90+4'	Report	Valjent (yellow card) 23'; Rodríguez 42', (yellow card) 66'; Kubo 78'; Reina (yellow card) 90+3'	Stadium: Ipurua Municipal Stadium; Attendance: 6,110; Referee: Xavier Estrada Fernández

13 June 2020 28	Mallorca	0–4	Barcelona	Palma
22:00 CEST (UTC+2)	Rodríguez (yellow card) 86'	Report	Vidal 2', (yellow card) 42'; Braithwaite 37'; Alba (yellow card) 73', (goal) 79'; Messi 90+3'	Stadium: Estadi de Son Moix; Attendance: 0 Referee: Carlos del Cerro Grande
Note: The match was originally scheduled for 14 March, but was postponed due to the COVID-19 pandemic, and rescheduled to 13 June. It was played behind closed doors.

16 June 2020 29	Villarreal	1–0	Mallorca	Villarreal
19:30 CEST (UTC+2)	Bacca 16'; Moreno (yellow card) 18'; Albiol (yellow card) 45'; Torres (yellow card) 45+2'	Report	Sedlar (yellow card) 5'; Gámez (yellow card) 27'; Febas (yellow card) 62'; Raíllo (yellow card) 65'	Stadium: Estadio de la Cerámica; Attendance: 0 Referee: Xavier Estrada Fernández
Note: The match was originally scheduled for 22 March, but was postponed due to the COVID-19 pandemic, and rescheduled to 16 June. It was played behind closed doors.

19 June 2020 30	Mallorca	1–1	Leganés	Palma
19:30 CEST (UTC+2)	Sevilla 9'; Rodríguez (yellow card) 49'; Budimir (yellow card) 59'; Junior (yellow card) 79'	Report	Carrillo (yellow card) 2'; Amadou (yellow card) 35'; Rodrigues (yellow card) 48'; Mesa (yellow card) 67'; Óscar (yellow card) 76', (goal) 87'; Rosales (yellow card) 90+3'	Stadium: Estadi de Son Moix; Attendance: 0 Referee: Antonio Mateu Lahoz
Note: The match was originally scheduled for 5 April, but was postponed due to the COVID-19 pandemic, and rescheduled to 19 June. It was played behind closed doors.

24 June 2020 31	Real Madrid	2–0	Mallorca	Madrid
22:00 CEST (UTC+2)	Vinícius 19'; Ramos (yellow card) 35', (goal) 56'; Modrić (yellow card) 46'; Mendy (yellow card) 80'; Kroos (yellow card) 87'	Report	Budimir (yellow card) 8'	Stadium: Alfredo di Stéfano; Attendance: 0 Referee: Mario Melero López
Note: The match was originally scheduled for 12 April, but was postponed due to the COVID-19 pandemic, and rescheduled to 24 June. It was played behind closed doors.

27 June 2020 32	Athletic Bilbao	3–1	Mallorca	Bilbao
14:00 CEST (UTC+2)	R. García 16' (pen.), (yellow card) 76'; Sancet 24'; Villalibre 90'	Report	Budimir (yellow card) 66', (goal) 70' (pen.); Raíllo (yellow card) 82'	Stadium: San Mamés Stadium; Attendance: 0 Referee: Pablo González Fuertes
Note: The match was originally scheduled for 22 April, but was postponed due to the COVID-19 pandemic, and rescheduled to 27 June. It was played behind closed doors.

30 June 2020 33	Mallorca	5–1	Celta Vigo	Palma
19:30 CEST (UTC+2)	Budimir 13' (pen.), 52', (yellow card) 54'; Hernández 27'; Pozo 40'; Valjent (yellow card) 48'; Sevilla 60'; Gámez (yellow card) 89'	Report	Aspas 50' (pen.); Fernández (yellow card) 75'; Murillo (yellow card) 80'	Stadium: Estadi de Son Moix; Attendance: 0 Referee: Ricardo de Burgos Bengoetxea
Note: The match was originally scheduled for 26 April, but was postponed due to the COVID-19 pandemic, and rescheduled to 30 June. It was played behind closed doors.

3 July 2020 34	Atlético Madrid	3–0	Mallorca	Madrid
22:00 CEST (UTC+2)	Morata 29' (pen.), 45+4'; Saúl (yellow card) 44'; Costa (yellow card) 68'; Koke 79'	Report	Sedlar (yellow card) 26'	Stadium: Wanda Metropolitano; Attendance: 0 Referee: Javier Alberola Rojas
Note: The match was originally scheduled for 3 May, but was postponed due to the COVID-19 pandemic, and rescheduled to 3 July. It was played behind closed doors.

9 July 2020 35	Mallorca	2–0	Levante	Palma
19:30 CEST (UTC+2)	Rodríguez (yellow card) 21'; Hernández 40'; Raíllo (yellow card) 51'; Kubo (yellow card) 61', (goal) 84'	Report	Hernâni (yellow card) 90'	Stadium: Estadi de Son Moix; Attendance: 0 Referee: César Soto Grado
Note: The match was originally scheduled for 10 May, but was postponed due to the COVID-19 pandemic, and rescheduled to 9 July. It was played behind closed doors.

12 July 2020 36	Sevilla	2–0	Mallorca	Seville
22:00 CEST (UTC+2)	Ocampos 41' (pen.); Jordán (yellow card) 44'; Bounou (yellow card) 65'; En-Nesyri (yellow card) 83', (goal) 84'	Report	Budimir (yellow card) 36'; Gámez (yellow card) 53'	Stadium: Ramón Sánchez Pizjuán; Attendance: 0 Referee: Adrián Cordero Vega
Note: The match was originally scheduled for 13 May, but was postponed due to the COVID-19 pandemic, and rescheduled to 12 July. It was played behind closed doors.

16 July 2020 37	Mallorca	1–2	Granada	Palma
21:00 CEST (UTC+2)	Budimir (yellow card) 2'; Hernández 20', (yellow card) 84' (yellow-red card) 90+7'; Sevilla (yellow card) 28'; Baba (yellow card) 33'; Valjent (yellow card) 60'; Kubo (yellow card) 67'; Sedlar (red card) 80'	Report	Herrera (yellow card) 21'; Montoro (yellow card) 44'; Díaz 45+1'; Fernández 69'; Machís (yellow card) 86'; Puertas (yellow card) 90'; Silva (yellow card) 90+6'	Stadium: El Sadar; Attendance: 0 Referee: Xavier Estrada Fernández
Note: The match was originally scheduled for 17 May, but was postponed due to the COVID-19 pandemic, and rescheduled to 16 July. It was played behind closed doors.

19 July 2020 38	Osasuna	2–2	Mallorca	Pamplona
21:00 CEST (UTC+2)	Lato (yellow card) 13'; Oier (yellow card) 21'; Adrián 21'; Pérez 68'	Report	Agbenyenu 45+1'; Budimir 65'	Stadium: El Sadar; Attendance: 0 Referee: Antonio Mateu Lahoz
Note: The match was originally scheduled for 24 May, but was postponed due to the COVID-19 pandemic, and rescheduled to 19 July. It was played behind closed doors.

=== Copa del Rey ===
18 December 2019 First round	El Álamo	0–1	Mallorca	El Álamo
18:00 CET (UTC+1)		Report	Trajkovski (yellow card) 81'; Raíllo (yellow card) 85'; Alegría (yellow card) 90+1'; Contreras 90+3' (o.g.)	Stadium: Facundo Rivas; Attendance: 2,200; Referee: David Medié Jiménez

11 January 2020 Second round	Zamora	0–1	Mallorca	Zamora
12:00 CET (UTC+1)	Coque (yellow card) 53'	Report	Febas 26'; Sevilla (yellow card) 58'	Stadium: Ruta de la Plata; Attendance: 3,306; Referee: Valentín Pizarro Gómez

21 January 2020 Round of 32	Zaragoza	3–1	Mallorca	Zaragoza
19:00 CET (UTC+1)	Kagawa (yellow card) 8'; Grippo (yellow card) 8'; Atienza (yellow card) 9'; Ros (yellow card) 32'; Blanco 48'; Puado 54'; Linares 75'	Report	Sastre (yellow card) 27'; Pedraza (yellow card) 56'; Febas (yellow card) 62', (goal) 85'; Sedlar (yellow card) 68'; Alegría (yellow card) 89'	Stadium: La Romareda; Attendance: 6,000; Referee: Antonio Mateu Lahoz

== Statistics ==
=== Appearances and goals ===
Last updated on the end of the season.

No.	Pos	Nat	Player	Total		La Liga		Copa del Rey	
No.	Pos	Nat	Player	Apps	Goals	Apps	Goals	Apps	Goals
Goalkeepers
1	GK	(Spain) ESP	Manolo Reina	36	0	36	0	0	0
25	GK	(Spain) ESP	Miquel Parera	1	0	1	0	0	0
Defenders
2	DF	(Spain) ESP	Joan Sastre	21	0	16+3	0	2	0
3	DF	(Ghana) GHA	Lumor Agbenyenu	24	1	20+3	1	1	0
5	DF	(Spain) ESP	Xisco Campos	11	0	4+5	0	2	0
15	DF	(Spain) ESP	Fran Gámez	25	0	18+5	0	1+1	0
20	DF	(Serbia) SRB	Aleksandar Sedlar	14	0	9+3	0	2	0
21	DF	(Spain) ESP	Antonio Raíllo	34	1	32	1	2	0
24	DF	(Slovakia) SVK	Martin Valjent	37	0	36	0	1	0
42	DF	(Spain) ESP	Rafael Obrador	1	0	0+1	0	0	0
Midfielders
4	MF	(Spain) ESP	Josep Señé	8	0	1+5	0	1+1	0
6	MF	(Spain) ESP	Marc Pedraza	5	0	2+1	0	1+1	0
8	MF	(Spain) ESP	Salva Sevilla	36	5	31+4	5	1	0
12	MF	(Ghana) GHA	Iddrisu Baba	37	0	35+1	0	1	0
14	MF	(Spain) ESP	Daniel Rodríguez	38	5	36+1	5	0+1	0
16	MF	(France) FRA	Yannis Salibur	4	0	0+4	0	0	0
23	MF	(Spain) ESP	Aleix Febas	32	2	22+7	0	3	2
26	MF	(Japan) JPN	Takefusa Kubo	36	4	23+12	4	1	0
41	MF	(Argentina) ARG	Luka Romero	2	0	0+1	0	1	0
Forwards
7	FW	(Spain) ESP	Alejandro Pozo	20	1	16+3	1	1	0
9	FW	(Spain) ESP	Abdón	22	0	0+20	0	2	0
11	FW	(Ivory Coast) CIV	Lago Junior	35	4	24+11	4	0	0
17	FW	(North Macedonia) MKD	Aleksandar Trajkovski	17	0	1+13	0	2+1	0
19	FW	(Argentina) ARG	Pablo Chavarría	15	0	1+12	0	1+1	0
22	FW	(Croatia) CRO	Ante Budimir	36	13	33+2	13	1	0
29	FW	(Colombia) COL	Cucho Hernández	24	5	17+5	5	1+1	0
Players who have made an appearance or had a squad number this season but have left the club
7	FW	(Spain) ESP	Aridai Cabrera	3	0	0+2	0	1	0
10	FW	(Spain) ESP	Álex Alegría	8	0	0+6	0	0+2	0
10	MF	(South Korea) KOR	Ki Sung-yueng	1	0	0+1	0	0	0
13	GK	(Spain) ESP	Fabri	4	0	1	0	3	0
18	DF	(Greece) GRE	Leonardo Koutris	2	0	1+1	0	0	0
	DF	(Ghana) GHA	Baba Rahman	5	0	2	0	3	0
