= Davide Faraon =

Italian footballer (born 1985)

Personal information
- Date of birth: 5 August 1985 (age 41)
- Place of birth: Vittorio Veneto, Italy
- Height: 1.90 m (6 ft 3 in)
- Position: Goalkeeper

Youth career
- ?–2003: Pievigina
- 2003: → Bologna (loan)
- 2004: Ancona
- 2004–2005: Perugia

Senior career*
Years	Team	Apps	(Gls)
2003–2004	Città di Castello	34	(0)
2005–2007	Padova	0	(0)
2006–2007	→ Taranto (loan)	2	(0)
2007–2009	Taranto	20	(0)
2009–2010	Paganese	0	(0)
2010–2011	Taranto	1	(0)

International career
2005	Italy U-20	1	(0)
- * Club domestic league appearances and goals

Davide Faraon (born 5 August 1985) is an Italian footballer who plays as a goalkeeper. He played in the third tier of football in Italy.

== Club career ==
=== Early career ===
Born in Vittorio Veneto, the Province of Treviso, Veneto, Faraon played for the Province of Treviso side Pievigina (located in Pieve di Soligo) before left on loan to Serie A team Bologna in January 2003. He then left for Eccellenza Umbria team Città di Castello and played 34 times (not to be confused with Group Castello).

=== Ancona, Perugia & Padova ===
In July, he was signed by Ancona but in August left for Perugia after Ancona expelled from professional league due to financial problems. However Perugia had the same fate in 2005. That season he wore no. 12 shirt but as understudy of Željko Kalac and Lorenzo Squizzi, ahead Carlo Camilli. He also played for Perugia's Primavera under-20 team as first choice, ahead Lorenzo Farinelli. In August 2005 he was signed by Serie C1 and Veneto side Padova. In July 2006 he was farmed to Taranto of Serie C1 Group B, from the Group A side Padova. In the second half of that season he was the understudy of Nicola Barasso, however he played the last 2 rounds, as well as the promotion playoffs. Eventually the team lost to Ancona in the final.

=== Taranto ===
In June 2007 Taranto bought him in co-ownership deal., while Barasso also signed in similar deal but from Genoa. Both players shared the first choice role, which Faraon played 15 times in Serie C1. In June 2008, Taranto bought the remain 50% registration rights of both players by submitted a highest bid to Lega Calcio/Lega Serie C, a mechanism to decide the ownership after both clubs failed to form an agreement. In 2008–09 season, they both became the understudy of Emanuele Nordi. In June 2009 he joined Paganese. Along with Giuseppe Saraò, they were backup for Vincenzo Melillo and experienced Armando Pantanelli.

He was released at the end of season. In December, he returned to Taranto as the third keeper, behind Nicolás Bremec and Barasso. He signed a contract until the end of season. He made his debut in the last round, winning Viareggio 1–0.

== International career ==
He capped once for Italy under-20 team at 2004–05 Four Nations Tournament. He replaced Emiliano Viviano at half time, losing to Switzerland U-20 1–3. Faraon concerned all 3 goals.
