= Barrasso =

Barrasso is a surname. Notable people with the surname include:

- John Barrasso (born 1952), United States Senator from Wyoming
- Tom Barrasso (born 1965), American ice hockey coach and player

== See also ==
- Nicola Barasso (born 1981), Italian football goalkeeper
