= Faraon (surname) =

Faraon (Spanish: Faraón) is a surname. Notable people with the surname include:

- Davide Faraon (born 1985), Italian footballer
- Rodney Faraon, American intelligence officer, briefer, and speechwriter
