= Radek Petr =

Czech footballer (born 1987)

Personal information
- Full name: Radek Petr
- Date of birth: 24 February 1987 (age 39)
- Place of birth: Vítkovice, Ostrava, Czechoslovakia
- Height: 1.90 m (6 ft 3 in)
- Position: Goalkeeper

Youth career
- Baník Ostrava

Senior career*
Years	Team	Apps	(Gls)
2006–2007	Baník Ostrava B		
2006–2007	→ Mutěnice (loan)		
2007–2010	Parma	0	(0)
2008–2009	→ Pro Patria (loan)	2	(0)
2009–2010	→ Eupen (loan)	15	(0)
2010–2012	Eupen	47	(0)
2012	Ludogorets Razgrad	2	(0)
2012–2014	FC Zbrojovka Brno	11	(0)

International career
2004	Czech U17	2	(0)
2004–2005	Czech U18	7	(0)
2005–2006	Czech U19	11	(0)
2006–2007	Czech U20	11	(0)
- * Club domestic league appearances and goals

Radek Petr (born 24 February 1987) is a Czech former professional footballer who played as a goalkeeper.

== Club career ==
Petr started his career at hometown club Baník Ostrava. In August 2007, he signed a four-year contract with Serie A side Parma for an undisclosed fee, as third keeper behind Luca Bucci and Nicola Pavarini, along with Fabio Virgili and Eros Corradini. After the relegation of Parma, he was loaned to Lega Pro Prima Divisione side Pro Patria.

In January 2009, he was loaned to Eupen at Belgian Second Division. In July 2009, his loan was extended and with option to buy in 2010. Eventually Eupen signed him for free.

== International career ==
Petr was the first choice keeper for Czech U20 at 2007 FIFA U-20 World Cup. He also played at 2006 UEFA European Under-19 Football Championship as one of the starting XI.

== Honours ==
Czech Rupublic U21

- FIFA U-20 World Cup runner-up: 2007
