= Michele Tarallo =

Italian footballer

Personal information
- Date of birth: 9 September 1980 (age 46)
- Place of birth: Nocera Inferiore, Italy
- Height: 1.90 m (6 ft 3 in)
- Position: Striker

Senior career*
Years	Team	Apps	(Gls)
1997–1998	Bari	1	(0)
1999	Bagnolese	1	(0)
1999–2001	Prato	19	(1)
2000–2001	→ Rimini (loan)	17	(0)
2001–2002	Campobasso	6	(0)
2002–2006	USO Calcio	125	(95)
2006–2009	Genoa	0	(0)
2006–2007	→ Padova (loan)	19	(6)
2007–2008	→ Monza (loan)	12	(2)
2008–2009	→ Pergocrema (loan)	18	(4)
2009–2010	Pergocrema	9	(1)
2010–2011	Savona	30	(13)
2011	Feralpisalò	13	(1)
2012	San Marino	15	(3)
2012–2013	Sarnese	9	(6)
2013–2015	Agropoli	53	(30)
2015–2017	Turris	46	(13)
2017–2018	Giugliano		
2018	Ottaviano		
2018–2020	Angri		
2020	Rocchese		
2020–2021	Sanseverinese		
- * Club domestic league appearances and goals

Michele Tarallo (born 9 September 1980) is an Italian former professional footballer who played as a striker.

== Career ==
Tarallo played 1 game in the Serie A for Bari in the 1998–99 season.

In the 2005–06 season he set a scoring record for USO Calcio in the Serie D with 36 goals in 33 appearances. In 2006, he was signed by Genoa and loaned to several clubs, including Padova, Monza and Pergocrema along with Danilo Russo and Paolo Facchinetti. In July 2009, Pergocrema completed a deal to renew Tarallo's stay. He was injured in December 2009.

In July 2010, he was signed by Savona.
