= Thomas Som =

Cameroonian footballer

Personal information
- Full name: Thomas Fabrice Som
- Date of birth: 5 August 1988 (age 38)
- Place of birth: Edéa, Cameroon
- Height: 1.76 m (5 ft 9 in)
- Position: Left back

Team information
- Current team: Borgo San Donnino

Youth career
- Crociati Il Cervo Collecchio
- 2005–2008: Parma

Senior career*
Years	Team	Apps	(Gls)
2008–2009	Parma	0	(0)
2008–2009	→ Carpenedolo (loan)	28	(1)
2009–2011	Pro Patria	25	(1)
2010	→ Pergocrema (loan)	2	(0)
2011–2012	Como	28	(1)
2012–2013	Grosseto	24	(0)
2013–2016	Benevento	55	(0)
2016	Casertana	5	(0)
2017	Taranto	10	(0)
2017	Lentigione Calcio	9	(0)
2018	Dro Alto Garda Calcio	14	(0)
2019–2020	Cattolica SM	14	(1)
2020–2021	Borgo San Donnino	0	(0)
2021	Lynx	10	(0)
2021–	Borgo San Donnino	48	(1)
- * Club domestic league appearances and goals as of 8 October 2026

Thomas Fabrice Som (born 5 August 1988) is a Cameroonian footballer who plays as a left back for Borgo San Donnino.

== Career ==
Som started his career at Italy for Crociati Noceto, located at Noceto, the Province of Parma. In January 2005, he signed a youth contract with Parma, where he started to play as a forward. He was awarded no.27 shirt of the first team in 2007–08 season. In July 2008, he left Parma's Primavera under-20 team and joined Lega Pro Seconda Divisione side Carpenedolo along with Fabio Virgili, where he made 28 league appearances. In July 2009, he joined Pro Patria in a co-ownership deal for a peppercorn of €500. But after a few appearances at Prima Divisione, he joined fellow third division club and league struggler Pergocrema on loan.

In September 2011, Som was signed by Como as free agent. In June 2012, he joined Serie B club Grosseto.
