= Massimo Gazzoli =

Italian footballer (born 1975)

Personal information
- Date of birth: 17 July 1975 (age 51)
- Place of birth: Viareggio, Italy
- Height: 1.85 m (6 ft 1 in)
- Position: Goalkeeper

Team information
- Current team: Prato

Youth career
- Empoli

Senior career*
| Years | Team | Apps | (Gls) |
| 1995–2000 | Empoli | 8 | (0) |
| 1997–1998 | → Biellese (loan) | 34 | (0) |
| 1998–1999 | → Marsala (loan) | 33 | (0) |
| 2000 | Montevarchi | 14 | (0) |
| 2000–2001 | Empoli | 0 | (0) |
| 2000–2001 | → Pisa (loan) | 28 | (0) |
| 2001–2003 | Lucchese | 66 | (0) |
| 2003–2006 | Genoa | 50 | (0) |
| 2006–2007 | Massese | 27 | (0) |
| 2007–2008 | Lucchese | 30 | (0) |
| 2008–2010 | Lumezzane | 59 | (0) |
| 2010–2012 | Carrarese | 35 | (0) |
| 2012–2014 | Viareggio | 68 | (0) |
| 2014 | Lumezzane | 13 | (0) |
| 2015– | Prato | 16 | (0) |
- * Club domestic league appearances and goals

Massimo Gazzoli (born 17 July 1975) is a former Italian football goalkeeper.

== Career ==
=== Empoli and early career ===
Born in Viareggio, the Province of Lucca, Tuscany, Gazzoli started his career at Tuscany club Empoli. He left for Serie C teams Biellese and Marsala before returning to Empoli and playing 8 Serie B games. In January 2000 he left for Montevarchi in co-ownership deal. He returned to Empoli in mid-2000, but soon he was loaned to Pisa.

=== Lucchese ===
In mid-2001, he left for home province club Lucchese in another co-ownership deal and in June 2002 the club bought the remaining 50% registration rights. The team entered 2001–02 Serie C1 promotion playoffs but lost to Triestina in the finals, after extra time. However, in the next season the team only able to remain in Serie C1 by winning Alzano Virescit in the relegation "play-out".

=== Genoa ===
In mid-2003 he was signed by Serie B club Genoa, where he was the first choice keeper ahead of Nicola Barasso. In January 2004, new signing Alessio Scarpi became the new keeper. Gazzoli won 2004–05 Serie B, but due to match fixing scandal, Genoa relegated. Gazzoli returned to starting XI, played 20 league games. The team finished as the runner-up of 2005–06 Serie C1 Group A. He became a surplus of the team after the signing of Rubinho. On 13 September 2006 he left for Massese along with Nicola Silvestri.

=== Return to Lega Pro ===
On 3 July 2007 he returned to Lucca once again. He replaced departed Alex Brunner, ahead Mathieu Moreau and Paolo Castelli. At the end of season Lucchese bankrupted, Gazzoli once again became free agent. He joined Lumezzane in July 2008, replacing departed Davide Zomer. He played 59 league matches, only missed a few and played by Roberto Zaina and Matteo Trini.

In August 2010 he was signed by Carrarese. At the end of the season he was offered a new 1-year contract. Despite the arrival of Timothy Nocchi, Gazzoli remained as the starting goalkeeper until round 8.

On 20 January 2012 Gazzoli was sold to Viareggio, his hometown club. He suppressed Mirko Ranieri as the first choice keeper.

== Honours ==
- Coppa Italia Lega Pro: 2010
