= Takefusa Kubo =

Japanese footballer (born 2001)

Personal information
- Full name: Takefusa Kubo
- Date of birth: 4 June 2001 (age 25)
- Place of birth: Asao-ku, Kawasaki, Kanagawa, Japan
- Height: 1.73 m (5 ft 8 in)
- Position: Right winger

Team information
- Current team: Real Sociedad
- Number: 14

Youth career
- 2004–2005: Sakahama SC
- 2006–2007: Yurigaoka Junior SC
- 2008–2009: FC Persimmon
- 2010–2011: Kawasaki Frontale
- 2011–2015: Barcelona
- 2015–2016: FC Tokyo

Senior career*
Years	Team	Apps	(Gls)
2016–2018	FC Tokyo U-23	34	(5)
2016–2019	FC Tokyo	19	(4)
2018	→ Yokohama F. Marinos (loan)	5	(1)
2019–2022	Real Madrid	0	(0)
2019–2020	→ Mallorca (loan)	35	(4)
2020–2021	→ Villarreal (loan)	13	(0)
2021	→ Getafe (loan)	18	(1)
2021–2022	→ Mallorca (loan)	28	(1)
2022–	Real Sociedad	134	(24)

International career^{‡}
2015–2016	Japan U16	17	(11)
2016–2017	Japan U17	11	(4)
2016–2018	Japan U20	15	(3)
2018	Japan U21	2	(0)
2019–2021	Japan U23	16	(7)
2019–	Japan	55	(8)
Medal record
Men's football
Representing Japan
AFC U-19 Championship
Bronze medal – third place	2018 Indonesia
- * Club domestic league appearances and goals as of 22 November 2026 ‡ National team caps and goals as of 14 November 2026

Takefusa Kubo (久保 建英, Kubo Takefusa; IPA: [kɯbo takeɸɯsa], born 4 June 2001), nicknamed Take (タケ), is a Japanese professional footballer who plays as a right winger for La Liga club Real Sociedad and the Japan national team. He has been dubbed "Japanese Messi" by Japanese football fans because of his technical ability.

== Club career ==
=== Early career ===
At the age of seven, Kubo started playing football for some local clubs in his hometown, Kawasaki. In August 2009, he was awarded the MVP at FC Barcelona Soccer Camp in which he participated at the age of eight. In April 2010, he was selected as a member of FC Barcelona School team and participated in Sodexo European Rusas Cup held in Belgium. He was awarded MVP even though his team finished third. After returning home, he began to play for the Kawasaki Frontale junior youth team.

=== Barcelona ===
In August 2011, Kubo had been invited to join FC Barcelona's youth Academy, La Masia, after passing the trial. He began to play for Barca Aleví C (U11). During his first full season (2012–13), he was top goalscorer in the league with 74 goals in 30 games. In his third full season (2014–15), he was promoted to Barca Infantil A (U14). The Spanish club was later found to have violated FIFA's international transfer policy for under-18 youths, making Kubo ineligible to play for the club. He returned to Japan in March 2015 in search of playing time, signing with FC Tokyo’s junior youth team.

=== FC Tokyo ===
Kubo joined FC Tokyo U-18 team in 2016. In September 2016, he was promoted to the senior side at the age of fifteen. On 5 November, he made his formal debut for the reserve team in the J3 League as a halftime sub for match against AC Nagano Parceiro. He made his professional debut at the J.League record of 15 years, five months and one day.

On 15 April 2017 Kubo became the youngest player to score in the J.League at 15 years, ten months in a 1–0 win over Cerezo Osaka U-23. On 3 May, he top-flight debuted for the first-team in J.League YBC Levain Cup playing 25 minutes in a 1–0 win against Hokkaido Consadole Sapporo. In November 2017, FC Tokyo announced an update to Kubo's contract improving it to pay him as a first-team member.

==== Yokohama F. Marinos (loan) ====
On 16 August 2018, Kubo joined Yokohama F. Marinos on a half-year loan. He immediately scored on his debut with Marinos in an away game against Vissel Kobe.

From the start of the 2019 season, Kubo became a regular starter for FC Tokyo in both the J.League YBC Levain Cup and J.League scoring goals in both competitions.

=== Real Madrid ===
On 14 June 2019, Kubo signed with Spanish club Real Madrid on a five-year deal. Although registered with their U-19 team, he had been expected to mainly play for Real Madrid B during the 2019–20 season. However, he featured regularly with the first team during Real Madrid's preseason tour of the United States and Germany.

==== Mallorca (loan) ====
On 22 August 2019, Kubo joined Mallorca on a season-long loan, becoming the third Japanese player in Mallorca history after Yoshito Ōkubo and Akihiro Ienaga. On 1 September, he made his La Liga debut, playing 15 minutes in a 2–0 loss to Valencia. He became the youngest Japanese player in the Top 4 European leagues history that has played in a match with a record of 18 years, 2 months, and 28 days. On 10 November, he scored his first goal for the club in a 3–1 victory against Villarreal. He later scored his second goal in an entertaining 3–3 draw to Real Betis on 21 February 2020. Two weeks later, he scored a game-winner in a 2–1 victory over Eibar.

==== Loans to Villarreal and Getafe ====
On 10 August 2020, he was loaned to Villarreal until the end of the 2020–21 season. After being mainly used as a substitute, his loan was cut short on 8 January 2021.

Immediately after leaving Villarreal, Kubo moved to fellow top-tier side Getafe on loan for the remainder of the season.

==== Return to Mallorca ====
On 12 August 2021, Kubo rejoined Mallorca on a season-long loan. On 4 December, Kubo scored a stoppage-time winner in a 2–1 victory at the Wanda Metropolitano against Atlético Madrid.

=== Real Sociedad ===
On 19 July 2022, Kubo joined Real Sociedad on a permanent deal, becoming the first Japanese player to sign with the club. Kubo marked his debut by scoring the only goal in a 1–0 win away to Cádiz in their opening game of the season in La Liga. On 18 September 2023, Kubo's adept performance against his former club Real Madrid earned him recognition despite Real Sociedad's 2–1 defeat. On 22 October 2023, Kubo was instrumental in leading Real Sociedad to a 1–0 win over Mallorca, earning the man-of-the-match title for his performance.

On 18 April 2026 Kubo came off the bench in the 88th minute as Real Sociedad beat Atletico Madrid on penalties to win the Copa del Rey.

== Style of play ==
Kubo is a left-footed attacking player most commonly deployed as a right winger, although he has also played as an attacking midfielder or second striker. He combines close control, rapid acceleration and changes of direction to beat opponents in one-on-one situations. From the right, he often cuts inside onto his stronger left foot to shoot or play passes through defensive lines, but can also move outside to deliver crosses. He is also comfortable receiving the ball between the lines and linking play in central areas.

Coaches' Voice identified the variety and consistency of his crossing with his weaker right foot as an area for further development. A 2025 assessment by Javi Silles, deputy editor of Spanish newspaper AS, also questioned his consistency across a full season. The same analysis noted his willingness to press and recover defensively, while observing that he could occasionally fail to track opponents making runs into space behind him.

== International career ==
Kubo has been involved in Japan national teams from U-15 to senior level. At the age of fifteen, he was selected to the Japan U-20 national team for the 2017 FIFA U-20 World Cup.

Shortly before turning eighteen, Kubo was named in the squad for the 2019 Copa América, which marked his first call up to the senior squad. He made his debut on 9 June 2019 in a friendly against El Salvador, as a 67th-minute substitute for Takumi Minamino. In July 2021, he was included in the 22-player squad of the under-23 team for the 2020 Summer Olympics.

On 22 July 2021, Kubo scored Japan's first goal against South Africa in the 2020 Olympics.

On 1 November 2022, Kubo was named in the Japan squad for the 2022 FIFA World Cup, where he started in the group stage victories over Germany and Spain, despite being subbed off early in both matches.

On 15 May 2026, Kubo was selected in the 26-man squad for the 2026 FIFA World Cup.

== Personal life ==
Kubo speaks Spanish fluently, and is also proficient in conversational English.

On 2 October 2026, Kubo announced his marriage to Japanese actress Haruka Fukuhara on his social media.

== Career statistics ==
=== Club ===
As of match played 22 November 2026

Appearances and goals by club, season and competition
Club	Season	League			National cup (Note: Includes Emperor's Cup, Copa del Rey)		League cup (Note: Includes J.League Cup)		Continental		Other		Total	
Club	Season	Division	Apps	Goals	Apps	Goals	Apps	Goals	Apps	Goals	Apps	Goals	Apps	Goals
FC Tokyo U-23	2016	J3 League	3	0	—		—		—		—		3	0
FC Tokyo U-23	2017	J3 League	21	2	—		—		—		—		21	2
FC Tokyo U-23	2018	J3 League	10	3	—		—		—		—		10	3
FC Tokyo U-23	Total		34	5	—		—		—		—		34	5
FC Tokyo	2017	J1 League	2	0	0	0	2	0	—		—		4	0
FC Tokyo	2018	J1 League	4	0	0	0	6	1	—		—		10	1
FC Tokyo	2019	J1 League	13	4	0	0	3	1	—		—		16	5
FC Tokyo	Total		19	4	0	0	11	2	—		—		30	6
Yokohama F. Marinos (loan)	2018	J1 League	5	1	1	0	0	0	—		—		6	1
Real Madrid	2019–20	La Liga	0	0	0	0	—		—		—		0	0
Mallorca (loan)	2019–20	La Liga	35	4	1	0	—		—		—		36	4
Villarreal (loan)	2020–21	La Liga	13	0	1	0	—		5 (Note: Appearances in UEFA Europa League)	1	—		19	1
Getafe (loan)	2020–21	La Liga	18	1	0	0	—		0	0	—		18	1
Mallorca (loan)	2021–22	La Liga	28	1	3	1	—		—		—		31	2
Real Sociedad	2022–23	La Liga	35	9	2	0	—		7	0	—		44	9
Real Sociedad	2023–24	La Liga	30	7	3	0	—		8 (Note: Appearances in UEFA Champions League)	0	—		41	7
Real Sociedad	2024–25	La Liga	36	5	5	0	—		11	2	—		52	7
Real Sociedad	2025–26	La Liga	24	2	3	0	—		—		—		27	2
Real Sociedad	2026–27	La Liga	9	1	0	0	—		3	0	0	0	12	1
Real Sociedad	Total		134	24	13	0	—		29	2	0	0	176	26
Career total			286	40	19	1	11	2	34	3	0	0	350	46

=== International ===
As of match played 14 November 2026

Appearances and goals by national team and year
National team	Year	Apps	Goals
Japan	2019	7	0
Japan	2020	4	0
Japan	2021	2	0
Japan	2022	9	1
Japan	2023	7	2
Japan	2024	11	2
Japan	2025	8	2
Japan	2026	7	1
Total		55	8

Scores and results list Japan's goal tally first, score column indicates score after each Kubo goal.

List of international goals scored by Takefusa Kubo
No.	Date	Venue	Opponent	Score	Result	Competition
1	10 June 2022	Noevir Stadium Kobe, Kobe, Japan	Ghana	3–1	4–1	2022 Kirin Cup
2	15 June 2023	Toyota Stadium, Toyota, Japan	El Salvador	3–0	6–0	2023 Kirin Challenge Cup
3	21 November 2023	Prince Abdullah Al Faisal Stadium, Jeddah, Saudi Arabia	Syria	1–0	5–0	2026 FIFA World Cup qualification
4	31 January 2024	Al Thumama Stadium, Doha, Qatar	Bahrain	2–0	3–1	2023 AFC Asian Cup
5	5 September 2024	Saitama Stadium 2002, Saitama, Japan	China	7–0	7–0	2026 FIFA World Cup qualification
6	20 March 2025	Saitama Stadium 2002, Saitama, Japan	Bahrain	2–0	2–0	2026 FIFA World Cup qualification
7	10 June 2025	Suita City Football Stadium, Suita, Japan	Indonesia	2–0	6–0	2026 FIFA World Cup qualification
8	14 November 2026	National Stadium, Kallang, Singapore	Brazil	1–0	3–2	2026 Mizuho Blue Challenge

== Honours ==
Villarreal

- UEFA Europa League: 2020–21

Real Sociedad

- Copa del Rey: 2025–26

Individual

- La Liga Player of the Month: September 2023
- UEFA La Liga Revelation Team of the Year: 2019–20
- IFFHS Asian Men's Team of the Year: 2021, 2024, 2025
- Japan Pro-Footballers Association Awards Best XI: 2022, 2023
- Real Sociedad Player of the Season: 2022–23
