= Timothy Nocchi =

Italian footballer (born 1990)

Personal information
- Date of birth: 7 July 1990 (age 36)
- Place of birth: Cecina, Italy
- Height: 1.90 m (6 ft 3 in)
- Position: Goalkeeper

Team information
- Current team: Venturina Calcio

Youth career
- Juventus

Senior career*
Years	Team	Apps	(Gls)
2009–2018	Juventus	0	(0)
2009–2010	→ Rosignano (loan)	32	(0)
2010–2011	→ Poggibonsi (loan)	23	(0)
2011–2012	→ Carrarese (loan)	24	(0)
2012–2013	→ Juve Stabia (loan)	25	(0)
2013–2014	→ Carpi (loan)	5	(0)
2014	→ Padova (loan)	5	(0)
2014–2015	→ Spezia (loan)	0	(0)
2015	→ Pro Vercelli (loan)	0	(0)
2015–2016	→ Carrarese (loan)	3	(0)
2016–2017	→ Tuttocuoio (loan)	40	(0)
2017–2018	→ Perugia (loan)	8	(0)
2018–2021	Juventus U23	30	(0)
2021–2022	Catanzaro	5	(0)
2022–2023	Monopoli	7	(0)
2023	Piacenza	7	(0)
2024–2025	ASD New Rosignano Solvay 1922		
2025–	Venturina Calcio		
- * Club domestic league appearances and goals as of 8 October 2026

Timothy Nocchi (born 7 July 1990) is an Italian footballer who plays as a goalkeeper for Venturina Calcio.

== Career ==
=== Juventus ===
Born in Cecina, Tuscany, Nocchi began his career with Italian and European giants, Juventus. Initially part of the club's youth academy, he was promoted to the Primavera (under-20) youth team in 2008, following many seasons within the club's various other youth teams. He was promoted to the first-team at the conclusion of the 2008–09 season, having served as the backup goalkeeper to Carlo Pinsoglio for the Primavera. Upon his promotion to the Juventus first-team, Nocchi was sent out on loan to Serie D side, Rosignano, where he served as the club's starting goalkeeper, making 32 league appearances for the club in his first season. On 30 June 2010, Nocchi returned to Juventus, only to be loaned out to Lega Pro Seconda Divisione side Poggibonsi, where he would appear in 22 matches for the fourth-division club. Nocchi returned to Juventus once more on 30 June 2011.

Soon after his return, and on from signing a new 3-year contract, Nocchi was again sent out on loan. In July 2011, the young goalkeeper joined Carrarese, who were looking to bolster their squad following promotion to the Lega Pro Prima Divisione. Nocchi was the backup of Massimo Gazzoli for the first 8 rounds, and became the first choice beginning from round 9. He concluded the season having made 24 appearances for the club, and returned to Juventus again on 1 July 2012. After renewing his contract with i bianconeri once more (to 2016), Nocchi was sent out on loan to Serie B outfit, Juve Stabia a few days later. He signed for the club as a direct replacement for Simone Colombi who returned to Atalanta following a similar one-year loan deal during the 2011–12 Serie B campaign. Nocchi served as the first-choice goalkeeper for the gialloblu for much of the campaign; he made 25 appearances as a starter.

Nocchi returned to Juventus on 30 June 2013, before being sent back on loan to Serie B side, Carpi on 19 July 2013. It was announced the club will then have the option to purchase a co-ownership share of the player's contract following the 2013–14 Serie B campaign. After appearing in just 5 matches for the newly promoted club, Juventus and Carpi agreed to terminate the loan deal early, with the player returning to Juventus in January 2014.

On 14 January 2014, Nocchi joined Serie B club Padova on a six-month loan deal to conclude the 2013–14 Serie B campaign.

After initially returning to Juventus once again on 30 June 2014, Nocchi was soon sent out on another season-long loan deal. He also signed a new 3-year contract with The Old Lady. On 25 July 2014, Spezia Calcio officially communicated the transfer of the goalkeeper on a temporary loan agreement with the option to purchase outright upon the conclusion of the 2014–15 Serie B campaign. Nocchi effectively was signed by the Ligurians as a direct replacement for fellow Juventus loanee, Nicola Leali, who had spent the previous campaign on loan at the club. However, Nocchi became the backup of Alex Cordaz instead.

On 31 August 2015 he goes another time on loan to Carrarese after spending pre-season with Pro Vercelli.

He was signed by Tuttocuoio on 25 July 2016. In 2017 he was signed by Perugia.

=== Juventus U23 ===
In mid-2018, he returned to Juventus for the newly established B team in Serie C. He signed a new 1-year contract in August 2019. On 27 June 2020, Nocchi won his first trophy, the 2019–20 Coppa Italia Serie C, after a 2–1 win against Ternana in the final.

=== Catanzaro ===
On 2 September 2021, he joined Serie C club Catanzaro on a one-year contract with an option to extend for a second year.

=== Monopoli ===
On 22 September 2022, Nocchi signed with Monopoli until the end of the 2022–23 season.

=== Piacenza ===
On 31 January 2023, Nocchi moved to Piacenza on a six-months deal.

== Honours ==
=== Club ===
Juventus U23

- Coppa Italia Serie C: 2019–20
