= Alessio Scarpi =

Italian footballer (born 1973)

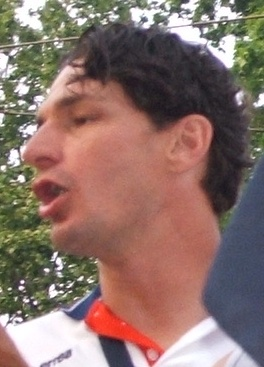

Personal information
- Date of birth: 19 April 1973 (age 53)
- Place of birth: Jesolo, Italy
- Height: 1.88 m (6 ft 2 in)
- Position: Goalkeeper

Youth career
- 1992–1995: Cagliari

Senior career*
Years	Team	Apps	(Gls)
1995–1997	Reggina	65	(0)
1997–2001	Cagliari	130	(0)
2002	Ancona	14	(0)
2002–2003	Internazionale	0	(0)
2002–2003	→ Ancona (loan)	50	(0)
2004–2012	Genoa	96	(0)
Total		355	(0)
- * Club domestic league appearances and goals

Alessio Scarpi (born 19 April 1973, in Jesolo) is an Italian Football coach and former football goalkeeper, He is currently the goalkeeper coach of Serie A club Genoa.

== Football career ==
=== Reggina & Cagliari ===
Although born in Veneto, Scarpi started his career at Cagliari. He played for Reggina in two Serie B seasons before returning to Cagliari in the summer of 1997; during the 1997–98 season, he helped Cagliari obtain promotion to Serie A with a third-place finish in Serie B. He made his Serie A debut with Cagliari on 13 September 1998, in a 2–2 home draw with Internazionale.

He helped the team avoid relegation until the summer of 2000, as his side finished in second-last place in the league. Cagliari failed to obtain promotion back to Serie A in 2000–01 season, as they only managed a mid-table finish.

Scarpi lost his regular place in the starting line-up during the 2001–02 season, to new signing Armando Pantanelli.

=== Ancona ===
Scarpi joined Ancona of Serie B in February 2002.

He was signed by Serie A side Inter on 8 May 2002, but was loaned back to Ancona on 11 July 2002, where he won promotion from Serie B to Serie A once again.

Due to his successful season with the club, his loan was extended on 15 July 2003. Although his second Serie A season was less successful, as he conceded 25 goals in 13 games and failed to prevent the club's relegation, he was signed by Genoa of Serie B on 8 January 2004.

=== Genoa ===
Once again, Scarpi helped Genoa obtain Serie A promotion during the 2004–05 season, but due to the club's involvement in a match fixing scandal, Genoa was relegated. He followed Genoa to play in Serie C1, making his personal debut in the Italian third division that season; he played only 14 times for the club during the 2005–06 season, as the regular starting spot was later given to second goalkeeper Massimo Gazzoli, who made 20 appearances. Scarpi returned to Serie B in the summer of 2006, for his 9th season in the Italian second division. Despite the departure of Gazzoli, and subsequently of the youth product Nicola Barasso in January, Scarpi lost his place in the starting line-up yet again to Rubinho. He played only once in the 2006–07 season.

Scarpi followed Genoa back to Serie A in the summer of 2007, for his 4th Serie A season. He earned some chances to play during the season and made 14 appearances. In 2009–10 season, Genoa swapped Rubinho with Marco Amelia, and that season Scarpi played 8 times. In the next season, he became the understudy of Portuguese international Eduardo. On 19 May he signed a new 1-year contract with the club.

== Career statistics ==
=== Club ===
Appearances and goals by club, season and competition
Club	Season	League			National cup		Europe		Other		Total	
Club	Season	Division	Apps	Goals	Apps	Goals	Apps	Goals	Apps	Goals	Apps	Goals
Cagliari	1994–95	Serie A	0	0	0	0	—		—		0	0
Reggina	1995–96	Serie B	33	0	0	0	—		—		33	0
Reggina	1996–97	Serie B	32	0	1	0	—		—		33	0
Reggina	Total		65	0	1	0	—		—		66	0
Cagliari	1997–98	Serie B	31	0	4	0	—		—		35	0
Cagliari	1998–99	Serie A	32	0	4	0	—		—		36	0
Cagliari	1999–2000	Serie A	32	0	8	0	—		—		40	0
Cagliari	2000–01	Serie B	35	0	3	0	—		—		38	0
Cagliari	Total		130	0	19	0	—		—		149	0
Ancona	2001–02	Serie B	14	0	0	0	—		—		14	0
Ancona (loan)	2002–03	Serie B	37	0	5	0	—		—		42	0
Ancona (loan)	2003–04	Serie A	13	0	1	0	—		—		14	0
Ancona (loan)	Total		50	0	6	0	—		—		56	0
Genoa	2003–04	Serie B	22	0	—		—		—		22	0
Genoa	2004–05	Serie B	35	0	2	0	—		—		37	0
Genoa	2005–06	Serie C1	14	0	0	0	—		—		14	0
Genoa	2006–07	Serie B	1	0	1	0	—		—		2	0
Genoa	2007–08	Serie A	14	0	0	0	—		—		14	0
Genoa	2008–09	Serie A	2	0	2	0	—		—		4	0
Genoa	2009–10	Serie A	8	0	1	0	3	0	—		12	0
Genoa	2010–11	Serie A	0	0	3	0	—		—		3	0
Genoa	2011–12	Serie A	0	0	0	0	—		—		0	0
Genoa	Total		96	0	9	0	3	0	—		108	0
Career total			355	0	35	0	3	0	0	0	393	0

== Honours ==
Cagliari

- Serie A Promotion: 1997–98 (Serie B Third Place)

Ancona

- Serie A Promotion: 2002–03 (Serie B Fourth Place)

Genoa

- Serie B Promotion: 2005–06 (Serie C1 Runner-up)
- Serie A Promotion: 2006–07 (Serie B Third Place)
