= Paolo Facchinetti =

Italian footballer (born 1984)

Personal information
- Date of birth: 6 March 1984 (age 42)
- Place of birth: Calcinate, Italy
- Height: 1.72 m (5 ft 8 in)
- Positions: Right winger; forward

Team information
- Current team: Scanzorosciate

Youth career
- 2003–2004: Atalanta

Senior career*
| Years | Team | Apps | (Gls) |
| 2004–2006 | Montichiari | 45 | (13) |
| 2006–2010 | Genoa | 0 | (0) |
| 2006–2007 | → Padova (loan) | 11 | (1) |
| 2007–2008 | → Pro Sesto (loan) | 28 | (3) |
| 2008–2009 | → Pergocrema (loan) | 27 | (2) |
| 2010–2011 | Savona | 31 | (2) |
| 2011–2012 | Caravaggio | 30 | (4) |
| 2012–2014 | Grumellese | 40+ | (10+) |
| 2014– | Scanzorosciate | 79 | (17) |

International career
| 2000 | Italy U15 | 8 | (3) |
| 2000–2001 | Italy U16 | 12 | (7) |
| 2002 | Italy U18 | 4 | (2) |
| 2002 | Italy U19 | 1 | (0) |
| 2005 | Italy Mediterranean Games | 1 | (0) |
| 2011 | Universiade in Cina | 3 | (0) |
- * Club domestic league appearances and goals

Paolo Facchinetti (born 6 March 1984) is an Italian footballer who plays as a midfielder.

== Club career ==
Born in Calcinate, the Province of Bergamo, Facchinetti started his career with hometown club Atalanta. He graduated from the Primavera under-19 team in 2003. He then left Atalanta and started his professional career with Serie C2 side Montichiari in 2004. He scored 10 league goals in 2005–06 Serie C2 season, ⅓ of the team scored. He then signed by Serie B side Genoa in 5-year deal on free transfer but left for Serie C1 side Padova along with Michele Tarallo. He was ruled out in January 2007. In July 2007 he left for Padova's league rival Pro Sesto along with Rodrigue Boisfer from Genoa, now promoted to Serie A. In July 2008, he remained at Lega Pro Prima Divisione (ex-Serie C1) Group A, but for Pergocrema along with Tarallo and Danilo Russo.

In 2009–10 season, Genoa failed to find a club for Facchinetti, made him "without" a club for a season, but costed Genoa €5,200 as amortization and wage. On 16 July 2010, newly promoted Lega Pro Seconda Divisione side Savona signed him from Genoa on free transfer. Later Tarallo also joined him on 23 July.

== International career ==
Pederzoli capped for Italy at 2001 UEFA European Under-16 Football Championship, lost to Spain in quarter-final, eventually Spain was the champion. In that match, he replaced Alex Pederzoli in the 35th minute. He partnered with Atalanta's team-mate Giampaolo Pazzini in the attack. That match the coach filled 5 defenders (Giorgio Chiellini as wing-back) and 1 strikers at the starting XI (541 or 451). He also started the first 2 matches in the Group stage, but in the third match the coach preferred Luigi Della Rocca to partner with Pazzini. The Azzurrini's starting XI also filled with team-mate Mauro Belotti and Gabriele Perico. Italy lost 3–4 in penalty shootout.

In 2005, he was called to Italy U21 B team (specially for 2005 Mediterranean Games), against Serie D Best XI. He played his only match with the team against Morocco.

In 2012, he moved to "eccellenza" side Caravaggio, with whom he won the championship.
