= Lorenzo Farinelli =

Italian footballer

Personal information
- Date of birth: 10 August 1987 (age 39)
- Place of birth: Todi, Italy
- Height: 1.82 m (5 ft 11 1/2 in)
- Position: Goalkeeper

Youth career
- 2001–2005: Perugia
- 2005–2007: Triestina

Senior career*
Years	Team	Apps	(Gls)
2007–2009	Triestina	0	(0)
2007–2008	→ Vibonese (loan)	1	(0)
2009–2010	Sangiustese	4	(0)
2010–2011	San Marco Juventina		

International career
2005–2006	Italy U-19	3	(0)
- * Club domestic league appearances and goals

Lorenzo Farinelli (born 10 August 1987) is a former Italian professional footballer who played as a goalkeeper in the fourth tier of football in Italy.

== Club career ==
Born in Todi, the Province of Perugia, Farinelli started his career at Perugia. After the club was expelled from professional league in 2005, he was signed by Triestina. In 2007, he was loaned to Vibonese with option to co-own the player. Vibonese did excised the rights in June 2008 but in August he returned to Triestina and awarded no.12 shirt. he was the understudy of David Dei and Michael Agazzi. In July 2009 he left for Sangiustese.

In summer 2010 he retired from professional football and played for Eccellenza Umbria team San Marco Juventina, which located in San Marco frazione, Perugia.

== International career ==
He was the third keeper at 2006 UEFA European Under-19 Football Championship qualification, behind Andrea Consigli and Giacomo Bindi. Despite the team failed to qualify to the elite round in October, he played for the team as overage player in the friendlies from December 2005 to May 2006, which FIGC organised difference friendly for U-19 and Italy U-20 team but both team composited with players born 1987 (but also consist of other age group). He substituted Salvatore Sirigu and Consigli (twice) respectively.
