= Carlo Camilli =

Italian footballer (born 1984)

Personal information
- Date of birth: 2 October 1984 (age 42)
- Place of birth: Umbertide, Italy
- Position: Goalkeeper

Team information
- Current team: Ternana

Youth career
- Teramo

Senior career*
Years	Team	Apps	(Gls)
2004–2005	Perugia	0	(0)
2005–2006	YF Juventus		
2006–2008	Sansovino	2	(0)
2008–2009	Colligiana	0	(0)
2009–2010	Ascoli	0	(0)
2010–2011	Pescara	0	(0)
2011	Ternana	0	(0)
- * Club domestic league appearances and goals

Carlo Camilli (born 2 October 1984) is an Italian footballer who plays for Ternana as a goalkeeper.

== Career ==
Born in Umbertide, the Province of Perugia, Camilli played for Perugia in 2004–05 Serie B. He wore no.31 shirt as fourth keeper, behind Željko Kalac, Lorenzo Squizzi and Davide Faraon. After Perugia expelled from professional league in 2005, he left for Swiss side Young Fellows Juventus and returned to Sansovino the following summer. In summer 2008 he was signed by Colligiana and in August signed by Serie B team Ascoli. On 19 August 2010 he was signed by Serie B newcomer Pescara and awarded no.13 shirt. He was the understudy of Salvatore Pinna, Gabriele Bartoletti along with youngster Francesco Cattenari. In August 2011 he left for Ternana Calcio, as the backup of Stefano Ambrosi along with Fabio Virgili.

His father died when Camilli was age 26, leaving him to run the family's metalworking business. Camilli initially played football while he was managing the business, but ultimately had to retire from playing due to his business responsibilities.
