= Luca Bucci =

Italian footballer (born 1969)

Personal information
- Date of birth: 13 March 1969 (age 57)
- Place of birth: Bologna, Italy
- Height: 1.80 m (5 ft 11 in)
- Position: Goalkeeper

Youth career
- 1984–1986: Parma

Senior career*
Years	Team	Apps	(Gls)
1986–1990	Parma	5	(0)
1987	→ Pro Patria (loan)	1	(0)
1987–1988	→ Rimini (loan)	1	(0)
1990–1992	Casertana	67	(0)
1992–1993	Reggiana	36	(0)
1993–1998	Parma	95	(0)
1997	→ Perugia (loan)	17	(0)
1998–2003	Torino	160	(0)
2003–2004	Empoli	17	(0)
2005–2008	Parma	81	(0)
2009	Napoli	1	(0)
Total		481	(0)

International career
1994–1995	Italy	3	(0)
Medal record
Representing Italy
FIFA World Cup
Runner-up	1994
- * Club domestic league appearances and goals

Luca Bucci (Italian pronunciation: [ˈluːka ˈbuttʃi]; born 13 March 1969) is an Italian former professional footballer who played as a goalkeeper. Bucci played for several Italian clubs throughout his career; he is mostly remembered for his choice of unusual shirt numbers and successful spell with Parma, where he won various domestic and European titles. At international level, he represented the Italy national team and was an unused member of the team that reached the 1994 FIFA World Cup final, as well as a reserve at UEFA Euro 1996.

== Club career ==
Born in Bologna, Bucci spent a few years in the third and second levels (winning the 1992–93 Serie B title with Reggiana). He made his Serie A debut playing for Parma, in a league match against Udinese on 29 August 1993. He soon achieved prominence during a particularly successful stint with the club, winning an UEFA Supercup in 1993, and an UEFA Cup in 1995; he also received runners-up medals in the Coppa Italia, in the Cup Winners' Cup, in the Supercoppa Italiana, and in Serie A with the club. Bucci was the starting keeper for Parma when they won the UEFA cup in 1995. At Parma, however, Bucci was soon overtaken by the emergence of 18-year-old Primavera keeper Gianluigi Buffon during the 1996–97 season. Bucci started the season as the starting keeper for the first seven games. After a dispute with coach Carlo Ancelotti and emergence of Buffon, Bucci left the team in order to play more regularly.

After playing six months for Perugia, Bucci joined second-tier Torino in 1997, later gaining promotion to Serie A throughout his time with the Turin club after winning the 2000–01 Serie B title with the club, and remaining with the granata for six seasons, until his contract expired. He then decided to join Empoli. However, he only managed to play in half of the games, while the club was eventually relegated, with Bucci leaving at the end of season.

After six months without a club, Bucci moved back to Parma in January 2005 to replace Gianluca Berti who left for Torino, initially as a reserve goalkeeper. He was the first choice after Sébastien Frey’s departure, ahead of Cristiano Lupatelli and Matteo Guardalben in the 2005–06 season, Alfonso De Lucia and Fabio Virgili in the 2006–07 season, Nicola Pavarini and Radek Petr in the 2007–08 season. After Parma's relegated he was released in June 2008.

After another seven months as a free agent, he joined Napoli, following an injury crisis that hit the club. He made his debut with Napoli on 19 April, in a 2–0 away loss to Cagliari, becoming the fifth goalkeeper to be used by the azzurri in the 2008–09 season (the other four being Gennaro Iezzo, Nicolás Navarro, Matteo Gianello and Luigi Sepe).

== International career ==
Uncapped, Bucci was called by Italy manager Arrigo Sacchi as Italy's third goalkeeper for the 1994 FIFA World Cup in the United States, behind Gianluca Pagliuca and Luca Marchegiani, making no appearances. Italy finished the tournament in second place, after losing on penalties in the final against Brazil after a 0–0 draw. He would make his full debut on 21 December of that year, appearing in a 3–1 friendly win over Turkey at the Stadio Adriatico. He was also a back-up goalkeeper for Italy at UEFA Euro 1996, behind Angelo Peruzzi, and ahead of Francesco Toldo. In total, Bucci made three senior appearances for Italy between 1994 and 1996.

== Style of play ==
In spite of his relatively short stature for a goalkeeper, Bucci was a reliable and physically strong keeper, who was known for his consistency, athleticism, explosiveness, agility, and acrobatic style of play; although he had a reserved character, he was a confident and resolute goalkeeper, with a strong temper, who often stood out for his instinctive and aggressive playing style. Considered to be one of the best Italian goalkeepers of his generation, throughout his career, he was highly regarded for his speed when rushing off his line to anticipate strikers outside the area who had beaten the offside trap, and for his ability to get to ground quickly to collect or parry the ball, and was also effective at stopping penalties. Furthermore, Bucci was highly competent with the ball at his feet, and often functioned as a sweeper-keeper in teams which relied on a zonal marking system and high defensive lines. Due to his distribution, he was also capable of starting plays and launching attacks from the back. Bucci also stood out for his longevity.

== Post-playing career ==
After the 2008–09 season, Bucci decided to retire from professional football and became a youth team goalkeeper coach at Parma. In 2015, he joined Bologna as the club's goalkeeping coach, under his former Parma manager Roberto Donadoni.

== Honours ==
Reggiana

- Serie B: 1992–93

Parma

- UEFA Cup: 1994–95
- UEFA Super Cup: 1993

Torino

- Serie B: 2000–01
