= Emanuele Nordi =

Italian footballer (born 1984)

Personal information
- Date of birth: 23 April 1984 (age 42)
- Place of birth: Comacchio, Italy
- Height: 1.84 m (6 ft 0 in)
- Position: Goalkeeper

Senior career*
Years	Team	Apps	(Gls)
2002–2004	CerGas Bologna	66	(0)
2004	Val di Sangro	3	(0)
2004–2005	Rovigo	14	(0)
2005–2007	SPAL	50	(0)
2007–2008	Teramo	34	(0)
2008–2009	Taranto	21	(0)
2009–2011	Gela	63	(0)
2011–2012	Frosinone	23	(0)
2012–2014	Trapani	71	(0)
2014–2016	Alessandria	46	(0)
2016–2017	AlbinoLeffe	31	(0)
2017–2018	Catanzaro	33	(0)
2018–2019	Virtus Francavilla	24	(0)
2019–2020	Sicula Leonzio	16	(0)
2021	Pistoiese	6	(0)
- * Club domestic league appearances and goals as of 2 May 2021

Emanuele Nordi (born 23 April 1984) is an Italian footballer who plays as a goalkeeper.

== Career ==
Born in Comacchio, in historic region Emilia, Nordi started his career in Serie D team CerGas Bologna (renamed to Crevalcore in 2003), which located in Crevalcore, near the region capital Bologna. In 2004, he left for Val di Sangro and in November left for Rovigo. In 2005, he was signed a professional club SPAL, which 48 km away from Comacchio. He spent 1 1/2 seasons as the first choice, ahead Marco Varaldi but replaced by Gianni Careri in December 2006.

In 2007, he left for Teramo. in 2008 he moved to the third division side Taranto, ahead Nicola Barasso and Davide Faraon as first choice. On 29 August 2009 he was signed by Gela. Since 2010–11 season he was backed by Angelo Maraglino and previously Gabriele Ferla.

On 23 August 2011 he was signed by Frosinone. In 2012, he moved back to Sicily by joining Trapani, and being instrumental in the club's historic first promotion ever to Serie B.

From 2014 to 2016 played for Alessandria; in October 2016 signing for Albinoleffe.

On 28 November 2018, he signed with Virtus Francavilla.

On 1 August 2019 he joined Sicula Leonzio.

On 21 March 2021 he signed with Pistoiese.
