= Fabio Virgili =

Italian footballer

Personal information
- Date of birth: 26 April 1986 (age 40)
- Place of birth: Terni, Italy
- Height: 1.86 m (6 ft 1 in)
- Position: Goalkeeper

Youth career
- Terni Est
- Parma
- 2005–2006: Napoli

Senior career*
Years	Team	Apps	(Gls)
2006–2009	Parma	0	(0)
2008–2009	→ Carpenedolo (loan)	26	(0)
2009–2010	Sporting Terni	23	(0)
2010–2011	Paganese	0	(0)
2011–2012	Ternana	2	(0)
2012	Botev Vratsa	0	(0)
2013	Narnese		

International career
2002	Italy U16	3	(0)
2002–2003	Italy U17	14	(0)
2004	Italy U18	5	(0)
2004–2005	Italy U19	12	(0)
- * Club domestic league appearances and goals

Fabio Virgili (born 26 April 1986) is an Italian former professional footballer who played as a goalkeeper.

== Club career ==
Born in Terni, Umbria, Virgili started his professional career at Emilia–Romagna club Parma. In the summer of 2005, he left the Primavera Youth Team and joined Serie C1 side Napoli in a four-year co-ownership deal, for a peppercorn fee of €500; he won the league title with the club as an unused squad member, earning promotion to Serie B. In June 2006, he was bought back by Parma for €50,000 and became the club's third goalkeeper behind Luca Bucci and Alfonso De Lucia. He made his single appearance for the club that season in the second leg of the Coppa Italia quarter-final, in which Parma drew 2–2 with A.S. Roma, who won 4–3 on aggregate and went on to win the competition. In the next season, he was the backup of Bucci and Nicola Pavarini, along with Radek Petr and Eros Corradini.

In July 2008, he joined Carpenedolo along with Parma team-mate Thomas Som. Although he played as a regular starter for the Lega Pro Seconda Divisione side, he joined hometown club Sporting Terni in August 2009.

On 19 August 2010, he was signed by Paganese. The following season he was signed by Ternana Calcio, as the backup of Stefano Ambrosi, along with Carlo Camilli.

In the summer of 2012 he left Ternana Calcio and joined Botev Vratsa in the Bulgarian Second Division, but he never played for the club, and in March 2013 he returned in Italy to play with Narnese.

== International career ==
Virgili was an unused member of Italy U20 team at 2005 FIFA World Youth Championship. Along with Daniele Padelli, they were Emiliano Viviano's backup. He was the first choice goalkeeper at 2003 UEFA European Under-17 Football Championship, ahead Giacomo Bindi. He also capped at 2005 UEFA European Under-19 Football Championship elite qualification, ahead Davide Petrachi.

== Honours ==
Botev Vratsa

- Lega Pro Prima Divisione: 2012

Narnese

- Eccellenza Umbra: 2013
