= Alex Valentini =

Italian footballer (born 1988)

Personal information
- Date of birth: 5 April 1988 (age 38)
- Place of birth: Guastalla, Italy
- Height: 1.86 m (6 ft 1 in)
- Position: Goalkeeper

Youth career
- Mantova

Senior career*
Years	Team	Apps	(Gls)
2007–2010	Mantova	0	(0)
2007–2009	→ Sambonifacese (loan)	55	(0)
2010	→ Pro Sesto (loan)	14	(0)
2010–2013	Pro Vercelli	77	(0)
2013–2017	Spezia	4	(0)
2014–2015	→ Cittadella (loan)	23	(0)
2015–2016	→ Lugano (loan)	11	(0)
2017–2018	Vicenza	37	(0)
2018–2021	Triestina	21	(0)
2019	→ Viterbese (loan)	17	(0)
2019–2020	→ Alessandria (loan)	29	(0)
2021–2024	Pro Vercelli	21	(0)
2024	Crotone	1	(0)
- * Club domestic league appearances and goals as of 5 May 2024

Alex Valentini (born 5 April 1988) is an Italian footballer who plays as a goalkeeper.

== Career ==
=== Mantova ===
Born in Guastalla, Emilia-Romagna, Valentini started his career at Mantua, Lombardy, about 30 km (19 mi) away. Primary a youth team player, he was assigned number 88 shirt of the first team in 2006–07 Serie B season. He was loaned to Sambonifacese and won the promotion playoffs of 2007–08 Serie D. The club then signed him in co-ownership deal. In June 2009, he was bought back from the San Bonifacio based club. Since returned to Mantova, he was selected to Italy under-21 Serie B representative team twice, for internal friendlies, both as white team keeper against the blue team. In January 2010, he was loaned to Pro Sesto.

=== Pro Vercelli ===
After Mantova went bankrupt, he was signed by Pro Belvedere Vercelli (and later merged with Pro Vercelli to become FC Pro Vercelli 1892) He was the first choice of the team, ahead Marzio Dan who was the first choice for PB Vercelli in the last season.

=== Spezia ===
Valentini joined Spezia in August 2013 in a co-ownership deal. In June 2014 Spezia signed Valentini outright, with Danilo Russo moved to opposite direction.

After Spezia acquired Valentini outright, he left the club on loan for two seasons.

In summer 2017 Valentini finally left the club permanently.

=== Vicenza ===
On 27 July 2017 Valentini joined Vicenza on a two-year contract.

=== Triestina ===
After being released by Vicenza, on 26 June 2018 he joined Triestina.

On 30 January 2019, he joined Viterbese on loan.

On 4 July 2019, he moved on loan to Alessandria.

=== Return to Pro Vercelli ===
On 22 October 2021, he returned to Pro Vercelli as a free agent.

=== Crotone ===
On 25 January 2024, Valentini signed with Crotone until the end of the 2023–24 season.
