= 2006 UEFA European Under-19 Championship =

2006 UEFA Under-19 Championship
Mistrzostwa Europy U-19 w Piłce Nożnej 2006

Tournament details
- Host country: Poland
- Dates: 18–29 July
- Teams: 8

Final positions
- Champions: Spain (6th title)
- Runners-up: Scotland

Tournament statistics
- Matches played: 15
- Goals scored: 63 (4.2 per match)
- Attendance: 55,000 (3,667 per match)
- Top scorer(s): (Spain) Alberto Bueno (Turkey) İlhan Parlak (5 goals)
- Best player: (Spain) Alberto Bueno

The UEFA European Under-19 Championship 2006 Final Tournament was held in Poland between 18 July and 29 July 2006. The top three teams in each group qualified for the 2007 FIFA U-20 World Cup. Players born after 1 January 1987 were allowed to participate in this competition.

== Qualifications ==
There were two separate rounds of qualifications held before the Final Tournament.

1. 2006 UEFA European Under-19 Championship qualification
2. 2006 UEFA European Under-19 Championship elite qualification

== Teams ==
The following teams had qualified for the tournament:

- Austria
- Belgium
- Czech Republic
- Poland (host)
- Portugal
- Scotland
- Spain
- Turkey

== Group stage ==
=== Group A ===
Teams	Pld	W	D	L	GF	GA	GD	Pts
Czech Republic	3	2	0	1	7	5	+2	6
Austria	3	2	0	1	6	4	+2	6
Poland	3	1	0	2	4	4	0	3
Belgium	3	1	0	2	6	10	−4	3

18 July 2006
18:00 CET

Belgium	4–2	Czech Republic
Lamah 12', 32' (pen.); Švec 36' (o.g.); Mirallas 57'	Report	Fenin 14'; Střeštík 84'

Stadion Miejski, Pobiedziska
Attendance: 1,200
Referee: Novo Panić (Bosnia and Herzegovina)
18 July 2006
20:00 CET

Poland	0–1	Austria
	Report	Hoffer 75'

Stadion Miejski, Poznań
Attendance: 15,000
Referee: Hervé Piccirillo (France)

20 July 2006
18:00 CET

Austria	1–3	Czech Republic
Hoffer 76'	Report	Mareš 34' (pen.); Janda 37'; Střeštík 49'

Stadion Miejski, Swarzędz
Attendance: 2,800
Referee: Cristian Balaj (Romania)
20 July 2006
20:00 CET

Poland	4–1	Belgium
Janczyk 10', 43', 58'; Michalak 89'	Report	Lamah 62'

Stadion Amiki, Wronki
Attendance: 2,500
Referee: Ivan Bebek (Croatia)

23 July 2006
20:00 CET

Czech Republic	2–0	Poland
Střeštík 43'; Fenin 82'	Report

Stadion Dyskobolii, Grodzisk Wielkopolski
Attendance: 4,500
Referee: Jonas Eriksson (Sweden)
23 July 2006
20:00 CET

Austria	4–1	Belgium
Hoffer 16', 54'; Madl 82'; Gramann 86' (pen.)	Report	Moia 51'

Stadion Amiki, Wronki
Attendance: 1,500
Referee: Kristinn Jakobsson (Iceland)

=== Group B ===
Teams	Pld	W	D	L	GF	GA	GD	Pts
Spain	3	2	1	0	10	4	+6	7
Scotland	3	1	1	1	5	8	−3	4
Portugal	3	0	3	0	7	7	0	3
Turkey	3	0	1	2	9	12	−3	1

18 July 2006
18:00 CET

Spain	5–3	Turkey
Bueno 18'; Mata 32', 37', 90+2'; Calvo 53'	Report	Parlak 27', 61'; Erdinç 64'

Stadion Dyskobolii, Grodzisk Wielkopolski
Attendance: 1,800
Referee: Kristinn Jakobsson (Iceland)
18 July 2006
18:00 CET

Scotland	2–2	Portugal
Fletcher 10'; Grant 29'	Report	Cameron 72' (o.g.); Gama 78'

Stadion Miejski, Szamotuły
Attendance: 2,500
Referee: Cristian Balaj (Romania)

20 July 2006
18:00 CET

Scotland	0–4	Spain
	Report	Bueno 17'; Piqué 27', 51'; Suárez 86'

Stadion Miejski, Pobiedziska
Attendance: 1,200
Referee: Jonas Eriksson (Sweden)
20 July 2006
18:00 CET

Portugal	4–4	Turkey
Barbosa 7'; Tavares 31', 49'; Gama 73' (pen.)	Report	Parlak 33', 68', 90+5'; Erdinç 71'

Stadion Miejski, Szamotuły
Attendance: 2,000
Referee: Novo Panić (Bosnia and Herzegovina)

23 July 2006
18:00 CET

Portugal	1–1	Spain
Gama 21' (pen.)	Report	Díaz 47'

Stadion Miejski, Pobiedziska
Attendance: 1,500
Referee: Hervé Piccirillo (France)
23 July 2006
18:00 CET

Turkey	2–3	Scotland
Cafercan 68', 72' (pen.)	Report	Parlak 42' (o.g.); McGlinchey 45+1'; Fletcher 63'

Stadion Miejski, Swarzędz
Attendance: 2,800
Referee: Ivan Bebek (Croatia)

== Knockout stage ==
Semi-finals
26 July – Grodzisk Wielkopolski
Czech Republic	0
Scotland	1
26 July – Wronki
Spain	5
Austria	0

Final
29 July – Poznań
Scotland	1
Spain	2

== Semi-finals ==
26 July 2006
18:30 CET

Czech Republic	0–1	Scotland
	Report	Elliot 47'

Stadion Dyskobolii, Grodzisk Wielkopolski
Attendance: 1,000
Referee: Hervé Piccirillo (France)

26 July 2006
15:30 CET

Spain	5–0	Austria
Jeffrén 34'; García 42', 80'; Mata 72'; Bueno 88'	Report

Stadion Amiki, Wronki
Attendance: 1,500
Referee: Jonas Eriksson (Sweden)

== Final ==
29 July 2006
20:00 CET

Scotland	1–2	Spain
Dorrans 87'	Report	Bueno 51', 71'

Stadion Miejski, Poznań
Attendance: 13,200
Referee: Kristinn Jakobsson (Iceland)

=== Teams ===
SCOTLAND :
GK	1	Andrew McNeil
RB	2	Andrew Cave-Brown
CB	6	Scott Cuthbert (c)
CB	19	Jamie Adams
LB	3	Lee Wallace
RM	7	Simon Ferry
CM	16	Greg Cameron	(substituted off) 74'
CM	4	Charles Grant
CM	15	Ryan Conroy	(substituted off) 78'
LM	10	Michael McGlinchey
CF	8	Calum Elliot
Substitutes:
GK	12	Scott Fox
DF	18	Mark Reynolds
DF	5	Garry Kenneth
MF	17	Brian Gilmour	(substituted on) 78'
FW	14	Graham Dorrans	(substituted on) 74'
Manager:
Archie Gemmill & Tommy Wilson

SPAIN:
GK	1	Antonio Adán
CB	2	Antonio Barragán
CB	4	Marc Valiente
CB	5	Gerard Piqué
RWB	6	Mario Suárez
CM	7	Toni Calvo	(substituted off) 71'
CM	8	Javi García
CM	11	Diego Capel	(substituted off) 86'
LWB	12	Roberto Canella
CF	16	Juan Mata
CF	18	Alberto Bueno
Substitutes:
DF	3	José Ángel Crespo
DF	9	César Díaz
MF	10	Esteban Granero	(substituted on) 86'
GK	13	Ángel Bernabé
FW	14	Marc Pedraza
FW	15	Jeffrén	(substituted on) 71'
FW	17	Gorka Elustondo
Manager:
Ginés Meléndez

2006 UEFA U-19 European champions

Spain
Sixth title

== Goalscorers ==
5 goals

- (Spain) Alberto Bueno
- (Turkey) İlhan Parlak

4 goals

- (Austria) Erwin Hoffer
- (Spain) Juan Mata

3 goals

- (Czech Republic) Marek Střeštík
- (Poland) Dawid Janczyk
- (Belgium) Roland Lamah
- (Portugal) Bruno Gama

Source: uefa.com

== Qualification to U-20 World Cup ==
The six best performing teams qualified for the 2007 FIFA U-20 World Cup.

- Austria
- Czech Republic
- Poland (host)
- Portugal
- Scotland
- Spain
