= Bryan Reyna =

Peruvian footballer (born 1998

Personal information
- Full name: Roberto Bryan Reyna Casaverde
- Date of birth: 23 August 1998 (age 28)
- Place of birth: Lima, Peru
- Height: 1.72 m (5 ft 8 in)
- Position: Left winger

Team information
- Current team: Universitario de Deportes
- Number: 77

Youth career
- 2013: Sport Boys
- 2013–2016: Academia Cantolao
- 2016–2017: Mallorca

Senior career*
Years	Team	Apps	(Gls)
2017–2021	Mallorca	11	(0)
2017-2018	→ Toledo (loan)	9	(0)
2018–2019	→ Alcoyano (loan)	30	(0)
2019-2020	→ Barakaldo (loan)	11	(1)
2020-2021	→ Las Rozas (loan)	9	(1)
2021–2022	Academia Cantolao	49	(9)
2023–2024	Alianza Lima	16	(4)
2024–	Belgrano	44	(5)
2026–	→ Universitario de Deportes (loan)	8	(0)

International career^{‡}
2014–2015	Peru U17	?	(0)
2016–2017	Peru U20	8	(0)
2022–	Peru	20	(2)
- * Club domestic league appearances and goals as of 18:05, 3 October 2026 (UTC) ‡ National team caps and goals as of 23:22, 10 October 2025 (UTC)

Roberto Bryan Reyna Casaverde (born 23 August 1998) is a Peruvian professional footballer who plays as an attacking midfielder and left winger for Universitario de Deportes, on loan from Argentine Primera División club Belgrano and the Peru national team.

== Club career ==
=== Early career ===
Born in Lima and raised in Callao's Ventanilla District, Reyna first began by playing in the youth divisions of Sport Boys in 2013, then he joined to Academia Deportiva Cantolao. In 2015, he went on trials with the Argentine club Lanús and later with the Spanish side RCD Mallorca. Both teams showed interest in having him but finally he decided to accept the RCD Mallorca's offer.

=== RCD Mallorca ===
Reyna joined RCD Mallorca in June 2016 but due to document issues he had to wait until February 2017 to sign a two-year contract. He played with RCD Mallorca youth team in the División de Honor Juvenil de Fútbol during the second half of the 2016–17 season.

In July 2017, he was part of RCD Mallorca first team's pre-season under the orders of coach Vicente Moreno playing several friendly matches and even scoring a goal. Reyna made his official debut with RCD Mallorca in a 1–0 away win against CF Peralada on 20 August 2017, and completed a total of 11 appearances until the winter break of the 2017–18 Segunda División B.

On 3 October 2017, Mallorca announced a contract extension with Reyna until 30 June 2021.

==== Loans to Toledo, Alcoyano, Barakaldo and Las Rozas ====
In January 2018, he was loaned to Toledo until the end of the 2017–18 season.

In July 2018, he joined to Alcoyano, also on loan from Mallorca, for all the 2018–19 season. In this season he went on to make thirty appearances with his side in the Segunda División B.

The beginning of the 2019–20 season saw Reyna go on loan to Barakaldo, in principle, for the entire season. However, the loan was interrupted during the winter break at the request of the footballer himself due to the few minutes played with Barakaldo. He was then loaned by Mallorca to Las Rozas for the rest of the 2019–20 season. Reyna scored his first official goals with these two teams, the first one with Barakaldo against Calahorra on 20 October 2019, and the second with Las Rozas against Celta de Vigo B on 25 January 2020.

==== Return to RCD Mallorca (B) and departure ====
Reyna returned to RCD Mallorca for the 2020–21 season. He participated in the first team's pre-season and played a friendly match under the orders of coach Luis García Plaza. However, he ended up being sent to the RCD Mallorca B, the RCD Mallorca's reserve team.

In January 2021, Reyna was sacked from RCD Mallorca after he was intervened for breaching the curfew that was in force in Spain during the COVID-19 pandemic.

=== Return to Academia Cantolao ===
In March 2021, Reyna signed a three-years contract deal with his home club Academia Cantolao, which had been playing in the Peruvian Primera División for 4 years since its promotion in 2016, He made twenty–one appearances and scored three goals during the 2021 season. In the 2022 season, he made 28 appearances and scored 6 goals.

=== Alianza Lima ===
In December 2022, it was confirmed that Reyna had been sold to Alianza Lima, signing a deal until the end of 2025. He scored 4 goals in 16 Appearances with the Peruvian Club in the 2023 Season. In January 2024, he would join Club Atlético Belgrano in the Argentine League.

== International career ==
=== Youth teams ===
During his stay at Academia Cantolao in 2014, Reyna was observed by the coach of Peru U17 at the time, Juan José Oré, in order to integrate him into the team that was preparing for the 2015 South American U-17 Championship. Eventually, Reyna was part of Peru's U17 squad in that tournament held in Paraguay in March 2015.

He was also part of Peru U20 squad in the 2017 South American U-20 Championship that took place in Ecuador in January and February 2017.

=== Senior team ===
Reyna was included in a Peru national team's alternative list by the coach Juan Reynoso on 9 September 2022. However, he was called up to the main squad officially on 17 September 2022, to replace Andy Polo who had been dismissed due to an injury.

He made his international debut in a friendly match against El Salvador on 27 September 2022. He also scored his first international goal in the 81st minute of this match which ended with a 4–1 victory for Peru.

== Career statistics ==
=== Club ===
As of match played 28 September 2025

Appearances and goals by club, season, and competition
Club	Season	League			Cup		Continental		Other		Total	
Club	Season	Division	Apps	Goals	Apps	Goals	Apps	Goals	Apps	Goals	Apps	Goals
Mallorca	2017–18	Segunda División B	11	0	0	0	—		—		11	0
Toledo (loan)	2017–18	Segunda División B	9	0	—		—		—		9	0
Alcoyano (loan)	2018–19	Segunda División B	30	0	—		—		—		30	0
Barakaldo (loan)	2019–20	Segunda División B	11	1	—		—		—		11	1
Las Rozas (loan)	2019–20	Segunda División B	9	1	—		—		—		9	1
Mallorca B	2020–21	Tercera Federación	6	1	—		—		—		6	1
Academia Cantolao	2021	Peruvian Primera División	21	3	0	0	—		—		21	3
Academia Cantolao	2022	Peruvian Primera División	28	6	0	0	—		—		28	6
Academia Cantolao	Total		49	9	0	0	—		—		49	9
Alianza Lima	2023	Peruvian Primera División	26	4	0	0	6 (Note: Appearances in Copa Libertadores)	0	—		32	4
Belgrano	2024	Argentine Primera División	25	5	1	0	8 (Note: Appearances in Copa Sudamericana)	0	0	0	33	5
Belgrano	2025	Argentine Primera División	17	0	3	0	0	0	0	0	20	0
Belgrano	Total		42	5	4	0	8	0	0	0	53	5
Career total			194	21	4	0	14	0	0	0	210	21

=== International ===
As of match played on 10 October 2025

Appearances and goals by national team and year
National team	Year	Apps	Goals
Peru	2022	3	1
Peru	2023	6	1
Peru	2024	7	0
Peru	2025	4	0
Total		20	2

No.	Date	Venue	Opponent	Score	Result	Competition
1.	27 September 2022	Audi Field, Washington D.C., United States	El Salvador	3–1	4–1	Friendly
2.	16 June 2023	Busan Asiad Main Stadium. Busan, South Korea	South Korea	1–0	1–0	Friendly
