= Nicola Barasso =

Italian footballer

Personal information
- Date of birth: 21 November 1981 (age 44)
- Place of birth: Castellammare di Stabia, Italy
- Position: Goalkeeper

Senior career*
Years	Team	Apps	(Gls)
1999–2001	Genoa	0	(0)
1999–2000	→ Ebolitana (loan)	24	(0)
2001–2002	Mestre	16	(0)
2002–2007	Genoa	27	(0)
2007	→ Taranto (loan)	15	(0)
2007–2012	Taranto	43	(0)

International career
2001	Italy U-20	7	(0)
- * Club domestic league appearances and goals

Nicola Barasso (born 21 November 1981) is an Italian footballer who plays as a goalkeeper.

== Club career ==
=== Genoa ===
Born in Castellammare di Stabia, the Province of Naples, Barasso started his career at Genoa. He was loaned to Serie D side Ebolitana in 1999–2000 season, which the team relegated. In 2001, he was farmed to Mestre in co-ownership deal. That season he played half of the matches. In June 2002, Genoa bought back Barasso.

He then became a backup keeper for Genoa for almost 5 seasons. He won the promotion to Serie A in 2005 but followed the team relegated to Serie C1 after the team was accused to manipulate the result of the last match of 2004–05 Serie B. He had worked for Alessio Scarpi, Massimo Gazzoli and Rubinho as understudy and in January 2007 loaned to Taranto. Before leaving Genoa, he wore no.1 shirt. Genoa finished as the third of 2006–07 Serie B and direct promoted as it had a 10 points gap with Piacenza.

=== Taranto ===
With Taranto, he was the starting keeper and finished as the losing semi-finalists of the promotion playoffs. In July he returned to Taranto in another co-ownership deal. He lost his starting place in 2007–08 Serie C1 season (shared with Davide Faraon), despite Taranto bought the remain 50% registration rights from Genoa on 26 June 2008 by submitted a higher bid the Genoa to Lega Calcio. Since 2009–10 season he was the understudy of Nicolás Bremec and previously Emanuele Nordi. He signed a new contract in October 2009. On 17 October 2010 he was expelled despite on the bench. he was suspended for 2 rounds along with Bremec and the team had to use Edoardo Goio. He then injured and returned to team in January Since December he was backed by Faraon.

== International career ==
Barasso was capped for the Italy under-20 team at the 2001 Toulon Tournament.
