= 2006 UEFA European Under-19 Championship elite qualification =

UEFA U-19 Championship 2006 (Elite Round) was the second round of qualifications for the Final Tournament of UEFA U-19 Championship 2006. Spain, England, and Czech Republic automatically qualified for this round. The winners of each group joined hosts Poland at the Final Tournament.

== Matches ==
=== Group 1 ===
Teams	GP	W	D	L	GF	GA	GD	Pts
Austria	3	3	0	0	4	1	3	9
Hungary	3	1	1	1	4	3	1	4
Russia	3	1	1	1	2	2	0	4
Slovenia	3	0	0	3	2	6	-4	0

27 May	Russia	1 - 1	Hungary	Althofen, Austria
	Slovenia	1 - 2	Austria	St. Veit an der Glan, Austria
29 May	Russia	0 - 1	Austria	St. Veit an der Glan, Austria
	Hungary	3 - 1	Slovenia	Althofen, Austria
31 May	Slovenia	0 - 1	Russia	Althofen, Austria
	Austria	1 - 0	Hungary	St. Veit an der Glan, Austria

=== Group 2 ===
Teams	GP	W	D	L	GF	GA	GD	Pts
Turkey	3	3	0	0	11	2	9	9
Slovakia	3	2	0	1	8	5	3	6
Georgia	3	1	0	2	4	12	-8	3
Republic of Ireland	3	0	0	3	5	9	-4	0

19 May	Republic of Ireland	2 - 3	Slovakia	Nitra, Slovakia
	Georgia	0 - 6	Turkey	Dubnica nad Váhom, Slovakia
21 May	Republic of Ireland	1 - 3	Turkey	Senec, Slovakia
	Slovakia	4 - 1	Georgia	Partizánske, Slovakia
23 May	Georgia	3 - 2	Republic of Ireland	Senec, Slovakia
	Turkey	2 - 1	Slovakia	Trnava, Slovakia

=== Group 3 ===
Teams	GP	W	D	L	GF	GA	GD	Pts
Scotland	3	2	1	0	5	3	2	7
France	3	1	2	0	5	1	4	5
Belarus	3	1	1	1	3	2	1	4
Bulgaria	3	0	0	3	1	8	-7	0

16 May 2006 15:30

France	4–0	Bulgaria
Benzema 58' (pen.), 59'; Ménez 72', 80'	Report

Traktor, Minsk, Belarus

16 May 2006 19:00

Scotland	2–1	Belarus
Snodgrass 9'; Elliot 68'	Report	Chukhley 62'

Gorodskoi, Borisov, Belarus

18 May 2006 15:30

Bulgaria	1–2	Scotland
Dimitrov 48'	Report	Fletcher 34', 90+2'

Traktor, Minsk, Belarus

18 May 2006 19:00

France	0–0	Belarus
	Report

Gorodskoi, Borisov, Belarus

20 May 2006 18:00

Scotland	1–1	France
Fletcher 67'	Report	Benzema 11'

Traktor, Minsk, Belarus

20 May 2006 19:00

Belarus	2–0	Bulgaria
Dashuk 18'; Khachaturyan 71'	Report

Gorodskoi, Borisov, Belarus

=== Group 4 ===
Teams	GP	W	D	L	GF	GA	GD	Pts
Czech Republic	3	2	0	1	5	1	4	6
Switzerland	3	2	0	1	4	2	2	6
Ukraine	3	2	0	1	5	4	1	6
Denmark	3	0	0	3	0	7	-7	0

24 May	Czech Republic	2 - 0	Denmark	Donetsk, Ukraine
	Switzerland	1 - 2	Ukraine	Donetsk, Ukraine
26 May	Czech Republic	3 - 0	Ukraine	Donetsk, Ukraine
	Denmark	0 - 2	Switzerland	Donetsk, Ukraine
28 May	Switzerland	1 - 0	Czech Republic	Donetsk, Ukraine
	Ukraine	3 - 0	Denmark	Donetsk, Ukraine

=== Group 5 ===
Teams	GP	W	D	L	GF	GA	GD	Pts
Portugal	3	2	0	1	5	3	2	6
Croatia	3	1	1	1	5	4	1	4
Israel	3	1	1	1	1	2	-1	4
Macedonia	3	0	2	1	3	5	-2	2

16 May	Israel	1 - 0	Portugal	Velika Gorica, Croatia
	Croatia	2 - 2	Macedonia	Samobor, Croatia
18 May	Israel	0 - 0	Macedonia	Zaprešić, Croatia
	Portugal	2 - 1	Croatia	Velika Gorica, Croatia
20 May	Croatia	2 - 0	Israel	Zaprešić, Croatia
	Macedonia	1 - 3	Portugal	Samobor, Croatia

=== Group 6 ===
Teams	GP	W	D	L	GF	GA	GD	Pts
Belgium	3	2	1	0	6	4	2	7
Serbia and Montenegro	3	1	1	1	3	5	-2	4
Northern Ireland	3	1	0	2	7	6	1	3
England	3	1	0	2	3	4	-1	3

18 May	England	1 - 2	Belgium	Tournai, Belgium
	Serbia and Montenegro	1 - 4	Northern Ireland	Ronse, Belgium
20 May	England	2 - 1	Northern Ireland	Tubize, Belgium
	Belgium	1 - 1	Serbia and Montenegro	Ronse, Belgium
22 May	Serbia and Montenegro	1 - 0	England	Tournai, Belgium
	Northern Ireland	2 - 3	Belgium	Tubize, Belgium

=== Group 7 ===
Teams	GP	W	D	L	GF	GA	GD	Pts
Spain	3	3	0	0	15	2	13	9
Germany	3	2	0	1	9	4	5	6
Sweden	3	1	0	2	4	7	-3	3
Cyprus	3	0	0	3	2	17	-15	0

26 May	Spain	4 - 0	Sweden	Callosa de Segura, Spain
	Germany	6 - 0	Cyprus	Torrevieja, Spain
28 May	Spain	8 - 1	Cyprus	Torrevieja, Spain
	Sweden	1 - 2	Germany	Callosa de Segura, Spain
30 May	Germany	1 - 3	Spain	Torrevieja, Spain
	Cyprus	1 - 3	Sweden	Callosa de Segura, Spain

== See also ==
- 2006 UEFA European Under-19 Championship
- 2006 UEFA European Under-19 Championship qualification
