= Marc Pedraza =

Spanish footballer

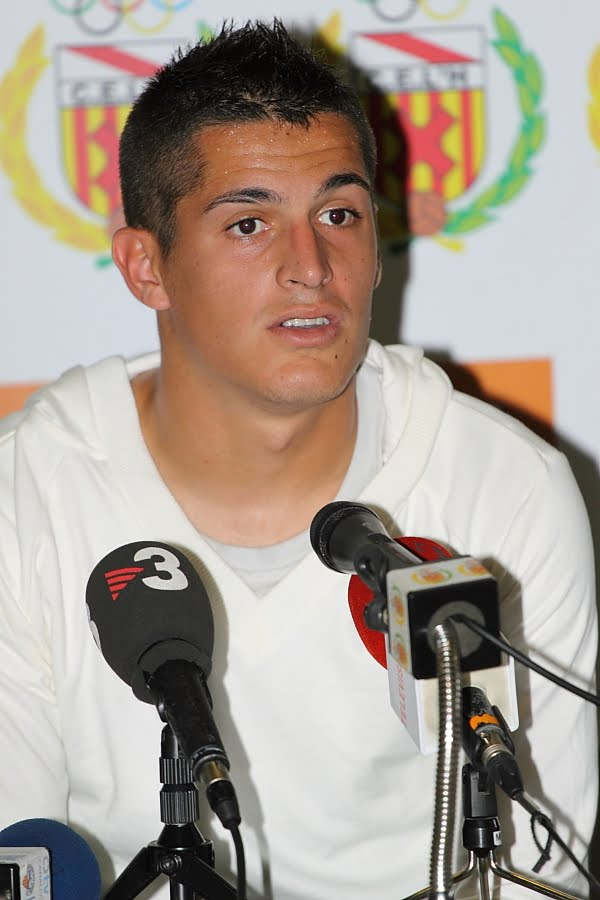
- Pedraza with Hospitalet in 2011

Personal information
- Full name: Marc Pedraza Sarto
- Date of birth: 6 February 1987 (age 39)
- Place of birth: Barcelona, Spain
- Height: 1.84 m (6 ft 1/2 in)
- Position: Midfielder

Youth career
- Barcelona
- 2002–2005: Espanyol

Senior career*
Years	Team	Apps	(Gls)
2003–2010	Espanyol B	156	(34)
2008–2010	Espanyol	1	(0)
2008	→ Alavés (loan)	14	(1)
2010–2013	Hospitalet	78	(6)
2013–2017	Numancia	94	(3)
2017–2020	Mallorca	70	(1)
2020–2022	Andorra	27	(0)
2022–2023	Hospitalet	9	(0)
Total		449	(45)

International career
2002	Spain U16	1	(0)
2004–2005	Spain U17	9	(3)
2006	Spain U19	5	(2)
- * Club domestic league appearances and goals

Marc Pedraza Sarto (born 6 February 1987) is a Spanish former professional footballer who played as a midfielder.

== Club career ==
Born in Barcelona, Catalonia, Pedraza was a product of local RCD Espanyol's academy. He spent three of his first four senior seasons with the B team in the Segunda División B, scoring ten goals in 2007–08 but also being relegated. The following year he upgraded to Segunda División and was loaned to Deportivo Alavés, appearing sparingly as the Basques also dropped down a tier; his first professional goal came on 18 October 2008, in a 4–1 home win over Real Murcia.

After returning, Pedraza continued to be mainly associated to the reserves. He played his first La Liga match with the main squad on 2 January 2010, coming on as a substitute for José Callejón in the last minute of a 1–0 away loss against Valencia CF.

Pedraza was released by Espanyol in summer 2010, but in October he signed with another club in his native region, third-division CE L'Hospitalet. He returned to the second tier after three full seasons, joining CD Numancia on a two-year contract.

On 28 July 2017, Pedraza agreed to a three-year deal at RCD Mallorca. Under manager Vicente Moreno, he was an undisputed starter as the side achieved two consecutive promotions, but took part in only three games in the 2019–20 campaign, being subsequently released.

Pedraza returned to division three on 12 August 2020, signing with FC Andorra, a club owned by Gerard Piqué. In July 2022, after helping in their first-ever promotion to the second tier, he returned to Hospitalet.

== Personal life ==
Pedraza's father, Ángel, was also a footballer. A defender and midfielder, he played professionally for FC Barcelona and Mallorca, going on to coach his son at Hospitalet in one match.

== Honours ==
Mallorca

- Segunda División B: 2017–18

Spain U19

- UEFA European Under-19 Championship: 2006
