= Nicolás Bremec =

Spanish-Uruguayan footballer (born 1977)

Personal information
- Full name: Nicolás Suárez Bremec
- Date of birth: 17 December 1977 (age 48)
- Place of birth: Barcelona, Spain
- Height: 1.90 m (6 ft 3 in)
- Position: Goalkeeper

Team information
- Current team: Lupa Roma
- Number: 22

Senior career*
Years	Team	Apps	(Gls)
1999	Defensor Sporting		
2000	Sud América	21	(0)
2001	Danubio		
2002	El Tanque Sisley	0	(0)
2002–2005	Carrarese	79	(0)
2005–2007	Arezzo	33	(0)
2007–2008	Ascoli	3	(0)
2008–2009	Foggia	33	(0)
2009–2012	Taranto	97	(0)
2012–2013	Grosseto	10	(0)
2013	→ Vicenza (loan)	19	(0)
2013–2014	Cremonese	18	(0)
2014–2015	Vicenza	22	(0)
2015–2016	Pro Sesto		
2017–	Lupa Roma	3	(0)
- * Club domestic league appearances and goals as of 7 February 2017 (UTC)

Nicolás Suárez Bremec (born 17 December 1977) is a Spanish-Uruguayan football goalkeeper who plays for Lupa Roma in Italy's Lega Pro.

== Career ==
Bremec was signed by Vicenza on 31 January 2013. In July 2013 Bremec returned to Grosseto for their pre-season camp.

On 19 July 2013 he was signed by Cremonese.

On 14 July 2014 he was re-signed by Vicenza.

== Career statistics ==
Club	Season	League	Domestic League		Domestic Cups		Continental Cups		Total	
Club	Season	League	Apps	Goals	Apps	Goals	Apps	Goals	Apps	Goals
Carrarese	2002–03	Serie C1	26	0	0	0	–	–	26	0
Carrarese	2003–04	Serie C2	15	0	0	0	–	–	15	0
Carrarese	2004–05	Serie C2	38	0	0	0	–	–	38	0
Arezzo	2005–06	Serie B	3	0	0	0	–	–	3	0
Arezzo	2006–07	Serie B	30	0	7	0	–	–	37	0
Ascoli	2007–08	Serie B	3	0	3	0	–	–	6	0
Foggia	2008–09	Serie C1	33	0	0	0	–	–	33	0
Taranto	2009–10	Serie C1	33	0	1	0	–	–	34	0
Taranto	2010–11	Serie C1	31	0	2	0	–	–	33	0
Taranto	2011–12	Serie C1	35	0	2	0	–	–	37	0
Total	Career		247	0	15	0	–	–	262	0
