= 2006 UEFA European Under-19 Championship qualification =

UEFA U-19 Championship 2006 (qualifying round) was the first round of qualifications for the Final Tournament of UEFA U-19 Championship 2006. Top two teams from each group and the best third-placed team entered the UEFA U-19 Championship 2006 (Elite Round).

== Matches ==
=== Group 1 ===
Team	Pld	W	D	L	GF	GA	GD	Pts
Georgia	3	2	1	0	6	2	+4	7
Slovenia	3	2	1	0	7	4	+3	7
Lithuania	3	1	0	2	3	5	−2	3
Estonia (H)	3	0	0	3	2	7	−5	0

Source: The Rec.Sport.Soccer Statistics Foundation
(H) Hosts

13 September	Lithuania	1–3	Georgia	Tallinn, Estonia
	Slovenia	4–2	Estonia	Tallinn, Estonia
15 September	Slovenia	1–1	Georgia	Tallinn, Estonia
	Estonia	0–1	Lithuania	Tallinn, Estonia
17 September	Lithuania	1–2	Slovenia	Tallinn, Estonia
	Georgia	2–0	Estonia	Tallinn, Estonia

=== Group 2 ===
Team	Pld	W	D	L	GF	GA	GD	Pts
Denmark	3	2	1	0	3	0	+3	7
Slovakia	3	2	1	0	3	1	+2	7
Liechtenstein (H)	3	1	0	2	2	4	−2	3
Kazakhstan	3	0	0	3	0	3	−3	0

Source: worldfootball.net
(H) Hosts

8 October	Slovakia	1–0	Kazakhstan	Eschen, Liechtenstein
	Denmark	2–0	Liechtenstein	Vaduz, Liechtenstein
10 October	Slovakia	2–1	Liechtenstein	Eschen, Liechtenstein
	Kazakhstan	0–1	Denmark	Vaduz, Liechtenstein
12 October	Denmark	0–0	Slovakia	Eschen, Liechtenstein
	Liechtenstein	1–0	Kazakhstan	Vaduz, Liechtenstein

=== Group 3 ===
Team	Pld	W	D	L	GF	GA	GD	Pts
Israel (H)	3	3	0	0	10	1	+9	9
Cyprus	3	2	0	1	3	4	−1	6
Norway	3	1	0	2	7	5	+2	3
Malta	3	0	0	3	1	11	−10	0

Source: worldfootball.net
(H) Hosts

2 November	Norway	6–0	Malta	Rishon LeZion, Israel
	Israel	3–0	Cyprus	Nes Ziona, Israel
4 November	Malta	0–3	Israel	Nes Ziona, Israel
	Norway	0–1	Cyprus	Rishon LeZion, Israel
6 November	Israel	4–1	Norway	Nes Ziona, Israel
	Cyprus	2–1	Malta	Rishon LeZion, Israel

The match between Israel and Cyprus has been forfeited.

=== Group 4 ===
Team	Pld	W	D	L	GF	GA	GD	Pts
Russia	3	3	0	0	7	0	+7	9
Portugal	3	2	0	1	8	2	+6	6
Luxembourg (H)	3	1	0	2	3	7	−4	3
Azerbaijan	3	0	0	3	2	11	−9	0

Source: worldfootball.net
(H) Hosts

27 September	Portugal	5–1	Azerbaijan	Beggen, Luxembourg
	Luxembourg	0–3	Russia	Berbourg, Luxembourg
29 September	Russia	3–0	Azerbaijan	Berbourg, Luxembourg
	Luxembourg	0–3	Portugal	Hesperange, Luxembourg
2 October	Azerbaijan	1–3	Luxembourg	Beggen, Luxembourg
	Portugal	0–1	Russia	Hesperange, Luxembourg

=== Group 5 ===
Team	Pld	W	D	L	GF	GA	GD	Pts
Sweden (H)	3	2	0	1	7	3	+4	6
Belgium	3	2	0	1	8	2	+6	6
Hungary	3	2	0	1	5	3	+2	6
Faroe Islands	3	0	0	3	2	14	−12	0

Source: worldfootball.net
(H) Hosts

5 October	Belgium	7–1	Faroe Islands	Lomma, Sweden
	Hungary	1–3	Sweden	Lund, Sweden
7 October	Faroe Islands	0–3	Hungary	Horby, Sweden
	Belgium	1–0	Sweden	Limhamn, Sweden
9 October	Hungary	1–0	Belgium	Staffanstorp, Sweden
	Sweden	4–1	Faroe Islands	Eslöv, Sweden

=== Group 6 ===
Team	Pld	W	D	L	GF	GA	GD	Pts
Republic of Ireland (H)	3	3	0	0	9	2	+7	9
Northern Ireland	3	1	1	1	3	3	0	4
Italy	3	1	1	1	3	4	−1	4
Moldova	3	0	0	3	1	7	−6	0

Source: The Rec.Sport.Soccer Statistics Foundation
(H) Hosts

16 October	Italy	2–0	Moldova	Midleton, Republic of Ireland
	Republic of Ireland	2–1	Northern Ireland	Cork, Republic of Ireland
18 October	Italy	0–0	Northern Ireland	Midleton, Republic of Ireland
	Moldova	0–3	Republic of Ireland	Cobh, Republic of Ireland
20 October	Republic of Ireland	4–1	Italy	Cork, Republic of Ireland
	Northern Ireland	2–1	Moldova	Cobh, Republic of Ireland

=== Group 7 ===
Team	Pld	W	D	L	GF	GA	GD	Pts
France (H)	3	3	0	0	8	1	+7	9
Austria	3	1	1	1	8	2	+6	4
Wales	3	1	1	1	6	4	+2	4
San Marino	3	0	0	3	1	16	−15	0

Source: The Rec.Sport.Soccer Statistics Foundation
(H) Hosts

24 October	Austria	8–0	San Marino	Limoges, France
	France	3–1	Wales	Limoges, France
26 October	Wales	0–0	Austria	Limoges, France
	France	3–0	San Marino	Limoges, France
28 October	Austria	0–2	France	Limoges, France
	San Marino	1–5	Wales	Limoges, France

=== Group 8 ===
Team	Pld	W	D	L	GF	GA	GD	Pts
Switzerland (H)	3	2	1	0	14	0	+14	7
Scotland	3	2	1	0	6	0	+6	7
Finland	3	1	0	2	6	3	+3	3
Andorra	3	0	0	3	0	23	−23	0

Source: The Rec.Sport.Soccer Statistics Foundation
(H) Hosts

7 October	Scotland	5–0	Andorra	Moutier, Switzerland
	Switzerland	2–0	Finland	Delémont, Switzerland
9 October	Switzerland	12–0	Andorra	Moutier, Switzerland
	Finland	0–1	Scotland	Delémont, Switzerland
11 October	Scotland	0–0	Switzerland	Delémont, Switzerland
	Andorra	0–6	Finland	Moutier, Switzerland

=== Group 9 ===
Team	Pld	W	D	L	GF	GA	GD	Pts
Turkey (H)	3	1	2	0	5	3	+2	5
Macedonia	3	1	2	0	6	4	+2	5
Romania	3	1	2	0	3	1	+2	5
Albania	3	0	0	3	2	8	−6	0

Source: worldfootball.net
(H) Hosts

23 October	Macedonia	4–2	Albania	Kuşadası, Turkey
	Turkey	1–1	Romania	Soke, Turkey
25 October	Albania	0–2	Turkey	Kuşadası, Turkey
	Macedonia	0–0	Romania	Soke, Turkey
27 October	Turkey	2–2	Macedonia	Kuşadası, Turkey
	Romania	2–0	Albania	Soke, Turkey

=== Group 10 ===
Team	Pld	W	D	L	GF	GA	GD	Pts
Germany (H)	3	2	1	0	11	6	+5	7
Belarus	3	1	1	1	4	7	−3	4
Greece	3	1	0	2	6	7	−1	3
Netherlands	3	0	2	1	4	5	−1	2

Source: The Rec.Sport.Soccer Statistics Foundation
(H) Hosts
14 October 2005 17:00

Netherlands	2–3	Greece
Sno 2'; Bruins 61'	Report	Papastathopoulos 31', 45'; Mitroglou 50'

Herford, Herford, Germany
Referee: Viktor Kassai (Hungary)

14 October 2005 20:00

Germany	6–2	Belarus
Amachaibou 24', 52'; Schönheim 26'; Ebert 45+1'; Toski 87'; Boateng 90+2' (pen.)	Report	Volkov 11'; Snapko 48'

Heidewald, Gütersloh, Germany
Referee: Daniel Stålhammar (Sweden)

17 October 2005 17:00

Netherlands	0–0	Belarus
	Report

Poststrasse, Verl, Germany
Referee: Novo Panić (Bosnia and Herzegovina)

17 October 2005 20:00

Greece	2–3	Germany
Mitroglou 14', 42'	Report	Hennings 23', 43'; Kunert 48'

Warendorf, Warendorf, Germany
Referee: Viktor Kassai (Hungary)

19 October 2005 20:00

Germany	2–2	Netherlands
Schönheim 61'; Kruska 86'	Report	Elia 36', 52' (pen.)

Wersestadion, Ahlen, Germany
Referee: Daniel Stålhammar (Sweden)

19 October 2005 20:00

Belarus	2–1	Greece
Gigevich 19', 29'	Report	Mitroglou 22'

Am Waldschlößchen, Lippstadt, Germany
Referee: Novo Panić (Bosnia and Herzegovina)

=== Group 11 ===
Team	Pld	W	D	L	GF	GA	GD	Pts
Croatia	3	2	1	0	8	2	+6	7
Bulgaria	3	2	1	0	3	0	+3	7
Iceland	3	1	0	2	4	4	0	3
Bosnia and Herzegovina (H)	3	0	0	3	0	9	−9	0

Source: worldfootball.net
(H) Hosts

3 October	Bulgaria	1–0	Iceland	Sarajevo, Bosnia and Herzegovina
	Croatia	5–0	Bosnia and Herzegovina	Sarajevo, Bosnia and Herzegovina
5 October	Iceland	2–3	Croatia	Sarajevo, Bosnia and Herzegovina
	Bulgaria	2–0	Bosnia and Herzegovina	Sarajevo, Bosnia and Herzegovina
7 October	Croatia	0–0	Bulgaria	Sarajevo, Bosnia and Herzegovina
	Bosnia and Herzegovina	0–2	Iceland	Sarajevo, Bosnia and Herzegovina

=== Group 12 ===
Team	Pld	W	D	L	GF	GA	GD	Pts
Serbia and Montenegro	3	2	1	0	3	0	+3	7
Ukraine	3	2	0	1	3	3	0	6
Latvia (H)	3	0	2	1	0	1	−1	2
Armenia	3	0	1	2	1	3	−2	1

Source: The Rec.Sport.Soccer Statistics Foundation
(H) Hosts

18 October	Serbia and Montenegro	1–0	Armenia	Riga, Latvia
	Ukraine	1–0	Latvia	Riga, Latvia
20 October	Armenia	1–2	Ukraine	Riga, Latvia
	Serbia and Montenegro	0–0	Latvia	Riga, Latvia
22 October	Ukraine	0–2	Serbia and Montenegro	Riga, Latvia
	Latvia	0–0	Armenia	Riga, Latvia

== 3rd Place table ==
The best third-placed team was determined by the results against the top two teams of the same group.

Grp	Team	Pld	W	D	L	GF	GA	GD	Pts
5	Hungary	2	1	0	1	2	3	−1	3
9	Romania	2	0	2	0	1	1	0	2
12	Latvia	2	0	1	1	0	1	−1	1
7	Wales	2	0	1	1	1	3	−2	1
6	Italy	2	0	1	1	1	4	−3	1
10	Greece	2	0	0	2	3	5	−2	0
11	Iceland	2	0	0	2	2	4	−2	0
1	Lithuania	2	0	0	2	2	5	−3	0
2	Liechtenstein	2	0	0	2	1	4	−3	0
8	Finland	2	0	0	2	0	3	−3	0
3	Norway	2	0	0	2	1	5	−4	0
4	Luxembourg	2	0	0	2	0	6	−6	0

Source: worldfootball.net

== See also ==
- 2006 UEFA European Under-19 Championship
- 2006 UEFA European Under-19 Championship elite qualification
