= Armando Pantanelli =

Italian footballer (born 1971)

Personal information
- Date of birth: 1 June 1971 (age 55)
- Place of birth: Turin, Italy
- Height: 1.84 m (6 ft 0 in)
- Position: Goalkeeper

Youth career
- 1986–1989: Reggiana

Senior career*
Years	Team	Apps	(Gls)
1989–1990	Reggiana	0	(0)
1992–1994	Olbia	35	(0)
1994–1996	Carpi	64	(0)
1996–1997	Inter	0	(0)
1997–1999	Reggiana	25	(0)
1997	→ Fidelis Andria (loan)	27	(0)
1999	Perugia	0	(0)
1999–2001	Cosenza	60	(0)
2001–2004	Cagliari	117	(0)
2004–2007	Catania	116	(0)
2007–2008	Avellino	23	(0)
2008–2010	Paganese	28	(0)
Total		495	(0)
- * Club domestic league appearances and goals

Armando Pantanelli (born 1 June 1971) is an Italian former professional football goalkeeper.

== Playing career ==
Born in Turin, Pantanelli spent his childhood in Parma, and began his footballing career with A.C. Reggiana, and from 1992 to 2006, he played for a host of other clubs, appearing in over 400 matches in the Serie C2, Serie C1, and Serie B, before making his Serie A debut in the 2006–07 season after Calcio Catania earned promotion to the premier division. After a feud with the club management, he moved to Avellino in the summer of 2007.

Pantanelli is famous for his mane of hair kept out of his eyes with a baseball cap rather than the conventional headband. He has also captained Catania on a number of occasions. He is also well respected for his remarkable reflex saves, as well as his ability to save penalties. He is, however, also known to have made some high-profile blunders. Pantanelli has been compared to another Italian goalkeeper, Marco Storari, for a similar style of goalkeeping, as well as hairstyle. Storari, ironically spent much of his career with Sicilian rivals Messina.

=== A.C. Reggiana ===
Pantanelli began his professional career with A.C. Reggiana 1919, in 1986. He spent 5 seasons playing within the club's youth system, and began to earn first team call-ups for the 1989–1990 Italian Lega Calcio season. He never earned a first team cap for the club, and was sold in July 1990 to Olbia Calcio.

=== Olbia Calcio – Carpi F.C. ===
Following his official transfer to Olbia Calcio, Pantanelli soon became a vital part of the team, as after a quiet first season, the goalkeeper eventually earned a starting position, and went on to make 35 league appearances up until his 1994 summer transfer to fellow Serie C side Carpi F.C. 1909. Upon his transfer, the young net-minder managed to instantly break into the club's starting XI, and in just two full seasons with the team, Pantanelli made a very impressive 68 appearances for the club, in all competitions. At the conclusion of the 1995–96 season, he transferred to Serie A giants Inter Milan, following his impressive displays in the lower divisions.

=== F.C. Internazionale Milano ===
Following his impending transfer to the northern Italian giants, Pantanelli was signed as a reserve goalkeeper, and spent the entire 1996–1997 Serie A campaign on the bench. Without ever making an appearance for the nerrazzurri, Pantanelli soon returned to the lower divisions, returning to former club A.C. Reggiana in the summer of 1997.

=== Return to Reggio Emilia ===
Following his adventure with the Milan side, he returned to his youth club, and was surprisingly sent out on loan upon his arrival. He was loaned to A.S. Andria BAT, and in less than a full season, the keeper made 27 appearances, maintaining a starting position. Following the expiration of the loan deal, the 26-year-old Pantanelli returned to Reggiana. In between 1997 and 1999, the shot-stopper managed just 25 appearances, and was again sold in the summer of 1999.

=== A.C. Perugia ===
At the conclusion of his second spell with the Emilia-Romagna based Reggiana, Pantanelli was sold to A.C. Perugia, in Serie A, where he was again utilized as a reserve keeper, never making his Serie A debut, or even making a league appearance for the club, in less than one season.

=== Cosenza Calcio 1914 ===
After another sub-par adventure in the Italian Serie A, Armando returned again to the lower divisions of the Lega Calcio, and joined Cosenza Calcio 1914 in 1999. It was here, where the goalie made a name for himself, and in just 2 seasons, he made over 65 appearances for the club, in all competitions, and was soon linked again to several Serie B clubs, and lesser Serie A clubs. With a hefty transfer link in the summer of 2001, he eventually moved to Sardinia with then-Serie B side Cagliari Calcio, for an undisclosed transfer fee.

=== Cagliari Calcio ===
With his permanent move to the club for the 2001–2002 Serie B season, Pantanelli instantly held down a guaranteed starting position, and eventually went on to make well-over 100 league appearances for the club, also appearing for the club in the Coppa Italia. He also helped to lead his team into the Serie A, but failed to make his Serie A debut, until the 2006–2007 Serie A season, with Sicilian giants, Calcio Catania. After spending 3 seasons in Sardinia with Cagliari, the 33-year-old keeper transferred to then-Serie B side, Calcio Catania.

=== Calcio Catania ===
Following his transfer to eastern Sicily in August 2004, and became the club's number goalkeeper, and eventually earned captaincy at the club. During his spell with the Sicilian giants, Pantanelli was an undisputed starter, ahead of Ciro Polito and Vitangelo Spadavecchia during the time. He led his club to promotion to the Serie A, following a 2nd-place finish in the Serie B 2005–06 season. During the 2006–2007 Serie A season, Pantanelli held down his starting place, but at the conclusion to the season, Pantanelli was involved in a controversy with the management of the club.

=== Catania Controversy ===
At the end of the 2006–2007 season Pantanelli was involved in a feud with Catania, accusing the club of bullying him into quitting the club by excluding him from training sessions and keeping him and two other players at a separate hotel at away games. In September 2007 he was allegedly implicated in a betting scandal. An inquest has been opened into betting involving Pantanelli, according to newspaper ‘La Sicilia’. It is alleged that he placed bets on two games that ended with a negative result for Catania, supposedly due to mistakes made by Pantanelli.

=== Later years ===
As he was sent off the first team roster, Pantanelli had to find a new club where to play to. In summer 2007 he then joined Serie B club Avellino, but he did not manage to return to his highs, and the biancoverdi were ultimately relegated to Lega Pro Prima Divisione that year, but were eventually placed back in Serie B to fill the void left by the bankrupt Messina, who ultimately were relegated to Serie D. He was successively released for free by Avellino, and then signed by Lega Pro Prima Divisione club Paganese.

== Coaching career ==
In 2011, he passed his category 2 coaching exam.
