= 2003–04 SSC Napoli season =

Napoli
2003–04 season
- Chairman: Salvatore Naldi
- Manager: Andrea Agostinelli; Luigi Simoni
- Serie B: 13th (relegated to Serie C1)
- Coppa Italia: Group stage
- Top goalscorer: Davide Dionigi (8)
Home colours	Away colours	Third colours

SSC Napoli endured a horror season in 2003–04 Serie B, relegated to Serie C by the end of the season. The target prior to the season was promotion to Serie A, and several experienced players were brought in to achieve that goal, among them Massimo Carrera, Renato Olive, Rubens Pasino and Gianluca Savoldi. Especially the signing of Savoldi was significant, since he is the son of legendary Napoli striker Giuseppe Savoldi. The club also lost its captain Roberto Stellone to Reggina.

Supporter Sergio Ercolano was killed when falling down from the stands at the derby with Avellino. That forced Napoli to play three home matches in front of an empty stadium. When coach Andrea Agostinelli was replaced by Luigi Simoni, Napoli at least salvaged a 13th place in the table, and looked set to stay in Serie B for the 2004–05 season.

That changed when it became apparent that president Salvatore Naldi could not fund the club any longer, which meant bankruptcy for the second time in the Neapolitan footballing history. By August 2004, Napoli was declared bankrupt. Film producer Aurelio De Laurentiis refounded Napoli under the name "Napoli Soccer", and were placed in the 2004–05 Serie C1.

== Squad ==
Note: Flags indicate national team as defined under FIFA eligibility rules; some limited exceptions apply. Players may hold more than one non-FIFA nationality.

No.	Pos.	Nation	Player
1	GK	ITA	Emanuele Manitta
2	DF	ITA	Alessandro Del Grosso
3	DF	ITA	Marco Zamboni
4	MF	POR	José Luís Vidigal
5	DF	ITA	Vittorio Tosto
6	MF	SCG	Marko Perović
7	FW	SUI	David Sesa
8	MF	ITA	Dario Marcolin
9	FW	ITA	Gianluca Savoldi
11	MF	BRA	Fábio César
12	GK	ITA	Andrea Argentati
13	DF	CRO	Mario Cvitanović
14	MF	ITA	Renato Olive
16	FW	ITA	Davide Dionigi (Vice-captain)
17	MF	ITA	Vincenzo Platone
18	FW	ITA	Nunzio Di Roberto
19	MF	ITA	Rubens Pasino
20	MF	ITA	Nicola Zanini
21	FW	AUS	Massimiliano Vieri
22	DF	ITA	Marco Quadrini
23	MF	ITA	Andrea Bernini

No.	Pos.	Nation	Player
24	MF	ITA	Cataldo Montesanto
25	DF	ITA	Luigi Piccirillo
26	FW	ITA	Raffaele Pianese
27	GK	ITA	Pierluigi Brivio
31	DF	ITA	Gaetano Avolio
36	DF	ITA	Michele Iorio
40	DF	ITA	Massimo Carrera
41	DF	ITA	Nicola Stroffolino
42	FW	ITA	Pasquale Iadaresta
49	MF	ITA	Francesco Rega
53	MF	ITA	Giuseppe Vitagliano
64	MF	ITA	Marcello D'Angelo
65	MF	ITA	Gennaro Esposito
77	DF	COL	Gonzalo Martínez
85	MF	ITA	Raffaele Corsale
86	GK	ITA	Giulio Coppola
87	GK	ITA	Raffaele Sorriso
90	DF	ITA	Daniele Portanova
91	DF	ITA	Mauro Bonomi
97	MF	ITA	Gennaro Sileno

=== Transfers ===
In
Pos.	Name	from	Type
GK	Andrea Argentati	Vigor Senigallia	
GK	Pierluigi Brivio	Genoa	
DF	Massimo Carrera	Atalanta	
DF	Mario Cvitanović	Genoa	
DF	Daniele Portanova	Messina	
DF	Sean Sogliano	Perugia	
DF	Vittorio Tosto	Piacenza	
DF	Marco Zamboni	Udinese	
MF	Andrea Bernini	Sampdoria	
MF	Cataldo Montesanto	Ascoli	
MF	Renato Olive	Bologna	
MF	Nicola Zanini	Como	
FW	Gianluca Savoldi	Reggina	
FW	Massimiliano Vieri	Juventus	

Out
Pos.	Name	To	Type
GK	Raffaele Gragnaniello	Giugliano	
GK	Francesco Mancini	Pisa	
DF	Francesco Baldini	Genoa	
DF	Antonio Bocchetti	Piacenza	
DF	Maurizio D'Angelo	Chievo	
DF	Abdelilah Saber	Torino	
DF	Alberto Savino	Ternana	
DF	Mariano Stendardo	Taranto	
DF	Emanuele Troise	Bologna	
DF	Matteo Villa	Genoa	
MF	Gonzalo Martínez	Udinese	
FW	Carlos Pavón	Monarcas Morelia	
FW	Roberto Stellone	Reggina	

==== Winter ====
In
Pos.	Name	from	Type
DF	Alessandro Del Grosso	Catania	
MF	Gonzalo Martínez	Udinese	
MF	Marko Perović	Ancona	

Out
Pos.	Name	To	Type
DF	Massimo Russo	Giugliano	
DF	Sean Sogliano	Ancona	
MF	Francesco Montervino	Catania	
MF	Vincenzo Platone	Teramo	
FW	Antonio Floro Flores	Sampdoria	

== Serie B ==
=== League table ===
Pos	Team	Pld	W	D	L	GF	GA	GD	Pts	Promotion or relegation
12	Torino	46	14	17	15	57	54	+3	59	
13	Vicenza	46	12	20	14	48	51	−3	56	
14	Napoli (Note: Folded after bankruptcy, new entity re-admitted to Serie C1 by Lodo Petrucci.) (E, R)	46	10	26	10	35	43	−8	56	Relegation to Serie C1
15	Treviso	46	12	19	15	48	51	−3	55	
16	Genoa	46	13	16	17	57	62	−5	55	

Source: Almanacco Illustrato del Calcio - La Storia 1898-2004, Panini Edizioni, Modena, September 2005
Rules for classification: 1) points; 2) head-to-head points; 3) head-to-head goal difference; 4) head-to-head goals scored; 5) goal difference; 6) number of goals scored.
(E) Eliminated; (R) Relegated

=== Results summary ===
Overall								Home						Away					
Pld	W	D	L	GF	GA	GD	Pts	W	D	L	GF	GA	GD	W	D	L	GF	GA	GD
46	10	26	10	35	44	−9	56	6	15	2	20	16	+4	4	11	8	15	28	−13

=== Results by round ===
Round	1	2	3	4	5	6	7	8	9	10	11	12	13	14	15	16	17	18	19	20	21	22	23	24	25	26	27	28	29	30	31	32	33	34	35	36	37	38	39	40	41	42	43	44	45	46
Ground	A	H	A	H	A	H	A	H	A	H	H	A	H	A	H	A	H	A	A	H	A	H	A	H	A	H	A	H	A	H	A	H	A	A	H	A	H	A	H	A	H	H	A	H	A	H
Result	D	L	D	D	L	D	D	D	W	D	D	D	D	L	W	D	W	D	L	D	D	D	L	D	L	W	W	W	D	D	L	W	L	W	W	D	D	D	D	W	D	L	L	D	D	D
Position	21	23	20	19	21	18	19	21	19	19	20	19	20	21	20	20	16	16	16	17	18	17	19	19	21	19	17	16	17	16	18	13	14	13	13	13	13	13	13	13	13	15	15	15	14	14

Source: Competitive matches
A = Away; H = Home; W = Win; D = Draw; L = Loss

=== Matches ===
7 September 2003 2	Napoli	0–1	Como	Naples
		Report	Bressan 78'	Stadium: Stadio San Paolo; Attendance: 20,038; Referee: Salvatore Racalbuto

11 September 2003 3	Messina	1–1	Napoli	Messina
	Sullo 88' (pen.)	Report	Zamboni 69'	Stadium: Stadio Giovanni Celeste; Attendance: 10,619; Referee: Luca Palanca

14 September 2003 4	Napoli	1–1	Piacenza	Naples
	Dionigi 14' (pen.)	Report	Riccio 42'	Stadium: Stadio San Paolo; Attendance: 20,564; Referee: Marco Gabriele

20 September 2003 5	Avellino	3–0 (Awarded)	Napoli	Avellino
				Stadium: Stadio Partenio; Referee: Luca Palanca

23 September 2003 1	Hellas Verona	1–1	Napoli	Verona
	Myrtaj 66' (pen.)	Report	Tosto 89'	Stadium: Stadio Marcantonio Bentegodi; Attendance: 13,091; Referee: Tiziano Pieri

27 September 2003 6	Napoli	1–1	Ascoli	Campobasso
	Savoldi 57' (pen.)	Report	G. Fontana 50' (pen.)	Stadium: Stadio Nuovo Romagnoli; Attendance: 0 Referee: Andrea De Marco

4 October 2003 7	Triestina	0–0	Napoli	Trieste
		Report		Stadium: Stadio Nereo Rocco; Attendance: 10,356; Referee: Danilo Nucini

12 October 2003 8	Napoli	0–0	Livorno	Campobasso
		Report		Stadium: Stadio Nuovo Romagnoli; Attendance: 0 Referee: Matteo Trefoloni

15 October 2003 9	Treviso	0–1	Napoli	Treviso
		Report	Zanini 61'	Stadium: Stadio Omobono Tenni; Attendance: 4,951; Referee: Paolo Bertini

18 October 2003 10	Napoli	1–1	Vicenza	Campobasso
	Zamboni 60' (pen.)	Report	Moscardi 8'	Stadium: Stadio Nuovo Romagnoli; Attendance: 0 Referee: Mauro Bergonzi

25 October 2003 11	Napoli	2–2	Torino	Campobasso
	Dionigi 6'; M. Vieri 60'	Report	Ferrante 11', 21'	Stadium: Stadio Nuovo Romagnoli; Attendance: 0 Referee: Paolo Bertini

2 November 2003 12	Cagliari	1–1	Napoli	Tempio Pausania
	Loria 81'	Report	Pasino 11'	Stadium: Stadio Nino Manconi; Attendance: 7,500; Referee: Andrea De Marco

9 November 2003 13	Napoli	0–0	Salernitana	Campobasso
		Report		Stadium: Stadio Nuovo Romagnoli; Attendance: 0 Referee: Luca Palanca

16 November 2003 14	Palermo	4–0	Napoli	Palermo
	Ferri 27'; Toni 37', 60'; Zauli 48'	Report		Stadium: Stadio Renzo Barbera; Attendance: 24,293; Referee: Salvatore Racalbuto

20 November 2003 15	Napoli	2–1	Ternana	Naples
	M. Vieri 7', 61'	Report	Borgobello 65' (pen.)	Stadium: Stadio San Paolo; Attendance: 23,071; Referee: Nicola Rizzoli

23 November 2003 16	Atalanta	0–0	Napoli	Bergamo
		Report		Stadium: Stadio Atleti Azzurri d'Italia; Attendance: 11,488; Referee: Gianluca Paparesta

30 November 2003 17	Napoli	1–0	Pescara	Naples
	Floro Flores 58'	Report		Stadium: Stadio San Paolo; Attendance: 25,278; Referee: Mauro Bergonzi

7 December 2003 18	Venezia	0–0	Napoli	Venice
		Report		Stadium: Stadio Pierluigi Penzo; Attendance: 4,233; Referee: Paolo Tagliavento

14 December 2003 19	Catania	1–0	Napoli	Catania
	Oliveira 51'	Report		Stadium: Stadio Angelo Massimino; Attendance: 9,055; Referee: Michele Cruciani

21 December 2003 20	Napoli	2–2	Fiorentina	Naples
	Zanini 77'; Tosto 90+1'	Report	Riganò 59' (pen.); Graffiedi 83'	Stadium: Stadio San Paolo; Attendance: 25,052; Referee: Paolo Dondarini

6 January 2004 21	Bari	0–0	Napoli	Bari
		Report		Stadium: Stadio San Nicola; Attendance: 5,008; Referee: Gianluca Rocchi

11 January 2004 22	Napoli	0–0	Genoa	Naples
		Report		Stadium: Stadio San Paolo; Attendance: 17,253; Referee: Massimiliano Saccani

18 January 2004 23	AlbinoLeffe	1–0	Napoli	Bergamo
	Possanzini 53'	Report		Stadium: Stadio Atleti Azzurri d'Italia; Attendance: 2,327; Referee: Diego Preschern

23 January 2004 24	Napoli	2–2	Hellas Verona	Naples
	Perović 26', 38'	Report	Salvetti 7'; Adaílton 67'	Stadium: Stadio San Paolo; Attendance: 15,772; Referee: Christian Brighi

1 February 2004 25	Como	2–0	Napoli	Como
	Carparelli 61', 80'	Report		Stadium: Stadio Giuseppe Sinigaglia; Attendance: 4,649; Referee: Nicola Rizzoli

8 February 2004 26	Napoli	1–0	Messina	Naples
	Zamboni 71'	Report		Stadium: Stadio San Paolo; Attendance: 13,700; Referee: Daniele Tombolini

15 February 2004 27	Piacenza	2–3	Napoli	Piacenza
	Beghetto 45+2' (pen.); Cacia 79'	Report	Tosto 42', 71'; Zanini 86'	Stadium: Stadio Leonardo Garilli; Attendance: 5,910; Referee: Nicola Rizzoli

22 February 2004 28	Napoli	1–0	Avellino	Naples
	Savoldi 52'	Report		Stadium: Stadio San Paolo; Attendance: 26,062; Referee: Paolo Dondarini

29 February 2004 29	Ascoli	1–1	Napoli	Ascoli Piceno
	Di Venanzio 62'	Report	Del Grosso 72'	Stadium: Stadio Cino e Lillo Del Duca; Attendance: 7,639; Referee: Emilio Pellegrino

4 March 2004 30	Napoli	0–0	Triestina	Naples
		Report		Stadium: Stadio San Paolo; Attendance: 24,394; Referee: Daniele Tombolini

7 March 2004 31	Livorno	3–0	Napoli	Livorno
	Protti 23', 36', 86'	Report		Stadium: Stadio Armando Picchi; Attendance: 10,405; Referee: Gianluca Paparesta

14 March 2004 32	Napoli	1–0	Treviso	Naples
	Dionigi 5'	Report		Stadium: Stadio San Paolo; Attendance: 14,192; Referee: Michele Cruciani

18 March 2004 33	Vicenza	1–0	Napoli	Vicenza
	Tamburini 79'	Report		Stadium: Stadio Romeo Menti; Attendance: 11,972; Referee: Salvatore Racalbuto

21 March 2004 34	Torino	1–2	Napoli	Turin
	Conticchio 68'	Report	Dionigi 45'; M. Vieri 87'	Stadium: Stadio delle Alpi; Attendance: 13,077; Referee: Diego Preschern

27 March 2004 35	Napoli	1–0	Cagliari	Naples
	Dionigi 72'	Report		Stadium: Stadio San Paolo; Attendance: 20,945; Referee: Stefano Cassarà

4 April 2004 36	Salernitana	0–0	Napoli	Salerno
		Report		Stadium: Stadio Arechi; Attendance: 15,697; Referee: Stefano Cassarà

10 April 2004 37	Napoli	1–1	Palermo	Naples
	Dionigi 28'	Report	A.Filippini 40'	Stadium: Stadio San Paolo; Attendance: 21,290; Referee: Pasquale Rodomonti

17 April 2004 38	Ternana	0–0	Napoli	Terni
		Report		Stadium: Stadio Libero Liberati; Attendance: 7,234; Referee: Oscar Girardi

24 April 2004 39	Napoli	0–0	Atalanta	Naples
		Report		Stadium: Stadio San Paolo; Attendance: 16,642; Referee: Christian Brighi

2 May 2004 40	Pescara	1–2	Napoli	Pescara
	D. Russo 78'	Report	Zanini 32'; Tosto 65'	Stadium: Stadio Adriatico; Attendance: 4,543; Referee: Andrea Romeo

8 May 2004 41	Napoli	1–1	Venezia	Naples
	Dionigi 54'	Report	Carrera 4' (o.g.)	Stadium: Stadio San Paolo; Attendance: 13,456; Referee: Stefano Cassarà

15 May 2004 42	Napoli	2–3	Catania	Naples
	Perović 52'; M. Vieri 82'	Report	Terra 27'; Berrettoni 37', 50'	Stadium: Stadio San Paolo; Attendance: 15,000; Referee: Andrea Romeo

22 May 2004 43	Fiorentina	2–1	Napoli	Florence
	Fontana 49'; Delli Carri 87'	Report	Dionigi 26'	Stadium: Stadio Artemio Franchi; Attendance: 23,154; Referee: Roberto Rosetti

29 May 2004 44	Napoli	0–0	Bari	Naples
		Report		Stadium: Stadio San Paolo; Attendance: 12,563; Referee: Diego Preschern

5 June 2004 45	Genoa	2–2	Napoli	Genoa
	Bjelanović 48'; Grieco 81' (pen.)	Report	Zanini 49' (pen.); Bernini 75'	Stadium: Stadio Luigi Ferraris; Attendance: 17,186; Referee: Alberto Castellani

12 June 2004 46	Napoli	0–0	AlbinoLeffe	Naples
		Report		Stadium: Stadio San Paolo; Attendance: 10,605; Referee: Andrea Romeo
