= Coverciano =

Coverciano may refer to:

- Coverciano, Florence, a neighbourhood of Florence
- Centro Tecnico Federale di Coverciano, the training ground in Coverciano for the Italy national team
