= Italian Football Hall of Fame =

Hall of fame for association football players

- Sport: Association football
- Competition: Italian football
- Awarded for: Football personalities that had an unforgettable impact on the history of Italian football
- Local name: Hall of Fame del calcio italiano (Italian)
- Country: Italy
- Presented by: Italian Football Federation; Football Museum Foundation

History
- First award: 2011
- Editions: 12
- Final award: 2023
- Website: Official website

The Italian Football Hall of Fame (Italian: Hall of Fame del calcio italiano) is the hall of fame for association football players that have had a significant impact on Italian football.

It is housed at the Museo del Calcio in Coverciano, Italy.

== History and regulations ==
The Hall of Fame was established by the Italian Football Federation (FIGC) and Football Museum Foundation (Italian: Fondazione Museo del Calcio) in 2011 to celebrate football personalities that "had an unforgettable impact on the history of Italian football". It aims to promote the heritage, history, culture and values of Italian football.

Since 2011, new members are added every year and are divided into categories: Italian player (retired for at least two seasons), Italian coach (with at least 15 years of activity), Italian veteran (retired for at least 25 years), Foreign player (retired for at least two seasons and that has played in Italy for at least five seasons), Italian referee (retired for at least two seasons), Italian director (with at least 15 years of activity), and Posthumous honours. In the 2022 selection, a non-Italian coach, José Mourinho, was inducted.

The jury listed in the Italian Football Federation website is composed of the directors of the main Italian sporting press bodies, including: Luigi Ferrajolo (President of Italian Sports Press Association), Andrea Monti (La Gazzetta dello Sport), Alessandro Vocalelli (Corriere dello Sport – Stadio and Guerin Sportivo), Paolo De Paola (Tuttosport), Gabriele Romagnoli (Rai Sport), Federico Ferri (Sky Sport), Matteo Marani (Sky Sport 24), Alberto Brandi (Sport Mediaset), and Piercarlo Presutti (Agenzia Nazionale Stampa Associata). However, a different jury composition has been used in different editions.

In 2014, the category Female Italian player was added. In 2018, the Fair Play Award category was added in honour of the late Italian footballer Davide Astori. The same year, a Special Award was awarded to Gianni Brera.

== List of inductees ==
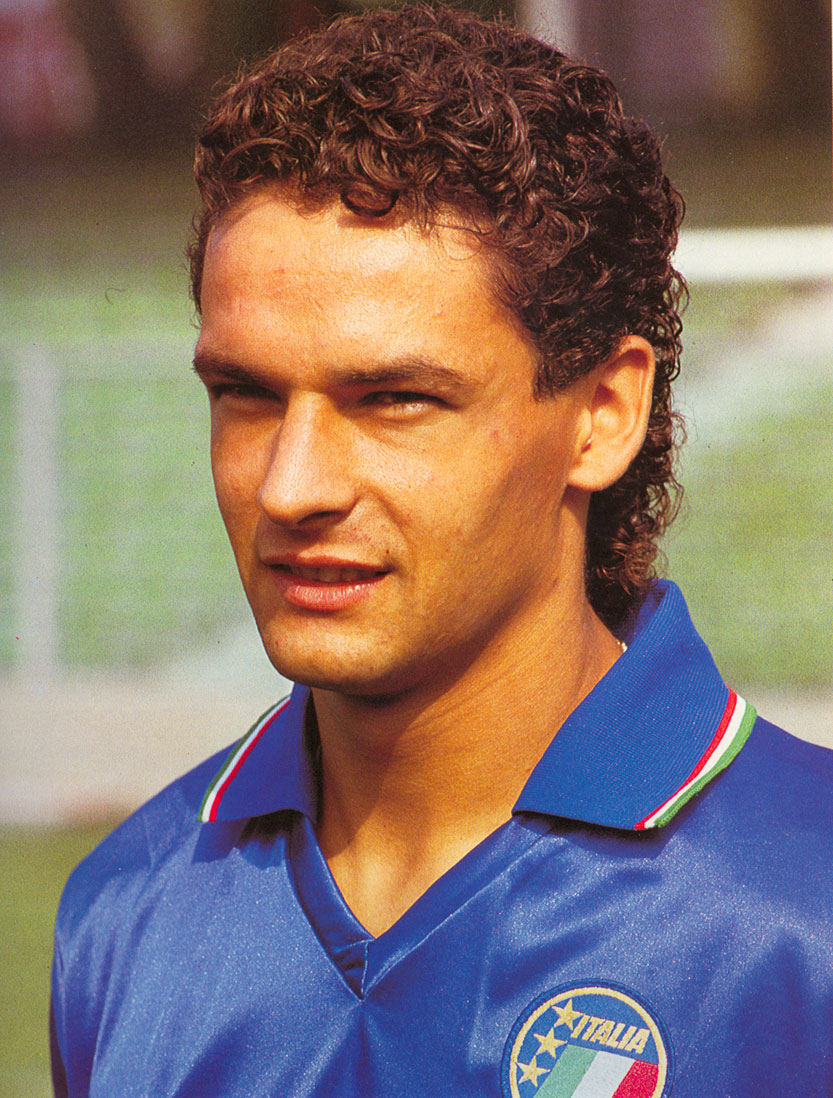
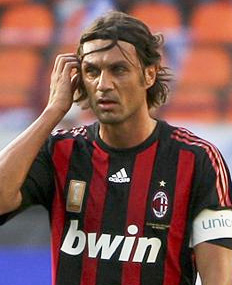
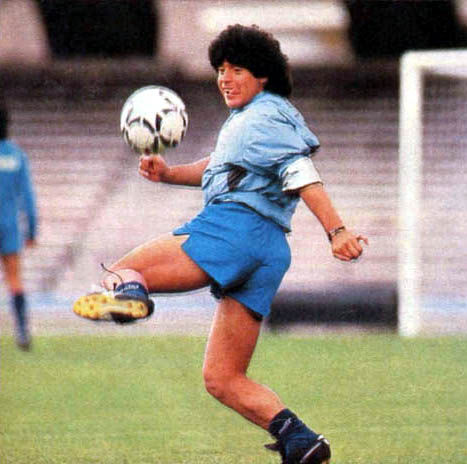
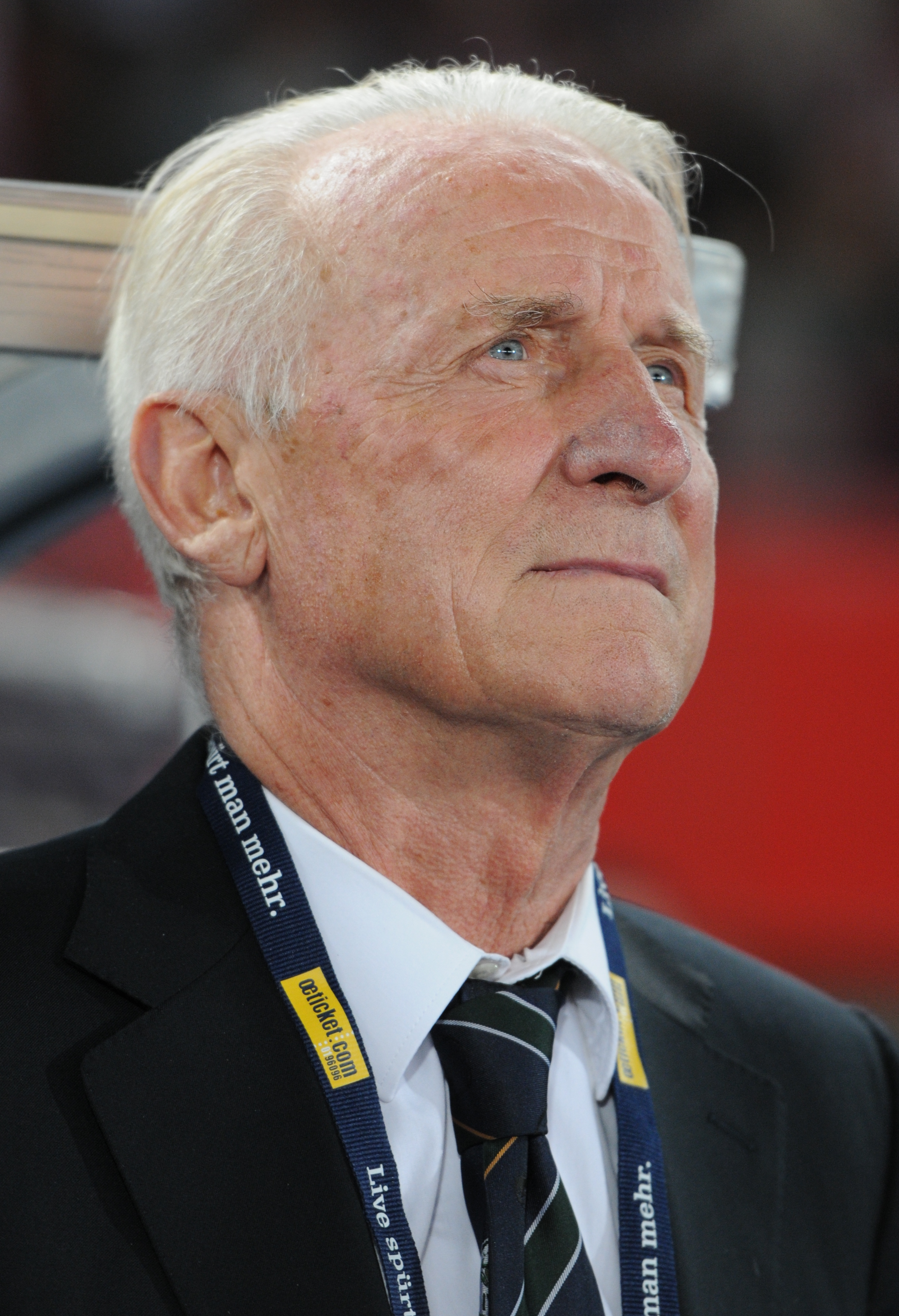
Four inductees (from the first in the heights to the left in a clockwise direction): Roberto Baggio, the first Italian player to be inducted; Paolo Maldini, inducted in 2012; Giovanni Trapattoni, inducted in 2012; Diego Maradona, inducted in 2014.

=== Italian player ===
Year	Name	Ref.
2011	Roberto Baggio	
2012	Paolo Maldini	
2013	Franco Baresi	
2014	Fabio Cannavaro	
2015	Gianluca Vialli	
2016	Giuseppe Bergomi	
2017	Alessandro Del Piero	
2018	Francesco Totti	
2019	Andrea Pirlo	
2021	Alessandro Nesta	
2022	Gianfranco Zola	
2023	Daniele De Rossi	

=== Coach ===
Year	Name	Ref.
2011	(Italy) Marcello Lippi	
2011	(Italy) Arrigo Sacchi	
2012	(Italy) Giovanni Trapattoni	
2013	(Italy) Fabio Capello	
2014	(Italy) Carlo Ancelotti	
2015	(Italy) Roberto Mancini	
2016	(Italy) Claudio Ranieri	
2017	(Italy) Osvaldo Bagnoli	
2018	(Italy) Massimiliano Allegri	
2019	(Italy) Carlo Mazzone	
2021	(Italy) Antonio Conte	
2022	(Portugal) José Mourinho	
2023	(Italy) Luciano Spalletti	

=== Italian veteran ===
Year	Name	Ref.
2011	Gigi Riva	
2012	Dino Zoff	
2013	Gianni Rivera	
2014	Sandro Mazzola	
2015	Marco Tardelli	
2016	Paolo Rossi	
2017	Bruno Conti	
2018	Giancarlo Antognoni	
2019	Gabriele Oriali	
2021	Antonio Cabrini	
2022	Alessandro Altobelli	
2023	Roberto Boninsegna	

=== Italian referee ===
Year	Name	Ref.
2011	Pierluigi Collina	
2012	Luigi Agnolin	
2012	Paolo Casarin	
2013	Sergio Gonella	
2013	Cesare Gussoni	
2014	Stefano Braschi	
2015	Roberto Rosetti	
2016	~~Graziano Cesari~~ (revoked)	
2018	Nicola Rizzoli	
2019	Alberto Michelotti	
2021	Gianluca Rocchi	

=== Italian director ===
Year	Name	Ref.
2011	Adriano Galliani	
2012	Giampiero Boniperti	
2013	Massimo Moratti	
2014	Giuseppe Marotta	
2015	Corrado Ferlaino	
2016	Silvio Berlusconi	
2017	Sergio Campana	
2018	Antonio Matarrese	
2019	Antonio Percassi	
2021	Giovanni Sartori	
2022	Ernesto Pellegrini	
2023	Ariedo Braida	

=== Foreign player ===
Year	Name	Ref.
2011	(France) Michel Platini	
2012	(Netherlands) Marco van Basten	
2013	(Argentina) Gabriel Batistuta	
2014	(Argentina) Diego Maradona	
2015	(Brazil) Ronaldo	
2016	(Brazil) Paulo Roberto Falcão	
2017	(Netherlands) Ruud Gullit	
2018	(Argentina) Javier Zanetti	
2019	(Poland) Zbigniew Boniek	
2021	(Germany) Karl-Heinz Rummenigge	
2022	(France) Zinedine Zidane	
2023	(Ukraine) Andriy Shevchenko	

=== Female Italian player ===
Year	Name	Ref.
2014	Carolina Morace	
2015	Patrizia Panico	
2016	Melania Gabbiadini	
2017	Elisabetta Vignotto	
2018	Milena Bertolini	
2019	Sara Gama	
2021	Barbara Bonansea	
2022	Cristiana Girelli	
2023	Valentina Giacinti	

=== Posthumous awards ===
==== Players ====
Year	Name	Ref.
2011	(Italy) Giovanni Ferrari	
2011	(Italy) Giuseppe Meazza	
2011	(Italy) Silvio Piola	
2011	(Italy) Gaetano Scirea	
2012	(Italy) Valentino Mazzola	
2012	(Italy) Angelo Schiavio	
2013	(Italy) Eraldo Monzeglio	
2014	(Italy) Giacomo Bulgarelli	
2015	(Italy) Giacinto Facchetti	
2018	(Italy) Amedeo Amadei	
2019	(Italy) Pietro Anastasi	
2021	(Italy) Armando Picchi	
2021	(Italy) Romano Fogli	
2022	(Serbia) Siniša Mihajlović	
2023	(Italy) Agostino Di Bartolomei	
2023	(Italy) Vincenzo D'Amico	

==== Coaches ====
Year	Name	Ref.
2011	(Italy) Enzo Bearzot	
2011	(Italy) Fulvio Bernardini	
2011	(Italy) Vittorio Pozzo	
2011	(Italy) Ferruccio Valcareggi	
2012	(Italy) Nereo Rocco	
2014	(Italy) Carlo Carcano	
2015	(Argentina) (France) Helenio Herrera	
2016	(Italy) Cesare Maldini	
2016	(Sweden) Nils Liedholm	
2017	(Italy) Azeglio Vicini	
2017	(Hungary) Árpád Weisz	
2018	(Italy) Giuseppe Viani	
2019	(Italy) Luigi Radice	
2021	(Serbia) Vujadin Boškov	
2021	(Italy) Luigi Simoni	
2022	(Hungary) Ernő Egri Erbstein	
2023	(Italy) Manlio Scopigno	

==== Directors ====
Year	Name	Ref.
2011	(Italy) Ottorino Barassi	
2011	(Italy) Artemio Franchi	
2014	(Italy) Ferruccio Novo	
2015	(Italy) Umberto Agnelli	
2017	(Italy) Italo Allodi	
2017	(Italy) Renato Dall'Ara	
2021	(Italy) Fino Fini	

==== Referees ====
Year	Name	Ref.
2011	(Italy) Giovanni Mauro	
2012	(Italy) Concetto Lo Bello	
2016	(Italy) Giulio Campanati	
2017	(Italy) Stefano Farina	

== Other awards ==
=== Davide Astori Fair Play Award ===
Year	Name	Ref.
2018	Igor Trocchia	
2019	Mattia Agnese	
2019	Romelu Lukaku	
2021	Simon Kjær	
2022	Luca Martelli	

=== Special Award ===
Year	Name	Ref.
2018	Gianni Brera	
2022	Mario Sconcerti	
