= Daniele Orsato =

Italian football referee

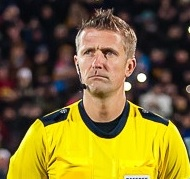
- Orsato in 2016
- Born: 23 November 1975 (age 50); Montecchio Maggiore, Italy

Domestic
Years	League	Role
2006–2024	Serie A	Referee

International
Years	League	Role
2010–2024	FIFA listed	Referee

Daniele Orsato (born 23 November 1975) is an Italian retired football referee. Over his career, which spanned three decades, Orsato refereed a UEFA Champions League final and received accolades from the International Federation of Football History & Statistics.

== Career ==
Orsato became a FIFA referee in 2010. He has served as a referee in qualifying matches for the 2014 World Cup and Euro 2012. Orsato served as the fourth official for the 2009 Supercoppa Italiana, and officiated three consecutive Coppa Italia finals between 2013 and 2015. He also refereed group stage matches in the 2012–13, 2013–14, and 2014–15 UEFA Champions League competitions. In 2016, Orsato refereed the round of 16 match between PSV Eindhoven and Atlético Madrid in the 2015–16 UEFA Champions League. On 14 March 2017, he refereed the round of 16 match between Leicester City and Sevilla in the 2016–17 UEFA Champions League.

On 28 April 2018, Orsato refereed Serie A match between Inter Milan and Juventus where some of his decisions was subject of much controversy including failed to show Juventus' Miralem Pjanić a second yellow card. Orsato himself acknowledged the mistake years later. On 1 July 2018, Orsato was appointed a VAR referee for the 2018 FIFA World Cup match between Croatia and Denmark. On 12 February 2019, Orsato refereed the UEFA Champions League round of 16 first-leg match between Manchester United and Paris Saint-Germain (0–2). He gave out 10 yellow cards (six for United and four for Paris Saint-Germain) and sent off Paul Pogba in the 89th minute. Orsato refereed the 2020 UEFA Champions League final between Paris Saint-Germain and Bayern Munich. In December 2020, Orsato was awarded by IFFHS as the best referee of that calendar year.

Orsato refereed the second leg of the 2021 UEFA Champions League semi-final between Chelsea and Real Madrid at Stamford Bridge; Chelsea won the match 2–0 and advanced to the final 3–1 on aggregate.

On 20 November 2022, Orsato was appointed as the referee for the opening match of the 2022 FIFA World Cup between hosts Qatar and Ecuador. On 13 December 2022, Orsato refereed the World Cup semi-final between Argentina and Croatia, in which he awarded a controversial penalty to Argentina's Julián Alvarez for an alleged foul of obstruction by Croatian goalkeeper Dominik Livaković inside the box, from which Lionel Messi converted to open the scoring; he later came under fire by the Croatian press and manager Zlatko Dalić, as well as Ballon d'Or winner and Croatia captain Luka Modrić, who labelled him as "one of the worst" referees, describing his performance in that game as "a disaster". Argentina won the match 3–0.

On 7 May 2024, Orsato refereed the second leg of the 2024 UEFA Champions League semi-final between Paris Saint-Germain and Borussia Dortmund where he earned praise for his performance on the night, especially his decision to award PSG a free-kick at the edge of the box when a penalty appeared to be the correct call. After the match, Orsato was seen burst into tears at full-time which later confirmed he will retire in the summer after UEFA Euro 2024. On 2 June 2024, Orsato refereed his last match in Serie A, Atalanta vs Fiorentina which ended with Fiorentina winning 2–3. In the summer of 2024, Orsato was included in the expert referee commission of the Russian Football Union, but a week later he refused this job. The referee initially explained his decision by ethical considerations, but then admitted that he was offered a more attractive position. He may head the Association of Italian Referees.

In July 2026, Orsato was named the new chief designator of Serie A and Serie B referees (CAN A and B).

== Major matches refereed ==
Date	Match	Tournament	Venue	Result	Ref
23 August 2020	Paris Saint-Germain vs. Bayern Munich	2020 UEFA Champions League final	Estádio do SL Benfica, Lisbon	0–1	

== Honours ==
- Serie A Referee of the Year: 2019–20, 2020–21, 2021–22, 2022–23, 2023–24
- IFFHS World's Best Referee: 2020
- Giovanni Mauro Award for Best Italian International Referee of the Season: 2012

Sporting positions (Italy) Daniele Orsato
Preceded by 2019 UEFA Champions League final (Slovenia) Damir Skomina	2020 UEFA Champions League final	Succeeded by 2021 UEFA Champions League final (Spain) Antonio Mateu Lahoz
