= Gragnaniello =

Gragnaniello is an Italian surname. Notable people with the surname include:

- Enzo Gragnaniello (born 1954), Italian singer-songwriter and composer
- Raffaele Gragnaniello (born 1981), Italian footballer
