= Daniele Doveri =

Italian football referee

- Born: 10 December 1977 (age 48); Volterra, Italy

Domestic
Years	League	Role
2009–2010	Serie A and Serie B	Referee
2010–2011	Serie B	Referee
2011–2020	Serie A	Referee
2020–	Serie A and Serie B	Referee

International
Years	League	Role
2018–2021	FIFA and UEFA	Referee
2022–	FIFA and UEFA	Video assistant referee

Daniele Doveri (born 10 December 1977) is an Italian football referee.

Despite being born in Tuscany, specifically in Volterra (Province of Pisa) on 10 December 1977, Doveri is affiliated with the Roma 1 refereeing section.

He has been a registered referee since March 1996. After progressing through the lower leagues, he made his Serie B debut on 29 August 2009, officiating the match between Ancona and Salernitana. He then made his Serie A debut on 1 March 2010 in the Chievo–Cagliari match, at the age of 32.

He became an international referee in 2018. Since 1 January 2022, he has no longer been on the list of international referees and, from the same date, has been included in FIFA's group of video assistant referees. He has refereed the 2020 Coppa Italia final, as well as the 2021 Supercoppa Italiana.

He was awarded the Serie A Referee of the Year award for his performance in the 2024–25 Serie A season.

== Honours ==
- Serie A Referee of the Year: 2024–25
- Giovanni Mauro Award for Best Italian International Referee of the Season: 2019
