= Maurizio Mariani =

Italian football referee (born 1982)

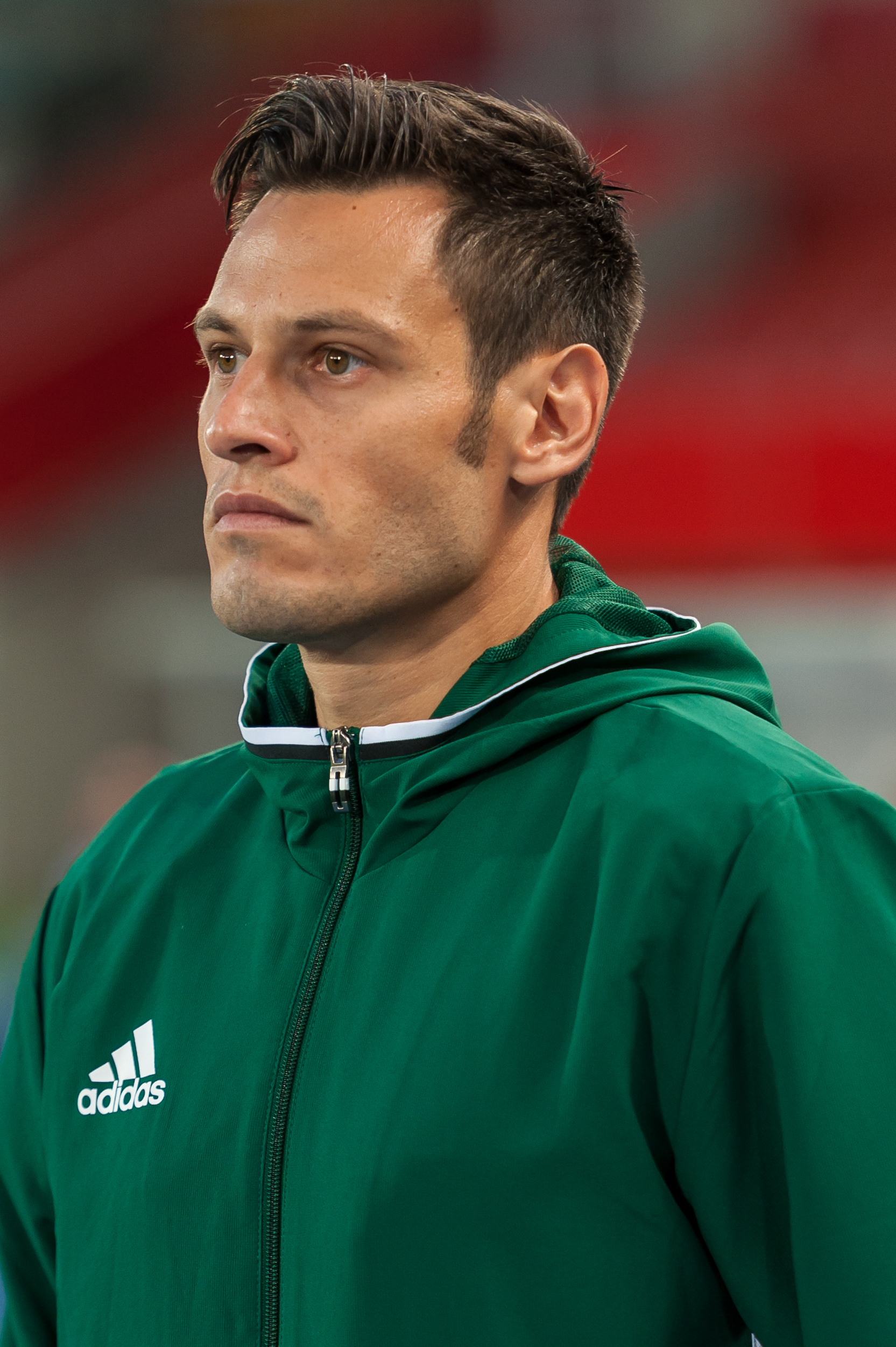
- Mariani in 2016
- Full name: Maurizio Mariani
- Born: 25 February 1982 (age 44); Rome, Italy
- Other occupation: Merchant sailor

Domestic
Years	League	Role
2007–	Italian Football	Referee

International
Years	League	Role
2019–	FIFA listed	Referee; VAR official

Maurizio Mariani (born 25 February 1982) is an Italian football referee who officiates in Serie A. He has been a FIFA listed referee since 2019, and a UEFA elite category referee since 2024.

== Career ==
Born in Rome, Mariani decided to pursue a career in refereeing at the age of 16 while in completing his studies at the Francesco Morosini Naval Academy in Venice. From the age of 18, Mariani originally played as a goalkeeper but he decided to try refereeing.

In October 2000, Mariani made his debut as a referee in youth categories. He then moved to Lazio and began improving his career by reaching Serie D in 2007 and then, after a two-year stay, Serie C in 2009.

After two more years in Serie C, he was promoted to the national association of Italian referees. In 2011, Mariani ascended to Serie B and, in 2013, to Serie A, where he was officialized in 2015.

In October 2020, Mariani refereed his first Derby della Madonnina between Inter Milan and AC Milan. In January 2021, he served as the fourth official of the 2020 Supercoppa Italiana between Juventus and Napoli (2–0).

In 2019, FIFA named him a FIFA-listed referee and, in 2021, FIFA included Mariani as a video assistant referee.

Mariani was assigned as a VAR official for the 2023 UEFA European Under-21 Championship. Among other matches, Mariani was appointed for the quarter-final game between England and Portugal, as well as the semifinal match between England and Israel.

At the end of the 2023–24 Serie A, he had 151 appearances in that category.

In May 2024, CONMEBOL, as part of an exchange program under the cooperation agreement with UEFA, selected Mariani for the 2024 Copa América, and, in December 2024, UEFA promoted him to the Elite category.

In 2025, Mariani refereed the Coppa Italia final between AC Milan and Bologna, and was assigned to lead the final between Argentina and Morocco at the 2025 FIFA U-20 World Cup in Chile.

On 11 May 2026, UEFA announced Mariani would take charge of 2026 UEFA Conference League final between Crystal Palace and Rayo Vallecano on 27 May.

Mariani was chosen to referee at the 2026 FIFA World Cup in North America. In September 2026, he was named Serie A Referee of the Year.

== Selected performances ==
=== Club ===
Date	Match	Tournament	Venue	Result	Ref
27 May 2026	Crystal Palace vs. Rayo Vallecano	2026 UEFA Conference League final	Red Bull Arena, Leipzig	1–0	

=== International ===
2026 FIFA World Cup – North America
Date	Match	Result	Round	Venue
15 June 2026	Saudi Arabia – Uruguay	1–1	Group stage	Hard Rock Stadium, Miami Gardens
23 June 2026	Colombia – DR Congo	1–0	Group stage	Estadio Akron, Zapopan
29 June 2026	Brazil – Japan	2–1	Round of 32	NRG Stadium, Houston

== Honours ==
- Serie A Referee of the Year: 2025–26
- Giovanni Mauro Award for Best Italian International Referee of the Season: 2022

Sporting positions (Italy) Maurizio Mariani
Preceded by 2025 (Bosnia and Herzegovina) Irfan Peljto	UEFA Conference League final referee 2026	Succeeded by 2027 To be determined
