= Fino Fini =

Italian doctor (1928–2020)

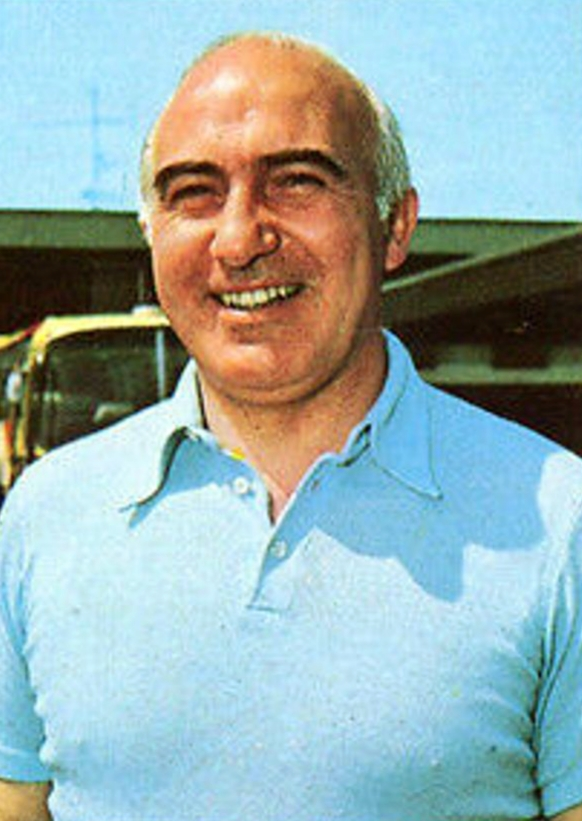
- Born: February 9, 1928; Florence, Kingdom of Italy
- Died: September 16, 2020 (aged 92); Florence, Italy
- Known for: Having been the doctor of Italy national football team from 1962 to 1982

Fino Fini (9 February 1928 – 16 September 2020) was an Italian doctor.

He was known for being the doctor of Italy national football youth teams from 1958 to 1979 and the Italy national football team from 1962 to 1982, including during the two winning campaigns at UEFA Euro 1968 and 1982 FIFA World Cup.

He was also the director of Centro Tecnico Federale di Coverciano for almost thirty years from 1967 until 1995, overseeing also the coaching school and the technical sector. He was the ideator of the Museo del Calcio, a sports museum dedicated to the history of the Italy national football team.

At the international level, he was a member of UEFA's Technical Development Committee from 1976 to 1992 and FIFA's Medical Committee from 1978 to 1995.

In 2021, he was inducted into the Italian Football Hall of Fame.
