= Carlo Luisi =

Italian footballer (born 1977)

Personal information
- Date of birth: 20 March 1977 (age 49)
- Place of birth: Pescara, Italy
- Height: 1.77 m (5 ft 10 in)
- Position: Midfielder

Youth career
- Renato Curi

Senior career*
| Years | Team | Apps | (Gls) |
| 1997–2003 | Benevento | 147 | (1) |
| 1999 | → Fermana (loan) | 0 | (0) |
| 2003–2004 | Pescara | 23 | (0) |
| 2004–2006 | Piacenza | 23 | (0) |
| 2005–2006 | → Pescara (loan) | 33 | (0) |
| 2006–2008 | Modena | 48 | (0) |
| 2008 | Pisa | 8 | (0) |
| 2008–2009 | Ascoli | 27 | (0) |
| 2009–2011 | Modena | 29 | (1) |
| 2012 | Benevento | 5 | (0) |
| 2012–2013 | Maceratese | 1 | (0) |
- * Club domestic league appearances and goals

Carlo Luisi (born 20 March 1977) is an Italian former professional footballer who played as a midfielder.

== Career ==
Luisi started his senior career at Renato Curi of Eccellenza. He then played for Benevento of Serie C2. He won the promotion playoffs in summer 1999, and won a chance to loaned to Serie B newcomer Fermana. He then returned to Benevento in February 2000, and played until summer 2003.

He was signed by hometown club, Serie B newcomer Pescara. In the next season he moved to league rival Piacenza, but loaned back to Pescara in summer 2005.

In summer 2006, he was signed by Modena of Serie B, and Giuseppe Gemiti moved to opposite direction as part of the deal.

In January 2008, he joined Pisa of Serie B. The club finished 6th at the end of season.

In September 2008, he signed a two-year deal with Ascoli. He swap club with Thomas Job.

On 10 August 2009, he re-joined Modena until June 2011.
