= Museo del Calcio =

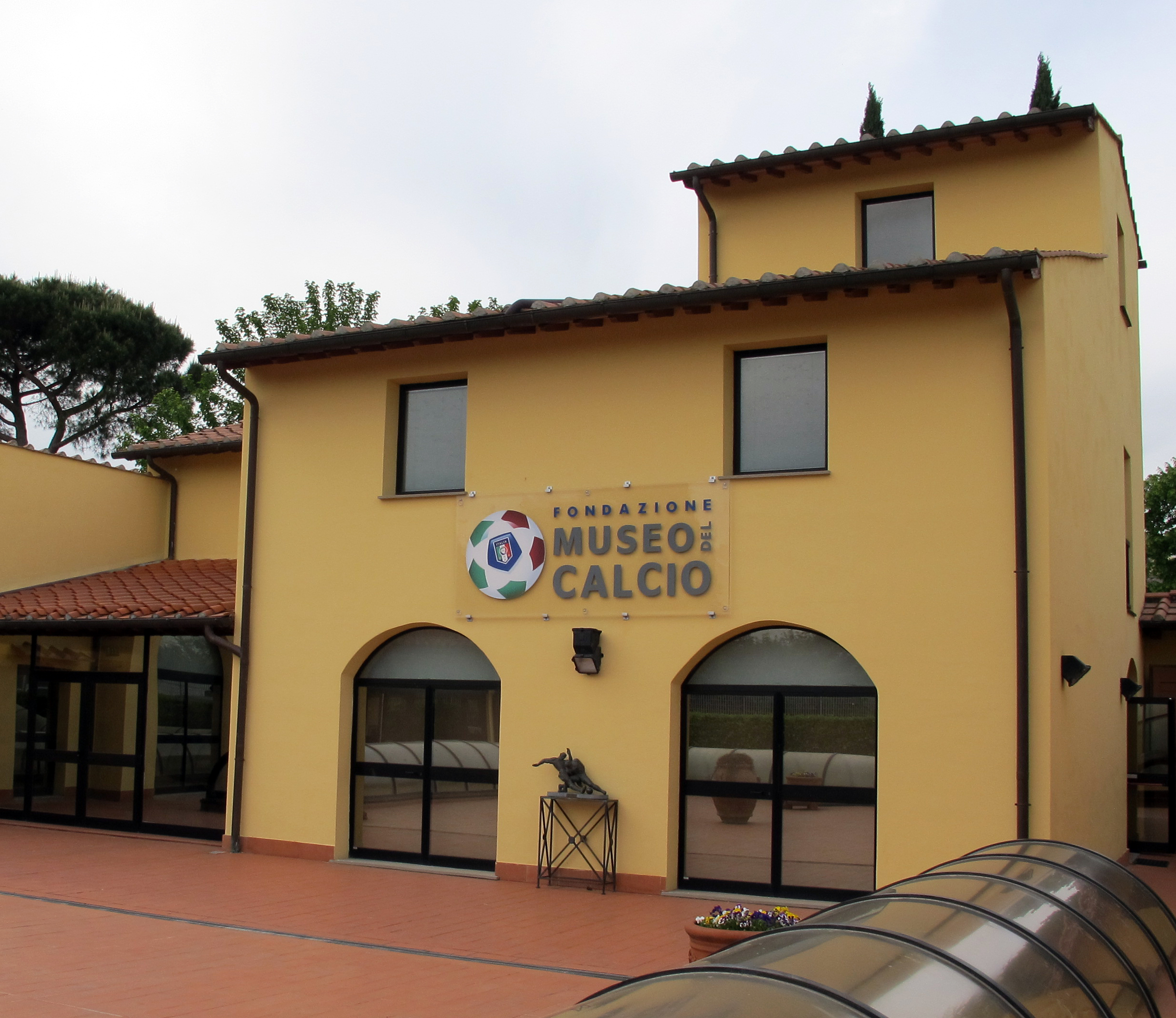
- Entrance of the museum inside the Centro Tecnico Federale di Coverciano.
- Established: 2000
- Location: Coverciano, Florence, Italy
- Coordinates: 43°46′40.57″N 11°18′11.16″E
- Type: Sports museum
- Director: Maurizio Francini
- Owner: Fondazione Museo del Calcio
- Website: Official website

The Museo del Calcio is a sports museum dedicated to the history of the Italy national football team, located in a building of the Centro Tecnico Federale di Coverciano in the Coverciano quartiere of Florence, Italy.

The museum, which is part of the Fondazione Museo del Calcio, is a center of historical documentation of football in Italy. The museum displays numerous memorabilia of the Italian Football Federation since 1934 (balls, medals, shoes, cups, sweaters, etc.), as well as a digital information center with an archive of photographs and videos.

== History ==
The museum was idealized around the time of the 1990 FIFA World Cup in Italy, as part of the expansion of the Centro Tecnico Federale di Coverciano, on the initiative of Fino Fini, president of the Fondazione Museo del Calcio. Ten years later, on 22 May 2000, the museum was inaugurated, in the presence of the then-Minister for Cultural Heritage, Giovanna Melandri, and other federal and civil authorities.

== Exhibitions ==
The museum itinerary is divided into six rooms:

The first room is dedicated to the trophies of the victories of the national team in the 1934 and 1938 World Cups, and at the 1936 Summer Olympics. Among the memorabilia is also the shirt with which Silvio Piola made his national debut on 24 March 1935, against Austria, as well as the black jersey worn by Amedeo Biavati on 12 June 1938, the occasion of the World Cup quarter-final match against France.

In the second room is the crystal ball displayed at the inauguration of the 1994 FIFA World Cup in the United States, along with a collection of historic pennants. Also on display are the shirts of some international players such as Diego Maradona, Pelé and Alfredo Di Stéfano.

The third room is dedicated to the history of the Italian Football Federation since its birth in 1898, as well as a tribute to the Superga air disaster. Then follows a rich collection of shoes and balls from all eras, showing how materials have changed over time.

The fourth room is dedicated to Italy's triumphs at Euro 1968 and 1982 World Cup. For the European Championship, on display are the shirts of Gianni Rivera and Giacinto Facchetti, and the shoes of Ernesto Castano and Pietro Anastasi, plus other relics of the first European success of the Azzurri. To commemorate the third World Cup victory, the shirts of several players are on display, along with other objects such as the pipes of manager Enzo Bearzot and the then-president of Italy, Sandro Pertini.

The fifth room is dedicated to exhibitions in which Italy has been close to success, such as the 1970 World Cup, 1978 World Cup, 1990 World Cup, 1994 World Cup and Euro 2000.

The sixth room is dedicated to the fourth World Cup victory in 2006, as well as to the memorabilia of the champions who have joined the Italian Football Hall of Fame.

Another room was added in 2021 for Italy's Euro 2020 win that display the jerseys of several players.
