= Mario Sconcerti =

Italian journalist (1948–2022)

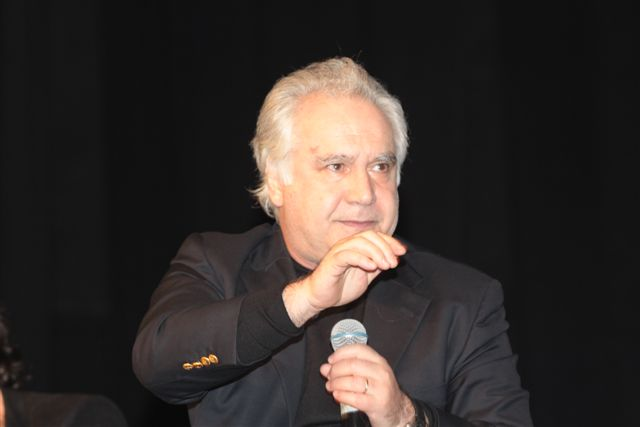
- Sconcerti in 2011
- Born: 24 October 1948; Florence, Italy
- Died: 17 December 2022 (aged 74); Rome, Italy
- Occupation: Sports journalist
- Years active: 1970–2022

Mario Sconcerti (24 October 1948 – 17 December 2022) was an Italian sports journalist and writer.

== Biography ==
Sconcerti was the son of Adriano Sconcerti, a well-known boxing promoter and began his journalistic career at Corriere dello Sport in Florence. In 1972, he moved to the editorial office of Corriere dello Sport in Milan.

=== Death ===
On 17 December 2022, Sconcerti died in a hospital in Rome, one day before the 2022 FIFA World Cup Final and one day after the death of Sinisa Mihajlovic. He had been hospitalized for routine tests at the Roman polyclinic of Tor Vergata and death came suddenly. Until the day before his death, he had collaborated with Corriere dello Sport. After his death, he was inducted into the Italian Football Hall of Fame.

Lega Serie A
(@SerieA)
tweeted:

Ci ha lasciati Mario Sconcerti, storico giornalista che per anni ha raccontato le gesta del calcio italiano. La Lega Serie A esprime le più sentite condoglianze alla famiglia per la sua scomparsa.

17 December 2022
