= Giuseppe Gemiti =

German footballer

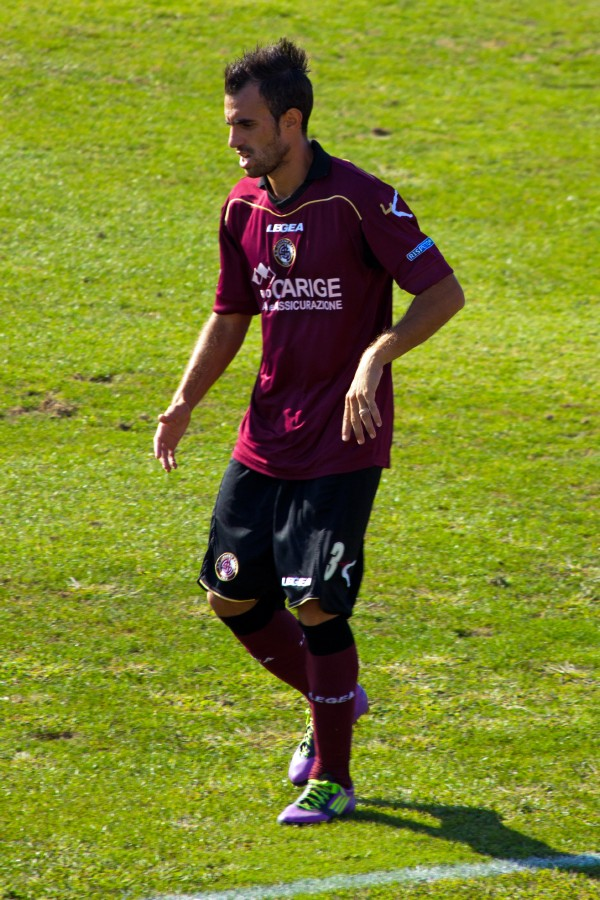
- Gemiti with Livorno in 2012

Personal information
- Date of birth: 3 May 1981 (age 45)
- Place of birth: Frankfurt, West Germany
- Height: 1.78 m (5 ft 10 in)
- Position: Left back

Youth career
- 1999–2000: Eintracht Frankfurt

Senior career*
Years	Team	Apps	(Gls)
2000–2002	Eintracht Frankfurt	15	(2)
2002–2005	Udinese	30	(0)
2004–2005	→ Genoa (loan)	40	(3)
2005–2009	Modena	45	(1)
2006	→ Chievo (loan)	9	(0)
2006–2008	→ Piacenza (loan)	66	(2)
2010–2012	Novara	84	(1)
2012–2015	Livorno	78	(0)
2015–2016	Bari	20	(0)
2016–2017	Cremonese	16	(0)
Total		394	(9)

International career
2001	Germany U18	1	(1)
2001	Germany U20	4	(0)
2002–2004	Germany U21	20	(1)
- * Club domestic league appearances and goals

Giuseppe Gemiti (born 3 May 1981) is a German former professional footballer who played as a left-back.

== Career ==
=== Eintracht Frankfurt and Udinese ===
An Eintracht Frankfurt youth product, Gemiti moved to Italy joining Udinese Calcio in 2002.

Gemiti played just four league matches with Udinese in the 2003–04 season, being injured for a month in October 2003 and out-favored by head coach Luciano Spalletti.

In July 2005, he left for Serie B side Modena in a co-ownership deal; he left for Serie A side Chievo in January 2006. In June 2006 Chievo decided not to buy him outright and Modena not to buy Riccardo Bolzan either. But Modena decided to buy Cristian Bucchi from Chievo and Tommaso Chiecchi was bought back by Chievo from Modena.

In July 2006, he left for Piacenza as part of Carlo Luisi's deal.

=== Novara ===
In January 2010, he signed a six-month deal with Novara as a free agent, after being released by Modena in summer 2009. On 8 June 2010, the club announced he signed a new three-year contract after winning the 1st Division Group A champion and promoted to Serie B.

=== Livorno ===
In summer 2012 Gemiti was swapped with Romano Perticone of Livorno. Gemiti signed a three-year contract.

=== Bari ===
On 19 June 2015, Gemiti was signed by Bari.

=== Cremonese ===
On 24 June 2016, Gemiti joined Serie C club Cremonese.

== Honours ==
Novara

- Lega Pro Prima Divisione: 2009–10
