= Paolo Rachini =

Italian footballer

Personal information
- Date of birth: 1 February 1970 (age 56)
- Place of birth: Atri, Italy
- Height: 1.80 m (5 ft 11 in)
- Position: Midfielder

Youth career
- Francavilla

Senior career*
Years	Team	Apps	(Gls)
1987–1993	Francavilla	90	(8)
1988–1989	→ Hatria (loan)		
1993–1998	Salernitana	133	(3)
1998–2000	Pescara	26	(1)
1999–2000	→ Fermana (loan)	28	(8)
2001	L'Aquila	29	(0)
2001–2004	Rimini	66	(2)
2004–2006	RC Angolana	49	(11)
Total		421	(33)

Managerial career
- 2016–2018: RC Angolana
- 2018–2019: Francavilla
- 2019: Pineto
- 2021–2022: RC Angolana
- 2023: RC Angolana
- * Club domestic league appearances and goals

Paolo Rachini (born 1 February 1970) is an Italian former professional footballer who played as a midfielder.

== Career ==
Revealed by Francavilla, Paolo Rachini stood out especially playing for Salernitana, where he was champion of Serie B. He also had spells at Pescara, Fernana, L'Aquila, Rimini and Renato Curi Angolana, the team for which Rachini was champion in the Eccellenza. As a coach, Rachini also trained the Francavilla and RC Angolana teams in several spells.

== Honours ==
Salernitana

- Serie B: 1997–98

Renato Curi Angolana

- Eccellenza: 2004–05 (Abruzzo)
