= Renato Curi Angolana =

Italian football club

- Full name: Renato Curi Angolana s.r.l.
- Founded: 1949; 76 years ago
- Ground: Stadio Leonardo Petruzzi, Città Sant'Angelo, Italy
- Capacity: 2,020
- Chairman: Sergio Spinelli
- Manager: Andrea Pierantoni
- League: Eccellenza /A
- 2022–23: Eccellenza/A, 3rd
Home colours	Away colours

Renato Curi Angolana, or simply Angolana, is an Italian association football club located in Città Sant'Angelo, Abruzzo. It currently plays in Eccellenza.

== History ==
The club was founded in 1998 after the merger of Renato Curi, same name of a footballer of Perugia who suddenly died in 1977 during a league match against Juventus (founded in 1978 in Pescara playing in Eccellenza Abruzzo) and Angolana (founded in 1948 in Città Sant'Angelo playing in Promozione Abruzzo).

In the 2004-2005 season, they were promoted to Serie D from Eccellenza Abruzzo. In the 2013-2014 season, the club returned to Eccellenza from Serie D.

== Colors and badge ==
Its colors are black and blue.

== Famous players ==
- Massimo Oddo
- Fabio Grosso
- Ernesto Terra
- Raffaele Biancolino
- Andrea D'Agostino
- Alessandro Del Grosso
- Matteo Ciofani
- Marco Capuano
- Alessandro Iacobucci
- Carlo Luisi
- Paolo Rachini
