= Bruno Roghi =

Italian sports journalist

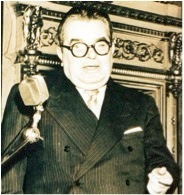
- Born: 28 April 1894; Verona, Italy
- Died: 1 February 1962 (aged 67); Milan, Italy
- Occupation: Writer

Bruno Roghi (28 April 1894 – 1 February 1962) was an Italian sports journalist and writer who was the only person to become editor of all three main Italian sports newspapers.

== Biography ==
Roghi was the son of Angelo Roghi, who practised both as a doctor and as a lawyer, and his wife Clara (born Taidelli), one of the first women in Italy to be active in politics and to champion the rights of women. The family was from Sanguinetto near Verona but moved to Milan while Roghi was still a child.

Roghi attended the Conservatorio di Milano, then qualified as a lawyer at the University of Pavia. After serving in World War I, he began a legal career in Milan but also began writing articles for the Gazzetta dello sport, which were so well received that the editor persuaded him to abandon the law for journalism.

He submitted work for the literature event in the art competition at the 1932 Summer Olympics.

In 1936, he was sent to report on Italy's war against Abyssinia and, following the troops, he entered Addis Ababa. He published a book on his experiences in the same year.

On 8 October 1936, he became the director of the Gazzetta dello Sport and continued until 1943; he was reappointed in 1945. In 1947, he took over the direction of the Corriere dello Sport until 1960 and of Tuttosport from 1960 to 1962, the year in which he died at the age of 67 from an incurable illness. He was the only person ever to direct all three main Italian sports dailies.

The quality of his writing was considered exceptional. He wrote about all sports, but above all he preferred to deal with subjects relating to equestrianism and cycling.

He was the founder and president of the Gruppo Milanese Giornalisti Sportivi and of the Unione Stampa Sportiva Italiana and also vice-president of the Unione Internazionale Stampa Sportiva.

In his honour, Sanguinetto instituted an annual literary prize dedicated to books on sport by Italian authors.
