= Serie A Referee of the Year =

Annual Italian Footballers' Association award

AIC Serie A Referee of the Year
- Sport: Association football
- Competition: Serie A
- Awarded for: Referee considered to have performed the best in each given Serie A season
- Local name: Migliore arbitro AIC (Italian)
- Country: Italy
- Presented by: Italian Footballers' Association (AIC)

History
- First award: 1997
- Editions: 30
- First winner: Pierluigi Collina (1997)
- Most wins: Pierluigi Collina; Nicola Rizzoli; (7 times each)
- Most recent: Maurizio Mariani (2026)
- Website: Official website

The AIC Serie A Referee of the Year (Italian: Migliore arbitro AIC) is a yearly award organized by the Italian Footballers' Association (AIC) given to the referee who has been considered to have performed the best over the previous Serie A season. The award is part of the Gran Galà del Calcio (former Oscar del Calcio) awards event.

== Winners ==
Year	Referee	Ref(s)
1996–97	Pierluigi Collina	
1997–98	Pierluigi Collina	
1998–99	Stefano Braschi	
1999–2000	Pierluigi Collina	
2000–01	Stefano Braschi	
2001–02	Pierluigi Collina	
2002–03	Pierluigi Collina	
2003–04	Pierluigi Collina	
2004–05	Pierluigi Collina	
2005–06	Roberto Rosetti	
2006–07	Roberto Rosetti	
2007–08	Roberto Rosetti	
2008–09	Roberto Rosetti	
2009–10	Emidio Morganti	
2010–11	Nicola Rizzoli	
2011–12	Nicola Rizzoli	
2012–13	Nicola Rizzoli	
2013–14	Nicola Rizzoli	
2014–15	Nicola Rizzoli	
2015–16	Nicola Rizzoli	
2016–17	Nicola Rizzoli	
2017–18	Gianluca Rocchi	
2018–19	Gianluca Rocchi	
2019–20	Daniele Orsato	
2020–21	Daniele Orsato	
2021–22	Daniele Orsato	
2022–23	Daniele Orsato	
2023–24	Daniele Orsato	
2024–25	Daniele Doveri	
2025–26	Maurizio Mariani	
