= Gianluca Rocchi =

Italian football referee (born 1973)

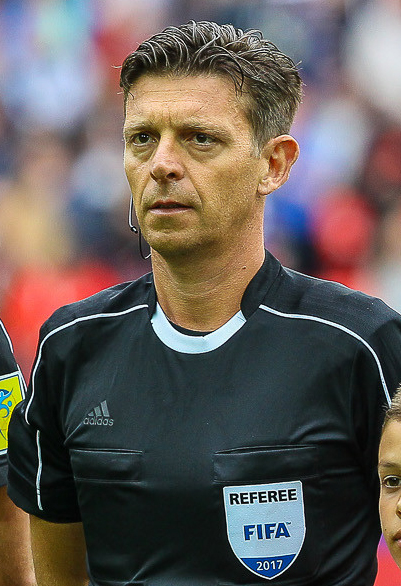
- Rocchi in 2017
- Full name: Gianluca Rocchi
- Born: 25 August 1973 (age 53); Florence, Italy

Domestic
Years	League	Role
2000–2003	Serie C	Referee
2003–2010	Serie B	Referee
2004–2020	Serie A	Referee

International
Years	League	Role
2008–2020	FIFA listed	Referee
2010–2020	UEFA Elite	Referee

Gianluca Rocchi (Italian: [dʒanˈluːka ˈrɔkki]; born 25 August 1973) is an Italian former football referee.

== Career ==
Rocchi became a referee in 1990 and officiated in 38 matches in three Serie C seasons starting from 2000. He was later promoted to the higher series, making his debut in U.S. Lecce-Reggina Calcio (16 May 2004). In 2010, when the National Referee Committee for Serie A and Serie B split, he was assigned to Serie A's Committee.

He made his international debut on 26 May 2008, in a friendly match between Netherlands and Greece national under-19 football team. He was later called-up for European club cup matches (first for the UEFA Cup during the 2008–09 season, then for the Champions League during the 2010–11 season).

He refereed three international matches during the UEFA Euro 2012 qualifying, and later was called-up as referee for the Men's football tournament at 2012 Summer Olympics in London.

On 18 August 2013, Rocchi refereed the Supercoppa Italiana Final between Juventus and Lazio.

On 6 October 2014, he was suspended for one month after a Serie A encounter between Juventus and Roma for poor officiating. The match would later become known as the "Rocchi Horror Picture Show".

On 21 May 2016, Rocchi refereed the 2016 Coppa Italia Final between Milan and Juventus.

In April 2017, FIFA announced that Rocchi had been chosen as one of the referees for the 2017 FIFA Confederations Cup in Russia.

In July 2017, UEFA announced that Rocchi had been chosen to referee the UEFA Super Cup Final between Real Madrid and Manchester United.

On 29 March 2018, FIFA announced that Rocchi would officiate some matches at the 2018 FIFA World Cup along with Elenito Di Liberatore and Mauro Tonolini as assistant referees.

On 13 May 2019, UEFA announced that Rocchi had been chosen to referee the 2019 UEFA Europa League Final between Chelsea and Arsenal.

On 5 November 2019, Rocchi refereed the 2019–20 UEFA Champions League group stage match between Ajax and Chelsea. Ending in a 4–4 draw at Stamford Bridge, the match was controversial, because Rocchi issued two red cards and a direct penalty, sending off both Ajax centre-backs Daley Blind and Joël Veltman, while issuing a penalty for Chelsea all in the same call. His officiating later came under criticism in the press and at UEFA. 442oons, a successful YouTube channel that makes animated parodies of football matches, scored a hit with their viral video 'Sent Off Two Men', a play on The Weather Girls successful single 'It's Raining Men'. Rocchi later reacted seemingly upset over the reactions to his officiating.

Rocchi retired from refereeing at the age of 46, with his last match officiated being between Juventus and Roma on 1 August 2020. In 2021, he was inducted into the Italian Football Hall of Fame.

== Major matches refereed ==
Date	Match	Tournament	Venue	Result	Ref
8 August 2017	Real Madrid vs Manchester United	2017 UEFA Super Cup	Philip II Arena, Skopje	2–1	
29 May 2019	Chelsea vs Arsenal	2019 UEFA Europa League final	Olympic Stadium, Baku	4–1	

== Honours ==
- Serie A Referee of the Year: 2018, 2019
- Italian Football Hall of Fame: 2021
- Giovanni Mauro Award for Best Italian International Referee of the Season: 2009

Sporting positions
Preceded by (Serbia) Milorad Mažić	UEFA Super Cup Final Referee; 2017	Succeeded by (Poland) Szymon Marciniak
Preceded by (Netherlands) Björn Kuipers	UEFA Europa League Final Referee; 2019	Succeeded by (Netherlands) Danny Makkelie
