= Andrea D'Agostino =

Italian footballer (born 1985)

Personal information
- Date of birth: 3 July 1985 (age 41)
- Place of birth: Naples, Italy
- Height: 1.83 m (6 ft 0 in)
- Position: Midfielder

Team information
- Current team: Angolana

Youth career
- Napoli

Senior career*
Years	Team	Apps	(Gls)
2003–2004	Chievo	0	(0)
2004–2005	Foggia	8	(0)
2005–2006	Potenza	21	(0)
2007	Rieti	6	(1)
2007–2009	Pavia	51	(0)
2009–	Foggia	8	(0)

International career
2003	Italy U-18	2	(1)
2003–2004	Italy U-19	3	(0)
2004–2005	Italy U-20	5	(0)
- * Club domestic league appearances and goals as of 22:00, 3 May 2010 (UTC)

Andrea D'Agostino (born 3 July 1985) is an Italian professional football player currently playing for Renato Curi Angolana.

He represented Italy at the 2005 FIFA World Youth Championship.
