= Ariedo Braida =

Italian footballer and sporting director (born 1946)

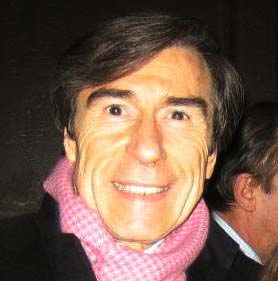
- Braida in 2007

Personal information
- Date of birth: 21 April 1946 (age 80)
- Place of birth: Precenicco, Italy
- Height: 1.80 m (5 ft 11 in)
- Position: Forward

Youth career
- 1957–1962: Palazzolo dello Stella

Senior career*
Years	Team	Apps	(Gls)
1962–1966	Udinese	47	(15)
1966–1967	Pisa	13	(5)
1967–1968	Brescia	16	(2)
1968–1969	Mantova	30	(2)
1969–1972	Varese	70	(22)
1972–1974	Cesena	47	(12)
1974–1975	Palermo	35	(6)
1975–1977	Monza	55	(14)
1977–1979	Parma	41	(12)
1979–1981	Sant'Angelo	34	(7)
Total		388	(97)

Managerial career
- 1981–1984: Monza (sporting director)
- 1984–1986: Udinese (sporting director)
- 1986–2002: AC Milan (CEO)
- 2002–2013: AC Milan (sporting director)
- 2014: Sampdoria (sporting director)
- 2015: Barcelona (sporting director)
- 2015–2019: Barcelona (scout)
- 2020–2023: Cremonese (CEO)
- * Club domestic league appearances and goals

Ariedo Braida (born 21 April 1946) is an Italian football sporting director and former player.

In 2023, he was inducted into the Italian Football Hall of Fame.

== Playing career ==
Braida played 79 games in the Serie A, scoring 14 goals in four seasons for Brescia, Varese and Cesena. In the 1969–70 Serie B, with Varese, Braida scored 13 goals and was joint-top scorer of the season alongside teammate Roberto Bettega and Aquilino Bonfanti of Catania.

== Managerial career ==
After his career as a footballer, Braida held the position of sporting director of Monza from 1981 to 1984, before moving on to Udinese in the same role. He held the position of CEO of AC Milan from 1986 to 2002, when he became sporting director of the Rossoneri. On 31 December 2013, he left his position as Milan sporting director.

In July 2014, Braida was appointed CEO of Sampdoria. However, the change in property led to the separation in September.

On 12 February 2015, Braida became the sporting director of Barcelona, dealing in particular with negotiations with foreign clubs. On 12 August 2019, Barcelona relieved him of his duties. Braida, however, did not accept the conditions of his liquidation and, for this reason, on 1 October 2019, he denounced the club for "dismissal without just cause".

On 12 November 2020, Braida was announced as CEO of Cremonese, a position he held from 1 December 2020. Having become a strategic adviser later on, Braida left the Lombard club on 30 June 2023 following their relegation to Serie B.

== Style of play ==
Braida played as a striker and, sometimes, as a second striker.

== Personal life ==
On 10 September 2017, Braida remarried Giuditta Milioti in Ripalta Cremasca, Italy.
