= Nicola Rizzoli =

Italian football referee

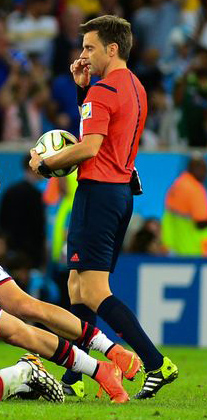
- Rizzoli during the 2014 FIFA World Cup Final
- Born: 5 October 1971 (age 55); Mirandola, Modena, Italy
- Other occupation: Architect

Domestic
Years	League	Role
1998–2001	Serie C	Referee
2001–2010	Serie A and B	Referee
2010–2017	Serie A	Referee

International
Years	League	Role
2007–2017	FIFA listed	Referee

Nicola Rizzoli (Italian pronunciation: [niˈkɔːla ritˈtsɔːli]; born 5 October 1971) is an Italian former football referee who refereed in the Italian Serie A from 2002 to 2017 and was a FIFA-listed referee from 2007 to 2017. He refereed the 2014 FIFA World Cup Final between Germany and Argentina on 13 July at the Estádio do Maracanã and the 2013 Champions League Final between Borussia Dortmund and Bayern Munich at Wembley Stadium. Rizzoli won seven consecutive AIC Serie A Referee of the Year Awards from 2011 to 2017. On 18 February 2017, Soccer 360 included Rizzoli on its list of the top 5 referees in the 21st century.

== Career ==
Rizzoli refereed his first UEFA Champions League qualifying match in August 2007 and took charge of his first Champions League group stage match, a 2–0 Sporting CP victory over Basel, on 1 October 2008. On 7 April 2010, Rizzoli took charge of the Champions League quarter-final second leg between Manchester United and Bayern Munich. With the score at 3–1 to Manchester United (4–3 on aggregate), Rizzoli sent off their right-back, Rafael, for a second bookable offence. Bayern then scored again and won the tie on away goals.

On 5 May 2010, Rizzoli refereed the Coppa Italia Final between Inter and Roma. On 12 May, Rizzoli refereed the 2010 UEFA Europa League Final, as Atlético Madrid defeated Fulham 2–1.

On 6 August 2011, Rizzoli refereed the Supercoppa Italiana Final between Milan and Inter.

In May 2013, Rizzoli was selected by UEFA to referee the 2013 Champions League Final at Wembley, in which Bayern Munich defeat Borussia Dortmund 2–1.

At the international level, Rizzoli served as a referee at UEFA Euro 2012 and officiated in qualifiers for the 2010 and 2014 World Cups. FIFA named Rizzoli to its list of 52 candidate referees for the 2014 FIFA World Cup in Brazil. Rizzoli was selected and was the head referee for a group stage match between Spain and the Netherlands. He refereed the 2014 FIFA World Cup Final between Germany and Argentina on 13 July at the Estádio do Maracanã.

Rizzoli was named the 2014 and 2015 World's Best Referee by IFFHS.

On 15 September 2015, Rizzoli was in charge of the UEFA Champions League Group Stage match between PSV Eindhoven and Manchester United where PSV's Héctor Moreno broke the leg of Manchester United defender Luke Shaw. His decision not to show Moreno a red card for the tackle was controversial. UEFA chief refereeing officer Pierluigi Collina reminded officials of their responsibility to player safety after the incident.

In December 2015, Rizzoli was named one of the eighteen referees appointed for UEFA Euro 2016.

On 4 July 2017, Rizzoli retired as referee, although eligible for one more year, and was appointed as the head Serie A designator.

== Personal life ==
When he was not refereeing, Rizzoli worked as an architect.

== Major matches refereed ==
Date	Match	Tournament	Ref
12 May 2010	Atlético Madrid vs Fulham (2–1 a.e.t.)	2010 UEFA Europa League Final	
25 May 2013	Borussia Dortmund vs Bayern Munich (1–2)	2013 UEFA Champions League final	
13 July 2014	Germany vs Argentina (1–0 a.e.t.)	2014 FIFA World Cup final	

== Honours ==
- Serie A Referee of the Year (7): 2011, 2012, 2013, 2014, 2015, 2016, 2017
- IFFHS World's Best Referee (2): 2014, 2015
- Globe Soccer Award for the Best Referee of the Year (1): 2014
- Italian Football Hall of Fame: 2018
- Giovanni Mauro Award for Best Italian International Referee of the Season: 2006–07

Sporting positions (Italy) Nicola Rizzoli
Preceded by 2009 UEFA Cup Final (Spain) Luis Medina Cantalejo	2010 UEFA Europa League Final Referee	Succeeded by 2011 UEFA Europa League Final (Spain) Carlos Velasco Carballo
Preceded by 2012 UEFA Champions League Final (Portugal) Pedro Proença	2013 UEFA Champions League Final Referee	Succeeded by 2014 UEFA Champions League Final (Netherlands) Björn Kuipers
Preceded by 2010 FIFA World Cup Final (England) Howard Webb	2014 FIFA World Cup Final Referee	Succeeded by 2018 FIFA World Cup Final (Argentina) Néstor Pitana
