= Riccardo Bolzan =

Italian footballer (born 1984)

Personal information
- Date of birth: 1 September 1984 (age 42)
- Place of birth: Motta di Livenza, Italy
- Height: 1.78 m (5 ft 10 in)
- Position: Left back

Senior career*
Years	Team	Apps	(Gls)
- Conegliano
2003–2005	Sangiovannese	35	(0)
2005–2006	Modena	0	(0)
2006–2007	Pisa	24	(0)
2007–2008	Lucchese	16	(1)
2008–2009	Monza	31	(2)
2009–2010	Taranto	31	(2)
2010–2012	Nocerina	62	(1)
2012–2013	Benevento	15	(0)
2013–2014	Messina	10	(0)
2014	Torres	12	(0)
2014–2015	Sacilese	5	(0)
2015	Paganese	4	(0)
2015–2016	Fontanafredda	18	(0)
2016–2017	Sorrento		
2017–2018	Campobasso	20	(0)
Total		283	(6)
- * Club domestic league appearances and goals

Riccardo Bolzan (born 1 September 1984) is an Italian former footballer who plays as a left back.

== Club career ==
=== Serie D ===
Born in Gaiarine, the Province of Treviso, Veneto, Bolzan started his senior career with local side of Cordignano. in the next season he left for Bellunoponte, another Serie D side. After a limited chance, he left for his third Serie D side Conegliano San Vendemiano.

=== Lega Pro ===
In July 2003, he left for Venezia along with Fabio Mazzeo, located in the regional capital, Venice. He was loaned to Serie C2 side Sangiovannese and turned to co–ownership deal a season later, after the team won promotion playoff.

In June 2005, Sangiovannese signed the remain rights by made a higher tender price between the two clubs; Venezia went bankrupt few weeks later. Bolzan played the opening league match with the Tuscany based team against Pisa on 28 August, But on 30 August 2005 returned to Veneto for Serie A side Chievo.

On the same day, he left for Serie B side Modena. The Serie B side also signed Cristian Bucchi and Tommaso Chiecchi from Chievo in co-ownership deals few weeks before. In his first Serie B season, he made nil appearance with the Emilia–Romagna side. In June 2006, Modena decided not to buy Bolzan and Chievo decided not to buy Giuseppe Gemiti; however, Modena signed Bucchi and Chievo bought back Chiecchi.

In 2006–07 season, he left for Serie C1 club Pisa, which he won the promotion playoffs. In 2007–08 season, he remained in Tuscany for another Serie C1 club Lucchese.

In 2008–09 season, he remained in Lega Pro Prima Divisione (ex–Serie C1), but now for Lombardy side Monza. He made a break through that season, made 31 league appearances. In 2009–10 season, he was sold to southern Italy (Apulia) for Prima Divisione side Taranto in co–ownership deal, along with Roberto Cortese.

In June 2010, both clubs failed to agree a price for the players and the ownership was decided by the tender price the clubs submitted to Lega Calcio. On 26 June 2010, Lega Calcio announced that Taranto made a higher bid to buy Bolzan from Chievo and Chievo made a higher bid to sign Cortese.

In July 2010, he was sold to Prima Divisione side Nocerina.

In 2016, he signed for Eccellenza Campania side F.C. Sorrento, newly refounded after their administration and temporary expulsion from league football.

== International career ==
Bolzan received a call-up from Italy U21 B team specially for 2005 Mediterranean Games, and for a preparation match against Serie D Best XI. He was at the bench in the 2 group stage matches. He also received a call-up from Italy under-21 Serie B representative team in November 2005, for a training camp and against Pro Patria's youth team (Berretti team).

== Executive career ==
On 13 June 2020, Bolzan was appointed sporting director at Nocerina until 25 January 2022.

He left Nocerina and was appointed sporting director at Carpi on 7 February 2022 until 7 June 2022.

On 11 July 2022, Bolzan was appointed sporting director at Matera until 30 June 2023.

He left Matera and was appointed sporting director at Prato on 4 July 2023 until 16 January 2024.

On 1 July 2024, Bolzan was appointed sporting director at Sarnese until 26 December 2024.
