= Marco Zamboni =

Italian footballer

Personal information
- Date of birth: 7 December 1977 (age 48)
- Place of birth: Bussolengo, Italy
- Height: 1.86 m (6 ft 1 in)
- Position: Defender

Team information
- Current team: AC Garda

Senior career*
Years	Team	Apps	(Gls)
1995–1997	Chievo	38	(1)
1997–1999	Juventus	1	(0)
1997	→ Napoli (loan)	4	(0)
1998	→ Chievo (loan)	12	(0)
1998–1999	→ Lecce (loan)	36	(1)
1999–2003	Udinese	31	(0)
2002	→ Modena (loan)	5	(0)
2003	→ Verona (loan)	18	(0)
2003–2004	Napoli	37	(3)
2004–2006	Reggina	29	(2)
2005–2006	→ Sampdoria (loan)	1	(0)
2006–2007	Spezia	10	(0)
2007	→ Crotone (loan)	16	(0)
2007–2008	Crotone	0	(0)
2008–2012	SPAL 1907	94	(1)
2012–2013	Trento	12	(0)
2017	GSD Ambrosiana	3	(0)
2018–2019	ASD Sona		
2019	AC Garda		
2019–2020	Castelbaldo Masi		
2020–2021	Sona	4	(0)
2021–	Pedemonte		

International career
1998	Italy U21	1	(0)
- * Club domestic league appearances and goals as of 30 June 2021

Marco Khaleel Zamboni (born 7 December 1977) is an Italian professional football defender who plays for an amateur side Pedemonte.

== Club career ==
Zamboni was born in Bussolengo, Italy. After starting his career with Chievo in 1995, he played for Juventus between 1997 and 1999, but immediately after he was signed by the Turin club in the summer of 1997, he was loaned to Napoli of Serie A in October and subsequently back to Chievo (Serie B) in January.

After he was loaned to U.S. Lecce, he was spotted by Serie A team Udinese Calcio. He was signed in co-ownership deal for €1.29M (2.5 billion lire) .Udinese also signed Morgan De Sanctis in co-ownership deal also for €1.29M (2.5 billion lire).

After not playing in 2001–02 season, he left on loan again to Modena F.C. of Serie A, then Verona (Serie B). In summer 2003, he was signed by Napoli again, then time played 37 games in Serie B. In summer 2004, he returned to Serie A football, for Reggina Calcio. He then spotted by U.C. Sampdoria, signed him on loan.

Ahead of the 2019–20 season, 41-year-old Zamboni joined AC Garda.

== International career ==
Zamboni has been capped for Italy national under-21 football team. He was an unused member of the Italy squad that won the gold medal at the 1997 Mediterranean Games Football Tournament, on home soil.

== Style of play ==
Zamboni is a reliable defender who possesses great physical strength, although he is not particularly skilful from a technical standpoint; his characteristics led him to be compared to Pietro Vierchowod in his youth. He is capable of playing both as a centre-back and as a right-back.

== Honours ==
Udinese

- UEFA Intertoto Cup: 2000
