= Vittorio Tosto =

Italian footballer

Personal information
- Date of birth: 14 June 1974 (age 52)
- Place of birth: Cariati, Italy
- Height: 1.83 m (6 ft 0 in)
- Position: Defender

Senior career*
Years	Team	Apps	(Gls)
1990–1991	Cariatese	27	(0)
1991–1993	Fiorentina	7	(0)
1993–1994	Salernitana	16	(1)
1994	Torino	3	(0)
1994–1995	Lucchese	21	(5)
1995–1996	Avellino	31	(3)
1996–1999	Salernitana	94	(4)
1999–2000	Sampdoria	19	(0)
2000–2003	Piacenza	94	(3)
2003–2004	Napoli	38	(5)
2004–2005	Genoa	30	(0)
2005	Ascoli	15	(2)
2006–2010	Empoli	128	(3)
Total		523	(26)
- * Club domestic league appearances and goals

Vittorio Tosto (born 14 June 1974 in Marina di Cariati, Cosenza) is an Italian former footballer who played as a defender.
