= Roberto Rosetti =

Italian football referee

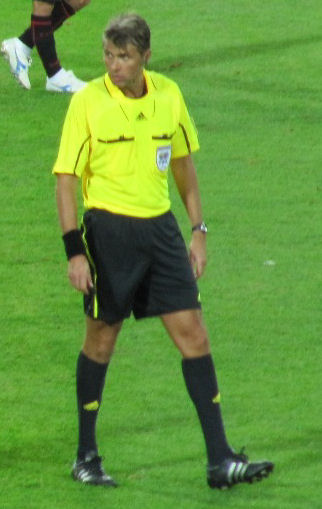
- Rosetti in 2009
- Full name: Roberto Rosetti
- Born: 18 September 1967 (age 59); Turin, Italy
- Other occupation: Football referee, hospital manager, and financial advisor

Domestic
Years	League	Role
1994–1997	Serie C	Referee
1997–2010	Serie A and B	Referee

International
Years	League	Role
2002–2010	FIFA	Referee

Roberto Rosetti (born 18 September 1967) is an Italian former football referee.

Rosetti is counted amongst the top referees of all time in a list maintained by the International Federation of Football History and Statistics (IFFHS). He won the Serie A Referee of the Year award for four consecutive seasons between 2006 and 2009, and was named IFFHS World's Best Referee in 2008. He retired following the 2010 FIFA World Cup to take a position with the Italian Football Federation as the referee designator for Serie B League. He was inducted into the Italian Football Hall of Fame in 2015.

Luciano Moggi, then general director of Juventus, had described Rosetti and his colleague Pierluigi Collina as being too 'objective' in an intercepted telephone call. Moggi also claimed that Rosetti and Collina should be 'punished' for decisions made against Juventus in that same phone call.

Rosetti is currently the Chief Refereeing Officer and Chairman of the Referees Committee at UEFA.

== Early and personal life ==
Rosetti was born in Turin, Piedmont, in 1967. Aside from his refereeing duties, Rosetti has also worked as a hospital manager and as a financial advisor. He is fluent in Italian (native), English, and French. He enjoys playing tennis in his free time.

== Career ==
=== Early career ===
Rosetti first began refereeing matches in 1983, at the age of 16. He offciated his first match in the Italian Serie B at the age of 29 in 1997, and the following year, he made his Serie A debut on 19 April, taking charge of a 2–0 Sampdoria victory at Napoli; he also won the "Giorgio Bernardi" Award that year, for the best young rookie referee in Serie A.

He received his FIFA Badge and made his international debut as a referee in 2002. Later that spring, he officiated at the UEFA European Under-17 Championship, including the final between Switzerland and France, with the former team prevailing 4–2 on penalties after a goalless draw. The following year, he officiated the 2003 FIFA U-20 World Cup final between Brazil and Spain, with the former nation winning 1–0.

=== Rise to prominence and Euro 2008 ===
In the summer of 2005, Rosetti took charge of three games at the FIFA Confederations Cup in Germany. The following summer, he was the only Italian referee chosen to participate in the 2006 FIFA World Cup in Germany, where he took charge of four matches, a single-tournament record for an Italian referee; standing at 1.90m, he was also the tallest official at the tournament.

Rosetti officiated the 2007 Supercoppa Italiana between Inter and Roma on 19 August, with the latter side winning 1–0. He was one of the many referees who officiated in the 2007–08 UEFA Champions League. He refereed the second leg of the semi-final between Chelsea and Liverpool at Stamford Bridge, with Chelsea winning 3–2 and advancing to the final 4–3 on aggregate.

Rosetti was selected to referee at UEFA Euro 2008 in Switzerland and Austria.

At the tournament, Rosetti was the referee for the:

- Group A opening game between co-hosts Switzerland and the Czech Republic.
- Group D game between Greece and Russia.
- Quarterfinal match between Croatia and Turkey
- Final match between Germany and Spain.

In 2008, he was named IFFHS World's Best Referee.

Rosetti was one of the many referees who officiated in the 2008–09 UEFA Champions League, including the second leg of the semi-finals, with Manchester United defeating Arsenal 3–1 at the Emirates Stadium, to advance to the final 4–1 on aggregate; during the match, Rosetti sent-off Manchester United's Darren Fletcher for a 75th-minute challenge on Cesc Fàbregas.

=== 2010 World Cup and retirement ===
Rosetti was preselected as a referee for the 2010 FIFA World Cup in South Africa. His first match of the tournament was a 1–1 draw between Ghana and Australia. Rosetti sent Australia's Harry Kewell off for handling the ball on the goal line, awarding Ghana a penalty kick. The next game he refereed was the Argentina–Mexico game in the Round of 16, which Argentina won 3–1; the match was surrounded by controversy, however, as Rosetti and his team of officials incorrectly allowed Carlos Tevez's opening goal to stand, even though replays later showed that it should have been ruled out for offside. Rosetti was later left off the list of 19 referees announced by FIFA to take part in the rest of the competition although football's world governing body did not explain why. This decision affected Rosetti greatly and was the major reason behind his immediate retirement following the tournament, although he denied that it was his error that led him to retire.

Throughout his refereeing career, Rosetti officiated three Coppa Italia finals and three consecutive UEFA Champions League semi-finals. In total, he served as a referee in the Italian top flight for 13 seasons, taking charge of 189 Italian top-flight matches, including five Milan derbies, three Rome derbies, and four Genoa derbies. He was named best Italian referee by the Association of Italian Footballers (AIC) for four consecutive years between 2006 and 2009.

=== Later career ===
Following his retirement from refereeing in 2010, Rosetti was appointed to lead a committee of the Association of Italian Referees (AIA) of Serie B.

Rosetti was hired by the Russian Football Union in 2011 to oversee the domestic referees' department but resigned in 2013 for family reasons.

In 2014, he was named the head and designator of the C.A.N. PRO (Commissione Arbitri Nazionale per la Lega Pro – the national referee commission for the third-flight of Italian football), before moving abroad.

He was inducted into the Italian Football Hall of Fame in 2015.

In 2018, UEFA announced that Rosetti would become their Chief Refereeing Officer and Chairman of the Referees Committee, succeeding Pierluigi Collina, who became chairman of FIFA's referees committee. Collina assigned Rosetti to be the VAR Refereeing Project Leader at the 2018 FIFA World Cup to help implement the VAR system.

== Major matches refereed ==
Date	Match	Tournament	Ref
29 June 2008	Germany vs Spain (0–1)	UEFA Euro 2008 Final	

== Honours ==
- Serie A Referee of the Year: 2006, 2007, 2008, 2009
- IFFHS World's Best Referee: 2008
- Italian Football Hall of Fame: 2015

Preceded by (Germany) Markus Merk	UEFA European Football Championship final match referees 2008 (Italy) Roberto Rosetti	Succeeded by (Portugal) Pedro Proença
