= Corriere dello Sport =

Italian sports daily newspaper

- Front page, 31 December 2008
- Type: Daily newspaper
- Format: Broadsheet
- Owner: Roberto Amodei
- Publisher: Corriere dello Sport S.r.l.
- Language: Italian
- Headquarters: Rome, Italy
- Circulation: 225,643 (2008)
- Website: www.corrieredellosport.it

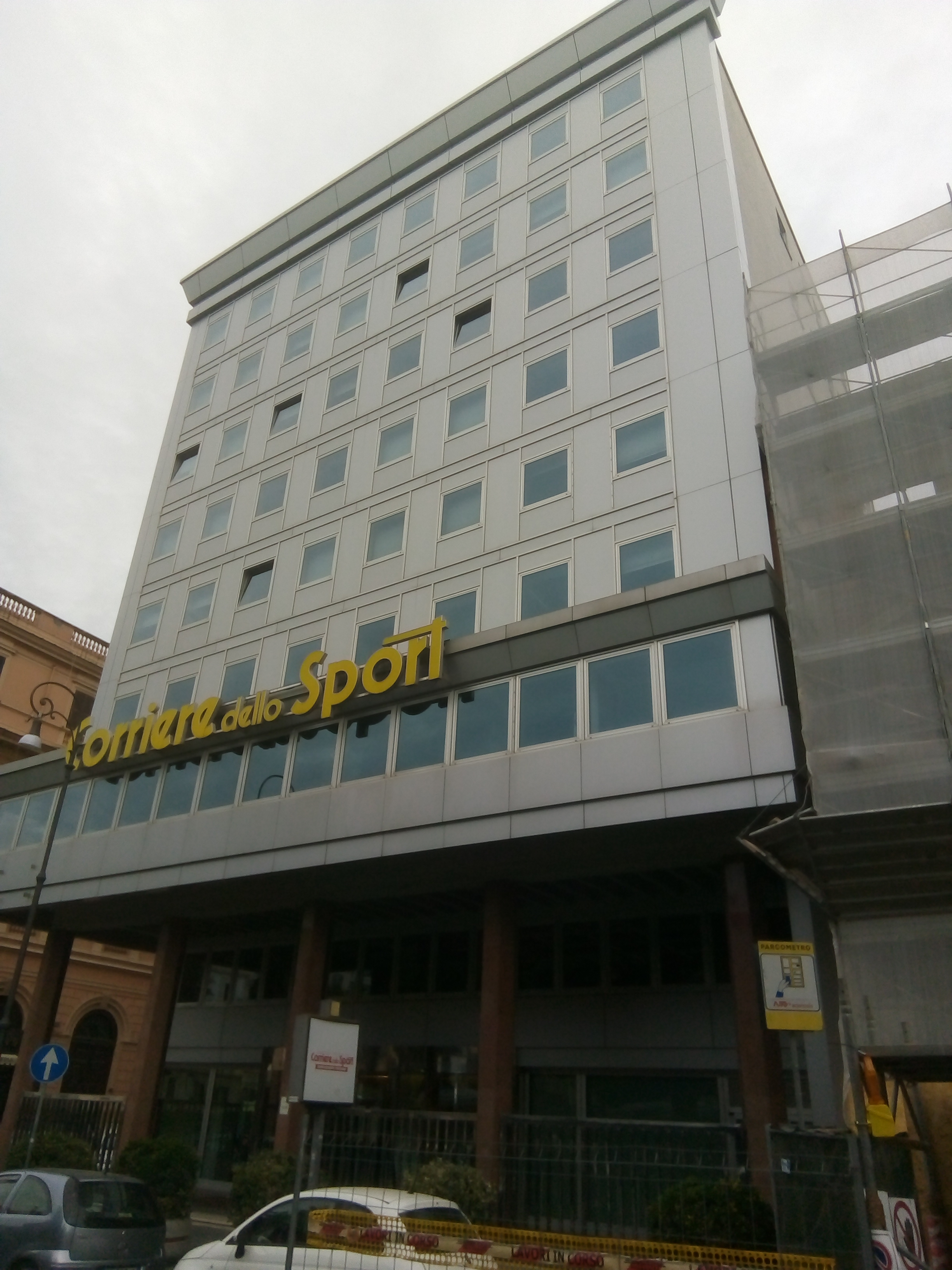
Headquarters on Piazza dell'Indipendenza, Rome

Corriere dello Sport – Stadio is an Italian national sports newspaper published in Rome. It was founded in 1924 and renamed il Littoriale by the Italian fascist regime from 1927 until July 1943. Its current name dates back to 1977 after the merging with Stadio, a sports newspaper based in Bologna. The editor of the newspaper is Ivan Zazzaroni, who has been holding the office since 2018. According to ADS, an Italian certification body for the circulation of periodical press, Corriere dello Sport's daily average circulation is approximately 80,000 copies.

== History and profile ==
Corriere dello Sport – Stadio was founded as a merger in 1977 between Corriere dello Sport (lit. 'Sports Courier'), founded in 1924, and Stadio (lit. 'Stadium'), founded in 1948. The paper is published in broadsheet format. The 2008 circulation of the paper was 225,643 copies. As of July 2015, third-party web analytics provider Alexa Internet rated its website, corrieredellosport.it, as the 91st most visited website in Italy, while Similarweb rated it the 166th most visited overall in Italy at that time, and Italy's fourth most visited sports website.

== Editors ==
- 1942 – Alberto Masprone
- 1943 – Umberto Guadagno
- 1944 – Pietro Petroselli
- 1947 – Bruno Roghi
- 1960 – Antonio Ghirelli
- 1961 – Luciano Oppo
- 1972 – Mario Gismondi
- 1976 – Giorgio Tosatti
- 1986 – Domenico Morace
- 1991 – Italo Cucci
- 1995 – Mario Sconcerti
- 2000 – Italo Cucci
- 2002 – Xavier Jacobelli
- 2003 – Alessandro Vocalelli
- 2012 – Paolo De Paola
- 2018 – Ivan Zazzaroni

== See also ==
- Media of Italy
