= Andrea Bernini =

Italian footballer (born 1973)

Personal information
- Full name: Andrea Bernini
- Date of birth: 10 June 1973 (age 53)
- Place of birth: Reggello, Italy
- Height: 1.79 m (5 ft 10 in)
- Position: Midfielder

Senior career*
Years	Team	Apps	(Gls)
1994–1995	Incisa	0	(0)
1995–1997	Sangiovannese	48	(7)
1997–1999	Montevarchi	52	(4)
1999–2001	Reggina	44	(2)
2001–2003	Sampdoria	44	(2)
2003–2004	Napoli	32	(1)
2004–2007	Perugia	83	(4)
2008–2009	Lecco	32	(1)
2009–2011	Sangiovannese	36	(3)
2011–2013	Castelnuovese		

Managerial career
- 2013–2014: Figline
- 2016: Cuneo (assistant)
- 2016–2017: Sangiovannese
- 2017–2018: Arezzo
- 2018: Arsenal Kyiv (assistant)
- * Club domestic league appearances and goals

Andrea Bernini (born 10 June 1973 in Reggello) is a retired Italian footballer.

== Career ==
Bernini started his career at Serie D clubs. At age of 24 he started his professional career at Montevarchi, a Serie C1 club. In summer 1999 he was spotted by Serie A club Reggina, where he played for 2 seasons. Bernini then played for traditional giant Sampdoria but at Serie B. He was released by the Genoa club after the team won promotion. He signed for another traditional club, Napoli, but again Napoli faced bankrupt at the end of season. In summer 2004, he was signed by newly relegated Serie B team Perugia, where he played for 3 and a half season.

In January 2008, he was signed by Lecco.

In 2009, Bernini was transferred to his original club, Sangiovannese where he began his professional career.
