= Ernesto Terra =

Italian footballer (born 1978)

Personal information
- Date of birth: 28 May 1978 (age 48)
- Place of birth: Teramo, Italy
- Height: 1.86 m (6 ft 1 in)
- Positions: Right back; central defender

Senior career*
Years	Team	Apps	(Gls)
1995–1998	RC Angolana	95	(8)
1998–2003	Sora	139	(6)
2003–2006	Catania	34	(3)
2004–2005	→ Pescara (loan)	38	(5)
2005–2006	→ Atalanta (loan)	20	(1)
2006–2010	Arezzo	86	(8)
2007–2008	→ Grosseto (loan)	35	(2)
2010–2012	Sorrento	53	(2)
2012–2013	G.C. Sora	30	(3)
2013–2014	Isola Liri	27	(2)
2014–2016	Cassino		
2016	Città Monte S. Giovanni Campano		
- * Club domestic league appearances and goals

Ernesto Terra (born 28 May 1978) is an Italian former footballer who played as a defender.

== Career ==
Terra started his career at Eccellenza side Renato Curi. He then played 5 seasons for Sere C1 side Sora. In 2003, he was signed by Calcio Catania by spent next two seasons on loan at Serie B for Pescara and Atalanta. In 2006, he was signed by Arezzo of Serie B. On 30 July 2010, he was signed for free by Sorrento after being released by Arezzo.
