= Alessandro Del Grosso =

Italian footballer (born 1972)

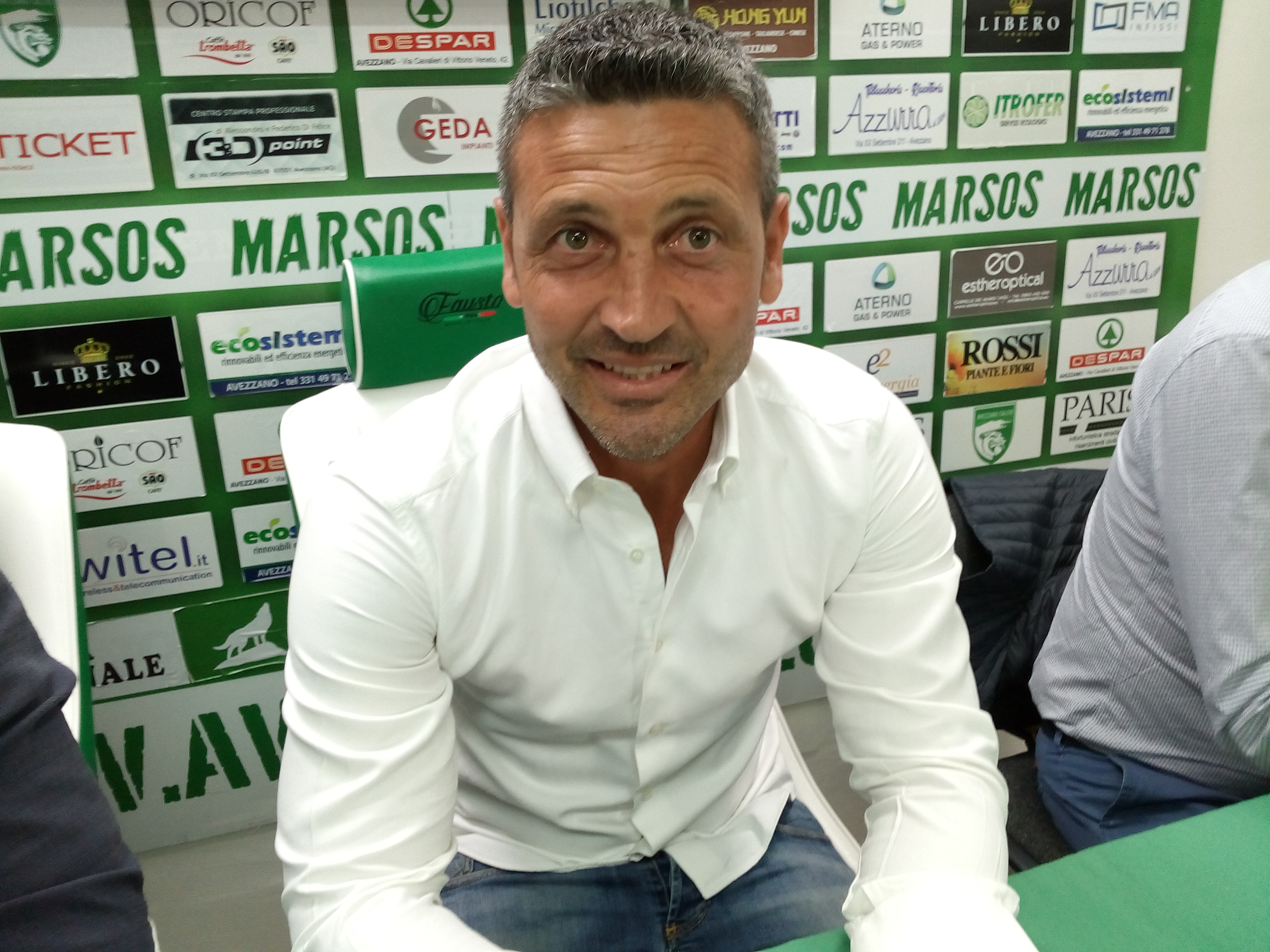

Personal information
- Date of birth: 27 August 1972 (age 54)
- Place of birth: Ardea, Italy
- Height: 1.80 m (5 ft 11 in)
- Position: Defender

Youth career
- Celano

Senior career*
Years	Team	Apps	(Gls)
1989–1991	Celano	1	(0)
1991–1993	Francavilla	51	(2)
1993–1996	Avezzano	100	(6)
1996–1999	Salernitana	74	(1)
1999–2001	Bari	49	(0)
2001–2002	Salernitana	31	(1)
2002–2004	Catania	30	(0)
2004	Napoli	19	(1)
2004–2005	Pisa	12	(0)
2005	Teramo	11	(0)
2005–2006	Chieti	14	(0)
2006	Catanzaro	13	(0)
2006–2007	Martina	13	(0)
2007–2008	Celano	36	(3)
2008–2009	Val di Sangro	32	(0)
2009–2010	Angolana	32	(0)
Total		486	(14)
- * Club domestic league appearances and goals

Alessandro Del Grosso (born 27 August 1972) is an Italian former footballer who played as a defender.

== Football career ==
=== Early years ===
Del Grosso started his career at teams of Serie C2. He followed Avezzano promoted to Serie C1 in summer 1996.

=== Salernitana & Bari ===
After played 10 matches in Serie C1 1996–97 season, he joined Salernitana of Serie B in November 1996 and followed the team promoted to Serie A in summer 1998.

After Salernitana relegated in summer 1999, he joined A.S. Bari of Serie A on free transfer. After Bari relegated, he rejoined Salernitana in summer 2001, but also at Serie B.

He played for Salernitana for a season.

=== Catania & Napoli ===
In summer 2002, he joined Calcio Catania, at that time new promoted to Serie B. He survived in relegation in summer 2003, because that season only one team relegated. He then joined S.S.C. Napoli in on 31 January 2004. But this time Napoli relegated due to financial reason, despite finished 13th in Serie B.

=== Lega Pro clubs ===
He then played for Pisa (Serie C1A), Teramo (Serie C1B), Chieti (Serie C1B). He then shortly back to Serie B for Catanzaro on 5 January 2006, but fail to avoid relegation. He then joined Martina (Serie C1B) and then his first club Celano (Serie C2) in January 2007.

He survived in relegation playoffs against Pro Vasto.
