= Daniele Russo (footballer, born 1973) =

Italian footballer (born 1973)

Personal information
- Date of birth: 3 July 1973 (age 53)
- Place of birth: Rome, Italy
- Height: 1.84 m (6 ft 0 in)
- Position: Midfielder

Team information
- Current team: Turkey (assistant coach)

Senior career*
Years	Team	Apps	(Gls)
–1994	Piombino		
1994–1995	Centense	24	(3)
1995–1996	Perugia	17	(0)
1996	Pistoiese	12	(1)
1997	Castel di Sangro	12	(1)
1997–1998	Perugia	10	(0)
1998–1999	Fidelis Andria	20	(2)
2000–2001	Viterbese	26	(6)
2001–2003	L'Aquila	58	(9)
2003–2005	Pescara	49	(8)
2005–2007	Atletico Roma	45	(4)

Managerial career
- 2011–2012: Catania (assistant)
- 2012–2015: Fiorentina (assistant)
- 2015–2016: Sampdoria (assistant)
- 2016–2017: Milan (assistant)
- 2017–2018: Sevilla (assistant)
- 2019: Fiorentina (assistant)
- 2021–2023: Adana Demirspor (assistant)
- 2023–: Turkey (assistant)
- * Club domestic league appearances and goals

Daniele Russo (born 3 July 1973) is an Italian football manager and a former player. He is the assistant manager of the Turkey national football team.

== Playing career ==
Russo started his playing career with Italian fourth division side Piombino. In 1994, he signed for Centense in the Italian third division. In 1995, Russo signed for Italian second division club Perugia, where he made 17 league appearances and scored 0 goals. In 1996, he signed for Pistoiese in the Italian third division. Before the second half of 1996–97, Russo signed for Italian second division team Castel di Sangro. In 2000, he signed for Viterbese in the Italian third division. In 2003, he signed for Italian second division outfit Pescara. In 2005, Russo signed for Italian third division side Atletico Roma.

== Managerial career ==
In 2011, Russo was appointed assistant manager of Catania in the Italian Serie A. In 2016, he was appointed assistant of Italian Serie A club Milan. In 2017, Russo was appointed assistant manager of Sevilla in Spain. In 2019, he was appointed assistant manager of Italian club Fiorentina. In 2021, Russo was appointed assistant manager of Adana Demirspor in Turkey. In 2023, Daniele Russo was appointed assistant manager of the Turkish national football team.
