= Gennaro Esposito =

Italian football player

Personal information
- Date of birth: 18 March 1985 (age 41)
- Place of birth: Naples, Italy
- Height: 1.80 m (5 ft 11 in)
- Position: Midfielder

Senior career*
Years	Team	Apps	(Gls)
2003–2004	Napoli	5	(0)
2004–2009	Siena	1	(0)
2005–2006	→ Torres (loan)	4	(1)
2006–2007	→ Juve Stabia (loan)	30	(1)
2008	→ Cesena (loan)	10	(0)
2008–2009	→ Gallipoli (loan)	32	(0)
2009–2015	Hellas Verona	73	(4)
2012–2013	→ Perugia (loan)	29	(1)
2013–2014	→ Salernitana (loan)	7	(0)
2014–2015	→ Venezia (loan)	23	(0)
2015–2016	Casalnuovese		
2016–2018	Potenza	61	(4)
2018–2019	Casarano	31	(2)
2019	Pomigliano		
2019–2020	USC Corigliano Marca	8	(0)
2020–2021	Gallipoli		
2021–2023	Givova Capri Anacapri		
- * Club domestic league appearances and goals as of 08:39, 14 February 2026 (UTC)

Gennaro Esposito (born 18 March 1985) is an Italian professional footballer who plays as a midfielder.

== Career ==
Previously Esposito played for his hometown side Napoli and made his professional debut for them in Serie B.

Since joining Siena in 2004, Esposito was loaned out twice to Torres and Juve Stabia respectively to gain experience. He eventually made his debut for Siena in Serie A against AC Milan during January 2006.

In August 2007, he was offered a new contract last until June 2010.

In August 2008 he was on loan to Gallipoli Calcio in Lega Pro Prima Divisione. He won the champion and promotion to Serie B with club.

He joined Hellas Verona at Prima Divisione in July 2009.

On 26 August 2013 he moved to Lega Pro Prima Divisione club Salernitana.

On 13 August 2018, he joined Eccellenza (fifth-tier) club Casarano.

== Honours ==
- Lega Pro Prima Divisione: 2009
