= Max Vieri =

Australian soccer player (born 1978)

Personal information
- Full name: Massimiliano Vieri
- Date of birth: 1 September 1978 (age 48)
- Place of birth: Sydney, New South Wales, Australia
- Height: 1.83 m (6 ft 0 in)
- Position: Striker

Team information
- Current team: Fiorentina (assistant youth coach)

Senior career*
Years	Team	Apps	(Gls)
1997–1999	Juventus	0	(0)
1997–1998	→ Prato (loan)	15	(1)
1998–1999	→ Fano (loan)	22	(5)
1999–2000	Brescello	30	(12)
2000–2003	Juventus	0	(0)
2000–2002	→ Ancona (loan)	61	(21)
2002–2003	→ Verona (loan)	27	(6)
2003–2004	Napoli	29	(5)
2004–2005	Ternana	18	(4)
2005–2006	Triestina	1	(0)
2006	Arezzo	7	(0)
2006–2007	Novara	29	(3)
2007–2008	Lecco	31	(7)
2008–2012	Prato	84	(19)
2013	Weymouth Wales	6	(0)
Total		360	(83)

International career
2004–2005	Australia	6	(0)
Medal record
Representing Australia
Men's Association football
OFC Nations Cup
Winner	2004 Australia
- * Club domestic league appearances and goals

Massimiliano Vieri (born 1 September 1978) is an Australian former professional soccer player who played as a striker. He is in charge as assistant youth coach for Fiorentina Under-18. Born in Sydney to Italian parents, he won six caps for the Australia national team between 2004 and 2005.

== Early life ==
Vieri is the son of player Roberto Vieri and brother of Italian star Christian Vieri. He was born in Sydney where he grew up and attended Patrician Brothers' College, Fairfield. In 1996 he and his family relocated to Italy.

== Club career ==
Vieri was sold to Brescello in co-ownership deal for 30 million lire (€15,494) in 1999. In 2000 Juventus bought back Vieri for an undisclosed fee (his brother Christian had also previously played for the club during the 1996–97 Serie A season). Vieri was loaned to Ancona for 100 million lire (€51,646) in 2000–01 season and again in 2001–02 season. In 2002 Vieri joined Verona as part of the deal of Mauro Camoranesi. Vieri's 50% registration rights were valued at 1 billion lire at that time (€516,457). In June 2003 Juventus bought back Vieri for €516,457 and bought Camoranesi outright for €5 million. In July 2003 Vieri left for S.S.C. Napoli for €500,000. In June 2004 Juventus gave up the player's remaining 50% registration rights.

After leaving Napoli in 2004, he later had a season-long spell with Ternana, followed by half-season spells with Triestina and Arezzo. In July 2007, he was signed by Lecco, after spending the previous season with Novara. After a season at the club, he joined Prato in 2008. In July 2012, he was released by the club.

== International career ==
Vieri made his international debut for Australia against Turkey in a friendly match in 2004. He received his final international call-up in 2005, totalling six appearances for his country.

== Post-playing career ==
In July 2017, he joined Empoli as assistant coach to Lamberto Zauli for the Primavera Under-19 youth team.

In 2020, Vieri joined the youth coaching staff of Fiorentina as assistant to Renato Buso in charge of the Under-18 team.

== Career statistics ==
Appearances and goals by national team and year

National team	Year	Apps	Goals
Australia	2004	5	0
Australia	2005	1	0
Total		6	0

== Honours ==
Australia

- OFC Nations Cup: 2004
