= Coverciano, Florence =

Neighborhood in Florence, Italy

Coverciano
- Neighbourhood
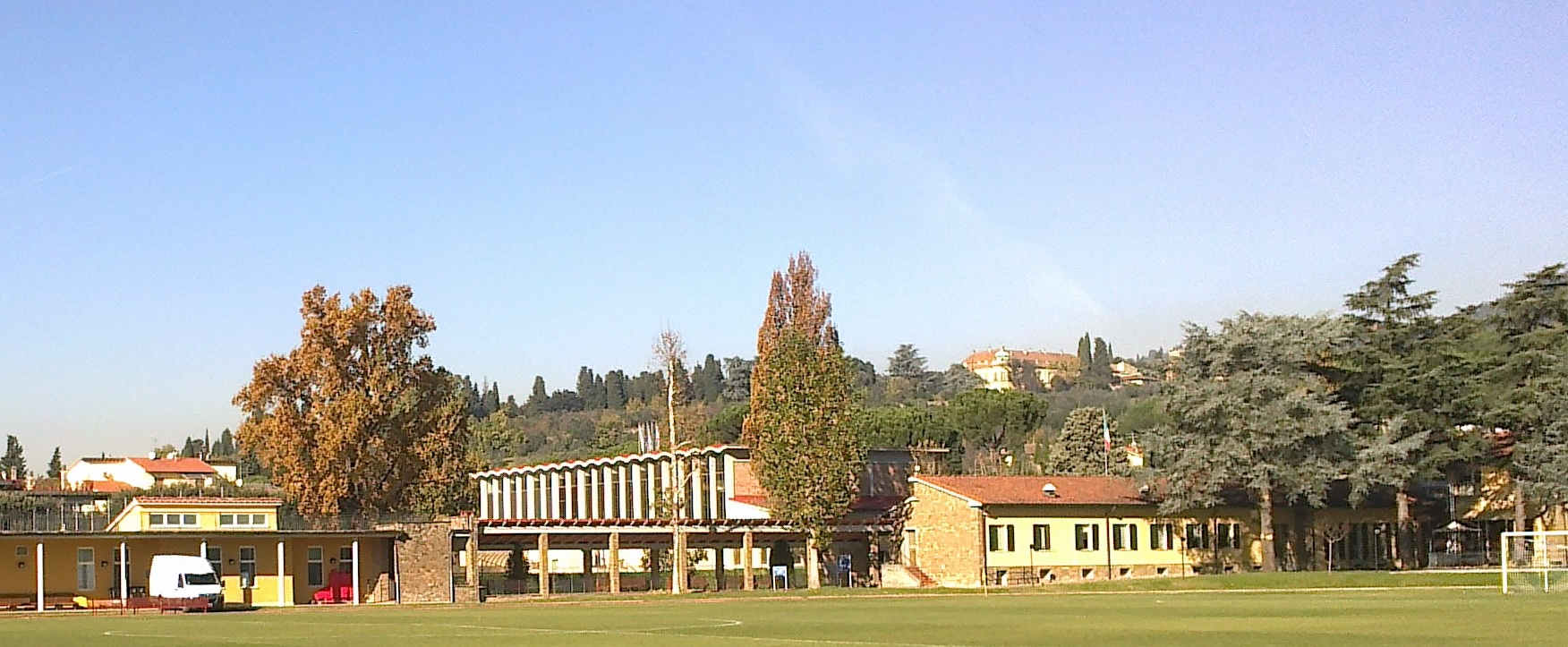
- Interactive map of Coverciano
- Country: Italy
- Region: Tuscany
- Metropolitan city: Florence
- Comune: Florence
- Quarter: 2 (Campo di Marte)
- Time zone: UTC+1 (CET)
  - Summer (DST): UTC+2 (CEST)

Coverciano (Italian: [koverˈtʃaːno]) is a neighbourhood in the southeastern part of the city of Florence, Italy.

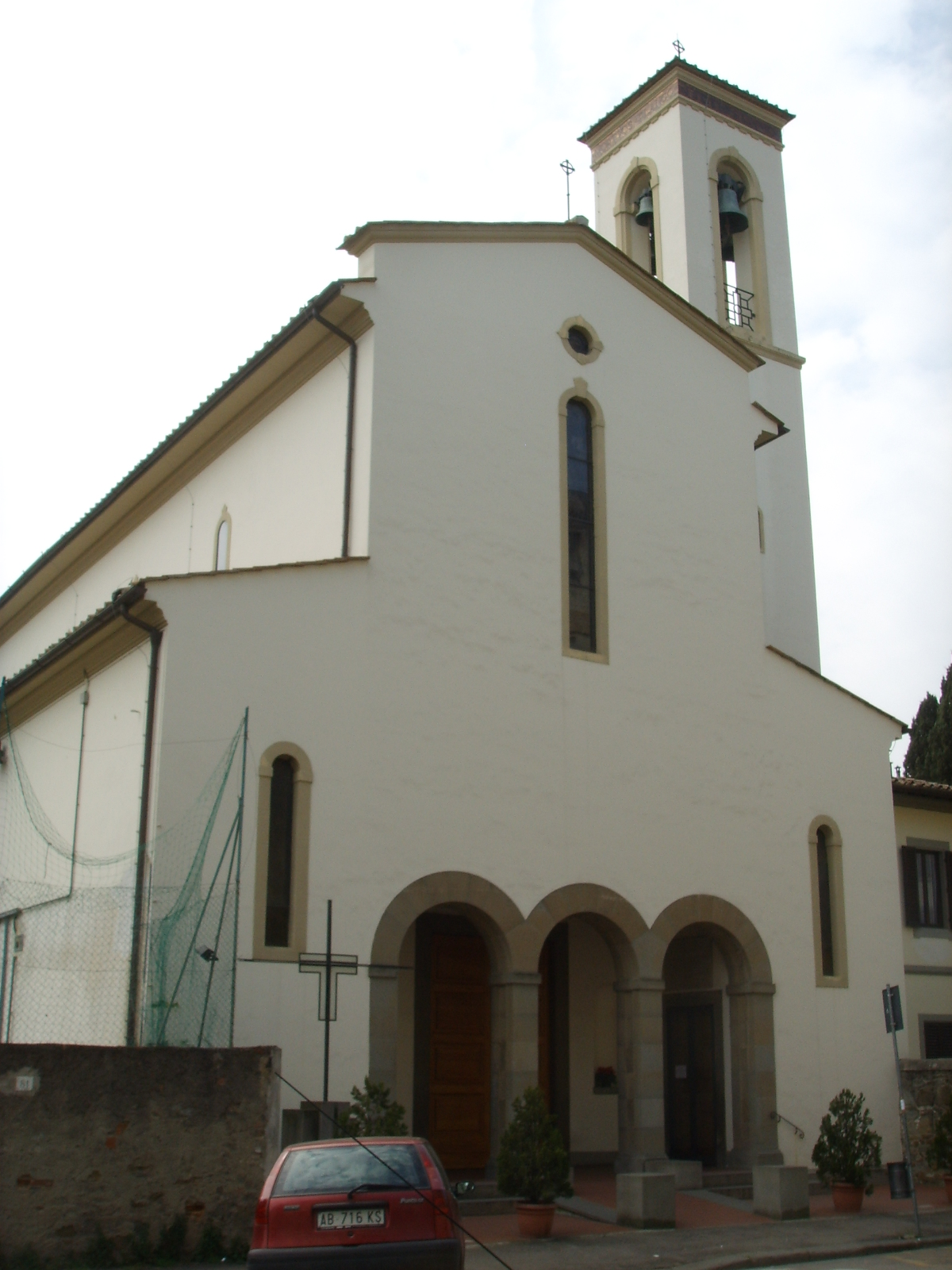
The nearby church of Santa Maria a Coverciano

The neighborhood is bordered by the Affrico and Mensola streams, by the slopes of the hills and by the Via Aretina. It is best known for the two parish churches (the church of Santa Maria in Coverciano and the church dedicated to St. Catherine of Siena), the Centro Tecnico Federale di Coverciano of the FIGC, the Museo del Calcio, the headquarters of the Italian Referees Association section of Florence and the sports judge of Florence.
