= Centro Tecnico Federale di Coverciano =

Central training ground of the Italian Football Federation

- Il Centro, Università del calcio, Casa degli azzurri
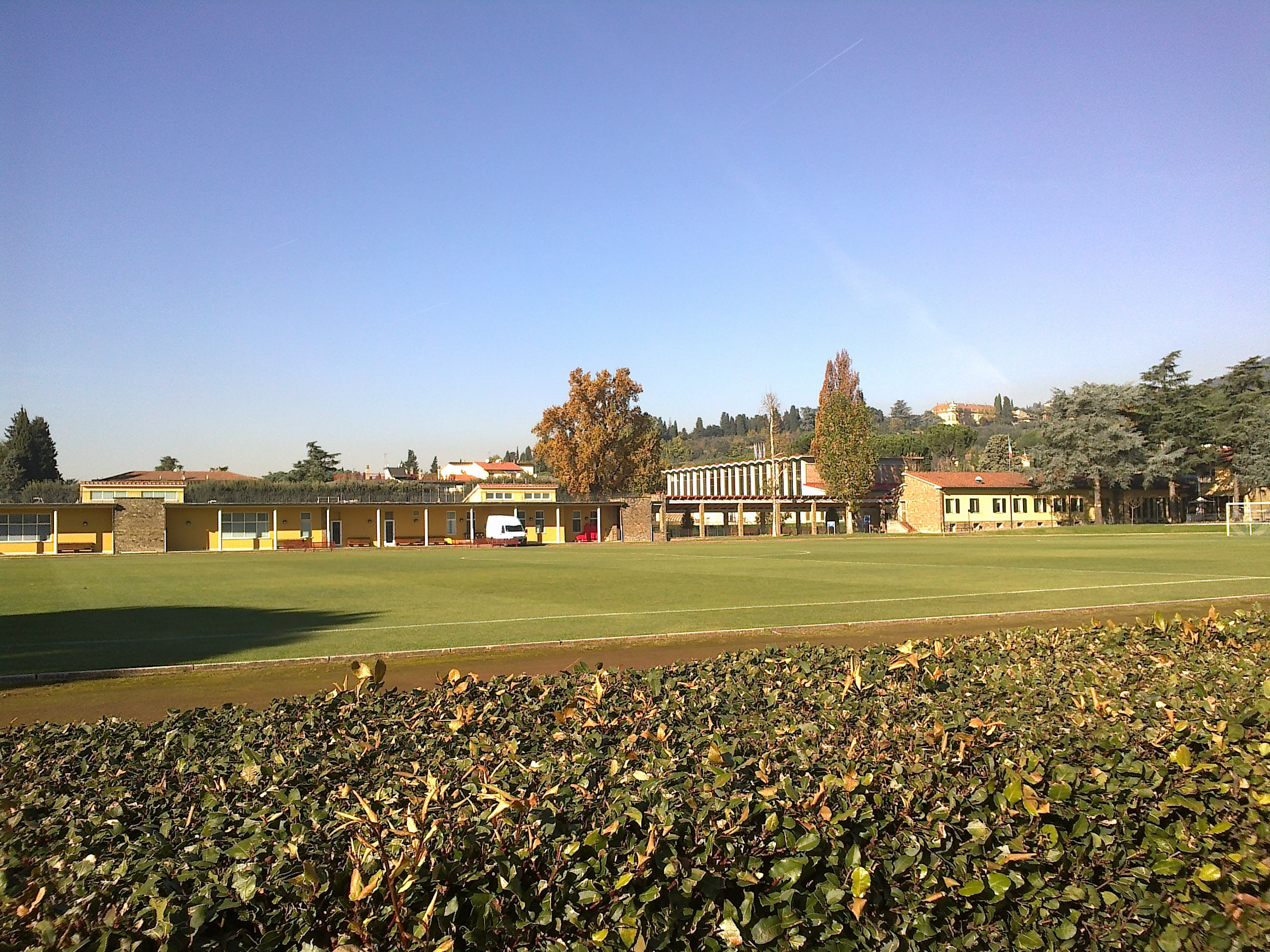
- The technical centre of the Italian Football Federation
- Interactive map of Centro Tecnico Federale di Coverciano
- Location: Coverciano, Florence, Italy
- Coordinates: 43°46′45.05″N 11°18′02.88″E
- Owner: Italian Football Federation
- Type: Football training facility

Construction
- Groundbreaking: 1953
- Opened: 1958
- Architects: Francesco Tiezzi, Arnaldo Degli Innocenti

Website
- Official website

Il Centro Tecnico Federale di Coverciano, is the central training ground and technical headquarters of the Italian Football Federation, located in the Coverciano quartiere of Florence, Italy.

== History ==
The Center was founded by Luigi Ridolfi Vay da Verrazzano and Dante Berretti and designed by architects Francesco Tiezzi and Arnaldo Degli Innocenti. The decision to build the Center in Coverciano was decided on 29 March 1952 (resolution of the Federal Council of 8 May 1951), the date of which the land was purchased by the FIGC. Just over a year later, construction work began, and was completed in October 1957. The official inauguration of the Center was on 6 November 1958, in the presence of the then-president of the FIGC, Bruno Zauli. Prior to its construction, the FIGC's technical sector (settore tecnico) was headquartered in Rome with the other departments.

== Facilities ==
The Center is known as the Casa degli azzurri (House of the national teams) as it is the primary training ground for all 19 Italy national football teams from the U-15 age group and above (including women's), as well as other Italy representative football teams. It is also known as the Università del calcio (University of football) as it hosts high-level courses for coaches, sporting directors, and trainers.

The Center hosts the Museo del Calcio, the offices of the Technical Sector, the headquarters of the Italian Football Coaches Association, the headquarters of the Regional Committee of the National Amateur League, the headquarters of the Regional Referee Committee, and the headquarters of the Italian Association of Referees section of Florence.

Facilities include:

- four football fields of regulatory measures, of which three in natural grass and one in the latest generation artificial grass;
- a "practical" field - also in the latest generation of artificial turf - of sizes 9 metres by 9 metres;
- a five-a-side football field in artificial grass;
- a brand new gym, equipped with the most modern equipment;
- a pool measuring 25 metres by 15 metres;
- two artificial grass tennis courts;
- a conference room, with a capacity of 148 seats, symbol of the training of the FIGC Technical Sector, ideal for seminars, conferences and even press conferences;
- an auditorium opened in May 2018, with 200 seats;
- a room ideal for meetings with 25 seats and an LED wall on which to project videos, images or slides;
- a library, where over 3500 texts can be found including books, articles, essays and theses from previous courses of the Federal Coaching School, covering all aspects of sport and football in particular;
- a Medical Section, finished to be renovated at the beginning of 2018, which has a physiotherapy room and two clinics;
- a hotel, with 53 double rooms;
- a room present in the same hotel, with 46 seats;
- a restaurant, with a capacity of around 150 seats;
- a bar and a retrobar room;
- a conference room inside the Museo del Calcio with 150 seats;
- a small building where the offices of the male and female Italian national technical staff are located
