= Raffaele Gragnaniello =

Italian footballer

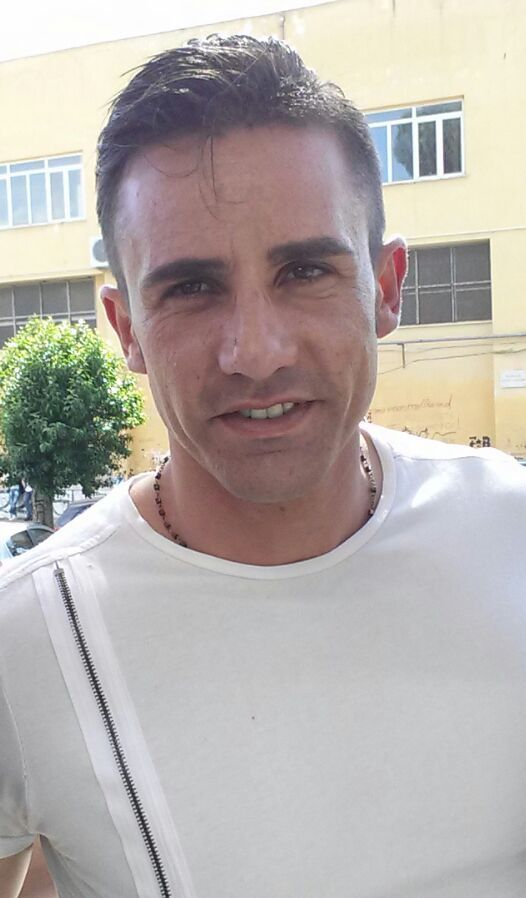

Personal information
- Full name: Raffaele Gragnaniello
- Date of birth: February 18, 1981 (age 45)
- Place of birth: Naples, Italy
- Height: 1.83 m (6 ft 0 in)
- Position: Goalkeeper

Team information
- Current team: Nola

Youth career
- 1997–2000: SSC Napoli

Senior career*
Years	Team	Apps	(Gls)
2000–2001	→ Puteolana	1	(0)
2001–2003	Napoli	3	(0)
2003–2006	Giugliano	100	(0)
2006–2009	Avellino	82	(0)
2009–2010	Potenza	9	(0)
2010	→ Lecce	3	(0)
2010–2011	Neapolis Mugnano	30	(0)
2011–2013	Aversa Normanna	60	(0)
2013–2014	Nocerina	6	(0)
2014–2015	Savoia	20	(0)
2015–2016	Casertana	34	(0)
2016–2017	Melfi	38	(0)
2017–2018	Casertana	0	(0)
2018–	Nola		

International career
2009-2012	Two Sicilies	?	(0)
- * Club domestic league appearances and goals as of 15 May 2018

Raffaele Gragnanieillo (born February 18, 1981) is an Italian footballer who plays as a goalkeeper for Serie D club Nola.

== Club career ==
=== SSC Napoli ===
Raffaele Gragnaniello began his career in the youth ranks of Serie A side SSC Napoli. He played for the Primavera youth team between 1997 and 2000, before he was loaned out to ASD Atletico Puteolana for the 2000–2001 season. He played just one match for the club. He returned to Napoli in the summer of 2001, and remained at the club until 2003, during the period in which the club were in downfall. He was, however, only a reserve keeper and made just 3 appearances in those two seasons.

=== SSC Giugliano ===
Gragnaniello moved to Serie C club SSC Giugliano in 2003, and he would go on to be the club's starting keeper, appearing 100 times in league play and allowing just 60 goals domestically. He played at the club until 2006.

=== US Avellino ===
In 2006, Raffaele moved back to the Napoli area, with US Avellino 1912, a club playing in the Serie B at the time. He would also obtain a starting position with the southern Italian team, and would make over 100 total appearances for the club between the league, Coppa Italia, and friendly matches. It was during his time with US Avellino where he gained the most recognition of his career. After US Avellino's bankruptcy, Gragnaniello would go on to leave the club, eventually joining Potenza SC, in the Lega Pro Prima Divisione.

=== Potenza SC ===
After signing for Potenza SC in August 2009, Gragnaniello would start the season as the starting keeper making 10 appearances for the club, but in January 2010, he signed for Serie B club US Lecce on loan, as the club searched for a quality reserve keeper as a back-up to Antonio Rosati. During his loan stint, he made 3 appearances for the club, and helped them to promotion to Serie A, following their Serie B title. In June 2010, the player returned to Potenza, but during the same transfer window was sold to F.C. Neapolis Mugnano in the Lega Pro Seconda Divisione.

=== Later career ===
On 16 December 2010, the player began his new adventure with newly promoted Lega Pro Seconda Divisione side F.C. Neapolis Mugnano. After just one season, and 30 league appearances, the veteran goalkeeper was released and became a free agent. He was signed on a free transfer by fellow Lega Pro Seconda Divisione club Aversa Normanna ahead of the 2011-12 Lega Pro Prima Divisione and has since made 60 league appearances two seasons with the club as the starting goalkeeper.

In 2015, he was signed by Casertana.

== International career ==
Gragnaniello also played for the Italy U-18 national side in 1999, appearing 3 times for his country.

Gragnaniello received a call-up for the Two Sicilies national football team ahead of the 2010 Viva World Cup.
