= Giovanni Mauro =

Italian football referee

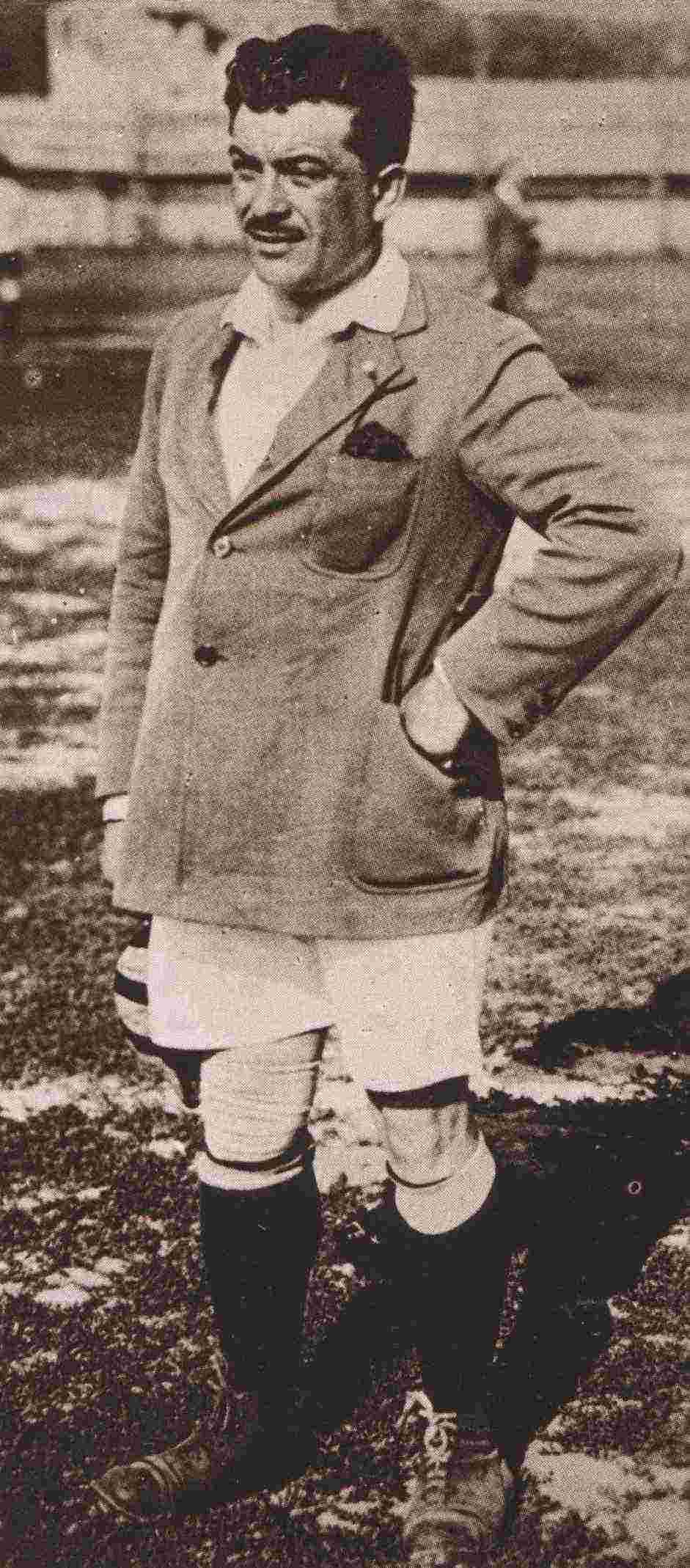
- Born: 21 July 1888; Domodossola, Italy
- Died: 12 May 1958 (aged 69); Milan, Italy
- Other occupation: Lawyer

International
Years	League	Role
1920–1928	FIFA-listed	Referee

Giovanni Mauro (21 July 1888 – 12 May 1958) was an Italian footballer, sports administrator, and referee.

He played friendly games only for A.C. Milan from 1909 to 1911.

He was an elite referee from 1911 to 1917. On 7 June 1925, he served as a referee in one of the finals between Genoa and Bologna of the 1924–25 Prima Divisione (Northern League).

He also refereed 23 times at international level, including two matches at the Olympic Games: Spain–Sweden at the 1920 Summer Olympics on 1 September 1920 and Egypt–Portugal at the 1928 Summer Olympics on 3 June 1928.

He was President of the Italian Referees Association from 1920 to 1927.

The Premio Giovanni Mauro ("Giovanni Mauro Award") – one of the most prestigious awards given to the referee considered to have performed the best during each Serie A season – is dedicated to his name. In 2011, he was inducted into the Italian Football Hall of Fame.

== Honours ==
- Italian Football Hall of Fame: 2011
