= 2023–24 Virtus Verona season =

Virtus Verona
2023–24 season
- Chairman: Luigi Fresco
- Manager: Luigi Fresco
- Stadium: Stadio Gavagnin Nocini
- Serie C: Ongoing
- Coppa Italia Serie C: Pre-season

The 2023–24 season is Virtus Verona's 103rd season in existence and third consecutive season in the Serie C. They are also competing in the Coppa Italia Serie C.

== Players ==
=== First-team squad ===
As of 29 August 2023.

Note: Flags indicate national team as defined under FIFA eligibility rules; some limited exceptions apply. Players may hold more than one non-FIFA nationality.

No.	Pos.	Nation	Player
3	DF	ITA	Francesco Mazzolo
6	DF	ITA	Manuel Daffara
7	FW	ITA	Andrea Nalini
8	MF	ITA	Gianmarco Begheldo
10	FW	ITA	Domenico Danti
11	DF	ITA	Gianni Manfrin
13	DF	ITA	Marco Ruggero
21	FW	ARG	Juanito
22	GK	GAM	Sheikh Sibi
27	DF	ITA	Carlo Faedo
30	MF	ITA	Leonardo Zarpellon
34	DF	ITA	Edoardo Olivieri
39	MF	ITA	Filippo Vesentini

No.	Pos.	Nation	Player
90	FW	ITA	Matteo Casarotto
—	GK	ITA	Michele Voltan
—	GK	ITA	Alberto Zecchin
—	DF	ITA	Eddy Cabianca
—	DF	ITA	Edoardo Iurato
—	DF	ITA	Riccardo Lodovici
—	DF	ITA	Michael Ntube
—	MF	SLO	Elian Demirović
—	MF	ITA	Dino Mehic
—	MF	ITA	Antonio Metlika
—	MF	ITA	Francesco Toffanin
—	FW	ITA	Alessio Menato
—	FW	ITA	Gianmarco Zigoni

== Transfers ==
=== In ===
Pos.	Player	Transferred from	Fee	Date	Source

=== Out ===
Pos.	Player	Transferred to	Fee	Date	Source

== Pre-season and friendlies ==
Win Draw Loss Fixtures

Friendly	(Italy)	v	(Italy)
--:-- CEST (UTC+2)

== Competitions ==
=== Overall record ===
Competition	First match	Last match	Starting round	Final position	Record							
Competition	First match	Last match	Starting round	Final position	Pld	W	D	L	GF	GA	GD	Win %
Serie C	3 September 2023	28 April 2024	Matchday 1		16	7	3	6	19	20	−1	43.75
Coppa Italia Serie C	3 October 2023		First round	First round	1	0	0	1	0	1	−1	0.00
Total					17	7	3	7	19	21	−2	41.18

Last updated: 2 December 2023
Source: Soccerway

=== Serie C ===
==== League table ====
Pos	Team	Pld	W	D	L	GF	GA	GD	Pts	Qualification
9	Lumezzane	38	15	8	15	49	48	+1	53 (Note: Giana Erminio and Pro Vercelli are ahead of Lumezzane on head-to-head points: Giana Erminio 9, Pro Vercelli 9, Lumezzane 0. Giana Erminio are ahead of Pro Vercelli on head-to-head goal difference: Giana Erminio +2, Pro Vercelli -2.)	Group play-offs 1st round
10	Trento	38	13	12	13	34	37	−3	51	Group play-offs 1st round
11	Virtus Verona	38	12	11	15	35	43	−8	47	
12	Pro Patria	38	12	10	16	37	51	−14	46	
13	AlbinoLeffe	38	10	15	13	34	37	−3	45 (Note: Albinoleffe are ahead of Renate on head-to-head points: Albinoleffe 8, Pergolettese 5, Renate 2.)	

Updated to match(es) played on 28 April 2024. Source: Lega Pro, Soccerway (in English)
Rules for classification: 1) Points; 2) Head-to-head points; 3) Head-to-head goal difference; 4) Goal difference; 5) Goals scored; 6) Lower goals against; 7) Wins; 8) Lower losses; 9) Away wins; 10) Lower home losses.
(Note: Head-to-head record is used only after all the matches between the teams in question have been played)

==== Results summary ====
Overall								Home						Away					
Pld	W	D	L	GF	GA	GD	Pts	W	D	L	GF	GA	GD	W	D	L	GF	GA	GD
16	7	3	6	19	20	−1	24	3	2	3	9	9	0	4	1	3	10	11	−1

Last updated: 2 December 2023.
Source: Worldfootball

==== Results by round ====
Round	1	2
Ground	A	H
Result	W	W
Position	4	1

Updated to match(es) played on 10 September 2023. Source: Worldfootball
A = Away; H = Home; W = Win; D = Draw; L = Loss

==== Matches ====
The league fixtures were unveiled on 7 August 2023.

3 September 2023 1	Atalanta U23	2–3	Virtus Verona	Bergamo
16:15 CEST (UTC+2)	Cissé 15'; Ngock 90+2' (pen.)	Report	Casarotto 45', 61'; Manfrin 76'	Stadium: Gewiss Stadium; Referee: Gabriele Totaro

10 September 2023 2	Virtus Verona	2–1	Alessandria	Verona
16:15 CEST (UTC+2)	Faedo 36'; Cabianca 54'	Report	Gazoul 47'	Stadium: Stadio Gavagnin-Nocini; Referee: Lorenzo Maccarini
