= Daffara =

Daffara is an Italian surname. Notable people with the surname include:

- Stefanie Daffara (born 1995), Australian cricket player
- Giovanni Daffara (born 2004), Italian footballer
- Manuel Daffara (born 1989), Italian footballer
