= Tommaso Chiecchi =

Italian footballer

Personal information
- Date of birth: 12 November 1979 (age 46)
- Place of birth: Zevio, Italy
- Height: 1.87 m (6 ft 2 in)
- Position: Defender

Team information
- Current team: Virtus Verona (head coach)

Senior career*
Years	Team	Apps	(Gls)
1997–2003	Chievo	22	(1)
1998–1999	→ Brescello (loan)	33	(0)
1999–2000	→ SPAL (loan)	26	(0)
2000–2001	→ Lucchese (loan)	6	(0)
2001–2002	→ Lumezzane (loan)	26	(3)
2003	→ Varese (loan)	10	(0)
2003–2004	Foggia	32	(0)
2004–2005	Vittoria	19	(0)
2005–2006	Modena	18	(0)
2006–2010	Chievo	6	(0)
2006–2007	→ Modena (loan)	16	(0)
2008–2009	→ Lumezzane (loan)	16	(3)
2009–2010	→ Pro Patria (loan)	22	(0)
2010–2011	Lecco	29	(0)
2011–2012	Sarego	31	(3)

International career
1995	Italy U15	7	(0)
1995	Italy U16	1	(0)

Managerial career
- 2014–2021: GSD Ambrosiana
- 2021–2022: Caldiero Terme
- 2026: Virtus Verona
- * Club domestic league appearances and goals

Tommaso Chiecchi (born 12 November 1979) is an Italian former professional footballer who played as a defender. He was most recently the head coach of Virtus Verona.

== Playing career ==
Chiecchi started his career at his native club Chievo, but after playing 22 Serie B games, he was loaned to various Serie C1 clubs for 4 1/2 seasons (first half of 2002–03 season remained in Chievo) and sold to Foggia and Vittoria (both from Serie C1) in a co-ownership deal until July 2005 staying in Modena of Serie B. He was bought back by Chievo by terminating the co-ownership deal in June 2006, which Chievo also gave the remained 50% registration rights for Cristian Bucchi to Modena. He was loaned back to Modena on 13 July, along with Simone Bentivoglio.

After failing to protect the Serie A seat, Chievo recalled Chiecchi on 1 July 2007 for their Serie B campaign, he was awarded the no.3 shirt but he was rarely used. Chiecchi was loaned to the Lega Pro 1st Division for Lumezzane along with Amedeo Calliari in July 2008 after Chievo was promoted back to Serie A.

In 2009, he remained at Prima Divisione, for Pro Patria. On 20 July 2010, he was transferred to Lecco for free.

In the summer of 2011, he was signed by Serie D club Sarego, a club from his home region Veneto. He followed the club relegated to Eccellenza Veneto in 2012.

== Coaching career ==
In 2014, Chiecchi became head coach of Eccellenza amateurs Ambrosiana, with whom he won promotion to Serie D in 2017. He then served as head coach of Caldiero Terme in the 2021–22 season, before joining Virtus Verona as assistant coach to manager/chairman Luigi Fresco.

On 5 March 2026, Chiecchi was promoted to head coach, following Fresco's decision to leave after 44 years in charge.

On 24 March 2026, it was announced that Chiecchi had stepped down as Fresco returned to his role as manager, just 19 days after his appointment.

== Honours ==
Chievo

- Serie B: 2007–08
