= List of football managers with the most matches =

This is a list of football managers that have managed the most matches, including those with 1,000 or more matches. The list includes managers' total matches, comprising club domestic league and cup, continental and global tallies, plus all FIFA-certified international matches (both competitive and friendly).

Alex Ferguson, who took charge of a total of 2,155 competitive matches between 1974 and 2013, holds the world record for the most matches as a manager, starting with East Stirlingshire in Scotland and finishing with an enormously successful 27-year spell as manager of Manchester United, also including an interim spell as manager of the Scotland national football team during the mid-1980s. His long-time rival at Arsenal, Arsène Wenger, is sixth on the list with 1,785 matches, most of which were during his 22-year spell with the Gunners. Dario Gradi, of dual English and Italian heritage, took charge of 1,557 Football League matches in a 33-year career which took in spells with Wimbledon, Crystal Palace and three spells – totalling 1,359 matches – in 28 years at Crewe Alexandra. (Note: Some sources claim that the Uruguayan manager Orlando de León managed more than 2,000 matches, but there is no reliable source confirming this achievement.)

Ignacio Trelles, Luiz Felipe Scolari, Roy Hodgson, Dick Advocaat, Mário Zagallo, Miroslav Blažević and Giovanni Trapattoni are managers of both 1,000 or more club matches and 100 or more national team matches.

== List ==
As of matches played 6 September 2026

Managers that are still active are highlighted in bold.

Rank	Manager	Team(s) (years)	Pld	W	D	L	Win%	Refs
1	(Scotland) Alex Ferguson	• East Stirlingshire (1974) • St Mirren (1974–1978) • Scotland (1985–1986) • Aberdeen (1978–1986) • Manchester United (1986–2013)	2,155	1,253	490	412	58.14	
2	(England) Neil Warnock	• Gainsborough Trinity (1980–1981) • Burton Albion (1981–1986) • Scarborough (1986–1989) • Notts County (1989–1993) • Torquay United (1993, 2026) • Huddersfield Town (1993–1995, 2023) • Plymouth Argyle (1995–1997) • Oldham Athletic (1997–1998) • Bury (1998–1999) • Sheffield United (1999–2007) • Crystal Palace (2007–2010, 2014) • Queens Park Rangers (2010–2012, 2015) • Leeds United (2012–2013) • Rotherham United (2016) • Cardiff City (2016–2019) • Middlesbrough (2020–2021) • Aberdeen (2024)	2,003	821	529	653	40.99	
3	(England) John Still	• Peterborough United (1994–1995) • Barnet (1997–2000, 2001–2002, 2018) • Dagenham & Redbridge (2004–2013, 2015–2018) • Luton Town (2013–2015) • Maidstone United (2019–2020)	1,983	829	466	688	38.26	?
4	(England) Roly Howard	• Marine (1972–2005)	1,975	?	?	?	?	
5	(Germany) Walter Fritzsch	• BSG Zentra Wismut Aue (1950–1952) • BSG Empor Lauter (1952–1953) • BSG Motor Dessau (1953–1955) • SC Motor Karl-Marx-Stadt (1956–1957) • BSG Stahl Riesa (1958, 1965–1969) • SC Empor Rostock (1959–1965) • Dynamo Dresden (1969–1978)	1,900	1,163	?	?	?	
6	(Brazil) Nelsinho Baptista	• São Bento (1985) • Ponte Preta (1985, 1987, 2000–2001, 2007, 2024) • Mogi Mirim (1986) • Inter de Limeira (1986–1987) • Athletico Paranaense (1987–1988) • Sporting Club (1989) • América-SP (1989) • Novorizontino (1990) • Corinthians (1990–1991, 1992–1993, 1996–1997, 2007) • Guarani (1991) • Palmeiras (1991–1992) • Al Hilal (1994) • Tokyo Verdy (1995–1996) • Internacional (1996) • Cruzeiro (1997) • São Paulo (1998, 2001–2002) • Colo-Colo (1999) • Portuguesa (2000) • Goiás (2002–2003) • Flamengo (2003) • São Caetano (2003, 2006) • Nagoya Grampus (2003–2005) • Santos (2005) • Sport Recife (2008–2009, 2018) • Kashiwa Reysol (2009–2015, 2019–2023) • Vissel Kobe (2015–2017)	1,888	847	482	559	44.86	?
7	(Brazil) Vanderlei Luxemburgo	• Campo Grande (1983) • Rio Branco-ES (1983) • Friburguense (1984) • Al-Ittihad (1984) • Democrata-GV (1985) • America-RJ (1987) • Al-Shabab (1987–1988) • Bragantino (1988–1990) • Flamengo (1991, 1995, 2010–2012, 2014–2015) • Guarani (1991) • Ponte Preta (1992–1993) • Palmeiras (1993–1994, 1995–1996, 2001–2002, 2007–2009, 2019–2020) • Paraná (1995) • Santos (1996–1997, 2004, 2005–2007, 2009) • Corinthians (1997–1998, 2001, 2023) • Brazil (1998–2000) • Cruzeiro (2002–2004, 2015, 2021) • Real Madrid (2004–2005) • Atlético Mineiro (2009–2010) • Grêmio (2012–2013) • Fluminense (2013) • Tianjin Quanjian (2015–2016) • Sport Recife (2017) • Vasco da Gama (2019, 2020–2021)	1,860	938	483	439	50.43	?
8	(Brazil) **Paulo Autuori**	• Portuguesa-RJ (1975–1979) • America-RJ (1979–1981) • São Bento (1982–1984) • Marília (1985) • Bonsucesso (1985) • Botafogo (1986, 1995, 1998, 2001, 2020) • Vitória de Guimarães (1986–1987, 1989–1991, 2000) • Nacional (1987–1989) • Marítimo (1991–1995) • Benfica (1996–1997) • Cruzeiro (1997, 1999–2000, 2007, 2023) • Flamengo (1997–1998) • Internacional (1999) • Santos (1999) • Alianza Lima (2001) • Sporting Cristal (2002, 2025–2026) • Peru (2003–2005) • São Paulo (2005, 2013) • Kashima Antlers (2006) • Al-Rayyan (2007–2009, 2009–2011) • Grêmio (2009) • Qatar Olympic (2011–2012) • Qatar (2012–2013) • Vasco da Gama (2013) • Atlético Mineiro (2014) • Cerezo Osaka (2015) • Atlético Paranaense (2016–2017, 2020–2021, 2021) • Ludogorets Razgrad (2018) • Atlético Nacional (2019, 2022–2023) • Fortaleza (2026–present)	1,792	717	503	572	40.01	?
9	(France) Arsène Wenger	• Nancy (1984–1987) • Monaco (1987–1994) • Nagoya Grampus Eight (1995–1996) • Arsenal (1996–2018)	1,785	958	419	408	53.7	
10	(Brazil) **Hélio dos Anjos**	• Joinville (1988-1989, 1992) • Avaí (1989–1990) • Catanduvense (1990) • Juventude (1990-1991, 2001, 2005-2006) • Vitória (1991, 1996, 1998, 2004) • Ceará (1991-1992) • Sãocarlense (1992) • Novorizontino (1993) • Náutico (1993, 2006-2007, 2020-2021, 2021-2022, 2025-present) • Santo André (1993-1994) • Athletico Paranaense (1994) • XV de Piracicaba (1994) • Remo (1995) • Goiás (1995, 1999-2000, 2001-2002, 2008-2010, 2015, 2017-2018) • Sport Recife (1996–1997, 2003–2004, 2011) • Grêmio (1997) • América Mineiro (1998) • Vasco da Gama (2001) • Guarani (2001) • Gama (2002) • Paysandu (2002-2003, 2019-2020, 2023-2024) • Fortaleza (2004, 2005, 2006, 2013) • Bahia (2005) • São Caetano (2006) • Saudi Arabia (2007-2008) • Al-Nasr (2010) • Vila Nova (2010-2011, 2011) • Goianiense (2011-2012, 2012, 2014) • Figueirense (2012) • Caxias (2015) • ABC (2015) • Najran (2015-2016) • Al Faisaly (2016) • Al Qadsiah (2016-2017) • Ponte Preta (2022-2023) • CRB (2024)	1,756	770	493	493	43.85	?
11	(France) Guy Roux	• Auxerre (1961–2005) • Lens (2007)	1,754	817	424	513	46.58	?
12	(England) Jim Smith	• Boston United (player-manager) (1969–1972) • Colchester United (player-manager) (1972–1975) • Blackburn Rovers (1975–1978) • Birmingham City (1978–1982) • Oxford United (1982–1985, 2006–2007, 2008) • Queens Park Rangers (1985–1988) • Newcastle United (1988–1991) • Portsmouth (1991–1995) • Derby County (1995–2001)	1,749	722	471	556	41.41	
13	(England) Graham Turner	• Shrewsbury Town (1978–1984) • Aston Villa (1984–1986) • Wolverhampton Wanderers (1986–1994) • Hereford United (1995–2009) • Shrewsbury Town (2010–2014)	1,718	682	463	573	39.70	
14	(England) Barry Fry	• Dunstable Town (1974–1976) • Hillingdon Borough (1976–1977) • Bedford Town (1977–1978) • Barnet (1978–1985, 1986–1993) • Southend United (1993) • Birmingham City (1993–1996) • Peterborough United (1996–2005, 2006)	1,712	702	421	589	?	?
15	(Northern Ireland) Ronnie McFall	• Glentoran (1979–1984, 2018–2019) • Portadown (1986–2016)	1,694	887	326	481	52.36	?
16	(Brazil) Levir Culpi	• Juventude (1986) • Caxias (1986) • Athletico Paranaense (1986–1987, 2004) • Marcílio Dias (1988) • Inter de Limeira (1988, 1989, 1990, 1991) • Criciúma (1989–1990, 1992) • Coritiba (1991) • Al-Ettifaq (1992) • Paraná (1993) • Guarani (1994) • Atlético Mineiro (1994–1995, 2001, 2006–2007, 2014–2015, 2018–2019) • Portuguesa (1995) • Cruzeiro (1996, 1998–1999, 2005) • Cerezo Osaka (1997, 2007–2011, 2012–2013, 2018, 2021) • São Paulo (2000) • Sport Recife (2001) • Palmeiras (2002) • Botafogo (2003–2004) • São Caetano (2005) • Fluminense (2016) • Santos (2017)	1,679	794	451	434	?	?
17	(Romania) Mircea Lucescu	• Corvinul Hunedoara (1979–1982) • Romania (1981–1986, 2024–2026) • Dinamo București (1985–1990) • Pisa (1990–1991) • Brescia (1991–1995, 1995–1996) • Reggiana (1996) • Rapid București (1997–1998, 1999–2000) • Inter Milan (1999) • Galatasaray (2000–2002) • Beşiktaş (2002–2004) • Shakhtar Donetsk (2004–2016) • Zenit Saint Petersburg (2016–2017) • Turkey (2017–2019) • Dynamo Kyiv (2020–2023)	1,668	982	330	356	58.87	
18	(Scotland) Bill Struth	• Rangers (1920–1954)	1,655	1,134	296	224	68.52	
19	(Brazil) Luiz Felipe Scolari	• CSA (1982) • Juventude (1982–1983, 1986–1987) • Brasil de Pelotas (1983) • Al-Shabab (1984–1985) • Pelotas (1986) • Gremio (1987–1988, 1993–1996, 2014–2015, 2021, 2026) • Goiás (1988) • Al-Qadisiya (1988–1990) • Kuwait (1990) • Coritiba (1990) • Criciúma (1991) • Júbilo Iwata (1997) • Palmeiras (1998–2000, 2010–2012, 2018–2019) • Cruzeiro (2000–2001, 2020–2021) • Brazil (2001–2002, 2012–2014) • Portugal (2003–2008) • Chelsea (2008–2009) • Bunyodkor (2009–2010) • Guangzhou (2015–2017) • Athletico Paranaense (2022) • Atlético Mineiro (2023–2024)	1,648	817	450	381	49.57	?
20	(Chile) **Manuel Pellegrini**	• Universidad de Chile (1988–1989) • Palestino (1990–1991, 1998) • O'Higgins (1992–1993) • Universidad Católica (1994–1996) • LDU Quito (1999–2000) • San Lorenzo (2001–2002) • River Plate (2002–2003) • Villarreal (2004–2009) • Real Madrid (2009–2010) • Málaga (2010–2013) • Manchester City (2013–2016) • Hebei China Fortune (2016–2018) • West Ham United (2018–2019) • Real Betis (2020–present)	1,614	769	396	449	47.65	
21	(Scotland) Willie Maley	• Celtic (1897–1940)	1,612	1,039	315	258	64.45	
22	(Colombia) Gabriel Ochoa Uribe	• Millonarios (1958–1960, 1961–1964, 1970–1977) • Colombia (1963, 1985) • Santa Fe (1966) • América de Cali (1979–1991)	1,597	?	?	?	?	?
23	(England) **Nigel Clough**	• Burton Albion (1998–2009, 2015–2020) • Derby County (2009–2013) • Sheffield United (2013–2015) • Mansfield Town (2020–present)	1,592	647	323	622	40.6	
24	(England) Alec Stock	• Yeovil Town (1946–1949) • Leyton Orient (1949–1956, 1956–1957, 1957–1959) • Roma (1957) • Queens Park Rangers (1959–1968) • Luton Town (1968–1972) • Fulham (1972–1976) • Bournemouth (1979–1980)	1,584	664	400	520	41.92	
25	(Brazil) Abel Braga	• Botafogo (1985, 2001–2002, 2002) • Internacional (1988–1989, 1991, 1995, 2005–2007, 2007–2008, 2013–2014, 2020–2021, 2025) • Famalicão (1989–1991, 1993–1994) • Belenenses (1991–1993) • Rio Ave (1994) • Vitória de Setúbal (1994–1995) • Vasco da Gama (1995, 2000, 2019–2020) • Guarani (1997) • Atlético Paranaense (1997–1998, 2002) • Coritiba (1999) • Paraná (1999–2000) • Marseille (2000) • Atlético Mineiro (2001) • Ponte Preta (2002–2003) • Flamengo (2003–2004, 2019) • Fluminense (2004–2005, 2011–2013, 2016–2018, 2021–2022) • Al Jazira (2008–2011, 2015) • Cruzeiro (2019) • Lugano (2021)	1,564	723	408	433	46.23	?
26	(Brazil) Givanildo Oliveira	• Sport Recife (1983–1984, 1991–1992, 1995–1996, 2006, 2009–2010) • Confiança (1984) • Central (1984–1985, 1993) • Náutico (1985, 1996, 2002–2003, 2016) • ABC (1985–1986, 2012–2013) • CRB (1986–1987) • Paysandu (1987–1988, 1991, 2000–2002, 2003–2004, 2004, 2012, 2013) • Santa Cruz (1989–1990, 1998–1999, 2004–2006, 2006–2007, 2010, 2017) • CSA (1990–1991, 1992) • Ponte Preta (1993, 2010) • Remo (1993, 2003, 2004, 2011, 2018) • Red Bull Bragantino (1993) • Bahia (1997) • América Mineiro (1997–1998, 2009, 2011–2012, 2014–2016, 2018–2019) • Fortaleza (2004) • Athletico Paranaense (2006) • Vitória (2007) • Brasiliense (2007) • Vila Nova (2008–2009) • Mogi Mirim (2009) • Treze (2014) • Ceará (2017)	1,561	744	407	410	47.66	?
27	(Italy) (England) Dario Gradi	• Sutton United (1976–1977) • Wimbledon (1978–1981) • Crystal Palace (1981) • Crewe Alexandra (1983–2007, 2008, 2009–2011)	1,557	574	375	608	36.87	
28	(Northern Ireland) Roy Coyle	• Linfield (1975–1990) • Ards (1990–1991, 1993–1997) • Derry City (1991–1993) • Glentoran (1997–2006, 2012, 2015, 2016) • Newry City (2006–2007)	1,550	928	281	349	59.87	?
29	(England) Fred Everiss	• West Bromwich Albion (secretary-manager) (1902–1948)	1,520	656	331	532	43.16	?
30	(Brazil) Osvaldo Brandão	• Palmeiras (1945–1946, 1947–1948, 1958–1960, 1971–1975, 1980) • Santos (1948–1951) • Portuguesa (1951–1954) • Corinthians (1954–1958, 1964–1966, 1968, 1977–1978, 1980–1981) • Brazil (1955–1956, 1957, 1965, 1975–1977) • Independiente (1961–1963, 1967) • São Paulo (1963, 1971) • Peñarol (1969–1970) • Cruzeiro (1984) • Vila Nova (1986)	1,513	826	385	302	54.59	?
31	(Brazil) Geninho	• Novo Hamburgo (1984) • Francana (1985) • Botafogo-SP (1986, 1991, 1993) • Santos (1987–1988, 1992, 2001) • Vitória Guimarães (1988–1989) • Sãocarlense (1990) • Grêmio Maringá (1991) • Al Shabab (1993) • Fortaleza (1993) • Ituano (1994) • União São João (1994, 1997, 1999) • Vitória (1994, 1995, 1998, 2011, 2019–2020, 2022) • Comercial-SP (1995, 2012) • Ponte Preta (1995) • Juventude (1996, 1999) • Guarani (1997) • Bahia (1997) • Matonense (1998) • Ituano (2000) • Paraná (2000) • Athletico Paranaense (2001–2002, 2008–2009, 2011) • Atlético Mineiro (2002, 2008) • Corinthians (2003, 2006) • Vasco da Gama (2004) • Al-Ahli (2004–2005) • Goiás (2005–2006, 2006–2007) • Sport Recife (2007, 2010–2011, 2013–2014) • Botafogo (2008) • Náutico (2009) • Atlético Goianiense (2010) • Portuguesa (2012) • São Caetano (2013) • Avaí (2014–2015, 2018–2019, 2020) • Ceará (2015) • ABC (2016–2017)	1,509	585	431	493	38.77	?
32	(Brazil) Rubens Minelli	• América-SP (1963–1965, 1966) • Botofogo-SP (1966) • Sport Recife (1967) • Francana (1968, 1977) • Guarani (1969) • Palmeiras (1969–1971, 1982–1983, 1987–1988) • Portuguesa (1971–1973) • Internacional (1974–1976) • São Paulo (1977–1979) • Al Hilal (1979–1980) • Saudi Arabia (1980–1981) • Atlético Mineiro (1984) • Grêmio (1985, 1988–1989) • Corinthians (1986) • Paraná (1990, 1993, 1996–1997) • Rio Branco-SP (1991) • Santos (1991–1992) • Ferroviária (1994) • XV de Piracicaba (1994) • Coritiba (1998)	1,482	716	412	354	48.31	?
33	(England) Alan Devonshire	• Maidenhead United (1996–2003, 2015–2025) • Hampton & Richmond Borough (2003–2011) • Braintree Town (2011–2015)	1,457	613	322	522	42.07	?
34	(England) Bobby Robson	• Fulham (1968) • Ipswich Town (1969–1982) • England (1982–1990) • PSV Eindhoven (1990–1992, 1998–1999) • Sporting CP (1992–1994) • Porto (1994–1996) • Barcelona (1996–1997) • Newcastle United (1999–2004)	1,455	722	353	378	49.62	?
35	(England) Brian Clough	• Hartlepool United (1965–1967) • Derby County (1967–1973) • Brighton & Hove Albion (1973–1974) • Leeds United (1974) • Nottingham Forest (1975–1993)	1,453	675	368	410	46.46	
36	(Brazil) (Mexico) Ricardo Ferretti	• UNAM (1991–1996, 2006–2010) • Mexico (interim) (1993, 2015, 2018) • Guadalajara (1996–2000) • UANL (2000–2003, 2006, 2010–2021) • Toluca (2003–2004) • Morelia (2005) • Juárez (2021–2022) • Cruz Azul (2023)	1,452	613	415	424	42.22	?
37	(Scotland) Alex Smith	• Stenhousemuir (1968–1974) • Stirling (1974–1986) • St Mirren (1986–1988) • Aberdeen (1988–1992) • Clyde (1992–1996) • Scotland U21 (1998–2002) • Dundee United (2000–2002) • Ross County (2002–2005) • Falkirk (2013, 2017)	1,447	530	402	515	36.63	
38	(Italy) Claudio Ranieri	• Vigor Lamezia (1986–1987) • Puteolana (1987–1988, 1988) • Cagliari (1988–1991, 2023–2024) • Napoli (1991–1992) • Fiorentina (1993–1997) • Valencia (1997–1999, 2004–2005) • Atlético Madrid (1999–2000) • Chelsea (2000–2004) • Parma (2007) • Juventus (2007–2009) • Roma (2009–2011, 2019, 2024–2025) • Inter Milan (2011–2012) • Monaco (2012–2014) • Greece (2014) • Leicester City (2015–2017) • Nantes (2017–2018) • Fulham (2018–2019) • Sampdoria (2019–2021) • Watford (2021–2022)	1,439	658	387	394	45.73	?
39	(Portugal) **Jorge Jesus**	• Amora (1990–1993) • Felgueiras (1993–1996, 1997–1998) • União Madeira (1998) • Estrela da Amadora (1998–2000, 2002–2003) • Vitória de Setúbal (2000–2002) • Vitória de Guimarães (2003–2004) • Moreirense (2005) • União Leiria (2005–2006) • Belenenses (2006–2008) • Braga (2008–2009) • Benfica (2008–2015, 2020–2021) • Sporting CP (2015–2018) • Al-Hilal (2018–2019, 2023–2025) • Flamengo (2019–2020) • Fenerbahçe (2022–2023) • Al-Nassr (2025–2026) • Portugal (2026–present)	1,438	840	297	301	58.41	?
40	(Italy) Giovanni Trapattoni	• Milan (1974, 1975–1976) • Juventus (1976–1986, 1991–1994) • Inter Milan (1986–1991) • Bayern Munich (1994–1995, 1996–1998) • Cagliari (1995–1996) • Fiorentina (1998–2000) • Italy (2000–2004) • Benfica (2004–2005) • VfB Stuttgart (2005–2006) • Red Bull Salzburg (2006–2008) • Republic of Ireland (2008–2013)	1,418	729	411	278	51.41	?
41	(Italy) **Carlo Ancelotti**	• Reggiana (1995–1996) • Parma (1996–1998) • Juventus (1999–2001) • Milan (2001–2009) • Chelsea (2009–2011) • Paris Saint-Germain (2011–2013) • Real Madrid (2013–2015, 2021–2025) • Bayern Munich (2016–2017) • Napoli (2018–2019) • Everton (2019–2021) • Brazil (2025–present)	1,418	848	308	262	59.80	
42	(England) Harry Redknapp	• Bournemouth (1983–1992) • West Ham United (1994–2001) • Portsmouth (2002–2004, 2005–2008) • Southampton (2004–2005) • Tottenham Hotspur (2008–2012) • Queens Park Rangers (2012–2015) • Jordan (2016) • Birmingham City (2017)	1,395	561	345	489	40.22	
43	(Brazil) Flávio Costa	• Flamengo (1934–1937, 1938–1945, 1946, 1951–1952, 1962–1965) • Portuguesa-RJ (1937) • Santos (1938) • Brazil (1944–1950, 1953, 1956) • Vasco da Gama (1947–1950, 1953–1956) • Porto (1956–1957, 1965–1966) • Portuguesa (1957–1958) • Colo-Colo (1959–1960) • São Paulo (1960–1961) • Bangu (1970)	1,384	787	273	324	56.86	?
44	(Socialist Federal Republic of Yugoslavia) (Bosnia and Herzegovina) (Croatia) Miroslav Blažević	• Vevey (1968–1971) • Sion (1971–1976) • Switzerland (1976) • Lausanne-Sport (1976–1979) • Rijeka (1979–1980) • Dinamo Zagreb (1980–1983, 1985–1988, 1992–1994, 2002–2003) • Grasshopper (1983–1985) • Prishtina (1985) • Nantes (1988–1991) • PAOK (1991–1992) • Croatia (1994–2000) • Iran (2001) • Osijek (2002) • Mura (2003) • Varteks (2003–2005) • Hajduk Split (2005) • Neuchâtel Xamax (2005–2006) • Zagreb (2006–2008, 2012–2013) • Bosnia and Herzegovina (2008–2009) • Shanghai Shenhua (2009–2010) • China U23 (2010–2011) • Mes Kerman (2011–2012) • Sloboda Tuzla (2014) • Zadar (2014–2015)	1,381	630	352	399	45.62	?
45	(Soviet Union) (Russia) Yuri Semin	• Kuban Krasnodar (1982) • Pamir Dushanbe (1983–1985) • Lokomotiv Moscow (1986–1990, 1992–2005, 2009–2010, 2016–2020) • Russia (2005) • Dynamo Moscow (2005–2006, 2009–2010) • Dinamo Kyiv (2007–2009, 2010–2012) • Gabala (2013–2014) • Mordovia Saransk (2014–2015) • Anzhi Makhachkala (2015) • Rostov (2021)	1,362	682	313	367	50.07	?
46	(England) John Coleman	• Ashton United (1997–1999) • Accrington Stanley (1999–2012, 2014–2024) • Rochdale (2012–2013) • Southport (2013–2014) • Sligo Rovers (2014) • Gillingham (2025) • Waterford (2025) • Aldershot Town (2025–2026)	1,350	536	336	474	39.8	
47	(Soviet Union) (Ukraine) Yevhen Lemeshko	• Podillia (1961–1965, 1968–1970, 1993) • Karpaty (1966–1967) • Desna (1967) • MFC Mykolaiv (1971–1974) • Krystal (1976) • Metalist Kharkiv (1977–1988, 1993) • Torpedo Zap (1989–1993)	1,347	586	354	407	43.50	?
48	(France) Christian Gourcuff	• Lorient (1982–1986, 1991–2001, 2003–2014) • Le Mans (1986–1989) • Pont-L'Abbé(1989–1991) • Rennes (2001–2002, 2016–2017) • Al-Gharafa (2002–2003, 2018–2019) • Algeria (2014–2016) • Nantes (2019–2020)	1,347	537	358	452	39.87	?
49	(Scotland) George Ramsay	• Aston Villa (1884–1926)	1,327	658	414	255	49.59	?
50	(Brazil) Telê Santana	• Fluminense (1969, 1989) • Atlético Mineiro (1970–1972, 1973–1975, 1987–1988) • São Paulo (1973, 1990–1996) • Botafogo (1976) • Grêmio (1976–1978) • Palmeiras (1979–1980, 1990) • Brazil (1980–1982, 1985–1986) • Al-Ahli Saudi (1983–1985) • Flamengo (1988–1989)	1,318	695	362	261	52.73	?
51	(England) Graham Taylor	• Lincoln City (1972–1977) • Watford (1977–1987, 1996, 1997–2001) • Aston Villa (1987–1990, 2002–2003) • England (1990–1993) • Wolverhampton Wanderers (1994–1995)	1,311	571	342	398	43.55	?
52	(Brazil) Jair Picerni	• Ponte Preta (1980–1981, 1986, 1995) • Inter de Limeira (1982) • Santo André (1982–1984, 1987, 1991, 1994, 2010) • Corinthians (1984–1985) • Portuguesa (1984–1985, 1988–1989) • Sport Recife (1988) • Botafogo-SP (1988, 1995) • Coritiba (1989) • Nacional (1989–1991, 1996–1997) • Paysandu (1992) • União São João (1992–1994, 1994, 1998, 2012) • Araçatuba (1996) • Bragantino (1996) • União Barbarense (1999, 2000) • Gama (1999) • São Caetano (2000–2002, 2005, 2007) • Guarani (2002, 2004–2005, 2008) • Palmeiras (2006–2004, 2006) • Atlético Mineiro (2004) • Bahia (2005) • Fortaleza (2006) • Brasiliense (2006) • Sertãozinho (2007) • Red Bull Brasil (2009)	1,306	548	389	369	41.96	?
53	(Chile) Hernán Godoy	• Audax Italiano (1974–1977, 1980–1981, 1985, 1989, 2001–2002) • Deportes Naval (1977) • Trasandino (1978, 1984) • Ñublense (1979) • San Luis (1982) • Deportes Concepción (1982) • Fernández Vial (1983) • Regional Atacama (1983) • Deportes Puerto Montt (1984) • Deportes Arica (1986, 1990, 1993–1994, 2000, 2009–2010, 2018) • Deportes Antofagasta (1986–1987) • Santiago Wanderers (1988, 1991, 2006–2007) • Deportes Linares (1989) • Inca de New York (1990, 1991) • Comunicaciones (1992) • Deportes Melipilla (1995, 2011) • Unión Santa Cruz (1996–1997) • Florida Soccer Miami (1998) • San Antonio Unido (1998) • Unión San Felipe (1999, 2004–2005) • Deportes Iquique (2002) • Santiago Morning (2002–2003, 2011, 2013–2014, 2016–2017) • Mitra Kukar (2004) • Unión Quilpué (2008)	1,303	428	372	503	42.37	?
54	(Soviet Union) (Ukraine) Valeriy Lobanovskyi	• Dnipro Dnipropetrovsk (1969–1973) • Dynamo Kyiv (1973–1982, 1984–1990, 1997–2002) • Soviet Union (1975–1976, 1982–1983, 1986–1990) • United Arab Emirates (1990–1993) • Kuwait (1994–1996)	1,300	735	337	228	56.54	
55	(England) Neil Cugley	• Folkestone Invicta (1997–2022)	1,299	?	?	?	?	
56	(Italy) Carlo Mazzone	• Ascoli (1968–1975, 1980–1984) • Fiorentina (1975–1977) • Catanzaro (1978–1980) • Bologna (1985–1986, 1998–1999, 2003–2005) • Lecce (1987–1990) • Pescara (1990–1991) • Cagliari (1991–1993, 1996–1997) • Roma (1993–1996) • Napoli (1997–1998) • Perugia (1999–2000) • Brescia (2000–2003) • Livorno (2006)	1,298	459	436	403	35.36	?
56	(Colombia) Jorge Luis Pinto	• Millonarios (1984–1985, 1998–1999, 2018–2019) • Santa Fe (1986–1987, 1991–1993) • Unión Magdalena (1988–1989, 1994–1997, 2024–2025) • Deportivo Cali (1990–1991, 2022–2023) • Alianza Lima (1997–1998, 1999–2000) • Atlético Bucaramanga (2001) • Alajuelense (2002–2003) • Junior (2003–2004, 2011) • Costa Rica (2004–2005, 2011–2014) • Cúcuta Deportivo (2006, 2009) • Colombia (2007–2008) • El Nacional (2010) • Deportivo Táchira (2010–2011) • Honduras Olympic (2016) • Honduras (2014–2017) • United Arab Emirates (2020)	1,298	533	374	397	50.4	?
58	(Northern Ireland) **David Jeffrey**	• Larne (1995–1996) • Linfield (1997–2014) • Ballymena United (2016–2023) • Portadown F.C. (2026–present)	1,290	742	245	304	57.52	?
59	(Scotland) Steve Evans	• Boston United (1998–2002, 2004–2007) • Crawley Town (2007–2012) • Rotherham United (2012–2015, 2024–2025) • Leeds United (2015–2016) • Mansfield Town (2016–2018) • Peterborough United (2018–2019) • Gillingham (2019–2022) • Stevenage (2022–2024)	1,284	545	345	381	42.2	
59	(Argentina) Miguel Ángel Russo	• Lanús (1989–1994, 1999–2000) • Estudiantes LP (1994–1995, 2011) • Universidad de Chile (1996) • Rosario Central (1997–1998, 2002–2004, 2009, 2012–2014, 2022–2024) • Salamanca (1998–1999) • Colón (1999) • Los Andes (2000–2001) • Morelia (2001–2002) • Vélez Sarsfield (2005–2006, 2015) • Boca Juniors (2006–2007, 2020–2021, 2025) • San Lorenzo (2008–2009, 2024–2025) • Racing Club (2010–2011) • Millonarios (2017–2018) • Alianza Lima (2019) • Cerro Porteño (2019) • Al-Nassr (2021–2022)	1,284	511	376	397	49.56	
61	(Brazil) Antônio Lopes	• Olaria (1980) • America-RJ (1981) • Vasco da Gama (1981–1983, 1985–1986, 1991, 1997–2000, 2002–2003, 2008) • Kuwait (1983–1985) • Fluminense (1986–1987, 2006) • Flamengo (1987) • Ivory Coast (1988) • Sport Recife (1988) • Al Wasl (1988–1989) • Portuguesa (1989–1990, 1993) • Os Belenenses (1990–1991) • Internacional (1992, 1994) • Santos (1993) • Al Hilal (1994) • Cruzeiro (1995) • Cerro Porteño (1995–1996) • Paraná (1996) • Grêmio (2000) • Athletico Paranaense (2000, 2005, 2007, 2008–2009, 2011–2012) • Coritiba (2003–2005) • Corinthians (2005–2006) • Goiás (2006) • Avaí (2010) • Vitória (2010–2011) • América Mineiro (2011)	1,282	585	368	329	45.63	?
62	(England) Roy Hodgson	• Halmstads BK (1976–1980) • Bristol City (1982, 2026) • Örebro (1983–1984) • Malmö FF (1985–1989) • Neuchâtel Xamax (1990–1991) • Switzerland (1992–1995) • Inter Milan (1995–1997, 1999) • Blackburn Rovers (1997–1998) • Grasshoppers (1999–2000) • Copenhagen (2000–2001) • Udinese (2001) • United Arab Emirates (2002–2004) • Viking (2004–2005) • Finland (2006–2007) • Fulham (2007–2010) • Liverpool (2010–2011) • West Bromwich Albion (2011–2012) • England (2012–2016) • England U21 (2013) • Crystal Palace (2017–2021, 2023–2024) • Watford (2022)	1,275	543	347	382	42.64	
63	(Germany) Jupp Heynckes	• Borussia Mönchengladbach (1979–1987, 2006–2007) • Bayern Munich (1987–1991, 2009, 2011–2013, 2017–2018) • Athletic Bilbao (1992–1994, 2001–2003) • Eintracht Frankfurt (1994–1995) • Tenerife (1995–1997) • Real Madrid (1997–1998) • Benfica (1999–2000) • Schalke 04 (2003–2004) • Bayer Leverkusen (2009–2011)	1,265	657	286	322	51.94	?
64	(Italy) Luigi Fresco	• Virtus Verona (1982–2026)	1,261	447	429	385	35.45	?
65	(Argentina) Carlos Timoteo Griguol	• Rosario Central (1971, 1973–1975, 1977–1978) • Tecos de Guadalajara (1975) • Kimberley (1979) • Ferro Carril Oeste (1979–1987, 1988–1993) • River Plate (1987–1988) • Gimnasia y Esgrima La Plata (1994–1999, 2000–2001, 2003–2004) • Real Betis (1999–2000) • Unión de Santa Fe (2002)	1,260	?	?	?	?	?
66	(Brazil) Joel Santana	• Al Wasl (1981–1986) • Vasco da Gama (1986–1987, 1992–1993, 2000–2001, 2004–2005, 2014) • Al-Nassr (1988–1990) • America-RJ (1991) • Al Hilal (1991) • Bahia (1994, 1999–2000, 2011–2012, 2013) • Fluminense (1995, 2003) • Flamengo (1996, 1998, 2005, 2007–2008, 2012) • Corinthians (1997) • Botafogo (2000, 2010–2011) • Coritiba (2001–2002) • Vitória (2002–2003) • Guarani (2004) • Internacional (2004) • Brasiliense (2005) • Vegalta Sendai (2006) • South Africa (2008–2009) • Cruzeiro (2011) • Boavista (2017)	1,258	623	312	323	49.52	?
67	(Spain) Rafael Benítez	• Real Madrid B (1993–1994, 1994–1995) • Valladolid (1995–1996) • Osasuna (1996) • Extremadura (1997–1999) • Tenerife (2000–2001) • Valencia (2001–2004) • Liverpool (2004–2010) • Inter Milan (2010) • Chelsea (2012–2013) • Napoli (2013–2015) • Real Madrid (2015–2016) • Newcastle United (2016–2019) • Dalian Professional (2019–2021) • Everton (2021–2022) • Celta Vigo (2023–2024) • Panathinaikos (2025–2026)	1,245	600	289	334	48.3	?
68	(Portugal) **José Mourinho**	• Benfica (2000, 2025–2026) • União de Leiria (2001–2002) • Porto (2002–2004) • Chelsea (2004–2007, 2013–2015) • Inter Milan (2008–2010) • Real Madrid (2010–2013, 2026–present) • Manchester United (2016–2018) • Tottenham Hotspur (2019–2021) • Roma (2021–2024) • Fenerbahçe (2024–2025)	1,244	768	250	216	61.74	
69	(Brazil) Mário Zagallo	• Botafogo (1966–1970, 1975, 1978, 1986–1987) • Fluminense (1971–1972) • Flamengo (1972–1974, 1984–1985, 2001) • Kuwait (1976–1978) • Al-Hilal (1979) • Vasco da Gama (1980–1981, 1990–1991) • Saudi Arabia (1981–1984) • Bangu (1988–1989) • United Arab Emirates (1989–1990) • Associação Portuguesa (1999–2000) • Brazil (1967, 1970–1974, 1994–1998, 2002)	1,239	558	355	326	45.04	?
70	(Austria) (Croatia) Otto Barić	• Lokomotiva Zagreb (1964–1967) • Opel Rüsselsheim (1967–1969) • Germania Wiesbaden (1969–1970) • Wacker Innsbruck (1970–1972) • LASK Linz (1972–1974, 1998–1999) • Zagreb (1974–1976) • Dinamo Vinkovci (1976–1979) • Dinamo Zagreb (1979–1980, 1996–1997) • Sturm Graz (1980–1982) • Rapid Wien (1982–1985, 1986–1988) • Stuttgart (1985–1986) • Vorwärts Steyr (1990–1991) • Casino Salzburg (1991–1995) • Fenerbahçe (1997–1998) • Austria (1999–2001) • Croatia (2002–2004) • Albania (2006–2007)	1,233	618	301	314	49.23	?
71	(Wales) John Toshack	• Swansea City Player/Manager (1978–1984) • Sporting CP (1984–1985) • Real Sociedad (1985–1989, 1991–1994, 2001–2002) • Real Madrid (1989–1990, 1999) • Wales (1994, 2004–2010) • Deportivo La Coruña (1995–1997) • Beşiktaş (1997–1999) • Saint-Étienne (2000–2001) • Catania (2002–2003) • Murcia (2004) • Macedonia (2011–2012) • Khazar Lankaran (2013) • Wydad Casablanca (2014–2016) • Tractor (2018)	1,226	528	305	393	43.07	?
72	(Germany) Otto Rehhagel	• 1. FC Saarbrücken (1972–1973) • Kickers Offenbach (1974–1975) • Werder Bremen (1976, 1981–1995) • Borussia Dortmund (1976–1978) • Arminia Bielefeld (1978–1979) • Fortuna Düsseldorf (1979–1980) • Bayern Munich (1995–1996) • 1. FC Kaiserslautern (1996–2000) • Greece (2001–2010) • Hertha BSC (2012)	1,225	606	278	341	49.47	?
73	(Argentina) Victorio Spinetto	• Vélez Sarsfield (1942–1956) • Atlanta (1956–1959) • Argentina (1959, 1960–1961) • Argentinos Juniors (1962–1963, 1972–1973, 1978) • Racing Club (1970, 1971) • Ferro Carril Oeste (1973–1976)	1,220	?	?	?	?	?
74	(Brazil) Lori Sandri	• Pinheiros (1976) • Uberaba (1977–1978) • Chapecoense (1978, 1980–1981) • Athletico Paranaense (1979, 1983) • Criciúma (1981–1982, 1987, 1991, 1994, 2003, 2004) • Botafogo-SP (1982–1983, 2001, 2012) • Marília (1983, 2007) • Santa Cruz (1984, 2010) • América-SP (1984) • Guarani (1985–1986, 2004) • Inter de Limeira (1986) • Juventus-SP (1987) • Bandeirante (1987) • Grêmio Maringá (1988) • Al Shabab (1988–1989, 1992–1993) • Al-Ettifaq (1990, 1994) • Sport Recife (1995) • Coritiba (1995–1996, 2000) • XV de Jaú (1996) • Al Ain (1996) • Juventude (1998) • Al Hilal (1999) • Goiás (2001) • Tokyo Verdy (2002–2003) • Vitória (2003) • Internacional (2004) • Paraná (2005, 2007) • Atlético Mineiro (2005–2006) • América-RN (2007) • Sertãozinho (2008) • Marítimo (2008–2009) • Noroeste (2011)	1,219	450	386	383	36.92	?
75	(Scotland) **David Moyes**	• Preston North End (1998–2002) • Everton (2002–2013, 2025–present) • Manchester United (2013–2014) • Real Sociedad (2014–2015) • Sunderland (2016–2017) • West Ham United (2017–2018, 2019–2024)	1,215	514	303	398	42.3	
75	(Spain) **José Bordalás**	• Alicante B (1993–1994) • Alicante (1994–1995, 1998–2002, 2004–2006) • Benidorm (1995–1996) • Eldense (1996–1997) • Mutxavista (1997–1998) • Novelda (2002–2003) • Hércules (2006) • Alcoyano (2007–2009) • Elche (2009–2012) • Alcorcón (2012–2013, 2014–2015) • Alavés (2015–2016) • Getafe (2016–2021, 2023–present) • Valencia (2021–2022)	1,215	552	318	345	45.43	?
77	(Brazil) **Tite**	• Guarany de Garibaldi (1990–1991) • Caxias (1991–1992, 1998, 1999–2000) • Veranópolis (1992–1995, 1998) • Ypiranga-RS (1996) • Juventude (1996–1997) • Grêmio (2000–2003) • São Caetano (2003–2004) • Corinthians (2004–2005, 2010–2013, 2014–2016) • Atlético Mineiro (2005) • Palmeiras (2006) • Al Ain (2007) • Internacional (2008–2009) • Al Wahda (2010) • Brazil (2016–2022) • Flamengo(2023–2024) • Cruzeiro (2026)	1,209	593	334	282	49.05	?
78	(Sweden) Sven-Göran Eriksson	• Degerfors IF (1977–1978) • IFK Göteborg (1979–1982) • Benfica (1982–1984, 1989–1992) • Roma (1984–1987) • Fiorentina (1987–1989) • Sampdoria (1992–1997) • Lazio (1997–2001) • England (2001–2006) • Manchester City (2007–2008) • Mexico (2008–2009) • Ivory Coast (2010) • Leicester City (2010–2011) • Guangzhou R&F (2013–2014) • Shanghai SIPG (2014–2016) • Shenzhen FC (2016–2017) • Philippines (2018–2019)	1,207	629	308	270	52.11	?
79	(Turkmenistan) **Kurban Berdyev**	• Taraz (1986–1989, 1991–1993) • Gençlerbirliği (1993–1994) • Kairat (1994–1995, 2021–2022) • Caspiy (1996–1997) • Nisa Aşgabat (1997–1999) • Turkmenistan (1999) • Kristall Smolensk (2000–2001) • Rubin Kazan (2001–2013, 2017–2019) • Rostov (2014–2017) • Tractor (2022) • Sochi (2022–2023) • Dynamo Makhachkala (2023–2024) • Turan Tovuz (2024–present)	1,202	574	272	356	47.75	?
80	(England) Denis Smith	• York City (1982–1987) • Sunderland (1987–1991) • Bristol City (1992–1993) • Oxford United (1993–1997, 2000) • West Bromwich Albion (1997–1999) • Wrexham (2001–2007)	1,195	464	290	441	38.83	?
81	(Northern Ireland) **Martin O'Neill**	• Wycombe Wanderers (1990–1995) • Norwich City (1995) • Leicester City (1995–2000) • Celtic (2000–2005, 2025, 2026–present) • Aston Villa (2006–2010) • Sunderland (2011–2013) • Republic of Ireland (2013–2018) • Nottingham Forest (2019)	1,194	632	278	284	52.9	
82	(Scotland) Bill Shankly	• Carlisle United (1949–1951) • Grimsby Town (1951–1953) • Workington (1954–1955) • Huddersfield Town (1956–1959) • Liverpool (1959–1974)	1,190	586	305	299	49.24	?
83	(Brazil) **Mano Menezes**	• Guarani-VA (1997–2002, 2003) • Brasil de Pelotas (2002) • Iraty (2003) • 15 de Novembro (2003–2004) • Caxias (2004–2005) • Grêmio (2005–2007, 2025) • Corinthians (2008–2010, 2014, 2023–2024) • Brazil (2010–2012) • Flamengo (2013) • Cruzeiro (2015, 2016–2019) • Shandong Luneng (2016) • Palmeiras (2019) • Bahia (2020) • Al Nassr (2021) • Internacional (2022–2023) • Fluminense (2024–2025) • Peru (2026–present)	1,185	572	309	304	49.2	?
84	(England) Lennie Lawrence	• Plymouth Argyle (1978) • Charlton Athletic (1982–1991) • Middlesbrough (1991–1994) • Bradford City (1994–1995) • Luton Town (1995–2000) • Grimsby Town (2000–2001) • Cardiff City (2002–2005) • Crystal Palace (joint caretaker) (2012) • Hartlepool United (2024, 2024–2025)	1,167	410	437	320	35.13	?
84	(Netherlands) **Dick Advocaat**	• Haarlem (1987–1989) • S.V.V. (1989–1991) • Dordrecht (1991–1992) • Netherlands (1992–1994, 2002–2004, 2017) • PSV Eindhoven (1994–1998, 2012–2013) • Rangers (1998–2001) • Borussia Mönchengladbach (2004–2005) • United Arab Emirates (2005) • South Korea (2005–2006) • Zenit Saint Petersburg (2006–2009) • Belgium (2009–2010) • AZ (2009–2010, 2013–2014) • Russia (2010–2012) • Serbia (2014) • Sunderland (2015) • Fenerbahçe (2016–2017) • Sparta Rotterdam (2017–2018) • Utrecht (2018–2019) • Feyenoord (2019–2021) • Iraq (2021) • ADO Den Haag (2022–2023) • Curaçao (2024–present)	1,167	612	272	283	52.6	?
84	(Brazil) **Péricles Chamusca**	• Vitória (1994–1995, 2001) • Santa Cruz (1996, 2002–2004) • Mirassol (1997) • Rio Branco (1997) • América de Natal (1997) • Porto de Caruaru (1998) • Alagoano (1998) • Corinthians Alagoano (2001) • Confiança (2002) • Brasiliense (2002) • Caxias do Sul (2002) • Santo André (2004) • São Caetano (2004) • Goiás (2005) • Botafogo (2005) • Oita Trinita (2005–2009) • Sport Club do Recife (2009) • Avaí (2009–2010) • Al-Arabi (2010–2011) • El Jaish (2011–2012) • Portuguesa (2012–2013) • Coritiba (2013) • Júbilo Iwata (2014) • Al-Gharafa (2015) • Al-Shaab (2016–2017) • Al Faisaly (2018–2021) • Al Hilal (2019) • Al Shabab (2021–2022) • Al Taawoun (2022–2024, 2025–2026) • Neom (2024–2025) • Al Wahda (2026–present)	1,167	532	285	350	45.6	?
87	(Brazil) **Cuca**	• Uberlândia (1998) • Inter de Limeira (2000) • Inter de Lages (2001) • Remo (2001) • Criciúma (2001–2002) • Gama (2002) • Paraná (2003) • Goiás (2003) • São Paulo (2003–2004, 2019) • Grêmio (2004) • Flamengo (2005, 2008–2009) • Coritiba (2005) • São Caetano (2005) • Botafogo (2006–2007, 2007–2008) • Santos (2008, 2018, 2020–2021, 2026–present) • Fluminense (2008, 2009–2010) • Cruzeiro (2010–2011) • Atlético Mineiro (2011–2013, 2021, 2022, 2025) • Shandong Luneng (2013–2015) • Palmeiras (2016, 2017) • Corinthians (2023) • Athletico Paranaense (2024)	1,162	567	304	291	48.80	?
88	(Socialist Federal Republic of Yugoslavia) (Bosnia and Herzegovina) Dušan Bajević	• Velež Mostar (1983–1987) • AEK Athens (1988–1996, 2002–2004, 2008–2010) • Olympiacos (1996–1999, 2004–2005) • PAOK (2000–2002) • Red Star Belgrade (2006–2007) • Aris (2007–2008) • Omonia (2010–2011) • Atromitos (2012) • Bosnia and Herzegovina (2019–2020)	1,161	660	265	236	56.85	?
89	(Mexico) Ignacio Trelles	• Zacatepec (1950–1951, 1954–1958) • Marte (1953–1954) • América (1958–1960) • Mexico (1960–1969, 1975–1975) • Toluca (1966–1972) • Puebla (1972–1975, 1990–1991) • Cruz Azul (1976–1982) • Atlante (1983–1985) • UDG (1986–1989)	1,159	520	341	298	44.87	?
89	(Spain) **Miguel Álvarez**	• Cerdanyola Mataró (1991–1992) • Guíxols (1992–1993) • Horta (1993–1994) • Vilassar Mar (1994–1997) • Mataró (1997–2000) • Terrassa (2000–2003, 2006–2007) • Ciudad Murcia (2004, 2005) • Lorca (2007–2008) • Badalona (2008–2009) • Hospitalet (2010–2011, 2012–2013) • Leganés (2011) • Alcorcón (2013–2014) • Sant Andreu (2015) • Sabadell (2015–2016) • Marbella (2017) • Villarreal B (2017–2025) • Ibiza (2025–present)	1,159	474	292	326	42.08	?
91	(Spain) Gregorio Manzano	• Santisteban (1983–1985) • Villacarrillo (1985–1986) • Iliturgi (1986–1988) • Villanueva (1988–1989) • Úbeda (1989–1990) • Jaén (1990–1991) • Martos (1991–1993) • Talavera (1996–1998) • Toledo (1998–1999) • Valladolid (1999–2000) • Racing Santander (2000–2001) • Rayo Vallecano (2001–2002) • Mallorca (2002–2003, 2006–2010, 2013) • Atlético Madrid (2003–2004, 2011) • Málaga (2004–2005) • Sevilla (2010–2011) • Beijing Guoan (2014–2015) • Shanghai Shenhua (2015–2016) • Guizhou Hengfeng Zhicheng (2017–2018)	1,154	486	288	380	42.11	?
92	(Mexico) **Víctor Manuel Vucetich**	• Neza (1988–1989) • León (1990–1993, 1999) • Tecos (1993–1995, 1997–1998) • UANL (1995–1996, 1999–2000, 2026–present) • Cruz Azul (1996–1997) • La Piedad (2001–2002) • Puebla (2002–2003) • Pachuca (2003–2004) • Veracruz (2005, 2006) • Chiapas (2007) • Monterrey (2009–2013, 2022–2023) • Mexico (2013) • Querétaro (2015–2017, 2019–2020) • Guadalajara (2020–2021) • Mazatlán (2024–2025)	1,153	481	338	334	41.72	?
93	(Spain) Luis Aragonés	• Atlético Madrid (1974–1980, 1982–1987, 1991–1993, 2001–2003) • Real Betis (1981, 1997–1998) • Barcelona (1987–1988) • Espanyol (1990–1991) • Sevilla (1993–1995) • Valencia (1995–1997) • Oviedo (1999–2000) • Mallorca (2000–2001, 2003–2004) • Spain (2004–2008) • Fenerbahçe (2008–2009)	1,151	567	262	322	49.26	?
93	(Scotland) Matt Busby	• Manchester United (1945–1969, 1970–1971) • Scotland (1958)	1,151	579	268	304	50.3	
95	(Argentina) Helenio Herrera	• Stade Français (1945–1948) • Real Valladolid (1948–1949) • Atlético Madrid (1949–1952) • Deportivo de La Coruña (1953) • Sevilla (1953–1957) • Belenenses (1957–1958) • Barcelona (1958–1960, 1980–1981) • Spain (1959–1960, 1962) • Inter Milan (1960–1968, 1973–1974) • Italy (1966–1967) • Roma (1968–1971, 1971–1973) • Rimini (1979)	1,148	602	250	296	52.44	?
96	(Soviet Union) (Russia) Konstantin Beskov	• FC Torpedo Moscow (1956) • FShM Moscow (1957–1960) • CSKA Moscow (1961–1961) • Soviet Union (1963–1964, 1974, 1979–1982) • Zorya (1964–1965) • Lokomotiv Moscow (1966) • Dynamo Moscow (1967–1972, 1994–1995) • Spartak Moscow (1977–1978) • Asmaral (1991–1992)	1,146	543	306	297	47.38	?
97	(Scotland) Jimmy McGuigan	• Crewe Alexandra (1960–1964) • Grimsby Town (1964–1967) • Chesterfield (1967–1973) • Rotherham United (1973–1979) • Stockport County (1979–1982)	1,137	430	286	421	37.82	?
97	(Wales) Tony Pulis	• Bournemouth (1992–1994) • Gillingham (1995–1999) • Bristol City (1999–2000) • Portsmouth (2000) • Stoke City (2002–2005, 2006–2013) • Plymouth Argyle (2005–2006) • Crystal Palace (2013–2014) • West Bromwich Albion (2015–2017) • Middlesbrough (2017–2019) • Sheffield Wednesday (2020)	1,137	410	338	389	36.06	
99	(Czech Republic) Zdeněk Zeman	• Licata (1983–1986) • Foggia (1986–1987, 1989–1994, 2010–2011, 2021–2022) • Parma (1987) • Messina (1988–1989) • Lazio (1994–1997) • Roma (1997–1999, 2012–2013) • Fenerbahçe (1999–2000) • Napoli (2000) • Salernitana (2001–2002) • Avellino (2003–2004) • Lecce (2004–2005, 2006–2007) • Brescia (2006) • Red Star Belgrade (2008) • Pescara (2011–2012, 2017–2018, 2023–2024) • Cagliari (2014, 2015) • Lugano (2015–2016)	1,132	431	305	396	38.07	?
100	(Italy) **Maurizio Sarri**	• Cavriglia (1993–1996) • Antella (1996–1998) • Valdema (1998–1999) • Tegoleto (1999–2000) • Sansovino (2000–2003) • Sangiovannese (2003–2005) • Pescara (2005–2006) • Arezzo (2006–2007) • Avellino (2007) • Hellas Verona (2007–2008) • Perugia (2008–2009) • Grosseto (2010) • Alessandria (2010–2011) • Sorrento (2011) • Empoli (2012–2015) • Napoli (2015–2018) • Chelsea (2018–2019) • Juventus (2019–2020) • Lazio (2021–2024, 2025–2026) • Atalanta (2026–present)	1,131	524	318	289	46.33	?
101	(Spain) Miguel Ángel Lotina	• Logroñés B (1990–1993) • Logroñés (1992, 1996) • Numancia (1993–1996, 1998–1999) • Badajoz (1997) • Osasuna (1999–2002) • Celta Vigo (2002–2004) • Espanyol (2004–2006) • Real Sociedad (2006–2007) • Deportivo La Coruña (2007–2011) • Villarreal (2012) • Omonia (2013–2014) • Al-Shahania (2014, 2015–2016) • Tokyo Verdy (2016–2018) • Cerezo Osaka (2019–2021) • Shimizu S-Pulse (2021) • Vissel Kobe (2022)	1,130	443	319	368	39.20	?
102	(England) Alan Buckley	• Walsall (1978, 1979–1981, 1981–1982 [joint], 1982–1986) • Kettering Town (1986–1988) • Grimsby Town (1988–1994, 1997–2000, 2006–2008) • West Bromwich Albion (1994–1997) • Lincoln City (2001–2002) • Rochdale (2003)	1,126	425	396	305	37.74	?
102	(Spain) **Unai Emery**	• Lorca Deportiva (2004–2006) • Almería (2006–2008) • Valencia (2008–2012) • Spartak Moscow (2012) • Sevilla (2013–2016) • Paris Saint-Germain (2016–2018) • Arsenal (2018–2019) • Villarreal (2020–2022) • Aston Villa (2022–present)	1,126	602	241	283	53.5	
104	(England) Jack Addenbrooke	• Wolverhampton Wanderers (1885–1922)	1,125	?	?	?	?	?
105	(Scotland) **Dick Campbell**	• Cowdenbeath (1987) • Dunfermline Athletic (1999) • Brechin City (2000–2005) • Partick Thistle (2005–2007) • Ross County (2007) • Forfar Athletic (2008–2015) • Arbroath (2016–2023) • East Fife (2024–present)	1,119	457	266	396	40.84	?
106	(Ukraine) Myron Markevych	• Torpedo Lutsk (1984–1987, 1991–1992) • Podillya Khmelnytskyi (1988–1989, 1995) • Kryvbas Kryvyi Rih (1990, 1996) • Karpaty Lviv (1992–1995, 1996–1998, 2001–2002, 2003–2004, 2023–2024) • Metalurh Zaporizhzhia (1999–2001) • Anzhi Makhachkala (2002) • Metalist Kharkiv (2005–2014) • Ukraine (2010) • Dnipro Dnipropetrovsk (2014–2016)	1,117	541	263	313	48.4	?
106	(England) **Chris Wilder**	• Alfreton Town (2001–2002) • Halifax Town (2002–2008) • Oxford United (2008–2014) • Northampton Town (2014–2016) • Sheffield United (2016–2021, 2023–present) • Middlesbrough (2021–2022) • Watford (2023)	1,117	484	258	375	43.3	
108	(Scotland) Jim Jefferies	• Hawick Royal Albert (1983) • Gala Fairydean (1983–1988) • Berwick Rangers (1988–1990) • Falkirk (1990–1995) • Heart of Midlothian (1995–2000, 2010–2011) • Bradford City (2000–2001) • Kilmarnock (2002–2010) • Dunfermline Athletic (2012–2014)	1,116	?	?	?	?	?
109	(Scotland) Jim McLean	• Dundee United (1971–1993)	1,112	535	270	307	?	?
110	(Italy) Fabrizio Castori	• Belfortese (1980–1981, 1983–1984) • San Vicino (1981–1982) • Urbisaglia (1982–1983) • Camerino (1985–1987) • Grottese (1987–1988) • Cerreto (1988–1991) • Monturanese (1991–1992) • Tolentino (1992–1998) • Lanciano (1998–1999, 2000–2003) • Castel di Sangro (1999) • Cesena (2003–2007, 2008, 2017–2018) • Salernitana (2008, 2009, 2020–2021) • Piacenza (2009) • Ascoli (2010–2011, 2023–2024) • Varese (2012–2013) • Reggina (2013) • Carpi (2014–2015, 2015–2017, 2018–2019) • Trapani (2019–2020) • Perugia (2022, 2022–2023)	1,107	401	375	331	36.22	?
111	(Colombia) **Alberto Gamero**	• Chía (2003) • Bogotá (2004) • Boyacá Chicó (2006–2013) • Itagüí (2014) • Deportes Tolima (2014–2016, 2017–2019) • Junior (2017) • Millonarios (2020–2024, 2026–present) • Deportivo Cali (2025–2026)	1,106	444	321	341	49.81	?
111	(Chile) **Gustavo Huerta**	• Cobresal (1991–1992, 2003, 2004–2005, 2017–present) • Deportes Ovalle (1993–1995) • Deportes La Serena (1996–1999) • Deportes Melipilla (2002) • Bolívar (2003) • Universidad de Chile (2006) • Cobreloa (2007) • Santiago Wanderers (2008) • Coquimbo Unido (2009) • Deportes Iquique (2009–2010) • Deportes Antofagasta (2011–2014) • Deportes Santa Cruz (2015–2016)	1,106	441	274	391	48.13	
113	(Brazil) Zezé Moreira	• Botafogo FR (1948–1949, 1954–1956) • Fluminense (1951–1954, 1957–1962, 1973) • Brazil (1952, 1954–1955) • Nacional (1963, 1968–1969) • Palestino (1964) • Vasco da Gama (1965–1966) • Corinthians (1966–1967) • Sport Recife (1967) • São Paulo (1970) • Os Belenenses (1971–1972) • Bahia (1975, 1978–1981) • Cruzeiro (1975–1977)	1,104	609	243	252	55.16	?
113	(England) Joe Royle	• Oldham Athletic (1982–1994, 2009) • Everton (1994–1997) • Manchester City (1998–2001) • Ipswich Town (2002–2006) • Everton (2016)	1,104	431	301	372	39.04	
115	(Spain) **José Luis Mendilibar**	• Arratia (1994–1996) • Basconia (1997–1999, 2000–2001) • Athletic Bilbao B (1999–2000) • Aurrerá (2001–2002) • Lanzarote (2002–2004) • Eibar (2004–2005, 2015–2021) • Athletic Bilbao (2005) • Valladolid (2006–2010) • Osasuna (2011–2013) • Levante (2014) • Alavés (2021–2022) • Sevilla (2023) • Olympiacos (2024–present)	1,103	447	298	358	40.53	?
116	(Brazil) Muricy Ramalho	• Club Puebla (1993) • São Paulo (1995–1997, 2006–2009, 2013–2015) • Guarani (1997) • Shanghai Shenhua (1998) • Náutico (2001–2002) • Internacional (2002–2003, 2004–2005) • São Caetano (2004) • Palmeiras (2009–2010) • Fluminense (2010–2011) • Santos (2011–2013) • Flamengo (2015–2016)	1,102	551	286	265	50.00	?
117	(England) Brian Horton	• Hull City (1984–1988) • Oxford United (1988–1993) • Manchester City (1993–1995) • Huddersfield Town (1995–1997) • Brighton & Hove Albion (1998–1999) • Port Vale (1999–2004) • Macclesfield Town (2004–2006, 2012)	1,098	367	305	426	33.42	?
118	(England) **Steve Bruce**	• Sheffield United (1998–1999) • Huddersfield (1999–2000) • Wigan (2001, 2007–2009) • Crystal Palace (2001) • Birmingham City (2001–2007) • Sunderland (2009–2011) • Hull City (2012–2016) • Aston Villa (2016–2018) • Sheffield Wednesday (2019) • Newcastle United (2019–2021) • West Bromwich Albion (2022) • Blackpool (2024–present)	1,094	405	286	403	37.0	
119	(Greece) Antonis Georgiadis	• Elpis Drama (1961–1963) • Iraklis Serres/Panserraikos (1963–1966) • Kavala (1966–1968) • Doxa Drama (1968–1970) • Olympiacos Volos (1970–1974, 1997–1998) • PAS Giannina (1974–1976, 1977–1979) • Panachaiki (1977) • OFI (1979–1980) • AEL (1980–1982) • Aris (1982–1984) • AEK Athens (1984–1985) • Olympiacos (1985–1986, 1993) • Apollon Kalamarias (1986–1988) • Ethnikos Piraeus (1988–1989) • Greece (1989–1992) • Paniliakos (1990, 1993–1996)	1,089	486	261	342	44.63	?
119	(France) Michel Le Milinaire	• CA Mayennais (1960–1964) • Laval II (1964–1968) • Laval (1968–1992) • Rennes (1993–1996)	1,089+	418	316	355	38.38	?
121	(England) **Phil Parkinson**	• Colchester United (2003–2006) • Hull City (2006) • Charlton Athletic (2008–2011) • Bradford City (2011–2016) • Bolton Wanderers (2016–2019) • Sunderland (2019–2020) • Wrexham (2021–present)	1,084	456	299	329	42.1	
121	(Italy) **Luciano Spalletti**	• Empoli (1994, 1995–1998) • Sampdoria (1998, 1999) • Venezia (1999, 1999–2000) • Udinese (2001, 2002–2005) • Ancona (2001–2002) • Roma (2005–2009, 2016–2017) • Zenit Saint Petersburg (2009–2014) • Inter Milan (2017–2019) • Napoli (2021–2023) • Italy (2023–2025) • Juventus (2025–present)	1,084	560	266	258	51.66	?
123	(Scotland) Paddy Travers	• Dumbarton (1920–1922) • Aberdeen (1923–1938) • Clyde (1938–1956)	1,082	462	227	393	42.70	?
124	(Portugal) Jesualdo Ferreira	• Rio Maior (1981–1982) • Torreense (1982–1984, 1986–1987, 1989–1990) • Académica (1984) • Atlético (1985–1986) • Silves (1986) • Angola (1989) • Estrela da Amadora (1991) • FAR Rabat (1995–1996) • Portugal U21 (1996–2000) • Alverca (2000–2001) • Benfica (2001–2002) • Braga (2003–2006, 2013–2014) • Boavista (2006, 2020–2021) • Porto (2006–2010) • Málaga (2010) • Panathinaikos (2010–2012) • Sporting CP (2013) • Zamalek (2015, 2022–2023) • Al Sadd (2015–2019) • Santos (2019–2020)	1,081	552	246	283	51.06	?
124	(Spain) Joaquín Caparrós	• Gimnástico Alcázar (1990–1992) • Conquense (1992–1993) • Manzanares (1994–1995) • Moralo (1995–1996) • Recreativo (1996–1999) • Andalusia (1998–2000) • Villarreal (1999) • Sevilla (2000–2005, 2018, 2019, 2025) • Deportivo La Coruña (2005–2007) • Athletic Bilbao (2007–2011) • Neuchâtel Xamax (2011) • Mallorca (2011–2013) • Levante (2013–2014) • Granada (2014–2015) • Osasuna (2016–2017) • Al Ahli (2017) • Armenia (2020–2022)	1,081	446	283	352	41.26	?
126	(Germany) **Jürgen Klopp**	• Mainz 05 (2001–2008) • Borussia Dortmund (2008–2015) • Liverpool (2015–2024) • Germany (2026–present)	1,080	588	256	236	54.44	?
126	(England) **Ian Holloway**	• Bristol Rovers (1996–2001) • Queens Park Rangers (2001–2006, 2016–2018) • Plymouth Argyle (2006–2007) • Leicester City (2007–2008) • Blackpool (2009–2012) • Crystal Palace (2012–2013) • Millwall (2014–2015) • Grimsby Town (2019–2020) • Swindon Town (2024–present)	1,080	397	292	391	36.39	
128	(England) Ron Atkinson	• Kettering Town (1971–1974) • Cambridge United (1974–1978) • West Bromwich Albion (1978–1981, 1987–1988) • Manchester United (1981–1986) • Atlético Madrid (1988–1989) • Sheffield Wednesday (1989–1991, 1997–1998) • Aston Villa (1991–1994) • Coventry City (1995–1996) • Nottingham Forest (1999)	1,078	464	306	308	43.04	?
129	(Portugal) Fernando Santos	• Estoril (1988–1994) • Estrela Amadora (1994–1998) • Porto (1998–2001) • AEK Athens (2001–2002, 2004–2006) • Panathinaikos (2002) • Sporting CP (2003–2004) • Benfica (2006–2007) • PAOK (2007–2010) • Greece (2010–2014) • Portugal (2014–2022) • Poland (2023) • Beşiktaş (2024) • Azerbaijan (2024–2025)	1,075	532	266	277	49.49	?
130	(Paraguay) Manuel Fleitas Solich	• Paraguay (1922–1929, 1939, 1945–1946, 1947–1953) • Lanús (1932, 1937, 1946) • Quilmes (1934–1935, 1947) • Talleres (1936) • Olimpia (1942) • Libertad (1943–1944) • Flamengo (1953–1957, 1958–1959, 1960–1962, 1971) • Real Madrid (1959–1960) • Fluminense (1962) • Corinthians (1962) • Palmeiras (1966) • Atlético Mineiro (1967–1968) • Bahia (1970–1971)	1,073	557	216	302	51.91	?
131	(Republic of Ireland) **Stephen Kenny**	• Longford Town (1998–2001) • Bohemians (2001–2004) • Derry City (2004–2006, 2007–2011) • Dunfermline Athletic (2006–2007) • Shamrock Rovers (2011–2012) • Dundalk (2012–2018) • Republic of Ireland U21 (2018–2020) • Republic of Ireland (2020–2023) • St Patrick's Athletic (2024–present)	1,072	582	244	246	54.29	?
132	(Spain) Antonio Iriondo	• Carabanchel (1992–1993) • Villaviciosa (1993–1994) • Rayo Majadahonda (1994–1998, 2012–2019, 2020–2021) • Amorós (1998–1999) • Manchego (1999–2000) • Madridejos (2000–2001) • Atlético Pinto (2001–2002) • Rayo Vallecano B (2002–2003, 2003–2004) • Rayo Vallecano (2003) • SS Reyes (2004–2005) • Toledo (2005–2007, 2010) • CD San Fernando (2007–2009) • San Fernando CD (2011–2012) • Jamshedpur (2019–2020) • Sanluqueño (2022–2023)	1,070	464	266	340	43.36	?
133	(Germany) Ottmar Hitzfeld	• Zug 94 (1983–1984) • Aarau (1984–1988) • Grasshoppers (1988–1991) • Borussia Dortmund (1991–1997) • Bayern Munich (1998–2004, 2007–2008) • Switzerland (2008–2014)	1,067	590	256	221	55.30	?
134	(England) Danny Wilson	• Barnsley (1994–1998, 2013–2015) • Sheffield Wednesday (1998–2000) • Bristol City (2000–2004) • Milton Keynes Dons (2004–2006) • Hartlepool United (2006–2008) • Swindon Town (2008–2011) • Sheffield United (2011–2013) • Chesterfield (2015–2017)	1,066	422	276	368	39.55	?
135	(England) **Steve Cotterill**	• Sligo Rovers (1995–1996) • Cheltenham Town (1997–2002, 2025–present) • Stoke City (2002) • Burnley (2004–2007) • Notts County (2010) • Portsmouth (2010–2011) • Nottingham Forest (2011–2012) • Bristol City (2013–2016) • Birmingham City (2017–2018) • Shrewsbury Town (2020–2023) • Forest Green Rovers (2024–2025)	1,065	434	277	354	40.8	
136	(England) Sam Allardyce	• Limerick (1991–1992) • Preston North End (1992) • Blackpool (1994–1996) • Notts County (1997–1999) • Bolton Wanderers (1999–2007) • Newcastle United (2007–2008) • Blackburn Rovers (2008–2010) • West Ham United (2011–2015) • Sunderland (2015–2016) • England (2016) • Crystal Palace (2016–2017) • Everton (2017–2018) • West Bromwich Albion (2020–2021) • Leeds United (2023)	1,064	411	284	369	38.63	
136	(Brazil) **Vagner Mancini**	• Paulista (2004–2007) • Al-Nasr SC (2007) • Grêmio (2007–2008, 2021–2022) • Vitória (2008–2009, 2009, 2015–2016, 2017–2018) • Santos (2009) • Vasco da Gama (2009–2010) • Guarani (2010) • Ceará (2011, 2023–2024) • Cruzeiro (2011–2012) • Sport Recife (2012) • Náutico (2013) • Atlético Paranaense (2013) • Botafogo (2014) • Chapecoense (2016–2017) • São Paulo (2019) • Atlético Mineiro (2019) • Atlético Goianiense (2020, 2024) • Corinthians (2020–2021) • América Mineiro (2021, 2022–2023) • Goiás (2024, 2025) • Red Bull Bragantino (2025–present)	1,064	431	269	364	40.33	?
138	(Scotland) Jock Stein	• Dunfermline Athletic (1960–1964) • Hibernian (1964–1965) • Scotland (1965, 1978–1985) • Celtic (1965–1978) • Leeds United (1978)	1,063	673	180	210	63.31	?
138	(Northern Ireland) **Stephen Baxter**	• Crusaders (2005–2024) • Carrick Rangers (2024–present)	1,063	583	180	300	54.84	?
140	(Brazil) **Renato Gaúcho**	• Fluminense (1996, 2002–2003, 2003, 2007–2008, 2009, 2013–2014, 2025) • Madureira (2001) • Vasco da Gama (2005–2007, 2008, 2026–present) • Bahia (2009–2010) • Grêmio (2010–2011, 2013, 2016–2021, 2022–2024) • Atlético Paranaense (2011) • Flamengo (2021)	1,058	511	266	281	48.30	?
141	(Brazil) Luís Alonso Pérez	• Santos (1954–1966) • Portuguesa Santista (1967) • Corinthians (1967–1968) • Portuguesa (1968–1969) • Santo André (1971)	1,055	663	170	222	62.84	?
142	(Brazil) Otto Glória	• Vasco da Gama (1951–1952, 1963, 1979) • Benfica (1954–1959, 1968–1970) • Belenenses (1959–1961, 1968–1970) • Sporting CP (1961, 1965–1966) • Olympique de Marseille (1962) • Porto (1963–1965) • Portugal (1964–1966, 1982–1983) • Atlético Madrid (1966–1968) • Grêmio (1971–1972) • Portuguesa (1973–1977) • Santos (1977) • Nigeria (1978–1981) • Monterrey (1978–1979)	1,049	543	277	229	51.76	?
143	(Socialist Federal Republic of Yugoslavia) (Croatia) Tomislav Ivić	• RNK Split (1967–1968) • Šibenik (1972–1973) • Yugoslavia (1973–1974) • Hajduk Split (1973–1976, 1978–1980, 1997) • Ajax (1976–1978) • Anderlecht (1980–1982) • Galatasaray (1983–1984) • Dinamo Zagreb (1984–1985) • Panathinaikos (1985–1986) • Avellino (1986) • Porto (1987–1988, 1993–1994) • Paris Saint-Germain (1988–1990) • Atlético Madrid (1990–1991) • Marseille (1991, 2001, 2001) • Benfica (1992) • Croatia (1994) • Fenerbahçe (1994–1995) • United Arab Emirates (1995–1996) • Al Wasl (1996) • Iran (1997–1998) • Persepolis (1997–1998) • Standard Liège (1998–1999, 2000) • Al-Ittihad (2003–2004)	1,047	565	250	232	53.96	?
143	(England) Steve Coppell	• Crystal Palace (1984–1993, 1995–1996, 1997–1998, 1999–2000) • Manchester City (1996) • Brentford (2001–2002) • Brighton & Hove Albion (2002–2003) • Reading (2003–2009) • Bristol City (2010) • Kerala Blasters (2016) • Jamshedpur (2017–2018) • ATK (2018–2019)	1,047	418	276	353	39.92	?
145	(Spain) Pep Guardiola	• Barcelona B (2007–2008) • Barcelona (2008–2012) • Bayern Munich (2013–2016) • Manchester City (2016–2026)	1,043	744	164	135	71.57	
146	(Republic of Ireland) Mick McCarthy	• Millwall (1992–1996) • Republic of Ireland (1996–2002, 2018–2020) • Sunderland (2003–2006) • Wolverhampton Wanderers (2006–2012) • Ipswich Town (2012–2018) • APOEL (2020–2021) • Cardiff City (2021) • Blackpool (2023)	1,041	398	281	362	38.23	
147	(Argentina) **Gustavo Costas**	• Racing Club (1999–2000, 2007, 2023–2026) • Guaraní (2001–2003, 2019–2021) • Alianza Lima (2003–2004, 2009–2011) • Cerro Porteño (2004–2007, 2026–present) • Olimpia (2008) • Al-Nassr (2011) • Barcelona SC (2012–2013) • Santa Fe (2014–2015, 2016–2017) • Atlas (2015–2016) • Al-Fayha (2017–2018) • Palestino (2022) • Bolivia (2022–2023)	1,039	487	250	302	46.87	?
148	(Ecuador) Carlos Sevilla	• Deportivo Quito (1984–1986, 1991, 2008, 2010, 2014, 2015) • Técnico Universitario (1987) • Macará (1988, 2000, 2005, 2010) • El Nacional (1989–1990, 2004, 2013) • Green Cross (1992–1993) • ESPOLI (1994, 1997) • LDU Quito (1995–1996) • Emelec (1997–1998, 2001–2002, 2007) • Ecuador (1999) • Manta (2003) • Cienciano (2005) • Barcelona (2005) • Deportivo Azogues (2006–2007) • Independiente José Terán (2011–2012) • Olmedo (2015) • Fuerza Amarilla (2016) • Clan Juvenil (2017)	1,034	?	?	?	?	
149	(Brazil) **Dorival Júnior**	• Ferroviária (2002) • Figueirense (2003–2004) • Fortaleza (2004–2005) • Criciúma (2005) • Juventude (2005) • Sport Recife (2005–2006) • Avaí (2006) • São Caetano (2006–2007) • Cruzeiro (2007) • Coritiba (2008) • Vasco da Gama (2008–2009, 2013) • Santos (2009–2010, 2015–2017) • Atlético Mineiro (2010–2011) • Internacional (2011–2012) • Flamengo (2012–2013, 2018, 2022) • Fluminense (2013) • Palmeiras (2014) • São Paulo (2017–2018, 2023–2024) • Athletico Paranaense (2019–2020) • Ceará (2022) • Brazil (2024–2025) • Corinthians (2025–present)	1,032	506	243	283	49.36	?
150	(Belgium) Georges Leekens	• Cercle Brugge (1984–1987, 1993–1994) • Anderlecht (1987–1988) • Kortrijk (1988–1989, 2009–2010) • Club Brugge (1989–1991, 2012) • KV Mechelen (1991–1992) • Trabzonspor (1992–1993) • Charleroi (1994–1995) • Excelsior Mouscron (1995–1997, 2003–2004) • Belgium (1997–1999, 2010–2012) • KSC Lokeren (1999–2001, 2007–2009, 2015–2016) • Roda JC (2001–2002) • Algeria (2002–2003, 2016–2017) • Gent (2004–2007) • Al-Hilal (2009) • Tunisia (2014–2015) • Hungary (2017–2018) • Étoile du Sahel (2018) • Tractor (2019)	1,024	451	305	268	44.04	?
151	(Brazil) Émerson Leão	• Sport Recife (1987, 2000, 2009) • São José (1988, 1990) • Coritiba (1988) • Palmeiras (1989, 2005–2006) • Portuguesa (1990, 1992) • XV de Piracicaba (1991) • Shimizu S-Pulse (1992–1994) • Juventude (1995, 2001) • Athletico Paranaense (1996) • Verdy Kawasaki (1996) • Atlético Mineiro (1997, 2007, 2009) • Santos (1998–1999, 2002–2004, 2008) • Internacional (1999) • Grêmio (2000) • Cruzeiro (2004) • São Paulo (2004–2005, 2011–2012) • Vissel Kobe (2005) • São Caetano (2006, 2012) • Corinthians (2006–2007) • Al Sadd (2008) • Goiás (2010)	1,023	508	255	260	49.66	?
152	(Brazil) Oswaldo de Oliveira	• Corinthians (1999–2000, 2004, 2017) • Vasco da Gama (2000) • Fluminense (2001–2002, 2006, 2019) • São Paulo (2002–2003) • Flamengo (2003, 2015) • Vitória (2004) • Santos (2005, 2014) • Al Ahli (2005–2006) • Cruzeiro (2006) • Kashima Antlers (2007–2011) • Botafogo (2012–2013) • Palmeiras (2015) • Sport Recife (2016) • Al-Arabi (2017) • Atlético Mineiro (2017–2018) • Urawa Red Diamonds (2018–2019)	1,022	493	241	288	48.24	?
153	(Italy) Francesco Guidolin	• Giorgione (1988–1989) • Treviso (1989–1990) • Fano (1990–1991) • Empoli (1991–1992) • Ravenna (1992–1993) • Atalanta (1993) • Vicenza (1994–1998) • Udinese (1998–1999, 2010–2014) • Bologna (1999–2003) • Palermo (2004–2005, 2006–2007, 2007, 2007–2008) • Genoa (2005) • Monaco (2005–2006) • Parma (2008–2010) • Swansea City (2016)	1,012	389	310	313	38.44	?
154	(Socialist Federal Republic of Yugoslavia) (Bosnia and Herzegovina) Ivica Osim	• Željezničar (1978–1986) • Yugoslavia (1986–1992) • Partizan (1991–1992) • Panathinaikos (1992–1994) • Sturm Graz (1994–2002) • JEF United Chiba (2003–2006) • Japan (2006–2007)	1,010	510	230	270	50.50	?
154	(Italy) Edoardo Reja	• Pordenone (1981) • Monselice (1982–1983) • Pro Gorizia (1983–1984) • Treviso (1984–1985, 1985) • Mestre (1985–1986) • Varese (1987) • Pescara (1989–1990) • Cosenza (1990–1992) • Hellas Verona (1992–1993) • Bologna (1993–1994) • Lecce (1994–1995) • Brescia (1996–1997) • Torino (1997–1998) • Vicenza (1999–2001) • Genoa (2001–2002) • Catania (2003) • Cagliari (2003–2004) • Napoli (2005–2009) • Hajduk Split (2009–2010) • Lazio (2010–2012, 2014) • Atalanta (2015–2016) • Albania (2019–2022) • Gorica (2023)	1,010	391	292	327	38.71	?
156	(Greece) Georgios Paraschos	• Kastoria (1989–1992) • Trikala (1993–1994) • Anagennisi Karditsa (1994–1995) • Kavala (1995–1997, 1999–2000) • Iraklis (1997–1998, 2011) • APOEL (1998) • Aris (1998–1999) • PAS Giannina (2000–2001, 2009) • Paniliakos (2001) • Olympiacos Volou (2001) • Akratitos (2002) • Chalkidona (2002–2005) • Atromitos (2005–2007, 2013–2014, 2021) • PAOK (2007) • OFI (2007–2008, 2010) • Xanthi (2008–2009, 2010, 2019–2020) • Panionios (2010, 2010; caretaker) • Levadiakos (2011–2013) • Platanias (2015–2017) • Apollon Smyrnis (2017–2018, 2020–2021) • Asteras Tripolis (2018–2019)	1,009	395	253	361	39.15	?
157	(Argentina) **Diego Simeone**	• Racing Club (2006, 2011) • Estudiantes (2006–2007) • River Plate (2007–2008) • San Lorenzo (2009–2010) • Catania (2011) • Atlético Madrid (2011–present)	1,008	567	226	215	56.25	?
157	(Chile) **Luis Marcoleta**	• Las Ánimas (1994–1995) • Deportes Talcahuano (1997–1999) • Universidad de Concepción (2000) • Deportes Antofagasta (2001–2002, 2025–present) • Unión La Calera (2003) • Deportes Concepción (2004) • Ñublense (2004–2007, 2010–2011) • Curicó Unido (2008–2010, 2015–2018) • San Marcos de Arica (2012–2014) • Everton (2014) • Deportes La Serena (2018–2019) • Rangers (2020–2021) • Deportes Valdivia (2021–2023) • Santiago Morning (2023–2025)	1,008	421	262	325	50.43	
157	(Turkey) Şenol Güneş	• Trabzonspor (1988–1989, 1993–1997, 2005, 2009–2013) • Boluspor (1989–1992) • Antalyaspor (1997–1998) • Sakaryaspor (1998–1999) • Turkey (2000–2004, 2019–2021) • FC Seoul (2007–2009) • Bursaspor (2014–2015) • Beşiktaş (2015–2019, 2022–2023)	1,008	514	263	231	50.99	?
160	(Socialist Federal Republic of Yugoslavia) (Serbia) Vujadin Boškov	• Yugoslavia (1971–1973, 1999–2000, 2001) • ADO Den Haag (1974–1976) • Feyenoord (1976–1978) • Zaragoza (1978–1979) • Real Madrid (1979–1982) • Sporting Gijón (1982–1984) • Ascoli (1984–1986) • Sampdoria (1986–1992, 1997–1998) • Roma (1992–1993) • Napoli (1994–1996) • Servette (1996) • Perugia (1999)	1,006	432	308	266	42.94	?
161	(Germany) Christoph Daum	• 1. FC Köln (1986–1990, 2006–2009) • VfB Stuttgart (1990–1993) • Beşiktaş (1994–1996, 2001–2002) • Bayer Leverkusen (1996–2000) • Austria Wien (2002–2003) • Fenerbahçe (2003–2006, 2009–2010) • Eintracht Frankfurt (2011) • Club Brugge (2011–2012) • Bursaspor (2012–2013) • Romania (2016–2017)	1,005	530	236	239	52.74	?
162	(England) John Lyall	• West Ham United (1974–1989) • Ipswich Town (1990–1994)	1,001	385	269	347	38.46	?
162	(Spain) **Emilio Larraz**	• Illueca (1997–1998) • Endesa Andorra (1998–2000, 2004–2007) • Andorra (2000–2002) • Sariñena (2003–2004, 2011–2013) • Teruel (2007–2009) • La Muela (2009–2010) • Deportivo Aragón (2010–2011, 2013–2014, 2021–2025, 2025–present) • Ebro (2015–2018) • Racing de Ferrol (2018–2021) • Real Zaragoza (2025)	1,001	494	260	247	49.35	
164	(South Africa) **Gavin Hunt**	• Seven Stars (1995–1998) • Hellenic (1998–2001) • Black Leopards (2001–2002) • Moroka Swallows (2002–2007) • SuperSport United (2007–2013, 2022–2025) • Bidvest Wits (2013–2020) • Kaizer Chiefs (2020–2021) • Chippa United (2021) • Durban City (2025) • Stellenbosch (2026–present)	1,000+	?	?	?	?	
164	(Czech Republic) Jozef Jankech	• Třinec (1966–1973) • Košice (1973–1975, 1991) • Lokomotíva Košice (1975–1976, 1978–1980, 1983–1985) • Strojárne Martin (1976–1978) • Nea Salamina (1980–1983) • MŠK Žilina (1985–1987) • Czechoslovakia Olympic team (1985–1987) • Trenčín (1987–1988) • Slovan Bratislava (1988–1990, 2005–2007, 2010) • Kuala Lumpur City (1990–1991) • Inter Bratislava (1991–1992) • Slovan Levice (1993, 1994–1995) • Qatar SC (1993–1994) • Slovakia (1995–1998) • Dubnica (1998–1999, 2003–2004) • Maldives (2000–2003, 2007–2008) • Dukla Banská Bystrica (2008–2010)	1,000+	?	?	?	?	
164	(England) Gordon Bartlett	• Southall (1985–1986) • Hounslow (1986–1989) • Yeading (1991–1995) • Wealdstone (1995–2017)	1,000+	?	?	?	?	?
164	(England) Dave Diaper	• Sholing (1999–2023)	1,000+	?	?	?	?	
164	(France) Philippe Clément	• Dives-Cabourg (1994–2026)	1,000+	?	?	?	?	?
164	(England) **Tommy Sloan**	• Auchinleck Talbot (2003–present)	1,000+	?	?	?	?	
164	(England) **Marc White**	• Dorking Wanderers (2007–present)	1,000+	324	118	191	51.27	

=== By nationality ===
Nationality	Number
England	37
Brazil	32
Scotland	15
Spain	12
Italy	11
Argentina	6
Germany	6
Northern Ireland	5
France	5
Portugal	4
Chile	4
Bosnia and Herzegovina	3
Ukraine	3
Colombia	3
Greece	2
Mexico	2
Wales	2
Ireland	2
Russia	2
Belgium	1
Croatia	1
Czech Republic	1
Netherlands	1
Paraguay	1
Romania	1
Serbia	1
Sweden	1
Turkey	1
Turkmenistan	1
South Africa	1
Ecuador	1
Slovakia	1
Austria	1
Total	170

== National team managers with 100 or more matches ==
Managers that are still active are highlighted in bold.

Name	Age	Span	Matches	Countries managed
(Socialist Federal Republic of Yugoslavia) (Serbia) Bora Milutinović	82	26	273	8: Mexico, Costa Rica, United States, Nigeria, China, Honduras, Jamaica, Iraq
(Colombia) **Hernán Darío Gómez**	70	30	274	5: Colombia (73), Ecuador (79), Guatemala (21), Panama (71), Honduras, (9), El Salvador
(Portugal) **Carlos Queiroz**	73	26	262	7: Portugal (50), United Arab Emirates (16), South Africa (24), Iran (106), Colombia (18), Egypt (20), Qatar (11), Oman
(Germany) Berti Vogts	79	24	230	5: Germany (102), Kuwait (11), Scotland (31), Nigeria (15), Azerbaijan (71)
(Uruguay) Óscar Tabárez	79	17	228	1: Uruguay
(Colombia) **Reinaldo Rueda**	69	16	232	4: Colombia (68), Honduras, Ecuador (50), Chile (27)
(Sweden) Lars Lagerbäck	78	16	211	4: Sweden, Nigeria, Iceland, Norway
(Brazil) Carlos Alberto Parreira	83	43	200	5: Ghana, Kuwait, Brazil, United Arab Emirates, South Africa
(Germany) Joachim Löw	66	15	198	1: Germany
(Portugal) Fernando Santos	72	14	175	4: Greece (49), Portugal (109), Poland (6), Azerbaijan (11)
(France) **Didier Deschamps**	58	12	171	1: France
(France) **Hervé Renard**	58	16	170	5: Zambia (42), Angola (3), Ivory Coast (18), Morocco (45), Saudi Arabia
(Germany) Sepp Herberger	79	28	167	2: Germany (70), West Germany (97)
(Denmark) Morten Olsen	77	15	163	1: Denmark
(Germany) Otto Pfister	88	16	162	12: Rwanda (?), Upper Volta (?), Senegal (34), Ivory Coast (30), Zaire (?), Ghana (?), Bangladesh (18), Saudi Arabia (45), Togo (5), Cameroon (15), Trinidad and Tobago (7), Afghanistan (9)
(Soviet Union) (Ukraine) Valeriy Lobanovskyi	63	15	157	4: Soviet Union (79), United Arab Emirates (19), Kuwait (41), Ukraine (18)
(Poland) Henryk Kasperczak	80	24	155	5: Ivory Coast, Tunisia, Morocco, Mali, Senegal
(Germany) Jürgen Klinsmann	62	12	150	3: Germany (34), United States (98), South Korea (18)
(United States) Bruce Arena	75	19	148	1: United States
(Germany) **Gernot Rohr**	73	15	142	5: Gabon (19), Niger (23), Burkina Faso (11), Nigeria (64), Benin
(Netherlands) **Dick Advocaat**	79	32	140	8: Netherlands (64), United Arab Emirates (2), South Korea (18), Belgium (5), Russia (25), Serbia (4), Iraq (6), Curaçao
(England) Walter Winterbottom	88	16	139	1: England
(Germany) Helmut Schön	80	14	139	1: West Germany
(Turkey) Fatih Terim	73	24	135	1: Turkey
(Hungary) Lajos Baróti	91	21	132	2: Hungary, Peru
(Austria) Hugo Meisl	55	18	131	2: Austria-Hungary, Austria
(Poland) Antoni Piechniczek	84	16	128	3: Poland, Tunisia, United Arab Emirates
(Portugal) **Paulo Bento**	57	15	128	3: Portugal (47), South Korea (57), United Arab Emirates
(England) Roy Hodgson	79	24	127	4: Switzerland (41), United Arab Emirates (2), Finland (28), England (56)
(Argentina) Guillermo Stábile	61	21	127	1: Argentina
(Belgium) **Tom Saintfiet**	53	16	124	12: Namibia (15), Zimbabwe (0), Ethiopia (5), Yemen (11), Malawi (5), Togo (10), Bangladesh (3), Trinidad and Tobago (4), Malta (3), Gambia (44), Philippines (4), Mali (20)
(Brazil) Mário Zagallo	95	7	124	4: Brazil (?), Kuwait (31), Saudi Arabia (37), United Arab Emirates (24)
(Socialist Federal Republic of Yugoslavia) (Bosnia and Herzegovina) Vahid Halilhodžić	74	11	122	4: Ivory Coast (22), Algeria (30), Japan (38), Morocco (32)
(Spain) Vicente del Bosque	75	8	114	1: Spain
(Argentina) José Pékerman	77	17	114	3: Argentina (27), Colombia (77), Venezuela (10)
(Belgium) Guy Thys	80	14	114	1: Belgium
(England) Alf Ramsey	79	11	113	1: England
(Socialist Federal Republic of Yugoslavia) (Bosnia and Herzegovina) (Croatia) Miroslav Blažević	87	9	111	4: Switzerland (2), Croatia (73), Iran (19), Bosnia and Herzegovina (17)
(Italy) Giovanni Trapattoni	87	11	108	2: Italy (44), Ireland (64)
(Romania) Anghel Iordănescu	76	10	108	2: Romania (101), Greece (7)
(Mexico) Ignacio Trelles	103	31	106	1: Mexico
(Germany) Otto Rehhagel	88	9	106	1: Greece
(Argentina) **Lionel Scaloni**	48	8	103	1: Argentina
(Argentina) **Ricardo Gareca**	68	8	102	2: Peru (96), Chile
(England) Gareth Southgate	56	8	102	1: England

== See also ==
- List of current Premier League and English Football League managers
- List of longest managerial reigns in association football
- List of world association football records
- List of Premier League managers
