= Enrico Geroni =

Italian footballer (born 1989)

Personal information
- Date of birth: 18 June 1989 (age 37)
- Place of birth: Florence, Italy
- Height: 1.86 m (6 ft 1 in)
- Position: Midfielder

Team information
- Current team: GSD Vianese Calcio

Youth career
- –2007: Prato
- 2006–2007: → AlbinoLeffe (loan)
- 2007–2008: AlbinoLeffe

Senior career*
Years	Team	Apps	(Gls)
2008–2015	AlbinoLeffe	41	(1)
2011	→ Barletta (loan)	7	(1)
2011–2012	→ Prato (loan)	22	(1)
2013–2014	→ Carrarese (loan)	14	(1)
2015	Aversa Normanna	13	(1)
2015–2018	Olbia	48	(3)
2018–2019	AC Rezzato	23	(2)
2019–2020	Crema	21	(0)
2020–2021	Costa Orientale Sarda	25	(4)
2021–2022	Ponsacco	32	(1)
2022–2026	Sasso Marconi	56	(7)
2026–	GSD Vianese Calcio		
- * Club domestic league appearances and goals as of 4 November 2026

Enrico Geroni (born 18 June 1989) is an Italian footballer who plays as a midfielder for GSD Vianese Calcio.

== Biography ==
Born in Florence, Tuscany, Geroni was a youth product of Prato. In 2006, he was signed by Lombard club AlbinoLeffe. Geroni made his senior debut for the club in a 2–2 draw with Grosseto on 4 October 2008.

On 29 July 2010, he signed a new five-year contract with club along with Alessandro Salvi and Manuel Daffara; all three youth products fulfill the criteria of having reached a certain number of professional appearances and eligible to sign a contract of maximum of five years instead of three years in protection period. Geroni and Paolo Maino were signed by Barletta on 11 January 2011.

In summer 2011 he was signed by Prato. On 8 July 2013 Geroni left AlbinoLeffe again for Carrarese. On 2 February 2016 he left the club again for Aversa Normanna in a definitive deal.

In December 2015 he was signed by Serie D club Olbia. The club was promoted to Lega Pro to fill the vacancies.
