= Simone Bentivoglio =

Italian footballer (born 1985)

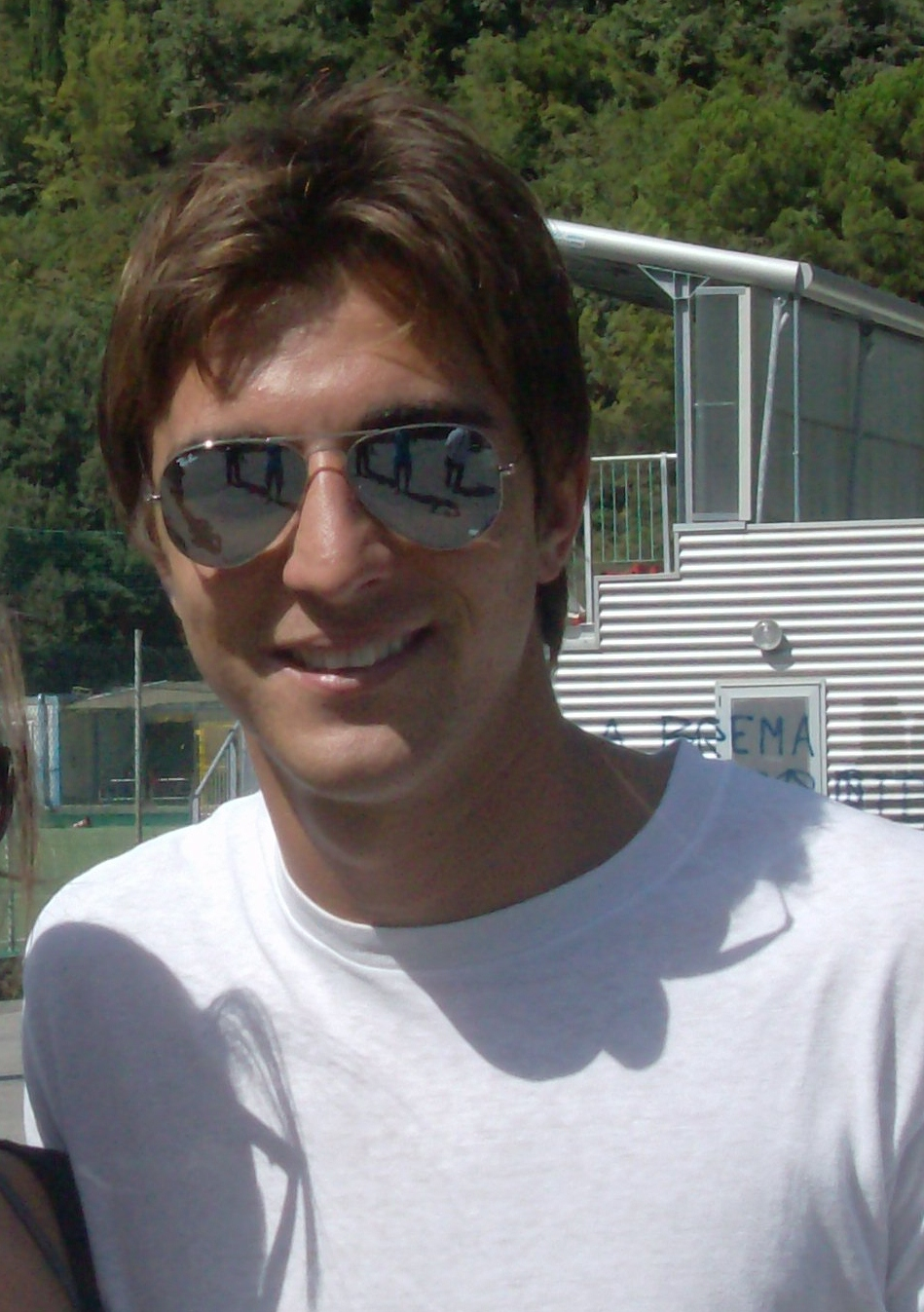

Personal information
- Date of birth: 29 May 1985 (age 41)
- Place of birth: Pinerolo, Italy
- Height: 1.83 m (6 ft 0 in)
- Position: Midfielder

Youth career
- 2004–2005: Juventus

Senior career*
Years	Team	Apps	(Gls)
2005–2006	→ Mantova (loan)	16	(0)
2006–2015	Chievo	96	(8)
2006–2007	→ Modena (loan)	34	(0)
2011	→ Bari (loan)	16	(2)
2011–2012	→ Sampdoria (loan)	15	(1)
2012	→ Padova (loan)	19	(0)
2014–2015	→ Brescia (loan)	32	(0)
2015–2016	Modena	25	(2)
2016–2019	Venezia	77	(7)
2019–2020	Siena	3	(0)
2020	→ Virtus Verona (loan)	8	(1)
2020–2021	Virtus Verona	24	(0)
2021–2022	Vigasio	20	(3)

International career
2004–2005	Italy U-20	13	(0)
2006	Italy U-21	1	(0)

Managerial career
- 2022: Vigasio
- 2024: Arzignano
- * Club domestic league appearances and goals as of 2 May 2021

Simone Bentivoglio (born 29 May 1985) is an Italian football coach and former midfielder.

== Club career ==
He started his professional career at Juventus. After he spent on loan at Mantova os Serie B, A.C. ChievoVerona bought him in co-ownership deal, for €220,000, but loaned him again to Modena of Serie B, along with Tommaso Chiecchi.

In June 2007, Chievo had to rebuild the team due to relegation, and Bentivoglio was signed permanently for €500,000.

Bentivoglio moved to Serie B club Sampdoria on 24 August 2011 for a season-long loan deal. On 26 January 2012 he was transferred to Padova.

After missing the 2012–2013 season for disqualification due to match-fixing, in the summer of 2013, he resumed with Chievo Verona. After the loan at Brescia in the 2014–2015 season, on 1 July 2015, he returned to Chievo Verona on 28 August but rescinded his contract by mutual agreement, thus remaining unattached; three days later he was hired by Modena. On 8 July 2016, he was presented as a new signing of Venezia.

On 23 July 2019, he signed with Siena. On 10 January 2020, he extended his contract with Siena until June 2021. He was loaned to Virtus Verona for the rest of the 2019–20 season.

On 6 August 2021, he joined amateur club SSD Vigasio.

== International career ==
Bentivoglio played with the Italy under-20 side in the 2005 FIFA World Youth Championship. He made his Italy U-21 team debut as a starter against Luxembourg U-21 on 12 December 2006.

== Coaching career ==
On 19 March 2024, Bentivoglio was hired as the new head coach of Serie C club Arzignano, with Siniša Anđelković as his assistant. Both were dismissed by the end of the 2023–24 season to make room for a new coaching staff.

Bentivoglio was hired by Piacenza later in 2024 to replace Stefano Rossini however, after taking one training session, Piacenza sacked him and re-hired Rossini.
