= Gianni Manfrin =

Italian footballer

Personal information
- Date of birth: 13 August 1993 (age 33)
- Place of birth: Este, Italy
- Height: 1.82 m (6 ft 0 in)
- Position: Defender

Youth career
- –2013: Chievo

Senior career*
Years	Team	Apps	(Gls)
2013–2018	Chievo	0	(0)
2013–2015	→ Modena (loan)	50	(1)
2015–2017	→ Alessandria (loan)	25	(0)
2017–2018	→ Reggiana (loan)	21	(1)
2018–2021	Virtus Verona	44	(5)
2022–2025	Virtus Verona	88	(7)

International career
2011	Italy U-18	2	(0)
- * Club domestic league appearances and goals as of 25 April 2025

Gianni Manfrin (born 13 August 1993) is an Italian football player.

== Club career ==
He made his Serie B debut for Modena on 24 August 2013 in a game against Palermo.

On 23 December 2018, he signed with Virtus Verona. He left the club as a free agent at the end of the 2020–21 season. On 22 January 2022, he signed a new contract with Virtus Verona for the remainder of the 2021–22 season.

== Personal life ==
On 31 January 2023, Manfrin was charged with gang rape and sentenced to six years in prison together with four other former teammates of his from his first period at Virtus Verona.
