= Marco Amadio =

Italian footballer (born 1999)

Personal information
- Date of birth: 3 June 1999 (age 27)
- Place of birth: Motta di Livenza, Italy
- Height: 1.77 m (5 ft 10 in)
- Position: Midfielder

Team information
- Current team: Virtus Verona
- Number: 7

Youth career
- –2019: Cremonese
- 2017–2018: → Sassuolo (loan)

Senior career*
Years	Team	Apps	(Gls)
2018–2019	Cremonese	0	(0)
2019	→ Como (loan)	5	(0)
2019–2020	Campodarsego	25	(3)
2020–2023	Virtus Verona	69	(2)
2023–2024	Renate	14	(0)
2024–	Virtus Verona	67	(3)
- * Club domestic league appearances and goals as of 30 April 2026

Marco Amadio (born 3 June 1999) is an Italian professional footballer who plays as a midfielder for Serie D club Virtus Verona.

== Club career ==
Formed on Cremonese youth sector, Amadio was loaned to Como in January 2019, and made his senior debut on Serie D.

For the next season, he joined Campodarsego.

On 1 September 2020, he signed with Serie C club Virtus Verona. Amadio made his professional debut on 27 September 2020 against Cesena.
