= Cristian Bucchi =

Italian footballer (born 1977)

Personal information
- Full name: Cristian Bucchi
- Date of birth: 30 May 1977 (age 49)
- Place of birth: Rome, Italy
- Height: 1.86 m (6 ft 1 in)
- Position: Forward

Team information
- Current team: Arezzo (head coach)

Senior career*
Years	Team	Apps	(Gls)
1995–1996	Sambenedettese	28	(0)
1996–1998	Settempeda	58	(52)
1998–2002	Perugia	37	(6)
1999–2000	→ Vicenza (loan)	30	(11)
2001–2002	→ Ternana (loan)	27	(9)
2002	→ Catania (loan)	13	(2)
2003–2004	Cagliari	10	(1)
2004	Ancona	12	(5)
2004–2005	Ascoli	41	(17)
2005–2006	Modena	41	(29)
2006–2011	Napoli	29	(8)
2007–2008	→ Siena (loan)	10	(0)
2008	→ Bologna (loan)	19	(5)
2008–2009	→ Ascoli (loan)	21	(3)
2009–2010	→ Cesena (loan)	24	(4)
2011	→ Pescara (loan)	11	(1)
Total		411	(153)

International career
1998–1999	Italy U21	3	(1)

Managerial career
- 2012–2013: Pescara (youth)
- 2013: Pescara
- 2013–2014: Gubbio
- 2015: Torres
- 2015–2016: Maceratese
- 2016–2017: Perugia
- 2017: Sassuolo
- 2018–2019: Benevento
- 2019: Empoli
- 2021–2022: Triestina
- 2022–2023: Ascoli
- 2025–: Arezzo
- * Club domestic league appearances and goals

Cristian Bucchi (born 30 May 1977) is an Italian football manager and former player who is the head coach of Serie B club Arezzo. A forward, he was best known for his goal-scoring ability in Serie B during the peak of his career.

== Club career ==
=== Early career ===
Bucchi started his career with the Serie D outfit Sambenedettese in 1995 as an 18-year-old. He made 28 appearances in his first proper season, although he scored no goals.

The Serie D outfit released him at the end of the season, and he decided to drop down two divisions to the amateur regional leagues (Promozione Marche). From 1996 to 1998, he enjoyed a fine couple of years where he collected a brilliant 52 goals in 58 games for Settempeda. The club also promoted to 1997–98 Eccellenza Marche. The 21-year-old's promising talent did not go unnoticed, and it showed as Serie A outfit Perugia took a very big gamble, in some respects, on a non-league striker. Soon after that, in a massive change of fortunes for the young forward, he was called up to the Italy U21s.

=== Perugia ===
After his big move to Serie A, he started straight away in his first season for the club, as Perugia finished mid-table in the 1998–99 season. He contributed five league goals, and it was a surprise that he adapted so quickly, considering he had been playing amateur football for little over a year. His second season did not go as well as his first.

He played the 1999–2000 season on loan to Vicenza, scoring eleven league goals that helped his team win the Serie B title. However, they returned to Serie B quickly after failing to avoid relegation the following season.

He returned in 2000 and was ready to start afresh. Coming back to the club and seeing the likes of Ahn Jung-Hwan and Fabrizio Miccoli ahead of him in pecking order, led to a very disappointing second season for Bucchi, after scoring just once in seven matches for Perugia. He was also suspended in the second half of season due to doping but shorten after appeal, made him available for 2001–02 Serie A. He left the club in October after only 3 appearances.

Bucchi scored nine goals for newly promoted Serie B side Ternana in 2001–02 Serie B, as the new boys stayed up in their first Serie B season of the 21st century.

=== Catania, Cagliari and Ancona ===
In the summer of 2002, he was signed by an ambitious, newly-promoted Serie B Sicilian outfit, Catania. However, things did not work out very well for Bucchi, as first-team opportunities proved challenging to come by, with the likes of Czech forward Jaroslav Sedivec, Luis Oliveira and Nassim Mendil all above him in the pecking order. He would go on to find the net just twice in thirteen appearances for the Sicilian side. He was allowed to leave in the winter and moved to Cagliari in the winter of 2002–03. Once again, he would have to wait for his chance, although with the likes of Fabrizio Cammarata, David Suazo and Luigi Beghetto already the first choice strikers, Bucchi would only feature ten times in his whole Sardinian career, scoring just once.

Bucchi joined Serie A basement boys Ancona in the second half of the 2003–04 season, after a very disappointing half-season in Sardinia, in a part-exchange deal which would see Roberto Maltagliati go the opposite way. He scored five goals in 12 matches. However, once again, and not for the first time in his career, his team suffered relegation, as Ancona set an all-time low in Serie A, amassing just 13 points all season.

Bucchi signed with Ascoli in a co-ownership deal with Chievo in August 2004, although Ascoli would be the club he would play for.

=== King of Serie B ===
==== Ascoli ====
In 2004–05, Bucchi scored 17 goals for Ascoli, accounting for one-third of the team's Serie B goal total of 51 that season, missing only one match. He became the club's top goalscorer, just three goals short of Serie B top scorer Gionatha Spinesi. His contribution was a key factor in Ascoli's fourth-placed finish and a place in the season's play-offs.

Despite Ascoli's play-off defeat to Torino (A 3–1 loss on aggregate), Ascoli, in bizarre circumstances (only 1 of the three original promoted teams went up – Genoa demoted to Serie C1, with their involvement in the Serie B match-fixing scandal that season & Torino had to play Serie B football for the following season, due to financial difficulties), gained promotion to Serie A for the first time in more than a decade.

==== Modena ====
In the summer of 2005, Ascoli sold their 50% share of Bucchi to Modena.

In 2005–06, Bucchi scored 29 goals for Modena and, in fact, one goal shy of contributing exactly half of the team's league goal total (59 goals). Consequently, he became Serie B top scorer that season, just one goal away from levelling Serie B's all-time top scorer, former Italian international striker Luca Toni, bagging 30 goals in 2003–04 for then-champions, Palermo. Bucchi's contribution would be vital in leading Modena to a play-off place, and he scored one goal in the away leg against Mantova. Modena ultimately lost to Mantova, despite the aggregate result being 1–1. This meant that both sides' final league positions would come into play (Mantova finished higher than Modena in the final league table, which meant Mantova would progress to the final).

=== Napoli and loans ===
During the 2006 January transfer window, rumours had linked him to Benfica. After a year with Modena, he was sold to newly promoted, and ambitious Napoli for €4 million. The complicated deal also included Modena sold Tommaso Chiecchi back to Chievo and signed Bucchi outright.

In Naples, he scored eight goals in 29 games, and the club finished as runner-up, securing promotion to Serie A. His striking partner, Emanuele Calaiò, scored 18.

==== Siena ====
Due to a surplus of players at Napoli in the new season, mainly due to new signings Ezequiel Lavezzi and Marcelo Zalayeta, he went on loan to Siena in the summer of 2007.

Bucchi had not made an appearance in Serie A since playing for Ancona in second half of 2003–04 season, but he failed to score any goals in his ten appearances for Siena.

==== Bologna ====
In January 2008, he was loaned to Bologna as one of their strikers, Danilevičius, asked to leave for more regular playing time. He scored five goals during his five-month stay at Bologna, contributing to the rossoblu's successful quest for promotion to the Italian top flight.

==== Ascoli ====
In July 2008, he agreed to return to Ascoli in another loan deal.

==== Cesena (loan) ====
On 10 July 2009, he was loaned to Cesena. He returned to Napoli at the start of 2010–11 season, and played a few games.

==== Pescara (loan) ====
On 4 January 2011, he was loaned to Serie B club Pescara and his contract with Napoli was terminated during the 2011–12 season by mutual consent.

== International career ==
For Italy, he has only represented his country at the Under-21 level. During his time in the team (1998–1999), he collected three U-21 caps, scoring one goal.

== Coaching career ==
=== Pescara ===
Bucchi became the head coach of the Primavera (under-19) team of Pescara in 2012. He obtained UEFA A License, the second highest in the category, with the highest score in the class in 2012. In March 2013, Bucchi was promoted as the head coach to their first team, following the sacking of previous coach Cristiano Bergodi. The team also hired Bruno Nobili as nominal head coach and de facto as Bucchi's assistant in order to bypass the bureaucratic ban, as UEFA A License was not qualified to coach Serie A and Serie B level, but UEFA Pro License qualified. The club also promoted his assistants in the Primavera, Mirko Savini and Ermanno Ciotti, to the first team, and re-hired Massimo Marini as goalkeeping coach, who had left the position along with Giovanni Stroppa in November 2012.

On 10 March 2013, Bucchi debuted as the head coach of the first team of delfini in a 2–1 away loss against Atalanta.

=== Gubbio ===
On 12 July 2013, Bucchi joined Gubbio as their head coach. He was fired in January 2014. In summer 2014, while unemployed, he obtained the UEFA Pro License.

=== Torres ===
In January 2015, Bucchi became the head coach of Torres. The team finished as the 11th of 2014–15 Lega Pro. However, the club later dropped to the bottom of the table due to a match fixing scandal for the matches in the first half of 2014–15 season.

=== Maceratese ===
Bucchi was the head coach of Maceratese in 2015–16 Lega Pro season. The team finished as the losing side of the promotion playoffs.

=== Perugia ===
On 15 June 2016, Bucchi was hired as the head coach of Serie B club Perugia.

=== Sassuolo ===
On 20 June 2017, Bucchi was signed by Sassuolo, replacing Roma-bound head coach Eusebio Di Francesco. On 27 November 2017, Bucchi was sacked.

=== Benevento ===
On 6 July 2018, Bucchi was appointed manager of Benevento.

=== Empoli ===
On 18 June 2019, Bucchi was appointed manager of Empoli. He was dismissed on 12 November 2019 after the team only gained 3 draws in 6 preceding league games.

=== Triestina ===
On 6 July 2021, Bucchi was hired as head coach of Triestina in Serie C. He guided Triestina to fifth place, who were then eliminated by eventual winners Palermo in the promotion playoffs.

=== Ascoli ===
On 14 June 2022, Bucchi was announced as the new head coach of Serie B club Ascoli, a club he played for as a player. He was sacked on 4 February 2023 following a negative string of results.

=== Arezzo ===
On 4 February 2025, after two years without a managerial job, Bucchi was hired as the new head coach of Serie C club Arezzo.

== Managerial statistics ==
As of 4 February 2023

Managerial record by team and tenure
Team	Nat	From	To	Record							
Team	Nat	From	To	G	W	D	L	GF	GA	GD	Win %
Pescara	(Italy)	5 March 2013	7 June 2013	11	0	1	10	7	30	−23	0.00
Gubbio	(Italy)	12 July 2013	15 January 2014	20	5	8	7	20	26	−6	25.00
Torres	(Italy)	6 January 2015	30 June 2015	19	5	9	5	18	17	+1	26.32
Maceratese	(Italy)	4 July 2015	15 June 2016	37	15	14	8	48	35	+13	40.54
Perugia	(Italy)	15 June 2016	20 June 2017	47	17	21	9	61	47	+14	36.17
Sassuolo	(Italy)	20 June 2017	27 November 2017	15	4	2	9	10	24	−14	26.67
Benevento	(Italy)	6 July 2018	18 June 2019	42	21	9	12	71	57	+14	50.00
Empoli	(Italy)	18 June 2019	12 November 2019	14	6	5	3	19	16	+3	42.86
Triestina	(Italy)	6 July 2021	13 June 2022	42	16	11	15	45	46	−1	38.10
Ascoli	(Italy)	14 June 2022	4 February 2023	25	7	9	9	31	34	−3	28.00
Total				272	96	89	87	330	332	−2	35.29
