= Alessandro Salvi =

Italian footballer (born 1988)

Personal information
- Date of birth: 5 June 1988 (age 38)
- Place of birth: Bergamo, Italy
- Height: 1.83 m (6 ft 0 in)
- Position: Right back

Team information
- Current team: AC Leon
- Number: 2

Youth career
- US Trealbe Calcio
- 2007–2008: AlbinoLeffe

Senior career*
| Years | Team | Apps | (Gls) |
| 2008–2015 | AlbinoLeffe | 120 | (2) |
| 2008–2010 | → Prato (loan) | 33 | (2) |
| 2015–2018 | Cittadella | 105 | (7) |
| 2018–2019 | Palermo | 21 | (2) |
| 2019–2021 | Frosinone | 50 | (3) |
| 2021–2023 | Ascoli | 31 | (1) |
| 2023–2026 | Cittadella | 101 | (2) |
| 2026– | AC Leon | 0 | (0) |
- * Club domestic league appearances and goals as of 9 October 2026

Alessandro Salvi (born 5 June 1988) is an Italian footballer who plays as a right back for AC Leon.

== Biography ==
Born in Bergamo, Lombardy, Salvi signed a youth contract with AlbinoLeffe in summer 2007 from local side of Treviolo, the Province of Bergamo. He then spent 2 seasons loaned to Lega Pro 2nd Divisione side Prato, which in the 2nd season joined along with Andrea Offredi. He made a break through that season, and eligible to sign a contract of maximum 5-year. (players which not yet reached the appearances criteria only able to sign a 3-year contract) On 29 July 2010, he signed a new 5-year contract with club along with Manuel Daffara and Enrico Geroni. On 13 July 2015, he joined Cittadella after the relegation of AlbinoLeffe.

He left Cittadella in 2018 to join Palermo, spending the 2018–19 Serie B with the Rosanero. After the club's exclusion from Italian football, he joined fellow Serie B club Frosinone.

On 5 August 2021, he signed a two-year contract with Ascoli.

On 6 January 2023, Salvi returned to Cittadella.
