= Neil Cugley =

English football manager

Neil Cugley is an English football manager who managed Folkestone Invicta.

== Early life ==
Cugley grew up and went to school in Folkestone, and played for the town cricket team.

== Playing career ==
Cugley made his debut at the age of eighteen for Folkestone Town, playing at centre-half in the 1970s before returned in the 1980s as a striker, scoring forty-six goals in 1982–83.

== Managerial career ==
In 1997, Cugley was appointed manager of Folkestone Invicta and in 2018 held the honour of the longest football managerial reign in England's top seven tiers after Arsenal manager Arsène Wenger retired that year. In 2022, during his twenty-sixth season as Invicta's manager, making him England's longest-serving manager, he decided to step down as the club's manager. Because of his long tenure as manager, he has been dubbed "Mr. Invicta".

== See also ==
- List of football managers with the most matches
