= Michael De Marchi =

Italian footballer

Personal information
- Date of birth: 30 August 1994 (age 32)
- Place of birth: Verona, Italy
- Height: 1.90 m (6 ft 3 in)
- Position: Forward

Team information
- Current team: Pergolettese
- Number: 14

Youth career
- Santa Lucia Golosine

Senior career*
Years	Team	Apps	(Gls)
2013–2014	Santa Lucia Golosine		(13)
2015–2016	Cerea		(21)
2016–2017	Carpi	7	(0)
2017	→ Prato (loan)	17	(0)
2017	Correggese	17	(3)
2017–2018	Virtus Verona	18	(4)
2018–2019	Imolese	41	(11)
2019–2021	Cittadella	17	(0)
2020–2021	→ Virtus Verona (loan)	12	(1)
2021–2022	Pescara	19	(3)
2022	→ Südtirol (loan)	16	(3)
2022–2024	Padova	32	(1)
2024	Taranto	17	(1)
2024–2026	Virtus Verona	41	(18)
2026–	Pergolettese	0	(0)
- * Club domestic league appearances and goals as of 30 April 2026

Michael De Marchi (born 30 August 1994) is an Italian professional footballer who plays as a forward for Serie C Group A club Pergolettese.

== Club career ==
On 3 July 2019, he signed with Cittadella.

On 25 September 2020, he returned to Virtus Verona on loan.

On 8 July 2021, he moved to Pescara. On 31 January 2022, De Marchi was loaned to Südtirol.

On 6 July 2022, De Marchi signed a two-season contract with Padova.

On 15 January 2024, De Marchi moved to Taranto. In August 2025 returned for the third time in Verona to Virtus Verona.
