= Luigi Fresco =

Italian football manager (born 1963)

Personal information
- Date of birth: 4 April 1961 (age 65)
- Place of birth: Rovereto, Italy

Team information
- Current team: Virtus Verona (head coach/chairman)

Managerial career
- Years: Team
- 1982–2026: Virtus Verona
- 2026–: Virtus Verona

Luigi "Gigi" Fresco (born 4 April 1961) is an Italian football coach and executive, currently in charge as head coach and chairman of Serie D club Virtus Verona.

== Football career ==
Fresco joined minor amateur club Virtus Verona as a child, first as a centre back and youth coach. In 1982 he was appointed chairman of Virtus Verona, and appointed himself as head coach of the club, who was at the time playing in Terza Categoria, the lowest division of Italian football. Under his tenure, the club emerged as a local force, climbing all the amateur football pyramid and eventually reaching Serie D in 2006. In 2013, after winning the Serie D playoffs and also due to a league vacancy, Virtus Verona was admitted to Lega Pro Seconda Divisione, thus marking the first time for the club in a professional league and also the first time the city of Verona had three professional clubs (the other two being Hellas Verona and ChievoVerona). The club was relegated back to Serie D by the end of the season, the first relegation during Fresco's tenure. In 2018, Virtus Verona returned to Serie C as league winners.

Under his tenure, Fresco also oversaw the club's transformation to a multi-sports club, with an eye on integrating immigrants and refugees in the Verona area.

On 5 March 2026, Fresco resigned from his role as head coach, with his assistant Tommaso Chiecchi replacing him at the helm of the first team. However, he returned in charge of the club just nineteen days later, on 24 March, after Chiecchi, who was reinstated as assistant, failed to turn the club's fortunes.

== Personal life ==
Fresco has a university degree in pedagogy.

== Honours ==
=== Managerial ===
Virtus Verona

- Serie D: 2017–18 (Group C)
- Eccellenza: 2005–06 (Veneto, Group A)

== See also ==
- List of longest managerial reigns in association football
- List of football managers with the most matches
