= Andrea Offredi =

Italian footballer (born 1988)

Personal information
- Full name: Andrea Angelo Offredi
- Date of birth: 17 February 1988 (age 38)
- Place of birth: Treviglio, Italy
- Height: 1.90 m (6 ft 3 in)
- Position: Goalkeeper

Youth career
- AlbinoLeffe

Senior career*
Years	Team	Apps	(Gls)
2008–2011	AlbinoLeffe	1	(0)
2008	→ Merate (loan)	12	(0)
2009–2010	→ Prato (loan)	3	(0)
Total		16	(0)
- * Club domestic league appearances and goals

Andrea Angelo Offredi (born 17 February 1988) is an Italian former footballer who plays as a goalkeeper.

== Biography ==
Born in Treviglio, the Province of Bergamo, Offredi started his career with AlbinoLeffe. In 2007–08 season, he was offered no.17 shirt of the first team. in January 2008, he left Primavera under-20 team of AlbinoLeffe and joined Serie D side Merate. In 2008–09 season, he changed to no.88 shirt and was the 4th keeper behind Antonio Narciso, Achille Coser and Saulo. He made his Serie B debut on 30 May 2009, the last round of the league, replaced Coser at half–time. AlbinoLeffe lead 1–0 at half–time but eventually lost to Ancona 3–4.

At the start of 2009–10 season, AlbinoLeffe either released or loaned all the keepers, and signed 4 new keeper to replace them (including Daniel Offredi, which A.Offredi moved to Lega Pro 2nd Divisione side Prato along with Alessandro Salvi.

Offredi received a call-up from Italy under-21 Serie B representative team along with Nicola Madonna on 4 October 2007, which they attended the training camp.
