= Sheikh Sibi =

Gambian footballer (born 1998)

Personal information
- Full name: Sheikh Sibi
- Date of birth: 21 February 1998 (age 28)
- Place of birth: Serekunda, The Gambia
- Height: 1.85 m (6 ft 1 in)
- Position: Goalkeeper

Team information
- Current team: Virtus Verona
- Number: 22

Youth career
- Tallinding United

Senior career*
Years	Team	Apps	(Gls)
2016–	Virtus Verona	175	(0)

International career^{‡}
2021–	Gambia	6	(0)
- * Club domestic league appearances and goals as of 25 April 2026 ‡ National team caps and goals as of 18 November 2025

Sheikh Sibi (born 21 February 1998) is a Gambian professional footballer who plays as a goalkeeper for Serie D club Virtus Verona and the Gambia national team.

== Early life ==
Sibi was born in Serekunda to a Gambian mother and a Mauritanian father. He left Gambia at the age of 16 with the hope of migrating to Europe. During the journey, he crossed the Sahara desert and reached Tripoli, where he worked as a painter for five months. In July 2015, he crossed the Mediterranean Sea in a boat and reached the Italian island of Lampedusa.

== Club career ==
Following his arrival in Italy, Sibi was assigned to Costagrande Reception Center in Verona. He soon moved to Virtus Vita, a non-profit organization which welcomes migrants. Since Virtus Vita and Virtus Verona were owned by the same company Vencomp, it helped Sibi to continue his football career.

Sibi made his club debut for Virtus Verona on 30 October 2016 in a 2–1 Serie D defeat to Union Feltre. He made his Serie C and professional debut on 16 September 2018 in a 2–0 defeat to Fermana.

== International career ==
Sibi has received several call-ups to the Gambia national team since June 2019. He made his international debut on 29 March 2021 in a 1–0 defeat to DR Congo. He played in the 2021 Africa cup of Nations, his national team's first continental tournament, where they made a sensational quarter-final.

== Career statistics ==
=== International ===
As of match played 18 November 2025

Appearances and goals by national team and year
National team	Year	Apps	Goals
Gambia	2021	3	0
Gambia	2022	0	0
Gambia	2024	2	0
Gambia	2025	1	0
Gambia	2026	0	0
Total		6	0
