= Leonardo Zarpellon =

Italian footballer

Personal information
- Date of birth: 22 May 1999 (age 27)
- Place of birth: Bassano del Grappa, Italy
- Height: 1.84 m (6 ft 0 in)
- Position: Midfielder

Team information
- Current team: Carpi

Youth career
- Bassano

Senior career*
Years	Team	Apps	(Gls)
2017–2018	Bassano	0	(0)
2018–2022	Vicenza	42	(1)
2020–2021	→ Virtus Verona (loan)	18	(0)
2021–2022	→ Virtus Verona (loan)	22	(0)
2022–2026	Virtus Verona	97	(5)
2026–	Carpi	0	(0)
- * Club domestic league appearances and goals as of 30 April 2026

Leonardo Zarpellon (born 22 May 1999) is an Italian professional footballer who plays as a midfielder for Serie C Group A club Carpi.

== Club career ==
A youth product of Bassano, Zarpellon transferred to Vicenza in the summer of 2018. Zarpellon made his professional debut with Vicenza in a 0–0 Serie C tie with Giana Erminio on 16 September 2018. On 20 September 2020, Zarpellon extended his contract with Vicenza until 2023, and went on a season-long loan to Virtus Verona. On 27 August 2021, he returned to Virtus Verona on another season-long loan.
