= Paolo Maino =

Italian footballer

Personal information
- Date of birth: 2 March 1989 (age 37)
- Place of birth: Como, Italy
- Height: 1.92 m (6 ft 3 1/2 in)
- Position: Defender

Youth career
- –2007: Como
- 2007–2008: AlbinoLeffe

Senior career*
Years	Team	Apps	(Gls)
2008–2012	AlbinoLeffe	11	(0)
2011	→ Barletta (loan)	3	(0)
- * Club domestic league appearances and goals

Paolo Maino (born 2 March 1989) is a former Italian professional football player.

In 2010–11 he changed his shirt number from 55 to no.13.
