= Manuel Daffara =

Italian footballer

Personal information
- Date of birth: 22 June 1989 (age 37)
- Place of birth: Milan, Italy
- Height: 1.81 m (5 ft 11 1/2 in)
- Position: Left-back

Team information
- Current team: Virtus Verona
- Number: 6

Youth career
- Palazzolo
- 2007–2009: AlbinoLeffe

Senior career*
Years	Team	Apps	(Gls)
2008–2013	AlbinoLeffe	14	(0)
2009–2011	→ Pavia (loan)	53	(1)
2012–2013	→ Nocerina (loan)	22	(3)
2013–2014	Perugia	7	(0)
2014	→ Beira-Mar (loan)	12	(0)
2014–2015	Catanzaro	33	(0)
2015–2016	Lupa Roma	20	(2)
2016–2017	Ancona	29	(1)
2017–2019	Siracusa	62	(0)
2019–2020	Padova	2	(0)
2020–	Virtus Verona	208	(4)
- * Club domestic league appearances and goals as of 30 April 2026

Manuel Daffara (born 22 June 1989) is an Italian professional footballer who plays as a left-back for Serie D club Virtus Verona.

== Club career ==
Born in Milan, Lombardy, Daffara started his career at Palazzolo of the Province of Brescia, Lombardy.

=== AlbinoLeffe ===
In August 2007, he signed a youth contract with AlbinoLeffe of Province of Bergamo, Lombardy.

Daffara made his Serie B debut on 18 October 2008, replaced Roberto Previtali in the 68th minute, who received a caution a few minutes before. AlbinoLeffe eventually lost 0–4. He also finished as the losing side of the round 16 of the reserve league, as a forward.

In June 2009, he graduated from AlbinoLeffe's Primavera under-20 team and left for Lega Pro 2nd Divisione side Pavia. He played 23 league matches for the Lombardy side, and fulfill the requirement set by FIGC, which he now eligible to sign a contract of maximum of 5-year instead of 3 year in protection period. Daffara was the starting defender in the promotion playoffs. Despite the club lost 0–2 in aggregate, the club promoted to fill the vacancies.

On 29 July 2010, he signed a new 5-year contract for AlbinoLeffe along with youth products Alessandro Salvi and Enrico Geroni. His loan with Pavia also extended a weeks before.

Daffara returned to AlbinoLeffe for 2011–12 Serie B. He wore no.25 shirt for the first team. The club relegated in 2012.

On 31 August 2012 Daffara was signed by Nocerina of fellow third division. Daffara played both matches in the first round of promotion playoffs. Daffara and Vincenzo Pepe (midfielder) were substitutes for Vincenzo De Liguori (left midfielder) and Marco Chiosa (left-back) in the first game respectively in the 56th minute. in the second match Daffara was the right-back, with De Liguori was on the bench, being replaced by Desiderio Garufo who moved from right-back to right midfielder, as well as Francesco Corapi who moved from right to left midfielder.

=== Perugia ===
On 2 September 2013 he was signed by Perugia outright in 2-year contract. On 28 January 2014 he left for Portuguese club Beira-Mar along with former AlbinoLeffe team-mate Andrea Cocco.

=== Padova ===
On 15 July 2019, he signed with Padova.

=== Virtus Verona ===
On 31 January 2020, he joined Virtus Verona.
