= Virtus Verona =

Italian football club

- Full name: Associazione Virtusvecomp Verona
- Nicknames: Virtussini; Rossoblù (The Red-Blues); I Borgo-Veneziani (The Borgo-Venetians); I Ribelli Veronesi (The Veronan Rebels)
- Founded: 1921; 105 years ago
- Ground: Stadio Gavagnin Nocini, Verona, Italy
- Capacity: 1,200
- Chairman: Luigi Fresco
- Manager: Luigi Fresco
- League: Serie D
- 2025–26: Serie C Group A, 18th of 20 (relegated)
- Website: http://www.virtusverona.it/
Home colours	Away colours	Third colours

Virtus Verona, founded as Unione Sportiva Virtus Borgo Venezia in 1921, sometimes referred to as Virtus Vecomp Verona for sponsorship reasons, is an Italian association football club located in Borgo Venezia, a district of Verona, Veneto. It currently plays in Serie C.

== History ==
The club was founded in 1921 as Unione Sportiva Virtus Borgo Venezia.

Virtus Verona, the third football club in Verona behind Chievo and Hellas Verona, is a unique case in Italy of a club whose chairman, Luigi Fresco, had also been the head coach of the first team for over 41 years, since 1982, after the other historic president Sinibaldo Nocini, who was in charge for 20 years. The club is also notable for being the only Italian professional football team to field a reserve team in the regional amateur divisions.

The club was promoted into professionalism for its first time ever at the end of the 2012–13 season, after winning the national playoff tournament in which they were qualified as fourth-placed in the Girone C of Serie D. At the end of the 2017–18 season, the club return into professionalism, in Serie C, the third tier of Italian football.

== Colours and badge ==
The social colours are red and blue, traditionally arranged in vertical stripes.

The club's historical badge is an ancile red palate, closed externally by a white crown, suitable to contain the social name (sometimes written in abbreviated form).

In 2014 this badge was replaced by a shield, in which the corporate name is simplified in Associazione Virtus Verona: the first and third words are placed in the palate field, while the second (coloured red) is placed in a curved white band placed in a shield.

The badge from 2014 to 2022.

== Current squad ==
As of 6 February 2026

Note: Flags indicate national team as defined under FIFA eligibility rules; some limited exceptions apply. Players may hold more than one non-FIFA nationality.

No.	Pos.	Nation	Player
1	GK	ITA	Riccardo Peroni
2	GK	ITA	Enrico Alfonso
3	DF	ITA	Tommaso Cielo
5	FW	ITA	Federico Fanini
6	DF	ITA	Manuel Daffara
7	MF	ITA	Marco Amadio
8	FW	ITA	Federico Caia (on loan from Hellas Verona)
9	FW	ITA	Michael De Marchi
10	MF	ITA	Leonardo Zarpellon
11	MF	MAR	Hachim Mastour
12	GK	ITA	Nicholas Scardigno (on loan from Sampdoria)
14	MF	ITA	Mattia Di Virgilio
18	FW	ITA	Iacopo Cernigoi
20	MF	ITA	Giammaria Fiorin
21	MF	ITA	Marco Ballarini
22	GK	GAM	Sheikh Sibi
23	MF	ITA	Francesco Toffanin

No.	Pos.	Nation	Player
25	MF	ITA	Nicolò Filippi
27	DF	ITA	Riccardo Passigato Rigotti
28	MF	ITA	Nicola Patanè (on loan from Hellas Verona)
29	DF	ITA	Filippo Saiani (on loan from Virtus Entella)
30	MF	ITA	Christian Gatti
38	DF	ITA	Gianmarco Ingrosso
39	FW	ITA	Tommaso Mancini (on loan from Juventus)
44	FW	ITA	Mattia Pagliuca
47	FW	ITA	Edoardo Cuel
70	MF	ITA	Andrea Devoti
74	FW	ITA	Samuele Lerco
75	MF	ITA	Matteo Bassi
84	MF	SUI	Fabio Iaquinta
95	DF	ITA	Luca Munaretti
97	FW	ITA	Paul Ojeh
99	FW	ITA	Michael Fabbro

=== Out on loan ===
Note: Flags indicate national team as defined under FIFA eligibility rules; some limited exceptions apply. Players may hold more than one non-FIFA nationality.

No.	Pos.	Nation	Player
—	DF	ITA	Riccardo Lodovici (at Ternana until 30 June 2026)
—	MF	ITA	Christian Odogwu (at Vigasio until 30 June 2026)

No.	Pos.	Nation	Player
—	FW	ITA	Giacomo Viviani (at Poggibonsi until 30 June 2026)

== Supporters ==
Virtus Verona supporters are known for their hardline anti-fascist and left-wing leanings. The group Virtus Fans created in 2006, was split up in 2015, from which 2 new groups emerged: Virtus Verona Rude Firm 1921 and the Lost Boys. The Virtus Verona Rude Firm 1921 have friendships with antifa supporters groups all over the world: Livorno Calcio, Cosenza Calcio, Wrexham, Olympique Marseille, FC St. Pauli, RSV Göttingen 05.
