= 2001–02 AC ChievoVerona season =

Chievo
2001–02 season
- President: Luca Campedelli
- Manager: Luigi Delneri
- Stadium: Marcantonio Bentegodi
- Serie A: 5th (in 2002-03 UEFA Cup)
- Coppa Italia: Group stage
- Top goalscorer: League: Marazzina (13); All: Marazzina (13)
- Average home league attendance: 16,061
Home colours	Away colours	Third colours

During the 2001–02 season Chievo Verona competed in Serie A and Coppa Italia.

== Summary ==
The club contested its first ever Serie A campaign in the 2001–02 season. The squad was widely expected to be relegated immediately to Serie B, following a surprising promotion in 2001. Coach Luigi Delneri played a 4–4–2 formation with extremely offensive wingers in the shape of Eriberto and Christian Manfredini. The entire team surpassed expectations, and for six weeks during the autumn Chievo lead serie A. In the end the form dropped off a bit, but Chievo almost qualified for the UEFA Champions League, and thus failed to achieve that sensation. Its players became seriously attractive on the market, but only Manfredini and target man Bernardo Corradi actually left the club, both joining Lazio prior to the 2002–03 season.

== Squad ==
Note: Flags indicate national team as defined under FIFA eligibility rules; some limited exceptions apply. Players may hold more than one non-FIFA nationality.

No.	Pos.	Nation	Player
67	GK	ITA	Marco Ambrosio
1	GK	ITA	Gioacchino Cavaliere
—	GK	YUG	Vojislav Dragović
10	GK	ITA	Cristiano Lupatelli
4	DF	BRA	Claiton
6	DF	ITA	Maurizio D'Angelo
94	DF	ITA	Lorenzo D'Anna
18	DF	ITA	Paolo Foglio
13	DF	ITA	Enrico Franchi
—	DF	FRA	Patrice Grillon
23	DF	ITA	Salvatore Lanna
66	DF	ITA	Nicola Legrottaglie
21	DF	ITA	Moreno Longo
17	DF	AUS	Matthew Engele
25	DF	ITA	Stefano Lorenzi
27	DF	ITA	Fabio Moro
—	DF	ITA	Luca Mezzano
14	DF	NGA	Daniel Ola

No.	Pos.	Nation	Player
32	DF	ITA	Alessandro Rinaldi
7	MF	ITA	Simone Barone
8	MF	ITA	Jonathan Binotto
5	MF	ITA	Eugenio Corini
8	MF	ITA	Massimiliano Esposito
29	MF	ITA	Fabio Firmani
19	MF	ITA	Daniele Franceschini
—	MF	ITA	Giorgio Gorgone
15	MF	BRA	Eriberto
16	MF	CIV	Christian Manfredini
20	MF	ITA	Simone Perrotta
75	MF	ITA	Andrea Zanchetta
33	FW	ITA	Luigi Beghetto
9	FW	ITA	Bernardo Corradi
24	FW	ITA	Federico Cossato
11	FW	ITA	Massimo Marazzina
30	FW	COD	Jason Mayélé

=== Transfers ===
In
Pos.	Name	from	Type
GK	Cristiano Lupatelli	A.S. Roma	loan
GK	Marco Ambrosio	Lucchese	
GK	Gioacchino Cavaliere	Ascoli	
DF	Daniel Ola	S.S. Lazio	loan
DF	Luca Mezzano	Reggina Calcio	loan ended
DF	Paolo Foglio	Venezia	co-ownership
DF	Stefano Lorenzi	Atalanta B.C.	
DF	Nicola Legrottaglie	Modena	loan ended
DF	Cleiton	Fiorentina	
MF	Simone Perrotta	A.S. Bari	
MF	Jonatan Binotto	Inter	
FW	Luigi Beghetto	Cagliari Calcio	
FW	Massimo Marazzina	Reggina Calcio	loan ended

Out
Pos.	Name	To	Type
GK	Sergio Marcon	Ternana Calcio	
GK	Giorgio Frezzolini	Inter	loan ended
DF	Ivan Franceschini	Reggina Calcio	loan ended
DF	Andrea Guerra	Palermo F.C.	
MF	Dario Passoni	A.C. Siena	loan
MF	Andrea Zanchetta	Vicenza Calcio	loan
MF	Giorgio Gorgone	Cagliari Calcio	
FW	Raffaele Cerbone	S.P.A.L.	
FW	Ciro De Cesare	A.C. Siena	
FW	Enrico Fantini	Venezia F.C.	loan ended

==== Winter ====
In
Pos.	Name	from	Type
MF	Massimiliano Esposito	Brescia Calcio	loan
FW	Jason Mayélé	Cagliari Calcio	loan

Out
Pos.	Name	To	Type
GK	Gioacchino Cavaliere		
DF	Claiton	Bologna F.C.	
DF	Paolo Foglio	Atalanta B.C.	
MF	Jonathan Binotto	Brescia Calcio	
MF	Fabio Firmani	Bologna F.C.	
MF	Andrea Zanchetta	Vicenza Calcio	loan

== Competitions ==
=== Serie A ===
Pos	Team	Pld	W	D	L	GF	GA	GD	Pts	Qualification or relegation
3	Internazionale	34	20	9	5	62	35	+27	69	Qualification to Champions League third qualifying round
4	Milan	34	14	13	7	47	33	+14	55	Qualification to Champions League third qualifying round
5	Chievo	34	14	12	8	57	52	+5	54	Qualification to UEFA Cup first round
6	Lazio	34	14	11	9	50	37	+13	53	Qualification to UEFA Cup first round
7	Bologna	34	15	7	12	40	40	0	52	Qualification to Intertoto Cup third round

Source: 2001–02 Serie A, Soccerway
Rules for classification: 1) Points; 2) Head-to-head points; 3) Head-to-head goal difference; 4) Goal difference; 5) Goals scored; 6) Draw. (Note: Head-to-head record is used only after all the matches between the teams in question have been played).

==== Results by round ====
Round	1	2	3	4	5	6	7	8	9	10	11	12	13	14	15	16	17	18	19	20	21	22	23	24	25	26	27	28	29	30	31	32	33	34
Ground	A	H	A	H	A	A	H	H	A	A	H	A	H	A	H	H	A	H	A	H	H	A	H	A	H	A	A	A	H	H	A	H	A	H
Result	W	W	L	W	W	D	W	W	D	L	W	L	W	W	L	W	D	L	L	W	D	L	D	D	D	D	D	W	D	D	W	D	L	W
Position	1	1	4	4	2	2	1	1	1	1	1	2	2	1	3	3	3	4	4	4	4	4	5	5	5	5	5	5	6	6	4	4	6	5

Source: Competitive matches
A = Away; H = Home; W = Win; D = Draw; L = Loss; = Leader, 2002–03 UEFA Champions League Group stage; = 2002–03 UEFA Champions League Group stage; = 2002–03 UEFA Champions League Second qualifying round; = 2002–03 UEFA Cup First round; = 2002 UEFA Intertoto Cup Third round

==== Matches ====
26 August 2001 1	Fiorentina	0–2	Chievo	Florence
		Report	Perrotta 5'; Marazzina 53'	Stadium: Stadio Artemio Franchi; Attendance: 15,050; Referee: Marco Gabriele

9 September 2001 2	Chievo	2–0	Bologna	Verona
		Report	Corradi 13'; Cossato 85'	Stadium: Stadio Marc'Antonio Bentegodi; Attendance: 9,852; Referee: Alfredo Trentalange

15 September 2001 3	Juventus	3–2	Chievo	Turin
	Tacchinardi 22'; Tudor 40'; Salas 83' (pen.)	Report	Marazzina 9', 20'	Stadium: Stadio Delle Alpi; Attendance: 40,555; Referee: Cosimo Bolognino

23 September 2001 4	Chievo	4–2	Piacenza	Verona
	Corini 14' (pen.), 68'; Manfredini 37'; Perrotta 47'	Report	Hübner 8', 87'	Stadium: Stadio Marc'Antonio Bentegodi; Attendance: 6,393; Referee: Marco Gabriele

30 September 2001 5	Udinese	1–2	Chievo	Udine
	Caballero 38'	Report	Perrotta 20'; Eriberto 23'	Stadium: Stadio Friuli; Attendance: 13,153; Referee: Emilio Pellegrino

14 October 2001 7	Brescia	2–2	Chievo	Brescia
	Baggio 61' (pen.); Sussi 83'	Report	Marazzina 11'; Cossato 77'	Stadium: Stadio Mario Rigamonti; Attendance: 15,447; Referee: Daniele Tombolini

21 October 2001 8	Chievo	1–0	Parma	Verona
	Corradi 24'	Report		Stadium: Stadio Marc'Antonio Bentegodi; Attendance: 12,854; Referee: Stefano Braschi

28 October 2001 9	Chievo	3–0	Torino	Verona
	Marazzina 31'; Manfredini 50'; Eriberto 82'	Report		Stadium: Stadio Marc'Antonio Bentegodi; Attendance: 16,521; Referee: Pierluigi Collina

3 November 2001 10	Venezia	0–0	Chievo	Venice
		Report		Stadium: Stadio Pier Luigi Penzo; Attendance: 10,755; Referee: Roberto Rosetti

18 November 2001 11	Verona	3–2	Chievo	Verona
	Oddo 40' (pen.); Lanna 70' (o.g.); Camoranesi 73'	Report	Eriberto 33'; Corini 37' (pen.)	Stadium: Stadio Marc'Antonio Bentegodi; Attendance: 38,356; Referee: Alfredo Trentalange

25 November 2001 12	Chievo	2–0	Perugia	Verona
	Corini 27' (pen.); D'Anna 77'	Report		Stadium: Stadio Marc'Antonio Bentegodi; Attendance: 8,938; Referee: Stefano Braschi

2 December 2001 13	Milan	3–2	Chievo	Milan
	Inzaghi 15'; Shevchenko 57' (pen.), 65'	Report	Marazzina 26'; Corradi 29'	Stadium: Stadio Giuseppe Meazza; Attendance: 60,265; Referee: Graziano Cesari

9 December 2001 14	Chievo	2–1	Lecce	Verona
	Marazzina 22'; Corini 77' (pen.)	Report	Cimirotič 52'	Stadium: Stadio Marc'Antonio Bentegodi; Attendance: 8,725; Referee: Domenico Messina

15 December 2001 15	Inter	1–2	Chievo	Milan
	Vieri 25'	Report	Corradi 20'; Marazzina 54'	Stadium: Stadio Giuseppe Meazza; Attendance: 63,485; Referee: Roberto Rosetti

22 December 2001 16	Chievo	0–3	Roma	Verona
		Report	Emerson 26'; Samuel 76'; Tommasi 90'	Stadium: Stadio Marc'Antonio Bentegodi; Attendance: 16,747; Referee: Graziano Cesari

6 January 2002 17	Atalanta	1–2	Chievo	Bergamo
	Berretta 5'	Report	Marazzina 60'; Cossato 77'	Stadium: Stadio Atleti Azzurri d'Italia; Attendance: 16,633; Referee: Emilio Pellegrino

13 January 2002 18	Chievo	2–2	Fiorentina	Florence
	Eugenio Corini 46' (pen.); Lorenzo D'Anna 86'		Nuno Gomes 12'; Adriano 89'	Stadium: Stadio Artemio Franchi

20 January 2002 19	Bologna	3–1	Chievo	Bologna
	Lamberto Zauli 40'; Julio Cruz 70'; Lamberto Zauli 90'	Report	Luigi Beghetto 73'	Stadium: Stadio Renato Dall'Ara

27 January 2002 20	Chievo	1–3	Juventus	Verona
	Massimo Marazzina 59'	Report	Ciro Ferrara 17'; Fabio Moro 47' (o.g.); Alessandro Del Piero 70' (pen.)	Stadium: Stadio Marc'Antonio Bentegodi

30 January 2002 6	Chievo	3–1	Lazio	Verona
	Marazzina 46'; Corini 78', 88' (pen.)	Report	López 7'	Stadium: Stadio Marc'Antonio Bentegodi; Attendance: 10,999; Referee: Pierluigi Collina
Note: Match rescheduled from 19 December 2001 due to bad field conditions.

3 February 2002 21	Piacenza	2–2	Chievo	Piacenza
	Dario Hübner 45' (pen.); Eusebio Di Francesco 62'	Report	Massimo Marazzina 31'; Federico Cossato 83'	Stadium: Garilli

9 February 2002 22	Chievo	1–2	Udinese	Verona
	Federico Cossato 89'	Report	Per Krøldrup 17'; Roberto Muzzi 68'	Stadium: Stadio Marc'Antonio Bentegodi

17 February 2002 23	Lazio	1–1	Chievo	Rome
	Simone Inzaghi 31'; (penalty missed) '66 Hernan Crespo	Report	Nicola Legrottaglie 85'	Stadium: Olimpico

24 February 2002 24	Chievo	1–1	Brescia	Verona
	Bernardo Corradi 42'	Report	Luca Toni 80'	Stadium: Stadio Marc'Antonio Bentegodi

10 March 2002 26	Torino	2–2	Chievo	Turin
	Marco Ferrante 35'; Riccardo Maspero 59'	Report	Bernardo Corradi 20'; Bernardo Corradi 53'	Stadium: Delle Alpi

13 March 2002 25	Parma	0–0	Chievo	Parma
		Report		Stadium: Il Tardini
Note: Match rescheduled from 3 March 2002 due to the death of Chievo' player Jason Mayélé in a car accident on 2 March 2002.

17 March 2002 27	Chievo	1–1	Venezia	Verona
	Eugenio Corini 63' (pen.)	Report	Arturo Di Napoli 5'	Stadium: Stadio Marc'Antonio Bentegodi

24 March 2002 28	Chievo	2–1	Verona	Verona
	Federico Cossato 42': 2–1 Federico Cossato 74'	Report	Adrian Mutu 12'	Stadium: Stadio Marc'Antonio Bentegodi

30 March 2002 29	Perugia	2–2	Chievo	Perugia
	Mauro Milanese 68'; Fabio Bazzani 34'	Report	Bernardo Corradi 22'; Bernardo Corradi 49'

7 April 2002 30	Chievo	1–1	Milan	Verona
	Moro 22'	Report	13' Inzaghi	Stadium: Stadio Marc'Antonio Bentegodi

14 April 2002 31	Lecce	2–3	Chievo	Lecco
	Chevanton 26'; Chevanton 39'	Report	16' Legrottaglie; 73'Perrotta; 79'Eriberto	Stadium: Stadio Via del Mare

21 April 2002 32	Chievo	2–2	Inter	Verona
	Marazzina 41'; Cossato 90'	Report	46' Dalmat; 60' Ronaldo	Stadium: Stadio Marc'Antonio Bentegodi

28 April 2002 33	Roma	5–0	Chievo	Rome
	Montella 25'; Montella 34'; Montella 51' (pen.); Emerson 74'; Cassano 82'	Report		Stadium: Olimpico

5 May 2002 34	Chievo	2–1	Atalanta	Verona
	Corradi 58'; Cossato 75'	Report	53' Rossini	Stadium: Stadio Marc'Antonio Bentegodi

=== Coppa Italia ===
==== Group stage ====
Pos	Team	Pld	W	D	L	GF	GA	GD	Pts
1	Ternana (B)	3	2	1	0	6	2	+4	7
2	Chievo (A)	3	2	1	0	4	2	+2	7
3	Prato (C2)	3	1	0	2	3	5	−2	3
4	Pistoiese (B)	3	0	0	3	4	8	−4	0

===== Matches =====
12 August 2001	Pistoiese	1–2	Chievo	Pistoia
	Baiano 43'		24' (pen.) Corini; 69' Perrotta	Stadium: Comunale; Referee: Collina

19 August 2001	Chievo	1–0	A.C. Prato	Verona
	Corini 61'			Stadium: Stadio Marcantonio Bentegodi; Referee: Rizzoli

29 August 2001	Ternana Calcio	1–1	Chievo	Terni
	Borgobello 18' (pen.)		24' Cossato	Stadium: Stadio Libero Liberati; Referee: Saccani

== Statistics ==
=== Squad statistics ===
Competition	Points	Home						Away						Total						GD
Competition	Points	G	W	D	L	Gf	Ga	G	W	D	L	Gf	Ga	G	W	D	L	Gf	Ga	GD
2001-02 Serie A	54	17	9	5	3	30	21	17	5	7	5	27	31	34	14	12	8	57	52	+5
2001-02 Coppa Italia		1	1	0	0	1	0	2	1	1	0	3	2	3	2	1	0	4	2	+2
Total		18	10	5	3	31	21	19	6	8	5	30	33	37	16	13	8	61	54	+7

=== Players statistics ===
No.	Pos	Nat	Player	Total		Serie A		Coppa Italia	
No.	Pos	Nat	Player	Apps	Goals	Apps	Goals	Apps	Goals
10	GK	(Italy) ITA	Lupatelli	35	-53	33	-52	2	-1
6	DF	(Italy) ITA	D'Angelo	29	0	28	0	1	0
94	DF	(Italy) ITA	D'Anna	32	2	28+1	2	3	0
23	DF	(Italy) ITA	Lanna	36	0	31+2	0	3	0
27	DF	(Italy) ITA	Moro	32	1	30	1	2	0
16	MF	(Ivory Coast) CIV	Manfredini	31	2	27+1	2	3	0
20	MF	(Italy) ITA	Perrotta	35	5	31+1	4	3	1
5	MF	(Italy) ITA	Corini	32	11	30	9	2	2
15	MF	(Brazil) BRA	Eriberto	32	4	30	4	2	0
9	FW	(Italy) ITA	Corradi	35	10	31+1	10	3	0
11	FW	(Italy) ITA	Marazzina	32	13	30+1	13	1	0
67	GK	(Italy) ITA	Ambrosio	3	-1	1+1	0	1	-1
66	DF	(Italy) ITA	Legrottaglie	15	2	13	2	2	0
24	FW	(Italy) ITA	Cossato	34	10	7+25	9	2	1
19	MF	(Italy) ITA	Franceschini	22	0	7+12	0	3	0
7	MF	(Italy) ITA	Barone	18	0	6+10	0	2	0
25	DF	(Italy) ITA	Lorenzi	13	0	4+9	0		
8	MF	(Italy) ITA	Esposito	9	0	2+7	0		
8	MF	(Italy) ITA	Binotto	5	0	2+3	0		
18	DF	(Italy) ITA	Foglio	5	0	2	0	3	0
29	MF	(Italy) ITA	Firmani	1	0	1	0		
33	FW	(Italy) ITA	Beghetto	10	1	0+10	1		
30	FW	(Democratic Republic of the Congo) COD	Mayele	10	0	0+10	0		
90	FW	(Italy) ITA	De Cesare	5	0	0+3	0	2	0
32	DF	(Italy) ITA	Rinaldi	2	0	0+2	0		
75	MF	(Italy) ITA	Zanchetta	3	0	0+2	0	1	0
1	GK	(Italy) ITA	Cavaliere	0	0	0	0		
29	DF	(France) FRA	Grillon	0	0	0	0		
21	DF	(Italy) ITA	Moreno Longo	0	0	0	0		
18	FW	(Italy) ITA	De Paula	0	0	0	0		
28	DF	(Italy) ITA	Quintavalla	0	0	0	0		
90	FW	(Uruguay) URU	Silva	0	0	0	0		
	FW	(Senegal) SEN	Kamara	1	0	0	0	1	0

- Source: http://calcio-seriea.net/partite/2001/1201/

== Sources ==
RSSF – Italian Football 2001–02
