= 2002–03 AC ChievoVerona season =

Chievo
2002–03 season
- Chairman: Luca Campedelli
- Manager: Luigi Delneri
- Serie A: 7th
- Coppa Italia: Quarter-finals
- UEFA Cup: First round
- Top goalscorer: Federico Cossato (9)

A.C. ChievoVerona played its second consecutive season in Serie A, and nearly equaled 5th place from the 2001-02 Serie A season. The club's second season in the premier division was played without Christian Manfredini and Bernardo Corradi, both ending up with Lazio. Due to passport troubles, it also lost key winger Eriberto, who turned out to be four years older and called Luciano, but had faked his identity since he was 21, in order to participate in a Brazilian youth team.

Despite the squad being thinned out, several key players, including Nicola Legrottaglie, Eugenio Corini and Simone Perrotta remained at the club, and those three proved to be the most important players for Chievo, since the absence of the previous starts hardly mattered in terms of results. In the end, only negative results against Udinese hindered Chievo from a second consecutive UEFA Cup qualification. Its European debut ended in a flop, though, as it lost to unfancied Serbian side Crvena Zvezda in the primary round.

== Squad ==
=== Goalkeepers ===
- (Italy) Cristiano Lupatelli
- (Italy) Marco Ambrosio

=== Defenders ===
- (Italy) Salvatore Lanna
- (Italy) Nicola Legrottaglie
- (Italy) Fabio Moro
- (Italy) Lorenzo D'Anna
- (Ghana) John Mensah
- (Italy) Stefano Lorenzi
- (Italy) Emanuele Pesaresi
- (Italy) Gianluca Grassadonia
- (Italy) Maurizio D'Angelo
- (Mexico) Alejandro Ricavar

=== Midfielders ===
- (Italy) Daniele Franceschini
- (Italy) Simone Perrotta
- (Italy) Eugenio Corini
- (Italy) Ivano Della Morte
- (Brazil) Luciano
- (Sweden) Daniel Andersson
- (Serbia and Montenegro) Nikola Lazetić
- (France) Lilian Nalis
- (Italy) Dario Passoni
- (Italy) Ivone De Franceschi

=== Attackers ===
- (Italy) Federico Cossato
- (Germany) Oliver Bierhoff
- (Italy) Sergio Pellissier
- (Italy) Massimo Marazzina
- (Croatia) Saša Bjelanović
- (Italy) Luigi Beghetto
- (Brazil) de Paula

== Serie A ==
Pos	Team	Pld	W	D	L	GF	GA	GD	Pts	Qualification or relegation
5	Parma	34	15	11	8	55	36	+19	56 (Note: Parma finished ahead of Udinese on head-to-head points: Udinese 1–1 Parma, Parma 3–2 Udinese.)	Qualification to UEFA Cup first round
6	Udinese	34	16	8	10	38	35	+3	56	Qualification to UEFA Cup first round
7	Chievo	34	16	7	11	51	39	+12	55	
8	Roma (Note: Roma qualified for the first round of the 2003-04 UEFA Cup as Coppa Italia runner-up because the winner, Milan, qualified for Champions League through championship position.)	34	13	10	11	55	46	+9	49	Qualification to UEFA Cup first round
9	Brescia	34	9	15	10	36	38	−2	42 (Note: Brescia finished ahead of Perugia on head-to-head points: Brescia 3–1 Perugia, Perugia 0–0 Brescia.)	Qualification to Intertoto Cup second round

Source: 2002–03 Serie A, Soccerway
Rules for classification: 1) Points; 2) Head-to-head points; 3) Head-to-head goal difference; 4) Goal difference; 5) Goals scored; 6) Draw. (Note: Head-to-head record is used only after all the matches between the teams in question have been played).

=== Matches ===
- Lazio-Chievo 2-3
- 1-0 Diego Simeone (5)
- 1-1 Lorenzo D'Anna (14)
- 1-2 Oliver Bierhoff (49)
- 2-2 Bernardo Corradi (64)
- 2-3 Ivano Della Morte (70)
- Chievo-Brescia 1-2
- 0-1 Igli Tare (12)
- 1-1 Federico Cossato (29)
- 1-2 Anthony Šerić (87)
- Internazionale-Chievo 2-1
- 0-1 Massimo Marazzina (3)
- 1-1 Christian Vieri (15)
- 2-1 Christian Vieri (78 pen)
- Chievo-Modena 2-0
- 1-0 Daniele Franceschini (32)
- 2-0 Eugenio Corini (47 pen)
- Torino-Chievo 1-0
- 1-0 Federico Magallanes (18)
- Chievo-Milan 3-2
- 1-0 Massimo Marazzina (22)
- 2-0 Oliver Bierhoff (49)
- 2-1 Andriy Shevchenko (59)
- 3-1 Federico Cossato (83)
- 3-2 Jon Dahl Tomasson (90 + 4)
- Parma-Chievo 0-1
- 0-1 Sergio Pellissier (90 + 4)
- Chievo-Perugia 3-0
- 1-0 Nicola Legrottaglie (25)
- 2-0 Ivano Della Morte (28)
- 3-0 Eugenio Corini (52 pen)
- Chievo-Atalanta 4-1
- 0-1 Luigi Sala (40)
- 1-1 Federico Cossato (45)
- 2-1 Daniele Franceschini (56)
- 3-1 Simone Perrotta (84)
- 4-1 Federico Cossato (87)
- Udinese-Chievo 2-1
- 1-0 Martin Jørgensen (13)
- 2-0 Carsten Jancker (27)
- 2-1 Oliver Bierhoff (48)
- Chievo-Empoli 1-0
- 1-0 Massimo Marazzina (27)
- Reggina-Chievo 1-1
- 1-0 Shunsuke Nakamura (23 pen)
- 1-1 Nicola Legrottaglie (49)
- Chievo-Bologna 0-0
- Piacenza-Chievo 0-3
- 0-1 Ivano Della Morte (49)
- 0-2 Oliver Bierhoff (87)
- 0-3 Sergio Pellissier (90 + 1)
- Chievo-Como 2-0
- 1-0 Nicola Legrottaglie (64)
- 2-0 Sergio Pellissier (73)
- Roma-Chievo 0-1
- 0-1 Federico Cossato (89)
- Chievo-Juventus 1-4
- 0-1 David Trezeguet (11)
- 0-2 Alessandro Del Piero (21 pen)
- 0-3 David Trezeguet (23)
- 1-3 Federico Cossato (72)
- 1-4 David Trezeguet (86 pen)
- Perugia-Chievo 1-0
- 1-0 Marco Di Loreto (37)
- Chievo-Lazio 1-1
- 1-0 Eugenio Corini (45 pen)
- 1-1 Diego Simeone (89)
- Brescia-Chievo 0-0
- Chievo-Internazionale 2-1
- 1-0 Eugenio Corini (22 pen)
- 2-0 Eugenio Corini (36 pen)
- 2-1 Christian Vieri (69)
- Modena-Chievo 1-0
- 1-0 Giuseppe Sculli (76)
- Chievo-Torino 3-2
- 0-1 Vincenzo Sommense (16)
- 1-1 Sergio Pellissier (30)
- 1-2 Massimo Donati (39)
- 2-2 Federico Cossato (59)
- 3-2 Lorenzo D'Anna (63)
- Milan-Chievo 0-0
- Chievo-Parma 0-4
- 0-1 Adrian Mutu (6)
- 0-2 Hidetoshi Nakata (59)
- 0-3 Sabri Lamouchi (67)
- 0-4 Alberto Gilardino (90 + 1)
- Atalanta-Chievo 1-0
- 1-0 Ousmane Dabo (52)
- Chievo-Udinese 3-0
- 1-0 Saša Bjelanović (10)
- 2-0 Federico Cossato (37)
- 3-0 Sergio Pellissier (68)
- Empoli-Chievo 2-1
- 0-1 Saša Bjelanović (8)
- 1-1 Antonio Buscè (23)
- 2-1 Stefano Lucchini (61)
- Chievo-Reggina 2-1
- 1-0 Federico Cossato (24)
- 1-1 Federico Cossato (42 og)
- 2-1 Nicola Legrottaglie (73)
- Bologna-Chievo 1-1
- 1-0 Giuseppe Signori (2)
- 1-1 Ivano Della Morte (90 + 4)
- Chievo-Piacenza 3-1
- 0-1 Eusebio Di Francesco (5)
- 1-1 Ivone De Franceschi (65)
- 2-1 Ivone De Franceschi (69)
- 3-1 Saša Bjelanović (80)
- Como-Chievo 2-4
- 0-1 Daniele Franceschini (10)
- 0-2 Luciano (21)
- 0-3 Daniele Franceschini (41)
- 0-4 Saša Bjelanović (48)
- 1-4 Nicola Amoruso (52)
- 2-4 Nicola Caccia (73)
- Chievo-Roma 0-0
- Juventus-Chievo 4-3
- 1-0 Marcelo Zalayeta (16)
- 2-0 Marcelo Zalayeta (57)
- 2-1 Oliver Bierhoff (62)
- 3-1 David Trezeguet (70)
- 3-2 Oliver Bierhoff (74)
- 3-3 Oliver Bierhoff (79)
- 4-3 Cristian Zenoni (87)

=== Topscorers ===
- (Italy) Federico Cossato 9
- (Germany) Oliver Bierhoff 7
- (Italy) Eugenio Corini 5
- (Italy) Sergio Pellissier 5
- (Croatia) Saša Bjelanović 4
- (Italy) Daniele Franceschini 4
- (Italy) Nicola Legrottaglie 4
- (Italy) Ivano Della Morte 4

== Sources ==
- RSSSF - Italy 2002/03
