= Derby della Scala =

ChievoVerona–Hellas Verona football derby in Italy

- Other names: Verona Derby, Derby dell'Arena
- Location: Verona, Italy
- Teams: Hellas Verona; Chievo
- First meeting: Hellas Verona 1–1 Chievo; Serie B (10 December 1994)
- Latest meeting: Hellas Verona 1–0 Chievo; Serie A (10 March 2018)
- Stadiums: Stadio Marc'Antonio Bentegodi

Statistics
- Total meetings: 19
- Most wins: Tied (7 each)
- Most player appearances: Lorenzo D'Anna (9)
- Top scorer: Sergio Pellissier (4)
- Largest victory: Hellas Verona 4–0 Chievo; Serie B (11 October 1996)

The Derby della Scala, also known as Derby dell'Arena or the Verona Derby in English and Derby di Verona in Italian, is the name given to any association football match contested between ChievoVerona and Hellas Verona. Its venue is at the Stadio Marc'Antonio Bentegodi. The name refers to the Scaligeri or della Scala aristocratic family, who were rulers of Verona during the Middle Ages and early Renaissance.

The city of Verona became so the 5th city in Italy, after Milan, Rome, Turin and Genoa to host a derby in Serie A. All five derbies were contested in the 2013–14 season and have been repeated in three later campaigns to date (2014–15, 2015–16, 2017–18).

== History ==
Hellas, founded in 1903, were traditionally the main club in Verona. Chievo, founded in 1929, historically represented the small Verona suburb of the same name, using a small parish field as their home ground, and did not become a professional side until 1986. At that time, Chievo became tenants of Hellas at the Bentegodi, and began rising up the league ladder. By the mid-1990s, Chievo had joined Hellas in Serie B, creating the derby. During the teams' early Serie B meetings, Hellas supporters taunted Chievo with the chant Quando i mussi volara, il Ceo in Serie A – "Donkeys will fly before Chievo are in Serie A." Once Chievo earned promotion to Serie A at the end of the 2000–01 season, their fans started calling the team i Mussi Volanti (The Flying Donkeys). A 2014 story in the British football magazine Late Tackle remarked that "Hellas fans didn't so much have their words rammed down their throat as forced through every orifice with a barge pole."

In the 2001–02 season, both Hellas and Chievo were playing in Serie A. The first ever derby of Verona in Serie A took place on 18 November 2001, while both teams were ranked among the top four. The match was won by Hellas, 3–2. Chievo got revenge in the return match in spring 2002, winning 2–1.

== Results ==
Dates are in dd/mm/yyyy form.

=== League matches ===
Chievo win Draw Hellas Verona win

		Hellas Verona vs Chievo			Chievo vs Hellas Verona		
Season	Division	Date	Venue	Score	Date	Venue	Score
1994–95	Serie B	10.12.1994	Stadio Marc'Antonio Bentegodi	1 – 1	07.05.1995	Stadio Marc'Antonio Bentegodi	3 – 1
1995–96	Serie B	28.04.1996	Stadio Marc'Antonio Bentegodi	1 – 0	25.11.1996	Stadio Marc'Antonio Bentegodi	1 – 2
1996–97	Serie B	11.10.1996	Stadio Marc'Antonio Bentegodi	4 – 0	14.03.1997	Stadio Marc'Antonio Bentegodi	2 – 0
1998–99	Serie B	19.12.1998	Stadio Marc'Antonio Bentegodi	0 – 0	16.05.1999	Stadio Marc'Antonio Bentegodi	2 – 0
2001–02	Serie A	18.11.2001	Stadio Marc'Antonio Bentegodi	3 – 2	24.03.2002	Stadio Marc'Antonio Bentegodi	2 – 1
2013–14	Serie A	23.11.2013	Stadio Marc'Antonio Bentegodi	0 – 1	06.04.2014	Stadio Marc'Antonio Bentegodi	0 – 1
2014–15	Serie A	21.12.2014	Stadio Marc'Antonio Bentegodi	0 – 1	10.05.2015	Stadio Marc'Antonio Bentegodi	2 – 2
2015–16	Serie A	20.02.2016	Stadio Marc'Antonio Bentegodi	3 – 1	03.10.2015	Stadio Marc'Antonio Bentegodi	1 – 1
2017–18	Serie A	10.03.2018	Stadio Marc'Antonio Bentegodi	1 – 0	22.10.2017	Stadio Marc'Antonio Bentegodi	3 – 2

=== Cup matches ===
Season	Competition	Round	Date	Stadium	Home team	Result	Away team
2017–18	Coppa Italia	Fourth round	29.11.2017	Stadio Marc'Antonio Bentegodi	Chievo	1 – 1 ^{1}	Hellas Verona

^{1} 2017–18 Coppa Italia fourth round match won 5–4 on penalties by Hellas Verona.

== Statistics ==
Updated 10 March 2018

Competition	Played	Chievo wins	Draws	Hellas Verona wins
Serie A	10	4	2	4
Serie B	8	3	2	3
Coppa Italia	1	0	1	0
Total	19	7	5	7

=== Most appearances (players) ===
Player	Appearances (Club(s))
(Italy) Lorenzo D'Anna	9 (Chievo)
(Italy) Maurizio D'Angelo	7 (Chievo)
(Italy) Alessandro Manetti	6 (Hellas Verona)
(Italy) Dario Dainelli	6 (1 Hellas Verona, 5 Chievo)
(Italy) Luca Toni	5 (Hellas Verona)
(Italy) Antonio De Vitis	5 (Hellas Verona)
(Italy) Eugenio Corini	5 (2 Hellas Verona, 3 Chievo)
(Italy) Michele Cossato	5 (4 Chievo, 1 Hellas Verona)
(Italy) Enrico Franchi	5 (Chievo)
(Italy) Andrea Guerra	5 (Chievo)

=== Most appearances (coaches) ===
Coach	Appearances (Club(s))
(Italy) Rolando Maran	7 (Chievo)
(Italy) Alberto Malesani	6 (4 Chievo, 2 Hellas Verona)
(Italy) Andrea Mandorlini	5 (Hellas Verona)
(Italy) Luigi Delneri	3 (2 Chievo, 1 Hellas Verona)
(Italy) Fabio Pecchia	3 (Hellas Verona)^{1}
(Italy) Bortolo Mutti	2 (Hellas Verona)
(Italy) Attilio Perotti	2 (Hellas Verona)
(Italy) Silvio Baldini	2 (Chievo)
(Italy) Luigi Cagni	2 (Hellas Verona)
(Italy) Lorenzo Balestro	2 (Chievo)
(Italy) Cesare Prandelli	2 (Hellas Verona)
(Italy) Eugenio Corini	2 (Chievo)

Pecchia and Maran appeared also in the 2017–18 Coppa Italia Fourth Round match

=== Goalscorers ===
Player	Club(s)	Serie A	Serie B	Coppa Italia	Total
(Italy) Sergio Pellissier	Chievo	3	0	1	4
(Italy) Luca Toni	Hellas Verona	3	0	0	3
(Italy) Federico Cossato	Chievo	2	1	0	3
(Italy) Alberto Paloschi	Chievo	2	0	0	2
(Italy) Eugenio Corini	Hellas Verona; Chievo	1	1	0	2
(Italy) Fabrizio Cammarata	Hellas Verona	0	2	0	2
(Italy) Michele Cossato	Chievo	0	2	0	2
(Italy) Roberto Inglese	Chievo	2	0	0	2

=== Players who played for both clubs ===
The following players have played for both Chievo and Verona:

- (Italy) Elvis Abbruscato
- (Italy) Alfredo Aglietti
- (Italy) Jonathan Binotto
- (Croatia) Saša Bjelanović
- (Albania) Erjon Bogdani
- (Italy) Simone Bonomi
- (Italy) Davide Brivio
- (Italy) Andrea Burato
- (Italy) Fabrizio Cacciatore
- (Italy) Nicola Ciccolo
- (Italy) Giuseppe Colucci
- (Italy) Eugenio Corini
- (Italy) Michele Cossato
- (Italy) Dario Dainelli
- (Italy) Fabio Depaoli
- (Italy) Antonio Di Gaudio
- (Ghana) Caleb Ekuban
- (Italy) Massimiliano Esposito
- (Montenegro) Ivan Fatić
- (Italy) Flavio Fiorio
- (Italy) Paolo Foglio
- (Italy) Alessandro Gamberini
- (Italy) Stefano Garzon
- (Italy) Stefano Ghirardello
- (Italy) Matteo Gianello
- (Italy) Tiberio Guarente
- (Italy) Andrea Guerra
- (Italy) Vincenzo Italiano
- (Italy) Antimo Iunco
- (Italy) Luigi Martinelli
- (Italy) Martino Melis
- (Italy) Luca Mezzano
- (Italy) Leonardo Moracci
- (Italy) Matteo Pivotto
- (Italy) Nico Pulzetti
- (Italy) Alessandro Rinaldi
- (Italy) Matteo Rubin
- (Italy) Marco Silvestri
- (Poland) Mariusz Stępiński
- (Italy) Luciano Venturini
- (Italy) Marco Zamboni
- (Italy) Marco Zanchi
