= Andrea Zanchetta =

Italian footballer (born 1975)

Personal information
- Date of birth: 2 February 1975 (age 51)
- Place of birth: Gaglianico, Italy
- Height: 1.80 m (5 ft 11 in)
- Positions: Right midfielder; attacking midfielder

Team information
- Current team: Pianese (head coach)

Youth career
- Inter Milan

Senior career*
Years	Team	Apps	(Gls)
1994–1995	Inter Milan	2	(0)
1995–1997	Foggia	57	(7)
1997–2007	Chievo	170	(20)
2000–2001	→ Reggina (loan)	24	(5)
2001–2003	→ Vicenza (loan)	56	(6)
2007–2009	Lecce	76	(9)
2009–2011	Cremonese	34	(6)

Managerial career
- 2025: Novara
- 2026–: Pianese
- * Club domestic league appearances and goals

Andrea Zanchetta (born 2 February 1975) is an Italian football coach and a former player. He is the head coach of Serie C Group B club Pianese.

== Club career ==
=== Inter Milan ===
Born in Gaglianico, Piedmont, Zanchetta started his professional career at Inter Milan. After working his way through the club's youth ranks, he made his first team debut in the Italian Serie A on 23 October 1994 against Foggia. That season, he played twice for Inter, both against Foggia.

Ahead of the 1995–96 Serie A season, he left for Foggia in a co-ownership deal. Zanchetta proved to me a mainstay in the line-up at his new club, making 57 league appearances in two seasons. After scoring seven goals in his second season with the club, Inter bought back the full registration rights to Zanchetta and sold him permanently to Chievo shortly after.

=== Chievo ===
At Chievo, he was one of the regular starters, and scored eight goals in the first season.

=== Reggina and Vicenza ===
After being almost relegated to Serie C1, Zanchetta secured a move to Serie A strugglers Reggina in co-ownership deal. He showed his talent in attack, scoring five goals in his second Serie A season, although Reggina was relegated. Concurrently, Chievo won promotion to Serie A by finishing third and bought back Zanchetta.

He played two league matches for Chievo in the 2001–02 Serie A season.

In summer 2001, he swapped clubs with Fabio Firmani, as both clubs co-owned the players. He collected three goals each in the two season with Vicenza at Serie B.

=== Return to Chievo ===
In June 2003, Firmani and Zanchetta moved back to their original clubs. With Chievo, which he was awarded a new contract until June 2007 in March 2004 (along with Salvatore Lanna), he failed to become the regular starter, but worked as a good backup player, for the team that had Mario Santana, Luciano, Franco Semioli and Victor Obinna in attack. He wore the number 10 shirt from 2004 to 2007, taking it over from Lorenzo D'Anna.

Due to the 2006 Italian football scandal, Chievo qualified for the 2006–07 UEFA Champions League; he played both legs in an attacking midfielder role. He also played in the 2006–07 UEFA Cup First Round both legs, as Chievo lost 2-3 on aggregate.

=== Lecce ===
In January 2007, he left for Lecce, in exchange for Giuseppe Cozzolino. In the first 1 1/2 seasons he was the regular starter, and won Serie A promotion in 2008, but faced relegation again in 2009.

=== Cremonese ===
In July 2009, he transferred to Cremonese in the Lega Pro Prima Divisione.

== Managerial career ==
After retiring, Zanchetti took on a career as a youth coach, working with the Under-17 team of Cremonese from 2011 to 2013, the Under-19 team of Juventus from 2013 to 2014 and the Under-19 team Alessandria from 2014 to 2015.

In the 2015–16 season, Zanchetta worked with Hellas Verona as a technical collaborator. He successively left to join the Inter Milan Youth Sector, working on different positions until 2025, when he was announced as the new first team head coach of Serie C club Novara.

== Personal life ==
Zanchetta is the father of the footballer Federico Zanchetta.
