= 2007–08 SS Lazio season =

Lazio
2007–08 season
- Owner: Claudio Lotito
- Chairman: Claudio Lotito
- Manager: Delio Rossi
- Serie A: 12th
- Coppa Italia: Semi-finals
- UEFA Champions League: Group stage
- Top goalscorer: League: Goran Pandev; Tommaso Rocchi (14 each); All: Goran Pandev (20 goals)
- Highest home attendance: 49,284 vs Roma
- Lowest home attendance: 14,891 vs Napoli
- Average home league attendance: 21,485
| Home colours | Away colours | Third colours |

The 2007–08 season was the 108th season in Società Sportiva Lazio's history and their 20th consecutive season in the top-flight of Italian football.

On 11 November 2007, a Lazio supporter, Gabriele Sandri was fatally wounded in an argument between Lazio and Juventus supporters, resulting in the police intervening and ultimately killing Sandri, who was not directly involved with the quarrel.

== Club ==
=== Management ===
| Position | Staff |
|---|---|
| Head coach | (Italy) Delio Rossi |
| Assistant coach | (Italy) Fedele Limone |
| Goalkeeping coach | (Italy) Adalberto Grigioni |
| Fitness coaches | (Italy) Valter Vio (Italy) Adriano Bianchini |
| Club doctors | (Italy) Roberto Bianchini (Italy) Stefano Salvatori |

Last updated: May 13, 2008
Source: S.S Lazio Staff

=== Other information ===
| President | (Italy) Claudio Lotito |
| Ground (capacity and dimensions) | Stadio Olimpico (82, 307 / 105m x 68m) |

Source: Stadio Olimpico article: May 13, 2008

== Squad ==
=== First team ===
As of 2008-02-08 Note: Flags indicate national team as defined under FIFA eligibility rules; some limited exceptions apply. Players may hold more than one non-FIFA nationality.

| No. | Pos. | Nation | Player |
|---|---|---|---|
| 1 | GK | ITA | Tommaso Berni |
| 2 | DF | ROU | Ștefan Radu (on loan from Dinamo București) |
| 3 | DF | SRB | Aleksandar Kolarov |
| 4 | MF | ITA | Fabio Firmani |
| 5 | MF | ITA | Massimo Mutarelli |
| 6 | MF | FRA | Ousmane Dabo |
| 7 | DF | CZE | David Rozehnal (on loan from Newcastle United) |
| 8 | DF | ITA | Luciano Zauri (captain) |
| 9 | FW | ITA | Rolando Bianchi (on loan from Manchester City) |
| 10 | MF | ITA | Roberto Baronio |
| 11 | MF | ITA | Stefano Mauri |
| 13 | DF | ITA | Sebastiano Siviglia |
| 14 | GK | ITA | Marco Ballotta |
| 15 | DF | FRA | Modibo Diakité |

| No. | Pos. | Nation | Player |
|---|---|---|---|
| 17 | FW | ALB | Igli Tare |
| 18 | FW | ITA | Tommaso Rocchi (vice-captain) |
| 19 | FW | MKD | Goran Pandev |
| 21 | FW | ITA | Fabio Vignaroli |
| 22 | DF | ITA | Ivan Artipoli |
| 23 | MF | FRA | Mourad Meghni |
| 24 | MF | ARG | Cristian Ledesma |
| 25 | DF | BRA | Emílson Cribari |
| 26 | MF | BEL | Gaby Mudingayi |
| 29 | DF | ITA | Lorenzo De Silvestri |
| 32 | GK | URU | Fernando Muslera |
| 68 | MF | CIV | Christian Manfredini |
| 81 | FW | ITA | Simone Del Nero |
| 85 | MF | SUI | Valon Behrami |

=== Double passports ===
- (Italy) Fernando Muslera
- (Italy) Igli Tare
- (Algeria) Mourad Meghni
- (Italy) Emílson Cribari
- (Italy) Christian Manfredini
- (Albania) Valon Behrami

=== Non-EU players ===
- (Serbia) Aleksandar Kolarov
- (Argentina) Cristian Ledesma
- (North Macedonia) Goran Pandev

== Competitions ==
=== Serie A ===
==== League table ====
| Pos | Team | Pld | W | D | L | GF | GA | GD | Pts |
|---|---|---|---|---|---|---|---|---|---|
| 10 | Genoa | 38 | 13 | 9 | 16 | 44 | 52 | −8 | 48 (Note: Atalanta finished ahead of Genoa on head-to-head points: Genoa 2-1 Atalanta, Atalanta 2-0 Genoa.) |
| 11 | Palermo | 38 | 12 | 11 | 15 | 47 | 57 | −10 | 47 |
| 12 | Lazio | 38 | 11 | 13 | 14 | 47 | 51 | −4 | 46 |
| 13 | Siena | 38 | 9 | 17 | 12 | 40 | 45 | −5 | 44 |
| 14 | Cagliari (Note: Cagliari was docked 3 points for filing an unauthorized lawsuit, but the penalty was later reversed.) | 38 | 11 | 9 | 18 | 40 | 56 | −16 | 42 |

Source: Serie A
Rules for classification: 1) points; 2) head-to-head points; 3) head-to-head goal difference; 4) head-to-head goals scored; 5) goal difference; 6) number of goals scored.

==== Results summary ====
| Overall | | | | | | | | Home | | | | | | Away | | | | | |
| Pld | W | D | L | GF | GA | GD | Pts | W | D | L | GF | GA | GD | W | D | L | GF | GA | GD |
|---|---|---|---|---|---|---|---|---|---|---|---|---|---|---|---|---|---|---|---|
| 38 | 11 | 13 | 14 | 47 | 51 | −4 | 46 | 9 | 4 | 6 | 28 | 23 | +5 | 2 | 9 | 8 | 19 | 28 | −9 |

==== Results by round ====
| Round | 1 | 2 | 3 | 4 | 5 | 6 | 7 | 8 | 9 | 10 | 11 | 12 | 13 | 14 | 15 | 16 | 17 | 18 | 19 | 20 | 21 | 22 | 23 | 24 | 25 | 26 | 27 | 28 | 29 | 30 | 31 | 32 | 33 | 34 | 35 | 36 | 37 | 38 |
|---|---|---|---|---|---|---|---|---|---|---|---|---|---|---|---|---|---|---|---|---|---|---|---|---|---|---|---|---|---|---|---|---|---|---|---|---|---|---|
| Ground | H | A | H | A | H | A | H | A | H | A | H | A | H | A | H | H | A | H | A | A | H | A | H | A | H | A | H | A | H | A | H | A | H | A | A | H | A | H |
| Result | D | D | D | L | W | D | L | W | L | L | L | L | W | D | W | L | D | L | D | D | W | L | W | L | W | D | W | D | W | L | D | D | D | L | L | L | W | W |
| Position | 7 | 11 | 12 | 13 | 9 | 11 | 13 | 11 | 13 | 14 | 15 | 15 | 14 | 15 | 12 | 13 | 13 | 14 | 14 | 14 | 12 | 13 | 12 | 12 | 12 | 12 | 11 | 11 | 8 | 10 | 11 | 11 | 12 | 12 | 12 | 13 | 12 | 12 |

Updated to match(es) played on 18 May 2008. Source: Competitive matches
A = Away; H = Home; W = Win; D = Draw; L = Loss

==== Matches ====
| 25 August 2007 1 | Lazio | 2–2 | Torino | Rome |
| 18:00 CEST (UTC+02:00) | Pandev 56'; Rocchi 61' | | Rosina 34'; Vailatti 68' | Stadium: Stadio Olimpico; Attendance: 21,495; Referee: Domenico Celi |

| 2 September 2007 2 | Sampdoria | 0–0 | Lazio | Genoa |
| 20:30 CEST (UTC+02:00) | | | | Stadium: Stadio Luigi Ferraris; Attendance: 20,564; Referee: Gianluca Rocchi |

| 15 September 2007 3 | Lazio | 0–0 | Empoli | Rome |
| 20:30 CEST (UTC+02:00) | | | | Stadium: Stadio Olimpico; Attendance: 19,460; Referee: Andrea De Marco |

| 23 September 2007 4 | Atalanta | 2–1 | Lazio | Bergamo |
| 15:00 CEST (UTC+02:00) | Langella 43'; Zampagna 90+3' | | Mutarelli 69' | Stadium: Stadio Atleti Azzurri d'Italia; Attendance: 10,861; Referee: Nicola Stefanini |

| 26 September 2007 5 | Lazio | 3–1 | Cagliari | Rome |
| 20:30 CEST (UTC+02:00) | Rocchi 47', 84'; Pandev 59' | | Acquafresca 69' | Stadium: Stadio Olimpico; Attendance: 17,652; Referee: Paolo Dondarini |

| 30 September 2007 6 | Reggina | 1–1 | Lazio | Reggio Calabria |
| 15:00 CEST (UTC+02:00) | Cozza 8' | | Kolarov 74' | Stadium: Stadio Oreste Granillo; Attendance: 16,842; Referee: Paolo Tagliavento |

| 7 October 2007 7 | Lazio | 1–5 | Milan | Rome |
| 20:30 CEST (UTC+02:00) | Mauri 23' | | Ambrosini 16'; Kaká 33' (pen.), 52'; Gilardino 70', 81' | Stadium: Stadio Olimpico; Attendance: 26,364; Referee: Emidio Morganti |

| 21 October 2007 8 | Livorno | 0–1 | Lazio | Livorno |
| 15:00 CEST (UTC+02:00) | | | Pandev 45+4' | Stadium: Stadio Armando Picchi; Attendance: 8,018; Referee: Domenico Celi |

| 28 October 2007 9 | Lazio | 0–1 | Udinese | Rome |
| 15:00 CEST (UTC+02:00) | | | Gyan 78' | Stadium: Stadio Olimpico; Attendance: 17,536; Referee: Nicola Pierpaoli |

| 31 October 2007 10 | Roma | 3–2 | Lazio | Rome |
| 20:30 CET (UTC+01:00) | Vučinić 19'; Mancini 42'; Perrotta 56' | | Rocchi 12'; Ledesma 70' | Stadium: Stadio Olimpico; Attendance: 54,860; Referee: Gianluca Rocchi |

| 3 November 2007 11 | Lazio | 0–1 | Fiorentina | Rome |
| 18:00 CET (UTC+01:00) | | | Pazzini 19' | Stadium: Stadio Olimpico; Attendance: 12,000; Referee: Paolo Dondarini |

| 25 November 2007 13 | Lazio | 1–0 | Parma | Rome |
| 15:00 CET (UTC+01:00) | Firmani 90' | | | Stadium: Stadio Olimpico; Attendance: 17,289; Referee: Andrea De Marco |

| 2 December 2007 14 | Siena | 1–1 | Lazio | Siena |
| 15:00 CET (UTC+01:00) | Maccarone 32' | | Pandev 23' | Stadium: Stadio Artemio Franchi; Attendance: 9,186; Referee: Antonio Giannoccaro |

| 5 December 2007 12 | Internazionale | 3–0 | Lazio | Milan |
| 20:30 CET (UTC+01:00) | Ibrahimović 22' (pen.); Maicon 33'; Suazo 55' | | | Stadium: San Siro; Attendance: 44,667; Referee: Antonio Damato |

| 8 December 2007 15 | Lazio | 2–0 | Catania | Rome |
| 18:00 CET (UTC+01:00) | Rocchi 8'; Pandev 89' | | | Stadium: Stadio Olimpico; Attendance: 17,291; Referee: Paolo Mazzoleni |

| 15 December 2007 16 | Lazio | 2–3 | Juventus | Rome |
| 20:30 CET (UTC+01:00) | Pandev 36', 90+3' | | Trezeguet 29'; Del Piero 48', 70' | Stadium: Stadio Olimpico; Attendance: 24,098; Referee: Christian Brighi |

| 23 December 2007 17 | Palermo | 2–2 | Lazio | Palermo |
| 15:00 CET (UTC+01:00) | Simplício 34'; Amauri 46' | | Firmani 59'; Tare 81' | Stadium: Stadio Renzo Barbera; Attendance: 24,128; Referee: Daniele Orsato |

| 13 January 2008 18 | Lazio | 1–2 | Genoa | Rome |
| 15:00 CET (UTC+01:00) | Mauri 23' | | Borriello 52' (pen.), 55' | Stadium: Stadio Olimpico; Attendance: 18,964; Referee: Nicola Stefanini |

| 20 January 2008 19 | Napoli | 2–2 | Lazio | Naples |
| 15:00 CET (UTC+01:00) | Hamšík 5', 90+4' | | Ledesma 26'; Pandev 31' | Stadium: Stadio San Paolo; Attendance: 34,480; Referee: Gianluca Rocchi |

| 27 January 2008 20 | Torino | 0–0 | Lazio | Turin |
| 15:00 CET (UTC+01:00) | | | | Stadium: Stadio Olimpico; Attendance: 17,653; Referee: Nicola Rizzoli |

| 3 February 2008 21 | Lazio | 2–1 | Sampdoria | Rome |
| 15:00 CET (UTC+01:00) | Mauri 37'; Rocchi 77' | | Cassano 45+1' | Stadium: Stadio Olimpico; Attendance: 18,683; Referee: Daniele Orsato |

| 10 February 2008 22 | Empoli | 1–0 | Lazio | Empoli |
| 15:00 CET (UTC+01:00) | Vannucchi 7' | | | Stadium: Stadio Carlo Castellani; Attendance: 7,232; Referee: Roberto Rosetti |

| 17 February 2008 23 | Lazio | 3–0 | Atalanta | Rome |
| 15:00 CET (UTC+01:00) | Rocchi 26' (pen.), 88' (pen.); Pandev 56' | | | Stadium: Stadio Olimpico; Attendance: 19,003; Referee: Oscar Girardi |

| 24 February 2008 24 | Cagliari | 1–0 | Lazio | Cagliari |
| 15:00 CET (UTC+01:00) | Matri 89' | | | Stadium: Stadio Sant'Elia; Attendance: 12,000; Referee: Nicola Pierpaoli |

| 27 February 2008 25 | Lazio | 1–0 | Reggina | Rome |
| 20:30 CET (UTC+01:00) | Bianchi 45' (pen.) | | | Stadium: Stadio Olimpico; Attendance: 17,663; Referee: Massimiliano Saccani |

| 1 March 2008 26 | Milan | 1–1 | Lazio | Milan |
| 20:30 CET (UTC+01:00) | Oddo 66' (pen.) | | Bianchi 54' | Stadium: San Siro; Attendance: 52,016; Referee: Domenico Celi |

| 9 March 2008 27 | Lazio | 2–0 | Livorno | Rome |
| 15:00 CET (UTC+01:00) | Rocchi 15'; Pandev 24' | | | Stadium: Stadio Olimpico; Attendance: 19,110; Referee: Paolo Mazzoleni |

| 16 March 2008 28 | Udinese | 2–2 | Lazio | Udine |
| 18:00 CET (UTC+01:00) | Ferronetti 56'; Di Natale 86' | | Rocchi 12'; Ledesma 80' | Stadium: Stadio Friuli; Attendance: 3,084; Referee: Dino Tommasi |

| 19 March 2008 29 | Lazio | 3–2 | Roma | Rome |
| 21:15 CET (UTC+01:00) | Pandev 43'; Rocchi 57' (pen.); Behrami 90+2' | | Taddei 31'; Perrotta 62' | Stadium: Stadio Olimpico; Attendance: 49,284; Referee: Emidio Morganti |

| 22 March 2008 30 | Fiorentina | 1–0 | Lazio | Florence |
| 15:00 CET (UTC+01:00) | Pazzini 77' | | | Stadium: Stadio Artemio Franchi; Attendance: 26,579; Referee: Daniele Orsato |

| 29 March 2008 31 | Lazio | 1–1 | Internazionale | Rome |
| 20:30 CET (UTC+01:00) | Rocchi 59' | | Crespo 11' | Stadium: Stadio Olimpico; Attendance: 32,802; Referee: Roberto Rosetti |

| 6 April 2008 32 | Parma | 2–2 | Lazio | Parma |
| 15:00 CEST (UTC+02:00) | Budan 17'; Paci 43' | | Pandev 35'; Bianchi 38' | Stadium: Stadio Ennio Tardini; Attendance: 13,000; Referee: Matteo Trefoloni |

| 13 April 2008 33 | Lazio | 1–1 | Siena | Rome |
| 15:00 CEST (UTC+02:00) | Mutarelli 45+1' | | Loria 88' | Stadium: Stadio Olimpico; Attendance: 18,996; Referee: Riccardo Pinzani |

| 20 April 2008 34 | Catania | 1–0 | Lazio | Catania |
| 15:00 CEST (UTC+02:00) | Spinesi 34' (pen.) | | | Stadium: Stadio Angelo Massimino; Attendance: 16,000; Referee: Domenico Celi |

| 27 April 2008 35 | Juventus | 5–2 | Lazio | Turin |
| 15:00 CEST (UTC+02:00) | Chiellini 15', 88'; Camoranesi 21'; Del Piero 32'; Trezeguet 33' | | Bianchi 56'; Siviglia 61' | Stadium: Stadio Olimpico; Attendance: 20,588; Referee: Andrea Gervasoni |

| 4 May 2008 36 | Lazio | 1–2 | Palermo | Rome |
| 15:00 CEST (UTC+02:00) | Pandev 25' (pen.) | | Amauri 82', 90+2' | Stadium: Stadio Olimpico; Attendance: 20,786; Referee: Luca Marelli |

| 11 May 2008 37 | Genoa | 0–2 | Lazio | Genoa |
| 15:00 CEST (UTC+02:00) | | | Pandev 32'; Rocchi 45+2' | Stadium: Stadio Luigi Ferraris; Attendance: 25,077; Referee: Nicola Pierpaoli |

| 18 May 2008 38 | Lazio | 2–1 | Napoli | Rome |
| 15:00 CEST (UTC+02:00) | Rocchi 14'; Firmani 71' | | Domizzi 83' | Stadium: Stadio Olimpico; Attendance: 3,000; Referee: Massimiliano Velotto |

=== Coppa Italia ===
==== Round of 16 ====
| 19 December 2007 First leg | Lazio | 2–1 | Napoli | Rome |
| 20:45 CET | De Silvestri 66'; Baronio 71' | | Dalla Bona 28' | Stadium: Stadio Olimpico; Attendance: 5,506; Referee: Nicola Stefanini |

| 17 January 2008 Second leg | Napoli | 1–1 (2–3 agg.) | Lazio | Naples |
| 20:45 CET | Domizzi 79' | | Tare 55' | Stadium: Stadio San Paolo; Attendance: 29,564; Referee: Paolo Mazzoleni |

==== Quarter-finals ====
| 24 January 2008 First leg | Lazio | 2–1 | Fiorentina | Rome |
| 20:00 CET | Kolarov 19'; Behrami 20' | | Pazzini 40' | Stadium: Stadio Olimpico; Attendance: 9,800; Referee: Massimiliano Saccani |

| 30 January 2008 Second leg | Fiorentina | 1–2 (2–4 agg.) | Lazio | Florence |
| 16:45 CET | Semioli 17' | | Kolarov 34'; Rocchi 62' | Stadium: Stadio Artemio Franchi; Attendance: 10,457; Referee: Christian Brighi |

==== Semi-finals ====
| 16 April 2008 First leg | Internazionale | 0–0 | Lazio | Milan |
| 20:30 CET | | | | Stadium: San Siro; Attendance: 11,016; Referee: Gianluca Rocchi |

| 7 May 2008 Second leg | Lazio | 0–2 (0–2 agg.) | Internazionale | Rome |
| 20:30 CET | | | Pelé 51'; Cruz 85' | Stadium: Stadio Olimpico; Attendance: 45,000; Referee: Massimiliano Saccani |

=== Top scorers ===
- (Italy) Tommaso Rocchi – 14 (3)
- (North Macedonia) Goran Pandev – 14 (1)
- (Italy) Rolando Bianchi – 4 (1)
- (Argentina) Cristian Ledesma – 3

=== UEFA Champions League ===
==== Third qualifying round ====
| 14 August 2007 First leg | Lazio (Italy) | 1–1 | (Romania) Dinamo București | Rome, Italy |
| 20:45 | Mutarelli 54' | Report | Dănciulescu 22' | Stadium: Stadio Olimpico; Attendance: 35,172; Referee: Tom Henning Øvrebø (Norway) |

| 28 August 2007 Second leg | Dinamo București (Romania) | 1–3 (2–4 agg.) | (Italy) Lazio | Bucharest, Romania |
| 21:00 | Bratu 27' | Report | Rocchi 47' (pen.), 66'; Pandev 53' | Stadium: Stadionul Național; Attendance: 40,164; Referee: Manuel Mejuto González (Spain) |

==== Group stage ====
===== Group C =====
| Pos | Team | Pld | W | D | L | GF | GA | GD | Pts | Qualification | RMA | OLY | BRM | LAZ |
|---|---|---|---|---|---|---|---|---|---|---|---|---|---|---|
| 1 | (Spain) Real Madrid | 6 | 3 | 2 | 1 | 13 | 9 | +4 | 11 | Advance to knockout stage | — | 4–2 | 2–1 | 3–1 |
| 2 | (Greece) Olympiacos | 6 | 3 | 2 | 1 | 11 | 7 | +4 | 11 | Advance to knockout stage | 0–0 | — | 3–0 | 1–1 |
| 3 | (Germany) Werder Bremen | 6 | 2 | 0 | 4 | 8 | 13 | −5 | 6 | Transfer to UEFA Cup | 3–2 | 1–3 | — | 2–1 |
| 4 | (Italy) Lazio | 6 | 1 | 2 | 3 | 8 | 11 | −3 | 5 | | 2–2 | 1–2 | 2–1 | — |

Source: RSSSF

| 18 September 2007 1 | Olympiacos (Greece) | 1–1 | (Italy) Lazio | Piraeus, Greece |
| 20:45 | Galletti 55' | Report | Zauri 77' | Stadium: Karaiskakis Stadium; Attendance: 171; Referee: Eric Braamhaar (Netherlands) |

| 3 October 2007 2 | Lazio (Italy) | 2–2 | (Spain) Real Madrid | Rome, Italy |
| 20:45 | Pandev 32', 75' | Report | Van Nistelrooy 8', 61' | Stadium: Stadio Olimpico; Attendance: 52,400; Referee: Frank De Bleeckere (Belgium) |

| 24 October 2007 3 | Werder Bremen (Germany) | 2–1 | (Italy) Lazio | Bremen, Germany |
| 20:45 | Sanogo 28'; Almeida 54' | Report | Manfredini 82' | Stadium: Weserstadion; Attendance: 36,587; Referee: Olegário Benquerença (Portugal) |

| 6 November 2007 4 | Lazio (Italy) | 2–1 | (Germany) Werder Bremen | Rome, Italy |
| 20:45 | Rocchi 57', 68' | Report | Diego 86' (pen.) | Stadium: Stadio Olimpico; Attendance: 28,236; Referee: Ivan Bebek (Croatia) |

| 28 November 2007 5 | Lazio (Italy) | 1–2 | (Greece) Olympiacos | Rome, Italy |
| 20:45 | Pandev 30' | Report | Galletti 35'; Kovačević 64' | Stadium: Stadio Olimpico; Attendance: 39,996; Referee: Howard Webb (England) |

| 11 December 2007 6 | Real Madrid (Spain) | 3–1 | (Italy) Lazio | Madrid, Spain |
| 20:45 | Baptista 13'; Raúl 16'; Robinho 36' | Report | Pandev 81' | Stadium: Santiago Bernabéu Stadium; Attendance: 70,559; Referee: Massimo Busacca (Switzerland) |
