= Cristiano Lupatelli =

Italian footballer (born 1978)

Personal information
- Date of birth: 21 June 1978 (age 48)
- Place of birth: Perugia, Italy
- Height: 1.89 m (6 ft 2 in)
- Position: Goalkeeper

Senior career*
Years	Team	Apps	(Gls)
1996–1999	Fidelis Andria	25	(0)
1999–2001	Roma	12	(0)
2001–2003	Chievo	59	(0)
2003–2004	Roma	0	(0)
2004–2008	Fiorentina	32	(0)
2005	→ Parma (loan)	8	(0)
2006	→ Palermo (loan)	5	(0)
2008–2010	Cagliari	5	(0)
2010–2011	Bologna	1	(0)
2011–2012	Genoa	0	(0)
2012–2015	Fiorentina	1	(0)
Total		148	(0)

International career
2000	Italy U21	2	(0)

Managerial career
- 2015–2017: Fiorentina U19 (goalkeeping)
- 2017–2018: Juventus U19 (goalkeeping)
- 2018–2022: Juventus Next Gen (goalkeeping)
- 2022–2023: Perugia (goalkeeping)
- * Club domestic league appearances and goals

Cristiano Lupatelli (born 21 June 1978) is an Italian professional football coach and former player who is the goalkeeping coach of club Juventus U23. As a player, he was a goalkeeper; he is known for his trademark goatee and sideburns with his bald head.

== Club career ==
Lupatelli was born in Perugia. He won a scudetto while playing for Roma in season 2000–01. A Roma youth product, Lupatelli was farmed to Chievo for the 2001–02 and 2002–03 seasons, after he played just 12 Serie A games for the capital club, wearing the number 10 jersey, despite being a goalkeeper, because of a bet he made with friends. He was sold to Chievo for three billion Italian lire in a co-ownership deal in 2002. In the 2003–04 season, he returned to Roma for €900,000, as the backup of Ivan Pelizzoli.

In summer 2004, he joined Fiorentina on a free transfer.

Lupatelli featured regularly for the Fiorentina first team in the 2004–05 season, but after the arrival of Sébastien Frey in 2005, Bogdan Lobonț in the 2006–07 season, and Vlada Avramov in 2007, he became the club's third choice keeper, and was loaned out to Parma during 2005–06 season for part of Frey's deal.

Whilst on loan at Parma, he was exchanged with Matteo Guardalben mid-season.

In September 2008, he joined Cagliari on a free transfer, acting as a deputy to Federico Marchetti.

He was set to become a free agent on 1 July 2010, and was not called up to the club's 2010–11 pre-season training camp. During the 2010–11 summer transfer window, he joined Bologna on a free transfer, as Emiliano Viviano's backup.

On 8 July 2011, he joined Genoa on a free transfer, after being released from Bologna. He served as the backup to Frey once again.

On 15 July 2012, he joined Fiorentina once again, on a free transfer.

He retired from football after his contract with Fiorentina expired on 1 July 2015.

== Managerial career ==
On 15 August 2018, Lupatelli was appointed goalkeeping coach of newly-formed Serie C club Juventus U23, the reserve team of Juventus.

== Career statistics ==
Appearances and goals by club, season and competition
Club	Season	League			Cup		Europe		Total	
Club	Season	Division	Apps	Goals	Apps	Goals	Apps	Goals	Apps	Goals
Fidelis Andria	1997–98	Serie B	0	0	—		—		0	0
Fidelis Andria	1998–99	Serie B	25	0	0	0	—		25	0
Fidelis Andria	Total		24	0	0	0	—		25	4
Roma	1999–2000	Serie A	4	0	0	0	0	0	4	0
Roma	2000–01	Serie A	8	0	0	0	2	0	10	0
Roma	Total		12	0	0	0	2	0	14	0
Chievo	2001–02	Serie A	33	0	2	0	—		35	0
Chievo	2002–03	Serie A	26	0	0	0	2	0	28	0
Chievo	Total		59	0	2	0	2	0	63	0
Roma	2003–04	Serie A	0	0	0	0	0	0	0	0
Fiorentina	2004–05	Serie A	30	0	5	0	—		35	0
Fiorentina	2006–07	Serie A	0	0	0	0	—		0	0
Fiorentina	2007–08	Serie A	2	0	3	0	1	0	6	0
Fiorentina	Total		32	0	8	0	1	0	41	0
Parma (loan)	2005–06	Serie A	8	0	3	0	—		11	0
Palermo (loan)	2005–06	Serie A	5	0	0	0	0	0	5	0
Cagliari	2008–09	Serie A	3	0	1	0	0	0	4	0
Cagliari	2009–10	Serie A	2	0	0	0	—		2	0
Cagliari	Total		5	0	1	0	0	0	6	0
Bologna	2010–11	Serie A	1	0	3	0	—		4	0
Genoa	2011–12	Serie A	0	0	2	0	—		2	0
Fiorentina	2012–13	Serie A	1	0	0	0	—		1	0
Fiorentina	2013–14	Serie A	0	0	0	0	0	0	0	0
Fiorentina	2014–15	Serie A	0	0	0	0	0	0	0	0
Fiorentina	Total		1	0	0	0	0	0	1	0
Career total			148	0	19	0	5	0	172	0
