= Mayele =

Mayele or Mayélé is a surname and given name. Notable people with the name include:

== Surname ==
- Fiston Kalala Mayele (born 1994), Congolese footballer
- Jason Mayélé (1976–2002), Congolese footballer
- Jessy Mayele (born 1991), Dutch footballer

== Given name ==
- Mayele Malango (born 1997), Congolese footballer
