= Ivano Della Morte =

Italian footballer and manager

Personal information
- Date of birth: 13 October 1974 (age 52)
- Place of birth: Cirié, Italy
- Height: 1.80 m (5 ft 11 in)
- Position: Midfielder

Senior career*
Years	Team	Apps	(Gls)
1992–1993	Torino	1	(0)
1993–1994	Monza	16	(0)
1994–1996	Lazio	0	(0)
1994–1995	→ Lecce (loan)	20	(1)
1995–1996	→ Avellino (loan)	20	(1)
1996–1997	Alessandria	26	(3)
1997–2000	Reggiana	42	(2)
1998–1999	→ Fidelis Andria (loan)	17	(1)
2000–2001	Lucchese	28	(2)
2001–2002	Vicenza	28	(1)
2002–2003	Chievo	24	(4)
2003–2005	Genoa	19	(0)
2005	→ Cesena (loan)	10	(0)
2005–2006	Ascoli	3	(0)
2006–2007	Alessandria	18	(5)

Managerial career
- 2008: Borgaro
- * Club domestic league appearances and goals

Ivano Della Morte (born 13 October 1974 in Cirié, Piedmont) is an Italian association football former player, and currently a manager. He played 28 Serie A matches, 154 Serie B, 72 in Serie C1, and retired in 2007 after a seasonal stint with Serie D outfit Alessandria. In 2007, he started working to take his coaching badges, and in 2008 he coached Piedmontese Eccellenza club Borgaro (based in Borgaro Torinese).

== Personal life ==
His son Matteo Della Morte is a footballer too.
