= Pietro Carmignani =

Italian footballer and coach

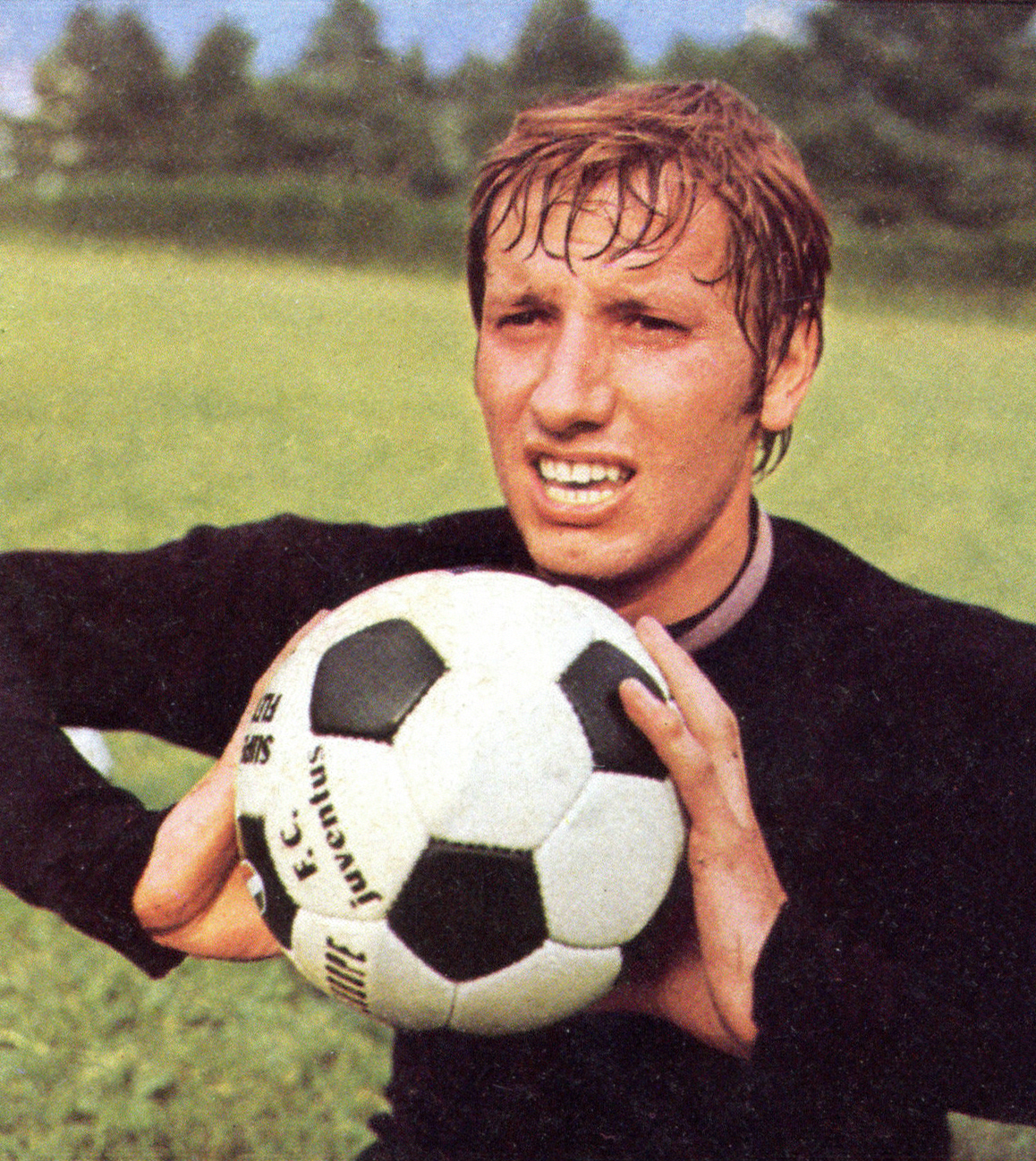

Personal information
- Date of birth: 22 January 1945 (age 81)
- Place of birth: Altopascio, Italy
- Height: 1.84 m (6 ft 1/2 in)
- Position: Goalkeeper

Senior career*
Years	Team	Apps	(Gls)
1964–1967	Como	47	(0)
1967–1971	Varese	92	(0)
1971–1972	Juventus	25	(0)
1972–1977	Napoli	144	(0)
1977–1979	Fiorentina	10	(0)
1979–1980	Rhodense	20	(0)

Managerial career
- 1982–1989: Parma (assistant)
- 1985: Parma (caretaker)
- 1989–1993: Milan (GK coach)
- 1991–1996: Italy (assistant)
- 1996–1997: Milan (assistant)
- 1998–1999: Atlético Madrid (assistant)
- 1999–2000: Livorno
- 2000–2001: Parma (assistant)
- 2001–2002: Parma
- 2002–2004: Parma (assistant)
- 2004–2005: Parma
- 2005–2007: Parma (youth)
- 2007–2008: Varese (assistant)
- 2008: Varese
- * Club domestic league appearances and goals

Pietro "Gedeone" Carmignani (born 22 January 1945) is an Italian professional football coach and former player. He is best known for his playing career as a goalkeeper and, later, for being one of the most trusted assistants of manager Arrigo Sacchi throughout his career.

== Honours ==
=== Player ===
Juventus

- Serie A: 1971–72.

Napoli

- Coppa Italia: 1975–76.

=== Manager ===
Parma

- Coppa Italia: 2001–02.
