= Sergio Buso =

Italian footballer and coach

Personal information
- Date of birth: 3 April 1950
- Place of birth: Padua, Italy
- Date of death: 24 December 2011 (aged 61)
- Place of death: Milan, Italy
- Position: Goalkeeper

Senior career*
Years	Team	Apps	(Gls)
1968–1972	Padova	70	(0)
1972–1975	Bologna	61	(0)
1975–1976	Cagliari	8	(0)
1976–1977	Novara	23	(0)
1977–1978	Taranto	20	(0)
1978–1979	Teramo	35	(0)
1979–1980	Taranto	16	(0)
1980–1984	Pisa	40	(0)
1984–1985	Mantova	1	(0)
1985–1986	Lucchese	1	(0)
Total		275	(0)

Managerial career
- 1993–1994: Trento
- 1999: Bologna
- 2000–2001: Taranto
- 2004–2005: Fiorentina
- 2005: Catanzaro
- * Club domestic league appearances and goals

Sergio Buso (3 April 1950 – 24 December 2011) was an Italian football coach and goalkeeper.

== Playing career ==
Buso started his professional career with hometown club Padova, then moving to Bologna in 1972. During his three years at Bologna, Buso also played the UEFA Cup Winners Cup and the Mitropa Cup, and won a Coppa Italia in 1974. He successively played with several other teams such as Cagliari, Novara, Taranto and Pisa, before to retire in 1986 after a single season with Lucchese.

== Coaching career ==
After his retirement, Buso decided to stay at Lucchese as assistant coach. In 1989, he joined Taranto as youth coach, and filled the same role at Modena between 1990 and 1993. In 1993–94 he then took his first role as head coach at Trento.

After a short stint as Foggia assistant, Buso became assistant/youth team coach at his former club Bologna, a role he filled since 1995. In 1999, he was promoted as caretaker head coach of the then-Serie A club, replacing Carlo Mazzone until the appointment of new permanent boss Francesco Guidolin. During this period he was defined as "Treccani of football" by then-chairman Giuseppe Gazzoni Frascara because of his extensive competence. He then left Bologna in 2000 to accept an offer from Serie C2 club Taranto, leading his side to direct promotion by the end of the season.

In 2001, he left Taranto to become new goalkeeping coach at Venezia under Cesare Prandelli. He then became Franco Colomba's assistant at SSC Napoli the following season, following him at Reggina one year later.

In 2004, he was appointed goalkeeping coach of newly promoted Serie A club Fiorentina, a role he left after a few weeks to become new head coach after the resignation of Emiliano Mondonico. His stint as Fiorentina boss turned out to the worse after a string of four consecutive defeats left the Viola in deep relegation zone, leading the board of directors to replace him with Dino Zoff. He then tried his luck as head coach of Serie B club Catanzaro, being however dismissed after a few weeks due to poor results.

In 2006, he accepted to serve as Roberto Donadoni's assistant in the Italy national team, a role he took until 2008. He then rejoined Donadoni during his short-lived period as head coach of Napoli.

== Death ==
Buso died on 24 December 2011, succumbing to a serious form of leukemia from which he had suffered for years.

== Honours ==
=== Player ===
Bologna

- Coppa Italia: 1973–74
