= Ivone De Franceschi =

Italian footballer (born 1974)

Personal information
- Date of birth: 1 January 1974 (age 52)
- Place of birth: Padua, Italy
- Height: 1.78 m (5 ft 10 in)
- Position: Winger

Youth career
- 1992–1994: Padova

Senior career*
| Years | Team | Apps | (Gls) |
| 1994–1998 | Padova | 19 | (3) |
| 1994–1995 | → Sandonà di Piave (loan) | 31 | (5) |
| 1995–1996 | → Rimini (loan) | 56 | (10) |
| 1998–2002 | = Venezia | 57 | (1) |
| 1999–2000 | → Sporting (loan) | 25 | (3) |
| 2001 | → Salernitana (loan) | 10 | (1) |
| 2002–2004 | Chievo | 11 | (0) |
| 2004 | → Bari (loan) | 15 | (1) |
| 2005–2007 | Padova | | |
- * Club domestic league appearances and goals

Ivone De Franceschi (born 1 January 1974) is an Italian former professional footballer who played as a midfielder. He enjoyed a number of spells playing for his hometown club Padova and also played for clubs such as ChievoVerona, Venezia, Sporting CP, Bari and Padova.

In June 2007, he announced his retirement because of health problems caused by a heart malformation. He currently serves as Yuri Korablin's assistant at Lega Pro side Venezia.

== History ==
- Padova (2005–2007) (Serie C1)
- Chievo Verona (2004) (Serie A)
- Bari (2004) (Serie B)
- Chievo Verona (2002–2004) (Serie A)
- Venezia (2001–2002) (Serie A)
- Salernitana (2000–2001) (Serie B)
- Venezia (2000–2001) (Serie B)
- Sporting Clube de Portugal (1999–2000)
- Venezia (1998–1999) (Serie A)
- Padova (1996–1998) (Serie B)
- Rimini (1995–1996) (Serie C2)
- Sandonà (1994–1995) (Serie C2)
- Padova (1992–1994) (Serie B)
