= Alessandro Rinaldi (footballer) =

Italian footballer (born 1974)

Personal information
- Date of birth: 23 November 1974 (age 51)
- Place of birth: Rome, Italy
- Height: 1.83 m (6 ft 0 in)
- Position: Defender

Youth career
- 1991–1993: Lazio

Senior career*
Years	Team	Apps	(Gls)
1993–1994	Nola	25	(3)
1994–1995	Verona	15	(0)
1995–1998	Ravenna	70	(2)
1998–1999	Bologna	22	(0)
1999–2001	Roma	32	(0)
2001–2003	Atalanta	13	(1)
2002	→ Chievo (loan)	2	(0)
2003	→ Piacenza (loan)	4	(0)
2003–2004	Triestina	0	(0)
Total		183	(6)

International career
1991	Italy U17	3	(0)
- * Club domestic league appearances and goals

Alessandro Rinaldi (born 23 November 1974) is a retired Italian footballer who played as a defender.

== Club career ==
Rinaldi began his career at U.S. Consalvo, a small team from the Quadraro district in Rome, before moving first to Lodigiani and then to Lazio. He never played for Lazio in the Serie A. In 1993, he was transferred to the Serie C1 team in Nola, where he caught the attention of scouts for Hellas Verona, for whom he played in the 1994–95 season in the Italian Serie B. He then moved to Ravenna, where he became a first-choice player and with whom he played for three seasons, and then to Bologna in 1998. In 1999, he moved to Roma, where he won the league championship in 2001.

He went to Roma along with Francesco Antonioli and Amedeo Mangone, which priced Rinaldi at 6 (short) billion Italian lire, Antonioli at 10 billion lire and Mangone at 13 billion lire, respectively. This was originally intended to be a swap deal for Antonio Chimenti and Ivan Tomić, however this failed. Instead, Pierre Womé joined Bologna.

In the 2001–02 season, he was sold to Atalanta for six billion Italian lire, and concurrently as part of this deal Ivan Pelizzoli joined Roma for 33 billion lire.

As part of Paolo Foglio's deal, he moved to Chievo in January 2002.

== International career ==
Rinaldi played for Italy at the 1991 FIFA U-17 World Championship in Italy.

== Honours ==
Bologna

- UEFA Intertoto Cup: 1998

Roma

- Serie A champion: 2000–01
