= Fabio Moro =

Italian footballer

Personal information
- Full name: Fabio Moro
- Date of birth: 13 July 1975 (age 51)
- Place of birth: Bassano del Grappa, Italy
- Height: 1.80 m (5 ft 11 in)
- Position: Defender

Youth career
- Bassano
- 1991–1994: AC Milan

Senior career*
Years	Team	Apps	(Gls)
1994–1995	Ravenna	25	(1)
1995–1996	Torino	8	(0)
1996–1997	Salernitana	25	(0)
1997–1999	Monza	51	(0)
1999	Parma	0	(0)
2000–2010	Chievo	232	(4)

International career
1991	Italy U17	1	(0)
- * Club domestic league appearances and goals

Fabio Moro (born 13 July 1975) is an Italian retired footballer who played as a defender.
