= Stefano Lorenzi =

Italian footballer

Personal information
- Date of birth: 18 January 1977 (age 49)
- Place of birth: Calcinate, Italy
- Height: 1.92 m (6 ft 4 in)
- Position: Defender

Team information
- Current team: Atalanta (U18 manager)

Youth career
- Atalanta

Senior career*
Years	Team	Apps	(Gls)
1994–2005	Atalanta	73	(2)
1996–1998	→ Carpi (loan)	49	(1)
2001–2003	→ Chievo (loan)	23	(0)
2004–2005	→ Arezzo (loan)	1	(0)
2005–2008	Treviso	14	(0)
2006	→ Pescara (loan)	8	(0)
2007–2008	→ Pisa (loan)	21	(1)
2008–2010	SPAL	46	(1)

Managerial career
- 2012–2017: Atalanta (youth)
- 2017–2019: Atalanta (U17)
- 2019–2021: Atalanta (U18)
- 2021–2022: Atalanta (youth)
- 2022–: Atalanta (U18)
- * Club domestic league appearances and goals

Stefano Lorenzi (born 18 January 1977) is an Italian professional football coach and a former player. He is the manager of the Under-18 squad of Atalanta.

He played 5 seasons (42 games, 1 goal) in the Serie A for Atalanta B.C., A.C. ChievoVerona and Treviso F.C. 1993.

Lorenzi joined Treviso in co-ownership deal for €100,000. In June 2006 Atalanta gave up the remain 50% registration rights. Lorenzi's contract expired on 30 June 2008.
