= Luigi Beghetto =

Italian footballer

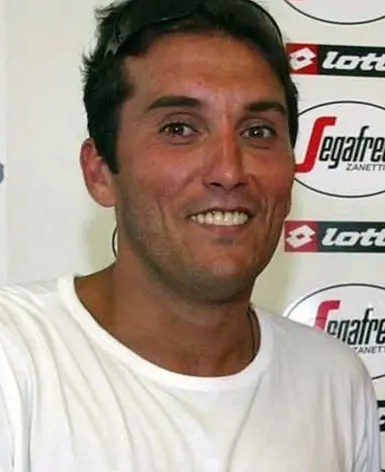

Personal information
- Date of birth: 6 July 1973 (age 53)
- Place of birth: Bassano del Grappa, Italy
- Height: 1.84 m (6 ft 1/2 in)
- Position: Striker

Youth career
- Bassano

Senior career*
Years	Team	Apps	(Gls)
1992–1994	Bassano	66	(26)
1994	Vicenza	0	(0)
1994–1995	Carpi	22	(9)
1995–1996	Fidelis Andria	30	(5)
1996–1997	Genoa	15	(2)
1997–1998	Pescara	29	(3)
1998–2000	Treviso	71	(26)
2000–2001	Cagliari	24	(1)
2001–2003	Chievo	18	(1)
2003–2005	Piacenza	71	(24)
2005–2009	Treviso	92	(21)
2009	AC Bellinzona	5	(1)
- * Club domestic league appearances and goals

Luigi Beghetto (born 6 July 1973 in Bassano del Grappa, Province of Vicenza) is an Italian footballer who played as a striker.

== Career ==
Beghetto started his career with hometown club Bassano, then in Serie D. He was then signed by Vicenza in July 1994, but was sold to Serie C1's Carpi on October without making a single appearance for his previous club. He then went on to play on several Serie B and Serie C1 teams, most notably Treviso (from 1998 and 2000) and Cagliari in 2000–01.

In October 2001 he was signed by Chievo, making his debut in the Serie A at the age of 28. In 2003, after two unremarkable seasons with the Verona-based club, Beghetto returned to play at Serie B level, this time with Piacenza, where he established himself as a key player for the Emilian club. In 2005, he returned to Treviso, joining the biancazzurri in their first ever Serie A campaign, however he did not manage to confirm his previous performances with Piacenza and scoring only once in the 2005–06 season, ended with Treviso being promptly relegated back to Serie B. In the following seasons with Treviso, Beghetto became one of the team mainstays as one of the most experienced players in the roster. In January 2009, 35-year-old Beghetto accepted to join Swiss Super League club AC Bellinzona in a permanent move.

== Personal life ==
Luigi's father Giuseppe is a former Olympic gold-medalist cyclist, his brother Massimo is a former footballer and current footballing coach, and his nephew Andrea is a professional footballer for Genoa.
