= Massimo Marazzina =

Italian footballer (born 1974)

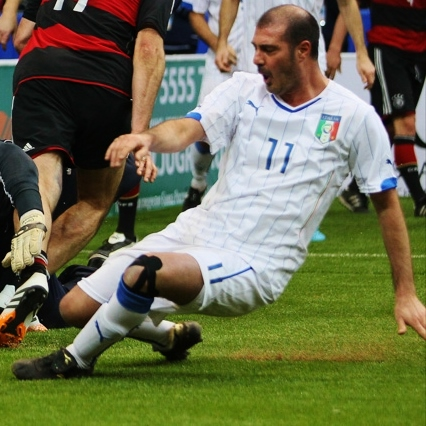

Personal information
- Date of birth: 16 July 1974 (age 52)
- Place of birth: Pandino, Italy
- Height: 1.80 m (5 ft 11 in)
- Position: Striker

Team information
- Current team: Sarasota Metropolis (head coach)

Youth career
- Fanfulla
- Internazionale

Senior career*
Years	Team	Apps	(Gls)
1993–1994	Internazionale	3	(0)
1994–1996	Foggia	36	(5)
1996–2004	Chievo	157	(45)
2000–2001	→ Reggina (co-ownership)	29	(4)
2003	→ Roma (loan)	7	(0)
2003–2004	→ Sampdoria (loan)	12	(0)
2004	→ Modena (loan)	13	(3)
2004–2005	Torino	41	(16)
2005	Siena	8	(0)
2006–2010	Bologna	118	(44)
Total		424	(117)

International career
2002	Italy	3	(0)

Managerial career
- 2019–: Sarasota Metropolis
- * Club domestic league appearances and goals

Massimo Marazzina (Italian pronunciation: [ˈmassimo maratˈtsiːna]; born 16 July 1974) is an Italian former professional footballer who played as a striker. Marazzina is the head coach and director of soccer for Sarasota Metropolis FC in USL League Two.

== Club career ==
=== Early years ===
Marazzina was born in Pandino, a city near Lodi in the Province of Cremona. He finished his football formation at Inter Milan, and made his Serie A debut on 27 February 1994, in a 2–0 away loss against Torino.

Subsequently, Marazzina moved to fellow first divisioner Foggia, suffering relegation in his first year, and played with the Apulia club one further season.

=== Chievo ===
In 1996, Marazzina signed for Chievo. In the 1999–2000 season, he scored sixteen goals for the Serie B club, one-third of the team's total. Noting his performances, first division team Reggina Calcio signed him in co-ownership deal; in the opening day of 2000–01, he scored his first top-flight goal in a 2–1 home win against Inter, but his side was eventually relegated.

Marazzina returned to Chievo in 2001, scoring thirteen goals and helping the club finish in fifth place and qualify for the 2002–03 UEFA Cup; in September 2002, he signed a four-year extension of his contract.

In January 2003, 29-year-old Marazzina was loaned to Roma to replace Gabriel Batistuta, who had left for Inter. In July 2003, he joined Sampdoria, newly promoted to Serie A, also on loan. He failed to be a regular starter, and in January 2004 moved to Modena on loan until the end of the 2003–04 Serie A season. He scored three goals during his four-month spell, but could not help prevent the Emilia-Romagna side from being relegated.

=== Torino ===
In July 2004, Marazzina signed for Torino, scoring sixteen goals to help the club finish third in division two, also winning the promotion playoffs against Ascoli Calcio 1898 and Perugia Calcio (where he netted in the second leg against the former and the first against the latter). However, the Turin outfit remained in its division because of its poor financial state, and all its players were allowed to leave for free, with the striker joining Siena in the top level.

=== Bologna ===
In January 2006, Marazzina signed for Bologna in Serie B, scoring eight goals in half a season. In 2006–07, he netted 12, with Claudio Bellucci adding 19 (more than 50% of the club's total), but the team could only rank eighth. After Bellucci's departure in 2007, he became the most important offensive reference, with Brazilian Adaílton becoming his new "sidekick".

Bologna returned to the first division in 2007–08, with Marazzina scoring 23 times, third-best in the league. With the arrival of Marco Di Vaio, however, the 34-year-old lost his importance in the squad's rotation, only appearing in 27 matches in the following two years combined, and being released in June 2010.

== International career ==
Marazzina made his debut for Italy on 13 February 2002, in a 1–0 friendly win over the United States, in Catania. He added two more caps in the same year, totalling three caps for Italy.

== Coaching ==
In 2019, Marazzina was named head coach and director of soccer for USL League Two expansion club Sarasota Metropolis FC.
