= Jason Mayélé =

Congolese footballer

Personal information
- Full name: Jason Nono Mayélé
- Date of birth: 4 January 1976
- Place of birth: Kinshasa, Zaire
- Date of death: 2 March 2002 (aged 26)
- Place of death: Bussolengo, Italy
- Height: 1.80 m (5 ft 11 in)
- Position: Forward

Senior career*
Years	Team	Apps	(Gls)
1991–1993	Brunoy		
1993–1999	Châteauroux	159	(32)
1999–2001	Cagliari	47	(1)
2001–2002	Chievo	10	(0)

International career
2000–2002	Congo DR	10	(5)
- * Club domestic league appearances and goals

Jason Nono Mayélé (4 January 1976 – 2 March 2002) was a Congolese professional footballer who played as a forward.

== Career ==
Mayélé played as a striker or winger and was a member of the Chievo team that qualified for Europe in their first Serie A season which he was signed in October. He had represented his country at the African Cup of Nations. Previously he had played for Cagliari in Italy and LB Châteauroux in France.

== Death ==
Mayélé died in a car accident at the age of 26. His car collided with another while he was attempting to catch the Chievo team bus for a match against Parma. He was taken to hospital in Verona by helicopter, but he died of injuries sustained.

Since his death, his shirt number of 30 has been retired in his honour by Chievo.
