= Fabio Firmani =

Italian retired footballer

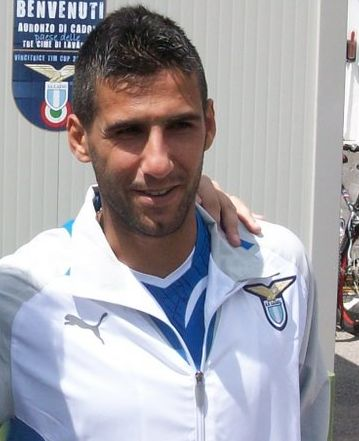
- Firmani as a Lazio player (2009)

Personal information
- Date of birth: 26 May 1978 (age 48)
- Place of birth: Rome, Italy
- Height: 1.78 m (5 ft 10 in)
- Position: Midfielder

Youth career
- Lodigiani

Senior career*
Years	Team	Apps	(Gls)
1995–1996	Lodigiani	20	(0)
1996–2001	Vicenza	70	(2)
1998–1999	→ Reggina (loan)	27	(1)
2001–2003	Chievo	1	(0)
2002	→ Bologna (loan)	5	(0)
2002–2003	→ Venezia (loan)	21	(1)
2003–2005	Catania	39	(0)
2005–2011	Lazio	36	(3)
2009	→ Al Wasl (loan)	1	(0)
2011	Shaanxi Renhe	18	(2)
Total		238	(9)

International career
1999–2000	Italy U21	10	(1)
- * Club domestic league appearances and goals

Fabio Firmani (born 26 May 1978) is an Italian retired footballer who played as a midfielder.

He amassed Serie A totals of 83 games and four goals over the course of ten seasons, representing in the competition Vicenza, Chievo, Bologna and Lazio.

== Club career ==
Born in Rome, Firmani began his career with local club Lodigiani in 1995, before moving the following season to Vicenza. He remained at the latter club for seven years, making his Serie A debut on 26 January 1997 in a 3–2 home win against Fiorentina, going on to collect nearly 100 official appearances. He also scored in the quarter-finals of the 1997–98 UEFA Cup Winners' Cup against Roda JC, in a 9–1 aggregate routing.

During his time in Veneto, Firmani headed south for a year, spending the 1998–99 campaign on loan at Reggina and splitting 2001–02 between Chievo (co-ownership with Vicenza) and Bologna. After competing in Serie B in 2002–03 with Venezia, he was finally released and joined Catania, helping them to two mid-table positions in the competition.

The following year, Firmani signed with Lazio, replacing Juventus-bound Giuliano Giannichedda. He made a good start to his career in the capital, but suffered a serious injury in November 2005, causing him to miss to rest of the campaign.

On 25 November 2007, Firmani scored his first goal for the Biancocelesti against Parma at the Stadio Olimpico, in a 1–0 victory. The goal, which was scored in the 90th minute, came only a week after the death of his good friend Gabriele Sandri, who was shot by a policeman, and the player's celebration with fans in Curva Nord earned him their recognition; due to injuries, he only managed seven appearances for the season but still netted three times, the other two being successful strikes against Palermo and Napoli.

Firmani's streak with injuries continued throughout the following campaign and, due to several physical problems, he did not feature whatsoever for his team. He did however, receive a red card during the 1–4 home loss to Cagliari, when he reacted to an incident involving opponent Daniele Conti and Goran Pandev. He received adulation and support from the Lazio fans following the incident, due to the insipid nature of the team's performance – a popular message was then adopted by the side's faithful, Noi vogliamo undici Firmani (We want eleven Firmanis).

Shortly after the incident, Firmani was requested by Lazio to accept a loan move that would help him regain match fitness. The club suggested some Saudi teams, but the player instead requested to join Al-Wasl in the United Arab Emirates; subsequently, the Italians accepted the latter offer.

Firmani returned to Lazio in July 2009, starting preseason training in the northern town of Auronzo di Cadore and trying to earn himself a place in new coach Davide Ballardini's team. In February 2011, after being released upon his request, the 33-year-old joined Chinese Super League side Shaanxi Renhe.

== International career ==
Firmani was never called up to the Italy national team, but collected ten caps for the under-21 side, scoring once.

He was a member of the side which won the 2000 UEFA European Under-21 Championship, and also played Olympic football in the same year, in Sydney.
