= Salvatore Lanna =

Italian footballer and manager

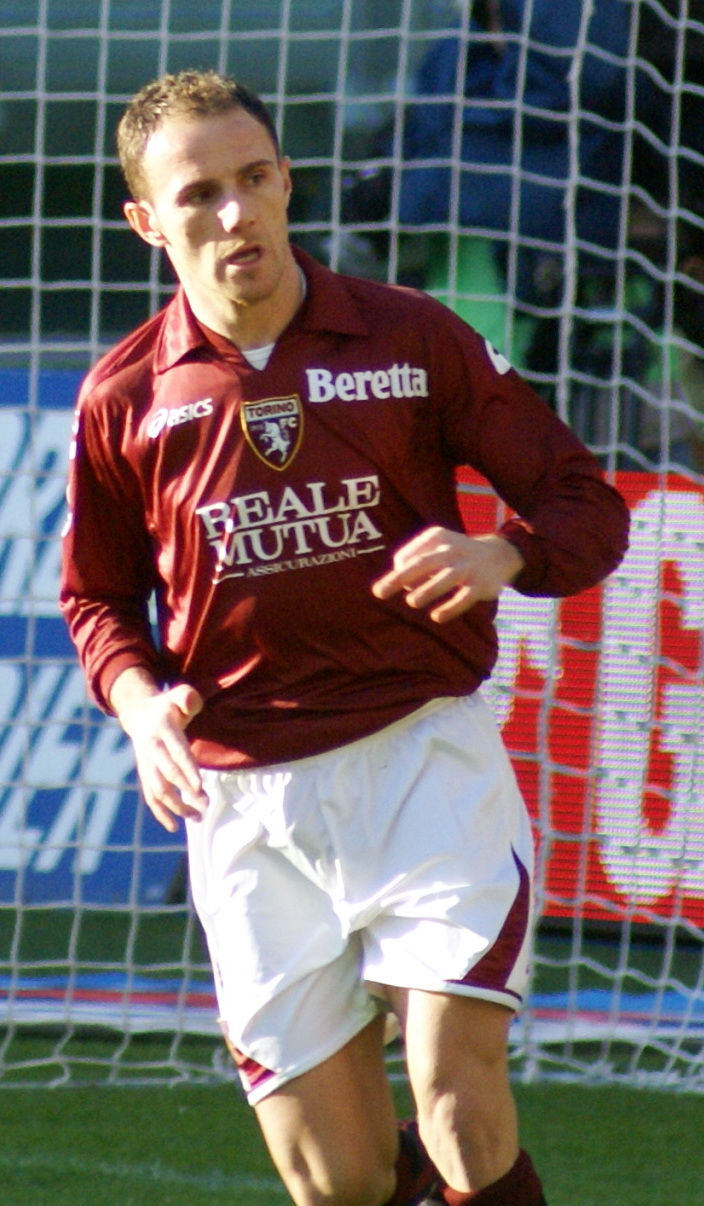
- Lanna with the shirt of Torino

Personal information
- Date of birth: 31 July 1976 (age 50)
- Place of birth: Carpi, Italy
- Height: 1.78 m (5 ft 10 in)
- Position: Defender

Team information
- Current team: Union Brescia (assistant)

Youth career
- 1992–1993: Carpi
- 1993–1994: Reggina

Senior career*
Years	Team	Apps	(Gls)
1994–1995	Reggina	6	(0)
1995–1996	Carpi	30	(0)
1996–2007	Chievo	312	(6)
2007–2008	Torino	29	(1)
2008–2010	Bologna	55	(0)
2010–2011	Reggiana	10	(0)

International career
2002	Italy	0	(0)
- * Club domestic league appearances and goals

Salvatore Lanna (born 31 July 1976 in Carpi, Modena) is the Italian association football former player who spent his career playing as a defender. He is currently Eugenio Corini's assistant coach at Union Brescia.

== Biography ==
=== Playing career ===
==== From Chievo to Torino ====
He is one of the most famous players in the history of Chievo, having played there for eleven seasons.

After Chievo were relegated to Serie B in 2007, he was transferred to Torino on a three-year contract.

In August 2008, newly promoted Bologna agreed a fee with Torino to sign Lanna in a co-ownership deal.

==== Reggiana ====
He has played for Reggiana from the 2010–11 season until the end of December 2011.

==== Italy national team ====
Late in 2002, he was called up twice to the Italy national team by their then-coach, Giovanni Trapattoni, but did not play a game either time.

=== Coaching career ===
On 3 January 2012, he was announced as the new assistant coach of Reggiana in Lega Pro Prima Divisione.

In December 2016, he was named the new assistant coach at Palermo as part of Eugenio Corini's backroom staff. He left the club following Corini's resignation in January 2017.

He successively followed Corini on his coaching experiences at Novara, Brescia and Lecce. In August 2022, he again followed Corini after he agreed to return to Palermo. He went on to work with Corini also at Cremonese in 2024, and Union Brescia from 2025.
