= Paolo Foglio =

Italian footballer

Personal information
- Date of birth: 8 September 1975 (age 51)
- Place of birth: Gazzaniga, Italy
- Height: 1.78 m (5 ft 10 in)
- Position: Right back

Youth career
- 1993–1994: Atalanta

Senior career*
Years	Team	Apps	(Gls)
1994–1998	Atalanta	45	(2)
1994–1996	→ Fiorenzuola (loan)	52	(6)
1998–1999	Hellas Verona	33	(1)
1999–2000	Reggina	15	(0)
2000–2001	Venezia	33	(2)
2001–2002	Chievo	2	(0)
2002–2003	Atalanta	36	(1)
2003–2006	Siena	40	(1)
2004	→ Genoa (loan)	14	(5)
2006–2008	Ascoli	13	(0)
2008	AlbinoLeffe	14	(1)
Total		297	(19)

International career
1993–1994	Italy U18	4	(0)
1997	Italy U21	2	(0)
- * Club domestic league appearances and goals

Paolo Foglio (born 8 September 1975) is a former Italian footballer. He played nearly 150 matches in Serie A.

Foglio primary played as a right-sided defender.

== Biography ==
Born in Gazzaniga, the Province of Bergamo, Foglio started his career at Atalanta Bergamo. After farmed to Serie C1 club Fiorenzuola for 2 seasons, he was included in Atalanta squad in 1996–97 Serie A season. Foglio played his first Serie A match on 15 September 1996, a 2–2 draw with A.C. Fiorentina. He replaced Gianluca Luppi in the 16th minutes. He played 44 league matches overall for the Lombardy side in 2 seasons. Atalanta relegated in 1998, and he was swapped with Sebastiano Siviglia of Hellas Verona. He won Serie B champion with the Veneto club, but then bought back by Atalanta and re-sold him to Reggina in co-ownership deal, which the team also won promotion to Serie A by finished 3rd in the Italian second division. He just played 15 league matches for the south Italy side. At the end of season, Atalanta bought him back again and sent him to A.C. Venezia in another co-ownership deal, which the team recently relegated from Serie A. Again he was the regular starter for the Venice side, and won promotion to Serie A again by finished 4th. In June 2001, Atalanta bought him back and sent back to Verona for Chievo, another promoted team.

=== Returned to Atalanta ===
After just played twice at Serie A, he was bought back by Atalanta and sent out-favoured Alessandro Rinaldi (who joined Atalanta in part-exchange deal with Siviglia in June 2001) to Chievo on loan in January 2002. He played 13 league matches for Atalanta since left the club 3 1/2 seasons ago. In the 2nd season, he was the first choice along with Massimo Carrera, Cesare Natali, Luigi Sala and Luciano Zauri (who played at midfield instead as left-back), made 9 starts in 12 appearances (until December). But in January, Siviglia (who can play right back or central back) returned to Atalanta, made his club debut on 6 January as Foglio's replacement on the 49th minutes. After he played the next match on 12 January as starting XI, Foglio lost his regular place until the last 4 matches of the season. Atalanta eventually same points with Reggina and lost to the south Italy side in relegation playoffs, which Atalanta surprising without Siviglia, Zauri nor Foglio and used Rustico-Sala-Carrera-Bellini, while Natali at bench for first leg. and Siviglia-Natali-Carrera-Bellini in 2nd leg after Sala was suspended.

=== Siena ===
Foglio then sold to Siena in another co-ownership on 17 July 2003. He just played 7 league appearances and 3 starts for the Serie A team, and loaned to Genoa in January 2004, which he scored 5 goals in 14 appearances. In the next 2 seasons, he back a back-up player with two-thirds of the appearances were substitutes.

=== Ascoli & AlbinoLeffe ===
Foglio then signed a contract with Serie B side Ascoli in June 2006 as free agent. He started 13 times for Ascoli before terminated his remain 6 months contract with the Marche side. On the next day, Foglio returned to the Province of Bergamo for Serie B side AlbinoLeffe. He ended his career there.

=== International career ===
Foglio was a member of Italy U18 team at 1994 UEFA European Under-18 Football Championship qualification (now U19 event). He also played twice at 1998 UEFA European Under-21 Football Championship qualification, replacing Roberto Baronio and Christian Amoroso respectively.

== Honours ==
- Serie B: 1999
