= Maurizio D'Angelo =

Italian footballer and manager

Personal information
- Date of birth: 29 September 1969 (age 57)
- Place of birth: Naples, Italy
- Height: 1.82 m (6 ft 0 in)
- Position: Defender

Team information
- Current team: Palermo (assistant)

Senior career*
Years	Team	Apps	(Gls)
1986–1987	Trissino		
1987–1988	Valdagno	29	(0)
1988–2003	Chievo	332	(2)
1989–1990	→ Valdagno (loan)	17	(0)
1990–1991	→ Derthona (loan)	25	(0)
2003	Napoli	15	(0)
2003–2004	Chievo	1	(0)

Managerial career
- 2005: Chievo (caretaker)
- 2008: Südtirol
- * Club domestic league appearances and goals

Maurizio D'Angelo (born 29 September 1969) is an Italian football manager and former player, who played as a centre back, best known for his career as Chievo captain during the 1990s. He is currently in charge as Filippo Inzaghi's assistant manager at Palermo.

== Career ==
=== Playing ===
A centre back, D'Angelo started his career playing for amateur team Trissino in 1986; he then joined Marzotto Valdagno, another amateur team, one year later, and finally signed for Chievo in 1988. During his first season with the gialloblù, D'Angelo made 17 appearances in the Serie C2 league. He then spent a couple of seasons on loan to Serie C2 teams Marzotto Valdagno and Derthona respectively. He returned to Chievo in 1991, finding his team in Serie C1 and quickly establishing himself as a mainstay for the Ceo, captaining his side to two promotions, and also in their subsequent Serie A campaigns.

He made his Serie A debut, together with several of his fellow Chievo players, on 26 August 2001, in a surprise away victory against Fiorentina. In 2002, he became a back-up player and consequently chose to leave the captaincy to Lorenzo D'Anna, another long-time Chievo player. In January 2003, he decided to leave Chievo, after twelve consecutive seasons with them, to join his hometown club Napoli, who were playing Serie B football at the time. He returned to Chievo later on in the summer, mainly helping Luigi Delneri with his coaching duties. He made his lone and final appearance with Chievo on 16 May 2004, in a Serie A home match against Bologna.

=== Coaching ===
Following his retirement in 2004, D'Angelo stayed at Chievo, joining the non-playing staff as assistant to new head coach Mario Beretta. However, despite a good start, Chievo found themselves in serious danger of relegation in the final Serie A weeks, and the club management decided to sack Beretta and appoint D'Angelo as caretaker for the three remaining matches. Under D'Angelo, Chievo ultimately managed to recover from their poor results and escaped relegation in the end.

For the following season, D'Angelo returned to serve as Chievo's assistant coach, this time working alongside Giuseppe Pillon. He then served as team scout from October 2006 to June 2008, leaving Chievo to become head coach of Serie C2 team F.C. Südtirol. He was, however, sacked only a few months later, on 12 November 2008, due to poor results.

In summer 2010, D'Angelo was hired as a part of the coaching staff at Juventus, serving as the assistant of new head coach Luigi Delneri. He stayed there the season out before he left the club. D'Angelo followed Delneri when he was appointed as the new head coach of Hellas Verona on 1 December 2015. D'Angelo became the technical coach of the club in Delneri's staff. He left the club again at the end of the season.

D'Angelo joined the staff of Filippo Inzaghi at Venezia for the 2016/17 season as his assistant coach. On 13 June 2018 it was announced, Inzaghi would leave the club and continue with Bologna, where he took D'Angelo with him. On 28 January 2019, Inzaghi and his staff, including D'Angelo, were fired. Subsequently he kept working under Inzaghi's wing at Benevento, Brescia, Reggina, Pisa and Palermo.
