= Federico Cossato =

Italian former footballer

Personal information
- Date of birth: 7 August 1972 (age 54)
- Place of birth: Verona, Italy
- Height: 1.87 m (6 ft 2 in)
- Position: Forward

Youth career
- 1991–1992: Avesa
- 1992–1995: Lugagnano

Senior career*
Years	Team	Apps	(Gls)
1995–1996	Valdagno	32	(6)
1996–1997	Brescello	26	(7)
1997–2008	Chievo	239	(48)
- * Club domestic league appearances and goals

Federico Cossato (born 7 August 1972) is an Italian former footballer who played as a forward. He is the brother of fellow former footballer Michele Cossato.

Cossato started his career at Serie D clubs, he then played for Valdagno at Serie C2 and Brescello at Serie C1. in mid-1997 he joined Chievo, which he played until 2008.

During mid-2005, he made a transfer request, partially due to the rise of Amauri and Simone Tiribocchi. He played 4 Serie A matches that season as the team have Amauri, Tiribocchi and Sergio Pellissier. In 2006–07 season, he club had Victor Obinna, Erjon Bogdani Cossato often played as substitute. In 2007–08 season, he stayed with the club at Serie B to win Serie A return in 1 seasons. In mid-2008 he left for Domegliara at Serie D.

== Italian football scandal ==
On 18 June 2012 Federico was banned from all football activities for 3 years and 6 months due to 2011–12 Italian football scandal.

== Honours ==
Chievo

- Serie B: 2007–08
