= Eugenio Corini =

Italian footballer (born 1970)

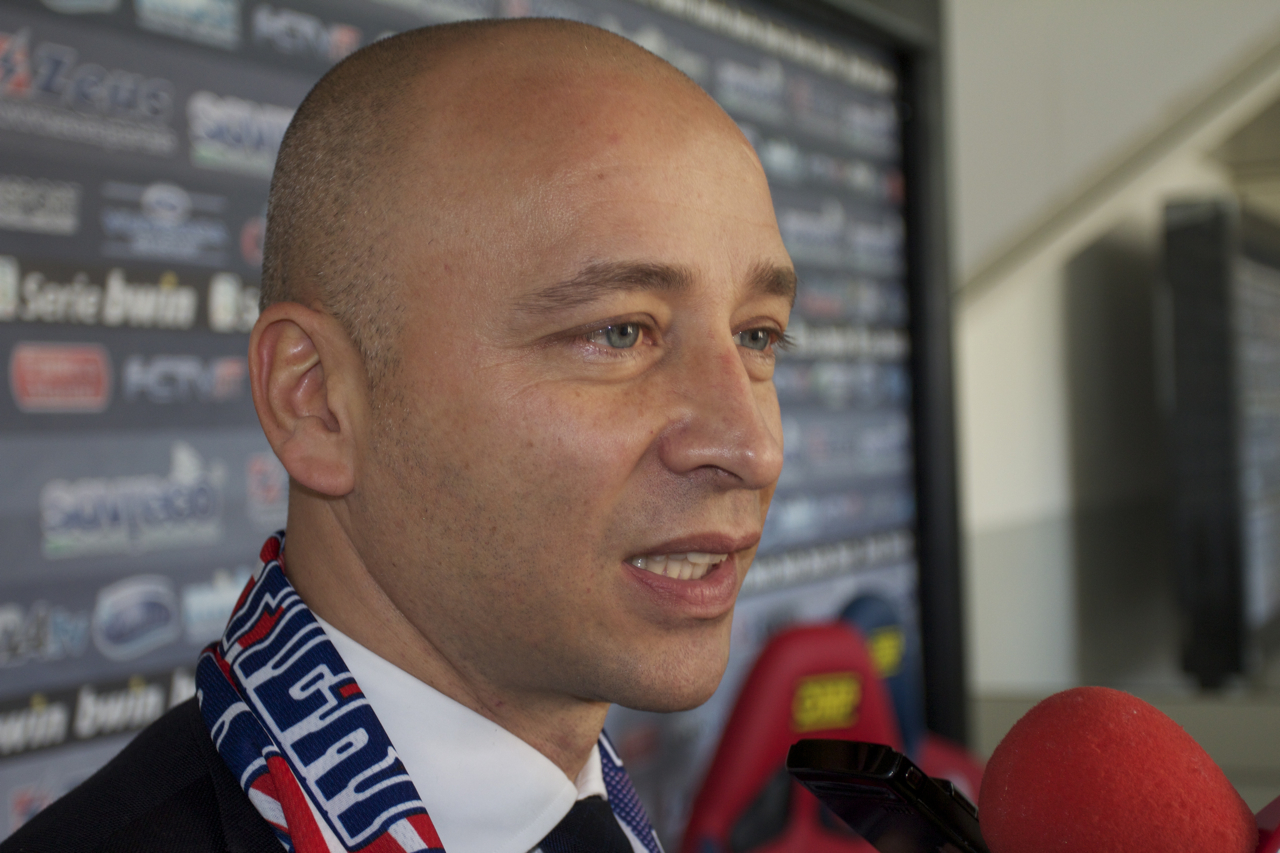
- Corini in 2010

Personal information
- Full name: Eugenio Corini
- Date of birth: 30 July 1970 (age 56)
- Place of birth: Bagnolo Mella, Italy
- Height: 1.75 m (5 ft 9 in)
- Position: Midfielder

Team information
- Current team: Union Brescia (head coach)

Senior career*
| Years | Team | Apps | (Gls) |
| 1986–1990 | Brescia | 77 | (9) |
| 1990–1992 | Juventus | 47 | (2) |
| 1992–1996 | Sampdoria | 24 | (4) |
| 1993–1994 | → Napoli | 17 | (0) |
| 1994–1995 | → Brescia | 24 | (2) |
| 1995–1996 | → Piacenza | 32 | (1) |
| 1996–1998 | Verona | 46 | (4) |
| 1998–2003 | Chievo | 134 | (27) |
| 2003–2007 | Palermo | 124 | (25) |
| 2007–2009 | Torino | 44 | (1) |
| Total | | 569 | (75) |

International career
| 1988–1992 | Italy U21 | 29 | (1) |

Managerial career
- 2010: Portosummaga
- 2010–2011: Crotone
- 2011–2012: Frosinone
- 2012–2013: Chievo
- 2013–2014: Chievo
- 2016–2017: Palermo
- 2017–2018: Novara
- 2018–2019: Brescia
- 2019–2020: Brescia
- 2020–2021: Lecce
- 2022: Brescia
- 2022–2024: Palermo
- 2024: Cremonese
- 2025–: Union Brescia
- * Club domestic league appearances and goals

Eugenio Corini (born 30 July 1970) is an Italian professional football coach and former player, currently in charge of Serie C Group A club Union Brescia.

A playmaker, known for his precise long passing, flair and his ability to orchestrate his team's attacking moves or provide assists for teammates, Corini usually played either as an attacking midfielder or as a deep lying playmaker in midfield. A set-piece specialist, he was also known for his accuracy from free kicks, corners and penalty kicks.

== Club career ==
Corini began his career in the Brescia youth squad, but by age 16 he was called up to the first team, making his debut the following season. He became a regular for Lombardian in the 1988–89 and 1989–90 seasons before being signed by Juventus.

In his first season with Juventus, at 20, Corini played 25 times and scored one goal.

In 1992–93, Corini was sold to Sampdoria, where he made 24 appearances and had several injury problems. In the next few years, Corini moved from team to team almost every season (Napoli, Brescia again and Piacenza) without being able to show his full potential.

In October 1998, Verona loaned him to city rivals Chievo, in Serie B. Corini soon became a mainstay of the team, leading his team as captain to an extraordinary promotion for Serie A in 2001, and 2002 FIFA World Cup qualification (UEFA), after having been first-placed at the winter break.

Corini joined Palermo in 2003, helping them win the 2003–04 Serie B league title, followed by UEFA Cup qualification in each of the three subsequent seasons. He later served as the club captain. In June 2007, he announced he would not renew his contract with Palermo. A few days later, he was signed by Torino, age 37. He was confirmed with the Granata also for the 2008–09 season, which he stated would be his final one as a footballer. In May 2009, Corini confirmed his retirement as a player after failing to recover from a recurring Achilles tendon injury that required surgery, which kept him out for the final part of the season and led to Torino's relegation to Serie B. He also stated his intention to try his hand at coaching in the future.

== International career ==
Corini became a regular also in the Italy u21 team of the early 1990s, winning a UEFA European Under-21 Championship, and representing Italy in the 1992 Summer Olympics held in Barcelona.

Despite his success for Italy at the youth level and for various club-level teams, he was never capped for the senior national team in a career spanning almost two decades. However, he received call-ups during the 1992–93 season and in November 2002.

== Managerial career ==
After announcing his retirement, Corini was successively linked to several vacancies in Italian football. On 5 July 2010, Corini was unveiled as the new head coach of Portosummaga, a newly promoted 2010–11 Serie B club; he agreed to become the club's new head coach despite not having the required coaching badge qualification at the time of the appointment. He had only a UEFA A License, so UEFA Pro graduate Salvatore Giunta worked alongside him.

Unexpectedly, Corini left the club twelve days later, together with director of football Giuseppe Magalini, due to disagreements with the board regarding the transfer market policy and the future plans for the team.

On 27 November 2010, he was appointed head coach of Serie B club Crotone, replacing Leonardo Menichini. His experience with the Calabrian club turned out to be short-lived, as he was dismissed later on 20 February 2011, following a string of poor results that left Crotone in danger of relegation.

From 30 November 2011 through the end of the season, he coached Frosinone in Lega Pro Prima Divisione, replacing Carlo Sabatini.

On 2 October 2012, he was named the new head coach of Chievo in place of Domenico Di Carlo, after the team suffered five consecutive defeats in the first six games of the season. Corini and Chievo parted ways on 29 May 2013 by mutual consent; Corini returned to Chievo four months later, being appointed on 12 November 2013 to replace Giuseppe Sannino. He guided Chievo to maintain their Serie A status by the end of the season and was thus given the job on a permanent basis, but was subsequently sacked on 19 October following a 3–0 defeat to Roma that left the club with four points in seven games.

On 30 November 2016, Corini was appointed manager of Palermo. He resigned on 24 January 2017.

On 4 February 2018, he was fired as manager of Novara.

He returned to management on 18 September 2018, being named new head coach of Brescia, his first club as a player, in place of David Suazo. He was sacked on 3 November 2019. He was re-hired by Brescia on 2 December 2019. On 5 February 2020, he was dismissed by Brescia once more. He became head coach of Serie B club Lecce on 22 August 2020. After Lecce failed to gain promotion to Serie A at the end of the 2020–21 season by losing in the promotion play-offs, he was dismissed on 22 May 2021.

On 23 March 2022, Corini was announced as the new head coach of Serie B club Brescia, thus marking his return with the Rondinelle, two years after his last stint at the club. He guided Brescia to the promotion playoffs, where they were defeated by eventual winners Monza in the semi-finals; on 14 June 2022, Corini parted ways with Brescia by mutual consent.

On 7 August 2022, Corini agreed to return to Palermo as head coach, signing a two-year contract with the newly promoted Serie B club. After narrowly missing out on a promotion playoff spot, he was confirmed for one more season with a significantly strengthened squad and the goal of leading Palermo to a promotion spot; he was however sacked on 3 April 2024, following a last-minute 3–4 loss at Pisa that left the Rosanero in sixth place, far away from a direct promotion spot with seven games remaining.

On 9 October 2024, Corini took over as the new head coach of Serie B club Cremonese, signing a contract until the end of the 2024–25 season. His stint at Cremonese turned out to be short-lived, as he was dismissed just a month later, on 11 November, following two consecutive league defeats.

On 11 December 2025, Corini took over at Serie C club Union Brescia, the unofficial heir of the disbanded Brescia club, agreeing on a three-year deal as head coach.

== Career statistics ==
=== Club ===
Appearances and goals by club, season and competition
| Club | Season | League | | | Coppa Italia | | Total | |
| Club | Season | Division | Apps | Goals | Apps | Goals | Apps | Goals |
|---|---|---|---|---|---|---|---|---|
| Brescia | 1986–87 | Serie A | 0 | 0 | | | | |
| Brescia | 1987–88 | Serie B | 14 | 0 | | | | |
| Brescia | 1988–89 | Serie B | 29 | 0 | | | | |
| Brescia | 1989–90 | Serie B | 34 | 9 | | | | |
| Juventus | 1990–91 | Serie A | 25 | 1 | | | | |
| Juventus | 1991–92 | Serie A | 22 | 1 | | | | |
| Sampdoria | 1992–93 | Serie A | 24 | 4 | | | | |
| Napoli (loan) | 1993–94 | Serie A | 14 | 0 | | | | |
| Napoli (loan) | 1994–95 | Serie A | 3 | 0 | | | | |
| Brescia (loan) | 1994–95 | Serie A | 24 | 2 | | | | |
| Piacenza (loan) | 1995–96 | Serie A | 32 | 1 | | | | |
| Verona | 1996–97 | Serie A | 9 | 1 | | | | |
| Verona | 1997–98 | Serie B | 35 | 3 | | | | |
| Verona | 1998–99 | Serie B | 2 | 0 | | | | |
| Chievo | 1998–99 | Serie B | 7 | 0 | | | | |
| Chievo | 1999–2000 | Serie B | 31 | 6 | | | | |
| Chievo | 2000–01 | Serie B | 36 | 7 | | | | |
| Chievo | 2001–02 | Serie A | 30 | 9 | | | | |
| Chievo | 2002–03 | Serie A | 30 | 5 | | | | |
| Palermo | 2003–04 | Serie B | 40 | 12 | | | | |
| Palermo | 2004–05 | Serie A | 33 | 0 | | | | |
| Palermo | 2005–06 | Serie A | 24 | 3 | | | | |
| Palermo | 2006–07 | Serie A | 27 | 10 | | | | |
| Torino | 2007–08 | Serie A | 32 | 1 | | | | |
| Torino | 2008–09 | Serie A | 12 | 0 | | | | |
| Career total | | | 569 | 75 | | | | |

== Managerial statistics ==
As of match played 1 April 2024

Managerial record by team and tenure
| Team | Nat | From | To | Record | | | | | | | |
| Team | Nat | From | To | G | W | D | L | GF | GA | GD | Win % |
|---|---|---|---|---|---|---|---|---|---|---|---|
| Portosummaga | (Italy) | 5 July 2010 | 17 July 2010 | 0 | 0 | 0 | 0 | 0 | 0 | +0 | — |
| Crotone | (Italy) | 28 November 2010 | 20 February 2011 | 10 | 1 | 5 | 4 | 7 | 12 | −5 | 10.00 |
| Frosinone | (Italy) | 30 November 2011 | 7 June 2012 | 20 | 8 | 2 | 10 | 22 | 22 | +0 | 40.00 |
| Chievo | (Italy) | 3 October 2012 | 29 May 2013 | 33 | 11 | 9 | 13 | 33 | 40 | −7 | 33.33 |
| Chievo | (Italy) | 12 November 2013 | 19 October 2014 | 36 | 11 | 4 | 21 | 36 | 52 | −16 | 30.56 |
| Palermo | (Italy) | 30 November 2016 | 24 January 2017 | 7 | 1 | 1 | 5 | 7 | 14 | −7 | 14.29 |
| Novara | (Italy) | 14 June 2017 | 4 February 2018 | 25 | 7 | 6 | 12 | 27 | 32 | −5 | 28.00 |
| Brescia | (Italy) | 18 September 2018 | 3 November 2019 | 44 | 20 | 12 | 12 | 76 | 55 | +21 | 45.45 |
| Brescia | (Italy) | 2 December 2019 | 5 February 2020 | 9 | 2 | 2 | 5 | 10 | 15 | −5 | 22.22 |
| Lecce | (Italy) | 22 August 2020 | 22 May 2021 | 42 | 17 | 15 | 10 | 72 | 52 | +20 | 40.48 |
| Brescia | (Italy) | 23 March 2022 | 30 June 2022 | 10 | 4 | 3 | 3 | 13 | 9 | +4 | 40.00 |
| Palermo | (Italy) | 1 July 2022 | 3 April 2024 | 72 | 26 | 23 | 23 | 107 | 101 | +6 | 36.11 |
| Total | | | | 308 | 108 | 82 | 118 | 410 | 404 | +6 | 35.06 |

== Honours ==
=== Player ===
Palermo

- Serie B: 2003–04

Individual

- Serie A Top Assist-provider: 2001–02 (11 assists)

=== Manager ===
Brescia

- Serie B: 2018–19
