= Luciano (footballer, born 1975) =

Brazilian footballer

Personal information
- Full name: Luciano Siqueira de Oliveira
- Date of birth: 3 December 1975 (age 50)
- Place of birth: Rio de Janeiro, Brazil
- Height: 1.81 m (5 ft 11 in)
- Position: Right winger

Youth career
- Palmeiras

Senior career*
Years	Team	Apps	(Gls)
1997–1998	Palmeiras	12	(0)
1998–2000	Bologna	33	(2)
2000–2013	Chievo	249	(16)
2003–2004	→ Internazionale (loan)	5	(0)
2013–2014	Mantova	6	(0)
- * Club domestic league appearances and goals

Luciano Siqueira de Oliveira (born 3 December 1975), known as Luciano and previously Eriberto, is a Brazilian former footballer who played as a winger. He spent most of his career with Italian club Chievo Verona.

== Career ==
=== Palmeiras and Bologna ===
Luciano started his career as Eriberto at Palmeiras aged 21 but publicly 18. After 1 1/2 seasons, he joined Bologna and made his Serie A debut on 12 September 1998 the first match of the season. He replaced Giancarlo Marocchi in the 82nd minutes and Bologna lost 0–3 to AC Milan. During his time at Bologna he was known for his troublesome behaviour and only played 33 league matches in 2 seasons.

=== Chievo ===
In summer 2000, he joined Serie B side Chievo (at first on loan) where he played regularly. Along with Christian Manfredini formed an effective attack on both wings: due to their African origins, they were known as Black Arrows. They won promotion to Serie A in 2001; the Verona club then purchased half of the registration rights for about 1.9 billion Italian lire.

In June 2002, Chievo and Bologna failed to agree the price of the player and Chievo won after an auction. Then it was reported that Eriberto, along with Manfredini, had signed for Lazio, but the deal was called off due to the fact he was banned from football due to passport controversy.

He returned to football using his real name Luciano. On 26 January 2003, he played his first league match of the season, against Perugia as a starter, but Chievo lost 0–1. In April 2003, FIGC ordered Chievo to pay Bologna €6.22 million that owed Bologna in June 2002. Chievo finished seventh in the 2002–03 Serie A season.

=== Inter loan ===
In July 2003, Luciano went to Internazionale on loan with option to sign permanently. Italian winger Franco Semioli, who bought by Inter from Torino, joined Chievo in co-ownership deal as part of the deal. That season Inter also signed winger Andy van der Meyde, Kily González and Khalilou Fadiga. Luciano was injured in September and returned in late October. He played his first match since recovered from injury on 22 November 2003, replaced Javier Zanetti in the 65th minutes as a wing-back. That match Inter won Reggina 6–0. He then played twice at Coppa Italia before sent back to Chievo.

=== Return to Chievo ===
At Chievo he failed to become a regular starter, because the coach employed Semioli instead, but Luciano managed to play near 20 league matches in 2004–05 and 2005–06 seasons. With Semioli on the right side and Amauri and Sergio Pellissier up front, they had an impressive 2005–06 season, after which Chievo qualified for the 2006–07 UEFA Champions League third qualifying round with a fourth-place finish in the league; although Chievo had initially finished seventh in the league, which meant they only qualified for the 2006–07 UEFA Cup, following the 2006 Italian football scandal, Chievo were later moved up to fourth place.

He played the return leg of Champions League third qualifying round against PFC Levski Sofia, replacing Franco Semioli in the second half. He also played for Chievo at UEFA Cup first round return leg as a starter as Semioli rested. In 2006–07 season, he played 12 starts in 14 league appearances. In 2007–08 season, Luciano followed Chievo after its relegation to Serie B and regained his place in the starting line-up, playing 26 starts and 10 substitute appearances in the league. In the next season, Luciano played as the starter right winger, but during the season was also employed as an attacking midfielder and as a forward in the 4–3–3 formation.

In 2009–10 season, he is the absolute starter in the right wing position except for two league matches, when Giampiero Pinzi moved from attacking midfielder to right midfielder and Luciano played as substitutes. He was suspended for 3 matches: on 29 November, 7 March and 25 April. He also rested on round 33 and 36.

On 27 May 2010, Chievo announced Luciano had signed a new 1-year contract. He was the starting right midfielder of the team, until injured on 19 September 2010 and missed 5 months. He returned to team on 3 March, winning Prima Categoria team San Secondo Parmense 11–0. On 13 March he came off from the bench against Fiorentina, substituted right midfielder Nico Pulzetti (in a 5–3–2 formation), but in 72 minutes replaced by forward Fernando Uribe. He had a muscle problem and missed the rest of fixture. On 31 May Chievo offered another 1-year contract to him.

=== Mantova ===
On 23 July 2013, Mantova officially announced the signing of the former Chievo veteran midfielder on their website. Luciano signed a one-year contract with the Lega Pro Seconda Divisione outfit, with the option of a second year.

== Style of play ==
An explosive, hard-working, and creative right winger, Luciano was known for his pace, stamina, and crossing ability, as well as his ability to assist his team both offensively and defensively, which allowed him to cover the right flank effectively.

== Passport controversy ==
In 2002, he was exposed as holding a fake passport which claimed he was named Eriberto Conceição da Silva, born in Rio de Janeiro on 21 January 1979. For this he was handed a six-month ban and a $145,000 fine. He assumed the identity of someone who was then his neighbor in order to join the Palmeiras youth team, as he was too old. He revealed the deception so that he could give his son his true surname.

== Honours ==
Palmeiras

- Copa Mercosur: 1998
- Copa do Brasil: 1998

ChievoVerona

- Serie B: 2007–08
- Coppa Ali della Vittoria: 2007–08
