= Christian Manfredini =

Ivorian footballer

Personal information
- Full name: Christian José Manfredini Sisostri
- Date of birth: 1 May 1975 (age 51)
- Place of birth: Port Bouët, Abidjan, Ivory Coast
- Height: 1.80 m (5 ft 11 in)
- Positions: Left midfielder; left winger

Team information
- Current team: Agropoli

Youth career
- 1993–1994: Juventus

Senior career*
Years	Team	Apps	(Gls)
1994–1999	Juventus	0	(0)
1994–1995	→ Pistoiese (loan)	14	(1)
1995–1996	→ Viterbese (loan)	32	(3)
1996–1997	→ Avezzano (loan)	30	(2)
1997–1998	→ Fermana (loan)	26	(3)
1998–1999	→ Cosenza (loan)	32	(4)
1999–2000	Genoa	26	(1)
2000–2002	Chievo	64	(9)
2002–2011	Lazio	101	(5)
2003	→ Osasuna (loan)	11	(1)
2003–2004	→ Fiorentina (loan)	11	(1)
2004	→ Perugia (loan)	12	(0)
2011–2012	Sambonifacese	5	(0)
2012–2013	Agropoli	11	(0)
2013–2014	Picciola	2	(0)

International career
2006-2008	Ivory Coast	2	(1)

Managerial career
- 2016-2017: Valdiano
- 2017-2018: Spezzano Albanese
- * Club domestic league appearances and goals

Christian José Manfredini Sisostri (born 1 May 1975) is an Ivorian retired footballer who played as a left midfielder or left winger. Manfredini also holds Italian citizenship, having been raised in Battipaglia, Italy.

== Personal life ==
Christian Manfredini was born Christian José Sisostri in Ivory Coast. At the age of 4, he was adopted by an Italian family with the surname Manfredini from Battipaglia, in the province of Salerno.

== Club career ==
=== Cosenza ===
A versatile midfielder, Manfredini is a product of the Juventus youth system and spent the early years of his career sent on loan by Juve to smaller clubs. Manfredini spent four seasons with different sides, playing in both Serie C1 and C2 until he was sent to Cosenza in 1998, where he made his debut in Serie B at the age of 23.

=== Genoa ===
In 1999, after a year with Cosenza, Manfredini joined Genoa, for 700 million lire or €361,520 (50% rights), also in Serie B at the time. After just a season with Genoa, Manfredini then joined a club which was making its way forward on the Italian football scene. Genoa bought the residual rights from Juventus for 600 million lire and resold Manfredini in the summer 2000.

=== Chievo ===
In 2000, Manfredini joined Chievo, and was an important part of the first-ever Chievo side to reach Serie A, along with Eriberto, who formed the "back arrow" as both wings. The team continued to surprise as they found themselves top of Serie A, eventually finishing fifth and achieving a UEFA Cup place.

=== Lazio ===
Manfredini did not stay any longer though as he had caught the eye of giants Lazio, who he joined in 2002 in a co-ownership deal for €6.715 million or 13 billion lire (10 billion lire cash (€5.165 million cash) plus half of the registration rights of Pesaresi tagged for €1.549 million or 3 billion lire). Lazio later write-down the value of Manfredini to €2.3 million, after both club withdrew the remain 50% registration rights. At first, Manfredini failed to break into the strong Lazio side and was sent on loan to Osasuna in Spain, as well as Perugia and Fiorentina.

In 2004, Lazio went into a financial meltdown and were forced to sell many of their top players. Manfredini was recalled to the team and, while not always a regular in the first eleven, made many appearances for the capital club.

Manfredini also scored a goal in the UEFA Champions League against German side SV Werder Bremen. Manfredini did not play any game in 2009–10 Serie A and 2010–11 Serie A. His contract was extended for 5 years on 1 July 2006.

His contract with Lazio expired in June 2011 and was not renewed.

=== Sambonifacese ===
He has signed with AC Sambonifacese on 16 July 2011 and has played 11 games in the season 2011–12.

=== Agropoli ===
In the season 2012–13, he played for a newly promoted team in Serie D.

=== Picciola ===
In the season 2013-2014, he played for Picciola.

== International career ==
In 2006, Manfredini was handed his maiden national team callup by his country of birth, Ivory Coast. On 1 March 2006, Manfredini was selected for the squad to face Spain in a friendly match; however remained an unused substitute. He was not selected for the 2006 FIFA World Cup. Manfredini was called up again for the friendly match against Senegal on 16 August 2006, but did not get to play either. In November 2008, Ivory Coast's new manager, Bosnian Vahid Halilhodžić, gave Manfredini a recall to the national side for the friendly game against Israel, in which Manfredini was finally able to make his official debut for the Ivorian national team.

== Honours ==
Lazio

- Coppa Italia: 2008–09
- Supercoppa Italiana: 2009
