= Lorenzo D'Anna =

Italian footballer and manager

Personal information
- Full name: Lorenzo D'Anna
- Date of birth: 29 January 1972 (age 54)
- Place of birth: Oggiono, Italy
- Height: 1.81 m (5 ft 11 in)
- Position: Centre-back

Youth career
- 1989–1990: Como

Senior career*
Years	Team	Apps	(Gls)
1990–1992	Como	8	(1)
1991–1992	→ Pro Sesto (on loan)	27	(1)
1992–1994	Fiorentina	10	(0)
1994–2007	Chievo	355	(18)
2007	Piacenza	15	(0)
2008	Treviso	12	(0)

Managerial career
- 2013: Südtirol
- 2018: Chievo
- 2022: Trento
- * Club domestic league appearances and goals

Lorenzo D'Anna (born 29 January 1972) is an Italian football manager and former player, last in charge as head coach of Serie C club Trento.

== Playing career ==
D'Anna was a centre back, and was the captain of A.C. ChievoVerona of Serie A, with over 300 matches played for the flying donkeys. He played for Chievo from 1994 to 2007.

Before joining Chievo, D'Anna also played for Como, Pro Sesto and Fiorentina.

== Coaching career ==
On 9 July 2013 he was appointed manager of Südtirol in Lega Pro Prima Divisione; and sacked the next October.

On 29 April 2018, he was promoted as head coach of Chievo after the sacking of Rolando Maran.

On 27 March 2022, D'Anna returned to management as the new head coach of Serie C club Trento. After completing the season and saving the club from relegation, he was confirmed in charge of the club for the 2022–23 season, but was sacked on 9 October 2022 due to negative results.
