= 2001–02 Serie A =

100th season of top-tier Italian football

Serie A
- Season: 2001–02
- Dates: 25 August 2001 – 5 May 2002
- Champions: Juventus; 26th title
- Relegated: Hellas Verona; Lecce; Fiorentina (to C2); Venezia
- Champions League: Juventus; Roma; Internazionale; Milan
- UEFA Cup: Chievo; Lazio; Parma
- Intertoto Cup: Bologna; Perugia; Torino
- Matches: 306
- Goals: 806 (2.63 per match)
- Top goalscorer: Dario Hübner; David Trezeguet (24 goals each)
- Biggest home win: Lazio 5–0 Brescia (4 November 2001); Lazio 5–0 Perugia (20 January 2002); Piacenza 5–0 Venezia (17 February 2002); Juventus 5–0 Brescia (28 April 2002); Roma 5–0 Chievo (28 April 2002)
- Biggest away win: Atalanta 1–5 Udinese (21 October 2001); Lazio 1–5 Roma (10 March 2002)
- Highest scoring: Lazio 5–4 Hellas Verona (21 April 2002)
- Longest unbeaten run: Roma; 24 games
- Longest winless run: Venezia; 13 games
- Average attendance: 25,992

The 2001–02 Serie A (known as the Serie A TIM for sponsorship reasons) was the 100th season of top-tier Italian football, the 70th in a round-robin tournament. It was composed by 18 teams, for the 14th consecutive time from season 1988–89.

The first two teams qualified directly to the UEFA Champions League, teams ending in the third and fourth places had to play Champions League qualifications, teams ending in the fifth and sixth places qualified for the UEFA Cup (another spot was given to the winner of Coppa Italia), while the last four teams were to be relegated to Serie B. However, Fiorentina's subsequent bankruptcy led to them being placed in the fourth tier of Italian football.

Juventus won its 26th title on the final day of the season after original leaders Internazionale (who finished third) lost 4–2 away to Lazio, and with it their chance at winning their first Scudetto since 1989. Second place went to Roma.

This season also featured Chievo's "miracle". The club, newly promoted to Serie A for the first time, were top of the table for six weeks early in the season. However, after the Christmas break, they hit some bad form and finished the season in fifth place.

Eighteen teams competed in the league, with four promoted teams from Serie B, Torino, Piacenza, Chievo and Venezia, replacing the four relegated teams from the 2000–01 Serie A season, Reggina, Vicenza, Napoli and Bari.

== Personnel and sponsoring ==
2001–02 Serie A team distribution

Team	Head coach	Kit manufacturer	Shirt sponsor
Atalanta	(Italy) Giovanni Vavassori	Asics	Ortobell
Bologna	(Italy) Francesco Guidolin	Macron	Area Banca
Brescia	(Italy) Carlo Mazzone	Garman	Banca Lombarda
Chievo*	(Italy) Luigi Delneri	Joma	Paluani
Fiorentina	(Italy) Luciano Chiarugi	Mizuno	Toyota
Hellas Verona	(Italy) Alberto Malesani	Lotto	Amica Chips
Internazionale	(Argentina) Héctor Cúper	Nike	Pirelli
Juventus	(Italy) Marcello Lippi	Lotto	Fastweb/Tu Mobile (in UEFA matches)
Lazio	(Italy) Alberto Zaccheroni	Puma	Siemens Mobile
Lecce	(Italy) Delio Rossi	Asics	Banca 121
Milan	(Italy) Carlo Ancelotti	Adidas	Opel
Parma	(Italy) Pietro Carmignani	Champion	Parmalat/Santàl (in UEFA matches)
Perugia	(Italy) Serse Cosmi	Galex	Daewoo
Piacenza*	(Italy) Walter Novellino	Lotto	Publitel
Roma	(Italy) Fabio Capello	Kappa	INA Assitalia
Torino*	(Italy) Giancarlo Camolese	Asics	Conto Arancio
Udinese	(Italy) Giampiero Ventura	Diadora	Ristora
Venezia*	(Italy) Alfredo Magni	Kelme	Emmezeta

(*) Promoted from Serie B.

== Managerial changes ==
Team	Outgoing manager	Manner of departure	Date of vacancy	Incoming manager	Date of appointment	Position in table
Juventus	(Italy) Carlo Ancelotti	End of contract	30 June 2001	(Italy) Marcello Lippi	1 July 2001	Pre-season
Hellas Verona	(Italy) Attilio Perotti	End of contract	30 June 2001	(Italy) Alberto Malesani	1 July 2001	Pre-season
Udinese	(Italy) Luciano Spalletti	End of contract	30 June 2001	(England) Roy Hodgson	1 July 2001	Pre-season
Milan	(Italy) Cesare Maldini	Resigned	30 June 2001	(Turkey) Fatih Terim	1 July 2001	Pre-season
Internazionale	(Italy) Marco Tardelli	Sacked	30 June 2001	(Argentina) Héctor Cúper	1 July 2001	Pre-season
Lazio	(Italy) Dino Zoff	Sacked	September 2001	(Italy) Alberto Zaccheroni	September 2001	14th
Venezia	(Italy) Cesare Prandelli	Sacked	October 2001	(Italy) Sergio Buso (caretaker)	October 2001	18th
Venezia	(Italy) Sergio Buso	End of caretaker spell	October 2001	(Italy) Alfredo Magni	October 2001	18th
Parma	(Italy) Renzo Ulivieri	Sacked	October 2001	(Italy) Pietro Carmignani (caretaker)	November 2001	14th
Parma	(Italy) Pietro Carmignani	End of caretaker spell	November 2001	(Argentina) Daniel Passarella	November 2001	11th
Milan	(Turkey) Fatih Terim	Sacked	November 2001	(Italy) Carlo Ancelotti	November 2001	5th
Udinese	(England) Roy Hodgson	Sacked	December 2001	(Italy) Giampiero Ventura	December 2001	9th
Parma	(Argentina) Daniel Passarella	Sacked	December 2001	(Italy) Pietro Carmignani	December 2001	17th
Fiorentina	(Italy) Roberto Mancini	Sacked	January 2002	(Italy) Luciano Chiarugi (caretaker)	January 2002	17th
Fiorentina	(Italy) Luciano Chiarugi	End of caretaker spell	January 2002	(Italy) Ottavio Bianchi	January 2002	17th
Lecce	(Italy) Alberto Cavasin	Sacked	January 2002	(Italy) Delio Rossi	January 2002	16th
Fiorentina	(Italy) Ottavio Bianchi	Sacked	April 2002	(Italy) Luciano Chiarugi	April 2002	17th

== League table ==
Pos	Team	Pld	W	D	L	GF	GA	GD	Pts	Qualification or relegation
1	Juventus (C)	34	20	11	3	64	23	+41	71	Qualification to Champions League first group stage
2	Roma	34	19	13	2	58	24	+34	70	Qualification to Champions League first group stage
3	Internazionale	34	20	9	5	62	35	+27	69	Qualification to Champions League third qualifying round
4	Milan	34	14	13	7	47	33	+14	55	Qualification to Champions League third qualifying round
5	Chievo	34	14	12	8	57	52	+5	54	Qualification to UEFA Cup first round
6	Lazio	34	14	11	9	50	37	+13	53	Qualification to UEFA Cup first round
7	Bologna	34	15	7	12	40	40	0	52	Qualification to Intertoto Cup third round
8	Perugia	34	13	7	14	38	46	−8	46	Qualification to Intertoto Cup third round
9	Atalanta	34	12	9	13	41	50	−9	45	
10	Parma (Note: Parma gained entry to the 2002–03 UEFA Cup as the 2001–02 Coppa Italia champions.)	34	12	8	14	43	47	−4	44	Qualification to UEFA Cup first round
11	Torino (Note: Torino gained entry to the 2002 UEFA Intertoto Cup after Atalanta declined to take part.)	34	10	13	11	37	39	−2	43	Qualification to Intertoto Cup second round
12	Piacenza	34	11	9	14	49	43	+6	42	
13	Brescia	34	9	13	12	43	52	−9	40 (Note: Brescia finished ahead of Udinese on head-to-head goal difference: Brescia 2–0 Udinese, Udinese 3–2 Brescia.)	
14	Udinese	34	11	7	16	41	52	−11	40	
15	Hellas Verona (R)	34	11	6	17	41	53	−12	39	Relegation to Serie B
16	Lecce (R)	34	6	10	18	36	56	−20	28	Relegation to Serie B
17	Fiorentina (Note: Fiorentina was denied entry to the 2002–03 Serie B season, having entered administration. It was later admitted to the Lega Professionisti Serie C after bankruptcy.) (R, E, R)	34	5	7	22	29	63	−34	22	Phoenix in Serie C2
18	Venezia (R)	34	3	9	22	30	61	−31	18	Relegation to Serie B

Source: 2001–02 Serie A, Soccerway
Rules for classification: 1) Points; 2) Head-to-head points; 3) Head-to-head goal difference; 4) Goal difference; 5) Goals scored; 6) Draw. (Note: Head-to-head record is used only after all the matches between the teams in question have been played).
(C) Champions; (E) Eliminated; (R) Relegated

== Results ==
Home \ Away	ATA	BOL	BRE	CHV	FIO	INT	JUV	LAZ	LCE	MIL	PAR	PER	PIA	ROM	TOR	UDI	VEN	HEL
Atalanta		2–2	0–0	1–2	2–0	2–4	0–2	0–1	2–1	1–1	4–1	2–1	1–1	1–1	1–1	1–5	1–0	1–0
Bologna	1–0		2–1	3–1	3–2	2–1	0–0	2–0	4–3	2–0	1–0	2–1	1–2	1–3	1–0	0–1	1–1	2–1
Brescia	3–3	3–0		2–2	3–0	1–3	0–4	1–1	1–1	2–2	1–4	3–0	2–2	0–0	1–2	2–0	3–2	0–0
Chievo	2–1	2–0	1–1		2–2	2–2	1–3	3–1	2–1	1–1	1–0	2–0	4–2	0–3	3–0	1–2	1–1	2–1
Fiorentina	3–1	1–1	1–0	0–2		0–1	1–1	0–1	1–2	1–1	1–2	1–3	1–3	2–2	0–0	0–0	3–1	0–2
Internazionale	1–2	1–0	2–1	1–2	2–0		2–2	0–0	2–0	2–4	2–0	4–1	3–1	3–1	0–0	3–2	2–1	3–0
Juventus	3–0	2–1	5–0	3–2	2–1	0–0		1–1	3–0	1–0	3–1	2–0	2–0	0–2	3–3	3–0	4–0	1–0
Lazio	2–0	2–2	5–0	1–1	3–0	4–2	1–0		1–0	1–1	0–0	5–0	1–1	1–5	0–0	2–0	4–2	5–4
Lecce	0–2	1–0	1–3	2–3	4–1	1–2	0–0	1–2		0–1	1–1	2–3	0–0	1–1	1–1	1–2	2–1	1–1
Milan	0–0	0–0	0–0	3–2	5–2	0–1	1–1	2–0	3–0		3–1	1–1	0–0	0–0	2–1	2–3	1–1	2–1
Parma	1–1	2–1	1–0	0–0	2–0	2–2	1–0	1–0	1–1	0–1		2–1	2–2	1–2	0–1	2–0	2–1	2–2
Perugia	2–0	1–0	1–1	2–2	2–0	0–2	0–4	0–0	2–1	3–1	2–1		1–0	0–0	2–0	1–2	2–0	3–1
Piacenza	1–2	2–0	0–1	2–2	3–0	2–3	0–1	1–0	1–2	0–1	2–3	2–0		2–0	3–1	1–2	5–0	3–0
Roma	3–1	3–1	0–0	5–0	2–1	0–0	0–0	2–0	5–1	1–0	3–1	1–0	2–0		1–0	1–1	1–0	3–2
Torino	1–2	1–1	1–3	2–2	1–0	0–1	2–2	1–0	1–1	1–0	1–0	1–0	1–1	0–1		3–1	1–2	5–1
Udinese	1–2	0–1	3–2	1–2	1–2	1–1	0–2	1–4	0–1	1–2	3–2	0–0	1–1	1–1	2–2		1–0	2–1
Venezia	0–1	0–1	1–2	0–0	2–0	1–1	1–2	0–0	1–1	1–4	3–4	0–2	2–3	2–2	1–1	2–1		0–1
Hellas Verona	3–1	0–1	2–0	3–2	1–2	0–3	2–2	3–1	2–1	1–2	1–0	1–1	1–0	1–1	0–1	1–0	1–0	

Source: lega-calcio.it (in Italian)
Legend: Blue = home team win; Yellow = draw; Red = away team win.

== Overall ==
- Most wins – Juventus and Internazionale (20)
- Fewest wins – Venezia (3)
- Most draws – Roma, Milan, Torino and Brescia (13)
- Fewest draws – Hellas Verona (6)
- Most losses – Fiorentina and Venezia (22)
- Fewest losses – Roma (2)
- Most goals scored – Juventus (64)
- Fewest goals scored – Fiorentina (29)
- Most goals conceded – Fiorentina (63)
- Fewest goals conceded – Juventus (23)

== Top goalscorers ==
Rank	Player	Club	Goals
1	(France) David Trezeguet	Juventus	24
1	(Italy) Dario Hübner	Piacenza	24
3	(Italy) Christian Vieri	Internazionale	22
4	(Italy) Marco Di Vaio	Parma	20
5	(Italy) Filippo Maniero	Venezia	18
6	(Italy) Alessandro Del Piero	Juventus	16
6	(Italy) Cristiano Doni	Atalanta	16
8	(Italy) Roberto Muzzi	Udinese	14
8	(Ukraine) Andriy Shevchenko	Milan	14
10	(Argentina) Hernán Crespo	Lazio	13
10	(Italy) Massimo Marazzina	Chievo	13
10	(Italy) Vincenzo Montella	Roma	13
10	(Italy) Luca Toni	Brescia	13
14	(Romania) Adrian Mutu	Hellas Verona	12
15	(Uruguay) Javier Chevantón	Lecce	11
15	(Italy) Roberto Baggio	Brescia	11

== Attendances ==
#	Football club	Home games	Average attendance
1	Internazionale	17	63,364
2	AS Roma	17	61,241
3	AC Milan	17	58,446
4	SS Lazio	17	43,080
5	Juventus	17	40,228
6	Bologna FC	17	23,646
7	Torino FC	17	20,582
8	Parma AC	17	18,463
9	Hellas Verona	17	18,348
10	Fiorentina	17	17,890
11	US Lecce	17	17,039
12	Atalanta BC	17	17,011
13	ChievoVerona	17	16,338
14	Udinese	17	16,314
15	Brescia Calcio	17	15,380
16	AC Perugia	17	10,917
17	Piacenza Calcio	17	9,671
18	AC Venezia	17	7,776
