= 2006–07 AC ChievoVerona season =

Chievo
2006–07 season
- Chairman: (Italy) Luca Campedelli
- Manager: (Italy) Giuseppe Pillon (until 16 October) (Italy) Luigi Delneri
- Serie A: 18th
- Coppa Italia: Quarter-finals
- UEFA Champions League: Third qualifying round
- Highest home attendance: 6,719
- Average home league attendance: 13,000 (vs. Ascoli)
Home colours	Away colours

During the 2006–07 A.C. ChievoVerona season, they competed in Serie A.

== First-team squad ==
Squad at end of season

Note: Flags indicate national team as defined under FIFA eligibility rules; some limited exceptions apply. Players may hold more than one non-FIFA nationality.

No.	Pos.	Nation	Player
1	GK	ITA	Vincenzo Sicignano
2	DF	ITA	Juri Breviario
3	DF	MNE	Ivan Fatić
4	DF	ITA	Andrea Mantovani
5	MF	BRA	Luciano
7	MF	ITA	Franco Semioli
8	MF	ITA	Federico Giunti
9	DF	BRA	César Prates
10	FW	ITA	Giuseppe Cozzolino
11	MF	ITA	Vincenzo Italiano
15	FW	NGA	Victor Obinna
16	MF	ITA	Michele Troiano
17	DF	ITA	Lorenzo D'Anna
18	GK	ITA	Lorenzo Squizzi
19	DF	ITA	Marco Malagò
20	MF	ITA	Michele Marcolini
21	MF	ITA	Paolo Sammarco
22	DF	ITA	Cesare Rickler
23	DF	ITA	Salvatore Lanna
24	FW	ITA	Federico Cossato
25	FW	ARG	Francisco Barilaro
26	DF	ITA	Giuseppe Scurto

No.	Pos.	Nation	Player
27	DF	ITA	Fabio Moro
29	DF	ITA	Davide Mandelli
31	FW	ITA	Sergio Pellissier
32	FW	ALB	Xhulian Rrudho
33	MF	ITA	Matteo Brighi
34	DF	ITA	Mattia Sanzi
35	DF	ITA	Gianni Schena
36	MF	ITA	Nicola Marconi
37	MF	ITA	Matteo Alberti
38	MF	ITA	Serafino Bruzzese
39	MF	ITA	Amedeo Calliari
40	GK	ITA	Alessio Zaninelli
41	DF	ITA	Nicolò Brighenti
42	MF	ITA	Alesandro Boggian
43	MF	ITA	Lorenzo Cecchi
44	MF	ITA	Alessio Raia
45	FW	BRA	Rodrigo
46	DF	ITA	Alberto Loddo
47	DF	ITA	Giovanni Marchese
55	MF	POL	Kamil Kosowski (on loan from Wisła Kraków)
81	FW	ALB	Erjon Bogdani
99	GK	ITA	Emanuele Concetti

=== Left club during season ===
Note: Flags indicate national team as defined under FIFA eligibility rules; some limited exceptions apply. Players may hold more than one non-FIFA nationality.

No.	Pos.	Nation	Player
3	MF	ITA	Filippo Antonelli (on loan to Pescara)
9	FW	ITA	Salvatore Bruno (to Modena)
10	MF	ITA	Andrea Zanchetta (to Lecce)
11	FW	BRA	Amauri (to Palermo)
14	MF	ITA	Stefano Garzon (on loan to Avellino)

No.	Pos.	Nation	Player
16	MF	ITA	Mattia Marchesetti (on loan to Triestina)
80	GK	ITA	Mattia Passarini (on loan to Cremonese)
90	FW	ITA	Simone Tiribocchi (on loan to Lecce)
99	FW	ITA	Denis Godeas (on loan to Mantova)

== Competitions ==
=== Serie A ===
Pos	Team	Pld	W	D	L	GF	GA	GD	Pts	Qualification or relegation
16	Torino	38	10	10	18	27	47	−20	40	
17	Cagliari	38	9	13	16	35	46	−11	40	
18	Chievo (R)	38	9	12	17	38	48	−10	39	Relegation to Serie B
19	Ascoli (R)	38	5	12	21	36	67	−31	27	Relegation to Serie B
20	Messina (R)	38	5	11	22	37	69	−32	26	Relegation to Serie B

Source: "Serie A 2006/2007 - 38. Round". worldfootball.net. 21 July 2025.
Rules for classification: 1) points; 2) goal difference; 3) number of goals scored.
(R) Relegated
