= 2011–12 AC ChievoVerona season =

Chievo
2011–12 season
- Owner: Luca Campedelli
- Chairman: Luca Campedelli
- Head Coach: Domenico Di Carlo

Associazione Calcio ChievoVerona (more commonly called ChievoVerona or simply Chievo) is currently competing in its 4th consecutive season in the Serie A.

== Serie A ==
| Pos | Team | Pld | W | D | L | GF | GA | GD | Pts |
|---|---|---|---|---|---|---|---|---|---|
| 8 | Parma | 38 | 15 | 11 | 12 | 54 | 53 | +1 | 56 (Note: Roma finished ahead of Parma on head–to–head away goals scored: Parma 0–1 Roma, Roma 1–0 Parma.) |
| 9 | Bologna | 38 | 13 | 12 | 13 | 41 | 43 | −2 | 51 |
| 10 | Chievo | 38 | 12 | 13 | 13 | 35 | 45 | −10 | 49 |
| 11 | Catania | 38 | 11 | 15 | 12 | 47 | 52 | −5 | 48 |
| 12 | Atalanta (Note: Atalanta were deducted 6 points due to involvement in the 2011–12 Italian football scandal.) | 38 | 13 | 13 | 12 | 41 | 43 | −2 | 46 (Note: Atalanta finished ahead of Fiorentina on head–to–head away goals scored: Atalanta 2–0 Fiorentina, Fiorentina 2–2 Atalanta.) |

Source: Lega Serie A
Rules for classification: 1) points; 2) head-to-head points; 3) head-to-head goal difference; 4) head-to-head goals scored; 5) goal difference; 6) number of goals scored

== Current squad ==
As of 26 August 2011

Note: Flags indicate national team as defined under FIFA eligibility rules; some limited exceptions apply. Players may hold more than one non-FIFA nationality.

| No. | Pos. | Nation | Player |
|---|---|---|---|
| 1 | GK | ITA | Jacopo Coletta |
| 3 | DF | ITA | Marco Andreolli |
| 4 | DF | ARG | Santiago Morero |
| 5 | DF | ITA | Davide Mandelli |
| 6 | MF | USA | Michael Bradley |
| 7 | MF | ITA | Paolo Sammarco (on loan from Sampdoria) |
| 8 | MF | PER | Rinaldo Cruzado |
| 9 | FW | ITA | Davide Moscardelli |
| 10 | MF | BRA | Luciano |
| 11 | MF | ITA | Marco Gallozzi (on loan from Padova) |
| 12 | DF | SVN | Boštjan Cesar |
| 13 | DF | SVN | Bojan Jokič |
| 15 | DF | ITA | Francesco Acerbi |
| 16 | MF | ITA | Luca Rigoni |
| 17 | GK | ITA | Christian Puggioni |

| No. | Pos. | Nation | Player |
|---|---|---|---|
| 18 | GK | ITA | Lorenzo Squizzi |
| 20 | DF | ITA | Gennaro Sardo |
| 21 | DF | FRA | Nicolas Frey |
| 23 | FW | ITA | Alberto Paloschi (on loan from Milan) |
| 25 | MF | CZE | Kamil Vacek |
| 26 | DF | CMR | Nestor Djengoue |
| 31 | FW | ITA | Sergio Pellissier (captain) |
| 39 | FW | ITA | Francesco Grandolfo (on loan from Bari) |
| 54 | GK | ITA | Stefano Sorrentino |
| 56 | MF | FIN | Përparim Hetemaj |
| 77 | FW | FRA | Cyril Théréau |
| 88 | MF | SUI | Simone Grippo |
| 90 | FW | COL | Fernando Uribe |
| 91 | FW | BUL | Radoslav Kirilov |
| 93 | DF | SEN | Boukary Dramé |

== Transfers ==
=== In ===
| Date | Pos. | Player | Moving from | Fee |
|---|---|---|---|---|
| 24 May 2011 | MF | (Guinea) Kévin Constant | (France) Châteauroux | Undisclosed^{[A]} |
| 22 June 2011 | GK | (Italy) Marco Silvestri | (Italy) Modena | Undisclosed |
| 30 June 2011 | MF | (Finland) Përparim Hetemaj | (Italy) Brescia | Undisclosed |
| 1 July 2011 | DF | (Italy) Francesco Acerbi | (Italy) Genoa | Undisclosed |
| 5 August 2011 | MF | (Peru) Rinaldo Cruzado | (Peru) Juan Aurich | Undisclosed |
| 5 August 2011 | FW | (Italy) Alberto Paloschi | (Italy) Milan | Loan |
| 23 August 2011 | DF | (Senegal) Boukary Dramé | (France) Sochaux | Free |
| 24 August 2011 | DF | (Italy) Paolo Sammarco | (Italy) Sampdoria | Loan |
| 25 August 2011 | GK | (Italy) Sergio Viotti | (Italy) Triestina | Undisclosed |
| 26 August 2011 | MF | (Czech Republic) Kamil Vacek | (Czech Republic) Sparta Prague | Undisclosed |
| 30 August 2011 | MF | (United States) Michael Bradley | (Germany) Mönchengladbach | Undisclosed |
| 31 August 2011 | FW | (Italy) Francesco Grandolfo | (Italy) Bari | Loan |
| 31 August 2011 | MF | (Italy) Marco Gallozzi | (Italy) Padova | Loan |

=== Out ===
| Date | Pos. | Player | Moving to | Fee |
|---|---|---|---|---|
| 23 June 2011 | DF | (Italy) Nicolò Brighenti | (Italy) Viareggio | Undisclosed |
| 28 June 2011 | DF | (Italy) Cesare Rickler | (Italy) Bologna | Undisclosed |
| 1 July 2011 | MF | (Guinea) Kévin Constant | (Italy) Genoa | Undisclosed^{[A]} |
| 6 July 2011 | DF | (Italy) Andrea Mantovani | (Italy) Palermo | Undisclosed |
| 8 August 2011 | DF | (Italy) Marco Malagò | (Italy) Lumezzane | Undisclosed |
| 18 August 2011 | DF | (Brazil) Rincón | (France) Troyes AC | Undisclosed |
| 24 August 2011 | MF | (Italy) Bentivoglio | (Italy) Sampdoria | Loan |
| 28 August 2011 | MF | (Italy) Andrea De Falco | (Italy) Bari | Loan |
| 28 August 2011 | FW | (Italy) Marcos de Paula | (Italy) Bari | Loan |
| 31 August 2011 | DF | (Montenegro) Ivan Fatić | (Italy) Empoli | Loan |
| 31 August 2011 | GK | (Italy) Sergio Viotti | (Italy) Triestina | Loan |

== Notes ==
^{1} Chievo got full ownership of Constant and then sold him to Genoa.
