= 2012–13 AC ChievoVerona season =

Chievo
2012–13 season
- Serie A: 12th
- Coppa Italia: Fourth round
- Top goalscorer: League: Cyril Théréau (11); All: Cyril Théréau (13)

The 2012–13 A.C. ChievoVerona season was the club's fifth consecutive season in Serie A.

== Players ==
As of 3 November 2012

Note: Flags indicate national team as defined under FIFA eligibility rules; some limited exceptions apply. Players may hold more than one non-FIFA nationality.

No.	Pos.	Nation	Player
1	GK	(Italy) ITA	Christian Puggioni
2	DF	(Italy) ITA	Dario Dainelli
3	DF	(Italy) ITA	Marco Andreolli
4	DF	(Greece) GRE	Nikos Spyropoulos
5	MF	(Italy) ITA	Roberto Guana
7	MF	(Chile) CHI	Felipe Seymour (on loan from Genoa)
10	MF	(Brazil) BRA	Luciano
11	FW	(Mali) MLI	Mamadou Samassa
12	DF	(Slovenia) SVN	Boštjan Cesar
13	DF	(Slovenia) SVN	Bojan Jokić
14	MF	(Ghana) GHA	Isaac Cofie
16	MF	(Italy) ITA	Luca Rigoni (vice-captain)
17	DF	(Italy) ITA	Mario Sampirisi (on loan from Genoa)
18	GK	(Italy) ITA	Lorenzo Squizzi

No.	Pos.	Nation	Player
20	DF	(Italy) ITA	Gennaro Sardo
21	DF	(France) FRA	Nicolas Frey
25	MF	(Czech Republic) CZE	Kamil Vacek
26	DF	(Slovakia) SVK	Pavol Farkaš
27	FW	(Argentina) ARG	Gabriel Hauche (on loan from (Argentina) Racing Club)
31	FW	(Italy) ITA	Sergio Pellissier (captain)
33	DF	(Romania) ROU	Paul Papp
39	MF	(Romania) ROU	Adrian Stoian
43	FW	(Italy) ITA	Alberto Paloschi (on loan from Milan)
51	DF	(Italy) ITA	Francesco Acerbi (on loan from Genoa)
56	MF	(Finland) FIN	Përparim Hetemaj
77	FW	(France) FRA	Cyril Théréau
88	GK	(Albania) ALB	Samir Ujkani (on loan from Palermo)
93	DF	(Senegal) SEN	Boukary Dramé
—	DF	(Bulgaria) BUL	Hristo Popadiyn (on loan from (Bulgaria) Levski)

=== Out on loan ===
Note: Flags indicate national team as defined under FIFA eligibility rules; some limited exceptions apply. Players may hold more than one non-FIFA nationality.

No.	Pos.	Nation	Player
2	DF	(Argentina) ARG	Santiago Morero (at Cesena)
11	FW	(Brazil) BRA	Marcos de Paula (at Vercelli)
23	GK	(Italy) ITA	Sergio Viotti (at Cremonese)
50	DF	(Italy) ITA	Alessandro Bassoli (at Südtirol)
—	GK	(Italy) ITA	Marco Silvestri (at Padova)
—	DF	(Italy) ITA	Amedeo Benedetti (at Pisa)
—	DF	(Cameroon) CMR	Nestor Djengoue (at (Croatia) NK Zagreb)
—	DF	(Montenegro) MNE	Ivan Fatić (at Lecce)
—	DF	(Croatia) CRO	Luka Tomaš (at Viareggio)
—	DF	(Italy) ITA	Massimo Zamparo (at Lumezzane)
—	MF	(Brazil) BRA	Lucas Finazzi (at Brescia)

No.	Pos.	Nation	Player
—	MF	(Italy) ITA	Nicola Rigoni (at Vicenza)
—	MF	(Italy) ITA	Salvatore Gallo (at Lumezzane)
—	MF	(Italy) ITA	Jordan Pedrocchi (at Chieti)
—	FW	(Italy) ITA	Valerio Anastasi (at Santarcangelo)
—	FW	(Brazil) BRA	Diego Farias (at Padova)
—	FW	(Italy) ITA	Roberto Inglese (at Lumezzane)
—	FW	(Italy) ITA	Antimo Iunco (at Bari)
—	FW	(Bulgaria) BUL	Radoslav Kirilov (at Lumezzane)
—	FW	(Italy) ITA	Andrea La Selva (at Chieti)
—	FW	(Senegal) SEN	Amadou Samb (at Lumezzane)
—	FW	(Italy) ITA	Davide Tonani (at Fano)

== Matches ==
=== Legend ===
Win Draw Loss Postponed

=== Serie A ===
==== Matches ====
26 August 2012 1	Chievo	2 – 0	Bologna	Verona
	Pellissier 65'; Cruzado 79'			Stadium: Stadio Marc'Antonio Bentegodi; Attendance: 11,000; Referee: Giampaolo Calvarese

2 September 2012 2	Parma	2 – 0	Chievo	Parma
	Belfodil 32'; Rosi 86'			Stadium: Stadio Ennio Tardini; Attendance: 14,000; Referee: Davide Massa

16 September 2012 3	Chievo	1 – 3	Lazio	Verona
	Pellissier 86' (pen.)		Hernanes 5', 74'; Klose 37'	Stadium: Stadio Marc'Antonio Bentegodi; Attendance: 11,000; Referee: Nicola Rizzoli

22 September 2012 4	Juventus	2 – 0	Chievo	Turin
	Quagliarella 64', 68'			Stadium: Juventus Stadium; Attendance: 38,369; Referee: Carmine Russo

26 September 2012 5	Chievo	0 – 2	Inter	Verona
			Pereira 43'; Cassano 74'	Stadium: Stadio Marc'Antonio Bentegodi; Attendance: 10,000; Referee: Sebastiano Peruzzo

30 September 2012 6	Palermo	4 – 1	Chievo	Palermo
	Miccoli 13', 59', 82'; Giorgi 80'		M. Rigoni 28'	Stadium: Stadio Renzo Barbera; Attendance: 12,411; Referee: Mauro Bergonzi

6 October 2012 7	Chievo	2 – 1	Sampdoria	Verona
	Théréau 45'; Di Michele 87'		Maresca 61'	Stadium: Stadio Marc'Antonio Bentegodi; Attendance: 10,000; Referee: Andrea Gervasoni

21 October 2012 8	Chievo	1 – 1	Fiorentina	Verona
	Théréau 17'		Rodríguez 18'	Stadium: Stadio Marc'Antonio Bentegodi; Attendance: 9,500; Referee: Marco Guida

28 October 2012 9	Napoli	1 – 0	Chievo	Naples
	Hamšík 58'			Stadium: Stadio San Paolo; Attendance: 25,000; Referee: Domenico Celi

31 October 2012 10	Chievo	2 – 0	Pescara	Verona
	Luciano 75' (pen.); Stoian 77'			Stadium: Stadio Marc'Antonio Bentegodi; Attendance: 9,500; Referee: Emilio Ostinelli

3 November 2012 11	Milan	5 – 1	Chievo	Milan
	Emanuelson 16'; Montolivo 36'; Bojan 41'; El Shaarawy 75'; Pazzini 90'		Pellissier 18'	Stadium: San Siro; Attendance: 49,000; Referee: Piero Giacomelli

11 November 2012 12	Chievo	2 – 2	Udinese	Verona
	Andreolli 39'; Paloschi 89' (pen.)		Angella 42', 90+2'	Stadium: Stadio Marc'Antonio Bentegodi; Attendance: 9,500; Referee: Daniele Doveri

18 November 2012 13	Catania	2 – 1	Chievo	Catania
	Almirón 51', 85'		Andreolli 90'	Stadium: Stadio Angelo Massimino; Attendance: 14,000; Referee: Sebastiano Peruzzo

25 November 2012 14	Chievo	0 – 0	Siena	Verona
				Stadium: Stadio Marc'Antonio Bentegodi; Attendance: 9,500; Referee: Davide Massa

2 December 2012 15	Genoa	2 – 4	Chievo	Genoa
	Said 40'; Janković 56'		Paloschi 14' (pen.), 22', 45'; Stoian 89'	Stadium: Stadio Luigi Ferraris; Attendance: 17,000; Referee: Paolo Tagliavento

9 December 2012 16	Cagliari	0 – 2	Chievo	Quartu Sant'Elena
			Paloschi 67'; Théréau 87'	Stadium: Stadio Is Arenas; Attendance: 9,000; Referee: Carmine Russo

16 December 2012 17	Chievo	1 – 0	Roma	Verona
	Pellissier 87'			Stadium: Stadio Marc'Antonio Bentegodi; Attendance: 9,000; Referee: Mauro Bergonzi

22 December 2012 18	Torino	2 – 0	Chievo	Turin
	Sardo 12' (o.g.); Gazzi 26'			Stadium: Stadio Olimpico di Torino; Attendance: 15,000; Referee: Luca Banti

6 January 2013 19	Chievo	1 – 0	Atalanta	Verona
	Cofie 37'			Stadium: Stadio Marc'Antonio Bentegodi; Attendance: 9,000; Referee: Maurizio Mariani

12 January 2013 20	Bologna	4 – 0	Chievo	Bologna
	Kone 13'; Gilardino 44', 59'; Gabbiadini 89'			Stadium: Stadio Renato Dall'Ara; Attendance: 20,155; Referee: Davide Massa

20 January 2013 21	Chievo	1 – 1	Parma	Verona
	Paloschi 57'		Belfodil 40'	Stadium: Stadio Marc'Antonio Bentegodi; Attendance: 9,500; Referee: Giampaolo Calvarese

26 January 2013 22	Lazio	0 – 1	Chievo	Rome
			Paloschi 61'	Stadium: Stadio Olimpico; Attendance: 30,000; Referee: Piero Giacomelli

3 February 2013 23	Chievo	1 – 2	Juventus	Verona
	Théréau 52'		Matri 10'; Lichtsteiner 42'	Stadium: Stadio Marc'Antonio Bentegodi; Attendance: 9,500; Referee: Mauro Bergonzi

10 February 2013 24	Inter	3 – 1	Chievo	Milan
	Cassano 2'; Ranocchia 26'; Milito 50'		L. Rigoni 21'	Stadium: San Siro; Attendance: 42,000; Referee: Marco Guida

16 February 2013 25	Chievo	1 – 1	Palermo	Verona
	Théréau 55' (pen.)		Formica 5'	Stadium: Stadio Marc'Antonio Bentegodi; Attendance: 10,000; Referee: Paolo Tagliavento

24 February 2013 26	Sampdoria	2 – 0	Chievo	Genoa
	Poli 33'; Éder 83'			Stadium: Stadio Luigi Ferraris; Attendance: 23,000; Referee: Eugenio Abbattista

3 March 2013 27	Fiorentina	2 – 1	Chievo	Florence
	Pasqual 5'; Larrondo 78'		Cofie 38'	Stadium: Stadio Artemio Franchi; Attendance: 24,000; Referee: Daniele Doveri

10 March 2013 28	Chievo	2 – 0	Napoli	Verona
	Dramé 12'; Théréau 43'			Stadium: Stadio Marc'Antonio Bentegodi; Attendance: 12,000; Referee: Gianluca Rocchi

17 March 2013 29	Pescara	0 – 2	Chievo	Pescara
			Stoian 88'; Théréau 90'	Stadium: Stadio Adriatico; Attendance: 8,308; Referee: Paolo Silvio Mazzoleni

30 March 2013 30	Chievo	0 – 1	Milan	Verona
			Montolivo 25'	Stadium: Stadio Marc'Antonio Bentegodi; Attendance: 20,000; Referee: Domenico Celi

7 April 2013 31	Udinese	3 – 1	Chievo	Udine
	Di Natale 20', 25'; Benatia 85'		Papp 35'	Stadium: Stadio Friuli; Attendance: 16,000; Referee: Antonio Damato

14 April 2013 32	Chievo	0 – 0	Catania	Verona
				Stadium: Stadio Marc'Antonio Bentegodi; Attendance: 10,000; Referee: Piero Giacomelli

21 April 2013 33	Siena	0 – 1	Chievo	Siena
			Pellissier 45'	Stadium: Stadio Artemio Franchi; Attendance: 9,500; Referee: Paolo Valeri

28 April 2013 34	Chievo	0 – 1	Genoa	Verona
			Borriello 73'	Stadium: Stadio Marc'Antonio Bentegodi; Attendance: 10,000; Referee: Daniele Doveri

4 May 2013 35	Chievo	0 – 0	Cagliari	Verona
				Stadium: Stadio Marc'Antonio Bentegodi; Attendance: 11,000; Referee: Riccardo Pinzani

7 May 2013 36	Roma	0 – 1	Chievo	Rome
			Théréau 90'	Stadium: Stadio Olimpico; Attendance: 34,620; Referee: Sebastiano Peruzzo

12 May 2013 37	Chievo	1 – 1	Torino	Verona
	Théréau 10'		Cerci 19' (pen.)	Stadium: Stadio Marc'Antonio Bentegodi; Attendance: 11,000; Referee: Paolo Valeri

19 May 2013 38	Atalanta	2 – 2	Chievo	Bergamo
	Stendardo 8'; Giorgi 85'		Théréau 76', 90'	Stadium: Stadio Atleti Azzurri d'Italia; Attendance: 15,000; Referee: Federico La Penna

=== Coppa Italia ===
18 August 2012 Third round	Chievo	4 – 0	Ascoli	Verona
19:00 CEST (UTC+02:00)	Théréau 5', 27'; Pellissier 10'; Di Michele 52'			Stadium: Stadio Marc'Antonio Bentegodi; Referee: Andrea Gervasoni

28 November 2012 Fourth round	Chievo	0 – 1	Reggina	Verona
15:00 CET (UTC+01:00)		Report	Lucioni 60'	Stadium: Stadio Marc'Antonio Bentegodi; Referee: Piero Giacomelli

== Statistics ==
=== Appearances and goals ===
No.	Pos	Nat	Player	Total		Serie A		Coppa Italia	
No.	Pos	Nat	Player	Apps	Goals	Apps	Goals	Apps	Goals
Goalkeepers
1	GK	(Italy) ITA	Christian Puggioni	18	0	17	0	1	0
18	GK	(Italy) ITA	Lorenzo Squizzi	1	0	1	0	0	0
88	GK	(Albania) ALB	Samir Ujkani	0	0	0	0	0	0
Defenders
2	DF	(Italy) ITA	Dario Dainelli	35	0	34	0	1	0
3	DF	(Italy) ITA	Marco Andreolli	28	2	28	2	0	0
4	DF	(Greece) GRE	Nikos Spyropoulos	2	0	0+2	0	0	0
12	DF	(Slovenia) SVN	Boštjan Cesar	23	0	19+3	0	1	0
13	DF	(Slovenia) SVN	Bojan Jokić	21	0	13+7	0	1	0
17	DF	(Italy) ITA	Mario Sampirisi	3	0	3	0	0	0
20	DF	(Italy) ITA	Gennaro Sardo	25	0	18+5	0	2	0
21	DF	(France) FRA	Nicolas Frey	22	0	20+1	0	1	0
26	DF	(Slovakia) SVK	Pavol Farkaš	5	0	2+2	0	1	0
33	DF	(Romania) ROU	Paul Papp	9	1	6+2	1	0+1	0
51	DF	(Italy) ITA	Francesco Acerbi	7	0	5+2	0	0	0
93	DF	(Senegal) SEN	Boukary Dramé	23	1	21+1	1	0+1	0
Midfielders
5	MF	(Italy) ITA	Roberto Guana	24	0	22+1	0	0+1	0
7	MF	(Chile) CHI	Felipe Seymour	7	0	3+4	0	0	0
10	MF	(Brazil) BRA	Luciano	24	1	12+12	1	0	0
14	MF	(Ghana) GHA	Isaac Cofie	28	2	23+4	2	1	0
16	MF	(Italy) ITA	Luca Rigoni	32	1	31	1	1	0
25	MF	(Czech Republic) CZE	Kamil Vacek	12	0	7+4	0	1	0
39	MF	(Romania) ROU	Adrian Stoian	21	3	7+13	3	0+1	0
56	MF	(Finland) FIN	Përparim Hetemaj	30	0	28+2	0	0	0
Forwards
11	FW	(Mali) MLI	Mamadou Samassa	9	0	1+7	0	1	0
27	FW	(Argentina) ARG	Gabriel Hauche	1	0	0+1	0	0	0
31	FW	(Italy) ITA	Sergio Pellissier	25	6	13+11	5	1	1
43	FW	(Italy) ITA	Alberto Paloschi	20	7	16+4	7	0	0
77	FW	(France) FRA	Cyril Théréau	38	13	35+2	11	1	2
Players transferred out during the season
6	MF	(Italy) ITA	Marco Rigoni	12	1	4+6	1	2	0
8	MF	(Peru) PER	Rinaldo Cruzado	6	1	1+4	1	0+1	0
9	FW	(Italy) ITA	Davide Moscardelli	9	0	1+6	0	1+1	0
17	FW	(Italy) ITA	David Di Michele	13	2	6+5	1	2	1
54	GK	(Italy) ITA	Stefano Sorrentino	21	0	20	0	1	0

Last updated: 28 October 2012
Source: Competitions

=== Top scorers ===
This includes all competitive matches. The list is sorted by shirt number when total goals are equal.

R	No.	Pos	Nat	Name	Serie A	Coppa Italia	Total
1	77	FW	(France)	Cyril Théréau	11	2	13
2	43	FW	(Italy)	Alberto Paloschi	7	0	7
3	31	FW	(Italy)	Sergio Pellissier	5	1	6
4	39	MF	(Romania)	Adrian Stoian	3	0	3
5	3	DF	(Italy)	Marco Andreolli	2	0	2
=	14	MF	(Ghana)	Isaac Cofie	2	0	2
=	17	FW	(Italy)	David Di Michele	1	1	2
8	6	MF	(Italy)	Marco Rigoni	1	0	1
=	8	MF	(Peru)	Rinaldo Cruzado	1	0	1
=	10	MF	(Brazil)	Luciano	1	0	1
=	16	MF	(Italy)	Luca Rigoni	1	0	1
=	33	DF	(Romania)	Paul Papp	1	0	1
=	93	DF	(Senegal)	Boukary Dramé	1	0	1

Last updated: 28 October 2012
Source: Competitions
