= Puggioni =

Puggioni is an Italian surname. Notable people with the surname include:

- Christian Puggioni (born 1981), Italian footballer
- Giovanni Puggioni (born 1966), Italian sprinter
