= Malagò =

Malagò is an Italian surname. Notable people with the surname include:

- Giovanni Malagò (born 1959), Italian businessman, sports manager, and futsal player
- Marco Malagò (born 1978), Italian footballer

== Geographical name ==
The River Malago was a former river in Bristol. It was a tributary of the River Avon, but it is nowadays culverted.
