= 2006–07 Reggina Calcio season =

Reggina
2006–07 season
- Chairman: Pasquale Foti
- Manager: Walter Mazzarri
- Serie A: 14th
- Coppa Italia: Last 16
- Top goalscorer: Rolando Bianchi (18)

Reggina Calcio was thought to be a prime candidate to be relegated in the 2006-07 season, since it had been deducted eleven points for its involvement in Calciopoli. At no stage had Reggina renewed its contract with more than a point or two, and therefore its 51 points in 38 games was a very high yield. The Serie A stay was extended thanks to the successful striking force of Rolando Bianchi and Nicola Amoruso, scoring an unprecedented 35 goals between them. Bianchi headed for Manchester City in the summer, and successful coach Walter Mazzarri found a new berth at Sampdoria.

== Squad ==
=== Goalkeepers ===
- (Italy) Ivan Pelizzoli (until January)
- (Italy) Pietro Marino
- (Serbia) Nenad Novaković
- (Italy) Andrea Campagnolo
- (Italy) Christian Puggioni

=== Defenders ===
- (Italy) Antonio Giosa
- (Italy) Palmiro Di Dio
- (Italy) Salvatore Aronica
- (Italy) Alessandro Lucarelli
- (Italy) Antonino Barillà
- (Italy) Francesco Modesto
- (Italy) Maurizio Lanzaro

=== Midfielders ===
- (Italy) Riccardo Nardini
- (Italy) Giovanni Morabito
- (Portugal) Ricardo Esteves
- (Italy) Luca Tognozzi
- (Argentina) Leonel Ríos
- (Italy) Alessandro Gazzi
- (Italy) Daniele Amerini
- (Italy) Giacomo Tedesco
- (Italy) Giandomenico Mesto
- (Italy) Ivan Castiglia
- (Italy) Filippo Carobbio
- (Italy) Luca Vigiani
- (Italy) Simone Missiroli
- (Italy) Pasquale Porcaro
- (Honduras) Julio León

=== Attackers ===
- (Italy) Rolando Bianchi
- (Italy) Nicola Amoruso
- (Italy) Pasquale Foggia
- (Denmark) Nicki Bille Nielsen
- (Albania) Henry Shiba

== Serie A ==
| Pos | Team | Pld | W | D | L | GF | GA | GD | Pts |
|---|---|---|---|---|---|---|---|---|---|
| 12 | Parma | 38 | 10 | 12 | 16 | 41 | 56 | −15 | 42 |
| 13 | Catania | 38 | 10 | 11 | 17 | 46 | 68 | −22 | 41 |
| 14 | Reggina (Note: Fiorentina were docked 15 points, Reggina 11 points, Milan 8 points and Lazio 3 points, all for involvement in the 2006 Italian football scandal.) | 38 | 12 | 15 | 11 | 52 | 50 | +2 | 40 |
| 15 | Siena (Note: Siena were given a one-point deduction for a delay in payment of social security contributions.) | 38 | 9 | 14 | 15 | 35 | 45 | −10 | 40 |
| 16 | Torino | 38 | 10 | 10 | 18 | 27 | 47 | −20 | 40 |

Rules for classification: 1) points; 2) goal difference; 3) number of goals scored.

=== Matches ===
- Palermo-Reggina 4-3
- 1-0 Mark Bresciano (11)
- 2-0 Giuseppe Biava (17)
- 3-0 Eugenio Corini (27 pen)
- 3-1 Rolando Bianchi (42)
- 3-2 Rolando Bianchi (55)
- 4-2 Amauri (67)
- 4-3 Rolando Bianchi (78 pen)
- Reggina-Cagliari 2-1
- 1-0 Alessandro Lucarelli (52)
- 1-1 David Suazo (62 pen)
- 2-1 Rolando Bianchi (90 + 3)
- Messina-Reggina 2-0
- 1-0 Christian Riganò (25)
- 2-0 Christian Riganò (85)
- Reggina-Torino 1-1
- 1-0 Francesco Modesto (56)
- 1-1 Gianluca Comotto (65)
- Atalanta-Reggina 1-1
- 1-0 Simone Loria (3)
- 1-1 Giacomo Tedesco (6)
- Reggina-Roma 1-0
- 1-0 Nicola Amoruso (49)
- Fiorentina-Reggina 3-0
- 1-0 Adrian Mutu (31)
- 2-0 Mario Santana (43)
- 3-0 Manuele Blasi (55)
- Reggina-Parma 3-2
- 1-0 Nicola Amoruso (33)
- 1-1 Igor Budan (39)
- 2-1 Rolando Bianchi (76)
- 3-1 Nicola Amoruso (78)
- 3-2 Andrea Gasbarroni (85)
- Lazio-Reggina 0-0
- Reggina-Catania 0-1
- 0-1 Giorgio Corona (69)
- Siena-Reggina 0-1
- 0-1 Rolando Bianchi (71 pen)
- Inter-Reggina 1-0
- 1-0 Hernán Crespo (4)
- Reggina-Livorno 2-2
- 0-1 Fabio Galante (22)
- 0-2 Cristiano Lucarelli (27)
- 1-2 Rolando Bianchi (66)
- 2-2 Julio León (78)
- Udinese-Reggina 1-1
- 0-1 Rolando Bianchi (35)
- 1-1 Vincenzo Iaquinta (69)
- Reggina-Ascoli 2-1
- 1-0 Alessandro Lucarelli (29)
- 2-0 Nicola Amoruso (78)
- 2-1 Marco Pecorari (84)
- Reggina-Sampdoria 0-1
- 0-1 Fabio Quagliarella (68)
- Chievo-Reggina 3-2
- 0-1 Nicola Amoruso (17)
- 1-1 Paolo Sammarco (27)
- 2-1 Federico Cossato (44)
- 2-2 Francesco Modesto (78)
- 3-2 Simone Tiribocchi (88)
- Reggina-Empoli 4-1
- 1-0 Julio León (4)
- 2-0 Nicola Amoruso (8)
- 3-0 Nicola Amoruso (27)
- 4-0 Rolando Bianchi (43)
- 4-1 Luca Saudati (67)
- Milan-Reggina 3-1
- 1-0 Andrea Pirlo (6)
- 2-0 Clarence Seedorf (35)
- 2-1 Rolando Bianchi (67)
- 3-1 Alberto Gilardino (78)
- Reggina-Palermo 0-0
- Cagliari-Reggina 0-2
- 0-1 Luca Vigiani (47)
- 0-2 Luca Vigiani (58)
- Torino-Reggina 1-2
- 0-1 Rolando Bianchi (48)
- 1-1 Gianluca Comotto (49)
- 1-2 Rolando Bianchi (58)
- Reggina-Atalanta 1-1
- 1-0 Nicola Amoruso (64)
- 1-1 Maurizio Lanzaro (75 og)
- Roma-Reggina 3-0
- 1-0 Francesco Tavano (55)
- 2-0 Philippe Mexès (65)
- 3-0 Christian Panucci (90)
- Reggina-Fiorentina 1-1
- 1-0 Pasquale Foggia (57)
- 1-1 Adrian Mutu (87 pen)
- Parma-Reggina 2-2
- 0-1 Rolando Bianchi (14)
- 1-1 Igor Budan (23)
- 1-2 Rolando Bianchi (40)
- 2-2 Giuseppe Rossi (90 + 7 pen)
- Reggina-Lazio 2-3
- 1-0 Giacomo Tedesco (26)
- 1-1 Christian Manfredini (45)
- 1-2 Goran Pandev (45 + 1)
- 2-2 Pasquale Foggia (65)
- 2-3 Stephen Makinwa (79)
- Catania-Reggina 1-4
- 0-1 Nicola Amoruso (57)
- 0-2 Pasquale Foggia (62)
- 0-3 Rolando Bianchi (85 pen)
- 0-4 Ricardo Esteves (88)
- 1-4 Fausto Rossini (90)
- Reggina-Siena 0-1
- 0-1 Valerio Bertotto (45 + 1)
- Reggina-Inter 0-0
- Livorno-Reggina 1-1
- 1-0 Cristiano Lucarelli (28)
- 1-1 Rolando Bianchi (31)
- Reggina-Messina 3-1
- 1-0 Rolando Bianchi (13)
- 1-1 Christian Riganò (27 pen)
- 2-1 Nicola Amoruso (54)
- 3-1 Nicola Amoruso (72 pen)
- Reggina-Udinese 1-1
- 0-1 Sulley Muntari (26)
- 1-1 Nicola Amoruso (84 pen)
- Ascoli-Reggina 2-3
- 1-0 Michele Fini (14)
- 1-1 Nicola Amoruso (24)
- 1-2 Nicola Amoruso (32)
- 1-3 Pasquale Foggia (54)
- 2-3 Massimo Bonanni (82)
- Sampdoria-Reggina 0-0
- Reggina-Chievo 1-1
- 0-1 Matteo Brighi (51)
- 1-1 Rolando Bianchi (53)
- Empoli-Reggina 3-3
- 1-0 Ighli Vannucchi (9)
- 2-0 Fabio Moro (22)
- 3-0 Luca Saudati (23)
- 3-1 Luca Vigiani (52)
- 3-2 Nicola Amoruso (56)
- 3-3 Nicola Amoruso (84 pen)
- Reggina-Milan 2-0
- 1-0 Nicola Amoruso (8)
- 2-0 Daniele Amerini (67)

=== Topscorers ===
- (Italy) Rolando Bianchi 18
- (Italy) Nicola Amoruso 17
- (Italy) Pasquale Foggia 4
- (Italy) Francesco Modesto 3
- (Italy) Luca Vigiani 3

== Sources ==
- RSSSF - Italy 2006/07
