= Emanuele Concetti =

Italian football goalkeeper (born 1978)

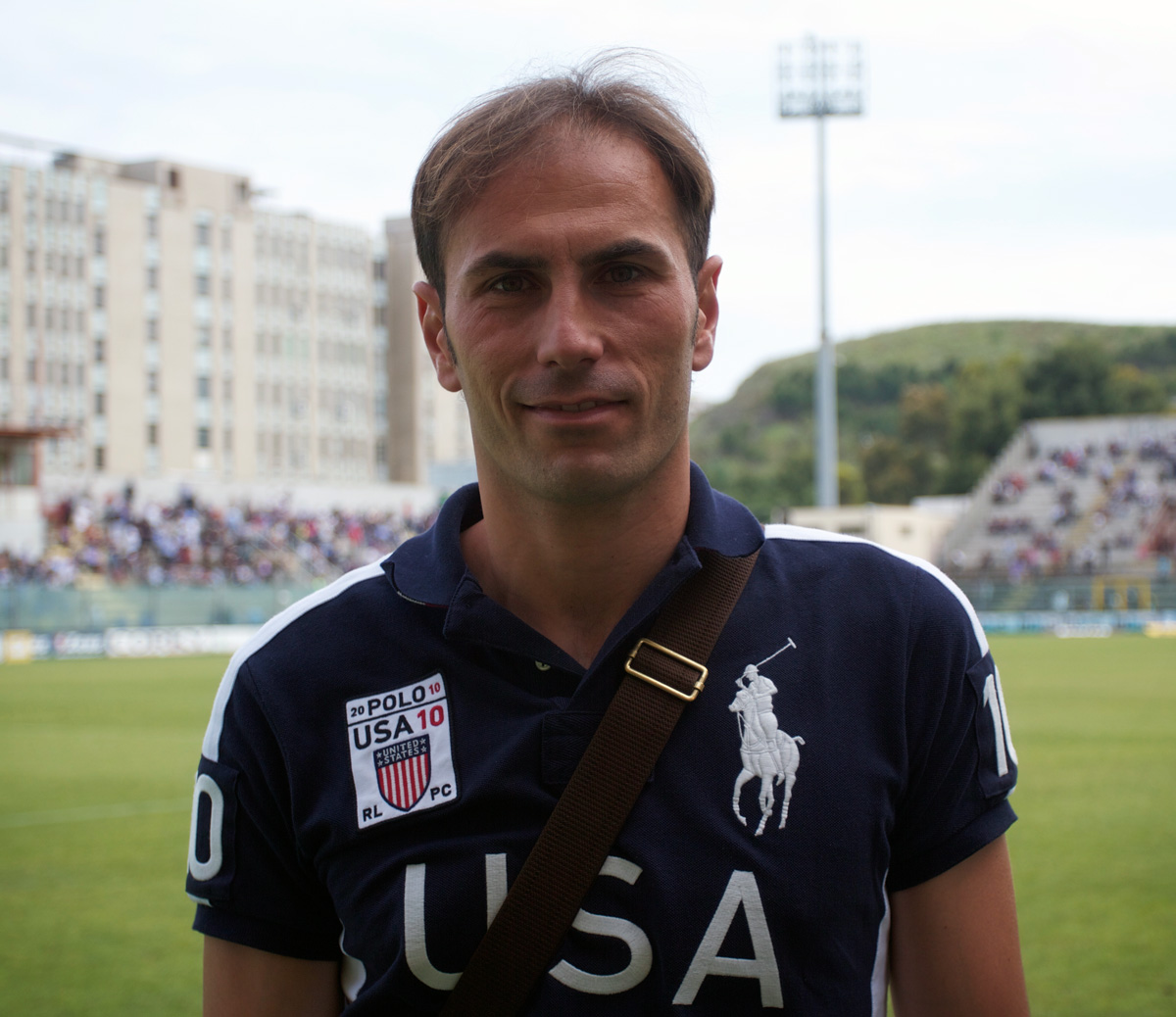

Personal information
- Date of birth: 6 March 1978 (age 48)
- Place of birth: Rome, Italy
- Height: 1.93 m (6 ft 4 in)
- Position: Goalkeeper

Team information
- Current team: Roma U-18 (GK coach)

Senior career*
Years	Team	Apps	(Gls)
1998–2003	Lazio	2	(0)
2000–2001	→ Arezzo (loan)	30	(0)
2003–2005	Perugia	0	(0)
2003–2004	→ Catania (loan)	12	(0)
2005	→ Lodigiani (loan)	21	(0)
2006	Sambenedettese	13	(0)
2006–2007	Monza	16	(0)
2007	→ Chievo (loan)	0	(0)
2007–2011	Crotone	97	(0)
2011–2012	Pergocrema	14	(0)
2012	→ Nocerina (loan)	21	(0)
2012–2015	Crotone	16	(0)
2015	Vigor Lamezia	0	(0)

Managerial career
- 2020–: Roma U-18 (GK coach)
- * Club domestic league appearances and goals

Emanuele Concetti (born 6 March 1978) is an Italian football coach and a former goalkeeper. He is the goalkeeping coach for the Under-18 squad of Roma.

== Career ==
Concetti started his professional career at Lazio. In mid-2000, he was loaned to Arezzo. During the 2002–03 season, he was initially a backup for Angelo Peruzzi and Luca Marchegiani, although he played once for Lazio in the UEFA Cup, against FC Red Star Belgrade.

In June 2003, he joined Perugia but loaned to Catania at the start of season, as Lorenzo Squizzi's backup. In January 2005, he left for Lodigiani and in January 2006 for Sambenedettese, replacing Antonio Rosati and compete the first choice with Domenico Di Dio. In mid-2006, he joined Monza of Serie C1, as the first choice goalkeeper, ahead Fabio Carrara. In January 2007, he was loaned to Chievo, replacing Mattia Passarini, again as Lorenzo Squizzi's backup. In mid-2007, he joined Crotone which he won promotion to Serie B in 2009. He lost his starting place to Vid Belec during 2010–11 Serie B and was released by Crotone in June 2011, which Giacomo Bindi succeeded his backup role.

== Honours ==
Lazio

- UEFA Cup Winners' Cup: 1998–99
- UEFA Super Cup: 1999
- Serie A: 1999–2000
- Coppa Italia: 1999–2000
- Supercoppa Italiana: 2000
