= Cyril Théréau =

French footballer (born 1983)

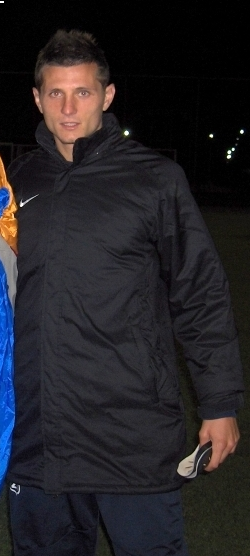
- Théréau in 2007

Personal information
- Date of birth: 24 April 1983 (age 43)
- Place of birth: Privas, France
- Height: 1.89 m (6 ft 2 in)
- Position: Striker

Youth career
- Laragne
- Gap

Senior career*
Years	Team	Apps	(Gls)
2004–2005	Orléans	10	(12)
2005–2006	Angers	46	(11)
2006	Charleroi	4	(3)
2006–2007	Steaua București	17	(10)
2007–2008	Anderlecht	11	(1)
2008–2010	Charleroi	62	(16)
2010–2014	Chievo	124	(26)
2014–2017	Udinese	108	(35)
2017–2020	Fiorentina	22	(5)
2019	→ Cagliari (loan)	5	(0)
Total		409	(119)
- * Club domestic league appearances and goals

Cyril Théréau (born 24 April 1983) is a French former professional footballer who played as a striker. He represented Orléans and Angers in France, Charleroi (two stints) and Anderlecht in Belgium, Steaua București in Romania, and Chievo, Udinese, Fiorentina and Cagliari in Italy.

== Career ==
=== Early career ===
At senior level, Théréau started playing for Gap FC in the "Honneur régional" league in France's seventh tier.

He joined fourth-tier side US Orléans in 2004 where he scored 12 goals in 10 matches.

=== Angers ===
After half a season with Orléans, he moved to Ligue 2 side Angers SCO in the winter transfer period. In his first professional match, a Coupe de France round of 32 tie at Stade Vélodrome on 8 January 2005, he netted the third goal as Angers won 3–2 against Marseille who at the time fielded Fabien Barthez in goal.

In his second season at Angers, with whom he had been relegated to the third-division Championnat National, he attained 8 goals in 29 league matches.

=== Charleroi ===
In summer 2006, Théréau joined Charleroi. Having bagged three goals in his first four matches, he left the club in the same transfer period.

=== FCSB ===
On 29 August 2006, Théréau signed a four-year contract with FCSB. The reported transfer fee paid to Charleroi was €1 million while Théréau's salary multiplied by seven to about €240,000 annually. The move happened after the Steaua's coach saw him play against Standard Liège and thought he could make a good replacement for the injured Victoraș Iacob. Months after playing in the Championnat National for Angers, Théréau made an appearance in the Champions League being substituted on in the 70th minute in Steaua's 1–4 win away to Dynamo Kyiv on 13 September 2006. He was used in all six matches in the group stage without scoring as FCSB failed to progress from the group which also included Real Madrid and Lyon. He scored his first hat-trick for FCSB in a win against FC Naţional in the Romanian top division on 12 November 2006. Théréau became a fan favourite at the club and this did not change when he was sent off in the Bucharest derby against Dinamo. In total, he amassed 10 goals in 17 leagues games.

=== Anderlecht ===
On 26 June 2007, Théréau agreed to a four-year deal with Belgian champions R.S.C. Anderlecht for a transfer fee of about €3 million.

=== Return to Charleroi ===
He returned to Charleroi on 14 January 2008, initially on loan. On 29 February 2008, he struck a brace against title contenders Club Brugge.

Charleroi secured Théréau's services permanently on 9 June 2008 on a three-year contract. On 10 March 2010, he reached a hat-trick in a 4–1 defeat of relegation rivals Lokeren – his club's first win of the year – which all but guaranteed Charleroi's Belgian Pro league status.

=== Chievo ===
On 24 August 2010, Théréau signed for Chievo Verona in the Italian Serie A. In October 2010, he scored his first goal against Cesena.

By the end of his spell with Chievo, having spent four seasons there, he had made 129 appearances in all competitions for the club and with 26 league goals he was the Chievo's most prolific foreign goalscorer of all time.

=== Udinese ===
During the 2014 summer transfer window, Théréau signed for Udinese Calcio on an annual salary of €700,000. In his first season, he scored 10 goals.

On 23 August 2015, he scored the decisive goal as Udinese beat Juventus 1–0. It was the first time in history Juventus lost on their home debut. He completed the 2015–16 season scoring 11 goals and contributing three assists in 36 league matches for his club.

=== Fiorentina ===
On 31 August 2017, Théréau signed a new contract with another Serie A club Fiorentina, after three years with Udinese.

==== Cagliari loan ====
On 31 January 2019, Théréau joined Cagliari on loan until 30 June 2019.

== Style of play ==
Théréau has skills for striking and positioning. During his tenure in the Belgian First Division, he was noted for a goal after dribbling from the middle of the pitch to the penalty box. He is a technical player.

== Career statistics ==
Appearances and goals by club, season and competition
Club	Season	League			Cup		Europe		Other		Total	
Club	Season	Division	Apps	Goals	Apps	Goals	Apps	Goals	Apps	Goals	Apps	Goals
Orléans	2004–05	CFA	10	12	0	0	0	0	–		10	12
Angers	2004–05	Ligue 2	17	3	2	1	0	0	–		19	4
Angers	2005–06	Championnat National	29	8	1	1	0	0	–		30	9
Angers	Total		46	11	3	2	0	0	0	0	49	13
Charleroi	2006–07	Belgian First Division	4	3	0	0	0	0	–		4	3
Steaua București	2006–07	Liga I	17	10	3	0	7	0	–		27	10
Anderlecht	2007–08	Belgian First Division	11	1	0	0	4	1	–		15	2
Charleroi	2008–09	Belgian First Division	30	4	0	0	0	0	–		30	4
Charleroi	2009–10	Belgian First Division	29	12	2	0	0	0	4 (Note: Appearances in relegation playoffs)	1	35	13
Charleroi	2010–11	Belgian First Division	3	0	0	0	0	0	–		3	0
Charleroi	Total		62	16	2	0	0	0	4	1	68	17
Chievo	2010–11	Serie A	23	2	0	0	0	0	–		23	2
Chievo	2011–12	Serie A	32	6	1	2	0	0	–		33	8
Chievo	2012–13	Serie A	37	11	2	1	0	0	–		39	12
Chievo	2013–14	Serie A	32	7	1	2	0	0	–		33	9
Chievo	Total		124	26	4	5	0	0	0	0	128	31
Udinese	2014–15	Serie A	37	10	3	3	0	0	–		40	13
Udinese	2015–16	Serie A	36	11	1	1	0	0	–		37	12
Udinese	2016–17	Serie A	33	12	0	0	0	0	–		33	12
Udinese	2017–18	Serie A	2	2	1	1	–		–		3	3
Udinese	Total		108	35	5	5	0	0	0	0	113	40
Fiorentina	2017–18	Serie A	20	5	0	0	–		–		20	5
Fiorentina	2018–19	Serie A	2	0	0	0	–		–		2	0
Fiorentina	Total		22	5	0	0	0	0	0	0	22	5
Cagliari (loan)	2018–19	Serie A	5	0	0	0	–		–		5	0
Career total			409	119	17	12	11	1	4	1	441	133
