= Francesco Acerbi =

Italian footballer (born 1988)

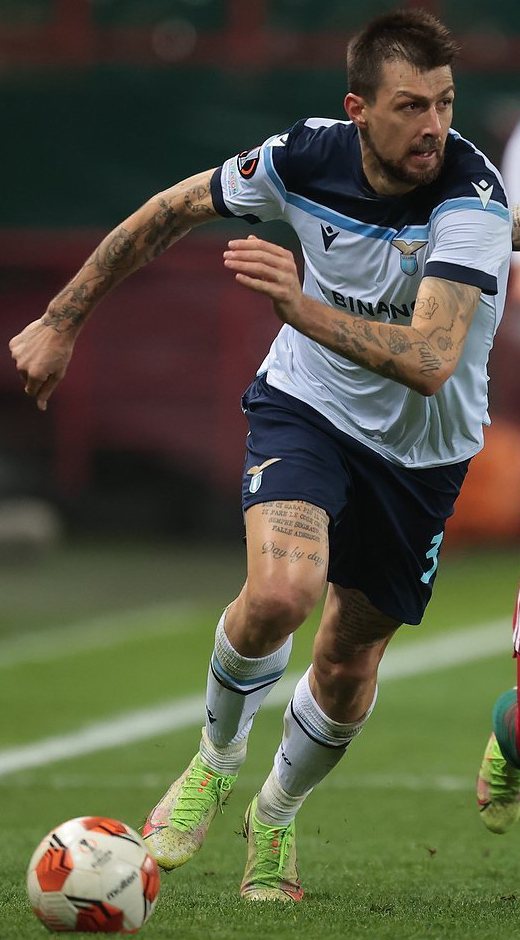
- Acerbi playing for Lazio in 2021

Personal information
- Full name: Francesco Acerbi
- Date of birth: 10 February 1988 (age 38)
- Place of birth: Vizzolo Predabissi, Italy
- Height: 1.92 m (6 ft 4 in)
- Position: Centre-back

Youth career
- Pavia

Senior career*
Years	Team	Apps	(Gls)
2006–2010	Pavia	48	(3)
2007	→ Renate (loan)	1	(0)
2007–2008	→ Spezia (loan)	0	(0)
2010–2011	Reggina	24	(1)
2011	Genoa	0	(0)
2011	→ Reggina (loan)	16	(1)
2011–2012	Chievo	17	(1)
2012–2013	AC Milan	6	(0)
2013	Genoa	0	(0)
2013	→ Chievo (loan)	7	(0)
2013–2018	Sassuolo	157	(11)
2018–2023	Lazio	135	(9)
2022–2023	→ Inter Milan (loan)	31	(0)
2023–2026	Inter Milan	70	(3)

International career^{‡}
2014–2023	Italy	34	(1)
Medal record
Men's Football
Representing Italy
UEFA European Championship
Winner	2020 Europe
UEFA Nations League
Third place	2021 Italy
Third place	2023 Netherlands
- * Club domestic league appearances and goals as of 17:21, 17 May 2026 (UTC) ‡ National team caps and goals as of 20 November 2023

Francesco Acerbi Cavaliere OMRI (Italian pronunciation: [franˈtʃesko aˈtʃɛrbi]; born 10 February 1988) is an Italian professional footballer who plays as a centre-back for the Italy national team.

Acerbi began his senior playing career with fifth-tier Pavia in 2006 before signing with Serie B side Reggina in 2010: a year later, Acerbi joined Serie A club Chievo, following a co-ownership transfer agreement involving Genoa, for €2 million. After a brief period with AC Milan in 2012, Acerbi returned to Chievo on loan in 2013, following another co-ownership transfer agreement also involving Genoa. He then permanently signed for newly-promoted Serie A club Sassuolo but was ruled out of his debut season after being treated for testicular cancer: he returned to playing in 2014.

In 2018, Acerbi was transferred to Lazio, where he won the Coppa Italia and Supercoppa Italiana. In 2022, he joined Inter Milan, and has gone on to win one Serie A title, another Coppa Italia, two Supercoppe Italiane, and reached the 2023 and 2025 UEFA Champions League final.

Acerbi made three appearances for the Italy national team in friendly matches before making his competitive debut in 2019. He was part of Italy's squad that won UEFA Euro 2020.

== Club career ==
=== Pavia ===
Born in Vizzolo Predabissi, Lombardy, Acerbi started his career at Lombard team Pavia, making his league debut on 23 April 2006. He was then loaned to Serie D team Renate on 11 January 2007 and played a club friendly on the same day. He made his official debut on 28 January in a 0–0 draw with Palazzolo. He returned to Pavia on 30 January and played in the last round of 2006–07 Serie C2.

On 2 August, Acerbi was loaned to Triestina then to Spezia on 16 August, though he only played for the latter's primavera under-20 team. He returned to Pavia on 1 July and became a regular in the first-team. He played both legs of 2009–10 Lega Pro Seconda Divisione promotion playoffs and finished as losing semi-finalists. The team was promoted after some teams were expelled from the league due to financial problems.

=== Reggina ===
Acerbi received a call-up to the pre-season camp of Serie B team Reggina on 13 July and the co-ownership deal completed on 16 July. On 31 January 2011, Pavia sold the remain 50 percent registration rights to Reggina for an undisclosed fee, whereupon the Calabrian side formed another co-ownership deal with Serie A team Genoa for €1 million. Acerbi only missed two games in 2010–11 Serie B and played both legs of promotion playoffs, losing to eventual playoff winners Novara in the semi-final. He played once during the 2010–11 Coppa Italia, a match he was ultimately sent off in. He was suspended in the next cup match and was not included in the third round.

=== Chievo ===
On 24 June 2011, Genoa purchased the remaining 50 percent of Acerbi's registration rights from Reggina for €2.2 million and sent Antonino Ragusa the other direction. On 1 July 2011, Acerbi was sold to Chievo in a co-ownership deal for €2 million as part of the deal that saw Kévin Constant transferred to Genoa for €7.8 million, with Ivan Fatić also returning to Chievo for €200,000 in June 2011. Acerbi entered the starting XI in the second half of the season making 14 starts, partnering with Marco Andreolli in nine games, Dario Dainelli three games and Boštjan Cesar two games.

=== Milan ===
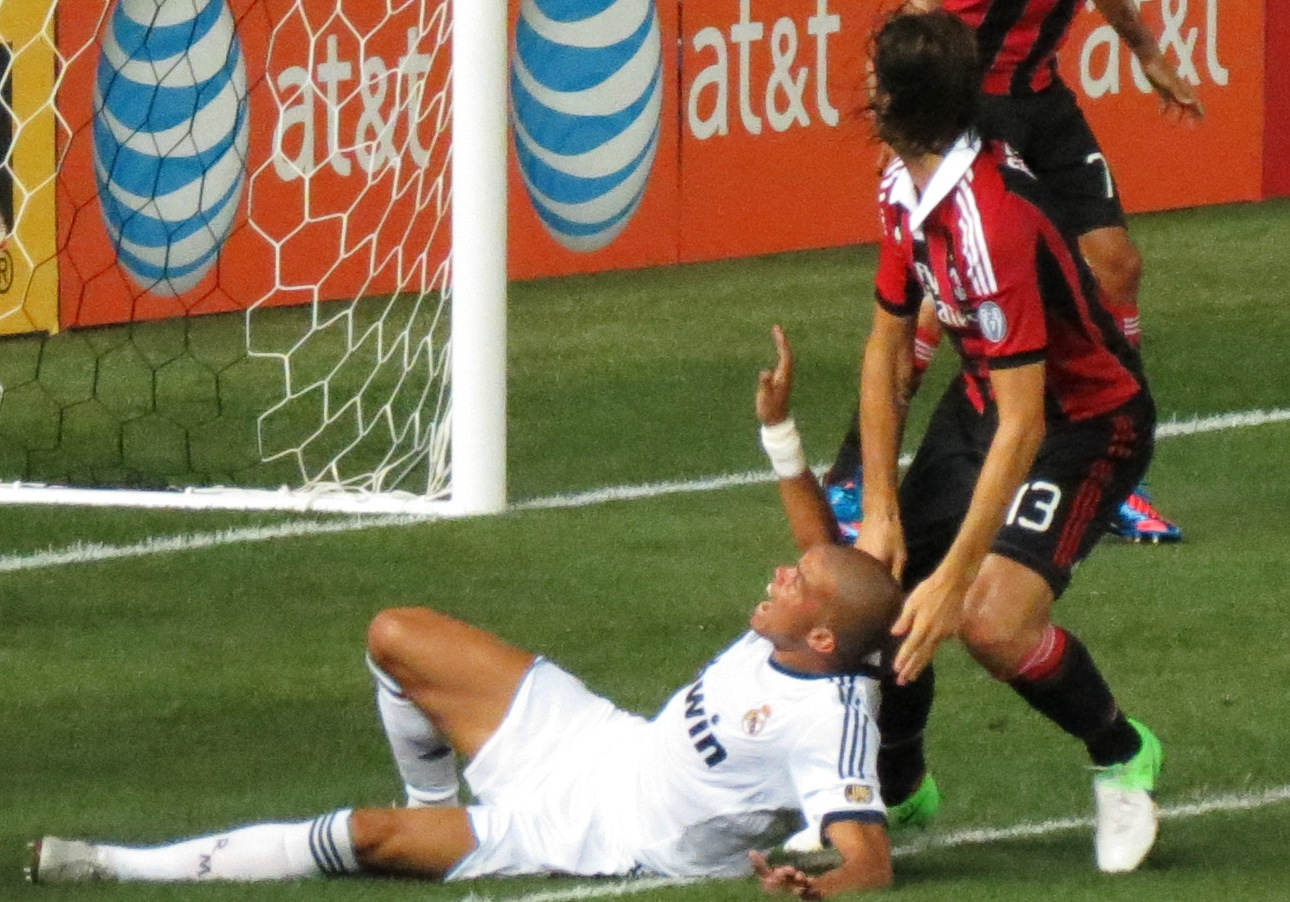
Acerbi next to Real Madrid's Pepe during Milan's match against Real Madrid in 2012.

On 20 June 2012, Milan bought Chievo's 50 percent share of Acerbi, with Genoa retaining the remaining half of his registration rights. Co-currently, Milan signed Kévin Constant in temporary loan deal from Genoa. In July 2012, Isaac Cofie joined Chievo from Genoa as part of financial compensation. Genoa revealed in the financial report of 2012 calendar year that Genoa repurchased 50 percent of the registration rights to Acerbi for €3.75 million and subsequently sold them to Milan for €4 million, whilst Cofie cost Chievo €1.5 million. The deals effectively made Genoa a profit of €250,000, whilst Chievo received new compensation for Constant's price tag.

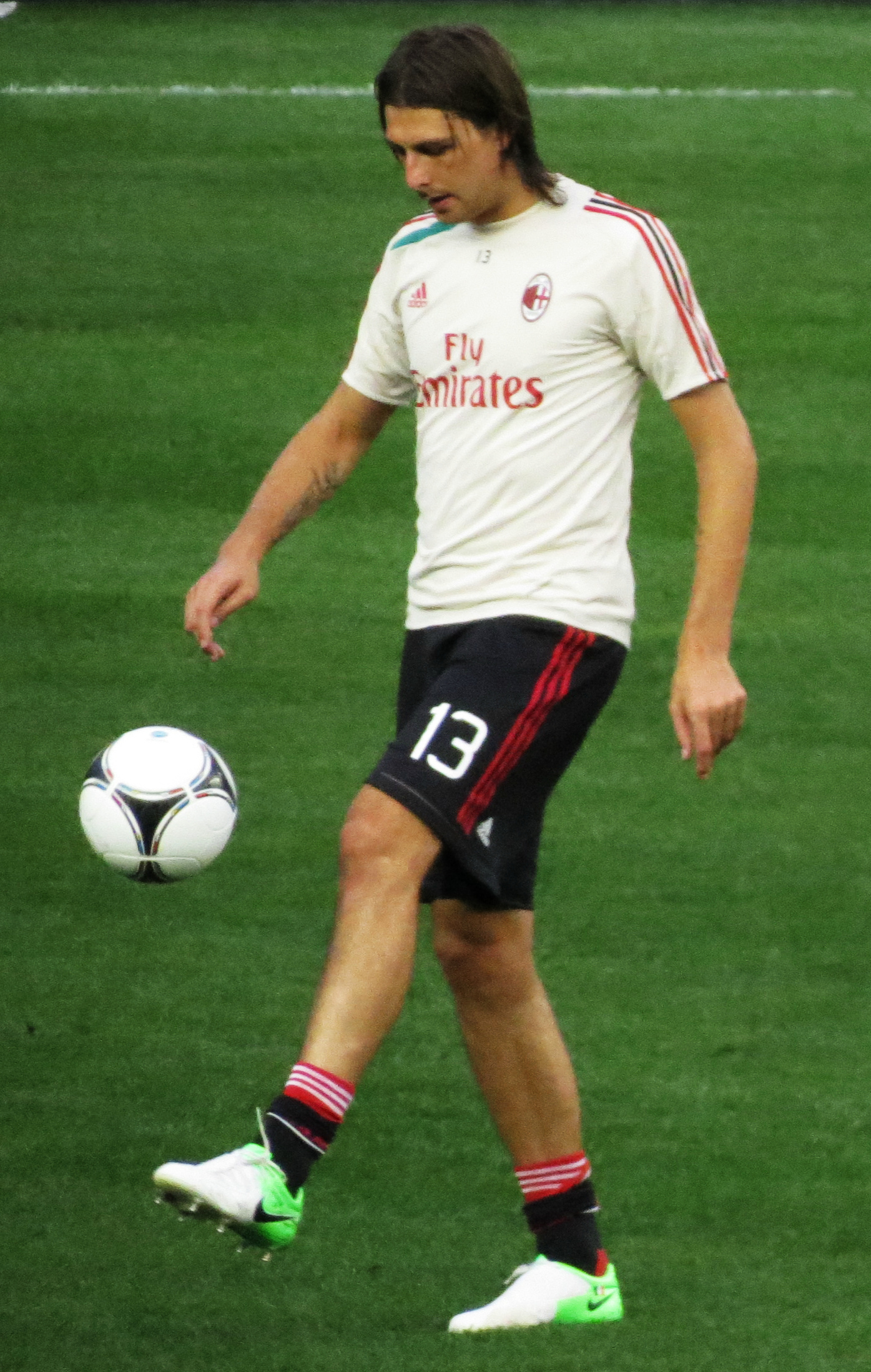
Acerbi training with Milan in 2012

Acerbi debuted for Milan in its 3–1 win over Bologna, though he failed to gain a stable place in starting line-up and left the club during the winter transfer window.

In 2019, Acerbi revealed that during his time in Milan he suffered from depression, grieving the death of his father, and often relied on alcohol to quell his emotional pain.

=== Genoa and Chievo ===
On 26 January 2013, Milan purchased 50 percent of the rights of Kévin Constant for €4 million. Acerbi, as a part of the deal, moved to Genoa also for €4 million, from where his previous club Chievo loaned him back for a €300,000 fee. He made seven appearances in the second half of 2012–13 Serie A.

=== Sassuolo ===
On 9 July 2013, Sassuolo, recently promoted to the Serie A, purchased half of Acerbi's playing rights for a €1.8 million fee. the rest remained a property of Genoa. During a pre-season medical, unusual blood tests revealed a testicular tumour, having surgery to remove the tumour. Soon after having the tumour removed, he resumed training with his new teammates. Acerbi had taken part in 13 games of the 2013–14 Serie A season before he failed a doping test in December 2013; he denied using any banned performance-enhancing drugs, and that it was due to irregular hormone levels caused by the return of the cancer. He subsequently underwent chemotherapy from 7 January to 14 March 2014. It was also reported that Acerbi did not miss the majority of training sessions during his cancer treatment period. Despite this, his return to the pitch was postponed until the next season.

In June 2014, the co-ownership deal was renewed by Sassuolo.

On 30 January 2015, Sassuolo purchased Acerbi outright for an additional €1.8 million fee. On the same day Genoa acquired Lorenzo Ariaudo and Leonardo Pavoletti from Sassuolo on temporary deals for free.

=== Lazio ===
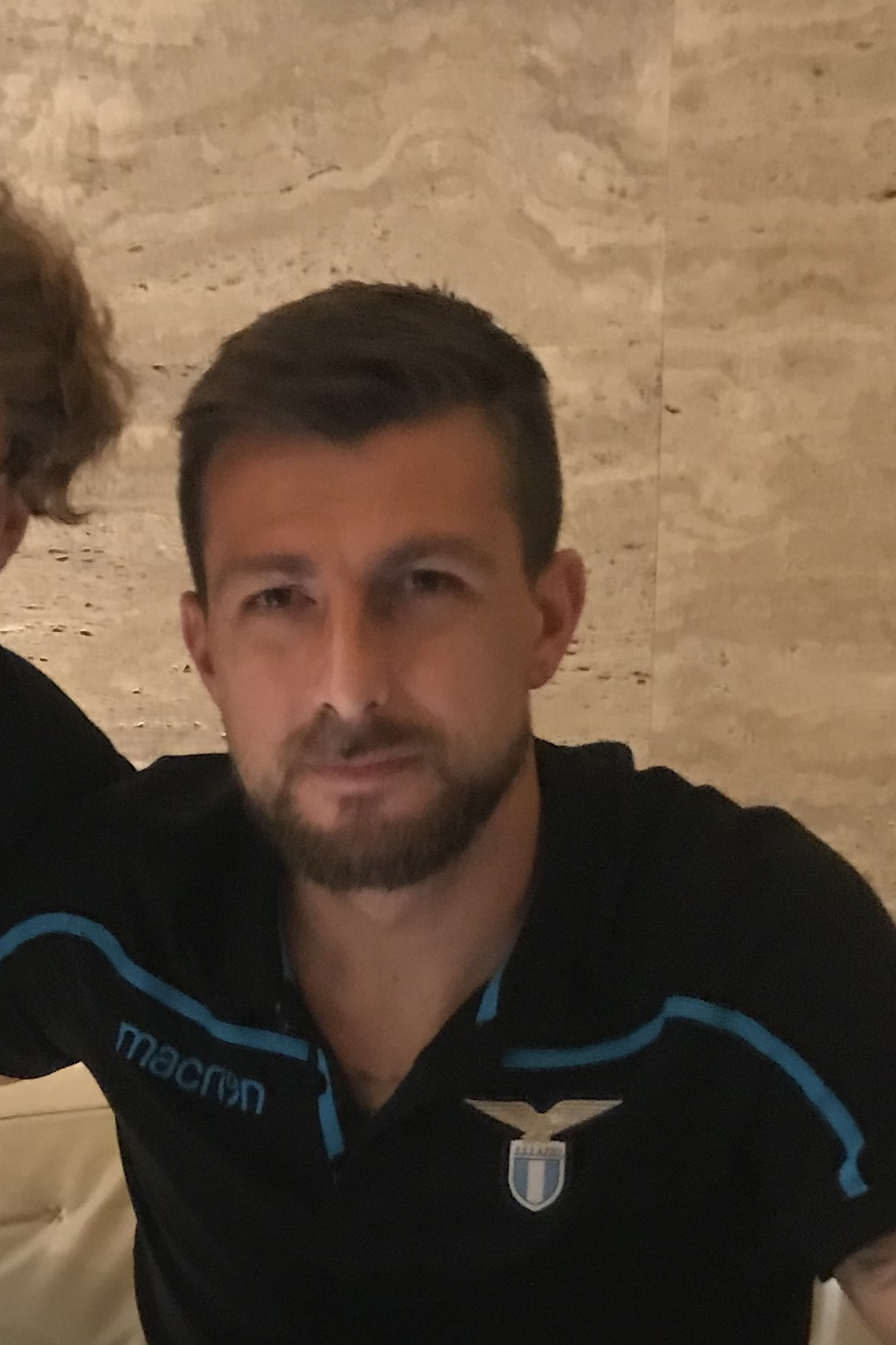
Lazio defender Francesco Acerbi in 2019

On 11 July 2018, Acerbi joined Lazio on a five-year contract. He was set to catch up to the record of 162 consecutive Serie A appearances by an outfield player, held by Javier Zanetti. However, Acerbi's own personal record was stopped at 149 games due to a two-yellow-card suspension on 20 January 2019. His personal run started on 18 October 2015, when he was still a Sassuolo player.

=== Inter Milan ===
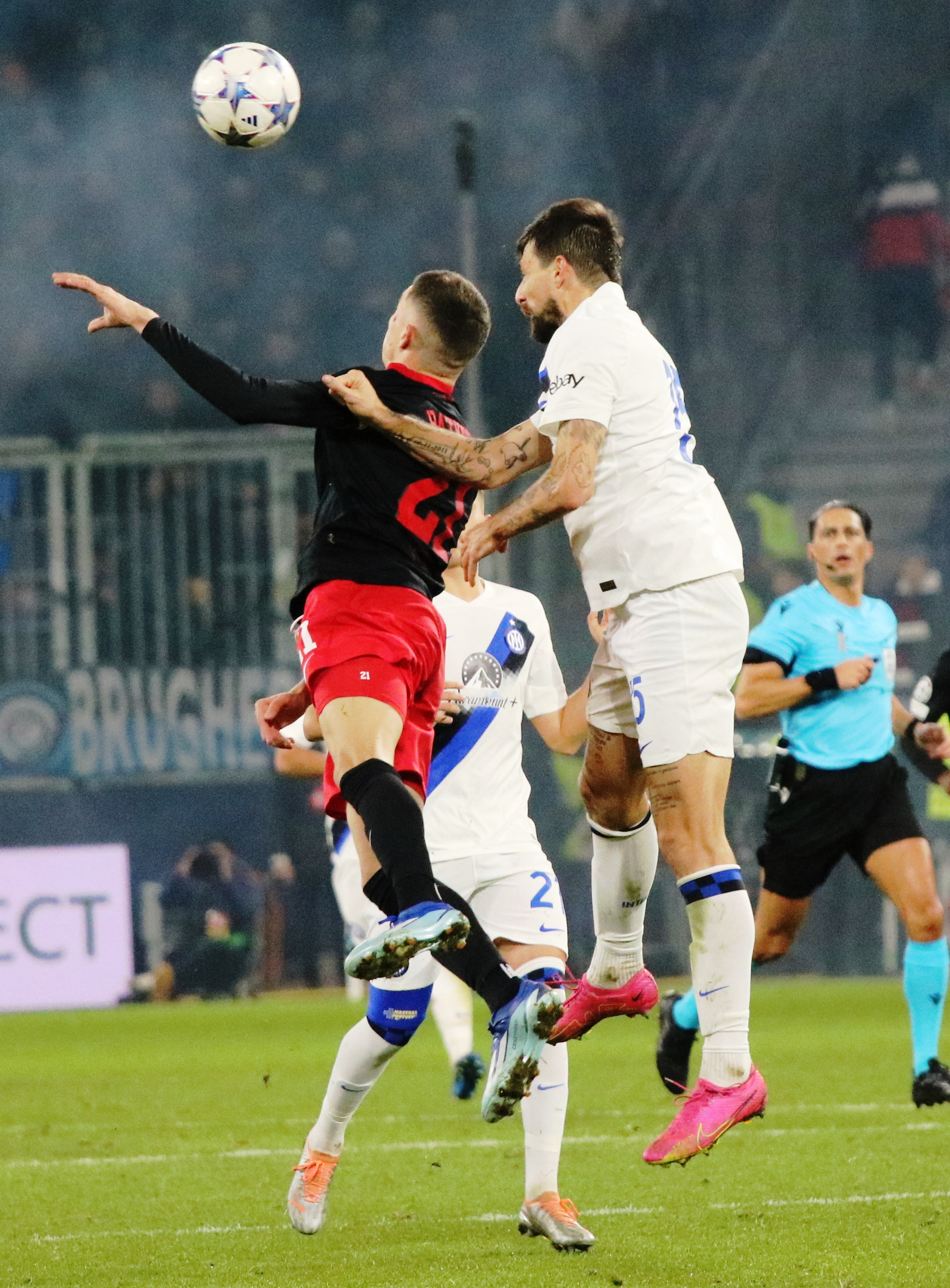
Acerbi (right) during a Champions League match against Red Bull Salzburg in 2023

On 1 September 2022, Acerbi moved on loan to Inter Milan. At Inter, he replaced outgoing Andrea Ranocchia and reunited with his former Lazio manager Simone Inzaghi. Initially regarded as rather a substitute, Acerbi once again became a regular starter as the season progressed.

Acerbi was a starter in the 2023 UEFA Champions League final where he was praised for shutting down Manchester City's Erling Haaland from scoring, although Inter ultimately lost 1–0.

On 7 July 2023, Inter exercised his buy option clause and signed Acerbi permanently. On 22 April 2024, he scored a header in a 2–1 win over his former club AC Milan, securing his first Serie A title with Inter in the 2023–24 season with five matches remaining.

On 6 May 2025, Acerbi scored his first-ever UEFA Champions League goal, a 93rd-minute equalizer with his weak foot against Barcelona in the second leg of the semifinals, to level the aggregate score at 6–6 in an eventual victory in extra-time, securing qualification for their second final in three years. In doing so at the age of 37 years and 85 days, he became the second oldest goalscorer in a UCL semifinal, only behind Ryan Giggs in 2011 (37 years and 148 days). He departed the club following the conclusion of the 2025–26 season after winning the domestic double.

== International career ==
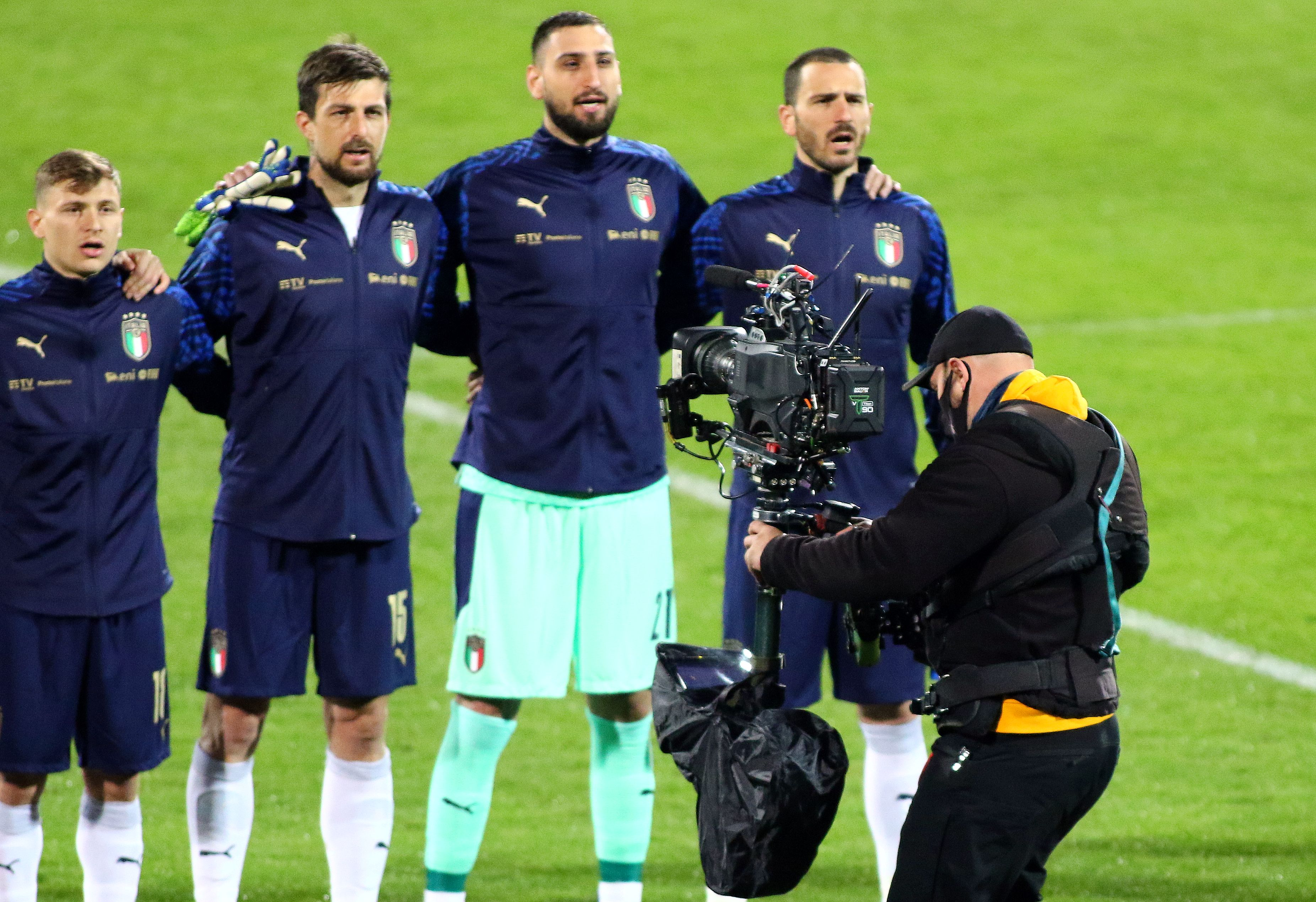
Acerbi (second from left) with Italy in 2021

Acerbi has been capped once for the Italy under-20 Lega Pro representative team at the first match of 2008–09 Mirop Cup, losing to Hungary.

On 10 August 2012, Acerbi received his first senior team call-up from Cesare Prandelli. He made his senior debut for Italy under Antonio Conte, on 18 November 2014, in a 1–0 friendly win over Albania in Genoa, playing the full 90 minutes.

He played his first competitive match for Italy under Roberto Mancini, on 8 September 2019, in a 2–1 away win over Finland in a Euro 2020 qualifier. His first senior goal for Italy came on 15 November, in a 3–0 away win over Bosnia and Herzegovina, in a Euro 2020 qualifier.

In June 2021, Acerbi was included in Italy's squad for UEFA Euro 2020. In Italy's second group match against Switzerland in Rome on 16 June, Acerbi made his first appearance of the tournament, coming on for the injured Giorgio Chiellini in the first half of an eventual 3–0 victory, which allowed his side to advance to the knock-out stages. On 26 June, he started and assisted the match-winning goal, scored by Matteo Pessina, in extra-time of a 2–1 win over Austria in the round of 16. On 11 July, Acerbi won the European Championship with Italy following a 3–2 penalty shoot-out victory over England at Wembley Stadium in the final, after a 1–1 draw in extra-time.

On 23 May 2024, he was named in the 30-man preliminary squad for the UEFA Euro 2024. However, he sustained a groin injury which would force him to miss the tournament.

== Player profile ==
=== Style of play ===
Acerbi is regarded in the media as a tall, tenacious, and physically powerful left-footed defender, who excels in the air. Being naturally left-footed, he normally plays as a left-sided centre-back in either a three or four-man defensive line, both in Serie A and for the Italy national team. While he lacks significant pace, his height and attributes allow him to be involved in physical and aerial duels, both defensively and offensively, and make him a goal threat on set-pieces. Moreover, his technical skills and ball-playing ability allow him to carry or play the ball out from the back. He has also been praised in the media for his leadership qualities, as well as his consistency and longevity, and his man-marking skills, which had initially been cited as a weakness earlier in his career.

=== Reception ===
In his prime, Acerbi was considered by pundits to be one of the best defenders in Serie A, and is regarded as one of the best Italian defenders of his generation. Former Italy midfielder Claudio Marchisio praised Acerbi as the best defender in Europe in March 2025. After facing Acerbi in Bayern Munich's quarter-final tie against Inter in the Champions League the following month, English striker Harry Kane described him as one of the best defenders in the world.

== Personal life ==
Since 2020 he has been linked to Claudia Scarpari, with whom he has two daughters, Vittoria (born in 2021) and Nala (born in 2023). The couple married in early 2025 in Cassina Rizzardi.

== Career statistics ==
=== Club ===
As of match played 17 May 2026

Appearances and goals by club, season and competition
Club	Season	League			National cup		Europe		Other		Total	
Club	Season	Division	Apps	Goals	Apps	Goals	Apps	Goals	Apps	Goals	Apps	Goals
Pavia	2005–06	Serie C1	1	0	2	0	—		—		3	0
Pavia	2006–07	Serie C1	1	0	0	0	—		—		1	0
Pavia	2008–09	Lega Pro Seconda Divisione	22	2	3	0	—		—		25	2
Pavia	2009–10	Lega Pro Seconda Divisione	24	1	1	0	—		2 (Note: Appearances in Lega Pro play-offs)	0	27	1
Pavia	Total		48	3	6	0	—		2	0	56	3
Renate (loan)	2006–07	Serie D	1	0	0	0	—		—		1	0
Reggina	2010–11	Serie B	40	2	1	0	—		2 (Note: Appearances in Serie B promotion play-offs)	0	43	2
Chievo	2011–12	Serie A	17	1	3	0	—		—		20	1
Milan	2012–13	Serie A	6	0	2	0	2 (Note: Appearances in UEFA Champions League)	0	—		10	0
Chievo (loan)	2012–13	Serie A	7	0	0	0	—		—		7	0
Sassuolo	2013–14	Serie A	13	0	0	0	—		—		13	0
Sassuolo	2014–15	Serie A	32	3	0	0	—		—		32	3
Sassuolo	2015–16	Serie A	36	4	2	0	—		—		38	4
Sassuolo	2016–17	Serie A	38	4	1	0	10 (Note: Appearances in UEFA Europa League)	0	—		49	4
Sassuolo	2017–18	Serie A	38	0	3	0	—		—		41	0
Sassuolo	Total		157	11	6	0	10	0	—		173	11
Lazio	2018–19	Serie A	37	3	5	0	8	0	—		50	3
Lazio	2019–20	Serie A	36	2	2	0	6	0	1 (Note: Appearance(s) in Supercoppa Italiana)	0	45	2
Lazio	2020–21	Serie A	32	0	2	1	8	0	—		42	1
Lazio	2021–22	Serie A	30	4	0	0	6	0	—		36	4
Lazio	Total		135	9	9	1	28	0	1	0	173	10
Inter Milan (loan)	2022–23	Serie A	31	0	5	1	12	0	1	0	49	1
Inter Milan	2023–24	Serie A	29	3	1	0	6	0	2	0	38	3
Inter Milan	2024–25	Serie A	23	0	1	0	9	1	2 (Note: Appearances in FIFA Club World Cup)	0	35	1
Inter Milan	2025–26	Serie A	18	0	3	0	5	0	0	0	26	0
Inter Milan	Inter total		101	3	10	1	32	1	5	0	148	5
Career total			512	29	37	2	72	1	10	0	631	32

=== International ===
As of match played 20 November 2023

Appearances and goals by national team and year
National team	Year	Apps	Goals
Italy	2014	1	0
Italy	2015	0	0
Italy	2016	1	0
Italy	2017	0	0
Italy	2018	1	0
Italy	2019	3	1
Italy	2020	5	0
Italy	2021	11	0
Italy	2022	6	0
Italy	2023	6	0
Total		34	1

Scores and results list Italy's goal tally first, score column indicates score after each Acerbi goal.

List of international goals scored by Francesco Acerbi
No.	Date	Venue	Opponent	Score	Result	Competition
1	15 November 2019	Bilino Polje Stadium, Zenica, Bosnia and Herzegovina	Bosnia and Herzegovina	1–0	3–0	UEFA Euro 2020 qualification

== Honours ==
Lazio

- Coppa Italia: 2018–19
- Supercoppa Italiana: 2019

Inter Milan

- Serie A: 2023–24, 2025–26
- Coppa Italia: 2022–23, 2025–26
- Supercoppa Italiana: 2022, 2023
- UEFA Champions League runner-up: 2022–23, 2024–25

Italy

- UEFA European Championship: 2020
- UEFA Nations League third place: 2020–21, 2022–23

Individual

- Pallone d'Argento: 2014–15

=== Orders ===
- 5th Class / Knight: Cavaliere Ordine al Merito della Repubblica Italiana: 2021
