= Christian Puggioni =

Italian footballer (born 1981)

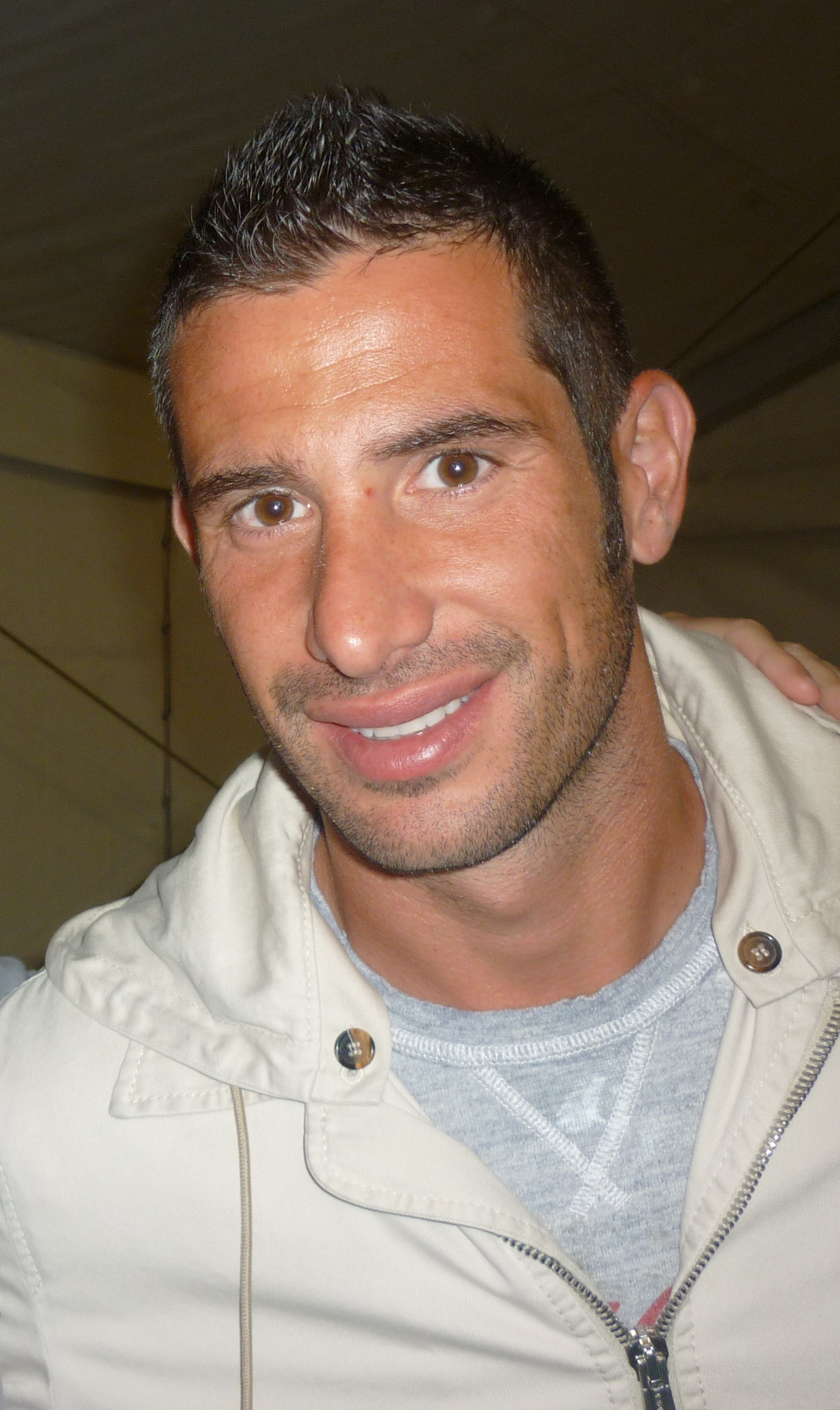

Personal information
- Date of birth: 17 January 1981 (age 45)
- Place of birth: Genoa, Italy
- Height: 1.87 m (6 ft 2 in)
- Position: Goalkeeper

Team information
- Current team: U.C. Sampdoria spa

Youth career
- Sampdoria

Senior career*
Years	Team	Apps	(Gls)
2000–2001	Varese	1	(0)
2001–2002	Borgomanero	33	(0)
2003–2004	Giulianova	19	(0)
2004–2007	Pisa	80	(0)
2007–2011	Reggina	61	(0)
2007–2008	→ Perugia (loan)	33	(0)
2009–2010	→ Piacenza (loan)	41	(0)
2011–2015	Chievo	41	(0)
2015–2018	Sampdoria	30	(0)
2018–2019	Benevento	23	(0)
2019–2021	Vis Pesaro	11	(0)
Total		373	(0)
- * Club domestic league appearances and goals

Christian Puggioni (born 17 January 1981) is an Italian former footballer who played as a goalkeeper.

== Career ==
In January 2007, Puggioni joined Reggina.

On 2 July 2015, Puggioni signed with Sampdoria on a free transfer. He made his debut with Sampdoria on 22 October 2016, in a 2–1 home win against cross-city rivals Genoa, at the Stadio Luigi Ferraris.

On 28 November 2019, he joined Serie C club Vis Pesaro. In October 2020 he gave an interview in which he criticized Vis Pesaro's coaching and management team, after which the team issued an official statement of their position. His contract was set to expire in June 2021, but he was not released from the contract and continued to train individually, separately from the team. He never played another competitive game and retired at the end of the season.

== Career statistics ==
Appearances and goals by club, season and competition
Club	Season	League			Cup		Europe		Other		Total	
Club	Season	Division	Apps	Goals	Apps	Goals	Apps	Goals	Apps	Goals	Apps	Goals
Varese	2000–01	Serie C1	1	0	0	0	—		—		1	0
Borgomanero	2001–02	Serie D	33	0	0	0	—		—		33	0
Giulianova	2003–04	Serie C1	19	0	0	0	—		—		19	0
Pisa	2004–05	Serie C1	28	0	4	0	—		—		32	0
Pisa	2005–06	Serie C1	33	0	2	0	—		—		35	0
Pisa	2006–07	Serie C1	19	0	2	0	—		—		21	0
Pisa	Total		80	0	8	0	—		—		88	0
Reggina	2006–07	Serie A	3	0	—		—		—		3	0
Reggina	2008–09	Serie A	16	0	1	0	—		—		17	0
Reggina	2010–11	Serie B	42	0	1	0	—		2	0	45	0
Reggina	Total		61	0	2	0	—		2	0	65	0
Perugia (loan)	2007–08	Serie C1	33	0	0	0	—		2	0	35	0
Piacenza (loan)	2009–10	Serie B	41	0	1	0	—		—		42	0
Chievo	2011–12	Serie A	1	0	4	0	—		—		5	0
Chievo	2012–13	Serie A	17	0	1	0	—		—		18	0
Chievo	2013–14	Serie A	23	0	1	0	—		—		24	0
Chievo	2014–15	Serie A	0	0	0	0	—		—		0	0
Chievo	Total		41	0	6	0	—		—		47	0
Sampdoria	2015–16	Serie A	0	0	0	0	0	0	—		0	0
Sampdoria	2016–17	Serie A	21	0	2	0	—		—		23	0
Sampdoria	2017–18	Serie A	9	0	3	0	—		—		12	0
Sampdoria	Total		30	0	5	0	—		—		35	0
Benevento	2017–18	Serie A	14	0	0	0	—		—		14	0
Benevento	2018–19	Serie B	9	0	2	0	—		0	0	11	0
Benevento	Total		23	0	2	0	—		0	0	25	0
Vis Pesaro	2019–20	Serie C	8	0	0	0	—		—		8	0
Vis Pesaro	2020–21	Serie C	3	0	—		—		—		3	0
Vis Pesaro	Total		11	0	0	0	—		—		11	0
Career Total			373	0	24	0	0	0	4	0	401	0
