= Lorenzo Squizzi =

Italian footballer (born 1974)

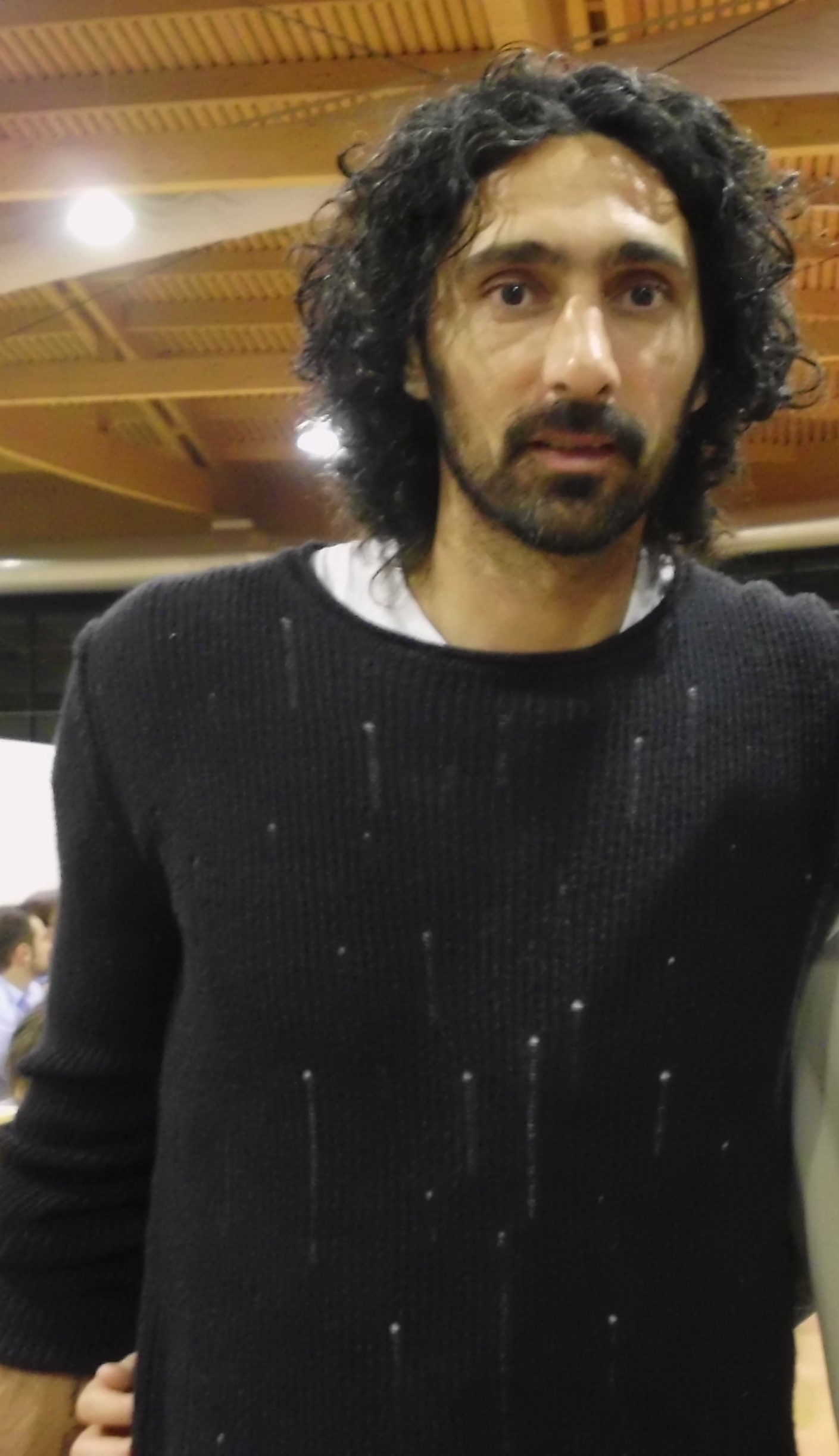
- Squizzi in January 2010

Personal information
- Date of birth: 20 June 1974 (age 52)
- Place of birth: Domodossola, Italy
- Height: 1.91 m (6 ft 3 in)
- Position: Goalkeeper

Youth career
- 1992–1994: Juventus

Senior career*
Years	Team	Apps	(Gls)
1994–1995	Juventus	1	(0)
1995–1996	SPAL	2	(0)
1996–1997	Atletico Catania	32	(0)
1997–1999	Lucchese	64	(0)
1999–2000	Salernitana	4	(0)
2000–2001	Reggiana	23	(0)
2001–2004	Monza	32	(0)
2002–2003	→ Cesena (loan)	34	(0)
2003–2004	→ Catania (loan)	30	(0)
2004–2005	Perugia	14	(0)
2005–2014	Chievo	84	(0)
Total		320	(0)
- * Club domestic league appearances and goals

Lorenzo Squizzi (born 20 June 1974) is an Italian former professional footballer who played as a goalkeeper.

Squizzi started his career at Serie A team Juventus, but spent most of his career in the lower divisions. In summer 2006, he signed for his second Serie A club Chievo.

== Career ==
=== Early career ===
Born in Domodossola, Piedmont, Squizzi started his career at Juventus, the club giant of the region. In 1994–95 season, he worked as Angelo Peruzzi's backup, along with Michelangelo Rampulla. He played the final match of the season, which Le Zebre already secured the title weeks before. In the next season he left for Serie C1 club SPAL, where he worked as Oriano Boschin's backup. In 1996–97 season, he left for Atletico Catania, where he helped the club reach the semi-final of the promotion playoffs.

=== Lucchese ===
Squizzi secured a long-term contract with Serie B club Lucchese, where he helped the league struggler avoided relegation in the first season. In the second season, the poor scoring record made the club finished the second from the bottom, made Squizzi had to search another club.

=== Salernitana ===
Squizzi joined Salernitana which newly relegated from Serie A in a co-ownership deal, which also saw Ciro Polito moved to opposite direction. He worked as Fabrizio Lorieri's backup, ahead youth product Rosario Niosi, Lorieri himself also a new signing but from Serie A club Lecce. He survived in mid-season sale, which saw Salernitana reduced the number of goalkeeper from 5 to 3 by sending ex-no.2 Andrea Ivan and youth product Crescenzo De Vito to Livorno and Giugliano respectively. But after Salernitana failed to return to Serie A, all goalkeeper were left the club and replaced by Salvatore Soviero, Domenico Botticella and youth product Raffaele Coscia. Ciro Polito, who was bought back from Lucchese, also transferred to Avellino.

=== Serie C1 (2000–03) ===
In November 2000, Squizzi signed for Reggiana. He quickly became the first choice, ahead of Raffaele Nuzzo. With club they survived in the relegation play-out.

In the next season he secured another long-term contract with newly relegated side Monza, ahead of Luca Davide Righi and youth product Daniele Mandelli. But the team-mate failed to score into opponent nets once again made Squizzi tasted relegation.

In the next season he was loaned to Cesena as the first-choice goalkeeper, ahead Francesco Musarra and Davide Bertaccini, replacing Nicola Santoni who left for Palermo. He concerned only 29 goals in the season, ranked 2 least among the teams, behind Pisa. Although his team finished third and Pisa finished fourth, the team lost to Pisa in promotion playoffs semi-finals.

=== Catania ===
Due to Monza failing to win promotion, on 29 August 2003 Squizzi secured a move to Catania of Serie B, ahead Emanuele Concetti, Paolo Mancini (joined in January) and youth product Gaetano Romano as first choice. He concerned only 29 goals in 29 league matches with 11 clean sheets, but after injured in March, Concetti and Mancini concerned 15 goals in 9 league matches with 4 clean sheets and 4 goals in 4 matches with 1 clean sheet respectively between round 33 to 45. Squizzi returned to field on the last round, played 77 minutes as starter without concerned a goal, before replaced by Mancini. The match ended in 2–0 won to the second club ranked from the bottom.

=== Perugia ===
His performance made Perugia, which newly relegated to Serie B, sign him to provide extra cover for Australian international Željko Kalac. He conceded 9 goals in 14 matches, with Kalac conceding 25 goals in 29 matches. Squizzi also played all 4 promotion playoffs that lost to Torino in the finals. But Perugia was expelled from Serie B due to financial problem.

=== Chievo ===
In August 2005 Squizzi signed for Chievo, his second Serie A club, initially as backup of Alberto Fontana, along with youth product Enrico Alfonso. But in the first match of the season, he replaced Fontana at half time, after Chievo concerned a goal from David Trezeguet, of his former team Juve. In that season, he occasionally played 12 league matches, 9 of them were starter.

In the next season, the club signed Vincenzo Sicignano from relegated Lecce to replace Fontana who left for Palermo. But Squizzi was promoted to first choice in the 2 round (ahead youth product Mattia Passarini) and played one UEFA Cup match verse Sporting Braga. In the round 7 Sicignano regained his place but in February Squizzi restored as first choice, ahead his former team-mate Emanuele Concetti who signed in mid-season. Although Sicignano and Squizzi concerned 24 goals each, and ranked mid-table by terms of goals concerned, Chievo poor goal scoring, partially due to the left of Amauri, made Sicignano and Squizzi once again tasted relegation.

At Serie B, Squizzi secured his place as first choice, ahead Gabriele Aldegani and Mattia Passarini. He won Serie B champion with team and returned to Serie A.

Since the signing of Stefano Sorrentino in July 2008 and turned to age 34, he worked as backup goalkeeper again, along with Gabriele Aldegani (2008–09) and Michał Miśkiewicz (2009–10).

On 7 June 2010, Chievo announced Squizzi had signed a new one-year contract. He extended his contract again in July 2011 and 2012.

== Career statistics ==
Appearances and goals by club, season and competition
Club	Season	League			National cup		Europe		Other		Total	
Club	Season	Division	Apps	Goals	Apps	Goals	Apps	Goals	Apps	Goals	Apps	Goals
Juventus	1994–95	Serie A	1	0	0	0	0	0	—		1	0
SPAL	1995–96	Serie C1	2	0	—		—		0	0	2	0
Atletico Catania	1996–97	Serie C1	32	0	—		—		2 (Note: Appearance(s) in promotion play-offs)	0	34	0
Lucchese	1997–98	Serie B	34	0	2	0	—		—		36	0
Lucchese	1998–99	Serie B	30	0	4	0	—		—		34	0
Lucchese	Total		64	0	6	0	—		—		70	0
Salernitana	1999–2000	Serie B	4	0	0	0	—		—		4	0
Reggiana	2000–01	Serie C1	23	0	—		—		2 (Note: Appearance(s) in relegation play-offs)	0	25	0
Monza	2001–02	Serie C1	32	0	1	0	—		—		33	0
Cesena (loan)	2002–03	Serie C1	34	0	—		—		2	0	36	0
Catania (loan)	2003–04	Serie B	30	0	0	0	—		—		30	0
Perugia	2004–05	Serie B	14	0	0	0	—		4	0	18	0
Chievo	2005–06	Serie A	12	0	0	0	—		—		12	0
Chievo	2006–07	Serie A	21	0	4	0	1 (Note: Appearance(s) in UEFA cup)	0	—		26	0
Chievo	2007–08	Serie B	41	0	1	0	—		—		42	0
Chievo	2008–09	Serie A	5	0	1	0	—		—		6	0
Chievo	2009–10	Serie A	1	0	2	0	—		—		3	0
Chievo	2010–11	Serie A	2	0	3	0	—		—		5	0
Chievo	2011–12	Serie A	0	0	1	0	—		—		1	0
Chievo	2012–13	Serie A	1	0	0	0	—		—		1	0
Chievo	2013–14	Serie A	1	0	0	0	—		—		1	0
Chievo	Total		84	0	12	0	1	0	—		97	0
Career total			320	0	19	0	1	0	10	0	350	0

== Honours ==
Juventus

- Serie A: 1994–95
- Coppa Italia: 1994–95

Chievo

- Serie B: 2007–08
