= Riccardo Nardini =

Italian footballer

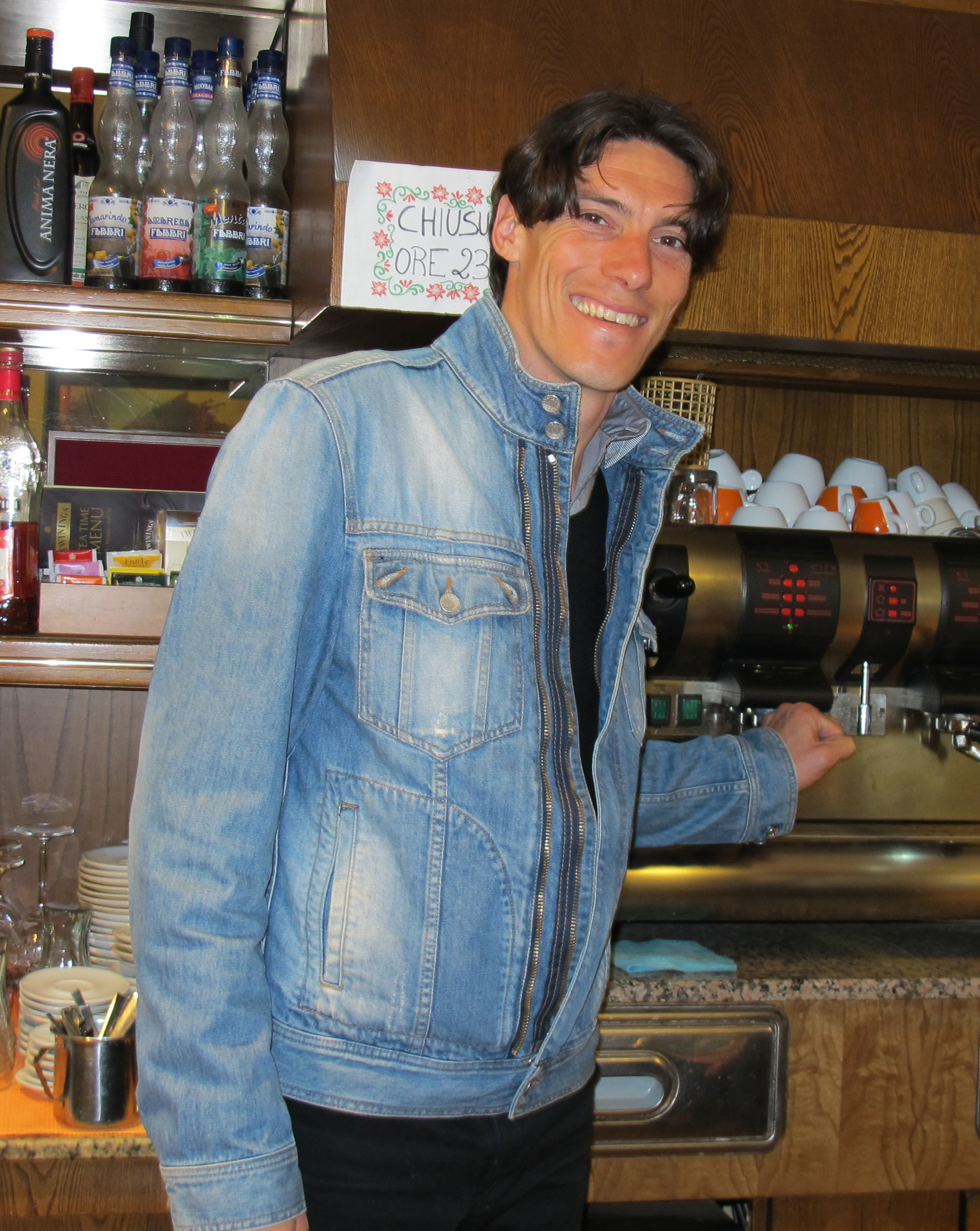
- Nardini in Dogana Nuova on Easter 2012

Personal information
- Date of birth: 27 June 1983 (age 43)
- Place of birth: Pavullo nel Frignano, Italy
- Height: 1.85 m (6 ft 1 in)
- Positions: Midfielder; defender

Team information
- Current team: Aglianese

Youth career
- Aglianese
- 1999–2001: Pistoiese

Senior career*
Years	Team	Apps	(Gls)
2001–2002	Aglianese	20	(2)
2002–2003	Poggibonsi	26	(7)
2003	Prato	7	(0)
2004	Sangiovannese	5	(1)
2004	Prato	18	(3)
2005	Foggia	13	(0)
2005–2008	Catania	6	(0)
2006	→ Modena (loan)	7	(0)
2007	→ Reggina (loan)	12	(0)
2008	→ Avellino (loan)	17	(1)
2008–2010	Reggiana	56	(8)
2010–2011	Empoli	33	(0)
2011–2016	Modena	118	(2)
2015	→ Ascoli (loan)	17	(0)
2016–2017	Messina	5	(1)
2017	Pro Vercelli	7	(0)
2018	Pistoiese	14	(0)
2018–	Aglianese		
- * Club domestic league appearances and goals as of 11 May 2018

Riccardo Nardini (born 27 June 1983) is an Italian football defender who plays for Aglianese.
