= Vincenzo Sicignano =

Italian footballer and coach

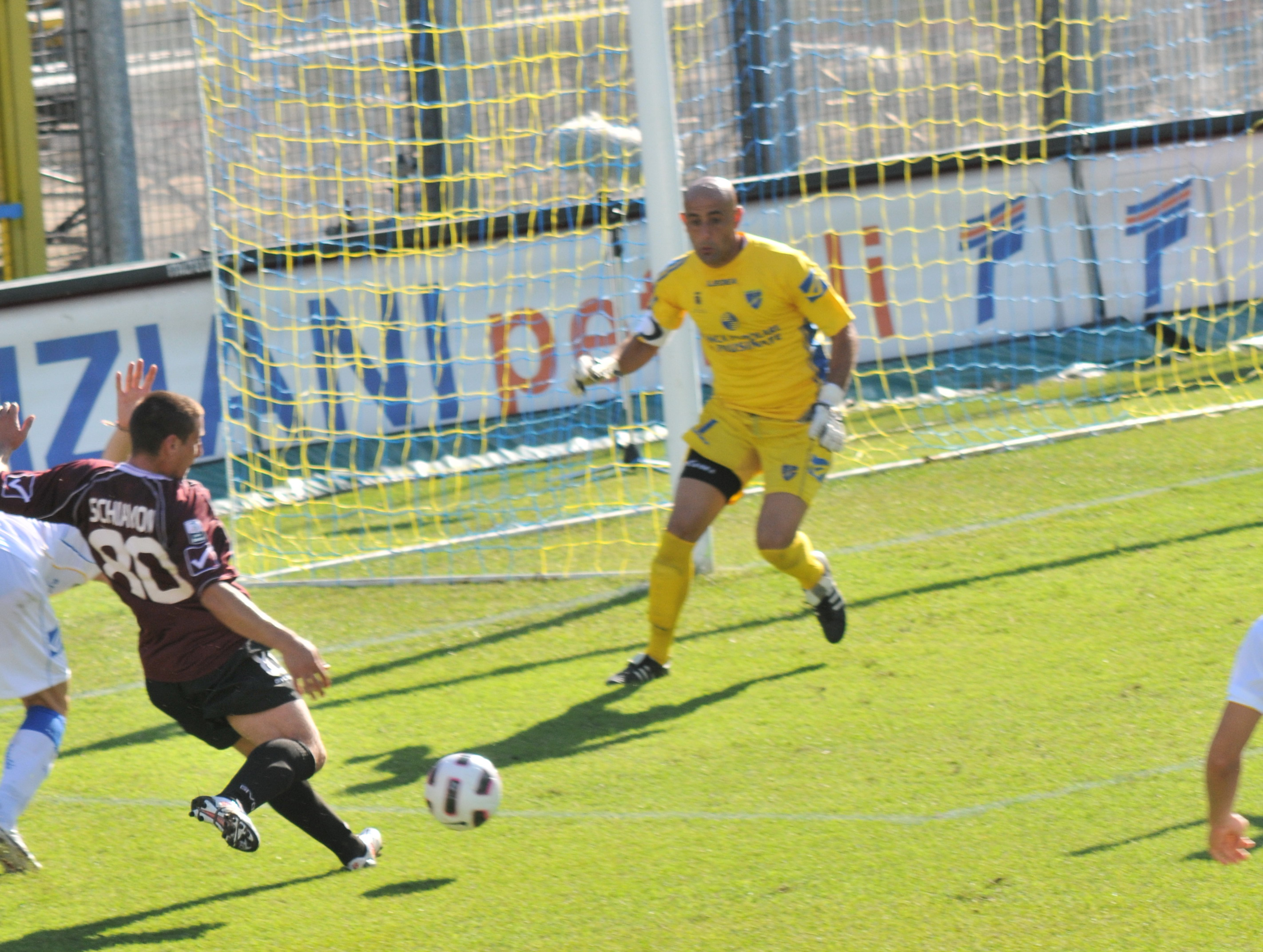
- 2010

Personal information
- Full name: Vincenzo Sicignano
- Date of birth: 8 July 1974 (age 52)
- Place of birth: Pompei, Italy
- Height: 1.88 m (6 ft 2 in)
- Position: Goalkeeper

Team information
- Current team: Beşiktaş (goalkeeping coach)

Youth career
- 1993–1994: Palermo

Senior career*
Years	Team	Apps	(Gls)
1994–2003	Palermo	182	(0)
2003	Parma	1	(0)
2004–2006	Lecce	78	(0)
2006–2008	Chievo	17	(0)
2007–2008	→ Frosinone (loan)	37	(0)
2008–2011	Frosinone	75	(0)
2011–2012	Barletta	13	(0)
Total		403	(0)
- * Club domestic league appearances and goals as of 22:39, 2 July 2012 (UTC)

Vincenzo Sicignano (born 8 July 1974 in Pompei, Province of Naples) is an Italian former football goalkeeper turned coach. He is currently working as goalkeeping coach for Turkish Süper Lig side Beşiktaş.

== Playing career ==
Unlike other footballers from Naples who started their career at Napoli, he started his career at the Sicilian club Palermo.

He left Palermo to join Parma in summer 2003. He made his debut for Parma replacing Sébastien Frey at half-time against Red Bull Salzburg on 6 November 2003. He made his Serie A debut in the 0–0 draw against Milan three days later. He also started the return leg against Salzburg, which Parma won 5–0 at home.

After his only Serie A appearance, and two more in the 2003–04 UEFA Cup, Sicignano joined Lecce on loan on 16 January 2004, which became a permanent deal.

After Lecce were relegated from Serie A, Sicignano joined ChievoVerona in the summer of 2006. He played two out of two qualifying matches in the 2006–07 UEFA Champions League and one out of two in the 2006–07 UEFA Cup; later in the season, he lost his place in the starting lineup to Lorenzo Squizzi. He played the 2007-08 season with Frosinone, being transferred from Chievo in a loan (exchange with Massimo Zappino) deal.

In summer 2008, he was signed outright, but he just played 20 games, being challenged by Pierluigi Frattali for first choice. He became more of a regular in 2009, when he was featured in 33 league games (out of 42). In 2010, he played only 22 games.

He left Frosinone in 2011, after the club suffered relegation from Serie B, to join Barletta in the Lega Pro Prima Divisione league.

== Post-playing and coaching career ==
After retiring in 2012, Sicignano accepted to return at his former club Palermo as goalkeeping coach of the Under-19 Primavera youth team. He was subsequently promoted to first team goalkeeping coach in June 2015.
