= 2000–01 Serie C1 =

The Serie C1 2000-2001 was the twenty-third edition of the rebranded major competition of the present-day Serie C.

== Group A ==
    Team                  Points
 1. MODENA                     74                Promoted to Serie B
----------------------------------
 2. COMO                       72                Promoted to Serie B (after play off)
 3. Livorno                    63
 4. Arezzo                     54
 5. Spezia                     52
----------------------------------
 6. Cesena                     49
 7. Lucchese                   48
 8. Lumezzane                  47
 9. Spal                       43
10. Varese                     43
11. Pisa                       42
12. Lecco                      40
13. Albinoleffe                39
----------------------------------
14. Carrarese                  33
15. Alzano                     31                Reinstated after play off
16. Reggiana                   30
17. Brescello                  28                Relegated to Serie C2 (after play off)
----------------------------------
18. Alessandria                25                Relegated to Serie C2

== Group B ==
    Team                    Points
 1. PALERMO                    64                Promoted to Serie B
----------------------------------
 2. MESSINA                    61                Promoted to Serie B (after play off)
 3. Catania                    58
 4. Avellino                   57
 5. Ascoli                     54
----------------------------------
 6. Savoia (BANKRUPTCY)        54
 7. Torres                     53
 8. Castel di Sangro           47
 9. L'Aquila                   46
10. Fermana                    42
11. Giulianova                 42
12. Vis Pesaro                 39
13. Benevento                  39
----------------------------------
14. Lodigiani                  39
15. Nocerina                   36                Reinstated after play off
16. Viterbese                  29
17. Atletico Catania           27                Relegated to Serie C2 (after play out)
----------------------------------
18. Fidelis Andria             27                Relegated to Serie C2

== Play-off ==
- Gir. A:
  - Arezzo-Livorno 1–3; 0–2
  - Spezia-Como 0–1; 0–0
    - Livorno-Como 0-0; 0-1 dts
- Gir. B:
  - Ascoli-Messina 1–0; 1–2
  - Avellino-Catania 1–0; 0–2
    - Catania-Messina 1-1; 0–1

== Play-off to C2 ==
- Girone A
  - Brescello-Carrarese 2-2; 0–0
  - Reggiana-Alzano 2–1; 0;0 (Annulled)
- Girone B
  - Atletico Catania-Lodigiani 3–4; 0–2
  - Viterbese-Nocerina 1–0; 1-1 (Annulled)

== Title’s Supercup ==
20 and 24 May 2001

- Palermo-Modena 0–2
- MODENA-Palermo 3–0

== References and sources ==
- Almanacco Illustrato del Calcio - La Storia 1898-2004, Panini Edizioni, Modena, September 2005

Specific
