= Rinaldo Cruzado =

Peruvian footballer (born 1984)

Personal information
- Full name: Paulo Rinaldo Cruzado Durand
- Date of birth: 21 September 1984 (age 42)
- Place of birth: Lima, Peru
- Height: 1.80 m (5 ft 11 in)
- Position: Midfielder

Youth career
- 1992-1998: Academia Tito Drago
- 1999-2001: Alianza Lima

Senior career*
Years	Team	Apps	(Gls)
2002–2006	Alianza Lima	115	(5)
2007–2008	Grasshopper	35	(2)
2008	Sporting Cristal	14	(0)
2009–2010	Esteghlal	18	(1)
2010–2011	Juan Aurich	28	(4)
2011–2013	Chievo	25	(1)
2013–2014	Newell's Old Boys	19	(3)
2014	Nacional	11	(1)
2015–2017	Universidad César Vallejo	41	(7)
2017–2020	Alianza Lima	102	(9)
Total		408	(35)

International career
2003–2016	Peru	44	(2)
Medal record
Representing Peru
Association football
Copa América
Bronze medal – third place	Argentina 2011
- * Club domestic league appearances and goals

Paulo Rinaldo Cruzado Durand (born 21 September 1984) is a Peruvian professional footballer who plays as a midfielder.

== Club career ==
=== Alianza Lima ===
Born in Lima, Cruzado came up through the youth ranks of Academia Tito Drago. In 2002, he joined Alianza Lima. Later in the 2002 season he made his Peruvian Primera División debut for Alianza Lima, which was his only appearance that year. He eventually established himself as an important player for Alianza and together with a young Jefferson Farfán went on to claim the 2003 Peruvian Primera División League title. Again in the 2004 season he helped Alianza win the 2004 Peruvian League title. He made his Copa Libertadores debut on 11 February 2004 in a group stage match against São Paulo FC, which finished in a 2–1 loss for Alianza. He played in all of the group stage matches in the 2004 Copa Libertadores. However, Alianza were eliminated in that stage as they only managed to finish in third place. In the 2005 season, he played 35 games and scored 1 goal, but with the departure of key players like Jefferson Farfán and Walter Vilchez Alianza finished in 7th place in the overall standings. The next season Cruzado made the most appearances for Alianza in all his time there, with 42 games played and 3 goals scored. That year in the 2006 season he formed a strong partnership in midfield with Marko Ciurlizza and won his third Peruvian League title with Alianza. Cruzado played an important role in the final two-legged tie that determined the champions of the 2006 season. The first leg was won by Cienciano 1–0 in Cusco. In the second leg, Cruzado helped Alianza turn the tie around and defeat Cienciano 3–1 in Matute, with the winning goal being scored by teammate Flavio Maestri.

=== Grasshopper Club Zürich ===
In January 2007, he left Alianza and transferred to Swiss team Grasshopper Club Zürich. He made his Swiss League debut on 10 February 2007 in a goal-less draw against FC Zürich.. He scored his first goal in a 2–0 win against Neuchâtel Xamax on 23 February 2008. His second goal was against FC Sion also in a 2–0 win, on 10 May 2008.

=== Sporting Cristal ===
In August 2008, Cruzado left Grasshoppers and joined Sporting Cristal for the end of the 2008 Peruvian Primera División. He helped Cristal finish the season in second place in the overall standings.

=== Esteghlal ===
Cruzaldo played for Sporting Cristal until January 2009 when he joined Esteghlal in Iran which is one of the most popular football teams in Asia. The details of his transfer to this famous Iranian football club had not been revealed until the very last minutes. He was expected to play in the AFC Champions League 2009. He had a very serious injury during his first season which he just played few minuted for the club, but in his second season he was available for more matches and became one of the regular starting players. He left Iran seeking to return to a Peruvian club, possibly Alianza Lima, in 2010.

=== Club Juan Aurich ===
On 15 July 2010, Cruzado joined Peruvian club Juan Aurich in the middle of the 2010 Torneo Descentralizado season. His choice to return to Peru was mainly due to his desire to be called up by new coach Sergio Markarián to the Peru national team. Cruzado made his official debut for Juan Aurich on 21 August 2010 in a league match away to José Gálvez FBC. The manager Juan Reynoso put Rinaldo in the 79th minute to secure the 1–0 victory. The following match he made his home debut at the Estadio Elías Aguirre against Colegio Nacional Iquitos, which he played the entire match as it finished in a 1–1 draw. Cruzado quickly won a starting role in the center of midfield and managed to play in all but one of the remaining matches of the 2010 Descentralizado season. He played his last match of the season at home against Cusco club Cienciano. He received a red card in the 73rd minute as did his teammate Juan Carlos La Rosa in 46th minute, and eventually the match finished in a 3–2 win for Cienciano. Juan Aurich finished the season in 6th place in the Aggregate table.

Cruzado started the 2011 Torneo Descentralizado season in Round 2 at home against Unión Comercio. In this match Rinaldo scored his first official goal for Juan Aurich in the 73rd minute, which helped his side win 3–2 over Unión Comercio. Away to the defending champions Universidad San Martin, Cruzado won a penalty that was converted by teammate Luis Tejada to salvage a 1–1 draw in third round. Rinaldo was on the score sheet again by scoring the winning goal from outside the area with a powerful left-footed shot in the 2–0 home win against León de Huánuco, the Runners-up of the league the previous season. Away to the Miguel Grau Stadium, Cruzado then helped his club earn three important points in the 5–0 thrashing of Sport Boys by scoring the third goal of the night. As a regular starter he continued to help Juan Aurich make a bid for the title that season. In Round 9 against direct competitors Alianza Lima, Cruzado helped Juan Aurich defeat his former club 2–0, and two rounds later Juan Aurich won another three valuable points with a 2–1 home win against his other former club Sporting Cristal. Cruzado scored his last goal for Juan Aurich in Round 12 in the 2–1 loss away to Cienciano. His last appearance for the Chiclayo based club was in Round 15 at home against Universidad César Vallejo, which he played the entire match and finished in a 2–0 win for his side. At this midpoint stage of the season Juan Aurich was in third place behind Alianza Lima and Cienciano. Juan Aurich would eventually go on to win the title that season for the first time in the club's history. Cruzado was called up to participate in the Copa América, and during this time journalist Daniel Peredo first announced the news that Cruzado would join Italian club ChievoVerona after the summer tournament.

=== Chievo ===
On 5 August 2011, Cruzado left Juan Aurich and transferred to Serie A club ChievoVerona for the start of the 2011–12 season. He signed a three-year contract and chose to wear the number eight shirt as reported by Chievo's official website. On 13 August 2011, he made his debut for Chievo in a 45-minute summer friendly match against Novara, which ended in a 2–0 loss for his side. Cruzado then played his second match for Chievo on 27 August 2011 in a friendly match against Inter Milan in Monza. He entered the match at the start of the second half for club captain Sergio Pellissier when the score was still 0–0. In the end, Cruzado helped ChievoVerona defeat Inter 3–2. Cruzado made his Serie A debut on 11 September 2011 at home in the Bentegodi stadium against Novara for the second round (the first round was suspended) of the 2011–12 Serie A season. He entered the match in the 66th minute replacing Paolo Sammarco and eventually the match finished in a 2–2 draw. Cruzado made his Coppa Italia debut on 11 January 2012 in the Round of 16 away to Udinese.

== International career ==
Rinaldo made his debut for the Peru national team on 27 August 2003 in a friendly match against Guatemala. His most recent appearance with Peru was in the 2011 Copa América. Cruzado scored his first goal for Peru on 2 September 2011 in a friendly match against Bolivia which was played in Lima. He scored his goal in the 36th minute by shooting a powerful left-footed shot into the top right corner from about 25 yards away.

== Career statistics ==
As of 12 January 2012

=== Club ===
Appearances and goals by club, season and competition
Club	Season	League			National cup (Note: Includes Swiss Cup, Hazfi Cup, Coppa Italia.)		Continental		Total	
Club	Season	Division	Apps	Goals	Apps	Goals	Apps	Goals	Apps	Goals
Alianza Lima	2002	Peruvian Primera División	1	0			0	0	1	0
Alianza Lima	2003	Peruvian Primera División	12	0			0	0	12	0
Alianza Lima	2004	Peruvian Primera División	35	1			6	0	41	1
Alianza Lima	2005	Peruvian Primera División	25	1			0	0	25	1
Alianza Lima	2006	Peruvian Primera División	42	3					42	3
Alianza Lima	Total		115	5	0	0	6	0	121	5
Grasshoppers	2006–07	Swiss Super League	8	0	0	0	0	0	8	0
Grasshoppers	2007–08	Swiss Super League	26	2	3	0			29	2
Grasshoppers	2008–09	Swiss Super League	1	0			2	0	3	0
Grasshoppers	Total		35	2	3	0	2	0	40	2
Sporting Cristal	2008	Peruvian Primera División	14	0					14	0
Esteghlal	2008–09	Iran Pro League	1	0	0	0	0	0	1	0
Esteghlal	2009–10	Iran Pro League	17	1	1	1	2	0	20	2
Esteghlal	Total		18	1	1	1	2	0	21	2
Juan Aurich	2010	Peruvian Primera División	15	0					15	0
Juan Aurich	2011	Peruvian Primera División	13	4					13	4
Juan Aurich	Total		18	4	0	0	0	0	18	4
ChievoVerona	2011–12	Serie A	19	0	1	0			8	0
Career total			217	12	5	1	10	0	232	13

=== International ===
Scores and results list Peru's goal tally first, score column indicates score after each Cruzado goal.

List of international goals scored by Rinaldo Cruzado
No.	Date	Venue	Opponent	Score	Result	Competition
1	2 September 2011	Lima, Peru	Bolivia		2–2	Friendly
2	6 February 2013	Port of Spain, Trinidad and Tobago	Trinidad and Tobago		2–0	Friendly

== Honours ==
Alianza Lima

- Peruvian Primera División: 2003, 2004, 2006

Esteghlal

- Iran Pro League: 2008–09

Newell's Old Boys

- Argentine Primera División: 2013 Torneo Final

Peru

- Copa América bronze medal: 2011
