= Marcos de Paula =

Brazilian footballer

Personal information
- Full name: Marcos Ariel de Paula
- Date of birth: 19 December 1983 (age 42)
- Place of birth: Bariri, Brazil
- Height: 1.86 m (6 ft 1 in)
- Position: Striker

Youth career
- 2001: Bauru

Senior career*
Years	Team	Apps	(Gls)
2001–	Chievo	21	(2)
2001–2002	→ Milan (loan)	0	(0)
2003–2004	→ Cittadella (loan)	0	(0)
2004	→ Imolese (loan)	13	(4)
2004–2005	→ Belluno (loan)	18	(2)
2005	→ Benevento (loan)	13	(3)
2005–2006	→ Pro Sesto (loan)	18	(4)
2006	→ Martina (loan)	13	(4)
2006–2007	→ Manfredonia (loan)	9	(3)
2008	→ Foggia (loan)	14	(3)
2008–2009	→ Foligno (loan)	31	(14)
2011	→ Padova (loan)	22	(6)
2011–2012	→ Bari (loan)	14	(3)
2012–2013	→ Pro Vercelli (loan)	3	(0)
2014–2015	→ Lumezzane (loan)	20	(2)
2015	→ Messina (loan)	9	(0)
2015–2017	Atalanta	0	(0)
2016	→ Resende (loan)	1	(0)
- * Club domestic league appearances and goals as of 13 May 2015

Marcos Ariel de Paula (born 19 December 1983) is a Brazilian former football player who played as a striker.

== Career ==
De Paula was spotted by Chievo scouts while playing for Bauru in the 2001 Torneo di Viareggio. He was loaned to A.C. Milan for the 2001–02 season. He played for Milan Primavera during the 2002 Torneo di Viareggio, where he scored 4 goals Despite his good performance, the club decided not to sign him. De Paula made his professional debut in Italy, as a Chievo Verona player, during the 2002–03 season. He was later sent out on loan for nine consecutive seasons to a number of minor league (Lega Pro Prima Divisione and Lega Pro Seconda Divisione) teams; after a successful stint with Foligno in 2008–09, he finally managed to join Chievo's first team for the 2009–10 season, during which he also scored his first Serie A goals.

After only three appearances for Chievo in the 2010–11 season he joined Padova on loan until 30 June 2011.
