= Mattia Passarini =

Italian footballer

Personal information
- Date of birth: 29 July 1980 (age 46)
- Place of birth: Verona, Italy
- Height: 1.86 m (6 ft 1 in)
- Position: Goalkeeper

Youth career
- 1997–1999: Chievo
- 1999–2001: AC Fiorentina

Senior career*
Years	Team	Apps	(Gls)
2001–2008	Chievo	1	(0)
2001–2002	→ Sassuolo (loan)	30	(0)
2003–2004	→ Paternò (loan)	32	(0)
2004–2005	→ Ancona (loan)	21	(0)
2005–2006	→ Vittoria (loan)	11	(0)
2007	→ Cremonese (loan)	1	(0)
2009–2010	Cerea	21	(0)
- * Club domestic league appearances and goals

Mattia Passarini (born 29 July 1980) is an Italian former football goalkeeper.

== Football career ==
A Verona native, Passarini started his career at Chievo but spent much of it on loan to various clubs.

He played two seasons with the AC Fiorentina youth team, before leaving on loan to Sassuolo of Serie C2.

He spent a season with Chievo (2002–03), before going on loan to Paternò (Serie C1) and Ancona (Serie C2).

He spent another half season with Chievo since the summer of 2006, before going on loan again to Cremonese of Serie C1 in January 2007.

He finally made his Chievo and Serie B debut during 2007–08 season. That season he worked as Lorenzo Squizzi's backup along with Gabriele Aldegani.

He was released after the team won Serie B champion and promoted back to Serie A.
