= Davide Mandelli =

Italian footballer (born 1977)

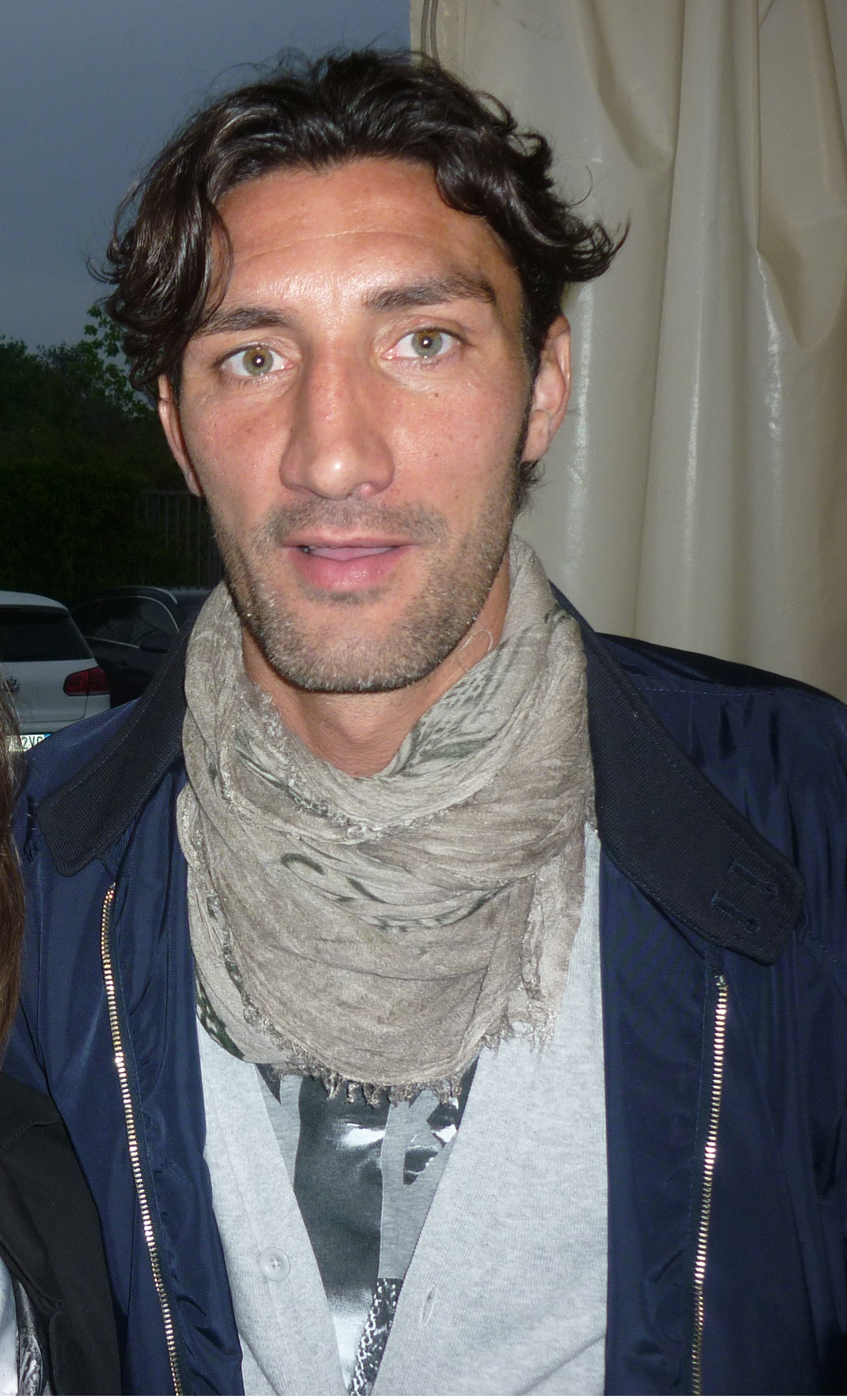
- Mandelli in 2012

Personal information
- Date of birth: 28 June 1977 (age 49)
- Place of birth: Monza, Italy
- Height: 1.90 m (6 ft 3 in)
- Position: Defender

Youth career
- –1995: Monza

Senior career*
Years	Team	Apps	(Gls)
1995–1997	Monza	0	(0)
1996–1997	→ Biellese (loan)	22	(0)
1997–1999	Biellese	66	(0)
1999–2000	Varese	31	(2)
2000–2004	Torino	51	(1)
2001–2003	→ Siena (loan)	65	(3)
2004–2012	Chievo	205	(9)
2012–2013	Lumezzane	34	(1)
Total		474	(16)
- * Club domestic league appearances and goals as of 9 December 2013

Davide Mandelli (born 28 June 1977) is a former Italian footballer who played as defender.

== Playing career ==
He started his career with his local club Monza. After playing with other lower league clubs, he joined Torino, followed by Siena and Chievo.

He made his European debut against S.C. Braga in 2006-07 UEFA Cup.

== Coaching career ==
Following retirement, Mandelli took on a coaching career alongside former teammate Michele Marcolini, working as his assistant on a number of clubs such as Real Vicenza, Pavia, Santarcangelo, Chievo and Novara.

He spent the 2021–22 season as assistant to Marcolini at AlbinoLeffe. On 24 May 2022 he was relinquished from his position, together with Marcolini and the whole coaching staff.

== Honours ==
=== Player ===
Biellese

- Campionato Nazionale Dilettanti: 1996–97

Torino

- Serie B: 2000–01

AC Siena

- Serie B: 2002–03

Chievo Verona

- Serie B: 2007–08
