= Santiago Morero =

Argentine footballer (born 1982)

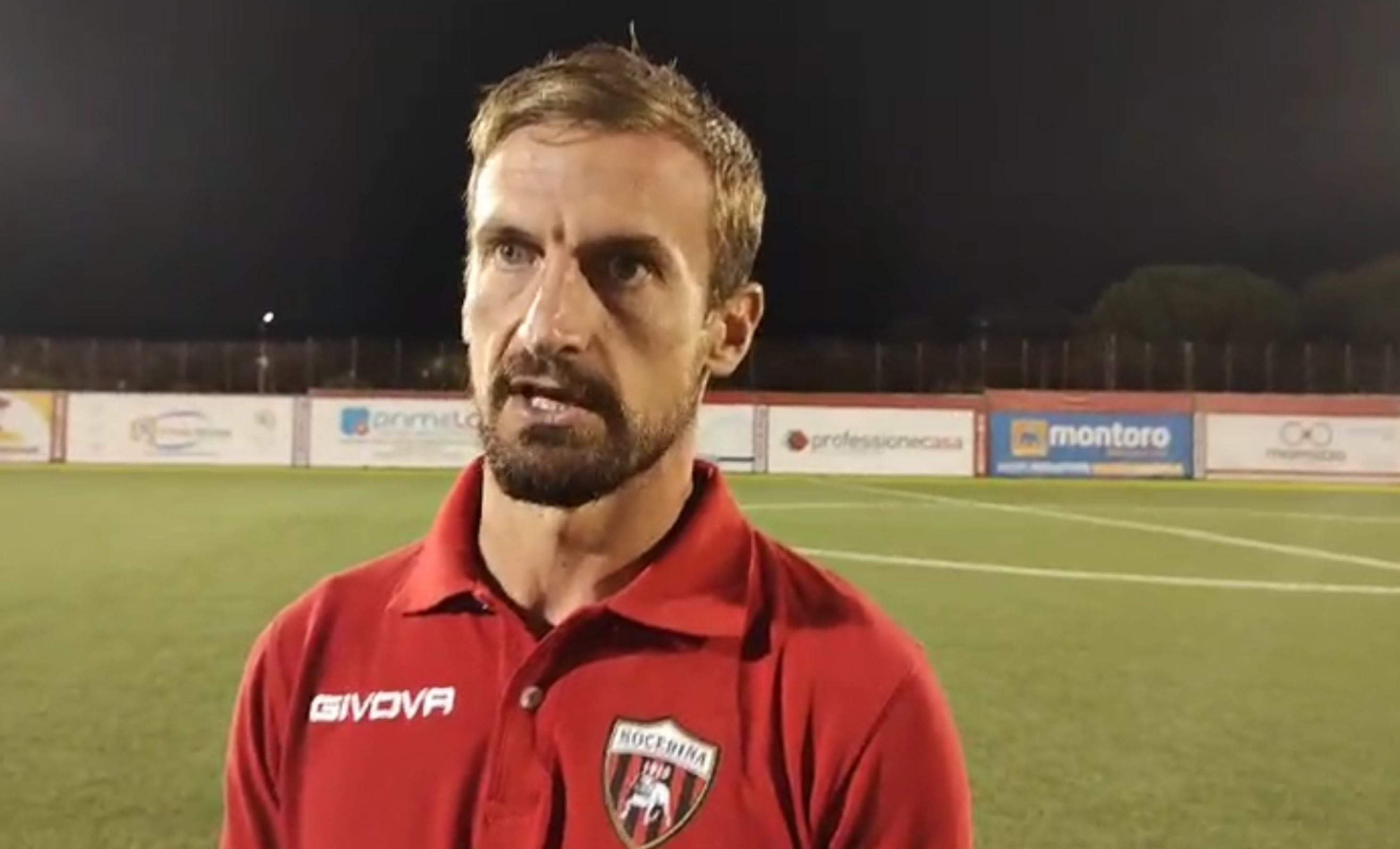

Personal information
- Full name: Santiago Eduardo Morero
- Date of birth: 18 April 1982 (age 44)
- Place of birth: Murphy, Santa Fe, Argentina
- Height: 1.83 m (6 ft 0 in)
- Position: Defender

Senior career*
Years	Team	Apps	(Gls)
2003–2005	Douglas Haig	52	(4)
2005–2008	Tigre	65	(1)
2008–2013	Chievo	58	(1)
2012–2013	→ Cesena (loan)	16	(1)
2013–2014	Siena	12	(0)
2014–2015	Grosseto	15	(1)
2015–2016	Alessandria	37	(2)
2016–2018	Juve Stabia	50	(1)
2018–2020	Avellino	64	(5)
2020–2021	Nocerina	30	(3)
- * Club domestic league appearances and goals

Santiago Eduardo Morero (born 18 April 1982) is an Argentine former footballer who played as a defender.

He also applied to register as a European Union citizen by claiming his Italian ancestry in 2008, in order to exclude from non-EU registration quota of Serie A.

== Biography ==
=== Argentina ===
Morero started his playing career with Club Atlético Douglas Haig in 2003, where he played in Torneo Argentino A, the regional league and the third level of Argentine football.

In 2005 Morero joined Club Atlético Tigre, in 2007 the club were promoted to the Argentine Primera División. The 2007–08 "Apertura" season was Tigre's first season in the Primera División since 1980, and Morero's first taste of top flight football. Morero was a key member of the first team, playing in nearly all of Tigre's games. The club finished in 2nd place which was the highest league finish in their history.

=== Italy ===
On 1 September 2008, he was signed by Chievo, in although he played a few friendlies for Udinese, the club did not signed him.

On 15 December 2008, he played his first Serie A match against F.C. Internazionale Milano.

On 15 July 2009 he signed a new 4-year contract with Chievo.

On 26 July 2013 Morero left for Serie B club Siena in a 2-year deal. After the bankruptcy of Siena in 2014, he was signed by Lega Pro club Grosseto. On 20 January 2015 he was signed by Alessandria. Alessandria finished as the 5th of Group A of Lega Pro, while finished as the 11th of Group B. However, Grosseto also bankrupted in 2015. With Alessandria, they finished as the 4th of Group A of Lega Pro.

In the summer of 2016 was signed by Juve Stabia.

On 1 September 2020 he joined Nocerina.
