= Ivan Fatić =

Montenegrin footballer

Personal information
- Date of birth: 21 August 1988 (age 38)
- Place of birth: Pljevlja, SFR Yugoslavia
- Height: 1.88 m (6 ft 2 in)
- Position: Centre back

Youth career
- 2005–2006: Red Star Belgrade
- 2006–2007: Chiasso
- 2007: Chievo
- 2007–2008: Inter Milan

Senior career*
Years	Team	Apps	(Gls)
2007–2009	Inter Milan	0	(0)
2008–2009	→ Vicenza (loan)	7	(0)
2009	→ Salernitana (loan)	17	(0)
2009–2011	Genoa	10	(1)
2010–2011	→ Cesena (loan)	2	(0)
2011–2013	Chievo	0	(0)
2011–2012	→ Empoli (loan)	3	(0)
2012–2013	→ Verona (loan)	4	(0)
2013	→ Lecce (loan)	3	(0)
2013	Vojvodina	2	(0)
2014	Rudar Pljevlja	12	(1)
2015	Sarawak FA	25	(3)
2016–2017	Sloboda Tuzla	9	(0)
2017	Shkupi	4	(0)
2018–2019	Samtredia	3	(0)
2019	Buxoro	6	(0)

International career
2007–2010	Montenegro U21	9	(0)
2009–2011	Montenegro	6	(0)
- * Club domestic league appearances and goals

Ivan Fatić (Cyrillic: Иван Фaтић, pronounced [ǐʋan fǎtiːtɕ]; born 21 August 1988) is a Montenegrin former professional football player who played as a defender or midfielder. He was manager in youth categories of Rudar Pljevlja. In October 2025, he became owner of Rudar Pljevlja.

== Club career ==
=== Italy ===
Fatić signed for Italian Serie A side Inter Milan from relegated Chievo on 4 July 2007, for €170,000. Chievo still hold half of the player's registration rights.

He made his first team (official match) debut against Reggina Calcio on 19 December 2007, a Coppa Italia match, he also played the return leg. On 9 June 2008, Inter Milan announced that they had loaned Fatić to Vicenza for the 2008–09 season.

In June 2009, Genoa bought half of the rights of the defender from Chievo after Chievo had bought Inter's 50% stake in the player. It was part of the deal that Diego Milito and Thiago Motta move to Internazionale. Half of its contractual value was valued €200,000 at that time. He spent a season with Genoa and played as a fullback or wing back in 3–5–2 formation. This co-ownership deal was renewed on 26 July 2010 with Fatić to remain with Genoa. However, he subsequently moved on loan to Cesena for the 2010–11 season.

In June 2011 Chievo bought back Fatić for €200,000. That week Genoa also sold defender Francesco Acerbi to Chievo for €2 million as part of the deal that Kévin Constant joined Genoa for €7.8 million. On 31 August 2011, Fatić left for Empoli. After returning from Empoli, Chievo again sent Fatić to Serie B, this time on loan to Hellas Verona.

On 31 January 2013 he was signed by Lecce.

=== Serbia ===
On 28 July 2013 Fatić returned to Serbia for Vojvodina in 2+1 year contract. On 10 October 2013 the contract was terminated.

=== Malaysia and Bosnia-Herzegovina ===
In November 2014, he was signed by Sarawak FA to play in Malaysia Super League. He played for 25 games and scored 3 goals before moving to Bosnian club, FK Slobodan Tuzla, on 1 July 2016 where he appeared in 10 games and scored 1 goal for them.

== International career ==
Fatić made his debut for Montenegro in a June 2009 FIFA World Cup qualification match away against Cyprus. He earned a total of six caps. His final international was a June 2011 European Championship qualification match against Bulgaria.
