= Marco Malagò =

Italian footballer

Personal information
- Full name: Marco Malagò
- Date of birth: December 30, 1978 (age 47)
- Place of birth: Venice, Italy
- Height: 1.83 m (6 ft 0 in)
- Position: Defender

Youth career
- Venezia

Senior career*
| Years | Team | Apps | (Gls) |
| 1995–1997 | Venezia | 6 | (0) |
| 1997–1999 | Cosenza | 52 | (2) |
| 1999–2003 | Genoa | 102 | (6) |
| 2003–2011 | Chievo | 125 | (1) |
| 2010 | → Siena (loan) | 6 | (0) |
| 2010–2011 | → Triestina (loan) | 31 | (0) |
| 2011– | Lumezzane | 0 | (0) |

International career^{‡}
| 1995 | Italy U-16 | 4 | (0) |
| 1995–1996 | Italy U-18 | 7 | (0) |
- * Club domestic league appearances and goals as of 20 May 2011 ‡ National team caps and goals as of N/A

Marco Malagò (born 30 December 1978 in Venice, Italy) is a retired Italian footballer.

From January 2010 to July 2011, he left Chievo on loan. At first he joined Siena but the team relegated. After Triestina re-admitted to 2010–11 Serie B, he joined the team.
