= Girgis =

Girgis is a surname, that derives from the given name Girgis, an Arabic form of Geōrgios (English: George). People with this surname are usually Coptic Christians.

People with this surname include:

- Angele Ishag Girgis (born 1937), Sudanese teacher
- Falco Girgis, developer of the game Elysian Shadows
- Habib Girgis (1876–1951), dean of the Catechetical School of Alexandria
- Luke Girgis, Australian musician and businessman
- Sarah Girgis, executive producer of 2021 American television documentary Wendy Williams: What a Mess!

== See also ==
- Alessio Girgi (born 2000), Italian professional footballer
- Mikhail Girgis El Batanouny (1873–1957), expert in Coptic hymns
