= FC Clivense =

Serie D football club in Chievo, Italy

Clivense
- Full name: Football Club Clivense San Martino; Società Sportiva Dilettantistica
- Founded: 2021
- Dissolved: 2024 (merged with Chievo)
- Stadium: Stadio Comunale; San Martino Buon Albergo
- Capacity: 1,100
- President: Sergio Pellissier
- 2023–24: Serie D Group B, 9th of 20
- Website: fcclivense.it

Football Club Clivense was an Italian former football club based in Chievo, in Verona. It was founded on 13 August 2021 by Sergio Pellissier, former captain of the defunct football club Chievo. It competed in Serie D, the fourth level of Italian football.

In May 2024, the club formally changed its denomination to Chievo after having successfully acquired the logo and naming rights of the original club.

== History ==
After Chievo was barred from registering to Serie B due to financial reasons in 2021, former captain Sergio Pellissier decided to found a new club himself, originally named Chievo 2021.

The club was renamed to Clivense following a legal warning from Chievo. Clivense was first admitted to the Terza Categoria, the lowest level of amateur football in Italy, winning the title by the end of the season.

In the summer of 2022, the team was able to climb up to the Eccellenza, acquiring the sporting title of neighbours San Martino Speme and winning promotion to the 2023–24 Serie D as champions of their group.

On 10 May 2024, following a mid-table placement in the Serie D season, the club successfully acquired the logo and naming rights of the original Chievo club in an auction.

Later on 29 May, Clivense formally changed its denomination to the original Chievo.

== Stadium ==
Clivense play their home matches at the 1,500-capacity Stadio Comunale, known for sponsorship reasons as Phoenix Arena and located in the municipality of San Martino Buon Albergo.

== Managers ==
- (Italy) Riccardo Allegretti (13 August 2021 – 30 June 2024)

== Honours ==
Eccellenza Veneto

- Winners: 2022–2023 (group A)

Terza Categoria Veneto

- Winners: 2021–2022 (group B)
