= Riccardo Allegretti =

Italian footballer (born 1978)

Personal information
- Full name: Riccardo Gianni Allegretti
- Date of birth: 15 February 1978 (age 48)
- Place of birth: Milan, Italy
- Height: 1.71 m (5 ft 7 in)
- Position: Midfielder

Youth career
- 1995–1996: AC Milan

Senior career*
Years	Team	Apps	(Gls)
1996–1998	Lecco	55	(1)
1998–2001	Empoli	40	(0)
1999	→ Reggiana (loan)	11	(0)
2001–2003	Como	54	(3)
2003–2005	Modena	18	(1)
2004	→ Chievo (loan)	8	(0)
2005	→ Venezia (loan)	19	(2)
2005	Avellino	16	(0)
2006–2009	Triestina	119	(18)
2009–2010	Bari	16	(3)
2010–2011	Grosseto	20	(1)
2011–2012	Triestina	27	(6)
2012–2014	Barletta	26	(4)
2014	Monza	10	(2)
2014–2015	Benevento	5	(0)
2015	Monza	0	(0)
Total		444	(41)

Managerial career
- 2015–2017: Città di Cologno
- 2017–2019: FC Primorje
- 2021–2024: FC Clivense
- 2024–2025: ChievoVerona
- * Club domestic league appearances and goals

Riccardo Gianni Allegretti (born 15 February 1978) is a former Italian footballer and current coach.

== Playing career ==
He made his Serie A debut on 14 September 2002 against Empoli. He also played over 200 games in Serie B. Allegretti was the captain of Triestina.

In July 2009, he was signed by Bari along with teammate Filippo Antonelli.

In 2010, he left for Serie B club Grosseto. On 31 August 2011, Grosseto announced that he was transferred to U.S. Triestina Calcio. The club was newly relegated to 2011–12 Lega Pro Prima Divisione. Triestina went bankrupt and folded at the end of the season, and Allegretti became a free agent.

On 30 November 2012, Allegretti was signed by another third division club Barletta. He made his debut in the following match day (2 December).

He extended his contract on 12 July 2013.

== Coaching career ==
Following retirement, he took on a coaching career, starting with newly-founded amateur club Città di Cologno, starting in the Terza Categoria league (at the very bottom of the Italian football pyramid), and leading them to promotion to Seconda Categoria in his first season.

He successively took on at amateur Promozione club FC Primorje, winning promotion to Eccellenza in his second season. In the summer of 2019, after obtaining the UEFA A coaching badges, he returned to Monza as a youth coach, first in charge of the Under-17 and then of the Under-19 Primavera squad.

On 6 September 2021, he was unveiled as the new head coach of FC Chievo 2021 (then renamed FC Clivense for legal reasons), a new club founded by Sergio Pellissier and admitted to Terza Categoria following the exclusion of his and Allegretti's former team A.C. ChievoVerona from Serie B. In the following season, after Clivense's acquisition of Eccellenza club San Martino Speme, which led to the former occupying a slot in the fifth tier of Italian football, Allegretti was confirmed head coach, with Pablo Granoche as his assistant.

In his second season in charge of Clivense, he led the Verona-based club to win the league title, thus ensuring promotion to Serie D. He departed from Clivense by the end of the season, only to return in charge of the team, now called ChievoVerona, on 9 October 2024.

On 1 August 2025, Allegretti suddenly departed from ChievoVerona with immediate effect due to family reasons.
