= Alberto Malesani =

Italian football manager (born 1954)

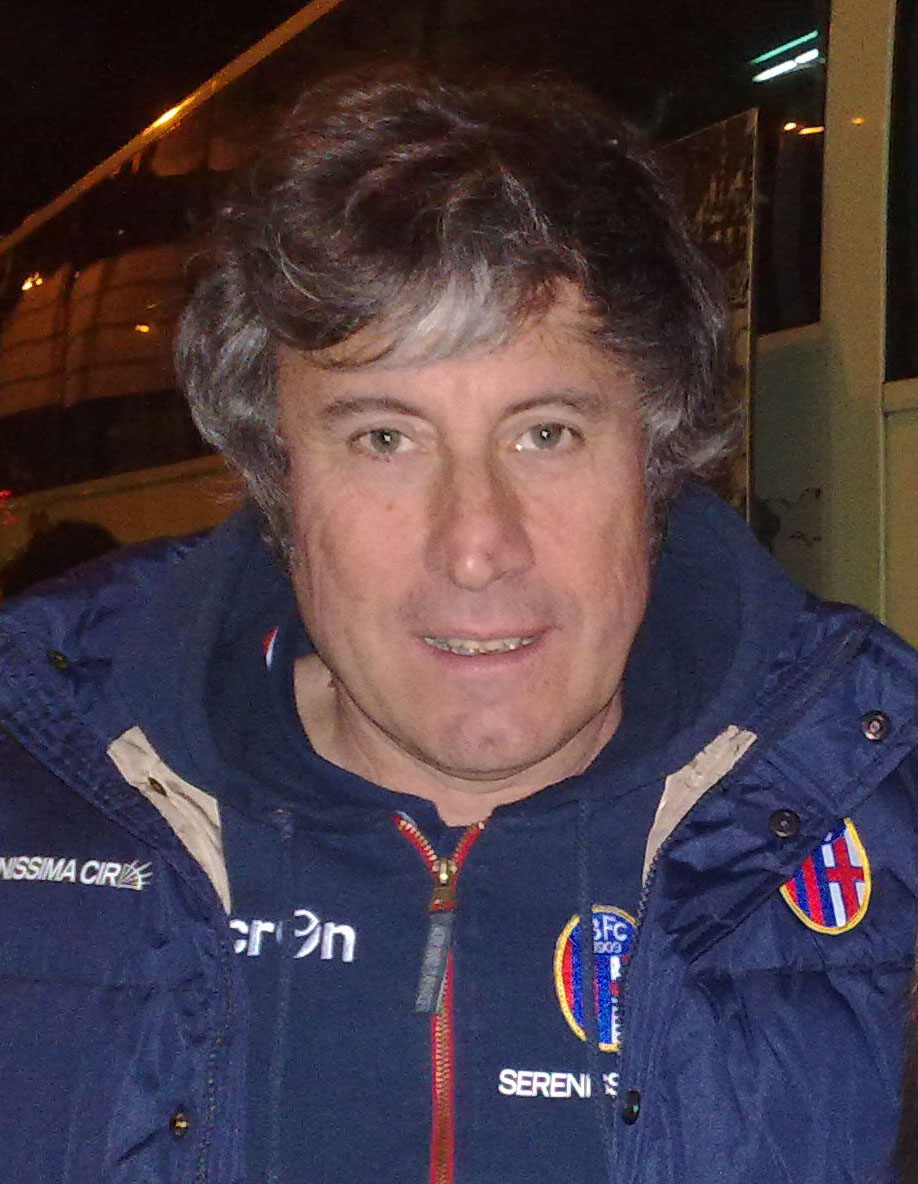
- Malesani with Bologna in 2010

Personal information
- Date of birth: 5 June 1954 (age 72)
- Place of birth: Verona, Italy
- Height: 1.79 m (5 ft 10 in)
- Position: Midfielder

Youth career
- Audace S. Michele
- 1970: Vicenza

Senior career*
Years	Team	Apps	(Gls)
- Audace S. Michele

Managerial career
- 1987–1990: Chievo (junior)
- 1990–1991: Chievo (youth)
- 1991–1993: Chievo (assistant)
- 1993–1997: Chievo
- 1997–1998: Fiorentina
- 1998–2001: Parma
- 2001–2003: Verona
- 2003–2004: Modena
- 2005–2006: Panathinaikos
- 2007: Udinese
- 2007–2008: Empoli
- 2009–2010: Siena
- 2010–2011: Bologna
- 2011: Genoa
- 2012: Genoa
- 2013: Palermo
- 2014: Sassuolo
- * Club domestic league appearances and goals

Alberto Malesani (Italian pronunciation: [alˈbɛrto maleˈzaːni]; born 5 June 1954) is an Italian football manager and former player. As a manager, he is mostly remembered for his successful spell with Parma during the late 1990s, with whom they won the Coppa Italia, the UEFA Cup, and the Supercoppa Italiana.

== Playing career ==
Malesani played as a midfielder throughout his career; although he was known for his good feet and tactical sense, his performances were often inconsistent and limited by his lack of pace and movement, and he spent his brief and unremarkable playing career in the lower divisions of Italian football. Malesani's career as player was mostly spent on a Veronese amateur team Audace S. Michele, where he obtained a promotion from Serie D to Serie C in 1976–77, appearing fourteen times during the season. He retired from playing football at the age of 24.

== Managerial career ==
=== Early career and breakthrough at Chievo ===
Upon retiring, Malesani worked at Canon in Amsterdam, where he studied the Ajax Amsterdam total football training methods. His passion for coaching was so great, that on his honeymoon, he decided to go and watch Johan Cruyff's coaching sessions at Barcelona.

Malesani left his job at Canon in 1990 order to pursue a coaching career at Serie C1 team Chievo for the Allievi youth squad. In 1991, he is assistant of head coach Carlo De Angelis in the first team, and in 1993 he becomes head coach himself. His first season as head coach ended in a historical promotion to Serie B for then-unknown Chievo.

=== Fiorentina, Parma and UEFA Cup triumph ===
Malesani left Chievo in 1997, after three Serie B seasons and a narrowly missed promotion in the Serie A league in order to become Fiorentina's boss, in what was his first stint in the Italian top flight.

A good Fiorentina season convinced Parma to appoint Malesani as new head coach in 1998, where he won a Coppa Italia, a UEFA Cup, an Italian Super Cup and obtained two fourth places before being sacked during the 2000–01 season.

=== From Verona to Panathinaikos and Udinese ===
After losing his job at Parma, Malesani then coached Verona and Modena, failing to save the clubs from relegation in both cases; successively he moved abroad to coach Greek side Panathinaikos. Panathinaikos remains the club with the highest percentage of wins in Malesani's career to date (60%).

Malesani was appointed coach of Udinese in January 2007, as replacement for Giovanni Galeone. He led his side to tenth place in the 2006–07 Serie A final table, only seven points far from relegation, being not confirmed for the following season. On 27 November 2007 he was unveiled as Empoli's new head coach, replacing Luigi Cagni. He was axed on 31 March 2008 following a 2–0 home defeat to Sampdoria which left Empoli down in last place in the league table.

=== From Siena to Bologna ===
On 23 November 2009, he was appointed as the new head coach of Siena, replacing Marco Baroni. On 21 May 2010, was released by Siena.

On 1 September 2010, he signed a one-year contract at Bologna. After a successful season, which saw his club finish in 16th place, six points clear of relegation, despite a three-point deduction for tax problems and running feuds over the club's ownership, Malesani was replaced by Pierpaolo Bisoli on 26 May 2011.

=== Genoa ===
On 19 June 2011, Genoa officially announced that Malesani would be the new first team head coach. However, after Genoa was defeated 6-1 by Napoli, Malesani was fired. He returned to Genoa on 2 April 2012, taking over from Pasquale Marino who had previously replaced him only to be sacked a few months later. His second stint as Genoa boss lasted however only twenty days, as he was sacked once again on 22 April after a 1–4 home loss to Siena that left Genoa one point shy of relegation, and led to massive protests from Genoa fans during the game.

=== Palermo ===
On 5 February 2013, Malesani was appointed as the manager of Palermo.

However, after three matches in charge, on 24 February 2013, Malesani was relieved from his duties as the manager.

=== Sassuolo ===
On 29 January 2014, it was announced Malesani had agreed to take over as new manager of Serie A team Sassuolo.

== Controversy ==
=== Hellas Verona ===
On 18 November 2001, after winning the first historical Serie A derby between Verona and Chievo with the result of 3–2, Malesani wildly ran and celebrated in front of the tiers reserved to Verona supporters, even getting on his knees. His behaviour was criticized, but Malesani fought back during Monica Vanali's post-match interview, arguing about his colleagues using stock phrases, claiming his managerial wins and defending his conduct, which he had anticipated to the opponent's manager Gigi Delneri.

Tutti là così, che fumano, che stanno fermi, che fanno "Attenti"! Ma dai, basta! (...) Il problema è questo: nel calcio - no? - oggigiorno, bisogna essere finti, bisogna essere fatti proprio con- di plastica, essere così, guarda! [Imitating a mannequin] Intervistami, Monica! Eccolo qua! Dai, fammi una domanda! (...) L'ultimo allenatore in Europa che son stato che ha vinto, dighelo, che se lo ricorda, nessuno lo dice! Mai uno, in due anni, Monica, mai uno che l'ha detto! (...) Mai 'na voce fora dal coro, mai una, mai una che dica: "Ma sì, Malesani, corri cazzo, correte allenatori!" Ma basta, è vergognoso! (...) Davanti a una platea gli ho detto: "Gigi, non arrabbiarti, se vinco, vado sotto la curva!"

— [Managers] are all like that, smokers, still, on their toes! Come on, stop it! (...) The problem is the following: in the football world - right? - nowadays, you need to be a pretender, you need to be made with- of plastic, to be like this, look at me! [Imitating a mannequin] Interview me, Monica! Here it is! Come on, ask me a question! (...) The last [Italian] manager winning in Europe, tell them, remind that, no one says that! No one, in two years, no one said that! (...) Never a lone voice, not a single one, never one saying: "All right, Malesani, fucking run, run you managers!" Stop it, it's a shame! (...) In front of an audience, I told him: "Gigi, don't get angry, if I win, I 'll go celebrating in front of the [Verona] tiers!"

=== Panathinaikos ===
On 16 December 2005, after a disappointing 2–2 draw against Iraklis, Malesani held a roaring press conference. Tired of the criticisms he and Panathinaikos had received for some poor performances both from press and supporters, he defended his hard work and dedication, as well as the club's owner Giannis Vardinogiannis, in front of the journalists.

Perché ci deve essere sempre un resp- un deficiente di turno qua, che paga per tutti cazzo? 12 anni, 24 allenatori: eh cazzo sarà mica sempre l’allenatore qua che deve pagare? Sempre l’allenatore? I tifosi diano una mano alla squadra oggi, invece di contestarla, che sono giovani, abbiamo fatto una squadra- diano una mano! Abbiano i coglioni di dare una mano alla squadra! Io son là 24 ore al giorno io, 24 ore al giorno sono là io, tutti i giorni cazzo! Non è possibile una roba del genere, vergognatevi cazzo! E sono arrabbiato non perché ho pareggiato, sono arrabbiato perché è uno schifo ‘sta roba qua! Io non ho mai visto una roba del genere! Ma come- dove siamo cazzo? Cos’è diventato il calcio, una giungla cazzo? No, no, no, calma! E ridono! Cosa ridete, cosa? Vi divertite a scrivere cosa dopo? Cosa ridete che? Cosa ridete cazzo? Cosa ridete? Cosa ridete? Abbiate rispetto della gente! Con voi bisogna dire bugie e fare i ruffiani, come coi tifosi: io non lo sono cazzo! Ok? Io guardo tutti in faccia, tutti, dal primo all’ultimo, perché sono serio cazzo, vado a lavorare con serietà! No, no, parlo io adesso, finita qua! Cazzo! Parole? Parole di che? Dopo quattro mesi che giochi a calcio, parole! Ma fatemi un piacere, dai, su, cazzo! Fatemi un piacere! È ora di finirla qua, state calme tutti cazzo, state calmi! Non ho mai visto una roba del genere! Tutti presuntosi, ironici, ridono: “Ah eccolo, arriva il scemo di turno!” Qua si fanno le cose seriamente cazzo! (...) A me non me ne frega neanche se m’ammazzano, perché la coscienza ce l’ho a posto cazzo, lavoro 24 ore al giorno, fatela finita cazzo! Fatela finita! E domande del cazzo sempre! E la pubblico e qua e là! Si lavora, lasciate Mr. Varidoianis [right spelling: Vardinogiannis], ringraziate Mr. Varidoianis! Ringraziatelo cazzo! ‘Na brava persona! E aiutatelo Mr. Varidoianis cazzo! Non contestarlo il pubblico, cosa contesta che il pubblico, cosa vuoi contestare cazzo? Cosa contesta? Varidoianis? Ma se se ne- dopo se se ne va vedremo dopo cosa succede cazzo! Cosa contestiamo, Varidoianis qua? Ma dai, su, figa, su, basta!

— Why there always needs to be a resp- a moron here, being a fucking scapegoat? 12 years, 24 managers: will the manager always be the fucking scapegoat here? Always the manager? The supporters should give the team a hand instead of protesting, as [the players] are young, we built a team- help them out! Be so fucking brave to give the team a hand! I'm there 24 hours a day, I'm there 24 hours a day, every fucking day! Something like this is not possible, fucking shame on you! And I'm not angry because I tied the match, I'm angry because all of this is disgusting! I've never seen something like this! How- where are we? What has football become, a fucking jungle? No, no, no, be quiet! And they laugh! What are you laughing at, what? What do you enjoy writing then? What are you laughing at? What are you fucking laughing at? What are you laughing at? What are you laughing at? Respect people! One needs to tell lies and be a pander with you, I'm not like that, fuck! Ok? I look straight at everyone, everyone, from first to last, as I'm fucking serious, I go working seriously! No, no, now it's my turn, you're done! Fuck! Words? Words about what? After 4 months playing football, words! Don't be ridiculous, come on, fuck! Don't be ridiculous! It's time to cut it out, be quiet you all, be quiet! I've never seen something like this! Everyone being cocky, ironic, laughing: "Here he is, the new moron has come!" We do things fucking seriously here! (...) Should one even murder me, I don't care, because my conscience is fucking clear, I work 24 hours a day, fucking stop it! Stop it! And always idiot questions! The supporters, this way and that! We work, give a break to Mr. Varidoianis [right spelling: Vardinogiannis], give thanks to Mr. Varidoianis! Fucking give thanks to him! A nice person! And fucking help Mr. Varidoianis out! The supporters shouldn't blame him, what do they argue about, what the fuck do they argue about? What do they argue about? Varidoianis? If he leav- after he leaves we'll see what fucking happens then! What do we argue about here, Varidoianis? Come on, fuck, cut it out!

=== Siena ===
On 9 January 2010, after losing 4–3 a dramatic match at San Siro stadium against the Inter team which went on winning the treble, Malesani contested the foul leading to the free-kick Inter scored for the temporary 3-3. In particular, Malesani claimed that small teams have no protection in Serie A and big teams take advantage of that.

On 24 January 2010, after a 1–1 home draw against Cagliari, Siena President Massimo Mezzaroma declared his disappointment for the team performances in front of TV journalists. Following this statement, RAI host Enrico Varriale welcomed Malesani in the post-match interview calling him "allenatore che sta un po' sulla graticola" (Italian for "manager risking his job") and anticipated that Mezzaroma would have phoned him later. Malesani was left surprised and deeply embittered, especially because the discussion had immediately focused on off-the-pitch topics. He then reminded that Mezzaroma had said good things about him and that he was doing everything he could for the team, underlining the upsides of the draw.

=== Genoa ===
On 1 December 2011, Malesani got very annoyed by the journalists calling him "mollo" (Italian for "limp"). Consequently, he focused his press conference on proving his motivation and skills.

Demotivato, mollo, ma che mollo? Ma che- cosa dite? Mollo che? Ma che mollo? Ma quale mollo? Cioè cosa vuol dire "mollo" qua? Non capisco io. (...) Se uno resiste a 21 anni a questi livelli qua, non credo che sia tanto mollo. Un po' di rispetto anche lì! Che mollo? Siete molli voi quando dite quel- queste cose qua! Perché vi fa comodo dire 'ste cose qua, che uno è mollo! (...) Se sei mollo, non vai da nessuna parte, ok? Mollo non lo sono, mollo saranno gli altri! (...) Qual è il problema? Perché uno dice "mollo"? Ma mollo che? Ma siamo pazzi? (...) Avete vist- avete sentito una volta che mi son lamentato? "Il mollo"? Avete sentito "il mollo" che si lamenta? No, vuol dire che non son mollo. (...) Litigo a casa, litigo con tutti, non son mollo neanche qua. Anzi, sono più nervoso di tanti altri magari. (...) Io son fatto così, son un coraggioso, non sono un mollo.

— Demotivated, limp, me limp? Wha- What are you saying? Me limp? Me limp? Me limp? What does "limp" mean here? I don't get it. (...) If one manages to work for 21 years at this level, I don't think that he's so limp. A little bit of respect even there! Me limp? You are limp when you say things like thi- that! Because saying this kind of things, namely that I'm limp, is convenient for you! (...) If you're limp, you go nowhere, ok? I'm not limp, others could be limp! (...) What's the problem? Why does one say "limp"? Me limp? Are we crazy? (...) Have you see- have you heard me complaining once? "The limp one"? Have you heard "the limp one" complaining? No, you haven't, it means I'm not limp. (...) I fight at home, I fight with everyone, I'm not limp neither there. Actually, I'm more nervous than many others perhaps. (...) I'm like this, I'm brave, I'm not limp!

== Style of management ==
Nicknamed "Il Male" throughout his career, tactically, Malesani used an attacking style, which was inspired by the innovative style employed by Ajax during the 90s, who were coached by Dutch Manager Louis van Gaal, rather than the Italian styles popularised by Arrigo Sacchi and Nevio Scala, which were employed by many other managers in Serie A at the time, and which favoured a more balanced defensive approach. Like Van Gaal, Malesani often used a 3–4–3 formation. At Parma, he even used an asymmetrical 3–4–1–2 formation. In defence, he used an offensive sweeper in defence (Roberto Sensini) who would advance into midfield, a right-sided centre-back who would often join the attack and act as a full-back (Lilian Thuram) to assist with transitions of play, and a pure man-marking stopper as the left-sided centre-back (Fabio Cannavaro), who would mainly sit back and defend, providing balance to the team. In midfield, he used a box-to-box midfielder (Dino Baggio) who would assist at both ends, and an offensive playmaker (Stefano Fiore) behind the strikers (Enrico Chiesa and Hernán Crespo), as well as an all-round creative player in midfield (Juan Sebastián Verón), and an offensive right midfielder, who was also capable of drifting into the middle of the pitch (Diego Fuser), allowing for the right-sided centre-backs overlapping runs. Malesani also mimicked Van Gaal's use of a sweeper keeper at both Ajax and Barcelona (Gianluigi Buffon), who would not only rush out of his area to clear the ball away from danger, allowing the team to keep a high defensive line, but also build-up plays with short passes out from the back. The defenders would often play a high line, pressing forwards and covering the first 30 to 40 metres of the pitch with their anticipation and mobility. His Parma side were known for their vertical passing game, which was based on the midfield mainly controlling possession of the ball and starting plays, with Verón dictating play and often playing line-breaking passes. Off the ball, the team made use of pressing.

At Genoa, Malesani also used the 4–3–3 and the 4–3–1–2 formations.

Beyond his qualities as a coach, Malesani was also known for his motivational skills and his strong, controversial character.

== Managerial statistics ==
As of 2 March 2014

Managerial record by team and tenure
Team	Nat	From	To	Record							
Team	Nat	From	To	G	W	D	L	GF	GA	GD	Win %
Chievo	(Italy)	1 June 1993	17 June 1997	161	56	66	39	182	149	+33	34.78
Fiorentina	(Italy)	17 June 1997	30 June 1998	40	18	15	7	74	41	+33	45.00
Parma	(Italy)	30 June 1998	8 January 2001	126	63	33	30	213	130	+83	50.00
Verona	(Italy)	4 July 2001	10 June 2003	77	23	23	31	88	101	−13	29.87
Modena	(Italy)	10 June 2003	22 March 2004	30	6	10	14	25	39	−14	20.00
Panathinaikos	(Greece)	17 February 2005	15 May 2006	52	31	9	12	82	52	+30	59.62
Udinese	(Italy)	16 January 2007	4 June 2007	19	6	5	8	30	32	−2	31.58
Empoli	(Italy)	26 November 2007	31 March 2008	20	5	4	11	22	32	−10	25.00
Siena	(Italy)	23 November 2009	21 May 2010	26	6	7	13	29	47	−18	23.08
Bologna	(Italy)	1 September 2010	26 May 2011	40	13	11	16	42	56	−14	32.50
Genoa	(Italy)	19 June 2011	22 December 2011	18	8	3	7	26	29	−3	44.44
Genoa	(Italy)	2 April 2012	23 April 2012	3	0	2	1	3	6	−3	0.00
Palermo	(Italy)	5 February 2013	24 February 2013	3	0	3	0	2	2	+0	0.00
Sassuolo	(Italy)	29 January 2014	3 March 2014	5	0	0	5	3	9	−6	0.00
Total				620	235	191	194	821	725	+96	37.90

== Honours ==
Chievo

- Serie C1: 1993–94

Parma

- Coppa Italia: 1998–99
- UEFA Cup: 1998–99
- Supercoppa Italiana: 1999

== See also ==
- List of UEFA Cup winning managers
