= Edoardo Sbampato =

Italian footballer (born 1998)

Personal information
- Date of birth: 5 February 1998 (age 28)
- Place of birth: Isola della Scala, Italy
- Height: 1.85 m (6 ft 1 in)
- Position: Defender

Team information
- Current team: ChievoVerona
- Number: 4

Youth career
- –2017: Chievo

Senior career*
Years	Team	Apps	(Gls)
2017–2019	Chievo	0	(0)
2018	→ Virtus Francavilla (loan)	4	(0)
2018–2019	→ Alessandria (loan)	20	(1)
2019–2022	Paganese	72	(2)
2022–2024	Legnago	37	(0)
2024–2025	Treviso	35	(1)
2025–	ChievoVerona	16	(0)
- * Club domestic league appearances and goals as of 4 March 2026

Edoardo Sbampato (born 5 February 1998) is an Italian footballer who plays as a defender for Serie D club ChievoVerona.

== Club career ==
He made his Serie C debut for Virtus Francavilla on 4 February 2018 in a game against Rende.

On 30 July 2019, he signed a 2-year contract with Paganese.
