= 2023–24 Serie D =

Serie D
- Season: 2023–24
- Champions: Campobasso (1st title)
- Promoted: Alcione; Caldiero Terme; Union Clodiense Chioggia; Carpi; Pianese; Cavese; Team Altamura; Trapani
- Relegated: Alba; Pinerolo; PDHAE; Borgosesia; Legnano; Crema; Tritium; Cjarlins Muzane; Atletico Castegnato; Ponte San Pietro; Virtus Bolzano; Santo Stefano; Borgo San Donnino; Certaldo; Mezzolara; Sansepolcro; Real Forte Querceta; Mobilieri Ponsacco; Cenaia; Tivoli; Fano; Vastogirardi; Matese; Gladiator; Nuova Florida; Boreale; Budoni; Città di Gallipoli; Barletta; Bitonto; Santa Maria Cilento; San Luca; Castrovillari; Gioiese; Pistoiese (excluded); Lamezia Terme (excluded)

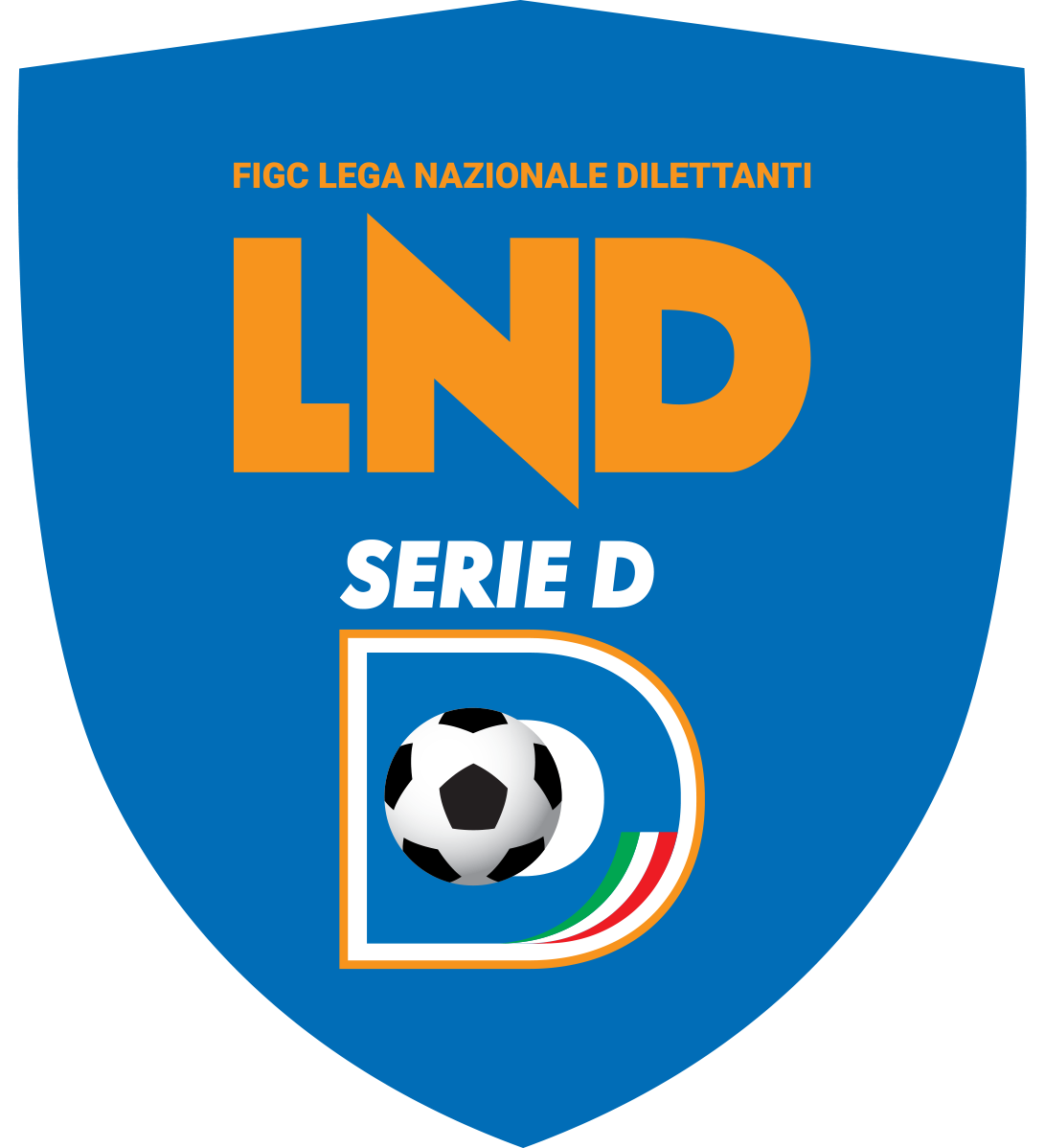

The 2023–24 Serie D was the seventy-fourth season of the top-level Italian non-professional football championship. It represents the fourth tier in the Italian football league system.

== Rules ==
The season will provide a total of nine promotions to Serie C (those being the winners of all nine groups). Teams placed between second and fifth for each group will play a so-called "playoff tournament," starting with two one-legged games played at the best-placed team's home venue:

- 2nd-placed team vs 5th-placed team;
- 3rd-placed team vs 4th-placed team.

In case of a draw by the end of the game, two extra times will be played; in case of no winner after that, the best-placed team will advance to the final.

The two winning teams will then play a one-legged final, to be hosted at the best-placed team's home venue, with the same rules as in the first round. The nine playoff winners for each group will be prioritized to fill any potential Serie C league vacancies.

The two bottom-placed teams for each league group are automatically relegated to Eccellenza. Two two-legged relegation playoff games (known in Italian as "play-out") will therefore be played between:

- 13th-placed team vs 16th-placed team (for 18-team groups), or 15th-placed team vs 18th-placed team (for 20-team groups);
- 14th-placed team vs 15th-placed team (for 18-team groups), or 16th-placed team vs 17th-placed team (for 20-team groups).

Two extra times will be played in case of an aggregate draw after the second leg; in case of a further aggregate draw, the worst-placed team will be relegated.

In case the two teams have a league gap of at least eight points, the relegation playoff will not take place and the worst-placed team will be automatically relegated instead.

== Teams ==
The league's composition involves nine divisions, grouped geographically and named alphabetically.

=== Readmissions ===
On 12 September 2023, the league committee announced that it had admitted La Fenice Amaranto as the phoenix club of Reggina after the latter's exclusion from Serie B, according to the Article 52 of N.O.I.F. regulations. The club was later renamed LFA Reggio Calabria.

=== Teams relegated from Serie C ===
The following teams were relegated from the 2022–23 Serie C:

- From Group A: Sangiuliano City, Piacenza;
- From Group B: San Donato Tavarnelle, Imolese, Montevarchi;
- From Group C: Gelbison, Fidelis Andria.

Viterbese, who were originally relegated from Serie C, did not apply to take part in the new season.

=== Teams promoted from Eccellenza ===
The following teams were promoted from Eccellenza:

Abruzzo

- L'Aquila

Apulia

- Manfredonia
- Città di Gallipoli^{[PO]}

Basilicata

- Rotonda

Calabria

- Gioiese

Campania

- Ischia
- San Marzano

Emilia Romagna

- Borgo San Donnino
- Victor San Marino
- Progresso^{[1]}

Friuli-Venezia Giulia

- Chions

Lazio

- Sora
- Anzio
- Boreale Donorione^{[1]}

Liguria

- Albenga
- Lavagnese^{[PO]}

Lombardy

- Cast Brescia
- Vogherese
- Tritium
- Club Milano^{[PO]}
- Caravaggio^{[1]}

Marche

- Atletico Ascoli
- Forsempronese^{[PO]}

Molise

- Campobasso

Piedmont & Aosta Valley

- RG Ticino
- Alba

Sardinia

- Latte Dolce
- Budoni^{[PO]}

Sicily

- Akragas
- Nuova Igea Virtus
- Siracusa^{[PO]}

Trentino Alto Adige – Südtirol

- Mori Santo Stefano

Tuscany

- Cenaia
- Figline
- Certaldo^{[CI]}

Umbria

- Sansepolcro

Veneto

- Treviso
- Clivense
- Bassano^{[PO]}

^{PO} Promoted as national playoff winners. ^{CI} Promoted as Coppa Italia Dilettanti semi-finalists, due to all other three semi-finalists (Cast Brescia, Campobasso and San Marzano) having been directly promoted to Serie D.

=== Relocations, mergers and renamings ===
- Vis Artena handed its participation league rights to Roma City.
- Afragolese relocated to Casalnuovo di Napoli and became Real Casalnuovo.
- Porto d'Ascoli was renamed San Benedetto Calcio and shortly thereafter acquired the naming rights of Sambenedettese.
- Cast Brescia was renamed Atletico Castegnato.
- Lupa Frascati relocated to Rome and became Romana.
- NF Ardea switched back to their previous denomination of Nuova Florida throughout the season.

=== Exclusions and withdrawals ===
On 14 July 2023, the Serie D football committee announced Viterbese and Arzachena had not submitted their league applications. In contrast, Torviscosa had renounced their right to participate in the season.

Successively, the league committee excluded Seregno and Sambenedettese due to financial issues; fellow Serie D club Porto d'Ascoli, renamed San Benedetto Calcio, successively acquired the naming rights of the latter under formal approval by the Italian Football Federation.

On 2 November 2023, after the tenth matchday of the season, Lamezia Terme (Group I) announced they were voluntarily withdrawing from the league; all their games played before their announcement were consequently declared null and void.

On 16 April 2024, Pistoiese were excluded after missing two consecutive league games due to financial issues.

== Group A ==
Pos	Team	Pld	W	D	L	GF	GA	GD	Pts	Promotion, qualification or relegation
1	Alcione (C, P)	38	23	10	5	70	27	+43	79	Promotion to Serie C (Note: If two or more teams finish tied on points in the top of the league, once the tie-breaking criteria have applied, the 1st and the 2nd-placed teams play a tie-breaker, whose winner gets promotion to Serie C.)
2	Chisola	38	21	9	8	64	37	+27	72	Qualification for promotion play-offs (Note: Winning play-offs does not grant promotion to Serie C, but a chance to get readmitted in case of vacancies.)
3	Città di Varese (Note: The club was originally deducted 1 point due to unpaid wages to former head coach Luciano De Paola. The deduction was later canceled on appeal.)	38	18	12	8	49	33	+16	66	Qualification for promotion play-offs
4	Vado (O)	38	17	14	7	51	28	+23	65	Qualification for promotion play-offs
5	RG Ticino	38	18	11	9	58	38	+20	65	Qualification for promotion play-offs
6	Bra	38	18	11	9	47	30	+17	65	
7	Ligorna	38	17	12	9	44	37	+7	63	
8	Asti	38	16	11	11	42	33	+9	59	
9	Albenga (Note: 2 points deducted due to having fielded an Under-19 player whose transfer was not formally approved yet.)	38	15	15	8	51	33	+18	58	
10	Sanremese	38	13	13	12	34	33	+1	52	
11	Fezzanese	38	14	9	15	42	50	−8	51	
12	Gozzano	38	10	15	13	35	38	−3	45	
13	Lavagnese	38	11	11	16	46	47	−1	44	
14	Vogherese	38	10	12	16	42	57	−15	42	
15	Derthona (O)	38	9	14	15	34	52	−18	41	Qualification for relegation play-outs (Note: If the 15th-placed team finishes nine or more points ahead of the 18th-placed team, then the relegation play-out is not played, and the 18th-placed team is relegated to Eccellenza directly. If the 16th-placed team finishes nine or more points ahead of the 17th-placed team, then the relegation play-out is not played, and the 17th-placed team is relegated to Eccellenza directly.)
16	Chieri (O)	38	8	15	15	39	52	−13	39	Qualification for relegation play-outs
17	Pinerolo (R)	38	8	13	17	25	44	−19	37	Qualification for relegation play-outs
18	Alba (R)	38	10	7	21	39	63	−24	37	Qualification for relegation play-outs
19	PDHAE (R)	38	5	7	26	25	63	−38	22	Relegation to Eccellenza
20	Borgosesia (R)	38	5	7	26	25	67	−42	22	Relegation to Eccellenza

Updated to match(es) played on 5 May 2024. Source:
Rules for classification: (Note: 1) Points; 2) Head-to-head points; 3) Head-to-head goal difference; 4) Goal difference; 5) Goals scored; 6) Draw.)
(C) Champions; (O) Play-off winners; (P) Promoted; (R) Relegated

== Group B ==
Pos	Team	Pld	W	D	L	GF	GA	GD	Pts	Promotion, qualification or relegation
1	Caldiero Terme (C, P)	38	23	8	7	55	32	+23	77	Promotion to Serie C (Note: If two or more teams finish tied on points in the top of the league, once the tie-breaking criteria have applied, the 1st and the 2nd-placed teams play a tie-breaker, whose winner gets promotion to Serie C.)
2	Piacenza	38	22	8	8	69	35	+34	74	Qualification for promotion play-offs (Note: Winning play-offs does not grant promotion to Serie C, but a chance to get readmitted in case of vacancies.)
3	Pro Palazzolo	38	21	10	7	49	26	+23	73	Qualification for promotion play-offs
4	Desenzano (O)	38	19	12	7	51	28	+23	69	Qualification for promotion play-offs
5	Varesina	38	20	8	10	73	49	+24	68	Qualification for promotion play-offs
6	Arconatese	38	21	5	12	58	38	+20	68	
7	Brusaporto	38	15	9	14	55	54	+1	54	
8	Villa Valle	38	15	8	15	50	44	+6	53	
9	Clivense	38	14	11	13	38	47	−9	53	
10	Casatese	38	13	12	13	53	53	0	51	
11	Folgore Caratese	38	11	18	9	44	45	−1	51	
12	Caravaggio	38	12	10	16	44	51	−7	46	
13	Club Milano	38	11	12	15	41	44	−3	45	
14	Virtus CiseranoBergamo	38	13	6	19	49	58	−9	45	
15	Real Calepina	38	11	11	16	38	47	−9	44	
16	Legnano (R)	38	11	9	18	34	50	−16	42	Qualification for relegation play-outs
17	Castellanzese (O)	38	9	12	17	36	51	−15	39	Qualification for relegation play-outs
18	Crema (R)	38	9	9	20	25	48	−23	36	Readmitted (Note: Crema was relegated to Eccellenza but was later readmitted to fill the vacancies created.)
19	Tritium (R)	38	6	11	21	27	57	−30	29	Relegation to Eccellenza
20	Ponte San Pietro (R)	38	5	9	24	31	63	−32	24	Relegation to Eccellenza

Updated to match(es) played on 5 May 2024. Source:
Rules for classification: (Note: 1) Points; 2) Head-to-head points; 3) Head-to-head goal difference; 4) Goal difference; 5) Goals scored; 6) Draw.)
(C) Champions; (O) Play-off winners; (P) Promoted; (R) Relegated

== Group C ==
Pos	Team	Pld	W	D	L	GF	GA	GD	Pts	Promotion, qualification or relegation
1	Union Clodiense Chioggia (C, P)	34	25	5	4	49	17	+32	80	Promotion to Serie C (Note: If two or more teams finish tied on points in the top of the league, once the tie-breaking criteria have applied, the 1st and the 2nd-placed teams play a tie-breaker, whose winner gets promotion to Serie C.)
2	Dolomiti Bellunesi	34	19	9	6	56	25	+31	66	Qualification for promotion play-offs (Note: Winning play-offs does not grant promotion to Serie C, but a chance to get readmitted in case of vacancies.)
3	Treviso	34	19	3	12	51	37	+14	60	Qualification for promotion play-offs
4	Bassano	34	15	9	10	35	30	+5	54	Qualification for promotion play-offs
5	Campodarsego (O)	34	12	15	7	42	26	+16	51	Qualification for promotion play-offs
6	Este	34	13	12	9	44	33	+11	51	
7	Montecchio Maggiore	34	14	9	11	48	40	+8	51	
8	Adriese	34	13	11	10	54	41	+13	50	
9	Portogruaro	34	13	9	12	52	43	+9	48	
10	Mestre	34	13	9	12	34	37	−3	48	
11	Monte Procedo	34	11	12	11	35	41	−6	45	
12	Chions	34	10	11	13	40	50	−10	41	
13	Luparense (O)	34	10	9	15	38	41	−3	39	Qualification for relegation play-outs (Note: If the 13th-placed team finishes nine or more points ahead of the 16th-placed team, then the relegation play-out is not played, and the 16th-placed team is relegated to Eccellenza directly. If the 14th-placed team finishes nine or more points ahead of the 15th-placed team, then the relegation play-out is not played, and the 15th-placed team is relegated to Eccellenza directly.)
14	Breno (O)	34	8	13	13	39	49	−10	37	Qualification for relegation play-outs
15	Cjarlins Muzane (R)	34	7	14	13	30	37	−7	35	Readmitted (Note: Cjarlins Muzane was relegated to Eccellenza after losing play-outs but was later readmitted to fill the vacancies created.)
16	Atletico Castegnato (R)	34	7	12	15	39	58	−19	33	Qualification for relegation play-outs
17	Virtus Bolzano (R)	34	4	12	18	25	52	−27	24	Relegation to Eccellenza
18	Santo Stefano (R)	34	3	6	25	22	76	−54	15	Relegation to Eccellenza

Updated to match(es) played on 5 May 2024. Source:
Rules for classification: (Note: 1) Points; 2) Head-to-head points; 3) Head-to-head goal difference; 4) Goal difference; 5) Goals scored; 6) Draw.)
(C) Champions; (O) Play-off winners; (P) Promoted; (R) Relegated

== Group D ==
Pos	Team	Pld	W	D	L	GF	GA	GD	Pts	Promotion, qualification or relegation
1	Carpi (C, P)	32	21	5	6	66	31	+35	68	Promotion to Serie C (Note: If two or more teams finish tied on points in the top of the league, once the tie-breaking criteria have applied, the 1st and the 2nd-placed teams play a tie-breaker, whose winner gets promotion to Serie C.)
2	Ravenna (O)	32	19	9	4	56	13	+43	66	Qualification for promotion play-offs (Note: Winning play-offs does not grant promotion to Serie C, but a chance to get readmitted in case of vacancies.)
3	Corticella	32	18	3	11	59	40	+19	57	Qualification for promotion play-offs
4	Victor San Marino	32	17	6	9	44	37	+7	57	Qualification for promotion play-offs
5	Lentigione	32	16	8	8	49	31	+18	56	Qualification for promotion play-offs
6	Forlì	32	16	7	9	48	35	+13	55	
7	Prato	32	12	8	12	37	41	−4	44	
8	Sangiuliano City	32	12	8	12	32	37	−5	44	
9	Fanfulla	32	11	10	11	28	35	−7	43	
10	Sant'Angelo	32	11	8	13	47	44	+3	41	
11	Aglianese	32	11	8	13	32	39	−7	41	
12	Imolese (Note: 2 points deducted due to unpaid salaries from June 2023.)	32	12	6	14	31	33	−2	40	
13	Sammaurese	32	11	4	17	37	48	−11	37	
14	Progresso	32	11	4	17	27	43	−16	37	
15	Borgo San Donnino (R)	32	5	10	17	32	58	−26	25	Relegation to Eccellenza
16	Certaldo (R)	32	6	6	20	22	55	−33	24	Relegation to Eccellenza
17	Mezzolara (R)	32	5	6	21	23	50	−27	21	Relegation to Eccellenza
18	Pistoiese (Note: Pistoiese were excluded on 17 April 2024 after missing two consecutive league games. All of their previous games were declared null and void.) (D)	0	0	0	0	0	0	0	0	Excluded from the league

Updated to match(es) played on 5 May 2024. Source:
Rules for classification: (Note: 1) Points; 2) Head-to-head points; 3) Head-to-head goal difference; 4) Goal difference; 5) Goals scored; 6) Draw.)
(C) Champions; (D) Disqualified; (O) Play-off winners; (P) Promoted; (R) Relegated

== Group E ==
Pos	Team	Pld	W	D	L	GF	GA	GD	Pts	Promotion, qualification or relegation
1	Pianese (C, P)	34	19	11	4	62	35	+27	68	Promotion to Serie C (Note: If two or more teams finish tied on points in the top of the league, once the tie-breaking criteria have applied, the 1st and the 2nd-placed teams play a tie-breaker, whose winner gets promotion to Serie C.)
2	Follonica Gavorrano	34	18	11	5	44	25	+19	65	Qualification for promotion play-offs (Note: Winning play-offs does not grant promotion to Serie C, but a chance to get readmitted in case of vacancies.)
3	Grosseto (O)	34	16	15	3	53	33	+20	63	Qualification for promotion play-offs
4	Livorno	34	16	11	7	49	32	+17	59	Qualification for promotion play-offs
5	Tau Calcio Altopascio	34	15	13	6	55	31	+24	58	Qualification for promotion play-offs
6	Seravezza Pozzi	34	17	6	11	49	40	+9	57	
7	Poggibonsi	34	15	7	12	48	42	+6	52	
8	Ghiviborgo	34	15	5	14	54	54	0	50	
9	Figline	34	12	13	9	45	43	+2	49	
10	Montevarchi	34	10	13	11	42	41	+1	43	
11	Trestina	34	11	10	13	43	45	−2	43	
12	Sangiovannese	34	10	12	12	30	37	−7	42	
13	San Donato Tavarnelle	34	11	7	16	30	33	−3	40	
14	Orvietana	34	10	8	16	33	44	−11	38	
15	Sansepolcro (R)	34	5	14	15	24	46	−22	29	Relegation to Eccellenza
16	Real Forte Querceta (R)	34	6	10	18	31	46	−15	28	Relegation to Eccellenza
17	Mobilieri Ponsacco (R)	34	2	14	18	33	60	−27	20	Relegation to Eccellenza
18	Cenaia (R)	34	3	10	21	29	67	−38	19	Relegation to Eccellenza

Updated to match(es) played on 5 May 2024. Source:
Rules for classification: (Note: 1) Points; 2) Head-to-head points; 3) Head-to-head goal difference; 4) Goal difference; 5) Goals scored; 6) Draw.)
(C) Champions; (O) Play-off winners; (P) Promoted; (R) Relegated

== Group F ==
Pos	Team	Pld	W	D	L	GF	GA	GD	Pts	Promotion, qualification or relegation
1	Campobasso (C, P)	34	20	10	4	55	29	+26	70	Promotion to Serie C (Note: If two or more teams finish tied on points in the top of the league, once the tie-breaking criteria have applied, the 1st and the 2nd-placed teams play a tie-breaker, whose winner gets promotion to Serie C.)
2	L'Aquila (O)	34	20	8	6	40	22	+18	68	Qualification for promotion play-offs (Note: Winning play-offs does not grant promotion to Serie C, but a chance to get readmitted in case of vacancies.)
3	Avezzano	34	17	8	9	50	33	+17	59	Qualification for promotion play-offs
4	Sambenedettese	34	15	13	6	58	37	+21	58	Qualification for promotion play-offs
5	Roma City	34	14	10	10	56	37	+19	52	Qualification for promotion play-offs
6	Atletico Ascoli	34	12	14	8	39	33	+6	50	
7	Vigor Senigallia	34	13	10	11	57	50	+7	49	
8	Chieti	34	12	12	10	35	34	+1	48	
9	San Nicolò Notaresco	34	11	12	11	38	39	−1	45	
10	Termoli	34	11	10	13	30	36	−6	43	
11	Sora	34	10	11	13	37	37	0	41	
12	Forsempronese	34	8	17	9	28	28	0	41	
13	Real Monterotondo Scalo	34	12	5	17	42	60	−18	41	
14	United Riccione (O)	34	10	7	17	48	51	−3	37	Qualification for relegation play-outs
15	Tivoli (R)	34	10	7	17	38	55	−17	37	Qualification for relegation play-outs
16	Fano (R)	34	6	14	14	35	49	−14	32	Relegation to Eccellenza
17	Vastogirardi (R)	34	7	8	19	26	51	−25	29	Relegation to Eccellenza
18	Matese (R)	34	6	8	20	20	51	−31	26	Relegation to Eccellenza

Updated to match(es) played on 5 May 2024. Source:
Rules for classification: (Note: 1) Points; 2) Head-to-head points; 3) Head-to-head goal difference; 4) Goal difference; 5) Goals scored; 6) Draw.)
(C) Champions; (O) Play-off winners; (P) Promoted; (R) Relegated

== Group G ==
Pos	Team	Pld	W	D	L	GF	GA	GD	Pts	Promotion, qualification or relegation
1	Cavese (C, P)	34	24	6	4	57	24	+33	78	Promotion to Serie C (Note: If two or more teams finish tied on points in the top of the league, once the tie-breaking criteria have applied, the 1st and the 2nd-placed teams play a tie-breaker, whose winner gets promotion to Serie C.)
2	Nocerina	34	17	11	6	45	27	+18	62	Qualification for promotion play-offs (Note: Winning play-offs does not grant promotion to Serie C, but a chance to get readmitted in case of vacancies.)
3	Romana (O)	34	17	10	7	50	33	+17	61	Qualification for promotion play-offs
4	Ischia	34	16	12	6	42	25	+17	60	Qualification for promotion play-offs
5	Cassino	34	16	10	8	39	22	+17	58	Qualification for promotion play-offs
6	Flaminia	34	12	14	8	42	36	+6	50	
7	Ostia Mare	34	13	8	13	53	42	+11	47	
8	Cynthialbalonga	34	12	11	11	44	37	+7	47	
9	Sarrabus Ogliastra	34	12	10	12	47	50	−3	46	
10	San Marzano	34	10	13	11	36	36	0	43	
11	Trastevere	34	10	8	16	41	50	−9	38	
12	Atletico Uri	34	10	7	17	30	48	−18	37	
13	Latte Dolce (O)	34	9	10	15	32	42	−10	37	Qualification for relegation play-outs
14	Anzio (O)	34	9	8	17	38	59	−21	35	Qualification for relegation play-outs
15	Gladiator (R)	34	8	10	16	35	46	−11	34	Qualification for relegation play-outs
16	Nuova Florida (Note: 6 points deducted due to unpaid wages and financial irregularities.) (R)	34	9	12	13	36	44	−8	33	Qualification for relegation play-outs
17	Boreale (R)	34	4	15	15	20	44	−24	27	Relegation to Eccellenza
18	Budoni (R)	34	5	11	18	27	49	−22	26	Relegation to Eccellenza

Updated to match(es) played on 5 May 2024. Source:
Rules for classification: (Note: 1) Points; 2) Head-to-head points; 3) Head-to-head goal difference; 4) Goal difference; 5) Goals scored; 6) Draw.)
(C) Champions; (O) Play-off winners; (P) Promoted; (R) Relegated

== Group H ==
Pos	Team	Pld	W	D	L	GF	GA	GD	Pts	Promotion, qualification or relegation
1	Team Altamura (C, P)	34	21	9	4	51	23	+28	72	Promotion to Serie C (Note: If two or more teams finish tied on points in the top of the league, once the tie-breaking criteria have applied, the 1st and the 2nd-placed teams play a tie-breaker, whose winner gets promotion to Serie C.)
2	Martina	34	18	12	4	51	23	+28	66	Qualification for promotion play-offs (Note: Winning play-offs does not grant promotion to Serie C, but a chance to get readmitted in case of vacancies.)
3	Nardò (O)	34	20	5	9	53	24	+29	65	Qualification for promotion play-offs
4	Fidelis Andria	34	17	10	7	58	32	+26	61	Qualification for promotion play-offs
5	Casarano	34	15	10	9	45	32	+13	55	Qualification for promotion play-offs
6	Matera	34	15	8	11	45	37	+8	53	
7	Paganese	34	12	9	13	42	43	−1	45	
8	Palmese (Note: 1 point deducted due to the team refusing to complete the Palmese vs Manfredonia league game after a temporary suspension caused by a health condition involving a local supporter.)	34	13	7	14	45	52	−7	45	
9	Gelbison	34	11	10	13	41	37	+4	43	
10	Rotonda	34	11	9	14	36	36	0	42	
11	Gravina	34	10	11	13	49	44	+5	41	
12	Manfredonia	34	9	15	10	28	38	−10	41	
13	Fasano	34	11	8	15	38	57	−19	41	
14	Angri (O)	34	10	9	15	35	52	−17	39	Qualification for relegation play-outs
15	Città di Gallipoli (R)	34	8	9	17	27	49	−22	33	Qualification for relegation play-outs
16	Barletta (R)	34	6	12	16	30	45	−15	30	Relegation to Eccellenza
17	Bitonto (R)	34	7	9	18	22	45	−23	30	Relegation to Eccellenza
18	Santa Maria Cilento (R)	34	5	10	19	22	55	−33	25	Relegation to Eccellenza

Updated to match(es) played on 5 May 2024. Source:
Rules for classification: (Note: 1) Points; 2) Head-to-head points; 3) Head-to-head goal difference; 4) Goal difference; 5) Goals scored; 6) Draw.)
(C) Champions; (O) Play-off winners; (P) Promoted; (R) Relegated

== Group I ==
Pos	Team	Pld	W	D	L	GF	GA	GD	Pts	Promotion, qualification or relegation
1	Trapani (C, P)	34	30	4	0	95	15	+80	94	Promotion to Serie C (Note: If two or more teams finish tied on points in the top of the league, once the tie-breaking criteria have applied, the 1st and the 2nd-placed teams play a tie-breaker, whose winner gets promotion to Serie C.)
2	Siracusa (Note: Siracusa were originally 3 points deducted due to incidents during a league game against Licata. The deduction was successively revoked on appeal.) (O)	34	25	6	3	79	26	+53	81	Qualification for promotion play-offs (Note: Winning play-offs does not grant promotion to Serie C, but a chance to get readmitted in case of vacancies.)
3	Vibonese	34	22	6	6	67	29	+38	72	Qualification for promotion play-offs
4	LFA Reggio Calabria	34	19	8	7	54	25	+29	65	Qualification for promotion play-offs
5	Acireale	34	15	9	10	39	41	−2	54	Qualification for promotion play-offs
6	Città di Sant'Agata	34	15	7	12	46	35	+11	52	
7	Real Casalnuovo	34	15	6	13	52	49	+3	51	
8	Ragusa	34	14	8	12	41	38	+3	50	
9	Canicattì	34	14	6	14	55	51	+4	48	
10	Nuova Igea Virtus	34	13	6	15	38	40	−2	45	
11	Licata	34	12	7	15	43	54	−11	43	
12	Akragas	34	12	6	16	42	53	−11	42	
13	Sancataldese	34	9	10	15	32	43	−11	37	
14	Portici	34	8	8	18	32	55	−23	32	
15	San Luca (Note: 1 point deducted due to financial irregularities.) (R)	34	6	12	16	37	55	−18	29	Qualification for relegation play-outs (Note: If the 16th-placed team finishes nine or more points ahead of the 19th-placed team, then the relegation play-out is not played, and the 19th-placed team is relegated to Eccellenza directly. If the 17th-placed team finishes nine or more points ahead of the 18th-placed team, then the relegation play-out is not played, and the 18th-placed team is relegated to Eccellenza directly.)
16	Locri (O)	34	7	7	20	34	68	−34	28	Qualification for relegation play-outs
17	Castrovillari (Note: 1 point deducted due to unpaid wages to former head coach Carmine Pugliese.) (R)	34	2	12	20	29	76	−47	17	Relegation to Eccellenza
18	Gioiese (R)	34	3	2	29	18	80	−62	11	Relegation to Eccellenza
19	Lamezia Terme (Note: Lamezia Terme withdrew from the league on 2 November 2023. All matches previously played by the club (five wins, one draw and four losses) were consequently declared null and void.) (D)	0	0	0	0	0	0	0	0	Withdrew from the league

Updated to match(es) played on 5 May 2024. Source:
Rules for classification: (Note: 1) Points; 2) Head-to-head points; 3) Head-to-head goal difference; 4) Goal difference; 5) Goals scored; 6) Draw.)
(C) Champions; (D) Disqualified; (O) Play-off winners; (P) Promoted; (R) Relegated

== Post-season ==
=== Relegation play-outs ===
The relegation playout games took place on 12 May 2024 and were hosted by the best-placed team in the regular season. In case of a tie after extra time, the best-placed team would escape relegation.

Team 1	Score	Team 2
Derthona	3–0	Alba
Chieri	0–0 (aet)	Pinerolo
Legnano	0–5	Castellanzese
Breno	1–1 (aet)	Cjarlins Muzane
Luparense	2–0	Atletico Castegnato
Tivoli	2–3	United Riccione
Anzio	4–0	Gladiator
Latte Dolce	3–2	Nuova Florida
Angri	2–0	Città di Gallipoli
San Luca	0–2	Locri

== Poule Scudetto ==
=== Group 1 ===
Pos	Team	Pld	W	D	L	GF	GA	GD	Pts
1	Caldiero Terme	2	2	0	0	4	1	+3	6
2	Union Clodiense Chioggia	2	1	0	1	2	3	−1	3
3	Alcione	2	0	0	2	2	4	−2	0

Source: Soccerway (in English)

Team 1	Score	Team 2
Caldiero Terme	2–0	Union Clodiense Chioggia
Union Clodiense Chioggia	2–1	Alcione
Alcione	1–2	Caldiero Terme

=== Group 2 ===
Pos	Team	Pld	W	D	L	GF	GA	GD	Pts
1	Campobasso	2	2	0	0	3	0	+3	6
2	Pianese	2	0	1	1	1	2	−1	1 (Note: Pianese finished ahead of Carpi on head-to-head goal difference: Carpi 1–1 Pianese)
3	Carpi	2	0	1	1	1	3	−2	1

Source: Soccerway (in English)
Notes:

Team 1	Score	Team 2
Pianese	0–1	Campobasso
Carpi	1–1	Pianese
Campobasso	2–0	Carpi

=== Group 3 ===
Pos	Team	Pld	W	D	L	GF	GA	GD	Pts
1	Cavese	2	2	0	0	4	2	+2	6
2	Trapani (Note: Trapani qualified for final stage as best 2nd-placed team.)	2	1	0	1	5	3	+2	3
3	Team Altamura	2	0	0	2	0	4	−4	0

Source: Soccerway (in English)
Notes:

Team 1	Score	Team 2
Cavese	1–0	Team Altamura
Team Altamura	0–3	Trapani
Trapani	2–3	Cavese

=== Final stage ===
Semi-finals
Cavese	2	3	5
Campobasso	5	2	7
Caldiero Terme	0	1	1
Trapani	1	4	5

Finals
Campobasso	5
Trapani	1
