= Cristian Mutton =

Italian footballer (born 1999)

Personal information
- Date of birth: 6 January 1999 (age 27)
- Place of birth: Como, Italy
- Height: 1.85 m (6 ft 1 in)
- Position: Forward

Team information
- Current team: Sangiuliano City

Youth career
- –2017: Como
- 2017–2018: Inter Milan
- 2018: → Bologna (loan)

Senior career*
Years	Team	Apps	(Gls)
2015–2017	Como	3	(0)
2017–2018	Inter Milan	0	(0)
2018	→ Bologna (loan)	0	(0)
2018–2020	Giana Erminio	44	(1)
2020–2021	Pro Sesto	33	(2)
2021–2023	Pontedera	63	(8)
2023	Livorno	13	(1)
2023–	Sangiuliano City	0	(0)
- * Club domestic league appearances and goals as of 20 December 2023

Cristian Mutton (born 6 January 1999) is an Italian professional footballer who plays as forward for Serie D Group D club Sangiuliano City.

== Career ==
Mutton played in Como's youth sector until January 2017. He made his first appearance in the first team on 7 December 2016, in a 1–0 win against Lupa Roma. In that month, he moved to Inter Milan where he helped the team to won the under-19s league and the Supercoppa Primavera. On 13 August 2018, he moved to Giana Erminio. Mutton made his debut for Giana Erminio on 23 September 2018, in a 2–1 loss against Imolese. Mutton made his first goal for Giana Erminio, on 5 May 2019, in a 3–3 draw against Vis Pesaro. In the 2020–21 season he moved to Pro Sesto 2013 he made 2 goals in 32 appearances. He made his debut for the team on 28 September 2020, in a 2–1 loss against Juventus U23. On 1 November, he scored his first goal for the team in a 3–0 win against Novara. On 7 June 2021, Mutton moved to Pontedera.

On 22 December 2023, Mutton joined Sangiuliano City in Serie D.
