= Sergio Pellissier =

Italian footballer (born 1979)

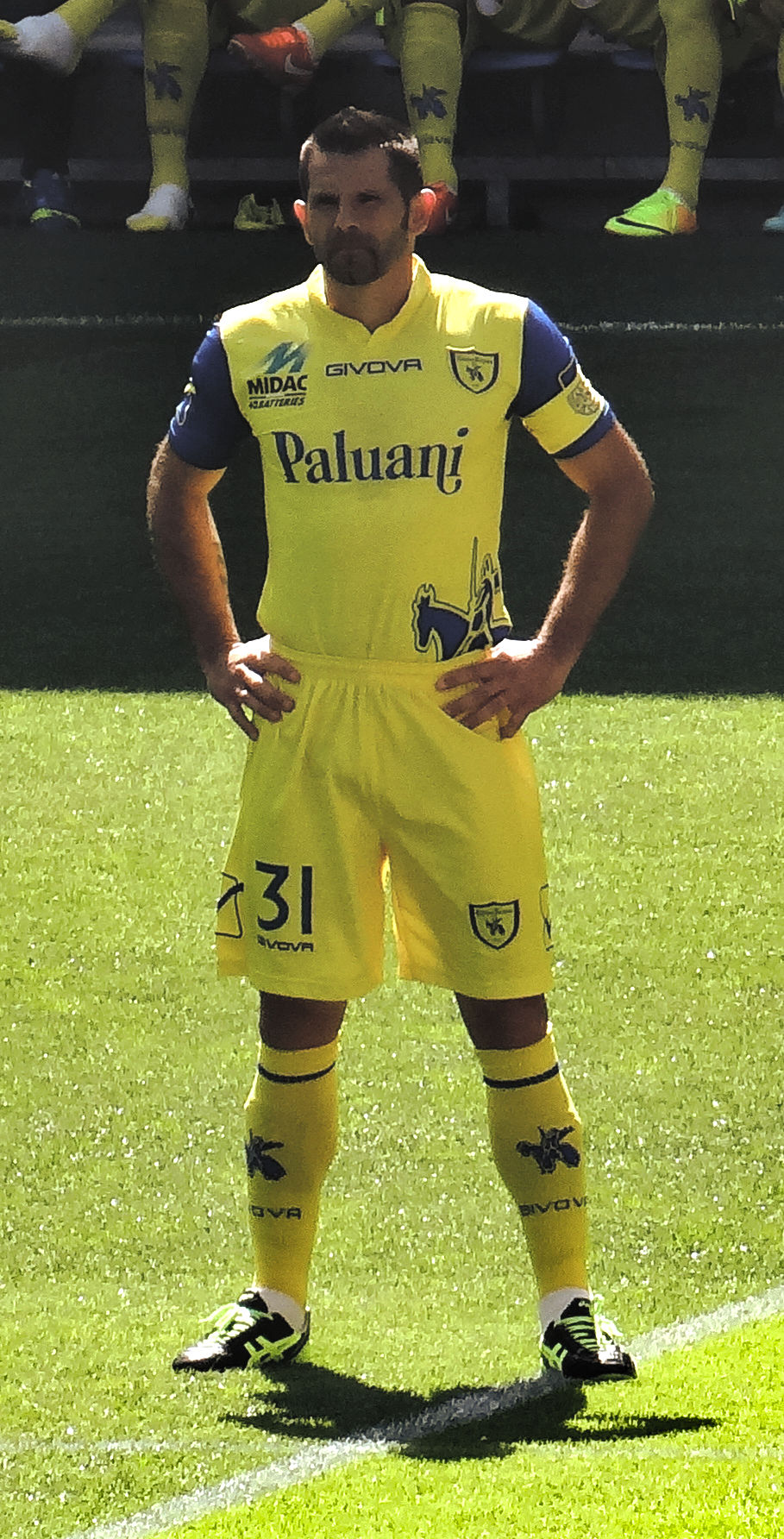
- Pellissier with ChievoVerona in 2013

Personal information
- Full name: Sergio Pellissier
- Date of birth: 12 April 1979 (age 47)
- Place of birth: Aosta, Italy
- Height: 1.75 m (5 ft 9 in)
- Position: Forward

Team information
- Current team: Chievo (chairman)

Youth career
- Fenusma
- Torino

Senior career*
Years	Team	Apps	(Gls)
1996–2000	Torino	1	(0)
1998–2000	→ Varese (loan)	53	(9)
2000–2019	Chievo	496	(134)
2001–2002	→ SPAL (loan)	44	(17)
2021–2022	Clivense	1	(2)
Total		594	(160)

International career
1997	Italy U17	5	(0)
2009	Italy	1	(1)
- * Club domestic league appearances and goals

Sergio Pellissier (French: [pɛlisje], Italian: [ˈsɛrdʒo pellisˈsje]; born 12 April 1979) is an Italian former professional footballer who played as a forward. He is currently working as owner and chairman of Chievo, after Clivense (a club he founded in 2021) was re-established as the previously defunct Chievo.

Pellissier started his club career playing for Torino's youth team, having been called up once as part of Torino's senior team. After two years at Torino, Pellissier moved to Varese in 1998, and subsequently to ChievoVerona in 2000. He was promptly loaned for two seasons to SPAL. Upon his return to Chievo in 2002, Pellissier established himself as a first team player. He helped Chievo to qualify for both the UEFA Europa League and the UEFA Champions League, and represented the team in both those competitions. He remained at the club after Chievo were relegated to Serie B at the conclusion the 2006–07 season, and became the squad's captain in the following one, helping the team to win the league title and earn promotion to Serie A. Throughout his career, Pellissier has achieved several historical records for the club, which have seen him become an idol of the Chievo fans; he is currently the club's all-time top goalscorer in official competitions, as well as being the club's record appearance holder. He retired from professional football at the end of the 2018–19 season. In 2021, he led an unsuccessful attempt to save ChievoVerona from bankruptcy.

At international level, Pellissier played five times for Italy's national under-17 youth squad in 1997, and appeared in a single match for the Italy senior team in 2009, scoring a goal.

== Club career ==
=== Early career ===
Pellissier was born in Aosta and grew up in Fénis. He started playing football in the Aosta Valley. He was 12 when he scored three goals against Torino in a tournament in Nus and Fénis for the local team Fenusma, and Torino showed interest on him. He then moved alone to Turin, but after some time he wanted to return to his home; when Pellissier was 14, he returned definitively to Torino. He made his senior debut and played one match in Serie B during the 1996–97 season against Salernitana. In 1998, Pellissier was on the team that won the under-21 tournament Torneo di Viareggio, and also appeared in a match of 1998–99 Coppa Italia. He moved on loan to the Serie C1 side Varese, where he made 53 appearances and scored nine goals between September 1998 and 2000.

=== Chievo ===
==== 2002–2011 ====
Pellissier was signed by Chievo in 2000, but was loaned to Ferrara-based club SPAL during his first year with the Verona-based side; during his one and a half seasons with SPAL, he scored 17 goals in 44 appearances. He then returned to Chievo for the 2002–03 season, making his Serie A debut on 22 September 2002, when he played for 46 minutes in a 2–1 loss against Brescia. On 3 November, Pellissier played as a 63rd-minute substitute for Luigi Beghetto and scored his first goal in Serie A, that was also the only in that match against Parma During that season, he played 25 matches in the league and scored five goals—two of which were scored in consecutive matches against Piacenza and Como. Outside the Italian League, Pellissier appeared four times in the Coppa Italia, and once in the 2002–03 UEFA Cup as a 79th-minute substitute for Massimo Marazzina in the second leg of the club's first round match against Red Star Belgrade.

The following season (2003–04), Pellissier made 27 league appearances and scored three goals, two of which were scored against Siena in a 2–1 victory, and marked his first brace. During the 2004–05 season, he scored seven times in 34 appearances. He scored twice in a 3–1 victory against Brescia. 2005–06 was Pellissier's breakout season; he made a significant contribution to Chievo's campaign, scoring 13 of Chievo's 54 league goals. Among them, Pellissier scored in four consecutive matches and twice in the matches against Lecce and Reggina. The season was an important one; the 2006 Italian football scandal ensured that Chievo finished in fourth place because of various points deductions to other sides, qualifying Chievo for the 2006–07 UEFA Champions League.

In the Champions League, Chievo were eliminated by Levski Sofia after losing the first match 2–0 and drawing the second one 2–2; Pellissier played in these matches and did not score in either. Chievo were also knocked out of the UEFA Cup by Braga in two matches, in which Pellissier was not on the team's lineup. The 2006–07 season was a successful one for Pellissier from a personal standpoint; he was voted Chievo's best player by the club's supporters, winning the "Cangrande del Bentegodi". He scored nine league goals in 36 appearances; but, on the final day, Chievo were relegated to Serie B for the first time. Pellissier chose to stay with Chievo despite their relegation and was made the team's captain in the 2007–08 season. He was a key player for the club and played a pivotal role in Chievo's Serie B title victory and return to Serie A, scoring a career best 22 goals for the 2007–08 season, and winning the Cangrande award once again. His tally of 22 goals surpassed Raffaele Cerbone's club record of 20 goals in a single season for Chievo.

In 2008–09, Pellissier played all of Chievo's 38 Serie A matches and scored 13 goals, including two on 15 March 2009 in a 3–0 victory over Lazio at the Stadio Olimpico. Three weeks later, on 5 April, he scored the first hat-trick of his career in a 3–3 draw against Juventus in Turin; this was followed on 19 April by a brace in a match against Siena. Pellissier's 2008–09 performance won him the Cangrande award for the third consecutive season. He played 35 matches and scored 11 goals in the following season (2009–10), with consecutive scores in the third and fourth round, in the 21st and 22nd, and in the 34th and 35th. In 2010–11, Pellissier made the same numbers of appearances and scored the same number of goals as in the previous season. He scored two braces in the season—the first in a 3–1 win against Napoli and the other in a 3–0 win against Brescia. He made his 300th appearance for Chievo on 6 February 2011 in a 2–1 loss against Lazio.

==== 2011–2019 ====
In a 2–1 victory against Novara on 2 February 2012, Pellissier scored his 100th goal for Chievo. On 18 February, he was accused of being involved on the 2011–12 Italian football scandal, which affected his performance. Nevertheless, he also scored in consecutive matches against Fiorentina and Catania, and a brace in a 4–4 draw against Palermo. He scored eight league goals in 35 appearances in the 2011–12 season, when he won his fourth Cangrande award. On 26 August 2012, in his 300th Serie A match for the gialloblù, he scored his first goal of five in his 24 appearances of the Serie A 2012–13 season. He also scored a goal on his sole match in Coppa Italia on 18 August 2012 during a 4–0 win over Ascoli.

In July 2013, Pellissier renewed his contract with Chievo for two years. Starting the 2013–14 campaign as a first-team man, he eventually became a substitute under the coach Eugenio Corini. He made 22 appearances in the season and scored his only goal in a 2–1 victory over Udinese on 21 September 2013. On 22 August 2014, in a 1–0 defeat by Pescara during the Coppa Italia, Pellissier reached 400 appearances for Chievo. During the 2014–15 season, he played 27 matches and score seven goals in Serie A; among them, on 9 November 2014, Pellissier came on as a 46th-minute substitute and scored two goals in a 2–1 victory against Cesena after more than a year since his last goal.

Before the start of the 2015–16 season, Pellissier, at the age of 36, was "surprised" to get a three-year contract extension until June 2018. When he signed the contract, he was expecting "to repay in full", seeking to reach the mark of 100 goals in Serie A. He had score 93 goals so far, and he was not able to reach the mark, scoring five goals in 19 appearances. During the season, he would "take the scene", as reported by Mediaset, scoring a brace in a 5–1 win against Frosinone. In the following season, he would reach his 400th Serie A match on 6 November 2016 during a 2–1 defeat to Juventus, when he also scored his 99th goal. His 100th Serie A goal, all of which came with Chievo, would be scored on 11 December 2016 in a 2–0 away win over Palermo. He also scored in consecutive Serie A matches twice—in the 16th and 17th round, and in the 19th and 20th round. In 2017–18, he played 20 matches and scored two goals, both goals were scored against Hellas Verona; the first, on 22 October 2017, in a Serie A 3–2 victory, and the other on 29 November in a Coppa Italia 1–1 draw, when he also missed a decisive penalty shot.

On 10 May 2019, almost a month after his 40th birthday, Pellissier announced that he would be retiring from professional football at the end of the 2018–19 season; Chievo subsequently announced that they would also be retiring the number 31 shirt that he wore for the club in his honour. On 19 May, he made his final home appearance for the club in a 0–0 draw against Sampdoria; in the 72nd minute, he came off for Manuel Pucciarelli, and was given a standing ovation by the fans and a guard of honour by his teammates, who saluted him. He made the final appearance of his career on 25 May, in a 0–0 away draw against Frosinone. In total, he made 517 appearances for Chievo in all competitions, scoring 139 goals. Chievo finished the 2018–19 Serie A season in last place and were relegated to Serie B.

== International career ==
Pellissier made five appearances for the Italy national under-17 football team between April and May 1997; he scored no goals for the Italian under-17 side. In May 2009, Pellissier received his first call up to the Italian senior national team by coach Marcello Lippi to play in a friendly against Northern Ireland. In the match, on 6 June, he entered as a substitute for Giampaolo Pazzini in the 62nd minute and scored a goal 11 minutes later in the 3–0 win. Regarding his debut with the national squad, he stated: "It's a dream that came true. L'azzurra is the cherry on the cake of an extraordinary season. However the merit is not mine, but all Chievo's." This was Pellissier's only senior appearance for Italy.

== Style of play ==
A versatile forward, Pellissier is capable of playing anywhere along the front line, although he usually plays in a free role as a second striker, a position in which he prefers to play alongside a larger, and more physically gifted centre-forward, due to his ability to link-up with other players and create chances for his teammates. He is also able to be deployed as an out-and-out striker, or as a right winger, due to his tendency to drift out wide, and then cut into the centre to strike on goal with his stronger left foot. Due to his elevation and heading accuracy, he excels in the air; he is also known for his speed, both on and off the ball, as well as his agility. Possessing a keen eye for goal, Pellissier is also an accurate striker of the ball from both inside and outside the penalty area, and has drawn praise in the media over his defensive work-rate and movement off the ball, as well as his ability to make late runs into the box and either get onto the end of passes or create space for his teammates. He has also stood out for his longevity, leadership, and loyalty throughout his career.

== Post-playing career ==
Following his retirement, Pellissier stayed at Chievo as the club's new technical area coordinator, being assisted by Giorgio De Giorgis for transfer market-related duties. He left Chievo by the end of the 2020–21 season due to disagreements with the board. He successively accepted to join Rovigo as the club's new general director, a role he kept for a very brief amount of time due to regulations preventing from being contracted for two separate league clubs.

Later in the summer of 2021, ChievoVerona were expelled from Serie B as a result of financial irregularities relating to missing tax payments. This meant that the club was essentially bankrupt and needed new owners to restart in Serie D. Pellissier led the search for a new ownership group, but was unsuccessful. On 21 August 2021, Pellissier announced that ChievoVerona would cease to exist in an Instagram post, calling it "one of the saddest days of my life." He then decided to found a new club himself, named Chievo 2021, which was admitted to the Terza Categoria for the 2021–22 season. The club was then renamed to Clivense following a legal warning from Chievo's chairman and owner Luca Campedelli. The club won promotion to the Seconda Categoria on their debut season, with a 43-year old Pellissier playing in the final league game and scoring two goals in a 5–0 win, and successively entered the Eccellenza after having acquired the sporting rights of San Martino Speme.

== Personal life ==
In 2001, during the time Pellissier was playing for SPAL in Ferrara, he met Gian Micaela Viadana in a restaurant in which she was working. After some time exchanging e-mails with Micaela, they started a relationship. They married on 19 June 2004, and the couple have two children together, a son, Matteo, and a daughter, Sofia.

== Career statistics ==
=== Club ===
Appearances and goals by club, season and competition
Club	Season	League			Coppa Italia		Europe		Total	
Club	Season	Division	Apps	Goals	Apps	Goals	Apps	Goals	Apps	Goals
Torino	1996–97	Serie B	1	0	0	0	—		1	0
Torino	1997–98	Serie B	0	0	0	0	—		0	0
Torino	1998–99	Serie B	0	0	1	0	—		1	0
Torino	Total		1	0	1	0	—		2	0
Varese (loan)	1998–99	Serie C1	27	4	0	0	—		27	4
Varese (loan)	1999–2000	Serie C1	26	5	0	0	—		26	5
Varese (loan)	Total		53	9	0	0	0	0	53	9
Chievo	2000–01	Serie B	0	0	0	0	—		0	0
Chievo	2002–03	Serie A	25	5	4	0	1 (Note: Appearance(s) in UEFA Cup)	0	30	5
Chievo	2003–04	Serie A	27	3	1	0	—		28	3
Chievo	2004–05	Serie A	34	7	0	0	—		34	7
Chievo	2005–06	Serie A	34	13	2	0	—		36	13
Chievo	2006–07	Serie A	36	9	0	0	2 (Note: Appearance(s) in UEFA Champions League)	0	38	9
Chievo	2007–08	Serie B	38	22	1	0	—		39	22
Chievo	2008–09	Serie A	38	13	1	1	—		39	14
Chievo	2009–10	Serie A	35	11	1	1	—		36	12
Chievo	2010–11	Serie A	35	11	0	0	—		35	11
Chievo	2011–12	Serie A	35	8	1	0	—		36	8
Chievo	2012–13	Serie A	24	5	1	1	—		25	6
Chievo	2013–14	Serie A	22	1	1	0	—		23	1
Chievo	2014–15	Serie A	27	7	1	0	—		28	7
Chievo	2015–16	Serie A	19	5	1	0	—		20	5
Chievo	2016–17	Serie A	30	9	1	1	—		31	10
Chievo	2017–18	Serie A	19	1	1	1	—		20	2
Chievo	2018–19	Serie A	19	4	0	0	—		19	4
Chievo	Total		496	134	18	5	3	0	517	139
SPAL (loan)	2001	Serie C1	14	3	—		—		14	3
SPAL (loan)	2001–02	Serie C1	30	14	0	0	—		30	14
SPAL (loan)	Total		44	17	0	0	0	0	44	17
Career total			594	160	19	5	3	0	616	165

=== International ===
Appearances and goals by national team and year
National team	Year	Apps	Goals
Italy	2009	1	1

Scores and results list Italy's goal tally first

No.	Date	Venue	Opponent	Score	Result	Competition
1	6 June 2009	Arena Garibaldi, Pisa, Italy	Northern Ireland	3–0	3–0	Friendly

== Honours ==
Chievo

- Serie B: 2007–08
