= Pinerolo FC =

Italian football club

Pinerolo
- Full name: Pinerolo Football Club
- Founded: 1918
- Ground: Luigi Barbieri, Pinerolo, Italy
- Capacity: 2,000
- Chairman: Leonardo Fortunato
- Manager: Fabio Nisticò
- League: Eccellenza
- 2023–24: Serie D/A, 17th (relegated after play-off)
Home colours	Away colours

Pinerolo Football Club (or simply Pinerolo) is an Italian football club, based in Pinerolo, Piedmont. The team currently plays in Eccellenza.

== History ==
Pinerolo is one of the first football teams in Italy, dating back to before the First World War, but it was only in 1918 that it was officially born as Pinerolo Football Club. The team makes its entrance in football upgraded in 1931 when it won its first championship of Seconda Divisione (the third level of the football pyramid era) and achieves promotion to the Prima Divisione.

Pinerolo remained in the league until 1935 when Prima Divisione is regionally reformed: only one season remained at this level as it got promotion to Serie C in 1936: here Pinerolo remained for five seasons. In 1941 did not submit to play in Serie C, but after the Second World War it was admitted to the league which was greatly enlarged compared to previous seasons.

In 1948 relegated to Promozione and the following year in Prima Divisione: it had to wait until 1956 to get promotion to IV Serie. But in 1956 Pinerolo suffered a new relegation and played again in Prima Divisione where it remained for four seasons before getting promotion in Serie D.

In 1966 relegated again in the Pima Divisione and waited until 1979 to play back in Serie D: it remains at this level until 1998 (except for the 1991-1992 season). The following years, the team played in Eccellenza and Promozione (except for the 2002-2003 season). In 2014-15 season Pinerolo won the Group B of Eccellenza Piedmont and won promotion to Serie D.

In 2015-16 season Pinerolo finished 7th in Girone A of Serie D.

== Colors and badge ==
The colors of the team are blue and white.
