= Pietro Cogliati =

Italian professional football player

Personal information
- Full name: Pietro Maria Cogliati
- Date of birth: 18 June 1992 (age 34)
- Place of birth: Milan, Italy
- Height: 1.73 m (5 ft 8 in)
- Position: Forward

Team information
- Current team: Varese

Youth career
- 2009–2012: AC Milan

Senior career*
Years	Team	Apps	(Gls)
2012–2013	Tritium	23	(3)
2013–2014	FeralpiSalò	7	(0)
2014	Pergolettese	11	(1)
2014–2015	Pavia	24	(3)
2015–2016	Giana Erminio	23	(3)
2016–2017	Vibonese	21	(1)
2017–2018	Monza	31	(2)
2018–2019	Campobasso	34	(7)
2019–2021	Campobasso	50	(24)
2021–2024	Sangiuliano City	117	(31)
2025	Pro Palazzolo	21	(0)
2025–	Varese	32	(5)
- * Club domestic league appearances and goals as of 25 June 2026

Pietro Cogliati (born 18 June 1992) is an Italian professional footballer who plays as a forward for Serie D Group A club Varese.

== Career ==
=== Campobasso ===
On 4 October 2019, Cogliati joined Serie D club S.S.D. Città di Campobasso. He left the club at the end of the season, where his contract expired. However, he returned to the club and signed a new deal at the end of October 2019.
