= FC Sangiuliano City =

Italian football club

- Full name: Football Club Sangiuliano City SRL
- Nicknames: Gialloverdi (the green and yellows), Sangiu
- Founded: 2021
- Dissolved: 2026
- Ground: Stadio Breda, Sesto San Giovanni, Italy
- Capacity: 3,523
- Chairman: Andrea Luce
- League: Serie D Group D
- 2023–24: Serie D Group D, 8th of 18
Home colours	Away colours	Third colours

Football Club Sangiuliano City, commonly known as Sangiuliano City or simply Sangiuliano, was an Italian association football club from San Giuliano Milanese, Lombardy, disbanded in 2026.

== History ==
The club was founded in 2021 after the Luce family, previously owning amateur club Città di Sangiuliano (founded in 1968 as Società Sportiva Borgolombardo), which they led from Seconda Categoria to Eccellenza, acquired Serie D club NibionnOggiono and relocated it to San Giuliano Milanese under the new denomination of Sangiuliano City Nova; for their debut season, due to Italian Football Federation regulations involving relocated clubs, they had to play their home games in Nova Milanese.

In their debut season in the Serie D, Sangiuliano City, captained by 40-year old Manuel Pascali, immediately won promotion to Serie C.

Logo 2021-2022

== A former squad ==
As of 22 December 2023

Note: Flags indicate national team as defined under FIFA eligibility rules; some limited exceptions apply. Players may hold more than one non-FIFA nationality.

No.	Pos.	Nation	Player
—	GK	ITA	Claude Barotac
—	GK	ITA	Filippo Manfrin
—	DF	ITA	Simone Annoni
—	DF	ROU	Andrei Anton
—	DF	ITA	Matteo Bruzzone
—	DF	ITA	Marco Carminati
—	DF	ITA	Simone Di Fini
—	DF	ITA	Alessio Girgi
—	DF	ITA	Marco Mereghetti
—	DF	ITA	Matthias Solerio
—	DF	ITA	Pietro Vassallo
—	MF	ITA	Jacopo Atzeni

No.	Pos.	Nation	Player
—	MF	CRO	Mihael Briški
—	MF	ITA	Sergio Guerrini
—	MF	ITA	Matteo Milan (on loan from Inter Milan)
—	MF	ITA	Luca Palesi
—	MF	ITA	Aniello Salzano
—	MF	ITA	Christian Sighinolfi
—	FW	BEL	Loris Brogno
—	FW	ITA	Pietro Cogliati
—	FW	ITA	Gabriele Deiana
—	FW	TUN	Nabil Makni
—	FW	ITA	Cristian Mutton
—	FW	ALB	Frenci Qeros

=== Out on loan ===
Note: Flags indicate national team as defined under FIFA eligibility rules; some limited exceptions apply. Players may hold more than one non-FIFA nationality.

No. / Pos. / Nation / Player; — / DF / ITA / Nicolas Naso (at Chisola until 30 June 2024)	No. / Pos. / Nation / Player; — / DF / ITA / Paolo Furlani (at Pavia until 30 June 2024)

== Honours ==
- Serie D

Winners: 2021–22 (Group B),
