= AC ChievoVerona =

Italian football club

ChievoVerona
- Full name: Associazione Calcio ChievoVerona
- Nicknames: I Mussi Volanti ("The Flying Donkeys" in Venetian); Céo ("Chievo" in Venetian); Squadra della Diga (Dam Team); Clivensi
- Founded: 6 September 1929; 97 years ago 1948; 78 years ago (refounded); 10 May 2024; 2 years ago (refounded)
- Stadium: Stadio Aldo Olivieri, Verona
- Capacity: 2,900
- Owner: Sergio Pellissier
- President: Sergio Pellissier
- Head coach: Marco Didu
- League: Serie D Group B
- 2025–26: Serie D Group B, 3rd of 18
- Website: chievoverona1929.it
Home colours	Away colours	Third colours

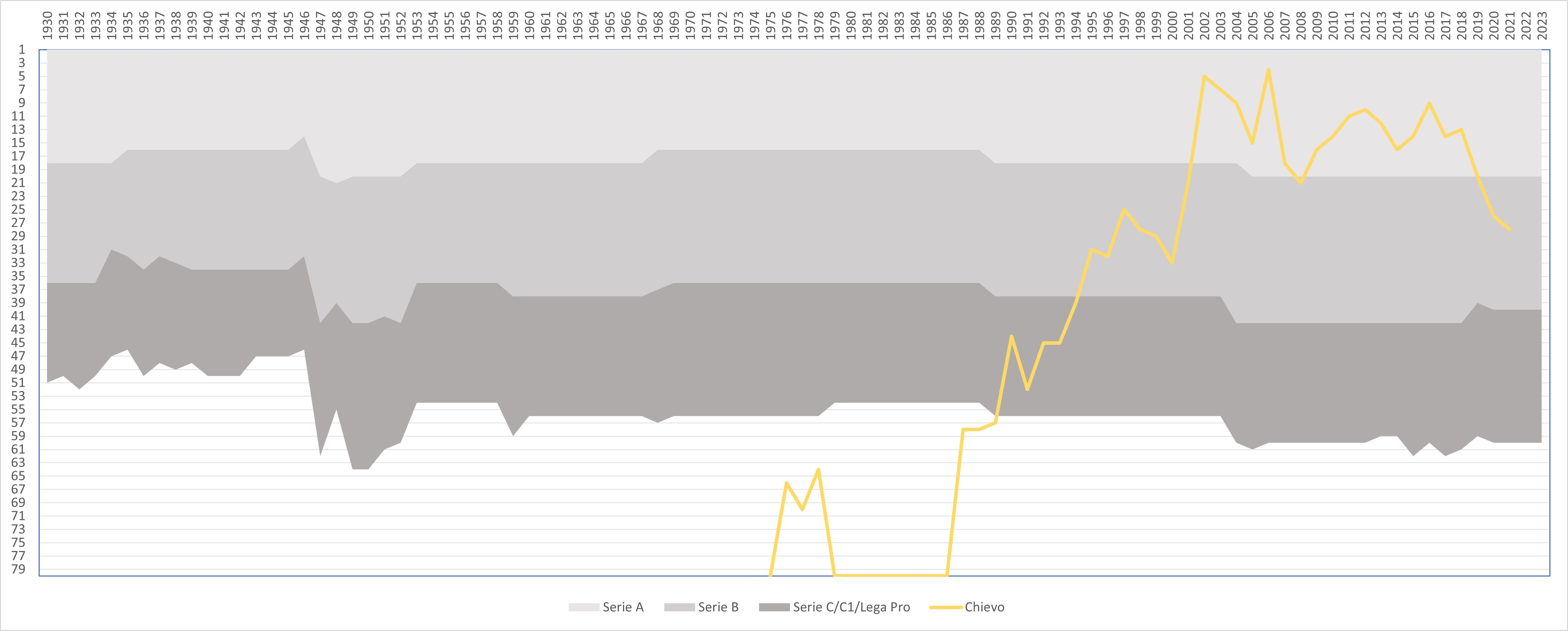
The progress of Chievo in the Italian football league structure since the first season of a unified Serie A (1929/30). Only seasons in the top four tiers appear in the graph.

Associazione Calcio ChievoVerona, commonly referred to as ChievoVerona or simply Chievo (Italian pronunciation: [ˈkjɛːvo], locally [ˈkjeːvo]), is an Italian football club named after and representing Chievo, a suburb of 4,500 inhabitants in Verona, Veneto. The club has been under the ownership of the team's former captain Sergio Pellissier since 2024, representing a group of almost 800 stakeholders created through a crowdfunding program, a first of its kind in Italian football. The team plays in the Serie D, the fourth level of Italian football.

The club was founded in 1929 and refounded two times during its history in 1948 and 2024. It is the only football team coming from the lowest level of Italian football succeeding in climbing the whole amateur and professional pyramid until reaching Serie A for the first time in 2001–02 and European competitions the year after. It currently plays at the Stadio Aldo Olivieri.

During its years as a professional club, Chievo shared the 38,402-seat Stadio Marcantonio Bentegodi stadium with its cross-town rivals Hellas Verona.

== History ==
=== Early years ===
The team was founded in 1929 by a small number of football fans from Chievo, a Verona frazione. Initially, the club was not officially affiliated to the Italian Football Federation (FIGC), but nonetheless played several amateur tournaments and friendly matches under the denomination Opera Nazionale Dopolavoro Chievo, a title imposed by the fascist regime. The club's formal debut in an official league was on 8 November 1931. The team colours at the time were blue and white. Chievo disbanded in 1936, however, due to economic woes but returned to play in 1948 after World War II, being registered in the regional league of Seconda Divisione (Second Division). In 1957, the team moved to the field "Carlantonio Bottagisio", where they played until 1986. In 1959, after the restructuring of the football leagues, Chievo was admitted to play the Seconda Categoria (Second Category), a regional league placed next-to-last in the Italian football pyramid. That year, Chievo changed its name to Cardi Chievo after a new sponsor and was quickly promoted to the Prima Categoria, from which it experienced its first-ever relegation in 1962.

=== Series of promotions ===
In 1964, Luigi Campedelli, a businessman and owner of the Paluani company, was named the new Chievo chairman. Under Campedelli's presidency, Chievo climbed through the Italian football pyramid, reaching the Serie D after the 1974–75 season. Under the name Paluani Chievo the team was promoted to Serie C2 in 1986. Due to promotion, Chievo was forced to move to the Stadio Marcantonio Bentegodi, the main venue in Verona; another promotion to Serie C1 followed in 1989. In 1990, the team changed its name to its current one, A.C. ChievoVerona.

In 1992, President Luigi Campedelli, who had returned at the helm of the club two years before, died of a heart attack, and his son Luca Campedelli, aged just 23, became the new and youngest chairman of an Italian professional football club. Campedelli promoted Giovanni Sartori to director of football and named Alberto Malesani as the new head coach. Under Malesani, the team astonishingly won the Serie C1 and was promoted to Serie B, where city rival Hellas Verona was playing at the time. In 1997, after Malesani signed for Fiorentina, Silvio Baldini was appointed the new head coach. The following season, with Domenico Caso as the coach, saw the first dismissal of a coach during the presidency of Luca Campedelli, with Caso being fired and replaced with Lorenzo Balestro. It was during these years that the nickname "mussi volanti" ("flying donkeys") was born. It originated from supporters of their crosstown rivals Hellas, who would mock long-suffering Chievo supporters that Chievo will only be promoted if "donkeys could fly" (the equivalent of the English language falsism "if pigs could fly," denoting an impossible dream).

In 2000–01, Luigi Delneri was signed as coach and led Chievo, by virtue of its third-place finish in Serie B, to promotion to Serie A, the first time in team history that it had reached the top tier of Italian football.

=== Mussi Volanti (2001–2007) ===
In 2001–02, Chievo's Serie A debut season, the team was most critics' choice for an instant return to Serie B. However, they became the surprise team in the league, often playing spectacular and entertaining football and even leading the league for six consecutive weeks. The club finally ended the season with a highly respectable fifth-place finish, qualifying the team to play in the UEFA Cup. Chievo's impressive performance inspired a 2002 book about soccer economics titled "Fenomeno Chievo. Economia, costume, società" by Marco Vitale.

In 2002–03, Chievo debuted at the European level but were eliminated in the first round by Red Star Belgrade. The team finished the Serie A season in seventh place, again proving itself one of the better Serie A teams. The 2003–04 season, the last with Delneri at the helm, saw Chievo finish ninth.

The 2004–05 season is remembered as one of the toughest ever in Chievo's history. Mario Beretta, a Serie A novice from Ternana, was named coach, but after a strong start that brought Chievo to third behind Juventus and Milan, the team slowly lost position in the league table. With three matches remaining in the season, Chievo was third-from-last, a position which would see it relegated to Serie B. As a last resort, Beretta was fired, and Maurizio D'Angelo, a former Chievo player, was appointed temporarily to replace him as coach. Morale improved, and two wins and a draw from the final three matches proved enough to keep Chievo in Serie A.

In 2005–06, Giuseppe Pillon of Treviso FBC was appointed as new coach. The team experienced a return to the successful Delneri era, both in style of play and results, which resulted in Chievo ending the season in seventh and gaining a berth in the UEFA Cup. However, because of the football scandal involving several top-class teams, all of which finished higher than Chievo in the 2005–06 season, the Flying Donkeys were awarded a place in the next Champions League preliminary phase.

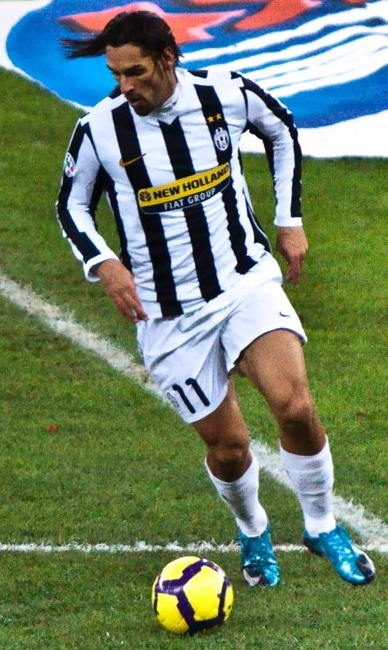
Amauri played for Chievo between 2003 and 2006

On 14 July 2006, the verdict in the scandal was made public. Juventus, Milan and Fiorentina, who had all initially qualified for the 2006–07 Champions League, and Lazio, who had initially qualified for the 2006–07 UEFA Cup, were all banned from UEFA competition for the 2006–07 season. However, Milan were allowed to enter the Champions League after their appeal to the FIGC. Chievo took up a place in the third qualifying stage of the competition along with Milan and faced Bulgarian side Levski Sofia. Chievo lost the first leg 2–0 in Sofia and managed a 2–2 home draw on the second leg and were eliminated by a 4–2 aggregate score, with Levski advancing to the Champions League group stage. As a Champions League third round qualifying loser, Chievo was given a place in the UEFA Cup final qualifying round. On 25 August 2006, they were drawn to face Portuguese side Braga. The first leg, played on 14 September in Braga, ended in a 2–0 win for the Portuguese. The return match, played on 28 September in Verona, although won by Chievo 2–1, resulted in a 3–2 aggregate loss and the club's elimination from the competition.

On 16 October 2006, following a 1–0 defeat against Torino, head coach Giuseppe Pillon was fired and replaced by Luigi Delneri, one of the original symbols of the miracle Chievo, who had led the club to the Serie A in 2002.

On 27 May 2007, the last match day of the 2006–07 Serie A season, Chievo was one of five teams in danger of falling into the last undecided relegation spot. Needing only a draw against Catania, a direct competitor in the relegation battle, Chievo lost 2–0 playing on a neutral field in Bologna. Wins by Parma, Siena and Reggina condemned Chievo to Serie B for the 2007–08 season after six seasons in the topflight.

=== A year with the Cadetti (2007–08) ===
Chievo bounced back quickly from the disappointment of their relegation on the last matchday of 2006–07, searching for an immediate promotion return to the topflight. After the expected departure of several top-quality players, including Franco Semioli, Salvatore Lanna, Matteo Brighi, Paolo Sammarco and Erjon Bogdani, the manager Delneri also parted ways with the club. Giuseppe Iachini replaced him and the captain, Lorenzo D'Anna, gave way to Sergio Pellissier at the end of the transfer window. A new squad was constructed, most notably including the arrivals of midfielders Maurizio Ciaramitaro and Simone Bentivoglio, defender César and forward Antimo Iunco. This new incarnation of the gialloblu were crowned winter champions (along with Bologna), en route to a 41st matchday promotion after a 1–1 draw at Grosseto left them four points clear of third-place Lecce with one match remaining. In addition to winning promotion, they were conferred with the Ali della Vittoria trophy on the final matchday of the season, their first league title of any kind in 14 years.

=== Return in Serie A (2008–2019) ===
In their first season return to the topflight, Chievo immediately struggled in the league, resulting in the dismissal of Iachini in November and his replacement with former Parma boss Domenico Di Carlo. After Di Carlo's appointment, Chievo managed a remarkable resurgence that led the gialloblu out of the relegation zone after having collected just nine points from their first 17 matches. Highlight matches included a 3–0 defeat of Lazio (who then won the 2008–09 Coppa Italia title) at the Stadio Olimpico, and a thrilling 3–3 draw away to Juventus in which captain and longtime Chievo striker Sergio Pellissier scored a late equalizer to complete his first career hat-trick. A series of hard-fought draws against top clubs Roma, Internazionale and Genoa in the final stretch of the season solidified Ceo's position outside the drop zone and Serie A status was finally confirmed on matchday 37 with a home draw against Bologna. An essentially unchanged line-up earned safety the following season with four matchdays to spare.

Lorenzo D'Anna remained as coach of the club for the 2018–19 season after replacing Rolando Maran during the 2017–18 season. On 13 September, Chievo were deducted 3 points after being found guilty of false accounting on exchanging players with Cesena. President Luca Campedelli was banned for three months as a result of the scheme. Chievo were officially relegated on 14 April 2019 after a 3–1 home loss to Napoli.

=== Serie B years and league exclusion (2019–2021) ===
In July 2021, Chievo was expelled from Serie B for the 2021–22 season for being unable to prove its financial viability due to outstanding tax payments. The club argued that there was an agreement in place during the COVID-19 pandemic that allowed them to spread the payments out over a longer period. However, after three unsuccessful appeals, the decision to bar Chievo Verona from registering to Serie B was upheld, with Cosenza taking their place in Serie B.

=== Clivense and Serie D restart (2021–current) ===
Over the next months following the club's exclusion, former captain Sergio Pellissier led the search for a new ownership group to allow a phoenix club to compete in Serie D under the Chievo name. However, on 21 August, Pellissier announced in an Instagram post that no owners were found in time for the Serie D registration deadline. The original Chievo club has in the meantime appealed to the Council of State against its exclusion and is currently registered in no division, albeit still with the right to apply for a spot in an amateur league of Veneto in the following weeks. Campedelli eventually opted to keep the club alive as a youth team for the 2021–22 season, while Pellissier decided instead to found a new club himself, which was admitted to Terza Categoria at the very bottom of the Italian football league system; the club, originally named FC Chievo 2021, was then renamed to FC Clivense following a legal warning from AC ChievoVerona.

On 10 May 2024, Sergio Pellissier and the owners of Clivense, by then in the Serie D league, successfully acquired the logo and naming rights of the original ChievoVerona club in an auction. Later on 29 May, Clivense formally changed its denomination to AC ChievoVerona, thus becoming the legal heir to the original club, albeit maintaining white and blue as its colours. In the 2025–26 Serie D season, Chievo won the promotion play-offs, but were not admitted into Serie C and remained in the fourth tier.

== Identity ==
=== Crest ===
The official crest of the club depicts since 1998 Cangrande della Scala, ruler of Verona during medieval times, the shape of it taking inspiration from a historical statue located in the old town. The logo, coloured in yellow and blue, shows the full name of the club and the year of foundation. It was confirmed as Chievo's logo after a survey among the club's stakeholder in June 2024.

Being founded by amateur football lovers in 1929 as an after-work sport club, at that time encouraged by the fascist regime, the first crest of Chievo included a fasces. Since 1959, after adopting yellow-blue colours, the club used the shape of a Swiss shield with different official denominations during the years, including some private company names sponsoring the club. During the 1980s, president Luigi Campedelli, a businessman owning the cake company Paluani, used the commercial logo of the company as official crest, showing often the full name on the official football shirt.

Since the 1990s, after reaching professional leagues and after changing the official name into A.C. ChievoVerona, the crest included for the first time the shape of Cangrande della Scala and boasted a letter V, symbolizing the pride of representing the whole city. In 2001, the logo took its current form including Fraktur font and the foundation year, until its last modernization in 2021.

In the period 2001–2021, an alternative logo, representing a white ladder on a burgundy background, was in use both on shirts and club's activities, inspired by the historical logo of the Province of Verona and already used by the club in the 1930s after winning the province champion's title in the local leagues.

This is a gallery of the evolution of Chievo's crest since its foundation:

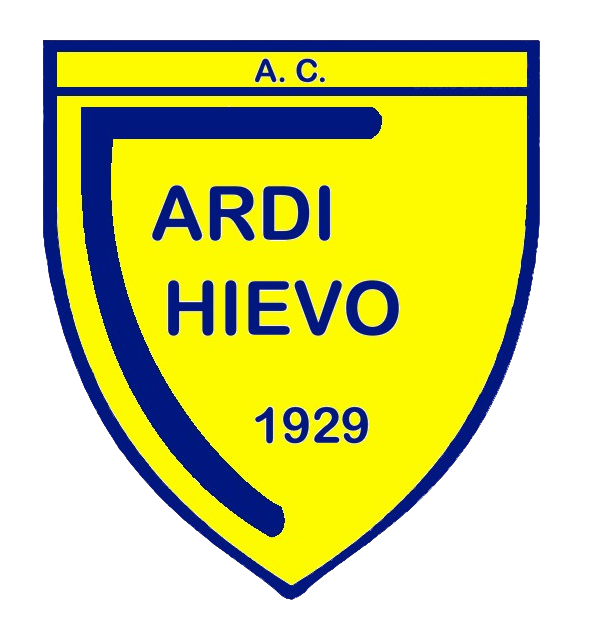
Cardi Chievo (1959–1975)

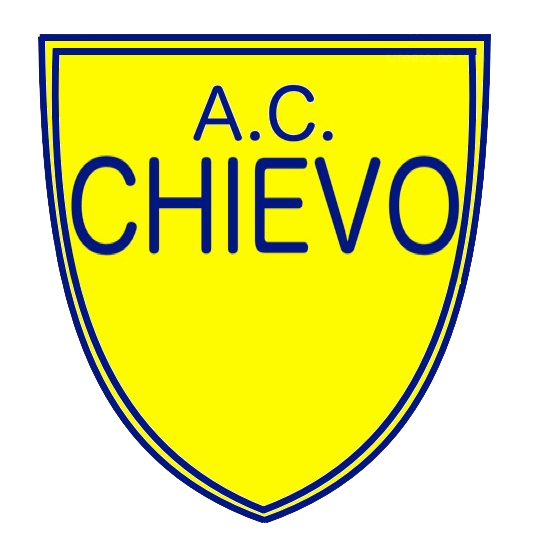
A.C. Chievo (1975–1981)

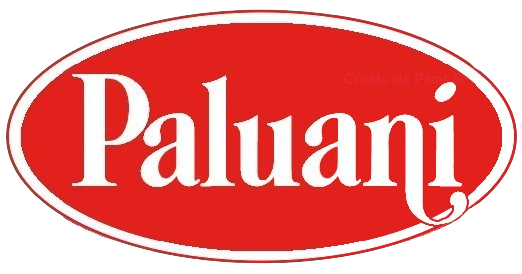
Paluani Chievo (1981–1986)

A.C. ChievoVerona (2001–2021, 2024–present)

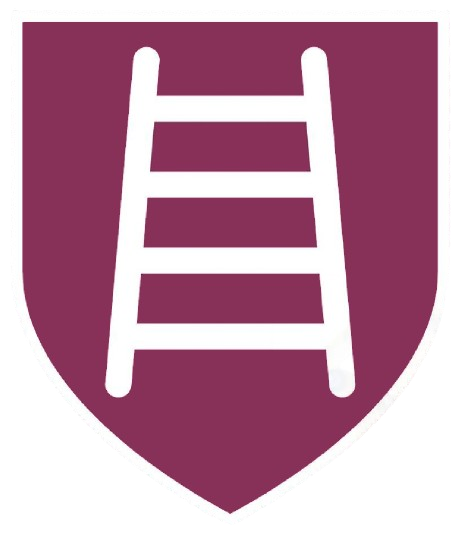
Alternative logo, used in away kits (2001–2021)

=== Colours ===
Chievo has worn two different colours patterns during its history: in the early foundation years until 1956 a white/blue combination, with occasional use of white/light blue and red-blue; from 1956 until 2021 a yellow-blue pattern in different styles, inspired by the crest of Verona and already used by the main football team of the city Hellas Verona. After the refoundation of 2024 the club decided to keep the white-blue combination of the origins, already used by Clivense since 2021.

These are the most iconic football kits worn over the years:

1929-30	1931-32	1948-49	1959-60	1961-62	1967-68

1980-81	1984-85	1994-95	2001-02	2013-14	2024-25

=== Nicknames ===
The club's historic nickname is Gialloblu (from the club colours of yellow and blue), sharing it with the more famous local rivals Hellas Verona. Local supporters often call the club Ceo, which is Venetian for Chievo. The club is also sometimes referred to as the I Mussi Volanti ("The Flying Donkeys" in the Verona dialect of Venetian). "The Flying Donkeys" nickname was originally used by fans from crosstown rivals Hellas to mock Chievo. The two clubs first met in Serie B in the mid-1990s, with Hellas chanting Quando i mussi volara, il Ceo in Serie A – "Donkeys will fly before Chievo are in Serie A." However, once Chievo earned promotion to Serie A at the end of the 2000–01 Serie B season, Chievo fans started to call themselves "The Flying Donkeys".

==== Anthem ====
Chievo's official anthem is titled Chievo Verona, a world in yellow and blue, written and performed by Ivana Spagna; Their unofficial anthem is titled Fly with us and was created by Sonohra in September 2013.

== Current squad ==
As of 21 November 2026

Note: Flags indicate national team as defined under FIFA eligibility rules; some limited exceptions apply. Players may hold more than one non-FIFA nationality.

No.	Pos.	Nation	Player
1	GK	ITA	Andrea Petrone
3	DF	ITA	Marco Bortolotti
4	DF	ITA	Edoardo Sbampato
5	MF	ITA	Lorenzo Bordo
6	DF	ITA	Matteo Salvi
7	DF	ITA	Mauro Verzeletti
8	MF	ITA	Gabriele Carannante
9	FW	ALB	Dardan Vuthaj
10	MF	ITA	Nicola Ciccone
11	MF	ITA	Alessio De Cerchio
12	GK	ITA	Jacopo Smiderle
15	DF	ROU	Alexandru Ionițǎ
17	MF	ITA	Andrea Carbone
20	MF	GAM	Modou Jassey

No.	Pos.	Nation	Player
21	DF	AUT	Manuel Martic
22	GK	ITA	Jonas Arlanch (on loan from Scafatese)
24	DF	ITA	Luca Cantarella (on loan from Torino Primavera)
25	DF	ITA	Lorenzo Trillò
26	DF	ITA	Abdoul Hate Bane
43	FW	ITA	Alberto Paloschi (captain)
44	MF	ITA	Gerardo Agnelli
70	FW	ITA	Riccardo Zanfisi
72	DF	ITA	Edoardo Sturli (on loan from Fiorentina)
90	MF	ITA	Giovanni Trevisani
96	FW	ITA	Nicholas D'Este
99	MF	ITA	Anthony Minessi
–	DF	ITA	Maximiliano Uggè
–	DF	ITA	Oresti Nezha

== Retired numbers ==
- 30 (Democratic Republic of the Congo) Jason Mayélé, left/right winger, 2001–2002 (posthumous)
- 31 (Italy) Sergio Pellissier, left/right winger, 2000–2019 (retired in recognition of his career)

== Notable players ==
Note: this list includes players that have reached international status.

- (Italy) Francesco Acerbi
- (Italy) Amauri
- (Sweden) Daniel Andersson
- (Italy) Simone Barone
- (Italy) Massimo Marazzina
- (Italy) Andrea Barzagli
- (Albania) Erjon Bogdani
- (Germany) Oliver Bierhoff
- (Slovenia) Valter Birsa
- (Argentina) Albano Bizzarri
- (United States) Michael Bradley
- (Italy) Matteo Brighi
- (Slovenia) Boštjan Cesar
- (Italy) Bernardo Corradi
- (Peru) Rinaldo Cruzado
- (Italy) Dario Dainelli
- (Senegal) Boukary Dramé
- (Italy) Mauro Esposito
- (Paraguay) Marcelo Estigarribia
- (Montenegro) Ivan Fatić
- (Switzerland) Gelson Fernandes
- (Greece) Giannis Fetfatzidis
- (Italy) Stefano Fiore
- (Italy) Alessandro Gamberini
- (Italy) Massimo Gobbi
- (Netherlands) Jonathan de Guzmán
- (Finland) Përparim Hetemaj
- (Slovenia) Bojan Jokić
- (Bulgaria) Radoslav Kirilov
- (Poland) Kamil Kosowski
- (Italy) Nicola Legrottaglie
- (Ivory Coast) Christian Manfredini
- (Democratic Republic of the Congo) Jason Mayélé
- (Nigeria) Stephen Makinwa
- (Ghana) John Mensah
- (Nigeria) Victor Obinna
- (Italy) Sergio Pellissier
- (Italy) Simone Pepe
- (Italy) Simone Perrotta
- (Chile) Mauricio Pinilla
- (Italy) Giampiero Pinzi
- (Serbia) Ivan Radovanović
- (Italy) Flavio Roma
- (Italy) Eugenio Corini
- (Sweden) Fredrik Risp
- (Mali) Mamadou Samassa
- (Greece) Nikos Spyropoulos
- (Kosovo) (Albania) Samir Ujkani
- (Finland) Sauli Väisänen
- (Slovakia) Martin Valjent
- (Colombia) Mario Yepes

== Coaches ==
- Nicola Ciccolo (1974–78)
- Carlo De Angelis (1978–80), (1985–87)
- Gianni Bui (1988–91)
- Carlo De Angelis (1991–93)
- Alberto Malesani (1 Jun 1993–97)
- Silvio Baldini (Jul 1997–98)
- Domenico Caso (1 Jul 1998 – 14 Dec 1998)
- Luigi Delneri (1 Jul 2000 – 30 Jun 2004)
- Mario Beretta (15 Jun 2004 – 30 Jun 2005)
- Maurizio D'Angelo (2005)
- Giuseppe Pillon (1 Jul 2005 – 16 Oct 2006)
- Luigi Delneri (2006–07)
- Giuseppe Iachini (1 Jul 2007 – 3 Nov 2008)
- Domenico Di Carlo (4 Nov 2008 – 26 May 2010)
- Stefano Pioli (10 Jun 2010 – 2 Jun 2011)
- Domenico Di Carlo (9 Jun 2011 – 2 Oct 2012)
- Eugenio Corini (3 Oct 2012 – 30 Jun 2013)
- Giuseppe Sannino (1 Jul 2013 – 11 Nov 2013)
- Eugenio Corini (12 Nov 2013 – 19 Oct 2014)
- Rolando Maran (19 Oct 2014 – 29 Apr 2018)
- Lorenzo D'Anna (29 Apr 2018 – 9 Oct 2018)
- Gian Piero Ventura (10 Oct 2018 – 13 Nov 2018)
- Domenico Di Carlo (13 Nov 2018 – 1 Jun 2019)
- Michele Marcolini (4 Jul 2019 – 1 Dec 2020)
- Alfredo Aglietti (2 Dec 2020 – 1 Jul 2021)
- Marco Zaffaroni (2 Jul 2021 – 4 Aug 2021)
- Alessandro Pontarollo (8 Jun 2024 – 7 Oct 2024)
- Riccardo Allegretti (9 Oct 2024 – 1 Aug 2025)
- Fabrizio Cacciatore (1 Aug 2025 – 15 Dec 2025)
- Marco Didu (18 Dec 2025 – present)

== Fans ==
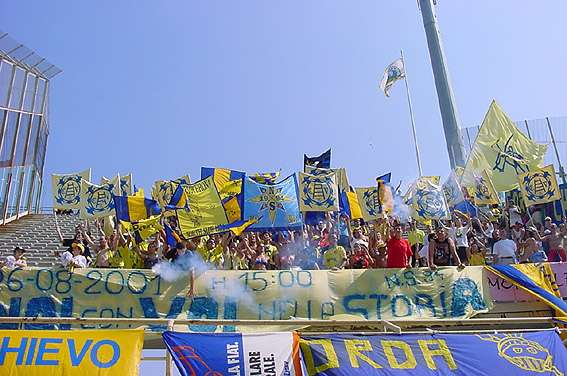
Chievo's supporters attending the club's first appearance in Serie A in Florence on August 26th 2001

The Clivense fan base has a few groups within it, but the best known are the North Side 94, a group of fans born in 1994 together with the promotion of the club to the Serie B. The supporters' group has given full support and to Sergio Pellissier's Clivense after the exclusion of ChievoVerona from all federal championships in 2021.

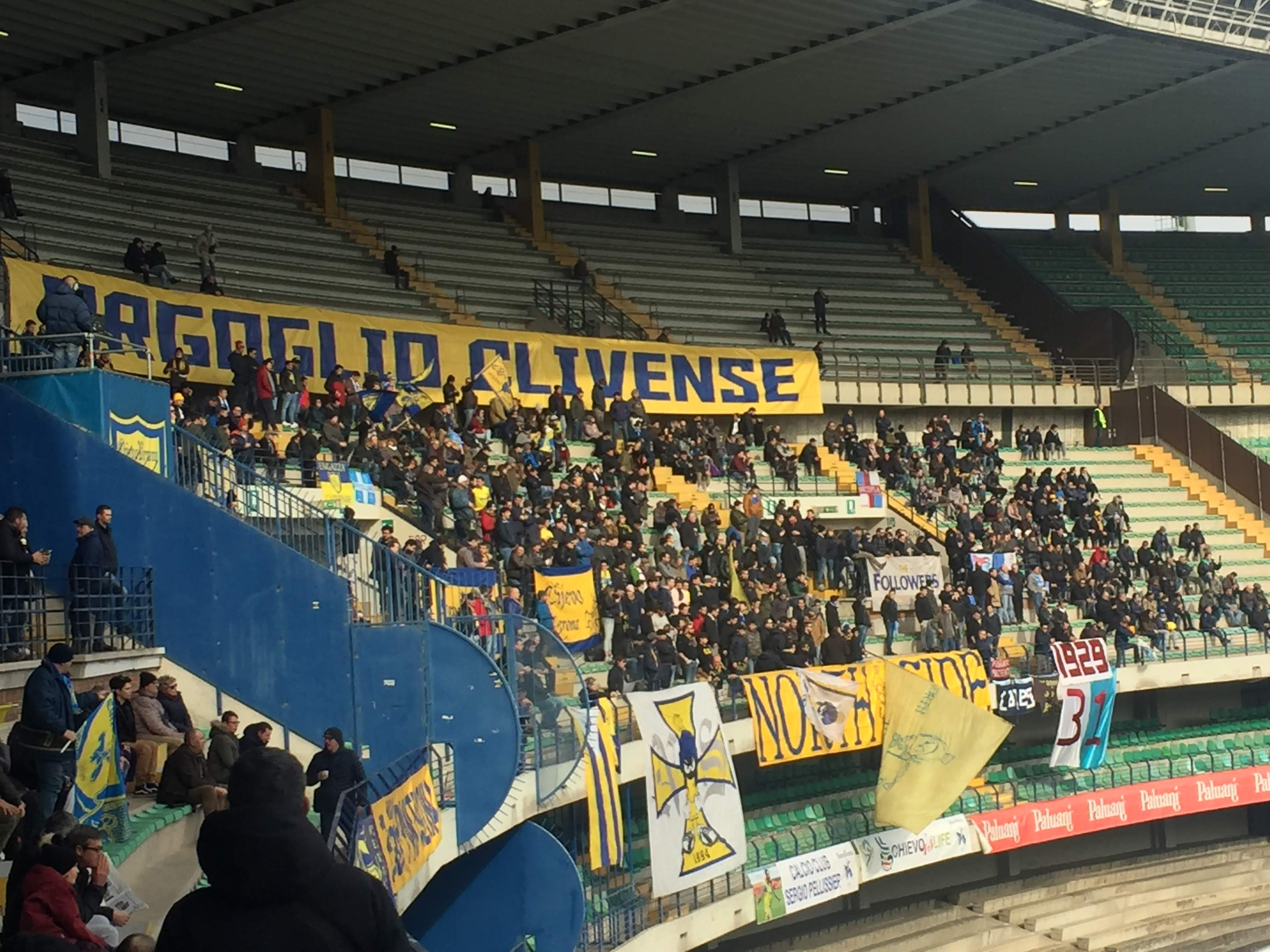
Local stand of Chievo's supporters at Stadio Marcantonio Bentegodi in 2019

== Stadium ==
ChievoVerona shared since its promotion to the Serie C2 in 1986 the Stadio Marcantonio Bentegodi with rival team Hellas Verona. Since the refoundation in 2024 the club plays its home games at Stadio Aldo Olivieri in Verona. During the three previous years FC Clivense was based at Stadio Comunale (Phoenix Arena for sponsorship reasons) in San Martino Buon Albergo.

== Honours ==
- Serie B
  - Winners: 2007–08
- Serie C1
  - Winners: 1993–94 (group A)
- Serie C2
  - Winners: 1988–89 (group B)
- Serie D
  - Winners: 1985–86 (group C)
- Eccellenza Veneto
  - Winners: 2022–2023 (group A)
- Terza Categoria Veneto
  - Winners: 2021–2022 (group B)

== In Europe ==
=== UEFA Champions League ===
Season	Round	Club	Home	Away	Aggregate
2006–07	Third qualifying round	(Bulgaria) Levski Sofia	2–2	0–2	2–4

=== UEFA Cup ===
Season	Round	Club	Home	Away	Aggregate
2002–03	First round	(Serbia and Montenegro) Red Star Belgrade	0–2	0–0	0–2
2006–07	First round	(Portugal) Braga	2–1 (a.e.t)	0–2	2–3
