= Alessio Girgi =

Italian footballer (born 2000)

Personal information
- Date of birth: 1 April 2000 (age 26)
- Place of birth: Genoa, Italy
- Height: 1.82 m (6 ft 0 in)
- Position: Defender

Team information
- Current team: Sanremese
- Number: 19

Youth career
- –2016: Genoa
- 2016–2020: Atalanta
- 2016–2017: → Genoa (loan)

Senior career*
| Years | Team | Apps | (Gls) |
| 2019–2022 | Atalanta | 0 | (0) |
| 2019–2020 | → Pergolettese (loan) | 7 | (0) |
| 2020–2021 | → Legnago (loan) | 25 | (0) |
| 2021–2022 | → Carrarese (loan) | 2 | (0) |
| 2022 | → Feralpisalò (loan) | 3 | (0) |
| 2022–2023 | Torres | 30 | (0) |
| 2023–2024 | Sangiuliano | 18 | (4) |
| 2024–2025 | Prato | 29 | (1) |
| 2025– | Sanremese | 23 | (2) |
- * Club domestic league appearances and goals as of 25 June 2026

Alessio Girgi (born 1 April 2000) is an Italian professional footballer who plays as a defender for Serie D club Sanremese.

== Club career ==
On 14 January 2022, he joined Feralpisalò in Serie C on loan.

On 5 December 2023, Girgi signed with Sangiuliano in Serie D.
