= Chievo =

- Frazione
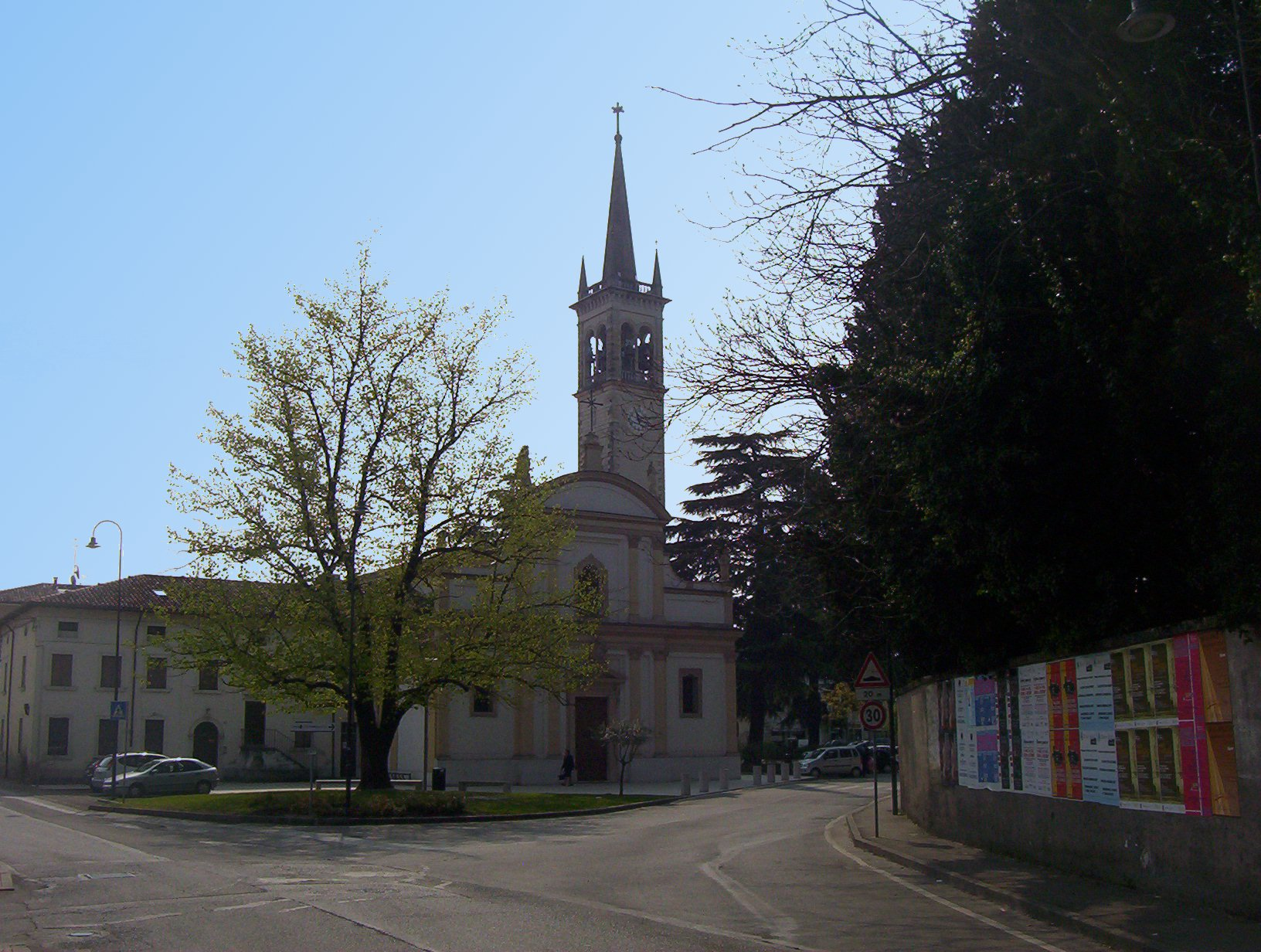
- View of the parish church of Chievo, dedicated to Saint Anthony the Abbot
- Interactive map of Chievo
- Coordinates: 45°27′28″N 10°56′47″E
- Country: Italy
- Region: Veneto
- Comune: Verona
- Demonym: Clivense (pl. clivensi)

Chievo (4,500 inhabitants) is a frazione of Verona located to the west of the city, around 4 kilometres (2 miles) from the historic city centre, on the shores of the river Adige.

It is best known for its football team, A.C. ChievoVerona.

== History ==
The name came from the Latin "clivium mantici" which means "the hill of the magic wood". Pastoral and farming activities date back to pre-Roman Celtic settlers. Placed on the shores of the river Adige the early inhabitants established a port, some mills and a water-powered saw on the river. Pipin, son of Charles, gifted the entire zone to the monastery of St. Procolo, near S. Zeno in Verona. In the 12th century Chievo had a church, a hospital and a stronghold in which Federico Barbarossa spent some nights. The Corte Bionde is the best preserved medieval building. Around 1450 the entire village was moved about 100 metres (328 ft) nearer to the city where the climate was healthier and vegetation more gorgeous. The actual parish church with a reliquary was built at that time. In 1892 the ten church bells were cast, and are still rung today in the style of the Veronese bellringing art.

== Points of interest ==
- Forte Chievo: polygonal fort built between 1850 and 1852 by the Austrians as part of Verona's defensive system.
- Villa Pellegrini Marioni Pullè: 17th–18th century villa; the walls of its estate fence the western side of Chievo's main square.

Nowadays it is owned by INPS (Italian national social security institute) and in a state of disrepair.

- Ponte diga del Chievo: dam and footbridge over the river Adige, built in the 1920s.
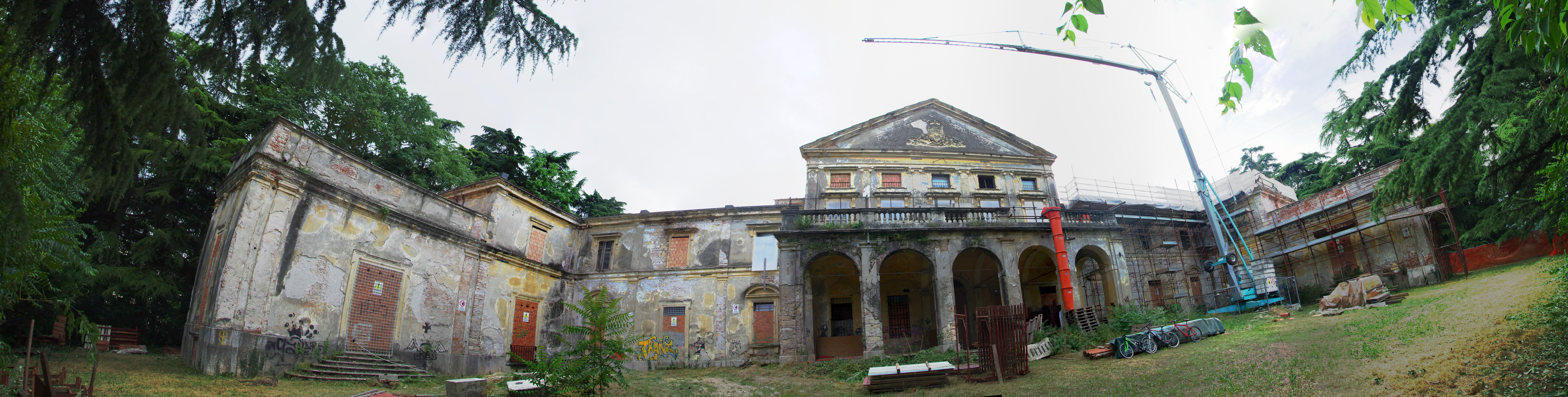
Façade of Villa Pellegrini Marioni Pullè, Chievo, June 2014

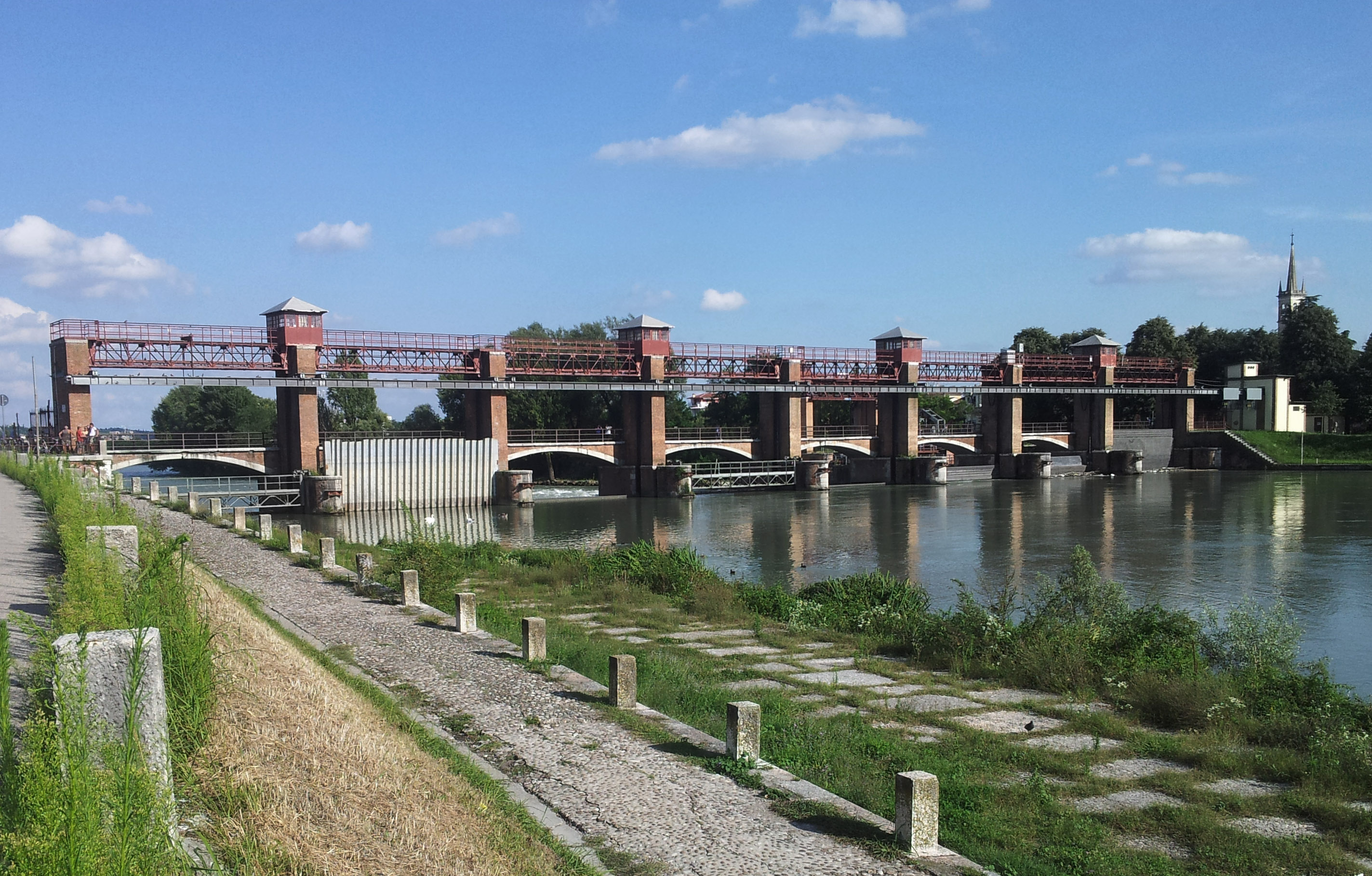
Diga del Chievo
