= 1998 Torneo di Viareggio =

1998 Torneo Mondiale di Calcio Coppa Carnevale
50° Torneo di Viareggio

Tournament details
- Host country: Italy
- City: Viareggio
- Dates: February 8, 1998 - February 23, 1998
- Teams: 32

Final positions
- Champions: (Italy) Torino
- Runners-up: (Brazil) Irineu
- Third place: (Italy) Bologna
- Fourth place: (Italy) Milan

Tournament statistics
- Matches played: 64
- Goals scored: 137 (2.14 per match)

The 1998 winners of the Torneo di Viareggio (in English, the Viareggio Tournament, officially the Viareggio Cup World Football Tournament Coppa Carnevale), the annual youth football tournament held in Viareggio, Tuscany, are listed below.

== Format ==
The 32 teams are seeded in 8 groups. Each team from a group meets the others in a single tie. The winning club and runners-up from each group progress to the final knockout stage. All matches in the final rounds are single tie. The Round of 16 envisions penalties and no extra time, while the rest of the final round matches include 30 minutes extra time and penalties to be played if the draw between teams still holds. Semifinal losing teams play 3rd-place final with penalties after regular time. The winning sides play the final with extra time and repeat the match if the draw holds.

== Participating teams ==
Italian teams

- (Italy) Atalanta
- (Italy) Bari
- (Italy) Bologna
- (Italy) Cagliari
- (Italy) Cremonese
- (Italy) Empoli
- (Italy) Fiorentina
- (Italy) Foggia
- (Italy) Genoa
- (Italy) Inter Milan
- (Italy) Juventus
- (Italy) Lazio
- (Italy) Lucchese
- (Italy) Milan
- (Italy) Napoli
- (Italy) Parma
- (Italy) Perugia
- (Italy) Ravenna
- (Italy) Roma
- (Italy) Savoia
- (Italy) Torino
- (Italy) Udinese
- (Italy) Venezia
- (Italy) Viareggio

European teams

- (Germany) Bayern München
- (England) Manchester United
- (Socialist Federal Republic of Yugoslavia) Partizan

American teams

- (Mexico) Pumas
- (Brazil) Vitória
- (Brazil) Nacional
- (Brazil) Irineu

Oceanian teams

- (Australia) Marconi Stallions

== Group stage ==
=== Group 1 ===
Team	Pts	Pld	W	D	L	GF	GA	GD
(Italy) Foggia	5	3	1	2	0	2	0	+2
(Italy) Cremonese	5	3	1	2	0	1	0	+1
(Italy) Fiorentina	2	3	0	2	1	2	3	-1
(Italy) Perugia	2	3	0	2	1	2	4	-2

=== Group 2 ===
Team	Pts	Pld	W	D	L	GF	GA	GD
(Italy) Torino	7	3	2	1	0	8	2	+6
(Italy) Bologna	7	3	2	1	0	6	4	+2
(Italy) Savoia	3	3	1	0	2	5	7	-2
(Australia) Marconi Stallions	0	3	0	0	3	2	8	-6

=== Group 3 ===
Team	Pts	Pld	W	D	L	GF	GA	GD
(Italy) Udinese	5	3	1	2	0	2	0	+2
(Italy) Inter Milan	4	3	1	1	1	3	2	+1
(Brazil) Vitória	4	3	1	1	1	2	3	-1
(Italy) Venezia	2	3	0	2	1	2	4	-2

=== Group 4 ===
Team	Pts	Pld	W	D	L	GF	GA	GD
(Italy) Lazio	7	3	2	1	0	4	1	+3
(Italy) Lucchese	6	3	2	0	1	5	2	+3
(Italy) Atalanta	4	3	1	1	1	5	4	+1
(Socialist Federal Republic of Yugoslavia) Partizan	0	3	0	0	3	1	8	-7

=== Group 5 ===
Team	Pts	Pld	W	D	L	GF	GA	GD
(Italy) Milan	7	3	2	1	0	6	3	+3
(Brazil) Irineu	6	3	2	0	1	5	3	+2
(Italy) Parma	2	3	0	2	1	3	4	-1
(England) Manchester United	1	3	0	1	2	0	4	-4

=== Group 6 ===
Team	Pts	Pld	W	D	L	GF	GA	GD
(Italy) Roma	7	3	2	1	0	13	2	+11
(Italy) Genoa	7	3	2	1	0	3	1	+2
(Germany) Bayern München	3	3	1	0	2	2	4	-2
(Italy) Viareggio	0	3	0	0	3	2	13	-11

=== Group 7 ===
Team	Pts	Pld	W	D	L	GF	GA	GD
(Italy) Bari	7	3	2	1	0	3	1	+2
(Italy) Juventus	6	3	2	0	1	4	1	+3
(Italy) Cagliari	4	3	1	1	1	3	4	-1
(Brazil) Nacional	0	3	0	0	3	1	5	-4

=== Group 8 ===
Team	Pts	Pld	W	D	L	GF	GA	GD
(Italy) Empoli	7	3	2	1	0	4	0	+4
(Italy) Ravenna	5	3	1	2	1	3	1	+2
(Mexico) Pumas	3	3	1	0	2	1	3	-2
(Italy) Napoli	1	3	0	1	2	1	5	-4

== Knockout stage ==
Round of 16
18 February
(Italy) Torino (pen)	0 (5)
(Italy) Cremonese	0 (4)
18 February
(Italy) Udinese (pen)	1 (5)
(Italy) Lucchese	1 (4)
18 February
(Italy) Inter Milan (pen)	0 (4)
(Italy) Lazio	0 (3)
18 February
(Italy) Bologna	2
(Italy) Foggia	1
18 February
(Italy) Milan	3
(Italy) Genoa	1
18 February
(Italy) Bari (pen)	0 (5)
(Italy) Ravenna	0 (4)
18 February
(Italy) Juventus (pen)	0 (4)
(Italy) Empoli	0 (3)
18 February
(Brazil) Irineu	2
(Italy) Roma	1

Quarter-finals
19 February
(Italy) Torino	2
(Italy) Udinese	1
19 February
(Italy) Inter Milan	0
(Italy) Bologna (a.e.t.)	1
19 February
(Italy) Milan	3
(Italy) Bari	1
19 February
(Italy) Juventus	1 (2)
(Brazil) Irineu (pen)	1 (4)

Semi-finals
21 February
(Italy) Torino	3
(Italy) Bologna	1
21 February
(Italy) Milan	0 (3)
(Brazil) Irineu (pen)	0 (5)

Final
23 February
(Italy) Torino	2
(Brazil) Irineu	0
Third place
23 February
(Italy) Bologna (pen)	2 (7)
(Italy) Milan	2 (6)

== Champions ==
Torneo di Viareggio 1998 Champions

Torino
6th time
