= Carlo De Angelis =

Italian football manager

Carlo De Angelis (born 12 March 1947) is an Italian football manager. He managed Chievoverona for many years in Serie C2 and Serie C1.

== Career ==
- 1976–1978 Chievo (Youths)
- 1978–1980 Chievo
- 1980–1983 Verona (Youths)
- 1983–1984 Pescantina
- 1984–1985 Benacense
- 1985–1987 Chievo
- 1987–1988 Chievo (Youths)
- 1988–1989 Rieti
- 1989–1991 Chievo (Youths)
- 1991–1993 Chievo
