= Angele Ishag =

Sudanese teacher

Angele Ishag Girgis
- Born: 1937 (age 88–89); Sudan
- Citizenship: Sudanese
- Occupations: Educator, teacher
- Known for: First Sudanese woman admitted to Gordon Memorial College

Angele Ishag Girgis (born 1937) was a Sudanese teacher. She was the first Sudanese woman to be admitted to the Gordon Memorial College, which later became the University of Khartoum.

== Life ==
Angele Ishag was a Christian Copt. She entered the Gordon Memorial College in 1945, graduating with a diploma from the school of Arts in 1948. She also gained a Diploma of Education from Edinburgh University in 1962.

Angele Ishag attended Women's Affairs Conferences in Greece, Egypt and Syria. From 1967 she was a secondary school teacher and headmistress. In 1976, when she was considered for an African Women Educators program sponsored by the United States, she was headmistress of Kassala Girls Higher Secondary School. She went on to be headmistress of Khartoum Secondary School for Girls and the Omdurman College for Girls (College for Home Science).
