= Elysian Shadows =

- Developer: GyroVorbis
- Publisher: WaterMelon
- Programmer: Falco Girgis
- Artist: Patryk Kowalik
- Engine: ESGamma
- Platforms: Dreamcast, Microsoft Windows, OS X, Linux, iOS, Android, Ouya
- Genre: Role-playing
- Modes: Single-player, multiplayer

Elysian Shadows is a vaporware multiplatform indie 2D role-playing video game that was in development by GyroVorbis. The game was set to be published by WaterMelon, which previously developed and published the Sega Genesis title Pier Solar and the Great Architects in 2010. The development of Elysian Shadows has been chronicled in a YouTube series titled Adventures in Game Development. Elysian Shadows has been marketed as a "next-gen 2D role-playing game" (RPG) due to its hybrid 2D/3D graphical style.

Elysian Shadows was being developed for the Dreamcast, as well as the Ouya, iOS, Android, Windows, OS X, and Linux platforms. The game received a successful round of crowdfunding via Kickstarter in August 2014. As of December 2024 no rewards have been delivered. The last Kickstarter update was published in 2017.

== Gameplay ==
Elysian Shadows intended to fuse traditional elements of 2D games with dynamic 2D and 3D perspectives, positional and dynamic audio, rigid body physics, particle simulators, and other modern 3D rendering techniques. This gameplay was intended as a re-invention of the 2D style used in 16-bit RPGs. Planned features for the game, in addition to its hybrid 2D/3D camera and gameplay, included: advanced fluid dynamics, weather and a day/night system, customizable characters with in-depth class/job system, and a cross-platform save system. VMU mini games have also been added to the game.

== Story ==
Elysian Shadows was to take place in a world caught in constant conflict between magic and technology. The gift of magic is bestowed upon loyal followers of The Creator, while the nonreligious sects of society are forced to rely upon technological advances in their daily lives. Upon uncovering a mysterious artifact deep within one of the ancient ruins scattered throughout the land, Julien and friends find themselves thrust into the middle of this mounting conflict, and they must now solve the mystery of the ancient civilizations to prevent the destruction of their own.

== Development ==
Since October 2007, the development of Elysian Shadows has been chronicled in the YouTube web series Adventures in Game Development however Falco Girgis' earliest post on the development forums was in 2004, leading to uncertainty as to when exactly development on the game began. The early years of development were spent on designing original technology and development tools. These tools were simultaneously developed for OS X and Windows. They were later designed to target a host of platforms including Android and Linux, which enabled the developers to design the game without worrying about porting. The team has gone through a large number of member changes, however lead programmer Falco Girgis and lead artist Patryk Kowalik have remained constant since Falco founded the project and Patryk joined.

In May 2014, it was announced that WaterMelon Co., developer of Pier Solar and the Great Architects, offered a publishing deal to the Elysian Shadows Team for the Dreamcast platform. In June, lead developer Falco Girgis tendered his resignation at ADTRAN, where he was a software engineer, to work full-time on Elysian Shadows. On June 19, Girgis and co-founder Tyler Rogers were invited to give a presentation of Elysian Shadows at their alumni university, University of Alabama in Huntsville.

On 1 August 2014, the development team launched their Kickstarter campaign with a goal of $150,000 and stretch goals that went up to $750,000. In less than 24 hours, the project had attained $30,000 of its target and a couple of days later it had successfully raised over $75,000. On 20 August, Elysian Shadows received national coverage by WHNT News as they interviewed the team and ran a story on Girgis and Rogers quitting their jobs to develop the game. Less than 24 hours later, the game was successfully funded and in the process set a record for the Ouya's Free the Games Fund as well as for the most money raised in Alabama through Kickstarter. In August 2014, the game received notable press coverage internationally coverage from Asia and Europe, most notably from Russia and Germany respectively.

The project received a great deal of criticism when Girgis created the Misadventures in Kickstarter crowdfunding series, in which he complained of hardships during the project's development. The video's description and Girgis's later commentary suggest it was satire.

In 2016, Girgis stated that progress on the game was going well in a post that describes setbacks caused by a former team member. He has also posted news about ElysianVMU, an emulator for the Dreamcast's Visual Memory Unit, allowing non-Dreamcast players to access VMU content on their PCs, smartphones, and other devices.

As of December 2024 the game has not been released and no update has been posted on the Kickstarter since 2017.
