= 2006–07 AS Roma season =

Roma
2006–07 season
- President: Rosella Sensi
- Manager: Luciano Spalletti
- Stadium: Stadio Olimpico
- Serie A: 2nd
- Coppa Italia: Winners
- UEFA Champions League: Quarter-finals
- Top goalscorer: League: Francesco Totti (26); All: Francesco Totti (32)
- Highest home attendance: 61,292 vs Lazio (29 April 2007, Serie A)
- Average home league attendance: 38,719
Home colours	Away colours	Third colours

During the 2006–07 football season, Associazione Sportiva Roma played its 74th Serie A league season, finishing 2nd. The club also competed in the UEFA Champions League, finishing as quarter-finalists, and the Coppa Italia, winning the trophy for the eighth time.

The season is mostly remembered for the collapse Roma suffered at the hands of Manchester United in the Champions League quarter-finals, United coming back from a 2–1 defeat in Rome to demolish the Italians 7–1 at Old Trafford.

== Season review ==
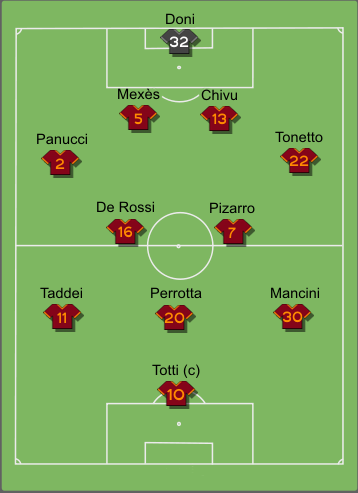
The typical Roma formation during the season

Roma finished the 2005–06 Serie A in fifth place, but after the sentences of the 2006 Italian football scandal that deducted all of Juventus's points and thirty each from Milan and Fiorentina, Roma finished second, behind Internazionale, thus gaining the qualification to the Champions League group stage.

The summer transfer window brought some changes in the Roma tactical formation, the most important being the signing of David Pizarro, a deep-lying playmaker that coach Luciano Spalletti had managed at Udinese, and considered fundamental for Roma's passing play. Another important signing was Max Tonetto, who took the place of left-back Leandro Cufré, who was sold to Monaco. Other players such as Mirko Vučinić, Matteo Ferrari, Marco Cassetti and Ricardo Faty were signed to boost the squad.

The first match of the season was the Supercoppa Italiana, against Inter, played on 26 August 2006 at the San Siro. In the 34th minute Roma were leading 3–0 with two goals by Alberto Aquilani and one by Mancini. However, the physical condition of the giallorossi was still weak and so, the nerazzurri succeeded in reaching the draw with two goals by Patrick Vieira and one by Hernán Crespo; in extra-time Inter scored the fourth and winning goal with a free kick by Luís Figo.

In the first part of the season Roma, Inter and Palermo raced to the top of the league early, but Inter started to lead the Serie A and kept first place until the end.

During the winter transfer window, Vincenzo Montella was loaned to English club Fulham as he was lacking game time and wanted to try his luck in the Premier League. He was replaced by Francesco Tavano and Christian Wilhelmsson, both signed on loan.

Roma were drawn into Group D of the 2006–07 UEFA Champions League, along with Valencia, Shakhtar Donetsk and Olympiacos. They finished second, behind Valencia, with 10 points (three wins, one draw and two defeats).

In the first knockout round Roma were drawn against Lyon, who had already won 6 consecutive French championships and were the favourites to pass the round; however, after a 0–0 draw at the Stadio Olimpico (with many controversial decisions by English referee Mike Riley, who yellow carded eleven players), Roma won 2–0 in the Stade de Gerland with goals from Francesco Totti and Mancini, the latter of whom scored a sensational goal, performing a total of five stepovers in front of Lyon's dazed defender Anthony Réveillère. In the quarter-finals Roma faced Manchester United. They won the first leg 2–1 with goals from Rodrigo Taddei and Mirko Vučinić, but, in the second leg, having been undefeated in 10 games in all competitions previously and having the then-best performing defense of the tournament, they suffered an amazing 7–1 defeat at Old Trafford.

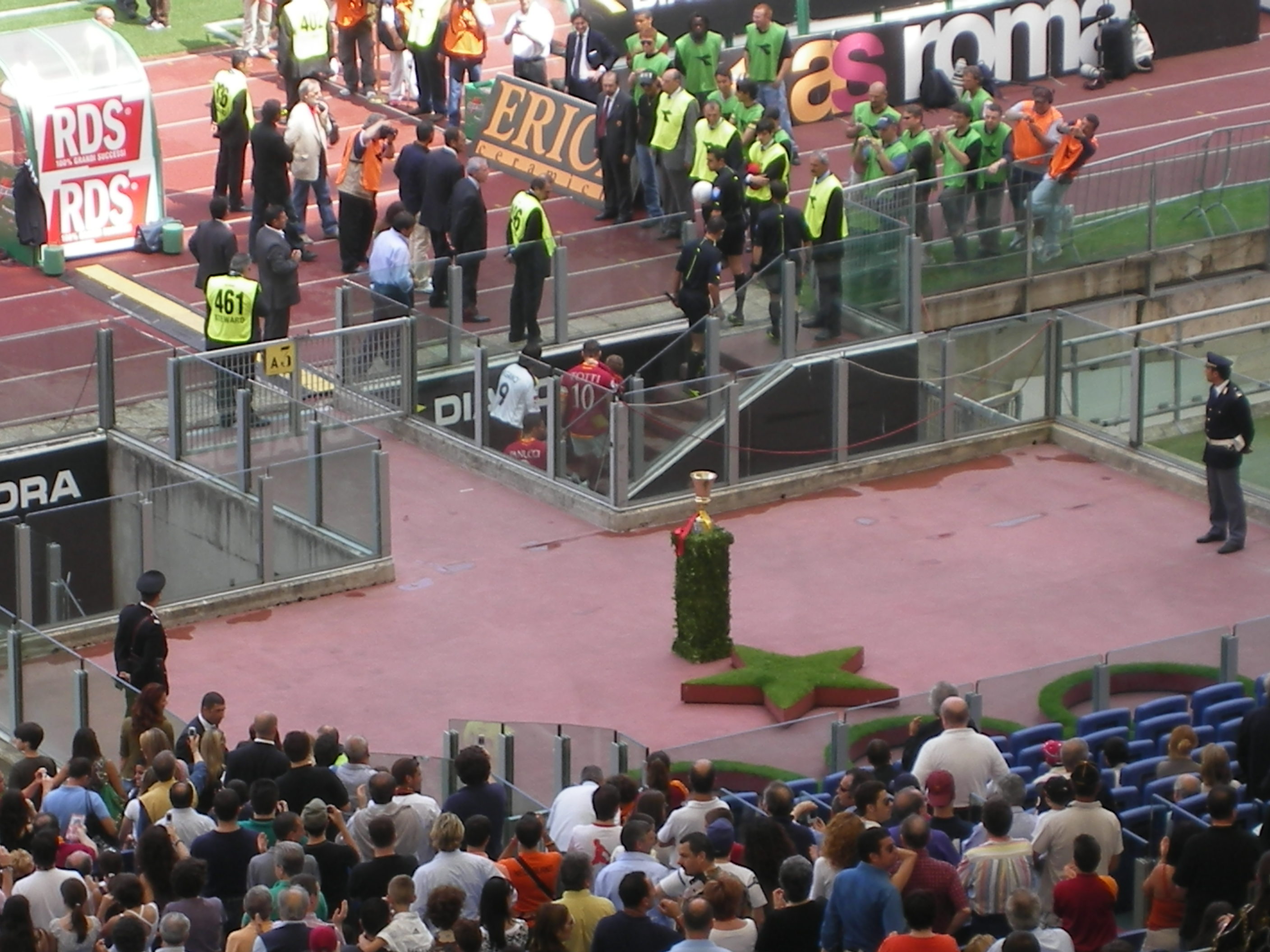
The Coppa Italia shown in the last Roma's match of the 2006–07 season

Roma won their eighth Coppa Italia after beating Triestina, Parma, Milan and finally Internazionale. Roma won the two final games with an aggregate result of 7–4; the first leg ended with a surprising 6–2 win while the second leg, though Inter's president Massimo Moratti claimed that they didn't care about the Coppa Italia, was played with animosity and determination by the nerazzurri, but the 2–1 final score gave the trophy to Roma.

Roma ended the 2006–07 Serie A season as runners-up, securing second place with three games to go, behind Internazionale. Although the nerazzurri dominated the championship, they lost the match against 'giallorossi' 3–1 at San Siro, the same stadium in which Roma also beat the 2007 Champions League winner Milan 2–1, with two goals from Francesco Totti. Totti scored a total of 32 goals in the season, and became the Serie A topscorer with 26 goals. He also won the European Golden Shoe, the trophy awarded to the top league goalscorer in Europe.

== Players ==
=== Squad information ===
Last updated on 27 May 2007
Appearances include league matches only

No.	Name	Nat	Position(s)	Date of birth (Age at end of season)	Signed from	Signed in	Apps.	Goals
Goalkeepers
1	Gianluca Curci	(Italy)	GK	12 July 1985 (aged 21)	(Italy) Youth Sector	2004	27	0
27	Júlio Sérgio	(Brazil)	GK	8 November 1978 (aged 28)	(Brazil) América	2006	0	0
32	Doni	(Brazil)	GK	22 October 1979 (aged 27)	(Brazil) Juventude	2005	60	0
Defenders
2	Christian Panucci (Vice-Captain)	(Italy)	RB / CB	12 April 1973 (aged 34)	(France) Monaco	2001	180	12
3	Gilberto Martínez	(Costa Rica)	RB / CB	1 October 1979 (aged 27)	(Italy) Brescia	2006	0	0
5	Philippe Mexès	(France)	CB	30 March 1982 (aged 25)	(France) Auxerre	2004	82	6
13	Cristian Chivu	(Romania)	LB / CB	26 October 1980 (aged 26)	(Netherlands) Ajax	2003	85	6
19	Rodrigo Defendi	(Brazil)	CB	16 June 1986 (aged 21)	(England) Tottenham Hotspur	2006	0	0
21	Matteo Ferrari	(Italy)	CB	5 December 1979 (aged 27)	(Italy) Parma	2004	62	2
22	Max Tonetto	(Italy)	LB	18 November 1974 (aged 32)	(Italy) Sampdoria	2006	30	0
28	Aleandro Rosi	(Italy)	RB	17 May 1987 (aged 20)	(Italy) Youth Sector	2004	37	2
77	Marco Cassetti	(Italy)	RB	29 May 1977 (aged 30)	(Italy) Lecce	2006	28	2
Midfielders
4	Christian Wilhelmsson	(Sweden)	LW	8 December 1979 (aged 27)	(France) Nantes	2007	19	1
7	David Pizarro	(Chile)	CM / DM	11 September 1979 (aged 27)	(Italy) Internazionale	2006	32	1
8	Alberto Aquilani	(Italy)	CM / AM	7 July 1984 (aged 22)	(Italy) Youth Sector	2002	67	4
11	Rodrigo Taddei	(Brazil)	LM / RM / AM	6 March 1980 (aged 27)	(Italy) Siena	2005	67	13
14	Ricardo Faty	(France)	DM / CM	4 August 1986 (aged 20)	(France) Strasbourg	2006	11	0
16	Daniele De Rossi	(Italy)	DM / CM	24 July 1983 (aged 23)	(Italy) Youth Sector	2001	121	12
18	Valerio Virga	(Italy)	CM	6 June 1986 (aged 21)	(Italy) Youth Sector	2004	10	0
20	Simone Perrotta	(Italy)	LM / CM / AM	17 September 1977 (aged 29)	(Italy) Chievo	2004	99	16
30	Mancini	(Brazil)	LW / RW / AM	1 August 1980 (aged 26)	(Italy) Venezia	2003	123	32
Forwards
10	Francesco Totti (Captain)	(Italy)	AM / LW / SS / CF / ST	27 September 1976 (aged 30)	(Italy) Youth Sector	1992	360	139
17	Francesco Tavano	(Italy)	CF / ST	2 March 1979 (aged 28)	(Italy) Empoli	2007	14	2
23	Mirko Vučinić	(Montenegro)	CF / ST	1 October 1983 (aged 23)	(Italy) Lecce	2006	25	2
35	Stefano Okaka	(Italy)	CF / ST	9 August 1989 (aged 17)	(Italy) Youth Sector	2005	14	1
Players transferred during the season
9	Vincenzo Montella	(Italy)	CF / ST	18 June 1974 (aged 33)	(Italy) Sampdoria	1999	180	83
24	Carlo Zotti	(Italy)	GK	3 September 1982 (aged 24)	(Italy) Palermo	2001	14	0
25	Leandro Cufré	(Argentina)	LB	9 May 1978 (aged 29)	(Argentina) Gimnasia La Plata	2002	69	1
99	Mido	(Egypt)	CF / ST	23 February 1983 (aged 24)	(France) Marseille	2004	8	0

== Competitions ==
=== Overall ===
Competition	Started round	Final position	First match	Last match
Serie A	Matchday 1	Runners-up	9 September 2006	27 May 2007
Supercoppa Italiana	Final	Runners-up	26 August 2006	
Coppa Italia	Round of 16	Winners	8 November 2006	17 May 2007
Champions League	Group stage	Quarter-finals	12 September 2006	10 April 2007

Last updated: 27 May 2007

=== Supercoppa Italiana ===
26 August 2006	Internazionale	4–3 (a.e.t.)	Roma	Milan
20:45 CEST (UTC+02:00)	Vieira 44', 74'; Crespo 65'; Figo 94'		Mancini 13'; Aquilani 25', 34'	Stadium: San Siro; Attendance: 45,528; Referee: Massimiliano Saccani

=== Serie A ===
==== League table ====
Pos	Team	Pld	W	D	L	GF	GA	GD	Pts	Qualification or relegation
1	Internazionale (C)	38	30	7	1	80	34	+46	97	Qualification to Champions League group stage (Note: Milan qualified for 2007–08 UEFA Champions League group stage instead of third qualifying round as the title holders.)
2	Roma	38	22	9	7	74	34	+40	75	Qualification to Champions League group stage
3	Lazio (Note: Fiorentina were docked 15 points, Reggina 11 points, Milan 8 points and Lazio 3 points, all for involvement in the 2006 Italian football scandal.)	38	18	11	9	59	33	+26	62	Qualification to Champions League third qualifying round
4	Milan	38	19	12	7	57	36	+21	61	Qualification to Champions League group stage
5	Palermo	38	16	10	12	58	51	+7	58	Qualification to UEFA Cup first round

Source: "Serie A 2006/2007 - 38. Round". worldfootball.net. 21 July 2025.
Rules for classification: 1) points; 2) goal difference; 3) number of goals scored.
(C) Champions

==== Results summary ====
Overall								Home						Away					
Pld	W	D	L	GF	GA	GD	Pts	W	D	L	GF	GA	GD	W	D	L	GF	GA	GD
38	22	9	7	74	34	+40	75	13	4	2	43	12	+31	9	5	5	31	22	+9

Last updated: 27 May 2007.
Source: Competitive matches

==== Results by round ====
Round	1	2	3	4	5	6	7	8	9	10	11	12	13	14	15	16	17	18	19	20	21	22	23	24	25	26	27	28	29	30	31	32	33	34	35	36	37	38
Ground	H	A	H	A	H	A	H	H	A	H	A	H	A	H	A	H	A	H	A	A	H	A	H	A	H	A	A	H	A	H	A	H	A	H	A	H	A	H
Result	W	W	L	W	W	L	D	D	W	W	W	W	W	W	L	W	W	W	D	D	W	W	W	L	W	D	D	W	D	D	W	W	L	D	W	L	L	W
Position	2	1	4	2	1	2	3	3	3	3	3	3	2	2	2	2	2	2	2	2	2	2	2	2	2	2	2	2	2	2	2	2	2	2	2	2	2	2

Source: Competitive matches
A = Away; H = Home; W = Win; D = Draw; L = Loss; = Leader, UEFA Champions League Groups stage; = UEFA Champions League Groups stage; = UEFA Champions League Qualifying round; = 2007–08 UEFA Cup; = 2007–08 Serie B

==== Matches ====
9 September 2006 1	Roma	2–0	Livorno	Rome
18:00 CEST (UTC+02:00)	De Rossi 45'; Tonetto (yellow card) 46'; Mancini 54'; Aquilani (yellow card) 75'	Report	Kuffour (yellow card) 21'; Balleri (yellow card) 60'	Stadium: Stadio Olimpico; Attendance: 38,529; Referee: Domenico Messina

17 September 2006 2	Siena	1–3	Roma	Siena
15:00 CEST (UTC+02:00)	Brevi (red card) 27'; Chiesa (yellow card) 30'; Antonini (yellow card) 58'; Bertotto (yellow card) 82'; Frick 87'	Report	Taddei 46'; Pizarro 71'; Okaka 90+2', (yellow card) 90+4'	Stadium: Stadio Artemio Franchi – Montepaschi Arena; Attendance: 11,136; Referee: Andrea De Marco

20 September 2006 3	Roma	0–1	Internazionale	Rome
20:30 CEST (UTC+02:00)	Panucci (yellow card) 39'; Mexès (yellow card) 53'; Perrotta (yellow card) 66'	Report	Vieira (yellow card) 15' (yellow-red card) 90+2'; Crespo 44'; Júlio César (yellow card) 89'	Stadium: Stadio Olimpico; Attendance: 57,157; Referee: Nicola Rizzoli

24 September 2006 4	Parma	0–4	Roma	Parma
15:00 CEST (UTC+02:00)	Budan (yellow card) 33'; Ciaramitaro (yellow card) 61'; Contini (yellow card) 72'	Report	Montella 5', (yellow card) 15'; Ferrari (yellow card) 17'; Perrotta 45+1'; Rosi 54'; Doni (yellow card) 56'; Aquilani 90+3'	Stadium: Stadio Ennio Tardini; Attendance: 15,495; Referee: Gianluca Rocchi

1 October 2006 5	Roma	1–0	Empoli	Rome
15:00 CEST (UTC+02:00)	Aquilani (yellow card) 20'; Montella 23'	Report		Stadium: Stadio Olimpico; Attendance: 35,197; Referee: Roberto Rosetti

15 October 2006 6	Reggina	1–0	Roma	Reggio Calabria
15:00 CEST (UTC+02:00)	Modesto (yellow card) 23'; Amoruso (yellow card) 35', (goal) 49'; Tedesco (yellow card) 37'; Amerini (yellow card) 51'; Aronica (yellow card) 75'; Esteves (yellow card) 81'	Report	Pizarro (yellow card) 4'; Rosi (yellow card) 21'; Cassetti (yellow card) 55'; Chivu (yellow card) 82'; Ferrari (yellow card) 90+2'	Stadium: Stadio Oreste Granillo; Attendance: 11,719; Referee: Matteo Trefoloni

22 October 2006 7	Roma	1–1	Chievo	Rome
15:00 CEST (UTC+02:00)	Totti 66'	Report	Pellissier 40'; Zanchetta (yellow card) 45+1'; Sicignano (yellow card) 51'	Stadium: Stadio Olimpico; Attendance: 34,000; Referee: Paolo Dondarini

25 October 2006 8	Roma	2–2	Ascoli	Rome
20:30 CEST (UTC+02:00)	Totti 50'; De Rossi (yellow card) 63'; Perrotta (yellow card) 65'; Pizarro (yellow card) 81'; Mexès 90+1'	Report	Delvecchio (yellow card) 10', (goal) 22'; Perrulli (yellow card) 45'; Pesce (yellow card) 45'; Năstase (yellow card) 49'; Bjelanović 64'; Pagliuca (yellow card) 66'	Stadium: Stadio Olimpico; Attendance: 32,187; Referee: Gianluca Rocchi

28 October 2006 9	Udinese	0–1	Roma	Udine
18:00 CEST (UTC+02:00)	Obodo (yellow card) 5'; Zapata (yellow card) 40'; Muntari (yellow card) 41' (red card) 70'; Zenoni (yellow card) 76'	Report	Rosi (yellow card) 32'; Ferrari 66', (yellow card) 70'; Chivu (yellow card) 81'	Stadium: Stadio Friuli; Attendance: 16,466; Referee: Paolo Bertini

5 November 2006 10	Roma	3–1	Fiorentina	Rome
20:30 CET (UTC+01:00)	Panucci (yellow card) 17'; Mexès (yellow card) 24'; De Rossi 38'; Taddei 49', 66'; Perrotta (yellow card) 85'	Report	Ujfaluši 15'; Mutu (yellow card) 45+1'	Stadium: Stadio Olimpico; Attendance: 37,585; Referee: Roberto Rosetti

11 November 2006 11	Milan	1–2	Roma	Milan
20:30 CET (UTC+01:00)	Brocchi 56', (yellow card) 72'; Oliveira (yellow card) 61'	Report	Totti 7', 83'; De Rossi (yellow card) 61'; Mancini (yellow card) 76'; Pizarro (yellow card) 85'	Stadium: San Siro; Attendance: 55,322; Referee: Domenico Messina

19 November 2006 12	Roma	7–0	Catania	Rome
15:00 CET (UTC+01:00)	Panucci 12', 48'; Mancini 18', (yellow card) 45+2'; Perrotta 24', 40'; Montella 59'; Totti 70'	Report	Mascara (red card) 15'; Stovini (yellow card) 21'; Baiocco (yellow card) 42' (yellow-red card) 89'	Stadium: Stadio Olimpico; Attendance: 46,503; Referee: Oscar Girardi

26 November 2006 13	Sampdoria	2–4	Roma	Genoa
15:00 CET (UTC+01:00)	Volpi 14', (yellow card) 45+2'; Parola (yellow card) 17'; Zenoni (yellow card) 43'; Flachi 90+2' (pen.)	Report	Totti 13', 74'; Chivu (yellow card) 18'; De Rossi (yellow card) 27'; Perrotta 33'; Panucci 44'	Stadium: Stadio Luigi Ferraris; Attendance: 22,929; Referee: Nicola Ayroldi

2 December 2006 14	Roma	2–1	Atalanta	Rome
20:30 CET (UTC+01:00)	Totti 50' (pen.), 64' (pen.); Mexès (yellow card) 71'; Cassetti (yellow card) 73'	Report	Zampagna 19'; Bellini (yellow card) 50'; Loria (yellow card) 52'; Donati (yellow card) 68' (red card) 90'; Bombardini (yellow card) 90+5'	Stadium: Stadio Olimpico; Attendance: 33,745; Referee: Oberdan Pantana

10 December 2006 15	Lazio	3–0	Roma	Rome
20:30 CET (UTC+01:00)	Mutarelli (yellow card) 14', (goal) 73'; Cribari (yellow card) 25'; Ledesma 44'; Mudingayi (yellow card) 48'; Oddo 52' (pen.); Zauri (yellow card) 54'; Mauri (yellow card) 64'	Report	Doni (yellow card) 51'; Totti (yellow card) 54'	Stadium: Stadio Olimpico; Attendance: 60,815; Referee: Roberto Rosetti

17 December 2006 16	Roma	4–0	Palermo	Rome
20:30 CET (UTC+01:00)	Panucci (yellow card) 25'; Mancini 44', 83', (yellow card) 64'; Totti 56' (pen.), 90+2'	Report	Amauri (yellow card) 27'; Pisano (yellow card) 56'; Simplício (yellow card) 78' (yellow-red card) 87'; Bresciano (yellow card) 79'	Stadium: Stadio Olimpico; Attendance: 40,124; Referee: Nicola Rizzoli

20 December 2006 17	Torino	1–2	Roma	Turin
20:30 CET (UTC+01:00)	Franceschini (red card) 24'; Gallo (yellow card) 30'; Rosina 88'; Balestri (yellow card) 90+4'	Report	Totti 38'; Cassetti (yellow card) 65'; Montella (yellow card) 74'; Mancini 81'; Ferrari (yellow card) 90+2'	Stadium: Stadio Olimpico di Torino; Attendance: 21,320; Referee: Gianluca Paparesta

23 December 2006 18	Roma	2–0	Cagliari	Rome
15:00 CET (UTC+01:00)	Taddei 5'; Mancini 56'; Mexès (yellow card) 64'	Report	Pisano (yellow card) 32'; Biondini (yellow card) 42'	Stadium: Stadio Olimpico; Attendance: 36,602; Referee: Paolo Tagliavento

14 January 2007 19	Messina	1–1	Roma	Messina
15:00 CET (UTC+01:00)	De Vezze (yellow card) 16'; Parisi (yellow card) 76' (yellow-red card) 90+3', (goal) 90+2' (pen.)	Report	Mancini 39'; De Rossi (yellow card) 55'; Pizarro (yellow card) 59'; Wilhelmsson (yellow card) 88'	Stadium: Stadio San Filippo; Attendance: 12,974; Referee: Gianluca Rocchi

21 January 2007 20	Livorno	1–1	Roma	Livorno
15:00 CET (UTC+01:00)	Lucarelli 22' (pen.); Filippini (yellow card) 26'; Kuffour (yellow card) 35'; Pasquale (yellow card) 46'; Galante (yellow card) 90+2'	Report	Taddei (yellow card) 45+1'; Wilhelmsson (yellow card) 51'; Totti 74'	Stadium: Stadio Armando Picchi; Attendance: 10,389; Referee: Nicola Ayroldi

28 January 2007 21	Roma	1–0	Siena	Rome
15:00 CET (UTC+01:00)	Vučinić 62', (yellow card) 63'; Panucci (yellow card) 77'	Report	Portanova (yellow card) 60'; Rinaudo (yellow card) 66'; Locatelli (red card) 90+1'	Stadium: Stadio Olimpico; Attendance: 30,824; Referee: Antonio Danilo Giannoccaro

11 February 2007 23	Roma	3–0	Parma	Rome
15:00 CET (UTC+01:00)	Totti 50'; Cassetti (yellow card) 56'; Perrotta 66'; Taddei 90+5'	Report	Parravicini (yellow card) 10'; Rossi (yellow card) 37'; Bolaño (yellow card) 46'; Contini (yellow card) 60'; Couto (yellow card) 89' (red card) 89'	Stadium: Stadio Olimpico; Attendance: 28,897; Referee: Matteo Trefoloni

17 February 2007 24	Empoli	1–0	Roma	Empoli
15:00 CET (UTC+01:00)	Pozzi 5'; Tosto (yellow card) 19' (yellow-red card) 90'; Pratali (yellow card) 29'; Almirón (yellow card) 33'	Report	Cassetti (yellow card) 29'	Stadium: Stadio Carlo Castellani; Attendance: 0 Referee: Paolo Dondarini

25 February 2007 25	Roma	3–0	Reggina	Rome
15:00 CET (UTC+01:00)	Mexès (yellow card) 42', (goal) 65'; Pizarro (yellow card) 45'; Tavano 55'; Panucci 90'; Totti (yellow card) 90+2'	Report	Foggia (yellow card) 4'; Mesto (yellow card) 49'; Bianchi (yellow card) 88'	Stadium: Stadio Olimpico; Attendance: 30,386; Referee: Paolo Tagliavento

28 February 2007 26	Chievo	2–2	Roma	Verona
15:00 CET (UTC+01:00)	Bogdani 17', (yellow card) 53'; Semioli 33'; D'Anna (yellow card) 49'; Moro (yellow card) 52'	Report	Totti 34', 48'; Mexès (yellow card) 51'; Pizarro (yellow card) 71'; Perrotta (yellow card) 84'; Ferrari (yellow card) 88'	Stadium: Stadio Marc'Antonio Bentegodi; Attendance: 4,221; Referee: Paolo Bertini

3 March 2007 27	Ascoli	1–1	Roma	Ascoli Piceno
15:00 CET (UTC+01:00)	Corallo (yellow card) 22'; Soncin 31', (yellow card) 54'; Budyanskiy (yellow card) 37'; Năstase (yellow card) 60'; Eleftheropoulos (yellow card) 89'	Report	Faty (yellow card) 26'; Wilhelmsson 85'	Stadium: Stadio Cino e Lillo Del Duca; Attendance: 4,800; Referee: Massimiliano Saccani

11 March 2007 28	Roma	3–1	Udinese	Rome
20:30 CET (UTC+01:00)	Totti 33' (pen.), 60'; Perrotta 39'	Report	Muntari (yellow card) 45+2'; Obodo (yellow card) 54'; Gyan 69'	Stadium: Stadio Olimpico; Attendance: 30,817; Referee: Paolo Mazzoleni

18 March 2007 29	Fiorentina	0–0	Roma	Florence
15:00 CET (UTC+01:00)	Dainelli (yellow card) 11' (yellow-red card) 33'; Mutu (yellow card) 70'	Report	Mexès (yellow card) 32'; De Rossi (yellow card) 89'	Stadium: Stadio Artemio Franchi; Attendance: 23,900; Referee: Gianluca Paparesta

31 March 2007 30	Roma	1–1	Milan	Rome
20:30 CEST (UTC+02:00)	Mexès 4'; Cassetti (yellow card) 61'; Chivu (yellow card) 90'; Pizarro (yellow card) 90+1'	Report	Favalli (yellow card) 16'; Cafu (yellow card) 43'; Gilardino 62'	Stadium: Stadio Olimpico; Attendance: 43,830; Referee: Domenico Messina

7 April 2007 31	Catania	0–2	Roma	Lecce
15:00 CEST (UTC+02:00)	Sardo (yellow card) 36'; Edusei (yellow card) 43'; Mascara (yellow card) 56'; Vargas (yellow card) 82'	Report	Rosi (yellow card) 16'; Tavano 37'; Faty (yellow card) 43'; Perrotta (yellow card) 54'; Vučinić 83'	Stadium: Stadio Via del Mare; Attendance: 0 Referee: Tiziano Pieri

15 April 2007 32	Roma	4–0	Sampdoria	Rome
15:00 CEST (UTC+02:00)	Totti 21', 66'; De Rossi (yellow card) 63'; Ferrari 71'; Panucci 87'	Report	Delvecchio (yellow card) 47'; Accardi (yellow card) 85'	Stadium: Stadio Olimpico; Attendance: 31,875; Referee: Emidio Morganti

18 April 2007 22	Internazionale	1–3	Roma	Milan
17:30 CEST (UTC+02:00)	Figo (yellow card) 28'; Zanetti (yellow card) 48'; Materazzi 52' (pen.), (yellow card) 83'; Stanković (yellow card) 77'	Report	Perrotta 44'; Doni (yellow card) 50'; Mancini (yellow card) 50'; Pizarro (yellow card) 53'; Mexès (yellow card) 55'; Totti 89'; Cassetti 90+5'	Stadium: San Siro; Attendance: 56,577; Referee: Matteo Trefoloni

22 April 2007 33	Atalanta	2–1	Roma	Bergamo
15:00 CEST (UTC+02:00)	Talamonti (yellow card) 26'; Doni 37', (yellow card) 41'; Zampagna 44', (yellow card) 45'	Report	Tonetto (yellow card) 45+1'; Panucci (yellow card) 51'; Vučinić (yellow card) 63'; Perrotta 64'; Cassetti (yellow card) 76'; Ferrari (red card) 90+3'	Stadium: Stadio Atleti Azzurri d'Italia; Attendance: 12,258; Referee: Roberto Rosetti

29 April 2007 34	Roma	0–0	Lazio	Rome
15:00 CEST (UTC+02:00)	Mexès (yellow card) 32'; De Rossi (yellow card) 43'; Wilhelmsson (yellow card) 65'	Report	Mutarelli (yellow card) 10'; Mudingayi (yellow card) 28'; Behrami (yellow card) 65'; Zauri (yellow card) 90+4'	Stadium: Stadio Olimpico; Attendance: 61,292; Referee: Nicola Rizzoli

6 May 2007 35	Palermo	1–2	Roma	Palermo
15:00 CEST (UTC+02:00)	Biava (yellow card) 20'; Tedesco 86'; Brienza (yellow card) 90+3'	Report	Totti 17'; Cassetti 36'; Panucci (yellow card) 58'; Ferrari (yellow card) 66'	Stadium: Stadio Renzo Barbera; Attendance: 24,680; Referee: Paolo Tagliavento

13 May 2007 36	Roma	0–1	Torino	Rome
15:00 CEST (UTC+02:00)	Chivu (yellow card) 65'	Report	Muzzi 14'; Franceschini (yellow card) 21'; Di Loreto (yellow card) 57'; Ardito (yellow card) 60'; Ogbonna (yellow card) 68'; Balestri (yellow card) 89'	Stadium: Stadio Olimpico; Attendance: 32,242; Referee: Gianluca Rocchi

20 May 2007 37	Cagliari	3–2	Roma	Cagliari
15:00 CEST (UTC+02:00)	Suazo 13'; Biondini (yellow card) 29'; Marchini 39', 68'	Report	Totti 30' (pen.), 85'; Mexès (yellow card) 56'; Aquilani (yellow card) 59'	Stadium: Stadio Sant'Elia; Attendance: 15,000; Referee: Christian Brighi

27 May 2007 38	Roma	4–3	Messina	Rome
15:00 CEST (UTC+02:00)	Totti 10', 73'; Mancini 19'; Rosi 83'	Report	Riganò 9', 58'; Masiello (yellow card) 55'; Córdova 75'; Pestrin (yellow card) 90+1'	Stadium: Stadio Olimpico; Attendance: 53,872; Referee: Nicola Pierpaoli

=== Coppa Italia ===
==== Round of 16 ====
8 November 2006 First leg	Triestina	1–2	Roma	Trieste
20:30 CET (UTC+01:00)	Rossetti 77'		Montella 44', 49'	Stadium: Stadio Nereo Rocco; Referee: Luca Banti

29 November 2006 Second leg	Roma	2–0 (4–1 agg.)	Triestina	Rome
17:00 CET (UTC+01:00)	Virga 22'; Montella 27'			Stadium: Stadio Olimpico; Referee: Roland Herberg

==== Quarter-finals ====
10 January 2007 First leg	Roma	2–1	Parma	Rome
21:00 CET (UTC+01:00)	Mancini 19'; Totti 67'		Dedić 88'	Stadium: Stadio Olimpico; Referee: Luca Banti

17 January 2007 Second leg	Parma	2–2 (3–4 agg.)	Roma	Parma
17:30 CET (UTC+01:00)	Muslimović 12', 43'		De Rossi 30'; Pizarro 85'	Stadium: Stadio Ennio Tardini; Referee: Mauro Bergonzi

==== Semi-finals ====
25 January 2007 First leg	Milan	2–2	Roma	Milan
21:15 CET (UTC+01:00)	Oliveira 4'; Inzaghi 23'		Perrotta 29'; Pizarro 38'	Stadium: San Siro; Referee: Paolo Bertini

31 January 2007 Second leg	Roma	3–1 (5–3 agg.)	Milan	Rome
21:15 CET (UTC+01:00)	Mancini 8'; Perrotta 23'; Pizarro 46'		Gilardino 18'	Stadium: Stadio Olimpico; Referee: Nicola Rizzoli

==== Final ====
9 May 2007 First leg	Roma	6–2	Internazionale	Rome
18:00 CEST (UTC+02:00)	Totti 1'; De Rossi 5'; Perrotta 15'; Mancini 30'; Panucci 54', 89'		Crespo 20', 56'	Stadium: Stadio Olimpico; Attendance: 39,095; Referee: Massimiliano Saccani

17 May 2007 Second leg	Internazionale	2–1 (4–7 agg.)	Roma	Milan
17:30 CEST (UTC+02:00)	Crespo 50'; Cruz 55'		Perrotta 84'	Stadium: San Siro; Attendance: 26,606; Referee: Emidio Morganti

=== UEFA Champions League ===
==== Group stage ====
Pos	Team	Pld	W	D	L	GF	GA	GD	Pts	Qualification
1	(Spain) Valencia	6	4	1	1	12	6	+6	13	Advance to knockout stage
2	(Italy) Roma	6	3	1	2	8	4	+4	10	Advance to knockout stage
3	(Ukraine) Shakhtar Donetsk	6	1	3	2	6	11	−5	6	Transfer to UEFA Cup
4	(Greece) Olympiacos	6	0	3	3	6	11	−5	3	

Source: RSSSF

12 September 2006 1	Roma (Italy)	4–0	(Ukraine) Shakhtar Donetsk	Rome, Italy
20:45 CEST (UTC+02:00)	Aquilani (yellow card) 30'; Taddei 67'; Totti 76'; De Rossi 79'; Pizarro 89'	Report	Marica (yellow card) 14'; Tymoshchuk (yellow card) 29'; Hübschman (yellow card) 84'	Stadium: Stadio Olimpico; Referee: Bertrand Layec (France)

27 September 2006 2	Valencia (Spain)	2–1	(Italy) Roma	Valencia, Spain
20:45 CEST (UTC+02:00)	Angulo 13'; Ayala (yellow card) 18'; Villa 29'; Albelda (yellow card) 36'	Report	Totti 18' (pen.); Ferrari (yellow card) 74'; De Rossi (yellow card) 80'; Pizarro (yellow card) 90+2'	Stadium: Mestalla; Attendance: 41,000; Referee: Herbert Fandel (Germany)

18 October 2006 3	Olympiacos (Greece)	0–1	(Italy) Roma	Piraeus, Greece
20:45 CEST (UTC+02:00)		Report	Tonetto (yellow card) 3'; Perrotta 76'	Stadium: Karaiskakis Stadium; Referee: Graham Poll (England)

31 October 2006 4	Roma (Italy)	1–1	(Greece) Olympiacos	Rome, Italy
20:45 CET (UTC+01:00)	Totti 66', (yellow card) 90+4'; Pizarro (yellow card) 90+2'	Report	Júlio César 19', (yellow card) 31'; Kostoulas (yellow card) 26'; Konstantinou (yellow card) 47'; Đorđević (yellow card) 79'; Nikopolidis (yellow card) 90+4'	Stadium: Stadio Olimpico; Referee: Olegário Benquerença (Portugal)

22 November 2006 5	Shakhtar Donetsk (Ukraine)	1–0	(Italy) Roma	Donetsk, Ukraine
20:45 CET (UTC+01:00)	Marica 61'	Report	Perrotta (yellow card) 45+2'; Mexès (yellow card) 84'; Cassetti (yellow card) 84'; Pizarro (yellow card) 89'	Stadium: RSC Olimpiyskiy; Referee: Wolfgang Stark (Germany)

5 December 2006 6	Roma (Italy)	1–0	(Spain) Valencia	Rome, Italy
20:45 CET (UTC+01:00)	Panucci 13'	Report	Cerra (yellow card) 79'	Stadium: Stadio Olimpico; Attendance: 42,000; Referee: Konrad Plautz (Austria)

==== Knockout phase ====
===== Round of 16 =====
21 February 2007 First leg	Roma (Italy)	0–0	(France) Lyon	Rome, Italy
20:45 CET (UTC+01:00)	Mexès (yellow card) 2'; Panucci (yellow card) 7'; Pizarro (yellow card) 18'; Mancini (yellow card) 43'; Taddei (yellow card) 57'; Totti (yellow card) 82'; Tonetto (yellow card) 89'; De Rossi (yellow card) 90+1'	Report	Juninho (yellow card) 12'; Govou (yellow card) 45'; Toulalan (yellow card) 49'	Stadium: Stadio Olimpico; Attendance: 55,000; Referee: Mike Riley (England)

6 March 2007 Second leg	Lyon (France)	0–2 (0–2 agg.)	(Italy) Roma	Lyon, France
20:45 CET (UTC+01:00)	Tiago (yellow card) 56'; Cris (yellow card) 63'; Källström (yellow card) 76'; Fred (yellow card) 90+3'	Report	Totti 22'; Mancini 44'; Perrotta (yellow card) 79'; Pizarro (yellow card) 90+1'	Stadium: Stade de Gerland; Attendance: 41,000; Referee: Manuel Mejuto González (Spain)

===== Quarter-finals =====
4 April 2007 First leg	Roma (Italy)	2–1	(England) Manchester United	Rome, Italy
20:45	Perrotta (yellow card) 42'; Taddei 44'; Vučinić 66'	Report	Scholes (yellow card) 26' (yellow-red card) 34'; Rooney 60'; Solskjær (yellow card) 70'; Heinze (yellow card) 87'	Stadium: Stadio Olimpico; Attendance: 77,000; Referee: Herbert Fandel (Germany)

10 April 2007 Second leg	Manchester United (England)	7–1 (8–3 agg.)	(Italy) Roma	Manchester, England
20:45	Carrick 11', 60'; Smith 17', (yellow card) 41'; Rooney 19'; Ferdinand (yellow card) 42'; Ronaldo 44', 49'; Evra 81'	Report	De Rossi 69'; Cassetti (yellow card) 76'; Mexès (yellow card) 82'	Stadium: Old Trafford; Attendance: 74,476; Referee: Ľuboš Micheľ (Slovakia)

== Statistics ==
=== Appearances and goals ===
No.	Pos	Nat	Player	Total		Serie A		Coppa Italia		Champions League	
No.	Pos	Nat	Player	Apps	Goals	Apps	Goals	Apps	Goals	Apps	Goals
32	GK	(Brazil) BRA	Doni	33	0	32	0	1	0	0	0
2	DF	(Italy) ITA	Christian Panucci	34	5	30+3	5	1	0	0	0
5	DF	(France) FRA	Philippe Mexès	28	3	27	3	1	0	0	0
13	DF	(Romania) ROU	Cristian Chivu	27	0	26	0	1	0	0	0
22	DF	(Italy) ITA	Max Tonetto	31	0	27+3	0	0+1	0	0	0
16	DM	(Italy) ITA	Daniele De Rossi	37	2	34+2	2	1	0	0	0
7	DM	(Chile) CHI	David Pizarro	32	1	30+2	1	0	0	0	0
11	MF	(Brazil) BRA	Rodrigo Taddei	30	5	25+4	5	1	0	0	0
20	MF	(Italy) ITA	Simone Perrotta	35	8	32+2	8	1	0	0	0
30	MF	(Brazil) BRA	Mancini	30	9	25+4	8	1	1	0	0
10	FW	(Italy) ITA	Francesco Totti	36	26	35	26	1	0	0	0
1	GK	(Italy) ITA	Gianluca Curci	6	0	6	0	0	0	0	0
21	DF	(Italy) ITA	Matteo Ferrari	27	2	24+3	2	0	0	0	0
77	DF	(Italy) ITA	Marco Cassetti	29	2	18+10	2	0+1	0	0	0
4	MF	(Sweden) SWE	Christian Wilhelmsson	19	1	12+7	1	0	0	0	0
8	MF	(Italy) ITA	Alberto Aquilani	14	3	9+4	1	1	2	0	0
17	FW	(Italy) ITA	Francesco Tavano	14	2	7+7	2	0	0	0	0
23	FW	(Montenegro) MNE	Mirko Vučinić	25	2	5+20	2	0	0	0	0
28	DF	(Italy) ITA	Aleandro Rosi	19	2	5+14	2	0	0	0	0
14	MF	(France) FRA	Ricardo Faty	11	0	3+8	0	0	0	0	0
18	MF	(Italy) ITA	Valerio Virga	4	0	1+3	0	0	0	0	0
35	FW	(Italy) ITA	Stefano Okaka	6	1	0+6	1	0	0	0	0
27	GK	(Brazil) BRA	Júlio Sérgio	0	0	0	0	0	0	0	0
3	DF	(Costa Rica) CRC	Gilberto Martínez	0	0	0	0	0	0	0	0
19	DF	(Brazil) BRA	Rodrigo Defendi	0	0	0	0	0	0	0	0
Players transferred out during the season
9	FW	(Italy) ITA	Vincenzo Montella	17	6	5+7	3	2	3	0+3	0
25	DF	(Argentina) ARG	Leandro Cufré	0	0	0	0	0	0	0	0
99	FW	(Egypt) EGY	Mido	0	0	0	0	0	0	0	0

Last updated: 27 May 2007
Source: Competitions

=== Goalscorers ===
Rank	No.	Pos	Nat	Name	Serie A	Supercoppa	Coppa Italia	UEFA CL	Total
1	10	FW	(Italy)	Francesco Totti	26	0	2	4	32
2	20	MF	(Italy)	Simone Perrotta	8	0	4	1	13
2	30	MF	(Brazil)	Mancini	8	1	3	1	13
4	2	DF	(Italy)	Christian Panucci	5	0	2	1	8
5	11	MF	(Brazil)	Rodrigo Taddei	5	0	0	2	7
6	9	FW	(Italy)	Vincenzo Montella	3	0	3	0	6
6	16	MF	(Italy)	Daniele De Rossi	2	0	2	2	6
8	7	MF	(Chile)	David Pizarro	1	0	3	1	5
9	5	DF	(France)	Philippe Mexès	3	0	0	0	3
9	8	MF	(Italy)	Alberto Aquilani	1	2	0	0	3
9	23	FW	(Montenegro)	Mirko Vučinić	2	0	0	1	3
12	17	FW	(Italy)	Francesco Tavano	2	0	0	0	2
12	21	DF	(Italy)	Matteo Ferrari	2	0	0	0	2
12	28	MF	(Italy)	Aleandro Rosi	2	0	0	0	2
12	77	DF	(Italy)	Marco Cassetti	2	0	0	0	2
16	4	MF	(Sweden)	Christian Wilhelmsson	1	0	0	0	1
16	18	MF	(Italy)	Valerio Virga	0	0	1	0	1
16	35	FW	(Italy)	Stefano Okaka	1	0	0	0	1
Own goal					0	0	0	0	0
Totals					74	3	20	13	110

Last updated: 27 May 2007

=== Clean sheets ===
Rank	No.	Pos	Nat	Name	Serie A	Supercoppa	Coppa Italia	UEFA CL	Total
1	32	GK	(Brazil)	Doni	13	0	0	5	18
2	1	GK	(Italy)	Gianluca Curci	1	0	1	0	2
Totals					14	0	1	5	20

Last updated: 27 May 2007
