= 2004–05 ACF Fiorentina season =

Fiorentina
2004–05 season
- President: Andrea Della Valle
- Manager: Emanuele Mondonico; Sergio Buso; Dino Zoff
- Stadium: Stadio Artemio Franchi
- Serie A: 16th
- Coppa Italia: Quarter-finals
- Top goalscorer: League: Fabrizio Miccoli (12); All: Fabrizio Miccoli (12)
Home colours	Away colours

ACF Fiorentina returned to Serie A, following a two-year absence after the bankruptcy of the previous incarnation of the club. Fiorentina returned only due to the expansion in terms of the number of top-league teams, and therefore had to significantly strengthen the squad in pre-season. Dario Dainelli, Giorgio Chiellini, Hidetoshi Nakata, Fabrizio Miccoli, Martin Jørgensen, goalkeeper Cristiano Lupatelli, Enzo Maresca, Tomáš Ujfaluši and Javier Portillo were among the highly rated players to sign up for Fiorentina, either permanently or on loan. With this squad, Fiorentina was expected to challenge for a place on the top half of the table, but slipped into the relegation battle that affected more than half of the Serie A clubs during the dramatic season. In the end, a strong finish to the season under incoming coach Dino Zoff saved La Viola from relegation, with an emotional 3–0 victory against Brescia confirming their survival.

== Players ==
=== Goalkeepers ===
- (Argentina) Sebastián Cejas
- (Italy) Marco Roccati
- (Italy) Cristiano Lupatelli
- (Italy) Francesco Palmieri

=== Defenders ===
- (Italy) Dario Dainelli
- (Italy) Giorgio Chiellini
- (Italy) Mirko Savini
- (Czech Republic) Tomáš Ujfaluši
- (Italy) Christian Maggio
- (Italy) Daniele Delli Carri
- (Italy) William Viali
- (Italy) Antonio Aquilanti

=== Midfielders ===
- (Nigeria) Christian Obodo
- (Spain) Luis Helguera
- (Italy) Angelo Di Livio
- (Italy) Luca Ariatti
- (Japan) Hidetoshi Nakata
- (Italy) Enzo Maresca
- (Denmark) Martin Jørgensen
- (Italy) Marco Donadel
- (Italy) Luigi Piangerelli
- (Italy) Gaetano Fontana

=== Forwards ===
- (Italy) Christian Riganò
- (Italy) Fabrizio Miccoli
- (Spain) Javier Portillo
- (Italy) Giampaolo Pazzini
- (Italy) Enrico Fantini
- (Bulgaria) Valeri Bojinov

== Competitions ==
=== Overall ===
Competition	Started round	Current position	Final position	First match	Last match
Serie A	Matchday 1	—	16th	12 September 2004	29 May 2005
Coppa Italia	Group stage	—	Quarter-finals	14 August 2004	16 March 2005

Last updated: 29 May 2005

=== Serie A ===
==== League table ====
Pos	Team	Pld	W	D	L	GF	GA	GD	Pts	Qualification or relegation
14	Siena	38	9	16	13	44	55	−11	43	
15	Chievo	38	11	10	17	32	49	−17	43	
16	Fiorentina	38	9	15	14	42	50	−8	42	
17	Parma	38	10	12	16	48	65	−17	42	Relegation tie-breaker
18	Bologna (R)	38	9	15	14	33	36	−3	42	Serie B after tie-breaker

Source: 2004–05 Serie A, RSSSF.com, Soccerway
Rules for classification: 1) Points; 2) Head-to-head points; 3) Head-to-head goal difference; 4) Goal difference; 5) Goals scored; 6) Draw. (Note: Head-to-head record is used only after all the matches between the teams in question have been played).
(R) Relegated

==== Results summary ====
Overall								Home						Away					
Pld	W	D	L	GF	GA	GD	Pts	W	D	L	GF	GA	GD	W	D	L	GF	GA	GD
38	9	15	14	42	50	−8	42	7	7	5	29	22	+7	2	8	9	13	28	−15

Last updated: 29 May 2005.
Source: Competitive matches

==== Results by round ====
Round	1	2	3	4	5	6	7	8	9	10	11	12	13	14	15	16	17	18	19	20	21	22	23	24	25	26	27	28	29	30	31	32	33	34	35	36	37	38
Ground	A	H	A	H	A	H	A	A	H	H	A	H	A	H	A	H	A	H	A	H	A	H	A	H	A	H	H	A	A	H	A	H	A	H	A	H	A	H
Result	L	W	D	L	D	D	D	W	W	D	L	D	D	W	L	W	L	L	D	L	L	L	L	W	L	D	W	D	L	D	L	D	D	L	W	D	D	W
Position	17	11	13	14	15	14	14	10	6	7	10	11	12	8	12	8	9	13	12	15	16	16	16	16	16	16	15	15	15	16	18	18	17	19	17	18	19	16

Updated to match(es) played on 29 May 2005. Source: Competitive matches
A = Away; H = Home; W = Win; D = Draw; L = Loss

==== Matches ====
12 September 2004 1	Roma	1–0	Fiorentina	Rome
15:00 CEST (UTC+02:00)	Montella 53'	Report		Stadium: Stadio Olimpico; Attendance: 57,724; Referee: Paolo Dondarini

19 September 2004 2	Fiorentina	2–1	Cagliari	Florence
15:00 CEST (UTC+02:00)	Miccoli 16'; Dainelli 90+1'	Report	Suazo 90+3'	Stadium: Stadio Artemio Franchi; Attendance: 33,361; Referee: Salvatore Racalbuto

22 September 2004 3	Palermo	0–0	Fiorentina	Palermo
20:30 CEST (UTC+02:00)		Report		Stadium: Stadio Renzo Barbera; Attendance: 32,642; Referee: Stefano Farina

26 September 2004 4	Fiorentina	0–2	Sampdoria	Florence
15:00 CEST (UTC+02:00)		Report	Bazzani 11'; Sacchetti 64'	Stadium: Stadio Artemio Franchi; Attendance: 31,890; Referee: Diego Preschern

3 October 2004 5	Parma	0–0	Fiorentina	Parma
15:00 CEST (UTC+02:00)		Report		Stadium: Stadio Ennio Tardini; Attendance: 13,653; Referee: Daniele Tombolini

17 October 2004 6	Fiorentina	0–0	Siena	Florence
15:00 CEST (UTC+02:00)		Report		Stadium: Stadio Artemio Franchi; Attendance: 34,119; Referee: Roberto Rosetti

24 October 2004 7	Udinese	2–2	Fiorentina	Udine
15:00 CEST (UTC+02:00)	Mauri 17'; Sensini 51'	Report	Miccoli 15', 66'	Stadium: Stadio Friuli; Attendance: 14,233; Referee: Salvatore Racalbuto

27 October 2004 8	Reggina	1–2	Fiorentina	Reggio Calabria
20:30 CEST (UTC+02:00)	Paredes 59'	Report	Maresca 72'; Miccoli 88'	Stadium: Stadio Oreste Granillo; Attendance: 15,279; Referee: Daniele Tombolini

31 October 2004 9	Fiorentina	4–0	Lecce	Florence
15:00 CET (UTC+01:00)	Jørgensen 45+3'; Obodo 62', 71'; Chiellini 90'	Report		Stadium: Stadio Artemio Franchi; Attendance: 30,478; Referee: Emidio Morganti

7 November 2004 10	Fiorentina	1–1	Internazionale	Florence
15:00 CET (UTC+01:00)	Dainelli 26'	Report	Adriano 81'	Stadium: Stadio Artemio Franchi; Attendance: 43,708; Referee: Massimo De Santis

10 November 2004 11	Juventus	1–0	Fiorentina	Turin
20:30 CET (UTC+01:00)	Olivera 72'	Report		Stadium: Stadio delle Alpi; Attendance: 22,983; Referee: Stefano Farina

14 November 2004 12	Fiorentina	1–1	Livorno	Florence
15:00 CET (UTC+01:00)	Riganò 71'	Report	C. Lucarelli 77'	Stadium: Stadio Artemio Franchi; Attendance: 33,143; Referee: Matteo Trefoloni

28 November 2004 13	Messina	1–1	Fiorentina	Messina
15:00 CET (UTC+01:00)	Parisi 69' (pen.)	Report	Ariatti 54'	Stadium: Stadio San Filippo; Attendance: 26,088; Referee: Gianluca Paparesta

5 December 2004 14	Fiorentina	1–0	Bologna	Florence
15:00 CET (UTC+01:00)	Riganò 63'	Report		Stadium: Stadio Artemio Franchi; Attendance: 28,130; Referee: Massimo De Santis

12 December 2004 15	Milan	6–0	Fiorentina	Milan
15:00 CET (UTC+01:00)	Seedorf 16', 82'; Chiellini 22' (o.g.); Shevchenko 52', 73'; Crespo 61'	Report		Stadium: San Siro; Attendance: 69,226; Referee: Pasquale Rodomonti

19 December 2004 16	Fiorentina	2–0	Chievo	Florence
15:00 CET (UTC+01:00)	Riganò 45'; Portillo 70'	Report		Stadium: Stadio Artemio Franchi; Attendance: 27,133; Referee: Nicola Rizzoli

6 January 2005 17	Atalanta	1–0	Fiorentina	Bergamo
15:00 CET (UTC+01:00)	Budan 81'	Report		Stadium: Stadio Atleti Azzurri d'Italia; Attendance: 13,388; Referee: Stefano Cassarà

9 January 2005 18	Fiorentina	2–3	Lazio	Florence
15:00 CET (UTC+01:00)	Miccoli 21', 85'	Report	Di Canio 33'; Pandev 64'; Dabo 82'	Stadium: Stadio Artemio Franchi; Attendance: 30,142; Referee: Nicola Rizzoli

15 January 2005 19	Brescia	1–1	Fiorentina	Brescia
18:00 CET (UTC+01:00)	Di Pasquale 62'	Report	Miccoli 49'	Stadium: Stadio Mario Rigamonti; Attendance: 6,705; Referee: Pierluigi Collina

23 January 2005 20	Fiorentina	1–2	Roma	Florence
20:30 CET (UTC+01:00)	Maresca 20'	Report	Cassano 23'; Montella 67'	Stadium: Stadio Artemio Franchi; Attendance: 33,788; Referee: Nicola Ayroldi

30 January 2005 21	Cagliari	1–0	Fiorentina	Cagliari
15:00 CET (UTC+01:00)	Esposito 11'	Report		Stadium: Stadio Sant'Elia; Referee: Emidio Morganti

2 February 2005 22	Fiorentina	1–2	Palermo	Florence
20:30 CET (UTC+01:00)	Miccoli 71'	Report	Lupatelli 57' (o.g.); González 69'	Stadium: Stadio Artemio Franchi; Attendance: 29,222; Referee: Mauro Bergonzi

5 February 2005 23	Sampdoria	3–0	Fiorentina	Genoa
18:00 CET (UTC+01:00)	Flachi 15'; Tonetto 33'; Diana 74'	Report		Stadium: Stadio Luigi Ferraris; Attendance: 22,108; Referee: Paolo Dondarini

13 February 2005 24	Fiorentina	2–1	Parma	Florence
15:00 CET (UTC+01:00)	Chiellini 47'; Miccoli 81'	Report	Gilardino 85'	Stadium: Stadio Artemio Franchi; Attendance: 29,490; Referee: Gianluca Paparesta

20 February 2005 25	Siena	1–0	Fiorentina	Siena
15:00 CET (UTC+01:00)	Flo 5'	Report		Stadium: Stadio Artemio Franchi – Montepaschi Arena; Attendance: 13,166; Referee: Salvatore Racalbuto

26 February 2005 26	Fiorentina	2–2	Udinese	Florence
20:30 CET (UTC+01:00)	Bojinov 22'; Ariatti 34'	Report	Muntari 41'; Di Natale 56'	Stadium: Stadio Artemio Franchi; Attendance: 28,056; Referee: Matteo Trefoloni

6 March 2005 27	Fiorentina	2–1	Reggina	Florence
15:00 CET (UTC+01:00)	Pazzini 48'; Miccoli 68' (pen.)	Report	Colucci 78'	Stadium: Stadio Artemio Franchi; Attendance: 29,755; Referee: Emidio Morganti

12 March 2005 28	Lecce	2–2	Fiorentina	Lecce
18:00 CET (UTC+01:00)	Dalla Bona 28'; Vučinić 30'	Report	Jørgensen 47'; Maggio 86'	Stadium: Stadio Via del Mare; Attendance: 14,729; Referee: Marco Gabriele

20 March 2005 29	Internazionale	3–2	Fiorentina	Milan
15:00 CET (UTC+01:00)	Cambiasso 27'; Verón 53'; Córdoba 65'	Report	Pazzini 41'; Córdoba 87' (o.g.)	Stadium: San Siro; Attendance: 57,157; Referee: Paolo Bertini

9 April 2005 30	Fiorentina	3–3	Juventus	Florence
20:30 CEST (UTC+02:00)	Pazzini 14'; Chiellini 36'; Dainelli 75'	Report	Del Piero 22'; Ibrahimović 59', 82'	Stadium: Stadio Artemio Franchi; Attendance: 45,614; Referee: Pierluigi Collina

17 April 2005 31	Livorno	2–0	Fiorentina	Livorno
15:00 CEST (UTC+02:00)	C. Lucarelli 12' (pen.), 42'	Report		Stadium: Stadio Armando Picchi; Attendance: 17,552; Referee: Paolo Bertini

20 April 2005 32	Fiorentina	1–1	Messina	Florence
20:30 CEST (UTC+02:00)	Dainelli 60'	Report	Di Napoli 90+5'	Stadium: Stadio Artemio Franchi; Attendance: 27,704; Referee: Danilo Nucini

24 April 2005 33	Bologna	0–0	Fiorentina	Bologna
15:00 CEST (UTC+02:00)		Report		Stadium: Stadio Renato Dall'Ara; Attendance: 15,430; Referee: Paolo Bertini

30 April 2005 34	Fiorentina	1–2	Milan	Florence
20:30 CEST (UTC+02:00)	Maresca 25'	Report	Shevchenko 46', 55'	Stadium: Stadio Artemio Franchi; Attendance: 45,909; Referee: Massimo De Santis

8 May 2005 35	Chievo	1–2	Fiorentina	Verona
15:00 CEST (UTC+02:00)	Mandelli 86'	Report	Miccoli 43'; Bojinov 79'	Stadium: Stadio Marc'Antonio Bentegodi; Attendance: 20,236; Referee: Paolo Dondarini

15 May 2005 36	Fiorentina	0–0	Atalanta	Florence
15:00 CEST (UTC+02:00)		Report		Stadium: Stadio Artemio Franchi; Attendance: 43,384; Referee: Pasquale Rodomonti

22 May 2005 37	Lazio	1–1	Fiorentina	Rome
15:00 CEST (UTC+02:00)	Siviglia 18'	Report	Maresca 2'	Stadium: Stadio Olimpico; Attendance: 45,221; Referee: Roberto Rosetti

29 May 2005 38	Fiorentina	3–0	Brescia	Florence
15:00 CEST (UTC+02:00)	Miccoli 43' (pen.); Jørgensen 59'; Riganò 66'	Report		Stadium: Stadio Artemio Franchi; Attendance: 44,808; Referee: Pierluigi Collina

== Statistics ==
=== Appearances and goals ===
No.	Pos	Nat	Player	Total		Serie A		Coppa Italia	
No.	Pos	Nat	Player	Apps	Goals	Apps	Goals	Apps	Goals
Goalkeepers
Defenders
Midfielders
Forwards
Players transferred out during the season

Source: Competitions

=== Goalscorers ===
Rank	No.	Pos	Nat	Name	Serie A	Coppa Italia	Total
Own goal					0	0	0
Totals					0	0	0

Last updated:

=== Clean sheets ===
Rank	No.	Pos	Nat	Name	Serie A	Coppa Italia	Total
Totals					0	0	0

Last updated:

=== Disciplinary record ===
No.	Pos	Nat	Player	Serie A			Coppa Italia			Total		
No.	Pos	Nat	Player	Booked	(yellow card) (yellow-red card)	Sent off (straight red)	Booked	(yellow card) (yellow-red card)	Sent off (straight red)	Booked	(yellow card) (yellow-red card)	Sent off (straight red)
Totals				0	0	0	0	0	0	0	0	0

Last updated:
