= 2006–07 Atalanta BC season =

Atalanta
2006–07 season
- President: Ivan Ruggeri
- Head coach: Stefano Colantuono
- Stadium: Stadio Atleti Azzurri d'Italia
- Serie A: 8th
- Coppa Italia: Third Round
- Top goalscorer: League: Cristiano Doni (13); All: Cristiano Doni (13)
- Average home league attendance: 11,601
Home colours	Away colours

The 2006–07 season was the 100th season in the history of Atalanta BC and the club's first season back in the top flight of Italian football. In addition to the domestic league, Atalanta participated in this season's edition of the Coppa Italia.

== Competitions ==
=== Overview ===
Competition	First match	Last match	Starting round	Final position	Record							
Competition	First match	Last match	Starting round	Final position	Pld	W	D	L	GF	GA	GD	Win %
Serie A	10 September 2006	27 May 2007	Matchday 1	8th	38	12	14	12	56	54	+2	31.58
Coppa Italia	19 August 2006	27 August 2006	First round	Third round	3	2	0	1	8	3	+5	66.67
Total					41	14	14	13	64	57	+7	34.15

Source: Competitions

=== Serie A ===
==== League table ====
Pos	Team	Pld	W	D	L	GF	GA	GD	Pts	Qualification or relegation
6	Fiorentina (Note: Fiorentina were docked 15 points, Reggina 11 points, Milan 8 points and Lazio 3 points, all for involvement in the 2006 Italian football scandal.)	38	21	10	7	62	31	+31	58	Qualification to UEFA Cup first round
7	Empoli	38	14	12	12	42	43	−1	54	Qualification to UEFA Cup first round
8	Atalanta	38	12	14	12	56	54	+2	50	
9	Sampdoria	38	13	10	15	44	48	−4	49	Qualification to Intertoto Cup third round (Note: Sampdoria gained entry to the 2007 UEFA Intertoto Cup after Atalanta renounced. Sampdoria then qualified for the 2007–08 UEFA Cup first round.)
10	Udinese	38	12	10	16	49	55	−6	46	

Source: "Serie A 2006/2007 - 38. Round". worldfootball.net. 21 July 2025.
Rules for classification: 1) points; 2) goal difference; 3) number of goals scored.

==== Results summary ====
Overall								Home						Away					
Pld	W	D	L	GF	GA	GD	Pts	W	D	L	GF	GA	GD	W	D	L	GF	GA	GD
38	12	14	12	56	54	+2	50	8	9	2	34	22	+12	4	5	10	22	32	−10

Source: Serie A

==== Results by round ====
Round	1	2	3	4	5	6	7	8	9	10	11	12	13	14	15	16	17	18	19	20	21	22	23	24	25	26	27	28	29	30	31	32	33	34	35	36	37	38
Ground	H	A	H	A	H	A	H	H	A	H	A	A	H	A	H	A	H	A	H	A	H	H	A	H	A	A	H	A	H	H	A	A	H	A	H	A	H	A
Result	W	D	D	L	D	W	W	D	L	W	L	D	L	L	W	D	L	L	W	W	D	D	D	D	L	L	D	L	D	W	W	L	W	D	W	W	D	L
Position	1	3	5	8	10	7	5	5	6	5	5	5	8	8	6	6	9	11	7	7	8	9	9	9	9	10	11	10	10	11	10	9	9	9	8	8	8	8

Source: Serie A
A = Away; H = Home; W = Win; D = Draw; L = Loss

==== Matches ====
10 September 2006 1	Atalanta	3–1	Ascoli	Bergamo
15:00 CEST (UTC+02:00)	Zampagna 31'; Ventola 36', 43'		Bjelanović 60'	Stadium: Stadio Atleti Azzurri d'Italia; Attendance: 11,039; Referee: Mauro Bergonzi

17 September 2006 2	Catania	0–0	Atalanta	Catania
15:00 CEST (UTC+02:00)				Stadium: Stadio Angelo Massimino; Attendance: 18,400; Referee: Luca Palanca

20 September 2006 3	Atalanta	0–0	Empoli	Bergamo
20:30 CEST (UTC+02:00)				Stadium: Stadio Atleti Azzurri d'Italia; Attendance: 11,069; Referee: Giorgio Lops

24 September 2006 4	Lazio	1–0	Atalanta	Rome
15:00 CEST (UTC+02:00)	Siviglia 69'			Stadium: Stadio Olimpico; Attendance: 24,800; Referee: Oscar Girardi

30 September 2006 5	Atalanta	1–1	Reggina	Bergamo
18:00 CEST (UTC+02:00)	Loria 3'		Gia. Tedesco 6'	Stadium: Stadio Atleti Azzurri d'Italia; Attendance: 13,000; Referee: Oberdan Pantana

15 October 2006 6	Palermo	2–3	Atalanta	Palermo
15:00 CEST (UTC+02:00)	Bresciano 18'; Corini 45' (pen.)		Doni 13'; Rivalta 31'; Tissone 55'	Stadium: Stadio Renzo Barbera; Attendance: 26,200; Referee: Luca Banti

22 October 2006 7	Atalanta	3–2	Sampdoria	Bergamo
15:00 CEST (UTC+02:00)	Doni 38' (pen.), 85' (pen.); Zampagna 89'		Quagliarella 4', 11'	Stadium: Stadio Atleti Azzurri d'Italia; Attendance: 9,500; Referee: Andrea Romeo

25 October 2006 8	Atalanta	3–3	Cagliari	Bergamo
20:30 CEST (UTC+02:00)	Loria 4'; Ventola 58'; Doni 69'		Bianco 6'; D'Agostino 30'; Suazo 53' (pen.)	Stadium: Stadio Atleti Azzurri d'Italia; Attendance: 13,000; Referee: Nicola Stefanini

29 October 2006 9	Parma	3–1	Atalanta	Parma
18:00 CET (UTC+01:00)	Budan 1'; Grella 70' (pen.); Muslimović 87'		Doni 58'	Stadium: Stadio Ennio Tardini; Attendance: 13,691; Referee: Roland Herberg

5 November 2006 10	Atalanta	2–0	Milan	Bergamo
20:30 CET (UTC+01:00)	Ventola 50'; Soncin 90+2'			Stadium: Stadio Atleti Azzurri d'Italia; Attendance: 8,500; Referee: Tiziano Pieri

11 November 2006 11	Fiorentina	3–1	Atalanta	Florence
18:00 CET (UTC+01:00)	Mutu 26'; Pazzini 89', 90+4'		Migliaccio 25'	Stadium: Stadio Artemio Franchi; Attendance: 30,000; Referee: Andrea De Marco

19 November 2006 12	Chievo	2–2	Atalanta	Verona
15:00 CET (UTC+01:00)	Zanchetta 25'; Pellissier 57'		Zampagna 71'; Loria 75'	Stadium: Stadio Marcantonio Bentegodi; Attendance: 6,800; Referee: Nicola Stefanini

26 November 2006 13	Atalanta	1–2	Torino	Bergamo
15:00 CET (UTC+01:00)	Loria 90+5'		Rivalta 78' (pen.); Rosina 88'	Stadium: Stadio Atleti Azzurri d'Italia; Attendance: 18,500; Referee: Paolo Dondarini

2 December 2006 14	Roma	2–1	Atalanta	Rome
20:30 CET (UTC+01:00)	Totti 50' (pen.), 64' (pen.)		Zampagna 19'	Stadium: Stadio Olimpico; Attendance: 34,800; Referee: Oberdan Pantana

10 December 2006 15	Atalanta	3–2	Messina	Bergamo
15:00 CET (UTC+01:00)	Bombardini 28'; Ferreira Pinto 57'; Doni 67'		Córdova 76'; Di Napoli 85'	Stadium: Stadio Atleti Azzurri d'Italia; Attendance: 10,400; Referee: Stefano Farina

17 December 2006 16	Siena	1–1	Atalanta	Siena
15:00 CET (UTC+01:00)	Frick 85'		Migliaccio 36'	Stadium: Montepaschi Arena; Attendance: 9,500; Referee: Daniele Orsato

20 December 2006 17	Atalanta	1–2	Udinese	Bergamo
20:30 CET (UTC+01:00)	Tissone 46'		De Martino 52'; Di Natale 90+5'	Stadium: Stadio Atleti Azzurri d'Italia; Attendance: 10,481; Referee: Nicola Pierpaoli

23 December 2006 18	Internazionale	2–1	Atalanta	Milan
15:00 CET (UTC+01:00)	Adriano 65'; Loria 75' (o.g.)		Doni 16'	Stadium: San Siro; Attendance: 35,000; Referee: Paolo Bertini

14 January 2007 19	Atalanta	5–1	Livorno	Bergamo
15:00 CET (UTC+01:00)	Doni 38', 45'; Donati 57'; Ariatti 66'; Ventola 90+4'		Pfertzel 53'	Stadium: Stadio Atleti Azzurri d'Italia; Attendance: 10,500; Referee: Luca Marelli

20 January 2007 20	Ascoli	1–3	Atalanta	Ascoli Piceno
18:00 CET (UTC+01:00)	Paolucci 72'		Zampagna 51'; Adriano Pereira 84'; Doni 86'	Stadium: Stadio Cino e Lillo Del Duca; Attendance: 8,000; Referee: Stefano Farina

28 January 2007 21	Atalanta	1–1	Catania	Bergamo
15:00 CET (UTC+01:00)	Zampagna 30'		Morimoto 88'	Stadium: Stadio Atleti Azzurri d'Italia; Attendance: 10,200; Referee: Andrea Romeo

11 February 2007 23	Atalanta	0–0	Lazio	Bergamo
15:00 CET (UTC+01:00)				Stadium: Stadio Atleti Azzurri d'Italia; Attendance: 0 Referee: Emidio Morganti

18 February 2007 24	Reggina	1–1	Atalanta	Reggio Emilia
15:00 CET (UTC+01:00)	Amoruso 64'		Lanzaro 75' (o.g.)	Stadium: Stadio Oreste Granillo; Attendance: 13,700; Referee: Mauro Bergonzi

24 February 2007 25	Atalanta	1–1	Palermo	Bergamo
20:30 CET (UTC+01:00)	Zampagna 13'		Diana 58'	Stadium: Stadio Atleti Azzurri d'Italia; Attendance: 8,800; Referee: Rosetti

28 February 2007 26	Sampdoria	2–1	Atalanta	Genoa
15:00 CET (UTC+01:00)	Bazzani 71'; Volpi 83' (pen.)		Ventola 8'	Stadium: Stadio Luigi Ferraris; Attendance: 4,100; Referee: Orsato

4 March 2007 27	Cagliari	2–0	Atalanta	Cagliari
15:00 CET (UTC+01:00)	Suazo 4'; Pepe 71'			Stadium: Stadio Sant'Elia; Attendance: 8,500; Referee: Luca Palanca

11 March 2007 28	Atalanta	1–1	Parma	Bergamo
15:00 CET (UTC+01:00)	Defendi 54'		Coly 88'	Stadium: Stadio Atleti Azzurri d'Italia; Attendance: 10,200; Referee: Antonio Giannoccaro

18 March 2007 29	Milan	1–0	Atalanta	Milan
15:00 CET (UTC+01:00)	Ambrosini 40'			Stadium: San Siro; Attendance: 45,490; Referee: Massimiliano Saccani

1 April 2007 30	Atalanta	2–2	Fiorentina	Bergamo
15:00 CEST (UTC+02:00)	Loria 39'; Doni 66' (pen.)		Reginaldo 27'; Pazzini 32' (pen.)	Stadium: Stadio Atleti Azzurri d'Italia; Attendance: 13,400; Referee: Roberto Rosetti

7 April 2007 31	Atalanta	1–0	Chievo	Bergamo
15:00 CEST (UTC+02:00)	Doni 54' (pen.)			Stadium: Stadio Atleti Azzurri d'Italia; Attendance: 9,800; Referee: Banti

15 April 2007 32	Torino	1–2	Atalanta	Turin
15:00 CEST (UTC+02:00)	Abbruscato 70'		Bellini 1'; Zampagna 8'	Stadium: Stadio Olimpico; Attendance: 21,700; Referee: Gabriele Gava

18 April 2007 22	Empoli	2–0	Atalanta	Empoli
15:00 CEST (UTC+02:00)	Saudati 35'; Almirón 53'			Stadium: Stadio Carlo Castellani; Attendance: 8,700; Referee: Roland Herberg

22 April 2007 33	Atalanta	2–1	Roma	Bergamo
15:00 CEST (UTC+02:00)	Doni 37'; Zampagna 44'		Perrotta 64'	Stadium: Stadio Atleti Azzurri d'Italia; Attendance: 14,300; Referee: Rosetti

29 April 2007 34	Messina	0–0	Atalanta	Messina
15:00 CEST (UTC+02:00)				Stadium: Stadio San Filippo; Attendance: 4,100; Referee: Nicola Stefanini

6 May 2007 35	Atalanta	3–1	Siena	Bergamo
15:00 CEST (UTC+02:00)	Ariatti 12'; Vieri 65'; Carrozzieri 90+1'		Vergassola 48' (pen.)	Stadium: Stadio Atleti Azzurri d'Italia; Attendance: 8,700; Referee: Gianluca Rocchi

13 May 2007 36	Udinese	2–3	Atalanta	Udine
15:00 CEST (UTC+02:00)	Gyan 28', 68'		Zampagna 45+6' (pen.); Tissone 73'; Vieri 85'	Stadium: Stadio Friuli; Attendance: 13,400; Referee: Nicola Pierpaoli

20 May 2007 37	Atalanta	1–1	Internazionale	Bergamo
15:00 CEST (UTC+02:00)	Ferreira Pinto 10'		Figo 48' (pen.)	Stadium: Stadio Atleti Azzurri d'Italia; Attendance: 15,200; Referee: Andrea Romeo

27 May 2007 38	Livorno	4–2	Atalanta	Livorno
15:00 CEST (UTC+02:00)	Lucarelli 45', 56' (pen.); Morrone 46'; Paulinho 83'		Zampagna 51'; Bombardini 65'	Stadium: Stadio Armando Picchi; Attendance: 15,200; Referee: Domenico Celi

=== Coppa Italia ===
19 August 2006 First round	Atalanta	3–0	Sassuolo	Bergamo
20:30 CEST (UTC+02:00)	Donati 4'; Zampagna 42'; Ventola 53' (pen.)			Stadium: Stadio Atleti Azzurri d'Italia; Attendance: 2,844; Referee: Christian Brighi

23 August 2006 Second round	Pescara	0–3	Atalanta	Pescara
20:30 CEST (UTC+02:00)			Zampagna 13', 32'; Ventola 70'	Stadium: Stadio Adriatico; Attendance: 2,500; Referee: Cristian Zanzi

27 August 2006 Third round	Triestina	3–2 (a.e.t.)	Atalanta	Trieste
20:30 CEST (UTC+02:00)	Kyriazīs 90+1'; Graffiedi 100'; Eliakwu 103'		Ventola 17'; Soncin 120'	Stadium: Stadio Nereo Rocco; Attendance: 5,443; Referee: Andrea Romeo

== Statistics ==
=== Appearances and goals ===
No.	Pos	Nat	Player	Total		Serie A		Coppa Italia	
No.	Pos	Nat	Player	Apps	Goals	Apps	Goals	Apps	Goals
Goalkeepers
1	GK	(Italy) ITA	Andrea Ferrari	0	0	0	0	0	0
18	GK	(Italy) ITA	Andrea Ivan	0	0	0	0	0	0
31	GK	(Italy) ITA	Alex Calderoni	0	0	0	0	0	0
Defenders
2	DF	(Argentina) ARG	Leonardo Talamonti	0	0	0	0	0	0
3	DF	(Brazil) BRA	Adriano	0	0	0	0	0	0
6	DF	(Italy) ITA	Gianpaolo Bellini	0	0	0	0	0	0
Midfielders
5	MF	(Italy) ITA	Massimo Donati	0	0	0	0	0	0
8	MF	(Italy) ITA	Antonino Bernardini	0	0	0	0	0	0
19	MF	(Italy) ITA	Luca Ariatti	0	0	0	0	0	0
72	FW	(Italy) ITA	Cristiano Doni	26	13	26	13	0	0
Forwards
7	FW	(Italy) ITA	Davide Bombardini	0	0	0	0	0	0
9	FW	(Italy) ITA	Riccardo Zampagna	0	0	0	0	0	0
10	FW	(Italy) ITA	Nicola Ventola	0	0	0	0	0	0

Source: Competitions
