= 2006–07 Serie A =

105th season of top-tier Italian football

Serie A
- Season: 2006–07
- Dates: 9 September 2006 – 26 May 2007
- Champions: Internazionale; 15th title
- Relegated: Chievo Verona; Ascoli; Messina
- Champions League: Internazionale; Roma; Lazio; Milan
- UEFA Cup: Palermo; Fiorentina; Empoli
- Intertoto Cup: Sampdoria
- Matches: 380
- Goals: 969 (2.55 per match)
- Top goalscorer: Francesco Totti (26 goals)
- Highest scoring: Roma 7–0 Catania
- Average attendance: 19,720

The 2006–07 Serie A (known as the Serie A TIM for sponsorship reasons) was the 105th season of top-tier Italian football, the 75th in a round-robin tournament. It was scheduled to begin on 26 and 27 August but was postponed to 2 September 2006 due to the Calciopoli scandal, which led to the absence of Juventus. On 22 April 2007, Internazionale became Serie A champions after defeating Siena, as Roma's loss to Atalanta left Inter with a 16-point advantage with five matches to play.

== Events ==
=== 2006 Italian football scandal ===
Following the Serie A scandal of 2006, Juventus was relegated to Serie B and deducted 9 points. Fiorentina, Milan and Lazio, were deducted 15, 8 and 3 points respectively but were not relegated. Consequently, Lecce, Messina and Treviso, originally slated for relegation to Serie B, were to remain in Serie A. However, Fiorentina and Lazio successfully appealed and escaped relegation, thus relegating Lecce and Treviso and keeping 20 teams in Serie A.

As part of another inquiry, Reggina were handed a 15-point penalty but were allowed to remain in Serie A. This penalty was reduced to 11 points on appeal.

=== League halting of February 2007 ===
On 2 February 2007, police officer Filippo Raciti was killed outside the Stadio Angelo Massimino, Catania, in football-related violence during the Sicilian derby between rivals Catania and Palermo. The match, originally scheduled for 4 February at 15:00, was exceptionally advanced on Friday at 18:00 under request of Catania because of the simultaneity with the St. Agatha local celebrations.

The dramatic Sicilian derby events, which followed the murder of Ermanno Licursi, an amateur club manager, beaten to death during a riot in a Terza Categoria league match, led Commissioner Luca Pancalli to call a stop to all football matches in Italy, including Serie A fixtures. Pancalli noted how the league fixtures would not start again until a solution to the violence issue in Italian football is found. The week after, a special law by the government enforced the measures to be taken against violence in football stadia and forbade the presence of supporters inside stadia which didn't agree with mandatory security dispositions, thus enabling Italian football to go on with half of the matches played without audience.

Following the events, Catania was prohibited to play its home matches at Stadio Angelo Massimino for the remaining part of the season, and the club was also forced to play its home matches in neutral grounds without spectators (a porte chiuse, behind closed doors). Several other Italian stadia were closed too because of security reasons, and reopened only once they would have passed several safety requirements. All stadiums were successfully reopened for April, with Stadio Massimino's exception. Catania's home matches were successively allowed to be attended by spectators, yet on neutral ground, as from 13 May.

=== Dominant Inter ===
With their victory over Siena on 22 April 2007, Internazionale captured the 2006–07 Serie A title (the 15th Scudetto in their club history) by moving 16 points clear of second-place Roma with five matches to play. Inter's dominant effort marked the defence of the title they were awarded in the wake of the Calciopoli scandal, and their first Scudetto claimed on the field since 28 May 1989. Clinching with five matches remaining, Inter tied the Serie A record for earliest title claim (along with Torino in the 1947–48 Serie A). The team also broke the record for most consecutive wins with a 17 match winning streak.

=== Relegation battle ===
With Messina and Ascoli already relegated, there was only one relegation slot left to be decided in the last matchday, with Parma (39 points), Chievo Verona (39), Catania (38), Siena (37) and Reggina (37) involved in the battle. The key match in the relegation battle was widely expected to be Catania–Chievo, to be played in Bologna because of the forced closure of Stadio Angelo Massimino by the Italian Football Federation (FIGC) following the February 2007 infamous riots in the Sicilian derby. The match ended in a 2–0 win for Catania; due to the contemporary wins of Parma, Siena and Reggina, Chievo were therefore relegated to Serie B.

== Team details ==
Locations of the 2006–07 Serie A teams

Team	City	Stadium	Capacity	Previous Season	Current
Atalanta	Bergamo	Stadio Atleti Azzurri d'Italia	25,640	Serie B Champions	Season
Cagliari	Cagliari	Stadio Sant'Elia	23,386	14th in Serie A	Season
Catania	Catania	Stadio Angelo Massimino	29,148	Serie B Runners-up	Season
Chievo Verona	Verona	Stadio Marcantonio Bentegodi	39,211	4th in Serie A	Season
Empoli	Empoli	Stadio Carlo Castellani	17,000	7th in Serie A	Season
Fiorentina	Florence	Stadio Artemio Franchi	47,246	9th in Serie A	Season
Internazionale	Milan	San Siro	82,955	Serie A Champions	Season
Lazio	Rome	Stadio Olimpico	80,500	16th in Serie A	Season
Livorno	Livorno	Stadio Armando Picchi	19,238	6th in Serie A	Season
Messina	Messina	Stadio San Filippo	40,200	17th in Serie A	Season
Milan	Milan	San Siro	82,955	3rd in Serie A	Season
Palermo	Palermo	Stadio Renzo Barbera	37,342	5th in Serie A	Season
Parma	Parma	Stadio Ennio Tardini	27,906	8th in Serie A	Season
Reggina	Reggio Calabria	Stadio Oreste Granillo	27,454	13th in Serie A	Season
Roma	Rome	Stadio Olimpico	80,500	2nd in Serie A	Season
Sampdoria	Genoa	Stadio Luigi Ferraris	37,091	12th in Serie A	Season
Siena	Siena	Stadio Artemio Franchi	15,373	15th in Serie A	Season
Torino	Turin	Stadio Olimpico di Torino	25,378	Serie B Playoff Winners	Season
Udinese	Udine	Stadio Friuli	41,315	11th in Serie A	Season

=== Personnel and sponsoring ===
Team	Head coach	Captain	Kit manufacturer	Shirt sponsor
Ascoli	(Italy) Nedo Sonetti	(Italy) Michele Fini	Legea	Pompea
Atalanta	(Italy) Stefano Colantuono	(Italy) Antonino Bernardini	Asics	Sit in Sport, Daihatsu
Cagliari	(Italy) Marco Giampaolo	(Honduras) David Suazo	Asics	Tiscali, Sky
Catania	(Italy) Pasquale Marino	(Italy) Armando Pantanelli	Legea	SP Energia Siciliana
Chievo Verona	(Italy) Luigi Delneri	(Italy) Lorenzo D'Anna	Lotto	Paluani/Banca Popolare di Verona/Ferroli/Cattolica Assicurazioni, Soglia Travel/Buon Viaggio Network
Empoli	(Italy) Luigi Cagni	(Italy) Ighli Vannucchi	Asics	Frutta, Computer Gross
Fiorentina	(Italy) Cesare Prandelli	(Italy) Dario Dainelli	Lotto	Toyota
Internazionale	(Italy) Roberto Mancini	(Argentina) Javier Zanetti	Nike	Pirelli
Lazio	(Italy) Delio Rossi	(Italy) Luciano Zauri	Puma	INA Assitalia, Festa del Cinema di Roma
Livorno	(Italy) Fernando Orsi	(Italy) Cristiano Lucarelli	Legea	Banca Carige, Mediaset Premium
Milan	(Italy) Carlo Ancelotti	(Italy) Paolo Maldini	Adidas	Bwin
Messina	(Italy) Bruno Bolchi	(Italy) Christian Riganò	Legea	Castello Sicily Abbigliamento/Legea/Framon Hotel Group/Hermes Media/Sporteconomy.it/Chevrolet Roberto Capitelli/Radio Margherita/Mazda Napoli/Sponsoring Group, Air Malta
Palermo	(Italy) Francesco Guidolin	(Italy) Eugenio Corini	Lotto	Mandi
Parma	(Italy) Claudio Ranieri	(Italy) Giuseppe Cardone	Erreà	Gimoka/Play Radio (in UEFA matches), Play Radio
Reggina	(Italy) Walter Mazzarri	(Italy) Alessandro Lucarelli	Onze	Gicos, Regione Calabria
Roma	(Italy) Luciano Spalletti	(Italy) Francesco Totti	Diadora	Festa del Cinema di Roma/Pepsi Collection
Sampdoria	(Italy) Walter Novellino	(Italy) Sergio Volpi	Kappa	Erg Diesel One
Siena	(Italy) Mario Beretta	(Italy) Enrico Chiesa	Mass	Banca Monte dei Paschi di Siena
Torino	(Italy) Gianni De Biasi	(Italy) Diego De Ascentis	Asics	Reale Mutua, Fratelli Beretta
Udinese	(Italy) Alberto Malesani	(Italy) Giampiero Pinzi	Lotto	Gaudì Jeans

== League table ==
Pos	Team	Pld	W	D	L	GF	GA	GD	Pts	Qualification or relegation
1	Internazionale (C)	38	30	7	1	80	34	+46	97	Qualification to Champions League group stage (Note: Milan qualified for 2007–08 UEFA Champions League group stage instead of third qualifying round as the title holders.)
2	Roma	38	22	9	7	74	34	+40	75	Qualification to Champions League group stage
3	Lazio (Note: Fiorentina were docked 15 points, Reggina 11 points, Milan 8 points and Lazio 3 points, all for involvement in the 2006 Italian football scandal.)	38	18	11	9	59	33	+26	62	Qualification to Champions League third qualifying round
4	Milan	38	19	12	7	57	36	+21	61	Qualification to Champions League group stage
5	Palermo	38	16	10	12	58	51	+7	58	Qualification to UEFA Cup first round
6	Fiorentina	38	21	10	7	62	31	+31	58	Qualification to UEFA Cup first round
7	Empoli	38	14	12	12	42	43	−1	54	Qualification to UEFA Cup first round
8	Atalanta	38	12	14	12	56	54	+2	50	
9	Sampdoria	38	13	10	15	44	48	−4	49	Qualification to Intertoto Cup third round (Note: Sampdoria gained entry to the 2007 UEFA Intertoto Cup after Atalanta renounced. Sampdoria then qualified for the 2007–08 UEFA Cup first round.)
10	Udinese	38	12	10	16	49	55	−6	46	
11	Livorno	38	10	13	15	41	54	−13	43	
12	Parma	38	10	12	16	41	56	−15	42	
13	Catania	38	10	11	17	46	68	−22	41	
14	Reggina	38	12	15	11	52	50	+2	40	
15	Siena (Note: Siena were given a one-point deduction for a delay in payment of social security contributions.)	38	9	14	15	35	45	−10	40	
16	Torino	38	10	10	18	27	47	−20	40	
17	Cagliari	38	9	13	16	35	46	−11	40	
18	Chievo (R)	38	9	12	17	38	48	−10	39	Relegation to Serie B
19	Ascoli (R)	38	5	12	21	36	67	−31	27	Relegation to Serie B
20	Messina (R)	38	5	11	22	37	69	−32	26	Relegation to Serie B

Source: "Serie A 2006/2007 - 38. Round". worldfootball.net. 21 July 2025.
Rules for classification: 1) points; 2) goal difference; 3) number of goals scored.
(C) Champions; (R) Relegated

== Top goalscorers ==
Rank	Player	Club	Goals
1	(Italy) Francesco Totti	Roma	26
2	(Italy) Cristiano Lucarelli	Livorno	20
3	(Italy) Christian Riganò	Messina	19
4	(Italy) Rolando Bianchi	Reggina	18
5	(Italy) Nicola Amoruso	Reggina	17
5	(Italy) Gionatha Spinesi	Catania	17
7	(Romania) Adrian Mutu	Fiorentina	16
7	(Italy) Tommaso Rocchi	Lazio	16
7	(Italy) Luca Toni	Fiorentina	16
10	(Sweden) Zlatan Ibrahimović	Internazionale	15

== Results ==
Home \ Away	ASC	ATA	CAG	CTN	CHV	EMP	FIO	INT	LAZ	LIV	MES	MIL	PAL	PAR	REG	ROM	SAM	SIE	TOR	UDI
Ascoli		1–3	2–1	2–2	3–0	0–1	1–1	1–2	2–2	0–2	1–1	2–5	3–2	0–0	2–3	1–1	1–1	0–1	0–2	2–2
Atalanta	3–1		3–3	1–1	1–0	0–0	2–2	1–1	0–0	5–1	3–2	2–0	1–1	1–1	1–1	2–1	3–2	3–1	1–2	1–2
Cagliari	1–0	2–0		0–1	0–2	0–0	0–2	1–1	0–2	2–2	2–0	2–2	1–0	0–0	0–2	3–2	1–0	2–2	0–0	2–1
Catania	3–3	0–0	0–1		2–0	2–1	0–1	2–5	3–1	3–2	2–2	1–1	1–2	2–0	1–4	0–2	4–2	1–1	1–1	1–0
Chievo	1–0	2–2	0–0	2–1		0–0	0–1	0–2	0–1	2–1	1–1	0–1	0–1	1–0	3–2	2–2	1–1	1–2	3–0	2–0
Empoli	4–1	2–0	1–0	2–1	1–1		1–2	0–3	1–1	2–2	3–1	0–0	2–0	2–0	3–3	1–0	2–0	1–0	0–0	1–1
Fiorentina	4–0	3–1	1–0	3–0	1–0	2–0		2–3	1–0	2–1	4–0	2–2	2–3	1–0	3–0	0–0	5–1	1–0	5–1	2–0
Internazionale	2–0	2–1	1–0	2–1	4–3	3–1	3–1		4–3	4–1	2–0	2–1	2–2	2–0	1–0	1–3	1–1	2–0	3–0	1–1
Lazio	3–1	1–0	0–0	3–1	0–0	3–1	0–1	0–2		1–0	1–0	0–0	1–2	0–0	0–0	3–0	1–0	1–1	2–0	5–0
Livorno	0–0	4–2	2–1	4–1	0–2	0–0	1–0	1–2	1–1		2–1	0–0	1–2	3–0	1–1	1–1	1–0	0–0	1–1	1–0
Messina	1–2	0–0	2–2	1–1	2–1	2–2	2–2	0–1	1–4	0–1		1–3	2–0	1–1	2–0	1–1	0–2	1–0	0–3	1–0
Milan	1–0	1–0	3–1	3–0	3–1	3–1	0–0	3–4	2–1	2–1	1–0		0–2	1–0	3–1	1–2	1–0	0–0	0–0	2–3
Palermo	4–0	2–3	1–3	5–3	1–1	0–1	1–1	1–2	0–3	3–0	2–1	0–0		3–4	4–3	1–2	2–0	2–1	3–0	2–0
Parma	1–0	3–1	2–1	1–1	2–2	3–1	2–0	1–2	1–3	1–0	4–1	0–2	0–0		2–2	0–4	0–1	1–0	1–0	0–3
Reggina	2–1	1–1	2–1	0–1	1–1	4–1	1–1	0–0	2–3	2–2	3–1	2–0	0–0	3–2		1–0	0–1	0–1	1–1	1–1
Roma	2–2	2–1	2–0	7–0	1–1	1–0	3–1	0–1	0–0	2–0	4–3	1–1	4–0	3–0	3–0		4–0	1–0	0–1	3–1
Sampdoria	2–0	2–1	1–1	1–0	3–0	1–2	0–0	0–2	2–0	4–1	3–1	1–1	1–1	3–2	0–0	2–4		0–0	1–0	3–3
Siena	0–1	1–1	0–0	1–1	2–1	2–0	1–1	1–2	2–1	0–0	3–1	3–4	1–1	2–2	0–1	1–3	0–2		1–0	2–2
Torino	1–0	1–2	1–0	1–0	1–0	1–0	0–1	1–3	0–4	0–0	1–1	0–1	0–0	1–1	1–2	1–2	1–0	1–2		2–3
Udinese	0–0	2–3	3–1	0–1	2–1	0–1	1–0	0–0	2–4	4–0	1–0	0–3	1–2	3–3	1–1	0–1	1–0	3–0	2–0	

Source: lega-calcio.it (in Italian)
Legend: Blue = home team win; Yellow = draw; Red = away team win.

== Awards ==
=== Individual ===
The official Serie A individual awards for the 2006–07 season were presented by the Italian Footballers' Association (AIC) at the annual Oscar del Calcio ceremony:

2007 AIC Oscar del Calcio Winners
Category	Winner	Club / Association
Footballer of the Year	(Brazil) Kaká (Milan)	
Italian Footballer	(Italy) Francesco Totti (Roma)	
Tactical Positions	(Italy) Marco Materazzi (Defender of the Year / Inter Milan)	(Italy) Angelo Peruzzi (Goalkeeper of the Year / Lazio)
Foreign & Youth	(Brazil) Kaká (Foreign Footballer / Milan)	(Italy) Riccardo Montolivo (Young Footballer / Fiorentina)
Staff & Officials	(Italy) Cesare Prandelli (Coach of the Year / Fiorentina)	Roberto Rosetti (Referee of the Year)

Team of the Year
Goalkeeper	(France) Sébastien Frey (Fiorentina)		
Defenders	(Brazil) Maicon (Inter Milan)	(Italy) Marco Materazzi (Inter Milan)	(Romania) Cristian Chivu (Roma)
Midfielders	(Italy) Daniele De Rossi (Roma)	(Italy) Andrea Pirlo (Milan)	(Italy) Gennaro Gattuso (Milan)
Forwards	(Brazil) Kaká (Milan)	(Italy) Francesco Totti (Roma)	(Sweden) Zlatan Ibrahimović (Inter Milan)

== Attendances ==
Serie A attendances have dropped marginally. Higher attendances in the last couple of weeks increased the final season average for Serie A to 19,720. These are the average Serie A team attendances for the 2006–07 season:

Club	Average Attendance	Highest Attendance	Game
Ascoli	7,209	15,000	vs Milan
Atalanta	12,246	24,000	vs Milan
Cagliari	11,479	20.200	vs Milan
Catania	16,185	20,000	vs Palermo
Chievo Verona	6,719	13,000	vs Ascoli
Empoli	5,351	12,000	vs. Fiorentina
Fiorentina	30,000	41,000	vs. Milan
Internazionale	48,000	64,000	vs. Torino
Lazio	25,000	61,000	vs. Roma
Livorno	8,500	13,000	vs Sampdoria
Messina	11,500	17,500	vs. Milan
Milan	47,000	79,000	vs Internazionale
Palermo	24,000	35,000	vs Catania
Parma	15,000	20,000	vs Internazionale
Reggina	12,500	21,000	vs Milan
Roma	38,689	61,292	vs Lazio
Sampdoria	19,000	27,000	vs Internazionale
Siena	8,000	14,000	vs Internazionale
Torino	20,500	24,000	vs Internazionale
Udinese	14,500	20,000	vs Internazionale

Catania hosted Ascoli, Fiorentina, Inter, Lazio, Reggina, Roma, Siena and Torino at neutral venues without fans, and Milan and Chievo Verona in Bologna, but with fans welcome.

Milan outnumbered every other team for the highest number of season ticket holders with 37,000, with Inter not far behind with 35,000 season ticket holders.

The lowest attendance for the season was recorded in the Ascoli vs Cagliari match, in the final day of the league, that attracted a mere 2,800 people.

== See also ==
- 2006–07 Serie B
- 2006–07 Coppa Italia
- List of Italian football transfers 2006-07
