= 2006–07 AS Livorno Calcio season =

Livorno
2006–07 season
- President: Aldo Spinelli
- Manager: Daniele Arrigoni; Fernando Orsi
- Stadium: Stadio Armando Picchi
- Serie A: 11th
- Coppa Italia: Round of 16
- UEFA Cup: Round of 32
- Top goalscorer: League: Cristiano Lucarelli (20); All: Cristiano Lucarelli (20)
- Average home league attendance: 8,026

The 2006–07 season was the third consecutive season of AS Livorno Calcio in the top flight.

== Players ==
=== First-team squad ===
Note: Flags indicate national team as defined under FIFA eligibility rules; some limited exceptions apply. Players may hold more than one non-FIFA nationality.

No.	Pos.	Nation	Player
1	GK	(Italy) ITA	Marco Amelia
3	MF	(Italy) ITA	Antonio Filippini
4	MF	(Italy) ITA	Stefano Morrone
5	MF	(Italy) ITA	Stefano Argilli
6	DF	(Italy) ITA	Fabio Galante
7	DF	(France) FRA	Marc Pfertzel
8	MF	(Portugal) POR	José Luís Vidigal
9	MF	(Denmark) DEN	Martin Bergvold
11	MF	(Italy) ITA	Luca Vigiani
14	DF	(Ghana) GHA	Samuel Kuffour
15	DF	(Croatia) CRO	Dario Knežević
18	DF	(Iran) IRN	Rahman Rezaei

No.	Pos.	Nation	Player
19	MF	(Italy) ITA	Stefano Fiore
20	FW	(Ivory Coast) CIV	Ibrahima Bakayoko
21	FW	(Brazil) BRA	Paulinho
22	DF	(Brazil) BRA	César
23	GK	(Italy) ITA	Emanuele Manitta
24	MF	(Italy) ITA	Carmine Coppola
26	DF	(Italy) ITA	Giovanni Pasquale
28	MF	(Italy) ITA	Dario Passoni
32	DF	(Italy) ITA	Simone Pavan
69	DF	(Italy) ITA	David Balleri
77	DF	(Italy) ITA	Alessandro Grandoni
78	FW	(Lithuania) LTU	Tomas Danilevičius
99	FW	(Italy) ITA	Cristiano Lucarelli

== Competitions ==
=== Overall record ===
Competition	First match	Last match	Starting round	Final position	Record							
Competition	First match	Last match	Starting round	Final position	Pld	W	D	L	GF	GA	GD	Win %
Serie A	9 September 2006	27 May 2007	Matchday 1	11th	38	10	13	15	41	54	−13	26.32
Coppa Italia	8 November 2006	6 December 2006	Round of 16	Round of 16	2	0	1	1	2	3	−1	0.00
UEFA Cup	14 September 2006	22 February 2007	First round	Round of 32	8	3	2	3	9	9	+0	37.50
Total					48	13	16	19	52	66	−14	27.08

Source: Competitions

=== Serie A ===
==== League table ====
Pos	Team	Pld	W	D	L	GF	GA	GD	Pts	Qualification or relegation
9	Sampdoria	38	13	10	15	44	48	−4	49	Qualification to Intertoto Cup third round (Note: Sampdoria gained entry to the 2007 UEFA Intertoto Cup after Atalanta renounced. Sampdoria then qualified for the 2007–08 UEFA Cup first round.)
10	Udinese	38	12	10	16	49	55	−6	46	
11	Livorno	38	10	13	15	41	54	−13	43	
12	Parma	38	10	12	16	41	56	−15	42	
13	Catania	38	10	11	17	46	68	−22	41	

Rules for classification: 1) points; 2) goal difference; 3) number of goals scored.

==== Results summary ====
Overall								Home						Away					
Pld	W	D	L	GF	GA	GD	Pts	W	D	L	GF	GA	GD	W	D	L	GF	GA	GD
38	10	13	15	41	54	−13	43	8	8	3	24	15	+9	2	5	12	17	39	−22

==== Results by round ====
Round	1	2	3	4	5	6	7	8	9	10	11	12	13	14	15	16	17	18	19	20	21	22	23	24	25	26	27	28	29	30	31	32	33	34	35	36	37	38
Ground	A	H	A	H	A	A	H	A	H	H	A	H	A	H	A	H	A	H	A	H	A	H	A	H	H	A	H	A	A	H	A	H	A	H	A	H	A	H
Result	L	W	D	D	W	W	D	L	D	W	L	W	D	L	L	D	L	D	L	D	L	W	L	W	D	D	L	D	L	W	L	D	L	L	L	W	D	W
Position	15	9	10	10	7	5	6	6	7	5	6	4	4	4	7	7	10	9	11	12	12	11	12	11	12	11	12	11	11	10	11	11	11	12	13	11	11	11

A = Away; H = Home; W = Win; D = Draw; L = Loss

==== Matches ====
9 September 2006 1	Roma	2–0	Livorno	Rome
CEST (UTC+2)				Stadium: Stadio Olimpico

17 September 2006 2	Livorno	1–0	Fiorentina	Livorno
CEST (UTC+2)				Stadium: Stadio Armando Picchi

20 September 2006 3	Cagliari	2–2	Livorno	Cagliari
CEST (UTC+2)				Stadium: Stadio Sant'Elia

23 September 2006 4	Livorno	0–0	Milan	Livorno
CEST (UTC+2)				Stadium: Stadio Armando Picchi

1 October 2006 5	Messina	0–1	Livorno	Messina
CEST (UTC+2)				Stadium: Stadio San Filippo

15 October 2006 6	Ascoli	0–2	Livorno	Ascoli Piceno
CEST (UTC+2)				Stadium: Stadio Cino e Lillo Del Duca

22 October 2006 7	Livorno	0–0	Siena	Livorno
CEST (UTC+2)				Stadium: Stadio Armando Picchi

25 October 2006 8	Internazionale	4–1	Livorno	Milan
CEST (UTC+2)				Stadium: San Siro

29 October 2006 9	Livorno	0–0	Empoli	Livorno
CEST (UTC+2)				Stadium: Stadio Armando Picchi

5 November 2006 10	Livorno	1–0	Udinese	Livorno
CET (UTC+1)				Stadium: Stadio Armando Picchi

12 November 2006 11	Catania	3–2	Livorno	Catania
CET (UTC+1)				Stadium: Stadio Angelo Massimino

19 November 2006 12	Livorno	3–0	Parma	Livorno
CET (UTC+1)				Stadium: Stadio Armando Picchi

26 November 2006 13	Reggina	2–2	Livorno	Reggio-Emilia
CET (UTC+1)				Stadium: Stadio Oreste Granillo

3 December 2006 14	Livorno	0–2	Chievo	Livorno
CET (UTC+1)				Stadium: Stadio Armando Picchi

9 December 2006 15	Palermo	3–0	Livorno	Palermo
CET (UTC+1)

17 December 2006 16	Livorno	1–1	Lazio	Livorno
CET (UTC+1)				Stadium: Stadio Armando Picchi

20 December 2006 17	Sampdoria	4–1	Livorno	Genoa
CET (UTC+1)

23 December 2006 18	Livorno	1–1	Torino	Livorno
CET (UTC+1)				Stadium: Stadio Armando Picchi

14 January 2007 19	Atalanta	5–1	Livorno	Bergamo
CET (UTC+1)

21 January 2007 20	Livorno	1–1	Roma	Livorno
CET (UTC+1)				Stadium: Stadio Armando Picchi

29 January 2007 21	Fiorentina	2–1	Livorno	Florence
CET (UTC+1)

11 February 2007 23	Milan	2–1	Livorno	Milan
CET (UTC+1)

18 February 2007 24	Livorno	2–1	Messina	Livorno
CET (UTC+1)				Stadium: Stadio Armando Picchi

25 February 2007 25	Livorno	0–0	Ascoli	Livorno
CET (UTC+1)				Stadium: Stadio Armando Picchi

28 February 2007 26	Siena	0–0	Livorno	Siena
CET (UTC+1)

3 March 2007 27	Livorno	1–2	Internazionale	Livorno
CET (UTC+1)				Stadium: Stadio Armando Picchi

11 March 2007 28	Empoli	2–2	Livorno	Empoli
CET (UTC+1)

18 March 2007 29	Udinese	4–0	Livorno	Udine
CET (UTC+1)

1 April 2007 30	Livorno	4–1	Catania	Livorno
CET (UTC+1)				Stadium: Stadio Armando Picchi

7 April 2007 31	Parma	1–0	Livorno	Parma
CET (UTC+1)	Rossi 90'			Stadium: Stadio Ennio Tardini; Referee: Paolo Dondarini

15 April 2007 32	Livorno	1–1	Reggina	Livorno
CET (UTC+1)	Lucarelli 28'		Bianchi 31'	Stadium: Stadio Armando Picchi; Referee: Massimiliano Saccani

18 April 2007 22	Livorno	2–1	Cagliari	Livorno
CET (UTC+1)				Stadium: Stadio Armando Picchi

22 April 2007 33	Chievo	2–1	Livorno	Verona
CEST (UTC+2)

29 April 2007 34	Livorno	1–2	Palermo	Livorno
CEST (UTC+2)				Stadium: Stadio Armando Picchi

6 May 2007 35	Lazio	1–0	Livorno	Rome
CEST (UTC+2)

13 May 2007 36	Livorno	1–0	Sampdoria	Livorno
CEST (UTC+2)				Stadium: Stadio Armando Picchi

20 May 2007 37	Torino	0–0	Livorno	Turin
CEST (UTC+2)

27 May 2007 38	Livorno	4–2	Atalanta	Livorno
CEST (UTC+2)				Stadium: Stadio Armando Picchi

=== Coppa Italia ===
==== Round of 16 ====
8 November 2006 First leg	Arezzo	2–1	Livorno	Arezzo
CEST (UTC+2)				Stadium: Stadio Città di Arezzo

6 December 2006 Second leg	Livorno	1–1 (2–3 agg.)	Arezzo	Livorno
CEST (UTC+2)				Stadium: Stadio Armando Picchi
