= Ricardo Faty =

Footballer (born 1986)

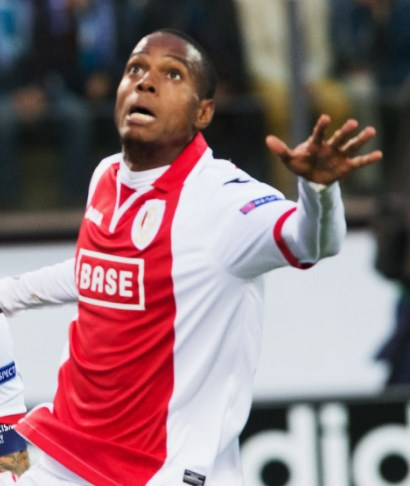
- Faty playing for Standard Liège in 2014

Personal information
- Full name: Ricardo William Faty
- Date of birth: 4 August 1986 (age 40)
- Place of birth: Villeneuve-Saint-Georges, France
- Height: 1.92 m (6 ft 4 in)
- Position: Defensive midfielder

Youth career
- 1999–2002: INF Clairefontaine
- 2002–2005: Strasbourg

Senior career*
Years	Team	Apps	(Gls)
2005–2006	Strasbourg	7	(0)
2006–2010	Roma	19	(0)
2007	→ Bayer Leverkusen (loan)	2	(0)
2008–2009	→ Nantes (loan)	41	(3)
2010–2012	Aris	47	(3)
2012–2014	Ajaccio	47	(4)
2014–2015	Standard Liège	31	(4)
2015–2018	Bursaspor	54	(2)
2018–2020	Ankaragücü	48	(3)
2020–2022	Reggina	3	(0)

International career^{‡}
2006–2007	France U21	8	(1)
2012	Senegal	5	(0)
- * Club domestic league appearances and goals as of 6 May 2022 ‡ National team caps and goals as of 26 December 2016

Ricardo William Faty (born 4 August 1986) is a former professional footballer who played as a midfielder. Born in France, he played for the Senegal national team.

== Career ==
Faty was born in Villeneuve-Saint-Georges, France. His football career began with Strasbourg in the 2004–05 season of the Championnat de France Amateurs, in which he played 27 matches and scored one goal. The following year he earned fourteen more caps in the CFA, along with twelve matches for RC Strasbourg's professional squad, five being in cup competition. His Ligue 1 debut was on 29 October 2005.

During 2005–06 UEFA Cup, A.S. Roma faced Strasbourg in the group stage, and Luciano Spalletti noted the young Frenchman, so the following year, due to Strasbourg's relegation to Ligue 2 and Olivier Dacourt's departure from Roma to Inter Milan, Faty was signed to giallorossi for a fee of 350,000 Euros for a five-year contract.

He made his Champions League debut with Roma against Olympiacos at the Karaiskákis Stadium. He was given the job of man-marking the former Brazilian star Rivaldo. Roma eventually won the match 1–0. He employed this role so well and efficiently that Luciano Spalletti praised him and many tabloids and newspapers named him the "new" Patrick Vieira.

At the end of his first season in Serie A he said that, though he was satisfied of his experience at A.S. Roma, he would like to transfer on loan to have more chances to play and thus, on 6 July, he moved to German team Bayer Leverkusen for a two-year loan. In January 2008, he was loaned to FC Nantes, where he stayed until the end of the 2008–09 Ligue 1 season. On 31 July 2010, it was revealed that Faty would be joining English Premier League club Blackburn Rovers on trial for an undisclosed length of time. The trial came to nothing as Faty then signed for Greek club Aris Salonica.

In his first season in Thessaloniki (2010–2011), Faty played in about 35 matches and scored two goals (against Kerkyra and Rosenborg BK).

In 2012, he joined Ajaccio.

On 18 August 2014, Faty signed a four-year contract with Standard Liège.

In the summer 2018, Faty joined Turkish club MKE Ankaragücü. On 9 May 2019, he announced on Instagram, that he had terminated his contract with the club, according to him because he was left out of the squad and had not received his salary.

On 16 September 2020, Faty joined Reggina, signing a three-year contract. He missed most of the 2020–21 season with injuries and made no appearances in the 2021–22 season for the club. On 6 August 2022, his contract with Reggina was terminated by mutual consent.

After leaving Reggina, Faty returned to France and played for C'Chartres Football during the 2022–23 season before retiring in 2023. In a January 2026 interview, he said he had begun coaching at INF Clairefontaine following the end of his playing career, while also working as a television pundit in France.

== Personal life ==
He is the younger brother of Jacques Faty, who is also a professional footballer. Though they were born in France, their father is Senegalese-Vietnamese and their mother is from Cape Verde. His father is Muslim and his mother is Catholic, while Faty converted to Islam at age 20.

== Honours ==
Strasbourg

- Coupe de la Ligue: 2004–05

Roma

- Coppa Italia: 2006–07; runner-up: 2009–10
- Supercoppa Italiana runner-up: 2006

Nantes

- Ligue 2: runner-up 2007–08
