= Valerio Virga =

Italian footballer

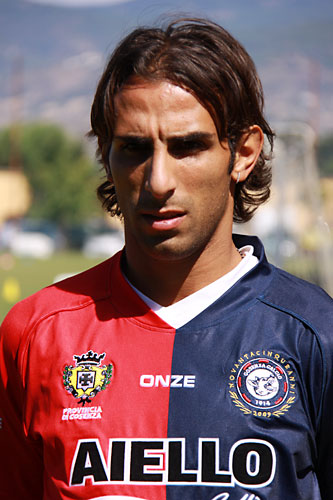

Personal information
- Full name: Valerio Virga
- Date of birth: June 6, 1986 (age 40)
- Place of birth: Rome, Italy
- Height: 1.81 m (5 ft 11 in)
- Position: Midfielder

Team information
- Current team: Omegna

Youth career
- Roma

Senior career*
Years	Team	Apps	(Gls)
2004–2014	Roma	11	(0)
2005–2006	→ Ascoli (loan)	0	(0)
2007–2008	→ Grosseto (loan)	22	(0)
2009	→ Novara (loan)	6	(0)
2009–2010	→ Cosenza (loan)	20	(2)
2011–2012	→ Lanciano (loan)	0	(0)
2013–2014	→ Aprilia (loan)	0	(0)
2014–2015	Monterotondo		
2016	Borgosesia	5	(0)
2016–	Omegna		

International career^{‡}
2004	Italy U-18	5	(1)
2004	Italy U-19	6	(0)
2006	Italy U-21	1	(0)
- * Club domestic league appearances and goals as of 13 December 2006 ‡ National team caps and goals as of 22 May 2012

Valerio Virga (born 6 June 1986) is an Italian footballer who plays as a midfielder for Promozione club Omegna. He played in Serie A for Roma.

== Club career ==
A product of the A.S. Roma youth academy and one of the bright prospects of the Giallorossi, Virga usually plays as midfielder. He made his Serie A debut on 10 April 2005, in an away league match against Udinese Calcio which ended in a 3–3 draw. He made six appearances in season 2004–2005, but never scored a goal.

In 2005–2006, he was signed by Palermo in a co-ownership agreement with AS Roma, and then loaned to newly promoted top-flight team Ascoli, being however soon relegated to the youth squad without playing a game. He returned to AS Roma in 2006–2007.

He scored his first goal for Roma in the Coppa Italia match in a Round of 32 match against Triestina on November 29, 2006. Roma won the match 2–0. He played his first Champions League match against Valencia on December 5, 2006, which Roma won 1–0.

He then spent the 2007–08 season on loan to Serie B side Grosseto. He made a total of 23 appearances with the biancorossi, but only 11 of them as a start-up player. In 2008–09, he came back to Roma his debut that year was in a 2–0 victory over Atalanta at the Stadio Olimpico, where he came as a substitute for Menez. With the close of the January transfer window on February 2, 2009, he was once again loaned out, this time to the C1 side Novara Calcio.

On 26 August 2009, he joined Cosenza on loan.

On 31 August 2011 he left for Lanciano in a temporary deal, with an option to buy.

Virga became a free agent on 1 July 2014.

== International career ==
He made his U-21 team debut against Luxembourg U21, 12 December 2006, playing in the first half of the match.
