= Derby dello Stretto =

Football derby in Italy

- Other names: Derby of the Strait
- Location: Southern Italy
- Teams: Messina; Reggina
- First meeting: Messina 2-2 Reggina; 1928-29 Campionato Meridionale (23 December 1928)
- Latest meeting: Messina 2–0 Reggina; 2016–17 Lega Pro (29 December 2016)
- Stadiums: Stadio San Filippo (Messina); Stadio Oreste Granillo (Reggio Calabria)

Statistics
- Most wins: Messina (32)

The Derby dello Stretto is an association football derby in Southern Italy contested by Messina and Reggina. The phrase translates into English as Derby of the Strait, since the two clubs are based in the towns of Messina and Reggio Calabria on the opposite sides of the Strait of Messina which separates mainland Italy from Sicily.

The derby has mostly been played in lower level and cup competitions. Only six derbies have been played in Serie A, during the three seasons from 2004 to 2007 when both clubs played in the Italian top level. At the end of the 2006–07 season Messina were relegated, followed by Reggina in 2008–09. As of the 2016–17 season, both clubs play in Group C of the Lega Pro, one of the three regional groups of the Italian third level.

== Statistics ==
As of 28 April 2017

Competition	Games played	Wins		Draws
Competition	Games played	Messina	Reggina	Draws
Serie A	6	3	2	1
Serie B	18	6	6	6
Serie C	35	16	13	6
Total league	59	25	21	13
Coppa Italia	4	2	1	1
Coppa Italia Serie C	12	5	5	2
Total Coppa Italia	16	7	6	3
Total	75	32	27	16
