= Dario Dainelli =

Italian footballer (born 1979)

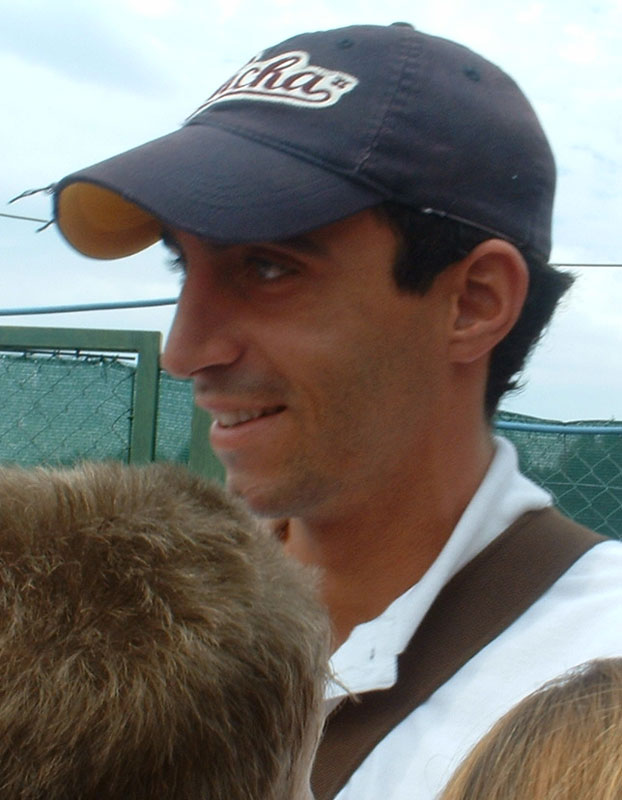

Personal information
- Date of birth: 9 June 1979 (age 47)
- Place of birth: Pontedera, Italy
- Height: 1.91 m (6 ft 3 in)
- Position: Centre back

Youth career
- 1996–1998: Empoli

Senior career*
Years	Team	Apps	(Gls)
1998–2000	Empoli	0	(0)
1998–1999	→ Modena (loan)	0	(0)
1999	→ Cavese (loan)	10	(0)
1999–2000	→ Fidelis Andria (loan)	28	(1)
2000–2001	Lecce	14	(0)
2001–2004	Brescia	60	(1)
2002	→ Verona (loan)	13	(0)
2004–2010	Fiorentina	143	(7)
2010–2012	Genoa	57	(1)
2012	→ Chievo (loan)	6	(0)
2012–2018	Chievo	161	(3)
2018–2019	Livorno	17	(0)

International career
2002	Italy U21	1	(0)
2005	Italy	1	(0)
- * Club domestic league appearances and goals as of 20 May 2018

Dario Dainelli (Italian pronunciation: [ˈdaːrjo daiˈnɛlli]; born 9 June 1979) is an Italian former professional footballer who played as a defender.

== Club career ==
=== Early career ===
Born in Pontedera, Province of Pisa, Dainelli started his professional career at Empoli. He spent his early years on loan at Modena (Serie C1), Cavese (Serie C2) and Fidelis Andria (Serie C1).

He was signed by Lecce in 2000 in a co-ownership deal and made his Serie A debut against Roma on 18 February 2001.

=== Brescia ===
After just one season at Lecce, he re-signed for Empoli before moving to Brescia.

Except for the first season which he just made five appearances and left on loan to Serie A rival Verona, he made 56 appearances more for Brescia.

=== Fiorentina ===
In July 2004, Dainelli signed for newly promoted team Fiorentina, in a co-ownership deal with Brescia. In January 2005, Fiorentina immediately bought all of the remain registration rights.

Dainelli was the team captain after Christian Riganò left the club in summer 2005, a position which he hold until his transfer to Genoa.

At the end of 2006–07 season, due to his contract expiring on summer, some rumor linked him with Juventus and other Italian clubs, but on 9 June 2007, he finally signed a new four-year contract extension with Fiorentina.

In summer 2009, ACF Fiorentina prepared to sell the captain by signing Cesare Natali in order to increase the depth of the bench. Alessandro Gamberini, Per Krøldrup and Dainelli rotated at the starting pair of the central defender.

=== Genoa ===
After the signing of Felipe, on 12 January 2010 Dainelli was transferred to Genoa with whom he signed a contract which lasted until June 2013.

=== Chievo ===
On 31 January 2012, the last day of 2011–12 winter transfer window, Dainelli moved to the fellow league club Chievo Verona on a loan deal. He returned to Genoa after the loan deal expired at 30 June 2012 and then terminated his contract with Genoa. On 7 August 2012, he agreed a permanent deal with Chievo.

=== Livorno ===
On 16 July 2018, Dainelli signed with Livorno. On 13 May 2019, he announced his retirement.

== International career ==
Dainelli played once for Italy U21 team, on 16 April 2002. a friendly 2–3 loss to France U21.

He was also called up to 2002 UEFA European Under-21 Football Championship, but did not play.

Dainelli made his debut for the Italy national team against Ecuador on 11 June 2005 a friendly match which ended in a 1–1 draw.

He was recalled by new Italian head coach Roberto Donadoni to play in Euro 2008 qualifying against Lithuania and France on 2 September 2006 and 6 September 2006, but did not make an appearance.

== Career statistics ==
=== Club ===
Appearances and goals by club, season and competition
Club	Season	League			Cup		Continental		Total	
Club	Season	Division	Apps	Goals	Apps	Goals	Apps	Goals	Apps	Goals
Modena	1998–99	Serie C1	0	0	0	0	–		0	0
Cavese	1998–99	Serie C2	10	0	0	0	–		10	0
Andria	1999–2000	Serie C1	28	1	0	0	–		28	1
Lecce	2000–01	Serie A	14	0	0	0	–		14	0
Brescia	2001–02	Serie A	5	1	3	1	–		8	2
Verona	2001–02	Serie A	13	1			–		13	1
Brescia	2002–03	Serie A	24	0	2	0	–		26	0
Brescia	2003–04	Serie A	31	0	1	0	–		32	0
Brescia	Total		55	0	3	0	0	0	58	0
Fiorentina	2004–05	Serie A	30	4	6	0	–		36	4
Fiorentina	2005–06	Serie A	27	1	1	0	–		28	1
Fiorentina	2006–07	Serie A	31	1	2	0	–		33	1
Fiorentina	2007–08	Serie A	21	0	2	0	6	0	29	0
Fiorentina	2008–09	Serie A	21	1	0	0	8	0	29	1
Fiorentina	2009–10	Serie A	5	0	0	0	5	0	10	0
Fiorentina	Total		135	7	11	0	19	0	165	7
Genoa	2009–10	Serie A	10	0	0	0	0	0	10	0
Genoa	2010–11	Serie A	34	1	1	0	0	0	35	1
Genoa	2011–12	Serie A	13	0	2	0	0	0	15	0
Genoa	Total		57	1	3	0	0	0	60	1
Chievo Verona	2011–12	Serie A	6	0	0	0	0	0	6	0
Chievo Verona	2012–13	Serie A	34	0	1	0	0	0	35	0
Chievo Verona	2013–14	Serie A	26	2	1	0	0	0	27	2
Chievo Verona	2014–15	Serie A	30	0	1	0	0	0	31	0
Chievo Verona	2015–16	Serie A	18	1	1	0	0	0	19	1
Chievo Verona	2016–17	Serie A	26	0	1	0	0	0	27	0
Chievo Verona	2017–18	Serie A	21	0	2	0	0	0	23	0
Chievo Verona	Total		161	3	7	0	0	0	168	3
Livorno	2018–19	Serie B	17	0	1	0	0	0	18	0
Career total			494	14	28	1	19	0	542	15

=== International ===
Appearances and goals by national team and year
National team	Year	Apps	Goals
Italy	2005	1	0
Total		1	0
