= Andrea Ferrari (footballer) =

Italian footballer (born 1986)

Personal information
- Full name: Andrea Ferrari
- Date of birth: June 1, 1986 (age 40)
- Place of birth: Milan, Italy
- Height: 1.94 m (6 ft 4 1/2 in)
- Position: Goalkeeper

Senior career*
| Years | Team | Apps | (Gls) |
| 2006–2010 | Atalanta B.C. | 0 | (0) |
| 2007–2008 | → Monza (loan) | 2 | (0) |
- * Club domestic league appearances and goals as of 15:12, 1 March 2010 (UTC)

Andrea Ferrari (born 1 June 1986) is an Italian football (soccer) goalkeeper. Despite having been designated the number 1 shirt, he was still the third choice goalkeeper at Atalanta B.C. In the season 2007/08, he went on loan at Monza.
