= Luca Ariatti =

Italian footballer (born 1978)

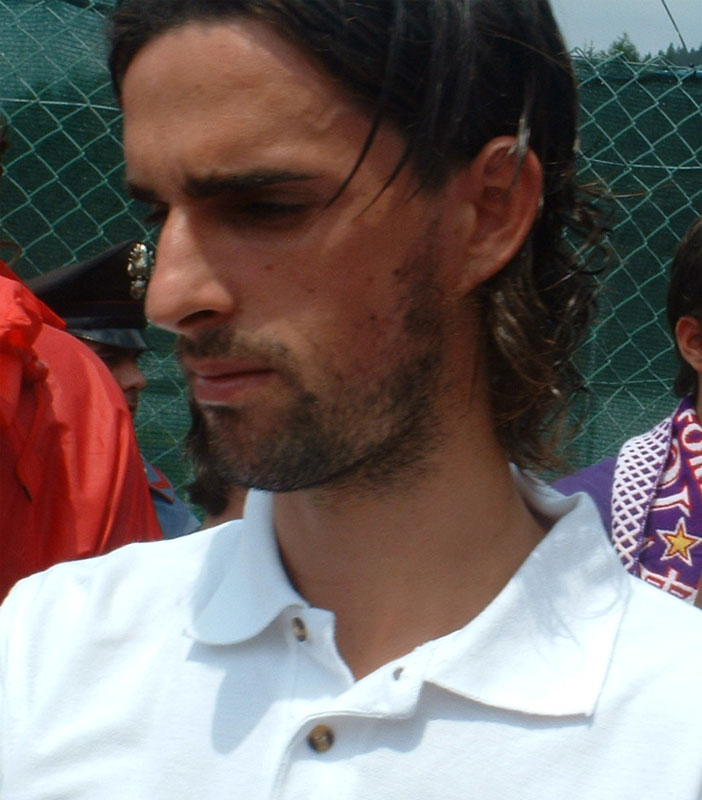
- Ariatti in 2005

Personal information
- Date of birth: 27 December 1978 (age 47)
- Place of birth: Reggio Emilia, Italy
- Height: 1.82 m (6 ft 0 in)
- Position: Defender

Youth career
- Reggiana

Senior career*
Years	Team	Apps	(Gls)
1996–2002	Reggiana	82	(4)
1998–1999	→ Ascoli (loan)	28	(0)
2003	Florentia Viola	9	(0)
2003–2005	Fiorentina	69	(2)
2005–2007	Atalanta	76	(3)
2007–2009	Lecce	69	(2)
2009–2010	Chievo	31	(0)
2010–2012	Pescara	16	(1)
- * Club domestic league appearances and goals

Luca Ariatti (born 27 December 1978) is an Italian former professional footballer who played as a defender. He participated in 31 football seasons.

As a football agent, Ariatti was involved in a scandal about faking contracts with Juventus, which made him become notable.
