= Christian Riganò =

Italian footballer and manager (born 1974)

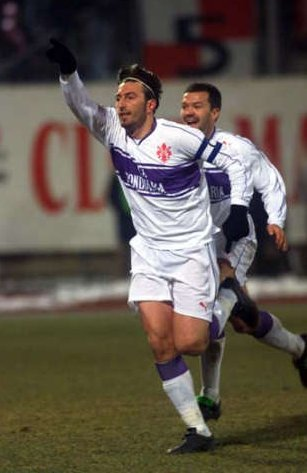

Personal information
- Date of birth: 25 May 1974 (age 52)
- Place of birth: Lipari, Italy
- Height: 1.91 m (6 ft 3 in)
- Position: Striker

Senior career*
Years	Team	Apps	(Gls)
1993–1997	Lipari	73	(34)
1997–1998	Messina	29	(3)
1998–2000	Igea Virtus	50	(28)
2000–2002	Taranto	64	(41)
2002–2006	Fiorentina	94	(57)
2005–2006	→ Empoli (loan)	33	(5)
2006–2007	Messina	27	(19)
2007	Levante	12	(4)
2008	→ Siena (loan)	17	(1)
2008–2009	Ternana	5	(0)
2009–2010	Cremonese	7	(1)
2011	Rondinella		
2011	Jolly Montemurlo		
2011–2012	Montevarchi		
2013	Benaco		
Total		479	(206)

Managerial career
- 2015–2017: Incisa
- 2019–2021: Fiesole
- 2022: Affrico
- 2025–: Casellina
- * Club domestic league appearances and goals as of 12 February 2009

Christian Riganò (born 25 May 1974) is an Italian football manager and former professional footballer who played as a striker.

== Career ==
=== Early career ===
Riganò was born in Lipari, Province of Messina. A former bricklayer, he started his career with amateur team Lipari, where he gained a reputation of a prolific striker. In 1997, he moved to then Serie D team Messina, but he failed to impress there. This was followed by two season with Igea Virtus, another Serie D team, and 28 goals with the Sicilian side.

=== Taranto ===
In 2000, at the age of 26, Riganò finally entered into professional football with Taranto, being instrumental in the rossoblu's promotion in their first season, and an impressive Serie C1 campaign the following year, being crowned Serie C1's topscorer with 27 goals in the 2001–02 season, and narrowly missing out on promotion to Serie B.

=== Florentia ===
In 2002, Riganò joined Florentia Viola of Serie C2, and scored a personal record of 30 goals in 32 matches, earning the title of top-scorer in the league once again and helping Fiorentina to obtain promotion. During the 2003–04 season, he scored 23 Serie B goals in 44 matches, helping Fiorentina to win promotion to Serie A and earning his Serie A debut at the age of 30 the following season. During the 2005–06 winter transfer window, he was loaned to Empoli with little success.

=== Messina ===
In August 2006 Riganò moved to Messina, making a very impressive season, scoring 19 goals in 26 appearances. He finished third on the top scorer chart in Serie A during the 2006–07 season, despite having sustained an injury in January which saw him miss action for three months.

=== Levante and loans ===
In August 2007 Riganò signed for Levante but scored only four goals in 13 matches during his six-month stay with the Spanish side (three of which came in a hat-trick against Almería, making him the second Italian player after Christian Vieri to score a hat-trick in La Liga), being then loaned out to Siena during the January transfer window.

He was released by Levante after the Valencian club went relegated to Segunda División.

=== Later years ===
Free agent Riganò joined Lega Pro Prima Divisione club Ternana on 31 August 2008. His time at Ternana however proved to be disappointing, as Riganò played only a handful of matches, being then excluded from the first team on November. On 2 February 2009 Riganò accepted a permanent move to Cremonese, another Lega Pro Prima Divisione club, where he re-joined Emiliano Mondonico, his former head coach at Fiorentina. He successively left Cremonese at the end of the season, and signed with Italian club Rondinella, the second team of Florence.

== Style of play ==
A large and tall striker who excelled in the air, Riganò was neither fast nor particularly powerful, but was known for his opportunism, anticipation, heading accuracy and eye for goal, despite his poor work-rate and struggles with fitness and weight-gain in his later career; due to his prolific goalscoring and place of birth, he earned the nicknames il bomber di Lipari and Riga-Gol. A former defender, he was a well-rounded forward, who possessed excellent movement, timing, and positional sense, which made him a difficult player to mark. Usually deployed as a centre-forward, he was also capable of using his physical strength and technical skills to hold up the ball for his team-mates when playing with his back to goal, and of providing them with assists in addition to scoring goals himself, and was an accurate penalty taker.

== Honours ==
=== Club ===
Taranto

- Serie C2: 2000–01

Florentia Viola

- Serie C2: 2002–03

=== Individual ===
- Serie C1 Top-scorer: 2001–02 (27 goals)
- Serie C2 Top-scorer 2002–03 (30 goals)
- Fiorentina Hall of Fame
