= Riccardo Zampagna =

Italian footballer

Personal information
- Date of birth: 15 November 1974 (age 51)
- Place of birth: Terni, Italy
- Height: 1.83 m (6 ft 0 in)
- Position: Striker

Youth career
- 1991–1993: Amerina

Senior career*
Years	Team	Apps	(Gls)
1993–1996	Amerina		
1996–1997	Pontevecchio	22	(13)
1997–1998	Triestina	29	(9)
1999	Arezzo	9	(3)
1999	Catania	18	(2)
2000	Brescello	12	(3)
2000	Perugia	0	(0)
2000–2002	Cosenza	29	(10)
2001–2002	→ Siena (loan)	29	(7)
2002–2006	Messina	72	(31)
2003–2004	→ Ternana (co-ownership)	41	(21)
2006–2007	Atalanta	44	(17)
2008	Vicenza	16	(6)
2008–2010	Sassuolo	61	(16)
2010–2011	Carrarese	10	(2)
- * Club domestic league appearances and goals

Riccardo Zampagna (born 15 November 1974) is an Italian former footballer who played as a striker.

== Playing career ==
After spending most of his career in the lower leagues (Serie C1, Serie C2 and D, from 2000 in the second tier), Zampagna finally debuted in Serie A with Messina. In January 2006, he signed with Atalanta B.C. (then in Serie B), achieving promotion that season, and scoring 11 times in the club's 2006–07 first division campaign.

On 19 November 2007, after displaying conduct detrimental to the team, he was suspended by coach Luigi Delneri and subsequently sold on the first day of January's transfer window, joining Vicenza (swapped with the remain 50% registration rights of Simone Padoin). In July 2008, Zampagna agreed to join newly promoted Serie B outfit Sassuolo for €1 million.

== Managerial career ==
He was manager of lower league side Macchie from 2013 to 2014.
