= Stadio San Filippo =

Football stadium in Messina, Italy

Coordinates: 38°9′41″N 15°31′15″E

Stadio San Filippo - Franco Scoglio
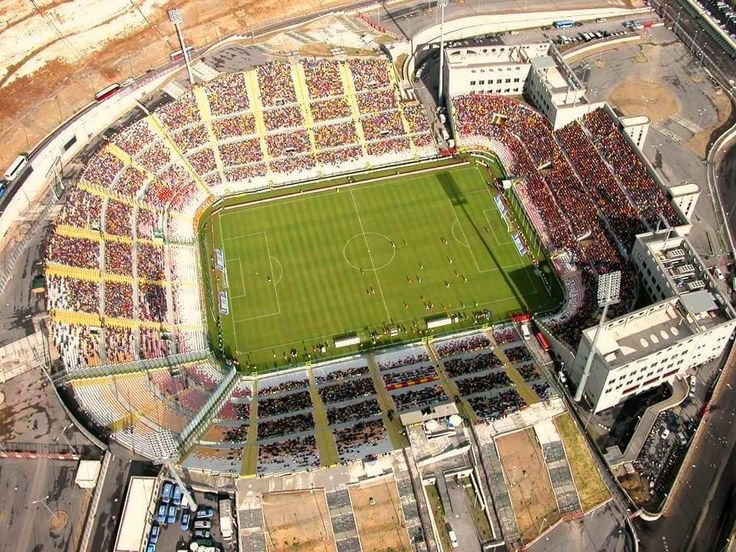
- Interactive map of Stadio San Filippo - Franco Scoglio
- Location: Messina, Sicily, Italy
- Owner: Municipality of Messina
- Capacity: 38,722
- Surface: Grass; 105 x 70 m

Construction
- Groundbreaking: 2003
- Opened: August 17, 2004

Tenants
- A.C.R. Messina (2004–present); Italy national football team (selected matches)

Stadio San Filippo - Franco Scoglio (Saint Philip Stadium) is a football stadium in Messina, Italy. It is currently the home of A.C.R. Messina. It is currently the largest stadium in Europe to not have eligibility to host FIFA World Cup group matches or UEFA Europa League final.

== History ==
The stadium was initially commissioned at the start of the 1990s, but was not finished until 2004. It was officially opened on August 17, 2004 with Messina playing host to Juventus in a match they lost 1–0. The first official match was a week later, on August 22, the Coppa Italia match Messina–Acireale (4–0). It replaced the old 11,900 seat Stadio Comunale Giovanni Celeste, which is currently the home ground of the new club of S.S.D. Città di Messina.

== Structure ==
The total area is 114,640 sm, of which 44,300 sm reserved to car parking and 70,340 sm to a service building close to the stadium. There is no athletic track around the field, and the visibility is very good in each sector. There is a total absence of a covered seating section anywhere in the stadium, however an agreement between the team owners and the municipality aims to rectify the problem in the near future.

== Trivia ==
The stadium name is derived from the neighborhood of Messina where it was built, but a couple of petitions hope to rename it either after the former Messina manager Franco Scoglio (1941–2005) or the Messina native, Saint Annibale Maria di Francia (1851–1927).

== Milestone matches ==
22 August 2004	(Italy) Messina	4–0	Acireale (Italy)	2004–05 Coppa Italia; First Coppa Italia Match
17:30 CEST	Zampagna 7'; Parisi 24' (pen.); Yanagisawa 45+1'; Rafael 79'			Referee: Antonio Dattilo

19 September 2004	(Italy) Messina	4–3	Roma (Italy)	2004–05 Serie A First Serie A Match
15:00 CEST	Parisi 21' (pen.); Sullo 46'; Giampà 74'; Zampagna 78'		Montella 36', 64', 68'	Referee: Pierluigi Collina

== National team matches ==
17 November 2004	Italy	1–0	Finland	Friendly match
20:30 CET	Miccoli 33'			Attendance: 7,043; Referee: Alexandru Tudor (Romania)
