= List of Italian football transfers summer 2007 =

Sports trivia list

This is a list of Italian football transfers for the 2007–08 season. Only moves from Serie A and Serie B are listed.

The summer transfer window ran from the end of the 2006–07 season, with a few transfers taking place prior to the season's complete end. The window closed on 31 August. The mid-season transfer window opened on 1 January 2008, and ran for the entire month, until 31 January. Players without a club could join one, either during or between transfer windows.

== Summer transfer window ==
=== Date unknown ===
Date	Name	Moving from	Moving to	Fee
	Fabio Romeo	Lecce (youth)	Giacomense (amateur)	Loan
	Fabio Pisacane	Genoa	Lanciano	Loan
	Giacomo Cotellessa	Genoa (youth)	Valenzana	Loan
	Alessandro Polinesi	Ascoli (youth)	Sangiustese (amateur)	Free
	Matteo Lombardo	Internazionale	Portogruaro	Loan
	Daniel Maa Boumsong (Cameroon)	Treviso	Pistoiese	Loan
	Ibrahima Bakayoko (Ivory Coast)	Messina	(Greece) AEL	
	Federico Piazza	Milan	Cremonese	Loan
	Davide Astori	Milan	Cremonese	Loan
	Giovanni Bartolucci	Siena	Monza	
	Abdoulaye Diarra (Ivory Coast)	Cagliari	(Slovenia) Maribor	Undisclosed
	Daniel Adejo (Nigeria)	Este	Reggina	Undisclosed
	Salvatore Ferraro	Milan	Benevento	Undisclosed
	Fabrizio Cacciatore	Sampdoria	Foligno	Loan
	Juliano Elizeu Vicentini (Brazil) (Italy)	Lecce	Pisa	
	Alberto Galuppo	Parma	Ancona	Loan
	Salvatore Burrai	Cagliari	Manfredonia	Loan
	Mirco Gasparetto	Empoli	Genoa	Undisclosed
	José Coelho	Internazionale	(Portugal) Benfica	Youth
	Matteo Deinite	Internazionale	Portogruaro Summaga	Undisclosed
	Matteo Giordano	Internazionale	Sanremese	Free
	Marco Varaldi	Milan	Lecco	Loan
	Davide Favaro	Parma	Giulianova	Loan
	Marco Sau	Cagliari	Manfredonia	Loan
	Simone Ciancio	Sampdoria	Pizzighettone	Loan
	Mirko Valdifiori	Cesena	Legnano	Loan
	Andrea Torta	Juventus	Fano	Loan
	Andrea Pozzato	Juventus	Tritium	Loan
	Nicola Silvestri	Genoa	Lanciano	Loan
	Alex Valentini	Mantova	Sambonifacese	Loan
	Michele Franco	Bari	Manfredonia	Loan
	Stefano Mandorino	Lecce	Scafatese	Loan
	Maikol Negro	Torino	Celano	Undisclosed
	Nikolas Kras	Reggina	Manfredonia	Loan
	Fabio Lebran	Parma	Carpenedolo	Loan
	Francesco Checcucci	Fiorentina (youth)	Prato (youth)	Free
	Luis Maria Alfageme (Argentina) (Italy)	Brescia	Pescara	Loan
	Mohamadou Sissoko	Udinese	Celano	Loan
	Andrea Stucchi	Atalanta	Varese	Loan
	Pietro Tripoli	Palermo	Varese	Loan

=== July ===
Date	Name	Nat	Moving from	Moving to	Fee
2007-01-16^{1}	Hasan Salihamidžić	Bosnia and Herzegovina	(Germany) Bayern Munich	Juventus	Free
2007-02-22^{1}	Zdeněk Grygera	Czech Republic	(Netherlands) Ajax	Juventus	Free
2007-04-09	Pape Moussa Diakhatè	Senegal	(Senegal) A.S. de Cambérène	Fiorentina (youth)	€0.2M
2007-05-30	Sulley Muntari	Ghana	Udinese	(England) Portsmouth	Undisclosed
2007-05-30^{1}	Babu	Brazil	Lecce	Catania	Free
2007-05-30^{1}	Giacomo Tedesco	Italy	Reggina	Catania	Free
2007-05-30	Hernán Crespo	Argentina	(England) Chelsea	Internazionale	Loan
2007-06-02	Jan Hable	Czech Republic	(Czech Republic) Hradec	Fiorentina	€1.11M
2007-06-02	Ondrej Mazuch	Czech Republic	(Czech Republic) Brno	Fiorentina	€1.33M
2007-06-09	Lukáš Jarolím	Czech Republic	(Czech Republic) Slavia Praha	Siena	Free
2007-06-11	Mattia Serafini	Italy	Ravenna	AlbinoLeffe	Free
2007-06-12	Igor Tudor	Croatia	Juventus	(Croatia) Hajduk Split	Free
2007-06-15	Claudio Bellucci	Italy	Bologna	Sampdoria	Free
2007-06-17	Eugenio Corini	Italy	Palermo	Torino	Free
2007-06-18	Joaquín Larrivey	Argentina	(Argentina) Huracán	Cagliari	Undisclosed
2007-06-19^{1}	Vincenzo Iaquinta	Italy	Udinese	Juventus	€11.25M
2007-06-20	Simone Dell'Agnello	Italy	Livorno (youth)	Internazionale (youth)	Undisclosed
20 June 2007	Davide Biondini	Italy	Reggina	Cagliari	Undisclosed
2007-06-20^{1}	Federico Balzaretti	Italy	Juventus	Fiorentina	€3.8M
2007-06-20	Vince Grella	Australia	Parma	Torino	Undisclosed
2007-06-21	Juan	Brazil	(Germany) Leverkusen	Roma	€6.3M
2007-06-21	Stefano Pardini	Italy	Carrarese	Ravenna	Free
2007-06-21	Paolo Zanetti	Italy	Ascoli	Torino	Co-ownership, undisclosed
2007-06-21	Mirko Vučinić	Montenegro	Lecce	Roma	Co-ownrership, €3.25M
2007-06-22^{1}	Sergio Almirón	Argentina	Empoli	Juventus	€9m
2007-06-22^{1}	Tiago	Portugal	(France) Lyon	Juventus	€13M+bonus
2007-06-22	Andrea Caracciolo	Italy	Palermo	Sampdoria	Co-ownership, €4.25M
2007-06-22	Paolo Sammarco	Italy	Milan	Sampdoria	Co-ownership, €1.5M
2007-06-23	Massimo Donati	Italy	Milan	(Scotland) Celtic	€2M
2007-06-26	Riccardo Musetti	Italy	Massese	Treviso	Free
2007-06-26	Andrea Luci	Italy	Juventus	Ascoli	Co-ownership, undisclosed
2007-06-26	Fabio Prosperi	Italy	Taranto	Frosinone	Undisclosed
2007-06-27	Emanuele Filippini	Italy	Treviso	Livorno	Free
2007-06-27	Fausto Rossini	Italy	Catania	Livorno	Undisclosed
2007-06-27	Fabio Ceccarelli	Italy	Gela	Treviso	Undisclosed
2007-06-28	Ignazio Abate	Italy	Milan	Empoli	Co-ownership, €0.9M
2007-06-28	Luca Antonini	Italy	Milan	Empoli	Co-ownership, €1M
2007-06-28	Lino Marzoratti	Italy	Milan	Empoli	Co-ownership, €0.75M
2007-06-29	Boško Janković	Serbia	(Spain) Mallorca	Palermo	€6.2M
2007-06-29	Marek Hamšík	Slovakia	Brescia	Napoli	€5.5M
2007-06-29	Salvatore Aurelio	Italy	Genoa	Cesena	co-ownership, €0.5M
2007-06-29^{1}	Olivier Kapo	France	Juventus	(England) Birmingham City	€2.3M
2007-06-29^{1}	Matteo Paro	Italy	Juventus	Genoa	Co-ownership, €1.5M
2007-06-30	Dario Passoni	Italy	Livorno	Mantova	Undisclosed
2007-06-30	Francesco Tavano	Italy	(Spain) Valencia	Livorno	Undisclosed
2007-06-30	Massimo Loviso	Italy	Bologna	Livorno	Co-ownership, undisclosed
2007-07-01	Manolo Pestrin	Italy	Cesena	Messina	Undisclosed
2007-07-01	Michele Pazienza	Italy	Udinese	Fiorentina	€3.15M
2007-07-01	Mario Balotelli	Italy	Lumezzane	Internazionale	€0.34M
2007-07-01	Salvatore Bocchetti	Italy	Reggina	Cagliari	Co-ownership, undisclosed
2007-07-01	Matteo Prandelli	Italy	Montichiari	Siena	Undisclosed
2007-07-01	Paolo Campinoti	Italy	Internazionale	Spezia	Loan
2007-07-01	Alessio Lanotte	Italy	Internazionale	Spezia	Loan
2007-07-01	Francesco Volpe	Italy	Juventus	Ravenna	Co-ownership, €0.45M
2007-07-01	Giuseppe Sculli	Italy	Juventus	Genoa	€0.3M
2007-07-01	Andrea Rossi	Italy	Juventus	Siena	Co-ownership, €0.4M
2007-07-01	Andrea Gasbarroni	Italy	Juventus	Parma	€1.5M
2007-07-01	Douglas Packer	Brazil	Juventus	Siena	Co-ownership, €0.15M
2007-07-01	Igor Budan	Croatia	Palermo	Parma	Co-ownership, €1.25M
2007-07-02	Ivan Artipoli	Italy	Sampdoria	Prato	Co-ownership, €500
2007-07-02	Alessandro Volpe	Italy	Empoli	Olbia	Co-ownership, undisclosed
2007-07-02	Carlo Ferrario	Italy	Chievo	Prato	Co-ownership, undisclosed
2007-07-02	Renato Piovezan	Brazil	Chievo	Prato	Co-ownership, undisclosed
2007-07-02	Matteo Bonatti	Italy	Empoli	Massese	Co-ownership, undisclosed
2007-07-02	Gianni Fabiano	Italy	Carpenedolo	Parma	Undisclosed
2007-07-02	Andrea Bovo	Italy	Palermo	Padova	Co-ownership, €0.25M
2007-07-02	Manuel Pascali	Italy	Carpenedolo	Parma	Undisclosed
2007-07-02	Alessio Tombesi	Italy	Carpenedolo	Parma	Undisclosed
2007-07-02	Alessandro Wilson	Italy	Carpenedolo	Parma	Undisclosed
2007-07-02	Davide Chiumiento	Switzerland	Juventus	(Switzerland) Luzern	€0.15M
2007-07-02	Carmine Cucciniello	Italy	Avellino	Sampdoria	€0.235M
2007-07-03	Marco Martini	Pescara	Frosinone	Undisclosed	
2007-07-03	Mourad Meghni	Algeria	Bologna	Lazio	Co-ownership, €1.75M
2007-07-03	Aleksandar Kolarov	Serbia	(Serbia) OFK Beograd	Lazio	€0.952M
2007-07-03	Lionel Scaloni	Argentina	(Spain) Racing de Santander	Lazio	Free
2007-07-03	Riccardo Bonetto	Italy	Lazio	Bologna	Loan
2007-07-03	Daniele Gastaldello	Italy	Juventus	Sampdoria	€1.25M
2007-07-03	Paolo De Ceglie	Italy	Juventus	Siena	Co-ownership, €1.25M
2007-07-03	Omar Torri	Italy	Caravaggio (amateur)	AlbinoLeffe	Undisclosed
2007-07-03	Vito Falconieri	Italy	Brindisi (amateur)	Catania	
2007-07-03	Vito Falconieri	Italy	Catania	Gela	Loan
2007-07-03	Christian Iannelli	Italy	Catania	Gela	Loan
2007-07-03	Rosario Bucolo	Italy	Catania	Gela	Loan
2007-07-03	Basilio Monastra	Italy	Catania	Gela	Co-ownership, undisclosed
2007-07-03	Antonio Tedesco	Italy	Catania	Gela	Co-ownership, undisclosed
2007-07-04	Daniele Magliocchetti	Italy	Roma	Cagliari	Loan
2007-07-04	Matteo Rubin	Italy	Cittadella	Torino	Co-ownership, undisclosed
2007-07-04	Filippo Antonelli	Italy	Chievo	Triestina	Co-ownership, undisclosed
2007-07-04	Diego Oliveira	Brazil	Chievo	Cittadella	Loan
2007-07-04	David Silva Fernandes	Brazil	Chievo	Varese	Loan
2007-07-04	Valquinei de Jesus Santos	Brazil	Chievo	Varese	Loan
2007-07-04	Cesare Natali	Italy	Udinese	Torino	Undisclosed
2007-07-04	Reginaldo	Brazil	Fiorentina	Parma	€4.5M
2007-07-05	Francesco Cozza	Italy	Siena	Reggina	Undisclosed
2007-07-05	Alessandro Lucarelli	Italy	Reggina	Siena	Undisclosed
2007-07-05	Eros Pisano	Italy	Varese	Pisa	Co-ownership, undisclosed
2007-07-05	Alessandro Zoppetti	Italy	Pescara	Pisa	Undisclosed
2007-07-05	Christian Tiboni	Italy	Udinese (co-owned with Atalanta)	Pisa	Loan
2007-07-05	Massimo Gotti	Italy	Udinese	Padova	Loan
2007-07-05	Robson Toledo	Brazil	Udinese	Ravenna	Co-ownership, undisclosed
2007-07-05	Paolo Castellazzi	Italy	Sampdoria	Pro Patria	Loan
2007-07-05	Alessandro Romeo	Italy	Sampdoria	Legnano	Loan
2007-07-05	Giampaolo Calzi	Italy	Sampdoria	Ravenna	Co-ownership, €0.3M
2007-07-05	Francesco Virdis	Italy	Sampdoria	Ravenna	Loan
2007-07-05	Francesco Parravicini	Italy	Palermo (& Fiorentina)	Parma	€1.9M
2007-07-05	David Di Michele	Italy	Palermo	Torino	€3.5M
2007-07-05	Tibor Pleskan	Hungary	(Hungary) Dunakanyar-Vác (youth)	AlbinoLeffe (youth)	Undisclosed
2007-07-05	Gianluca Galasso	Italy	Roma	Bari	Co-ownership, €0.18M
2007-07-05	Andrea Giacomini	Italy	Roma (youth)	Vicenza	Loan
2007-07-05	Simone Palermo	Italy	Roma (youth)	Rimini (youth)	Loan
2007-07-05	Rej Volpato	Italy	Juventus	Empoli	Co-ownership, €500K
2007-07-05	Fabrizio Miccoli	Italy	Juventus	Palermo	€4.3M
2007-07-05	Natale Gonnella	Italy	Pescara	Grosseto	Undisclosed
2007-07-05	Christian Terlizzi	Italy	Sampdoria (& Palermo)	Catania	€1.5M
2007-07-05	Manuel Panini	Italy	Catania	Foggia	Loan
5 July 2007	Marco Borriello	Milan	Genoa	Co-ownership, €1.8M	
6 July 2007	Alfredo Cariello	Chievo	Frosinone	Co-ownership, €180,000 (swap with Troianiello)	
	Gennaro Troianiello	Frosinone	Chievo (remains at Frosinone, t)	Co-ownership, €180,000 (swap with Cariello)	
6 July 2007	Daniele Galloppa	Roma	Siena	Co-ownership, €1.1M	
6 July 2007	Gianluca Pegolo	Verona	Genoa	Free	
2007-07-06	Raffaele Nolè	Potenza	Rimini	Undisclosed	
2007-07-06	Simone Gozzi	Reggiana	Modena	Co-ownership, undisclosed	
2007-07-06	Giorgio Corona	Catania	Mantova	Undisclosed	
2007-07-06	Andrea Giallombardo	Livorno	Ascoli	Co-ownership, undisclosed	
2007-07-06	Federico Melchiorri	Siena (youth)	Sambenedettese	Co-ownership, undisclosed	
2007-07-06	Paulinho	Livorno	Grosseto	Loan	
2007-07-06	Alex Pederzoli	Juventus	Venezia	Free	
2007-07-06	Luca Ceccarelli	Cesena	Legnano	Loan	
2007-07-06	Daniele Gasparetto	Atalanta	Legnano	Loan	
2007-07-06	Leonardo Pettinari	Sangiovannese	Fiorentina	Co-ownership Resolution, €0.1M	
2007-07-06	Leonardo Pettinari	Fiorentina	Reggina	€0.3M	
2007-07-06	Andrea Gentile	Messina	Padova	Co-ownership, undisclosed	
2007-07-06	Devis Nossa	Internazionale	Pro Patria	Co-ownership, €500	
2007-07-06	Marco Filippini	Montichiari	Internazionale	Undisclosed	
2007-07-06	Luca Moscatiello	Internazionale	(England) Fulham	Undisclosed	
2007-07-06	Daniel Semenzato	Internazionale	Portogruaro	Co-ownership, undisclosed	
2007-07-06	Iacopo Balestri	Torino	Mantova	Undisclosed	
2007-07-06	Ivano Trotta	Napoli	Treviso	€0.5M	
2007-07-07	Ezequiel Lavezzi	(Argentina) San Lorenzo	Napoli	€5.625M	
2007-07-08	Xhulian Rrudho	Chievo	Sansovino	Co-ownership, undisclosed	
2007-07-08	Leonardo Moracci	Chievo	Sansovino	Loan	
2007-07-08	Marcus N'Ze	Chievo	Sansovino	Co-ownership, undisclosed	
	Luca Spinetti	Tivoli	Chievo	Free	
2007-07-08	Luca Spinetti	Chievo	Sansovino	Co-ownership, undisclosed	
2007-07-09	Papa Waigo (Senegal)	Cesena	Genoa	€5M	
2007-07-09	Fabio Catacchini	Pistoiese	Rimini	Undisclosed	
2007-07-09	Claudio Coralli	Empoli	Cittadella	Co-ownership, undisclosed	
2007-07-09	Alessandro Diamanti	Prato	Livorno	Undisclosed	
2007-07-10	Matteo Cavagna	Ravenna	Pro Sesto	Loan	
2007-07-10	Fabio Pecchia	Foggia	Frosinone	Undisclosed	
2007-07-10	Giuseppe Caccavallo	Lecce	Taranto	Loan	
2007-07-10	Cesare Bovo	Palermo	Genoa	Co-ownership, €2.85M	
2007-07-10	Renato Dossena	Empoli	Rovigo	Co-ownership, undisclosed	
2007-07-10	Pasquale Foggia	Lazio	Cagliari	Loan, €2.5M	
2007-07-11	Stefano Del Sante	Fiorentina	Varese	Loan	
2007-07-11	Christian Puggioni	Reggina	Perugia	Loan	
2007-07-11	Giovanni Martina	Treviso	Pizzighettone	Loan	
2008-07-11	Eros Bagnara	Treviso	Pizzighettone	Co-ownership, undisclosed	
2007-07-11	Danilo Russo	Genoa	Viareggio	Loan	
2007-07-11	Matteo Siligato	Genoa	Valenzana	Loan	
2007-07-11	Federico Ferrando	Genoa	Sangiovannese	Loan	
2007-07-11	Matías Claudio Cuffa (Argentina)	Chievo	Portogruaro	Undisclosed	
2007-07-11	Salvatore Giardina	Chievo	Portogruaro	Co-ownership, undisclosed	
2007-07-11	Pietro Zammuto	Juventus	Piacenza	Co-ownership, €0.17M	
2007-07-11	Sebastiano Girelli	Modena	Sassuolo	Co-ownership, undisclosed	
2007-07-11	William Jidayi	Modena	Sassuolo	Co-ownership, undisclosed	
12 July 2007	Salvatore Sirigu	Palermo	Cremonese	Loan	
2007-07-12	Ciro Danucci	Catania	Ternana	Co-ownership, undisclosed	
2007-07-12	Daniele Federici	Pro Sesto	Internazionale	Loan (between co-owner)	
2007-07-12	Nicola Barasso	Genoa	Taranto	Co-ownership, €0.15M	
2007-07-12	Viktor Budyanskiy (Russia)	Ascoli	Udinese	Undisclosed	
2007-07-12	Stefano Morrone	Livorno	Parma	Undisclosed	
13 July 2007	Simone Loria	Atalanta	Siena	€750,000	
2007-07-13	Mattia Ascani	Offida	Bologna	Undisclosed	
2007-07-13	Filippo Savi	Parma	Arezzo	Loan	
2007-07-13	Vincenzo Sicignano	Italy	Chievo	Frosinone	Loan
2007-07-13	Massimo Zappino	Brazil	Frosinone	Chievo	Loan
2007-07-13	Adrian Pit	Romania	(Switzerland) Bellinzona	Roma	Free
2007-07-13	Keivan Zarineh	Iran	Rieti	Roma	Free
2007-07-13	Matteo Trini	Italy	Juventus (youth)	Juve Stabia	Co-ownership, undisclosed
2007-07-13	Ivan Reali	Italy	Savio (youth)	Internazionale (youth)	Undisclosed
2007-07-13	Abdoulaye Diarra	Côte d'Ivoire	Internazionale (youth)	Cagliari	€60,000
2007-07-13	Alessio Cossu	Italy	Ravenna	Manfredonia	Co-ownership, undisclosed
2007-07-13	Tomás Guzmán	Paraguay	Juventus	Piacenza	Co-ownership, €0.45M
2007-07-13	Francesco Volpe	Italy	Ravenna	Livorno	€1M (co-owned with Juventus)
2007-07-13	Alfonso De Lucia	Italy	Parma	Livorno	Undisclosed
2007-07-13	Cristiano Lucarelli	Italy	Livorno	(Ukraine) Shakhtar Donetsk	Undisclosed
2007-07-14	Marco Piccinni	Italy	Bari (youth)	Noicattaro	Co-ownership, undisclosed
2007-07-14	Giorgio Lucenti	Italy	Catania	Mantova	Undisclosed
14 July 2007	Stefano Avogadri	Piacenza	Legnano	Loan	
14 July 2007	Elia Legati	Milan	Legnano	Loan	
2007-07-16	Daniele Marino	Italy	Internazionale	Gubbio	Loan
2007-07-16	Ronny Toma	Italy	Internazionale	Pergocrema	Loan
2007-07-16	Salvatore Mastronunzio	Italy	Frosinone	Ancona	Undisclosed
2007-07-16	Angelo Siniscalchi	Italy	Salernitana	Ascoli	Co-ownership, undisclosed
2007-07-16	Mirko Lamantia	Italy	Novara	Genoa	Co-ownership, €0.15M
16 July 2007	Giuseppe Scurto	Italy	Chievo	Treviso	Co-ownership, undisclosed
16 July 2007	Mariano González	Argentina	Palermo	(Portugal) Porto	Loan
17 July 2007	Alessandro Vinci	Italy	Empoli	Melfi	Co-ownership, undisclosed
2007-07-17	Alessandro Gambadori	Italy	Livorno	Pistoiese	Undisclosed
2007-07-17	Nico Pulzetti	Italy	Verona	Livorno	Undisclosed
2007-07-17	Jorge Andrade	Portugal	(Spain) Deportivo de La Coruña	Juventus	€10M
2007-07-17	Felice Evacuo	Italy	Avellino	Frosinone	Undisclosed
2007-07-18	Thomas Albanese	Italy	Siena	Ancona	Loan
2007-07-18	Nicola Campedelli	Italy	Modena	Cesena	Co-ownership, €650,000
2007-07-19	Diogo Tavares	Portugal	Genoa	(Switzerland) Lugano	Loan
2007-07-20	Luca Anania	Italy	Lecce	Pro Patria	Undisclosed
2007-07-20	Manuel Benetti	Italy	Sassuolo	Treviso	Undisclosed
2007-07-20	Manuel Benetti	Italy	Treviso	Bassano	Co-ownership, undisclosed
2007-07-20	Dario Biasi	Italy	Genoa	Cesena	€0.1M
2007-07-20	Luca Fiuzzi	Italy	Empoli	Reggiana	Loan
2007-07-20	Anderson	Brazil	Treviso	Reggiana	Undisclosed
2007-07-20	Marco Ambrosio	Italy	Brescia	Reggiana	Undisclosed
2007-07-20	Ferdinando Sforzini	Italy	Udinese	Vicenza	Loan
2007-07-20	Paolo Facchinetti	Italy	Genoa	Pro Sesto	Loan
2007-07-20	Rodrigue Boisfer	France	Genoa	Pro Sesto	Loan
2007-07-20	Michele Tarallo	Italy	Genoa	Monza	Loan
2007-07-20	Massimo Brambilla	Italy	Mantova	Monza	Undisclosed
2007-07-21	Juan Landaida	Argentina	Triestina	Benevento	Undisclosed
2007-07-21	Cristian Agnelli	Italy	Lecce	Benevento	Loan
2007-07-21	Riccardo Bolzan	Italy	Chievo	Lucchese	Loan
2010-07-23	Stefano Dicuonzo	Italy	Ravenna	Pro Patria	Loan
2007-07-23	Matteo Mandorlini	Italy	Parma	Pavia	Loan
2007-07-23	Ferdinando Vitofrancesco	Italy	Milan	Cremonese	Co-ownership, €5,000
2007-07-24	Walter Gargano	Uruguay	(Uruguay) Danubio	Napoli	€3.15M
2007-07-24	Giovanni Longobardi	Italy	Taranto	Catania	Undisclosed
2007-07-24	Giovanni Longobardi	Italy	Catania	Juve Stabia	Loan
25 July 2007	Daniele Degano	Italy	Piacenza	Messina	Free
2007-07-25	Antonino Saviano	Italy	Chievo	Sansovino	Co-ownership, undisclosed
2007-07-25	Maycol Andriani	Italy	Chievo	Sansovino	Co-ownership, undisclosed
2007-07-25	Danilo Soddimo	Italy	Sampdoria	Sambenedettese	Loan
2007-07-25	Fernando Forestieri	Italy	Genoa	Siena	Co-ownership, €1.7M (player exchange)
2007-07-25	André Cuneaz	Italy	Juventus	Cremonese	Co-ownership, undisclosed
2007-07-25	Felice Piccolo	Italy	Juventus	Empoli	Co-ownership, €0.125M
2007-07-25	Elvis Abbruscato	Italy	Torino	Lecce	Co-ownership, undisclosed
2007-07-25	Pasquale Schiattarella	Italy	Torino	Ancona	Co-ownership, undisclosed
2007-07-25	Claudio De Sousa	Italy	Torino	Ancona	Loan
2007-07-25	Mattia Masiero	Italy	Ancona	Torino	Co-ownership, undisclosed
2007-07-26	Loic Lumbilla Kandja	France	Internazionale	(Switzerland) Locarno	Loan
2007-07-26	Mauro Belotti	Italy	AlbinoLeffe	Pavia	Loan
2007-07-26	Jarkko Hurme	Finland	Udinese	Verona	Undisclosed
2007-07-27	Cristian Chivu	Romania	Roma	Internazionale	€16M
2007-07-27	Marco Andreolli	Italy	Internazionale	Roma	Co-ownership, €3M
2007-07-28	Stefano Fanucci	Italy	Livorno	Ancona	
2007-07-28	Matteo Scozzarella	Italy	Atalanta	Portogruaro	Co-ownership, undisclosed
2007-07-30	Luca Lacrimini	Italy	Napoli	Ancona	Loan
2007-07-30	Paolo Antonioli	Italy	Frosinone	Gallipoli	Undisclosed
2007-07-30	Domenico Germinale	Italy	Internazionale	Cittadella	Loan
2007-07-30	Simone Fautario	Italy	Internazionale	Pro Sesto	Loan
2007-07-30	Andrea Bavena	Italy	Internazionale (youth)	Pro Sesto (youth)	Loan
2007-07-30	Roberto De Filippis	Italy	Internazionale	Pro Sesto	?
2007-07-30	Matteo Marinoni	Italy	Internazionale	Pro Sesto	?
2007-07-31	Leonardo Colucci	Italy	Cagliari	Cremonese	Undisclosed
2007-07-31	Lamberto Zauli	Italy	Bologna	Cremonese	Undisclosed
2007-07-31	Daniele Greco	Italy	Lazio	Gallipoli	Loan
2007-07-31	Gabriele Graziani	Italy	Mantova	Cremonese	Undisclosed
2007-07-31	Matteo Merini	Italy	Lazio (youth)	Gallipoli	Loan
31 July 2007	Marco Bernacci	Italy	Mantova	Cesena	Co-ownership resolution, €1.4M
31 July 2007	Marco Bernacci	Italy	Cesena	Ascoli	Co-ownership, €1.55M

=== August ===
Date	Name	Moving from	Moving to	Fee
1 August 2007	Marco Mallus	Treviso	Reggiana	Co-ownership, €500
1 August 2007	Davide Caremi	AlbinoLeffe	Ancona	Loan
2 August 2007	Jorge Martínez	Montevideo Wanderers (Uruguay)	Catania	€3.2M
3 August 2007	Carlo Sciarrone	Udinese	Massese	Co-ownership, undisclosed
3 August 2007	Cristian Cesaretti	Empoli	Sangiovannese	Loan
3 August 2007	Jaroslav Šedivec	Crotone	Triestina	Co-ownership, €700,000
2007-08-04	Marco Murriero	Udinese	Martina	Undisclosed
2007-08-04	Ilario Lamberti	Martina	Udinese (youth)	Loan
2007-08-04	Giuliano Giannichedda	Juventus	Livorno	Free
2007-08-04	Andrea Capone	Cagliari	Vicenza	Undisclosed
4 August 2007	Fabrizio Grillo	Roma	Arezzo	Free
2007-08-05	Shadi Ghosheh	Messina	Igea Virtus	Loan
6 August 2007	Stefano Pietribiasi	Vicenza	Pavia	Loan
2007-08-07	Guilherme do Prado (Brazil)	Fiorentina	Spezia	Loan
7 August 2007	Simone Padoin	Vicenza	Atalanta	Co-ownership, €1.9M
7 August 2007	Davide Brivio	Atalanta	Vicenza	Co-ownership, €0.9M
8 August 2007	Dario D'Ambrosio	Fiorentina	Scafatese	Free
8 August 2007	Arturo Di Napoli	Messina	Siena	Undisclosed
8 August 2007	Enrico Fantini	Bologna	Modena	Undisclosed
9 August 2007	Francesco Zizzari	Spezia	Lucchese	Undisclosed
9 August 2007	Thierry Audel	Izola (Slovenia)	Triestina	€200,000
9 August 2007	Keivan Zarineh (Iran)	Roma	Cisco Roma	Loan
2007-08-09	Blažej Vaščák	Lecce	Cesena	Loan
2007-08-09	Rodrigo Defendi	(England) Tottenham Hotspur	Avellino	Undisclosed
10 August 2007	Andrea Mengoni	Chievo	Avellino	Loan
10 August 2007	Riccardo Taddei	Cremonese	Brescia	Undisclosed
10 August 2007	Andrea Ferretti	(Wales) Cardiff City	Cesena	Free
2007-08-10	Alessio Tacchinardi	Juventus	Brescia	Free
2007-08-10	Robert Trznadel	(Poland) Górnik Zabrze (youth)	Parma (youth)	Loan
10 August 2007	Davide Dionigi	Reggina	Taranto	
10 August 2007	Rafael Tesser	Lecce	Taranto	
10 August 2007	Domenico Di Cecco	Chievo	Avellino	Loan
2007-08-11	Umberto Improta	Triestina	South Tyrol	Undisclosed
2007-08-12	Gaetano Grieco	Napoli	Cavese	Loan
2007-08-13	Abel Aguilar (Colombia)	Udinese	(Spain) Xerez	Loan
13 August 2008	Arturo Di Napoli	Siena	Salernitana	Loan
2007-08-13	Michele Paolucci	Juventus	Udinese	Co-ownership, €1.355M
2007-08-13	Mauricio Isla (Chile)	(Chile) Universidad Católica	Udinese	Undisclosed
2007-08-13	Gaetano Vastola	Ascoli	Gallipoli	Free
13 August 2007	Andrea Ferrari	Atalanta	Monza	Loan
2007-08-14	Alessio Sestu	Treviso	Avellino	Loan
2007-08-14	Gleison Santos (Brazil)	AlbinoLeffe	Genoa	Co-ownership, €0.9M
2007-08-16	Francesco Acerbi	Pavia	Spezia	Loan
16 August 2007	Matteo Contini	Parma	Napoli	€3.2M
17 August 2007	Marco Di Fatta	Catania	Sansovino	Co-ownership, undisclosed
2007-08-17	Paolo Ponzo	Spezia	Reggiana	Undisclosed
2007-08-18	Riccardo Musetti	Treviso	Pro Sesto	Loan
2007-08-18	Gianluca Di Gennaro	Sampdoria	(Switzerland) Bellinzona	Loan
2007-08-18	Massimo Bonanni	Sampdoria	Bari	Loan
18 August 2007	Juanito Gómez Taleb	Triestina	Bellaria	Co-ownership, €500
18 August 2007	Carlo Gervasoni	Verona	AlbinoLeffe	Co-ownership, €560,000
20 August 2007	Giuseppe Rizza	Juventus	Juve Stabia	Co-ownership, undisclosed
2007-08-20	Mattia Masiero	Torino	Ancona	Loan (between co-owner)
2007-08-20	Radek Petr	(Czech Republic) Baník Ostrava	Parma	Undisclosed
20 August 2007	Samuele Beretta	Internazionale (youth)	Pro Sesto (youth)	Loan
20 August 2007	Nicolò De Cesare	Internazionale (youth)	Pro Sesto (youth)	Loan
20 August 2007	Giuseppe Greco	Genoa	Chievo	Loan
20 August 2007	Michele Bacis	Genoa	Cremonese	Undisclosed
20 August 2007	Mattia Evangelisti	Giulianova (youth)	Torino (youth)	Undisclosed
21 August 2007	Andrea De Falco	Chievo	Taranto	Co-ownership, undisclosed
21 August 2007	Nicola Redomi	Internazionale	Castelnuovo	Loan
21 August 2007	Mattia Marchesetti	Chievo	Vicenza	Co-ownership, €250,000
21 August 2007	Marcelo Zalayeta (Uruguay)	Juventus	Napoli	Co-ownership, €1.4M
21 August 2007	Manuele Blasi	Juventus	Napoli	Co-ownership, €2.45M
22 August 2007	Alessandro Lucarelli	Siena	Genoa	€1.9M
22 August 2007	Alessandro Bettega	Siena	Monza	Loan
22 August 2007	Daniele Cacia	Piacenza	Fiorentina (remained in Piacenza)	Co-ownership, €4.5M
24 August 2007	Cristiano Biraghi	Internazionale (youth)	Pro Sesto (youth)	Loan
24 August 2007	Giovanni Kyeremateng	Internazionale (youth)	Pro Sesto (youth)	Loan
24 August 2007	Marco Buonanno	Internazionale (youth)	Pro Sesto (youth)	Loan
24 August 2007	Davide Tremolada	Internazionale (youth)	Pro Sesto (youth)	Loan
24 August 2007	Alessandro Iacobucci	Curi Angolana (youth)	Mantova (youth)	Loan
24 August 2007	Gianluca Freddi	Roma (youth)	Grosseto	Co-ownership, €500
25 August 2007	Nicki Bille Nielsen	Reggina	Martina	Loan
25 August 2007	Ivan Castiglia	Reggina	Martina	Loan
27 August 2007	Antonio Bocchetti	Parma	Frosinone	Co-ownership, €450,000
27 August 2007	Davide Moscardelli	Rimini	Cesena	Co-ownership, €650,000
27 August 2007	Antonio Aquilanti	Pescara	Ascoli	Undisclosed
28 August 2007	Fernando Muslera	(Uruguay) Montevideo Wanderers	Lazio	€2.88m
9 August 2007	Antonio Giosa	Reggina	Messina	Loan
29 August 2007	Mike Tullberg	(Denmark) AGF	Reggina	Undisclosed
29 August 2007	Enrico Geroni	Prato	AlbinoLeffe	Undisclosed
29 August 2007	Luca Mondini	Spezia	Padova	Free
29 August 2007	Luisito Campisi	Atalanta	Massese	Co-ownership, undisclosed
30 August 2007	Davide Matteini	Palermo	Parma	Co-ownership, €0.9M
30 August 2007	William Pianu	Bari	Treviso	Undisclosed
30 August 2007	Gennaro Scarlato	Spezia	Frosinone	Undisclosed
30 August 2007	Dino Fava	Treviso	Bologna	Co-ownership, €900,000
30 August 2007	Gianpietro Zecchin	Padova	Grosseto	Co-ownership, undisclosed
30 August 2007	Bruno Fontes da Mota	Sampdoria (youth)	(Switzerland) Bellinzona	Loan
2007-08-31	Daniele Vantaggiato	Bari	Rimini	Co-ownership, undisclosed
2007-08-31	Antonio Marino	Folgore Selinunte	Udinese	Undisclosed
2007-08-31	Antimo Iunco	Verona	Chievo	Co-ownership, undisclosed
2007-08-31	Andrea Cocco	Cagliari	Pistoiese	Loan
2007–08-31	Adaílton	Genoa	Bologna	Undisclosed
2007-08-31	Daniele De Vezze	Messina	Livorno	Undisclosed
2007-08-31	Mario Donadoni	AlbinoLeffe	Padova	Undisclosed
2007-08-31	Massimiliano Pesenti	AlbinoLeffe	Canavese	Loan
2007-08-31	Lorenzo Pasciuti	Massese	AlbinoLeffe (youth)	Loan
2007-08-31	Raffaele Nolè	Rimini	Messina	Loan
31 August 2007	Zsolt Tamási	Cisco Roma (youth)	Udinese (youth)	Loan
31 August 2007	Domenico Maiese	Internazionale (youth)	Pro Sesto (youth)	Loan
31 August 2007	Marco Puntoriere	Internazionale (youth)	Pro Sesto (youth)	Loan
31 August 2007	Vito Di Bari	Frosinone	Taranto	Undisclosed
31 August 2007	Gianvito Plasmati	Catania	Foggia	Co-ownership, undisclosed
31 August 2007	Umberto Del Core	Catania	Foggia	Co-ownership, undisclosed
31 August 2007	Eder Baù	Spezia	Padova	Co-ownership, undisclosed
31 August 2007	Simone Groppi	Triestina	Foggia	Undisclosed
31 August 2007	Nicola Princivalli	Foggia	Triestina	Undisclosed
31 August 2007	Massimo Volta	Sampdoria	Foligno	Loan
31 August 2007	Bidre'ce Azor (Haiti)	Sampdoria (youth)	Teramo	Loan
31 August 2007	Ivan Artipoli	Prato	Lazio	€0.2M (co-owned with Sampdoria)
31 August 2007	Emmanuele Sembroni	Pescara (youth)	Sampdoria (youth)	Loan
31 August 2007	Simone Cavalli	Vicenza	Bari	Co-ownership, €500,000
4 September 2007	Ignazio Cocchiere	Internazionale (youth)	Pizzighettone	Free
2007-09-04	Ondřej Herzán	Lecce	Verona	Free
2007-09-05	Massimiliano Marsili	Roma	Taranto	Loan
2007-09-05	Federico Gerardi	Udinese	Monza	Loan
2007-09-05	Antonio Ghomsi (Cameroon)	Messina	Juve Stabia	Loan
2007-09-05	David Enrique Mateo	Fiorentina	Arezzo	Loan
2007-09-05	Fabio Ceccarelli	Treviso	Rovigo	Loan
2007-09-05	Massimiliano Fusani	Bari	Sassuolo	Loan
2007-09-05	Filippo Fedeli	Empoli	Ternana	Undisclosed
2007-09-06	Fabio Vignaroli	Bari	Lazio	Free
2007-09-08	Tommaso Romito	Napoli	Pescara	Loan
2007-09-08	Alessandro Boccolini	Ascoli	Ivrea	
2007-09-14	Christian Conti	Bari	Pescara	Loan
2007-09-14	Marco Sansovini	Bari	Pescara	Loan

== Temp ==
2007-05-08	Davide Desideri	Italy	Sambenedettese	Bari	Undisclosed
2007-05-24	Antonio Candreva	Italy	Ternana	Udinese	Undisclosed
2007-05-31	Giulio Migliaccio	Italy	Atalanta	Palermo	Undisclosed
2007-06-05	Aleksandar Luković	Serbia	(Serbia) Red Star Belgrade	Udinese	Undisclosed
2007-06-07	Alberto Gerbo	Italy	Giaveno	Internazionale	Undisclosed
2007-06-08	Samir Ujkani	Albania	(Belgium) Anderlecht	Palermo	Undisclosed
2007-06-09	Ianis Zicu	Romania	Internazionale	(Romania) Dinamo București	Undisclosed
2007-06-09	Valentin Năstase	Romania	Ascoli	(Romania) Dinamo București	Undisclosed
2007-06-11	Alessandro Matri	Italy	Milan	Cagliari	Co-ownership, undisclosed
2007-06-13	Dimitrios Eleftheropoulos	Greece	Ascoli	Siena	Free
2007-06-14	Ibrahim Ba	France	Unattached	Milan	Free
2007-06-14	Fabio Bazzani	Italy	Sampdoria	Brescia	Free
2007-06-15	Federico Groppioni	Italy	Rieti	Bari	Undisclosed
2007-06-18	Vaggelis Moras	Greece	(Greece) AEK Athens	Bologna	Free
2007-06-19	Giulio Falcone	Italy	Sampdoria	Parma	Free
2007-06-19	Marc Pfertzel	France	Livorno	(Germany) Bochum	€0.5m
2007-06-20	Vincenzo Marruocco	Italy	Foggia	Cagliari	Undisclosed
2007-06-20	Simone Del Nero	Italy	Brescia	Lazio	Free
2007-06-20	Robert Kovač	Croatia	Juventus	(Germany) Borussia Dortmund	Free
2007-06-20	Dominique Malonga	France	(France) AS Monaco	Torino	Undisclosed
2007-06-21	Zlatan Muslimović	Bosnia and Herzegovina	Udinese	Atalanta	Undisclosed
2007-06-21	Csaba Preklet	Hungary	(Hungary) Győri ETO	Reggina	Undisclosed
2007-06-21	Adam Gergely Kovacsik	Hungary	(Hungary) Ferencvárosi	Reggina	Undisclosed
2007-06-22	Luca Antonelli	Italy	Milan	Bari	Loan
2007-06-26	Francesco D'Angelo	Italy	Rende	Internazionale	Loan
2007-06-26	Salvatore Papa	Italy	Rende	Internazionale	Loan
2007-06-26	David Suazo	Honduras	Cagliari	Internazionale	Undisclosed
2007-06-26	Saša Bjelanović	Croatia	Ascoli	Torino	Co-ownership, undisclosed
2007-06-27	Riccardo Maniero	Italy	Juventus	Ascoli	Loan
2007-06-27	Davide Lanzafame	Italy	Juventus	Bari	Loan
2007-06-27	Davide Di Gennaro	Italy	Milan	Bologna	Loan
2007-06-27	Massimiliano Scaglia	Italy	Bari	Treviso	Undisclosed
2007-06-27	Federico Piovaccari	Italy	Internazionale	Treviso	Co-ownership, undisclosed
2007-06-28	Mitja Novinič	Slovenia	(Slovenia) Nafta Lendava	Milan	Undisclosed
2007-06-28	Ricardo Esteves	Portugal	Reggina	(Portugal) Marítimo	Free
2007-06-28	Alessandro Ligi	Italy	San Marino	Cesena	Undisclosed
2007-06-29	Ferdinando Coppola	Italy	Milan	Atalanta	Loan
2007-06-29	Andrea Parola	Italy	Sampdoria	Cagliari	Undisclosed
2007-06-29	Luca D'Errico	Italy	Pavia	Internazionale	Undisclosed
2007-06-29	Diego Falcinelli	Italy	Pontevecchio	Internazionale	Loan
2007-06-29	Antonio Chimenti	Italy	Cagliari	Udinese	Free
2007-06-29	Antonio Floro Flores	Italy	Arezzo	Udinese	Co-ownership, undisclosed
2007-06-29	Anej Lovrečič	Slovenia	(Slovenia) Koper	Lecce	Undisclosed
2007-06-29	Tony Sergeant	Belgium	(Belgium) Zulte Waregem	Bari	Undisclosed
2007-07-01	Luca Toni	Italy	Fiorentina	(Germany) Bayern Munich	€11m
2007-07-01	Arturo Lupoli	Italy	(England) Arsenal	Fiorentina	Free
2007-07-01	Ibrahima Camara	Guinea	Parma	(France) Le Mans	Undisclosed
2007-07-01	Marco Zoro	Ivory Coast	Messina	(Portugal) Benfica	Free
2007-07-01	Miguel Garcia	Portugal	(Portugal) Sporting	Reggina	Free
2007-07-01	Joelson	Brazil	AlbinoLeffe	Reggina	Free
2007-07-01	Stefano Lucchini	Italy	Empoli	Sampdoria	Free
2007-07-02	Nicola Ventola	Italy	Atalanta	Torino	Free
2007-07-02	Christian Maggio	Italy	Fiorentina	Sampdoria	Co-ownership, undisclosed
2007-07-02	Bartosz Salamon	Poland	(Poland) Lech Poznań	Brescia	Undisclosed
2007-07-03	Federico Coppiardi	Italy	Mantova	Milan	Loan
2007-07-03	Emmanuel Cascione	Italy	Rimini	Reggina	Undisclosed
2007-07-03	Lorenzo Collacchioni	Italy	Pistoiese	Reggina	Undisclosed
2007-07-03	Antonio Mirante	Italy	Juventus	Sampdoria	Loan
2007-07-03	Simone Ghezzi	Italy	Brescia	AlbinoLeffe	Loan
2007-07-03	Gianluca Berti	Italy	Sampdoria	Cesena	Free
2007-07-03	Andrea Ardito	Italy	Torino	Lecce	Undisclosed
2007-07-03	Simone Calori	Italy	Pisa	Mantova	Undisclosed
2007-07-03	Jasmin Handanovič	Slovenia	(Slovenia) Koper	Mantova	Undisclosed
2007-07-03	David Giubilato	Italy	Napoli	Vicenza	Undisclosed
2007-07-04	Diego De Ascentis	Italy	Torino	Atalanta	Undisclosed
2007-07-04	Robert Acquafresca	Italy	Internazionale	Cagliari	Co-ownership, undisclosed
2007-07-04	Ivan Fatić	Montenegro	Chievo	Internazionale	Co-ownership, undisclosed
2007-07-04	Nicolò Cherubin	Italy	Cittadella	Reggina	Undisclosed
2007-07-04	Hugo Campagnaro	Argentina	Piacenza	Sampdoria	Undisclosed
2007-07-04	Matteo Sereni	Italy	Lazio	Torino	Free
2007-07-04	Gökhan Inler	Switzerland	(Switzerland) Zürich	Udinese	Undisclosed
2007-07-04	Giancarlo Petrocco	Italy	Paganese	Messina	Undisclosed
2007-07-04	Vlado Šmit	Serbia	Bologna	Treviso	Undisclosed
2007-07-04	Luigi Piangerelli	Italy	Brescia	Triestina	Undisclosed
2007-07-04	Matteo Serafini	Italy	Brescia	Vicenza	Undisclosed
2007-07-05	Michele Mignani	Italy	Triestina	Grosseto	Undisclosed
2007-07-05	Mauro Esposito	Italy	Cagliari	Roma	co-ownership, €2m
2007-07-05	Michele Fini	Italy	Ascoli	Cagliari	Free
2007-07-05	Ahmed Barusso	Ghana	Rimini	Roma	co-ownership, €1.7m
2007-07-05	Albano Bizarri	Argentina	(Spain) Gimnàstic	Catania	Undisclosed
2007-07-05	Viro Falconieri	Italy	Brindisi	Catania	Undisclosed
2007-07-05	Marcello Gazzola	Italy	Sassari Torres	Catania	Undisclosed
2007-07-05	Sebastian Giovinco	Italy	Juventus	Empoli	Loan
2007-07-05	Caetano	Brazil	(Brazil) Ipatinga	Fiorentina	Free
2007-07-05	Caetano	Brazil	Fiorentina	Siena	Co-ownership, undisclosed
2007-07-05	Ricardo Matias Verón	Argentina	Reggina	Siena	Co-ownership, undisclosed
2007-07-05	Francesco Lodi	Italy	Empoli	Frosinone	Co-ownership, undisclosed
2007-07-05	Marco Carparelli	Italy	Cremonese	Grosseto	Undisclosed
2007-07-05	Stefano Dall'Acqua	Italy	Treviso	Grosseto	Loan
2007-07-05	Gianni Munari	Italy	Palermo	Lecce	Co-ownership, undisclosed
2007-07-05	Daniele Buzzegoli	Italy	Empoli	Pisa	Co-ownership, undisclosed
2007-07-05	Giuseppe Casisa	Italy	Gallipoli	Pisa	Undisclosed
2007-07-05	José Ignacio Castillo	Argentina	Frosinone	Pisa	Undisclosed
2007-07-05	Gianmarco Canova	Italy	Bologna	Ravenna	Undisclosed
2007-07-05	Marco Cavina	Italy	Bologna	Ravenna	Undisclosed
2007-07-05	Francesco La Rosa	Italy	Taranto	Ravenna	Undisclosed
2007-07-05	Emanuele Terranova	Italy	Palermo	Vicenza	Loan
2007-07-06	Anthony Vanden Borre	Belgium	(Belgium) Anderlecht	Fiorentina	Undisclosed
2007-07-06	Vikash Dhorasoo	France	Unattached	Livorno	Free
2007-07-06	Salvatore Foti	Italy	Udinese	Sampdoria	Loan
2007-07-06	Daniele Ficagna	Italy	Cesena	Siena	Undisclosed
2007-07-06	Mirko Guadalupi	Italy	Perugia	Siena	Loan
2007-07-06	Filippo Porcari	Italy	Milan	Avellino	Loan
2007-07-06	Walter Bressan	Italy	Arezzo	Grosseto	Loan
2007-07-06	Luca Giunchi	Italy	Milan	Grosseto	Undisclosed
2007-07-06	Fabio Visone	Italy	Sambenedettese	Grosseto	Undisclosed
2007-07-06	Alessandro Carrozza	Italy	Gallipoli	Pisa	Undisclosed
2007-07-06	Alessandro Lorello	Italy	Alghero	Pisa	Undisclosed
2007-07-06	Davide Morello	Italy	Ancona	Pisa	Undisclosed
2007-07-06	Matteo Centurioni	Italy	Modena	Ravenna	Undisclosed
2007-07-06	Stefano Ferrario	Italy	Ternana	Ravenna	Co-ownership, undisclosed
2007-07-06	Mohamed Fofana	France	Cittadella	Ravenna	Co-ownership, undisclosed
2007-07-06	Giuseppe Savelli	Italy	Ternana	Ravenna	Undisclosed
2007-07-06	Sorin Paraschiv	Romania	(Romania) Steaua București	Rimini	€0.5m
2007-07-06	Michele Rinaldi	Italy	Udinese	Rimini	Loan
2007-07-06	Giovanni Fietta	Italy	Treviso	Spezia	Loan
2007-07-06	Marco Zaninelli	Italy	Treviso	Spezia	Loan
2007-07-06	Francesco Cairo	Italy	Mariano Keller	Triestina	Loan
2007-07-06	Elia Giansante	Italy	Viterbese	Triestina	Undisclosed
2007-07-06	Patrick Kalambay	Italy	Milan	Triestina	Loan
2007-07-06	Francesco Ciro Lucarelli	Italy	Mariano Keller	Triestina	Loan
2007-07-06	Andrea Peana	Italy	Cagliari	Triestina	Loan
2007-07-06	Emanuele Pesaresi	Italy	Chievo	Triestina	Undisclosed
2007-07-06	Davide Rovella	Italy	Aglianese	Triestina	Undisclosed
2007-07-06	Valerio Volpecina	Italy	Mariano Keller	Triestina	Loan
2007-07-06	Federico Gabrieli	Italy	Padova	Vicenza	Loan
2007-07-06	Daniele Padelli	Italy	Sampdoria	Pisa	Loan
2007-07-06	Piermario Morosini	Italy	Udinese	Vicenza	Loan
2007-07-06	Ricardo Faty	Senegal	Roma	(Germany) Leverkusen	Loan
2007-07-07	Fabio Grosso	Italy	Internazionale	(France) Lyon	€7m
2007-07-09	Alessandro Di Maio	Italy	Genoa	(Switzerland) Lugano	Unknown
2007-07-09	Tiago	Portugal	Genoa	(Switzerland) Lugano	Unknown
2007-07-10	Antonio Langella	Italy	Cagliari	Atalanta	Undisclosed
2007-07-10	Antonino D'Agostino	Italy	Atalanta	Cagliari	Loan
2007-07-10	Reto Ziegler	Switzerland	(England) Tottenham Hotspur	Sampdoria	Undisclosed
2007-07-10	Simon Laner	Italy	Sanremese	AlbinoLeffe	Undisclosed
2007-07-10	Alessandro Cattelan	Italy	Milan	Mantova	Loan
2007-07-10	Alberto Creati	Italy	Renato Curi Angolana	Mantova	Undisclosed
2007-07-10	Alessio Manzoni	Italy	Atalanta	Spezia	Loan
2007-07-11	Jess Vanstrattan	Australia	Verona	Juventus	Undisclosed
2007-07-11	Leandro Grimi	Argentina	Milan	Siena	Loan
2007-07-11	Vittorio Micolucci	Italy	Udinese	Ascoli	Co-ownership, undisclosed
2007-07-11	Alberto Quadri	Italy	Lazio	Avellino	Loan
2007-07-11	Daniel Wolf	Austria	Pistoiese	Piacenza	Undisclosed
2007-07-11	Dario Baccin	Italy	Rimini	Treviso	Undisclosed
2007-07-12	Rijat Shala	Switzerland	Salernitana	Cagliari	Undisclosed
2007-07-12	Alfonso Camorani	Italy	Treviso	Spezia	Loan
2007-07-12	Andrea Milani	Italy	Cittadella	Triestina	Co-ownership, undisclosed
2007-07-12	Alessandro Gherardi	Italy	Fiorentina	(Switzerland) Bellinzona	Unknown
2007-07-13	Pablo Álvarez	Uruguay	(Uruguay) Nacional	Reggina	Undisclosed
2007-07-13	José Montiel	Paraguay	Udinese	Reggina	Co-ownership, undisclosed
2007-07-13	Giandomenico Mesto	Italy	Reggina	Udinese	Loan
2007-07-13	Massimo Taibi	Italy	Torino	Ascoli	Undisclosed
2007-07-13	Raffaele Bianco	Italy	Juventus	Piacenza	Loan
2007-07-13	Giuseppe Gemiti	Germany	Modena	Piacenza	Loan
2007-07-13	Gaël Genevier	Italy	Sangiovannese	Pisa	Undisclosed
2007-07-13	Matteo Pivotto	Italy	Triestina	Ravenna	Undisclosed
2007-07-13	Davide Saverino	Italy	Spezia	Treviso	Undisclosed
2007-07-13	Rolando Bianchi	Italy	Reggina	(England) Manchester City	£8.8m
2007-07-14	Ciro Immobile	Italy	Sorrento	Juventus	Undisclosed
2007-07-14	Cristiano Novembre	Italy	Fano	Juventus	Undisclosed
2007-07-14	Mirko Eramo	Italy	Bari	Sampdoria	Co-ownership, undisclosed
2007-07-14	Vincenzo Montella	Italy	Roma	Sampdoria	Loan
2007-07-16	Matteo Gorelli	Italy	Porta Nuova Grosseto	Livorno	Undisclosed
2007-07-16	Michele Arcari	Italy	Pro Patria	Brescia	Undisclosed
2007-07-16	Róbert Feczesin	Hungary	(Hungary) Sopron	Brescia	Undisclosed
2007-07-16	Ádám Vass	Hungary	(England) Stoke City	Brescia	Free
2007-07-16	Roberto Cortellini	Italy	Brescia	Cesena	Co-ownership, undisclosed
2007-07-16	Alessandro Ferri	Italy	Verona	Mantova	Undisclosed
2007-07-16	Jean Romaric Kevin Koffi	Ivory Coast	Virtus Castelfranco	Modena	Undisclosed
2007-07-16	Stefano Lombardi	Italy	Ascoli	Modena	Undisclosed
2007-07-16	Claudio Pani	Italy	Cagliari	Modena	Loan
2007-07-16	Stefano Okaka Chuka	Italy	Roma	Modena	Loan
2007-07-16	Davide Saverino	Italy	Treviso	Spezia	Loan
2007-07-16	Tijani Belaid	Tunisia	Internazionale	(Czech Republic) Slavia Praha	Loan
2007-07-16	Christian Abbiati	Italy	Milan	(Spain) Atlético Madrid	Loan
2007-07-16	Morgan De Sanctis	Italy	Udinese	(Spain) Sevilla	Free
2007-07-17	Cristian Ezequiel Llama	Argentina	(Argentina) Arsenal	Catania	Undisclosed
2007-07-17	Rincón	Brazil	Internazionale	Empoli	Loan
2007-07-17	Luis Jiménez	Chile	Ternana	Internazionale	Loan
2007-07-17	Stefano Alba	Italy	LiventinaGorghense	Juventus	Undisclosed
2007-07-17	Daniele Bompan	Italy	Focene	Juventus	Undisclosed
2007-07-17	Marco Bonassi	Italy	Pro Vercelli	Juventus	Undisclosed
2007-07-17	Mariano Donda	Argentina	(Argentina) Nueva Chicago	Bari	Undisclosed
2007-07-17	Stefano Botta	Italy	Genoa	Cesena	Loan
2007-07-17	Davide Succi	Italy	Chievo	Ravenna	Undisclosed
2007-07-17	Andrea Consigli	Italy	Atalanta	Rimini	Loan
2007-07-17	Alessandro Dal Canto	Italy	AlbinoLeffe	Treviso	Undisclosed
2007-07-17	Andrea Russotto	Italy	(Switzerland) Bellinzona	Treviso	Loan
2007-07-17	Marco Benvenuto	Italy	Südtirol	Triestina	Undisclosed
2007-07-17	Alessandro Sgrigna	Italy	Vicenza	Triestina	Loan
2007-07-18	Sergio Floccari	Italy	Messina	Atalanta	Undisclosed
2007-07-18	Daniele Pedrelli	Italy	Spezia	Internazionale	Undisclosed
2007-07-18	Nelson Rivas	Colombia	(Argentina) River Plate	Internazionale	Undisclosed
2007-07-18	Stefano Crisci	Italy	Pro Vasto	Parma	Loan
2007-07-18	Cristoforo Correale	Italy	Monterotondo	Udinese	Undisclosed
2007-07-18	Davide Bombardini	Italy	Atalanta	Bologna	Undisclosed
2007-07-18	Davide Carrus	Italy	Bari	Bologna	Undisclosed
2007-07-18	Zsolt Bognár	Hungary	(Hungary) Ferencvárosi	Frosinone	Undisclosed
2007-07-18	Alessio Cerci	Italy	Roma	Pisa	Loan
2007-07-18	Luca Ceccarelli	Italy	Internazionale	Spezia	Loan
2007-07-19	Edgar Barreto	Paraguay	(Netherlands) NEC	Reggina	Undisclosed
2007-07-19	Salvatore Lanna	Italy	Chievo	Torino	Free
2007-07-19	Luigi Lavecchia	Italy	Messina	Bologna	Undisclosed
2007-07-20	Franco Semioli	Italy	Chievo	Fiorentina	€5.5m
2007-07-20	Andrea Morbi	Italy	Aldini Bariviera	Internazionale	Loan
2007-07-20	Amedeo Fabio Caiazzo	Italy	Rivoli	Juventus	Undisclosed
2007-07-20	Mirko Lucchesi	Italy	Margine Coperta	Siena	Loan
2007-07-20	Gabriele Aldegani	Italy	Bari	Avellino	Undisclosed
2007-07-20	Dario Biasi	Italy	Genoa	Cesena	Undisclosed
2007-07-20	Gianmarco Scacchetti	Italy	Diana Nemi	Frosinone	Undisclosed
2007-07-20	Isah Eliakwu	Nigeria	Triestina	Spezia	Loan
2007-07-20	Dario Venitucci	Italy	Juventus	Treviso	Loan
2007-07-20	Murilo Maccari	Brazil	Reggina	(Brazil) Figueirense	Undisclosed
2007-07-21	Ludovic Giuly	France	(Spain) Barcelona	Roma	€3.2m
2007-07-21	Andrea Argnani	Italy	Faenza	Mantova	Loan
2007-07-21	Stefano Portesi	Italy	Castellana	Mantova	Loan
2007-07-21	Domenico Giampà	Italy	Ascoli	Modena	Undisclosed
2007-07-21	Fabio Borriello	Italy	Milan	(Switzerland) Lugano	Unknown
2007-07-23	Antonio Schetter	Italy	Cavese	Messina	Loan
2007-07-23	Vitali Kutuzov	Belarus	Parma	Pisa	Loan
2007-07-23	Fabio Buscaroli	Italy	Lumezzane	Ravenna	Loan
2007-07-24	Guillermo Giacomazzi	Uruguay	Lecce	Empoli	Loan
2007-07-24	Alessandro Salvi	Italy	Trealbe	AlbinoLeffe	Undisclosed
2007-07-24	Giuseppe Abruzzese	Italy	Lecce	Grosseto	Undisclosed
2007-07-24	Andrea Lazzari	Italy	Atalanta	Grosseto	Loan
2007-07-24	Andrea Pinzan	Italy	Perugia	Grosseto	Undisclosed
2007-07-24	Valerio Virga	Italy	Roma	Grosseto	Loan
2007-07-24	Mariano Stendardo	Italy	Atalanta	Messina	Undisclosed
2007-07-25	Claudio Marchisio	Italy	Juventus	Empoli	Loan
2007-07-25	Christian Vieri	Italy	Atalanta	Fiorentina	Free
2007-07-25	Diego Tristán	Spain	(Spain) Mallorca	Livorno	Free
2007-07-25	Roberto Maurantonio	Italy	Lanciano	Piacenza	Undisclosed
2007-07-25	Francesco Cosenza	Italy	Reggina	Ravenna	Loan
2007-07-25	Federico Pace	Italy	Roma	Spezia	Undisclosed
2007-07-25	Walter Carta	Italy	Ars et Labor	Juventus	Loan
2007-07-26	Cristian Cristea	Romania	(France) Le Mans	Cesena	Undisclosed
2007-07-26	Nicolás Amodio	Uruguay	Napoli	Treviso	Loan
2007-07-26	Massimo Coda	Italy	(Switzerland) Bellinzona	Treviso	Undisclosed
2007-07-27	Filippo Noventa	Italy	Aldini Bariviera	Milan	Undisclosed
2007-07-27	Carlo Marco Piazza	Italy	Aldini Bariviera	Milan	Loan
2007-07-27	Alessandro Bettega	Italy	Juventus	Siena	Undisclosed
2007-07-27	Francesco Mignogna	Italy	Treviso	Grosseto	Undisclosed
2007-07-27	Carlo Coppari	Italy	?	Mantova	Undisclosed
2007-07-27	Mimmo Esposito	Italy	Francavilla	Vicenza	Undisclosed
2007-07-28	Orlando Urbano	Italy	Juventus	Potenza	Free
2007-07-28	Francesco Galeoto	Italy	Genoa	Messina	Undisclosed
2007-07-28	Pablo Granoche	Uruguay	(Uruguay) Fénix	Triestina	Undisclosed
2007-07-28	Luca Mezzano	Italy	Treviso	Triestina	Loan
2007-07-30	Domenico Pacilio	Italy	Aldini Bariviera	Milan	Undisclosed
2007-07-30	Krisztián Kenesei	Hungary	(Hungary) Vasas	Avellino	Undisclosed
2007-07-30	Riccardo Capogna	Italy	Lazio	(Switzerland) Chiasso	Loan
2007-07-30	Rivaldo González	Paraguay	Genoa	(Switzerland) Lugano	Unknown
2007-07-31	Michal Miskiewicz	Poland	(Poland) Kmita Zabierzów	Milan	Undisclosed
2007-07-31	Nicolò Motta	Italy	Monza	Milan	Undisclosed
2007-07-31	Gioele Passoni	Italy	Monza	Milan	Undisclosed
2007-07-31	Nicolás Suárez Bremec	Spain	Arezzo	Ascoli	Undisclosed
2007-07-31	Alessandro Conticchio	Italy	Cagliari	Avellino	Undisclosed
2007-07-31	Flavio Lazzari	Italy	Udinese	Messina	Loan
2007-07-31	Graziano Pellè	Italy	Lecce	(Netherlands) AZ	Undisclosed
2007-07-31	Henok Goitom	Sweden	Udinese	(Spain) Real Murcia	Undisclosed
2007-07-31	Ricardo Oliveira	Brazil	Milan	(Spain) Zaragoza	Loan
2007-08-01	Mirco Antenucci	Italy	Giulianova	Catania	Undisclosed
2007-08-01	Emil Hallfreðsson	Iceland	(Norway) Lyn	Reggina	Undisclosed
2007-08-01	Francesco Carbone	Italy	Chievo	Avellino	Co-ownership, undisclosed
2007-08-01	Maurizio Ciaramitaro	Italy	Palermo	Chievo	Loan
2007-08-01	Fabio Da Ros	Italy	LiventinaGorghense	Chievo	Undisclosed
2007-08-01	Marco Negrello	Italy	Montichiari	Piacenza	Loan
2007-08-01	Alex Calderoni	Italy	Atalanta	Treviso	Undisclosed
2007-08-02	Aleksandar Prijović	Serbia	(Switzerland) St. Gallen	Parma	Undisclosed
2007-08-02	Valerio Risi		Cavese	Avellino	Undisclosed
2007-08-02	Loris Formuso		Taranto	Lecce	Loan
2007-08-02	Valerio Anastasi		Montichiari	Mantova	Undisclosed
2007-08-02	Alfredo Napolano	Italy	Montichiari	Mantova	Undisclosed
2007-08-02	Gal Simič	Slovenia	(Slovenia) Interblock	Spezia	Undisclosed
2007-08-03	Massimo Melucci	Italy	Venezia	Ascoli	Undisclosed
2007-08-03	Marco Stella	Italy	Piacenza	Avellino	Undisclosed
2007-08-03	Santiago Ladino	Argentina	(Spain) Lorca Deportiva CF	Bari	Undisclosed
2007-08-03	Jonathan Biabiany	France	Internazionale	Chievo	Loan
2007-08-03	Stefano Lorenzi	Italy	Treviso	Pisa	Loan
2007-08-03	Marco Ortolan	Italy	Union CSV	Vicenza	Loan
2007-08-03	Valeri Bojinov	Bulgaria	Fiorentina	(England) Manchester City	€8m
2007-08-06	Luigi Apicella	Italy	Arezzo	Bari	Undisclosed
2007-08-06	Saverio Pio D'Amore	Italy	Lucera	Bari	Undisclosed
2007-08-06	Trifone Iacobellis	Italy	Liberty Bari	Bari	Undisclosed
2007-08-06	Marco Milella	Italy	Giugliano	Bari	Loan
2007-08-06	Andre Mollestam	Sweden	(Sweden) Brommapojkarna	Lecce	Undisclosed
2007-08-07	Manuel Caponi	Italy	Prato	Empoli	Undisclosed
2007-08-07	Nicola Pavarini	Italy	Siena	Parma	Undisclosed
2007-08-07	Carlos Adrián Valdez	Uruguay	(Uruguay) Nacional	Reggina	Undisclosed
2007-08-07	Kewullay Conteh	Sierra Leone	Palermo	AlbinoLeffe	Free
2007-08-07	Daniele Amerini	Italy	Reggina	Frosinone	Free
2007-08-07	Andrea Deskovic		San Luigi	Triestina	Undisclosed
2007-08-07	Andrea Gossi		S.S. Giovanni	Triestina	Undisclosed
2007-08-08	Paolo Barzaghi	Italy	Tritium	Atalanta	Undisclosed
2007-08-09	João Paulo Fernando Marangon	Brazil	(Brazil)	Roma	Undisclosed
2007-08-10	Gionata Mingozzi	Italy	Sampdoria	Treviso	Loan
2007-08-10	Jan Koprivec	Slovenia	(Slovenia) Koper	Cagliari	Undisclosed
2007-08-14	George Forsyth	Peru	(Peru) Alianza Lima	Atalanta	Undisclosed
2007-08-14	Damiano Zenoni	Italy	Udinese	Parma	Undisclosed, player exchange
2007-08-14	Damiano Ferronetti	Italy	Parma	Udinese	Undisclosed, player exchange
2007-08-14	Leonardo Talamonti	Argentina	(Argentina) River Plate	Atalanta	Loan
2007-08-16	Pablo Pallante	Uruguay	(Uruguay) Cerro	Grosseto	Loan
2007-08-21	Stefano Olivieri	Italy	Chievo	Ancona	Loan
2007-08-21	Lorenzo Farinelli	Italy	Triestina	Vibonese	Loan
2007-08-22	Fabián Carini	Uruguay	Internazionale	(Spain) Real Murcia	Free
2007-08-22	Alessandro Pellicori	Italy	Cesena	Avellino	Co-ownership, undisclosed
2007-08-23	Marco Storari	Italy	Milan	(Spain) Levante	Loan
2007-08-26	Stefano Argilli	Italy	Frosinone	Cremonese	Undisclosed
2007-08-27	Maximilano Ré	Argentina	(Argentina) Rosario Central	Siena	Undisclosed
2007-08-29	Costinha	Portugal	(Spain) Atlético Madrid	Atalanta	Free
2007-08-30	Palmiro Di Dio	Italy	Ternana	Bari	Loan
2007-08-30	Sébastien Piocelle	France	Crotone	Grosseto	Undisclosed
2007-08-30	Ernesto Terra	Italy	Arezzo	Grosseto	Loan
2007-08-31	Manuel Belleri	Italy	Lazio	Atalanta	Loan
2007-08-31	Mario Salgado	Chile	Foggia	Avellino	Co-ownership, undisclosed
2007-08-31	Sebastián Ribas	Uruguay	Internazionale	Spezia	Loan
2007-08-31	Andrea Mei	Italy	Internazionale	Chievo	Loan
2007-08-31	Giuseppe Cozzolino	Italy	Lecce	Cremonese	Undisclosed
2007-08-31	Mirco Gasparetto	Italy	Genoa	Chievo	Undisclosed
2007-08-31	Daniele Croce	Italy	Arezzo	Cesena	Loan
2007-08-31	Giovanni La Camera	Italy	Padova	Rimini	Co-ownership, undisclosed
	Vedin Musić	Bosnia and Herzegovina	Torino	Padova	Undisclosed
	Marcus Diniz	Brazil	Milan	Monza	Loan
	Sandro Bloudek	Slovenia	Milan	Lecco	Loan
	Claudio Scarzanella	Italy	Juventus	Ternana	Undisclosed
	Ivica Iliev	Serbia	Messina	(Greece) PAOK	Undisclosed
	Luigi Vitale	Italy	Napoli	Lanciano	Unknown
	Landry Bonnefoi	France	Juventus	(France) Dijon FCO	Undisclosed
	Luca Santonocito	Italy	Internazionale	(Scotland) Celtic	Undisclosed
	Simon Laner	Italy	AlbinoLeffe	Pro Sesto	Co-ownership
	Davide Marchini	Italy	Triestina	Cagliari	Co-ownership, undisclosed
	Packer	Brazil	Siena	Pescara	Loan
	Ilario Aloe	Italy	Internazionale	Ravenna	Co-ownership, undisclosed
	Andrea Soncin	Italy	Atalanta	Ascoli	Unknown
	Nicola Santoni	Italy	Brescia	Spezia	Unknown
	Denis Godeas	Italy	Chievo	Mantova	Unknown
	Gastone Bottini	Italy	Milan	Lecco	Unknown
	Davide Facchin	Italy	Milan	Olbia	Loan
	Massimo Zallocco	Italy	Lazio	Lecco	Unknown

^{1}Player officially joined his new club on 1 July 2007.

== See also ==
- List of Italian football transfers winter 2007–08

== Notes and references ==
General

- "Deposito Trasferimenti Calciatori – Stagione Sportiva 2007/2008". Lega Calcio. c. 2007. Archived from the original on 26 September 2007.

Specific
