= List of Italian football transfers winter 2007–08 =

This is a list of Italian football transfers for the January sale in 2007–08 season. Only moves from Serie A and Serie B are listed.

The winter transfer window was open for 4 weeks, starting on 3 January 2008. The window closed at midnight on 31 January. Players without a club may join one, either during or in between transfer windows.

For Alexandre Pato, although the deal was finalized between the two clubs in summer 2007, but FIFA would only permit international transfer for a player over 18 (with some exceptional clauses), and the deal would be registered in the windows after his 18th birthday, so Pato officially became a player of AC Milan on 4 January 2008.

== Winter transfer window ==
Date	Name	Nat	Moving from	Moving to	Fee
31 October 2007	Angelo Dorsa		Brescia	Lugano (Switzerland)	?
27 December 2007	Mattia Graffiedi		Triestina	Grosseto	Loan
29 December 2007	Mauro Minelli		Catania	Triestina	Loan
2 January 2008	Adriano	(Brazil)	Internazionale	São Paulo (Brazil)	Loan
3 January 2008	Christian Stuani		Danubio (Uruguay)	Reggina	Loan
4 January 2008	Marco Benvenuto		Triestina	South Tyrol	Undisclosed
4 January 2008	Lorenzo Rossetti		Triestina	Ravenna	Undisclosed
4 January 2008	Artur	(Brazil)	Cruzeiro (Brazil)	Siena	Free
4 January 2008	Richard Porta	(Uruguay)	River Plate (Uruguay)	Siena	€3.2M
4 January 2008	Alexandre Pato	(Brazil)	Internacional (Brazil)	Milan	€23.977M
4 January 2008	Riccardo Zampagna		Atalanta	Vicenza	€1.9M
4 January 2008	Davide Brivio		Atalanta	Vicenza	Co-ownership resolution, €750,000
4 January 2008	Simone Padoin		Vicenza	Atalanta	Co-ownership resolution, €1.55 million
4 January 2008	Tomáš Sivok		Udinese	(Czech Republic) Sparta Prague	Loan
4 January 2008	Sidny	(Brazil)	Salgueiro (Brazil)	Livorno	Undisclosed
5 January 2008	Luis Maria Alfageme		Brescia (at Pescara, t)	Sambenedettese	Loan
5 January 2008	Salvatore Foti		Sampdoria (& Udinese, c)	Messina	Loan
5 January 2008	Francesco Virdis		Sampdoria (at Ravenna, t)	Pescara	Loan
5 January 2008	Nicola Dal Bosco		Vicenza	Mezzocorona	Loan
7 January 2008	Natale Gonnella		Grosseto	Verona	Loan
7 January 2008	Sébastien Piocelle		Grosseto	Verona	Undisclosed
8 January 2008	Gabriele Piantoni		AlbinoLeffe (youth)	Prato	Loan
8 January 2008	Giulio Fogaroli		AlbinoLeffe	Prato	Loan
8 January 2008	Stefano Garzon		Chievo	Verona	Loan
9 January 2008	Jeda	(Brazil)	Rimini	Cagliari	Undisclosed
9 January 2008	Cristian Cesaretti		Empoli (at Sangiovannese, t)	Lucchese	Loan
9 January 2008	Sodinha	(Brazil)	Campo Grande (Brazil)	Udinese	Undisclosed
11 January 2008	Marco Storari		Milan (at Levante (Spain) , t)	Cagliari	Loan
11 January 2008	Divine Fonjock	(Cameroon)	Treviso	SPAL	Loan
2008-01-12	Gaetano Grieco	Italy	Napoli	Monza	Loan
2008-01-13	Paolo Foglio	Italy	Ascoli	AlbinoLeffe	Undisclosed
2008-01-14	Alessandro Bastrini	Italy	Sampdoria	Modena	Loan
2008-01-14	Fabio Gatti	Italy	Napoli	Modena	Free
2008-01-15	Nicki Bille Nielsen	Denmark	Reggina (on loan at Martina)	Lucchese	Loan
2008-01-15	Ivan Radovanović	Serbia	(Serbia) Partizan	Atalanta	Undisclosed
2008-01-16	Wilson	Brazil	(Brazil) Corinthians Paulista	Genoa	€1.1M
2008-01-17	Alessandro Di Maio	Italy	Genoa (on loan at Lugano)	Valenzana	Loan
2008-01-17	Rivaldo	Paraguay	Genoa (on loan at Lugano)	Potenza	Loan
2008-01-17	André Cuneaz	Italy	Cremonese	Pistoiese	Undisclosed (Co-ownership with Juventus)
2008-01-17	Massimo Zappino	Brazil	Frosinone (on loan at Chievo)	Pro Sesto	Loan
2008-01-17	Zlatko Dedič	Slovenia	Frosinone	Piacenza	Loan
2008-01-21	Roberto Colacone	Italy	Modena	AlbinoLeffe	Undisclosed
2008-01-21	Daniel Bombardieri	Italy	AlbinoLeffe	Pergocrema	Loan
2008-01-21	Andrea Offredi	Italy	AlbinoLeffe	Merate	Loan
2008-01-21	Luca Capecchi	Italy	Ravenna	Cagliari	Loan
2008-01-21	Vincenzo Marruocco	Italy	Cagliari	Ravenna	Loan
22 January 2008	Ricardo Matias Verón	Argentina	Siena	PAOK (Greece)	Loan
2008-01-22	Giovanni Taormina	Italy	Sampdoria	Sorrento	Loan
2008-01-22	Anthony Vanden Borre	Belgium	Fiorentina	Genoa	Co-ownership, €2.1M (Player exchange)
2008-01-22	Papa Waigo	Senegal	Genoa	Fiorentina	Co-ownership, €2.1M (Player exchange)
2008-01-23	Piá	Brazil	Napoli	Catania	Loan
2008-01-23	Ivano Trotta	Italy	Treviso	Ravenna	Loan
2008-01-23	Andrea Seculin	Italy	South Tyrol (youth)	Fiorentina (youth)	€0.3M
2008-01-24	Ricardo Faty	Senegal	Roma	(France) Nantes	Loan until June 2009
2008-01-24	Daniele Mannini	Italy	Brescia	Napoli	€7M
2008-01-25	Michele Paolucci	Italy	Udinese	Atalanta	Loan
2008-01-25	Ahmed Barusso	Ghana	Roma	(Turkey) Galatasaray	Loan
2008-01-25	Vítor Gomes	Portugal	(Portugal) Rio Ave	Cagliari	Loan
2008-01-25	Pablo Alvarez	Argentina	(Argentina) Estudiantes	Catania	Undisclosed
2008-01-25	Ezequiel Llama	Argentina	Catania	(Argentina) Newell's Old Boys	Loan
2008-01-28	Matías Silvestre	Argentina	(Argentina) Boca Juniors	Catania	Loan
2008-01-28	Samir Lacheheb	France	Ternana	Internazionale (youth)	Loan
29 January 2008	Luca Rigoni	Italy	Vicenza	Chievo	Co-ownership, €1M (€850,000 plus Marchesetti)
29 January 2008	Mattia Marchesetti	Italy	Chievo	Vicenza	Co-ownership resolution, €150,000
2008-01-29	Mohamed Sissoko	Mali	(England) Liverpool	Juventus	€13M + Bonus
2008-01-29	Andrea Cossu	Italy	Verona	Cagliari	Free
2008-01-29	Joe Bizera	Uruguay	Cagliari	(Israel) Maccabi Tel Aviv	Loan
2008-01-29	Luca Antonelli	Italy	Milan	Parma	Loan
2008-01-29	Antonino Bernardini	Italy	Atalanta	Vicenza	Undisclosed
2008-01-29	Riccardo Fissore	Italy	Vicenza	Atalanta	Loan
2008-01-29	Fabiano Santacroce	Italy	Brescia	Napoli	€5.5M
2008-01-29	Roberto De Zerbi	Italy	Napoli	Brescia	Loan
2008-01-29	Nicolás Navarro	Argentina	(Argentina) Argentinos Juniors	Napoli	€4.36M
2008-01-30	Omar Torri	Italy	AlbinoLeffe	Pavia	Loan
2008-01-30	Giampaolo Calzi	Italy	Ravenna	Perugia	Loan
2008-01-30	Artur	Brazil	Siena	Cesena	Loan
2008-01-30	Ousmane Dabo	France	(England) Manchester City	Lazio	€263K
30 January 2008	Federico Viviani	Italy	Lanciano	Pisa	Undisclosed
2008-01-30	Aimo Diana	Italy	Palermo	Torino	€1.2M
2008-01-30	Marco Pisano	Italy	Palermo	Torino	Loan
2008-01-31	Paolo Zanetti	Italy	Ascoli	Torino	Co-ownership resolution, Undisclosed
2008-01-31	Michele Pazienza	Italy	Fiorentina	Napoli	€4.25M
2008-01-31	Rubén Maldonado	Paraguay	Napoli	Chievo	Loan
2008-01-31	Vincenzo Chianese	Italy	Ravenna	Arezzo	Undisclosed
2008-01-31	Francesco Larosa	Italy	Ravenna	Martina	
2008-01-31	Matteo Centurioni	Italy	Ravenna	Novara	
2008-01-31	Patrick Kalambay	Italy	Milan	Ancona	Loan
2008-01-31	Ivan Piccoli	Italy	Cesena	Ancona	Loan
2008-01-31	Jonathan Biabiany	France	Internazionale	Modena	Loan
2008-01-31	Simone Fautario	Italy	Internazionale	Pistoiese	Loan
2008-01-31	Giacomo Bindi	Italy	Internazionale	Manfredonia	Loan
2008-01-31	Fabio Perissinotto	Italy	Internazionale	Pro Sesto	Loan
2008-01-31	Giorgio Schiavini	Italy	Internazionale	Pizzighettone	Loan
2008-01-31	Goran Slavkovski	Italy	Internazionale	(England) Sheffield United	Loan
2008-01-31	Jacopo Fortunato	Italy	Treviso	Internazionale	Co-ownership, Undisclosed
2008-01-31	Sebastian Carlsen	Sweden	(Sweden) Helsingborg	Internazionale	Loan, Youth
2008-01-31	Gennaro Troianiello	Italy	Frosinone	Ternana	Loan
2008-01-31	Andrea Giacomini	Italy	Roma	Ternana	Loan
2008-01-31	Alessandro Frara	Italy	Ternana	Rimini	Undisclosed
2008-01-31	Mattia Biso	Italy	Catania	Frosinone	Undisclosed
2008-01-31	Giorgio Di Vicino	Italy	Ternana	Spezia	Co-ownership, Undisclosed
2008-01-31	Samuele Buda	Italy	Cesena	Spezia	Co-ownership, Undisclosed
2008-01-31	Fabrizio Romondini	Italy	Venezia	Spezia	Loan
2008-01-31	Fabio Cusaro	Italy	Novara	Cesena	Co-ownership, Undisclosed
2008-01-31	Gianluca Berti	Italy	Cesena	Novara	Undisclosed
2008-01-31	Gennaro Esposito	Italy	Siena	Cesena	Undisclosed
2008-01-31	Andrea Paolucci	Italy	Fiorentina	Cesena	Loan
2008-01-31	Fabio Vignati	Italy	Cesena	Pro Sesto	Loan
2008-01-31	Dario Bova	Italy	Cesena	South Tyrol	Loan
2008-01-31	Stefano Fattori	Italy	Cesena	Martina	Loan
2008-01-31	Luís Gabriel Sacilotto	Brazil	Cesena	Perugia	Loan
2008-01-31	Luca Di Matteo	Italy	Pescara	Palermo	Co-ownership, €0.5M
2008-01-31	Edgar Çani	Albania	Pescara	Palermo	Co-ownership, €0.6M
2008-01-31	Andrea Caracciolo	Italy	Sampdoria (& Palermo)	Brescia	€7.05M
2008-01-31	Morris Donati	Italy	Brescia	Sampdoria	Co-ownership, €0.3M
2008-01-31	Mattia Mustacchio	Italy	Brescia	Sampdoria	Co-ownership, €0.7M
2008-01-31	Moussa Diarra	Côte d'Ivoire	Sampdoria	Siracusa	Loan
2008-01-31	Amadou Konte	Mali	Potenza	Spezia	Loan
2008-01-31	Marco Pecorari	Italy	Spezia	Ravenna	Loan
2008-01-31	Francesco Millesi	Italy	Catania	Spezia	Loan
2008-01-31	Francesco Zizzari	Italy	Lucchese	Spezia	Undisclosed
2008-01-31	Corrado Colombo	Italy	Spezia	Pisa	€0.2M (co-owned with Sampdoria)
2008-01-31	Cristian Fernández	Argentina	(Colombia) Deportivo Pereira	Spezia	Undisclosed
2008-01-31	Filippo Antonelli	Italy	Triestina	AlbinoLeffe	Loan
2008-01-31	Paolo Acerbis	Italy	AlbinoLeffe	Triestina	Undisclosed
2008-01-31	Riccardo Colombo	Italy	AlbinoLeffe	Udinese	Loan
2008-01-31	Alessandro Gherardi	Italy	(Switzerland) Bellinzona	AlbinoLeffe	Undisclosed
2008-01-31	Riccardo Nardini	Italy	Catania	Avellino	Undisclosed
2008-01-31	Generoso Rossi	Italy	Triestina	Catania	Loan
2008-01-31	Babú	Brazil	Catania	Triestina	Loan
2008-01-31	Marco De Angelis	Italy	Arezzo	Chievo	Free
2008-01-31	Marco De Angelis	Italy	Chievo	Foligno	Co-ownership, Undisclosed
2008-01-31	Giuseppe Greco	Italy	Genoa	Rimini	Loan
2008-01-31	Giuseppe Nuvoli	Italy	Chievo	Nuorese	Co-ownership, Undisclosed
2008-01-31	Marino Defendi	Italy	Atalanta	Chievo	Loan
2008-01-31	Matteo Melara	Italy	Torino	Livorno	Loan
2008-01-31	Tommaso Vailatti	Italy	Torino	Livorno	Loan
2008-01-31	Kwadwo Asamoah	Ghana	(Switzerland) Bellinzona	Torino	Loan
2008-01-31	Yusuf Baloğlu	Belgium	(Belgium) Standard Liège	Torino	Undisclosed
2008-01-31	Stefano Procida	Italy	Torino	Napoli	Co-ownership, €500
2008-01-31	Francesco Cardinali	Italy	Colleferro	Torino	Loan
2008-01-31	Sebastián Rosano	Uruguay	(Uruguay) Montevideo Wanderers	Cagliari	Loan
2008-01-31	Rodrigo De Lazzari	Brazil	Siena	Martina	Loan
2008-01-31	Vanderson Scardovelli	Brazill	Siena	Martina	Loan
2008-01-31	Giuseppe Caccavallo	Italy	Lecce	Martina	Loan
2008-01-31	David Rozehnal	Czech Republic	(England) Newcastle United	Lazio	Loan
2008-01-31	Matteo Bonatti	Italy	Massese	Lucchese	Undisclosed (co-owned with Empoli)
2008-01-31	Giacomo Zappacosta	Italy	Pescara	Fiorentina	Co-ownership, €0.275M
2008-01-31	Manuel Panini	Italy	Catania (on loan at Foggia)	Juve Stabia	Loan
2008-01-31	Michelangelo Minieri	Italy	Ascoli	Vicenza	Undisclosed
2008-01-31	Gianpietro Perrulli	Italy	Ascoli	Vicenza	Co-ownership, Undisclosed
2008-01-31	Evangelos Nastos	Greece	Vicenza	Ascoli	Undisclosed
2008-01-31	Vito Falconieri	Italy	Catania (on loan at Gela)	Catanzaro	Loan
2008-01-31	Rosario Bucolo	Italy	Catania (on loan at Gela)	Catanzaro	Loan
31 January 2008	Marco Andreolli	Italy	Roma	Vicenza	Loan
31 January 2008	Alessandro Sgrigna	Italy	Vicenza	Triestina	Co-ownership, €900,000
31 January 2008	Emiliano Testini	Italy	Triestina	Vicenza	Co-ownership, €900,000
31 January 2008	Emiliano Testini	Italy	Vicenza	Triestina	Loan
	Christian Tiboni	Italy	Udinese	Sassuolo	Loan
	Claudio Vargas	Paraguay	Udinese	(Paraguay) Luqueño	Loan
	Maxminio Montresor	Brazil	Treviso	Martina	
	Gianvito Plasmati	Italy	Catania	Taranto	Loan
	Daniele Greco	Italy	Lazio	Sassuolo	Loan
	Massimo Coda	Italy	Treviso	Crotone	Loan
	Federico Gerardi	Italy	Udinese	Sangiovannese	Loan
	Alberto Quadri	Italy	Lazio	Perugia	Loan
	Stefano Pietribiasi	Italy	Vicenza	Ivrea	Loan
	Alberto Galuppo	Italy	Parma	Carpenedolo	Loan
	Giovanni Fietta	Italy	Treviso	Cremonese	Co-ownership, Undisclosed
	Gianluca Falsini	Italy	Catania	Arezzo	Free
	Danilo D'Ambrosio	Italy	Fiorentina	Potenza	Co-ownership, €500
	Andrea Stucchi	Italy	Atalanta	Melfi	Co-ownership, Undisclosed
	Christian Conti	Italy	Bari	Perugia	Loan
	Matteo Lombardo	Italy	Internazionale	Caravaggese	Loan
	Fabio Ceccarelli	Italy	Treviso	Martina	Loan
	Matteo Merini	Italy	Lazio	(Poland) Kmita Zabierzów	Loan

== Temp ==
Date	Name	Nationality	Moving from	Moving to	Fee
2008-01-04	Domenico Rega	Italy	Grosseto	Paganese	
2008-01-05	Matías Masiero	Uruguay	(Uruguay) Central Español	Genoa	Undisclosed
2008-01-08	Bruno Cirillo	Italy	(Spain) Levante	Reggina	Loan
2008-01-09	Jadid	Morocco	Brescia	Bari	Loan
2008-01-09	Pablo da Luz Pereira	Brazil	Treviso	Parma	Undisclosed
2008-01-09	Pablo da Luz Pereira	Brazil	Parma	Rovigo	Loan
2008-01-09	Cristian Bucchi	Italy	Napoli	Bologna	Loan
2008-01-09	Tomas Danilevičius	Lithuania	Bologna	Grosseto	Loan
2008-01-09	Thomas Pichlmann	Austria	Austria Wien	Grosseto	Undisclosed
2008-01-10	Domenico Criscito	Italy	Juventus	Genoa	Loan
2008-01-10	Alessio Tombesi	Italy	Parma	Avellino	Loan
2008-01-10	Tommaso D'Attoma	Italy	Lumezzane	Brescia	Undisclosed
2008-01-10	Giuseppe Cardone	Italy	Parma	Cesena	Undisclosed
2008-01-11	Daniele Paponi	Italy	Parma	Cesena	Loan
2008-01-11	Gianpiero Romano	Italy	Sampdoria	Messina	Undisclosed
2008-01-11	Federico Rizzi	Italy	Mantova	Triestina	Loan
2008-01-11	Migjen Basha	Switzerland	Lucchese	Rimini	Co-ownership, Undisclosed
2008-01-14	Mark Iuliano	Italy	Unattached	Ravenna	Free
2008-01-15	Ibrahim Maaroufi	Morocco	Internazionale	(Netherlands) Twente	Loan
2008-01-15	Maniche	Portugal	(Spain) Atlético Madrid	Internazionale	Loan
2008-01-16	Vincenzo Sommese	Italy	Mantova	Ascoli	Undisclosed
2008-01-16	Franco Brienza	Italy	Palermo	Reggina	Loan
2008-01-16	Cristiano Lucarelli	Italy	(Ukraine) Shakhtar Donetsk	Parma	€5.7m
2008-01-17	Ferdinando Sforzini	Italy	Udinese	Ravenna	Loan
2008-01-17	Ettore Marchi	Italy	Triestina	Bellaria Igea Marina	Loan
2008-01-17	Luca Tedeschi	Italy	Treviso	Spezia	Loan
2008-01-17	Rubén Olivera	Uruguay	Juventus	(Uruguay) Peñarol	Loan
2008-01-17	Alessandro Budel	Italy	Cagliari	Empoli	Free
2008-01-18	Giacomo Cipriani	Italy	Bologna	Avellino	Loan
2008-01-18	Nicolás Amodio	Uruguay	Napoli	Mantova	Loan
2008-01-18	Christian Riganò	Italy	(Spain) Levante	Siena	Loan
2008-01-23	Antonino D'Agostino	Italy	Atalanta	Treviso	Loan
2008-01-23	Arturo Lupoli	Italy	Fiorentina	Treviso	Loan
2008-01-23	Daniele Corvia	Italy	Siena	Lecce	Loan
2008-01-23	Andrea Masiello	Italy	Genoa	Bari	Loan
2008-01-23	Rolando Bianchi	Italy	(England) Manchester City	Lazio	Loan
2008-01-23	Francesco Lodi	Italy	Frosinone	Empoli	Co-ownership resolution
2008-01-23	Francesco Lodi	Italy	Empoli	Frosinone	Loan
2008-01-23	Pedro Kamata	Angola	Legnano	Bari	Undisclosed
2008-01-24	Giorgio Lucenti	Italy	Mantova	Frosinone	Undisclosed
2008-01-24	Federico Giunti	Italy	Chievo	Treviso	Loan
2008-01-24	Sergio Almirón	Argentina	Juventus	(France) AS Monaco	Loan
2008-01-24	Adriano Mezavilla	Brazil	Cesena	Pisa	Loan
2008-01-24	Éder	Brazil	Empoli	Frosinone	Loan
2008-01-25	Marco Iovine	Italy	Verona	Genoa	Co-ownership resolution
2008-01-25	Marco Iovine	Italy	Genoa	Spezia	Co-ownership, Undisclosed
2008-01-25	Guilherme do Prado	Brazil	Fiorentina	Mantova	Loan
2008-01-26	Enrico Alfonso	Italy	Internazionale	Venezia	Loan
2008-01-26	Jean-Alain Boumsong	France	Juventus	(France) Lyon	€3m
2008-01-28	Guglielmo Stendardo	Italy	Lazio	Juventus	Loan
2008-01-28	Stefan Radu	Romania	(Romania) Dinamo București	Lazio	Loan
2008-01-28	Nikola Gulan	Serbia	(Serbia) Partizan	Sampdoria	Undisclosed
2008-01-28	Leandro Grimi	Argentina	Milan	(Portugal) Sporting	Loan
2008-01-28	Samuel Kuffour	Ghana	Roma	(Netherlands) Ajax	Free
2008-01-28	Nicola Ferrari	Italy	Sassuolo	Sampdoria	Loan
2008-01-28	Stefano Scappini	Italy	Ternana	Sampdoria	Loan
2008-01-29	Marco Fortin	Italy	Cagliari	Vicenza	Free
2008-01-29	Antonio Rizzo	Italy	Perugia	Reggina	Undisclosed
	Antonio Rizzo	Italy	Reggina	Perugia	Loan
2008-01-29	Lionel Scaloni	Argentina	Lazio	(Spain) Mallorca	Loan
2008-01-29	Antonio Zito	Italy	Taranto	Siena	Undisclosed
2008-01-29	Antonio Zito	Italy	Siena	Taranto	Loan
2008-01-30	Davide Saverino	Italy	Treviso	Ascoli	Undisclosed
2008-01-30	Raffaele Vallefuoco	Italy	Genoa	Frosinone	Undisclosed, Youth
2008-01-30	Devann Yao	United States	Livorno	Pisa	Undisclosed
2008-01-30	Lorenzo D'Anna	Italy	Piacenza	Treviso	Undisclosed
2008-01-30	Ivica Guberac	Slovenia	(Slovenia) Primorje	Cagliari	Undisclosed
2008-01-30	Federico Balzaretti	Italy	Fiorentina	Palermo	Loan
2008-01-30	Giovanni Passiglia	Italy	Pisa	Vicenza	Undisclosed
2008-01-30	Trevor Trevisan	Italy	Vicenza	Pisa	Co-ownership resolution, Undisclosed
2008-01-30	Francesco Bega	Italy	Genoa	Brescia	Undisclosed
2008-01-30	Danny Szetela	United States	(Spain) Racing Santander	Brescia	Loan
2008-01-30	Roland Varga	Hungary	(Hungary) MTK Hungária	Brescia	Undisclosed
2008-01-30	Daniele Fiorentino	Italy	Bari	Pro Patria	Loan
2008-01-31	Alessandro Tulli	Italy	Roma	Lecce	Co-ownership Resolution, €350K
2008-01-31	Alessandro Tulli	Italy	Lecce	Piacenza	Co-ownership, Undisclosed
2008-01-31	Matteo Lunati	Italy	Milan	San Marino	Loan
2008-01-31	Michael Cardin	Italy	Venezia	Vicenza	Undisclosed
2008-01-31	Davide Matteini	Italy	Parma	Vicenza	Loan
2008-01-31	Manuel da Costa	Portugal	(Netherlands) PSV	Fiorentina	€4.5m
2008-01-31	Andrea Costa	Italy	Bologna	Reggina	Loan
2008-01-31	David Giubilato	Italy	Vicenza	Bologna	Loan
2008-01-31	Attila Filkor	Hungary	Internazionale	Grosseto	Loan
2008-01-31	Carlo Luisi	Italy	Modena	Pisa	Undisclosed
2008-01-31	Luca Tabbiani	Italy	Bari	Triestina	Co-ownership, Undisclosed
2008-01-31	Andrea Mariani	Italy	Roma	Lazio	Undisclosed, Youth
2008-01-31	Stephen Makinwa	Nigeria	Lazio	Reggina	Loan
2008-01-31	Malik Hioune	Algeria	(France) Lens	Reggina	Undisclosed
2008-01-31	Leonardo Martín Migliónico	Uruguay	Piacenza	Sampdoria	Co-ownership, Undisclosed
2008-01-31	Houssine Kharja	Morocco	Piacenza	Siena	Loan
2008-01-31	Manuel Coppola	Italy	Genoa	Siena	Loan
2008-01-31	Giovanni Formiconi	Italy	Cisco Roma	Udinese	Loan
2008-01-31	Nicolò Cherubin	Italy	Reggina	Avellino	Loan
2008-01-31	Francesco Della Rocca	Italy	Bologna	Avellino	Loan
2008-01-31	Giovanni Marchese	Italy	Chievo	Bari	Loan
2008-01-31	Vujadin Savić	Serbia	(Serbia) Red Star Belgrade	Brescia	Undisclosed
2008-01-31	Viktor Budyanskiy	Russia	Udinese	Lecce	Loan
2008-01-31	Gennaro Marigliano	Italy	Brescia	Mantova	Undisclosed, Youth
2008-01-31	Matteo Serafini	Italy	Vicenza	Piacenza	Loan
2008-01-31	Giuseppe Ingrosso	Italy	Bari	Ravenna	Loan
2008-01-31	Gionata Mingozzi	Italy	Sampdoria	Treviso	Co-ownership, Undisclosed
2008-01-31	Ondřej Herzán	Czech Republic	Verona	Spezia	Co-ownership, Undisclosed
2008-01-31	Moreno	Brazil	(Brazil) Botafogo	Udinese	Free
2008-02-09	Sandro Bloudek	Slovenia	A.C. Milan	(Switzerland) Chiasso	Loan
2008-02-13	Bruno Mota	Switzerland	Sampdoria	(Switzerland) Chiasso	Loan

== See also ==
- List of Italian football transfers Summer 2007
