= Davide Morello =

Italian footballer (born 1978)

Personal information
- Date of birth: 22 June 1978 (age 48)
- Place of birth: Palermo, Italy
- Height: 1.78 m (5 ft 10 in)
- Position: Goalkeeper

Senior career*
Years	Team	Apps	(Gls)
1999–2000	Ruggiero di Lauria	19	(0)
2000–2001	Cephaledium	30	(0)
2001–2002	Cavese	25	(0)
2002–2004	Isernia	40	(0)
2004–2005	Gela	32	(0)
2005–2007	Ancona	25	(0)
2007–2010	Pisa	63	(0)
2010–2012	Torino	11	(0)
2012–2013	Trapani	0	(0)
- * Club domestic league appearances and goals

Davide Morello (born 22 June 1978) is an Italian former professional footballer who played as a goalkeeper.

Morello played his entire career in Italy, across the divisions. He played for Ruggiero di Lauria, Cephaledium, Cavese, Isernia, Gela, Ancona, Pisa, Torino and Trapani. He won five promotions throughout his career, he was relegated once with Pisa in 2008–09.

== Playing career ==
Morello kicked off his career in Serie D with Ruggiero di Lauria, he made nineteen appearances before moving onto fellow Serie D club Cephaledium where he played in thirty matches. Morello then moved up to Serie C2 in 2001 to join Cavese where he stayed for one season, making twenty-five appearances, before again moving clubs and dropping back to Serie D to go to Isernia in 2002. He made twelve appearances in his debut season for the Molise club in which the club won promotion to Serie C2, meaning Morello returned to Italy's fourth tier after one year out of it. He stayed with Isernia until 2004 and made a total of forty appearances.

His next stop was to Sicily to sign for Gela, after making thirty-two appearances in Gela he was again on the move as he joined Ancona in 2005. Morello stayed with Ancona for two seasons, he made twenty-five appearances in total and was part of the Ancona team that won promotion to Serie C1 from Serie C2 in 2005–06. He left at the end of Ancona's promotion season after making just seven appearances, as opposed to eighteen in his first season with the club. Next came a transfer to Pisa, who he stayed with longer than any other club in his career.

He spent four campaigns at Pisa, where things started slow for Morello as he made only four appearances in 2006–07 before becoming the club's number one for 2007–08 and 2008–09 when he made thirty-six and twenty-three appearances respectively. He again tasted promotion in 2006–07 when Pisa were promoted to Serie B but also suffered his first relegation in his career when Pisa finished 20th in Serie B in 2008–09. Pisa were relegated to Serie D rather than Serie C1 due to financial issues. Torino became Morello's eighth club when they signed him in January 2010, he stayed in Turin for two and a half seasons as he participated in only eleven matches.

There was some joy for Morello though as in his final season, 2011–12, he once again won promotion as Torino finished second on goal difference in Serie B to gain a place in Italy's top-flight Serie A. He left at the end of that season in 2012 to join his final club, Trapani. In what was his final season as a player he failed to make a Serie B appearance for Trapani but did take part in his fifth career promotion as Trapani won the 2012–13 Serie C1. Although Morello didn't make a league appearance for Trapani, he did make one last career appearance when he played the full ninety minutes in the first leg of the Supercoppa di Lega Pro final against Avellino. He didn't make the squad for the second leg and left the club at the end of the season and subsequently retired.

== After football ==
In June 2019, Morello became the sporting director of refounded Serie D side Messina. He left the role in May 2020.

== Career statistics ==
As of match played 19 May 2013.

Appearances and goals by club, season and competition
Club	Season	League			National Cup		Other		Total	
Club	Season	Division	Apps	Goals	Apps	Goals	Apps	Goals	Apps	Goals
Ruggiero di Lauria	1999–00	Serie D	19	0	0	0	0	0	19	0
Cephaledium	2000–01	Serie D	30	0	0	0	0	0	30	0
Cavese	2001–02	Serie C2	25	0	0	0	0	0	25	0
Isernia	2002–03	Serie D	12	0	0	0	0	0	12	0
Isernia	2003–04	Serie C2	28	0	0	0	0	0	28	0
Isernia	Total		40	0	0	0	0	0	40	0
Gela	2004–05	Serie C2	32	0	0	0	0	0	32	0
Ancona	2005–06	Serie C2	18	0	0	0	0	0	18	0
Ancona	2006–07	Serie C1	7	0	0	0	0	0	7	0
Ancona	Total		25	0	0	0	0	0	25	0
Pisa	2006–07	Serie C1	4	0	0	0	0	0	4	0
Pisa	2007–08	Serie B	36	0	1	0	0	0	37	0
Pisa	2008–09	Serie B	23	0	1	0	0	0	24	0
Pisa	2009–10	Serie D	0	0	0	0	0	0	0	0
Pisa	Total		63	0	2	0	0	0	65	0
Torino	2009–10	Serie B	6	0	0	0	0	0	6	0
Torino	2010–11	Serie B	2	0	1	0	0	0	3	0
Torino	2011–12	Serie B	3	0	0	0	0	0	3	0
Torino	Total		11	0	1	0	0	0	12	0
Trapani	2012–13	Serie C1	0	0	0	0	1	0	1	0
Career total			245	0	3	0	1	0	249	0

== Honours ==
Trapani

- Serie C1: 2012–13
