= Ivan Artipoli =

Italian footballer (born 1986)

Personal information
- Date of birth: 24 March 1986 (age 40)
- Place of birth: Pescara, Italy
- Height: 1.84 m (6 ft 0 in)
- Position: Centre back

Youth career
- Pescara
- 2004–2006: Sampdoria
- 2005–2006: → Prato (loan)

Senior career*
Years	Team	Apps	(Gls)
2004	Pescara	1	(0)
2004–2006	Sampdoria	0	(0)
2005–2006	→ Prato (loan)	0	(0)
2006	→ Chiasso (loan)	0	(0)
2006–2007	Prato	21	(0)
2007–2012	Lazio	1	(0)
2008–2009	→ Modena (loan)	10	(0)
2010	→ Foggia (loan)	8	(0)
Total		41	(0)

International career
2004	Italy U18	2	(0)
2005	Italy U19	1	(0)
- * Club domestic league appearances and goals

Ivan Artipoli (born 24 March 1986) is an Italian former professional footballer who plays as a centre back.

== Biography ==
Born in Pescara, Abruzzo, Artipoli started his career at Pescara Calcio. Artipoli was the member of the reserve since 2001–02 season. He made his Serie B debut on 12 June 2004, the last round, a 2–2 draw with Ternana. Before the match Pescara needed 3 points in order to avoid direct relegation. Artipoli was the starting centre-back of the match, eventually Venezia won the match and Pescara relegated directly. Pescara later re-admitted along with relegation "play-out" losing side Bari in order to replace bankrupted Ancona and Napoli.

=== Sampdoria ===
In June 2004 Artipoli was signed by UC Sampdoria outright for undisclosed fee. Artipoli spent a season with Samp's reserve before moved to AC Prato in summer 2005. In January 2006 Artipoli left for Chiasso (swapped with Bruno da Mota) but did not play any game in 2005–06 Swiss Challenge League.

Artipoli was loaned to Parto again in 2006–07 Serie C1. The club also had the first option to sign him in co-ownership deal for a peppercorn fee of €500. In June 2007 Prato excised the rights. Artipoli played the first round of 2007–08 Serie C2 before signed by S.S. Lazio on 31 August 2007. Sampdoria retained the stake on Artipoli's contract.

=== Lazio ===
Artipoli was signed by Lazio on 31 August 2007 for €200,000 in 5-year contract. Artipoli made his senior debut in an Italian Cup quarter final against Fiorentina, which his team won 2–1. He made his Serie A debut in the penultimate round of the season, away to Genoa.

Lazio sent him on loan for the 2008–09 season to second division club Modena to gain experience. In the Emilia–Romagna team, Artipoli played just 10 games before returning to Lazio at the end of the season.

In January 2010, he was loaned to Foggia for the remainder of 2009–10 Lega Pro Prima Divisione. In June 2010 Sampdoria gave up its retained 50% registration rights of Artipoli. He failed to play any game in 2010–11 Serie A and 2011–12 Serie A.
