= Dario Biasi =

Italian football defender (born 1979)

Personal information
- Date of birth: 24 August 1979 (age 47)
- Place of birth: Isola della Scala, Italy
- Height: 1.83 m (6 ft 0 in)
- Position: Defender

Youth career
- Verona

Senior career*
Years	Team	Apps	(Gls)
1997–2006	Verona	101	(3)
1998–1999	→ Carpi (loan)	14	(0)
1999–2000	→ Siena (loan)	2	(0)
2001–2002	→ Pavia (loan)	29	(0)
2006–2007	Genoa	12	(0)
2007	→ Verona (loan)	9	(1)
2007–2010	Cesena	80	(1)
2010–2011	Cagliari	0	(0)
2011–2014	Frosinone	56	(2)
2014–2016	Pavia	38	(0)
2016–2017	Arzignano	19	(0)
2017–2018	Valgatara		
2018–2021	Ambrosiana	81	(13)
2021–2022	Vigasio		
- * Club domestic league appearances and goals

Dario Biasi (born 24 August 1979) is an Italian former football defender.

== Biography ==
On 18 January 2007 he was re-signed by Verona.

On 14 July 2010 Biasi was signed by Cagliari in a 2-year contract.

In December 2010 he was signed by Frosinone.
