= Alessandro Vinci =

Italian footballer (born 1987)

Personal information
- Date of birth: 8 August 1987 (age 39)
- Place of birth: Florence, Italy
- Height: 1.83 m (6 ft 0 in)
- Position: Defender

Team information
- Current team: Paganese

Youth career
- Empoli

Senior career*
Years	Team	Apps	(Gls)
2006–2012	Empoli	91	(0)
2006–2007	→ Cuoiopelli Cappiano (loan)	10	(0)
2007–2008	→ Melfi (loan)	30	(0)
2012–2013	Juve Stabia	2	(0)
2013	→ Pro Vercelli (loan)	6	(0)
2013–2014	Vicenza	5	(0)
2014–	Paganese	30	(3)
- * Club domestic league appearances and goals

Alessandro Vinci (born 8 August 1987) is an Italian professional footballer who plays for Paganese, as a defender.

== Career ==
=== Empoli ===
Born in Florence, Tuscany, Vinci started his career at Tuscan club Empoli. Vinci was the member of under-17 team in 2003–04 season, under-18 team in 2004–05 season and lastly for the reserve in 2005–06 season. He was loaned to Cuoio Pelli – Cappiano Romaiano in 2006–07 Serie C2, as well as farmed to Melfi in co-ownership deal for 2007–08 Serie C2 in July 2007. In June 2008 Empoli bought back Vinci from Melfi, after 30 out of possible 34 appearances for the fourth division club. Vinci was suspended twice, one in the league, one in Coppa Italia Serie C. (but to be excised after 2007–08 season, the next match Vinci originally eligible for.)

=== Juve Stabia ===
In July 2012 Vinci was signed by fellow second division club S.S. Juve Stabia. However, after only 2 appearances in 2012–13 Serie B, he was loaned to Pro Vercelli, also in Serie B. Vinci did not have any number for the first team at the start of 2013–14 Serie B. He was sold on the last day of transfer window.

=== Vicenza ===
On 2 September 2013 Vinci was signed by the third division club Vicenza. He became one of the starting defender since round 3 (15 September), after one games as unused bench; He missed a week due to injury (round 5 of the league) as well as suspension (cup) in early October but injured again in early November.

=== Paganese ===
On 2 August 2014 he was signed by Paganese.

=== Representative teams ===
Vinci capped twice for Italy Serie C under-21 representative team in 2007–09 International Challenge Trophy in 2007–08 season. He also capped for under-20 Serie C (de facto the same team with U21 "C": age limit of born 1987 or after) which 2–2 draw with under-21 Serie B.
