= Alessandro Bettega =

Italian footballer (born 1987)

Personal information
- Date of birth: 5 May 1987 (age 39)
- Place of birth: Turin, Italy
- Height: 1.82 m (6 ft 0 in)
- Position: Midfielder

Youth career
- Juventus

Senior career*
Years	Team	Apps	(Gls)
2006–2007	Juventus	1	(0)
2007–2009	Siena	0	(0)
2007–2008	→ Monza (loan)	15	(3)
2008	→ Ravenna (loan)	11	(0)
2009	Pizzighettone	12	(1)
2009–2010	Valle del Giovenco	19	(0)
Total		58	(4)
- * Club domestic league appearances and goals

Alessandro Bettega (born 5 May 1987) is an Italian former professional footballer who played as a midfielder. He is the son of former Juventus and Italian international footballer Roberto Bettega, who also served as Juventus's vice-president.

== Career ==
Bettega began his career is a product of the Juventus youth system and played for the youth teams alongside Claudio Marchisio, Paolo De Ceglie, Domenico Criscito and Sebastian Giovinco. He was part of their title-winning Primavera team during the 2005–06 season, and they were all promoted to the Juventus first team during the 2006–07 season, following the club's relegation to Serie B due to their involvement in the 2006 Calciopoli scandal.

With Juventus back in the Serie A the following season, he left the club after failing to establish himself in the first team. He is currently playing for Valle del Giovenco in the Lega Pro Prima Divisione.
