= Enrique David Mateo =

Brazilian footballer (born 1987)

Personal information
- Full name: Enrique David Mateo
- Date of birth: 21 February 1987 (age 39)
- Place of birth: São Bernardo do Campo, Brazil
- Height: 1.88 m (6 ft 2 in)
- Position: Defender

Youth career
- São Caetano
- 2005–2007: Fiorentina

Senior career*
Years	Team	Apps	(Gls)
2007–2012	Fiorentina	0	(0)
2007–2008	→ Arezzo (loan)	0	(0)
2008–2010	→ Lecco (loan)	37	(2)
2011–2012	→ Campobasso (loan)	18	(1)
- * Club domestic league appearances and goals

Enrique David Mateo (born 21 February 1987) is a Brazilian footballer.

== Biography ==
Born in São Bernardo do Campo, Greater São Paulo, Mateo started his career at São Caetano of São Paulo metropolitan area. In September 2005 he was signed by Fiorentina, and played at Primavera team.

He graduated from U-20 youth team in summer 2007, signing a new 5-year contract. He joined Arezzo but did not play.

He was loaned to Lecco for 2 seasons. Lecco received performance bonus of €18,000 from Fiorentina for the free loan.

On the last day of 2011 summer transfer he was loaned to Campobasso.
