= Fabio Ceccarelli =

Italian footballer

Personal information
- Date of birth: 20 April 1983 (age 43)
- Place of birth: Frascati, Italy
- Height: 1.88 m (6 ft 2 in)
- Position: Forward

Team information
- Current team: Romana FC

Senior career*
Years	Team	Apps	(Gls)
2003–2004	Monterotondo	34	(6)
2004–2005	ASD Sampolese		
2005–2006	ASD Vivi Calcio Spes Mentana	14	(5)
2006–2007	Gela	23	(6)
2007	Rovigo	16	(5)
2008	Martina	8	(3)
2008–2009	Monopoli	26	(16)
2009–2010	Cosenza	9	(1)
2010	→ Foggia (loan)	12	(2)
2010–2011	Brindisi	14	(5)
2011–2012	Aprilia	26	(14)
2012–2013	Matera	20	(10)
2013	Sulmona	15	(9)
2013–2014	AS Bisceglie 1913	13	(2)
2014	San Cesareo	9	(3)
2014–2015	Palestrina	20	(18)
2015	Argentina Arma	15	(5)
2015–2016	Castello Calcio San Secondo	8	(2)
2016	Fiorenzuola	1	(0)
2016–2017	Pomezia		
2017–2018	Monti Cimini		
2018–2019	Unipomezia Virtus		
2019	Palestrina		
2019–2020	Cynthia		
2020–2021	ASD Atletico Torrenova 1986		
2021–2022	Rocca Priora Calcio		
2022–2023	SSD Colonna		
2023–2024	ASD Valle Martella Calcio		
2024–	Romana FC		
- * Club domestic league appearances and goals as of 16 October 2026

Fabio Ceccarelli (born 7 February 1983) is an Italian footballer who plays as a forward for Romana FC.

== Biography ==
Born in Rome, Lazio, Ceccarelli started his senior career at Serie D teams before signing with Serie C2 club Gela Calcio. In June 2007 he was signed by Serie B team Treviso on free transfer. However, he was loaned to Lega Pro teams Rovigo, Martina and Monopoli before Treviso bankrupted in 2009. He was signed by Serie A club Chievo on a free transfer but immediately farmed to Cosenza in co-ownership deal on 6 July, for a peppercorn fee of €1,000. "Team-mate" Daniele Piro also joined the same club in the same window. On 1 February 2010 he left for Foggia, and Piro also left the club.

On 25 June 2010 Cosenza acquired him outright for free. On 25 August 2010 he was loaned to Seconda Divisione club Brindisi.

In summer 2011, he was signed by Aprilia on a free transfer.
