= Emiliano Testini =

Italian footballer (born 1977)

Personal information
- Date of birth: 9 January 1977 (age 49)
- Place of birth: Perugia, Italy
- Height: 1.72 m (5 ft 7 1/2 in)
- Position: Winger

Team information
- Current team: Lucchese (assistant coach)

Youth career
- –1996: Perugia

Senior career*
Years	Team	Apps	(Gls)
1996–1998	Perugia	2	(0)
1998	→ Fano (loan)	15	(0)
1998	Foggia	3	(0)
1998–2000	Viterbese	53	(9)
2000–2001	Perugia	0	(0)
2000–2001	→ Catania (loan)	10	(0)
2001–2003	Arezzo	62	(18)
2004–2006	AlbinoLeffe	98	(13)
2006–2011	Triestina	174	(21)
2011–2012	Spezia	19	(1)

Managerial career
- 2014: Bastia (assistant)
- 2014–2015: Deruta
- 2018–2020: Arezzo (sporting director)
- 2023–: Lucchese (assistant)
- * Club domestic league appearances and goals

Emiliano Testini (born 9 January 1977) is an Italian football coach and a former player. He is an assistant coach with Lucchese.

== Career ==
Testini made his debut in Serie A on 22 December 1996 with the shirt of Perugia in the 0–0 draw against Bologna, that was his only match in the Italian top flight. Perugia also competed in the European 2000 Intertoto Cup.
