= Rosario Bucolo =

Italian footballer

Personal information
- Full name: Rosario Alessandro Bucolo
- Date of birth: 7 October 1988 (age 38)
- Place of birth: Catania, Italy
- Height: 1.70 m (5 ft 7 in)
- Position: Midfielder

Team information
- Current team: Sancataldese Calcio
- Number: 25

Youth career
- –2007: Catania

Senior career*
Years	Team	Apps	(Gls)
2007–2010	Catania	0	(0)
2007	→ Gela (loan)	13	(1)
2008	→ Catanzaro (loan)	8	(0)
2008–2009	→ Reggiana (loan)	4	(0)
2009–2010	→ Celano (loan)	20	(1)
2010–2012	Milazzo	62	(2)
2013–2015	Messina	83	(1)
2015	Martina Franca	15	(0)
2015–2016	Padova	24	(0)
2016–2020	Catania	78	(4)
2020	Sicula Leonzio	11	(0)
2020–2021	Acireale	6	(0)
2021	Potenza	17	(0)
2021–2022	Mantova	8	(0)
2022	Potenza	13	(0)
2022	Acireale	13	(0)
2022–2023	FC Francavilla	20	(0)
2023–2024	Real Casalnuovo	21	(0)
2024–2025	Paganese	32	(1)
2025–2026	Vibonese	19	(0)
2026–	Sancataldese Calcio	0	(0)
- * Club domestic league appearances and goals as of 15 February 2026

Rosario Alessandro Bucolo (born 7 October 1988) is an Italian footballer who plays as a midfielder for Serie D club Sancataldese Calcio.

== Club career ==
On 3 January 2020, he signed a 1.5-year contract with Sicula Leonzio.

On 31 July 2021, he joined to Mantova. On 14 January 2022, his contract with Mantova was terminated by mutual consent. On the next day, he returned to Potenza.
