= Carlo Coppari =

Italian footballer (born 1989)

Personal information
- Date of birth: 26 May 1989 (age 35)
- Place of birth: Osimo, Italy
- Height: 1.78 m (5 ft 10 in)
- Position(s): Midfielder

Senior career*
Years	Team	Apps	(Gls)
- Fano
	Mantova	1	(0)
2009-2010	Poggibonsi	20	(0)
	Mezzocorona	20	(1)
2012	Krabi		
- Fano
- Chiesanuova
- Filottranese
- *Club domestic league appearances and goals

Carlo Coppari (born 26 May 1989) is an Italian footballer who plays as a midfielder for Filottranese.

== Career ==
In 2009, Coppari signed for Italian third division side Poggibonsi from Mantova in the Italian second division.

Before the 2012 season, he signed for Thai second division club Krabi, before joining Fano in the Italian fourth division.
