= Alessio Tombesi =

Italian footballer (born 1982)

Personal information
- Date of birth: 25 April 1982 (age 44)
- Place of birth: Rome, Italy
- Height: 1.76 m (5 ft 9 in)
- Positions: Defender; midfielder

Youth career
- 1999–2000: Viterbese

Senior career*
Years	Team	Apps	(Gls)
2000–2001	Frosinone	12	(0)
2001–2004	Perugia	0	(0)
2002–2003	→ Sambenedettese (loan)	0	(0)
2003–2004	→ Paternò (loan)	24	(2)
2004	Chievo	0	(0)
2004–2005	Vittoria	27	(2)
2005–2007	Carpenedolo	57	(0)
2007–2008	Parma	2	(0)
2008	→ Avellino (loan)	10	(0)
2008–2010	Novara	48	(0)
2010–2011	Atletico Roma	13	(0)
2011–2012	Triestina	22	(0)
- * Club domestic league appearances and goals

Alessio Tombesi (born 25 April 1982) is an Italian former footballer who played as a defender or midfielder.

== Career ==
Tombesi started his career at Viterbese of Serie B. He then played for Frosinone of Serie D and won promotion in summer 2001.

He was signed by A.C. Perugia, at that time in Serie A. After a season in their youth team, he was loaned to Sambenedettese of Serie C1. In summer 2003, Tombesi transferred to Paternò of Serie C1 as the club bought half of the player contractual rights.

In summer 2004, Chievo signed Tombesi, but again, he was farmed to Vittoria (Serie C1) in co-ownership deal, then Carpenedolo (Serie C2) in co-ownership deal until released in summer 2007.

But on 2 July 2007, he was offered a contract from Parma F.C. of Serie A, where he made his Serie A debut on 26 August 2007 against Catania. But he just played once more before left on loan to Serie B club Avellino.

At the end of season, he joined Novara in co-ownership deal.

In summer 2010 he joined Atletico Roma in co-ownership deal from Parma, along with Gianluca Lapadula (loan), Abel Gigli (co-ownership) and Abdou Doumbia (loan) for undisclosed fee, as part of the deal that Lega Pro Seconda Divisione top-scorer Daniel Ciofani moved to opposite direction in another co-ownership deal for undisclosed fee.

After the bankrupt of Atletico Roma, he joined Triestina on free transfer.
