= André Cuneaz =

Italian footballer (born 1987)

Personal information
- Date of birth: 1 June 1987 (age 39)
- Place of birth: Turin, Italy
- Height: 1.73 m (5 ft 8 in)
- Position: Midfielder

Team information
- Current team: VdA Saint-Christophe

Youth career
- 2000–2007: Juventus

Senior career*
Years	Team	Apps	(Gls)
2007–2008	Cremonese	1	(0)
2008	Pistoiese	5	(0)
2008–2010	Mantova	16	(0)
2010	→ Taranto (loan)	12	(0)
2010–2012	Alessandria	31	(1)
2012–	VdA Saint-Christophe		
- * Club domestic league appearances and goals as of 24 September 2012 ‡ National team caps and goals as of 24 September 2012

André Cuneaz (born 1 June 1987) is an Italian footballer, who plays for VdA Saint-Christophe, in the Italian Lega Pro Seconda Divisione BC07.

== Club career ==
=== Juventus ===
Cuneaz began his career with his hometown club Juventus FC in 2000. After working his way through the club's youth system, he joined the Primavera youth squad in 2006. Cuneaz was often called up to the first team during the 2006–07 season, but never made his league debut.

=== Cremonese & Pistoiese ===
In July 2007, Cuneaz was sold in a joint ownership agreement to U.S. Cremonese of Serie C1. Following his transfer, the young midfielder soon made his professional debut. However, after that match he failed to play and left for Pistoiese. In June 2008, Juventus bought him back for a nominal fee of €500 and soon re-sold in another co-ownership agreement on 3 July 2008.

=== A.C. Mantova ===
Cuneaz was signed by A.C. Mantova on 3 July 2008, and in his first season with the Serie B outfit, he made 12 league appearances, and also made two Coppa Italia appearances. Despite a quiet first season at the club, the team directors opted to prolong the player's stay at the club for another season, after reaching an agreement with Juventus. In January 2010, Mantova and Juventus agreed on a loan deal for the young playmaker, after he made just four league appearances in the first portion of the 2009-10 Serie B season. During his six-month loan agreement with Taranto Sport, of the Italian Lega Pro Prima Divisione, Cuneaz made 12 league appearances. In June 2010, the co-ownership was resolved in favor of Juventus, and hence the player is owned outright by Juventus.

=== U.S. Alessandria ===
On 25 June 2010, Juventus resolved the co-ownership deal with A.C. Mantova in Juventus' favor. In July 2010, he was sold to U.S. Alessandria Calcio 1912 in a new co-ownership deal, in the Italian Lega Pro Prima Divisione. The following season, the transfer was made permanent. He has since made 31 league appearances for the club scoring 1 goal.
