= Andrea Giacomini =

Italian footballer (born 1987)

Personal information
- Full name: Andrea Giacomini
- Date of birth: 4 April 1987 (age 39)
- Place of birth: Ciampino, Italy
- Height: 1.87 m (6 ft 1 1/2 in)
- Position: Midfielder

Youth career
- Roma

Senior career*
Years	Team	Apps	(Gls)
2007–2009	Roma	0	(0)
2007–2008	→ Vicenza (loan)	8	(0)
2008	→ Ternana (loan)	2	(0)
2008–2009	→ Gallipoli (loan)	9	(0)
2009–2010	Rimini	19	(2)
2010–2011	Cosenza	24	(1)
2012–2013	Latina	23	(3)
2013–2014	Ascoli	26	(0)
2014	Salernitana	1	(0)
2014–2015	Matera	5	(0)

International career
2004	Italy U17	4	(0)
2006	Italy U20	1	(0)
- * Club domestic league appearances and goals

Andrea Giacomini (born 4 April 1987) is an Italian footballer who plays as a midfielder.

== Biography ==
Born in Ciampino, the Province of Rome, Giacomini started his career at A.S. Roma and signed a contract until 30 June 2010. After graduating from Primavera Team, he was loaned to Serie B side Vicenza and Serie C1 side Ternana. In 2008–09 season, he left for Gallipoli where he won the Lega Pro Prima Divisione champion.

In July 2009, he joined Rimini in a co-ownership deal.

On 9 June 2014, he was signed by Salernitana . However, on 1 September, he was released. On 7 September he was about to sign for L'Aquila. However, he joined Matera on 14 October instead.

He capped for Italy at the 2004 UEFA European Under-17 Football Championship qualification.

== Honours ==
Gallipoli

- Lega Pro Prima Divisione: 2009
