= Giorgio Lucenti =

Italian footballer

Personal information
- Date of birth: 19 September 1975 (age 51)
- Place of birth: Ragusa, Italy
- Height: 1.79 m (5 ft 10 in)
- Position: Midfielder

Team information
- Current team: Juve Stabia (technical collaborator)

Youth career
- Ragusa

Senior career*
Years	Team	Apps	(Gls)
1994–1997	Palermo	31	(0)
1997–1999	Roma	0	(0)
1998–1999	→ Empoli (loan)	42	(2)
1999–2000	Napoli	36	(5)
2000–2003	Cagliari	86	(10)
2003–2005	Piacenza	74	(8)
2005–2007	Catania	54	(1)
2007–2008	Mantova	15	(0)
2008–2009	Frosinone	36	(2)
2009–2010	Potenza	16	(3)
2010–2012	U.S. Siracusa	37	(1)

Managerial career
- 2023: Juve Stabia (caretaker)
- * Club domestic league appearances and goals

Giorgio Lucenti (born 19 September 1975) is a retired Italian football player, and current coach. He is currently contracted with Juve Stabia as a technical collaborator.

== Playing career ==
Born in Ragusa, Sicily, Giorgio and his brother Gaetano started his career at Ragusa. He then signed with Palermo. In summer 1997, he was transferred to A.S. Roma, but in January 1998 left for Serie A side Empoli. In July 1999, he joined Napoli in co-ownership deal, for 1.2 billion Italian lire, but bought back for 0.99 billion lire in June 2000. In summer 2000, he was sold to Cagliari in co-ownership deal for a nominal amount of 1 million lire. He played 31 league matches in the first season. In June 2001, Cagliari bought the remaining registration rights for 8 billion lire (about €4million, and as part of Jonathan Zebina's debt). He was the regular for Cagliari in the Serie B campaign, but in 2003 sold to league rival Piacenza.

In 2005, he returned to Sicily, but for Catania. He won promotion to Serie A in 2006 with the team. In the 2006–07 season, he played 16 starts in 24 league appearances.

In July 2007, he joined Mantova in a 2-year deal. But in January 2008, he left for Frosinone. In July 2009, he signed a 2-year contract with Lega Pro Prima Divisione side Potenza.

== Coaching career ==
In 2019, Lucenti joined Juve Stabia as a youth coach, being successively promoted as a coaching staff member and technical collaborator under Walter Novellino and Leonardo Colucci. Following the resignation of Colucci, Lucenti was temporarily appointed as interim head coach, overseeing a 1–0 away win against Viterbese.
