= Alberto Quadri =

Italian footballer (born 1983)

Personal information
- Date of birth: January 9, 1983 (age 43)
- Place of birth: Brescia, Italy
- Height: 1.80 m (5 ft 11 in)
- Position: Midfielder

Youth career
- 2001–2002: Internazionale Milano

Senior career*
Years	Team	Apps	(Gls)
2002–2006	Internazionale	0	(0)
2002	→ Spezia (loan)	2	(0)
2003	→ Mantova (loan)	9	(0)
2003–2004	→ Padova (loan)	0	(0)
2004–2005	→ Montichiari (loan)	30	(2)
2005–2006	→ Pizzighettone (loan)	31	(5)
2006–2011	Lazio	1	(0)
2007	→ Spezia (loan)	8	(0)
2007	→ Avellino (loan)	8	(0)
2008	→ Perugia (loan)	13	(0)
2008–2009	→ Monza (loan)	23	(0)
2009–2010	→ Taranto (loan)	22	(2)
2011	Chernomorets Burgas	5	(0)
2011	Campobasso	19	(2)
2012–2013	Catanzaro	38	(3)
2013–2014	Mantova	26	(2)
2014–2015	Barletta	31	(1)
2015–2016	Lupa Roma	14	(1)
2016	FeralpiSalò	10	(0)
2016–2017	Maceratese	32	(11)

International career
2002–2004	Italy U-20	16	(5)
- * Club domestic league appearances and goals as of 22 November 2017

Alberto Quadri (born 9 January 1983) is an Italian footballer who last played for Maceratese as a midfielder.

In 2005, he left for Pizzighettone along with Matteo Deinite.

Quadri joined Lazio in June 2006, as part of César deal. He signed a 5-year deal.
