= Manuel Panini =

Italian footballer

Personal information
- Date of birth: 5 August 1983 (age 43)
- Place of birth: Marino, Italy
- Height: 1.80 m (5 ft 11 in)
- Position: Centre back

Team information
- Current team: Flaminia

Senior career*
Years	Team	Apps	(Gls)
2000–2004	Frosinone	10	(0)
2002–2003	→ Cavese (loan)	28	(1)
2004–2006	Cavese	40	(0)
2006–2009	Catania	0	(0)
2006–2007	→ Taranto (loan)	19	(0)
2007–2008	→ Foggia (loan)	11	(0)
2008	→ Juve Stabia (loan)	8	(0)
2009	Aversa Normanna	11	(1)
2009–2011	Paganese	39	(0)
2011	Flaminia Civita Castellana	7	(0)
2011–2013	Sarnese	50	(0)
2013–2015	Agropoli	54	(0)
2015–2019	Albalonga Calcio	129	(0)
2019–	Flaminia	0	(0)
- * Club domestic league appearances and goals

Manuel Panini (born 5 August 1983) is an Italian footballer who plays for Flaminia.

== Biography ==
Born in Marino, suburb of Rome, Panini started his career in Lazio team Frosinone. He followed team promoted to Serie C2 in 2001. In 2002, he returned to Serie D for Cavese. Cavese signed him in co-ownership deal in January 2004. In June Cavese signed him outright. He did not play in the whole 2005–06 Serie C2.

In 2006, he joined Serie A club Catania. On 6 July he left for Taranto. On 5 July 2007 he was signed by Foggia, along with Gianvito Plasmati. In January 2008 he left for Juve Stabia.

In January 2009 he terminated his contract with Catania and signed by Aversa Normanna.

On 15 September 2009 he joined Paganese. His contract was renewed on 19 August 2010.

On 17 June 2019, Panini joined Flaminia.

== Honours ==
- Serie D: 2003 (Cavese)
