= Sandro Bloudek =

Slovenian footballer (born 1986)

Personal information
- Date of birth: 16 February 1986 (age 40)
- Place of birth: Zenica, SFR Yugoslavia
- Height: 1.88 m (6 ft 2 in)
- Position: Midfielder

Youth career
- –2004: Maribor
- 2004–2006: Milan

Senior career*
Years	Team	Apps	(Gls)
2004	→ Železničar Maribor (loan)	7	(5)
2006–2009	Milan	0	(0)
2006	→ Pistoiese (loan)	6	(0)
2007	→ Cremonese (loan)	10	(1)
2007	→ Lecco (loan)	3	(0)
2008	→ Chiasso (loan)	12	(0)
2008–2009	→ Varteks (loan)	17	(0)
2009	Varteks	2	(0)
2009–2010	Šibenik	16	(0)
2010–2011	Oud-Heverlee Leuven	26	(5)
2012	Fortuna Sittard	1	(0)
2012	Široki Brijeg	3	(0)
2013–2014	Aluminij	23	(3)
2014	Heiligenkreuz am Waasen	7	(0)
2014–2016	Mettersdorf	38	(3)
2016–2017	Union Gamlitz	24	(3)
2017–2019	Bistrica	31	(0)

International career
2001	Slovenia U15	7	(3)
2004	Slovenia U18	1	(0)

Managerial career
- 2019–2021: Slaven Belupo (assistant)
- 2021–2023: Pafos (assistant)
- * Club domestic league appearances and goals

Sandro Bloudek (born 16 February 1986) is a Croatian-Slovenian football manager and former player.

== Playing career ==
In 2004, Milan signed Bloudek from Maribor. He played with the youth team and appeared as an unused substitute for the first team in the last two matches of 2004–05 Serie A season. After that he was loaned out to a series of Italian clubs before ending up with Croatian team Varteks, to which he moved on a permanent basis in 2009. After this he was signed by Šibenik, before moving to Belgian team Oud-Heverlee Leuven. With OH Leuven he enjoyed promotion from the Belgian Second Division to the Belgian Pro League, however, soon after the promotion he was released and he joined Dutch Eerste Divisie side Fortuna Sittard.

Between 2014 and 2017, he played in the 4th and 5th tiers of the Austrian football pyramid.

== Managerial career ==
Bloudek worked as an assistant, but reportedly temporarily took the reins at Cypriot side Pafos FC in April 2023, when Henning Berg was dismissed. However, he returned to his assistant role after a few days as the club announced Spaniard Michel Salgado as caretaker manager. He had joined them from Croat outfit Slaven Belupo in summer 2021.
