= Davide Saverino =

Italian footballer (born 1977)

Personal information
- Full name: Davide Saverino
- Date of birth: 20 January 1977 (age 49)
- Place of birth: Milan, Italy
- Height: 1.79 m (5 ft 10 in)
- Position: Midfielder

Senior career*
Years	Team	Apps	(Gls)
1995–2001	Varese	90	(18)
1996	→ Sanvitese (loan)	13	(0)
1997–1998	→ Verbania (loan)	30	(3)
1998–2003	Livorno	73	(9)
2004	Venezia	11	(1)
2005	Chieti	12	(1)
2005–2007	Spezia	60	(9)
2007–2008	Treviso	0	(0)
2007	→ Spezia (loan)	18	(3)
2008	→ Ascoli (loan)	14	(4)
2008–2009	Cremonese	31	(6)
2009–2011	Reggiana	53	(5)
- * Club domestic league appearances and goals

Davide Saverino (born 20 January 1977) is an Italian former footballer who played as a midfielder.

He played more than 100 games in Serie B, and also played in Serie C1, Serie C2 and Serie D.

== Career ==
Saverino started his career at Varese of Serie C2. After spending the first half of the 1996–97 season on loan with Sanvitese in Serie D, and the 1997–98 season with Verbania, also in Serie D, he returned to newly promoted Serie C1 side Varese in the summer of 1997.

He played in Serie C1 for Varese until summer 2001 signed by league rival Livorno, and won Serie B promotion next season.

In January 2004, he joined league rival Venezia. After the club faced financial problem, and limited appearances, Saverino joined Chieti of Serie C1 in January 2005, but the club almost relegated to Serie C2.

In summer 2005, Saverino moved to league rival Spezia, he followed the club to win promotion to Serie B.

In summer 2007, he was signed by league rival Treviso, but in just few days loaned back to Spezia. In January 2008, he was loaned to another Serie B club Ascoli, then later signed for Cremonese in the following season, re-joined coach Ivo Iaconi.

He plays for Reggiana during the season 2009/2010, along with Gianluca Temelin.
