= Christian Conti =

Italian footballer (born 1987)

Personal information
- Date of birth: 2 August 1987 (age 39)
- Place of birth: Rome, Italy
- Height: 1.85 m (6 ft 1 in)
- Position: Centre back

Team information
- Current team: Campus Eur 1960

Youth career
- Savio
- 2003–2006: Bari
- 2006: → Ascoli (loan)

Senior career*
Years	Team	Apps	(Gls)
2006–2012	Bari	0	(0)
2006–2007	→ Lanciano (loan)	17	(0)
2007–2008	→ Pescara (loan)	7	(0)
2008	→ Perugia (loan)	0	(0)
2008–2009	→ Verona (loan)	16	(1)
2010–2011	→ Como (loan)	36	(1)
2012	Como	6	(0)
2012–2013	Catanzaro	12	(0)
2013–2014	Casertana	8	(1)
2014–2015	Arezzo	6	(1)
2015	Virtus Francavilla	8	(0)
2015–2016	Play Eur		
2016	Ostia Mare	6	(0)
2016–	Campus Eur 1960		

International career
2007	Italy U-20 Lega Pro	1	(0)
- * Club domestic league appearances and goals as of 00:21, 7 April 2020 (UTC)

Christian Conti (born 2 August 1987) is an Italian footballer who plays for Campus Eur 1960.

== Biography ==
In July 2007, he failed to appear in the pre-season medical test for Bari. He then loaned to Pescara. In July 2008, he was signed by Verona. In January 2010 he was signed by Como after "without" a club for 6 months, which Como borrowed Conti from Bari.

In October 2015, Conti joined Virtus Francavilla but left the club two months later and joined Italian club Play Eur. In mid-October 2018, Conti returned to Campus Eur for the third time. At the end of February 2016, he then moved to Serie D club Ostia Mare. In December 2016, he returned Play Eur. The club later merged with Campus Eur and was named Campus Eur 1960 in August 2018. As of March 2019, Conti still played for Campus Eur 1960.

=== International career ===
Conti played for Italy U20 Serie C against Wales Semi-Professional team, which won 4–2. He represented Serie C1/B that losing to Serie C1/A representative team in the annual under-21 trophy.
