= Alessandro Gherardi =

Italian footballer (born 1988)

Personal information
- Full name: Alessandro Gherardi
- Date of birth: March 12, 1988 (age 38)
- Place of birth: Pontedera, Italy
- Height: 1.74 m (5 ft 9 in)
- Position: Midfielder

Team information
- Current team: Ponsacco

Youth career
- 2003–2007: Fiorentina

Senior career*
Years	Team	Apps	(Gls)
2007	Bellinzona	14	(6)
2008	AlbinoLeffe	0	(0)
2008–2009	Cremonese	9	(0)
2009	Lecco	5	(0)
2009–2010	Pergocrema	15	(4)
2010–2011	Triestina	5	(1)
2012	Nocerina	3	(1)
2012–2013	Chiasso	37	(5)
2013–2014	Messina	10	(0)
2014–2016	Carrarese	74	(6)
2016–2017	Pro Patria	25	(2)
2017–	Ponsacco	5	(1)
- * Club domestic league appearances and goals as of 25 February 2018

Alessandro Gherardi (born 12 March 1988) is an Italian footballer who currently plays as a midfielder for Ponsacco.

In August 2009 he was signed by Pergocrema.

On 31 January 2011 he was released by Triestina.
