= Ondřej Herzán =

Czech footballer

Personal information
- Date of birth: 3 March 1981 (age 45)
- Place of birth: Pardubice, Czechoslovakia
- Height: 1.74 m (5 ft 8 1/2 in)
- Position: Midfielder

Team information
- Current team: SK Dynamo České Budějovice

Youth career
- 1986–1992: Slovan Broumov
- 1992–1993: SK Náchod
- 1993–1998: SK/Dropa Pardubice

Senior career*
Years	Team	Apps	(Gls)
1998–2000	AFK Lázně Bohdaneč	44	(4)
2000–2001	FK AS Pardubice	29	(5)
2001–2004	Jablonec	82	(8)
2004–2006	Sparta Prague	14	(1)
2006–2007	Lecce	12	(0)
2007	Hellas Verona	12	(0)
2008	Spezia	18	(0)
2008–2009	SK Kladno (loan)	7	(0)
2009–	Spezia	43	(2)
2011–	Calcio Portogruaro Summaga	30	(0)

International career
2002–2003	Czech Republic U-21	4	(0)
- * Club domestic league appearances and goals as of 16 June 2009

Ondřej Herzán (born 3 March 1981 in Pardubice) is a Czech football midfielder. He currently plays for SK Dynamo České Budějovice.

== Career ==
Herzán started playing professionally in 2001, with Czech team Jablonec. In 2004, he joined Czech giants AC Sparta Prague, where he however failed to break into the first team. In September 2006 he moved to Italy, joining Serie B side Lecce, then guided by fellow Czechman Zdeněk Zeman. In 2007–08 he moved on loan to Verona in the Italian third tier Serie C1, only to leave the scaligeri' in January 2008 to join Serie B club Spezia. In his first stint with the Ligurian side, Herzán featured intermittently, and his club was ultimately relegated at the end of the season, being successively cancelled and admitted to Serie D. Herzán consequently left Italy to try his luck back to Czech Republic with Gambrinus liga club SK Kladno; after only seven appearances with that club, he however moved back to Italy in January 2009, re-joining Spezia in the Lega Pro Seconda Divisione, being part of the team that won promotion to the higher tier, Lega Pro Prima Divisione, in 2009–10.
