= Matteo Centurioni =

Italian footballer and coach

Personal information
- Date of birth: 8 May 1974 (age 52)
- Place of birth: Mestre, Italy
- Height: 1.87 m (6 ft 1 1/2 in)
- Position: Defender

Youth career
- 1992–1993: Venezia

Senior career*
| Years | Team | Apps | (Gls) |
| 1993–1995 | Venezia | 6 | (0) |
| 1993–1994 | → Corsico (loan) | 32 | (1) |
| 1995–1997 | Lecce | 32 | (0) |
| 1997–1999 | Cagliari | 22 | (0) |
| 1999–2004 | Treviso | 148 | (5) |
| 2004–2007 | Modena | 88 | (3) |
| 2007–2008 | Ravenna | 4 | (0) |
| 2008–2012 | Novara | 68 | (4) |

Managerial career
- 2019: Padova
- 2019: Luparense
- * Club domestic league appearances and goals

Matteo Centurioni (born 8 May 1974) is an Italian football coach and a former player. Centurioni played over 200 matches at Serie B.

== Playing career ==
Born in Mestre, Venice, Centurioni started his career at hometown club Venezia. He spent a season at Corsico, Milan for a small Serie D club in 1993–94 season. In 1994, he entered Venezia first team with 6 league matches.

He then played for Lecce of Serie C1, where he won the champion and followed the team to play at Serie B. He won promotion again, this time to Serie A by finished 3rd. But his Serie A debut was delayed as he was sold to Cagliari which relegated from Serie A. With Cagliari, the team also finished 3rd and promoted to the Italian top division. He played 9 league matches in his only Serie A season, and at the end of season he moved to Treviso, where he was the regular starter during his 5 years stay. He won promotion back to Serie B in 2003 after relegated in 2001.

In July 2004, he was signed by Modena F.C. in 2-year contract. Later his contract was extended and he was one of the regular starters.

In July 2007, at age 33, he was sold to Ravenna Calcio which newly promoted to Serie B. But he just played 4 time at Serie B and Ravenna relegated.

He joined Novara of Serie C1 on 31 January 2008. As a Novara player, he was protagonist of the team's double promotion from the third tier to the Serie A between 2009 and 2011.

== Coaching career ==
He worked as part of Novara coaching staff from 2012 to 2014. He successively joined Udinese as part of their youth coaching staff from 2014 to 2016, and then Venezia from 2016 to 2017.

In 2017 he was named youth coach of the Berretti team of Padova, and then of the Primavera the following season. On 18 March 2019 he was promoted as the new head coach (now in Serie B) following the dismissal of Pierpaolo Bisoli. He left Padova after the club's relegation to Serie C by the end of the season, and on 7 June 2019 he accepted a new job as the head coach of Serie D amateurs Luparense. He was dismissed by Luparense on 16 September 2019.

== Honours ==
- Serie C1 / Lega Pro Prima Divisione: 1996, 2003, 2010
