= Filippo Antonelli =

Italian footballer

Personal information
- Full name: Filippo Antonelli Agomeri
- Date of birth: 13 July 1978 (age 48)
- Place of birth: Chieti, Italy
- Height: 1.70 m (5 ft 7 in)
- Position: Midfielder

Team information
- Current team: Venezia (sporting director)

Youth career
- –1996: Torino
- 1996–1997: Monza

Senior career*
Years	Team	Apps	(Gls)
1997–1999	Monza	1	(0)
1998–1999	→ L'Aquila (loan)	26	(1)
1999–2001	Pro Patria	67	(4)
2001–2003	Cosenza	49	(3)
2003–2005	Ascoli	58	(6)
2005–2007	Chievo	1	(0)
2006	→ Messina (loan)	11	(0)
2006–2007	→ Pescara (loan)	33	(3)
2007–2009	Triestina	53	(5)
2008	→ AlbinoLeffe (loan)	11	(0)
2009–2010	Bari	4	(0)
2010	→ Torino (loan)	10	(0)
2010–2011	Triestina	35	(1)
2011–2012	Lumezzane	26	(3)
2012–2014	Reggiana	26	(1)
Total		411	(27)

Managerial career
- 2014: Pro Patria (tsporting director)
- 2015–2022: Monza (sporting director)
- 2022–: Venezia (technical director)
- * Club domestic league appearances and goals

Filippo Antonelli Agomeri (born 13 July 1978) is an Italian former footballer who played as a midfielder. He currently works as a sporting director for Serie A club Venezia.

== Football career ==
Agomeri Antonelli started his career at Monza, at that time Serie C1, after played one Serie B game for the club, he transferred to L'Aquila of Serie C2 Group C. He then moved to Pro Patria, in Serie C2 Group A.

He was signed by Cosenza in summer 2001, started his full Serie B season.

He was signed by Ascoli of Serie B in summer 2003. He won the Serie A promotion in summer 2005.

=== Chievo ===
Due to good performance in Ascoli, Chievo signed him in summer 2005, his first Serie A club. After made only one appearance, he was loaned to Messina in winter break, to help the club avoid relegation.

In summer 2006, he was loaned to Pescara Calcio. Team-mate Stefano Olivieri also joined the club in co-ownership deal.

=== Triestina ===
In July 2007, half of the registration rights was sold to Triestina for €110,000 in 2-year contract.

In January 2008, he played for U.C. AlbinoLeffe on loan. He was full contracted with Triestina in June 2008 for free.

=== Bari ===
On 20 July 2009, Bari signed the former Triestina right winger on a free transfer and until June 2011. In January 2010 he left for Torino in temporary deal, with Marco Pisano moved to Bari also in temporary deal.

=== Triestina ===
In August 2010, he returned to his former club Triestina for free, but after a good season with 33 caps and 1 goal, the club relegated in Lega Pro, his contract expired and he becomes a free agent.

=== Lega Pro ===
After the bankruptcy of Triestina, Antonelli joined Lumezzane in August 2011. In August 2012 he joined Reggiana, with Riccardo Carlini moved to opposite direction. Antonelli signed a 2-year contract.

== Managerial career ==
In May 2022, Antonelli was appointed sports director of newly promoted Serie A side Monza. He remained until 30 November 2022.
