= Matteo Serafini =

Italian footballer (born 1978)

Personal information
- Date of birth: 21 April 1978 (age 48)
- Place of birth: Brescia, Italy
- Height: 1.89 m (6 ft 2 in)
- Position: Midfielder

Youth career
- 1996–1997: Cremonese

Senior career*
| Years | Team | Apps | (Gls) |
| 1997–2001 | Cremonese | 60 | (5) |
| 2001–2002 | Livorno | 19 | (2) |
| 2003–2004 | Arezzo | 43 | (16) |
| 2004–2006 | Siena | 7 | (0) |
| 2005 | → Catania (loan) | 20 | (5) |
| 2005–2006 | → Empoli (loan) | 16 | (0) |
| 2006–2007 | Brescia | 38 | (11) |
| 2007–2009 | Vicenza | 37 | (0) |
| 2008 | → Piacenza (loan) | 17 | (3) |
| 2009–2015 | Pro Patria | 129 | (53) |
| 2015–2016 | Venezia | 32 | (20) |
| 2016–2017 | Triestina | 26 | (7) |
| 2017 | Crema | 1 | (0) |
| 2017–2018 | Ciserano | 31 | (10) |
| 2018–2019 | AC Calvina Sport | 29 | (8) |

Managerial career
- 2019: AC Calvina Sport
- 2021–2022: Feralpisalò U17
- 2023–2024: Pergolettese U19
- 2024: Fanfulla
- 2025–: Tritium
- * Club domestic league appearances and goals

Matteo Serafini (born 21 April 1978) is an Italian football coach and a former footballer who is currently as a head coach for Italian Serie D club Tritium.

== Playing career ==
Born in Brescia, Serafini started his career at Cremonese. He played his first professional season for the club in 1997–98 Serie C1, helping the club return to Serie B in just one year in summer 1998. The club was relegated again in summer 1999, and the following season saw Cremonese fall to Serie C2 in summer 2000.

In summer 2001, he joined Livorno of Serie C1. He won promotion with the club, but his just played one game in first half of 2002–03 season, before moved to Arezzo of Serie C1.

On 8 June 2004, he signed for A.C. Siena and made his Serie A debut against Palermo on 12 September 2004.

He made six more appearances before leaving on loan to Catania (Serie B) and Empoli (Serie A).

On 7 August 2006, he joined Brescia of Serie B. Here he made his biggest football career success - on 10 March 2007 he scored a spectacular hat-trick in the match between Brescia and Juventus during the season which Juventus was in Serie B: The three goals, all in the first half of the game, were the result of a lob from 40 meters, a bicycle kick, and a precise powerful shot from 30 meters, against the World Cup winner goalkeeper Gianluigi Buffon.

On 4 July 2007, he joined Vicenza of Serie B.

In 2009, he joined Aurora Pro Patria 1919.

== Coaching career ==
After retiring at the end of the 2018–19 season, Serafini was hired as manager of AC Calvina Sport. He was fired by Calvina on 7 October 2019.
