= Bruno Mota =

Swiss footballer (born 1987)

Personal information
- Full name: Bruno Fontes da Mota
- Date of birth: 24 January 1987 (age 39)
- Place of birth: Geneva, Switzerland
- Height: 1.74 m (5 ft 9 in)
- Position: Midfielder

Youth career
- 1995–2000: Athlétique Régina
- 2000–2005: Servette

Senior career*
Years	Team	Apps	(Gls)
2004–2005	Servette B	12	(0)
2005–2006	FC Chiasso	13	(0)
2006	→ Sampdoria (loan)	0	(0)
2006–2009	Sampdoria	1	(0)
2007	→ AC Bellinzona (loan)	4	(0)
2008	→ FC Chiasso (loan)	9	(0)
2008	→ Taranto (loan)	0	(0)
2009	FC Chiasso	1	(0)
2009	FC Le Mont	2	(0)
2010–2020	CS Interstar		

International career
2004	Switzerland U17	1	(0)
2006	Switzerland U19	3	(0)
2007–2008	Switzerland U21	2	(0)
- * Club domestic league appearances and goals

Bruno Fontes da Mota (born 24 January 1987) is a Swiss former footballer who played as a midfielder.

== Career ==
Bruno Mota played youth football with Athlétique Régina and Servette. He joined Italian Serie A club Sampdoria in 2006, and was subsequently loaned to AC Bellinzona (2007), FC Chiasso (2008) and Taranto Sport (2008–2009).

In January 2009, he was signed by FC Chiasso.
