= SSD Città di Gela =

Italian football club

Gela
- Full name: Società Sportiva Dilettantistica Città di Gela
- Nicknames: Aquile Reali (Royal Eagles) biancazzurro (White-Blue)
- Founded: 1975; 2006 (refounded); 2011 (refounded); 2019 (refounded)
- Ground: Stadio Vincenzo Presti, Gela, Italy
- Capacity: 4,400
- Chairman: Maurizio Melfa, Salvatore Scerra
- Manager: Mirko Fausciana
- League: Serie D
- 2025–26: Serie D/I, 9th
| Home colours | Away colours |

Gela Calcio, commonly known as just Gela, is an Italian association football club, based in Gela, Sicily, that plays in Serie D.

== History ==
Logo of Gela JT, used until 2006

The club was founded in 1975 and refounded in 2006 and 2011. Gela played 2005–2006 in Serie C1/B, but, following the bankruptcy of the club, a new society, with the current denomination, was admitted to Serie C2.

Following financial troubles it was refounded as Gela Juve-Terranova in 1995, after the merger between the old Juventina Gela and Terranova Gela, a minor team from the city and with the current name in 2006.

Gela has gained some popularity in 2005 because of its commitment against the racket, in one of the cities of Sicily where the Mafia is strongest.

In summer 2010, Gela Calcio had not won the Lega Pro Prima Divisione, however: the failure of many teams has led the repechage in this league.

In summer 2011, it does not appeal against the exclusion of Covisoc and excluded from all football. However, the club reformed in the same year and joined Terza Categoria Ragusa for 2011–12, finishing at fifth in the Group A of Ragusa division and on 27 September 2012 Gela's application for inclusion by repechage in Group I of Sicilian Seconda Categoria was accepted. The club was admitted to Prima Categoria Sicily before the 2013–14 season.

On 23 February 2014, 4 days before the season ended Gela won the championship of Prima Categoria Sicily Group H and was promoted to Promozione Sicily. On 17 April 2016, Gela won the championship of Eccellenza Sicily Group A and was promoted to 2016–17 Serie D.

On 25 June 2019, the team failed, returning to the Seconda Categoria. In 2020 the team was promoted in Prima Categoria. In 2023 the team is playing in Eccellenza, fifth division in the Italian soccer system.
