= 2004–2010 Italian football scandal =

Scandal over alleged false accounting

The 2004–2010 Italian football scandal, also known as Caso Plusvalenze, was a scandal over alleged false accounting at Italian football clubs. The investigation started in 2004 and concluded in 2010.

== Background ==
In the early 2000s, various Italian football clubs declared bankruptcy as benefactors withdrew financial support. Investigations found a widespread culture of illegality. Involved football clubs included A.C. Fiorentina (2002), Monza (2004), S.S.C. Napoli (2004), Ancona Calcio (2004), Torino Calcio (2005), A.C. Perugia (2005), Como (2005), Reggiana (2005), Salernitana Sport (2005) and A.C. Venezia (2005). In addition, Parma went into administration (bankruptcy) and was re-founded as Parma Football Club S.p.A. (2004).

Previously, some of these clubs profited by cross-trading players using the football transfer market, wherein multiple players were exchanged between clubs, generally involving monetary consideration. This practice typically resulted in short-term financial benefit for the clubs, but in the long run it increased expenditure through 'amortisation,' (the counterpart for tangible assets is depreciation) of players' financial value. In February 2003, a law was passed that allowed clubs to defer amortisation expenses (Italian Law 91/1981, Article 18B), and avoid recapitalisation through negative equity. Despite the law, many clubs continued to practice cross-trading in order to raise the short-term profit required to meet financial criteria for the 2003– 2004 season. The law was declared unconstitutional in 2005, which caused some clubs to recapitalize and remove their amortisation fund by 30 June 2007. As a result, the clubs had to overcome yet another capital shortfall, which later created controversy when re-evaluating their brand and mortgages to banks.

Scandals also involved inaccurate dating of profits obtained via player transfers. For example, in July 2001 Roma sold their Japanese international midfielder Hidetoshi Nakata for 55 billion lire, but the club documented the profit in their accounts for the 2000–01 season, claiming that the deal was agreed to before the cut-off of the financial year, which was 30 June 2001 for most clubs.

Before 2003, when cross-trading was prevalent, many injustices became evident. Examples include deals involving Giuseppe Colucci and Alberto Maria Fontana (Roma–Verona, both 12.5 billion lire fee); and an exchange that involved Amedeo Mangone, Paolo Poggi and Sergei Gurenko for Diego Fuser, Raffaele Longo and Saliou Lassissi (Roma–Parma, both 65 billion lire transfer fees in total).

Other deals included those of Matuzalém and an anonymous player (Parma–Napoli, both 14 billion lire); Manuele Blasi and Giuseppe Cattivera (Roma–Perugia, both 18 billion lire); Paolo Ginestra and Matteo Bogani (Milan–Inter); Giammarco Frezza and Alessandro Frau (Inter–Roma, both 8.8 billion lire) in 2001; Vratislav Greško and Matías Almeyda (Inter–Parma, both €16M fee); Luigi Sartor and Sebastiano Siviglia (Parma-Roma, both around €9M fee); Francesco Coco and Clarence Seedorf (Milan–Inter, both €29M fee); Davide Bombardini and Franco Brienza (Palermo–Roma, 50% rights both €5.5M fee); Gabriele Paoletti and Luigi Panarelli for Fontana–Frezza (Torino–Roma, 50% rights both €10.5M fee) in 2002; Rubén Maldonado and Gonzalo Martínez in January 2003.

The scandal was a culmination of the period that the Italian media dubbed doping amministrativo (doping[-like] administration), bilanciopoli (balance sheet scandal), plusvalenze fittizie or plusvalenze fai-da-te (DIY profit). Bologna chairman Giuseppe Gazzoni Frascara proclaimed his innocence and reported false accounting to the Italian Football Federation. Bologna, however, was also involved in cross-trading, as when the remaining 50% rights of Jonatan Binotto were acquired from Juventus by selling Giacomo Cipriani, Alessandro Gamberini and Alex Pederzoli in 2000 for the same total transfer fee, and for selling Binotto to Internazionale for Fabio Macellari in 2001.

== The trading ==
Since the Italian Football Federation was unable to prove that the football clubs intended to "flop" the price of mature footballers, only deals involving youth players were punished.

Players received		Fee
June 2003
Milan	Chiveo	
Martino Olivetti (50%) + €0.1M	Paolo Sammarco (50%)	€1.1M
Milan	Internazionale	
Matteo Deinite (50%) + €0.25M	Salvatore Ferraro (50%)	€1.75M
Matteo Giordano (50%) + €0.225M	Alessandro Livi (50%)	€1.725M
Ronny Diuk Toma (50%) + €0.25M	Giuseppe Ticli (50%)	€1.75M
Simone Brunelli (50%) + €0.25M	Marco Varaldi (50%)	€1.75M
Milan	Parma	
Roberto Massaro (50%)	Marco Donadel (50%)	€2M
Filippo Porcari (50%)	Mirko Stefani (50%)	€1M
Luca Ferretti (50%)	Davide Favaro (50%)	€1M
Milan	Sampdoria	Fee
Ikechukwu Kalu (50%) + €1M cash	Luca Antonini (50%)	€2M
Torino	Ternana	
Emanuele Calaiò (redeem 50%)	Alessandro Cibocchi (redeem 50%)	
July 2003
Reggina	Udinese	
Gonzalo Martínez (50%)	Alessandro Pierini	
Andrea Sottil (50%)	Alessandro Pierini	
January 2004
Genoa	Udinese	
Mohammed Gargo (50%)	Valon Behrami (50%)	
Vittorio Micolucci (50%)	Rodrigue Boisfer (50%)	

== The investigation ==
In 2004, Roma and Lazio, followed by Milan and Internazionale, were investigated for false accounting. Moreover, the liquidator of Como pointed out its failure to Preziosi. The accusation suggested that the owner transferred Como's assets to Genoa at an uneconomical price. On A.C. Fiorentina's side, the liquidator from the Court of Florence found that the date of player profit and cross-trading were wrong on the balance sheet. Perugia's failure was also under investigation. The fall of Spezia Calcio was also linked to its previous owner Internazionale.

A separate charge related to Brunelli's was exposed in 2007; Brunelli claimed that the transfer document did not contain his signature and that he knew nothing when he was transferred from Milan to Internazionale. Brunelli was banned for two months from football, even though he was retired at the time. Brunelli's agent was charged and dismissed, and Brunelli sued Internazionale for negligence, forcing Brunelli to retire. This trial was also dismissed. Lazio was acquitted in 2007 along with Juventus. Roma was fined by the court of Rome.

In January 2007, the prosecutor exposed the alleged false account of Crespo (cash-plus player swap) and Domenico Morfeo (failure of Fiorentina). During an ongoing investigation of Parma, a football player, Amauri, was signed by Parma from Napoli as a free agent, but a massive agent fee was also paid. Amauri did not have EU citizenship and Italian clubs were commonly buying the non-EU registration quota from other clubs.

While the clubs sold the brand to their subsidiaries and mortgaged them, such as Inter Milan on "Inter Brand", A.C. Milan on "Milan Entertainment", A.S. Roma on "Soccer S.A.S. di Brand Management", and "S.S. Lazio Marketing & Communication S.p.A.", the move prompted Guardia di Finanza to visit Co.Vi.Soc. of Italian Football Federation to collect information. However, no further action was taken.

== Sporting Sentences ==
The following punishments were given to individuals:

AC Milan

- The company: €90,000 fine.
- Adriano Galliani (Vice-chairman): €60,000 fine.

Internazionale

- The company: €90,000 fine.
- Massimo Moratti (Owner) €10,000 fine.
- Gabriele Oriali (technical director) €10,000 fine.
- Mauro Gambaro (ex-CEO) €20,000 fine.
- Rinaldo Ghelfi (ex-CEO and by-then vice-chairman) €20,000 fine.

Sampdoria

- The company: €36,000 fine.
- Giuseppe Marotta (director): €20,000 fine.
- Riccardo Garrone (owner and chairman): €18,000 fine.

Genoa

- The company: €400,000 fine.
- Giovanni Blondet: €15,000 fine.
- Enrico Preziosi (owner and chairman): Banned 4 months and €15,000 fine.

Reggina

- The company: €400,000 fine.
- Pasquale Foti: Banned 1 month and €20,000 fine.

Udinese

- The company: €400,000 fine.
- Franco Soldati (chairman): Banned 3 months and €30,000 fine.
- Pierpaolo Marino (by-then vice-chairman): €15,000 fine.

Chievo

- The company: €50,000 fine.
- Luca Campedelli (owner): €40,000 fine.
- Giovanni Sartori (director of sports): €15,000 fine.

Parma

- Stefano Tanzi (chairman): Banned 6 months, €10,000 fine.

Palermo

- Maurizio Zamparini (owner and chairman): Banned 6 months
- Rino Foschi (director of sports): Banned 3 months

Ternana

- The company: €20,000 fine.
- Luigi Agarini (chairman): Banned 7 months
- Luca Ferramosca (chairman): Banned 6 months
- Giovanni Lombardo (CEO, Italian: Amministratore Delegato): Banned 3 months
- Stefano Dominicis(CEO, Italian: Amministratore Unico): Banned 6 months

=== Caso Como–Genoa ===
- Enrico Preziosi Banned 5 years
- Massimo D'Alma Banned 3 years
- Aleardo Luciano Guido Dall'Oglio Banned 6 months
- Genoa: €150,000 fine.

== Aftermath ==
Sampdoria denied any wrongdoing in the Kalu–Antonini transfer. Zamparini, the chairman of Palermo, insisted that the fine was heavy, as the cross-trading was under previous ownership (Sensi). The club chose to defer to amortize the €10 million transfer fee of Franco Brienza (like every other club on flopped signing prior to 2002), instead of writing off €10 million immediately in order to appear in the 2002–03 financial year.

Failure to recapitalize and balance sheet related scandals still occurred, namely Treviso, S.S.C. Venezia, Gallipoli Acireale, Pergocrema and board members of the clubs were given heavy fines.

Some research had criticized the effectiveness of the indicators of FIGC's Covisoc on the actual financial health of the football club.

== See also ==
- List of Italian football transfers summer 2000 (co-ownership)
- List of Italian football transfers summer 2001 (co-ownership)
