= List of Italian football transfers summer 2007 (co-ownership) =

== Co-ownership resolve ==
Date	Name	Team1	Team2	Result	Fee
19 June 2007	Robert Acquafresca	Treviso	Internazionale	Internazionale	€1.5M
20 June 2007	Niky Agnorelli	CuoioCappiano	Empoli	Renewed	
20 June 2007	Giovanni Amodeo	Teramo	Ascoli	Renewed	
25 June 2007	Luigi Anaclerio	Verona	Bari	ND (Verona)	
20 June 2007	Maurizio Anastasi	Cesena	Catania	Cesena	€1,000
20 June 2007	Luca Antonini	Sampdoria	Milan	Milan	€1M
20 June 2007	Giuseppe Aquino	Cavese	Frosinone	Renewed	
20 June 2007	Mario Artistico	Cisco Roma	Udinese	Renewed	
25 June 2007	Antonio Balzano	Rieti	Bari	ND	
25 June 2007	Giovanni Bartolucci	Siena	Juventus	ND (Siena)	Free
26 June 2007	Eder Baù	Spezia	Pescara	Spezia	Auction, €30,000
25 June 2007	Nicola Beati	Arezzo	Internazionale	ND (Arezzo)	
26 June 2007	Luca Belingheri	AlbinoLeffe	Ascoli	Ascoli	Auction, €157,000
25 June 2007	Tommaso Bellazzini	Pistoiese	Fiorentina	ND (Pistoiese)	
19 June 2007	Simone Bentivoglio	Chievo	Juventus	Chievo	€500,000
20 June 2007	Matteo Berretti	Potenza	Siena	Potenza	€20,000
31 July 2007	Marco Bernacci	Mantova	Cesena	Cesena	€1.4M
25 June 2007	Mirko Bertoncini	Sangiovannese	Empoli	ND	
26 June 2007	Alberto Bianchi	Grosseto	Spezia	Spezia	Auction, Undisclosed
20 June 2007	Antonio Bocchetti	Parma	Piacenza	Parma	€220,000
20 June 2007	Massimo Bonanni	Sampdoria	Palermo	Renewed	
25 June 2007	Liborio Bongiovanni	Pro Sesto	Torino	ND	
19 June 2007	Leonardo Bonucci	Treviso	Internazionale	Renewed	
25 June 2007	Antonino Bonvissuto	Manfredonia	Vicenza	ND	
25 June 2007	Pierluigi Borghetti	Crotone	Brescia	ND	
25 June 2007	Roberto Bortolotto	Biellese	Chievo	ND	
26 June 2007	Davide Bottone	Varese	Torino	Torino	Auction, Undisclosed
20 June 2007	Viktor Budyanskiy (Russia)	Ascoli	Juventus	Ascoli	€900,000
25 June 2007	Andrea Briotti	Sassuolo	Roma	ND (Sassuolo)	
26 June 2007	Davide Brivio	Atalanta	Fiorentina	Atalanta	Auction, €516,000
20 June 2007	Salvatore Bruno	Modena	Chievo	Renewed	
25 June 2007	Ivan Buonocunto	Prato	Udinese	ND (Prato)	
20 June 2007	Carlo Maria Caligiuri	Andria	Frosinone	Frosinone	Undisclosed
25 June 2007	Matteo Camillini	Bellaria	Cesena	ND	
25 June 2007	Cristiano Camillucci	Sansovino	Arezzo	ND	
25 June 2007	Alfonso Camorani	Treviso	Lecce	ND	
20 June 2007	Giorgio Cantele	Pavia	Torino	Renewed	
25 June 2007	Manuel Caponi	Prato	Empoli	ND	
20 June 2007	Davide Carcuro	Fiorentina	Treviso	Renewed	
20 June 2007	Davide Caremi	AlbinoLeffe	Chievo	Renewed	
20 June 2007	Alfredo Cariello	Crotone	Chievo	Chievo	€4,000
26 June 2007	Filippo Carobbio	Genoa	AlbinoLeffe	AlbinoLeffe	Auction, €200,000
26 June 2007	Lorenzo Carotti	Cremonese	Parma	Cremonese	Auction, €110,000
6 June 2007	Moris Carrozzieri	Atalanta	Sampdoria	Atalanta	€870,000
26 June 2007	Marco Cassetti	Roma	Lecce	Roma	Auction, €851,500
19 June 2007	Matteo Cavagna	Ravenna	Juventus	Renewed	
20 June 2007	Luca Ceccarelli	Internazionale	Milan	Renewed	
26 June 2007	César	Catania	Chievo	Chievo	Auction, €440,000
25 June 2007	Elia Chianese	Lecco	Piacenza	ND	
25 June 2007	Daniele Chiarini	Pisa	Arezzo	ND	
19 June 2007	Michael Cia	Atalanta	South Tyrol	Renewed	
26 June 2007	Giampaolo Ciarcià	Ternana	Crotone	Ternana	Auction, Undisclosed
25 June 2007	Manuel Cilona	Legnano	Atalanta	ND (Legnano)	
25 June 2007	Luigi Cipriani	Cavese	Frosinone	ND (Cavese)	
26 June 2007	Andrea Coda	Udinese	Empoli	Udinese	Auction, Undisclosed
20 June 2007	Paul Codrea	Siena	Palermo	Siena	€200,000
25 June 2007	Corrado Colombo	Spezia	Sampdoria	Renewed	
20 June 2007	Giuseppe Colucci	Catania	Verona	Renewed	
26 June 2007	Gianluca Comotto	Torino	Roma	Torino	Auction, €1.525M
20 June 2007	Alex Cordaz	Treviso	Internazionale	Renewed	
20 June 2007	Luca Corradi	Venezia	Chievo	Renewed	
20 June 2007	Daniele Corvia	Siena	Roma	Siena	€375,000
25 June 2007	Alessio Cossu	Ravenna	Cagliari	ND (Ravenna)	
20 June 2007	Claudio Costanzo	Cisco Roma	Ascoli	Renewed	
20 June 2007	Marcello Cottafava	Lecce	Treviso	Lecce	Undisclosed
31 August 2007	Giuseppe Cozzolino	Chievo	Lecce	Lecce	€260,000
20 June 2007	Yuri Croceri	Pizzighettone	Chievo	Renewed	
25 June 2007	Rocco D'Aiello	Gela	Palermo	ND (Gela)	Free
25 June 2007	Pasquale D'Aniello	Torres	Bologna	ND	
20 June 2007	Umberto Del Core	Cesena	Catania	Catania	€1,000
20 June 2007	Marco Dalla Costa	Pro Sesto	Internazionale	Renewed	
26 June 2007	Guido Di Deo	Frosinone	Ternana	Ternana	Undisclosed
26 June 2007	Andrea De Falco	Pescara	Fiorentina	Pescara	€500
25 June 2007	Antonino Di Franco	Gela	Palermo	ND (Gela)	Free
25 June 2007	Manuele Del Nero	Carrarese	Spezia	Renewed	
18 June 2007	Luigi Della Rocca	Triestina	Bologna	Renewed	
26 June 2007	Salvatore Del Sole	Sanremese	Parma	Parma	Undisclosed
20 June 2007	Mattia De Stefano	Pavia	Torino	Renewed	
19 June 2007	Tomas Danilevičius	Bologna	Livorno	Renewed	
20 June 2007	Ciro Danucci	Cesena	Catania	Catania	€1,000
25 June 2007	Ivan Dazzi	Castelnuovo	Spezia	Spezia	Undisclosed
15 June 2007	Matteo Deinite	Internazionale	Milan	Internazionale	€250,000
20 June 2007	Roberto Delgado	Potenza	Lazio	Potenza	€20,000
20 June 2007	Mahamet Diagouraga	Sambenedettese	Chievo	Chievo	Undisclosed
8 June 2007	Modibo Diakité	Lazio	Pescara	Lazio	€250,000
20 June 2007	Domenico Falco	Massese	Ascoli	Renewed	
15 June 2007	Salvatore Ferraro	Milan	Internazionale	Milan	€300,000
26 June 2007	Luca Fiuzzi	CuoioCappiano	Empoli	Empoli	Auction, Undisclosed
20 June 2007	Daniele Gastaldello	Siena	Juventus	Juventus	€650,000
26 June 2007	Carlo Gervasoni	Bari	Verona	Verona	Auction, Undisclosed
15 June 2007	Matteo Giordano	Internazionale	Milan	Internazionale	€50,000
20 June 2007	Angelo Iorio	Piacenza	Cremonese	Renewed	
24 July 2007	Abdoulay Konko	Siena	Genoa	Genoa	€376,213
20 June 2007	Fabio Lebran	Carrarese	Parma	Parma	Undisclosed
26 June 2007	Stephen Makinwa (Nigeria)	Lazio	Palermo	Lazio	Auction, €3.3M
26 June 2007	Andrea Masiello	Siena	Genoa	Genoa	Auction, €1.08 million
15 June 2007	Roberto Massaro	Milan	Parma	Milan	€90,000
20 June 2007	Cristian Molinaro	Siena	Juventus	Juventus	€2.5M
20 June 2007	Antonio Nocerino	Piacenza	Juventus	Juventus	€3.7M
26 June 2007	Devis Nossa	San Marino	Internazionale	Internazionale	Auction, peppercorn
26 June 2007	Stefano Olivieri	Pescara	Chievo	Chievo	Auction, €37,500
20 June 2007	Biagio Pagano	Rimini	Sampdoria	Rimini	€220,000
20 June 2007	Luca Palazzo	Pro Sesto	Internazionale	ND (Pro Sesto)	Free
20 June 2007	Marco Parolo	Pistoiese	Chievo	Chievo	€15,000
20 June 2007	Mirko Pieri	Sampdoria	Udinese	Renewed	–
20 June 2007	Fabio Piroli	Taranto	Torino	Renewed	
20 June 2007	David Pizarro (Chile)	Roma	Internazionale	Roma	€5.75M
20 June 2007	Julien Rantier	Piacenza	Vicenza	Piacenza	€500,000
20 June 2007	Angelo Rea	Messina	Cesena	Messina	Undisclosed
20 June 2007	Pierre Giorgio Regonesi	Rimini	AlbinoLeffe	Renewed	–
20 June 2007	Francesco Renzetti	Lucchese	Genoa	Renewed	
20 June 2007	(Brazil) Gleison Santos	AlbinoLeffe	Monza	AlbinoLeffe	€360,000
26 June 2007	Antonino Saviano	Cassino	Chievo	Chievo	Auction, Undisclosed
25 June 2007	Matteo Scapini	Portogruaro	Vicenza	ND (Portogruaro)	
20 June 2007	Daniel Semenzato	Montichiari	Internazionale	ND (Montichiari)	Free
15 June 2007	Giuseppe Ticli	Milan	Internazionale	Milan	€100,000
20 June 2007	Alessandro Tulli	Lecce	Roma	Renewed	
20 June 2007	Blažej Vaščák	Lecce	Treviso	Lecce	Undisclosed
20 June 2007	Emanuele Volpara	Lucchese	Genoa	Renewed	
20 June 2007	Marco Zaninelli	Cesena	Treviso	Treviso	peppercorn
