= 2002–03 Parma AC season =

Parma
2002–03 season
- Owner: Parmalat
- President: Stefano Tanzi
- Manager: Cesare Prandelli
- Stadium: Stadio Ennio Tardini
- Serie A: 5th
- Supercoppa Italiana: Runners-up
- Coppa Italia: Second round
- UEFA Cup: Second round
- Top goalscorer: League: Adrian Mutu (18); All: Adrian Mutu (22)
- Average home league attendance: 16,306
Home colours	Away colours	Third colours

Parma Associazione Calcio regained its respect following a lacklustre Serie A and Champions League performance the year before. Under new coach Cesare Prandelli, Parma played an offensive 4–3–3 formation, in which new offensive signings Adrian Mutu and Adriano starred. Both made up for the departure of Marco Di Vaio to Juventus. Mutu scored 18 goals from the left wing, and Parma accepted a multimillion-pound offer from Chelsea in the summer, which meant the Romanian international only spent a year at the club. Also impressing were goalkeeper Sébastien Frey and young centre-halves Matteo Ferrari and Daniele Bonera, who proved to be acceptable replacements for departed captain Fabio Cannavaro, who had joined Inter in late August 2002.

Parma finished fifth in Serie A and missed out on Champions League qualification to Lazio by four points. It had the upper hand on Udinese for fifth on goal difference, and was one point clear of Chievo in seventh. That solitary point qualified Parma for European football in 2003–04. Parma also spent part of pre-season playing in the 2002 Amsterdam Tournament.

== Players ==
=== Squad information ===
Note: Flags indicate national team as defined under FIFA eligibility rules; some limited exceptions apply. Players may hold more than one non-FIFA nationality.

No.	Pos.	Nation	Player
1	GK	FRA	Sébastien Frey
2	DF	ITA	Aimo Diana
3	DF	ITA	Giuseppe Cardone
4	DF	SVK	Vratislav Gresko
5	DF	ITA	Daniele Bonera
6	MF	ITA	Simone Barone
7	MF	ITA	Marco Marchionni
8	MF	FRA	Sabri Lamouchi
9	FW	BRA	Adriano
10	MF	JPN	Hidetoshi Nakata
11	FW	ITA	Emiliano Bonazzoli
13	DF	ARG	Gabriel Oyola
14	DF	ITA	Stefano Torrisi
16	DF	BRA	Júnior

No.	Pos.	Nation	Player
17	MF	ITA	Emanuele Filippini
18	FW	ITA	Alberto Gilardino
19	FW	ITA	Roberto Massaro
20	FW	ROU	Adrian Mutu
21	DF	ITA	Matteo Ferrari
22	GK	BRA	Cláudio Taffarel
23	MF	AUS	Mark Bresciano
24	DF	ITA	Sebastiano Siviglia
25	GK	ITA	Alfonso De Lucia
26	MF	ITA	Matteo Brighi
27	DF	ITA	Antonio Benarrivo
28	DF	ITA	Paolo Cannavaro
29	MF	ITA	Massimo Donati

=== Transfers ===
In
Pos.	Name	from	Type
FW	Adriano	Internazionale	co-ownership
DF	Vratislav Gresko	Internazionale	
FW	Adrian Mutu	Hellas Verona	
FW	Alberto Gilardino	Hellas Verona	
DF	Paolo Cannavaro	Hellas Verona	
MF	Matteo Brighi	Bologna F.C.	
DF	Daniele Bonera	Brescia Calcio	
MF	Emanuele Filippini	Brescia Calcio	
MF	Simone Barone	Chievo Verona	
MF	Mark Bresciano	Empoli F.C.	
MF	Massimo Donati	A.C. Milan	
DF	Sebastiano Siviglia	A.S. Roma	
FW	Savo Milosevic	Real Zaragoza	loan ended
FW	Patrick M'Boma	Sunderland F.C.	loan ended
DF	Gabriel Oyola	Talleres de Cordoba	

Out
Pos.	Name	To	Type
DF	Fabio Cannavaro	Internazionale	
MF	Matias Almeyda	Internazionale	
FW	Marco Di Vaio	Juventus	
DF	Martin Djetou	Fulham F.C.	loan
MF	Alain Boghossian	RCD Espanyol	
DF	Luigi Sartor	A.S. Roma	
MF	Johan Micoud	Werder Bremen	
DF	Nestor Sensini	Udinese Calcio	
FW	Hakan Sukur	Blackburn Rovers	
MF	Jorge Bolaño	Sampdoria	loan
MF	Stephen Appiah	Brescia Calcio	loan
FW	Savo Milosevic	RCD Espanyol	loan
DF	Stefano Torrisi	Reggina Calcio	
FW	Patrick M'Boma	Al-Ittihad	
DF	Sergey Gurenko	Piacenza Calcio	
MF	Giampiero Maini	Ancona Calcio	

==== Winter ====
In
Pos.	Name	from	Type
DF	Giuseppe Cardone	Piacenza Calcio	
DF	Alessandro Pierini	Reggina Calcio	
MF	Johnnier Montaño	Piacenza Calcio	

Out
Pos.	Name	To	Type
DF	Vratislav Gresko	Blackburn Rovers	loan
FW	Emiliano Bonazzoli	Reggina	
MF	Massimo Donati	Torino	
DF	Aimo Diana	Reggina Calcio	
MF	Marco Marchionni	Piacenza Calcio	
DF	Sebastiano Siviglia	Atalanta B.C.	

== Competitions ==
=== Supercoppa Italiana ===
25 August 2002	Juventus	2–1	Parma	Tripoli, Libya
21:00 CEST (UTC+02:00)	Del Piero 38', 73'		Di Vaio 64'	Stadium: June 11 Stadium; Attendance: 40,000; Referee: Stefano Farina

=== Serie A ===
==== League table ====
Pos	Team	Pld	W	D	L	GF	GA	GD	Pts	Qualification or relegation
3	Milan (Note: Milan qualified for the Champions League group stage as defending champions.)	34	18	7	9	55	30	+25	61	Qualification to Champions League group stage
4	Lazio	34	15	15	4	57	32	+25	60	Qualification to Champions League third qualifying round
5	Parma	34	15	11	8	55	36	+19	56 (Note: Parma finished ahead of Udinese on head-to-head points: Udinese 1–1 Parma, Parma 3–2 Udinese.)	Qualification to UEFA Cup first round
6	Udinese	34	16	8	10	38	35	+3	56	Qualification to UEFA Cup first round
7	Chievo	34	16	7	11	51	39	+12	55	

Source: 2002–03 Serie A, Soccerway
Rules for classification: 1) Points; 2) Head-to-head points; 3) Head-to-head goal difference; 4) Goal difference; 5) Goals scored; 6) Draw. (Note: Head-to-head record is used only after all the matches between the teams in question have been played).

==== Results summary ====
Overall								Home						Away					
Pld	W	D	L	GF	GA	GD	Pts	W	D	L	GF	GA	GD	W	D	L	GF	GA	GD
34	15	11	8	55	36	+19	56	11	2	4	31	19	+12	4	9	4	24	17	+7

Last updated: 24 May 2003.
Source: Competitive matches

==== Results by round ====
Round	1	2	3	4	5	6	7	8	9	10	11	12	13	14	15	16	17	18	19	20	21	22	23	24	25	26	27	28	29	30	31	32	33	34
Ground	H	A	H	A	H	A	H	H	A	A	H	A	H	A	H	A	H	A	H	A	H	A	H	A	A	H	H	A	H	A	H	A	H	A
Result	W	D	W	D	D	L	W	L	D	L	W	W	W	L	L	D	W	D	W	D	L	W	D	D	W	W	W	L	W	D	L	D	W	W
Position	9	5	8	7	11	8	9	7	9	11	8	7	7	7	9	8	7	8	6	7	7	7	7	6	6	5	5	5	5	5	6	6	6	5

Source: Competitive matches
A = Away; H = Home; W = Win; D = Draw; L = Loss; = Leader, 2003-04 UEFA Champions League group stage; = 2003-04 UEFA Champions League group stage; = 2003-04 UEFA Champions League qualifying round; = 2003-04 UEFA Cup; = 2003-04 Serie B

==== Matches ====
15 September 2002 1	Udinese	1–1	Parma	Udine
15:00 CEST	Alberto 54'	Report	Adriano 24'	Stadium: Stadio Friuli; Attendance: 15,636; Referee: Paolo Dondarini

22 September 2002 2	Parma	2–0	Como	Parma
15:00 CEST	Lamouchi 14'; Adriano 47'	Report		Stadium: Stadio Ennio Tardini; Attendance: 15,831; Referee: Fiorenzo Treossi

28 September 2002 3	Juventus	2–2	Parma	Turin
18:00 CEST	Tudor 87'; Del Piero 90+5'	Report	Nakata 66'; Adriano 81'	Stadium: Stadio delle Alpi; Attendance: 38,993; Referee: Stefano Cassarà

6 October 2002 4	Parma	2–2	Perugia	Parma
15:00 CEST	Mutu 20'; Donati 53'	Report	Tedesco 64', 72'	Stadium: Stadio Ennio Tardini; Attendance: 13,177; Referee: Massimiliano Saccani

20 October 2002 5	Modena	2–1	Parma	Modena
20:30 CEST	Fabbrini 67'; Kamara 85'	Report	Mutu 41'	Stadium: Stadio Alberto Braglia; Attendance: 14,741; Referee: Pasquale Rodomonti

27 October 2002 6	Parma	2–1	Atalanta	Parma
15:00 CET	Nakata 14'; Mutu 71'	Report	Comandini 85'	Stadium: Stadio Ennio Tardini; Attendance: 13,476; Referee: Emilio Pellegrino

3 November 2002 7	Parma	0–1	Chievo	Parma
20:30 CET		Report	Pellissier 90+4'	Stadium: Stadio Ennio Tardini; Attendance: 13,358; Referee: Daniele Tombolini

6 November 2002 8	Parma	4–3	Brescia	Parma
20:30 CET	Ferrari 15'; Mutu 27'; Bonazzoli 53'; Gilardino 74'	Report	Appiah 14'; R. Baggio 25', 60' (pen.)	Stadium: Stadio Ennio Tardini; Attendance: 14,952; Referee: Emidio Morganti

10 November 2002 9	Lazio	0–0	Parma	Rome
15:00 CET		Report		Stadium: Stadio Olimpico; Attendance: 37,155; Referee: Domenico Messina

17 November 2002 10	Milan	2–1	Parma	Milan
15:00 CET	Pirlo 48' (pen.), 70' (pen.)	Report	Filippini 63'	Stadium: San Siro; Attendance: 59,648; Referee: Paolo Bertini

24 November 2002 11	Parma	3–0	Roma	Parma
15:00 CET	Bonazzoli 10', 72'; Mutu 22' (pen.)	Report		Stadium: Stadio Ennio Tardini; Attendance: 17,223; Referee: Pierluigi Collina

1 December 2002 12	Torino	0–4	Parma	Turin
15:00 CET		Report	Brighi 15'; Mutu 24'; Adriano 49', 67'	Stadium: Stadio delle Alpi; Attendance: 12,718; Referee: Marco Gabriele

8 December 2002 13	Parma	2–0	Reggina	Parma
15:00 CET	Adriano 57', 79'	Report		Stadium: Stadio Ennio Tardini; Attendance: 14,398; Referee: Alfredo Trentalange

14 December 2002 14	Bologna	2–1	Parma	Bologna
20:30 CET	Cruz 42', 44'	Report	Adriano 28'	Stadium: Stadio Renato Dall'Ara; Attendance: 21,717; Referee: Alfredo Trentalange

22 December 2002 15	Parma	1–2	Internazionale	Parma
20:30 CET	Zanetti 55' (o.g.)	Report	Di Biagio 37'; Recoba 75'	Stadium: Stadio Ennio Tardini; Attendance: 21,133; Referee: Pierluigi Collina

12 January 2003 16	Piacenza	1–1	Parma	Piacenza
15:00 CET	Tosto 46'	Report	Mutu 28'	Stadium: Stadio Leonardo Garilli; Attendance: 7,080; Referee: Pasquale Rodomonti

18 January 2003 17	Parma	2–0	Empoli	Parma
18:00 CET	Gilardino 58'; Mutu 82'	Report		Stadium: Stadio Ennio Tardini; Attendance: 14,542; Referee: Pierluigi Collina

26 January 2003 18	Brescia	1–1	Parma	Brescia
15:00 CET	Baggio 39'	Report	Bonera 22'	Stadium: Stadio Mario Rigamonti; Attendance: 14,221; Referee: Stefano Farina

2 February 2003 19	Parma	3–2	Udinese	Parma
15:00 CET	Adriano 11'; Barone 56'; Nakata 85'	Report	Pizarro 57'; Jankulovski 90+2'	Stadium: Stadio Ennio Tardini; Attendance: 12,980; Referee: Pasquale Rodomonti

9 February 2003 20	Como	2–2	Parma	Piacenza
15:00 CET	Grosso 66'; Amoruso 78'	Report	Mutu 30' (pen.), 88' (pen.)	Stadium: Stadio Leonardo Garilli; Attendance: 6,400; Referee: Luca Palanca

16 February 2003 21	Parma	1–2	Juventus	Parma
15:00 CET	Mutu 90'	Report	Di Vaio 13'; Tacchinardi 30'	Stadium: Stadio Ennio Tardini; Attendance: 23,451; Referee: Emilio Pellegrino

23 February 2003 22	Perugia	1–2	Parma	Perugia
20:30 CET	Grosso 51'	Report	Adriano 30'; Ferrari 72'	Stadium: Stadio Renato Curi; Attendance: 7,197; Referee: Paolo Bertini

1 March 2003 23	Parma	1–1	Modena	Parma
20:30 CET	Adriano 28'	Report	Scoponi 30'	Stadium: Stadio Ennio Tardini; Attendance: 16,881; Referee: Pasquale Rodomonti

9 March 2003 24	Atalanta	0–0	Parma	Bergamo
15:00 CET		Report		Stadium: Stadio Atleti Azzurri d'Italia; Attendance: 14,994; Referee: Roberto Rosetti

16 March 2003 25	Chievo	0–4	Parma	Verona
15:00 CET		Report	Mutu 6'; Nakata 59'; Lamouchi 67'; Gilardino 90+1'	Stadium: Stadio Marc'Antonio Bentegodi; Attendance: 13,983; Referee: Cosimo Bolognino

23 March 2003 26	Parma	2–1	Lazio	Parma
15:00 CET	Cardone 4'; Adriano 90+2'	Report	Stanković 50'	Stadium: Stadio Ennio Tardini; Attendance: 15,732; Referee: Domenico Messina

5 April 2003 27	Parma	1–0	Milan	Parma
20:30 CEST	Adriano 77'	Report		Stadium: Stadio Ennio Tardini; Attendance: 25,603; Referee: Stefano Farina

13 April 2003 28	Roma	2–1	Parma	Rome
15:00 CEST	Totti 45'; Guigou 73'	Report	Adriano 40'	Stadium: Stadio Olimpico; Attendance: 55,320; Referee: Matteo Trefoloni

19 April 2003 29	Parma	1–0	Torino	Parma
15:00 CEST	Mutu 75' (pen.)	Report		Stadium: Stadio Ennio Tardini; Attendance: 14,709; Referee: Alberto Castellani

27 April 2003 30	Reggina	0–0	Parma	Reggio Calabria
15:00 CEST		Report		Stadium: Stadio Oreste Granillo; Attendance: 23,528; Referee: Salvatore Racalbuto

3 May 2003 31	Parma	1–2	Bologna	Parma
15:00 CEST	Mutu 65'	Report	Paramatti 60'; Locatelli 67'	Stadium: Stadio Ennio Tardini; Attendance: 15,485; Referee: Emilio Pellegrino

10 May 2003 32	Internazionale	1–1	Parma	Milan
15:00 CEST	Kallon 36'	Report	Mutu 63'	Stadium: San Siro; Attendance: 56,399; Referee: Nicola Ayroldi

17 May 2003 33	Parma	3–2	Piacenza	Parma
15:00 CEST	Gilardino 67'; Adriano 70'; Mutu 89'	Report	Maresca 33'; Hübner 40'	Stadium: Stadio Ennio Tardini; Attendance: 14,267; Referee: Stefano Cassarà

24 May 2003 34	Empoli	0–2	Parma	Empoli
15:00 CEST		Report	Mutu 16'; Filippini 86'	Stadium: Stadio Carlo Castellani; Attendance: 5,847; Referee: Pasquale Rodomonti

=== Coppa Italia ===
==== Second round ====
25 September 2002 First leg	Vicenza	2–0	Parma	Vicenza
	Veronese 11'; Jeda 67' (pen.)			Stadium: Stadio Romeo Menti; Referee: Stefano Farina

23 October 2002 Second leg	Parma	2–1 (a.e.t.) (2–3 agg.)	Vicenza	Parma
	Bonazzoli 24'; Gilardino 63'		Cristallini 98'	Stadium: Stadio Ennio Tardini; Referee: Paolo Dondarini

=== UEFA Cup ===
==== First round ====
19 September 2002 First leg	CSKA Moscow (Russia)	1–1	(Italy) Parma	Ramenskoye, Russia
18:30 CEST (UTC+02:00)	Gusev (yellow card) 54'; Popov 67'	Report	Filippini (yellow card) 43'; Bonera (yellow card) 45'; Mutu 53'	Stadium: Saturn Stadium; Referee: Georgios Kasnaferis (Greece)

3 October 2002 Second leg	Parma (Italy)	3–2 (4–3 agg.)	(Russia) CSKA Moscow	Parma, Italy
21:00 CEST (UTC+02:00)	Adriano 8'; Ferrari (yellow card) 24'; Filippini (yellow card) 52'; Mutu 66', 90'	Report	Yanovskiy (yellow card) 23'; Rahimić (yellow card) 25'; Semak 37', 43'; Solomatin (yellow card) 46'; A. Berezutski (yellow card) 53'; Nigmatullin (yellow card) 88'	Stadium: Stadio Ennio Tardini; Referee: Uriah Rennie (England)

==== Second round ====
31 October 2002 First leg	Parma (Italy)	2–1	(Poland) Wisła Kraków	Parma, Italy
21:00 CET (UTC+01:00)	Donati 26'; Diana (yellow card) 60'; Mutu 74'; Barone (yellow card) 84'	Report	Żurawski 46'; Stolarczyk (yellow card) 49'; Baszczyński (yellow card) 78'	Stadium: Stadio Ennio Tardini; Referee: Alon Yefet (Israel)

13 November 2002 Second leg	Wisła Kraków (Poland)	4–1 (a.e.t.) (5–3 agg.)	(Italy) Parma	Kraków, Poland
20:45 CET (UTC+01:00)	Kosowski 70'; Żurawski 80', 94'; Dubicki 107'	Report	Adriano 6'; Benarrivo (yellow card) 35'; Lamouchi (yellow card) 70'	Stadium: Stadion Miejski im. Henryka Reymana; Referee: Dejan Delević (Serbia)

== Statistics ==
=== Players statistics ===
No.	Pos	Nat	Player	Total		Serie A		Coppa		UEFA Cup	
No.	Pos	Nat	Player	Apps	Goals	Apps	Goals	Apps	Goals	Apps	Goals
1	GK	(France) FRA	Frey	38	-44	34	-36	0	0	4	-8
27	DF	(Italy) ITA	Benarrivo	23	0	16+3	0	0	0	4	0
5	DF	(Italy) ITA	Bonera	37	1	32	1	1	0	4	0
21	DF	(Italy) ITA	Ferrari	36	2	32	2	0	0	4	0
16	DF	(Brazil) BRA	Júnior	30	0	27	0	1	0	2	0
10	MF	(Japan) JPN	Nakata	36	4	29+2	4	1	0	4	0
6	MF	(Italy) ITA	Barone	33	1	26+3	1	2	0	2	0
8	MF	(France) FRA	Lamouchi	35	2	28+2	2	1	0	4	0
17	MF	(Italy) ITA	Filippini	34	2	29+1	2	1	0	3	0
20	FW	(Romania) ROU	Mutu	36	22	31	18	1	0	4	4
9	FW	(Brazil) BRA	Adriano	31	17	28	15	1	0	2	2
22	GK	(Brazil) BRA	Taffarel	2	-3	0	0	2	-3		
26	MF	(Italy) ITA	Brighi	25	1	13+9	1	3	0		
3	DF	(Italy) ITA	Cardone	13	1	13	1				
28	DF	(Italy) ITA	Cannavaro	16	0	9+5	0	2	0		
23	MF	(Australia) AUS	Bresciano	27	0	7+17	0	2	0	1	0
11	FW	(Italy) ITA	Bonazzoli	14	4	6+2	3	2	1	4	0
18	FW	(Italy) ITA	Gilardino	28	5	4+20	4	2	1	2	0
29	MF	(Italy) ITA	Donati	12	2	4+3	1	2	0	3	1
4	DF	(Slovakia) SVK	Greško	8	0	3+2	0	2	0	1	0
2	DF	(Italy) ITA	Diana	8	0	2+3	0	2	0	1	0
7	MF	(Italy) ITA	Marchionni	8	0	1+4	0	2	0	1	0
15	MF	(Italy) ITA	Rosina	6	0	1+5	0				
24	DF	(Italy) ITA	Siviglia	4	0	1+1	0	1	0	1	0
29	DF	(Italy) ITA	Pierini	4	0	0+4	0				
4	FW	(Italy) ITA	Porcari	1	0	0+1	0				
11	MF	(Colombia) COL	Montaño	1	0	0+1	0				
	FW	(Italy) ITA	Di Vaio	0	0	0	0	0	0	0	0
	DF	(Italy) ITA	Falsini	0	0	0	0	0	0	0	0
12	DF	(Argentina) ARG	Oyola	0	0	0	0				
25	GK	(Italy) ITA	De Lucia	0	0	0	0				
19	FW	(Italy) ITA	Massaro	0	0	0	0				
7	MF	(Italy) ITA	Ruffini	0	0	0	0				

- Source: http://calcio-seriea.net/allenatori_squadra/2002/1226/
