= Matteo Bogani =

Italian footballer (born 1982)

Personal information
- Date of birth: 2 May 1982 (age 44)
- Place of birth: Como, Italy
- Height: 1.82 m (6 ft 0 in)
- Position: Attacking midfielder

Youth career
- 1994–2001: Internazionale

Senior career*
Years	Team	Apps	(Gls)
2001–2002	Fidelis Andria	10	(0)
2002	Legnano	4	(0)
2003	Sassuolo	2	(0)
2003–2005	Tolentino	50	(1)
Total		70	(1)
- * Club domestic league appearances and goals

Matteo Bogani (born 2 May 1982) is a Italian former footballer who plays as a attacking midfielder.

== Career ==
Born in Como, Lombardy, 45 km north of Milan, Bogani started his career at F.C. Internazionale Milano. He played with the Primavera U20 youth team during the 2000–01 season, and in September 2001, he was loaned to Fidelis Andria along with teammate Roberto Capetti. Co-currently, he was sold to A.C. Milan in exchange with Paolo Ginestra, which created a "profit" of €3.5million, but the sell of Bogani's profit was in terms of Ginestra's registration rights. Milan and Inter had done the deals to gain false profit in 1999 to 2001, and 2003 (include Bogani's youth team teammate Marco Varaldi, Giuseppe Ticli, Salvatore Ferraro and Alessandro Livi). The two clubs finally fined in 2008. and 5 other clubs were also fined.

After spending a season at Andria, he moved to Sassuolo on loan along with Ginestra. In January 2003, he returned to AC Milan and joined Legnano.

Since the 2003–04 and 2004–05 seasons, he played for Tolentino, where he played 50 league matches in the last seasons.
