= Alberto Schettino =

Italian footballer (born 1984)

Personal information
- Date of birth: 26 March 1984 (age 42)
- Place of birth: Castellammare di Stabia, Italy
- Height: 1.82 m (5 ft 11 1/2 in)
- Position: Left back

Team information
- Current team: Fondi

Youth career
- ?–2002: Torino
- 2002–2004: Roma
- 2002–2003: → Torino (loan)

Senior career*
Years	Team	Apps	(Gls)
2004–2007	Teramo	13	(1)
2005	→ Rosetana (loan)	4	(0)
2006	→ Latina (loan)	6	(0)
2007–2008	Cuneo	28	(1)
2008–2010	Alessandria	47	(1)
2010–2011	Pro Vercelli	16	(0)
2012–	Fondi	16	(0)
- * Club domestic league appearances and goals as of 4 June 2012

Alberto Schettino (born 26 March 1984) is an Italian footballer who plays for Fondi. Schettino spent his whole career in Lega Pro (ex-Serie C).

== Biography ==
=== Torino ===
Born in Castellammare di Stabia, the Province of Naples, Schettino started his career at Torino Calcio in the northern city of Turin. He was part of Allievi Nazionali team in 2000-01 season.

=== Roma and false accounting scandal ===
In June 2002 signed by Roma in co-ownership deal, which Torino also got Daniele Martinetti in co-ownership in exchange. He signed a 3-year contract. Both players were tagged for €1.6M. Both club was also swapped Luigi Panarelli and Gabriele Paoletti for Giammarco Frezza and Alberto Maria Fontana. Both club enjoy a false capital gains on footballers, which only in terms of intangible asset increased.

He was remained at Torino youth team until June 2004, which Roma gave up their remain 50% rights of Martinetti, Frezza and Fontana for free; Torino sold the remain rights of Panarelli, Paoletti and Schettino for just €60,000 in total. The club also corrected the asset table of the club by setting up a special 10-year amortize fund in 2002–03 season, which Schettino's contract value had write-down (more correctly moved to the special fund) €3.08 million, and would amortize in 10-year period. The rest of €120,000 had been amortized ca 2002–03 season, made Schettino worth for nothing in main accounting table of the players. Eventually the special fund was removed on 1 July 2006, the date that Roma adopted IFRS accounting standards, which the over €80 million toxic (paper) asset of the special fund was vaporized.

=== Post-Roma ===
He then left for Teramo in another co-ownership deal along with Denis Boshnjaku, for a peppercorn of €500 each. Roma also registered a profit of €1,000 each for the players, as they were already write-down to zero previously. Panarelli also joined the team for free. In June 2005, Roma gave up its remain 50% rights, which the club had to register a financial loss of €500, as the asset value of the retain 50% rights of Schettino had "worth" €500 in accounting to worth nothing. Schettino was loaned to Rosetana in January 2005 to seek the chance to play. After no appearance in the first half of 2005-06 season, he was loaned to Latina in January 2006. He played 11 Serie C1 matches in 2006–07 season.

In summer 2007, Schettino returned to Piedmont for Serie C2 side Cuneo, where he started to play as a regular starter.

In August 2008, he remained at Piedmont, signed an annual contract with Lega Pro Prima Divisione side Alessandria. He was offered another year in July 2009. Schettino left Alessandria on 30 June 2010 and was five months without an club, before signed on 20 November 2010 for Pro Vercelli.

After without a club for nearly 6 months, Schettino was signed by Fondi in December 2011.
