= Achille Coser =

Italian footballer (born 1982)

Personal information
- Date of birth: 14 July 1982 (age 44)
- Place of birth: Gazzaniga, Italy
- Height: 1.85 m (6 ft 1 in)
- Position: Goalkeeper

Youth career
- AlbinoLeffe

Senior career*
Years	Team	Apps	(Gls)
2001–2009	AlbinoLeffe	60	(0)
2001–2002	→ Bergamasca (loan)	13	(0)
2003–2004	→ Biellese (loan)	32	(0)
2007	→ Pergocrema (loan)	13	(0)
2010	Pro Belvedere Vercelli	12	(0)
2010–2011	Ascoli	1	(0)
2011–2012	Novara	2	(0)
2012–2014	Vicenza	3	(0)
2013–2014	→ Cesena (loan)	25	(0)
2014–2015	Livorno	0	(0)
2015	Virtus Entella	0	(0)
2015–2016	Südtirol	15	(0)
2016–2019	AlbinoLeffe	66	(0)
- * Club domestic league appearances and goals as of 5 May 2019

Achille Coser (born 14 July 1982) is an Italian football goalkeeper.

== Career ==
=== AlbinoLeffe ===
Coser was signed by AlbinoLeffe in 1999. He worked as Paolo Acerbis' backup except 2005–06 season which Acerbis left the club on loan in exchange with Paolo Ginestra.

In summer 2006 the club signed Federico Marchetti, which saw Coser became 3rd goalkeeper. In January 2007 he was signed by Pergocrema in temporary deal.

In January 2008, Acerbis left for Triestina and Coser became Marchetti's backup. Coser made 11 appearances in 2007–08 Serie B (all in the second half of season), as the holder of no.1 shirt.

In summer 2008, Marchetti left for Cagliari, and Coser became new signing Antonio Narciso's backup. He was released for free in June 2009.

=== Pro Belvedere Vercelli ===
He signed for Lega Pro Seconda Divisione outfit Pro Belvedere in January 2010.

=== Ascoli ===
In 2010, he was signed by Ascoli on a two-year contract.

=== Novara ===
In 2011, he was signed by Novara along with Simone Pesce, for free and €150,000 respectively. On the next day Novara also signed Luigi Giorgi for €1.6 million.

=== Vicenza ===
In 2012, he was signed by Vicenza on a three-year contract, with Alessandro Bastrini moved to opposite direction. The club also signed Alex Pinardi from Novara, and sent Alain Baclet to Novara. All 4 players were valued for €1 million accounting value, thus no cash were involved in the swap deals. The club relegated at the end of season.

=== Cesena ===
In 2013, he returned to Serie B for Cesena, with Nicola Ravaglia moved to Veneto. At Cesena, Coser was ahead Andrea Rossini, Andrea Campagnolo and Federico Agliardi as first choice for most of the season. In the promotion playoffs both Agliardi and Coser had played.

=== Livorno ===
On 13 August 2014 he was signed by Livorno on free transfer.

=== AlbinoLeffe ===
Coser joined AlbinoLeffe on 12 August 2016.
