= Davide Sinigaglia =

Italian footballer (born 1981)

Personal information
- Date of birth: 29 July 1981 (age 45)
- Place of birth: Tradate, Italy
- Height: 1.77 m (5 ft 10 in)
- Position: Forward

Team information
- Current team: ASD Cellatica

Youth career
- 1997–2000: Internazionale

Senior career*
Years	Team	Apps	(Gls)
1999–2001	Internazionale	1	(0)
2000–2001	→ Meda (loan)	31	(11)
2001–2004	Ternana	0	(0)
2001–2002	→ Padova (loan)	20	(3)
2002–2003	→ Monza (loan)	29	(13)
2003–2004	→ Lumezzane (loan)	33	(15)
2004–2007	Arezzo	22	(0)
2005	→ Atalanta (loan)	12	(1)
2005–2006	→ Genoa (loan)	15	(3)
2006–2007	→ Padova (loan)	31	(6)
2007–2009	Novara	54	(8)
2009–2011	Cesena	7	(1)
2010	→ Lanciano (loan)	9	(1)
2011–2013	Ternana	58	(12)
2013–2014	Monza	27	(12)
2014–2015	Reggiana	21	(2)
2015	→ Giana Erminio (loan)	14	(3)
2015–2016	Pistoiese	29	(4)
2016	Grosseto	14	(1)
2017	Parma	2	(0)
2017–2018	ASD Nibbiano		
2018–2019	Darfo Boario	28	(7)
2019	AC Ardor Lazzate		
2019–2022	Atletico Castagneto		
2022–	ASD Cellatica		

International career
1996–1997	Italy U16	14	(1)
1997–1998	Italy U17	12	(4)
1999–2000	Italy U19	6	(2)
- * Club domestic league appearances and goals as of 6 July 2017 (UTC)

Davide Sinigaglia (born 29 July 1981) is an Italian footballer who plays as a forward for ASD Cellatica.

Sinigaglia had made over 200 games in Lega Pro but only a handful of games in Serie A and Serie B.

== Club career ==
Sinigaglia was a youth product of Internazionale. He played his first Serie A match on 7 February 1999, Inter 5–1 Empoli. He was a substitute for Nicola Ventola. Coach Mircea Lucescu never used Sinigaglia again due to his young age.

=== Ternana ===
Sinigaglia was jointly contracted with Ternana and Inter from the 2001–02 season until June 2003; Ternana bought Sinigaglia and Cristian Lizzori outright from Inter for a peppercorn of €500 each in June 2003. (Note: The actual revenue was turned to co-ownership debt and the co-ownership loss of €515,457 was turned to deferred amortization (Articolo 18-bis Legge 91/1981)) Ternana bought half of Sinigaglia and Lizzori for a total of 1 billion lire (€516,457) in July 2001 and June 2002 respectively.

Sinigaglia was loaned to Serie C1 and Serie C2 teams during his whole contract with Ternana, namely Veneto club Padova and Lombard club Monza. Sinigaglia was then joint contracted by Ternana and Lumezzane. Sinigaglia scored his career high of 15 goals for the Lombard club in 2003–04 Serie C1. In June 2004 the joint-contract was renewed. On 31 August 2004 he was signed by Arezzo outright, from both Lumezzane and Ternana.

=== Arezzo ===
He played his first ever Serie B season for Arezzo in 11 games, before moving on loan to Atalanta of Serie A in January 2005 as a player to avoid falling back to the second division. He was then loaned by Genoa in 2005, to help the club to win promotion back to Serie B. He was called back in January 2006, for a chance to get the ticket to the promotion playoff to Serie A for Arezzo, but failed.

In summer 2006, he was moved to Padova of Serie C1, and one year later for another in the same level, Novara on 11 July 2007.

=== Novara ===
Sinigaglia made 56 appearances in the third tier for Novara. Both seasons the club failed to win major trophy nor promotion to the second division.

=== Cesena ===
In 2009, he was swapped with Simone Motta of Cesena, the newcomer of Serie B. Sinigaglia was valued €500,000 and Motta for €720,000 (thus only €220,000 cash was involved). Sinigaglia signed a 2-year contract. In his third Serie B season, he only scored once in 7 games. In January 2010 Sinigaglia was loaned to Lanciano of the third tier. Lanciano finished as the ninth of group B. In the same month Cesena promoted to Serie A as the runner-up. Sinigaglia did not have any chance in 2010–11 Serie A, his fourth Serie A season.

=== Ternana ===
In January 2011 he was transferred to Ternana for free. After winning promotion to Serie B, the contract was extended along with forward Raffaele Nolè.

=== Monza ===
On 2 September 2013 Sinigaglia was signed by Monza. In August 2013 Sinigaglia also acquired the license to become a youth team coach.

=== Reggiana ===
On 2 August 2014 Sinigaglia was signed by Reggiana in a 2-year contract. On 2 February 2015 he was signed by Giana Erminio in a temporary deal.

=== Pistoiese ===
Sinigaglia was signed by Pistoiese on 31 August 2015, in a definitive deal from Reggiana.

=== Grosseto & Parma ===
On 9 September 2016 Sinigaglia was signed by Serie D club Grosseto. On 5 February 2017 Sinigaglia was signed by Parma on a free transfer.

=== AC Ardor Lazzate ===
Ahead of the 2019/20 season, Sinigaglia joined AC Ardor Lazzate.

=== Atletico Castagneto ===
In December 2019, Sinigaglia moved to Promozione Lombardia club ASD Atletico Castagneto.

== International career ==
Sinigaglia was a member of Italy under-18 team in 2000 UEFA European Under-18 Championship Intermediary round. (now renamed to under-19 with same age limit, U18 at the start of season or U19 at the end of season) Sinigaglia also played in 1997 UEFA European Under-16 Championship (now renamed to under-17 with same age limit) . Italy used a mixed 1980 and 1981 born players for the tournament. Sinigaglia finished as the runner-up at 1998 UEFA European Under-16 Championship.
