= List of Italian football transfers summer 2001 (co-ownership) =

This is a list of Italian football transfers for co-ownership resolutions, for the 2001-02 season, from and to Serie A and Serie B.

According to Article 102 bis of NOIF (Norme Organizzative Interne della FIGC), the co-ownership deal must be confirmed each year. The deal may expire, be renewed, be bought back or be sold outright. Deals that fail to form an agreement after the deadline will be defined by auction between the two clubs. The club will submit their bid in a sealed envelope. Non-submission may lead to the rights is free to give to the opposite side. The mother club may sell their rights to third parties.

== Co-ownership ==
| Date | Name | Co-owning club | Mother club | Result | Fee |
|---|---|---|---|---|---|
| 28 June 2001 | Salvatore Accursi | Cagliari | Messina | Renewed | – |
| 28 June 2001 | Adaílton (Brazil) | Verona | Parma | Renewed | – |
| 28 June 2001 | Alessandro Agostini | Ternana | Fiorentina | Fiorentina | Undisclosed |
| 30 June 2001 | Luca Altomare | Cosenza | Napoli | Napoli | Auction, undisclosed |
| 14 June 2001 | Marco Ambrosio | Lucchese | Sampdoria | Lucchese | Undisclosed |
| 28 June 2001 | Nicola Amoruso | Napoli | Juventus | Juventus | Undisclosed |
| 27 June 2001 | Luca Anania | Pro Sesto | Internazionale | Renewed | – |
| 28 June 2001 | Davide Andorno | Pro Vercelli | Juventus | Renewed | – |
| 28 June 2001 | Salvatore Aronica | Crotone | Juventus | Renewed | – |
| 28 June 2001 | Dario Baccin | Napoli | Juventus | Renewed | – |
| 2001-06-28 | Marco Caneira | Reggina | Internazionale | Internazionale | Undisclosed |
| 2001-06-27 | Paolo Castelli | Cagliari | Internazionale | Renewed | |
| 2001-06-28 | Giacomo Cipriani | Juventus | Bologna | Renewed | |
| 2001-06-27 | Bernardo Corradi | Internazionale | Chievo | Renewed | |
| | Nicola Corrent | | | | |
| 2001-06-28 | Paulo Costa | Reggina | Internazionale | Reggina | Undisclosed |
| 2001-06-27 | Marco D'Adda | Pro Sesto | Internazionale | Pro Sesto | Undisclosed |
| 2001-06-27 | Vasco Faísca | Vicenza | Internazionale | Renewed | |
| 2001-06-27 | Riccardo Fissore | Torino | Internazionale | Torino | Undisclosed |
| 2001-06-26 | Alessandro Gamberini | Juventus | Bologna | Renewed | |
| 28 June 2001 | Luigi Giandomenico | Venezia | Juventus | ND (Venezia) | Free |
| 27 June 2001 | Mattia Graffiedi | Milan | Cesena | Renewed | – |
| 2001-06-28 | Mohamed Kallon (Sierra Leone) | Vicenza | Internazionale | Internazionale | L 8,500 million |
| 2001-06-27 | Cristian Lizzori | Arezzo | Internazionale | Internazionale | Undisclosed |
| 2001-06-28 | Simone Malatesta | Juventus | Modena | Renewed | |
| 2001-06-28 | Luca Moreo | Andria | Juventus | ND (Andria) | Free |
| 2006-06-30 | Adrian Mutu (Romania) | Verona | Internazionale | Verona | Auction, undisclosed |
| 2001-06-28 | Rudy Nicoletto | Torres | Juventus | Renewed | |
| 2001-06-27 | Giovanni Passiglia | Arezzo | Internazionale | Renewed | |
| 2001-06-28 | Fabio Pecchia | Torino | Juventus | ND (Torino) | Free |
| 2001-06-26 | Alex Pederzoli | Juventus | Bologna | Renewed | |
| 14 June 2001 | Matteo Pelatti | Prato | Milan | Prato | Undisclosed |
| 2001-06-26 | Luca Pellegrini | Como | Juventus | Juventus | |
| 2001-06-30 | Simone Perrotta | Bari | Juventus | Bari | Auction, €0.3M |
| 2001-06-28 | Pierre Giorgio Regonesi | Juventus | Atalanta | Juventus | €25,000 |
| 2001-06-27 | Franco Semioli | Internazionale | Torino | Renewed | |
| 2001-06-28 | Manuel Sinato | Como | Juventus | Renewed | |
| 2001-06-28 | Jess Vanstrattan | Verona | Juventus | Renewed | |
| 2001-06-28 | Marco Zamboni | Udinese | Juventus | Renewed | |
| 2001-06-28 | Cristiano Zanetti | Roma | Internazionale | Internazionale | €5,164,569 |
| 2001-06-28 | Jonathan Zebina | Roma | Cagliari | Renewed | |
