= Nello Russo =

Italian footballer

Personal information
- Date of birth: 11 May 1981 (age 45)
- Place of birth: Vimodrone, Italy
- Height: 1.85 m (6 ft 1 in)
- Position: Forward

Youth career
- Internazionale

Senior career*
Years	Team	Apps	(Gls)
1999–2002	Internazionale	1	(1)
2000–2001	→ Arezzo (loan)	12	(1)
2001	→ Lecco (loan)	12	(1)
2001–2002	→ Viterbese (loan)	14	(0)
2002–2005	Lumezzane	72	(19)
2005	→ Crotone (loan)	15	(4)
2005–2009	Crotone	57	(9)
2006	→ AlbinoLeffe (loan)	19	(2)
2006–2007	→ Spezia (loan)	12	(0)
2007	→ Pescara (loan)	16	(1)
2008	→ Padova (loan)	6	(1)
2009–2011	Monza	25	(1)
2012	Isola Liri	12	(3)

International career
1996	Italy U15	2	(0)

Managerial career
- 2020-2021: Pro Sesto (Youth)
- 2021-2022: Internazionale (Youth)
- * Club domestic league appearances and goals

Nello Russo (born 11 May 1981) is a former Italian footballer who played as a forward.

== Football career ==
In 2000, he left on loan to Arezzo along with Giuseppe Ticli, Giovanni Passiglia and Cristian Lizzori, from Internazionale.

Russo was sold to Lumezzane in a co-ownership deal during the summer of 2003, after a successful loan. He was loaned to Crotone in the second half of the 2004/05 season, and Crotone chose to buy him from Lumezzane for €300,000. However, since his purchase, he has been loaned out to AlbinoLeffe, Spezia, Pescara and Padova in January 2008.

In summer 2007, Crotone got full ownership of the player for free. In August 2009 he left for Monza.

== Honours ==
Crotone

- Lega Pro Prima Divisione Promotion Playoffs Winner: 2009
