= Mirko Stefani =

Italian footballer

Personal information
- Date of birth: 25 January 1984 (age 42)
- Place of birth: Borgo Valsugana, Italy
- Height: 1.80 m (5 ft 11 in)
- Position: Centre back

Youth career
- Milan

Senior career*
Years	Team	Apps	(Gls)
2002–2003	Milan	1	(0)
2003–2005	Parma	2	(0)
2003–2004	→ Prato (loan)	7	(0)
2004–2005	→ Bellaria Igea Marina (loan)	35	(0)
2005–2011	Reggiana	153	(23)
2010–2011	→ Cremonese (loan)	31	(2)
2011–2012	Frosinone	28	(0)
2013–2014	Real Vicenza	20	(0)
2014–2015	Messina	32	(3)
2015–2022	Pordenone	142	(2)
Total		451	(30)

International career
2001	Italy U17	4	(1)
2002	Italy U18	3	(0)
2002–2003	Italy U19	7	(0)
2003–2005	Italy U20	6	(0)

Managerial career
- 2022–2023: Pordenone U17
- 2023: Pordenone
- 2023–2024: Udinese U17
- 2024–: Pordenone (academy manager)
- * Club domestic league appearances and goals

Mirko Stefani (born 25 January 1984) is an Italian football coach and former professional footballer who plays as a centre back. He is currently as a academy manager for Pordenone.

== Playing career ==
=== Early career ===
Born in Borgo Valsugana, Trentino, Stefani started his professional career with AC Milan of Lombardy, at first as a midfielder. He played his first and only match for AC Milan first team on 24 May 2003, the last Serie A match of the season and the match before 2003 UEFA Champions League Final and 2003 Coppa Italia Final. He was substituted at halftime with Mattia Dal Bello, Milan already losing 1–3 at that time.

In summer 2003, he was included in a 6-men swap deal with Parma—Stefani along with Marco Donadel and Davide Favaro, exchanged with Luca Ferretti, Roberto Massaro and Filippo Porcari.

He was immediately loaned to Prato of Serie C1. Although Stefani returned to Parma in January 2004, he did not play any match. In June 2004 Parma bought Favaro and Stefani outright; Milan bought back Donadel, bought Ferretti and Porcari outright; Massaro deal was renewed.

Stefani left for Bellaria Igea Marina of Serie C2 in 2004–05 season, where he played as a regular starter.

=== Reggiana ===
Reggiana signed him in a co-ownership deal in 2005. Stefani played 3 out of 4 promotion playoffs in summer 2007. Although Reggiana failed to win, the club bought all remain registration rights from Parma, along with Marco Fanna.

In 2010, he left for Cremonese in temporary deal.

=== Frosinone ===
On 18 August 2011 Stefani left for Frosinone Calcio in 3-year deal.

=== Italian football scandal ===
On 18 June 2012 he was banned 4 years for involvement in 2011–12 Italian football scandal. In April 2013 the ban was reduced to 13 months after the appeal was partially accepted by the Tribunale Nazionale di Arbitrato per lo Sport (TNAS) of CONI.

=== Real Vicenza ===
In summer 2013 he was signed by Real Vicenza V.S.

=== Messina ===
In summer 2014 he was signed by A.C.R. Messina.

=== Pordenone ===
On 24 July 2015 he was signed by Pordenone.

== International career ==
At international level he was capped for the Italy national under-16 team at the 2001 UEFA European Under-16 Championship and for the Italy under-19 team at the 2003 UEFA European Under-19 Championship.

== Coaching career ==
On 6 March 2023, after having served as youth coach in charge of Pordenone Under-17, Stefani was appointed new head coach of the first team in the Serie C league. He was dismissed as head coach on 11 April 2023 after 6 league games in charge (2 wins, 2 draws and 2 losses).

== Honours ==
Reggiana

- Serie C2: 2008
