= Davide Favaro =

Italian footballer (born 1984)

Personal information
- Date of birth: 7 May 1984 (age 42)
- Place of birth: Mirano, Italy
- Height: 1.78 m (5 ft 10 in)
- Positions: Attacking midfielder; striker

Youth career
- 1998–2003: Milan
- 2003–2004: Parma

Senior career*
Years	Team	Apps	(Gls)
2004–2005	Sambenedettese	14	(1)
2005–2006	Prato	26	(2)
2006–2007	Pro Sesto	5	(0)
2007–2008	Giulianova	12	(0)
2008	Valenzana	8	(0)
2008–2009	Chieti	20	(0)
2009–2010	Treviso	30	(18)
2010–2011	US Feltreseprealpi Calcio	26	(11)
2011–2012	FC Dolo 1909	28	(18)
2017–2019	Calcio Istrana 1964		
Total		181	(56)

International career
2001–2002	Italy U17	6	(0)
- * Club domestic league appearances and goals

Davide Favaro (born 7 May 1984) is a Italian former footballer who plays as a midfielder.

== Youth career ==
Born in Mirano, Veneto, Favaro started his youth career at AC Milan of Lombardy, where he played for five years from the 1998/99 to the 2002/2003 season.

In his five years at AC Milan, Favaro scored 59 goals. Unfortunately, in March 2003 he had a ligament rupture that didn't allow him to play until January 2004.

In 2003, AC Milan swapped youth players with Internazionale and Parma. That season, Favaro (€1M), Marco Donadel (€2M), and Mirko Stefani (€1M) of Milan were swapped for Roberto Massaro (€2M), Filippo Porcari (€1M) and Luca Ferretti (€1M). All deals were co-ownership deals and Favaro signed a 5-year contract. Favaro played a season at Primavera Team, where he was again trained by his former coach Davide Ballardini as well as scoring 6 goals in 12 matches.

In June 2004, Parma bought the remaining rights to Favaro and Stefani, while Donadel was bought back by Milan and received in return the remaining rights for Porcari and Ferretti.

Favaro played for the Italy National Team at 2001 UEFA European Under-16 Football Championship qualifiers.

== Professional career ==
Since the 2004 season, Favaro was loaned to clubs in Serie C1 and Serie C2.

In his first season, he played at Sambenedettese where he was trained for the third time by Ballardini, and the club reached third place in rank.

In the 2007–08 season, Favaro left for Giulianova and in mid-season swapped club with Fabio Mazzeo of Valenzana.

In 2008–09 season, Favaro played for Chieti of Serie D, the 5th level and top of regional league and non-professional football.

In 2009–10 season, Favaro joined newly re-found Treviso of Eccellenza Veneto whose predecessor entered bankruptcy and finished bottom of Serie B. Favaro scored 18 goals during that season, even though he played midfielder.

The following season Favaro played at Feltre, where he scored 11 goals. Favaro then played at Dolo, where he scored 18 goals.

== Personal career ==
Favaro graduated with a Bachelor of Art in Business Administration at University of Padua in October 2013.

In December 2015, he again graduated with a Master of Science in Sports Administration from St. Thomas University in Miami, FL.

In May 2018, Favaro also obtained an MBA in Sport Management at St. Thomas University in Miami, FL.
