= Luca Ferretti =

Italian footballer

Personal information
- Full name: Luca Ferretti
- Date of birth: 6 March 1983 (age 43)
- Place of birth: Montecchio Emilia, Italy
- Height: 1.77 m (5 ft 10 in)
- Position: Forward

Youth career
- ?–2003: Parma

Senior career*
Years	Team	Apps	(Gls)
2003–2008	AC Milan	0	(0)
2003–2004	→ Reggiana (loan)	2	(0)
2004	→ Legnano (loan)	5	(0)
2004–2005	→ Aglianese (loan)	32	(3)
2005–2006	→ San Marino Calcio (loan)	3	(0)
2008–2009	Lecco	5	(0)
Total		47	(3)
- * Club domestic league appearances and goals

Luca Ferretti (born 6 March 1983) is an Italian former footballer who played as a forward.

== Career ==
=== Early career ===
Born in Montecchio Emilia, Emilia-Romagna, Ferretti started his career at Parma, located at Parma, Emilia-Romagna.

In June 2003, Milan swapped their youth products with Parma, which Davide Favaro, Marco Donadel and Mirko Stefani left for Parma and Milan got Ferretti, Roberto Massaro and Filippo Porcari, all in a co-ownership deal. The deals were fined in 2009 because the clubs inflated the price of players to gain a false profit show in balance sheet.

=== Lega Pro ===
Ferretti was immediately loaned to Serie C1 for Reggiana but in mid-season left for Legnano of Serie C2. At the end of season, Parma got all registration rights from Milan.

In the next season, he left for Aglianese where he played 32 league matches.

In 2005, he was signed by San Marino Calcio. But after played 3 league matches, he quit professional football.

In August 2008, he signed a 1-year contract with Lecco.
