= Cristian Lizzori =

Italian footballer (born 1980)

Personal information
- Full name: Cristian Lizzori
- Date of birth: 2 April 1980 (age 46)
- Place of birth: Codogno, Italy
- Height: 1.84 m (6 ft 0 in)
- Position: Central defender

Youth career
- Internazionale

Senior career*
Years	Team	Apps	(Gls)
2000–2000	Internazionale	0	(0)
2000–2001	Arezzo	34	(0)
2001–2003	Ternana	9	(0)
2003	→ Viterbese (loan)	12	(0)
2003–2007	Spezia	33	(0)
2005	→ Sora (loan)	9	(0)
2005–2006	→ Vittoria (loan)	24	(0)
2007	→ Pro Vercelli (loan)	10	(1)
2007–2008	Sassari Torres Atletico Miradolo	27	(0)
Total		158	(1)
- * Club domestic league appearances and goals

Cristian Lizzori (born 2 April 1980) is an Italian former footballer who played as a defender.

== Career ==
Born in Codogno, Lombardy region, Lizzori started his career at Lombard and Serie A club Internazionale. In 2000, he graduated from Primavera Under-20 team and joined Arezzo along with Giovanni Passiglia, Nello Russo and Giuseppe Ticli. He made his Serie B debut on 2 September 2002, the round 2 match against Messina as starter. The match ended in 1-1 draw. In June 2001, he was bought back by Inter and loaned to Ternana. Ternana then signed Lizzori in co-ownership deal for 500 million lire (€258,228) in June 2002 and then loaned to Viterbese. In June 2003, Ternana bought Lizzori and Davide Sinigaglia outright from Inter for €500 each (Note: The actual revenue was turned to co-ownership debt and the co-ownership loss of €515,457 was turned to deferred amortization (Articolo 18-bis Legge 91/1981)) But he then joined Spezia in another co-ownership deal, which Spezia at that time partially owned by Inter. Inter team-mate Luca Ceccarelli and Nicola Napolitano also joined the club on loan. He left the club in January 2005 after signed defender Hernán Paolo Dellafiore from Inter.

He then spent 2005–06 season at Sicilian side Vittoria and in January 2007 left for Pro Vercelli.

In 2007-08 season Lizzori he left for Sardinian side Sassari Torres. After the club folded, Lizzori retired.

== Honours ==
Spezia

- Coppa Italia Serie C: 2004–05
