= Ciro Danucci =

Italian football manager (born 1983)

Personal information
- Date of birth: 28 June 1983 (age 43)
- Place of birth: Taranto, Italy
- Height: 1.82 m (6 ft 0 in)
- Position: Midfielder

Team information
- Current team: Ischia (head coach)

Youth career
- Taranto

Senior career*
| Years | Team | Apps | (Gls) |
| 2001–2003 | Manduria | 63 | (1) |
| 2003–2004 | Martina | 31 | (0) |
| 2004–2007 | Catania | 1 | (0) |
| 2005 | → Reggiana (loan) | 10 | (0) |
| 2005–2006 | → Sangiovannese (loan) | 29 | (2) |
| 2006–2007 | → Taranto (loan) | 12 | (0) |
| 2007 | Cesena | 3 | (0) |
| 2007–2010 | Ternana | 59 | (0) |
| 2009 | → Varese (loan) | 13 | (1) |
| 2010–2012 | Juve Stabia | 35 | (0) |
| 2012–2013 | Cuneo | 15 | (0) |
| 2013–2014 | Sorrento | 29 | (1) |
| 2014–2015 | Brindisi | 27 | (2) |
| 2015–2016 | Jolly Montemurlo | 30 | (3) |
| 2016–2017 | Turris | 21 | (2) |
| 2017–2019 | Campobasso | 65 | (1) |
| 2019–2020 | Nardò | 23 | (0) |

Managerial career
- 2020–2021: Nardò
- 2021–2022: Fasano
- 2022–2023: Brindisi
- 2024: Brindisi
- 2024: Fidelis Andria
- 2025: Taranto
- 2026: Taranto
- 2026–: Ischia
- * Club domestic league appearances and goals

Ciro Danucci (born 28 June 1983) is an Italian football manager and former player who is the head coach of Serie D Group G club Ischia.

== Biography ==
Born in Manduria, in the Province of Taranto, Apulia, Danucci started his senior career at Italian Serie D (Italian fifth level until 2014) club Manduria in 2001. In 2003 Danucci was signed by Martina of Serie C1.

=== Catania ===
In 2004, he was signed by Serie B club Catania. He made his second-division debut on 28 November 2004, his only Catania appearance. In January 2005, Danucci returned to the third division for Reggiana. He remained in that level in 2005–06 Serie C1 for Sangiovannese, as well as Taranto in the first half of 2006–07 Serie C1.

In January 2007 Serie B struggler Cesena signed Danucci, Anastasi and Del Core from Catania in co-ownership deals, for €30,000, €280,000 and €120,000 respectively. At the end of season Cesena finished as the 15th. In June 2007, Cesena bought Anastasi outright for €1,000, while Catania bought back Danucci and Del Core for €1,000 each.

=== Ternana ===
In July 2007, Danucci was sold to Serie C1 club Ternana in another co-ownership deal for €75,000. In June 2008 Catania gave up the remaining 50% registration rights for free. After 6 starts and 2 substitutes appearances in 2008–09 Lega Pro Prima Divisione (ex–Serie C1), Danucci left for Lega Pro Seconda Divisione (ex–Serie C2) club Varese on 2 February 2009. The club won the champion of Group A, as well as promotion and the runner-up in 2009 Supercoppa di Lega di Seconda Divisione.

Danucci returned to Terni in 2009–10 Lega Pro Prima Divisione. He made 26 starts for the club that season.

=== Juve Stabia ===
In 2010 Danucci left for S.S. Juve Stabia. The club won the promotion playoffs of 2010–11 Lega Pro Prima Divisione. Danucci had played all four matches in the playoffs.

Danucci made another nine starts in the second division in 2011–12 Serie B for Juve Stabia.

=== Cuneo & Sorrento ===
In October 2012 Danucci was signed by the third division club Cuneo. The club relegated to Lega Pro 2nd Division in 2013. On 3 August 2013 Danucci was signed by fellow fourth division club Sorrento. That season would be the last season of Lega Pro 2nd Division, as the two divisions of Lega Pro (ex–Serie C) would be merged, as well as reduction from 69 teams to 60 teams. On 5 August, the league committee also admitted six additional teams from Serie D to fill the vacancies. Sorrento finished as the 9th of Group B, 1 point below Vigor Lamezia. The hope of avoiding relegation was cut short by a 0–4 loss to Arzanese in the first match of the relegation playoffs. Eventually, Sorrento lost 3–4 in aggregate despite a 3–0 home win; Danucci played both matches as a starter.

== Coaching career ==
On 17 November 2021, he was hired as head coach of Fasano in Serie D.

On 10 June 2022, he was hired as head coach of Brindisi, winning promotion to Serie C in his first season in charge. He was dismissed on 28 November 2023 after a negative start in the club's 2023–24 Serie C campaign. On 20 February 2024, Danucci was called back in charge of Brindisi, taking over with the team dead last in the league, lasting only two weeks before mutually agreeing to leave the club for good on 4 March.

He successively served briefly as head coach of Serie D club Fidelis Andria from June to October 2024.

For the 2025–26 season, Danucci became head coach of Taranto, refounded in the Eccellenza Apulia after the collapse that had seen the club excluded from Serie C in 2024–25. He was dismissed on 24 November 2025 after a home draw with Novoli left the team five points behind the leaders, Bisceglie, and was replaced by Luigi Panarelli, but returned to the post on 4 January 2026. Taranto reached the Eccellenza play-offs but missed out on promotion to Serie D, and also lost the final of the Coppa Italia Puglia to Bisceglie. On 1 July 2026, Danucci announced on social media that he had been told by sporting director Danilo Pagni that there was no basis for continuing, and that he would not be in charge for the following season. In his farewell message he described having begun the campaign with a squad assembled in a matter of days and four or five days of preparation, and said he regretted never having coached Taranto in normal conditions or having had a say in recruitment during either of his spells at the club.

On 29 September 2026, Danucci was appointed head coach of Serie D club Ischia, replacing Vincenzo Platone, who had been dismissed the previous day after a 3–1 defeat at Bisceglie left the club bottom of Group H with one point from five matches.
