= Daniele Martinetti =

Italian footballer (born 1981)

Personal information
- Date of birth: 26 June 1981 (age 45)
- Place of birth: Rome, Italy
- Height: 1.83 m (6 ft 0 in)
- Position: Forward

Youth career
- 1998–2001: Roma

Senior career*
Years	Team	Apps	(Gls)
2001–2002	Roma	0	(0)
2002	→ Sora (loan)	8	(1)
2002–2004	Torino	0	(0)
2002–2003	→ Sora (loan)	13	(2)
2003–2004	→ Prato (loan)	12	(0)
2005	Novara	29	(12)
2006–2008	Arezzo	86	(32)
2009–2011	Sassuolo	75	(20)
2011–2013	Varese	48	(8)
- * Club domestic league appearances and goals

Daniele Martinetti (born 6 June 6, 1981) is an Italian former footballer.

Martinetti started his career at AS Roma youth rank. He was loaned to Sora in January 2002 for first team experience. In June 2002, he was exchanged with Alberto Schettino but Martinetti remained at Serie C1 side Sora until the end of 2002–03 season. In 2003–04 season he left for another Serie C1 club, Prato, but in different group.

In summer 2004, he returned to Torino, and award no.24 shirt. In January 2005 he left for Serie C1 again for Novara, without any appearance to II Toro. In January 2006, he was signed by Arezzo. In his first Serie B season, he open his sheet by scored 4 goals. But in second season, his 10 goals (along with Floro Flores 14) does not avoid relegation to Serie C1. Martinetti played in Serie C1 again until signed by Sassuolo in January 2009.
