= Giovanni Passiglia =

Italian footballer

Personal information
- Date of birth: 28 August 1981 (age 45)
- Place of birth: Castelvetrano, Italy
- Height: 1.78 m (5 ft 10 in)
- Position: Midfielder

Youth career
- Inter Milan

Senior career*
Years	Team	Apps	(Gls)
1997–1998	Spezia	1	(0)
1999–2000	Inter Milan	0	(0)
2000–2006	Arezzo	130	(3)
2003	→ Ancona (loan)	2	(0)
2006–2007	Pisa	37	(0)
2008–2010	Vicenza	10	(0)
2008–2009	→ Perugia (loan)	24	(0)
2009–2010	→ Pro Patria (loan)	18	(1)
2010–2011	Pisa	21	(1)
2012–2014	Poggibonsi	20	(0)
2014–2015	Lavagnese	13	(0)

International career
1997	Italy U15	2	(0)
2001	Italy U20	1	(0)
- * Club domestic league appearances and goals

Giovanni Passiglia (born 28 August 1981) is an Italian former footballer who played as a midfielder.

== Career ==
Passiglia started his career at Inter Milan. In 2000, he joined Arezzo, along with Giuseppe Ticli, Nello Russo and Cristian Lizzori.

Except on loan to Serie B team Ancona in 2nd half of 2002–03 season, he was played in Serie C1 until followed Arezzo promoted to Serie B in summer 2004.

In summer 20065, he joined Pisa of Serie C1, and won promotion to Serie B again.

In January 2008, after lack of chance to play, he signed for league rival Vicenza.

In August 2009, he was loaned to Pro Patria.
