= Pasquale D'Aniello =

Italian footballer

Personal information
- Date of birth: December 16, 1985 (age 40)
- Place of birth: Naples, Italy
- Height: 1.86 m (6 ft 1 in)
- Position: Defender

Team information
- Current team: Colligiana

Senior career*
Years	Team	Apps	(Gls)
2004–2006	Bologna	9	(0)
2005	→ Castelnuovo (loan)	18	(0)
2006	→ Spezia (loan)	12	(0)
2006–2007	Torres	24	(0)
2007–2008	San Marino Calcio	21	(0)
2008	Olbia	6	(0)
2009–2010	→ Alessandria (loan)	10	(0)
jan-jun 2010	Colligiana	0	(0)
2010–	F.C. Turris 1944 A.S.D.		
- * Club domestic league appearances and goals as of 23 April 2010

Pasquale D'Aniello (born 16 December 1985) is an Italian footballer who plays as a defender for F.C. Turris 1944 A.S.D.
