= Paolo Ginestra =

Italian footballer

Personal information
- Date of birth: 14 February 1979 (age 47)
- Place of birth: Pergola, Italy
- Height: 1.85 m (6 ft 1 in)
- Position: Goalkeeper

Team information
- Current team: Matelica

Youth career
- 1994–1996: Pergolese
- 1996–1997: Fano

Senior career*
Years	Team	Apps	(Gls)
1997–1998	Fano	14	(0)
1998–1999	Triestina	4	(0)
1999	Maceratese	14	(0)
1999–2000	Lecco	26	(0)
2000–2001	Milan	0	(0)
2000–2001	→ Castel di Sangro (loan)	4	(0)
2001–2004	Internazionale	0	(0)
2001–2002	→ Prato (loan)	3	(0)
2002–2003	→ Sassuolo (loan)	34	(0)
2003–2004	→ Vis Pesaro (loan)	18	(0)
2004–2005	Vis Pesaro	31	(0)
2005–2006	Livorno	0	(0)
2005–2006	→ AlbinoLeffe (loan)	18	(0)
2006–2010	Ternana	84	(0)
2009	→ Parma (loan)	0	(0)
2010–2011	Paganese	19	(0)
2011–2012	Foggia	24	(0)
2012–2013	Forlì	31	(0)
2013–2016	Fano	76	(0)
2016–2017	Casertana	37	(0)
2017–2019	Fermana	23	(0)
2019	Notaresco	13	(0)
2019–2022	Fermana	78	(0)
2022–	Matelica		
- * Club domestic league appearances and goals as of 23 April 2022

Paolo Ginestra (born 14 February 1979) is an Italian footballer who plays as a goalkeeper for Matelica.

== Career ==
Ginestra started his career at Serie C1 and Serie C2 clubs. He was signed by A.C. Milan in the late 1990s (1999 or 2000). During the 2000–01 season, he was loaned to Castel di Sangro along with Alberto Passoni from A.C. Milan.

He was one of the players who were signed by Milan and then sold to Internazionale in a player exchange, and gained "false profit" by inflating the nominal transfer fees in the 2000s (decade). He was exchanged with Matteo Bogani in 2001 and made both parties "gained" €3.5million, but Ginestra's gain was in terms of registration rights of Bogani, vice versa. Ginestra then loaned out immediately.

During the 2004–05 season, Ginestra remained at Vis Pesaro and met with his Inter "team-mate" Simone Giovanni Brunelli, Wellington and Marco Bonura, who also had an inflated transfer fee sold by Milan.

In June 2005, he was signed by Livorno at Serie A but on the last day of the transfer window joined AlbinoLeffe of Serie B on loan, in exchange with Paolo Acerbis, where he competed with Achille Coser. In mid-2006, he left for Ternana at Serie C1. In August 2007, he signed a new 2+1 contract with club. In February 2009, he last day of transfer windows, the left for Parma at Serie B on loan, as Nicola Pavarini's backup.

During the 2009–10 season, he became the backup of Stefano Visi along with Pasquale Cunzi. On 1 December 2010, he joined Paganese on a free transfer, ahead of Ugo Gabrieli as first choice.

On 1 July 2011, U.S. Foggia signed Ginestra on free transfer.

In July 2013, he was signed by Fano. He played for Fano also in the two following seasons.

On 7 September 2019, he joined Serie D club Notaresco Calcio.

On 12 December 2019, he returned to Fermana, signing a contract until 30 June 2021.
