= Ronny Toma =

Italian footballer (born 1983)

Personal information
- Full name: Ronny Diuk Toma
- Date of birth: 21 September 1983 (age 43)
- Place of birth: Treviglio, Italy
- Height: 1.85 m (6 ft 1 in)
- Position: Midfielder

Youth career
- A.C. Milan

Senior career*
Years	Team	Apps	(Gls)
2002–2003	A.C. Milan	0	(0)
2002–2003	→ Legnano (loan)	18	(0)
2003–2008	Inter Milan	0	(0)
2003–2005	→ Legnano (loan)	47	(2)
2005–2008	→ Pergocrema (loan)	37	(7)
2008–2009	Solbiatese Arno		
Total		102	(9)
- * Club domestic league appearances and goals

Ronny Diuk Toma (born 21 September 1983) is an Italian former footballer who played as a midfielder. He spent his whole professional career in Lombardy and Serie C2 (Italian 4th level).

== Career ==
Born in Treviglio, The Province of Bergamo, Toma started his career 35 km away at A.C. Milan. After spent a season at Legnano, he was signed by Inter Milan in a co-ownership deal. Along with Matteo Giordano, Simone Brunelli and Matteo Deinite moved to Inter, and Salvatore Ferraro, Alessandro Livi, Giuseppe Ticli and Marco Varaldi moved to A.C. Milan. Later the deal was criticized by press as made false profit to balance sheet, as the transfer fees was paid via player exchange, but in balance sheet, the nominal value could be adjusted by two clubs. The tactic is commonly used to make the transfer fees larger in Italian football.

He then remained at Legnano on loan until 2005. In 2005–06 season, he joined Serie C2 newcomer Pergocrema, which his loan was later extended.

In June 2008, the co-ownership deal with AC Milan ended, which Inter now wholly contracted with Toma. But he was released and joined Serie D side Solbiatese Arno.

He was released in July 2009.
