= Andrea Fabbrini =

Italian footballer (born 1974)

Personal information
- Date of birth: 29 November 1974 (age 51)
- Place of birth: Cassino, Italy
- Height: 1.80 m (5 ft 11 in)
- Position: Striker

Team information
- Current team: Novara (academy director)

Youth career
- Pinerolo

Senior career*
Years	Team	Apps	(Gls)
1992–1996	Pinerolo	114	(25)
1996–1999	Pro Vercelli	66	(18)
1999–2000	Crotone	31	(8)
2000–2003	Modena	89	(33)
2003–2004	→ Torino (loan)	42	(7)
2004–2005	Modena	36	(5)
2005–2006	Vicenza	24	(2)
2006–2007	Cuneo	31	(17)
2007–2009	Canavese	38	(7)
2009	Pro Vercelli	13	(1)
2009	Rivoli		
2019–2010	Chieri		

Managerial career
- 2013–2017: Torino (head of youth scouting)
- 2017–2019: Pro Vercelli (academy director)
- 2019–2020: Torino (academy director)
- 2020–2022: Torino (youth scouting coordinator)
- 2022–: Novara (academy director)
- * Club domestic league appearances and goals

Andrea Fabbrini (born 29 November 1974) is an Italian football official and a former striker who works at the academy of Novara.
