= Gabriel Oyola =

Argentinian association football player

Personal information
- Full name: Gabriel Gastón Oyola Rossi
- Date of birth: 25 September 1982 (age 44)
- Place of birth: Argentina
- Position: Defender

Senior career*
Years	Team	Apps	(Gls)
-2002	Talleres de Córdoba	4	(0)
2002-2004	Parma Calcio 1913	1	(0)
2004	Club Atlético Huracán	0	(0)
2005	Ferro Carril Oeste	14	(2)
2005-2006	Talleres de Córdoba		
2006-2007	Liga Deportiva Alajuelense→(loan)		
2007-2008	Talleres de Córdoba		
2008-2009	Club Olimpo	19	(0)
2010	Sportivo Italiano	1	(0)
2010-2011	Sportivo Las Parejas	3	(0)
- * Club domestic league appearances and goals

Gabriel Oyola (born 25 September 1982 in Argentina) is an Argentinean retired footballer.
