= Filippo Porcari =

Italian footballer

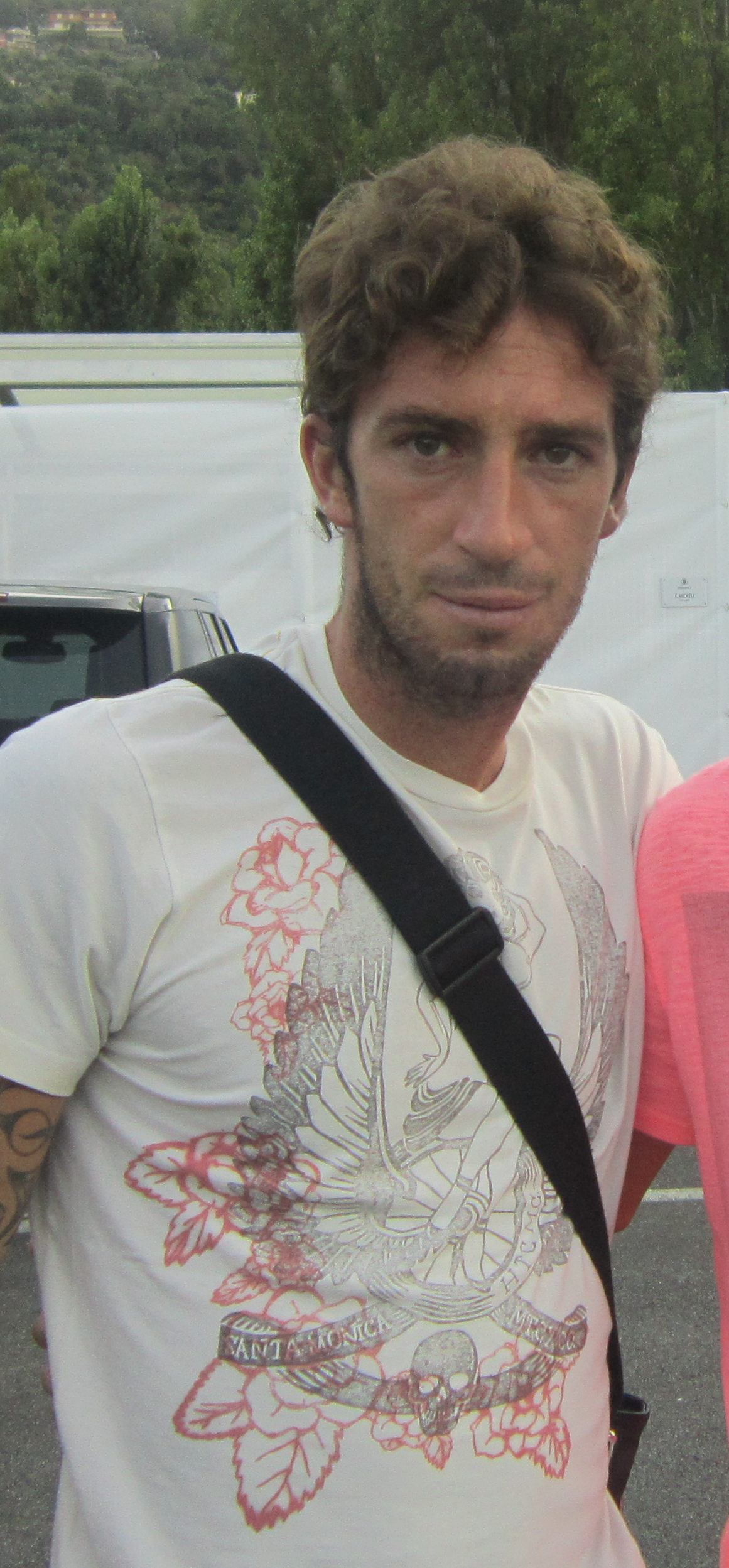

Personal information
- Date of birth: 28 April 1984 (age 42)
- Place of birth: Fidenza, Italy
- Height: 1.76 m (5 ft 9 in)
- Position: Midfielder

Team information
- Current team: Piacenza (technical coach & match analyst)

Senior career*
Years	Team	Apps	(Gls)
2002–2003	Parma	1	(0)
2003–2008	Milan	0	(0)
2003–2004	→ Padova (loan)	11	(0)
2004–2005	→ Pisa (loan)	20	(0)
2005–2006	→ Novara (loan)	29	(0)
2006–2008	→ Avellino (loan)	61	(1)
2008–2012	Novara	132	(5)
2012–2013	Spezia	35	(2)
2013–2015	Carpi	80	(1)
2015–2016	Bari	21	(0)
2016–2018	Cremonese	24	(1)
2017–2018	→ Triestina (loan)	32	(1)
2018–2019	Piacenza	20	(2)
2019–2020	Crema	18	(0)
2020–2022	Borgo San Donnino		
2022–2023	ASD Nibbiano & Valtidone		
Total		484	(13)

International career
2002	Italy U19	2	(0)
2005	Italy Mediterranean	3	(0)
- * Club domestic league appearances and goals

Filippo Porcari (born 28 April 1984) is an Italian former professional footballer who is currently as a technical coach and match analyst for Italian Serie D club Piacenza.

== Career ==
Born in Fidenza, the Province of Parma, Porcari started his career at hometown club Parma. He played his first match on 18 May 2003.

=== Milan ===
In June 2003, he was included in a multi-player transfer including Marco Donadel (€2 million), Davide Favaro (€1 million) and Mirko Stefani (€1 million) of Milan and Luca Ferretti (€1 million), Roberto Massaro (€2 million) and Porcari (€1 million) of Parma, all in co-ownership deal. In June 2004 Milan purchased Donadel (€800,00), Ferretti (€1,000) and Porcari (€1,000) outright, with Favaro (€1,000) and Stefani (€1,000) moved to Parma outright. Porcari spent 5 seasons on loan from 2003 to 2008.

=== Novara ===
Porcari was signed by Novara Calcio in summer 2008.

On 13 July 2011 he signed a new 3-year contract with Novara.

=== Spezia ===
On 4 July 2012 Porcari was signed by Spezia Calcio in a 2-year contract for €800,000 transfer fee. Novara signed Daniele Buzzegoli from Spezia in exchange, also for the same fee.

=== Carpi, Bari and Cremonese ===
On 2 September 2013 Porcari was transferred to Carpi on a free transfer in a 2-year contract. On 28 August 2015 Porcari was signed by Bari in a 2-year contract. In January 2016 he returned to the Carpi where it ends the season. In the summer he moved to Cremonese.

=== Crema ===
On 17 July 2019, he signed with Crema.

== Honours ==
- Lega Pro Prima Divisione: 2010 (Novara)
