= Paolo Acerbis =

Italian footballer

Personal information
- Full name: Paolo Domenico Acerbis
- Date of birth: 5 May 1981 (age 45)
- Place of birth: Clusone, Italy
- Height: 2.02 m (6 ft 7 1/2 in)
- Position: Goalkeeper

Team information
- Current team: AC Leon

Youth career
- 1998–1999: Alzano Virescit
- 1999–2000: AlbinoLeffe

Senior career*
Years	Team	Apps	(Gls)
2000–2008	AlbinoLeffe	137	(0)
2005–2006	→ Livorno (loan)	2	(0)
2008	Triestina	1	(0)
2008–2010	Grosseto	42	(0)
2009	→ Catania (loan)	1	(0)
2010–2012	Vicenza	1	(0)
2015–2016	Seregno	9	(0)
2016–2018	Trevigliese		(0)
2018–2020	Tritium	48	(0)
2020–2021	Giana Erminio	25	(0)
2021–2022	Mapello		
2022–2023	Tritium	2	(0)
2024–	AC Leon		
- * Club domestic league appearances and goals as of 12 November 2023

Paolo Domenico Acerbis (born 5 May 1981) is an Italian footballer who plays as a goalkeeper for Eccellenza club AC Leon.

He also played for professional club Livorno in Serie A, as well as AlbinoLeffe, Triestina, Catania and Vicenza. He was suspended from 2012 to 2014. Since January 2015 Acerbis had played for several non fully professional clubs in Serie D and in Eccellenza Lombardy.

== Career ==
After playing at AlbinoLeffe, from 2000 to 2005, he went on loan to Livorno, exchange with Paolo Ginestra then, in the Serie A, before returning to AlbinoLeffe at the end of the 2005–06 Serie A season.

He is the first choice goalkeeper since 2002.

In January 2008, he left AlbinoLeffe, for Triestina, to replace the left of Generoso Rossi who went to Catania in Serie A on loan as the third choice goal keeper.

In mid-2008 Acerbis joined Serie B side Grosseto, from Triestina. In Tuscany, Acerbis was the starting goalkeeper for the first part of the year before his January 2009 transfer to Catania.

On 3 January 2009 Acerbis signed for Serie A club Catania on loan, with Ciro Polito going to opposite direction. Both clubs would have the option to make the deals permanent at the end of the season. Acerbis became the third choice keeper at Catania behind veteran Albano Bizarri, and twenty-two-year-old Tomáš Košický.

On 31 August 2010 Acerbis was signed by Vicenza on a 2-year contract for €50,000 transfer fee. He was the backup keeper for Alberto Frison, Danilo Russo (2010–11) and Carlo Pinsoglio (2012).

=== Italian football scandal ===
He was one of the footballers that involved in 2011–12 Italian football scandal. After a plea bargain, he was suspended by Italian Football Federation for 2 1/2 years.

=== Non-professional years ===
Acerbis returned to football in January 2015, for Serie D, a division one tier lower than the fully professional league, the Lega Pro/Serie C. He left Seregno in June 2016.

In October 2016, he was signed by Eccellenza club Trevigliese. In mid-2018 he left for another Eccellenza club Tritium, which he won a Serie D promotion at the end of season.

=== Giana Erminio ===
On 30 January 2020, he returned to Serie C, signing with Giana Erminio.

=== Mapello ===
For the 2021-22 season, he joined to Eccellenza club S.S.D. Mapello.
