= Davide Bombardini =

Italian footballer (born 1974)

Personal information
- Full name: Davide Bombardini
- Date of birth: 21 June 1974 (age 52)
- Place of birth: Faenza, Italy
- Height: 1.82 m (6 ft 0 in)
- Position: Left midfielder

Senior career*
Years	Team	Apps	(Gls)
1991–1993	Imolese	39	(3)
1993–1994	Pisa	4	(0)
1994	Cesena	0	(0)
1994–1995	Castel di Sangro	3	(0)
1995–1996	Lanciano	23	(4)
1996–1997	Benevento	32	(5)
1997–1999	Reggina	19	(0)
1997–1998	→ Atletico Catania (loan)	26	(2)
1999	→ Acireale (loan)	13	(1)
1999–2002	Palermo	94	(15)
2002–2003	Roma	8	(0)
2003–2005	Salernitana	59	(4)
2005–2007	Atalanta	48	(3)
2007–2010	Bologna	61	(3)
2010–2011	AlbinoLeffe	37	(3)
Total		466	(43)
- * Club domestic league appearances and goals

Davide Bombardini (born 21 June 1974) is a retired Italian footballer who played as a midfielder.

== Career ==
=== Early career ===
Born in Faenza, Emilia–Romagna, 50 km southeast of Bologna, Bombardini started his senior career at Serie D side Imolese Calcio, located at Imola, The Province of Bologna. He then briefly played for Serie B side Pisa which is located in Tuscany region. He then signed by league rival Cesena of Emilia–Romagna. He then played for several Serie C1, Serie C2 and Serie D clubs before signed by southern Italy side Reggina. He was loaned to Serie C1 side Atletico Catania in October and Acireale in January 1999.

=== Palermo and Roma ===
Bombardini made his major breakthrough in 1999–2000 in Serie C1 when he signed for U.S. Città di Palermo, where he won the Serie C1 championship in 2001. During the team's next season, in Serie B, he scored 7 league goals.

In June 2002, he signed a 3-year contract for A.S. Roma worth around €0.95 million in gross annually and made his Serie A debut there, whose Roma chairman Franco Sensi was the owner of Palermo until July 2002. Bombardini cost Roma €11 million, but paid via the transfer of 50% registration rights of Franco Brienza who tagged for "€5.5 million", and €5.5 million cash. In 2002–03 financial year, both clubs write-down the value of its player asset, which Bombardini was valued for €540,000 at that time. The co-ownership deal also terminated during the season. However it was not truly write-down, as the residual €10.46 million was included in a special amortise fund along with other toxic player asset, and slowly amortise in 10-year period, which "worth" €80.189 million as asset on 30 June 2006. In 2006–07 financial year, as the club adopted IFRS as accounting standard, the fund was removed from the balance sheet and co-currently the net equity was re-calculated.

=== Salernitana & Atalanta ===
In summer 2003 he left for Serie B side Salernitana for free. He played until the bankrupt of the Salerno club. In summer 2005 he joined Serie B side Atalanta, which he played only 10 starts in 23 Serie A appearances at 2006–07 season.

=== Bologna and AlbinoLeffe ===
In summer 2007, he joined the team he supported from the childhood Bologna, played 16 starts in 30 Serie B appearances, won the Serie B runner-up with club and gained promotion. In the next season, he played 20 starts in 22 league appearances in the new role of Left Full-Back for the Serie A club, which successfully maintained their place in Serie A.

Despite offered a 1-year extension, In 2009–10 season, he only played 9 league matches before joined Serie B side AlbinoLeffe on 1 February 2010. He signed a contract until 30 June 2011. Bombardini wore no.3 and no.10 in his first and second season for Albino.

After he was sent off on 19 March 2011, he was banned 8-matches and fined €1,500.

== Personal life ==
Bombardini was engaged to Italian television personality and professional model Giorgia Palmas, from 2004 to 2011.

== Honours ==
Palermo

- Serie C1: 2001

Atalanta

- Serie B: 2006
