= Salvatore Del Sole =

Italian footballer

Personal information
- Full name: Salvatore Del Sole
- Date of birth: 27 May 1988 (age 38)
- Place of birth: Nola, Italy
- Height: 1.72 m (5 ft 7 1/2 in)
- Position: Midfielder

Youth career
- 2005–2006: Parma

Senior career*
Years	Team	Apps	(Gls)
2006–2008	Parma	0	(0)
2006–2007	→ Sanremese (loan)	24	(0)
2007–2008	→ Manfredonia (loan)	12	(0)
2008–2009	→ Carpenedolo (loan)	25	(1)
2009–2010	Perugia	0	(0)
2010	→ Carrarese (loan)	12	(0)
2010–2013	San Marino	55	(2)
2013–2014	Rimini	24	(0)
- * Club domestic league appearances and goals as of end of 13–14 season

Salvatore Del Sole (born 27 May 1988) is an Italian footballer who played in the third and fourth tiers of football in Italy.

== Biography ==
Born in Nola, Campania, Del Sole started his career at Parma, an Emilia club. He played at their Primavera Team in 2005–06 season. In 2006–07 season, he left for Serie C2 side Sanremese in co-ownership deal for €500, where he played 24 league matches. In June 2007, he was bought back by Parma, then loaned to Serie C1 side Manfredonia. After an unsuccessful season, he was sold to Carpenedolo of Lega Pro Seconda Divisione in another co-ownership deal for €500. In June 2009, he was bought back by Parma again and sold to Perugia Calcio in July 2009. He signed a 3-year contract. After played nil for Perugia, he was loaned to Carrarese in January 2010.

In 2010, he was signed by San Marino Calcio. In July 2013 he was signed by Rimini. The club relegated at the end of season.
