= Luigi Panarelli =

Italian footballer and manager

Personal information
- Date of birth: 26 April 1976 (age 50)
- Place of birth: Taranto, Italy
- Height: 1.87 m (6 ft 2 in)
- Position: Defender

Youth career
- ?–1995: Taranto

Senior career*
Years	Team	Apps	(Gls)
1994–1996	Taranto	38	(3)
1996–1999	Napoli	20	(0)
1999	Andria	15	(1)
1999–2002	Torino	5	(0)
2001–2002	→ Crotone (loan)	7	(0)
2002–2004	Roma	0	(0)
2002–2003	→ Florentia Viola (loan)	13	(1)
2003–2004	→ Taranto (loan)	24	(1)
2004–2005	Teramo	7	(0)
2005–2006	Avellino	14	(1)
2006–2007	Salernitana	0	(0)
2007	Foggia	4	(0)
2007–2008	Cavese	16	(0)
2008–2009	Sorrento	28	(0)
2009–2010	Brindisi	17	(1)
2010–2011	Taranto	8	(0)
2012	Treviso	7	(0)
2012–2013	Cynthia	7	(0)
2013	Aversa Normanna	4	(0)
2013–2014	Gelbison	4	(0)
2014–2016	Team Altamura	0	(0)

Managerial career
- 2016–2017: Team Altamura
- 2018–2019: Taranto
- 2019–2020: Taranto
- 2020–2021: Fidelis Andria
- 2022: Casertana
- 2023–2024: Matera
- 2024: Manfredonia
- 2024–2025: Igea Virtus
- 2025–2026: Taranto
- * Club domestic league appearances and goals

Luigi Panarelli (born 26 April 1976) is an Italian football coach and a former player who played as a defender.

== Playing career ==
=== Early career ===
Panarelli started his career at hometown club Taranto. He won Serie D Champion in 1995. He played another season at Serie C2 before joining Serie A side S.S.C. Napoli, which he failed to play regularly. He followed Napoli, relegated to Serie B in 1998, but just played three times before joining league rival Andria. In the summer of 1999, he joined Serie A side Torino and followed the team, relegated in 2000 but just played five times in 2 seasons. In summer 2001, he left on loan to Serie B side Crotone as he was the surplus of Torino for the Serie A campaign.

=== Roma and loans ===
In the summer of 2002, he was signed by AS Roma in a co-ownership deal. That season Torino signed Alberto Maria Fontana (tagged for €5.5M), Giammarco Frezza (tagged for €5M) Daniele Martinetti (tagged for €1.6M) in co-ownership deal and Roma signed Panarelli in co-ownership deal for €5M, Gabriele Paoletti for €5.5M, Alberto Schettino for €1.6M, which made there were no cash involved but generate €12.1M transfer income to both parties and €12.1M cost to amortize in instalments, generate "profit" in the first season. Panarelli signed a 3-year contract, then being loaned out to Serie C2 side Florentia Viola, the new club to replace the bankrupted A.C. Fiorentina, but failed to play regularly. The next season, he left for his hometown club Taranto and played 24 matches in Serie C1. In June 2004, Torino signed the rights of Frezza, Fontana and Martinetti for free, and Roma signed Paoletti for free and Panarelli Schettino for just €60,000 in total. Panarelli then left for Teramo on loan.

=== Avellino ===
In August 2005, Panarelli signed a contract with Avellino. He was not a regular on the team, and in March 2006, he appeared in a reality TV show without asking the club's permission.

=== Lega Pro ===
He then released by Avellino and in November 2006 signed a contract with Salernitana. But on 31 January 2007 he joined U.S. Foggia. In August 2007, he signed an annual contract with Cavese. In 2008–09 season, he played regularly for Prima Divisione side Sorrento. In August 2009, he was signed by Seconda Divisione side Brindisi, where he played 17 out of the first 18 matches. In January 2010, he returned to Taranto.

== Coaching career ==
After retirement, Panarelli became a coach, making his managerial debut in charge of Altamura in 2016. He successively took over at Serie D club Taranto in two different stints (from August 2018 to May 2019 and successively from October 2019 to May 2020). He then served as head coach of Fidelis Andria for the 2020–21 Serie D season, which saw his club finish in third place and then be readmitted to Serie C to fill a vacancy. Confirmed in charge of Fidelis Andria for the new season, he was dismissed on 11 October 2021 due to poor results.

He then briefly served as head coach of Serie D club Casertana from 1 November to 28 December 2022.

Panarelli successively coached Serie D amateur club Matera from September 2023 to April 2024.

For one month he became for third time the coach of Taranto, but on 4 January 2026 Ciro Danucci returned in his place.

== Honours ==
- Serie B: 2001
- Serie D: 1995
