= Matteo Giordano =

Italian footballer (born 1984)

Personal information
- Date of birth: 23 October 1984 (age 42)
- Place of birth: Sanremo, Italy
- Height: 1.84 m (6 ft 0 in)
- Position: Defender

Youth career
- Torino
- 2001–2003: AC Milan

Senior career*
Years	Team	Apps	(Gls)
2003–2007	Internazionale	0	(0)
2003–2004	→ Castel di Sangro (loan)	10	(1)
2004–2005	→ Montichiari (loan)	18	(0)
2005–2006	→ Lugano (loan)	15	(0)
2006–2007	→ Olbia (loan)	1	(0)
2007–2008	Sanremese	?	(?)
Total		44	(0)
- * Club domestic league appearances and goals

Matteo Giordano (born 23 October 1984) is an Italian footballer who plays as a defender.

== Career ==
Born in Sanremo, Liguria region, Matteo Giordano started his career at Torino Calcio, then AC Milan, Lombardy and played on their Primavera Team.

In summer 2003, he was involved a swap deal with F.C. Internazionale Milano, in which Giordano, Ronny Diuk Toma, Simone Brunelli and Matteo Deinite moved to Internazionale, while Salvatore Ferraro, Alessandro Livi, Giuseppe Ticli and Marco Varaldi moved to A.C. Milan. Later, the deal was criticized by the press as making false profit on the balance sheet, as the transfer fees were paid via player exchange, but in the balance sheet, the nominal value could be adjusted by two clubs. The tactic is commonly used to make the transfer fees larger in Italian football.

He then left on loan to Castel di Sangro, A.C. Montichiari and Olbia at Serie C2, and Lugano at Swiss Challenge League.

In June 2007, the co-ownership agreement ended with Inter fully contracted with Giordano, but he was released to join hometown club Sanremese of Serie D.
