= Giammarco Frezza =

Italian footballer (born 1975)

Personal information
- Date of birth: 12 September 1975 (age 51)
- Place of birth: Rome, Italy
- Height: 1.78 m (5 ft 10 in)
- Position: Midfielder

Youth career
- 1992–1993: Lodigiani
- 1993–1994: Viterbese

Senior career*
Years	Team	Apps	(Gls)
1994–1995	Lodigiani	31	(0)
1995–2001	Internazionale	0	(0)
1995–1996	→ Salernitana (loan)	26	(0)
1996–1998	→ Fidelis Andria (loan)	44	(4)
1998–1999	→ Chievo (loan)	32	(1)
1999	→ Treviso (loan)	4	(0)
1999–2001	→ Savoia (loan)	58	(7)
2001–2002	Roma	0	(0)
2001–2002	→ Palermo (loan)	9	(0)
2002–2004	Torino	10	(1)
2004	→ Pescara (loan)	21	(0)
2004–2005	Fidelis Andria	29	(5)
2005–2006	Foggia	30	(3)
2006–2007	Gallipoli	31	(0)
2007–2009	Cavese	52	(2)
2009–2010	Potenza	32	(0)
2010–2011	Barletta	22	(0)

International career
1997	Italy U21	1	(0)
- * Club domestic league appearances and goals as of 25 July 2011

Giammarco Frezza (born 12 September 1975) is a former Italian footballer.

== Biography ==
Although he never played for Internazionale, Frezza was called up to take the squad photo with Nerazzurri in August 1996. He was loaned to various clubs before being transferred to A.S. Roma in exchange for Alessandro Frau in July 2001. Which sent him to sister club Palermo which also owned by Franco Sensi. In summer 2002, he was exchanged with Luigi Panarelli of Torino.

He made his Serie A debut on 29 September 2002 against Modena F.C.

In June 2009, he was signed by Potenza. In September 2009. he left for Barletta as a free agent.
