= Matteo Deinite =

Italian footballer (born 1983)

Personal information
- Date of birth: 23 April 1983 (age 43)
- Place of birth: Monselice, Italy
- Height: 1.73 m (5 ft 8 in)
- Position: Midfielder

Youth career
- A.C. Milan

Senior career*
Years	Team	Apps	(Gls)
2002–2003	A.C. Milan	0	(0)
2002–2003	→ Trento (loan)	23	(0)
2003–2007	Internazionale	0	(0)
2003–2007	→ Pizzighettone (loan)	112	(7)
2007–2010	Portogruaro	23	(2)
2008–2009	→ Sangiovannes (loan)	29	(3)
2010–2011	Legnago	31	(2)

International career
1999	Italy U15	3	(0)
2000	Italy U16	4	(1)
- * Club domestic league appearances and goals

Matteo Deinite (born 23 April 1983) is an Italian former professional footballer who played as a midfielder.

== Career ==
=== A.C. Milan ===
Born in Monselice, Veneto, Matteo Deinite started his career at A.C. Milan at Lombardy. In the 2002–03 season, he left the youth team and joined Trento Calcio 1921, on loan, where he played 23 Serie C2 matches.

=== Inter & Pizzighettone ===
In summer 2003, he was involved in a swap deal with F.C. Internazionale Milano, where Matteo Giordano, Ronny Diuk Toma, Simone Brunelli and Deinite moved to Internazionale, and Salvatore Ferraro, Alessandro Livi, Giuseppe Ticli and Marco Varaldi moved to A.C. Milan. Later, the deal was criticized by the press as making false profit (and intangible asset) on the balance sheet, as the transfer fees was paid via player exchange, but in the balance sheet, the nominal value could be adjusted by two clubs. The tactic is commonly used to make the transfer fees larger in Italian football.

He then left on loan to Pizzighettone of Serie C2, and later the deal was extended. He won promotion playoffs in 2005 and the loan deal was extended again, and Inter team-mate Alberto Quadri joined him on loan.

Pizzighettone survived from relegation, and he remained at Pizzighettone for another season. But 2006–07 season, Deinite suffered his first relegation with team.

=== Portogruaro Summaga ===
In June 2007, the co-ownership agreement ended with Inter fully contracted with Deinite, but he was then transferred to Portogruaro Summaga of Serie C2, returned to Veneto. He won promotion playoffs again, but he was sent to Sangiovannese of Lega Pro Seconda Divisione on loan.

In 2009–10 season, he returned to Portogruaro, but played nil at Lega Pro Prima Divisione. However, he played in Supercoppa di Lega di Prima Divisione.

=== International career ===
He played at 2000 UEFA European Under-16 Football Championship qualification.
