= Italian Law 91/1981, Article 18B =

2003 Italian law

Articolo 18-bis Legge 91/1981 (Article 18B of Law no. 91 of 1981), also known as Decreto Spalmadebiti (Debt-Rubbing Decree) and Decreto Salva Calcio (Save Football Decree), is an Italian decree-law introduced in 2003 by Law no. 27 of 2003, itself ratified the Law no. 282 of 2002 issued by the then Prime Minister of Italy and owner of AC Milan, Silvio Berlusconi, for which reason the law was considered among Berlusconi's many ad personam laws and an example of sportwashing. Officially known as the Tax Law Decree: 2.5% Tax Shield, Disposal of Properties and VAT Numbers, it was issued by the second Berlusconi government on 24 December 2002 and then converted into law by the Italian Parliament on 21 February 2003 with the Law no. 27 of 2003.

The law, which received widespread criticism including from the European Union, allows football clubs to defer the amortization expense of intangible assets (player contracts) into 10 equal annual installments. Generally speaking, transfer fees paid to other clubs were capitalized as intangible assets. In accounting, tangible assets were depreciated and intangible assets amortized. At that time, Italian clubs had broken the world transfer record several times. Most clubs relied on player profit as a revenue source, with cash-plus-player deals the most popular method of increasing profit. For example, Juventus FC signed Gianluigi Buffon and Lilian Thuram for a total of ₤180 million (€92.96 million); Parma Calcio also received Jonathan Bachini for an undisclosed fee and Juventus earned €10 million on Bachini.

In some cases, high-priced player trades were used to increase short-term profit, stressing future budgets. Vratislav Greško, who was signed for one year by FC Internazionale Milano for DM9.5 million (€4.857 million), was sold to Parma in 2002 for €16 million; Matías Almeyda, who joined Parma with Hernán Crespo, also sold from Parma to Inter for €16 million. Both Greško and Almeyda left the club after one and two years, respectively, for an undisclosed fee and free transfer. A similar situation occurred to Parma and AS Roma in 2001: Amedeo Mangone, Paolo Poggi, and Sergei Gurenko were priced at a total of ₤65 million (€33,569,698) in a trade with Diego Fuser, Raffaele Longo, and Saliou Lassissi. In practice, Fuser played only briefly for Roma and Gurenko only briefly for Parma. Roma also traded with other clubs in June 2002 (the end of the 2001–02 financial year), including Luigi Sartor (€9.5 million) for Sebastiano Siviglia (€9 million). Inter (€-319 million), Milan (€-242 million), Roma (€-234 million), and SS Lazio (€-213 million) were the most indebted clubs, while ACF Fiorentina declared bankruptcy by insolvency in 2002. All professional clubs in the country, with the exception of Serie A's Juventus and Serie B's UC Sampdoria, had relieved its debt with this law.

== Background ==
In 2002, the world of Italian association football was suffering from serious debt problems, in part due to the use of accounting tricks of dubious legality, which led to many clubs on the verge of bankruptcy due to excessive debt. Inter (€-319 million), Milan (€-242 million), Roma (€-234 million), and Lazio (€-215 million) were the most indebted clubs at the time; one club (Fiorentina) went bankrupt after being declared insolvent that year.

== Decree-law ==
The football-saving decree law took its name from the accounting facilities for sports clubs, referred to in Article 3; among these were the possibility of spreading the players' assets over ten years. A further facilitation, the possibility of deducting the devaluation of the player's card for tax purposes, was later removed on the recommendation of Mario Monti, the then European Commissioner for Competition. Among the other provisions contained in the decree, the rate for the return of capital from abroad (tax shield) was lowered to 2.5%, and the dismissal (sale) of some real estate owned by the Italian state was envisaged. The decree was taken advantage of by all professional clubs, with the exception of Juventus and Sampdoria.

== Examples ==
After the establishment of the amortization fund, amortization was lower in general. After the players became free agents, their deferred value was still counted as assets; this was unacceptable by International Financial Reporting Standards (IFRS) or Italian standards. The deferment was borrowing future income. Although future team resources would be limited; according to a University of Salerno research paper, the deferred cost might allow a club to utilize the tax allowance more effectively.

Team	Fund size	Amortization (2001–02)	Amortization (2002–03)	Change
Lazio	€213 million	€75.5m	€21.3m + €16.4m	▼€37.7m

Changes in amortization may be due to investment of player assets or player contract extensions; the amortization time frame may also affect its amount. It was reported that 15 clubs had set up such special amortization fund, for example Inter, Milan, and Roma.

== Reactions ==
Roberto Maroni of Lega Nord, at the time Italian Minister of Labour and Social Policies, defined the law as "a gift to football teams". Rocco Buttiglione, the Italian Minister of Community Policies, commented that "it is not a law that has the purpose of state aid because there is no direct transfer of resources from the state budget to the budget of sports clubs." Carlo Giovanardi, the then minister for relations with Parliament, when answering a question in the Italian Parliament, said that there would be a tax advantage for the state, an argument based on the assumption that without this law some football clubs would inevitably go bankrupt, resulting in a loss of revenue for the state. Adriano Galliani, the then president of Lega Calcio and managing director of Milan, a club that was able to save its debt following the law, and who was in favour of the government initiative, was later contested by the organized supporters of several clubs, with banners stating that the money used to finance the law came from the average Italian. The Italian jurist Victor Uckmar defined the law as "false accounting [being] legalized".

== Aftermath ==
The European Union rejected the law in 2003 and 2005. The clubs faced another shortfall in 2007; they had to abolish the amortization fund by 30 June 2007, five years before the original scheduled date. UEFA required all clubs to use IFRS, and the fund was incompatible with the standard. This came after Law no. 115 of 2005 abolished Article 18B.

=== Effects ===
Before 2006, SSC Napoli was bankrupt when its owner refused to increase share capital in 2004 but the club was revived debt-free as a new company by current owner Aurelio De Laurentiis. When Parma was under administration, most of its toxic assets were written off and its balance sheet was transferred to new company Parma FC SpA. Roma recapitalized several times during the 2003–04 Serie A season, swinging between positive and negative net equity since 2006. During the 2005–06 Serie A season, Roma had a net equity of €67,808,577 in a separate balance sheet, with the special 10-year fund of €80,189,123 on the asset side; if the fund was entirely deferred amortization, (Note: In descending order, the €80 million included Gabriele Paoletti (€6.564 million), Davide Bombardini (€6.276 million), Luigi Panarelli (€5.964 million), Saliou Lassissi (€5.163 million), Luigi Sartor (€4.722 million), Giuseppe Cattivera (€4.317 million), Raffaele Longo (€4.215 million), and Ivan Pelizzoli (€4.069 million); most had left the club.) the club had a negative equity of €12,380,546 on the separate balance sheet. Using IFRS in the 2006–07 financial year, Roma had a 2005–06 negative net equity of €22,980,335 on the separate balance sheet reported on 30 June 2006. The club created a subsidiary, Soccer SAS di Brand Management, revaluing the brand at €125.122 million. Although Lazio had a positive equity of €29,637,929 with the special fund at €127,746,321, if the fund contained deferred amortization only, the club had a negative equity of €98,108,392. In 2006–07, Lazio also changed to IFRS, with a reclassified negative net equity for the previous season of €25,406,939. The club overcome the shortfall on a separate balance sheet with subsidiary SS Lazio Marketing & Communication, selling its brand to the subsidiary for €104.5 million; this boosted the separate balance sheet but not the consolidated one. Inter and Milan made similar moves, despite large cash injections by the owner of both clubs.

It is widely considered one of Berlusconi's ad personam laws (a type of clientelism) in favour of his own business; the other was the Lentini affair in 1995, in which he secretly paid €5 million to Torino FC for the footballer Gianluigi Lentini but the statute of limitations expired due to the new laws on false accounting approved by Berlusconi's government. The aforementioned decriminalization of false accounting during the second Berlusconi government allowed Inter Milan and Milan to be acquitted in 2008 for charges of false accounting that would have allowed the clubs to pay for the registration to the 2004–05 Serie A season. Additionally, from 1991 to 1997, when Berlusconi was the club's chairman and not honorary, Milan won four scudetti that, according to the thesis of the Milan public prosecutor's office, they should not have been able to play because they were not in compliance with the budget parameters set by the Italian Football Federation, and were able to do so after falsifying the balance sheet under the Galliani management. Galliani was indicted in 2001 but the trial was postponed, allowing the statute of limitations to hit in July 2002, the same year of the decriminalizion of false accounting.

Despite being the sole Serie A club to not benefit from the law, as it was financially successful under the Luciano Moggi–Antonio Giraudo–Roberto Bettega management, Juventus were investigated under allegations of false accounting and capital gains; the club under Giovanni Cobolli Gigli and Jean-Claude Blanc offered a plea bargain, which was rejected by the judge Dante Cibinel. Unlike the Inter and Milan cases, both the club and its former directors were acquitted con formula piena, which is distinct from acquittals that may result from a lack of evidence for conviction or because the act does not constitute a crime, meaning that they were acquitted because they did not commit any of the crimes they were charged for. The summary judgment was issued by Cibinel on 24 November 2009.

== Bibliography ==
- "Legge 91/1981" (PDF). FIGC (in Italian). Italian Football Federation. 11 November 2003.
- Morrow, Stephen (May 2006). "Impression management in football club financial reporting" (Archive of the University of Stirling). International Journal of Sport Finance. 1 (2): 96–108.
