= Marco Varaldi =

Italian footballer (born 1982)

Personal information
- Date of birth: 21 July 1982 (age 44)
- Place of birth: Milan, Italy
- Height: 1.80 m (5 ft 11 in)
- Position: Goalkeeper

Youth career
- ?–2001: Internazionale

Senior career*
Years	Team	Apps	(Gls)
2000–2003	Internazionale	0	(0)
2001–2003	→ Giulianova (loan)	24	(0)
2003–2008	A.C. Milan	0	(0)
2003–2004	→ Legnano (loan)	0	(0)
2004–2005	→ Biellese (loan)	32	(0)
2005–2006	→ SPAL (loan)	3	(0)
2006–2008	→ Lecco (loan)	12	(0)
2008–2009	Vigor Lamezia	0	(0)
Total		71	(0)

International career
1998	Italy U16	3	(0)
1998	Italy U17	2	(0)
1999	Italy U18	1	(0)
- * Club domestic league appearances and goals

Marco Varaldi (born 21 July 1982) is an Italian footballer who plays as a goalkeeper. He spent his whole professional career at Serie C1 and Serie C2.

== Club career ==
Varaldi started his career at Internazionale. In 2000–01 season, he occasionally played as unused bench for the first team, including 2000 Supercoppa Italiana. He also played for Primavera Team (U20 Youth Team) at 2001 Torneo di Viareggio.

He then left on loan to Giulianova of Serie C1, where he worked as Liam Ardigo's backup. In the second season, he played ahead Ardigo. But he was not played in the relegation playoffs that Giulianova won.

In June 2003, he was involved in a swap deal between Inter and A.C. Milan, which Varaldi (50% valued €1.75 million), Alessandro Livi (50% valued €1.725 million), Salvatore Ferraro (50% valued €1.75 million) and Giuseppe Ticli (50% valued €1.75 million) moved to AC Milan; Matteo Giordano (50% valued €1.5 million), Ronny Toma (50% valued €1.5 million), Simone Brunelli (50% valued €1.5 million) and Matteo Deinite (50% valued €1.5 million) moved to Inter. Later the deal was criticized by press as made false profit to balance sheet, as the transfer fees were paid via player exchange, but on the balance sheet, the nominal value could be adjusted by the two clubs. The tactic is commonly used to make the transfer fees larger in Italian football.

He then left for Legnano, as Enrico Maria Malatesta's backup. In the next season, he played as the regular starter for Biellese of Serie C2, but not played in the relegation playoffs that Biellese lost in aggregate, in although Biellese re-admitted to Serie C2 next season. In summer 2005, he left for SPAL, as Emanuele Nordi's backup. In summer 2006, he signed for Lecco, where he played 2 seasons as Luca Mazzoni's backup.

In June 2008, the co-ownership deal with Inter ended, which AC Milan now wholly contracted with Varaldi for €50,000 (and Ronny Toma wholly with Inter for €150,000; i.e. €100,000 cash from Inter to Milan, a reverse of 2007 cash flow). But then he was released and joined Vigor Lamezia of Lega Pro Seconda Divisione (ex-Serie C2), as Andrea Panico's one of the backup.

== International career ==
Varaldi has capped for Italy at U16 level (by-then called U15 team, as the feeder team that below the team that participate in UEFA European Under-16 Football Championship), U17 and U18 level (by-then called U17 team, a feeder team for the team that participate in UEFA European Under-18 Football Championship), all were friendly matches.
