= Alessandro Livi =

Italian footballer (born 1982)

Personal information
- Date of birth: 13 January 1982 (age 44)
- Place of birth: Milan, Italy
- Height: 1.70 m (5 ft 7 in)
- Position: Midfielder

Youth career
- Internazionale

Senior career*
Years	Team	Apps	(Gls)
2001–2003	Internazionale	0	(0)
2001–2002	→ Fiorenzuola (loan)	19	(1)
2002–2003	→ Meda (loan)	12	(0)
2003–2005	A.C. Milan	0	(0)
2003–2005	→ Legnano (loan)	47	(2)
2005–2006	Lecco	1	(0)
2006–2008	Rovigo	13	(0)
Total		92	(3)
- * Club domestic league appearances and goals

Alessandro Livi (born 13 January 1982) is an Italian footballer who plays as a midfielder.

== Career ==
Livi started his career at Internazionale. He played for Primavera Team (U20 Youth Team) at 2001 Torneo di Viareggio. He then left for Fiorenzuola and Meda on loan.

In summer 2003, he was involved a swap deal with A.C. Milan, which Livi, Salvatore Ferraro, Giuseppe Ticli and Marco Varaldi moved to AC Milan (Livi for €1.725M, 3 others for €1.75M each); Matteo Giordano, Ronny Diuk Toma, Simone Brunelli and Matteo Deinite moved to Inter (€1.5M each). Later the deal was criticized by press as made false profit to balance sheet, as the transfer fees was paid via player exchange, but in balance sheet, the nominal value could be adjusted by two clubs. The tactics is commonly used to make the transfer fees larger in Italian football.

Livi was loaned to Legnano for two seasons. In June 2005, AC Milan bought all the remain registration rights (with retired Brunelli moved to Inter outright for free), and sent Livi to Lecco. In summer 2006, he moved to Rovigo and ended his professional career there.

In 2012, he competed in Gran Hermano 12+1, the thirteenth season of Spain's Big Brother, getting the fourth place. He subsequently won the spin-off series Gran Hermano: La Revuelta. In 2020, he participated in the second season of La isla de las tentaciones, the spanish version of Temptation Island, alongside her then girlfriend Patry Guimeras.
