= Roberto Massaro =

Italian footballer

Personal information
- Date of birth: 26 July 1983 (age 43)
- Place of birth: Brindisi, Italy
- Height: 1.78 m (5 ft 10 in)
- Position: Forward

Youth career
- ?–2002: Fiorentina
- 2002–2003: Parma

Senior career*
Years	Team	Apps	(Gls)
2001–2002	Fiorentina	1	(0)
2002–2003	Parma	0	(0)
2003–2008	A.C. Milan	0	(0)
2003–2004	→ Como (loan)	7	(0)
2004–2005	→ Salernitana (loan)	6	(0)
2005	→ Ancona (loan)	16	(0)
2005–2006	→ Triestina (loan)	1	(0)
2006	→ Olbia (loan)	6	(0)
2006–2007	→ Pavia (loan)	22	(2)
2007–2008	→ Varese (loan)	0	(0)
2008–2009	Olbia	1	(0)
2009–2010	San Marino	22	(4)

International career
2000–2001	Italy U17	6	(0)
2001	Italy U19	7	(2)
2003	Italy U20	2	(0)
- * Club domestic league appearances and goals

Roberto Massaro (born 26 July 1983) is an Italian former footballer who played as a forward.

== Career ==
Born in Brindisi, southern Italy, Massaro started his professional career at AC Fiorentina of Florence. He played his only match in Serie A on 10 June 2001. After the bankruptcy of La Viola, he joined Parma AC in August 2002. In summer 2003 he was included in a 6-men swap, which Massaro (for €2M), Filippo Porcari and Luca Ferretti of Parma swap for Davide Favaro, Marco Donadel (for €2M), and Mirko Stefani of Milan, all in co-ownership deal. He then spent 4 seasons on loan to clubs in Serie B, Serie C1 and Serie C2.

In June 2007, Milan got full registration rights for another €90,000, but Massaro then transferred to Varese. Since January 2008 he played for Olbia, but just played once. In June 2008, Olbia signed him on a free transfer.
