= Salvatore Ferraro =

Italian footballer (born 1983)

Personal information
- Date of birth: 8 September 1983 (age 43)
- Place of birth: Catanzaro, Italy
- Height: 1.81 m (5 ft 11 in)
- Position: Centre-back

Youth career
- –2002: Inter Milan

Senior career*
Years	Team	Apps	(Gls)
2002	Inter Milan	1	(0)
2003	→ Prato (loan)	8	(0)
2003–2008	A.C. Milan	0	(0)
2003–2004	→ Pavia (loan)	23	(0)
2004–2005	→ Rimini (loan)	4	(0)
2005	→ Vittoria (loan)	18	(0)
2005–2006	→ Lumezzane (loan)	27	(0)
2006–2007	→ San Marino (loan)	25	(1)
2007–2008	→ Benevento (loan)	39	(2)
2008–2010	Benevento	43	(4)
2010–2011	Lanciano	22	(0)
2011–2013	Ternana	64	(0)
2013–2015	Catanzaro	49	(0)
2015	Grosseto	8	(0)
2015–2016	Tuttocuoio	27	(2)
2016–2017	Pro Patria	27	(0)
2017	Mantova	13	(0)
2017–2018	Forlì	17	(1)
2018–2019	Pomigliano	26	(1)
2019	Forlì	4	(0)
2019	Cattolica San Marino	10	(3)

International career
1999	Italy U15	3	(0)
2000	Italy U16	4	(0)
2000–2001	Italy U17	9	(1)
2001	Italy U19	6	(1)
2002	Italy U20	3	(0)
- * Club domestic league appearances and goals

Salvatore Ferraro (born 8 September 1983) is an Italian former professional footballer who played as a centre-back.

== Club career ==
Ferraro started his career at Inter Milan. In 2001-2002 he was part of the Nerazzurri youth team, but made his debut against Feyenoord on 11 April 2002, playing 90 minutes in the return leg of the UEFA Cup semifinal. A few days later, he played his only Serie A game, replacing Clarence Seedorf in the clash against Chievo. In January 2003, he was graduated from Primavera Team (under-20 Team), he was loaned to Prato of Serie C1.

=== A.C. Milan ===
Ferraro (half of rights were valued at €1.75 million), along with Alessandro Livi, Giuseppe Ticli (50% valued €1.75 million) and Marco Varaldi (half of the rights valued €1.75 million) were moved to city rival A.C. Milan, and Matteo Giordano (50% valued €1.5 million), Ronny Diuk Toma (50% valued €1.5 million), Simone Brunelli and Matteo Deinite (50% valued €1.5 million) moved to Inter. Both clubs co-owned the eight players. The deal was later criticized as using player transfer to make false profit in the balance sheet, it is because the transfer fees were paid via player exchange, but the transfer fees in the balance sheet could be adjusted by the two clubs.

He was immediately left on loan to Pavia of Serie C1.

In summer 2004, he was loaned to Rimini of Serie C1, and then to Vittoria, also in Serie C1.

In summer 2005, he moved to Lumezzane of Serie C1.

In summer 2006, he moved to San Marino of Serie C1.

=== Benevento ===
In summer 2007, A.C. Milan bought remaining half player's rights from Inter, for €300,000 (while Giuseppe Ticli's half for €100,000; Giordano to Inter for €50,000, Deinite for €250,000, which only €100,000 cash involved from Milan to Inter, and in 2008 deal between Varaldi and Toma solved by Inter paid Milan the same amount), and Ferraro moved to Benevento of Serie C2 on loan. In summer 2008, he terminated his remaining contract with Milan to join Benevento in free transfer. It made Milan registered an accounting losses of €25,000.

=== Lanciano & Ternana ===
In July 2010, he was signed by Lanciano in a two-year contract. In July 2011 he was transferred to Ternana.

== International career ==
Ferraro played in the 2000 UEFA European Under-16 Football Championship qualification for the Italy national under-16 football team (now equivalent to the under-17 team). He was then capped for the U-17 team, the feeder team of U-18 team (now equivalent to the U-19 team). In mid-2001, he was promoted to the U-19 team and played a few friendlies. In August 2002 he was selected to the U-20 team for a youth event in Alcúdia.
