= Giuseppe Ticli =

Italian footballer (1979–2024)

Personal information
- Date of birth: 5 April 1979
- Place of birth: Vizzolo Predabissi, Italy
- Date of death: 18 January 2024 (aged 44)
- Height: 1.73 m (5 ft 8 in)
- Position: Midfielder

Youth career
- Internazionale

Senior career*
Years	Team	Apps	(Gls)
1999–2003	Internazionale	0	(0)
1999–2000	→ Padova (loan)	29	(4)
2000–2001	→ Arezzo (loan)	12	(0)
2001–2002	Reggiana	14	(2)
2002	→ San Marino Calcio (loan)	11	(0)
2002–2003	Internazionale	0	(0)
2002–2003	→ Monza (loan)	31	(0)
2003–2007	A.C. Milan	0	(0)
2003–2004	→ Monza (loan)	21	(1)
2004–2005	→ Lanciano (loan)	25	(2)
2005–2006	→ Catanzaro (loan)	1	(0)
2006–2007	→ Pro Patria (loan)	34	(0)
2008	Pavia	4	(0)
Total		182	(9)

International career
1998–1999	Italy U20	4	(0)
- * Club domestic league appearances and goals

Giuseppe Ticli (5 April 1979 – 18 January 2024) was an Italian footballer who played as a midfielder. He spent his whole professional career at lower division, especially in Serie C1 and Serie C2. Ticli died on 18 January 2024, at the age of 44.

== Career ==
Born in Vizzolo Predabissi, The Province of Milan, Ticli started his career at Internazionale. In mid-1999, he left on loan to Padova of Serie C2, then Arezzo of Serie C1, along with Nello Russo, Giovanni Passiglia and Cristian Lizzori. In 2001–02 season, he played for Reggiana of Serie C1, which the club signed him in a co-ownership deal for 1,000 million lire (€516,457), and San Marino Calcio of Serie C2. In June 2002 Inter bought back Ticli and he signed for Monza of Serie C2, the only club he played for two seasons.

In summer 2003, he was involved in a swap deal with A.C. Milan, which Ticli, Alessandro Livi, Salvatore Ferraro, and Marco Varaldi moved to AC Milan (50% for €1.75 million except Livi, €1.725 million); Matteo Giordano, Ronny Diuk Toma, Simone Brunelli and Matteo Deinite moved to Inter (50% for €1.5 million each). Later the deal was criticized by press as it made false profit to balance sheet, as the transfer fees were paid via player exchange, but in balance sheet, the nominal value could be adjusted by two clubs. The tactics are commonly used to make the transfer fees larger in Italian football.

Ticli stayed at Monza, by then part of the province of Milan for another season. In 2004–05 season, he left on loan to Lanciano of Serie C1, then in 2005–06 season for Serie B club Catanzaro. In January 2006, he left for Pro Patria of Serie C1 on loan.

In June 2007, the co-ownership agreement ended with AC Milan fully contracted with Ticli, but then he was released.

In January 2008, he returned to Lombardy for Pavia of Serie C2 before retiring from professional football.
