= Marco Donadel =

Italian football midfielder

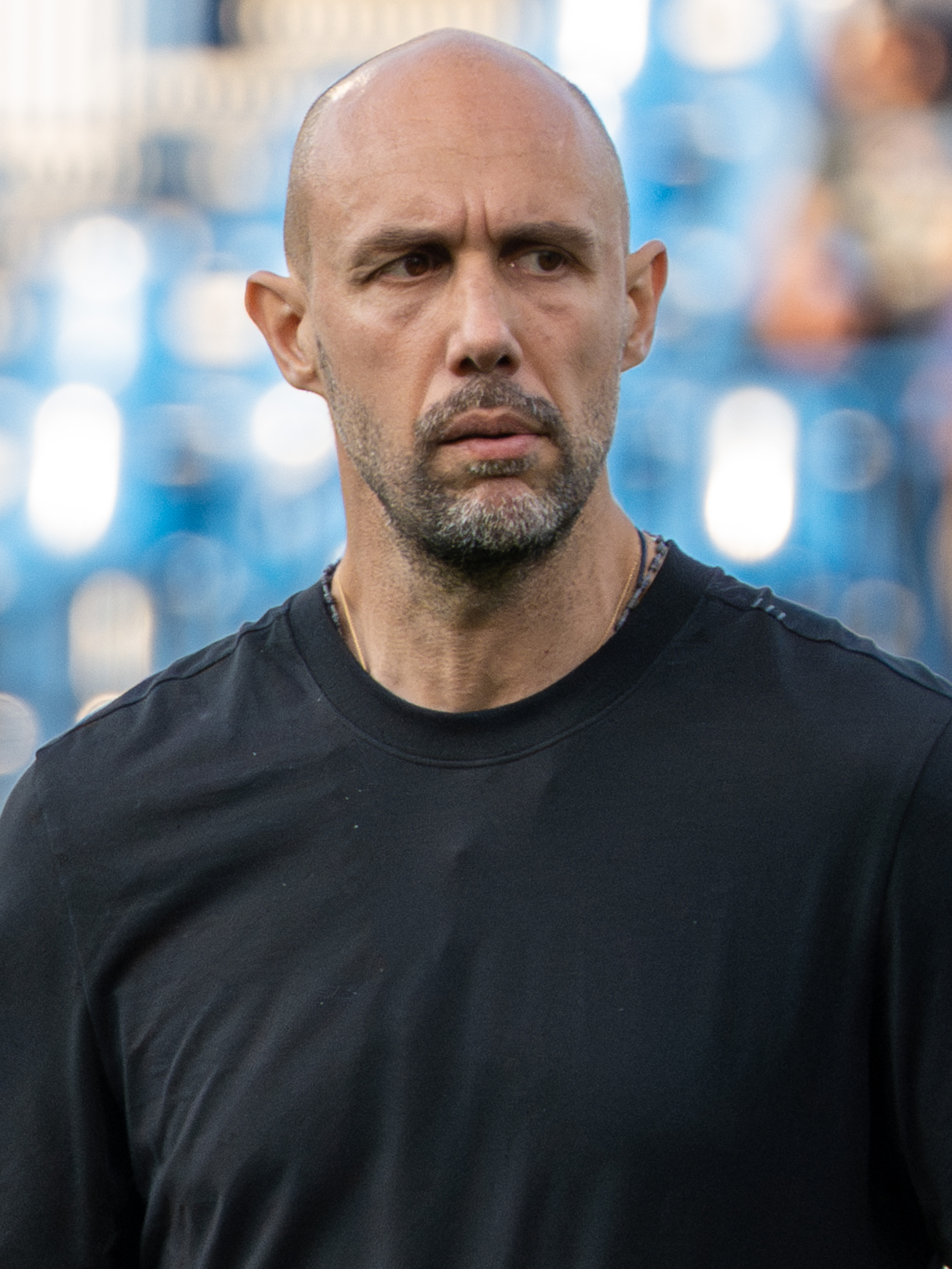
- Donadel with CF Montréal in 2025

Personal information
- Full name: Marco Donadel
- Date of birth: 21 April 1983 (age 43)
- Place of birth: Conegliano, Italy
- Height: 1.79 m (5 ft 10 in)
- Position: Midfielder

Youth career
- 1999–2001: Milan

Senior career*
Years	Team	Apps	(Gls)
2001–2003	Milan	1	(0)
2002–2003	→ Lecce (loan)	29	(0)
2003–2004	Parma	24	(0)
2004–2005	Milan	0	(0)
2004–2005	→ Sampdoria (loan)	8	(0)
2005–2011	Fiorentina	184	(4)
2011–2014	Napoli	4	(0)
2013–2014	→ Verona (loan)	23	(1)
2015–2018	Montreal Impact	67	(3)
Total		340	(8)

International career
1999	Italy U15	3	(1)
2000	Italy U16	4	(0)
2000–2001	Italy U17	9	(0)
2001	Italy U19	6	(0)
2002–2003	Italy U20	5	(1)
2004–2006	Italy U21	31	(1)

Managerial career
- 2020–2021: Fiorentina (assistant)
- 2021–2022: Spartak Moscow (assistant)
- 2023: Ancona
- 2025: CF Montréal (assistant)
- 2025–2026: CF Montréal
Medal record
Representing Italy
Men's Football
Bronze medal – third place	2004	Team competition
UEFA European Under-21 Championship
Winner	2004
- * Club domestic league appearances and goals

Marco Donadel Cavaliere OMRI (born 21 April 1983) is an Italian football coach and a former midfielder who was most recently the head coach of Major League Soccer club CF Montréal.

== Club career ==
=== Milan ===
Donadel is a youth product of Milan, playing for the youth side between 1998 and 2002, winning the Torneo di Viareggio in 1999 and 2001 before being promoted to the senior side. On 4 March 2001, he made his debut for Milan, coming on as a substitute for Andres Guglielminpietro in the 78th minute of a home Serie A game against Parma. The following season, he made his debut appearances in the UEFA Cup and Coppa Italia.

Having made just 4 appearances for the senior squad of Milan, Donadel was loaned out to Lecce in July 2002.

In June 2003 Donadel was sold to Parma in a co-ownership deal for €2 million. (with 50% rights of Roberto Massaro was purchased by Milan for €2 million) The deal made Milan making a profit of €3.897 million. In June 2004 Milan bought back 50% rights of Donadel for €800,000 in a four-year contract (Milan booked the contract value of Donadel was €4 million instead of €1.6 million, thus receiving €1.2 million financial income instead of costing Milan to write down the value of retaining 50% registration rights for €1.2 million.) In 2004–05 season Donadel was loaned to Sampdoria for free and finally Fiorentina in January 2005, for €200,000.

=== Fiorentina ===
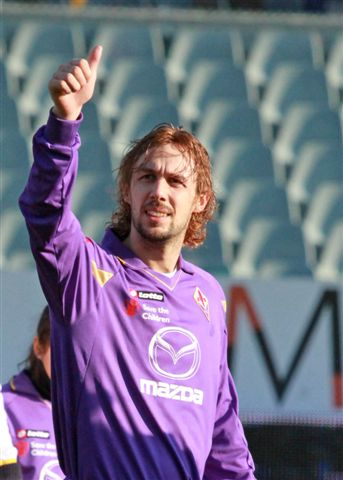
Donadel with Fiorentina in 2011

After a successful half-season-long loan with Fiorentina, he was signed permanently for €1.2 million in a four-year contract. The deal also made Milan book a €1.8 million loss. as the residual value of Donadel's contract, after amortization, was €3 million. In 2005–06, he was a regular for coach Cesare Prandelli, who had already appreciated the skills of Donadel, as they were together at Parma. In June 2007, he was offered a new contract until June 2011.

=== Napoli ===
On 24 June 2011, he signed a four-year contract with Napoli. During his stay with Napoli, he only appeared in four league matches and during the 2013–14 season, he was sent on loan to Verona, where he was a regular starter for the club.

=== Montreal Impact ===
Once his loan spell with Verona concluded, Donadel went on trial with Major League Soccer side Montreal Impact. Donadel officially signed with the Montreal Impact on 1 December 2014. His 30-yard strike in a 3–0 home win against the Columbus Crew on 11 July 2015, was voted MLS goal of the week for the 19th week of the 2015 MLS season. On 25 October, he assisted one of Drogba's goals as the Montreal Impact came from behind to defeat domestic rivals Toronto FC 2–1 at home; the win gave Montreal the home advantage for their knock-out fixture against Toronto in the 2015 MLS Cup Playoffs.

Donadel was waived by Montreal on 22 June 2018.

== International career ==
Donadel was the captain of Italy under-21 team between 2004 and 2006 and won the 2004 European Under-21 Football Championship, totalling 31 appearances and 1 goal. Donadel also won a bronze medal with Italy at the 2004 Summer Olympics football tournament.

== Coaching career ==
On 17 December 2021, Donadel was announced as the new assistant coach of Spartak Moscow, following the appointment of Paolo Vanoli as the club's new head coach.

On 11 April 2023, Donadel took on his first head coaching job in charge of Serie C club Ancona. He was dismissed on 23 October 2023 due to negative results.

Donadel returned to Montreal in December 2024, joining Laurent Courtois's staff at CF Montréal as an assistant coach. On March 24, 2025, Donadel was named interim head coach after Courtois was fired after Courtois led the team to its worst start (1 point over 5 matches) since its inaugural MLS season in 2012. On October 21, 2025, he was named as head coach on a permanent basis for the 2026 and 2027 seasons.

On April 12, 2026, Donadel was fired after a 1-6-0 start to the 2026 season.

== Career statistics ==
Appearances and goals by club, season and competition
Club	Season	League			National cup (Note: Includes Coppa Italia, Canadian Championship)		Europe		Other		Total	
Club	Season	Division	Apps	Goals	Apps	Goals	Apps	Goals	Apps	Goals	Apps	Goals
Milan	2001–02	Serie A	1	0	—		—		—		0	0
Milan	2002–03	Serie A	0	0	1	0	1 (Note: Appearances in UEFA Cup)	0	—		2	0
Milan	Total		1	0	1	0	1	0	—		3	0
Lecce (loan)	2002–03	Serie B	29	0	1	0	—		—		30	0
Parma	2003–04	Serie A	24	0	2	0	5	0	—		31	0
Sampdoria (loan)	2004–05	Serie A	8	0	0	0	—		—		8	0
Fiorentina	2004–05	Serie A	14	0	1	0	—		—		15	0
Fiorentina	2005–06	Serie A	34	1	3	1	—		—		37	2
Fiorentina	2006–07	Serie A	19	0	2	0	—		—		21	0
Fiorentina	2007–08	Serie A	31	2	3	0	10	1	—		44	3
Fiorentina	2008–09	Serie A	29	0	1	0	3 (Note: Appearances in UEFA Champions League)	0	—		33	0
Fiorentina	2009–10	Serie A	28	0	2	0	9	0	—		39	0
Fiorentina	2010–11	Serie A	29	1	2	0	—		—		31	1
Fiorentina	Total		184	4	14	1	22	1	—		220	6
Napoli	2011–12	Serie A	0	0	1	0	—		—		1	0
Napoli	2012–13	Serie A	4	0	1	0	8 (Note: Appearances in UEFA Europa League)	0	—		13	0
Napoli	Total		4	0	2	0	8	0	—		14	0
Verona	2013–14	Serie A	23	1	1	0	—		—		24	1
Montreal Impact	2015	Major League Soccer	25	1	2	0	4 (Note: Appearances in CONCACAF Champions League)	0	3 (Note: Appearances in MLS Cup playoffs)	0	34	1
Montreal Impact	2016	Major League Soccer	21	0	—		—		5 (Note: Appearances in MLS Cup playoffs)	0	26	0
Montreal Impact	2017	Major League Soccer	19	2	—		—		—		19	2
Montreal Impact	2018	Major League Soccer	2	0	—		—		—		2	0
Montreal Impact	Total		67	3	2	0	4	0	8	0	81	3
Career total			340	8	22	1	40	1	8	0	410	10

== Honours ==
=== Club ===
Napoli

- Coppa Italia: 2011–12

Montreal Impact

- CONCACAF Champions League: 2014–15 (Runner-up)

=== International ===
Italy U21

- Olympic Bronze Medal: 2004
- UEFA European Under-21 Championship: 2004

=== Orders ===
- 5th Class / Knight: Cavaliere Ordine al Merito della Repubblica Italiana: 2004
