= 2011–12 Italian football match-fixing scandal =

The 2011–12 Italian football match-fixing scandal emerged on 1 June 2011 after a number of football-related figures were arrested or placed under official scrutiny by Italian police for alleged match-fixing. The list included well-known figures like former Italian international footballer Giuseppe Signori, as well as former Serie A players Mauro Bressan, Stefano Bettarini and Cristiano Doni. The group was accused of having fixed a wide range of Serie B, Lega Pro Prima Divisione and Lega Pro Seconda Divisione games.

The inquiry started following a denunciation from Lega Pro Prima Divisione club Cremonese, instigated by internal suspicions involving first team goalkeeper Marco Paoloni, who was sold to Benevento in January 2011.

== First investigation, June 2011 ==
=== Involved figures ===
- Marco Paoloni: Benevento goalkeeper, under arrest; deemed to be a central figure in the organization, accused of having actively worked to fix games in the Lega Pro Prima Divisione league in games involving Cremonese (where he played until January 2011) and Benevento (a team he joined during the winter transfer window), including having deliberately doped his former Cremonese teammates in order to fix a game. Also accused of having collected illegal bets and organized match fixes for the whole organization.
- Giuseppe Signori: former Italian international footballer and Serie A topscorer, under house arrest; suspected of having placed illegal bets.
- Stefano Bettarini: former Italian international footballer, under investigation; suspected of being a member of the criminal match fixing organization.
- Antonio Bellavista: former Bari captain, under investigation; suspected of being a member of the criminal match fixing organization.
- Mauro Bressan: former Serie A player, under investigation; suspected of being a member of the criminal match fixing organization.
- Cristiano Doni: Atalanta captain and former Italian international footballer, under investigation; suspected of being a member of the criminal match fixing organization.
- Vittorio Micolucci: Ascoli player, under arrest; suspected of having actively worked in order to fix Serie B games for the criminal match fixing organization.
- Vincenzo Sommese: Ascoli player, under arrest; suspected of having actively worked in order to fix Serie B games for the criminal match fixing organization.
- Gianfranco Parlato: Viareggio coaching staff member and former Serie B player, under arrest; suspected of having actively worked in order to fix Lega Pro Prima Divisione games for the criminal match fixing organization.

Some of the involved persons had already been questioned or condemned for similar charges: Cristiano Doni was acquitted in 2000, whereas Vincenzo Sommese (in 2007) and Stefano Bettarini (in 2005) were each disqualified for six months due to illegal betting.

=== Potential consequences ===
Following the inquiry, media speculated about the possibility that Atalanta and Siena might lose their right to play in Serie A in 2011–12. Atalanta's situation was considered particularly delicate due to the direct involvement of Cristiano Doni in the match fixing process, whereas Siena was accused of having paid Sassuolo players in order to obtain a win by more than three goals (game ended 4–0); Sassuolo, Ascoli, Padova and Piacenza were also mentioned in the inquiry and were at risk of being punished by the Federation due to the "objective responsibility" law.

=== First-degree sentences ===
On 9 August 2011, the Italian Football Federation announced the first-degree charges for all involved parties in the scandal.

==== Clubs ====
- Atalanta B.C.: 6-point deduction in the 2011–12 season.
- Ascoli Calcio 1898: 6-point deduction in the 2011–12 season, plus €50,000 fine.
- Hellas Verona F.C.: €20,000 fine.
- U.S. Sassuolo Calcio: €20,000 fine.
- U.S. Alessandria Calcio 1912: last-placed by office in the 2010–11 season, with automatic relegation to the Lega Pro Seconda Divisione as a consequence.
- Benevento Calcio: 9-point deduction in the 2011–12 season.
- U.S. Cremonese: 6-point deduction in the 2011–12 season, plus €30,000 fine.
- F.C. Esperia Viareggio: 1-point deduction in the 2011–12 season.
- Piacenza Calcio: 4-point deduction in the 2011–12 season, plus €50,000 fine.
- Calcio Portogruaro Summaga: €20,000 fine.
- Ravenna Calcio: exclusion from the 2011–12 Lega Pro Prima Divisione with automatic relegation to Lega Pro Seconda Divisione, plus €50,000 fine.
- A.C. Reggiana 1919: 2-point deduction in the 2011–12 season.
- Spezia Calcio: 1-point deduction in the 2011–12 season.
- A.S. Taranto Calcio: 1-point deduction in the 2011–12 season.
- Virtus Entella: €15,000 fine.

==== People ====
- Antonio Bellavista: 5-year ban from football activities.
- Mauro Bressan: 3-year, 6-month ban from football activities.
- Giorgio Buffone: 5-year ban from football activities.
- Antonio Ciriello: 1-year ban from football activities.
- Daniele Deoma: 1-year, 9-month ban from football activities.
- Cristiano Doni: 3-year, 6-month ban from football activities.
- Massimo Erodiani: 5-year ban from football activities.
- Gianni Fabbri: 5-year ban from football activities.
- Steven Fenicio: given a warning.
- Carlo Gervasoni: 5-year ban from football activities.
- Thomas Manfredini: 3-year ban from football activities.
- Marco Paoloni: 5-year ban from football activities.
- Salvatore Quadrini: 1-year ban from football activities.
- Leonardo Rossi: 3-year ban from football activities.
- Nicola Santoni: 4-year ban from football activities.
- Davide Saverino: 3-year ban from football activities.
- Giuseppe Signori: 5-year ban from football activities. On 23 February 2021, Signori was acquitted due to a "lack of evidence".
- Vincenzo Sommese: 5-year ban from football activities.
- Giorgio Veltroni: 4-year ban from football activities.

=== Appeal ===
The Corte di Giustizia Federale of Italian Football Federation announced the following appeal.

- Thomas Manfredini: acquitted

=== Court of Final Appeal ===
The Tribunale Nazionale di Arbitrato per lo Sport of the Italian National Olympic Committee announced the following final appeal:

- Cristiano Doni (rejected)

== Juve Stabia – Sorrento match-fixing ==
On 11 October 2011, as part of a betting investigation, FIGC announced the ban for match-fixing of Juve Stabia – Sorrento on 5 April 2009. The case was referred to FIGC by Naples criminal court.

=== Sentences ===
==== Club ====
| Name | Sentences (CDN) | Appeal (CGF) | Final Appeal (TNAS) |
|---|---|---|---|
| S.S. Juve Stabia | 5-point deduction in the 2011–12 season. | 3-point deduction | Rejected |
| Sorrento Calcio | 2-point deduction in the 2011–12 season, plus €20,000 fine. | | |

==== People ====
| Name | Sentences (CDN) | Appeal (CGF) | Final Appeal (TNAS) |
|---|---|---|---|
| Roberto Amodio | 3-year ban from football activities | Rejected | Rejected |
| Cristian Biancone | 3-year, 6-month ban from football activities | | |
| Antonino Castellano | 1-year ban from football activities | Rejected | |
| Vitangelo Spadavecchia | 3-year, 3-month ban from football activities | Rejected | Rejected |

== Second investigation, December 2011 ==
On 19 December 2011, a new police operation coordinated by the Magistrature of Cremona led to a number of high-profile arrests, including active and former footballers such as Cristiano Doni, Luigi Sartor, Alessandro Zamperini, Nicola Santoni, Carlo Gervasoni and Filippo Carobbio. The inquiry started after Gubbio defender Simone Farina denounced a match fixing attempt from Zamperini (a former teammate of him at Roma), with a subsequent investigation leading the police to unveil a complex gambling system involving criminal figures in Singapore, Eastern Europe and Italy with interest in fixing football games all over Europe. Both investigations were initiated and helped by abnormal betting flow reports. Those reports were generated and reported to authorities by Austrian bookmaker SKS365.

The scandal then dramatically evolved a few months later: on 28 May 2012, a number of higher-profile players were involved, and the Cremone Magistrature went on to arrest Lazio vice-captain Stefano Mauri, former Genoa captain Omar Milanetto, Cristian Bertani, Paolo Acerbis, Matteo Gritti, Alessandro Pellicori, Ivan Tisci and Marco Turati, whereas José Joelson Inácio was put under house arrest and Kewullay Conteh and Francesco Ruopolo were forbidden to leave the country. More football figures were also put under investigation: among these, Juventus Serie A-winning head coach Antonio Conte (due to alleged failure to report attempted sporting fraud during his period as Siena manager), former Milan star Kakha Kaladze, Genoa striker Giuseppe Sculli (for whom the judge rejected an arrest request), Chievo striker Sergio Pellissier and Italian international Domenico Criscito who was training at Coverciano with the Azzurri team at the time, and was excluded from the UEFA Euro 2012 roster as a consequence.

Shortly after the latest arrests, Premier Mario Monti publicly suggested that football competition in the country be suspended for at least two years. He indicated that this was his personal opinion, not a formal government proposal. The manager of the Italy national team, Cesare Prandelli, said he "would have no problem" if his side were barred from Euro 2012 in the wake of the scandal.

=== Sentences ===
The National Discipline Commission (CDN) of the Italian Football Federation (FIGC) announced the first-degree charges for some involved parties in the scandal on 31 May and 18 June. On 6 July 2012 "Corte di Giustizia Federale" of FIGC announced the appeal ruling.

==== Clubs ====
- U.C. AlbinoLeffe: 15-point deduction in the 2012–13 season, plus €90,000 fine.
- A.C. Ancona: 8-point deduction in the 2012–13 season
- Atalanta B.C.: 2-point deduction in the 2012–13 season, plus €25,000 fine.
- Ascoli Calcio 1898: 1-point deduction in the 2012–13 season, plus €20,000 fine.
- U.S. Avesa (5-a-side football): 1-point deduction in the 2012–13 season, plus €200 fine.
- U.S. Cremonese: 1-point deduction in the 2012–13 season, plus €30,000 fine.
- Empoli F.C.: 1-point deduction in the 2012–13 season
- Frosinone Calcio: 1-point deduction in the 2012–13 season
- U.S. Grosseto F.C.: 6-point deduction in the 2012–13 season, plus €60,000 fine.
- A.S. Livorno Calcio: €15,000 fine.
- Modena F.C.: 2-point deduction in the 2012–13 season
- A.C. Monza Brianza 1912: 5-point deduction in the 2012–13 season
- Novara Calcio: 4-point deduction in the 2012–13 season, plus €35,000 fine.
- Calcio Padova: 2-point deduction in the 2012–13 season
- Delfino Pescara 1936: 2-point deduction in the 2012–13 season
- Piacenza F.C.: 11-point deduction in the 2012–13 season, plus €70,000 fine.
- Ravenna Calcio: 1-point deduction in the 2012–13 season
- Reggina Calcio: 4-point deduction in the 2012–13 season
- U.C. Sampdoria: €50,000 fine.
- A.C. Siena: €50,000 fine.
- Spezia Calcio: €30,000 fine.

Appeal

- U.C. AlbinoLeffe: 9-point deduction in the 2012–13 season, plus €45,000 fine.
- Empoli F.C.: 1-point deduction in the 2012–13 season.
- A.C. Monza Brianza 1912: 4-point deduction in the 2012–13 season.
- Novara Calcio: 3-point deduction in the 2012–13 season, plus €35,000 fine.
- Calcio Padova: 2-point deduction in the 2012–13 season.
- Delfino Pescara 1936: €30,000 fine.
- Reggina Calcio: 3-point deduction in the 2012–13 season.
- U.C. Sampdoria: €50,000 fine.
- A.C. Siena: €50,000 fine.
- Spezia Calcio: €30,000 fine.

==== People ====
| Name | Sentences (CDN) | Appeal (CGF) | Final Appeal (TNAS) |
|---|---|---|---|
| Andrea Alberti | 3-year, 6-month ban from football activities | Dismissed | Acquitted |
| Mirko Bellodi | 2-year ban from football activities | — (plea bargain) | |
| Davide Caremi | 3-year, 6-month ban from football activities | Dismissed | Dismissed |
| Filippo Carobbio | 1-year, 8-month ban from football activities | — (plea bargain) | |
| Mario Cassano | 5-year ban from football activities | Dismissed | Dismissed |
| Edoardo Catinali | 9-month ban from football activities | Dismissed | |
| Marco Cellini | 4-month ban from football activities | — (plea bargain) | |
| Roberto Colacone | 4-year ban from football activities | Dismissed | |
| Alberto Comazzi | 4-year ban from football activities | Dismissed | |
| Kewullay Conteh | 1-year, 8-month ban from football activities | — (plea bargain) | |
| Federico Cossato | 3-year, 6-month ban from football activities | — | |
| Filippo Cristante | 3-year ban from football activities | Dismissed | |
| Andrea De Falco | 6-month ban from football activities | — (plea bargain) | |
| Franco De Falco | 3-year, 9-month ban from football activities | 1-year ban from football activities and €30,000 fine | 1-year ban from football activities |
| Alfonso De Lucia | 5-month ban from football activities | — (plea bargain) | |
| Cristiano Doni | 2-year ban from football activities | — (plea bargain) | |
| Nicola Ferrari | 3-year ban from football activities | Dismissed | 6-month ban from football activities (immediate release) |
| Riccardo Fissore | 3-year, 9-month ban from football activities | Dismissed | 14-month ban from football activities |
| Luca Fiuzzi | 4-year ban from football activities | Dismissed | 1-year ban from football activities |
| Alberto Maria Fontana | 3-year, 6-month ban from football activities | Dismissed | Acquitted |
| Ruben Garlini | 3-year ban from football activities | Dismissed | — |
| Carlo Gervasoni | 1-year, 8-month ban from football activities | — (plea bargain) | |
| Andrea Iaconi | 3-year, 9-month ban from football activities | Dismissed | |
| Vincenzo Iacopino | 3-year, 6-month ban from football activities | Dismissed | |
| Vincenzo Italiano | 3-year ban from football activities | Dismissed | |
| Thomas Job | 3-year, 6-month ban from football activities | Dismissed | Acquitted |
| Tomas Locatelli | 2-year ban from football activities | — (plea bargain) | |
| Giuseppe Magalini | 3-year, 3-month ban from football activities | Dismissed | |
| Salvatore Mastronunzio | 4-year ban from football activities | Dismissed | 3-year ban from football activities |
| Vittorio Micolucci | 4-month ban from football activities | — (plea bargain) | |
| Nicola Mora | 4-month ban from football activities | — (plea bargain) | |
| Antonio Narciso | 1-year, 3-month ban from football activities | — (plea bargain) | |
| Maurizio Nassi | 3-year ban from football activities | Dismissed | |
| Gianluca Nicco | 3-year ban from football activities | 1-year ban from football activities and €30,000 fine | |
| Marco Paoloni | 4-year ban from football activities | — | |
| Gianfranco Parlato | 2-month ban from football activities | — (plea bargain) | |
| Dario Passoni | 1-year, 2-month ban from football activities | — (plea bargain) | |
| Alex Pederzoli | 1-year, 4-month ban from football activities and €10,000 fine | — (plea bargain) | |
| Mirco Poloni | 1-year ban from football activities | — (plea bargain) | |
| Cesare Rickler | 4-year ban from football activities | Dismissed | 14-month ban from football activities |
| Gianni Rosati | 3-year, 3-month ban from football activities | Dismissed | |
| Francesco Ruopolo | 1-year, 4-month ban from football activities | — (plea bargain) | |
| Nicola Santoni | 5-year ban from football activities | Dismissed | |
| Vincenzo Santoruvo | Disqualification for 6 match-day | — | |
| Luigi Sartor | 5-year ban from football activities | Dismissed | |
| Alessandro Sbaffo | 1-year, 4-month ban from football activities and €100,000 fine | — (plea bargain) | |
| Mattia Serafini | 3-year, 6-month ban from football activities | Dismissed | |
| Mirko Stefani | 4-year ban from football activities | Dismissed | |
| Juri Tamburini | 10-month ban from football activities | — (plea bargain) | |
| Daniele Vantaggiato | 3-year ban from football activities | Dismissed | 6-month from football activities |
| Nicola Ventola | 3-year, 6-month ban from football activities | Dismissed | |
| Alessandro Zamperini | 5-year ban from football activities | Dismissed | |

==== Sentences - September ====
On 18 June 2012, FIGC announced that the discipline action against the following players were suspended due to criminal body had started the legal process, the committee resumed the action in September.

| Name | Sentences (CDN) | Appeal (CGF) |
|---|---|---|
| Paolo Acerbis | 2-year, 6-month ban from football activities | — (plea bargain) |
| Cristian Bertani | | |
| Joelson | 2-year, 6-month ban from football activities | — (plea bargain) |
| Alessandro Pellicori | | |
| Marco Turati | | |

== Third investigation, March 2012 ==
Following intensive interrogation in March 2012, the authority of Bari and Cremona had referred several players, coaches and clubs to Italian Football Federation for disciplinary action as the third lot of operation. This included Siena coach Antonio Conte, as well as Italian internationals Leonardo Bonucci of Bari, Simone Pepe of Udinese, and Marco Di Vaio of Bologna.

On 1 August, Conte's plea bargain was rejected. On 10 August 2012 Pepe, Bonucci, Di Vaio and three other players were acquitted along with Udinese. A series of appeals from both sides was rejected by the judge; however, Grosseto and club president Piero Camilli were acquitted.

=== Sentences ===
==== Clubs – Cremona line ====
| Name | Sentences (CDN) | Appeal (CGF) |
|---|---|---|
| U.C. AlbinoLeffe | 1-point deduction in the 2012–13 season, plus €30,000 fine. | — (plea bargain) |
| A.C. Ancona (under liquidation) | €10,000 fine | — |
| U.S. Grosseto F.C. | Relegation to 2012–13 Lega Pro Prima Divisione. | acquitted |
| Novara Calcio | 2-point deduction in the 2012–13 season. | 1-point deduction in the 2012–13 season, plus €20,000 fine. |
| A.C. Siena | 6-point deduction in the 2012–13 season, plus €20,000 fine. | — (plea bargain) |
| Torino F.C. | 1-point deduction in the 2012–13 season, plus €30,000 fine. | — (plea bargain) |
| A.S. Varese 1910 | 1-point deduction in the 2012–13 season, plus €30,000 fine. | — (plea bargain) |

==== Clubs – Bari line ====
| Name | Sentences (CDN) | Appeal (CGF) | Final Appeal (TNAS) |
|---|---|---|---|
| A.S. Bari | 5-point deduction in the 2012–13 season, plus €80,000 fine. | — (plea bargain) | |
| Bologna F.C. 1909 | €30,000 fine | Rejected | |
| U.S. Lecce | Relegation to 2012–13 Lega Pro Prima Divisione, plus €30,000 fine. | Rejected | Relegation |
| Calcio Portogruaro Summaga | €5,000 fine | — (plea bargain) | |
| U.C. Sampdoria | 1-point deduction in the 2012–13 season, plus €30,000 fine. | — (plea bargain) | |
| A.C. Siena | €80,000 fine | — (plea bargain) | |

==== People – Cremona line ====
| Name | Sentences (CDN) | Appeal (CGF) | Final Appeal (TNAS) |
|---|---|---|---|
| Angelo Alessio | 8-month ban from football activities | 6-month ban from football activities | 2-month ban from football activities |
| Cristian Bertani | 3-year, 6-month ban from football activities | Rejected | 3-year ban from football activities |
| Davide Bombardini | 6-month ban from football activities | — | |
| Piero Camilli | 5-year ban from football activities | Acquitted | |
| Filippo Carobbio | 4-month ban from football activities | — (plea bargain) | |
| Mario Cassano | 9-month ban from football activities | Rejected | Rejected |
| Edoardo Catinali | 3-year, 6-month ban from football activities | Rejected | 5-month ban from football activities |
| Antonio Conte | 10-month ban from football activities | Partially acquitted, remained 10-month ban | 4-month ban from football activities |
| Ferdinando Coppola | 6-month ban from football activities | Rejected | 4-month ban from football activities |
| Angelo da Costa Júnior | 3-month ban from football activities and €30,000 fine | — (plea bargain) | |
| Giorgio D'Urbano | 5-month, 10-day ban from football activities | — (plea bargain) | |
| Davide Drascek | 3-year, 6-month ban from football activities | Rejected | 2-month ban from football activities (immediate release) |
| Daniele Faggiano | 4-month ban from football activities | — (plea bargain) | |
| Ruben Garlini | 9-month ban from football activities | — (plea bargain) | |
| Carlo Gervasoni | 3-month ban from football activities | — (plea bargain) | |
| Mavillo Gheller | 6-month ban from football activities | Rejected | acquitted |
| Marcelo Larrondo | 3-month, 20-day ban from football activities and €30,000 fine | — (plea bargain) | |
| Dario Passoni | 6-month, 15-day ban from football activities | — (plea bargain) | |
| Alessandro Pellicori | 3-year ban from football activities | Rejected | |
| Emanuele Pesoli | 3-year ban from football activities | Rejected | 10-month ban from football activities |
| Mirco Poloni | 6-month ban from football activities | — (plea bargain) | |
| Luigi Sala | 2-year ban from football activities | — (plea bargain) | |
| Marco Savorani | 5-month, 10-day ban from football activities and €30,000 fine | — (plea bargain) | |
| Cristian Stellini | 2-year ban from football activities and €50,000 fine | — (plea bargain) | |
| Claudio Terzi | 3-year, 6-month ban from football activities | Rejected | 7-month ban from football activities |
| Roberto Vitiello | 4-year ban from football activities | Rejected | 9-month ban from football activities |

==== People – Bari line ====
| Name | Sentences (CDN) | Appeal (CGF) | Final Appeal (TNAS) |
|---|---|---|---|
| Guido Angelozzi | 4-month ban from football activities | — (plea bargain) | |
| Antonio Bellavista | 4-year ban from football activities | — | |
| Nicola Belmonte | 6-month ban from football activities | Rejected | 4-month ban from football activities |
| Simone Bentivoglio | 1-year, 1-month ban from football activities and €50,000 fine | — (plea bargain) | |
| Filippo Carobbio | 2-month ban from football activities | — (plea bargain) | |
| Marco Esposito | 3-month, 10-day ban from football activities | — (plea bargain) | |
| Carlo Gervasoni | 1-month ban from football activities | — (plea bargain) | |
| Stefano Guberti | 3-year ban from football activities | Rejected | Rejected |
| Andrea Masiello | 2-year, 2-month ban from football activities and €30,000 fine | — (plea bargain) | |
| Bortolo Mutti | 4-month ban from football activities | — (plea bargain) | |
| Alessandro Parisi | 2-year ban from football activities and €10,000 fine | — (plea bargain) | |
| Daniele Portanova | 6-month ban from football activities | Rejected | 4-month ban from football activities |
| Marco Rossi | 1-year, 8-month ban from football activities and €20,000 fine | — (plea bargain) | |
| Pierandrea Semeraro | 5-year ban from football activities | Rejected | 4-year ban from football activities |
| Marcello Sanfelice | 4-month ban from football activities | — (plea bargain) | |
| Cristian Stellini | 6-month ban from football activities | — (plea bargain) | |

== See also ==
- Calcio scommesse and Totonero, for lists of other Italian match-fixing scandals
