= Bonazzi =

Bonazzi is an Italian surname. Notable people with the surname include:

- Benedetto Bonazzi (1840–1915), Italian Catholic archbishop and Hellenist
- Elaine Bonazzi (1929–2019), American operatic mezzo-soprano
- Luigi Bonazzi (1948–2025), Italian Roman Catholic apostolic nuncio
- Renzo Bonazzi (1925–2010), Italian lawyer and politician
- Roberto Bonazzi (born 1971), Italian football player and coach

== See also ==
- Banafsheh Zand-Bonazzi (born 1961), Iranian writer, film producer and human rights activist
- Bonatti, people with this Italian surname
