= 2005–06 UC AlbinoLeffe season =

U.C. AlbinoLeffe
2005–06 season
- Chairman: Gianfranco Andreoletti
- Head coach: Vincenzo Esposito; Emiliano Mondonico
- Stadium: Stadio Atleti Azzurri d'Italia
- Serie B: 18th
- Coppa Italia: Second round

The 2005–06 season was the eighth season in the existence of U.C. AlbinoLeffe and the club's third consecutive season in the second division of Italian football. In addition to the domestic league, AlbinoLeffe participated in this season's edition of the Coppa Italia.

== Competitions ==
=== Overall record ===
Competition	First match	Last match	Starting round	Final position	Record							
Competition	First match	Last match	Starting round	Final position	Pld	W	D	L	GF	GA	GD	Win %
Serie B	4 September 2005	May 2006	Matchday 1	18th	42	10	16	16	38	52	−14	23.81
Coppa Italia	7 August 2005	14 August 2005	First round	Second round	2	1	0	1	3	3	+0	50.00
Total					44	11	16	17	41	55	−14	25.00

Last updated: May 2006
Source: Competitions

=== Serie B ===
==== League table ====
Pos	Team	Pld	W	D	L	GF	GA	GD	Pts	Promotion or relegation
16	Vicenza	42	13	10	19	38	49	−11	49	
17	Rimini	42	11	15	16	42	49	−7	48	
18	AlbinoLeffe (O)	42	10	16	16	38	52	−14	46	Qualification to relegation play-offs
19	Avellino (R)	42	11	13	18	42	62	−20	46	Qualification to relegation play-offs
20	Ternana (R)	42	7	18	17	36	58	−22	39	Relegation to Serie C1

Source: Almanacco Illustrato del Calcio 2007, Panini Edizioni, Modena, November 2006
Rules for classification: 1) points; 2) head-to-head points; 3) head-to-head goal difference; 4) head-to-head goals scored; 5) goal difference; 6) number of goals scored.
(O) Play-off winners; (R) Relegated

==== Results by round ====
Round	1	2	3	4	5	6	7	8	9	10	11	12	13	14	15	16
Ground	H	A	H	A	A	H	A	H	A	H	H	A	H	A	H	A
Result	D	L	D	L	D	D	L	D	L	W	W	D	D	L	L	L
Position																

Updated to match(es) played on May 2006. Source: Serie B
A = Away; H = Home; W = Win; D = Draw; L = Loss

==== Matches ====
14 September 2005 1	AlbinoLeffe	2–2	Rimini	Bergamo
--:-- CEST (UTC+2)

4 September 2005 2	Ternana	1–0	AlbinoLeffe	Terni
--:-- CEST (UTC+2)

4 October 2005 3	AlbinoLeffe	0–0	Cremonese	Bergamo
--:-- CEST (UTC+2)

10 September 2005 4	Torino	1–0	AlbinoLeffe	Turin
--:-- CEST (UTC+2)

17 September 2005 5	Triestina	1–1	AlbinoLeffe	Trieste
--:-- CEST (UTC+2)

20 September 2005 6	AlbinoLeffe	0–0	Modena	Bergamo
--:-- CEST (UTC+2)

26 September 2005 7	Piacenza	1–0	AlbinoLeffe	Piacenza
--:-- CEST (UTC+2)

1 October 2005 8	AlbinoLeffe	2–2	Brescia	Bergamo
--:-- CEST (UTC+2)

9 October 2005 9	Atalanta	2–0	AlbinoLeffe	Bergamo
--:-- CEST (UTC+2)

15 October 2005 10	AlbinoLeffe	2–0	Avellino	Bergamo
--:-- CEST (UTC+2)

22 October 2005 11	AlbinoLeffe	2–0	Pescara	Bergamo
--:-- CEST (UTC+2)

26 October 2005 12	Hellas Verona	0–0	AlbinoLeffe	Verona
--:-- CEST (UTC+2)

29 October 2005 13	AlbinoLeffe	0–0	Catanzaro	Bergamo
--:-- CEST (UTC+2)

5 November 2005 14	Arezzo	2–0	AlbinoLeffe	Arezzo
--:-- CET (UTC+1)

13 November 2005 15	AlbinoLeffe	0–3	Cesena	Bergamo
--:-- CET (UTC+1)

18 November 2005 16	Bari	3–1	AlbinoLeffe	Bari
--:-- CET (UTC+1)

27 February 2006 30	AlbinoLeffe	2–3	Atalanta	Bergamo
--:-- CET (UTC+1)

6 May 2006 39	AlbinoLeffe	2–1	Mantova	Bergamo
--:-- CEST (UTC+2)				Stadium: Stadio Atleti Azzurri d'Italia; Attendance: 1,725

=== Coppa Italia ===
7 August 2005 First round	Pro Patria	0–1	AlbinoLeffe

13 August 2005 Second round	Manfredonia	3–2	AlbinoLeffe
