= Mattia Serafini =

Italian footballer

Personal information
- Date of birth: 4 July 1983 (age 43)
- Place of birth: Fano, Italy
- Height: 1.94 m (6 ft 4 1/2 in)
- Position: Central defender

Youth career
- ?–2001: Vis Pesaro

Senior career*
Years	Team	Apps	(Gls)
2001–2005	Vis Pesaro	40	(0)
2001–2003	→ Riccione (loan)	58	(2)
2005–2007	Ravenna	35	(0)
2007–2010	AlbinoLeffe	53	(2)
2010	→ Ravenna (loan)	6	(0)
2011	Atletico Roma	3	(0)
2011–2012	Prato	8	(0)
2012	Fano	4	(0)
- * Club domestic league appearances and goals

Mattia Serafini (born 4 July 1983) is an Italian footballer.

== Biography ==
Born in Fano, Marche, Serafini started his career at Vis Pesaro. After made his professional debut in the last league match of 2000–01 Serie C1 season, he left for Serie D side Riccione and played 2 seasons. On 1 July 2003 he returned to Vis Pesaro and played 39 Serie C1 matches. He left for Serie C1 side Ravenna in mid–2005, and entered the starting line–up in the 2nd season. In June 2007, he signed a 3-year contract with Serie B side AlbinoLeffe on free transfer. In the first 2 seasons, he wrote no.83 shirt then no.20 shirt and played an average of 20 league matches a season and mostly as starting XI. In 2009–10 season, he started 13 times in Serie B and left for his former club Ravenna in January.

In summer 2010 he returned to AlbinoLeffe but he doesn't play any games and in January 2011 he joined Atletico Roma F.C. but played only 3 games for an injury. In summer 2011 his club did not participate in any professional league and dissolves, and so Mattia joined Prato. On 30 January 2012 he was exchanged with Daniele Morante.

=== Italian football scandal ===
On 18 June 2012 Serafini was banned for 3 years and 6 months due to 2011–12 Italian football scandal.
