= Morante =

Morante is a surname. Notable people with the surname include:

- Daniele Morante (born 1979), Italian footballer
- Eduardo Morante (born 1987), Ecuadorian footballer
- Elsa Morante (1912–1985), Italian writer
- Juan Carlos Morante Buchhammer (born 1958), Peruvian Roman Catholic bishop
- Laura Morante (born 1956), Italian actress
- Massimo Morante (1950–2022), Italian musician
- Valentín Galarza Morante (1882–1951), Spanish military officer and politician
