= Nicola Santoni =

Italian footballer

Personal information
- Date of birth: 18 January 1979 (age 47)
- Place of birth: Ravenna, Italy
- Height: 1.80 m (5 ft 11 in)
- Position: Goalkeeper

Team information
- Current team: Ravenna (goalkeeping coach)

Senior career*
| Years | Team | Apps | (Gls) |
| 1998–2002 | Cesena | 32 | (0) |
| 2000–2001 | → Chieti (loan) | 34 | (0) |
| 2002–2005 | Palermo | 22 | (0) |
| 2006–2007 | Brescia | 4 | (0) |
| 2006–2007 | → Spezia (loan) | 40 | (0) |
| 2007–2008 | Spezia | 24 | (0) |
| 2008–2009 | Bari | 2 | (0) |
| Total | | 158 | (0) |
- * Club domestic league appearances and goals

Nicola Santoni (born 18 January 1979) is an Italian former professional footballer who played as a goalkeeper.

== Career ==
Santoni started his professional career at native club Cesena of Emilia-Romagna region. He was on loan to Chieti (Serie C1) in 2000–01 season.

=== Palermo ===
In 2002, he was signed by Palermo, at that time in Serie B.

He made his Serie A debut on 29 May 2005, against S.S. Lazio.

In January 2006, he was involved in David Di Michele transfer, which seen Santoni, Simone Pepe and Salvatore Masiello went to Udinese Calcio in co-ownership deal. Santoni's half was valued €1 million at that time.

But he was involved in another transfer, which Santoni transferred to Brescia and Federico Agliardi (who valued for €4 million) went to Palermo. Which means Udinese and Brescia shared the played since January 2006.

=== Spezia ===
In summer 2006, Brescia bought the rights from Udine, but he was loaned to newly promoted Serie B team Spezia.

In summer 2007, he remained in Spezia, and awarded No.1 shirt.

=== Bari ===
Santoni signed for Spezia who won the blind auction to Brescia in June 2008, but Spezia faced bankrupt. In July 2008, he signed a three-year contract with A.S. Bari. He played only twice during his time at AS Bari.

=== Retirement ===
In July 2009 Santoni agreed a loan move to his hometown club Ravenna; however, the move was later suspended after a medical revealed a heart pathology, and Santoni consequently announced his immediate retirement from football at the age of 30.

== Coaching career ==
After his retirement, Santoni was appointed to a non-playing role as coordinator of the youth goalkeeping coaches at Ravenna. In July 2010 Santoni was then named as new Ravenna goalkeeping coach, working alongside head coach Vincenzo Esposito. He was banned for four years due to 2011 Italian football scandal.

On 18 June 2012, he was banned another five years.
