= Kewullay Conteh =

Sierra Leonean footballer

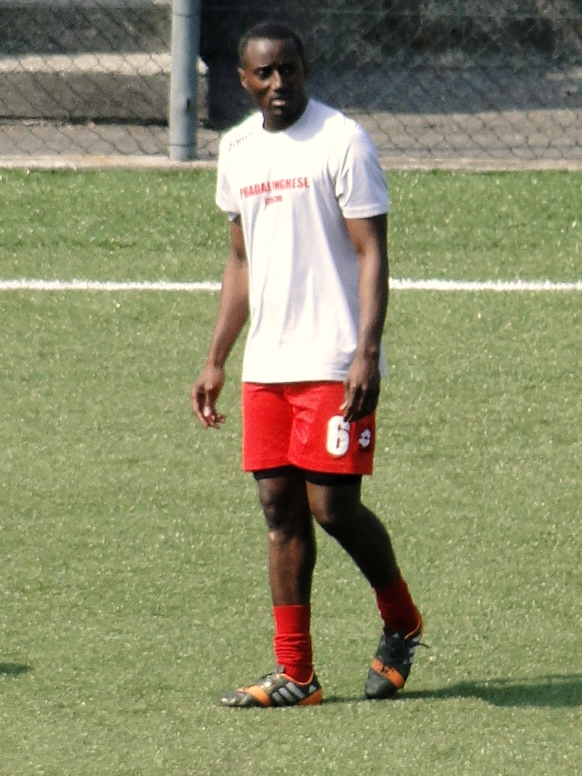

Personal information
- Date of birth: 31 December 1977 (age 48)
- Place of birth: Freetown, Sierra Leone
- Height: 1.85 m (6 ft 1 in)
- Positions: Right-back; centre-back

Youth career
- 1994–1995: Café Opera

Senior career*
Years	Team	Apps	(Gls)
1995–1997	Atalanta	2	(0)
1997–1998	Café Opera	0	(0)
1998–2000	Chievo Verona	60	(1)
2000–2002	Venezia	44	(0)
2002–2006	Palermo	69	(1)
2006–2007	Atalanta	1	(0)
2007–2009	AlbinoLeffe	56	(0)
2009–2010	Grosseto	28	(1)
2010–2011	Piacenza	25	(0)

International career
1994–2011	Sierra Leone	21	(2)
- * Club domestic league appearances and goals

Kewullay Conteh (born 31 December 1977) is a Sierra Leonean former professional footballer who played as a defender. He spent most his career in Italy while representing the Sierra Leone national team at international level.

== Career ==
Kewullay was born and raised in Fourah Bay, a neighbourhood in Freetown, Sierra Leone to Limba parents. He attended the Albert Academy Secondary school in Freetown. Conteh first moved to Italy in November 1995, joining Serie A team Atalanta from Swedish side Café Opera. He played two times for Atalanta, all in his first season with the nerazzurri, making his debut in a 1–0 loss against Fiorentina on 20 April 1996. After a short stint back to FC Café Opera, Conteh then joined Serie B side Chievo Verona in January 1998. He played three seasons for the flying donkeys, before signing for Venezia in 2000. After two seasons for Venezia, one in Serie B and one in Serie A, Conteh, together with many other team players, left Venezia for Palermo in 2002 after chairman Maurizio Zamparini bought the Sicilian team. He played for Palermo since then, initially as a regular, and later as a backbench player.

Conteh made his debut in the 2005–06 season on January, after having been ignored by coach Luigi Delneri during all his time in Palermo, and however being reconsidered by substitute Giuseppe Papadopulo, who made him play first in a UEFA Cup match played away against Slavia Prague, in which Conteh scored a goal. After a number of impressive showings, Conteh renewed his contract for Palermo, which was due in June 2006, for two more years. In August 2006 he moved on loan to Atalanta, but failed to break into the starting lineup in the 2006–07 season. In August 2007, he rescinded his contract with Palermo and joined Serie B side AlbinoLeffe in a free transfer, signing a one-year-long contract with the seriani. He left AlbinoLeffe in June 2008, as he initially failed to agree for a new contract, but re-joined the team on September as a free agent.

He was also a regular for the Sierra Leone national team.

In December 2011, Conteh was confirmed to be under investigation from the Magistrature of Cremona for briberies related to the 2011 Italian football scandal, being accused to have agreed to fix a number of Serie B football games while at AlbinoLeffe together with teammates Filippo Carobbio, Paolo Acerbis and Joelson.
