= Enrico Preziosi =

Italian entrepreneur (born 1948)

- Born: 18 February 1948 (age 77); Avellino, Italy
- Occupation: entrepreneur
- Known for: Giochi Preziosi (owner); Fingiochi (main shareholder)
- Board member of: Giochi Preziosi (chairman); Genoa (chairman)

Enrico Preziosi is an Italian entrepreneur. He runs a number of businesses and is most famous for having been the chairman (Italian: presidente) of football club Genoa.

== Toys ==
Preziosi is the chairman (Italian: presidente) of the board of directors of Giochi Preziosi, a toy company. He was the major shareholder through Fingiochi. The group is the leader in Italy's toy industry, which acquired other toy companies such as Migliorati, Ceppi Ratti and GiG. In the 2008–09 fiscal year, the group turnover was €865.3 million, with a net profit of €3.2 million. On 30 June 2009, the group had €428 million net assets.

== Football ==
=== Como ===
Preziosi was the chairman of Como from 26 February 1998 until 18 October 2003. The team promoted to Serie A in 2002 as Serie B champion. Como received capital injection of 4,165,810,500 lire (€2,151,461) on 31 May 1999, and again in the next few seasons in order to promote to Serie A. Preziosi also made one of his first successful player deals, such as Tommaso Rocchi. However, the team relegated a year later and filed for bankruptcy in 2005. In 2009, he was banned from football for four months and fined €100,000 for wrongdoing when in charge of Como.

The liquidator of Como sued Juventus in 2006 for unpaid transfer fee of Alex Pederzoli and Felice Piccolo, who went back to Juventus in 2004. However, Juventus claimed it had paid and sued Preziosi instead. It was settled in February 2011 after Juventus agreed to pay €0.2 million instead of alleged €1.58 million. Como acquired Pederzoli and Piccolo for €1.6 million and returned to Juventus for €20,000. FIGC suspected Juventus, which signed youth players Domenico Criscito and Francesco Volpe from Genoa in co-ownership deals for €1.9 million in 2004 (Antonio Nocerino moved to opposite direction for €0.45M, i.e., €1.45million cash involved), were actually flopped in order to transfer the sum of €1.58million to Genoa, the new club of Preziosi. Genoa also sold Alessandro Colasante to Como in January 2004 for €750,000 but he joined Genoa as a free agent. Daniele Gregori, sold to Genoa in 2003 for free, also returned to Como in January 2004 for €750,000. Genoa also signed Carlo Gervasoni from Como in 2004 for free, but was sold to Verona for €500,000.

Despite Preziosi selling Como, on 15 June 2005, Preziosi regained his influence on Como after it was acquired by Royal S.r.l. This violated the rule stating that a person cannot have majority interests for more than two clubs. Como was not admitted to 2005–06 Serie C2, partially due to that reason (despite the club's financial issues partially being solved), and the club was sold to 1907 Como S.r.i., a company not owned by Preziosi. Como was not admitted to Serie C2 under new management because, by then, it was too late.

=== Genoa ===
Preziosi acquired Genoa in June 2003 from the liquidator of Genoa's parent company. In October, Como was sold to Aleandro Dall'Oglio. The team remained at Serie B due to Caso Catania. He also bought players from Como to Genoa, such as Saša Bjelanović, Stephen Makinwa, Giuseppe Greco, Marco Rossi, Luca Belingheri and Nikola Lazetić.

==== Caso Genoa–Venezia ====
In the next season, the team acquired Argentine striker Diego Milito, who scored 21 goals, winning the 2005 Serie B championship (cadetto) and promoted. Due to Genoa having manipulated the result of the last match, Genoa 3–2 Venezia (Caso Genoa), the team was relegated to Serie C1 and Preziosi was banned from football for five years by Lega Calcio. His appeal was also dismissed by internal committee of FIGC on 6 August and by the civil court in the same month. He submitted an appeal to La Camera di Conciliazione e Arbitrato per lo Sport section of Italian National Olympic Committee (CONI) and intervening settled on 18 January 2006. The agreement was not published but it was aimed for Genoa's future in exchange Preziosi giving up something (that season, Genoa's penalty was fixed at 3 points plus a match result annulled due to Antonio Ghomsi's case). Despite the charges being lifted by the Court of Cassation and the case returned to a lower court, the Italian Appellate court convicted Preziosi of fraud and gave him a four-month sentence. In July 2012, it was confirmed that, rather than receive a jail sentence, Preziosi was forbidden to enter the stadium for six months, so he arranged for a life-size photo of himself to be placed in his seat. He was also banned by Serie C for a year on 14 December 2005, for violating article 11 bis of Codice di Giustizia Sportiva. However it was annulled after an appeal.

==== Caso Como–Genoa ====
In June 2007, Presiozi was banned for another five years by Lega Calcio for the abnormal transaction between Genoa and Como. It once lifted on 20 June, but upheld by the national discipline committee (Commissione disciplinare nazionale, CDN) of FIGC on 15 May 2008. He also appealed to La Camera di Conciliazione e Arbitrato per lo Sport section of CONI on 14 July 2008. A hearing was held on 18 February 2009 (initially on 24 September 2008) and the case ended on 13 September 2010 with an unannounced result. On 3 October 2008, his lawyer submitted a request to probationally imprison him for 23 months to end the case before went to the formal judicial process in the court of Como.

==== Bilanciopoli ====
Preziosi was involved in the 2000s false accounting scandal (Bilanciopoli), which clubs manipulated the price of footballers and other false account tricks in order to pass the financial tests. Preziosi was banned for four months and fined €15,000. It was accused that Genoa and Udinese had inflated the price in the transfer of Rodrigue Boisfer and Valon Behrami to Udine and Mohammed Gargo and Vittorio Micolucci to Genoa in exchange in January 2004. In reality, Boisfer stated that Genoa registered a profit in the 2003–04 financial year, he costed Genoa for over €4 million spread over six years and overweighed the profit in the 2003–04 season. He spent over 5.5 season on loan to other clubs in order to slowly amortize his over €4 million price tag.

==== Market operation and caso Milito–Motta ====
In Preziosi era, the team known for buy-low, sell-high technique, including selling Diego Milito and Thiago Motta (who was a free agent in 2008) to Internazionale in 2009 for €38.2 million, in exchange for Riccardo Meggiorini (€5 million), Robert Acquafresca (€9.5 million), Leonardo Bonucci (€3 million) and Francesco Bolzoni (€3M) Moreover, Ivan Fatić was sold back to Chievo for undisclosed fee and sold to Genoa in co-ownership deal for €200,000. (Bonucci and Meggiorini were immediately sold to Bari for €4.5 million, instantly gained €1 million in accounting (9 million minus 8). A year later Bonucci sold to Juventus for €15.5 million (gained €6 million for Genoa's portion) and Meggiorini to Bologna in co-ownership deal for €3M.) It is believed that Preziosi involved in that transaction and contacted directly with Massimo Moratti. Which, Turin-based newspaper Tuttosport reported that Inter risked a sanction due to Preziosi in fact still banned from football, and the transfer may be void (eventually not happened). On 9 July FIGC announced that Preziosi was banned for 6 months. He appealed to National Arbitration Tribunal of Sport (Tribunale Nazionale di Arbitrato per lo Sport), A hearing was scheduled on 12 November (which was moved from 19 October) but gave up after the hearing on 10 December 2010.

The team also acquired Marco Borriello from Milan in 2007 in co-ownership deal, who just valued €1.8 million, as he was suspended in the 2006–07 season due to using banned substances. A year later, Milan bought back Borriello for €10 million (€7.5 million plus half of Davide Di Gennaro). That season, Genoa also sold Cesare Bovo back to Palermo for €5 million who arrived at "The Griffin" for €2.85 million. Genoa also bought back Criscito in 2009 (in co-ownership) and in full in 2010, which cost Genoa just €5.5M and €6M (Criscito re-joined Genoa on loan for €1M in 2008 by exchanging Bonucci's 50% rights, valued at €8M)). Juventus acquired Criscito at youth for €950,000 in 2004 (co-ownership) and another 50% in 2007 for €7.5M (€5.25M cash plus Konko and A.Masiello). While Konko himself was sold for €9 million. Criscito was sold to Russia in the summer of 2011.

As part of the Bovo deal, Genoa signed Giuseppe Biava for €500,000. Despite being aged 33 in 2010, he was sold to Lazio for €800,000, nearly a double. His defensive partner in the 2008–09 season, Matteo Ferrari, was allowed to leave for Beşiktaş for €4.5 million in 2009, a year before he was a free agent.

The team also sold Sergio Floccari for €8.5 million plus a €0.5 million loan fee, who joined Genoa for €9.1M, and Giuseppe Sculli (who joined Genoa for €300,000) to Lazio on 21 June 2010 and in January 2011. The former had a disappointing 2009–10 season and Genoa made a quick swap in mid-season, which saw David Suazo from Inter to Genoa and Floccari to Lazio to replace Inter bounded Goran Pandev. Genoa also made another three-way swap, in which Acquafresca returned from Atalanta, Atalanta signed Nicola Amoruso from Parma, and Parma signed Hernán Crespo from Genoa.

Genoa once contracted five of the 23-player squad at the 2009 UEFA European Under-21 Football Championship, namely Acquafresca, Criscito, Ranocchia, Salvatore Bocchetti and Alberto Paloschi (in the 2010–11 season), the first four of them contracted at the same time in the 2009–10 season, plus half-owned Italy internationals Bonucci (who travelled to the 2010 FIFA World Cup in South Africa), Genoa owned most of the talented defenders (centre-back) of 1986 and 1987 at that time (Ranocchia was born in 1988). The only centre-back in the 2009 U-21 Euro not owned by Genoa was Marco Andreolli.

The team members were shaky compared to the traditional bigger team. For example, Genoa had changed its goalkeeper from Rubinho to Marco Amelia, Eduardo and Sebastien Frey in the 2011–12 season. The longest serving keeper in recent years is Alessio Scarpi, a backup keeper. In the meantime, Luca Toni, a regular starter in the 2010–11 season, and sub Gergely Rudolf were released (to Juventus) and loaned out in January 2011 respectively. In exchange, Antonio Floro Flores and Mauro Boselli were borrowed. When a player was sold, the team would look for a replacement. Despite the sales of Bocchetti and Papastathopoulos in 2010–11 season, Dario Dainelli and Kaladze replaced them. The team concerned lesser goals and also scored lesser goals compared to those in the 2009–10 season. No Genoa player scored more than 10 goals since the departure of Milito. Only Floro Flores was able to score 10 goals for Genoa in the half-season.

==== Other ban and fine ====
Preziosi was also banned for two months in July 2008 due to the sale of Domenico Criscito to Juventus, and the acquisition of Abdoulay Konko and Andrea Masiello in January 2007.

Preziosi was banned for ten days as he contacted Siena for Erjon Bogdani's price. He was also banned for another 10 days in November 2008 as he entered the field in the last match of 2007–08 Serie A. Later, he was banned for 20 days during the event on 21 October 2007 (against Juventus) and on 26 October 2008 (for entering the locker room during the match against Inter). Preziosi was fined €100,000 for transfer irregularity in May 2012.
