= Agliardi =

Agliardi [aʎˈʎardi] is a surname of Italian origin. People with this surname include:

- Antonio Agliardi (1832–1915), Italian cardinal, archbishop, and papal diplomat
- Federico Agliardi (born 1983), Italian footballer
