= Amodio =

Amodio may refer to:

- Amedeo Amodio, Italian choreographer
- Florent Amodio, French figure skater
- Héctor Amodio, Uruguayan guerrilla fighter
- Matt Amodio, Jeopardy! player
- Nicolás Amodio, Uruguayan footballer
- Paolo Amodio, Luxembourgish footballer
- Roberto Amodio, Italian Director of football and former footballer
- Nick Amodio, Famous non-binary American Pool Player
