= Davide Caremi =

Italian footballer (born 1984)

Personal information
- Date of birth: 5 May 1984 (age 42)
- Place of birth: Como, Italy
- Height: 1.80 m (5 ft 11 in)
- Position: Midfielder

Youth career
- Como

Senior career*
Years	Team	Apps	(Gls)
2003–2004	Como	24	(0)
2004–2006	Pescara	1	(0)
2005	→ Novara (loan)	11	(0)
2005–2006	→ Lanciano (loan)	32	(1)
2006–2009	AlbinoLeffe	40	(2)
2007–2008	→ Ancona (loan)	31	(1)
2009–2011	Frosinone	13	(0)
2011	Andria	2	(0)
Total		154	(4)

International career
2004	Italy U20	1	(0)
- * Club domestic league appearances and goals

Davide Caremi (born 5 May 1984) is an Italian footballer who plays as a midfielder. From 2003 to 2011 he had played 78 Serie B games; between January and June 2005, 2005–06, 2007–08 and 2011–12 Caremi also played 76 times in Serie C1.

On 18 June 2012 he was banned from all football activity for 3 years and 6 months due to involvement in the 2011–12 Italian football scandal.

== Career ==
=== Como ===
Born in Como, Lombardy, Caremi started his career at hometown club Calcio Como SpA. He made Serie B debut on 16 November 2003 against Atalanta. The club relegated at the end of season, which Caremi formed an agreement with the club regarding wages, however it became a controversy few years later, as the agreement made Como eligible to 2004–05 Serie C1 by a "healthier" financial status. Como relegated again in June 2005 and was declared bankrupted on 22 December 2004.

=== Pescara ===
In 2004 Caremi was signed by Chievo but farmed to Serie B club Pescara on 31 August 2004 in co-ownership deal for €500. In January 2005 he left for Serie C1 club Novara. In June 2005 Chievo gave up the remain 50% registration rights to Pescara for free. In 2005 Caremi left for another third division club S.S. Lanciano. Caremi was included in 2005 pre-season camp of Pescara.

=== AlbinoLeffe ===
In 2006 Chievo re-signed Caremi for €100,000. He was immediately left for AlbinoLeffe in another co-ownership deal for €70,000 in 3-year deal. Caremi only played 13 times in 2006–07 Serie B. In June 2007 the co-ownership was renewed. On 1 August 2007 he was signed by Ancona. In June 2008 Chievo gave up the 50% registration rights again for free.

=== Frosinone ===
On 9 July 2009 Caremi was signed by Frosinone in 2-year deal.

=== Andria ===
On 15 July 2011 Caremi joined Andria. He was released on 28 October.

=== Italian football scandal ===
Caremi was interrogated by a procurator on 7 March 2012. On 18 June 2012 FIGC announced that Caremi was responsible in 2011–12 Italian football scandal, which he would banned from all football activities for 3 1/2 years. He appealed to FIGC's Corte di Giustizia Federale, and later CONI's Tribunale Nazionale di Arbitrato per lo Sport, however both appeal were dismissed.
