= Poloni (surname) =

Poloni is an Italian surname. Notable people with the surname include:

- Derick Poloni (born 1993), Brazilian professional footballer
- John Poloni (born 1954), American Major League Baseball pitcher
- Vincenza Maria Poloni (1802–1855), Italian religious sister
- Mirco Poloni (born 1974), Italian association footballer

== See also ==
- Polonia (disambiguation)
