= Dario Passoni =

Italian footballer (born 1974)

Personal information
- Date of birth: 9 February 1974 (age 52)
- Place of birth: Cassano d'Adda, Italy
- Height: 1.82 m (5 ft 11 1/2 in)
- Position: Midfielder

Senior career*
Years	Team	Apps	(Gls)
1993–1995	Casarano	54	(5)
1995–1996	Fidelis Andria	33	(3)
1996–1997	Venezia	10	(0)
1996–2003	Chievo	112	(5)
2001–2002	→ Siena (loan)	31	(2)
2003	Uralan Elista	28	(3)
2003–2007	Livorno	109	(1)
2007–2009	Mantova	46	(1)
2009	→ Piacenza (loan)	17	(2)
2009–2011	AlbinoLeffe	53	(0)
- * Club domestic league appearances and goals

Dario Passoni (born 9 February 1974) is an Italian former football midfielder.

Passoni was sold to Mantova for €800,000 in 2007.

On 31 August 2009, he was signed by Serie B outfit AlbinoLeffe for €250,000. At the same time, Carlo Gervasoni moved to Mantova also for €250,000.

Passoni was involved in the 2011–12 Italian football match-fixing scandal and was banned from any soccer-related activities for fourteen months.

In July 2012, several players, including Passoni, were charged with sports fraud.
