= Juri Tamburini =

Italian footballer

Personal information
- Date of birth: 7 July 1977 (age 49)
- Place of birth: Cattolica, Italy
- Height: 1.80 m (5 ft 11 in)
- Position: Left back

Youth career
- –1996: Cesena

Senior career*
Years	Team	Apps	(Gls)
1995–1999	Cesena	47	(1)
1996–1997	→ Chieti (loan)	29	(3)
1999–2004	Vicenza	93	(7)
2000–2002	→ Salernitana (loan)	63	(0)
2004–2011	Modena	234	(14)
2011–2012	Ascoli	9	(1)
2012	Pergocrema	12	(1)
- * Club domestic league appearances and goals

Juri Tamburini (born 7 July 1977) is an Italian footballer who played for many years in Serie B.

== Biography ==
Born in Cattolica, the Province of Rimini, Romagna, Tamburini started his career at Romagna team Cesena. He played for Cesena in 1995–96 Anglo-Italian Cup. He left for Chieti and played 29 games in 1996–97 Serie C2.

In 1999 Tamburini left for Vicenza. He left for Salernitana in temporary deal after Vicenza promoted back to 2000–01 Serie A. Despite Vicenza relegated for just 1 season, his loan was renewed.

In 2004 Tamburini left for Modena. Tamburini played for the club for 7 seasons. In 2011 Tamburini was signed by Ascoli Calcio 1898.

In January 2012 Tamburini was transferred to Pergocrema.

=== Italian football scandal ===
In May 2012, Modena received two penalty points as several players, including Tamburini, had been accused of match fixing.

On 31 May 2012 he was banned 10 months due to involvement in 2011–12 Italian football scandal (formal announcement on 18 June). Gianni Rosati, sports director of Reggina, had asked Tamburini to make contact with Antonio Narciso (by then Grosseto player, former Modena team-mate) in order to alter the match Reggina–Grosseto. The round 40 match Reggina 1–0 won and ultimately Reggina qualified to promotion playoffs as the 6th place (last berth).
