= Daniele Gregori =

Italian footballer (born 1977)

Personal information
- Date of birth: 18 February 1977 (age 49)
- Place of birth: Foligno, Italy
- Height: 1.84 m (6 ft 0 in)
- Position: Defender

Team information
- Current team: Milan (U19 assistant coach)

Senior career*
Years	Team	Apps	(Gls)
1996–1999	L'Aquila	26	(0)
1997–1998	→ Sambenedettese (loan)	30	(2)
1998–1999	→ Sambenedettese (loan)	23	(0)
1999–2002	Pescara	35	(1)
1999–2000	→ Sambenedettese (loan)	23	(0)
2001–2003	Como	47	(0)
2003–2004	Genoa	8	(0)
2004	Como	16	(0)
2004–2005	Salernitana	5	(0)
2005	Venezia	2	(0)
2005–2008	Pro Sesto	75	(2)
2008	Benevento	1	(0)
2009–2011	Foligno	52	(2)
2011	Angelana		
2012	Todi		

Managerial career
- 2013–2015: Gualdo (assistant)
- 2015: Foligno (assistant)
- 2016–2017: Maceratese (assistant)
- 2017: Perugia (technical coach)
- 2018–: Milan (U19 assistant)
- * Club domestic league appearances and goals

Daniele Gregori (born 18 February 1977) is an Italian professional football coach and a former player. He is an assistant coach with the Under-19 squad of Milan.

He played 14 games in the Serie A in the 2002–03 season for Calcio Como.

In July 2003, after Enrico Preziosi acquired Genoa, he was sold to the club for free but in January 2004 returned to Como for 750,000. In 2008 Preziosi was found guilty and his football ban was upheld.
