= Pedro Kamata =

Footballer (born 1981)

Personal information
- Date of birth: 6 September 1981 (age 45)
- Place of birth: Luanda, Angola
- Height: 1.67 m (5 ft 6 in)
- Position: Winger

Youth career
- 1997–2002: Auxerre

Senior career*
Years	Team	Apps	(Gls)
2002	Groningen	1	(0)
2003	Clermont	17	(2)
2003	Châteauroux	13	(1)
2004	Clermont	10	(1)
2004–2005	Châteauroux	30	(3)
2005–2007	Legnano	82	(5)
2008–2010	Bari	60	(1)
2010–2011	Siena	15	(0)
2011–2012	Yzeure	23	(3)
2012–2015	Moulins	72	(3)
Total		323	(19)

International career
2001	France U20	1	(0)
2010	DR Congo	1	(0)
- * Club domestic league appearances and goals

Pedro Kamata (born 6 September 1981) is a former professional footballer who played as a winger. Born in Angola, he represented France at youth level before making his DR Congo national team debut in 2010.

== Club career ==
Kamata was born in Luanda, Angola. He started his career at Auxerre. He then joined FC Groningen in the summer of 2002, only to return to Ligue 2 in order to join Clermont Foot in January 2003. He then kept playing in Ligue 2 until he was signed by Legnano of Serie C2 in 2005. He helped the club to win promotion to Serie C1 in the summer of 2007. During the 2007–08 Serie C1 season, he was signed by Bari of Serie B, and went on to make his debut at Serie A level in 2009.

In 2010, he was sold to A.C. Siena in co-ownership deal for €500,000. Siena also signed Filippo Carobbio for €500,000. The deals was part of Abdelkader Ghezzal's transfer to Bari.

In June 2011 Siena and Bari made a pure player swap, which Carobbio, Kamata and Nicola Belmonte joined Siena outright, and Ghezzal joined Bari outright.

In August 2011 he mutually terminated the contract with Siena. He joined AS Yzeure in September 2011

== International career ==
Between 1996 and 2000, he played 29 matches and scored 6 goals for France U16, U17, U18 and U19 teams.

In 2001, he played one game for the France national under-20 team in a friendly match against Finland.

In 2004, he was named in DR Congo squad for 2006 FIFA World Cup qualification. But at that time he was too old to switch nationality. Instead, Makiadi Kamata played his first and last match for DR Congo, which there is unknown connection with the two "Kamata".

In 2006, he was named by Angola coach Luís Gonçalves for the 2006 Africa Cup of Nations held in Egypt, but was unable to obtain the necessary clearance from FIFA for a switch in national allegiance.

However, in 2010, he was able to play for DR Congo in a friendly match against Saudi Arabia. It is because FIFA abolished the age limit of age 21 for nationality switch for multi-nationality holders in 2009.
