= Marco Mallus =

Italian footballer

Personal information
- Date of birth: 24 January 1982 (age 44)
- Place of birth: Como, Italy
- Height: 1.80 m (5 ft 11 in)
- Position: Centre-back

Team information
- Current team: AS Ciabbino

Youth career
- Como

Senior career*
Years	Team	Apps	(Gls)
2000–2001	Como	0	(0)
2000–2001	→ Legnano (loan)	13	(0)
2001–2005	South Tyrol	98	(1)
2005–2007	Treviso	13	(0)
2007–2010	Reggiana	38	(0)
2009	→ Viareggio (loan)	7	(0)
2010–2011	Mezzocorona	28	(1)
2011–2012	Gozzano	21	(0)
2012–2013	Civitanovese	24	(0)
2013–2016	Ancona	48	(1)
2016–2017	Viterbese	8	(0)
2017	L'Aquila	3	(0)
2017	ASD Monticelli	5	(0)
2017–	AS Ciabbino	0	(0)
- * Club domestic league appearances and goals

Marco Mallus (born 24 January 1982) is an Italian footballer who plays as a defender for Italian club AS Ciabbino.

== Career ==
Mallus started his career at hometown club Como. After a loan spell with Legnano of Serie C2, he joined South Tyrol of the same division in co-ownership deal in June 2001, for 1 million lire (€516). That season South Tyrol also signed Carlo Gervasoni and sold Luigi Crisopulli back to Como. In June 2004 Como gave up the remain 50% registration rights of Mallus for free and bought back Gervasoni for €120,000.

In 2005 Treviso signed him in another co-ownership deal. Although he just played twice at Serie A, Treviso bought all remain registration rights. After just played 13 league matches in 2 seasons, he left for Reggiana in another co-ownership deal, for a peppercorn of €500. He played 21 league matches in the first season and Reggiana choose to bought the remain rights. In the second season he just played 8 league matches before left for Viareggio of 2008–09 Lega Pro Seconda Divisione.

Since 2011 Mallus played for Serie D clubs, such as Gozzano, Civitanovese and most recently Ancona.
