= Davide Drascek =

Italian footballer (born 1981)

Personal information
- Full name: Davide Drascek
- Date of birth: 23 April 1981 (age 45)
- Place of birth: Monfalcone, Italy
- Height: 1.82 m (6 ft 0 in)
- Position: Midfielder

Senior career*
Years	Team	Apps	(Gls)
1999–2000	Vicenza	0	(0)
2000–2001	Fiorenzuola	32	(0)
2001–2002	Mantova	15	(0)
2002–2003	L'Aquila	19	(1)
2003–2004	Giulianova	27	(0)
2004–2006	Vicenza	44	(0)
2006–2007	Cisco Roma	51	(3)
2008–2009	Venezia	42	(3)
2009–2010	Itala San Marco	12	(1)
2010–2011	Novara	24	(0)
2011–2012	FeralpiSalò	24	(1)
- * Club domestic league appearances and goals

Davide Drascek (born 23 April 1981) is an Italian footballer who plays as a midfielder.

Drascek was signed by FeralpiSalò on 20 October 2011.

On 11 August 2012 he was suspended for 3 1/2 years due to 2011 Italian football scandal.
