= Mavillo Gheller =

Italian footballer

Personal information
- Date of birth: 3 August 1975 (age 51)
- Place of birth: Busto Arsizio, Italy
- Height: 1.81 m (5 ft 11 1/2 in)
- Position: Right-back

Senior career*
Years	Team	Apps	(Gls)
1993–2001	Varese	165	(6)
1995–1996	→ Monza (loan)	24	(0)
1996–1997	→ Novara (loan)	18	(1)
2001–2004	Pavia	81	(6)
2004–2005	Treviso	26	(1)
2005–2007	Pistoiese	62	(5)
2007–2011	Novara	91	(2)
2011–2012	Pavia	18	(0)
2012–2013	Trento		
2015–2016	Varese		
2016–2017	Busto 81		

Managerial career
- 2017: Busto 81 (youth)
- 2019–2020: Novara (youth)
- 2020: Novara (assistant)
- 2020–2021: Novara (assistant)
- * Club domestic league appearances and goals

Mavillo Gheller (born 3 August 1975) is an Italian football coach and a former player.

Gheller spent his entire career in Italian lower division (form the second to the fifth division), especially in Prima Divisione (over 300 games).

== Biography ==
Born in Busto Arsizio, the Province of Varese, Gheller started his career at hometown club Varese, followed the club promoted to Serie C2 in 1994 and Serie C1 in 1998.

In 2001, he left for Serie C2 team Pavia, winning the Group A of 2002–03 Serie C2. In 2004, he was signed by Serie B team Treviso. Despite the team losing the promotion playoffs of 2004–05 Serie B, the team promoted due to Caso Genoa in August. But Gheller already ruled out from Treviso provisional 2005–06 Serie B plan, and in June left for Serie C1 club Pistoiese.

In 2007, he was signed by fellow Serie C1 team Novara. He followed the team promoted successively promoted twice in 2010 and 2011, from Prima Divisione (ex- Serie C1) to Serie A. However, in its first and last Serie B season (and Novara also) he only made 10 starts. In the promotion playoffs the right backs were Michel Morganella and youngster Jean-Christophe Coubronne, which Gheller made his only appearance to replace the latter.

On 14 July 2011 his contract was mutually terminated in order to join A.C. Pavia. He was involved in 2011–12 Italian football scandal which FIGC alleged him has responsibility by failing to report organized match-fixing. on 30 August 2012 his contract was terminated.

On 22 October he was acquitted any charge in front of TNAS of CONI (Italian Olympic Committee).

== Honours ==
Supercup

- Supercoppa di Lega di Prima Divisione: 2010 (Novara)

League

- Lega Pro Prima Divisione: 2010 (Novara)
- Lega Pro Seconda Divisione: 1998 (Varese), 2003 (Pavia)
- Serie D: 1994 (Varese)

Cup

- Coppa Italia Lega Pro: 1995 (Varese)
