= Antonio Narciso =

Italian footballer (born 1980)

Personal information
- Date of birth: 1 October 1980 (age 46)
- Place of birth: Trani, Italy
- Height: 1.85 m (6 ft 1 in)
- Position: Goalkeeper

Senior career*
Years	Team	Apps	(Gls)
1996–1997	Trani	13	(0)
1997–2002	Bari	6	(0)
2001	→ Triestina (loan)	0	(0)
2002	→ Gubbio (loan)	2	(0)
2003–2005	Martina	66	(0)
2005–2010	Modena	48	(0)
2008–2009	→ AlbinoLeffe (loan)	29	(0)
2010–2012	Grosseto	73	(0)
2013–2018	Foggia	94	(0)
2016–2017	→ Gubbio (loan)	14	(0)
2017	→ Teramo (loan)	18	(0)
2017–2018	→ Sicula Leonzio (loan)	36	(0)
2018–2019	Sicula Leonzio	16	(0)
2019–2023	Modena	8	(0)
- * Club domestic league appearances and goals

Antonio Narciso (born 1 October 1980) is an Italian former professional footballer who played as a goalkeeper.

== Career ==
After spending his early career as a backup keeper for Bari, with whom he made his Serie A debut on 22 April 2011 against Bologna, and successively as a regular for a number of minor league teams, Narciso joined Modena in 2005 as Giorgio Frezzolini's backup. He then moved on loan to AlbinoLeffe in 2008 to replace Federico Marchetti, who was loaned to Cagliari, then becoming a first choice for the club.

During the 2010 summer transfer market window he moved to Grosseto.

Narciso was involved in the 2011–12 Italian football match-fixing scandal. On 16 February 2012 he was investigated by the Cremona prosecutor, while on 9 May 2012 he was referred to the Italian Football Federation prosecutor. On 31 May 2012, his plea deal was accepted and he was banned for 1 year and 3 months.

On 3 September 2013, Narciso joined Foggia on a free transfer.

After playing for Sicula Leonzio in Serie C on loan in the 2017–18 season, he rejoined the club on a permanent basis on 18 July 2018 on a one-year deal.

For the 2019–20 season, he returned to Modena.

== Honours ==
=== Club ===
Calcio Foggia

- Coppa Italia Serie C: 2015–16
