= Antonio Bellavista =

Italian footballer (born 1977)

Personal information
- Date of birth: 19 November 1977 (age 48)
- Place of birth: Bitonto, Italy
- Height: 1.73 m (5 ft 8 in)
- Position: Midfielder

Senior career*
Years	Team	Apps	(Gls)
1995–1996	Bari	0	(0)
1996	Pistoiese	6	(0)
1996–1997	Bari	2	(0)
1997–1998	Giulianova	31	(1)
1998–1999	Treviso	24	(1)
1999–2007	Bari	248	(6)
2008–2009	Verona	33	(1)
2009	Andria BAT	6	(0)
- * Club domestic league appearances and goals

Antonio Bellavista (born 19 November 1977) is an Italian footballer who is retired. He played as a midfielder.

== Career ==
=== Early career ===
He grows in Bitonto and then he passed to A.S. Bari.

=== Bari ===
Bellavista passed in 1995–1996 season in the first team of Bari, but he didn't play.

=== Pistoiese ===
He joined to Pistoiese for a season. He played 6 matches, (0 goals).

=== Bari ===
He returned to Bari for a season, but he played only 2 matches (0 goals).

=== Giulianova ===
He joined to Giulianova, and he grows very much. He played for a season (31 matches, 1 goal).

=== Treviso ===
He joined to Treviso for a season and he played 24 matches (1 goal).

=== Bari ===
He returned to Bari from 1999 to 2007. Bellavista played 248 matches (6 goals). He played for 2 seasons (42 games, 1 goal) in the Serie A for A.S. Bari.

=== Verona ===
He joined to Verona in 2008–2009 season. He played 33 matches (1 goal)

=== Andria BAT ===
He returned in Apulia in 2009 with Andria BAT. He played 6 matches (0 goals)

Bellavista was given a 5-year suspension in June 2011 following his involvement in the 2011–12 Italian football scandal.
