= Alberto Fontana (footballer, born 1967) =

Italian footballer

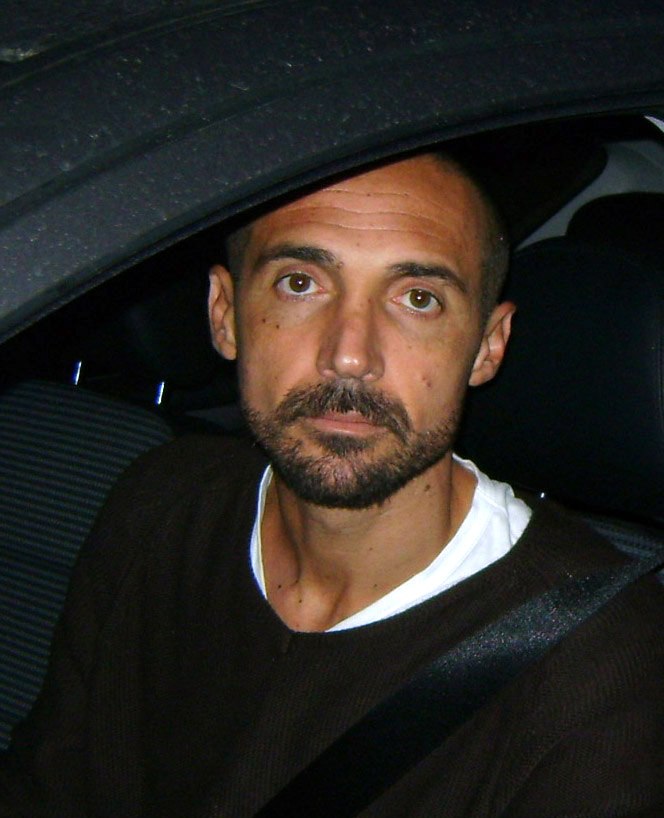
- Alberto Fontana

Personal information
- Date of birth: 23 January 1967 (age 59)
- Place of birth: Cesena, Italy
- Height: 1.85 m (6 ft 1 in)
- Position: Goalkeeper

Youth career
- 1985–1986: Cesena

Senior career*
Years	Team	Apps	(Gls)
1986–1993	Cesena	103	(0)
1986–1987	→ Vis Pesaro (loan)	2	(0)
1988–1989	→ SPAL (loan)	29	(0)
1993–1997	Bari	133	(0)
1997–2000	Atalanta	100	(0)
2001	Napoli	14	(0)
2001–2005	Inter Milan	10	(0)
2005–2006	Chievo	29	(0)
2006–2009	Palermo	66	(0)
Total		486	(0)
- * Club domestic league appearances and goals

Alberto Fontana (born 23 January 1967) is an Italian former professional footballer who played as a goalkeeper.

During his career, in which he represented nine different clubs, he played until the age of 42. He played in 241 Serie A games during 15 seasons, representing in the competition Cesena, Bari, Atalanta, Napoli, Inter Milan, Chievo and Palermo.

== Football career ==
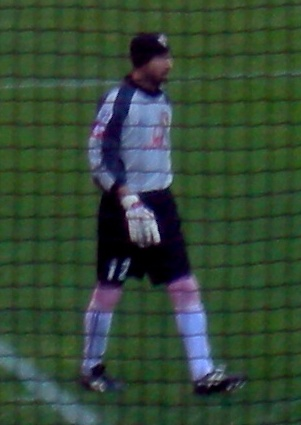
Fontana during a game with Palermo, in 2008

Born in Cesena, Fontana started his career with his hometown club, Cesena, but made his professional debut with Vis Pesaro of Serie C2, where he was loaned during the 1986–87 season. Before the decade was over, he played on loan for Serie C1 club SPAL.

In 1989, Fontana returned to Cesena and made his Serie A debut with the Romagna side on 9 September 1990. After they suffered relegation at the end of the campaign he stayed for two further years, signing in the 1993 summer with Bari, where he was first choice during his spell (two seasons apiece in each major division).

Aged 30, Fontana moved in 1997 to Atalanta, winning top-flight promotion in 2000. In January of the following year, he was signed by Napoli, playing for the club for the following six months. During the summer he accepted an offer from Internazionale, which were looking for a backup for Francesco Toldo; he eventually stayed four seasons and played in 24 official matches – ten in the league, two in the UEFA Champions League, four in the UEFA Cup and eight in the Coppa Italia.

In 2005, Fontana signed a one-year deal with Chievo, playing regularly and being instrumental in the team's successful league campaign, which ended with qualification for the 2006–07 UEFA Cup. The club was ultimately admitted to the Champions League qualifying rounds following the 2006 Italian football scandal.

Subsequently, Fontana moved to Palermo, with the initial aim being of serving as an experienced backup alongside young promise Federico Agliardi. However, an injury occurred to Agliardi, who additionally did not play impressively during the early matches of 2006–07, so Fontana was promoted to the starting lineup by Francesco Guidolin.

At the age of 40, Fontana was confirmed by Palermo for their 2007–08 season, starting for the Rosanero with impressively good results despite being the second-oldest player in the whole Serie A, only behind 44-year-old Marco Ballotta of Lazio, also a goalkeeper.

In 2008–09, he returned to the bench following the signing of Italian international Marco Amelia, only making his debut on 26 October 2008 as a half-time replacement to injured Amelia in a 1–3 home loss to Fiorentina, a game that saw him being welcomed with a standing ovation from the whole stadium, a moment he later defined "the biggest emotion in my football career". He also played in the following match, against Lecce.

In December 2008, Fontana was put out of the first-team squad, after disagreements with the club regarding his position in the squad – he was demoted to as low as third choice, behind Albanian youngster Samir Ujkani. Palermo chairman Maurizio Zamparini then confirmed to have formally authorized him to start searching a new club where he could play regularly, but the player eventually stayed until the end of the campaign, retiring shortly after.

== Personal life ==
Fontana is not related to another football goalkeeper, also named Alberto Fontana, who also had an extensive professional career, also appearing for a host of clubs. As his footballing namesake, he was nicknamed Jimmy after singer Jimmy Fontana.

== Honours ==
Inter

- Coppa Italia: 2004–05
