= Francesco Ruopolo =

Italian footballer

Personal information
- Date of birth: 10 March 1983 (age 43)
- Place of birth: Aversa, Italy
- Height: 1.85 m (6 ft 1 in)
- Position: Forward

Youth career
- –2002: Parma

Senior career*
Years	Team	Apps	(Gls)
2002–2006	Parma	16	(0)
2002–2003	→ Pro Patria (loan)	32	(4)
2003–2004	→ Cittadella (loan)	31	(6)
2005	→ Lokomotiv Moscow (loan)	7	(0)
2006–2007	Triestina	13	(0)
2007–2010	AlbinoLeffe	137	(40)
2010–2011	Atalanta	31	(8)
2011–2012	Padova	33	(7)
2013–2015	Reggiana	56	(15)
2015–2017	Mantova	33	(5)
2017–2018	AC Rezzato	29	(6)
2018	Nuova Bagnolese		
2018–2019	Castelvetro Calcio	16	(6)
Total		434	(97)

International career
2000	Italy U16	5	(1)
2002–2004	Italy U20	23	(4)
- * Club domestic league appearances and goals

Francesco Ruopolo (born 10 March 1983) is an Italian former professional footballer who played as a forward.

== Club career ==
=== Parma ===
Born in Aversa, Campania region, Ruopolo started his career at Emilia–Romagna side Parma. He was the member of Primavera under-20 team and in 2002 made his professional debut with Pro Patria of Serie C1, where he was sent on loan for a season.

He was then loaned to Cittadella, again in Serie C1, where he scored six goals. On 1 July 2004, he returned to Parma, playing 21 games (9 in the UEFA Cup, 1 in the Coppa Italia, and 1 in the relegation playoffs) without scoring any goals; however noted by FC Lokomotiv Moscow, that signs him on loan for the 2005 Russian season. He played seven Russian league matches for Lokomotiv, made two substitution appearances in UEFA Champions League third qualifying round, and started 4 games and made 2 substitution appearances in UEFA Cup, scored two goals against S.K. Brann and Maccabi Petah Tikva FC. He returned to Parma in January 2006, and made six more Serie A appearances and 1 more at Cup for the Gialloblu.

=== Triestina & AlbinoLeffe ===
In July 2006, Ruopolo was signed by Serie B club Triestina in co-ownership deal, but he failed to impress in Trieste and moved to AlbinoLeffe in January 2007 in another co-ownership deal. He scored 8 league goals for AlbinoLeffe in his first season, and the club decided to buy him outright. He then scored an average of 10 Serie B goals a season in the next 3 seasons for the Province of Bergamo based side.

=== Atalanta ===
On 5 July 2010, he moved to cross-town "rival" Atalanta Bergamo, which they shared the same stadium on free transfer. He signed a 3-year contract. Atalanta Bergamo was relegated from Serie A in May 2010 and had sold numbers of players to AlbinoLeffe in previous seasons. In the 2010–11 season, Ruopolo played 31 matches and scored 8 times for the Dea.

In May 2012, Atalanta received two penalty points and a €25,000 fine as several players, including Ruopolo, had been accused of match fixing.

=== Padova & football scandal ===
In July 2011, Ruopolo was moved to Calcio Padova on free transfer. He was banned for 16 months after plea bargain for involvement in 2011–12 Italian football scandal. He was released by Padova in July 2012.

== International career ==
During the "Festival International Espoirs de Toulon et du Var" in 2003, Ruopolo scored one goal against Portugal in the final of the tournament.
