= Nicola Belmonte =

Italian footballer

Personal information
- Full name: Nicola Belmonte
- Date of birth: 15 April 1987 (age 39)
- Place of birth: Cosenza, Italy
- Height: 1.83 m (6 ft 0 in)
- Position: Defender

Youth career
- Bari

Senior career*
Years	Team	Apps	(Gls)
2004–2008	Bari	55	(0)
2004–2005	→ Melfi (loan)	8	(0)
2008–2014	Siena	29	(1)
2009–2011	→ Bari (loan)	44	(0)
2014–2015	Udinese	2	(0)
2015	Catania	10	(0)
2015–2018	Perugia	79	(4)
2018–2019	Robur Siena	2	(0)

Managerial career
- 2025–2026: Folgore Caratese
- * Club domestic league appearances and goals

Nicola Belmonte (born 15 April 1987) is an Italian professional football coach and former player. He preferred to play as a right back but could also play as a centre back.

== Playing career ==
=== Bari ===
Before making his professional debut in the 2004–2005 season, Nicola Belmonte was developed as a youth prospect at AS Bari. He made more than 100 appearances over two different stints, solidifying his reputation as a dependable and tactically adaptable defender who could play centre back or right back. His most notable time at the San Nicola Stadium was from 2009 to 2011. He was a consistent member of the starting eleven during the 2010–2011 Serie A season, frequently covering for central defence injuries. Due to the high regard for his defensive contributions, he received a sizable long-term contract extension in late 2010. In a multiplayer exchange, however, he eventually relocated to Siena.

=== Siena ===
In July 2008, he was signed by A.C. Siena in co-ownership deal, for €1.2 million, However, after just played one league match for Siena in 2008–09 Serie A, Belmonte returned to A.S. Bari on loan. In the first season he played a few games, as the team had Leonardo Bonucci and Andrea Ranocchia as centre-backs.

In September 2010, he extended his contract with Bari from 2013 to 2015. In ca. 2010 his contract with Siena also extended to 30 June 2014. He was the centre-back of the team along with Marco Rossi, but sometimes moved to right back when Andrea Masiello was unavailable. The coach also tested Andrea Raggi as starting rightback at the start of season, made Belmonte as sub and A.Masiello moved to centre-back. Despite the arrival of Kamil Glik in mid-season, Glik injury made Belmonte's role unaffected. He also missed a few games since 24 January due to injury. He was replaced in the first half on 6 March, his first match since injury.

On 23 June 2011, he returned to Siena for a second spell at the club. Bari and Siena made a pure player swap, which Belmonte (€1.25 million), Pedro Kamata (€500,000) and Filippo Carobbio (€500,00) moved to Siena outright, and Abdelkader Ghezzal moved to Bari outright (€2.25 million).

On 10 August 2012, he was suspended for 6 months due to involvement in 2011 Italian football scandal; the ban later reduced to 4 months by Tribunale Nazionale di Arbitrato per lo Sport of CONI.

=== Udinese ===
On 17 June 2014, Belmonte was signed by Udinese Calcio on a free transfer.

=== Catania ===
On 8 January 2015, Belmonte was signed by Calcio Catania.

=== Perugia ===
On 27 July 2015, Belmonte was signed by Perugia.

=== Robur Siena ===
On 14 September 2018, he returned for the third time to Siena, signing a three-year contract. On 24 May 2019, he had to announce his retirement from playing due to persistent medical problems with his knee.

== Coaching career ==
In the summer of 2024, Belmonte was hired as the new Under-19 coach of hometown club Cosenza. On 26 February 2025, following the dismissal of Massimiliano Alvini, Belmonte was promoted in charge of the first team together with Pierantonio Tortelli. As Belmonte did not own a valid UEFA Pro coaching license by the time of his promotion, he officially appeared as an assistant to Tortelli.

On 1 July 2025, Belmonte was announced as the new head coach of Serie D club Folgore Caratese. Under his tenure, Folgore Caratese won its Serie D group and a first-ever promotion to Serie C. He was dismissed on 5 October 2026 following a lackluster start of the 2026–27 Serie C campaign.
