= Luca Fiuzzi =

Italian footballer

Personal information
- Date of birth: 29 August 1984 (age 42)
- Place of birth: Imperia, Italy
- Height: 1.73 m (5 ft 8 in)
- Position: Defender

Youth career
- –2002: Valenzana
- 2002–2004: Empoli

Senior career*
Years	Team	Apps	(Gls)
2004–2007	Cuoiopelli Cappiano	54	(3)
2007–2009	Empoli	0	(0)
2007–2008	→ Reggiana (loan)	17	(0)
2008–2009	→ Foligno (loan)	21	(0)
2009–2012	Monza	76	(2)
2012–2015	Argentina	33	(3)
2015–2017	Sanremese	16	(0)
2017–2018	Argentina	30	(2)
2018–2023	Taggia	100	(?)

Managerial career
- 2023–: Taggia
- * Club domestic league appearances and goals

Luca Fiuzzi (born 29 August 1984) is an Italian footballer.

== Biography ==
Fiuzzi started his career at Empoli F.C. Fiuzzi joined Cuoiopelli Cappiano in temporary deal in 2004–05 season. In the next 2 seasons Fiuzzi joined the club in co-ownership deal. In June 2007 Empoli bought back Fiuzzi. Fiuzzi spent 2007–08 and 2008–09 season in temporary deal in Reggiana and Foligno.

In 2009, Fiuzzi left for Monza in another co-ownership deal. In June 2011 Empoli gave up the remain 50% registration rights for free.

=== Italian football scandal ===
On 18 June 2012 he was banned 4 years due to 2011–12 Italian football scandal. His final appeal was partially accepted by Tribunale Nazionale di Arbitrato per lo Sport of CONI on 21 March, which his ban was reduced to 1 year (from June 2012 to June 2013).
