= Carlo Gervasoni =

Italian footballer (born 1982)

Personal information
- Date of birth: 4 January 1982 (age 44)
- Place of birth: Legnano, Italy
- Height: 1.86 m (6 ft 1 in)
- Position: Central defender

Youth career
- Como

Senior career*
Years	Team	Apps	(Gls)
1999–2001	Como	2	(0)
2001–2004	South Tyrol	77	(2)
2004–2006	Verona	48	(5)
2006–2007	Bari	26	(1)
2007–2009	AlbinoLeffe	69	(2)
2009–2010	Mantova	13	(0)
2010–2011	Cremonese	13	(0)
2011	→ Piacenza (loan)	16	(0)
- * Club domestic league appearances and goals as of 14:58, 4 January 2010 (UTC)

Carlo Gervasoni (born 4 January 1982) is a former Italian footballer who played as a defender. His career ended in 2011 after a ban from football due to his involvement in the 2011 Italian football match-fixing scandal; the ban is set to end in 2018.

== Career ==
Gervasoni started his career at a small Lombard club Como. In mid-2001, Gervasoni and Marco Mallus joined South Tyrol of Serie C2; concurrently Luigi Crisopulli returned to Como. During his three seasons with Tyrol, Gervasoni was a regular starter. In June 2004 Como bought back Gervasoni outright for €120,000 but sold to Geona for free. But Genoa immediately sold him to Verona in another co-ownership deal, for €500,000. Although he just played 24 matches, Verona sign him permanently. After he played another 24 matches, he left for fellow Serie B Bari in co-ownership deal. Luigi Anaclerio also joined Verona also in co-ownership on the same day. In June Verona bought back Gervasoni.

In August 2007, he joined Albinoleffe in another co-ownership deal, for €560,000. He signed a 3-year contract. Gervasoni back to play as a regular starter and he secured a permanent deal in June 2008 for another €95,000.

On 31 August 2009, Gervasoni was exchanged with Dario Passoni. After the relegation and bankruptcy of Mantova, he joined Cremonese. In January 2011 he left for Serie B club Piacenza. Francesco Bini also joined Cremonese in exchange.

He was banned from football activity for five years due to involvement in the 2011 Italian football scandal; an additional one-year and 8 months was added in May 2012; four more months were added in August, meaning Gervasoni will serve a 7-year ban.
