= 2002–03 Serie C1 =

Italian football league season

The 2002–03 Serie C1 was the twenty-fifth edition of Serie C1, the third highest league in the Italian football league system.

== Serie C1/A ==
=== League table ===
Pos	Team	Pld	W	D	L	GF	GA	GD	Pts

=== Play-off ===
==== Semifinal ====
Location and Date	Team 1	Score	Team 2
Padua, 25 May 2003	Padova	1–2	Albinoleffe
Cremona, 1 June 2003	Albinoleffe	0–1	Padova
Pisa, 25 May 2003	Pisa	1–0	Cesena
Cesena, 1 June 2003	Cesena	1–1	Pisa

==== Final ====
Location and Date	Team 1	Score	Team 2
Pisa, 8 June 2003	Pisa	2–1	Albinoleffe
Bergamo, 15 June 2003	Albinoleffe	4 – 2 (a.e.t.)	(Pisa)

=== Play-out ===
Location and Date	Team 1	Score	Team 2
Bergamo, 25 May 2003	Alzano Virescit	1–2	Lucchese
Lucca, 1 June 2003	Lucchese	1–1	Alzano Virescit
Carrara, 25 May 2003	Carrarese	1–1	Varese
Varese, 1 June 2003	Varese	1–1	Carrarese

=== Verdict ===
Promoted in Serie B

- Treviso
- Albinoleffe

Relegated in Serie C2

- Arezzo
- Alzano Virescit and Carrarese

Repechage to Serie C1 2003-2004

- Arezzo

Team Failed

- Alzano Virescit

=== Record ===
- Most wins: Treviso (19)
- Fewer defeats: Albinoleffe (5)
- Best attack: Albinoleffe (62 goals scored)
- Best defense: Pisa (27 goals conceded)
- Best goal difference: Albinoleffe (+26)
- Most draw: Reggiana (18)
- Fewer defeats: Calcio Treviso (8)
- Most defeats: Arezzo (18)
- Fewer wins: Albinoleffe (5)
- Worst attack: Lucchese (28 goals scored)
- Worst defense: Alzano Virescit (52 goals conceded)
- Worst goal difference: Alzano Virescit (-19)
- Bomber: Ciro Ginestra (21 goals, Padova)

== Serie C1/B ==
=== League table ===
Pos	Team	Pld	W	D	L	GF	GA	GD	Pts
1	U.S. Avellino	34	21	6	7	51	25	+26	69
2	Pescara Calcio	34	20	9	5	64	36	+28	69
3	A.C. Martina	34	18	8	8	52	37	+15	62
4	Teramo Calcio	34	15	13	6	58	40	+18	58
5	U.S. Sambenedettese	34	14	14	6	46	26	+20	56
6	F.C. Crotone	34	14	8	12	40	29	+11	50
7	S.S. Virtus Lanciano 1924	34	12	13	9	39	39	0	49
8	Benevento Calcio	34	10	14	10	27	32	−5	44
9	A.S. Taranto Calcio	34	10	11	13	31	35	−4	41
10	Chieti Calcio	34	9	14	11	28	32	−4	41
11	A.S. Viterbese Calcio	34	10	9	15	37	50	−13	39
12	Torres Calcio	34	9	11	14	34	37	−3	38
13	Vis Pesaro	34	7	15	12	29	40	−11	36
14	A.S. Paternò Calcio	34	9	8	17	31	46	−15	35
15	Giulianova Calcio	34	8	11	15	29	37	−8	35
16	A.S. Sora	34	8	10	16	36	48	−12	34
17	L'Aquila Calcio 1927	34	8	9	17	30	53	−23	33
18	U.S. Fermana	34	7	11	16	28	48	−20	32

=== Play-off ===
==== Semifinal ====
Location and Date	Team 1	Score	Team 2
San Benedetto del Tronto, 25 May 2003	Sambenedettese	1–0	Pescara
Pescara, 1 June 2003	Pescara	2–0	Sambenedettese
Teramo, 25 May 2003	Teramo	1–0	Martina
Martina Franca, 1 June 2003	Martina	1–0	Teramo

==== Final ====
Location and Date	Team 1	Score	Team 2
Martina Franca, 8 June 2003	Martina	0–0	Pescara
Pescara, 15 June 2003	Pescara	2–0	Calcio Martina

=== Play-out ===
Location and Date	Team 1	Score	Team 2
L'Aquila, 25 May 2003	L'Aquila	1–0	Paternò
Paternò, 1 June 2003	Calcio Paternò	0–0	L'Aquila
Sora, 25 May 2003	Sora	0–0	Giulianova
Giulianova, 1 June 2003	Giulianova	0–0	Sora

=== Verdict ===
Promoted to Serie B

- Avellino
- Pescara

Relegated to Serie C2

- Fermana
- Paternò and Sora

Repechage to Serie C1 2003-2004

- Fermana, Paternò and Sora

=== Record ===
- Most wins: Avellino (21)
- Fewer defeats: Pescara (5)
- Best attack: Pescara (64 goals scored)
- Best defense: Avellino (25 goals conceded)
- Best goal difference: Pescara (+28)
- Most draws: Vis Pesaro (15)
- Fewer draws: Avellino (6)
- Most defeats: L'Aquila and Paternò (17)
- Fewer wins: Fermana and Vis Pesaro (7)
- Worst attack: Benevento (27 goals scored)
- Worst defense: L'Aquila (53 goals conceded)
- Worst goal difference: L'Aquila (-23)
- Bomber: Simone Motta (23 goals, Teramo)
