= Edoardo Catinali =

Italian professional football player (born 1982)

Personal information
- Full name: Edoardo Catinali
- Date of birth: August 16, 1982 (age 44)
- Place of birth: Naples, Italy
- Height: 1.75 m (5 ft 9 in)
- Position: Midfielder

Team information
- Current team: Grumentum Val d'Agri

Senior career*
Years	Team	Apps	(Gls)
–2001	Ancona	0	(0)
2002–2004	Taranto	21	(0)
2004–2006	Teramo	69	(1)
2007	Grosseto	13	(0)
2007–2008	Perugia	24	(1)
2008–2010	Ancona	62	(0)
2010–2011	Piacenza	29	(0)
2012	L'Aquila	12	(0)
2013–2014	Ischia	9	(0)
2014	Real Vicenza	9	(0)
2014–2015	Aversa Normanna	23	(0)
2015–2016	Racing Fondi	27	(0)
2016	Folgore Caratese	12	(0)
2016–2017	Sicula	18	(0)
2017–2018	Latina	26	(0)
2018	Castrovillari	9	(0)
2018–2019	Team Altamura	19	(0)
2019–2020	Grumentum Val d'Agri	20	(0)
2020	Gravina		
2020-2021	Puteolana		
2021	Frattese		
2021-	Puteolana		
- * Club domestic league appearances and goals as of 23:58, 6 February 2020 (UTC)

Edoardo Catinali (born 16 August 1982 in Naples) is an Italian professional football player who plays for Serie D club A.S.D. Puteolana 1902.

On 11 August 2012 he was suspended for 3 year and a half due to 2011 Italian football scandal.
