= Alberto Fontana (footballer, born 1974) =

Italian retired footballer

Personal information
- Full name: Alberto Maria Fontana
- Date of birth: 2 December 1974 (age 51)
- Place of birth: Turin, Italy
- Height: 1.88 m (6 ft 2 in)
- Position: Goalkeeper

Youth career
- 1992–1994: Juventus

Senior career*
Years	Team	Apps	(Gls)
1994–1996	Aosta	35	(0)
1996–1998	Voghera	38	(0)
1998–2001	Verona	2	(0)
1999	→ Reggiana (loan)	1	(0)
2000	→ Sandonà (loan)	9	(0)
2000–2001	→ Pistoiese (loan)	1	(0)
2001–2002	Roma	0	(0)
2001–2002	→ Palermo (loan)	1	(0)
2002–2009	Torino	16	(0)
2009–2012	Novara	33	(0)
Total		136	(0)
- * Club domestic league appearances and goals

Alberto Maria Fontana (born 2 December 1974) is an Italian retired footballer who played as a goalkeeper.

He spent the vast majority of his 18-year senior career as a backup. In Serie A, he represented Torino and Novara, for a total of 25 games.

== Football career ==
Born in Turin, Fontana started his career at Juventus but played his first seasons as a senior in Serie C1, Serie C2 and Serie D. In mid-1998, he joined Serie B club Hellas Verona and, the following campaign, he returned to the third division, successively representing Reggiana and Sandonà.

In mid-2000, Fontana returned to the second level, signing with Pistoiese where he served as David Dei's backup. He met the same fate at his new club Palermo (Roma's farm team at that time), to Vincenzo Sicignano.

In June 2002, Fontana joined Torino of the top division in a co-ownership deal, in exchange with Gabriele Paoletti. During his seven-year stint, the longest of his career, he played second-fiddle to Luca Bucci, Stefano Sorrentino, Massimo Taibi, Christian Abbiati and Matteo Sereni.

In summer 2009, 35-year-old Fontana was released by Toro and joined Novara in division three, where he again was second-choice, now to Albania's Samir Ujkani. He also played a few games due to injury of the latter, including 15 in 2011–12's top level, which ended in relegation.

=== Italian football scandal ===
On 18 June 2012, Fontana was banned along with former Novara teammate Nicola Ventola for three years and six months, as the Italian Football Federation found the match between Novara and Chievo for the 2010–11 Coppa Italia to be fixed. Cristian Bertani was also arrested.

In November 2012, Fontana's appeal to the Italian Olympic Committee's TNAS was accepted. His contract was terminated late in that year, and he retired shortly after.

== Personal life ==
Fontana is not related to another football goalkeeper, also named Alberto Fontana, who had an even longer professional career. As his footballing namesake, he was nicknamed Jimmy after singer Jimmy Fontana.

== Honours ==
=== Individual ===
- Torino FC Hall of Fame: 2015
