= Abdelkader Ghezzal =

Footballer (born 1984)

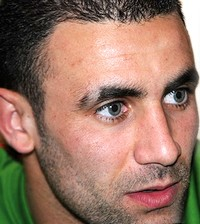

Personal information
- Full name: Abdelkader Mohamed Ghezzal
- Date of birth: 5 December 1984 (age 41)
- Place of birth: Décines-Charpieu, France
- Height: 1.83 m (6 ft 0 in)
- Positions: Striker; midfielder

Youth career
- –1998: Vaulx-en-Velin
- 1998–2002: Olympique Lyon
- 2002–2004: Vaulx-en-Velin

Senior career*
Years	Team	Apps	(Gls)
2004–2005	Saint-Priest	22	(11)
2005–2008	Crotone	39	(20)
2006	→ Biellese (loan)	12	(9)
2006–2007	→ Pro Sesto (loan)	31	(9)
2008–2010	Siena	66	(11)
2010–2013	Bari	37	(4)
2011–2012	→ Cesena (loan)	13	(0)
2012	→ Levante (loan)	16	(2)
2013–2015	Parma	16	(0)
2013–2014	→ Latina (loan)	25	(2)
2015–2016	Como	15	(0)

International career
2008–2012	Algeria	28	(3)
- * Club domestic league appearances and goals

Abdelkader Mohamed Ghezzal (Arabic: عبد القادر غزال; born 5 December 1984) is a former professional footballer who played as a forward or midfield playmaker. Born in France, he made 28 appearances for the Algeria national team scoring 3 goals.

== Club career ==
=== Crotone ===
After starting his career with a number of minor league clubs in France, Ghezzal moved to Italy in 2005 to join Crotone. There, he managed to breakthrough to the higher level by scoring 20 goals in the Serie C1/B 2007–08 season, guiding his club to a Serie B promotion.

=== Siena ===
On 13 June 2008, Ghezzal signed with the Serie A side Genoa C.F.C., for €2 million. However, Ghezzal joined another Serie A squad A.C. Siena on 2 July 2008 for €3.5 million. It was part of the deal that Fernando Forestieri returned to Genoa for €4.5 million. Early in June Manuel Coppola joined Siena in co-ownership deal for €1.5 million.

=== Bari ===
On 1 July 2010, Ghezzal joined A.S. Bari, signing a four-year contract with the club, in co-ownership deal, for €2.25 million. Co-currently, Siena signed Pedro Kamatà and Filippo Carobbio also in co-ownership deal, for €500,000 each, made Ghezzal worth €1.25 million cash plus players.

In June 2011 Bari purchased Ghezzal outright for pre-agreed €2.25 million, again, it involved player swap. Kamatà and Carobbio joined Siena outright for pre-agreed price (€1 million in total), as well as Nicola Belmonte joined Siena outright after two-year loan in Bari for €1.25 million, thus the deal did not involve cash.

On 31 August 2011, Ghezzal joined A.C. Cesena on a season-long loan deal.

=== Parma ===
On 29 August 2013 he was signed by Parma F.C. for undisclosed fee, after refusing an offer from Kazakhstan. He was signed by Latina in temporary deal immediately.

== International career ==
On 23 October 2008, in an interview with A.C. Siena's official website, Ghezzal indicated that he had spoken with Algeria head coach Rabah Saadane and that he was going to represent Algeria in international competition. Ghezzal had the opportunity to represent France, having been born there.

On 12 November 2008, Ghezzal was called up by Algeria manager Rabah Saadane for a friendly against Mali on 18 November 2008 in Rouen, France.

On 11 February 2009, Ghezzal scored his first goal for Algeria in a 2–1 win over Benin.

On 13 June, at the 2010 FIFA World Cup group stage, Ghezzal was brought on as a substitute in a match against Slovenia, but was subsequently sent off for two yellow card offences within thirteen minutes of being on the pitch.

== Personal life ==
His younger brother, Rachid Ghezzal, is also a footballer and currently plays for Beşiktaş.

== Career statistics ==
=== Club ===
Appearances and goals by club, season and competition
Club	Season	League			Cup (Note: Includes Coppa Italia, Copa del Rey)		Continental		Total	
Club	Season	Division	Apps	Goals	Apps	Goals	Apps	Goals	Apps	Goals
Siena	2008–09	Serie A	36	5	1	0	–		37	5
Siena	2009–10	Serie A	30	6	1	0	–		31	6
Siena	Total		66	11	2	0	0	0	68	11
Bari	2010–11	Serie A	20	2	0	0	–		20	2
Bari	2012–13	Serie B	17	2	0	0	–		17	2
Bari	Total		37	4	0	0	0	0	37	4
Cesena (loan)	2011–12	Serie A	13	0	1	0	–		14	0
Levante (loan)	2011–12	La Liga	16	2	0	0	–		16	2
Career total			132	17	3	0	0	0	135	17

=== International ===
Scores and results list Algeria's goal tally first, score column indicates score after each Ghezzal goal.

List of international goals scored by Abdelkader Ghezzal
No.	Date	Venue	Opponent	Score	Result	Competition
1	11 February 2009	Blida, Algeria	Benin		2–1	Friendly
2	7 June 2009	Blida, Algeria	Egypt		3–1	2010 FIFA World Cup qualification
3	11 October 2009	Blida, Algeria	Rwanda		3–1	2010 FIFA World Cup qualification
