= Cristian Bertani =

Italian footballer (born 1981)

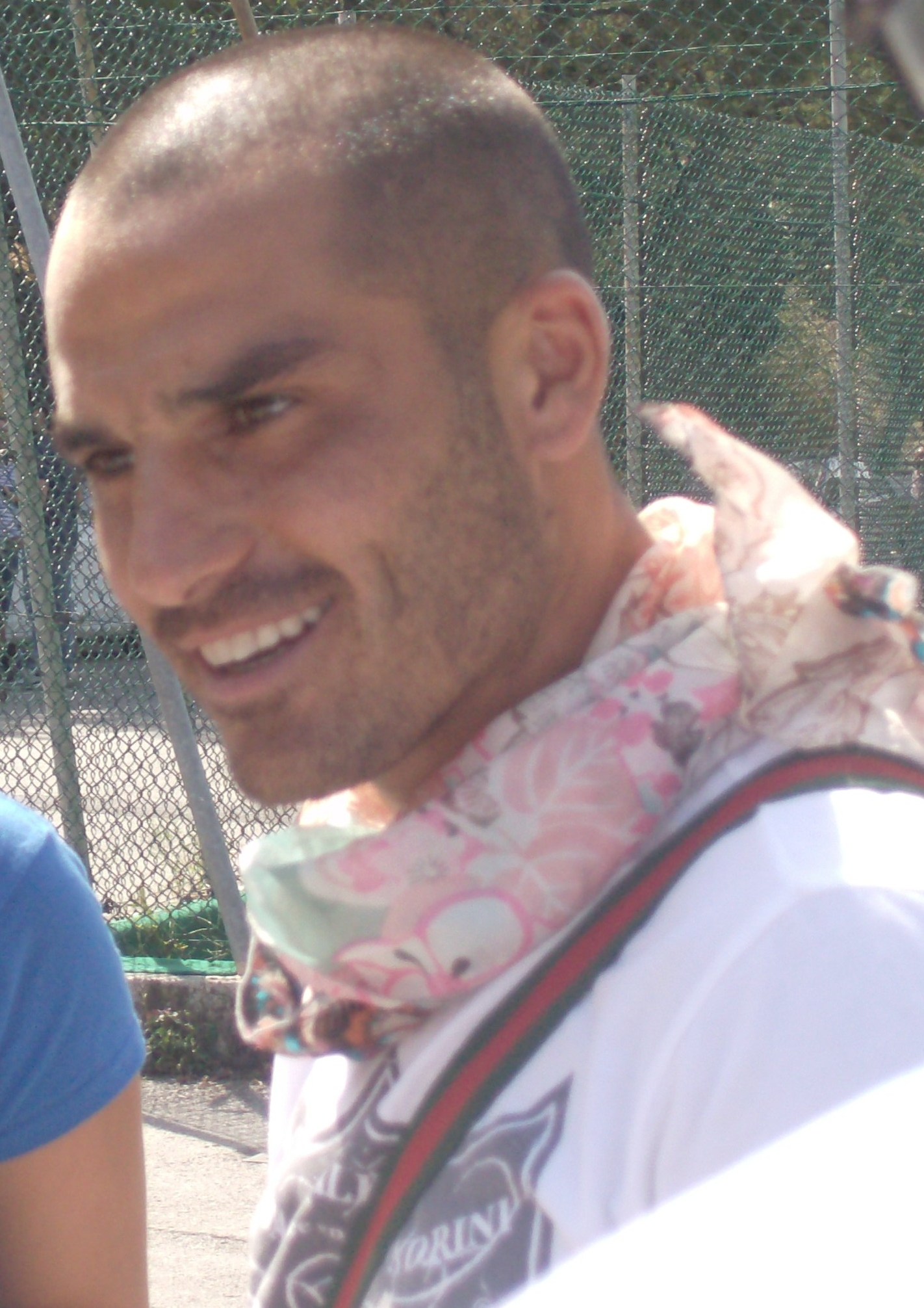
- Cristian Bertani in 2011

Personal information
- Date of birth: 14 March 1981 (age 45)
- Place of birth: Legnano, Italy
- Height: 1.71 m (5 ft 7 in)
- Position: Forward

Team information
- Current team: Pro Novara

Youth career
- Como

Senior career*
Years	Team	Apps	(Gls)
1999–2000	Como	32	(3)
2000–2003	Venezia	7	(0)
2001	→ Savoia (loan)	7	(0)
2001–2002	→ Carrarese (loan)	26	(4)
2003	→ Südtirol (loan)	13	(7)
2003–2004	Como	2	(0)
2004	Varese	17	(1)
2004–2005	Grosseto	26	(0)
2005–2008	Ivrea	83	(36)
2008–2011	Novara	97	(38)
2011–2012	Sampdoria	30	(6)
2016–2017	Como	33	(4)
2017–2018	Lecco	22	(14)
2018–2019	Pro Sesto	29	(16)
2019	Seregno	18	(3)
2019–2020	Milano City	2	(0)
2020–2021	Sant'Angelo		
2021	Fulgor Valdengo		
2021	Sant'Angelo		
2021–2022	Ardor Lazzate		
2022–	Pro Novara		
- * Club domestic league appearances and goals as of 20:41, 2 May 2020 (UTC)

Cristian Bertani (born 14 March 1981) is an Italian footballer who plays for as a forward for an amateur club Pro Novara. He was suspended in August 2012 for three years and six months.

== Career ==
=== Como ===
Born in Legnano, Lombardy, Bertani started his career with Serie C1 club Como.

=== Venezia ===
In 2000, he was sold to Serie B club Venezia in co-ownership deal, for 600 million lire. Bertani made his Serie B debut on 10 September 2000, substituted Arturo Di Napoli in the 68th minute. That match, Venezia 2–2 drew with Cittadella by the late goal of Fabian Valtolina. He was loaned to Savoia of Serie C1 in mid-season and to Carrarese of Serie C1 after Venezia promoted to Serie A in 2001.

Bertani returned to Venice in 2002 after the team was relegated from Serie A. Due to the club owner Maurizio Zamparini taking most of the squad to his new club Palermo, Bertani made 4 league appearances before being loaned to Serie C2 for Südtirol in January 2003. He scored 7 league goals in half a season.

=== Como Return, Varese & Grosseto ===
In June 2003, Como bought him back, which the team had recently been relegated from Serie A, as well as the withdrawal of Enrico Preziosi. He failed to play regularly with Como, just played twice. In January 2004, Bertani returned to Serie C1 again, this time for Varese. After the team went bankrupt, he was signed by Grosseto, his 4th Serie C1 club.

=== Ivrea ===
In August 2005 he left for Serie C2 side Ivrea. He followed the team promoted to Serie C1 in 2006 and relegated back to Serie C2 in 2007. In his last season with the Piedmont club, he scored a career high of 23 goals in Serie C2.

=== Novara ===
In June 2008, he was signed by Novara He won Lega Pro Prima Divisione in 2010 and promoted to Serie B. Partnered with Simone Motta, they netted 26 goals for the team that season.

In the 2010–11 Serie B season, he scored 17 goals in 35 matches.

=== Sampdoria ===
In July 2011, he was signed by Sampdoria. He was released before the end of the season due to his involvement in the 2011–2012 Italian football scandal, which led to him being arrested on 28 May 2012.

== Honours ==
- Lega Pro Prima Divisione: 2010
