= Roberto Amodio =

Italian footballer (born 1961)

Personal information
- Full name: Roberto Amodio
- Date of birth: 20 October 1961 (age 65)
- Place of birth: Castellammare di Stabia, Italy
- Height: 1.82 m (5 ft 11 1/2 in)
- Position: Defender

Youth career
- Napoli

Senior career*
Years	Team	Apps	(Gls)
1979—1980	Napoli	0	(0)
1980—1981	Messina	34	(1)
1981—1983	Napoli	19	(0)
1983—1984	Cavese	36	(7)
1984—1990	Avellino	176	(2)
1990—1992	Lecce	55	(0)
1992—1993	Taranto	27	(0)
1993—1999	Juve Stabia	168	(4)
1999—2000	Turris	20	(0)
- * Club domestic league appearances and goals

Roberto Amodio (born 20 October 1961) is an Italian Director of football and a former footballer who played as a defender.

== Club career ==
Amodio started his career with the Napoli junior team. After a brief stint in Serie C2 with Messina, he returned to S.S.C. Napoli and made his debut with them in Serie A in the 1981–82 season. In the summer of 1983 he was traded to Cavese in Serie B.

His performances for Cavese caught the attention of several Serie A teams which led to his return to Serie A the following season, when he joined Avellino. He quickly became a core team member for Avellino and played for them for 6 seasons, the last of which in Serie B. In 1989 the team decided to sell him.

In 1990, Amodio returned to Serie A after being transferred to Lecce, coached by the legendary Zbigniew Boniek. Once again he performed well, but that season Lecce was relegated to Serie B. He played the following season for Lecce in Serie B, and in 1992 he was transferred to Taranto. After a disastrous season the team was relegated to Serie C1.

In 1993, he was transferred to his hometown team, Serie C1 side Juve Stabia, where he was made team captain. He remained with Juve Stabia until the 1999 season. In his time there, the team reached the playoffs several times, but never gained promotion to Serie B. In subsequent years he continued to play in Campania, first with Avellino again and then with Turris, where he finished his professional career in 2000.

== Management career ==
Amodio served as a Director of football for Sorrento, following which he became administrator and general manager for Juve Stabia. On 10 October 2011 he resigned from his position as manager after receiving a three-year ban from football-related activities because of his involvement in the 2011 betting scandal.
