= SKS365 =

Italian sports-betting operator

SKS365 Malta Ltd
- Type: Subsidiary
- Industry: Sports betting Gaming
- Founded: 2009; 17 years ago
- Headquarters: Malta
- Products: Planetwin365; PlanetPay365; Calcio.com
- Number of employees: 500
- Parent: Lottomatica
- Website: www.sks365.com

SKS365 Group was an Austria founded sports betting and iGaming company established in 2009 in Innsbruck. The company operated through a retail network of approximately 1,000 betting shops and manages the Planetwin365 brand in Italy. SKS365 maintains offices in Italy, Malta, Austria, and Serbia and employs approximately 500 people.

In August 2016, Dutch investment firm Ramphastos Investments, owned by Marcel Boekhoorn, acquired a 70 percent stake in SKS365 and completed the acquisition of the remaining shares in November 2017. In April 2024, SKS365 was acquired by Lottomatica in a transaction valuing the company at €639 million.

== Partners ==
From July 2018, the Dignity Decree introduced an Italian ban on gambling advertising and sponsorship, ending most of SKS365's existing sports partnerships. SKS365 was an Institutional Partner of S.S.C. Napoli for the 2018–19 season, and held visibility agreements on the fields of S.S. Lazio, Fiorentina, Genoa, Sampdoria, Cagliari, Parma, Chievo, Empoli, Udinese, Salernitana and Lecce. The company was Title Sponsor of the Italian Futsal Division.

== Recognitions ==
- 2019 EGR Italy Awards, Best Marketing Campaign, with the claim "Il nostro gioco è di un altro pianeta" (our game is from another planet).
- 2018 ITQF Quality Seal, Most Qualified Customer Service.
