= Vincenzo Esposito (footballer) =

Italian football coach and former player

Personal information
- Date of birth: 5 February 1963 (age 63)
- Place of birth: Turin, Italy
- Position: Midfielder

Team information
- Current team: Livorno (head coach)

Senior career*
Years	Team	Apps	(Gls)
1981–1982	Torino	2	(0)
1982–1986	Prato	116	(1)
1986–1988	Lazio	47	(0)
1988–1989	Atalanta	28	(0)
1989–1992	Cesena	52	(3)
1992–1996	Prato	72	(6)

Managerial career
- 1996–1997: Prato (assistant)
- 1997: Prato
- 1998–2004: Prato
- 2004–2005: Grosseto
- 2005: AlbinoLeffe
- 2006–2009: Inter (Under-19)
- 2009–2010: Ravenna
- 2011–2015: Prato
- 2019–2021: Prato
- 2022–: Livorno
- * Club domestic league appearances and goals

Vincenzo Esposito (born 5 February 1963) is an Italian football coach and former player. He is the manager of the Serie C Group B club Livorno.

== Playing career ==
A midfielder, Esposito made his Serie A debut in 1982 with Torino. He successively joined Prato. He successively played for Lazio in the Serie B, and then for Atalanta and Cesena at the Serie A level. He retired in 1996 after a second stint at Prato, with whom he totalled almost 200 first-team appearances in total.

== Coaching career ==
After retiring, Esposito stayed on at Prato as part of the club's coaching staff, then became the head coach in 1997, and again between 1998 and 2004. He successively went on to work as a head coach for a number of teams in the minor leagues of Italian professionalism, as well as a three-year period as Inter Milan's Under-19 coach.

In 2011, Esposito returned to Prato as their new head coach until 2015, and then again from 2019 to 2021.

On 22 November 2022, he was hired by Serie D club Livorno as their new head coach, under the ownership of former Prato chairman Paolo Toccafondi.
