= Federico Agliardi =

Italian footballer

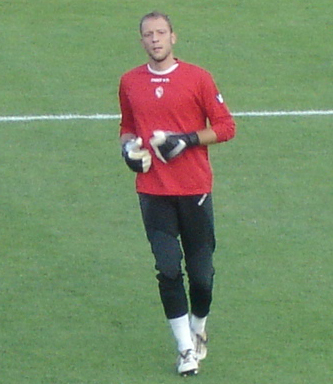

Personal information
- Date of birth: 11 February 1983 (age 43)
- Place of birth: Brescia, Italy
- Height: 1.91 m (6 ft 3 in)
- Position: Goalkeeper

Youth career
- 1999–2002: Brescia

Senior career*
Years	Team	Apps	(Gls)
2002–2006	Brescia	31	(0)
2002–2003	→ Cosenza (loan)	16	(0)
2006–2009	Palermo	29	(0)
2008–2009	→ Rimini (loan)	19	(0)
2009–2011	Padova	45	(0)
2011–2014	Bologna	32	(0)
2014	→ Cesena (loan)	5	(0)
2014–2018	Cesena	43	(0)
2018–2020	Cesena	46	(0)
2020–2021	Lumezzane		
Total		266	(0)

International career
2000	Italy U16	3	(0)
2000–2001	Italy U17	4	(0)
2001	Italy U19	2	(0)
2002–2005	Italy U21	9	(0)
Medal record
Men's football
Representing Italy
UEFA European Under-21 Championship
Winner	2004 Germany
- * Club domestic league appearances and goals

Federico Agliardi (born 11 February 1983) is an Italian former professional footballer who played as a goalkeeper.

== Career ==
=== Brescia ===
Agliardi grew up in his native city's team, Brescia Calcio, and made his professional debut with Cosenza of Serie B on 2002–03. He debuted in Serie A on 8 November 2003 with Brescia in a league match against Bologna.

=== Palermo ===
Agliardi signed for Palermo in January 2006, in a swap deal with Nicola Santoni (50% registration rights), and quickly became a first team regular. In the deal Agliardi was valued €4 million and half of Santoni's rights was valued €1 million He also played for the Italy U-21 national team.

On 17 September 2006, Agliardi and teammate David Di Michele combined to lift the Rosanero to a 2–1 victory over Lazio in Rome. In the latter stages of the first half, Agliardi denied efforts from Cristian Ledesma, Stefano Mauri (twice), Christian Manfredini, Goran Pandev (a rebound attempt from Manfredini's shot, Agliardi deflected the ball past his left-hand post with his foot), and Massimo Oddo. Earlier, Di Michele's 10th- and 38th-minute goals had put Palermo ahead. Lazio did get a consolation goal through Tommaso Rocchi in the 73rd minute. The result elevated Palermo to second place in Serie A, behind Lazio's city rivals and stadium-mates Roma on goal difference, with a 100% record. This performance was followed by a number of less notable ones, including a criticised appearance in a 5–3 Palermo win in a Sicilian derby to Catania, and Agliardi ultimately became a back-up player at Palermo, behind veteran goalkeeper Alberto Fontana, who served as main goalkeeper also in the following 2007–08 season.

Following the acquisition of Italian international Marco Amelia from Livorno, Agliardi's hopes of playing as a regular became even slimmer. Consequently, in July 2008 Palermo finalized a loan move to Serie B side Rimini for the Brescia-born goalkeeper.

=== Padova ===
On 17 July 2009 he was sold to Serie B side Padova on free transfer. Palermo choose to release the player from his contract one year earlier.

=== Bologna ===
On 14 July 2011, Agliardi joined Serie A side Bologna along with José Ángel Crespo and Daniele Vantaggiato. The club had lost Emiliano Viviano as first choice before the start of season. However Agliardi failed to challenge Jean-François Gillet for the starting place, which the Belgian internationals played most of the game. After Gillet left the team for Torino in July 2012, he became Bologna's first-choice goalkeeper, making 22 appearances during the 2012–13 season. However, he returned to his backup role behind on loan goalkeeper Gianluca Curci since the beginning of the second half. Having made no appearances until the first part of the following season, Agliardi signed a loan deal with Serie B side Cesena on 31 January 2014.

=== Cesena ===
On 30 June 2014 Agliardi joined Cesena in definitive deal after a successful loan, with Luca Ceccarelli moved to opposite direction. Agliardi signed a 3-year contract.

=== Lower divisions ===
On 4 September 2020 he signed with fifth-tier club Lumezzane.
