= Roberto Bonazzi =

Italian footballer and coach

Personal information
- Full name: Roberto Bonazzi
- Date of birth: 29 July 1971 (age 55)
- Place of birth: Gazzaniga
- Positions: Forward; attacking midfielder

Senior career*
Years	Team	Apps	(Gls)
1989-1993	Leffe	99	(10)
1993-1994	Monza	10	(0)
1994-1996	Leffe	50	(6)
1996-1998	Lecco	64	(16)
1998-1999	Lumezzane	42	(6)
1999-2000	Montichiari	9	(3)
2000	Valenza	9	(4)
2000-2001	Atletico Catania	19	(3)
2001-2008	AlbinoLeffe	211	(48)
2008-2009	Pergocrema	28	(7)

Managerial career
- 2009-2010: Pergocrema
- 2011-2013: Hellas Verona
- 2013-2014: AlbinoLeffe
- 2016-2017: Pro Patria
- * Club domestic league appearances and goals

Roberto Bonazzi (born 29 July 1971) is an Italian football coach and former footballer.

== Career ==
=== Player ===
He made his professional debut for Leffe making 20 appearances and scoring one goal in Serie C2 in 1990–91. He played for AlbinoLeffe from the 2001–02 season to the 2007–08 season. He ended his playing career in 2009 with Pergocrema, a newly promoted club in the First Division.

=== Manager ===
On 17 November 2009, following the sacking of Claudio Rastelli, he took over with Alessandro Scanziani at the helm of the first team, only to be relieved of his duties again on 24 January 2010, after the defeat to Varese. In 2011-2013 he moved to Hellas Verona, where he led the team in the student category, and then returned, in 2013, to Albino Leffe where as coach of Berretti he won the Category Championship, while in the first team he held the role of assistant coach alongside Elio Gustinetti and qualifying for the Pro League 11th Division Play Off.

On 7 November, following the dismissal of Alessio Pala, he was promoted to the head of the first team of AlbinoLeffe in the Pro League and was sacked after three days due to poor results.

On 29 June 2016, it was announced that he had been appointed as Pro Patria's coach for the 2016-2017 season in the Serie D season. On 14 April 2017, he resigned.

== Honours ==
=== Player ===
==== Individual ====
- Serie D: Leffe 1989-1990
- Serie C: AlbinoLeffe 2001-2002
