= Daniele Morante =

Italian footballer (born 1979)

Personal information
- Date of birth: 4 December 1979 (age 46)
- Place of birth: Rome, Italy
- Height: 1.86 m (6 ft 1 in)
- Position: Forward

Senior career*
| Years | Team | Apps | (Gls) |
| 1996–2000 | Lazio | 0 | (0) |
| 1998 | → Mantova (loan) | 4 | (0) |
| 1999–2000 | → Mantova (loan) | 19 | (1) |
| 2000 | → Lecco (loan) | 12 | (6) |
| 2000–2001 | Treviso | 22 | (2) |
| 2001–2002 | Cosenza | 3 | (0) |
| 2002 | Treviso | 6 | (0) |
| 2002–2003 | Teramo | 12 | (2) |
| 2003 | → AlbinoLeffe (loan) | 13 | (2) |
| 2003–2004 | → Pro Patria (loan) | 20 | (2) |
| 2004–2005 | Prato | 34 | (4) |
| 2005–2006 | Pro Vasto | 28 | (14) |
| 2006–2007 | Sambenedettese | 31 | (18) |
| 2007–2008 | Hellas Verona | 23 | (1) |
| 2008–2011 | Virtus Lanciano | 43 | (7) |
| 2010 | → Rimini (loan) | 10 | (0) |
| 2011 | Fano | 19 | (2) |
| 2012 | Prato | 6 | (1) |
| 2012–2013 | Campobasso | 14 | (3) |
| 2013 | Olympia Agnonese | | |
| 2013–2014 | Civitanovese | | |
- * Club domestic league appearances and goals

Daniele Morante (born 4 December 1979) is an Italian former footballer who played as a forward.

== Career ==
He started his career at Lazio and after finding it difficult to break into the first team Morante went out on loan to a number of clubs. He was released by Lazio in 2000 and he joined Treviso. He has since become a journey man playing for many clubs. In January 2010 he joined Rimini.

In the 2010–11 season he returned to Lanciano but only played in 2010–11 Coppa Italia Lega Pro.
