= Ruben Garlini =

Italian footballer

Personal information
- Date of birth: May 27, 1971 (age 55)
- Place of birth: Bergamo, Italy
- Height: 1.84 m (6 ft 1/2 in)
- Position: Defender

Team information
- Current team: AlbinoLeffe (secretary)

Youth career
- –1990: Atalanta

Senior career*
Years	Team	Apps	(Gls)
1990–1991	U.S.O. Zanica		
1991–1992	Osio Sopra		
1992–1995	U.S. Stezzanese	81	(6)
1995–1996	Lecco	30	(0)
1996–1997	Como	30	(0)
1997–1998	Alzano	21	(0)
1998–2000	Pro Vercelli	56	(2)
2000–2011	AlbinoLeffe	253	(7)
Total		471	(15)

Managerial career
- 2011–2012: AlbinoLeffe (technical collaborator)
- 2018–: AlbinoLeffe (secretary)
- * Club domestic league appearances and goals

Ruben Garlini (born 27 May 1971) is an Italian former footballer.

Garlini spent his youth career with hometown club Atalanta. He left in 1990, without making a senior appearance.

In July 2000, Garlini was signed by Serie C1 side AlbinoLeffe.

He made his Serie B debut in a 2–1 defeat to Atalanta on 14 September 2003.

In summer 2008, Garlini extended his contract through til 30 June 2009.

== Honours ==
Como

- Coppa Italia Serie C: 1996–97

Alzano Virescit

- Coppa Italia Serie C: 1997–98

AlbinoLeffe

- Coppa Italia Serie C: 2001–02
