= Filippo Carobbio =

Italian footballer

Personal information
- Date of birth: 15 October 1979 (age 47)
- Place of birth: Alzano Lombardo, Italy
- Height: 1.85 m (6 ft 1 in)
- Position: Midfielder

Team information
- Current team: RG Ticino (manager)

Senior career*
Years	Team	Apps	(Gls)
1997–2000	Atalanta	0	(0)
1998–1999	→ Alzano (loan)	23	(1)
1999	→ Pistoiese (loan)	1	(0)
2000	→ Avellino (loan)	4	(0)
2000–2002	Varese	49	(5)
2002–2005	AlbinoLeffe	102	(11)
2005–2007	Reggina	32	(0)
2007	Genoa	8	(1)
2007–2009	AlbinoLeffe	73	(11)
2009–2010	Bari	0	(0)
2009–2010	→ Grosseto (loan)	36	(5)
2010–2012	Siena	25	(0)
2011–2012	→ Spezia (loan)	7	(0)

Managerial career
- 2017: Ciliverghe (youth)
- 2017–2020: Ciliverghe
- 2020–2023: Brusaporto
- 2023–: RG Ticino
- * Club domestic league appearances and goals

Filippo Carobbio (born 15 October 1979) is an Italian football manager and a former player who played as a midfielder. He is the manager of Serie D club RG Ticino.

== Football career ==
Carobbio started his career at Atalanta youth team. He was farmed to Serie B and Serie C1 teams, then jointed Varese in co-ownership bid. Carobbio returned to Atalanta in June 2002 but joined AlbinoLeffe immediately.

He followed the team promoted to Serie B in summer 2003. He played his first regular Serie B season, before signed by Serie A team Reggina on 25 August 2005 in joint-ownership bid, for €600,000.

He made his Serie A debut against U.C. Sampdoria, on 11 September 2005.

On 25 January 2007, Genoa C.F.C. signed Carobbio from Reggina for €300,000 in 2 1/2-year contract, he played 8 games for the Serie B third-place winner, before returned to AlbinoLeffe on 22 June 2007 from Genoa for €200,000 in 2-year contract. In August 2007 Genoa also acquired 50% registration rights of Gleison Santos from AlbinoLeffe, for €900,000, made Genoa instead had a net debt of €700,000 to AlbinoLeffe.

=== Bari ===
In June 2009, he left for Serie B champion A.S. Bari for their Serie A campaign on free transfer. But he did not play for Bari in the first three games before he left on loan to Grosseto on 31 August.

=== Siena ===
In July 2010 Carobbio left for Siena along with Pedro Kamata for €500,000 each, in 3-year contract. Both players were part of Abdelkader Ghezzal's deal to Bari (Ghezzal was priced €2.25 million, thus only €1.25 million cash involved). He wore no.14 shirt. The team finished as the runner-up of 2010–11 Serie B and promoted.

In June 2011 the co-ownership deal was terminated. Bari and Siena formed a pure exchange deal, which Nicola Belmonte, Carobbio and Kamata joined Siena outright and Ghezzal moved to Bari outright. In July 2011 he was signed by Spezia Calcio.

=== Italian football scandal ===
On 31 May 2012 (effectively on 18 June 2012) he was suspended for 1 year and 8-month due to involvement in 2011–12 Italian football scandal, which Siena also terminated his contract one year earlier (originally ended on 30 June 2013) backdated to 2011–12 financial year. The ban already after a plea bargain with federal prosecutor. Carobbio had been questioned by the authority on 29 February 2012 and again on 10 July 2012.

On 1 August 2012 Carobbio was banned for 4 more months (already after plea) due to the further investigation from Cremona authority. During the investigations, Carobbio accused Antonio Conte, by-then Siena coach, of failure to report match-fixing, an accusation that would lead to Conte being tried and banned from footballing activities for an eventual sentence of four months. Carobbio's ban was extended again on 3 August 2012 due to the investigation from Bari authority to 26 months (2 more months).

== Honours ==
Spezia

- Supercoppa di Lega di Prima Divisione: 2012
- Lega Pro Prima Divisione: 2012
