= Simone Motta =

Italian footballer

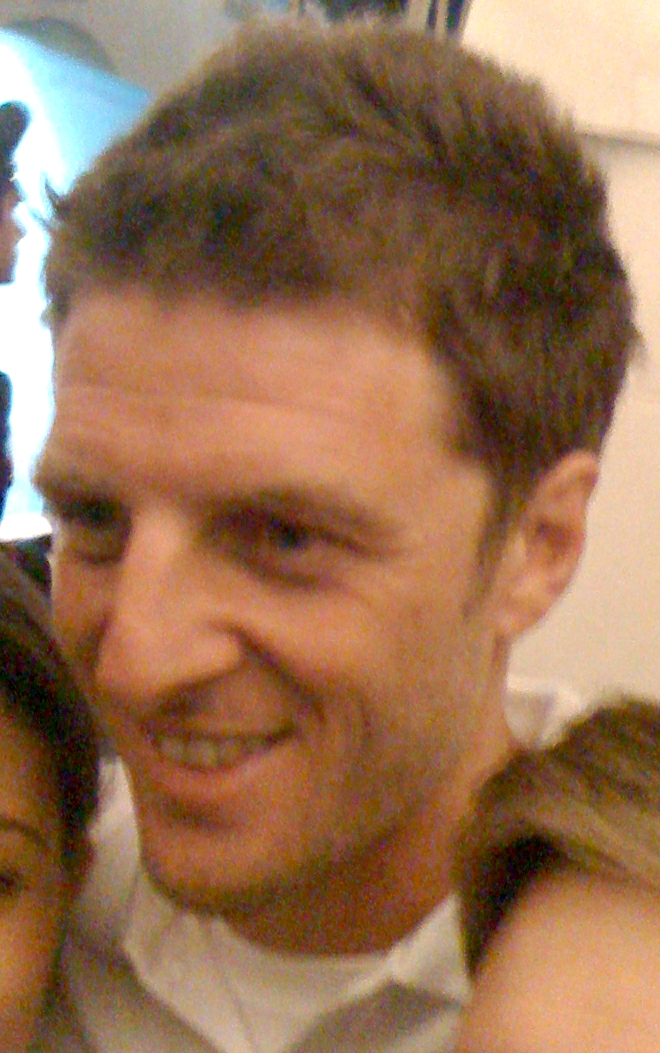

Personal information
- Date of birth: 26 August 1977 (age 49)
- Place of birth: Udine, Italy
- Height: 1.83 m (6 ft 0 in)
- Position: Striker

Team information
- Current team: Pordenone (U19 manager)

Youth career
- Udinese

Senior career*
Years	Team	Apps	(Gls)
1996–1997	Valdagno	29	(2)
1997–2000	Pordenone	65	(25)
1998–1999	→ Santa Lucia (loan)	24	(10)
2000–2002	South Tyrol	55	(30)
2002–2003	Teramo	31	(23)
2003–2006	Bari	52	(6)
2005	→ Ascoli (loan)	12	(1)
2005–2006	→ Rimini (loan)	35	(8)
2006–2008	Pistoiese	65	(28)
2008–2009	Cesena	34	(14)
2009–2013	Novara	80	(23)
2011–2012	→ Triestina (loan)	32	(5)
2013–2014	Tamai	3	(2)
2014–2015	Virtus Corno		
2016–2017	Lumignacco		

Managerial career
- 2014–2015: Virtus Corno (youth)
- 2015–2016: Virtus Corno
- 2017–2018: Pordenone (U19 technical coach)
- 2018: Pordenone (U19)
- 2018–2019: Pordenone (U17)
- 2021–2022: Pordenone (U17)
- 2022–: Pordenone (U19)
- * Club domestic league appearances and goals

Simone Motta (born 26 August 1977) is an Italian football coach and a former player who is the manager of the Under-19 squad of Pordenone.

Motta spent most of his career in Italian lower divisions, scoring 85 goals in Lega Pro Prima Divisione; 32 goals in Lega Pro Seconda Divisione and 23 goals in Serie B. (as of the 2011–12 season)

== Biography ==
=== Early career ===
Born in Udine, Friuli, Motta started his career at Udinese youth team. After a season with Serie C2 team Valdagno, he spent 3 seasons in Serie D. In the 1999–2000 Serie D season, he scored 17 goals and won a contract from Serie C2 team South Tyrol.

He scored an average of 15 goals a season and left for Serie C1 side Teramo in 2002. He scored a career high of 23 goals, and the team entered the promotion playoffs. He scored a goal in the playoff, but the team was eliminated after a 1–1 draw with Martina and had fewer points in the regular season. His goal-scoring ability made him earn a transfer to Serie B club Bari.

=== Bari ===
In July 2003, he left for Serie B club Bari. In the first season, he scored only 3 goals. In 2004–05 Serie B season he lost his starting place and left for fellow Serie B side Ascoli in January 2005, which the team won promotion to Serie A due to Caso Genoa, his greatest achievement so for. He scored a goal for Ascoli, and mainly as a substitute.

In July 2005, he was loaned to newly promoted Serie B club Rimini, which he had to compete with Davide Moscardelli and Sergio Floccari for the strikers role in a 4–4–2 formation until Floccari departed in January. That season, Rimini finished in 17th place, just above the teams that entered relegation play-out.

=== Pistoiese ===
In 2006, he returned to Serie C1 and scored 18 goals for Pistoiese. In the next season, he scored 10 goals and 3 more goals in relegation play-off, helping the team secure a place in 2008–09 Lega Pro Prima Divisione by winning Sangiovannese 4–0.

=== Cesena ===
In August 2008, he was signed by newly relegated Lega Pro Prima Divisione team Cesena for €142,500 in a 2-year contract. He scored 14 league goals with the champion winning side, thus winning a promotion again.

=== Novara ===
In 2009, he remained at Prima Divisione, but for Novara, in exchange with Davide Sinigaglia. Motta was valued €720,000 while Sinigaglia for €500,000. Motta signed a 4-year contract. Partnered with Cristian Bertani, they scored 26 goals and Motta contributed 15 of them as team top-scorer, and won promotion to Serie B as champion. In the next season, Pablo Andrés González and Bertani were the starting forward, which Motta moved to midfielder as attacking midfielder in the 4–3–1–2 formation. He made 34 starts in 2010–11 Serie B.

After a loan to Trieste, Motta signed a new 2-year contract with Novara as the club was relegated from Serie A.

In July 2013 he was released.

=== Serie D ===
On 20 September 2013, Motta joined Tamai.

== Honours ==
- Lega Pro Prima Divisione: 2009 (Cesena), 2010 (Novara)
- Lega Pro Prima Divisione top-scorer (regular season): 2003 (Teramo)
