= Bonatti =

Bonatti is an Italian surname. Notable people with the surname include:

- Andrea Bonatti (born 1984), Italian football coach
- Fernando Bonatti (1894–1974), Italian gymnast
- Guido Bonatti (died c. 1300), Italian astronomer
- Matteo Bonatti (born 1981), Italian footballer
- Roberta Bonatti (born 1997), Italian female boxer and athlete
- Walter Bonatti (1930–2011), Italian mountain climber
