= Mirco Poloni =

Italian footballer

Personal information
- Date of birth: 18 September 1974 (age 52)
- Place of birth: Trescore Balneario, Italy
- Height: 1.75 m (5 ft 9 in)
- Position: Midfielder

Team information
- Current team: AlbinoLeffe (technical assistant)

Senior career*
Years	Team	Apps	(Gls)
1990–1993	Atalanta	2	(0)
1993–1994	Fiorenzuola (loan)	21	(0)
1994–1995	Pergocrema	22	(2)
1995–1996	Alzano Virescit	31	(2)
1996–1997	Solbiatese	37	(3)
1997–1998	Albinese	23	(2)
1998–2010	AlbinoLeffe	307	(10)

International career
1991	Italy U17		
- * Club domestic league appearances and goals

Mirco Poloni (born 18 September 1974 in Trescore Balneario) is an Italian former association footballer.

Poloni made his Serie A debut on 26 May 1991 against A.C. Torino, and is best known for having spent twelve consecutive seasons at AlbinoLeffe, plus one at AlbinoLeffe's predecessor Albinese Calcio, being one of the key players in the club's rise to the Serie B. He retired in June 2010, after more than 300 games with the Celeste, in order to become Emiliano Mondonico's technical assistant at the club.

Poloni capped for Italy U17 at 1991 FIFA U-17 World Championship.
