= Vittorio Micolucci =

Italian footballer

Personal information
- Date of birth: 14 August 1983 (age 43)
- Place of birth: Giulianova, Italy
- Height: 1.80 m (5 ft 11 in)
- Position: Defender

Youth career
- 1999: Giulianova
- 2000–2001: Udinese

Senior career*
Years	Team	Apps	(Gls)
1999	Giulianova	6	(0)
2001–2004	Udinese	1	(0)
2001–2004	→ Pescara (loan)	57	(1)
2004–2007	Bari	89	(0)
2007–2011	Ascoli	128	(1)
Total		381	(2)
- * Club domestic league appearances and goals

Vittorio Micolucci (born 14 August 1983) is an Italian former professional footballer who last played as a defender.

He made his Serie A debut on 14 January 2001 against S.S. Lazio.
