= UC AlbinoLeffe =

Italian football club

AlbinoLeffe
- Full name: Unione Calcio AlbinoLeffe S.r.l.
- Nicknames: La Celeste (The Light-Blue); Seriani (People from Val Seriana); Blucelesti
- Founded: 1998
- Ground: AlbinoLeffe Stadium
- Capacity: 1,791
- Owner: Gianfranco Andreoletti
- Head coach: Marco Zaffaroni
- League: Serie C Group A
- 2025–26: Serie C Group A, 11th of 20
- Website: www.albinoleffe.com
Home colours	Away colours

Unione Calcio AlbinoLeffe is an Italian association football club representing Albino and Leffe, two small towns located in Val Seriana, Lombardy. The club played in Serie B for nine consecutive years and narrowly missed promotion in Serie A at the end of the 2007–08 season. It currently plays in Serie C and has been in the Italian third tier since its relegation in 2011–12.

== History ==
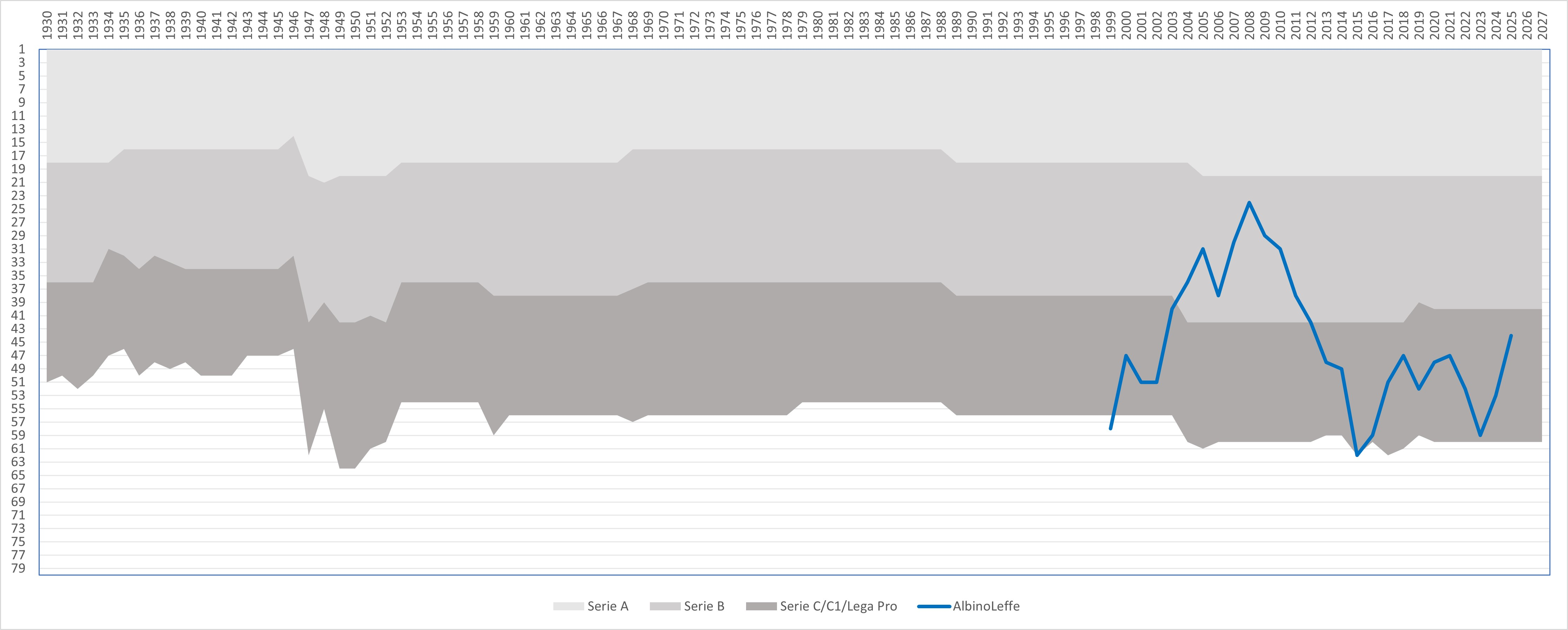
The performance of AlbinoLeffe in the Italian football league structure since the first season of a unified Serie A (1929/30). The club's first season was 1998/99.

The club was created in 1998 as a result of the merger between former Serie C2 (fourth division) teams Albinese Calcio and Società Calcio Leffe, respectively from Albino and Leffe, two neighboring towns. In their first season, the club finished 2nd in the Serie C2 and won a promotion having defeated A.C. Prato in the Girone A Play-offs final. After rising to Serie C1 (the Italian third division), they performed at the middle of the pack, finishing 9th in 2000 and 13th in 2001.

However, in 2002, the Seriani went to the finals of the Coppa Italia Serie C, where they defeated Livorno 2–1 at home before losing 2–3 on the road. They won the tournament on the tiebreaker (most away goals scored). In league play they again finished 13th. In 2003, AlbinoLeffe, under coach Elio Gustinetti, finished second in league play before heading to the promotion play-off. There, they defeated Padua in the semifinals, then had a surprising triumph over Pisa Calcio, which pushed them up to Serie B.

The team moved from the small Martinelli Stadium in Leffe, where they used to play home matches before promotion to Serie B, to the bigger Stadio Atleti Azzurri d'Italia located in Bergamo, the chief-town of the province where both Albino and Leffe are located. Even though AlbinoLeffe was considered to be an outsider in Serie B, which historically includes several former Scudetto winners, the team remarkably managed to avoid relegation in the last two seasons. In 2005–2006, after a great comeback in the second half of the season following the appointment of Emiliano Mondonico as new head coach, Albinoleffe ended the season in eighteenth place and managed to save itself from relegation by prevailing in the playouts against Avellino (score: 2–0, 2–3). The 2006–2007 Serie B campaign, the fourth consecutive for the small Lombard team, ended with a good tenth place, well ahead of the relegation zone.

Historically, AlbinoLeffe's home games have been characterized by very low attendance, as shown by the average 2,400 spectators per game in the 2006–07 season, the most successful in the club history.

With local hero Gustinetti back in charge of the team and despite a lineup composed of relative unknowns, the club's 2007–08 campaign started surprisingly well, with the team leading the Serie B table for a few weeks and arousing the interest of the national media, which began providing regular coverage of the team's games. This has thus far failed to improve the club's low home attendance, however. During the season, AlbinoLeffe confirmed as a potential candidate for direct promotion to Serie A, however a string of poor results, ended with four consecutive home defeats, the final one being a 0–4 loss to Rimini, denied them the chance to achieve a place in the top two, and persuaded club chairman Gianfranco Andreoletti to sack Gustinetti, who then confirmed not to be in good relationships with the chairman, and appoint youth team coach Armando Madonna as caretaker boss for the final regular season match and the following promotion playoffs. Even after a 1–0 loss to Brescia, AlbinoLeffe managed to win at home in the second leg (2–1) and qualified for the final against Lecce. In the first leg they suffered a 1–0 loss. On 15 June, the second match was played in Lecce and its result was 1–1, so AlbinoLeffe did not reach Serie A.

At the end of the 2011–12 season, it was relegated to Lega Pro Prima Divisione after 9 consecutive years in Serie B.

AlbinoLeffe following the systematic match fixing as a club controlled by Singapore-based organized crime was penalized 10 points in the 2012–13 Lega Pro Prima Divisione.

== Stadium and colors ==
From the 2003–04 Serie B season and until 2019, AlbinoLeffe played its home games at the Atleti Azzurri d'Italia stadium in the city of Bergamo. Previously they played in Stadio Carlo Martelli of Leffe.

Following Atalanta's renovation works on the stadium, the club reached a venue sharing agreement with Giana Erminio from the nearby city of Gorgonzola allowing the club to play their home matches for the 2019–20 Serie C season at the Stadio Città di Gorgonzola.

In 2021, the club opened a brand-new stadium in the town of Zanica with a capacity of 1,791 (with possibility of expansion to up to 5,500 in case of a promotion in Serie B) built next to the club's headquarters and training centre; the stadium was formally approved by the Italian National Olympic Committee in March 2019. The stadium makes AlbinoLeffe the first Serie C team to own their home stadium. The inauguration match was played on 21 December 2021, a Serie C league game against Pro Patria.

The club's official colors are dark blue and azure blue, also used for home matches, while the outfit worn by the players for away matches is red and yellow.

== Honours ==
=== Domestic ===
- Coppa Italia Serie C
  - Winners (1): 2001–02
- Serie B
  - Play-off Finals: 2007–08
- Serie C1
  - Runners-up (1): 2002–03
- Serie C2
  - Runners-up (1): 1998–99

== Players ==
=== Current squad ===
As of 11 September 2026

Note: Flags indicate national team as defined under FIFA eligibility rules; some limited exceptions apply. Players may hold more than one non-FIFA nationality.

No.	Pos.	Nation	Player
1	GK	ITA	Filippo Generali
2	DF	ITA	Benedetto Barba
3	DF	ITA	Giacomo Sciacca
4	DF	ITA	Simone Potop
5	MF	ITA	Andrea Mandelli
6	DF	ROU	Gabriele Boloca
7	MF	ITA	Alessandro Garattoni
8	MF	ITA	Alessandro Lombardi
9	FW	ITA	Leonardo Stanzani
10	FW	ITA	Andrea De Paoli
11	FW	ITA	Giacomo Sali
12	GK	ITA	Gabriele Baldi
14	MF	ITA	Simone Sassi
16	MF	ROU	Mihai Gușu
17	MF	ITA	Sevo Ciko
18	FW	ITA	Alessandro Orfei

No.	Pos.	Nation	Player
19	MF	ITA	Mattia Agostinelli
21	MF	ITA	Fabrizio Franchini
22	GK	ITA	Matteo Michielin
23	DF	ITA	Edoardo Sottini
24	MF	ITA	Thomas Simonelli
26	GK	ITA	Marco Taramelli
27	MF	ITA	Diego Ceresoli
32	MF	ITA	Filippo Faggi
33	DF	ITA	Matteo Trapletti
34	DF	ITA	Enrico Bertin
44	MF	ITA	Filippo Delcarro
70	FW	ITA	Jacopo Desogus
71	MF	ITA	Andrea Colombi
77	DF	ITA	Lamine Ballo (on loan from Inter U23)
80	MF	ITA	Tommaso Lupinetti
91	FW	ITA	Nicolò Gamba

=== Out on loan ===
Note: Flags indicate national team as defined under FIFA eligibility rules; some limited exceptions apply. Players may hold more than one non-FIFA nationality.

No.	Pos.	Nation	Player
—	DF	ITA	Giampietro Nikolli (at Villa Valle until 30 June 2027)

== Club officials ==
=== Board of directors ===
As of 1 September 2023

Role	Name
Owner	(Italy) Gianfranco Andreoletti
Board Members	(Italy) Franco Acerbis (Italy) Luciano Zenoni (Italy) Simone Farina (Italy) Adriano Capponi (Italy) Pietro Gelmi
General Manager	(Italy) Simone Farina
Administrative Director	(Italy) Valerio Sacchi
Secretary	(Italy) Ruben Garlini
Ticketing Director	(Italy) Matteo Filosa
Sporting Director	(Italy) Antonio Obbedio
Youth Center Director	(Italy) Marco Malenchini
Youth Center Coordinator	(Italy) Angelo Garlini
Order and Safety Director	(Italy) Marco Colosio
Stadium Manager	(Italy) Ruben Garlini
Scouting Director	(Italy) Roberto Vattiato
Head of Medical Staff	(Italy) Giacomo Poggioli
Team Manager	(Italy) Ivano Peracchi
Press Officer	(Italy) Matteo Viscardi

=== Current technical staff ===
As of 1 September 2023

Role	Name
Head coach	(Italy) Giovanni Lopez
Assistant coach	(Italy) Simone Arceci
Goalkeeping coach	(Italy) Giuseppe Benatelli
Fitness coach	(Italy) Andrea Mossali

== Seasons ==
Season	Div	Pos	League record							Other
			P	W	D	L	F	A	Pts	
1998–99	Serie C2/A	2nd	34	16	10	8	44	35	58	
1999-00	Serie C1/A	9th	34	11	12	11	36	37	45	
2000–01	Serie C1/A	13th	34	7	18	9	27	31	39	
2001–02	Serie C1/A	13th	34	8	17	9	33	35	41	
2002–03	Serie C1/A	2nd	34	17	12	5	62	36	63	
2003–04	Serie B	18th	46	13	15	18	47	59	54	
2004–05	Serie B	11th	38	14	13	15	55	51	55	
2005–06	Serie B	18th	38	10	16	16	38	52	46	
2006–07	Serie B	10th	38	11	20	11	46	48	53	
2007–08	Serie B	4th	38	23	9	10	67	48	78	
2008–09	Serie B	9th	38	15	13	14	49	49	58	
2009–10	Serie B	11th	42	14	13	15	59	56	55	
2010–11	Serie B	18th	42	13	10	19	55	66	49	
2011–12	Serie B	22nd	42	6	12	24	39	60	30	
2012–13	Serie C1/A	6th	32	13	14	5	44	27	47	
2013–14	Serie C1/A	7th	30	12	7	11	42	40	43	
2014–15	Lega Pro/A	20th	38	7	11	20	27	51	32	
2015–16	Lega Pro/A	17th	34	4	8	22	23	57	20	
2016–17	Lega Pro/B	9th	38	12	16	10	38	34	52	
2017–18	Serie C/B	5th	34	13	10	11	36	31	49	
2018–19	Serie C/B	14th	38	9	16	13	31	35	43	
2019–20	Serie C/B	8th	27	10	9	8	29	24	39	
2020–21	Serie C/A	7th	38	14	15	9	43	36	57	

== Notable former players ==
The footballers enlisted below have had international cap(s) for their respective countries at junior and/or senior level and/or a significant number of caps and goals accumulated throughout a certain number of seasons for UC AlbinoLeffe.

- (Italy) Andrea Belotti
- (Italy) Alessandro Diamanti
- (Italy) Federico Marchetti
- (Italy) Federico Peluso
- (Italy) Marco Sau
- (Sierra Leone) Kewullay Conteh
- (Guinea) Karamoko Cissé
- (Finland) Mehmet Hetemaj
- (Latvia) Sergejs Vorobjovs
- (Italy) Mirco Poloni
- (Italy) Ivan Del Prato
- (Italy) Pierre Regonesi
- (Italy) Ruben Garlini
- (Italy) Damiano Sonzogni
- (Italy) Roberto Bonazzi
- (Italy) Marco Cellini
- (Italy) Francesco Ruopolo
- (Italy) Christian Araboni
- (Italy) Filippo Carobbio
- (Italy) Roberto Previtali
- (Italy) Alessandro Salvi
- (Italy) Andrea Soncin
- (Italy) Fabio Gavazzi
- (Romania) Mihai Gușu

== Notable former managers ==
- (Italy) Elio Gustinetti
- (Italy) Emiliano Mondonico
- (Italy) Armando Madonna
- (Italy) Massimiliano Alvini
- (Italy) Marco Zaffaroni
