= List of Italian football transfers summer 2008 (co-ownership) =

This is a list of Italian football transfers for co-ownership resolutions, for the 2008–09 season, from and to Serie A and Serie B.

== Summer transfer window ==
Date	Name	Co-owner club	Mother club	Result	Fee
16 June 2008	Ignazio Abate	Empoli	Milan	Milan	€2M (player swap)
26 June 2008	Elvis Abbruscato	Lecce	Torino	Torino	Blind auction, undisclosed
25 June 2008	Robert Acquafresca	Cagliari	Internazionale	Internazionale	€6M
25 June 2008	Niky Agnorelli	Cuoiopelli	Empoli	Renewed	–
2008-06-24	Enrico Alfonso	Internazionale	Chievo	Renewed	–
2008-06-25	Ilario Aloe	Ravenna	Internazionale	Renewed	–
2008-06-25	Giovanni Amodeo	Teramo	Ascoli	ND (Teramo)	
2008-06-26	Michele Anaclerio	Piacenza	Bari	Piacenza	Blind auction, undisclosed
2008-07-18	Marco Andreolli	Roma	Internazionale	Roma	Free
2008-06-26	Maycol Andriani	Sansovino	Chievo	Chievo	Blind auction, undisclosed
2008-06-24	Filippo Antonelli	Triestina	Chievo	Triestina	Free
2008-06-09	Luca Antonini	Empoli	Milan	Milan	€2.75M (player swap)
2008-06-25	Giuseppe Aquino	Cavese	Frosinone	ND (Cavese)	
2008-06-19	Ivan Artipoli	Lazio	Sampdoria	ND (Lazio)	
2008-06-25	Mario Artistico	Cisco Roma	Udinese	ND (Cisco Roma)	
25 June 2008	Salvatore Aurelio	Cesena	Genoa	Genoa	€1,000
2008-06-25	Eros Bagnara	Pizzighettone	Treviso	ND (Pizzighettone)	
2008-06-26	Ivano Baldanzeddu	Avellino	Empoli	Empoli	Blind auction, undisclosed
26 June 2008	Nicola Barasso	Taranto	Genoa	Taranto	Blind auction
2008-06-24	Ahmed Barusso (Ghana)	Roma	Rimini	Renewed	–
2008-06-25	Eder Baù	Padova	Spezia	Renewed	–
25 June 2008	Manuel Benetti	Bassano	Treviso	Treviso	Undisclosed
2008-06-18	Marco Bernacci	Ascoli	Cesena	Ascoli	Undisclosed
2008-06-26	Saša Bjelanović	Torino	Ascoli	Torino	Blind auction, undisclosed
2008-06-13	Manuele Blasi	Napoli	Juventus	Napoli	€2.6M
19 June 2008	Antonio Bocchetti	Frosinone	Parma	Frosinone	€250,000
2008-06-16	Salvatore Bocchetti	Frosinone	Ascoli	Frosinone	Undisclosed
25 June 2008	Matteo Bonatti	Lucchese	Empoli	Renewed	
2008-06-24	Leonardo Bonucci	Treviso	Internazionale	Internazionale	Undisclosed
2008-06-04	Marco Borriello	Genoa	Milan	Milan	€10M
2008-06-26	Andrea Bovo	Padova	Palermo	Padova	Blind auction, €0.426M
2008-06-19	Cesare Bovo	Genoa	Palermo	Palermo	€5M
2008-06-24	Yuri Breviario	Monza	Chievo	Monza	Undisclosed
2008-06-25	Salvatore Bruno	Modena	Chievo	Modena	Undisclosed
2008-06-19	Igor Budan (Croatia)	Parma	Palermo	Palermo	€4.5M
2008-06-26	Daniele Cacia	Fiorentina	Piacenza	Piacenza	Blind auction, €2.8M
2008-06-18	Giampaolo Calzi	Ravenna	Sampdoria	Renewed	–
2008-06-19	Edgar Çani	Palermo	Pescara	Palermo	€0.45M
2008-06-25	Francesco Carbone	Avellino	Chievo	Avellino	Undisclosed
25 June 2008	Davide Carcuro	Fiorentina	Treviso	Renewed	
24 June 2008	Davide Caremi	AlbinoLeffe	Chievo	AlbinoLeffe	Free
2008-06-24	Alfredo Cariello	Frosinone	Chievo	Frosinone	Undisclosed
2008-06-25	Matteo Cavagna	Ravenna	Juventus	Renewed	–
2008-06-04	Luca Ceccarelli	Internazionale	Milan	Milan	Undisclosed
2008-06-24	Lorenzo Cecchi	Prato	Chievo	Renewed	
2008-06-27	Andrea Cesaro	Salernitana	Celano	Celano	Blind auction, undisclosed
2008-06-24	Michael Cia	Atalanta	Südtirol	Renewed	
	Corrado Colombo	Pisa	Sampdoria	ND (Pisa)	Free
25 June 2008	Roberto Colussi	Sassuolo	Salernitana	ND (Sassuolo)	Free
2008-06-24	Alex Cordaz	Treviso	Internazionale	Renewed	
2008-06-24	Luca Corradi	Venezia	Chievo	Venezia	Undisclosed
25 June 2008	Marco Dalla Costa	Pro Sesto	Milano	Renewed	
2008-06-19	Tomas Danilevičius	Bologna	Livorno	Livorno	Undisclosed
2008-06-09	Paolo De Ceglie	Siena	Juventus	Juventus	Undisclosed
2008-06-24	Andrea De Falco	Taranto	Chievo	Chievo	Undisclosed
2008-06-23	Sebastian De Maio	Celano	Brescia	Brescia	Undisclosed
2008-06-18	Luigi Della Rocca	Triestina	Bologna	Renewed	
2008-06-25	Nicolas Desenclos	Internazionale	Triestina	Renewed	
2008-07-11	Marco Di Fatta	Sansovino	Catania	Catania	Undisclosed
2008-06-19	Luca Di Matteo	Palermo	Pescara	Palermo	€0.45M
2008-06-26	Mahamet Diagouraga (Mali)	Massese	Chievo	Chievo	Blind auction, undisclosed
2008-06-14	Morris Donati	Sampdoria	Brescia	Renewed	
18 June 2008	Renato Dossena	Rovigo	Empoli	Empoli	Undisclosed
25 June 2008	Isah Eliakwu (Nigeria)	Triestina	Internazionale	Triestina	€1,000
26 June 2008	Domenico Falco	Massese	Ascoli	Ascoli	Auction, undisclosed
2008-06-24	Ivan Fatić (Montenegro)	Internazionale	Chievo	Renewed	
2008-06-25	Dino Fava	Bologna	Treviso	Treviso	Undisclosed
	Carlo Ferrario	Prato	Chievo	Renewed	
2008-06-25	Antonio Floro Flores	Udinese	Arezzo	Udinese	Undisclosed
26 June 2008	Gianluca Freddi	Grosseto	Roma	Grosseto	Auction, ~€65,000
25 June 2008	Fernando Forestieri	Siena	Genoa	Genoa	€4.5M
2008-06-24	Jacopo Fortunato	Internazionale	Treviso	Renewed	
2008-06-25	Salvatore Foti	Udinese	Sampdoria	Renewed	
24 June 2008	William Jidayi	Sassuolo	Modena	Sassuolo	Undisclosed
25 June 2008	Daniele Galloppa	Siena	Roma	Siena	€1.75M (player exchange)
25 June 2008	Carlo Gervasoni	AlbinoLeffe	Verona	AlbinoLeffe	€95,000
2008-06-24	Salvatore Giardina	Portogruaro	Chievo	Portogruaro	Undisclosed
24 June 2008	Sebastiano Girelli	Sassuolo	Modena	Sassuolo	Undisclosed
23 June 2008	Simone Gozzi	Modena	Reggiana	Modena	Undisclosed
25 June 2008	Mattia Graffiedi	Triestina	Milan	Triestina	€1,000
2008-06-25	Tomás Guzmán (Paraguay)	Piacenza	Juventus	Renewed	
2008-06-26	Angelo Iorio	Piacenza	Cremonese	Piacenza	Blind auction, undisclosed
2008-06-24	Antimo Iunco	Chievo	Verona	Chievo	Undisclosed
2008-06-19	Ikechukwu Kalu (Nigeria)	Milan	Sampdoria	Sampdoria	Undisclosed
2008-06-24	Emiliano Landolina	Prato	Chievo	Prato	Undisclosed
25 June 2008	Simon Laner	Pro Sesto	AlbinoLeffe	Renewed	–
2008-06-19	Massimo Loviso	Livorno	Bologna	Livorno	Undisclosed
	Andrea Luci	Ascoli	Juventus	Ascoli	Blind auction, €103,000
2008-06-24	Daniel Maa Boumsong (Cameroon)	Treviso	Internazionale	Renewed	–
2008-06-14	Christian Maggio	Sampdoria	Fiorentina	Sampdoria	Undisclosed
2008-06-24	Marco Mallus	Reggiana	Treviso	Reggiana	Undisclosed
2008-06-09	Lino Marzoratti	Empoli	Milan	Empoli	€1.5M (player swap)
25 June 2008	Salvatore Masiello	Udinese	Palermo	ND (Udinese)	Free
2008-06-25	Mattia Masiero	Torino	Ancona	Renewed	
2008-06-03	Alessandro Matri	Cagliari	Milan	Cagliari	€2M
2008-06-19	Davide Matteini	Parma	Palermo	Renewed	
2008-06-25	Riccardo Meggiorini	Cittadella	Internazionale	Renewed	
2008-06-19	Mourad Meghni	Lazio	Bologna	Renewed	
	Federico Melchiorri	Sambenedettese	Siena	Renewed	
2008-06-25	Andrea Mengoni	Avellino	Chievo	Chievo	Undisclosed
2008-06-25	Leonardo Migliónico (Uruguay)	Sampdoria	Piacenza	Renewed	
2008-06-24	Gionata Mingozzi	Treviso	Sampdoria	Renewed	
25 June 2008	Davide Moscardelli	Cesena	Rimini	Rimini	€550,000
2008-06-14	Mattia Mustacchio	Sampdoria	Brescia	Renewed	
2008-06-26	Marcus N'Ze	Sansovino	Chievo	Chievo	Blind auction, undisclosed
2008-06-25	Devis Nossa	Pro Patria	Internazionale	ND (Pro Patria)	
2008-06-26	Giuseppe Nuvoli	Nuorese	Chievo	Nuorese	Blind auction, undisclosed
25 June 2008	Douglas Packer (Brazil)	Siena	Juventus	ND (Siena)	
2008-06-24	Matteo Paro	Genoa	Juventus	Genoa	€2M
2008-07-04	Marco Parolo	Foligno	Chievo	Chievo	Undisclosed
2008-06-24	Marco Petresini	Pavia	Chievo	Chievo	Undisclosed
25 June 2008	Marco Piccinni	Noicattaro	Bari	Renewed	
2008-06-10	Felice Piccolo	Empoli	Juventus	Empoli	€0.3M
25 June 2008	Mirko Pieri	Sampdoria	Udinese	Sampdoria	€500,000
2008-06-24	Federico Piovaccari	Treviso	Internazionale	Renewed	
2008-06-24	Renato Piovezan	Prato	Chievo	Chievo	Undisclosed
25 June 2008	Stefano Procida	Napoli	Torino	Renewed	
2008-06-16	Nicola Pozzi	Empoli	Milan	Empoli	€3.25M (player swap)
25 June 2008	Andrea Rabito	Padova	AlbinoLeffe	Renewed	–
25 June 2008	Pierre Giorgio Regonesi	Rimini	AlbinoLeffe	Rimini	€900,000
25 June 2008	Francesco Renzetti	Lucchese	Genoa	Genoa	€600,000
24 June 2008	Luca Rigoni	Chievo	Vicenza	Renewed	–
25 June 2008	Giuseppe Rizza	Juve Stabia	Juventus	Juventus	€50,000
9 June 2008	Andrea Rossi	Siena	Juventus	Siena	€1M
	Xhulian Rrudho (Albania)	Sansovino	Chievo	ND	
2008-06-10	Matteo Rubin	Torino	Cittadella	Torino	Undisclosed
2008-06-20	Francesco Ruopolo	AlbinoLeffe	Parma	AlbinoLeffe	Undisclosed
2008-06-26	Mario Salgado (Chile)	Avellino	Foggia	Foggia	Blind auction, undisclosed
2008-06-10	Paolo Sammarco	Sampdoria	Milan	Sampdoria	Undisclosed
2008-06-25	Gleison Santos (Brazil)	Genoa	AlbinoLeffe	Renewed	
	Antonino Saviano	Sansovino	Chievo	ND	
2008-06-25	Pasquale Schiattarella	Ancona	Torino	Renewed	
2008-06-26	Giuseppe Scurto	Treviso	Chievo	Treviso	Blind auction, undisclosed
25 June 2008	Jaroslav Šedivec	Triestina	Crotone	Triestina	€100,000
25 June 2008	Guilherme Siqueira	Udinese	Internazionale	Renewed	
	Luca Spinetti	Sansovino	Chievo	ND	
18 June 2008	Luca Tedeschi	Treviso	Bologna	Renewed	
25 June 2008	Antonio Tedesco	Gela	Catania	Gela	Undisclosed
25 June 2008	Matteo Trini	Juve Stabia	Juventus	Juventus	€5,000
24 June 2008	Gennaro Troianiello	Frosinone	Chievo	Renewed	
25 June 2008	Michele Troiano	Chievo	Modena	Modena	Undisclosed
18 June 2008	Robson Toledo (Brazil)	Ravenna	Udinese	Renewed	
13 June 2008	Ronny Diuk Toma	Internazionale	Milan	Internazionale	€150,000
25 June 2008	Alessandro Tulli	Piacenza	Lecce	Renewed	
24 June 2008	Anthony Vanden Borre	Genoa	Fiorentina	Genoa	€1.7M
13 June 2008	Marco Varaldi	Milan	Internazionale	Milan	€50,000
25 June 2008	Ricardo Matias Verón	Siena	Reggina	ND (Siena)	
25 June 2008	Alessandro Vinci	Melfi	Empoli	Empoli	Undisclosed
25 June 2008	Emanuele Volpara	Lucchese	Genoa	ND (Lucchese)	
10 June 2008	Rej Volpato	Empoli	Juventus	Juventus	€400,000
26 June 2008	Alessandro Volpe	Olbia	Empoli	Olbia	Auction, undisclosed
25 June 2008	Massimo Volta	Sampdoria	Parma	Renewed	
20 June 2008	Mirko Vučinić (Montenegro)	Roma	Lecce	Roma	€12M
24 June 2008	Papa Waigo (Senegal)	Fiorentina	Genoa	Renewed	
13 June 2008	Marcelo Zalayeta (Uruguay)	Napoli	Juventus	Renewed	
26 June 2008	Pietro Zammuto	Piacenza	Juventus	Piacenza	€170,000
25 June 2008	Giacomo Zappacosta	Fiorentina	Pescara	Renewed	
26 June 2008	Gianpietro Zecchin	Grosseto	Padova	Grosseto	Auction, undisclosed

- ND – These players' contract with mother club has terminated and they are free to join co-owner club.

== See also ==
- List of Italian football transfers Summer 2008
