= List of Italian football transfers winter 2006–07 =

== Winter transfer window ==
Date	Name	Moving from	Moving to	Fee
5 January 2007	Stefano Argilli	Livorno	Frosinone	Undisclosed
5 January 2007	Gianluca Comotto	Roma	Torino	Co-ownership, €1.05 million
6 January 2007	Tomas Danilevičius	Livorno	Bologna	Co-ownership, undisclosed
6 January 2007	Carmine Coppola	Messina	Livorno	Loan
7 January 2007	Luigi Di Biagio	La Storta (amateur)	Ascoli	Free
8 January 2007	Leandro Grimi (Italy) (Argentina)	(Argentina) Racing	Milan	€2.57M
8 January 2007	Andrea Giallombardo	Livorno	Messina	Loan
9 January 2007	Matteo Melara	Torino	Ascoli	Loan
10 January 2007	Leandro Vitiello	Vicenza	Ascoli	Co-ownership, undisclosed
10 January 2007	Martin Bergvold	(Denmark) Copenhagen	Livorno	Undisclosed
10 January 2007	Luca Bonfiglio	Internazionale (youth)	Voghera	Loan
10 January 2007	Matteo Abbate	Piacenza	Ancona	Loan
10 January 2007	Ciro Danucci	Catania	Cesena	Co-ownership, €30,000
11 January 2007	Fabrizio Grillo	Roma	Sambenedettese	Loan
11 January 2007	Massimo Bonanni	Sampdoria	Ascoli	Undisclosed
11 January 2007	Niccolò Rosso	Piacenza (youth)	Livorno (youth)	Undisclosed
11 January 2007	Matteo Cavagna	Foligno	Arezzo	Co-ownership, undisclosed
12 January 2007	Guilherme do Prado (Brazil)	Fiorentina	Spezia	Loan
12 January 2007	Michele Troiano	Modena	Chievo	Co-ownership, undisclosed
12 January 2007	Salvatore Bruno	Chievo	Modena	Co-ownership, undisclosed
14 January 2007	Bogdan Lobonţ	Fiorentina	(Romania) Dinamo Bucharest	Undisclosed
16 January 2007	Massimiliano Pesenti	AlbinoLeffe	Prato	Loan
16 January 2007	Julio César de León (Honduras)	Reggina	Genoa	€3.2M
16 January 2007	Filippo Carobbio	Reggina	Genoa	Undisclosed (co-owned with AlbinoLeffe)
17 January 2007	Matteo Prandelli	Montichiari	Siena	Loan
17 January 2007	Nello Russo	Crotone (on loan at Spezia)	Pescara	Loan
17 January 2007	Antonio Luis Jiménez (Chile)	Ternana	Lazio	Loan
17 January 2007	Marco Storari	Messina	Milan	€1.2M
17 January 2007	Luca Vigiani	Reggina	Livorno	Undisclosed
18 January 2007	Dario Biasi	Genoa	Verona	Loan
19 January 2007	Andrea Peana	Cagliari	Triestina	Loan
19 January 2007	Davide Marchini	Triestina	Cagliari	Loan
21 January 2007	César Prates (Brazil)	Livorno	Chievo	Undisclosed
21 January 2007	Andrea Bovo	Palermo (at Bari, t)	Padova	Loan
21 January 2007	Giuseppe Anaclerio	Frosinone	Padova	Undisclosed
22 January 2007	Mirko Cudini	Ascoli	Vicenza	Free
22 January 2007	Rincón (Brazil)	Empoli	Internazionale (remains at Empoli, t)	Undisclosed
22 January 2007	Vitangelo Spadavecchia	Bari (at Pescara, t)	Catania	Loan
22 January 2007	Ciro Polito	Catania	Pescara	Loan
22 January 2007	Massimo Volta	Carpenedolo	Sampdoria (remains at Carpenedolo, t)	Co-ownership, €0.2M
24 January 2007	Alberto Quadri	Internazionale	Lazio	Free (Note: The player also on loan to his new club during the season, the deal turned the deal from temporary to definitive.)
24 January 2007	Alberto Quadri	Lazio	Spezia	Loan
24 January 2007	Massimo Oddo	Lazio	Milan	€10.75M
24 January 2007	Pasquale Foggia	Milan	Lazio	€3M
24 January 2007	Pasquale Foggia	Lazio	Reggina	Loan, €0.25M
24 January 2007	Lucas Correa	Lanciano	Lazio	€0.5M
25 January 2007	Erminio Rullo	Lecce	Napoli	€1.5M
25 January 2007	Marcello Cottafava	Treviso	Lecce	Co-ownership, €100,000
25 January 2007	Blažej Vaščák	Treviso	Lecce	Co-ownership, €600,000
25 January 2007	Alberto Giuliatto	Treviso	Lecce	Co-ownership, €1.3M
25 January 2007	Alfonso Camorani	Lecce	Treviso	Co-ownership, €500
25 January 2007	Martin Petráš	Lecce	Treviso	Loan
25 January 2007	César (Brazil)	Internazionale (at Corinthians, t)	Livorno	Loan
25 January 2007	Domenico Criscito	Genoa	Juventus (at Genoa, t)	Co-ownership resolution, €7.5M
25 January 2007	Abdoulay Konko	Juventus (at Siena ,c)	Genoa (at Siena ,c)	€1M (transfer of co-ownership)
25 January 2007	Andrea Masiello	Juventus (at Siena ,c)	Genoa (at Siena ,c)	€1.25M (transfer of co-ownership)
25 January 2007	Ibrahima Bakayoko (Note: The player also holds French nationality.)	Livorno	Messina	Undisclosed
25 January 2007	Nicola Corrent	Ternana	Verona	Undisclosed
25 January 2007	Dmitry Yakovlevsky (Note: The player also holds Belgian nationality.)	Red Star Waasland (Belgium)	Verona	Undisclosed
26 January 2007	Cristiano Coccia	Lazio (youth)	Frosinone (youth)	Loan
26 January 2007	Salvatore Mastronunzio	Frosinone	Foggia	Loan
27 January 2007	Andrea Soncin	Atalanta	Ascoli	Loan
27 January 2007	Luis Fernando Centi	Atalanta	Ascoli	Undisclosed
29 January 2007	Giuseppe Cozzolino	Lecce	Chievo	Co-ownership, €300,000
29 January 2007	Corrado Colombo	Brescia	Spezia	Co-ownership, €500
30 January 2007	Radosław Matusiak	(Poland) Bełchatów	Palermo	Undisclosed
30 January 2007	Zdravko Kuzmanović (Serbia) (Switzerland)	Basel (Switzerland)	Fiorentina	Undisclosed
30 January 2007	Domenico Falco	Foligno	Ascoli	Co-ownership resolution
30 January 2007	Ivano Rotoli	Spezia	Monza	Loan
30 January 2007	Dario Bergamelli	Atalanta (at Salernitana, t)	Monza	Loan
30 January 2007	Andrea Gentile	Messina (on loan at Crotone)	Monza	Loan
30 January 2007	Vinicio Espinal (Dominican Republic)	Monza	Crotone	Undisclosed
30 January 2007	Filippo Fedeli	Pisa	Empoli	Undisclosed
30 January 2007	Filippo Fedeli	Empoli	Olbia	Loan
31 January 2007	Fabio Pecchia	Ascoli	Foggia	Free
31 January 2007	Andrea Cocco	Cagliari	Venezia	Loan
31 January 2007	Sodinha (Brazil)	Campo Grande (Brazil)	Udinese	Loan
31 January 2007	Xhulian Rrudho (Albania)	Ancona	Chievo	Undisclosed
31 January 2007	Ettore Marchi	Gubbio	Triestina	Undisclosed
31 January 2007	Ettore Marchi	Triestina	Gubbio	Loan
31 January 2007	Marco Pomante	Pescara	Ravenna	Loan
31 January 2007	Edinson Cavani	Danubio (Uruguay)	Palermo	Undisclosed
31 January 2007	Cesare Bovo	Palermo	Torino	Loan
31 January 2007	Guillermo Giacomazzi	Lecce	Palermo	Loan
31 January 2007	Gianni Munari	Palermo	Lecce	Loan
31 January 2007	Francesco Parravicini	Palermo	Parma	Loan
31 January 2007	Tommaso Berni	Ternana	Lazio	€1.5M
31 January 2007	Lucas Correa	Lazio	Lucchese	Loan
31 January 2007	Cristiano Gimelli	Lazio	Lanciano	Co-ownership, €500
31 January 2007	Matteo Merini	Bari	Lazio	Undisclosed
31 January 2007	Luis Pedro Cavanda	(Belgium) Standard Liège	Lazio (youth)	Loan
31 January 2007	Alessio Arfè	Siena	Val di Sangro	Undisclosed
31 January 2007	Daniel Maa Boumsong (Cameroon)	Internazionale	Treviso	Co-ownership, undisclosed
31 January 2007	Daniel Maa Boumsong	Treviso	Internazionale	Loan
31 January 2007	Leonardo Bonucci	Internazionale	Treviso	Co-ownership, undisclosed
31 January 2007	Leonardo Bonucci	Treviso	Internazionale	Loan
31 January 2007	Francesco Coco	Internazionale	Torino	Loan
31 January 2007	Ronaldo (Brazil) (Spain)	(Spain) Real Madrid	Milan	€8.05M
31 January 2007	Matteo Crobeddu	Cagliari	Arezzo	Undisclosed
31 January 2007	Mirco Gasparetto	Genoa	Chievo	Loan
31 January 2007	Alex Costa (Brazil)	(Bulgaria) Lokomotiv Plovdiv	Fiorentina (youth)	Loan
31 January 2007	Davide Carcuro	Treviso	Fiorentina (youth)	Co-ownership, €1M
31 January 2007	Stefano Fiore	(Spain) Valencia	Livorno	Loan
31 January 2007	Stefano Lombardi	Arezzo	Ascoli	Undisclosed
31 January 2007	Vito Di Bari	Frosinone	Martina	Loan
31 January 2007	Angelo Pagotto	Grosseto	Crotone	Loan
31 January 2007	Filippo Savi	Parma	Monza	Loan
31 January 2007	Babu (Brazil)	Lecce	Verona	Loan
31 January 2007	Luigi Anaclerio	Verona	Perugia	Loan
31 January 2007	Gianluca Di Giulio	Verona	Gallipoli	Loan
31 January 2007	Ivan Castiglia	Reggina	Vicenza	Loan
	Franco Da Dalt	Triestina	Varese	Loan
	Luis Maria Alfageme (Argentina)	Brescia	Cremonese	Loan
	Alex Pederzoli	Juventus	Manfredonia	Loan
	Lorenzo Burzigotti	Arezzo	Juve Stabia	Loan
	Matteo Momentè	Internazionale (on loan at Sambenedettese)	Venezia	Co-ownership, undisclosed
	Tijani Belaid	Internazionale (youth)	(Netherlands) PSV	Loan
	Sandro Bloudek	Milan (on loan at Pistoiese)	Cremonese	Loan
	Vincenzo Pellecchia	Empoli	Perugia	Loan
	Daniele Buzzegoli	Empoli	Pisa	Loan
	Leandro Vitiello	Ascoli (co-owned with Vicenza)	Cremonese	Loan
	Domenico Falco	Ascoli	Massese	Co-ownership, undisclosed
	Stefano Garzon	Chievo	Avellino	Loan
	Luca Anania	Lecce (on loan at Grosseto)	Pavia	Loan
	Fabio Romeo	Lecce (youth)	Giacomense (amateur)	Loan
	Umberto Improta	Triestina (on loan at Salernitana)	Lanciano	Loan
	Daniele Simoncelli	Brescia (youth)	Rodengo (amateur)	Loan
	Giovanni Orfei	Torino	Salernitana	

=== Out of window transfer ===
Date	Name	Nat	Moving from	Moving to	Fee
2 February 2007	Fabio Vignaroli	Italy	Unattached	Bari	Free
6 March 2007	Davide Zomer	Italy	Unattached (Siena)	Ancona	Free
