= Anaclerio =

Anaclerio is an Italian surname. Notable people with the surname include:

- Luigi Anaclerio (born 1981), Italian footballer
- Michele Anaclerio (born 1982), Italian footballer
