= Crocetti =

Crocetti is an Italian surname. Notable people with the surname include:

- Dino Paul Crocetti, best known as Dean Martin (1917–1995), American singer, actor, comedian, and film producer
- Lorenzo Crocetti (born 1983), Italian footballer
- Venanzo Crocetti (1913–2003), Italian sculptor
