= Leonardo Moracci =

Italian footballer

Personal information
- Date of birth: 22 August 1987 (age 39)
- Place of birth: Todi, Italy
- Height: 1.85 m (6 ft 1 in)
- Position: Centre back

Team information
- Current team: ASD Cannara

Youth career
- 2003–2004: Todi
- 2004–2006: Chievo

Senior career*
Years	Team	Apps	(Gls)
2006–2008	Chievo	0	(0)
2006–2007	→ Pro Belvedere (loan)	28	(2)
2007–2008	→ Sansovino (loan)	13	(1)
2008–2009	Verona	24	(0)
2009–2010	Chievo	0	(0)
2010	Alessandria	4	(0)
2010–2011	Lecco	27	(3)
2011–2012	Todi	19	(5)
2012–2013	Portogruaro	31	(2)
2013–2014	Castel Rigone	28	(2)
2014–2015	Paganese	33	(2)
2015–2016	Ischia Isolaverde	29	(2)
2016–2017	Pomigliano	32	(5)
2017	Cassino	12	(2)
2017–2018	Flaminia	17	(0)
2018–2019	ACD Sangiustese	26	(0)
2019	Montevarchi Aquila	11	(0)
2019–	ASD Cannara	3	(0)

International career
2004	Italy U18	1	(0)
- * Club domestic league appearances and goals as of 16:30, 12 January 2020 (UTC)

Leonardo Moracci (born 22 August 1987) is an Italian footballer who plays for Serie D club ASD Cannara.

== Biography ==
Born in Todi, Umbria, central Italy, Moracci started his career at hometown club Todi at Serie D where the team relegated in 2004. In August 2004 he was signed by northern Italy side Chievo. In 2006–07 season he left on loan to Serie D side Pro Belvedere Vercelli then Serie C2 side Sansovino (along with Marcus N'Ze, Xhulian Rrudho, Antonino Saviano, Luca Spinetti and Maycol Andriani). But he was returned in January 2008 and played for Primavera team as overage player.

In 2008–09 season, he left for Lega Pro Prima Divisione side Hellas Verona F.C. (and cross-town rival) in co-ownership deal (along with Stefano Garzon, Marco Parolo and Domenico Girardi who went on loan) but bought back along with Parolo in June 2009.

He trained with Chievo's Primavera U20 team and was not offered a number in the first team at the first half of the 2009–10 season. In January 2010, he left for Alessandria of Prima Divisione in another co-ownership deal.

In June 2010 Chievo bought back Moracci for a peppercorn fee of €500 and re-sold him to Lecco for free, re-joining Tommaso Chiecchi who sold to Lecco a month earlier.

After a season with the amateur hometown club, he was signed by Portogruaro and was in the pre-season camp.
