= Cudini =

Cudini is a surname. Notable people with the surname include:

- Alain Cudini (born 1946), French racing driver
- Mirko Cudini (born 1973), Italian footballer
