= 2007–08 Spezia Calcio season =

Spezia
2007–08 season
- President: Giuseppe Ruggieri
- Head coach: Antonio Soda
- Stadium: Stadio Alberto Picco
- Serie B: 21st (demoted)
- Coppa Italia: Round 1
- Top goalscorer: League: Massimiliano Guidetti (14); All: Massimiliano Guidetti (14)
- Average home league attendance: 6,497
- Biggest win: Spezia 3–0 Frosinone; Spezia 5–2 Treviso
- Biggest defeat: Chievo 5–0 Spezia

The 2007–08 Spezia Calcio season was the club's 102nd season in existence and the club's second consecutive in the second division of Italian football. In addition to the domestic league, Spezia participated in this season's edition of the Coppa Italia.

The 2007–2008 season saw Spezia rank 21st in the Serie B standings, with consequent relegation to the newly formed Lega Pro Prima Divisione. Spezia was eliminated in the first round of the Italian Cup, due to the 2–0 defeat suffered on 14 August on the neutral ground in Fiorenzuola against Piacenza.

== Competitions ==
=== Overview ===
Competition	First match	Last match	Starting round	Final position	Record							
Competition	First match	Last match	Starting round	Final position	Pld	W	D	L	GF	GA	GD	Win %
Serie B	25 August 2007	1 June 2008	Matchday 1	21st	42	6	16	20	45	66	−21	14.29
Coppa Italia	14 August 2007		Round 1	Round 1	1	0	0	1	0	2	−2	0.00
Total					43	6	16	21	45	68	−23	13.95

Source: Competitions

=== Serie B ===
==== League table ====
Pos	Team	Pld	W	D	L	GF	GA	GD	Pts	Promotion or relegation
18	Treviso	42	11	12	19	41	52	−11	45	
19	Avellino (T)	42	8	12	22	42	64	−22	36	Spared from relegation (Note: Initially, no relegation playoffs held as Treviso was more than 4 points clear of 4th-last place. Subsequently Avellino readmitted into Serie B in place of Messina.)
20	Ravenna (R)	42	8	11	23	48	75	−27	35	Relegation to Lega Pro 1ªDiv
21	Spezia (Note: 1 point deducted for late tax payment. Subsequently placed in Serie D for financial problems.) (E, R, E, R)	42	6	16	20	45	66	−21	33	Relegation to Serie D
22	Cesena (R)	42	5	17	20	37	66	−29	32	Relegation to Lega Pro 1ªDiv

Source: Panini
Rules for classification: 1) points; 2) head-to-head points; 3) head-to-head goal difference; 4) head-to-head goals scored; 5) goal difference; 6) number of goals scored.
(E) Eliminated; (R) Relegated; (T) Qualified, but not yet for the particular phase indicated

==== Results summary ====
Overall								Home						Away					
Pld	W	D	L	GF	GA	GD	Pts	W	D	L	GF	GA	GD	W	D	L	GF	GA	GD
42	6	16	20	45	66	−21	34	6	7	8	25	25	0	0	9	12	20	41	−21

==== Results by round ====
Round	1	2	3	4	5	6	7	8	9	10	11	12	13	14	15	16	17	18	19	20	21	22	23	24	25	26	27	28	29	30	31	32	33	34	35	36	37	38	39	40	41	42
Ground	A	H	A	H	A	H	A	H	A	H	A	H	A	H	A	A	H	H	A	H	A	H	A	H	A	H	A	H	A	H	A	H	A	H	A	H	H	A	A	H	A	H
Result	L	L	D	L	L	W	L	W	D	L	D	W	D	D	D	D	L	W	L	L	L	L	L	D	D	D	L	L	D	D	L	D	L	W	L	W	D	L	D	L	L	D
Position	16	20	18	21	22	19	21	18	19	19	19	17	16	17	17	17	17	17	17	18	19	19	20	19	20	19	20	20	19	20	21	21	21	20	20	19	19	20	21	21	21	21

A = Away; H = Home; W = Win; D = Draw; L = Loss

==== Matches ====
25 August 2007 1	AlbinoLeffe	3–2	Spezia	Bergamo
CEST (UTC+2)

3 September 2007 2	Spezia	0–2	Bologna	La Spezia
CEST (UTC+2)				Stadium: Stadio Alberto Picco

9 September 2007 3	Modena	2–2	Spezia	Modena
CEST (UTC+2)				Stadium: Stadio Alberto Braglia

15 September 2007 4	Spezia	0–1	Triestina	La Spezia
CEST (UTC+2)				Stadium: Stadio Alberto Picco

22 September 2007 5	Ascoli	1–0	Spezia	Ascoli Piceno
CEST (UTC+2)				Stadium: Stadio Cino e Lillo Del Duca

25 September 2007 6	Spezia	3–0	Frosinone	La Spezia
CEST (UTC+2)				Stadium: Stadio Alberto Picco

29 September 2007 7	Piacenza	1–0	Spezia	Piacenza
CEST (UTC+2)				Stadium: Stadio Leonardo Garilli

6 October 2007 8	Spezia	5–2	Treviso	La Spezia
CEST (UTC+2)				Stadium: Stadio Alberto Picco

14 October 2007 9	Lecce	2–2	Spezia	Lecce
CEST (UTC+2)				Stadium: Stadio Via del Mare

20 October 2007 10	Spezia	0–1	Rimini	La Spezia
CEST (UTC+2)				Stadium: Stadio Alberto Picco

27 October 2007 11	Vicenza	0–0	Spezia	Vicenza
CEST (UTC+2)				Stadium: Stadio Romeo Menti

30 October 2007 12	Spezia	1–0	Brescia	La Spezia
CEST (UTC+2)				Stadium: Stadio Alberto Picco

3 November 2007 13	Ravenna	2–2	Spezia	Ravenna
CEST (UTC+2)				Stadium: Stadio Bruno Benelli

10 November 2007 14	Spezia	1–1	Bari	La Spezia
CEST (UTC+2)				Stadium: Stadio Alberto Picco

24 November 2007 16	Avellino	2–2	Spezia	Avellino
CEST (UTC+2)				Stadium: Stadio Partenio

1 December 2007 15	Cesena	1–1	Spezia	Cesena
CEST (UTC+2)				Stadium: Stadio Dino Manuzzi

8 December 2007 17	Spezia	0–1	Chievo	La Spezia
CEST (UTC+2)				Stadium: Stadio Alberto Picco

15 December 2007 18	Spezia	2–0	Messina	La Spezia
CEST (UTC+2)				Stadium: Stadio Alberto Picco

22 December 2007 19	Mantova	3–1	Spezia	Mantua
CEST (UTC+2)				Stadium: Stadio Danilo Martelli

12 January 2008 20	Spezia	1–4	Pisa	La Spezia
CEST (UTC+2)				Stadium: Stadio Alberto Picco

19 January 2008 21	Grosseto	3–0	Spezia	Grosseto
CEST (UTC+2)				Stadium: Stadio Olimpico Carlo Zecchini

26 January 2008 22	Spezia	0–2	AlbinoLeffe	La Spezia
CEST (UTC+2)				Stadium: Stadio Alberto Picco

2 February 2008 23	Bologna	3–2	Spezia	Bologna
CEST (UTC+2)				Stadium: Stadio Renato dall'Ara

9 February 2008 24	Spezia	2–2	Modena	La Spezia
CEST (UTC+2)				Stadium: Stadio Alberto Picco

12 February 2008 25	Triestina	0–0	Spezia	Trieste
CEST (UTC+2)				Stadium: Stadio Nereo Rocco

16 February 2008 26	Spezia	0–0	Ascoli	La Spezia
CEST (UTC+2)				Stadium: Stadio Alberto Picco

23 February 2008 27	Frosinone	4–2	Spezia	Frosinone
CEST (UTC+2)				Stadium: Stadio Matusa

1 March 2008 28	Spezia	1–2	Piacenza	La Spezia
CEST (UTC+2)				Stadium: Stadio Alberto Picco

8 March 2008 29	Treviso	1–1	Spezia	Treviso
CEST (UTC+2)				Stadium: Stadio Omobono Tenni

15 March 2008 30	Spezia	1–1	Lecce	La Spezia
CEST (UTC+2)				Stadium: Stadio Alberto Picco

18 March 2008 31	Rimini	4–2	Spezia	Rimini
CEST (UTC+2)				Stadium: Stadio Romeo Neri

21 March 2008 32	Spezia	1–1	Vicenza	La Spezia
CEST (UTC+2)				Stadium: Stadio Alberto Picco

29 March 2008 33	Brescia	1–0	Spezia	Brescia
CEST (UTC+2)				Stadium: Stadio Mario Rigamonti

5 April 2008 34	Spezia	2–0	Ravenna	La Spezia
CEST (UTC+2)				Stadium: Stadio Alberto Picco

12 April 2008 35	Bari	2–1	Spezia	Bari
CEST (UTC+2)				Stadium: Stadio San Nicola

19 April 2008 36	Spezia	1–0	Cesena	La Spezia
CEST (UTC+2)				Stadium: Stadio Alberto Picco

26 April 2008 37	Spezia	2–2	Avellino	La Spezia
CEST (UTC+2)				Stadium: Stadio Alberto Picco

3 May 2008 38	Chievo	5–0	Spezia	Verona
CEST (UTC+2)				Stadium: Stadio Marcantonio Bentegodi

10 May 2008 39	Messina	0–0	Spezia	Messina
CEST (UTC+2)				Stadium: Stadio San Filippo

17 May 2008 40	Spezia	0–1	Mantova	La Spezia
CEST (UTC+2)				Stadium: Stadio Alberto Picco

25 May 2008 41	Pisa	1–0	Spezia	Pisa
CEST (UTC+2)				Stadium: Arena Garibaldi

1 June 2008 42	Spezia	2–2	Grosseto	La Spezia
CEST (UTC+2)				Stadium: Stadio Alberto Picco

=== Coppa Italia ===
14 August 2007 Round 1	Piacenza	2–0	Spezia	Fiorenzuola
18:00 CEST (UTC+2)	Anaclerio 74'; Pătrașcu 87'			Stadium: Stadio comunale Referee: Daniele Orsato
