= Luca Spinetti =

Italian footballer

Personal information
- Date of birth: 23 October 1985 (age 41)
- Place of birth: Rome, Italy
- Positions: Second striker; winger

Team information
- Current team: Albalonga

Youth career
- 2000–2003: Roma
- 2003–2005: Fiorentina

Senior career*
Years	Team	Apps	(Gls)
2005–2006	Monterotondo	10	(0)
2006–2007	Tivoli	26	(8)
2007	Chievo	0	(0)
2007–2008	Sansovino	8	(0)
2008–2009	Tor Tre Teste (amateur)		(6)
2009–2010	Cynthia	31	(6)
2010–2011	Pisoniano (amateur)		(3)
2011–2012	Cisterna (amateur)		(13)
2012–2013	Albalonga (amateur)		
Total		75	(14)
- * Club domestic league appearances and goals

Luca Spinetti (born 23 October 1985) is a former Italian professional footballer.

== Biography ==
=== Early career ===
Born in Rome, Lazio, Spinetti started his career at Roma. In 2003, he left Roma's Primavera team and signed by Fiorentina's Primavera youth team on a reported free transfer. He also played a friendly match for la viola against Sansovino and scored a goal. He wore no.81 shirt for first team that season.

He graduated from the youth team in 2005. He then spent 2 seasons in Serie D, for Lazio teams.

=== Lega Pro ===
In mid-2007, he was signed by Serie A club Chievo, but farmed to Serie C2 club Sansovino in co-ownership deal, along with goalkeeper Antonino Saviano, defenders Leonardo Moracci (loan), Marcus N'Ze, midfielder Maycol Andriani and forward Xhulian Rrudho. In June 2008, Chievo gave the remain 50% registration rights to Sansovino but he soon retired from professional football.

=== Returned to non-professional ===
In 2008–09 season he left for Eccellenza Lazio team Tor Tre Teste. He was the team second top-scorer with only 6 goals, behind Gianluca Toscano (30 goals). In 2009–10 Serie D season he was signed by Cynthia. In December 2010 Spinetti returned to Eccellenza Lazio.

Spinetti scored 13 goals in 2011–12 season.
