= Cristian Longobardi =

Italian footballer (born 1982)

Personal information
- Date of birth: 18 June 1982 (age 44)
- Place of birth: Pomigliano d'Arco, Italy
- Height: 1.83 m (6 ft 0 in)
- Position: Forward

Team information
- Current team: San Marino

Youth career
- 2000–2001: Cesena

Senior career*
Years	Team	Apps	(Gls)
2001–2002	Montecchio	4	(0)
2002–2003	Cervia	?	(?)
2003–2004	Bellaria Igea Marina	22	(2)
2004–2007	Boca San Lazzaro	92	(38)
2007–2009	San Marino	62	(28)
2009–2010	Rimini	33	(6)
2010–2011	Viareggio	17	(4)
2011	→ Bassano (loan)	13	(5)
2011–2013	Bassano	52	(14)
2013–2014	Gubbio	13	(2)
2014	Delta Porto Tolle	14	(4)
2014–2015	Sestri Levante	0	(0)
2015–2016	Parma	20	(6)
2016	Lucchese	6	(0)
2017	Imolese	16	(7)
2017	Varese	8	(4)
2018–	San Marino	7	(2)
- * Club domestic league appearances and goals as of 7 March 2018

Cristian Longobardi (born 18 June 1982) is an Italian footballer who plays for San Marino Calcio.

Longobardi primary played in Italian Lega Pro (ex-Serie C, the third and fourth highest level) Longobardi scored a double figure per season from 2004–05 to 2008–09 season.

== Biography ==
=== Between Serie C & D ===
Born in Pomigliano d'Arco, the Province of Naples, Longobardi started his career at Cesena at the age of 13. He then played for non-professional teams Montecchio and Cervia (Serie D and Eccellenza Emilia-Romagna). In mid-2003 he was signed by Serie C2 team Bellaria Igea Marina but returned to Serie D for Boca San Lazzaro in mid-2004. The team won the Group C champion and promoted, which Longobardi played for the team until the team relegated just a year later.

=== Lega Pro regular goalscorer ===
In July 2007 he was signed by San Marino Calcio along with Boca team-mate Alessandro Evangelisti. He scored his career high of 13 league goals and was offered a new 3-year contract. In 2008–09 Italian Seconda Divisione season he scored 15 goals.

In July 2009, he was signed by Prima Divisione team Rimini, finished as losing semi-finalists of promotion playoffs. The team bankrupted in July.

On 27 July he signed a 2-year contract with Prima Divisione team Viareggio. He scored 4 goals in 17 league games (eventually as team third top-scorer, behind Tommaso Marolda (6) and January newcomer Riccardo Bocalon (5)) He also played 2 games in 2010–11 Coppa Italia Lega Pro.

But on 13 January 2011 in exchange with defender Giovanni Martina of Bassano of the same division (but difference group). He scored 5 goals in 13 appearances, made him became the team joint-top-scorer along with Lorenzo Crocetti. On 5 July Bassano signed him outright and agreed a 2-year contract.

On 14 September 2013 he joined Gubbio. On 31 January 2014 he was signed by Delta Porto Tolle. In August 2015 he was signed by Parma Calcio 1913.
