= Antonino Saviano =

Italian footballer (born 1984)

Personal information
- Date of birth: 7 January 1984 (age 42)
- Place of birth: Reggio Calabria, Italy
- Height: 1.85 m (6 ft 1 in)
- Position: Goalkeeper

Youth career
- Reggina

Senior career*
Years	Team	Apps	(Gls)
2002–2006	Reggina	2	(0)
2002–2003	→ Matera (loan)	32	(0)
2003–2004	→ Lamezia (loan)	30	(0)
2004–2005	→ Napoli (loan)	0	(0)
2006	Chievo	0	(0)
2006–2007	Cassino	31	(0)
2007–2009	Sansovino	16	(0)
Total		111	(0)
- * Club domestic league appearances and goals

Antonino Saviano (born 7 January 1984) is a former Italian footballer.

== Biography ==
=== Reggina ===
Born in Reggio Calabria, Calabria, Saviano played 2 seasons in Serie D (top of non-professional leagues) before joining Napoli Soccer in mid-2004, a newly formed phoenix club of S.S.C. Napoli.

On 1 July 2005 he returned to his parent club Reggina and made his Serie A debut on March 5, 2006. That match Ivan Pelizzoli was not played and Nicola Pavarini was injured in the first half. That match Reggina won Treviso 1–0.

On 7 May 2006 (round 37), Saviano played his second (and the last) Serie A match, replacing Pelizzoli in the 55th minute. He concerned 2 more goals, made the club once losing 0–5. Eventually Nicola Amoruso scored to goal for Reggina, made the final scored fixed at losing to Fiorentina 2–5.

=== Chievo ===
On 1 July 2006 he was signed by fellow Serie A club Chievo on a free transfer. However, he was farmed to Serie C2 club Cassino, on a co-ownership deal.

In mid-2007, he was farmed to Sansovino from Chievo, along with defenders Marcus N'Ze, Leonardo Moracci, midfielders Maycol Andriani, Luca Spinetti and forward Xhulian Rrudho. Except Moracci, they joined the Serie C2 club on co-ownership deals.

In June 2008, Chievo gave the remaining 50% registration rights of Sansovino to Cassino. However, he soon retired from professional football.
