= Maycol Andriani =

Italian footballer

Personal information
- Date of birth: 17 September 1987 (age 39)
- Place of birth: Verona, Italy
- Height: 1.87 m (6 ft 2 in)
- Position: Midfielder

Team information
- Current team: Ciliverghe

Youth career
- Chievo

Senior career*
Years	Team	Apps	(Gls)
2006–2007	Chievo	0	(0)
2006–2007	→ Pro Vercelli (loan)	24	(1)
2007–2008	Sansovino	10	(0)
2008–2009	Sambonifacese	19	(0)
2009–2012	Castellana	86	(8)
2012–2013	Montichiari	32	(2)
2013–2014	Legnago Salus	24	(2)
2014–2019	Ciliverghe	154	(5)
2019	AC Vigasio	15	(1)
2019–	Ciliverghe	7	(0)
- * Club domestic league appearances and goals as of 20:39, 2 May 2020 (UTC)

Maycol Andriani (born 17 September 1987) is an Italian footballer who plays for the Serie D club Ciliverghe. Andriani played two seasons in the Lega Pro, from 2007 to 2009.

== Biography ==
Born in Verona, Veneto, Andriani started his career with Chievo. In 2006–07 season, he was loaned to Serie D club P.B. Vercelli along with Leonardo Moracci. In the next season, he left for the Serie C2 team Sansovino in co-ownership deal, along with Moracci (loan), goalkeeper Antonino Saviano, defender Marcus N'Ze, midfielder Luca Spinetti and forward Xhulian Rrudho. In June 2008, Chievo bought him back by winning an auction between the two clubs. In 2008–09 season he left for Lega Pro Seconda Divisione club Sambonifacese along with Fabio Lima de Silva and Marco Petresini. In June 2009 Chievo gave up the remaining 50% registration rights. Andriani then returned to Serie D for Castellana.
