= Tommaso Marolda =

Italian footballer and manager

Personal information
- Date of birth: 14 January 1981 (age 45)
- Place of birth: Venosa, Italy
- Height: 1.83 m (6 ft 0 in)
- Position: Forward

Senior career*
Years	Team	Apps	(Gls)
2000–2001	Melfi	8	(0)
2001–2002	Genzano	30	(26)
2002–2003	Lauria	30	(27)
2003–2004	Lavello	32	(32)
2004	Sangiustese	6	(?)
2004–2005	Santarcangelo	26	(8)
2005–2007	Fano	59	(32)
2007–2008	Teramo	34	(13)
2008–2009	Taranto	22	(1)
2009–2011	Viareggio	58	(9)
2011–2013	Fano	60	(16)
2014	Melfi	13	(2)
2014–2015	Recanatese	34	(10)
2015–2016	Olympia Agnonese	29	(15)
2016	Nardò	2	(0)
2016	Fermana	5	(1)
2016–2017	Avezzano	16	(4)

Managerial career
- 2018–2019: Bari (assistant)
- * Club domestic league appearances and goals

Tommaso Marolda (born 14 January 1981) is an Italian former footballer and football manager.

== Biography ==
Born in Venosa, Basilicata, Marolda started his career at Italian regional/non-professional teams. After a high goalscoring record from 2001 to 2007 in Eccellenza Basilicata and Serie D, Marolda joined his first fully professional team, Teramo, in 2007, and scored 13 goals in Serie C2. In the next season, he joined Taranto but only scored once in Lega Pro Prima Divisione. In 2009, he was signed by Viareggio and was the top scorer of the team in the 2010–11 season with 6 goals, higher than Cristian Longobardi (4 goals) and Riccardo Bocalon (5 goals), but the latter two only played half-season for the team. On 28 July 2011, he left with Viareggio and joined Fano.

After announcing his retirement as a player, he joined Fabrizio Castori as a match analyst at the serie B side Cesena. In 2018, he joined SSC Bari as assistant manager.
