= Luca Babbini =

Italian footballer

Personal information
- Date of birth: 22 January 1988 (age 38)
- Place of birth: Carrara, Italy
- Height: 1.84 m (6 ft 0 in)
- Position: Goalkeeper

Senior career*
Years	Team	Apps	(Gls)
2004–2006	Spezia	1	(0)
2006–2007	Sarzanese	34	(0)
2007–2008	Figline	26	(0)
2008–2010	Viareggio	15	(0)
2010–2011	Crociati Noceto	27	(0)
- * Club domestic league appearances and goals as of 20:31, 21 April 2010 (UTC)

Luca Babbini (born 22 January 1988 in Carrara, Italy) is an Italian footballer.

== Biography ==
Babbini was signed by Viareggio in 2008. That season he became the understudy of Alessio Arfè. In the next season he was the backup of Nicola Ravaglia. In 2010, he left for Crociati Noceto and Viareggio signed Giorgio Merlano and Carlo Pinsoglio from Juventus to replace Ravaglia and Babbini.
