= Lorenzo Crocetti =

Italian footballer (born 1983)

Personal information
- Date of birth: 20 September 1983 (age 43)
- Place of birth: Catanzaro, Italy
- Height: 1.85 m (6 ft 1 in)
- Position: Forward

Team information
- Current team: A.S.D. Montalcino

Youth career
- Fiorentina

Senior career*
Years	Team	Apps	(Gls)
2002	Fiorentina	1	(0)
2002–2003	Perugia	2	(0)
2003–2004	Vis Pesaro	25	(6)
2004–2005	Cittadella	24	(3)
2005–2010	Pergocrema	90	(28)
2007	→ Pro Sesto (loan)	13	(0)
2008–2009	→ Varese (loan)	29	(10)
2010	→ Bassano (loan)	13	(6)
2010–2011	Bassano	16	(5)
2011	Barcellona	34	(31)
2011–2012	Casale	20	(4)
2012	Lugano	10	(0)
2012–2013	Mendrisio	9	(5)
2013–2014	San Marino	22	(3)
2014–2015	Siena	20	(13)
2015	Siracusa	16	(9)
2015–2016	Gubbio	13	(4)
2016	Sangiovannese	2	(0)
2016	Lecco	10	(3)
2016–2017	Real Madrid	19	(11)
2017–2019	CS Scandicci 1908		
2019–	Montalcino Albereta San salvi 2020		

International career
1999	Italy U16	3	(0)
2000	Italy U17	3	(0)
2000–2001	Italy U18	7	(3)
2003–2004	Italy U20	8	(2)
- * Club domestic league appearances and goals as of 1 October 2017

Lorenzo Crocetti (born 20 September 1983) is an Italian former footballer who last played as a forward for Montalcino.

== Biography ==
Born in Bagno a Ripoli, the Province of Florence, Tuscany, Crocetti started his career at Florence club AC Fiorentina. Crocetti made his Serie A debut in the last round of 2001–02 Serie A, on 5 May, against Perugia. Crocetti was the starting forward. He was substituted by Filippo Fedeli at half time. At the end of season Fiorentina bankrupted.

On 31 August 2002, Crocetti joined Serie B club Perugia on free transfer. He played twice for the first team, in the last few rounds of 2002–03 Serie B.

From 2003 he spent the next 10 seasons in Italian Lega Pro as well as in Swiss Challenge League and 1. Liga Classic.

Crocetti was transferred to the third division club Vis Pesaro in mid-2003 in co-ownership deal. Vis Pesaro bought the remaining 50% registration rights of Crocetti in June 2004 but re-sold Crocetti to Cittadella soon after.

Crocetti joined Pergocrema in August 2005, for €400,000. He spent 5 seasons in Pergoletto including periods of loan. Crocetti scored 16 goals in 2005–06 Serie C2, as the joint-second in the group A of the fourth division. (another was Roberto Barbieri)

In January 2010 he left for Bassano in temporary deal. He was signed outright at the end of the season. However, in January 2011, after the club signed Cristian Longobardi, Crocetti left the club in another temporary deal. Both Crocetti and Longobardi were the team top-scorer of 5 goals only that season. Crocetti was the third scorer for Lucchese, behind Alessandro Marotta and Luigi Grassi. However, in term of goal per game (0.50) he was the first in the squad.

On 13 February 2012, he was signed by FC Lugano.

After one and a half years in Switzerland, Crocetti returned to Italian football for San Marinese club San Marino Calcio.

On 31 August 2014, Crocetti moved to recently reformed Serie D team Siena.

=== International career ===
Crocetti was a member of Italy youth teams. He was in the squad for 2000 UEFA European Under-16 Football Championship qualification (now renamed to under-17 event).
