= Sébastien Frey =

French footballer (born 1980)

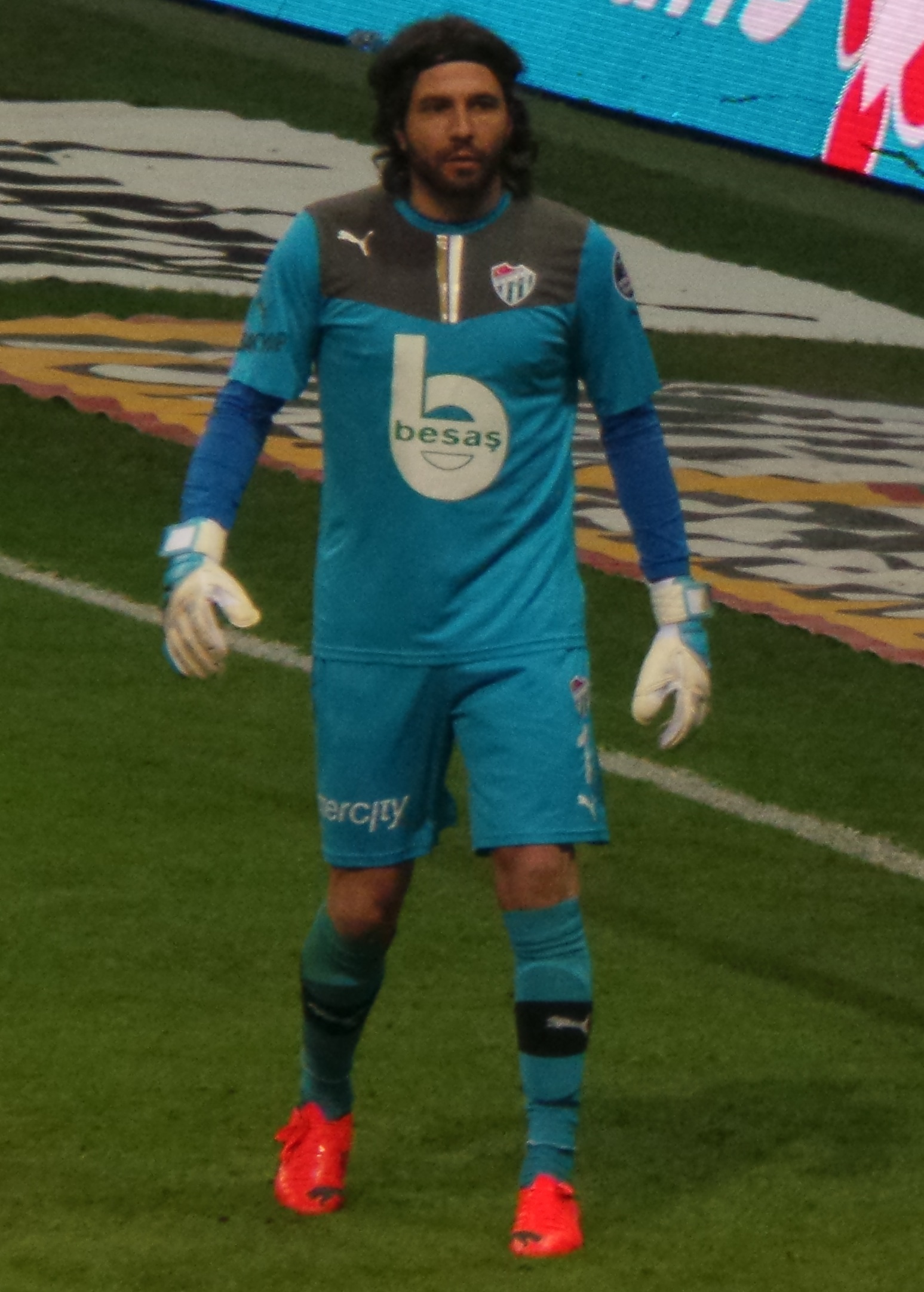
- Frey with Bursaspor in 2014

Personal information
- Full name: Sébastien Frey
- Date of birth: 18 March 1980 (age 46)
- Place of birth: Thonon-les-Bains, Haute-Savoie, France
- Height: 1.89 m (6 ft 2 in)
- Position: Goalkeeper

Senior career*
Years	Team	Apps	(Gls)
1997–1998	Cannes	24	(0)
1998–2001	Inter Milan	35	(0)
1999–2000	→ Hellas Verona (loan)	30	(0)
2001–2006	Parma	132	(0)
2005–2006	→ Fiorentina (loan)	18	(0)
2006–2011	Fiorentina	157	(0)
2011–2013	Genoa	74	(0)
2013–2015	Bursaspor	27	(0)
Total		497	(0)

International career
2000–2001	France U21	4	(0)
2007–2008	France	2	(0)
- * Club domestic league appearances and goals

Sébastien Frey (born 18 March 1980) is a French former professional footballer who played as a goalkeeper.

Frey began his club career in France with Cannes in 1997. He spent almost all of his career in the Italian Serie A, from 1998 to 2013, playing for Inter Milan, Hellas Verona, Parma, Fiorentina, and Genoa. He won the Guerin d'Oro in 2000 and the 2001–02 Coppa Italia. He ended his career in 2015, after two seasons with Turkish side Bursaspor. In 2022, he was inducted into the Fiorentina Hall of Fame. He played twice for the France national football team between 2007 and 2008 and was part of the squad at Euro 2008.

== Club career ==
=== Cannes ===
Frey began his career with French side AS Cannes in 1997, at the age of 17. On 20 September 1997, he made his professional league debut, playing as a starter in a 1–1 home draw against Rennes. At the end of the 1997–98 season, Frey made 24 league appearances and took Grégory Wimbée's starting goalkeeping spot in the first team.

=== Inter Milan ===
Following two promising seasons at Cannes, Frey began to attract attention from abroad, most noticeably from Inter Milan whom had been notified of his exceptional talents by former keeper Walter Zenga and Serie A rivals Juventus. Eventually, he opted to join Inter. At Inter in earlier season, he was the third goalkeeper behind Andrea Mazzantini and Gianluca Pagliuca until Mazzantini was sold to Perugia, making Frey as second choice goalkeeper. On 21 March 1999, Frey finally made his debut for the club against Genoa. Frey also made an appearance against Sampdoria when he was put on instead of Pagliuca at 70 minutes on the score (and final) 4–0. He ended the season with a total of seven league appearances for Nerazzurri.

==== Loan to Verona and return to Inter Milan ====
In the summer transfer window of 1999, Frey moved on loan to Verona, where he played thirty league appearances and helped the team in order to avoid relegation.

The following year, he returned from loan to play for Inter, as the club sold Angelo Peruzzi for cash and Marco Ballotta. At Inter, Frey was recalled in view of his performance with Verona and Inter, and in the 2000–01 season, he became the youngest goalie in the Lombard team's history, and the first foreigner to move from Inter to this post. He also participated in the preliminary round of the Champions League. His exemplary behavior, his maturity and dedication to the club propel him on rare occasions to be the team captain. However, the team played below expectations, and the club decided to make several changes to the squad; after the arrival of Francesco Toldo from Fiorentina, Frey was placed on the transfer list.

=== Parma ===
Following Toldo's transfer to Inter, Frey was forced to find a new club. He was transferred to Parma in the summer of 2001, for 8 billion lire cash plus Sérgio Conceição (Conceição was tagged for 32 billion lire, Inter's official site claimed the cash was 10 billion lire), or 40 billion lire with whom he won the 2001–02 Coppa Italia. Frey was the replacement for Gianluigi Buffon who was sold to Juventus for a transfer fee of 100 billion lire in the same window. The transfer fee was the world-record goalkeeper's transfer fee at that time. It was a difficult task for Frey to replace Buffon.

His experience in Parma was positive and provided ample opportunity for Frey to demonstrate his talent and justify the trust placed in him by the club. He became a key element of the squad and regularly played in the UEFA Cup. Frey won the 2001–02 edition of the Coppa Italia with Parma, leading the club to win the title for the third time since 1992; however, Frey never played in the tournament with Cláudio Taffarel preferred for the final. In the 2002 Supercoppa Italiana, however, Frey started in goal against Juventus, but could not help his team to avoid losing 2–1 to the league champions.

In June 2005, Parma avoided relegation to Serie B against Bologna, thanks to Frey and his outstanding performance. Despite his attachment to the club, an economic concern of the latter to balance its budget meant Frey had to be sold. Frey joined Fiorentina for the 2005–06 season, after four seasons with Parma, on the a loan with an option to be.

=== Fiorentina ===
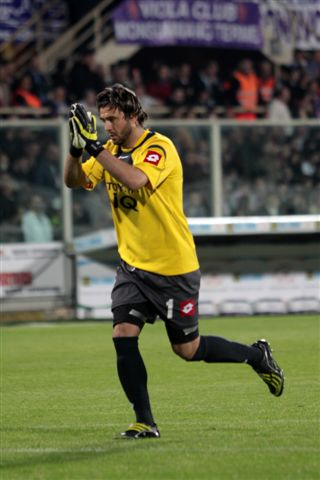
Frey playing for Fiorentina in 2009

Frey joined Fiorentina on loan for the 2005–06 campaign, and signed a permanent deal with the club for €6 million (€5.6M went to Parma) at the end of the year following a glittering season where he formed the backbone of the team along with Cristian Brocchi, Stefano Fiore, and Luca Toni. After a positive first half of the season for him and his team, on 10 January 2006, during a match in the Coppa Italia against Juventus, he received a blow after a conflict with Marcelo Zalayeta.

Due to the clash, Frey received blunt trauma to the tibia, which ruled him out of the starting line-up for several months, forcing the club's sporting director Pantaleo Corvino to hire a replacement, which turned out to be Romanian keeper Bogdan Lobonț.

On 15 May 2006, the Florentine officials announced the outright purchase of Frey, buying him for an amount equal to €6 million. In the new season Frey regained his starting spot in goal, after an initial physiological problems due to long stop regains fitness.

On 13 December 2007, Frey suffered a meniscus injury during training, and underwent knee surgery the next day. He returned for Fiorentina's 2–1 victory over Parma on 13 January 2008, after being sidelined for one month, and his outstanding play was rewarded with a contract extension. Fiorentina reached the semi-finals of the UEFA Cup that season.

In the 2008–09 Serie A season, Frey conceded less than a goal per game, conceding only thirty-one goals in thirty-eight matches.

On 2 November 2010, Frey injured his knee during training, suffering an Anterior cruciate ligament injury, ruling him out for the rest of the season.

=== Genoa ===
In 2011, Frey joined Genoa on a five-year deal on a free transfer after falling out of favour with Fiorentina and being replaced by the newly signed Artur Boruc, who had joined the club from Celtic the previous season. The move turned out to be a failure as Genoa was moving backwards and was ever present in the relegation zone. Frey left after 2 years and was replaced by Mattia Perin. Before joining Genoa, Frey revealed talks with French spenders PSG during the summer transfer window, but the capital side eventually acquired Palermo goalkeeper Salvatore Sirigu instead. Frey also revealed that German side Bayern Munich was keen to sign him in the past.

=== Bursaspor ===
"...It was a great honor to have the opportunity to play at Bursaspor and meet the great fans. The experience I had in Bursa and Turkey will always stay with me and I'll remember it with great joy and pleasure.. "

— Frey's partial Instagram message.

On 15 July 2013, Frey joined Turkish club Bursaspor for an undisclosed fee. After he failed to make an appearance during 2014–15 season, his contract was mutually terminated on 9 July 2015, and Frey subsequently retired from professional football. He confirmed his farewell from the club with an Instagram message on 15 July 2015, stating his gratefulness for his spell at club.

== International career ==
Frey received his first call-up for France for a match against Poland in November 2004, but did not make an appearance. He earned his first cap in France's final UEFA Euro 2008 qualifier against Ukraine on 21 November 2007. The match ended in a 2–2 draw after he erred on Andriy Shevchenko's equalising goal. He was a member of France's Euro 2008 finals squad. On 20 August 2008, Frey announced his retirement from international football at the age of 28 to focus on his club career.

== Style of play ==
Recognized for his leadership, composure, and consistent performances, Frey was considered one of the standout goalkeepers in Serie A during his era. Renowned for his dynamic and agile playing style, he was celebrated for his acrobatic shot-stopping and strong aerial skills. His exceptional reactions, positional awareness, speed, and proficiency in one-on-one scenarios made him particularly notable. However, he was less adept at leaving the goal line to intercept crosses and excelled more when positioned between the posts. Having started as an outfield player in his youth, Frey also demonstrated dependable ball handling and distribution with his feet.

== Personal life ==
Frey's grandfather, André, was a French international footballer, and his father, Raymond, was also a professional footballer who played as a goalkeeper. His younger brother, Nicolas, played as a defensive midfielder for Serie A team Chievo. Frey is a Buddhist (Soka Gakkai), and credited former Fiorentina legend Roberto Baggio as one of his spiritual mentors.

== Career statistics ==
=== Club ===
Appearances and goals by club, season and competition
Club	Season	League			Cup		Continental		Other		Total	
Club	Season	Division	Apps	Goals	Apps	Goals	Apps	Goals	Apps	Goals	Apps	Goals
Cannes	1997–98	Division 1	24	0			—		—		24	0
Inter Milan	1998–99	Serie A	7	0	2	0	0	0	—		9	0
Inter Milan	2000–01	Serie A	28	0	0	0	10	0	—		38	0
Inter Milan	Total		35	0	2	0	10	0	—		47	0
Hellas Verona (loan)	1999–2000	Serie A	30	0	1	0	—		—		31	0
Parma	2001–02	Serie A	29	0	0	0	10	0	—		39	0
Parma	2002–03	Serie A	34	0	0	0	4	0	1	0	39	0
Parma	2003–04	Serie A	33	0	2	0	5	0	—		40	0
Parma	2004–05	Serie A	36	0	0	0	1	0	—		37	0
Parma	Total		132	0	2	0	20	0	1	0	155	0
Fiorentina (loan)	2005–06	Serie A	18	0	5	0	—		—		23	0
Fiorentina	2006–07	Serie A	38	0	2	0	—		—		40	0
Fiorentina	2007–08	Serie A	35	0	1	0	13	0	—		49	0
Fiorentina	2008–09	Serie A	37	0	0	0	8	0	—		45	0
Fiorentina	2009–10	Serie A	36	0	3	0	9	0	—		48	0
Fiorentina	2010–11	Serie A	11	0	0	0	—		—		11	0
Fiorentina	Total		175	0	11	0	30	0	—		216	0
Genoa	2011–12	Serie A	38	0	0	0	—		—		38	0
Genoa	2012–13	Serie A	36	0	0	0	—		—		36	0
Genoa	Total		74	0	10	0	—		—		74	0
Bursaspor	2013–14	Süper Lig	27	0	10	0	2	0	—		39	0
Bursaspor	2014–15	Süper Lig	0	0	0	0	0	0	—		0	0
Bursaspor	Total		27	0	10	0	2	0	—		39	0
Total			497	0	26	0	62	0	1	0	586	0

=== International ===
France
Year	Apps	Goals
2007	1	0
2008	1	0
Total	2	0

== Honours ==
Parma

- Coppa Italia: 2001–02

Individual

- Guerin d'Oro: 2000
- ACF Fiorentina Hall of Fame: 2022
