= Marcus N'Ze =

Italian footballer (born 1987)

Personal information
- Full name: Marcus N'Ze Kouassi
- Date of birth: 7 April 1986 (age 40)
- Place of birth: Sekondi, Ghana
- Height: 1.87 m (6 ft 2 in)
- Position: Right-back

Team information
- Current team: Montorio FC

Youth career
- ChievoVerona

Senior career*
Years	Team	Apps	(Gls)
2005–2007	ChievoVerona	0	(0)
2005–2007	→ Canavese (loan)	58	(2)
2007–2008	Sansovino	5	(0)
2008–2010	Domegliara	56	(3)
2010–2019	Virtus Verona	165	(7)
2019–2020	GSD Ambrosiana	22	(1)
2020–2022	Calcio Caldiero Terme	50	(0)
2022–	Montorio FC		
- * Club domestic league appearances and goals as of 15:28, 27 December 2022 (UTC)

Marcus N'Ze Kouassi (born 7 April 1986) is a Ghanaian-born Italian footballer who plays as a right-back for Eccellenza club Montorio FC.

== Biography ==
Born in Sekondi, Ghana, N'Ze moved to Italy at young age. He started his career at Verona for Chievo. He graduated from youth team in 2005 and left for Serie D club Canavese, which he spent 2 seasons.

In July 2007, he left for Sansovino in co-ownership deal along with Leonardo Moracci, Xhulian Rrudho. Antonino Saviano, Luca Spinetti and Maycol Andriani. In June 2008, Chievo bought back N'Ze by winning an auction between the two clubs. but after few weeks left Verona to sign for Serie D club Domegliara. In 2009–10 season, he played 33 times and scored 1 goal.

In 2010–11 Serie D he left for Virtus Verona.

After Allegrini's retirement, he became the new captain of Virtus Verona at the start of 2018–19 season.

For the 2019–20 season, he joined GSD Ambrosiana in Serie D. In June 2020, he joined fellow league club Caldiero Terme. In June 2022, N'ze moved to Eccellenza club Montorio FC.

== Personal life ==
His brother Desmond N'Ze is also a professional footballer.

== Honours ==
- Serie D/A: 2007
