= Giovanni Martina =

Italian footballer

Personal information
- Date of birth: 20 January 1987 (age 39)
- Place of birth: Vittorio Veneto, Italy
- Position: Right-back

Team information
- Current team: Bassano

Youth career
- Treviso

Senior career*
Years	Team	Apps	(Gls)
2006–2009	Treviso	5	(0)
2007–2008	→ Pizzighettone (loan)	22	(0)
2009–	Bassano	17	(0)
2011	→ Viareggio (loan)	4	(0)
- * Club domestic league appearances and goals

Giovanni Martina (born 20 January 1987) is an Italian footballer who plays for Bassano.

== Biography ==
Born in Vittorio Veneto, the Province of Treviso, Martina started his career at Treviso. In his last year with Treviso's under-20 youth team, he also played 3 Serie B games. In the first game he replaced Gianni Guigou in the 63rd minute on 8 October 2006, drawing 0–0 with Piacenza. In July 2007 he was loaned to Pizzighettone along with Eros Bagnara. On 1 July 2008 Martina returned to Treviso but only played 2 times in Serie B, which the team relegated and then bankrupted.

On 5 August 2009 he joined Bassano on free transfer. He played a career high of 13 games, and in June his contract was extended. That season despite finished seventh in the Group B of 2009–10 Lega Pro Seconda Divisione, the team promoted to Prima Divisione to fill the vacancies by the bankrupted teams. He only played 4 times in his maiden Prima Divisione season before moved to fellow Prima Divisione team Viareggio (but from another group, Group B), in exchange with forward Cristian Longobardi. he was the understudy of Nicolò Brighenti; just played four times: started once as right-back (but sent off at first half), replacing centre-back Lorenzo Fiale once and left-back Davide Bertolucci twice respectively.
