= Angelo Antonazzo =

Italian footballer (born 1981)

Personal information
- Date of birth: 2 October 1981 (age 45)
- Place of birth: Taranto, Italy
- Height: 1.86 m (6 ft 1 in)
- Position: Defender

Senior career*
Years	Team	Apps	(Gls)
1998–2003	Grottaglie	132	(3)
2003–2004	Gubbio	25	(1)
2004–2006	Grosseto	34	(2)
2005–2006	→ Bologna (loan)	27	(0)
2006–2008	Modena	69	(3)
2008–2009	Frosinone	35	(4)
2008–2010	Chievo	0	(0)
2009–2010	→ Empoli (loan)	32	(2)
2010–2012	Taranto	52	(3)
2012–2013	Grosseto	15	(1)
2013	Reggina	17	(1)
2013–2015	Casertana	40	(3)
2015–2016	Martina Franca	23	(0)
2016–2017	Hellas Taranto		

Managerial career
- 2017–2021: Virtus Francavilla (youth scouting coordinator)
- 2021–2024: Virtus Francavilla (technical director)
- * Club domestic league appearances and goals

Angelo Antonazzo (born 2 October 1981) is an Italian football official and a former defender.

Antonazzo previously played 5 Serie D seasons, one Serie C2, one Serie C1, three Serie B before signed by A.C. ChievoVerona on 25 June 2008, along with Nicolas Frey. He deal was part of the deal that Salvatore Bruno and Michele Troiano went to Modena outright. He then farmed to Frosinone in join-ownership. He was bought back in June 2009 and loaned to Serie B side Empoli.

On 16 August 2010 he joined Taranto on a 3-year contract. As of 2013 He has joined Serie B Club Reggina for the remainder of the 2012–13 season.
