= Nicolas Frey =

French footballer (born 1984)

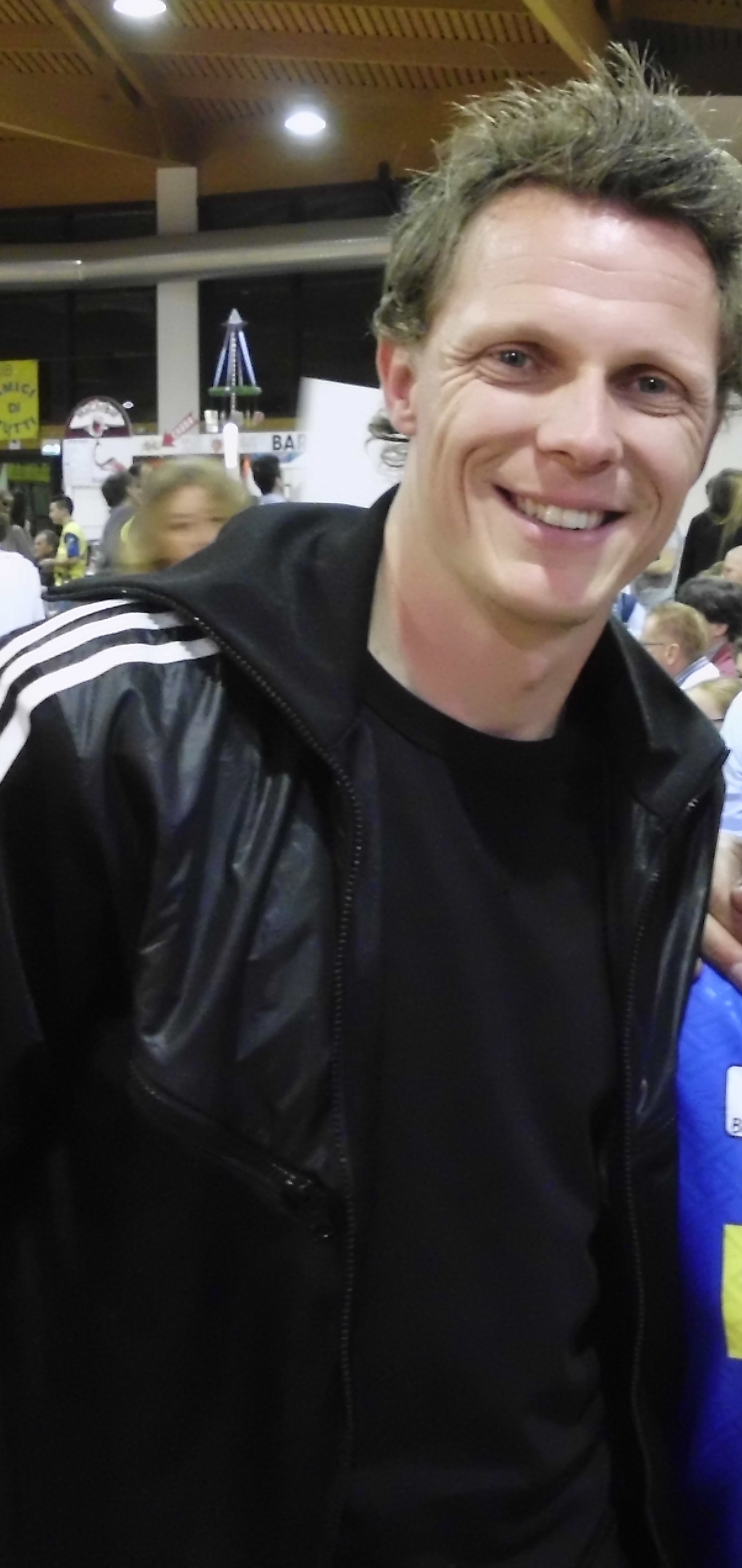

Personal information
- Full name: Nicolas Sébastien Frey
- Date of birth: 6 March 1984 (age 42)
- Place of birth: Thonon-les-Bains, France
- Height: 1.84 m (6 ft 0 in)
- Position: Defender

Youth career
- 1990–1994: AS Vence
- 1994–2002: Cannes

Senior career*
| Years | Team | Apps | (Gls) |
| 2002–2004 | Cannes B | | |
| 2004–2005 | Legnano | 28 | (1) |
| 2005–2008 | Modena | 82 | (0) |
| 2008–2020 | Chievo | 226 | (0) |
| 2018 | → Venezia (loan) | 12 | (0) |
- * Club domestic league appearances and goals

Nicolas Sébastien Frey (born 6 March 1984) is a French former professional footballer who played as a right back.

== Club career ==
Born in Thonon-les-Bains, Haute-Savoie, Frey played exclusively at amateur level in his country, joining AS Cannes' youth system at the age of 10 and spending two seasons with its reserves as a senior. In 2004, aged 20, he moved to Italy with A.C. Legnano, in Serie C.

After one year, Frey signed for Serie B club Modena FC, being an important first-team member during his spell and totalling 62 league games in his last two years. In the summer of 2008, he joined A.C. ChievoVerona in a co-ownership deal along with Angelo Antonazzo, in exchange for Salvatore Bruno and Michele Troiano. He made his Serie A debut on 5 October 2008 in a 0–2 home loss against ACF Fiorentina, and finished his debut campaign with 21 league matches as the Verona side retained their division status.

On 17 July 2009, Chievo signed Frey on a permanent basis. During his spell with the club, he often shared right-back duties with Gennaro Sardo.

Frey returned to the second division on 31 January 2018, with the 33-year-old being loaned to Venezia FC. After initially leaving Chievo at the end of 2018–19, he rejoined the team on a one-year contract on 6 September 2019.

== Personal life ==
Frey's older brother, Sébastien, was also a footballer. A goalkeeper, he too was brought up at Cannes, and also played most of his career in Italy, mainly with Parma F.C. and Fiorentina.

His father, Raymond, was a professional goalkeeper, while his grandfather André was a defender who played several years with Toulouse FC, reaching the France national team as Sébastien.
