= André Frey =

French footballer (1919-2002)

Personal information
- Date of birth: 7 November 1919
- Place of birth: Rosselange, France
- Date of death: 18 December 2002 (aged 83)
- Place of death: France
- Position: Defender

Senior career*
Years	Team	Apps	(Gls)
1937–1940	Metz		
1940–1944	Toulouse		
1944–1945	Metz		
1945–1951	Toulouse		

International career
1944–1950	France	6	(0)
- * Club domestic league appearances and goals

André Frey (7 November 1919 – 18 December 2002) was a French international footballer who played for Metz and Toulouse as a defender.

== Personal life ==
He was the grandfather of Sébastien Frey and Nicolas Frey and the great-grandfather of Daniel Frey (son of Sébastien), all footballers.
