= Xhulian Rrudho =

Albanian footballer

Personal information
- Date of birth: 9 September 1987 (age 39)
- Place of birth: Divjakë, Albania
- Height: 1.79 m (5 ft 10 in)
- Position: Striker

Team information
- Current team: KF Tirana

Youth career
- 1999–2004: AC Careni Pieve di Soligo
- 2004–2005: Gemeaz San Polo
- 2005: Ancona

Senior career*
Years	Team	Apps	(Gls)
2005–2007	Ancona	11	(1)
2007	Chievo	1	(0)
2007–2008	Sansovino	13	(0)
2008	→ Scafatese (loan)	1	(0)
2008–2009	Partizani	0	(0)
2009–2010	Tirana	1	(0)

International career^{‡}
2007	Albania U-21	3	(0)
- * Club domestic league appearances and goals as of 31 January 2008 ‡ National team caps and goals as of N/A

Xhulian Rrudho (pronounced [ˈdʒuljan ˈruðɔ]; born 9 September 1987 in Lushnjë) is an Albanian former footballer who last played for KF Tirana.

== Club career ==
After moving to Italy as a child, he started his professional career with Italian Serie C1/B team Ancona. On 31 January 2007 he agreed a permanent move to Serie A club Chievo.

On 3 March 2007 he played his first (and only) Serie A match for Chievo against AC Milan In the 2007 summer market he was farmed to Tuscan Serie C2 team Sansovino in co-ownership deal, where he spent the first half of the 2007–08 season along with goalkeeper Antonino Saviano, defenders Leonardo Moracci (loan), Marcus N'Ze, midfielders Maycol Andriani and Luca Spinetti. On 31 January 2008 he left Sansovino and agreed to move to Scafatese, another Serie C2 team, in a loan deal.

In July 2008 he returned to his native Albania, joining Partizani Tirana. In January 2009 he moved to KF Tirana, another top flight Albanian club, but he sued the club in October 2011 citing the club still owed him money. As his football career had been derailed, he finished his professional career at only 23.

== Legal issues ==
In February 2013 he was arrested in Ancona for drug trade after a police investigation in Montacuto (Piedmont); his house was full of materials used for packing the drugs.
