= Stefano Procida =

Italian footballer

Personal information
- Date of birth: 14 February 1990 (age 36)
- Height: 1.85 m (6 ft 1 in)
- Position: Centre back

Team information
- Current team: Akragas

Youth career
- Torino
- 2008–2009: Napoli
- 2009–2010: Torino

Senior career*
Years	Team	Apps	(Gls)
2010–2011	Ternana	5	(0)
2011–2012	Alessandria	5	(0)
2012	Visé	0	(0)
2012–2013	Brindisi FC		
2013	Licata	7	(0)
2013–2014	Vibonese	10	(0)
2014–2015	Delta Rovigo	19	(0)
2015–2016	Derthona	31	(2)
2016	Cuneo	7	(0)
2016–2018	Pinerolo	21	(1)
2018	Matelica	0	(0)
2018	ASD Troina	2	(0)
2019	Real Giulianova	1	(0)
2019–	Akragas		
- * Club domestic league appearances and goals as of 18:44, 23 February 2020 (UTC)

Stefano Procida (born 14 February 1990) is an Italian footballer who plays for A.S.D. Akragas 2018.

== Career ==
Procida started his professional career with Torino F.C. He was the member of the U17 team in 2006–07 season. In the next season Procida was a member of the U18 team as well as the reserve. On 31 January 2008 Procida was sold to S.S.C. Napoli in co-ownership deal for a nominal fee of €500. After 2 half seasons with Napoli reserve, Procida returned to Torino in January 2009 for free.

In January 2010 Procida was sold to Ternana in another co-ownership deal. In June 2010 Torino gave up the remain 50% registration rights. Procida played 5 games for Ternana in 2010–11 Lega Pro Prima Divisione. In January 2011 Procida left for fellow third division club Alessandria in a new co-ownership deal. Procida only played twice for his new club. The club finished as the last and relegated. In June 2011 Ternana also gave up the rights.

Procida only played 3 times in 2011–12 Lega Pro Seconda Divisione. In January 2012 Procida left for Belgian Second Division club Visé.

On 12 September 2019, Procida joined A.S.D. Akragas 2018.
