= Mirko Cudini =

Italian footballer and coach

Personal information
- Date of birth: 1 September 1973 (age 53)
- Place of birth: Sant'Elpidio a Mare, Italy
- Height: 1.80 m (5 ft 11 in)
- Position: Defender

Senior career*
Years	Team	Apps	(Gls)
1991–1994	Sambenedettese	44	(0)
1994–1995	Avellino	15	(0)
1995–1998	Salernitana	59	(0)
1998–2001	Torino	52	(0)
2000	→ Salernitana (loan)	18	(0)
2001–2003	Cagliari	58	(0)
2003–2004	Genoa	10	(0)
2004	→ Ascoli (loan)	18	(0)
2004–2007	Ascoli	69	(3)
2007–2008	Vicenza	54	(1)
2008–2009	Perugia	21	(0)
2009–2011	Monza	62	(2)
2011–2013	Fermana	47	(2)
2013–2014	Monturanese	14	(0)

Managerial career
- 2016–2017: Sangiustese
- 2018–2019: San Nicolò
- 2019–2022: Campobasso
- 2022: Fidelis Andria
- 2023: Foggia
- 2024: Foggia
- 2024: Pineto
- 2025: Ascoli
- 2025: Giugliano
- * Club domestic league appearances and goals

Mirko Cudini (born 1 September 1973) is an Italian professional football coach and a former player.

== Club career ==
He played three seasons (36 games, 1 goal) in the Serie A for Torino and Ascoli.

In January 2007, he left for Serie B club Vicenza. In exchange, Ascoli signed Leandro Vitiello in co-ownership deal.

In 2008–09 season he left for Prima Divisione club Perugia. In July 2009 he left for Monza.

== Coaching career ==
On 5 July 2019, he was appointed head coach of Serie D club Campobasso. He guided Campobasso to promotion in the 2020–21 Serie D, and was confirmed in charge of the Rossoblu also for the club's comeback season to Serie C.

After guiding Campobasso to safety in their 2021–22 Serie C campaign, on 30 April 2022, Cudini announced his departure from the Rossoblu. On 15 June 2022, Cudini was unveiled as the new head coach of Serie C club Fidelis Andria. On 1 November 2022, following a string of negative results that left Fidelis Andria deep into relegation zone, both Cudini and sporting director Sandro Federico were dismissed from their respective roles.

On 26 July 2023, Cudini was unveiled as the new head coach of Serie C club Foggia. He was dismissed from his role on 14 December 2023, following negative results during his tenure. A month later, on 23 January 2024, Cudini was however reinstated as Foggia boss.

On 2 July 2024, Cudini signed a two-year contract as head coach of fellow Serie C club Pineto. He was sacked on 7 October 2024 due to negative results. He successively took over as the new head coach of Ascoli from 27 January 2025, being however dismissed himself just less than two months later, on 14 March, after suggering five defeats in his seven games in charge.

On 4 September 2025, Cudini signed for Serie C club Giugliano. His stint at Giugliano however lasted just barely more than a month, as he was dismissed on 16 October 2025.

== Honours ==
=== Coach ===
Campobasso

- Serie D: 2020–21 (Girone F)
