= Carmine Coppola (footballer) =

Italian footballer (born 1979)

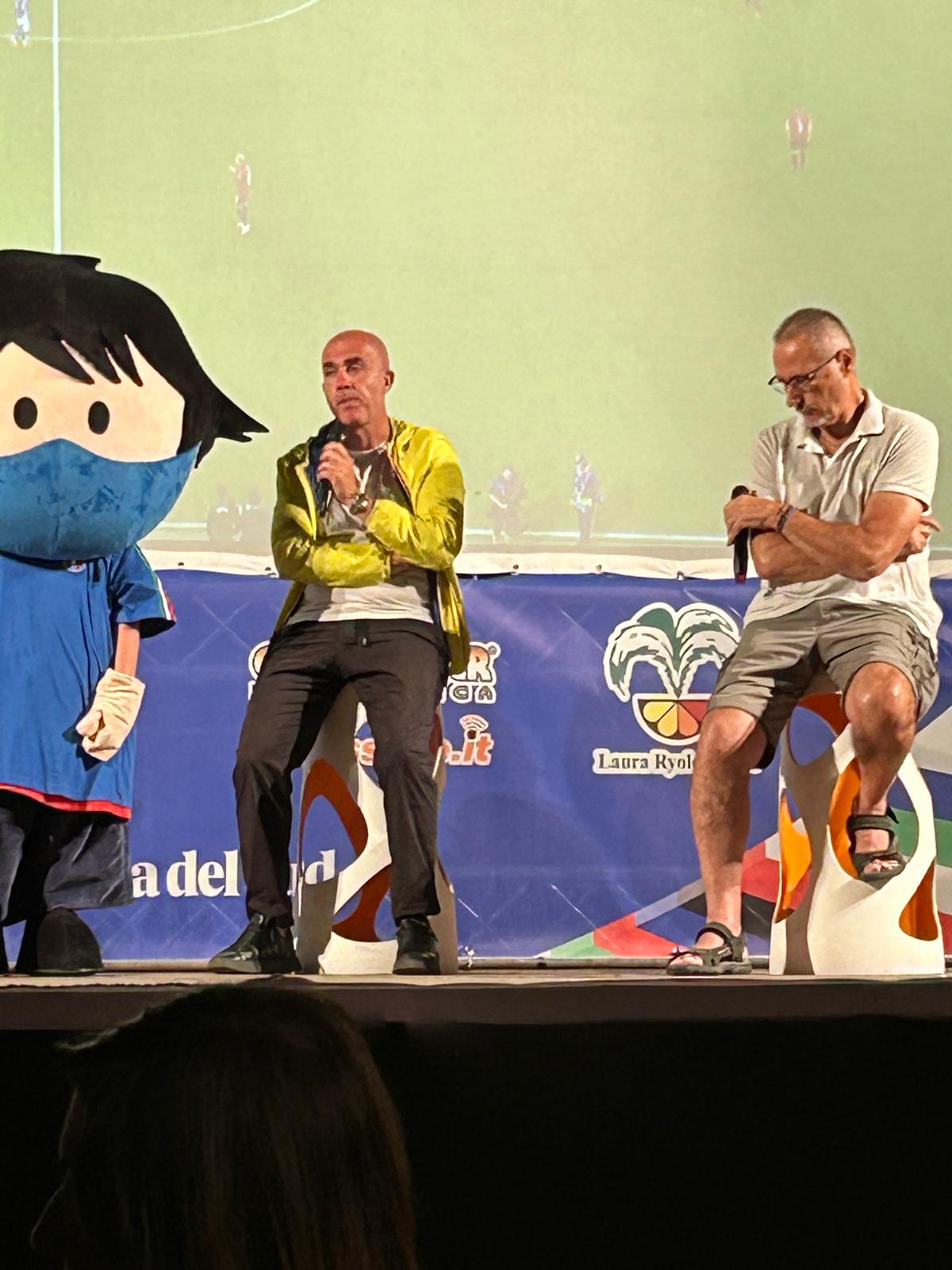
- Coppola (left) in Messina in 2024

Personal information
- Date of birth: 10 January 1979 (age 47)
- Place of birth: Pollena Trocchia, Italy
- Height: 1.75 m (5 ft 9 in)
- Position: Midfielder

Youth career
- 1996–1998: Vicenza

Senior career*
Years	Team	Apps	(Gls)
1998–2000	Vicenza	0	(0)
1998–2000	→ Cittadella (loan)	42	(0)
2000	→ Triestina (loan)	6	(0)
2000–2001	AlbinoLeffe	1	(0)
2001	→ Triestina (loan)	17	(1)
2001–2008	Messina	166	(4)
2007	→ Livorno (loan)	11	(0)
2008	Frosinone	13	(0)
2009	Salernitana	9	(0)
2009	Arezzo	15	(1)
2010	Taranto	6	(0)
2010–2011	SPAL	30	(2)
2011–2012	Messina	30	(2)

International career^{‡}
2005	Italy	2	(0)
- * Club domestic league appearances and goals ‡ National team caps and goals as of 13:46, 14 January 2009 (UTC)

Carmine Coppola (Italian pronunciation: [ˈkarmine ˈkɔppola]; born 10 January 1979) is an Italian former professional footballer who played as a midfielder.

== Club career ==
Coppola joined AlbinoLeffe in 2000 in co-ownership deal. In June 2001 AlbinoLeffe acquired the remain 50% registration rights from Vicenza. He then sold to Messina in 2001.

In January 2007, Coppola exchanged with Andrea Giallombardo on loan, making his Serie A debut in Livorno on 14 January against Atalanta. He then signed a new contract with the club. He was released after the bankrupt of Messina. He joined Serie B team Frosinone. He moved again in December on free transfer.

In August 2009 he terminated his contract with Salernitana, and joined Arezzo.

In January 2010 he left for Taranto. In July, he joined SPAL. In August 2011, he returned to Messina, a Serie D team.

== International career ==
Coppola also appeared for the Italy national team in two friendly matches played in 2005 against Serbia and Montenegro and Ecuador.
