= Alessio Arfè =

Italian footballer (born 1987)

Personal information
- Date of birth: 18 January 1987 (age 39)
- Place of birth: Naples, Italy
- Height: 1.87 m (6 ft 2 in)
- Position: Goalkeeper

Youth career
- Colligiana
- 2005–2007: Siena

Senior career*
Years	Team	Apps	(Gls)
2007	Val di Sangro	1	(0)
2007–2008	Sambenedettese	0	(0)
2008–2009	Viareggio	20	(0)
2009–2011	Fortis Juventus	34	(0)
2011–	Viareggio	0	(0)
- * Club domestic league appearances and goals

Alessio Arfè (born 18 January 1987) is an Italian footballer who plays as a goalkeeper. He appeared in the fourth tier of football in Italy for Val di Sangro and Viareggio.

== Biography ==
Arfè was signed by A.C. Siena in 2005. In 2006–07 season he wore no.87 shirt. On 1 February 2007 he joined Val di Sangro. In mid-2008 he joined Viareggio, replacing departed Danilo Russo. He played 20 games (2 more in play-offs) and the rest was played by Luca Babbini. After the club promoted to Lega Pro Prima Divisione, he left the club and joined Serie D side Fortis Juventus. In March 2011 he was re-signed by Viareggio in a 4-month contract to provide extra cover for Carlo Pinsoglio and Giorgio Merlano (themselves were replacing Nicola Ravaglia and Babbini).
