= Eros Bagnara =

Italian footballer (born 1985)

Personal information
- Date of birth: 27 April 1985 (age 41)
- Place of birth: Treviso, Italy
- Height: 1.80 m (5 ft 11 in)
- Position: Forward

Youth career
- –2004: Treviso
- 2004: → Internazionale (loan)

Senior career*
Years	Team	Apps	(Gls)
2004–2007	Treviso	0	(0)
2004–2005	→ ASD Santa Lucia Calcio (loan)	31	(11)
2005–2006	→ Fermana (loan)	14	(3)
2006–2007	→ Novara (loan)	28	(2)
2007–2008	Pizzighettone	24	(7)
2008–2009	Città di Jesolo	17	(6)
2009–2010	FeralpiSalò	20	(1)
2010–2011	Sant'Angelo		
2011–2012	Pro Roncade		
2012–2013	Edo Mestre RSM		
2013–2014	Mestre		
2014–2015	ASD Liapiave		
Total		134	(30)
- * Club domestic league appearances and goals

Eros Bagnara (born 27 April 1985) is a Italian former footballer who plays as a forward.

== Biography ==
=== Youth career ===
Born in Treviso, Veneto, Bagnara started his career at hometown club Treviso. He played for its under-20 team since 2002–03 season. Follow the promotion of the first team to Serie B, the U-20 team also changed to play in Campionato Nazionale Primavera. In January 2004 he was signed by Serie A club Internazionale. The team finished as the runner-up of Primavera League, losing to Lecce. He was the fourth striker of the team, behind Isah Eliakwu (18 goals in the league group stage), Riccardo Meggiorini (9 goals) and Federico Piovaccari (8 goals). Bagnara only scored 4 goals in the league group stage (ranked fifth in the team), but with only 6 league appearances, made Bagnara was one of the most effective scorer of the team along with Eliakwu. Bagnara played twice in the playoffs (round of 16 against Como) with 1 goal.

=== Between Serie C & Serie D ===
Inter did not excised the option to buy Bagnara in 2004. Bagnara was loaned to a Serie D team from Santa Lucia di Piave, a nearby town from Treviso. In mid-2005 Serie C1 club Fermana borrowed Bagnara. That season Treviso promoted to Serie A and no room for Bagnara. In his first professional season, Bagnara scored 3 goals in the first half and 1 goal for Novara in the second half.(Serie D is a top level of regional league with wage cap, made it semi-pro) That season Fermana relegated and folded, while Novara finished in the mid-table in the same group (Group A).

Bagnara remained in the city of Novara for 2006–07 Serie C1 after the loan was renewed in August. Again Bagnara only able to score once. In mid-2007 Bagnara was sold to Serie C2 club Pizzighettone in a co-ownership deal, for a peppercorn of €500. Team-mate Giovanni Martina also went to the town of Pizzighettone in the same deal. Bagnara scored 7 goals in Italian fourth tier, ahead team-mate Michele Piccolo but behind Marcello Campolonghi. However, the team relegated and Treviso gave up the remain 50% registration rights to Pizzighettone. Bagnara also left the club in order returned to Veneto for dilettanti (the Italian word for amateur and the "D" in Serie D state for) club Città di Jesolo for 2008–09 season, despite Pizzighettone later was re-admitted due to number of teams were expelled from the professional league.

Bagnara returned to professional league again in 2009–10 Lega Pro Seconda Divisione for FeralpiSalò on a free transfer.

=== Amateur ===
In October 2010 Bagnara joined Sant'Angelo Lodigiano, an Eccellenza Lombardy team. (Italian sixth highest level at that time) He was released again in summer 2011. In 2011–12 season Bagnara played for Pro Roncade, a Prima Categoria team (Italian eighth highest level at that time) located in Roncade, Veneto.
