= Andrea Giallombardo =

Italian footballer (born 1980)

Personal information
- Date of birth: 19 August 1980 (age 46)
- Place of birth: Rome, Italy
- Height: 1.75 m (5 ft 9 in)
- Position: Left back

Youth career
- 1998–1999: Roma

Senior career*
Years	Team	Apps	(Gls)
1999–2000	Roma	0	(0)
1999–2000	→ Foggia (loan)	12	(0)
2000–2002	Viareggio	46	(1)
2002–2004	Grosseto	30	(0)
2003–2004	→ Catania (loan)	41	(0)
2004–2007	Livorno	21	(0)
2005–2006	→ Lazio (loan)	6	(0)
2007	→ Messina (loan)	16	(0)
2007–2013	Ascoli	107	(0)
2011–2012	→ Grosseto (loan)	38	(0)
2013	→ Latina (loan)	7	(0)
2013–2015	Parma	0	(0)
2013–2014	→ Gubbio (loan)	23	(1)
- * Club domestic league appearances and goals

Andrea Giallombardo (born 19 August 1980) is an Italian former footballer who played as a defender.

== Career ==
Born in Rome, Giallombardo started his career at A.S. Roma, which he left for Viareggio in co-ownership deal in 2000, along with Marco Sansovini for a peppercorn fee. In June 2001 Viareggio signed Giallombardo outright. After 3 seasons at Serie C2 from 1999 to 2002, he was signed by another Serie C2 club Grosseto. In summer 2003 he was signed by Perugia in co-ownership deal, however on 30 August 2003 he was signed by Serie B club Calcio Catania in temporary deal. In June 2004 Grosseto bought back Giallombardo.

=== Livorno ===
In August 2004 he was signed by Livorno. In January 2007, Carmine Coppola changed club with Giallombardo. Giallombardo played his first Messina Serie A match on 14 January 2007 against former club Roma

=== Ascoli ===
In July 2007, Giallombardo was sold to Ascoli in another co-ownership deal. In June 2008 Ascoli acquired him outright.

In January 2011 he was signed by Grosseto in temporary deal. On 23 August 2011 the loan was extended, with Andrea Soncin moved to Ascoli.

In 2012, he returned to Ascoli but in January 2013 left for Lega Pro Prima Divisione club Latina. In 2013 Giallombardo returned to Ascoli again for his last year of the contract, which Ascoli had relegated in June 2013.

=== Parma ===
on 30 July 2013 Giallombardo was transferred to Serie A club Parma F.C. along with Mirko Ronchi. Ronchi immediately returned to Ascoli and Giallombardo was farmed to Gubbio. In 2014, he failed to find a club to borrow him from Parma, thus he was allowed to stay at home despite under contract with Parma.
