= Luigi Anaclerio =

Italian footballer

Personal information
- Date of birth: 25 March 1981 (age 45)
- Place of birth: Bari, Italy
- Height: 1.84 m (6 ft 0 in)
- Position: Forward

Youth career
- Bari

Senior career*
Years	Team	Apps	(Gls)
2000–2006	Bari	95	(14)
2003	→ Como (loan)	5	(0)
2003–2004	→ Treviso (loan)	39	(4)
2006–2009	Hellas Verona	13	(0)
2007–2008	→ Perugia (loan)	26	(2)
2009–2011	Andria BAT	40	(2)
2011–2012	Bisceglie		
2012–2013	Martina Franca		

International career
2002	Italy U21	1	(0)
- * Club domestic league appearances and goals

Luigi Anaclerio (born 25 March 1981) is a former Italian footballer who played as a forward.

He is the elder brother of Michele Anaclerio.

== Career ==
=== Bari ===
Anaclerio started his career at Bari at Serie A. He made his debut on 19 November 2000, against Lecce. After the relegation in 2001, Anaclerio played more regular with first team at 2001–02 Serie B season. In the 2nd half of 2002–03 season, he left on loan to Como, also at Serie B. In the next season he left for Treviso on loan.

He then returned to Bari in 2004, mainly as substitute player.

=== Verona ===
In July 2006, he joined Hellas Verona F.C. in co-ownership deal. One the same day Carlo Gervasoni moved to Bari also in co-ownership deal. After just played twice, he left for Perugia of Serie C1 on loan. He remained at Perugia in 2007–08 season.

In 2008–09 season, Anaclerio returned to Verona, now at Lega Pro Prima Divisione, played 11 times.

=== Andria BAT ===
In August 2009, he left for Andria BAT.
