= Salvatore Bruno =

Italian footballer

Personal information
- Date of birth: 9 November 1979 (age 46)
- Place of birth: Naples, Italy
- Height: 1.83 m (6 ft 0 in)
- Position: Striker

Team information
- Current team: Rezzato
- Number: 9

Youth career
- –1997: Napoli

Senior career*
Years	Team	Apps	(Gls)
1997–1999	Napoli	3	(0)
1998–1999	→ Fermana (loan)	29	(5)
1999–2001	Chievo	2	(0)
1999–2000	→ Cremonese (loan)	26	(3)
2000	→ SPAL (loan)	13	(2)
2001	→ Alzano (loan)	13	(2)
2001–2003	Ascoli	65	(25)
2003–2006	Chievo	4	(0)
2003–2004	→ Ancona (loan)	8	(0)
2004	→ Bari (loan)	19	(5)
2004–2005	→ Catania (loan)	16	(2)
2005	→ Torino (loan)	16	(3)
2005–2006	→ Brescia (loan)	37	(13)
2007–2010	Modena	105	(47)
2010–2012	Sassuolo	34	(8)
2012–2013	Juve Stabia	26	(7)
2013–2014	Modena	7	(0)
2014–2015	Real Vicenza	36	(16)
2015–2018	Giana Erminio	96	(42)
2018–	Rezzato		

International career
1995–1996	Italy U-16	2	(0)
- * Club domestic league appearances and goals as of 5 August 2018

Salvatore Bruno (born 9 November 1979) is a former Italian footballer who last played as a striker for Italian Serie D club Rezzato .

== Club career ==
Bruno started his career at Serie A team Napoli, but most of his career has been spent in the lower division.

=== Chievo ===
Bruno was signed by Chievo in co-ownership deal in 1999. In January 2001, Bruno was signed by Alzano in a temporary deal, after making a handful of appearances with SPAL. In June 2001, Chievo bought Bruno outright. However, he was loaned to Ascoli with an option to co-own the player. In June 2003, Chievo bought Bruno back again, but Bruno left for Ancona in another temporary deal. Bruno switched clubs every 6 months, which he left for Bari, Torino, Catania and finally played a whole season for Brescia. Bruno made 4 appearances for Chievo in 2006–07 Serie A.

=== Modena ===
In January 2007, after a few appearances, he left Serie A team Chievo and moved to Modena, exchanged with Michele Troiano in co-ownership deal.

In June 2008, Modena bought him outright and bought back Troiano, in exchange, Angelo Antonazzo and Nicholas Frey went to Chievo.

=== Sassuolo ===
In August 2010 Bruno was signed by Sassuolo on reported free transfer. The club also signed Troiano from Modena, the seat of the province that Sassuolo is located. Bruno took Riccardo Zampagna's no.9 shirt. However, he was the backup striker.

=== Juve Stabia ===
In summer 2012, he moved to Juve Stabia. At the end of the season, he had played 26 games with 7 goals.

=== Back in Modena ===
In the summer of 2013, he returned to play in the files of Modena in Serie B.

=== Lega Pro ===
The following year falls in the Lega Pro by signing a contract with Real Vicenza; the following year, he began to play in the Giana Erminio.

== International career ==
Bruno was a member of Italy U16 team in 1996 UEFA European Under-16 Football Championship qualification.
