= Michele Troiano =

Italian footballer (born 1985)

Personal information
- Date of birth: 7 January 1985 (age 41)
- Place of birth: Desio, Italy
- Height: 1.88 m (6 ft 2 in)
- Position: Midfielder

Senior career*
| Years | Team | Apps | (Gls) |
| 2003–2004 | Monza | 6 | (0) |
| 2004–2007 | Modena | 38 | (4) |
| 2007–2008 | Chievo | 16 | (0) |
| 2008–2010 | Modena | 62 | (8) |
| 2010–2013 | Sassuolo | 56 | (5) |
| 2013–2018 | Virtus Entella | 151 | (15) |
| 2018–2020 | Ascoli | 46 | (1) |
| 2020–2021 | Juventus U23 | 19 | (1) |

International career
| 2004–2005 | Italy U20 | 9 | (0) |
- * Club domestic league appearances and goals as of 31 May 2021

Michele Troiano (born 7 January 1985) is an Italian former professional footballer who played as a midfielder.

== Club career ==
Troiano started his career at native club Monza. He then joined Modena F.C. in Serie B. In January 2007, then Serie A team Chievo signed Troiano in a co-ownership deal, exchanged with Salvatore Bruno.

On 3 March 2007 Troiano played his first Serie A match for Chievo against A.C. Milan.

In June 2008, Modena bought him back and bought Bruno outright, in exchange, Angelo Antonazzo and Nicholas Frey went to Chievo.

On 28 October 2020, Troiano played his first match for Juventus U23 in a 2–1 defeat against Como. On 2 May 2021, he scored his first goal for Juventus U23 in a 3–2 defeat against Piacenza. On 13 August, Troiano announced his retirement from football.

== International career ==
Troiano was capped for the Italy under-20 side in the 2005 FIFA World Youth Championship.
