= Filippo Fedeli =

Italian professional footballer

Personal information
- Date of birth: 27 January 1983 (age 43)
- Place of birth: Arezzo, Italy
- Height: 1.77 m (5 ft 10 in)
- Position: Defender

Youth career
- Fiorentina

Senior career*
Years	Team	Apps	(Gls)
2001–2002	Fiorentina	2	(0)
2002–2003	Gualdo	29	(0)
2003–2005	SPAL	50	(0)
2005–2006	Pisa	27	(0)
2007	Empoli	0	(0)
2007	→ Olbia (loan)	12	(0)
2007–2009	Ternana	33	(0)
2009–2010	Olbia	38	(0)
2010–2011	Selargius	11	(0)
2011–2012	Monterotondo	30	(0)
2012–2013	Deruta	26	(0)

International career
1999	Italy U-15	1	(0)
- * Club domestic league appearances and goals

Filippo Fedeli (born 27 January 1983) is an Italian professional footballer.

He played two games in the Serie A in the 2001–02 season for ACF Fiorentina. He also played for Fiorentina in the 2001–02 UEFA Cup.

In January 2007, Fedeli joined Empoli. He immediately left for Olbia. On 31 August 2007 he joined Ternana. On 8 January 2009, Fedeli returned to Olbia.
