= Domenico Falco =

Italian footballer (born 1985)

Personal information
- Date of birth: 3 May 1985 (age 41)
- Place of birth: Caserta, Italy
- Height: 1.81 m (5 ft 11 1/2 in)
- Position: Forward

Youth career
- 2002–2004: Cittadella

Senior career*
Years	Team	Apps	(Gls)
2004–2005	Rosetana	28	(3)
2005–2007	Foligno	31	(3)
2007–2008	Massese	17	(3)
2008–2009	Ascoli	2	(0)
2009	Vigor Lamezia	10	(0)
2009	Casertana	12	(1)
2009	Olympia Agnonese	2	(0)
2010	Montebelluna	21	(6)
2010–2011	Union Quinto	19	(1)

International career
2005	Italy U-20 Serie C		
2005	Italy U-21 Serie C	1	(0)
- * Club domestic league appearances and goals

Domenico Falco (born 3 May 1985) is an Italian former professional footballer who played in Serie B for Ascoli.

== Biography ==
Born in Caserta, Campania, Falco started his career at northern Italy side Cittadella Padova. In mid-2004 he was transferred to Rosetana.

In mid-2005 he joined another Serie C2 team Foligno but from Ascoli in co-ownership deal. In January 2007 he returned to Ascoli Piceno but left for Massese in another co-ownership deal.

In June 2008 Ascoli bought back Falco. He only played twice in 2008–09 Serie B. In January 2009, he left for Vigor Lamezia on free transfer.

In July 2009 he left for Serie D team Casertana. In December, he left for Olympia Agnonese and in January 2010 left for Montebelluna.

=== International career ===
Falco was a member of Italy U-20 Serie C team in 2004–05 Mirop Cup. He also played in European Challenge Trophy on 30 November 2005.
