= Leandro Vitiello =

Italian footballer

Personal information
- Date of birth: 16 October 1985 (age 41)
- Place of birth: Scafati, Italy
- Height: 1.77 m (5 ft 10 in)
- Position: Attacking midfielder

Youth career
- Napoli

Senior career*
Years	Team	Apps	(Gls)
2003–2004	Melfi	11	(0)
2004–2005	Ostia Mare	25	(3)
2005–2006	Acireale	22	(3)
2006	Vicenza	3	(0)
2007	→ Cremonese (loan)	13	(3)
2007	Ascoli	0	(0)
2008	→ Sambenedettese (loan)	8	(0)
2008–2011	Grosseto	95	(8)
2011–2012	Ascoli	13	(1)
2012–2013	Bellinzona	6	(0)
2013–2014	Catanzaro	27	(0)
2014–2016	Benevento	33	(1)
2017	Ancona	9	(0)
2017–2018	Gavorrano	28	(3)
2018–2020	Pistoiese	49	(1)
2020–2021	Vibonese	15	(0)
2021–2022	Paganese	14	(0)

International career
2001	Italy U17	1	(0)
- * Club domestic league appearances and goals as of 22 December 2021

Leandro Vitiello (born 16 October 1985) is an Italian footballer. Vitiello was born in the Italian neighbourhood of Scafati and started his professional career with Melfi.

== Club career ==
On 18 September 2020 he signed with Vibonese.

On 3 August 2021, he signed with Paganese. His contract with Paganese was terminated by mutual consent on 21 January 2022.

=== Club statistics ===
Club performance			League		Cup		Continental		Total	
Season	Club	League	Apps	Goals	Apps	Goals	Apps	Goals	Apps	Goals
Italy			League		Coppa Italia		Europe		Total	
2008–09	Grosseto	Serie B	30	2	0	0	0	0	30	2
2009–10	Grosseto	Serie B	31	4	0	0	0	0	31	4
2010–11	Grosseto	Serie B	32	2	1	1	0	0	33	3
Total	Italy		93	8	1	1	0	0	94	9
Career total			93	8	1	1	0	0	94	9
