= Michele Anaclerio =

Italian footballer

Personal information
- Date of birth: 15 May 1982 (age 44)
- Place of birth: Bari, Italy
- Height: 1.78 m (5 ft 10 in)
- Position: Centre-back

Senior career*
Years	Team	Apps	(Gls)
2000–2006	Bari	71	(1)
2001–2003	→ Lanciano (loan)	52	(2)
2006–2011	Piacenza	88	(8)
2011–2014	Benevento	39	(1)
2014	Vicenza	2	(0)
2014–2015	Bisceglie	35	(2)
2015–2017	Gravina		
2017–2018	Omnia Bitonto		
2018	Corato		
2018–2019	Bitonto	19	(1)
2019–2020	Molfetta		

International career
2004	Italy U21 Serie B	1	(1)
- * Club domestic league appearances and goals

Michele Anaclerio (born 15 May 1982) is an Italian former professional footballer who played as a centre-back.

== Career ==
A youth product of A.S. Bari, Anaclerio made his Serie A debut on 27 May 2001 for Bari against Reggina Calcio, in Bari's third-last Serie A match of the season, since the club were in last place and had already mathematically been relegated.

On 30 March 2004, he played for the Serie B U21 Italian selection against Belgium U21.

In December 2017, Anaclerio joined Omnia Bitonto. After spells with Corato Calcio and U.S. Bitonto in Serie D, Anaclerio joined Molfetta Calcio at the end of August 2019.
