= AC Sansovino =

Italian football club

Sansovino
- Full name: Associazione Calcio Sansovino Srl
- Founded: 1929
- Ground: Stadio Le Fonti, Monte San Savino, Italy
- Capacity: 2,500
- Chairman: Valentina Veltroni
- Manager: Roberto Fani
- League: Eccellenza Tuscany
- 2011–12: Serie D/E, 18th
Home colours	Away colours

Associazione Calcio Sansovino is an Italian association football club, based in Monte San Savino, Tuscany. Sansovino currently plays in Eccellenza.

== History ==
=== Foundation ===
The club was founded in 1929.

=== From Serie C2 to Serie D ===
From the 2003–04 to the 2007–08 season, the club has played five seasons in Serie C2.

Sansovino, in the 2010–11 Eccellenza season was promoted in Serie D from Eccellenza Tuscany group B, after winning the play-off; but in the next season it was immediately relegated again to Eccellenza.

== Colors and badge ==
The team's colors are orange and blue.

== Honours ==
- Coppa Italia Serie D
  - Winners: 2002–03
